= List of San Diego Trolley stations =

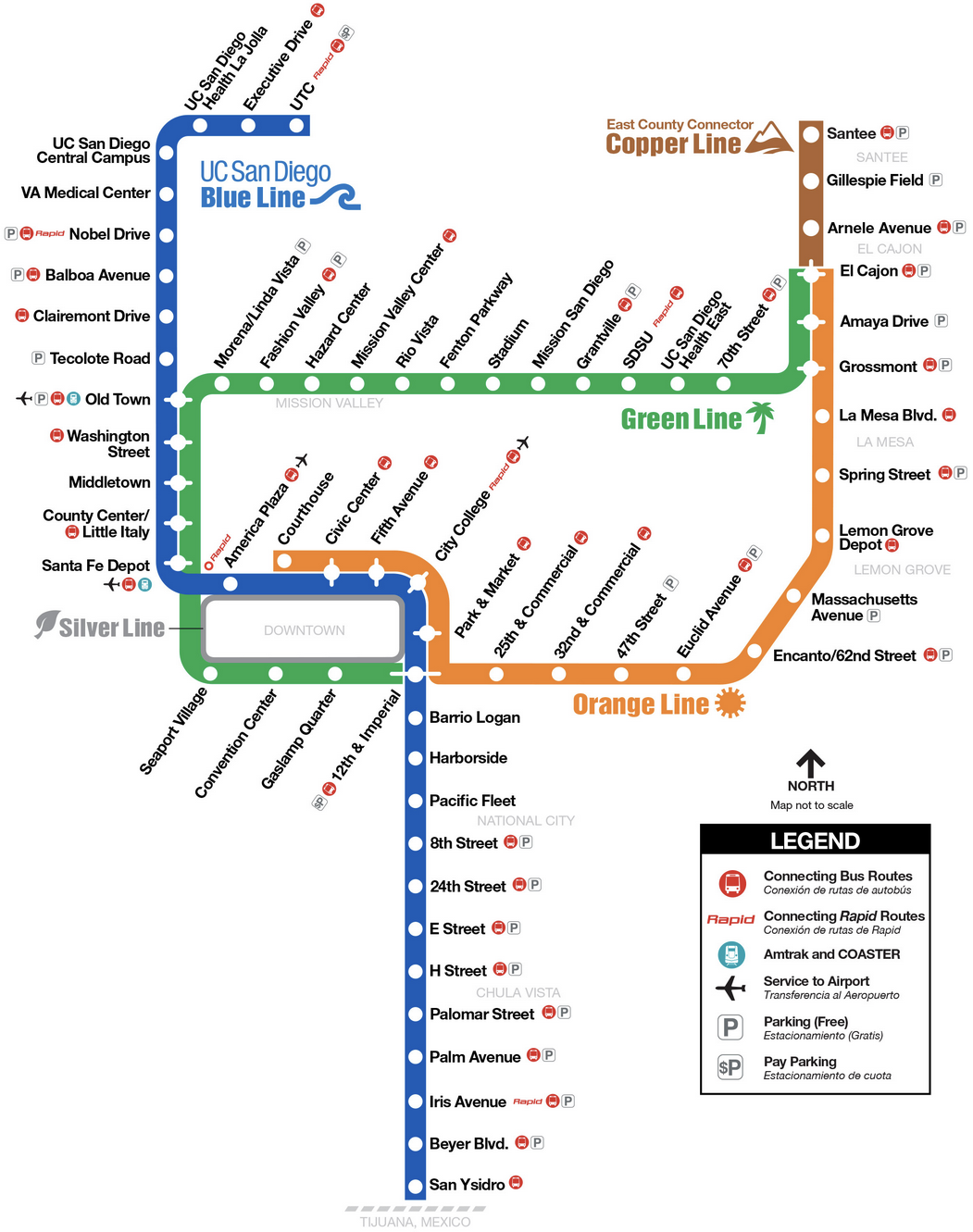
The San Diego Trolley system as of September 2024

The San Diego Trolley is a light rail system operating in San Diego County, California. The trolley's operator, San Diego Trolley, Inc. (reporting mark SDTI), is a subsidiary of the San Diego Metropolitan Transit System (MTS). The San Diego Trolley opened for service on July 26, 1981. It operates four primary lines (Blue, Orange, Green, and Copper) as well as a supplementary heritage streetcar downtown loop known as the Silver Line that operates on holidays.

== History ==
The current operating company of the San Diego Trolley system, San Diego Trolley Incorporated (SDTI), was not founded until 1980 when the Metropolitan Transit Development Board (now operating as San Diego's MTS) began to plan a light-rail service along the Main Line of the former San Diego and Arizona Eastern Railway (SD&AE Railway), which the MTDB purchased from the Southern Pacific Railroad in 1979. The Trolley began operations on July 19, 1981, with revenue service beginning on July 26, 1981. Trains at that time operated on a single line between Centre City or downtown San Diego and San Ysidro, with stops in some San Diego neighborhoods, and in the cities of National City and Chula Vista.

In March 1986, SDTI opened an extension east from Centre City San Diego to Euclid Avenue, along the La Mesa Branch of the former SD&AE Railway – this new second line of the Trolley was then called the East Line, while the original line opened in 1981 became the South Line. Service was extended along the East Line to Spring Street on May 12, 1989 serving Lemon Grove, and then to La Mesa and El Cajon on June 23, 1989. Service between El Cajon and Santee, which is not along the old SD&AE right-of-way, began on August 26, 1995.

The "Bayside" extension of the Trolley in San Diego, which operates near the waterfront, opened on June 30, 1990. The first phase of the extension to Old Town, from C Street to Little Italy in downtown San Diego, opened on July 2, 1992. The second phase of the Old Town extension, running from Little Italy to Old Town, opened on June 16, 1996.

The "Mission Valley West" SDTI extension, which opened a new Trolley route between Old Town and Mission San Diego (which included the Qualcomm Stadium stop) commenced service on November 23, 1997, just before San Diego's hosting of Super Bowl XXXII in early 1998. It was at this time that the former South and East Trolley Lines were renamed the Blue Line and Orange Line, respectively. The "Mission Valley East" extension between Mission San Diego and La Mesa opened for service on July 10, 2005, coinciding with the inauguration of the Green Line.

Stations along the Blue and Orange lines were renovated during 2010–15 as part of the Trolley Renewal Project.

== Current system ==
The routes are arranged approximately geographically true; the Blue Line runs from the upper left corner (La Jolla) to the lower right corner (San Ysidro): the Orange Line runs from the left middle (downtown San Diego) to the upper right (El Cajon), and the Green Line also runs from the left middle (downtown San Diego) to the upper right (El Cajon), taking a route that lies largely along Mission Valley / Interstate 8. The Copper Line runs from El Cajon to Santee.

The San Diego Trolley system has 62 operational stations serving its six Trolley lines, four of which operate daily (the Silver Line only operates during select holidays, and the Special Event Line is only active during Comic-Con).

Fourteen of the Trolley system's stations operate as transfer stations, which allow passengers to transfer between lines. There is one universal transfer point (i.e. allowing for transfers among all three major lines – Blue, Green, and Orange) in the system in downtown San Diego: the 12th & Imperial Transit Center station. The adjacent Santa Fe Depot/America Plaza/Courthouse stations, which are within walking distance of each other, also allow for transfer among the four lines. Six Trolley stations are end-of-line stations. Of the 63 stations, 47 of them are within the city limits of San Diego, serving various neighborhoods in San Diego; the other 16 stations are located in surrounding communities, such as El Cajon and National City.

Most stations in the San Diego Trolley system are 'at-grade' stations. There are ten elevated stations in the system and a single underground station (SDSU Transit Center).

About half of San Diego Trolley stations offer free park and ride lots. Most Trolley stations offer connections to MTS bus lines.

=== Renamed stations ===
In June 1990, the station on C Street, between Fifth and Sixth Avenues, originally named Gaslamp station, was renamed Fifth Avenue station following a service expansion of the East Line (now the Orange Line) around the new downtown loop, which included a new Gaslamp Quarter station much closer to Gaslamp Quarter. Both Main & Marshall station was renamed to El Cajon Transit Center and Broadway Lemon Grove station was renamed to Lemon Grove Depot at the same time.

In March 2004, 12th & Market station was renamed Park & Market station following a reconstruction.

In July 2005, with the launch of the Green Line, Weld Boulevard station was renamed Gillespie Field station.

In September 2012, following a system-wide service reconfiguration, Bayfront/E Street station was renamed E Street station.

In June 2017, following Qualcomm’s expiration of naming rights to San Diego Stadium, Qualcomm Stadium station was renamed Stadium station. Following the demolition of San Diego Stadium throughout 2020 and 2021, the location is now the site of San Diego State University’s Snapdragon Stadium and Mission Valley campus.

In October 2017, following the sale of the Green Line’s naming rights to Sycuan Casino, El Cajon Transit Center was for a period of time named El Cajon–Sycuan.

In December 2023, following the adjacent Alvarado Hospital being sold by Prime Healthcare Services to UC San Diego Health and renamed, Alvarado Medical Center station was renamed Alvarado station.

In September 2024, in part due to the signage on Trolleys and signage on the Green Line being updated to reflect the recently opened Copper Line, Alvarado station was renamed again to UC San Diego Health East.

=== Closed stations ===
==== San Diego Square station ====
San Diego Square station, opened in July 1981 on C Street between Seventh & Eighth Avenues downtown, was closed on March 23, 1986, due to low ridership, its close proximity to the (then renamed, see above) Fifth Avenue station, and the desire to eliminate a station in order to accommodate the soon-to-open infill station at E Street (which opened in October 1986) without adding to travel times along the line.

Remnants of this old station still remain on C Street between Seventh & Eighth Avenues.

==== Columbia Street station ====
Columbia Street station, opened in July 1981 on C and Columbia Streets as Santa Fe Depot and renamed in June 1990, was closed in November 1991, with the track in the vicinity being reconfigured. It was replaced by America Plaza station one block to the west.

=== Lines ===
As of 2021, trolley service operates on three main lines offering daily service: the Blue, Green, and Orange Lines, and travels through the 62 stations and 65 total miles of mostly double-track rail. A fourth line, the heritage streetcar Silver Line, operates more limited weekday and weekend service, in a clockwise 'circle-loop' around downtown San Diego only. In September 2024, the Copper Line was created between El Cajon and Santee.

Line	Opened	Length	Number of stations	Termini	Operation
Blue Line	1981	26.3 mi (42.3 km)	32	UTC Transit Center; San Ysidro Transit Center	Daily
Green Line	2005	19.8 mi (31.9 km)	24	12th & Imperial Transit Center; El Cajon Transit Center	Daily
Orange Line	1986	17.1 mi (27.5 km)	18	Courthouse station El Cajon Transit Center	Daily
Silver Line	2011	2.7 mi (4.3 km)	9	12th & Imperial Transit Center	On Select Holidays
Copper Line	2024	3.8 mi (6.1 km)	4	Santee station El Cajon Transit Center	Daily

=== Stations ===
The following table lists all stations currently served by the San Diego Trolley.

Table key
†	Terminal station

Station	Image	Line(s)	Location	Comments
8th Street	The platforms at 8th Street station, 2019	Blue Line	National City	
12th & Imperial†	A view of 12th & Imperial Transit Center, 2016	Blue Line; Green Line; Orange Line; Silver Line	San Diego, East Village	Universal transfer station for all lines: transfer for Blue, Green, Orange, and Silver lines. Serves Petco Park. Terminus for Green and Silver lines.
24th Street	The platforms at 24th Street station, 2016	Blue Line	National City	
25th & Commercial	The outbound track at 25th & Commercial station	Orange Line	San Diego, Grant Hill	
32nd & Commercial	32nd & Commercial station, 2008	Orange Line	San Diego, Stockton	
47th Street	The platform at 47th Street station	Orange Line	San Diego, Chollas View	
70th Street	The platform at 70th Street station	Green Line	La Mesa	
Amaya Drive	A view of Amaya Drive station	Green Line; Orange Line	La Mesa	Transfer station for Green and Orange lines.
America Plaza†	America Plaza station at night, 2019	Blue Line; Silver Line	San Diego, Downtown Core	Transfer station for Blue and Silver lines. Directly adjacent to Santa Fe Depot (i.e. short walking distance) – so is also an "indirect" transfer point for the Green Line. This was an infill station – added upon competition of the One America Plaza building in 1991. Terminus for some Blue Line trains.
Arnele Avenue†		Copper Line	El Cajon	Serves Parkway Plaza.
Balboa Avenue	The platforms at Balboa Avenue station	Blue Line	Clairemont, San Diego	
Barrio Logan	Barrio Logan station with part of the San Diego–Coronado Bridge in the background, 2018	Blue Line	San Diego, Logan Heights	Serves Chicano Park.
Beyer Boulevard	A trolley at Beyer Boulevard station	Blue Line	San Diego, San Ysidro	
City College	City College station, 2019	Blue Line; Orange Line; Silver Line	San Diego, East Village	Serves San Diego City College, San Diego High School.
Civic Center	Civic Center Station 02-25-2024	Blue Line; Orange Line; Silver Line	San Diego, Downtown Core	Serves City Hall and Courthouse.
Clairemont Drive	The platforms at Clairemont Drive station in August 2021 about three months before its official opening	Blue Line	San Diego, Clairemont	Serves Mission Bay.
Convention Center	The platforms at Convention Center station, 2011	Green Line; Silver Line	San Diego, Marina	Serves San Diego Convention Center.
County Center/Little Italy	A trolley at County Center/Little Italy station	Green Line; Blue Line	San Diego, Middletown	Serves San Diego County Administration Center.
Courthouse†	Courthouse station, 2024	Orange Line	San Diego, Downtown Core	Serves the San Diego County Courthouse complex. Terminus for Orange Line.
E Street	The platforms at Bayfront/E Street station	Blue Line	Chula Vista	This was an infill station (it was added 5 years after the line's opening) – the first infill station on the current Blue Line.
El Cajon	A view of El Cajon station, 2017	Green Line; Orange Line; Copper Line	El Cajon	Terminus for Orange Line, Green Line, and Copper Line
Encanto/62nd Street	The platform at Encanto/62nd Street station, 2008	Orange Line	San Diego, Encanto	
Euclid Avenue	The platforms at Euclid Avenue station	Orange Line	San Diego, Emerald Hills	
Executive Drive	The platforms at Executive Drive station	Blue Line	University City, San Diego	
Fashion Valley	The platforms at Fashion Valley station, 2019	Green Line	San Diego, Mission Valley	Serves Fashion Valley Mall.
Fenton Parkway	The platforms at Fenton Parkway station	Green Line	San Diego, Mission Valley	This was an infill station (it was added almost 3 years after the line's opening) – the only infill station on the current Green Line.
Fifth Avenue	A trolley at Fifth Avenue station	Blue Line; Orange Line; Silver Line	San Diego, Downtown Core	Serves downtown San Diego.
Gaslamp Quarter	A view of Gaslamp Quarter station from the San Diego Convention Center side of the freight track	Green Line; Silver Line	San Diego, Gaslamp Quarter	Serves Gaslamp Quarter; also Convention Center & Petco Park.
Gillespie Field	The platforms at Gillespie Field station	Copper Line	El Cajon	Serves Gillespie Field (airport).
Grantville	An eastbound trolley at Grantville station	Green Line	San Diego, Grantville	
Grossmont	The platforms at Grossmont Transit Center	Green Line; Orange Line	La Mesa	Serves Grossmont Center.
H Street	H Street station, 2019	Blue Line	Chula Vista	
Harborside	The platforms at Harborside station, 2019	Blue Line	San Diego, Logan Heights	
Hazard Center	The platforms at Hazard Center station, 2019	Green Line	San Diego, Mission Valley	Serves the Hazard Center Shopping Center.
Iris Avenue	The platforms at Iris Avenue station, 2019	Blue Line	San Diego, Otay Mesa West	
La Mesa Blvd.	A view of La Mesa Boulevard station from Spring Street, 2024	Orange Line	La Mesa	
Lemon Grove Depot	The station building at Lemon Grove Depot in 2008, before the 2012 renovations	Orange Line	Lemon Grove	
Massachusetts Avenue		Orange Line	Lemon Grove	
Middletown	The platforms at Middletown station, 2019	Green Line; Blue Line	San Diego, Mission Hills	
Mission San Diego	The platforms at Mission San Diego station, 2019	Green Line	San Diego, Mission Valley	Serves Mission San Diego de Alcalá.
Mission Valley Center	The platforms at Mission Valley Center station, 2019	Green Line	San Diego, Mission Valley	Serves Mission Valley mall.
Morena/Linda Vista	The platforms at Morena/Linda Vista station, 2019	Green Line	San Diego, Morena	Serves University of San Diego.
Nobel Drive	The platforms at Nobel Drive station	Blue Line	La Jolla Village, San Diego	Serves La Jolla Village Square and The Shops at La Jolla.
Old Town	A trolley approaching Old Town Transit Center	Green Line; Blue Line	San Diego, Old Town	Serves Old Town Historic Park.
Pacific Fleet	The platforms at Pacific Fleet station, 2019	Blue Line	San Diego, Logan Heights	Serves Naval Base San Diego.
Palm Avenue	The platforms at Palm Avenue station, 2019	Blue Line	San Diego, Palm City	
Palomar Street	Palomar Street station before renovations in 2010	Blue Line	Chula Vista	
Park & Market	Park & Market station, 2019	Blue Line; Orange Line; Silver Line	San Diego, East Village	
Rio Vista	The platforms at Rio Vista station	Green Line	San Diego, Mission Valley	
SDSU	The platforms at SDSU Transit Center	Green Line	San Diego, College Area	Serves San Diego State University. Only underground station in the San Diego Trolley system.
San Ysidro†	A trolley at San Ysidro Transit Center	Blue Line	San Diego, San Ysidro	Serves Mexico–United States border. Terminus for Blue Line. This was the original terminus for the original Trolley line.
Santa Fe Depot	A trolley at Santa Fe Depot	Green Line; Blue Line	San Diego, East Village	Directly adjacent to America Plaza (i.e. short walking distance) – so is also an "indirect" transfer point for Blue and Silver lines. This was the original terminus for the original Trolley line.
Santee†	A trolley at Santee station	Copper Line	Santee	Terminus for Copper Line.
Seaport Village	The platforms at Seaport Village station in April 2010 when it was served by the Orange Line	Green Line; Silver Line	San Diego, Marina	Serves Seaport Village.
Spring Street	The platforms at Spring Street station in 2008, before renovations	Orange Line	La Mesa	
Stadium	The platforms at Stadium station, 2019	Green Line	San Diego, Mission Valley	Serves Snapdragon Stadium.
Tecolote Road	The platforms at Tecolote Road station	Blue Line	San Diego, Morena	Serves SeaWorld.
UC San Diego Central Campus	The entrance to UC San Diego Central Campus station	Blue Line	La Jolla	Serves the University of California, San Diego.
UC San Diego Health East	The platforms at UC San Diego Health East station	Green Line	San Diego, College Area	Serves East Campus Medical Center at UC San Diego Health
UC San Diego Health La Jolla	The platforms at UC San Diego Health La Jolla station	Blue Line	La Jolla	Serves Jacobs Medical Center and Scripps Memorial Hospital La Jolla.
UTC†	A trolley waiting at UTC station platform, 2021	Blue Line	University City, San Diego	Serves Westfield UTC and Costa Verde Shopping Center. Terminus for Blue Line.
VA Medical Center	The platforms at VA Medical Center station	Blue Line	La Jolla	Serves VA Medical Center (VAMC) of San Diego.
Washington Street	A trolley at Washington Street station	Green Line; Blue Line	San Diego, Mission Hills	
