= 32nd & Commercial station =

San Diego Trolley station

32nd & Commercial
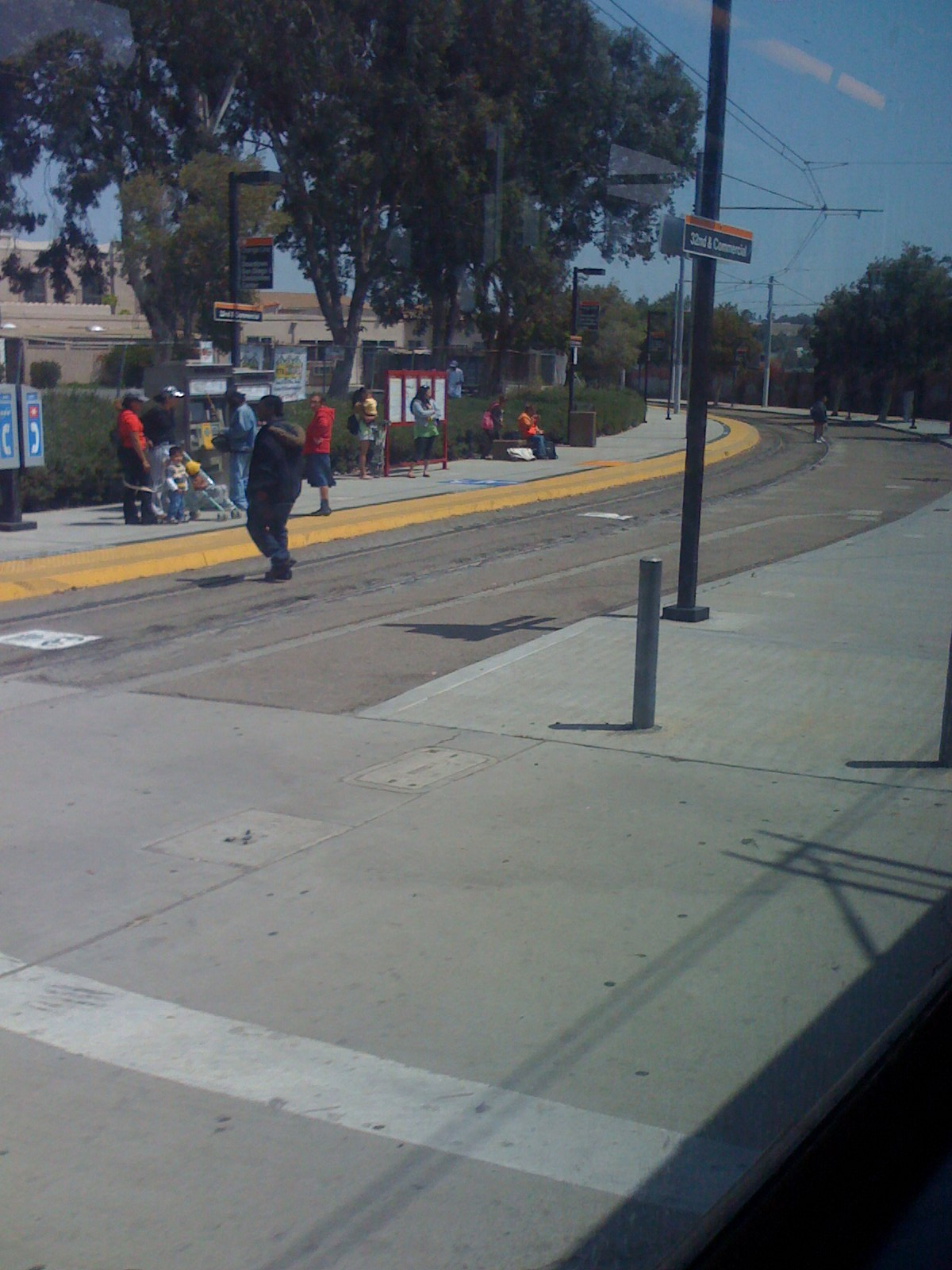
- The pre-renovated station in 2008

General information
- Location: 3200 Commercial Street; San Diego, California; United States
- Coordinates: 32°42′19″N 117°07′30″W
- Owner: San Diego Metropolitan Transit System
- Operator: San Diego Trolley
- Line: SD&AE La Mesa Branch
- Platforms: 2 side platforms
- Tracks: 2

Construction
- Structure type: At-grade
- Accessible: Disabled access

Other information
- Station code: 75072, 75073

History
- Opened: March 23, 1986
- Rebuilt: 2012

Services
Preceding station	San Diego Trolley	Following station
25th & Commercial toward Courthouse	Orange Line	47th Street toward El Cajon
Location

32nd & Commercial station is a station on the Orange Line of the San Diego Trolley located at the intersection of 32nd Street and Commercial Street in the Stockton neighborhood of San Diego, California. The stop is located in an area where the light rail temporarily breaks from its street-level tracks and runs on a separate right-of-way around the Mt. Hope and Greenwood Cemeteries.

== History ==
32nd & Commercial opened as part of the Euclid Line, the second original line of the San Diego Trolley system, on March 23, 1986. Also later known as the East Line, it operated from 12th & Imperial to Euclid Avenue before being extended in May 1989.

This station was renovated from late July until December 2012 as part of the Trolley Renewal Project, although the station remained open during construction.

== Station layout ==
There are two tracks, each served by a side platform to the north of the track.

== See also ==
- List of San Diego Trolley stations
