= Massachusetts Avenue station (San Diego Trolley) =

San Diego Trolley station

Massachusetts Avenue
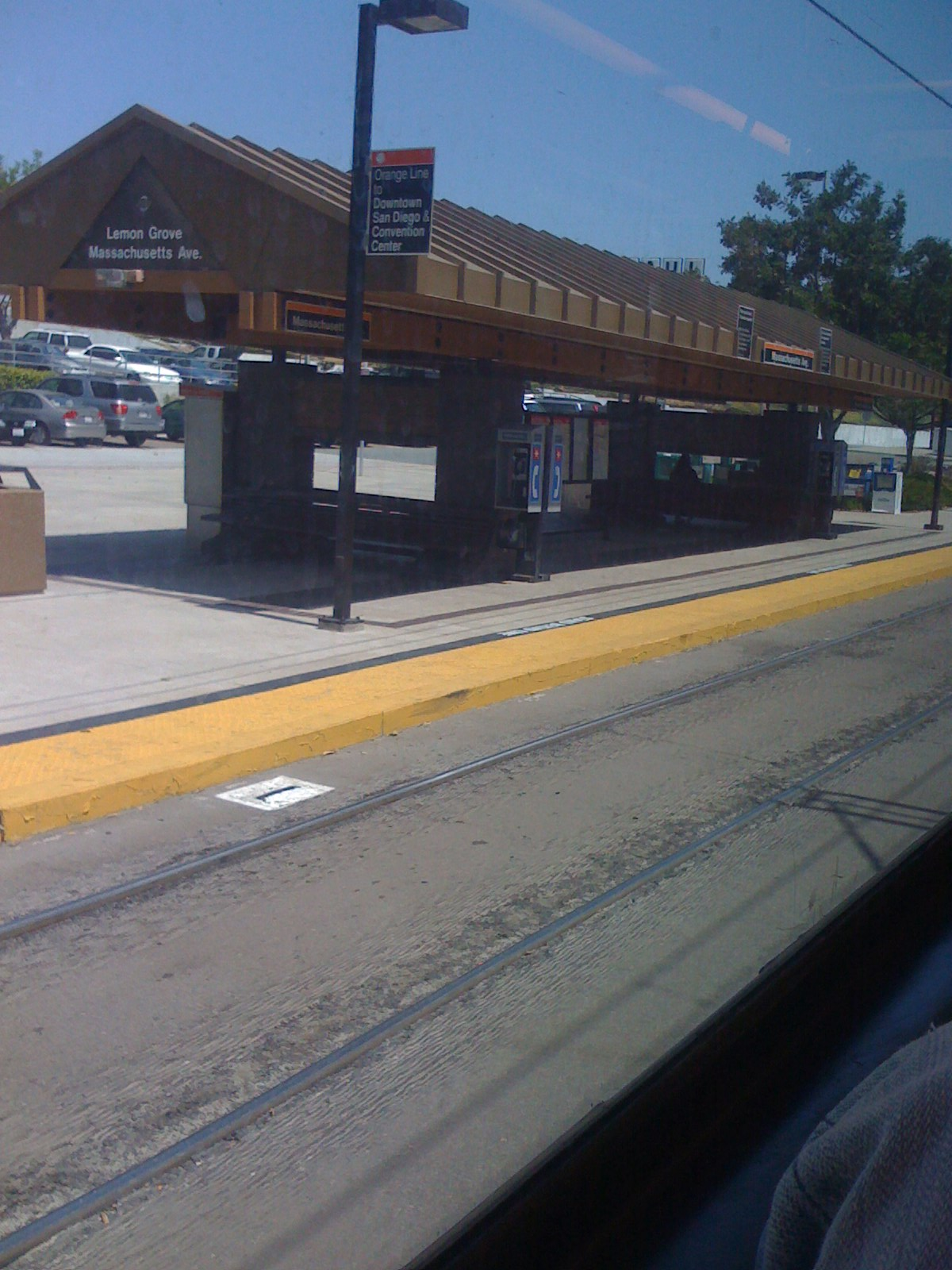
- Massachusetts Avenue station

General information
- Location: 1787 San Altos Place; Lemon Grove, California; United States
- Coordinates: 32°43′26″N 117°02′24″W
- Owner: San Diego Metropolitan Transit System
- Operator: San Diego Trolley
- Line: SD&AE La Mesa Branch
- Platforms: 2 side platforms
- Tracks: 2

Construction
- Structure type: At-grade
- Parking: 241 spaces
- Cycle facilities: 4 rack spaces, 1 locker
- Accessible: Disabled access

Other information
- Station code: 75040, 75041

History
- Opened: May 12, 1989
- Rebuilt: Fall 2012

Services
Preceding station	San Diego Trolley	Following station
Encanto/62nd Street toward Courthouse	Orange Line	Lemon Grove Depot toward El Cajon
Location

Massachusetts Avenue station is a station on the Orange Line of the San Diego Trolley located near the intersection of Massachusetts Avenue and Lemon Grove Avenue in Lemon Grove, California, a suburb of San Diego. The station serves as a commuter center and park and ride lot for the surrounding residential community.

== History ==
Massachusetts Avenue opened as part of the second segment of the Euclid Line on May 12, 1989. Also later known as the East Line, the line operated from 12th & Imperial to Spring Street before being extended further east one month later.

This station was renovated from October 17, 2011 through fall 2012 as part of the Trolley Renewal Project, although the station remained open during construction.

== See also ==
- List of San Diego Trolley stations
