= Encanto/62nd Street station =

San Diego Trolley station

Encanto/62nd Street
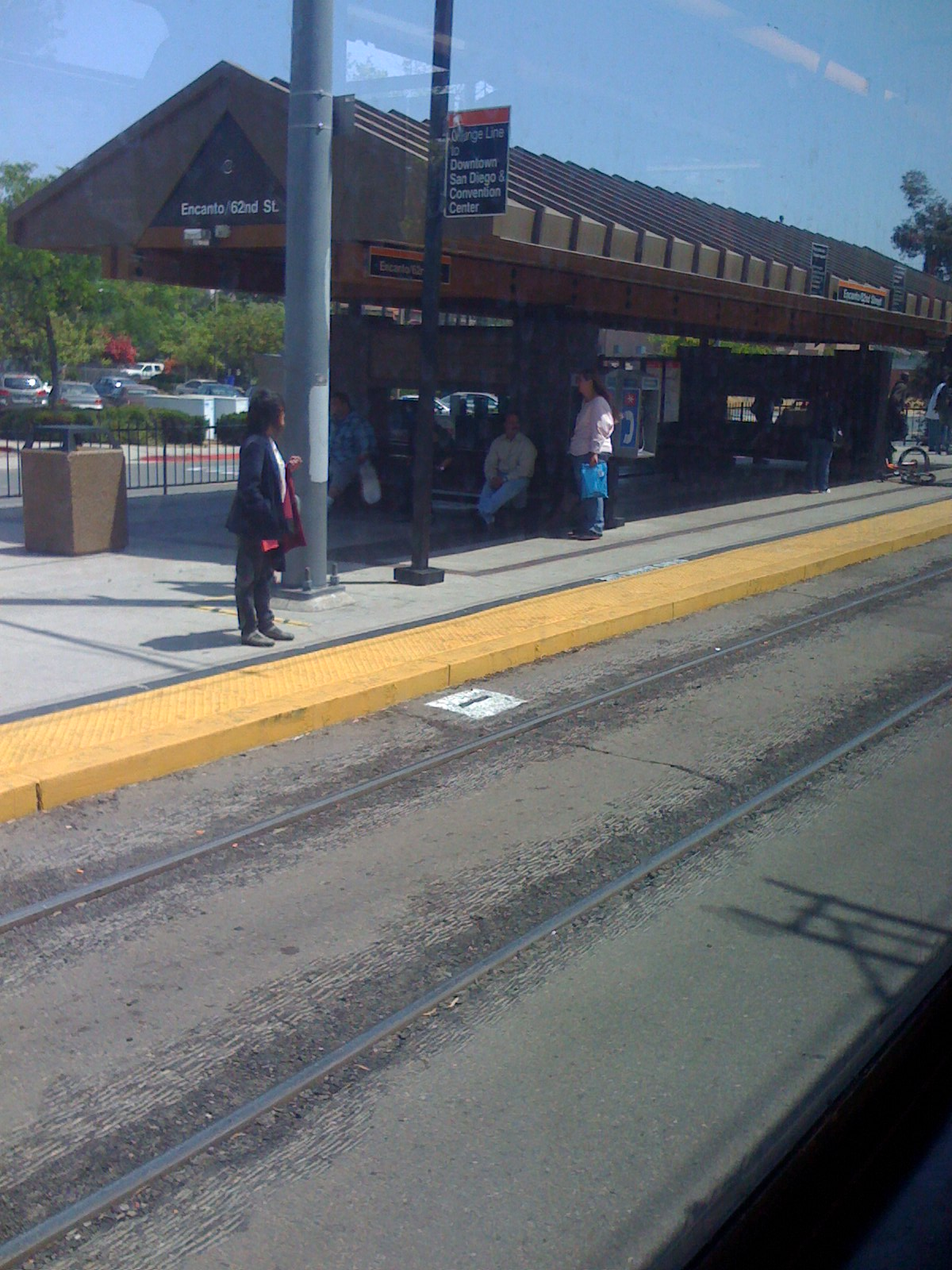
- Encanto / 62nd Street Station, 2008

General information
- Location: 6249 Akins Avenue; San Diego, California; United States
- Coordinates: 32°42′37″N 117°03′48″W
- Owner: San Diego Metropolitan Transit System
- Operator: San Diego Trolley
- Line: SD&AE La Mesa Branch
- Platforms: 2 side platforms
- Tracks: 2
- Connections: MTS: 4, 916, 917, 961

Construction
- Structure type: At-grade
- Parking: 158 spaces
- Cycle facilities: 4 rack spaces, 1 locker
- Accessible: Disabled access

Other information
- Station code: 75066, 75067

History
- Opened: May 12, 1989
- Rebuilt: 2012

Services
Preceding station	San Diego Trolley	Following station
Euclid Avenue toward Courthouse	Orange Line	Massachusetts Avenue toward El Cajon
Location

Encanto/62nd Street station is a station on the Orange Line of the San Diego Trolley. It is located near the intersection of 62nd Street and Imperial Avenue in the Encanto neighborhood of San Diego, California, and serves both nearby residences and as a park and ride facility.

== History ==
Encanto/62nd Street opened as part of the second segment of the Euclid Line on May 12, 1989. Also later known as the East Line, the line operated from 12th & Imperial to Spring Street before being extended further east one month later.

This station was renovated from October 17, 2011 through fall 2012 as part of the Trolley Renewal Project, although the station remained open during construction.

== See also ==
- List of San Diego Trolley stations
