= 25th & Commercial station =

San Diego Trolley station

25th & Commercial
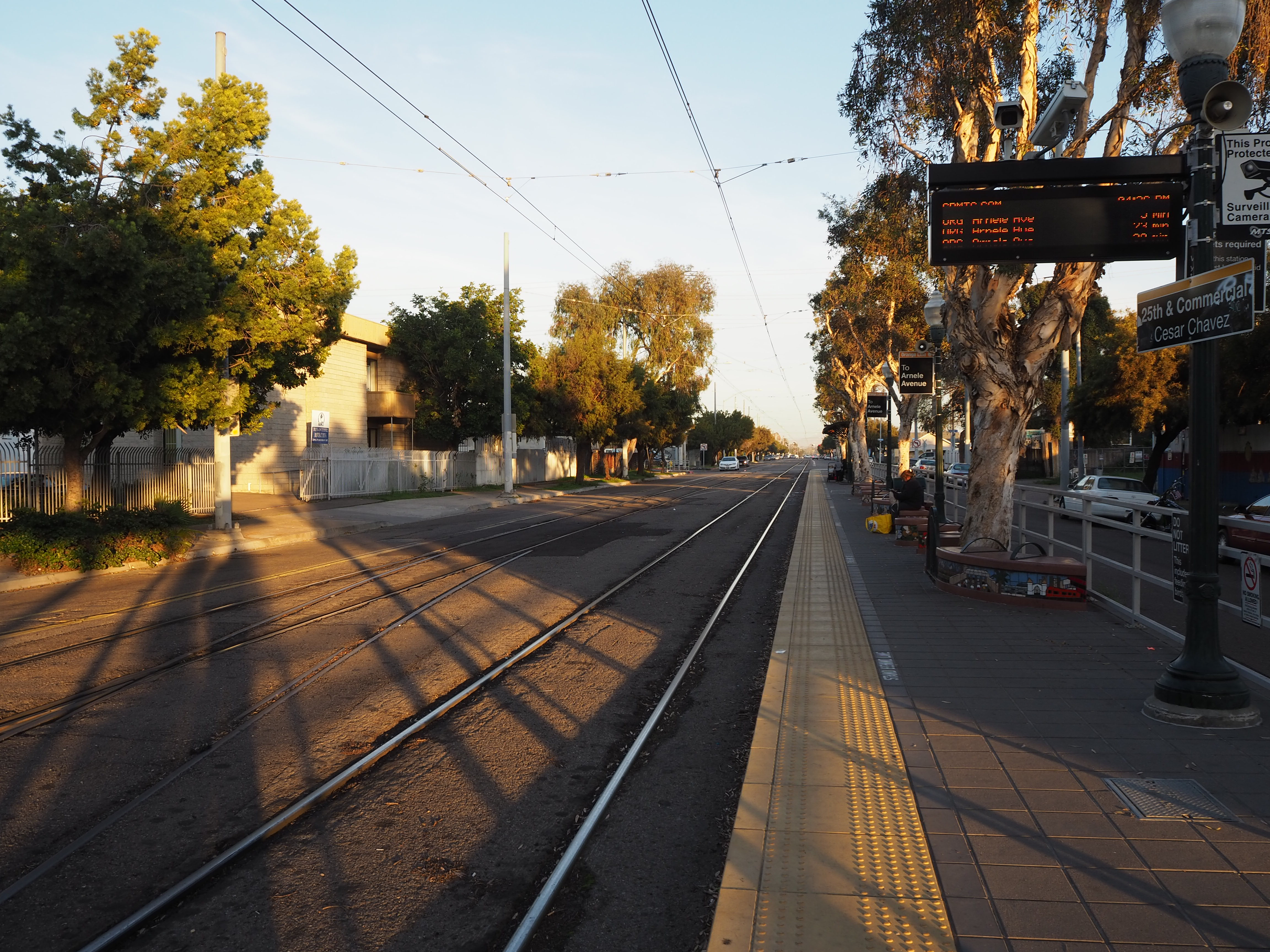
- 25th & Commercial station platform

General information
- Location: 10 25th Street; San Diego, California; United States
- Coordinates: 32°42′20″N 117°08′25″W
- Owner: San Diego Metropolitan Transit System
- Operator: San Diego Trolley
- Line: SD&AE La Mesa Branch
- Platforms: 2 split side platforms
- Tracks: 2
- Connections: MTS: 3

Construction
- Structure type: At-grade
- Accessible: Disabled access

Other information
- Station code: 75074, 75075

History
- Opened: March 23, 1986
- Rebuilt: 2012

Services
Preceding station	San Diego Trolley	Following station
12th & Imperial toward Courthouse	Orange Line	32nd & Commercial toward El Cajon
Location

25th & Commercial station is a station on the Orange Line of the San Diego Trolley located along Commercial Street between Harrison Avenue and 25th Street/César E. Chávez Parkway (formerly Crosby Street), in the Grant Hill neighborhood of San Diego, California. The stop is dedicated to Hispanic civil rights leader Cesar Chavez.

== History ==
25th & Commercial opened as part of the Euclid Line, the second original line of the San Diego Trolley system, on March 23, 1986. Also later known as the East Line, it operated from 12th & Imperial to Euclid Avenue before being extended in May 1989.

In 2006, an art installation titled Achievement/Progress/Community: In the Spirit of Cesar E. Chavez was added to the station, featuring mosaics along the platform planters, decorative benches, and a plaque with a quote from Chavez. The station became informally known as "25th & Commercial (Cesar E. Chavez)" in recognition of the dedication.

This station was closed from May 16 until August 2012 as part of the Trolley Renewal Project, during which a temporary stop was erected just to the west, between 22nd and 24th Streets, to serve the area.

=== Cesar Chavez naming controversy ===
In March 2026, The New York Times published an investigation containing allegations that Chavez had sexually abused several women, at least two of whom were minors at the time, during the peak of the farmworkers' rights movement in the 1970s. Among the accusers was Dolores Huerta, co-founder of the United Farm Workers, who alleged that Chavez had forced himself on her in encounters that resulted in unwanted pregnancies.

In the immediate aftermath, San Diego Mayor Todd Gloria signed an executive order on March 20, 2026, directing city departments to begin removing all public references to Chavez from city facilities, programs, and public assets. The city began renaming numerous Chavez-associated landmarks, including the nearby César E. Chávez Waterfront Park (renamed Port Park) and initiated a community input process for the renaming of César E. Chávez Parkway. California legislators also fast-tracked legislation to rename the state's March 31 César Chávez Day holiday to "Farmworkers Day." As of April 2026, the status of the station's Chavez dedication and artwork has not been publicly addressed by MTS.

== Station layout ==
There are two tracks running in the center of Commercial Street, each with a side platform. The westbound platform is to west of the 25th Street intersection while the eastbound platform is to the east.

== See also ==
- List of San Diego Trolley stations
- List of places named after Cesar Chavez
