= Lemon Grove Depot =

San Diego Trolley station

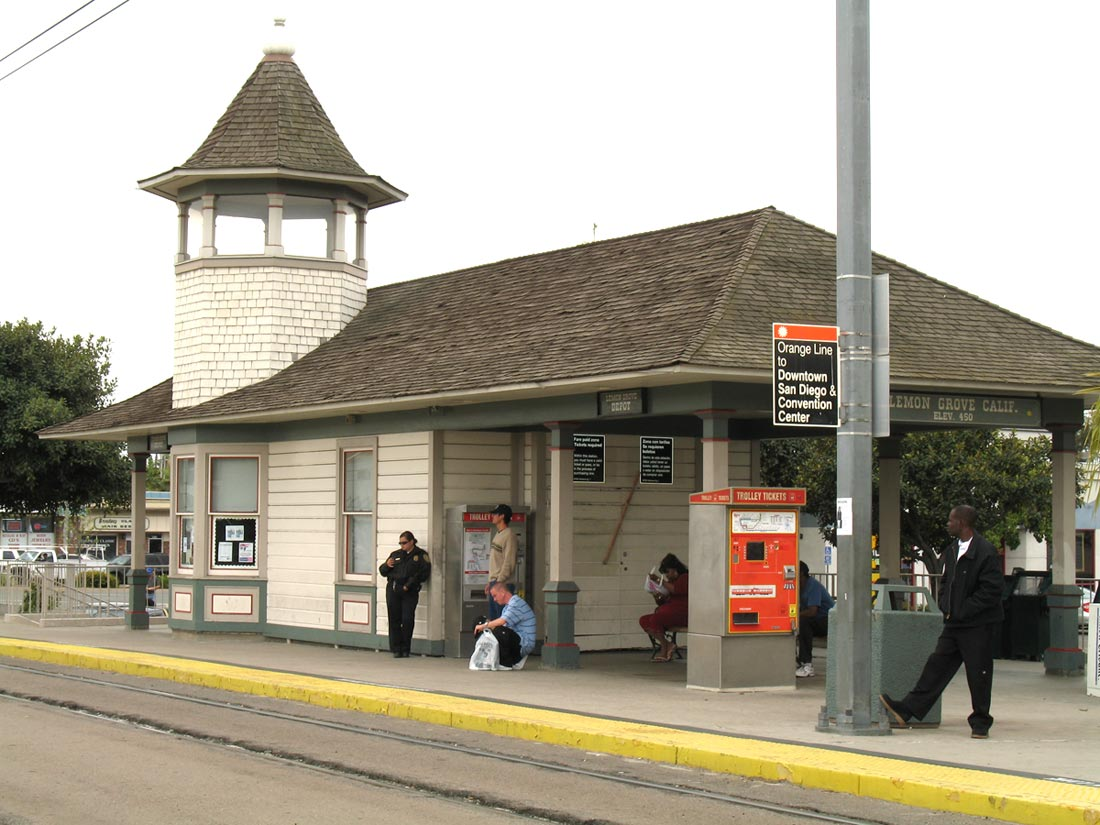
- The station building in 2008, before renovations

General information
- Location: 3443 Main Street; Lemon Grove, California; United States
- Coordinates: 32°44′36″N 117°01′51″W
- Owner: San Diego Metropolitan Transit System
- Operator: San Diego Trolley
- Line: SD&AE La Mesa Branch
- Platforms: 2 side platforms
- Tracks: 2
- Connections: MTS: 856, 936

Construction
- Structure type: At-grade
- Cycle facilities: 8 rack spaces, 2 lockers
- Accessible: Disabled access

Other information
- Station code: 75038, 75039

History
- Opened: May 12, 1989
- Rebuilt: Fall 2012
- Former names: Broadway Lemon Grove (1989–1990)

Services
Preceding station	San Diego Trolley	Following station
Massachusetts Avenue toward Courthouse	Orange Line	Spring Street toward El Cajon
Location

Lemon Grove Depot (formerly Broadway Lemon Grove station) is a station on the Orange Line of the San Diego Trolley. It is located near the intersection of Broadway and Lemon Grove Avenue in the San Diego suburb of Lemon Grove, California, and serves the densely populated surrounding commercial and residential area.

The station has also been home to a farmers market on Saturdays since January 2015.

== History ==
Lemon Grove Depot opened as part of the second segment of the Euclid Line on May 12, 1989. Also later known as the East Line, the line operated from 12th & Imperial to Spring Street before being extended further east one month later.

This station was renovated from winter 2012 through fall 2013 as part of the Trolley Renewal Project, although the station remained open during construction.

== Lemon Grove Promenade ==
Lemon Grove officials launched a $5.1 million project on redeveloping the immediate area surrounding the Lemon Grove Depot into a Promenade, which was designed to include a plaza, park, and two windmills to help generate electricity. Construction of this promenade began on July 19, 2012, with its grand opening ceremony held on September 27, 2013. The project subsequently won an award.

== See also ==
- List of San Diego Trolley stations
- Lemon Grove Historical Society
