= La Mesa Boulevard station =

San Diego Trolley station

La Mesa Boulevard
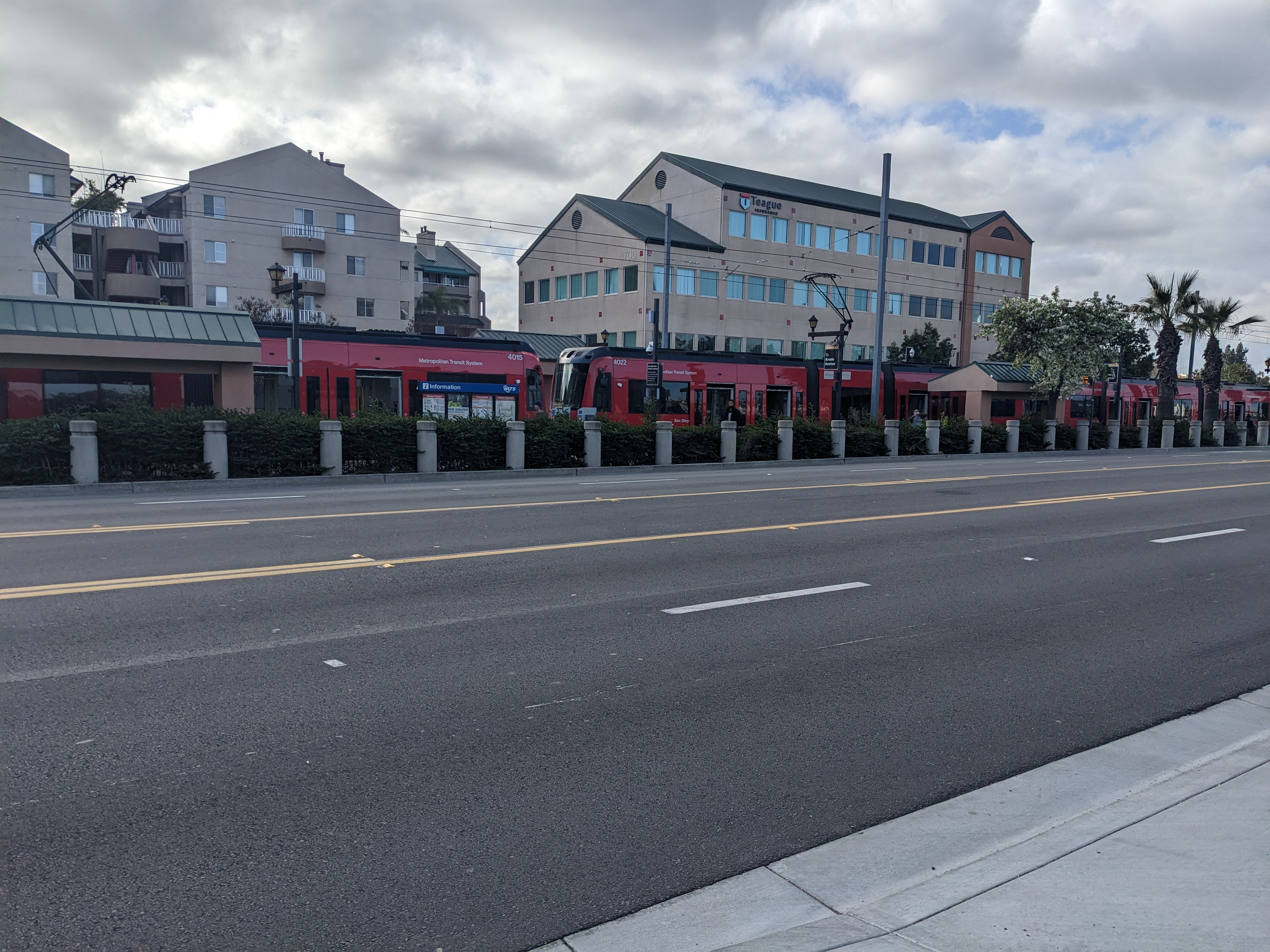
- A view of La Mesa Boulevard station from Spring Street

General information
- Location: 8248 La Mesa Boulevard; La Mesa, California; United States
- Coordinates: 32°45′52″N 117°01′13″W
- Owner: San Diego Metropolitan Transit System
- Operator: San Diego Trolley
- Line: SD&AE La Mesa Branch
- Platforms: 2 side platforms
- Tracks: 2
- Connections: MTS: 1, 852

Construction
- Structure type: At-grade
- Cycle facilities: 8 rack spaces, 2 lockers
- Accessible: Disabled access

Other information
- Station code: 75034, 75035

History
- Opened: June 23, 1989
- Rebuilt: 2012

Services
Preceding station	San Diego Trolley	Following station
Spring Street toward Courthouse	Orange Line	Grossmont toward El Cajon
Location

La Mesa Boulevard station is a station on the Orange Line of the San Diego Trolley located near the intersection of La Mesa Boulevard and Spring Street in the San Diego suburb of La Mesa, California. It serves the dense nearby commercial area, as well as a variety of apartment buildings that surround the stop.

Adjacent to the station is the historic La Mesa Depot Museum, owned by the Pacific Southwest Railway Museum. The museum is a restored station from 1894, and has original equipment from the era, including a steam locomotive and caboose. The station building was built in 1894, when the San Diego and Cuyamaca Railway was built, and it was moved across the tracks to its current site in 1915. Passenger service stopped in 1928, and did not restart until 1989 as part of the San Diego Trolley.

== History ==
La Mesa Boulevard opened as part of the third segment of the East Line on June 23, 1989, operated from 12th & Imperial to El Cajon. The line was extended to its current terminus in 1995.

This station was renovated from June 2012 through fall 2012 as part of the Trolley Renewal Project, although the station remained open during construction.

== See also ==
- List of San Diego Trolley stations
