= Grossmont Transit Center =

San Diego Trolley station

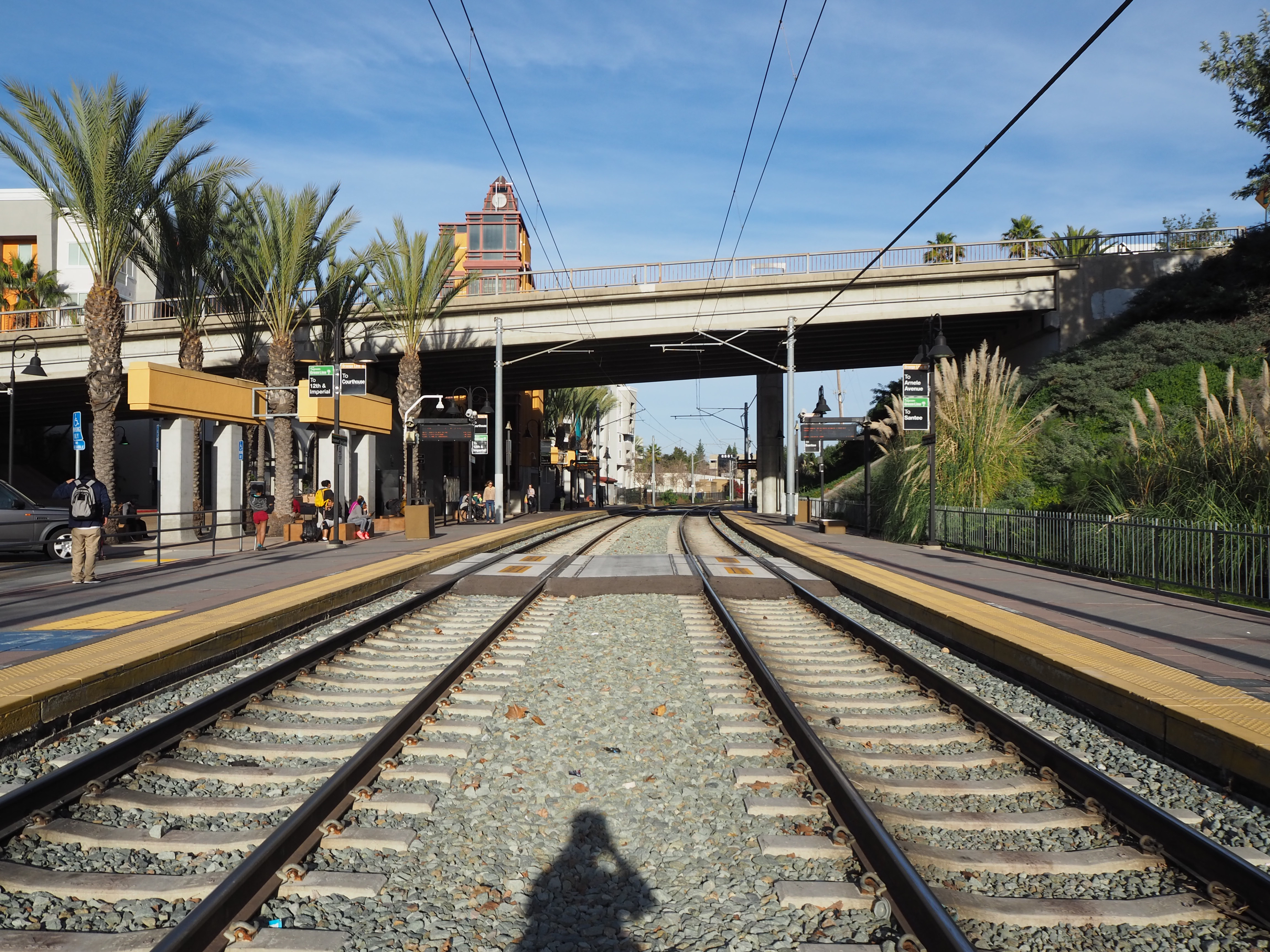
- Grossmont Transit Center station in May 2012

General information
- Location: 8601 Fletcher Parkway; La Mesa, California; United States
- Coordinates: 32°46′52″N 117°0′45″W
- Owner: San Diego Metropolitan Transit System
- Operator: San Diego Trolley
- Line: SD&AE La Mesa Branch
- Platforms: 2 side platforms
- Tracks: 2
- Connections: MTS: 852, 854

Construction
- Structure type: At-grade
- Parking: 220 spaces
- Cycle facilities: 6 rack spaces, 3 lockers
- Accessible: Disabled access

Other information
- Station code: 75030, 75031

History
- Opened: June 23, 1989
- Rebuilt: 2018

Services
Preceding station	San Diego Trolley	Following station
70th Street toward 12th & Imperial	Green Line	Amaya Drive toward El Cajon
La Mesa Boulevard toward Courthouse	Orange Line	Amaya Drive toward El Cajon
Location

Grossmont Transit Center is a San Diego Trolley station located next to Grossmont Center in La Mesa, California. The station is served by the Green Line and Orange Line and is located just east of the junction between the two lines. The station serves a variety of residences, a dense commercial area, Sharp Grossmont Hospital, and has a park and ride commuter lot.

== History ==
Grossmont Transit Center opened as part of the third segment of the East Line (now Orange Line) on June 23, 1989, which operated from 12th & Imperial to El Cajon. Green Line service began in July 2005, when the segment connecting to Mission San Diego first opened.

An improvement project broke ground on February 17, 2010, to add elevators and a pedestrian bridge to the station, which was completed and began operation on November 19, 2011.

== See also ==
- List of San Diego Trolley stations
