= 47th Street station (San Diego Trolley) =

San Diego Trolley station

47th Street
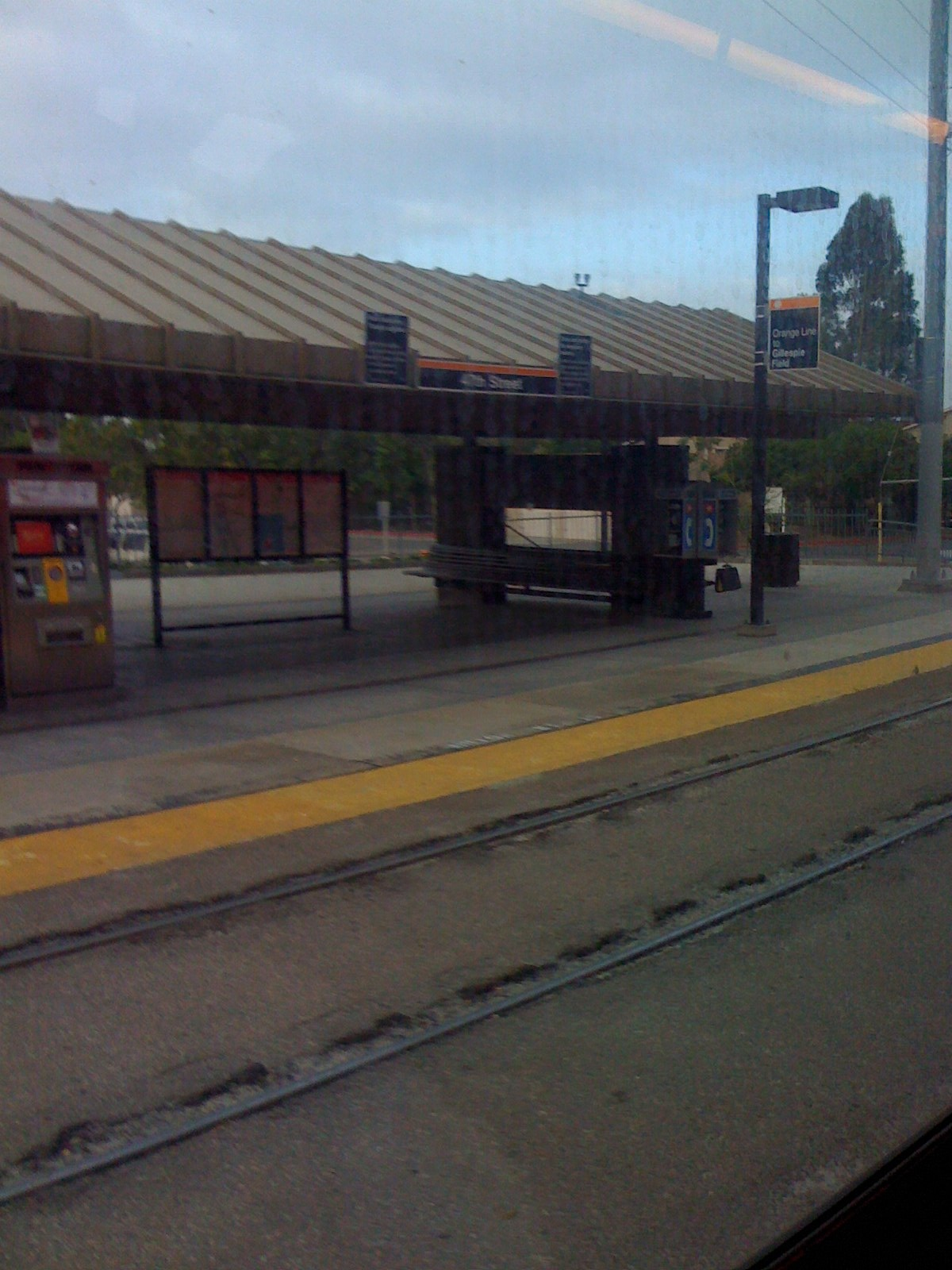

General information
- Location: 350 47th Street; San Diego, California; United States
- Coordinates: 32°42′28″N 117°05′37″W
- Owner: San Diego Metropolitan Transit System
- Operator: San Diego Trolley
- Line: SD&AE La Mesa Branch
- Platforms: 2 side platforms
- Tracks: 2
- Connections: MTS: 955

Construction
- Structure type: At-grade
- Parking: 129 spaces
- Accessible: Disabled access

Other information
- Station code: 75070, 75071

History
- Opened: March 23, 1986
- Rebuilt: 2012

Services
Preceding station	San Diego Trolley	Following station
32nd & Commercial toward Courthouse	Orange Line	Euclid Avenue toward El Cajon
Proposed services
Preceding station	Rapid	Following station
SR 94 toward Santa Fe Depot	Rapid 225 future infill station	E Plaza Blvd toward Otay Mesa
Location

47th Street station is a station on the Orange Line of the San Diego Trolley located on 47th Street in the Chollas View neighborhood of San Diego, California. The station primarily serves this mixed-income residential area and includes a park and ride lot. The 805 Freeway is accessible from Imperial Avenue to the south or Market Street to the north.

== History ==
47th Street opened as part of the Euclid Line, the second original line of the San Diego Trolley system, on March 23, 1986. Also later known as the East Line, it operated from 12th & Imperial to Euclid Avenue before being extended in May 1989.

This station was renovated from October 17, 2011 through fall 2012 as part of the Trolley Renewal Project, although the station remained open during construction.

== See also ==
- List of San Diego Trolley stations
