= Euclid Avenue station (San Diego Trolley) =

San Diego Trolley station

Euclid Avenue
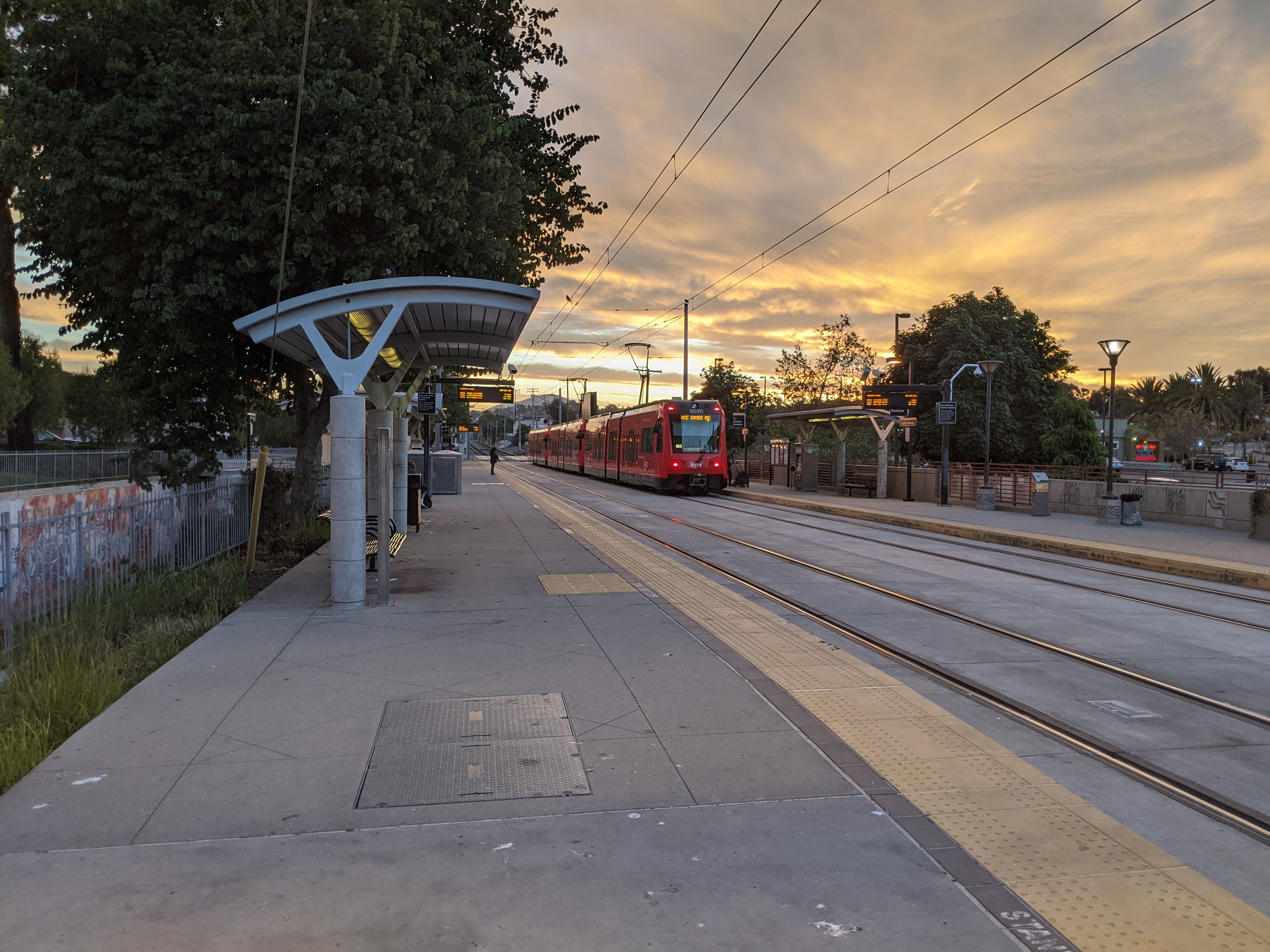
- Train approaching Euclid Avenue station platform

General information
- Location: 450 Euclid Avenue; San Diego, California; United States
- Coordinates: 32°42′35″N 117°05′06″W
- Owner: San Diego Metropolitan Transit System
- Operator: San Diego Trolley
- Line: SD&AE La Mesa Branch
- Platforms: 2 side platforms
- Tracks: 2
- Connections: MTS: 3, 4, 5, 13, 60, 916, 917, 955

Construction
- Structure type: At-grade
- Parking: 115 spaces
- Cycle facilities: 4 rack spaces, 1 locker
- Accessible: Disabled access

Other information
- Station code: 75068, 75069

History
- Opened: March 23, 1986
- Rebuilt: 2012

Services
Preceding station	San Diego Trolley	Following station
47th Street toward Courthouse	Orange Line	Encanto/62nd Street toward El Cajon
Location

Euclid Avenue station is a station on the Orange Line of the San Diego Trolley located near the intersection of Euclid Avenue and Market Street in the Chollas View neighborhood of San Diego, California. The station serves both nearby residences and is also a park and ride facility.

== History ==
Euclid Avenue opened as the original eastern terminus of the Euclid Line, the second original line of the San Diego Trolley system, on March 23, 1986. Also later known as the East Line, it operated from 12th & Imperial and was later extended further east to Spring Street in May 1989.

This station was renovated from June 2012 through fall 2012 as part of the Trolley Renewal Project, although the station remained open during construction.

== See also ==
- List of San Diego Trolley stations
