= Park & Market station =

San Diego Trolley station

Park & Market
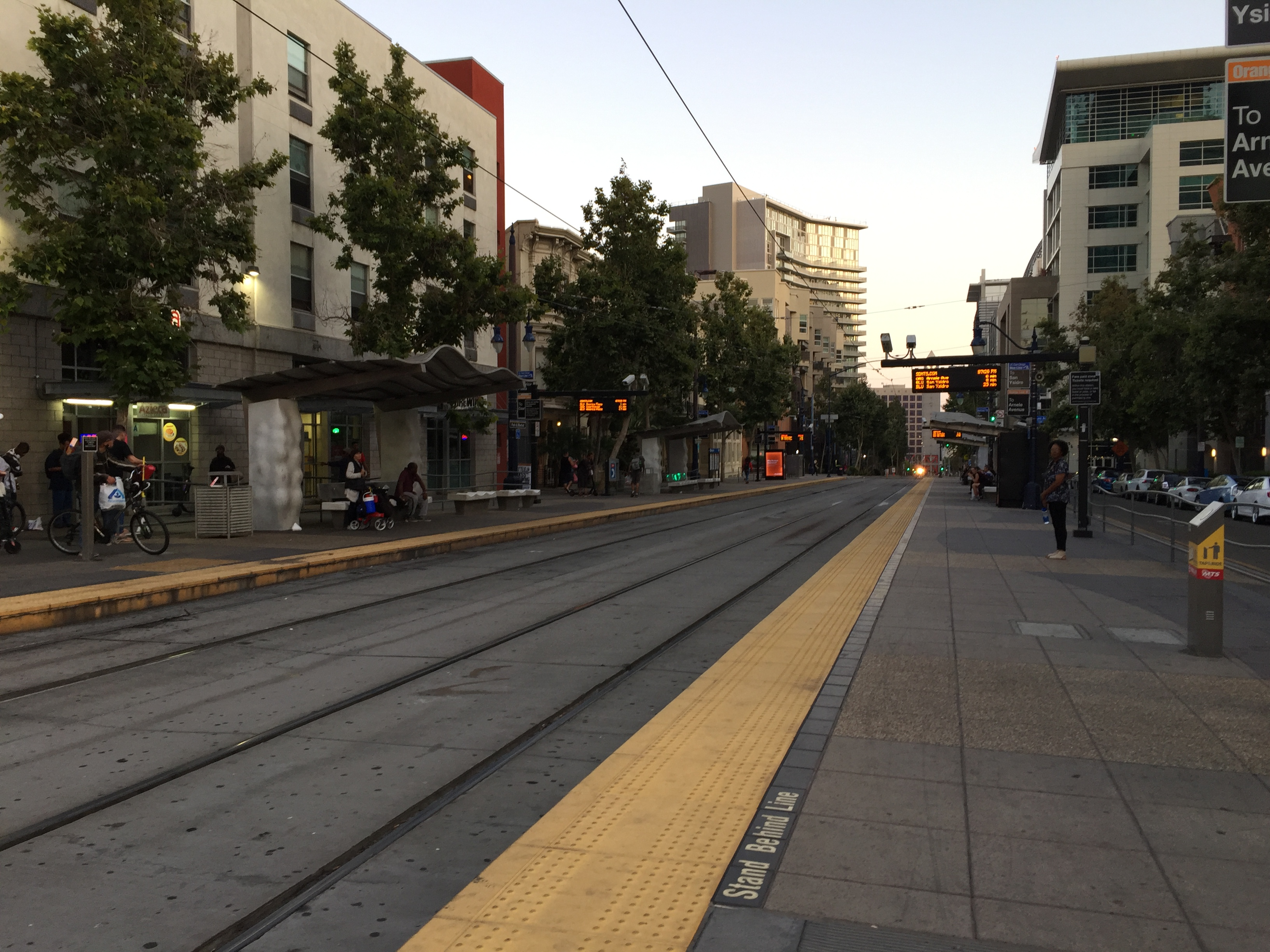
- Park & Market station in 2019

General information
- Location: 600 Park Boulevard; San Diego, California; United States
- Coordinates: 32°42′42″N 117°09′14″W
- Owner: San Diego Metropolitan Transit System
- Operator: San Diego Trolley
- Platforms: 2 side platforms
- Tracks: 2
- Connections: MTS: 3, 5

Construction
- Structure type: At-grade
- Accessible: Disabled access

Other information
- Station code: 75092, 75093

History
- Opened: July 26, 1981
- Rebuilt: 2004, 2012
- Former names: 12th & Market (1981–2004)

Services
Preceding station	San Diego Trolley	Following station
City College toward UTC	Blue Line	12th & Imperial toward San Ysidro
City College toward Courthouse	Orange Line	12th & Imperial toward El Cajon
City College One-way operation	Silver Line	12th & Imperial Next clockwise
Location

Park & Market station (formerly 12th & Market station) is a station of the Blue, Orange, and Silver Lines on the San Diego Trolley. It is located along Park Boulevard (formerly 12th Avenue) between Market Street and Island Avenue in the East Village neighborhood of the city. It serves the high density residential developments that surround the stop.

This station was renovated from July 9, 2012 until September 2012, as part of the Trolley Renewal Project.
