= City College station (San Diego) =

San Diego Trolley station

City College
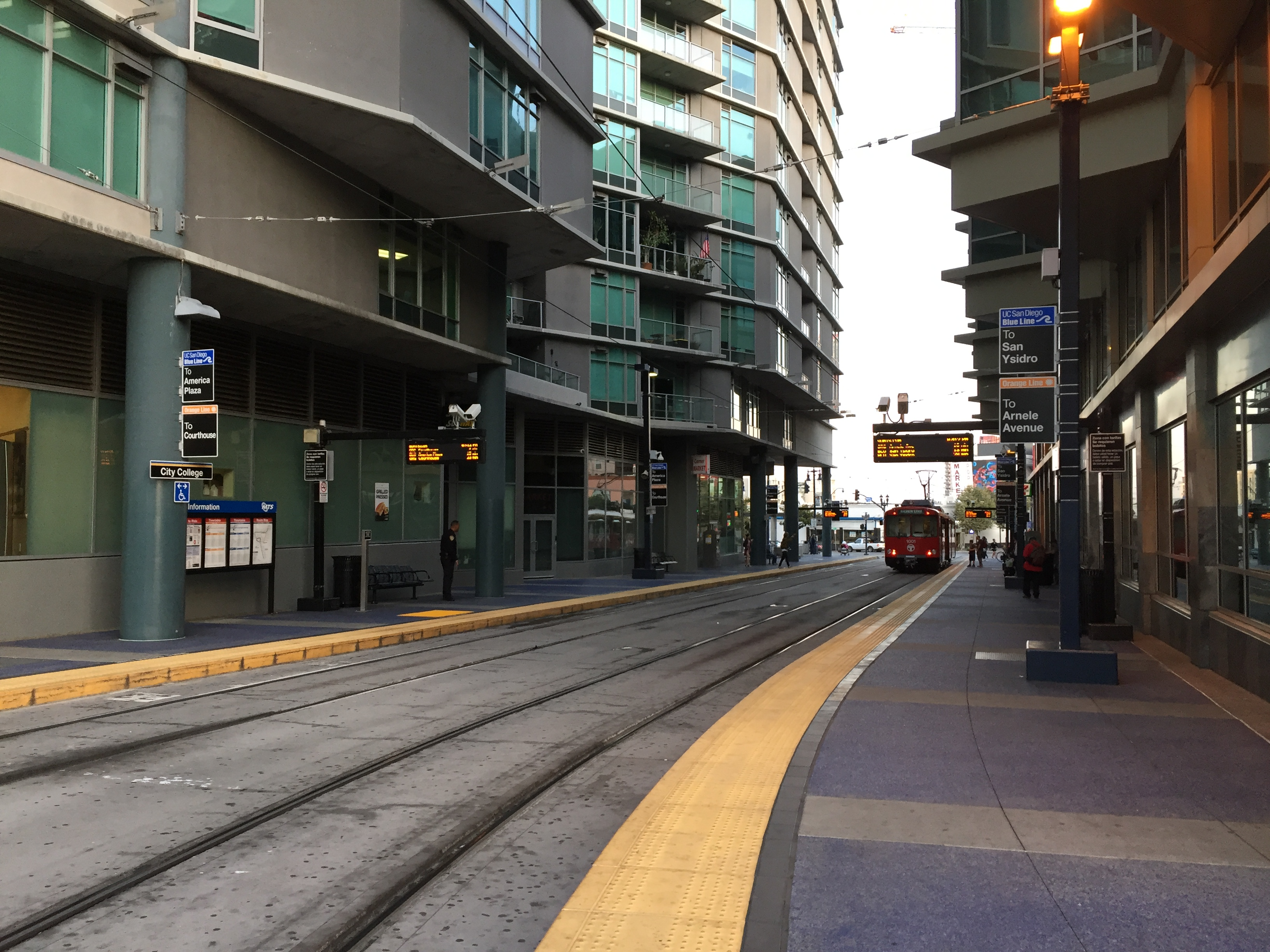
- City College station in 2019

General information
- Location: 1155 C Street; San Diego, California; United States
- Coordinates: 32°42′59″N 117°09′15″W
- Owner: San Diego Metropolitan Transit System
- Operator: San Diego Trolley
- Platforms: 2 side platforms
- Tracks: 2
- Connections: MTS: 2, 5, 7, 12, 20, 110, Rapid 215, Rapid 225, Rapid 235, Rapid Express 280, Rapid Express 290, 910 (Overnight Express), 992

Construction
- Structure type: At-grade
- Accessible: Disabled access

Other information
- Station code: 75090, 75091

History
- Opened: July 26, 1981
- Rebuilt: 2007, 2012

Services
Preceding station	San Diego Trolley	Following station
Fifth Avenue toward UTC	Blue Line	Park & Market toward San Ysidro
Fifth Avenue toward Courthouse	Orange Line	Park & Market toward El Cajon
Fifth Avenue One-way operation	Silver Line	Park & Market Next clockwise
Preceding station	Rapid	Following station
Horton Plaza toward Santa Fe Depot	Rapid 215	Naval Medical Center toward SDSU
Horton Plaza toward Santa Fe Depot	Rapid 225	East Palomar toward Otay Mesa
Horton Plaza toward Santa Fe Depot	Rapid 235	City Heights toward Escondido
Horton Plaza toward County Admin Center	Rapid Express 280	Del Lago toward Escondido
Horton Plaza toward County Admin Center	Rapid Express 290	Sabre Springs/Peñasquitos toward Rancho Bernardo
Proposed services
Preceding station	Rapid	Following station
Horton Plaza toward Santa Fe Depot	Rapid 225	SR 94 and other infill stations toward Otay Mesa
Location

City College station is a light rail station on the San Diego Trolley's Orange, Blue, and Silver Lines. It is located in the East Village neighborhood of the city, running diagonally through the Smart Corner mixed-use development at C Street, Park Boulevard, Broadway, and 11th Avenue. The station serves northeast downtown San Diego as well as students at San Diego City College and San Diego High School.

The station originally was curved, straddling the 90-degree intersection of C Street and Park Boulevard. In May 2007, a replacement station opened as part of the Smart Corner mixed-use development now surrounding it. The station was then closed from September 10, 2012 until November 16, 2012, for renovations as part of the Trolley Renewal Project, during which a temporary stop was erected one block away on C Street between 10th and 11th Avenues.
