= El Granito Springs =

Water source in California

Coordinates: 32.7772°N 116.9590°W

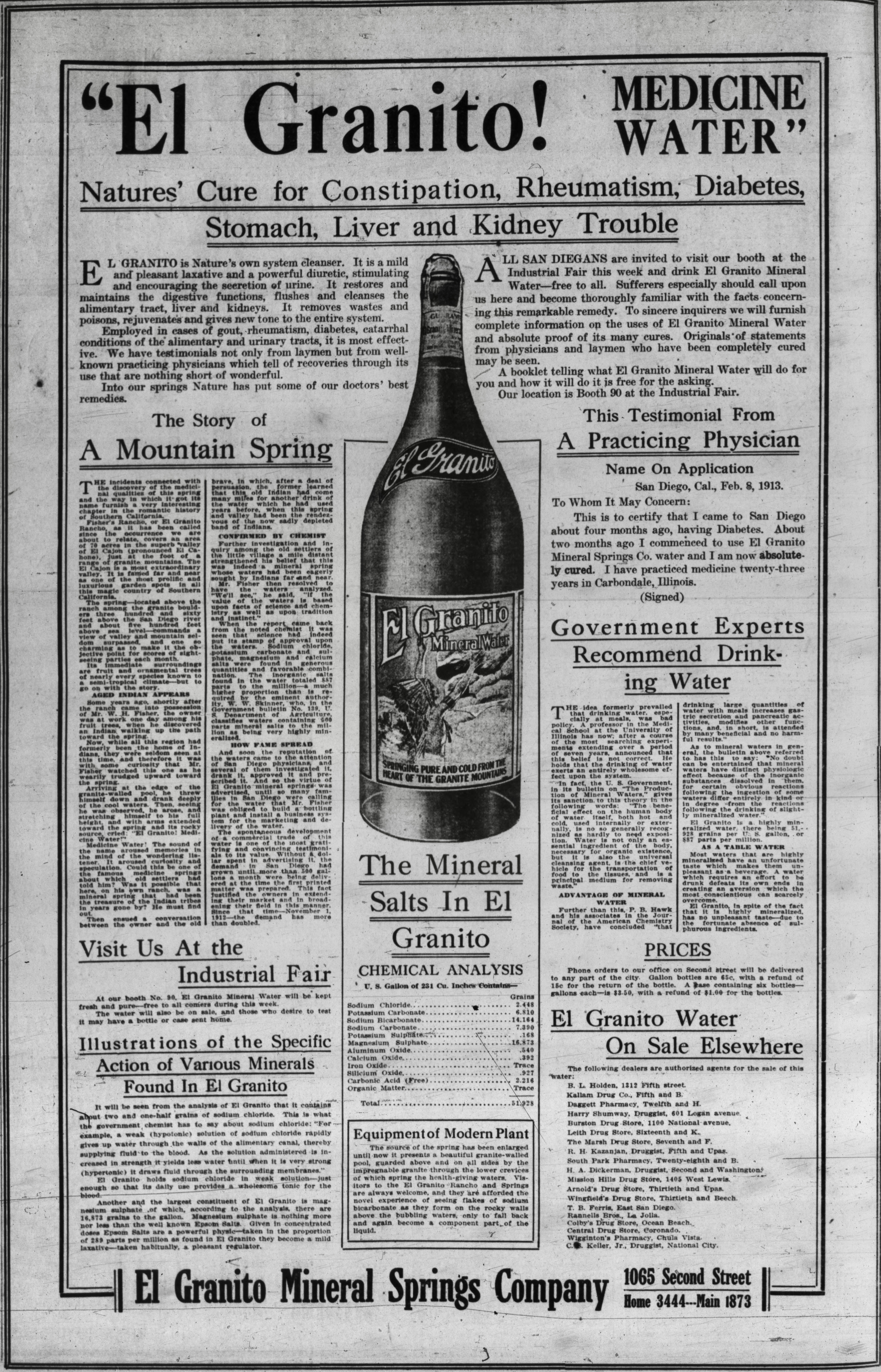
- Interactive map of El Granito Springs

El Granito Springs was a natural spring in the vicinity of present-day La Mesa in eastern San Diego County, California, United States. The springs were named for their location in a granite outcropping near the San Diego River.

== Description and history ==
During the Spanish–Mexican area of California history, a settler used the spring water for curing olives. The spring was first commercialized around 1876. In the early 20th century El Granito water was bottled and marketed to the public.

According to a U.S. government geologist in 1915, "El Granito Spring is at the base of the granitic slopes at the southern border of El Cajon Valley, 16 miles by railroad northeast of San Diego. The water issues in a small tunnel in decomposed granite at the side of a ravine and is piped about 50 yards to a bottling house. It has been on the local market for several years as a table water. [Chemical] analysis indicates that the water is primary saline and secondary alkaline in character and also has notable primary alkalinity."

The construction of Avocado Boulevard disrupted the hydrology of the springs and they ceased to flow in the 1970s.

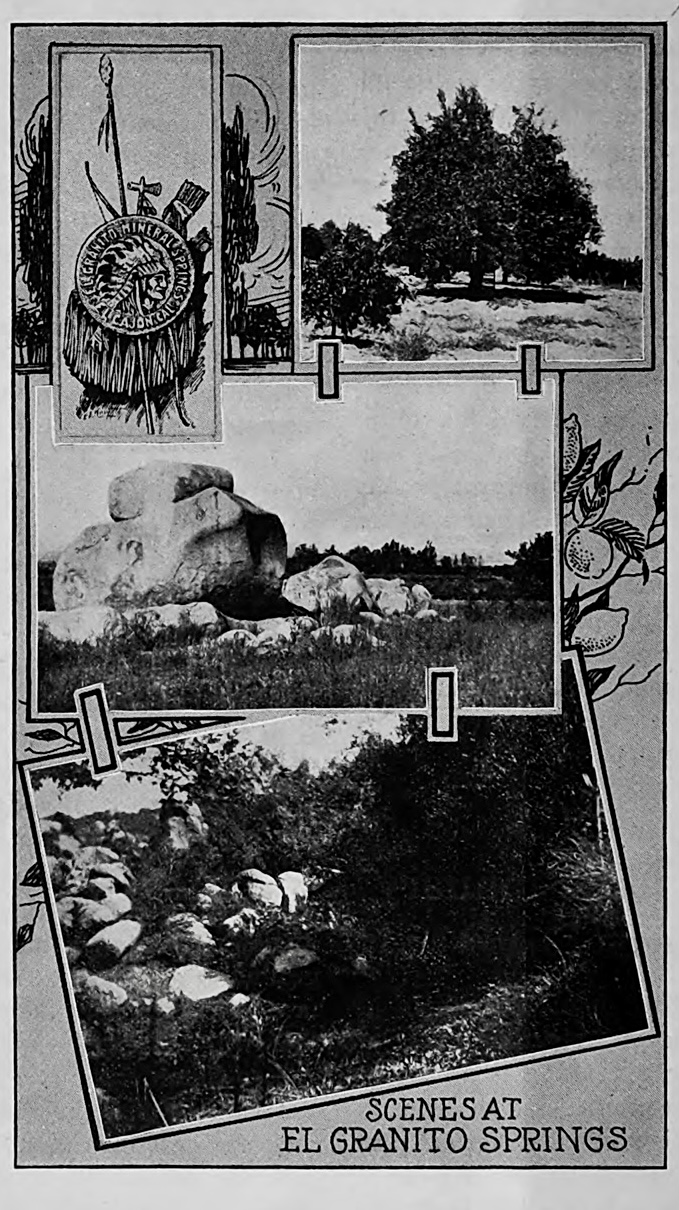
"Scenes at El Granito Springs" from California Garden magazine, 1912
