= Orange Line (San Diego Trolley) =

Light rail line in San Diego County, California

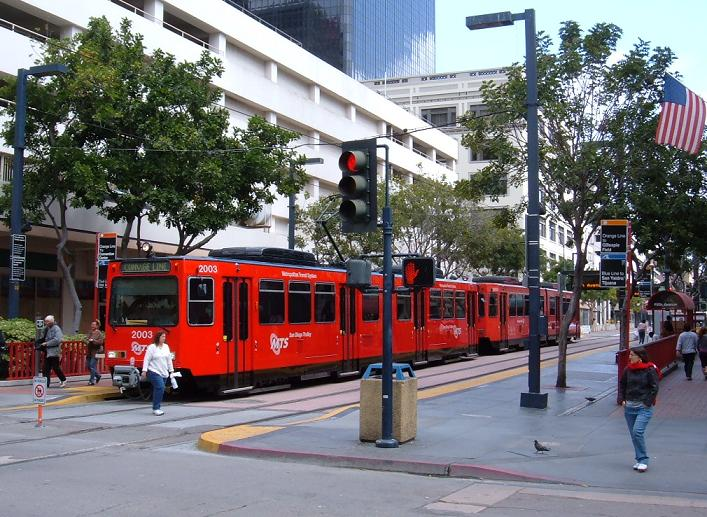
- Orange Line train at downtown San Diego; 5th Avenue Station (March 2008).

Overview
- Owner: San Diego Metropolitan Transit System
- Locale: San Diego, California
- Termini: Courthouse; El Cajon
- Stations: 18
- Website: SDMTS – Trolley

Service
- Type: Light rail
- System: San Diego Trolley
- Route number: 520 (Note: Internal documents only)
- Operator(s): San Diego Trolley, Inc.
- Rolling stock: 3-car trains
- Daily ridership: 19,273 (FY 2026)
- Ridership: 6,445,670 (FY 2026)

History
- Opened: March 23, 1986; 40 years ago

Technical
- Line length: 17.1 mi (27.5 km)
- Num of tracks: 2 tracks
- Track gauge: 4 ft 8 1/2 in (1,435 mm) (standard gauge)
- Electrification: Overhead line, 600 V DC
- Operating speed: 55 mph (89 km/h) (max)
Route map
Orange Line highlighted in orange

The Orange Line is a 17.1-mile (27.5 km) light rail line in the San Diego Trolley system, operated by San Diego Trolley, Inc. an operating division of the San Diego Metropolitan Transit System (MTS). The route connects downtown San Diego with the cities of Lemon Grove, La Mesa, and El Cajon. The Orange Line has the lowest ridership of the San Diego Trolley's three core lines, transporting 10,896,289 riders during FY 2014 according to the MTS.

It is one of five lines in the trolley system, along with the Blue, Green, Copper and Silver ("heritage weekend" service only) lines.

At night, the San Diego and Imperial Valley Railroad uses the Orange Line right of way east of the rail yard near 12th & Imperial Transit Center for its freight service to El Cajon and Santee.

== History ==
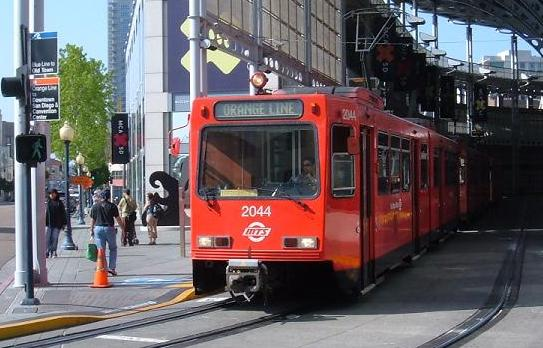
Orange Line train at Downtown San Diego America Plaza (January 2008).

The Orange Line is the second line in the San Diego Trolley system. Service began on March 23, 1986, originally as the East Line and initially operated between downtown San Diego and Euclid Avenue. The East Line, as it was then called, kept this name after successive extensions to Spring Street on May 12, 1989, to El Cajon Transit Center on June 23, 1989, along the Bayside in downtown San Diego on June 30, 1990, and finally to Santee Town Center on August 26, 1995.

The line was renamed the Orange Line in 1997. Service between Gillespie Field and Santee Town Center was replaced by the Green Line in July 2005 upon that line's introduction.

=== 2012 realignment ===
During a system redesign on September 2, 2012, the Orange Line's eastern terminus was further shortened to El Cajon Transit Center, while Orange Line service along the Bayside was eliminated and its western terminus was rerouted to Santa Fe Depot in downtown San Diego.

=== Trolley Renewal Project ===
To accommodate the new Siemens S70 models so that they could be used on the line, Trolley stations needed to undergo renovation, although this was done over a period of time to prevent the disruption of operation. The new S70 models began operation on the Orange Line in January 2013, once all remaining Orange Line stations had been upgraded to handle them, and all renovation work on the Orange Line was completed in 2013.

=== 2017 and 2018 realignment ===
On July 11, 2017, the Orange Line was once again realigned to terminate at America Plaza instead of Santa Fe Depot. MTS says the change should help improve on-time performance of the Orange Line and relieve train congestion at Santa Fe Depot.

In order to alleviate train congestion at America Plaza in preparation for the Blue Line's Mid-Coast Extension to UC San Diego and UTC, MTS constructed a new station, Courthouse, which serves as the new western terminus for the Orange Line. Courthouse station is a single platform, single-track station located on C Street between State Street and Union Street. The station, which opened April 29, 2018, serves as a layover point for Orange Line trains three blocks to the east of America Plaza. The line was also re-extended north one station at this time to Arnele Avenue, which serves as a convenient layover for Orange Line trains instead of the busier El Cajon Transit Center one station to the south.

=== East County Connector Project ===
The northern terminus of the Orange Line would change once more with the completion of the East County Connector project in 2024, finally bringing a proper third track to El Cajon station for Green, Orange, and Copper Line trains.

In May 2024, MTS proposed a new Trolley line to take over service from the Green Line between El Cajon and Santee. Known as the East County Connector project (and later the Copper Line), the proposal was prompted by service issues caused by the merge of double track to single track between the final two stations, creating delays for Green Line trolleys waiting for the track to clear and occasional cancellations at eastern stations when trains turn around early to prevent the delays. On September 29, 2024, Copper Line service began, and Orange Line Trolleys were cut back to El Cajon station.

== Stations ==
Station	Location	Connections
America Plaza (limited service) (Note: Western terminal for three late-night westbound Orange Line trains.)	Core, San Diego	Blue Line Silver Line
Courthouse (Note: Western terminal for nearly all Orange Line trains.)	Core, San Diego	
Civic Center (Note: Western terminal for two early-morning eastbound Orange Line trains on weekdays.)	Core, San Diego	Blue Line Silver Line
Fifth Avenue	Core, San Diego	Blue Line Silver Line; MTS: 3, 120
City College	East Village, San Diego	Blue Line Silver Line; MTS: 2, 5, 7, 12, 20, 110, Rapid 215, Rapid 225, Rapid 235, Rapid Express 280, Rapid Express 290, 910 (Overnight Express), 923, 992
Park & Market	East Village, San Diego	Blue Line Silver Line; MTS: 3, 5, 12
12th & Imperial	East Village, San Diego	Blue Line Green Line Silver Line; MTS: 4, 12, 901, 910 (Overnight Express), 929; Greyhound Lines; Park and ride: 1,020 spaces, paid
25th & Commercial (Note: Western terminal for two early-morning eastbound Orange Line trains.)	Grant Hill, San Diego	MTS: 3
32nd & Commercial	Stockton, San Diego	
47th Street	Chollas View, San Diego	MTS: 955; Park and ride: 129 spaces
Euclid Avenue	Emerald Hills, San Diego	MTS: 3, 4, 5, 13, 60, 916, 917, 955; Park and ride: 115 spaces
Encanto/62nd Street	Encanto, San Diego	MTS: 4, 916, 917, 961; Park and ride: 158 spaces
Massachusetts Avenue	Lemon Grove	Park and ride: 241 spaces
Lemon Grove Depot	Lemon Grove	MTS: 856, 936
Spring Street	La Mesa	MTS: 851, 855; Park and ride: 324 spaces
La Mesa Blvd.	La Mesa	MTS: 852
Grossmont	La Mesa	Green Line; MTS: 852, 854; Park and ride: 220 spaces
Amaya Drive	La Mesa	Green Line; Park and ride: 236 spaces
El Cajon	El Cajon	Green Line Copper Line; MTS: 115, 815, 816, 833, 848, 864, 872, 874, 875, 888, 891, 892, 894; Greyhound Lines; Sycuan Casino Shuttle; Park and ride: 469 spaces

== Future ==
=== Possible extension to San Diego International Airport ===
In January 2013, San Diego Mayor Bob Filner and SANDAG conducted talks about a possible trolley extension to San Diego International Airport. SANDAG has been conducting feasibility studies on an extension to Lindbergh Field since 2009. There are many different plans and scenarios for such an extension, but one of the possible scenarios is to extend the Orange Line from downtown San Diego up N. Harbor Drive to the passenger terminals on the south side of Lindbergh Field, with possible stops along the way. Currently, there is no projected start or completion date for such a proposed extension of the Orange Line to Lindbergh Field.
