= La Mesa, California =

- City
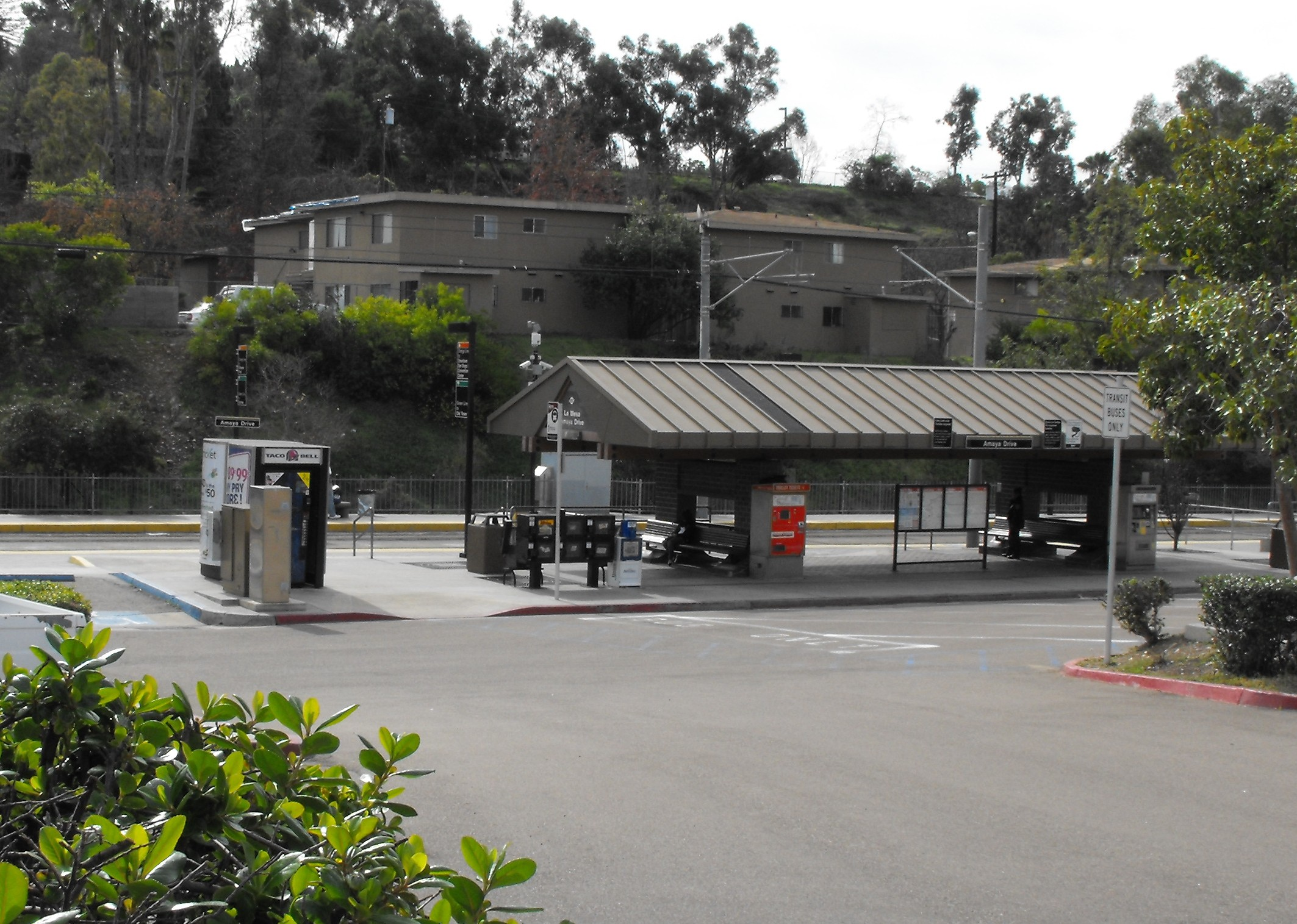
- Amaya Drive Trolley Station

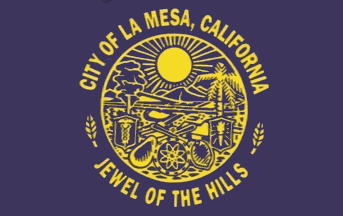
- Flag
- Motto: "Jewel of the Hills"
- Interactive map of La Mesa, California
- Location in the United States
- Coordinates: 32°46′17″N 117°1′22″W
- Country: United States
- State: California
- County: San Diego
- Incorporated: February 16, 1912

Government
  - Type: Council / manager
  - Mayor: Mark Arapostathis
  - Vice mayor: Lauren Cazares
  - Councilmember: Patricia Dillard, Laura Lothian, Genevieve Suzuki
  - City Treasurer: Matt Strabone

Area
  - Total: 9.10 sq mi (23.56 km^{2})
  - Land: 9.09 sq mi (23.55 km^{2})
  - Water: 0 sq mi (0.00 km^{2}) 0.05%
- Elevation: 528 ft (161 m)

Population (2020)
  - Total: 61,121
  - Density: 6,514.7/sq mi (2,515.34/km^{2})
- Time zone: UTC−8 (Pacific)
  - Summer (DST): UTC−7 (PDT)
- ZIP codes: 91941–91944
- Area code: 619
- FIPS code: 06-40004
- GNIS feature IDs: 1660859, 2411576
- Website: www.cityoflamesa.gov

La Mesa (lit. 'The Table') is a city in San Diego County, California, United States, located nine miles (14 kilometers) east of downtown San Diego in Southern California. The population was 61,121 at the 2020 census, up from 57,065 at the 2010 census. Its civic motto is "the Jewel of the Hills."

== History ==
Before European colonization, the area that is now La Mesa was home to the Kumeyaay. The Kumeyaay were a Yuman-speaking people who practiced horticulture and hunting and gathering. The Kumeyaay organized themselves into a federation of self-governed bands, or clans. Beginning in 1769, the Kumeyaay of La Mesa and the larger San Diego County region were enslaved by Spanish colonists or later forcibly relocated to reservations.

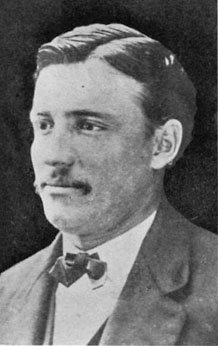
La Mesa was originally part of Rancho El Cajón, a Mexican era rancho grant owned by the family of Don Miguel de Pedrorena, a Californio ranchero and signer of the Californian Constitution.

La Mesa in Spanish means "the table", or alternately "the plateau", relating to its geography. La Mesa was part of a larger tract, Mission San Diego de Alcalá, and was used by Spanish missionaries.

Through the years, the Spanish, Mexican, and American settlers valued La Mesa for its natural springs. In 1868, stockman Robert Allison moved to the area and purchased 4,000 acres of land from the heirs of Santiago Arguello, commandant of the Presidio of San Diego. This land became La Mesa, and the "Allison" natural springs were renamed the "La Mesa Springs." The importance of the springs is still reflected today in the name of the prominent "Spring Street," which passes through downtown La Mesa, and with the preservation of the spring house in Collier Park.

La Mesa was founded in 1869 and The City of La Mesa was incorporated on February 16, 1912. Its official flower is the bougainvillea.

In 2020, La Mesa was the site of civil unrest in the wake of the murder of George Floyd in Minneapolis, Minnesota. Two days after Floyd's murder, an unarmed black man was grabbed and shoved by a white La Mesa Police officer and arrested at Grossmont Transit Center. The video of the incident went viral and led to more than 1000 protesters converging on the city. An African-American grandmother was shot in the face with a bean bag round from police. Businesses were looted and several structures were set on fire, including two banks that burned to the ground. The officer in the trolley station incident, Matthew Dages, was charged with falsifying a police report in connection with the reason for the arrest but acquitted in December 2021. Dages' certification was revoked under a new state law due to serious misconduct in 2025.

== Geography ==
La Mesa is bordered by the city of San Diego on the west and north, Spring Valley and Lemon Grove on the south, and El Cajon on the east. It includes the neighborhood of Grossmont.

According to the United States Census Bureau, the city has a total area of 9.1 square miles (24 km^{2}). 9.1 square miles (24 km^{2}) of it is land and 0.04 square miles (0.10 km^{2}) of it (0.05%) is water.

=== Climate ===
La Mesa is approximately 10 mi (16 km) east of the Pacific Ocean. Because of this, La Mesa typically experiences more extreme temperatures than San Diego, most of which lies closer to the Pacific Ocean. La Mesa has a Semi-arid Steppe climate. La Mesa typically has hot, dry summers and warm winters with most of the annual precipitation falling between November and March. The city has dry weather with around 13 inches (330 millimeters) of annual precipitation. Summer temperatures are generally hot, with average highs of 78–92 °F (26–33 °C) and lows of 56–68 °F (13–20 °C). Winter temperatures are warm, with average high temperatures of 66–77 °F (19–25 °C) and lows of 46–58 °F (8–14 °C).

The climate in the San Diego area, like much of California, often varies significantly over short geographical distances, resulting in micro-climates. In San Diego's case, this is mainly due to the city's topography (the Bay, and the numerous hills, mountains, and canyons). Frequently, particularly during the "May gray/June gloom" period, a thick "marine layer" cloud cover will keep the air cool and damp within a few miles of the coast, but will yield to bright cloudless sunshine approximately 5–10 miles (8–16 km) inland. This happens every year in May and June. Even in the absence of June gloom, inland areas tend to experience higher temperatures than areas closer to the coast.

Climate data for La Mesa, California, 1981–2010 normals, extremes 1934–2006
Month	Jan	Feb	Mar	Apr	May	Jun	Jul	Aug	Sep	Oct	Nov	Dec	Year
Record high °F (°C)	90 (32)	92 (33)	96 (36)	105 (41)	100 (38)	103 (39)	106 (41)	106 (41)	109 (43)	105 (41)	99 (37)	100 (38)	109 (43)
Mean daily maximum °F (°C)	69.4 (20.8)	69.3 (20.7)	70.5 (21.4)	73.8 (23.2)	75.4 (24.1)	79.1 (26.2)	84.0 (28.9)	85.9 (29.9)	85.3 (29.6)	79.3 (26.3)	73.6 (23.1)	68.9 (20.5)	76.2 (24.6)
Daily mean °F (°C)	57.9 (14.4)	58.4 (14.7)	60.1 (15.6)	63.2 (17.3)	65.9 (18.8)	69.4 (20.8)	73.7 (23.2)	75.3 (24.1)	74.1 (23.4)	68.4 (20.2)	62.2 (16.8)	57.4 (14.1)	65.5 (18.6)
Mean daily minimum °F (°C)	46.5 (8.1)	47.5 (8.6)	49.7 (9.8)	52.6 (11.4)	56.5 (13.6)	59.8 (15.4)	63.4 (17.4)	64.7 (18.2)	62.7 (17.1)	57.6 (14.2)	50.8 (10.4)	45.9 (7.7)	54.8 (12.7)
Record low °F (°C)	26 (−3)	31 (−1)	34 (1)	31 (−1)	41 (5)	47 (8)	46 (8)	49 (9)	45 (7)	30 (−1)	30 (−1)	29 (−2)	26 (−3)
Average precipitation inches (mm)	2.40 (61)	2.41 (61)	2.41 (61)	0.92 (23)	0.15 (3.8)	0.08 (2.0)	0.04 (1.0)	0.03 (0.76)	0.21 (5.3)	0.69 (18)	1.45 (37)	1.89 (48)	12.68 (321.86)
Average precipitation days (≥ 0.01 in)	5.4	5.6	5.5	3.6	1.4	0.7	0.4	0.5	1.0	2.1	3.7	4.9	34.8
Source 1: NOAA
Source 2: National Weather Service

== Transportation ==
The City of La Mesa is served by the San Diego Trolley's Orange Line at its stations in Spring Street, La Mesa Boulevard, Grossmont Transit Center, and Amaya Drive, the last two of which are also served by the Green Line.

By car, the city is served by Interstate 8, California State Route 94, and California State Route 125.

== Demographics ==
Historical population
Census	Pop.	Note	%±
1920	1,004		—
1930	2,513		150.3%
1940	3,925		56.2%
1950	10,946		178.9%
1960	30,441		178.1%
1970	39,178		28.7%
1980	50,308		28.4%
1990	52,931		5.2%
2000	54,749		3.4%
2010	57,065		4.2%
2020	61,121		7.1%
U.S. Decennial Census; 1860–1870 1880-1890; 1900 1910 1920; 1930 1940 1950; 1960 1970 1980; 1990 2000 2010; 2020

=== Racial and ethnic composition ===
La Mesa city, California – Racial and ethnic composition Note: the US Census treats Hispanic/Latino as an ethnic category. This table excludes Latinos from the racial categories and assigns them to a separate category. Hispanics/Latinos may be of any race.
Race / Ethnicity (NH = Non-Hispanic)	Pop 2000	Pop 2010	Pop 2020	% 2000	% 2010	% 2020
White alone (NH)	40,371	35,295	32,644	73.74%	61.85%	53.41%
Black or African American alone (NH)	2,561	4,102	3,954	4.68%	7.19%	6.47%
Native American or Alaska Native alone (NH)	260	249	187	0.47%	0.44%	0.31%
Asian alone (NH)	2,177	3,152	3,935	3.98%	5.52%	6.44%
Native Hawaiian or Pacific Islander alone (NH)	183	272	312	0.33%	0.48%	0.51%
Other race alone (NH)	108	160	350	0.20%	0.28%	0.57%
Mixed race or Multiracial (NH)	1,687	2,139	4,053	3.08%	3.75%	6.63%
Hispanic or Latino (any race)	7,402	11,696	15,686	13.52%	20.50%	25.66%
Total	54,749	57,065	61,121	100.00%	100.00%	100.00%

=== 2020 census ===
As of the 2020 census, La Mesa had a population of 61,121, and the population density was 6,723.2 inhabitants per square mile (2,595.8/km^{2}). The census reported that 100.0% of residents lived in urban areas and 0.0% lived in rural areas. It also reported that 98.1% of the population lived in households, 0.3% lived in non-institutionalized group quarters, and 1.5% were institutionalized.

There were 25,002 households, of which 28.2% had children under the age of 18. Of all households, 41.2% were married-couple households, 8.5% were cohabiting couple households, 31.0% had a female householder with no spouse or partner present, and 19.2% had a male householder with no spouse or partner present. About 29.3% of households were one person, and 11.8% were one person aged 65 or older. The average household size was 2.4. There were 15,118 families (60.5% of all households).

The age distribution was 19.2% under the age of 18, 8.1% aged 18 to 24, 31.9% aged 25 to 44, 24.0% aged 45 to 64, and 16.8% aged 65 or older. The median age was 38.3 years. For every 100 females, there were 91.7 males, and for every 100 females age 18 and over, there were 88.5 males age 18 and over.

There were 26,063 housing units at an average density of 2,866.9 units per square mile (1,106.9 units/km^{2}), of which 25,002 (95.9%) were occupied. Of the occupied units, 44.9% were owner-occupied and 55.1% were occupied by renters. Of all housing units, 4.1% were vacant; the homeowner vacancy rate was 0.8% and the rental vacancy rate was 4.1%.

=== 2023 ACS 5-year estimates ===
In 2023, the US Census Bureau estimated that 14.2% of the population were foreign-born. Of all people aged 5 or older, 74.9% spoke only English at home, 14.4% spoke Spanish, 3.8% spoke other Indo-European languages, 4.5% spoke Asian or Pacific Islander languages, and 2.4% spoke other languages. Of those aged 25 or older, 94.2% were high school graduates and 38.4% had a bachelor's degree.

The median household income in 2023 was $84,337, and the per capita income was $46,783. About 7.2% of families and 11.7% of the population were below the poverty line.

=== 2010 census ===
At the 2010 census La Mesa had a population of 57,065. The population density was 6,259.6 inhabitants per square mile (2,416.8/km^{2}). The racial makeup of La Mesa was 54.1% White, 21.5% Hispanic or Latino of any race, 8.0% African American, 5.8% Asian, 0.8% Native American, 0.6% Pacific Islander, 11.6% from other races, and 5.8% from two or more races.

The census reported that 56,408 people (98.8% of the population) lived in households, 124 (0.2%) lived in non-institutionalized group quarters, and 533 (0.9%) were institutionalized.

There were 24,512 households, 6,695 (27.3%) had children under the age of 18 living in them, 9,330 (38.1%) were opposite-sex married couples living together, 3,102 (12.7%) had a female householder with no husband present, 1,335 (5.4%) had a male householder with no wife present. There were 1,731 (7.1%) unmarried opposite-sex partnerships, and 243 (1.0%) same-sex married couples or partnerships. 8,004 households (32.7%) were one person and 2,924 (11.9%) had someone living alone who was 65 or older. The average household size was 2.30. There were 13,767 families (56.2% of households); the average family size was 2.94.

The age distribution was 11,164 people (19.6%) under the age of 18, 6,396 people (11.2%) aged 18 to 24, 16,792 people (29.4%) aged 25 to 44, 14,625 people (25.6%) aged 45 to 64, and 8,088 people (14.2%) who were 65 or older. The median age was 37.1 years. For every 100 females, there were 90.8 males. For every 100 females age 18 and over, there were 88.1 males.

There were 26,167 housing units at an average density of 2,870.3 per square mile, of the occupied units 11,221 (45.8%) were owner-occupied and 13,291 (54.2%) were rented. The homeowner vacancy rate was 1.4%; the rental vacancy rate was 7.2%. 26,713 people (46.8% of the population) lived in owner-occupied housing units and 29,695 people (52.0%) lived in rental housing units.

== Arts and culture ==
=== Silent film history ===
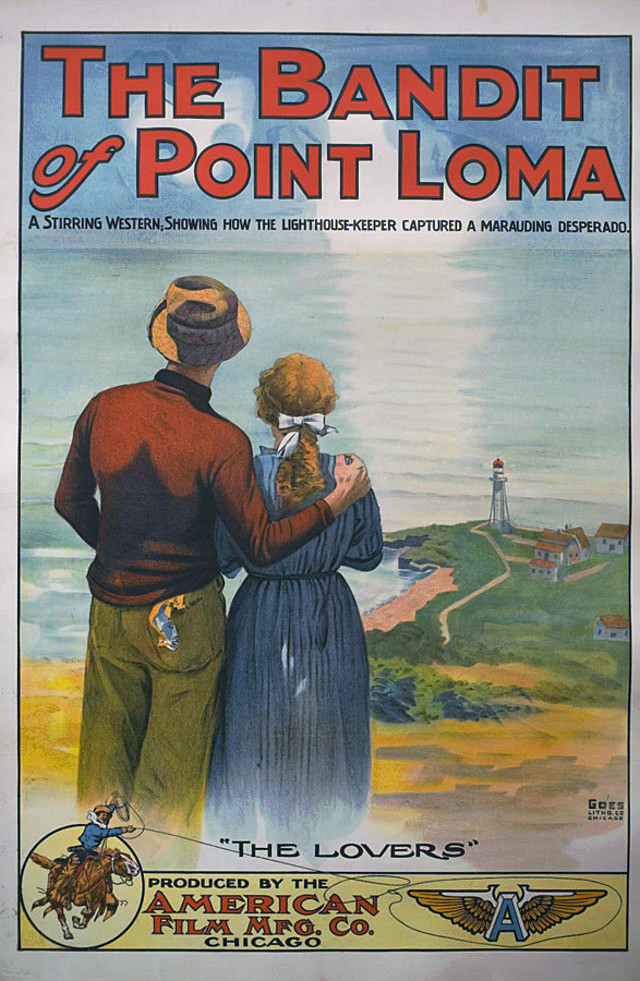
The Bandit of Point Loma (1912)

From 1911 to 1912, film pioneer Allan Dwan kickstarted his career in La Mesa, directing over 150 silent films produced by Flying A Studios. He often used local mentions in the title of his works such as Bonita of El Cajon, Mystical Maid of Jamacha Pass, The Bandit of Point Loma, The Land Baron of San-Tee, and The Winning of La Mesa. After Dwan moved to Los Angeles for the rest of his career, it was reported that La Mesa missed its chance to be "Hollywood before Hollywood."

=== Farmer's market ===
There is a farmer's market in La Mesa Village (along La Mesa Blvd.) every Friday afternoon and evening.

=== Flag Day Parade ===
On June 14, 1997, with the help of Councilmember Ruth Sterling, the City of La Mesa inaugurated its First Annual Flag Day Parade. The parade is now an annual tradition and includes local groups, such as Girl Scouts, Scouting America, and school contingents.

=== La Mesa Walkway of the Stars ===
The “Walkway of the Stars” is a pedestrian walkway that has been transformed into an urban park in downtown La Mesa. The vision for a place to recognize La Mesa's extraordinary volunteers was provided by Councilmember Ruth Sterling. The park's theme honors the city's outstanding volunteers who have provided 10,000 or more hours of service to the city of La Mesa. “Walkway of the Stars” is located between the Allison Avenue municipal parking lot and La Mesa Boulevard. The walkway also features murals by local artists that depict aspects of culture and community in La Mesa.

=== Oktoberfest ===
The annual La Mesa Oktoberfest is a free 3-day community event located in La Mesa village. Oktoberfest is La Mesa’s biggest event of the year; with over 200,000 attendees each year coming to enjoy authentic German-inspired festivities for all ages. From going shopping in the Artisan Alley for handmade goods, to German fare such as bratwurst and schnitzel. The most popular festivities during the Oktoberfest are the free pumpkin patch, pumpkin decorating, maypole dancing, flower crown crafting, and free hat-making. The event is also dog friendly with a dedicated area for pets.

=== Back to the 50s Car Show ===
The Back to the '50s Car Show is an annual summer event where classic car enthusiasts come to display their vehicles. The event is held every Thursday evening during the months of June through August in La Mesa Village along La Mesa Boulevard. Admission to the event is free.

=== Sundays At Six ===
Sundays At Six is a free concert series that is offered every year in the months of June and July. For six Sundays, free concerts are performed in Harry Griffen Park from 6 pm to 7 pm. The concerts began in 2002 after being conceived by then-city councilman Mark Arapostathis and assistant city manager Yvonne Garrett along with members of the community. They are organized by the La Mesa Arts Alliance and sponsored by the Boys & Girls Clubs of East County Foundation.

=== Other events ===
Other annual events include Holiday in the Village, Trick-or-Treating in La Mesa Village, and the raising of the Pride flag at La Mesa City Hall to mark Pride Month each June.

=== Grossmont Center ===
The city's major mall, Grossmont Center, opened by the Cushman Family in 1961. In 2021, Grossmont Center was purchased from the Cushman Family by Federal Realty Trust, which valued the shopping center at $175 Million and plans to redevelop and modernize the 925,000 square-foot property.

=== Alternative media ===
The original offices of The San Diego Door, a popular underground newspaper of the 1960s, were located in La Mesa at 7053 University Avenue.

== Government ==
=== City government ===
La Mesa is a general law city which uses a council-manager system of government with a directly elected mayor. The city council consists of a mayor and four councilmembers, all of whom are elected from the city at large and serve four-year terms. The council meets on the second and fourth Tuesday of each month. The current mayor is Mark Arapostathis, who was re-elected in 2018.

=== State and federal representation ===
In the California State Legislature, La Mesa is in the 39th senatorial district, represented by Democrat Akilah Weber Pierson, and in the 79th Assembly district, represented by Democrat LaShae Sharp-Collins.

In the United States House of Representatives, La Mesa is in California's 51st congressional district, represented by Democrat Sara Jacobs.

== Education ==
The schools in La Mesa are operated by two districts. The La Mesa-Spring Valley School District operates most of the elementary and middle schools in the city, while the Grossmont Union High School District operates Helix High School and the Gateway day schools.

=== Elementary schools ===
- Rolando Elementary School (La Mesa-Spring Valley School District)
- La Mesa Dale Elementary School (La Mesa-Spring Valley School District)
- Maryland Avenue Elementary School (La Mesa-Spring Valley School District)
- RHR DFAF Private Charter School
- Murdock Elementary School (La Mesa-Spring Valley School District)
- Murray Manor Elementary School (La Mesa-Spring Valley School District)
- Northmont Elementary School (La Mesa-Spring Valley School District)
- Lemon Avenue Elementary School (La Mesa-Spring Valley School District)
- Vista La Mesa Academy (Lemon Grove School District)
- Shepherd of the Hills Lutheran School (private, K-8)
- St. Martin's Academy (private)
- Liberty Charter School (private)
- San Diego Jewish Academy (private)
- Christ Lutheran School (private)
- Innovation Center La Mesa – Julian Charter School (charter)

=== Middle/junior high schools ===
- Parkway Sports and Health Sciences Academy (La Mesa-Spring Valley School District)
- La Mesa Arts Academy (6-8 Grade) (LMAAC) (La Mesa-Spring Valley School District)
- Vista La Mesa Academy (Lemon Grove School District)
- Shepherd of the Hills Lutheran School (private, K-8)

=== High schools ===
- Helix High School (Grossmont Union High School District)
- Grossmont High School (Grossmont Union High School District) includes some students from La Mesa while having an El Cajon street address

=== K–12 ===
- Gateway Community Day (Grossmont Union High School District)
- Gateway West Community Day (Grossmont Union High School District)
- Mt. Helix Academy (Private Administration)

== Notable people ==
- Aaron Boone, retired baseball player and manager
- Eileen Bowman, actress
- Reggie Bush, retired football player
- Brian Patrick Butler, actor and filmmaker
- Ammar Campa-Najjar (born 1989), Democratic politician
- Brooks Conrad, baseball player
- Ralph Drollinger, basketball player and religious minister
- Josquin Des Pres, producer and bassist
- Blanket Jackson, filmmaker and son of Michael Jackson
- Joe Kennedy, baseball player born in La Mesa
- Dave Mustaine, founding guitarist/vocalist of Megadeth
- Ellen Ochoa, engineer and astronaut
- Willie O'Ree, hockey player
- Jason Phillips (catcher), former baseball catcher for New York Mets
- Goldie Rapp, third baseman for the Philadelphia Phillies
- Steve Roach, ambient musician
- Claudia Sandoval, MasterChef winner
- Cathy Scott, true-crime author
- Whitney Shay, blues, soul, and rhythm and blues singer and songwriter
- Alex Smith, retired football player who was raised in La Mesa.
- Benjamin Stockham, actor
- Eddie Vedder, vocalist/guitarist of Pearl Jam
- Bill Walton, basketball player and sportscaster

== See also ==
- El Granito Springs
