= Spring Street station (San Diego Trolley) =

San Diego Trolley station

Spring Street
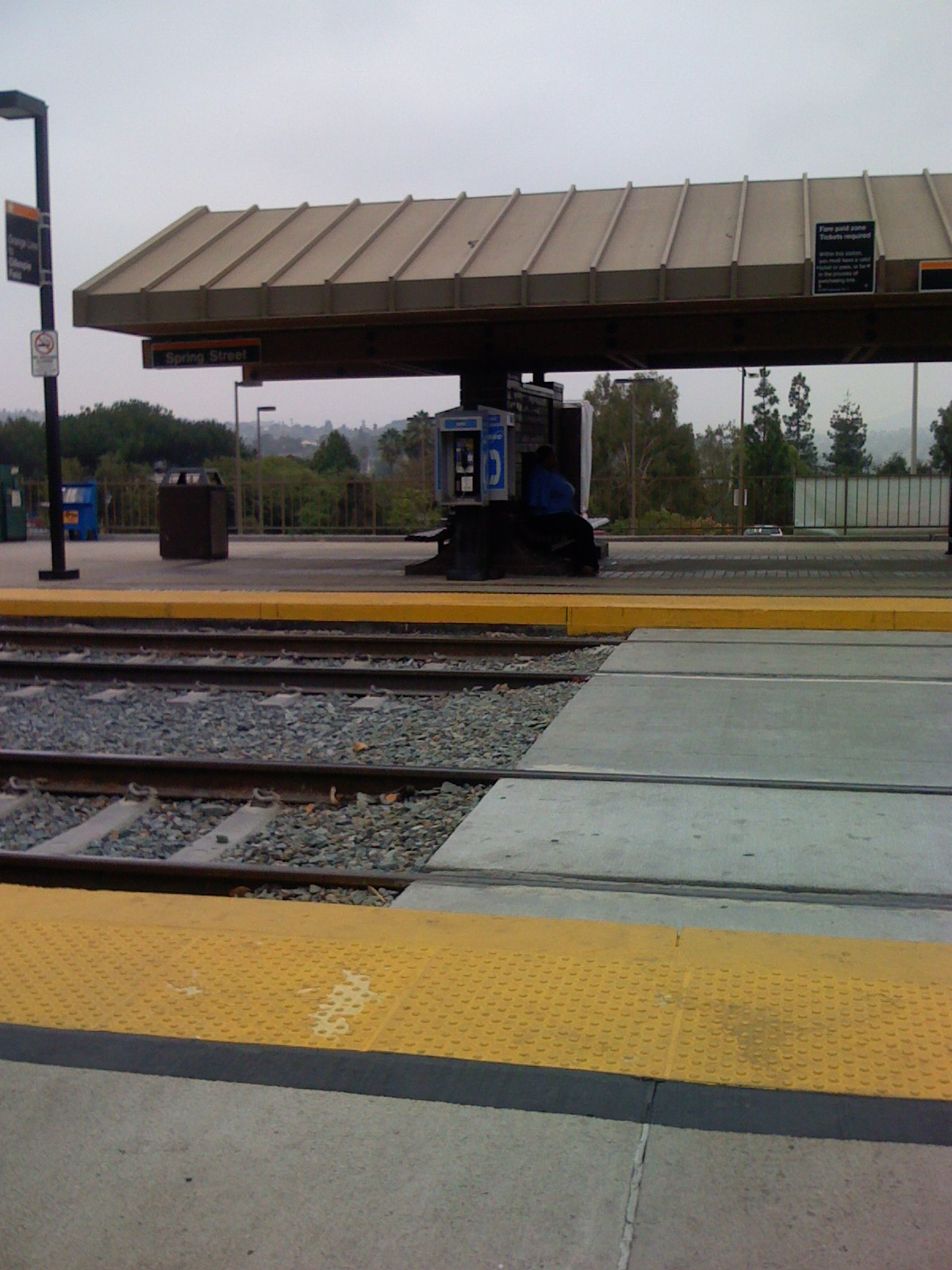
- The platforms in 2008, before station renovations

General information
- Location: 4250 Spring Street; La Mesa, California; United States
- Coordinates: 32°45′25″N 117°1′2″W
- Owner: San Diego Metropolitan Transit System
- Operator: San Diego Trolley
- Line: SD&AE La Mesa Branch
- Platforms: 2 side platforms
- Tracks: 2
- Connections: MTS: 851, 855

Construction
- Structure type: At-grade
- Parking: 324 spaces
- Accessible: Disabled access

Other information
- Station code: 75036, 75037

History
- Opened: May 12, 1989
- Rebuilt: December 2012

Services
| Preceding station | San Diego Trolley | Following station |
|---|---|---|
| Lemon Grove Depot toward Courthouse | Orange Line | La Mesa Boulevard toward El Cajon |
Location

Spring Street station is a station on the Orange Line of the San Diego Trolley. It is located in San Diego suburb of La Mesa, California, and serves both nearby residences and as a commuter park and ride location. It is accessible from both the 94 Freeway and the 125 Freeway along Spring Street to the south of the station.

== History ==
Spring Street was the eastern terminus of the Euclid Line following the opening of the second segment on May 12, 1989. Also later known as the East Line, the line operated from 12th & Imperial and was further extended to El Cajon in June 1989.

This station was renovated from late August through December 2012 as part of the Trolley Renewal Project, although the station remained open during construction.

== See also ==
- List of San Diego Trolley stations
