= East Village, San Diego =

- Neighborhood of San Diego
- East Village
- Location within Central San Diego East Village, San Diego (California) East Village, San Diego (the United States)
- Coordinates: 32°43′27″N 117°10′2″W
- Country: United States of America
- State: California
- County: San Diego
- City: San Diego
- ZIP Code: 92101
- Area code: 619
- Website: eastvillagesandiego.com

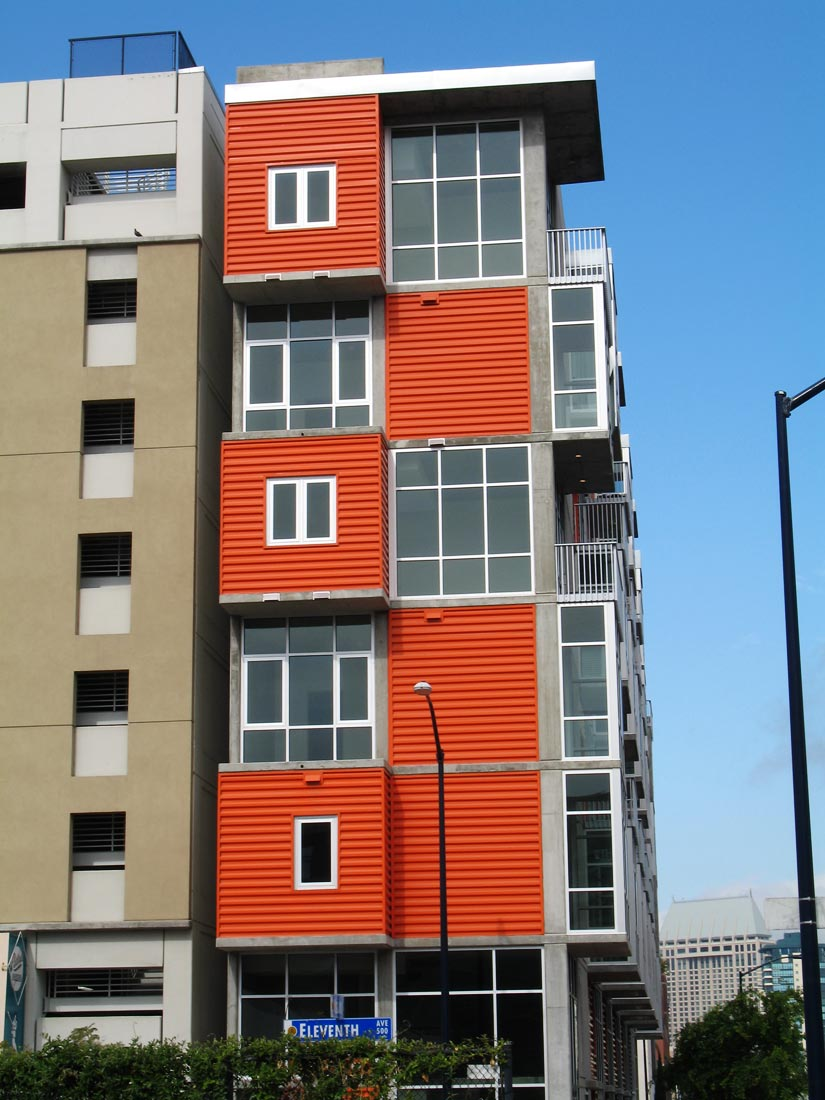
Studio apartments in East Village

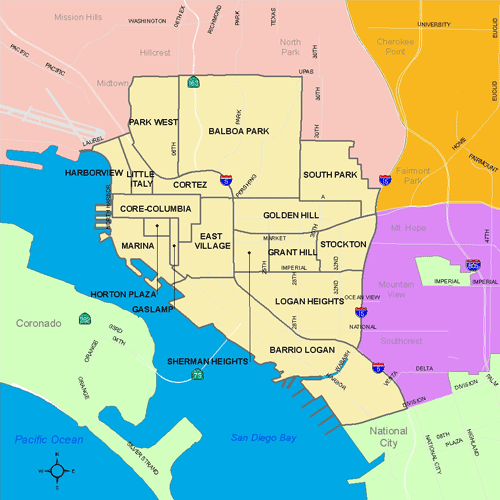
Central portion of San Diego and neighborhood boundaries

East Village is a neighborhood in downtown San Diego, California, United States. It is the largest urban neighborhood in downtown San Diego. It is located east of the Gaslamp Quarter and southeast of the Core district and Cortez Hill in downtown San Diego. East Village encompasses 130 blocks between Seventh Avenue east to 18th Street. It is home to more than 700 businesses.

== History ==
San Diego's East Village was traditionally a series of warehouses and vacant lots. It wasn't until the 1990s that it became a community for artists and social services. Residential aspects of the East Village became a reality in 2005, after Petco Park was established in 2004.

The East Village community now has a population of 40,000 (and growing), with most residents living in mid-rise or luxury condominiums and lofts. Continuing urban development and the steady growth of new businesses draws locals from neighboring downtown areas.

== Urban renewal ==
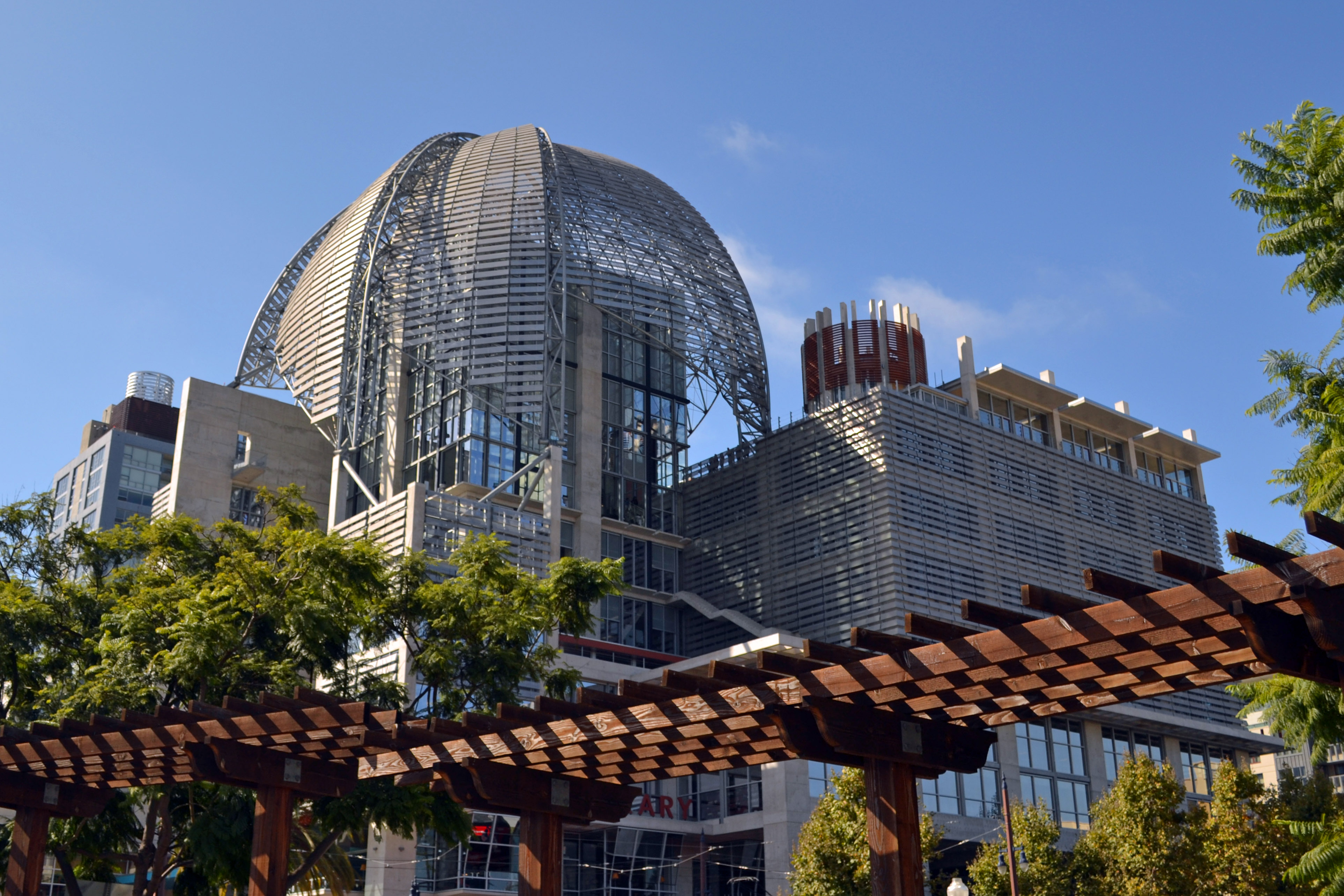
The San Diego Central Library is in the East Village neighborhood

In the latter part of the 20th century the East Village became known for its vacant buildings, dive bars, and eclectic dwellings of artists. Prostitutes, drug addicts, and homeless people were common. The neighborhood rapidly gentrified after the opening of Petco Park in 2004, becoming home to many upscale restaurants and trendy shops. It is still impacted by high rates of homelessness. The neighborhood is now a hub of construction including condominium projects and other public spaces, including the San Diego Central Library. The $185 million project, designed by architect Rob Quigley, officially opened September 30, 2013.

=== I.D.E.A. District ===
In 2011, developers David Malmuth and Pete Garcia, revealed a concept for new, innovative development within East Village with a focus on innovation, design, education, and the arts. These four points would serve as the acronym for this proposed district, the I.D.E.A. District. Within East Village, about 38 city blocks were encompassed within the plan. Planned development for the area included 3 million square feet of office and studio space, 600,000 square feet of commercial retail and restaurants, and 2,200 new apartments. The main focus of the project revolved around innovating and creating new tech jobs for the area while being a cutting-edge urban development for the workforce of tomorrow. The first project in this proposal was known as IDEA1, an apartment complex which opened in 2017 to kickstart the project. Another recent opening within the I.D.E.A. District was in May 2022 with UC San Diego's Park & Market. It will serve as a "social and intellectual hub for civic engagement, learning and collaboration."

=== East Village Quarter ===
Tailgate Park, a city-owned 5.25 acre lot one block away from Petco Park, was sold and cleared for development in a vote by City Council in April 2022. This lot was mostly parking spaces for Petco Park which was just one block east of the area, but the new proposed development, named East Village Quarter, would include: "1,800 apartments, 50,000 square feet of retail and office space and a public park." 270 of those residential units are also going to be reserved for low and middle income San Diego residents. The projected budget for this new development is $1.5 billion.

The new development was originally formulated in September 2020 when a group of developing firms led by the Padres were chosen by city officials to redevelop the area after it was originally put up for sale in December 2019.

This proposed development has been under backlash however, with a lawsuit against the city filed by the advocacy group, Project For Open Government, in May 2022 on the grounds of the deal not following the California Environmental Quality Act, the lot being sold for less than fair-market value, and failing to hold a public hearing of the city planning commission. Hearings have not been scheduled and the case is still ongoing. In late 2026, developers broke ground in the East Village on sustainable affordable housing constructed using mass timber, aimed at lowering per-unit construction costs and reducing building emissions.

== Businesses/landmarks ==
- Petco Park: the home of the San Diego Padres.
- Harbor Drive Pedestrian Bridge: connects to the San Diego Convention Center.
- San Diego Central Library, which opened on 30 September 2013.
- Educational institutions:
  - Fashion Institute of Design and Merchandising
  - San Diego City College.
  - UCSD Downtown Center.
