= 12th & Imperial Transit Center =

San Diego Trolley and bus station

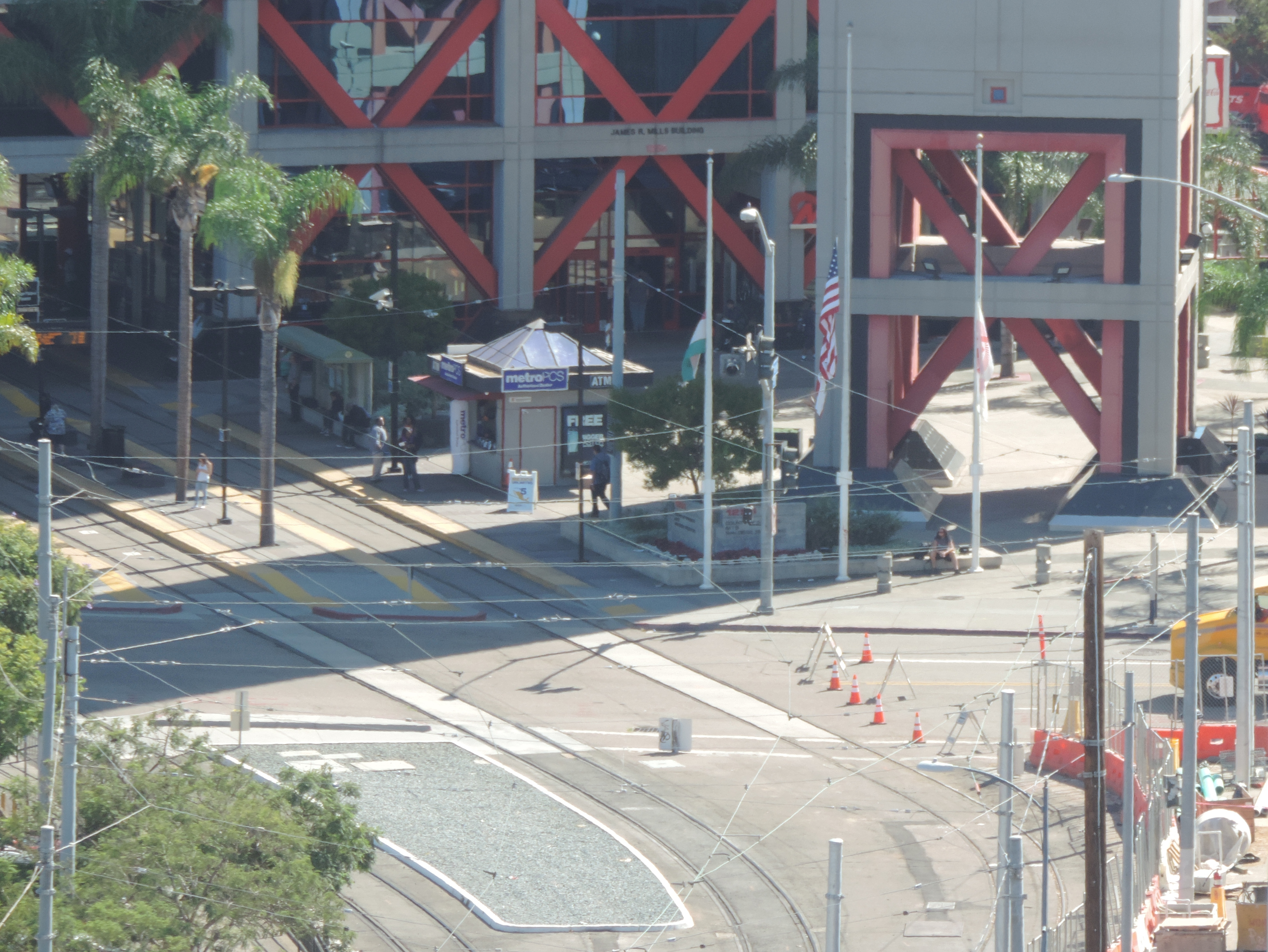
- 12th & Imperial Transit Center in 2016

General information
- Location: 1255 Imperial Avenue; San Diego, California; United States
- Coordinates: 32°42′20″N 117°09′12″W
- Owner: San Diego Metropolitan Transit System
- Operator: San Diego Trolley
- Platforms: 2 island platforms 3 side platforms
- Tracks: 4
- Connections: MTS: 4, 12, 901, 910 (Overnight Express), 929; FlixBus; Greyhound Lines

Construction
- Structure type: At-grade
- Parking: 1,020 spaces, paid
- Cycle facilities: 8 rack spaces, 2 lockers
- Accessible: Disabled access

Other information
- Station code: 75100, 75102, 75103

History
- Opened: July 26, 1981
- Rebuilt: 2013

Services
Preceding station	San Diego Trolley	Following station
Main building
Park & Market toward UTC	Blue Line	Barrio Logan toward San Ysidro
Park & Market toward Courthouse	Orange Line	25th & Commercial toward El Cajon
Park & Market One-way operation	Silver Line	Gaslamp Quarter Next clockwise
Bayside terminal
Terminus	Green Line	Gaslamp Quarter toward El Cajon
Terminus	Special Event Line	Gaslamp Quarter toward Balboa Avenue
Former services
Preceding station	San Diego Trolley	Following station
Park & Market toward 12th & Imperial	Orange Line 2005-2012	25th & Commercial toward Gillespie Field
Terminus	Orange Line 2005-2012	Gaslamp Quarter toward Gillespie Field
Terminus	Special Event Line pre-2012	Gaslamp Quarter toward Qualcomm Stadium
Track layout
Main building
Bayside terminal
Key
Location

12th & Imperial Transit Center is a San Diego Trolley station in downtown San Diego, California. It is on the ground floor of the James R. Mills Building, an office tower located directly south of the intersection of 12th and Imperial Avenues in the East Village neighborhood of the city. It also serves the high-density residential developments that surround the stop, and is one of two stations from which Petco Park can be reached (the other being Gaslamp Quarter station). The station has historically been used as a major transfer point between the various trolley lines and is the only station that is directly served by all major lines.

== Service ==
=== San Diego Trolley ===
The Blue Line and the Orange Line are served by the station's island transfer platforms, and the two lines split just south of this station to serve South Bay and East County, respectively. To the north, both lines run parallel to each other through downtown on Park Boulevard and turn west at City College to run along C Street towards UTC Transit Center and Courthouse station, respectively. The Silver Line uses the platform directly adjacent to the 1255 Imperial Avenue building, as the start of its clockwise circular route around downtown San Diego.

The Bayside Terminal platform of the 12th & Imperial station marks the western terminus of the Green Line, which, upon departing from the station, goes through Gaslamp Quarter, Convention Center and Seaport Village stations to Santa Fe Depot, then on to Old Town Transit Center and its destination at Santee Town Center station.

This station was renovated in two stages during the Trolley Renewal Project: in summer 2011 for the Bayside Terminal platform, and from late October 2012 until June 2013 for the main station platforms.

Prior to September 2, 2012, Orange Line trolleys used to loop around downtown San Diego to terminate at the Bayside Terminal platform of this station until a system redesign rerouted the western terminus of the line to Santa Fe Depot and extended the Green Line's terminus from Old Town Transit Center to the Bayside Terminal.

=== Bus service ===
San Diego MTS bus routes 4, 12, 901, and 929 also stop at the 12th & Imperial Transit Center. The bus bays are located to the east of the northbound Blue/Orange line transfer platform, on the west side of National Avenue.

== Location ==
The 12th & Imperial Transit Center is built into the James R. Mills Building, a 10-story office tower that houses the headquarters of the San Diego Metropolitan Transit System and is located directly adjacent to the San Diego Trolley maintenance yard.

It is also located approximately two blocks east of Petco Park and just south of the San Diego Central Library.

== See also ==
- List of San Diego Trolley stations
