= Courthouse station (San Diego Trolley) =

San Diego Trolley station

Courthouse
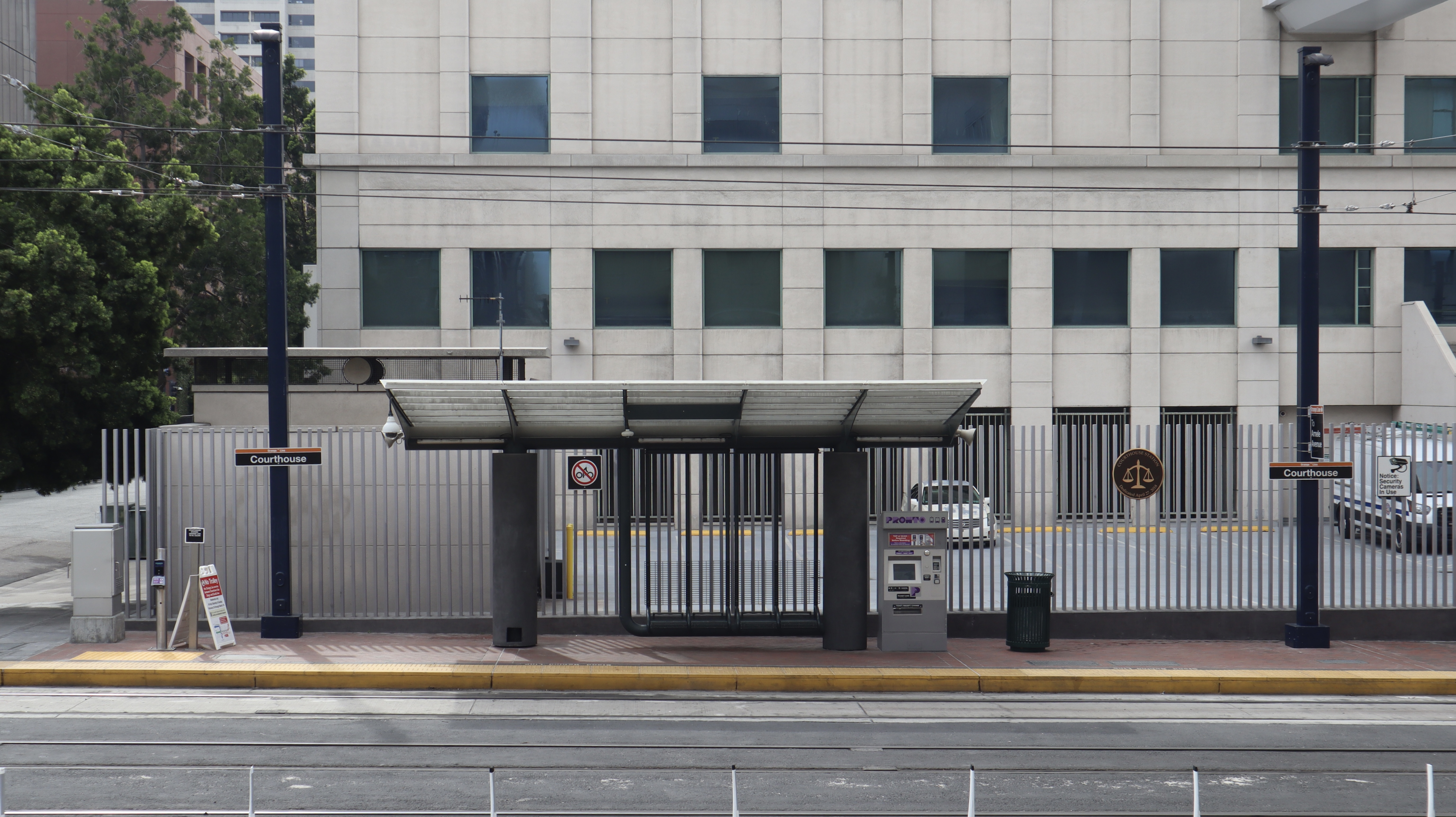
- Courthouse station, 2024

General information
- Location: 330 West C Street; San Diego, California; United States
- Coordinates: 32°43′00″N 117°09′58″W
- Owner: San Diego Metropolitan Transit System
- Operator: San Diego Trolley
- Platforms: 1 side platform
- Tracks: 1

Construction
- Structure type: At-grade
- Accessible: Disabled access

Other information
- Station code: 75019

History
- Opened: April 29, 2018

Services
Preceding station	San Diego Trolley	Following station
Terminus	Orange Line (except late-night service)	Civic Center toward El Cajon
Blue Line does not stop here
Silver Line does not stop here
Track layout
Key
Location

Courthouse station is a light rail station in San Diego, California. It is the western terminus of the San Diego Trolley's Orange Line and is located between the Hall of Justice and San Diego Central Courthouse in downtown San Diego, on C Street between State and Union streets. The station opened on April 29, 2018, after nearly a year of construction.

== History ==
As the San Diego Metropolitan Transit System (MTS) wrapped up its Trolley Renewal Project, the transit agency embarked on a realignment of the trolley lines in downtown San Diego. With three trolley lines now sharing the tracks in the area, problems quickly popped up. At the beginning of the realignment in September 2012, Orange Line trains terminated at Santa Fe Depot, sharing the same track as the southbound Green Line. In June 2017, the Orange Line terminus was moved to America Plaza, the northern terminus of the Blue Line, forcing complicated switching procedures that often delayed trains on both lines as they entered or exited the station. MTS feared that the extension of the Blue Line to UCSD would only compound issues in the area.

The solution proposed by the MTS was a dedicated western terminus for the Orange Line to serve as a convenient layover for Orange Line trains. The transit agency chose to build the station three blocks east of America Plaza, between the Hall of Justice and San Diego Central Courthouse, which at the time was about to begin construction. Top court officials and San Diego County Sheriff Bill Gore opposed the station, saying that it would jeopardize the safety and security of the courthouse. In response, MTS did make some changes to the station design, including adding a fence to separate the station from a court parking lot and feeding the station's security cameras into the courthouse security system.

MTS received a $31.9 million grant from the state government's cap and trade program in 2015 to fund the Courthouse station project and a vehicle replacement program. Construction on the station began in August 2017, requiring multiple weekend shutdowns of the Orange Line. After nearly a year of construction, Courthouse station was dedicated by local officials on April 27, 2018, and opened to passengers on April 29.

== Station layout ==
Most Orange Line trains reach Courthouse station using a single siding track and passengers board and alight using a single side platform, while Orange Line late-night service, Blue, and Silver line trains bypass the station on the two main tracks.
