= Rio Vista station =

San Diego Trolley station

Rio Vista
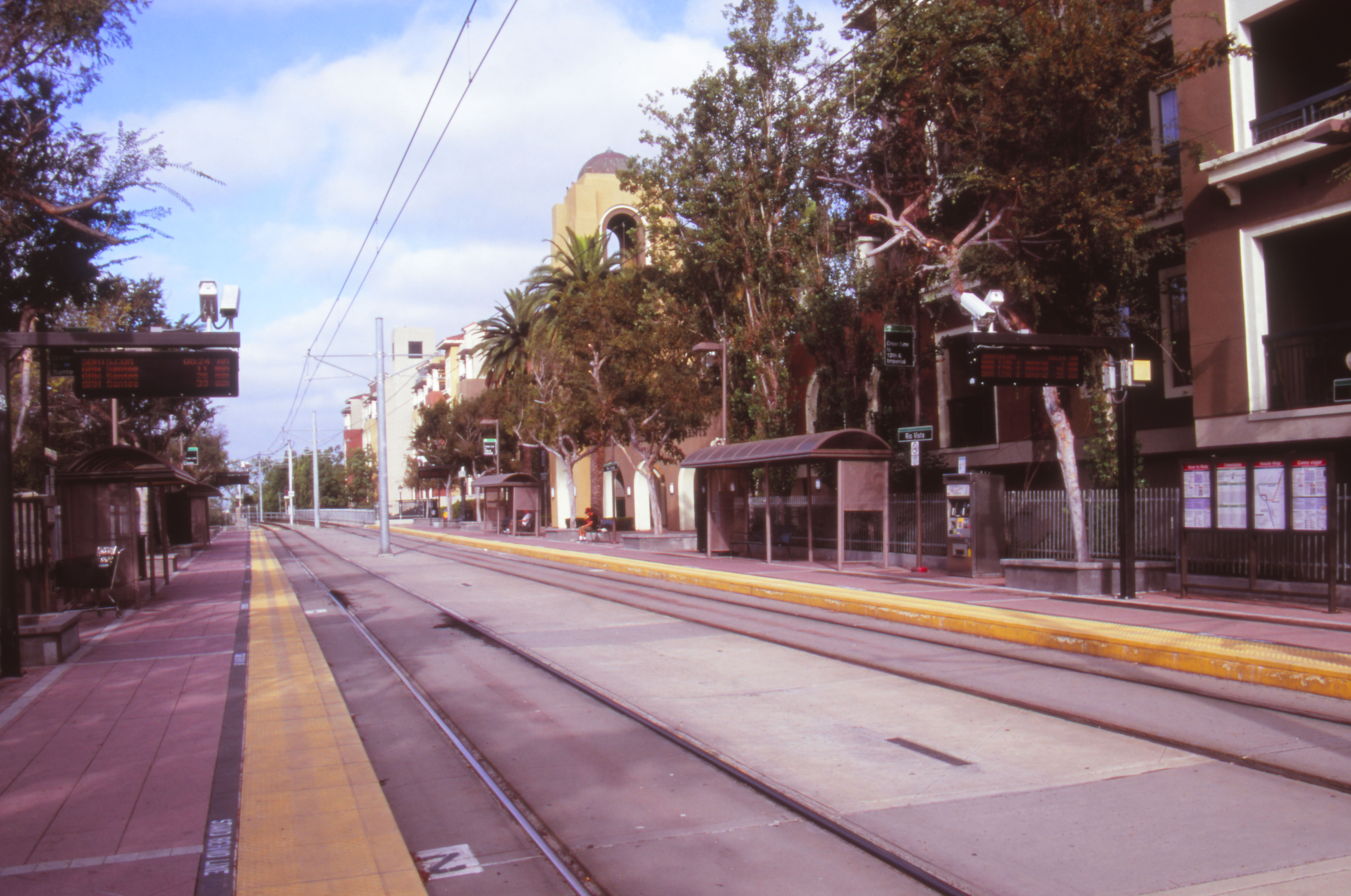
- Rio Vista trolley station

General information
- Location: 2020 Qualcomm Way; San Diego, California; United States
- Coordinates: 32°46′25″N 117°8′28″W
- Owner: San Diego Metropolitan Transit System
- Operator: San Diego Trolley
- Platforms: 2 side platforms
- Tracks: 2

Construction
- Structure type: At-grade
- Accessible: Disabled access

History
- Opened: November 23, 1997
- Rebuilt: 2005

Services
Preceding station	San Diego Trolley	Following station
Mission Valley Center toward 12th & Imperial	Green Line	Fenton Parkway toward El Cajon
Former services
Preceding station	San Diego Trolley	Following station
Mission Valley Center toward San Ysidro	Blue Line 1997-2005	Fenton Parkway toward Mission San Diego
Mission Valley Center toward 12th & Imperial	Special Event Line pre-2012	Fenton Parkway toward Qualcomm Stadium
Location

Rio Vista station is a station on the San Diego Trolley's Green Line. The street-level station has side platforms. It is located near Qualcomm Way and the San Diego River. The station is a part of the Rio Vista development, which includes apartments and office parks in the Mission Valley East neighborhood.

Before July 2005, this station was served by the Blue Line until service between Old Town Transit Center and Mission San Diego was replaced by the Green Line upon its introduction in conjunction with the opening of the Mission Valley East extension.

== See also ==
- List of San Diego Trolley stations
