= Mission Valley Center station =

San Diego Trolley station

Mission Valley Center
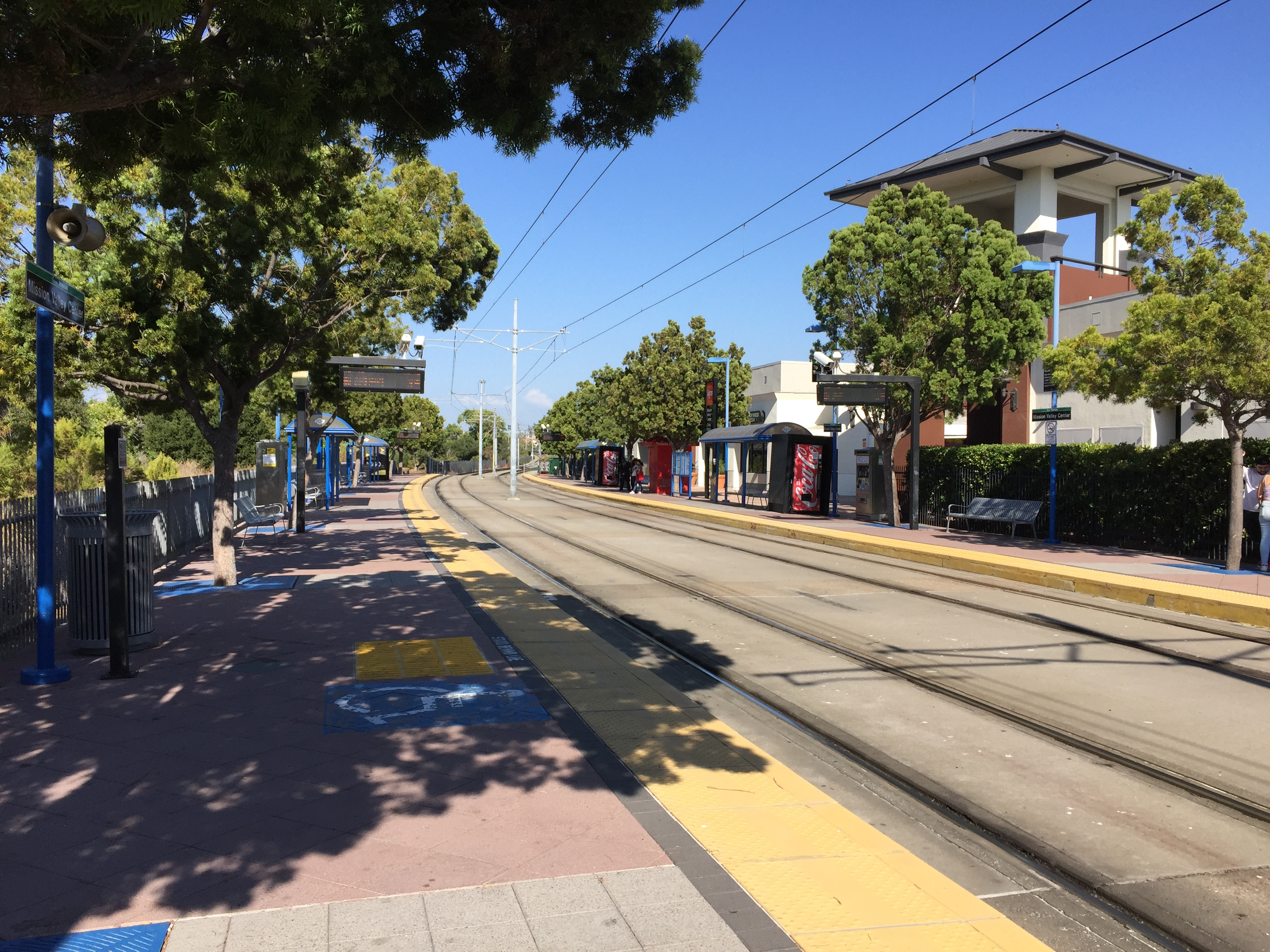
- Mission Valley Center station in 2019

General information
- Location: 1604 Camino de la Reina; San Diego, California; United States
- Coordinates: 32°46′16″N 117°8′58″W
- Owner: San Diego Metropolitan Transit System
- Operator: San Diego Trolley
- Platforms: 2 side platforms
- Tracks: 2
- Connections: MTS: 6

Construction
- Structure type: At-grade
- Accessible: Disabled access

History
- Opened: November 23, 1997
- Rebuilt: 2005

Services
Preceding station	San Diego Trolley	Following station
Hazard Center toward 12th & Imperial	Green Line	Rio Vista toward El Cajon
Former services
Preceding station	San Diego Trolley	Following station
Hazard Center toward San Ysidro	Blue Line 1997-2005	Rio Vista toward Mission San Diego
Hazard Center toward 12th & Imperial	Special Event Line pre-2012	Rio Vista toward Qualcomm Stadium
Location

Mission Valley Center station is a station on San Diego Trolley's Green Line. The street-level station has side platforms. It is located near Camino De La Reina between Mission Center Road and Camino Del Este. The station is located next to the Mission Valley mall and serves a massive commercial corridor in the Mission Valley East neighborhood.

Prior to July 2005, this station was served by the Blue Line until service between Old Town Transit Center and Mission San Diego was replaced by the Green Line upon its introduction in conjunction with the opening of the Mission Valley East extension.

== See also ==
- List of San Diego Trolley stations
