= Hazard Center station =

San Diego Trolley station

Hazard Center
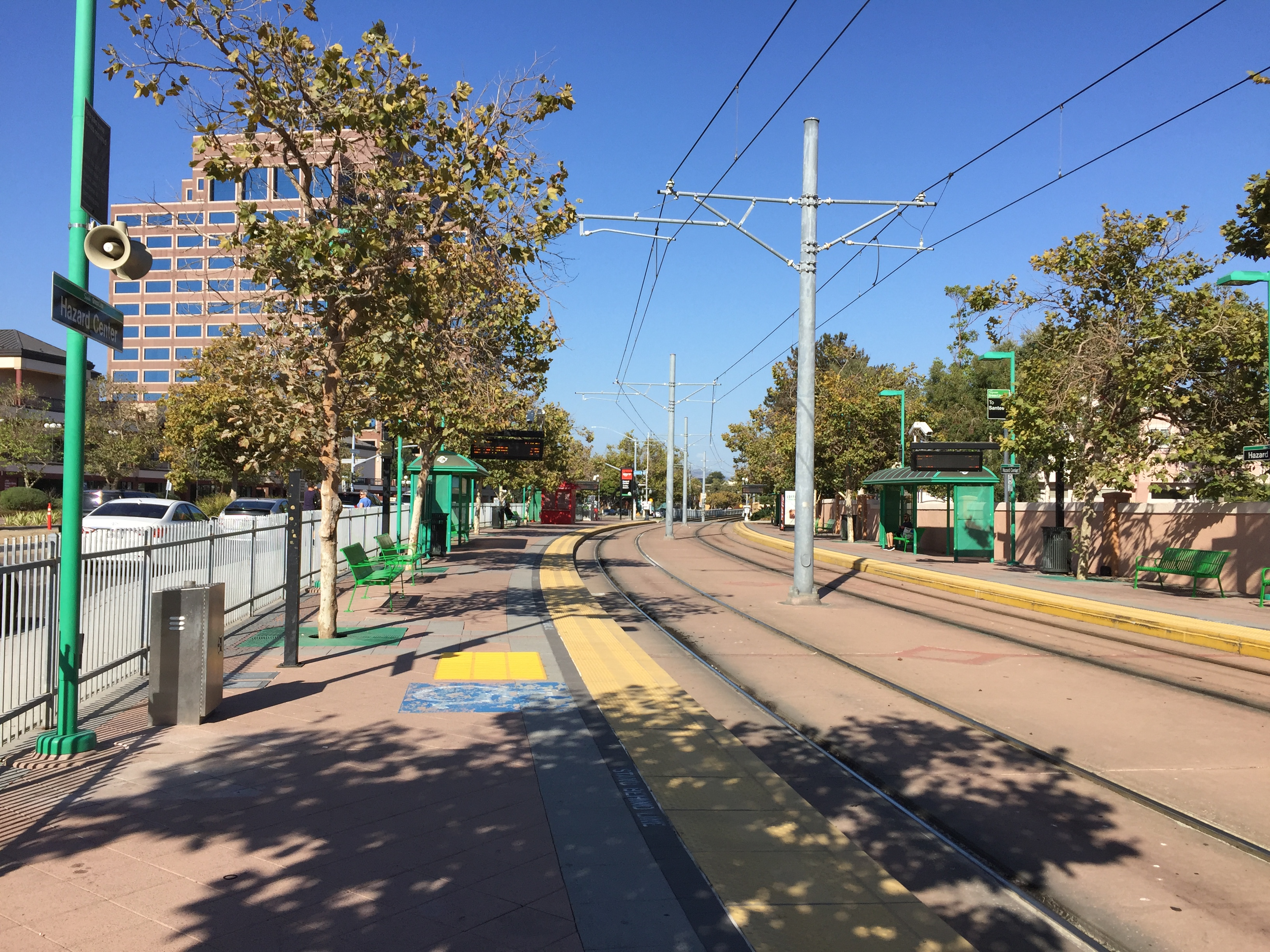
- Hazard Center station in 2019

General information
- Location: 7611 Hazard Center Drive; San Diego, California; United States
- Coordinates: 32°46′13″N 117°9′29″W
- Owner: San Diego Metropolitan Transit System
- Operator: San Diego Trolley
- Platforms: 2 side platforms
- Tracks: 2

Construction
- Structure type: At-grade
- Cycle facilities: 4 rack spaces, 1 locker
- Accessible: Disabled access

History
- Opened: November 23, 1997
- Rebuilt: 2005

Services
Preceding station	San Diego Trolley	Following station
Fashion Valley toward 12th & Imperial	Green Line	Mission Valley Center toward El Cajon
Former services
Preceding station	San Diego Trolley	Following station
Fashion Valley toward San Ysidro	Blue Line 1997-2005	Mission Valley Center toward Mission San Diego
Fashion Valley toward 12th & Imperial	Special Event Line pre-2012	Mission Valley Center toward Qualcomm Stadium
Location

Hazard Center station is a station on San Diego Trolley's Green Line. The street-level station has side platforms. It is located near the intersection of Hazard Center Drive at Frazee Road. The station is located across the street from the Hazard Center development. This stop is located in the densely populated Mission Valley West neighborhood.

Prior to July 2005, this station was served by the Blue Line until service between Old Town Transit Center and Mission San Diego was replaced by the Green Line upon its introduction in conjunction with the opening of the Mission Valley East extension.

== See also ==
- List of San Diego Trolley stations
