= Mission Valley, San Diego =

- Community of San Diego
- Mission Valley
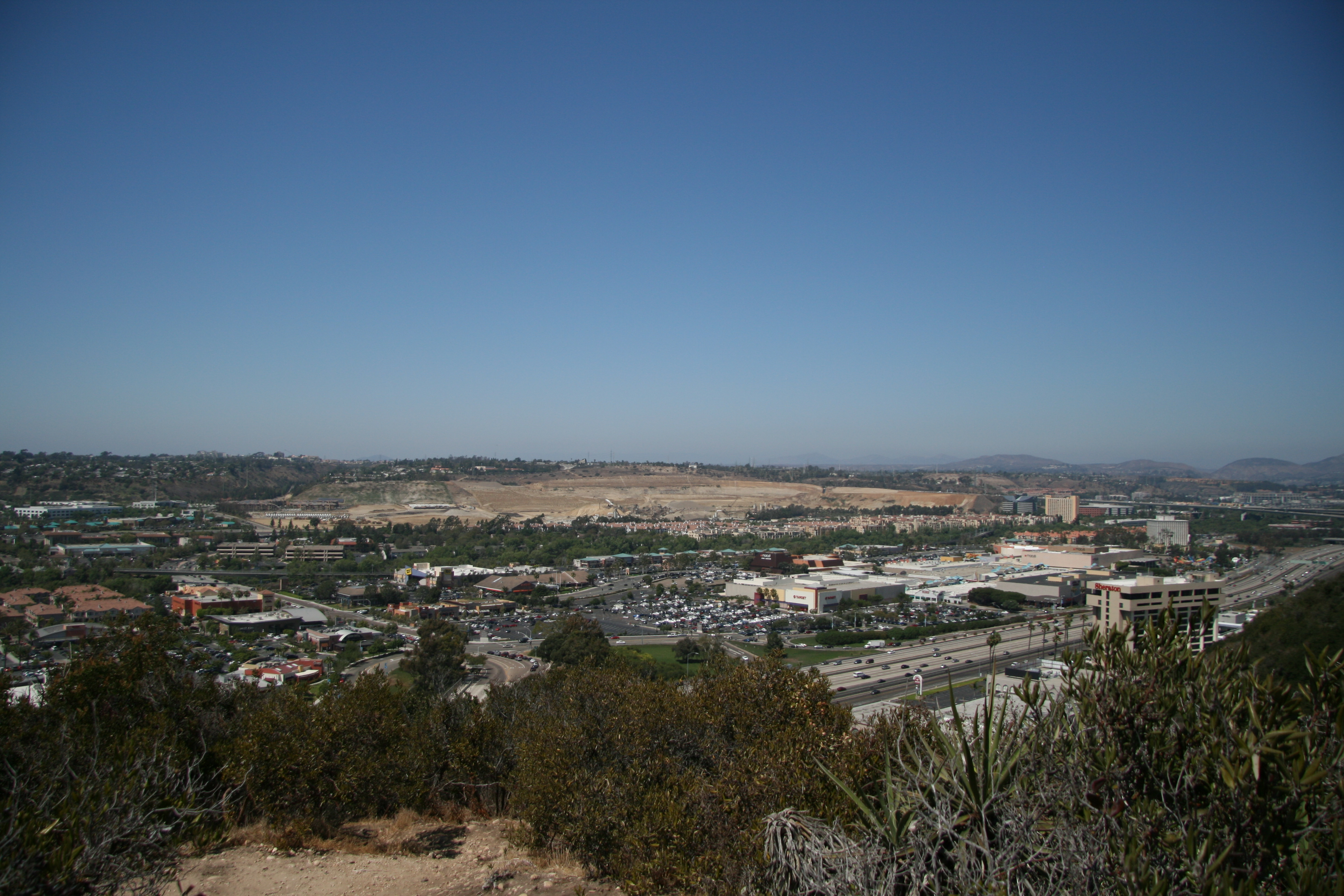
- Central Mission Valley viewed from University Heights Park

- Location within Central San Diego Mission Valley, San Diego (California) Mission Valley, San Diego (the United States)
- Coordinates: 32.7672613°N 117.1496170°W
- Country: United States
- State: California
- County: San Diego
- City: San Diego

Mission Valley is a wide river valley trending east–west in San Diego, California, United States, through which the San Diego River flows to the Pacific Ocean. For planning purposes the City of San Diego divides it into two neighborhoods: Mission Valley East and Mission Valley West.

Mission Valley was the site of the first Spanish settlement in California, established in 1769. The area currently serves as an important shopping and entertainment center for San Diego. Several condominiums and apartments can also be found in the area.

== History ==
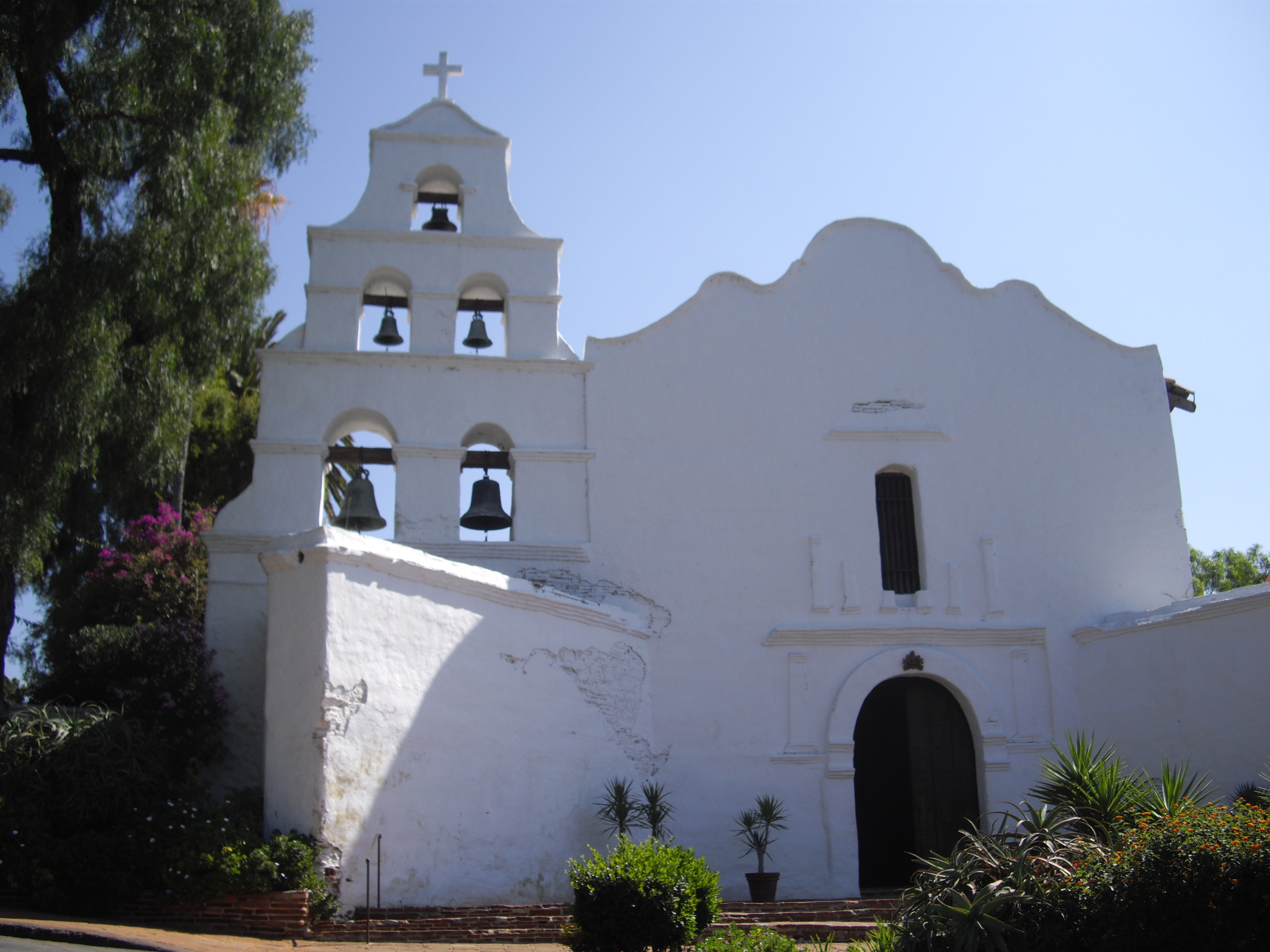
Mission San Diego de Alcalá

The San Diego River valley was originally called Emat Kuseyaay, which was then named by the Spanish as La Cañada de San Diego. Cañada in Spanish means gully, ravine, or glen. The name was changed to Mission Valley in the 1860s in reference to Mission San Diego de Alcalá.

The Mission Valley area was inhabited by Kumeyaay Indians for more than 10,000 years, which was home to many Kumeyaay villages such as the villages of Nipaquay (Nipawai), Haiir, and Cosoy (Kosa'aay).

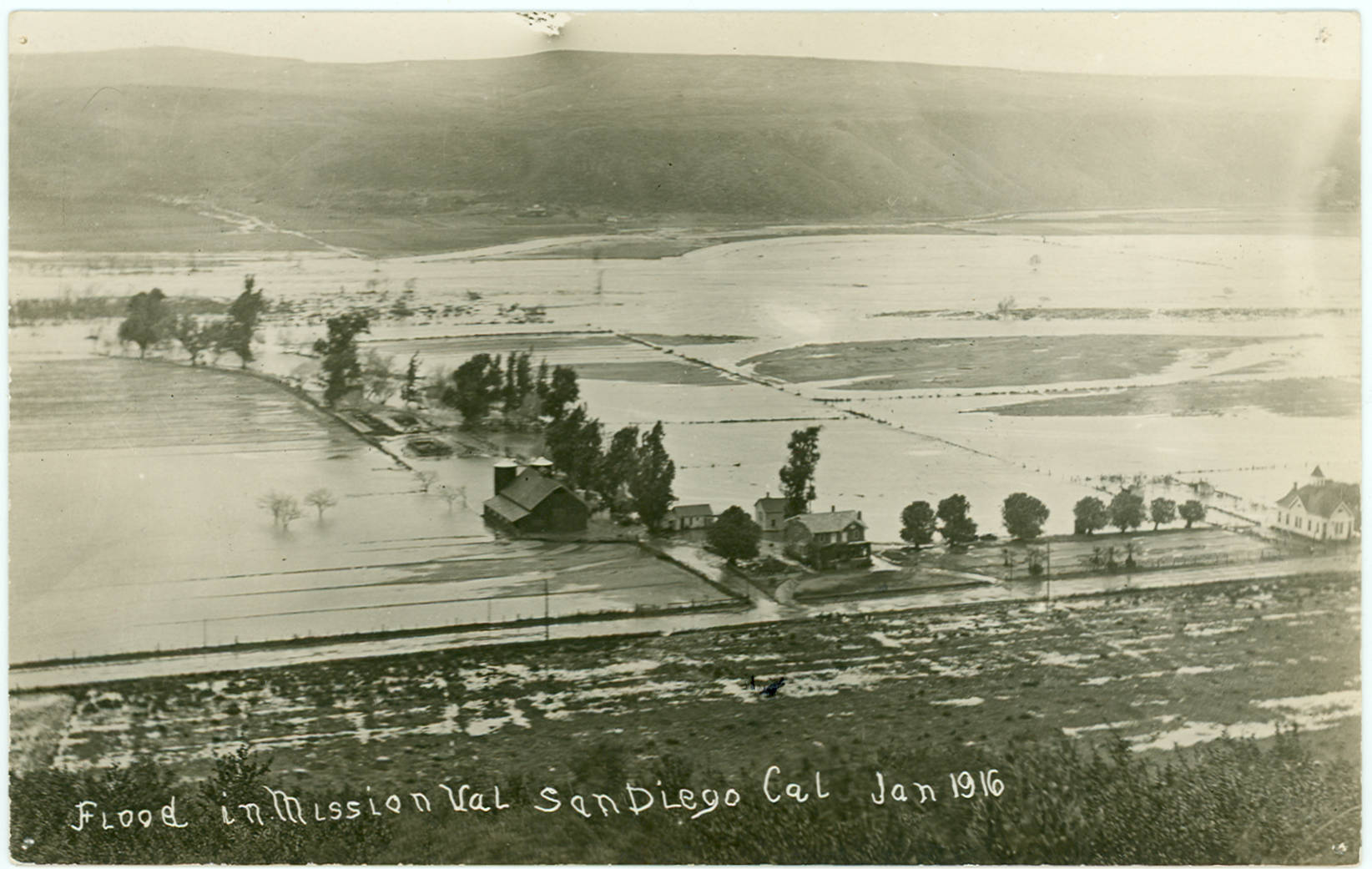
1916 Flood in Mission Valley

The first Spanish settlement in present-day California was the Presidio of San Diego and Mission San Diego de Alcalá, both established in 1769 next to the village of Cosoy. The Presidio and Mission were located at the western end of Mission Valley, which is now present-day Old Town, where the valley opens out into the flood plain of the San Diego River. In 1774, the Mission was moved to its present location at the eastern end of Mission Valley because of better access to freshwater for drinking and farming.

Until the 1940s, Mission Valley remained largely undeveloped, featuring dairy farms and other agricultural activities; the city of San Diego was largely confined to areas south of the valley. After World War II, the city's expansion began to encroach on the valley. The last of the valley's dairy farms closed in the early 1960s.

Another early activity in Mission Valley was quarrying sand and gravel from its walls. A large quarry on the north side of the valley was in operation for most of the 20th century. The quarry ceased operation around 2000 and is now the site of the Civita mixed-use development.

The development of Mission Valley began in 1953 when the first hotel was built in what is now Hotel Circle. In 1958, the city council rezoned 90 acres (36 ha) of the river valley to allow the construction of San Diego's first regional shopping center. The Mission Valley Center (now Westfield Mission Valley) opened in 1961 and was followed by several other large regional shopping malls.

In the late 1950s and early 1960s, the U.S. 80 freeway (now Interstate 8) was constructed through Mission Valley, further opening the area up for development.

Westgate Park, a baseball stadium for the then-minor-league San Diego Padres, was built in Mission Valley in 1957. In 1967, San Diego Stadium (later renamed Jack Murphy Stadium, then Qualcomm Stadium, then SDCCU Stadium) was opened and the Padres moved there, becoming a major league team the following year. Westgate Park was razed in 1969 and was replaced by the Fashion Valley Mall. San Diego Stadium was demolished in 2021 and was replaced by Snapdragon Stadium in 2022.

== Boundaries ==
Mission Valley stretches as far west as Interstate 5 and as far east as Interstate 15. The exact boundary between Mission Valley East and West is State Route 163.

== Government ==
Mission Valley is located in City Council District 7 and is currently represented by Councilmember Raul Campillo. For federal representation, it is divided between California's 52nd congressional district, represented by Scott Peters, and California's 53rd congressional district, represented by Sara Jacobs.

== Transportation ==
Mission Valley serves as a path for Interstate 8 and is crossed at its mouth by Interstate 5. Both I-8 and I-5 serve as the major east–west and north–south routes respectively, for San Diego. At the Jack Schrade Interchange, Interstate 805 crosses Mission Valley and connects with Interstate 8. Interstate 15 and State Route 163 also cross Mission Valley and connect with Interstate 8.

The Green Line of the San Diego Trolley system also runs through Mission Valley. The main hub for buses is located at the Fashion Valley Transit Center and Mall. Other trolley stations in the valley are found at Morena/Linda Vista, Hazard Center, Mission Valley Center, Rio Vista, Fenton Parkway, and Stadium.

== Attractions ==
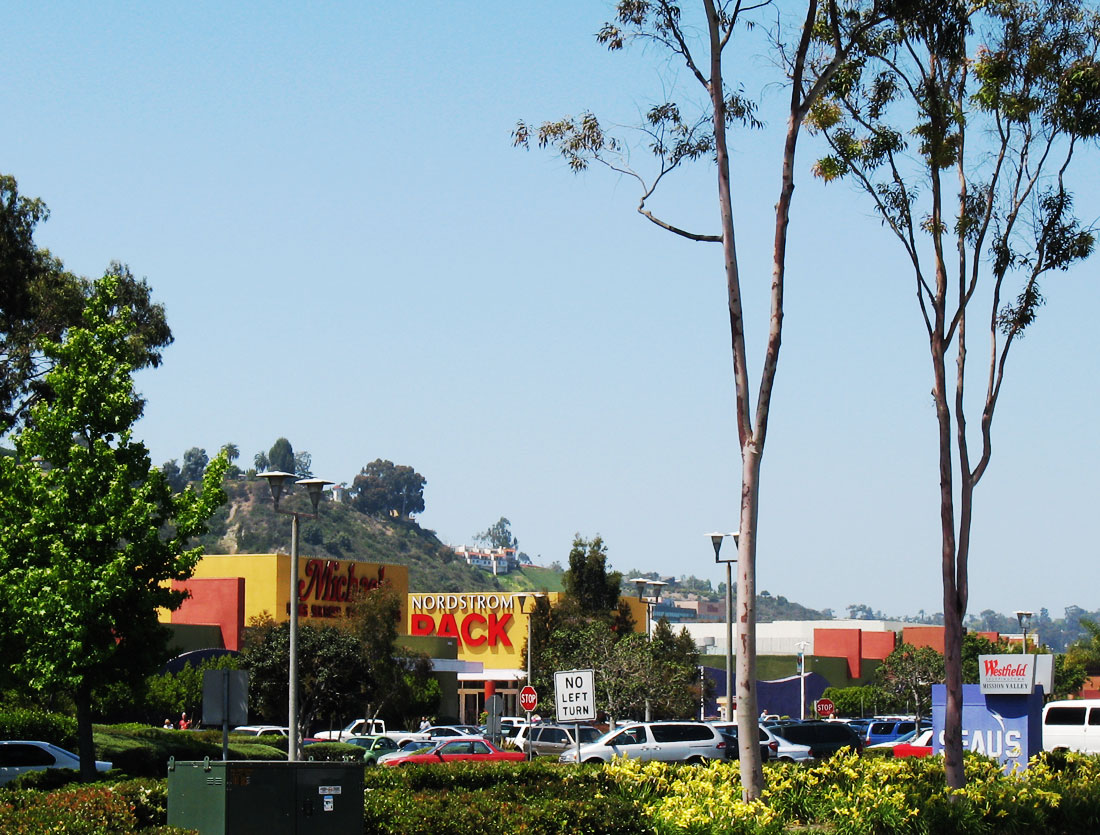
Westfield Mission Valley, one of several large regional shopping centers in Mission Valley

Toward the eastern end of Mission Valley lies Mission San Diego de Alcalá, for which the valley is named. At the southwestern end overlooking the valley is Presidio Park. At the foot of Presidio Hill lies Old Town San Diego State Historic Park, the original site of the town of San Diego. All three attractions are listed on the National Register of Historic Places.

Three major shopping malls located in Mission Valley are Fashion Valley Mall, Hazard Center Mall, and Westfield Mission Valley. During the Halloween season, The Haunted Hotel Disturbance has been located in the Westfield mall parking area near Target since 2019.

Many other commercial developments can be found in the region as well, including smaller shopping plazas, auto malls, and vocational schools. The frontage roads parallel to Interstate 8 west of Highway 163 are named Hotel Circle North and Hotel Circle South, for the many hotels and motels located on them. The frontage roads east of Highway 163 are called Camino del Rio North and Camino del Rio South.

Recently built Snapdragon Stadium is in Mission Valley East near the I-8/I-15 interchange. At the outlet of Mission Valley lie SeaWorld, Mission Bay, and other San Diego attractions.
