= Fenton Parkway station =

San Diego Trolley station

Fenton Parkway
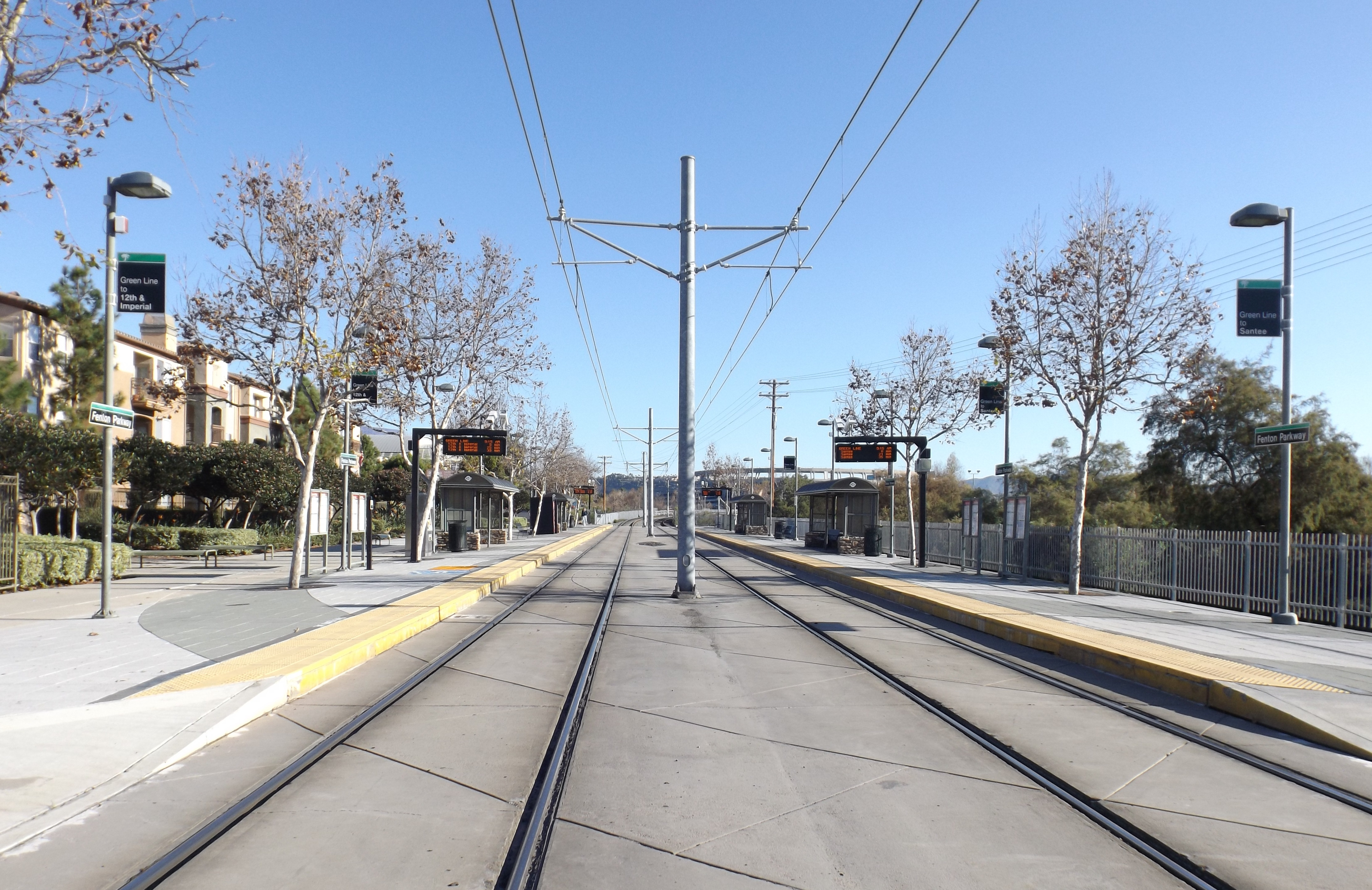

General information
- Location: 2000 Fenton Parkway; San Diego, California 92108
- Coordinates: 32.7785°N 117.1271°W
- Platforms: 2 side platforms

Construction
- Structure type: At-grade
- Parking: Limited street parking
- Accessible: Yes

History
- Opened: September 19, 2000
- Rebuilt: 2005

Services
Preceding station	San Diego Trolley	Following station
Rio Vista toward 12th & Imperial	Green Line	Stadium toward El Cajon
Former services
Preceding station	San Diego Trolley	Following station
Rio Vista toward San Ysidro	Blue Line 1997-2005	Qualcomm Stadium toward Mission San Diego
Rio Vista toward 12th & Imperial	Special Event Line pre-2012	Qualcomm Stadium Terminus
Location

Fenton Parkway station is an at-grade station on San Diego Trolley's Green Line. This street-level station has side platforms. It is near Fenton Parkway and the San Diego River. The station is near a large apartment complex, several office parks, and Fenton Marketplace in the Mission Valley East neighborhood.

This station opened on September 19, 2000, as an "infill station" (i.e. it was not an original station when the line opened in 1997). As such, Fenton Parkway is the only infill station on the current Green Line and the third in the entire system, following E Street and America Plaza. It was served by the Blue Line until July 2005, when service between Old Town Transit Center and Mission San Diego (and points eastward) were replaced by the Green Line upon its introduction, in conjunction with the opening of the Mission Valley East Trolley extension.

== See also ==
- List of San Diego Trolley stations
