= Fashion Valley Transit Center =

San Diego Trolley station

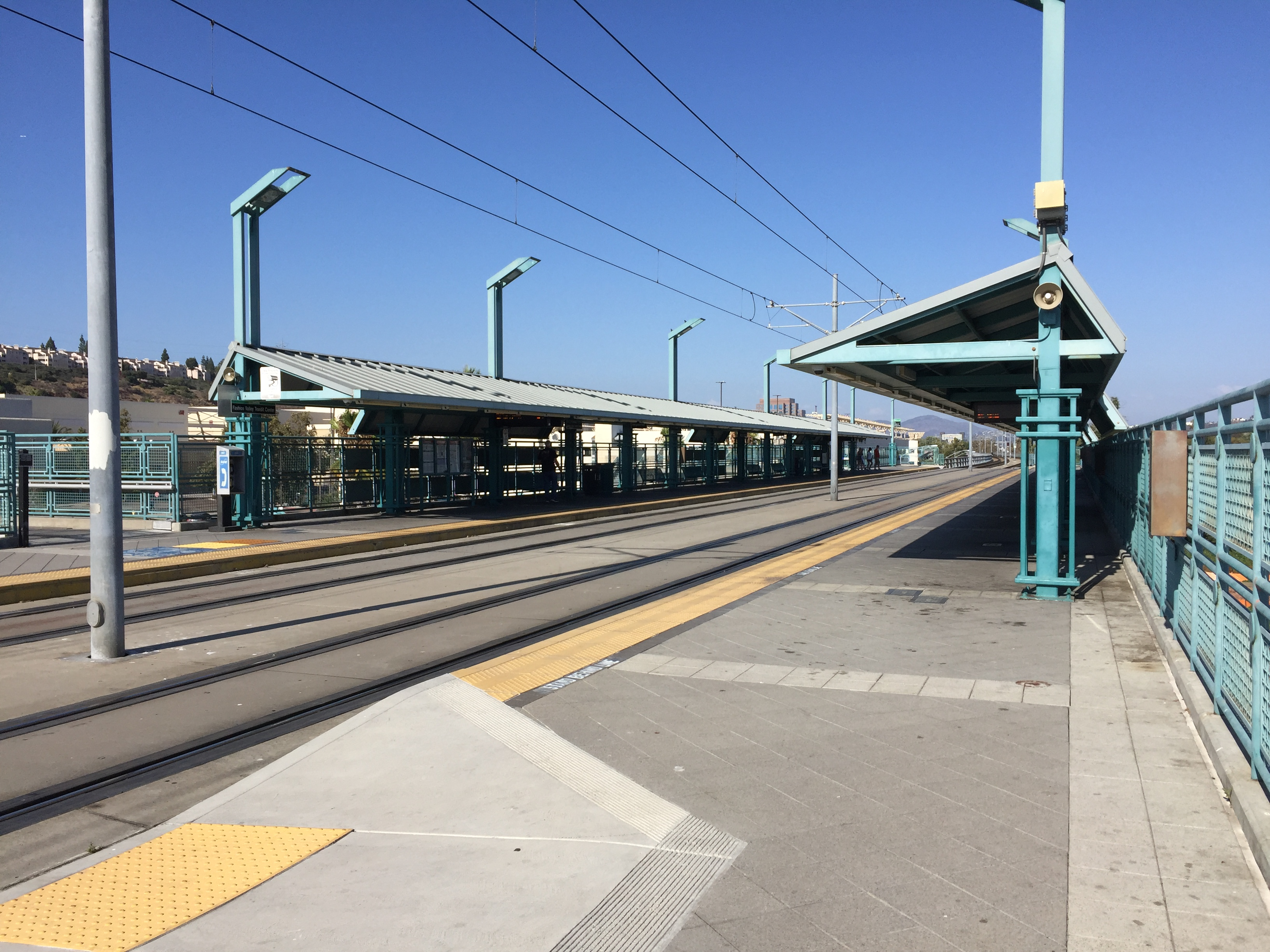
- Fashion Valley Transit Center trolley platform, 2019

General information
- Location: 1205 Fashion Valley Road; San Diego, California; United States
- Coordinates: 32°45′57″N 117°10′10″W
- Owner: San Diego Metropolitan Transit System
- Operator: San Diego Trolley
- Platforms: 2 side platforms
- Tracks: 2
- Connections: MTS: 1, 6, 20, 25, 41, 120, 928

Construction
- Structure type: Elevated
- Parking: 63 spaces
- Cycle facilities: 4 rack spaces, 1 locker
- Accessible: Disabled access

History
- Opened: November 23, 1997
- Rebuilt: 2005

Services
Preceding station	San Diego Trolley	Following station
Morena/Linda Vista toward 12th & Imperial	Green Line	Hazard Center toward El Cajon
Former services
Preceding station	San Diego Trolley	Following station
Morena/Linda Vista toward San Ysidro	Blue Line 1997-2005	Hazard Center toward Mission San Diego
Morena/Linda Vista toward 12th & Imperial	Special Event Line pre-2012	Hazard Center toward Qualcomm Stadium
Location

Fashion Valley Transit Center is an elevated station on the Green Line of the San Diego Trolley system. It is located at the southwest corner of the Fashion Valley Mall, after which the station is named. Below the station platform is a large bus plaza served by several MTS bus routes. The station has a 63 space park and ride lot.

This station opened on November 23, 1997, as part of the Blue Line Mission Valley Line extension to Mission San Diego station. Blue Line service to this station was replaced by the Green Line on July 10, 2005, as part of the Mission Valley East extension. Before the opening of the Mission Valley East extension, this station was rebuilt to raise the platform to accommodate the new low-floor trolley vehicles, giving passengers level access to trains without using steps or a wheelchair lift.
