= Morena/Linda Vista station =

San Diego Trolley station

Morena/Linda Vista
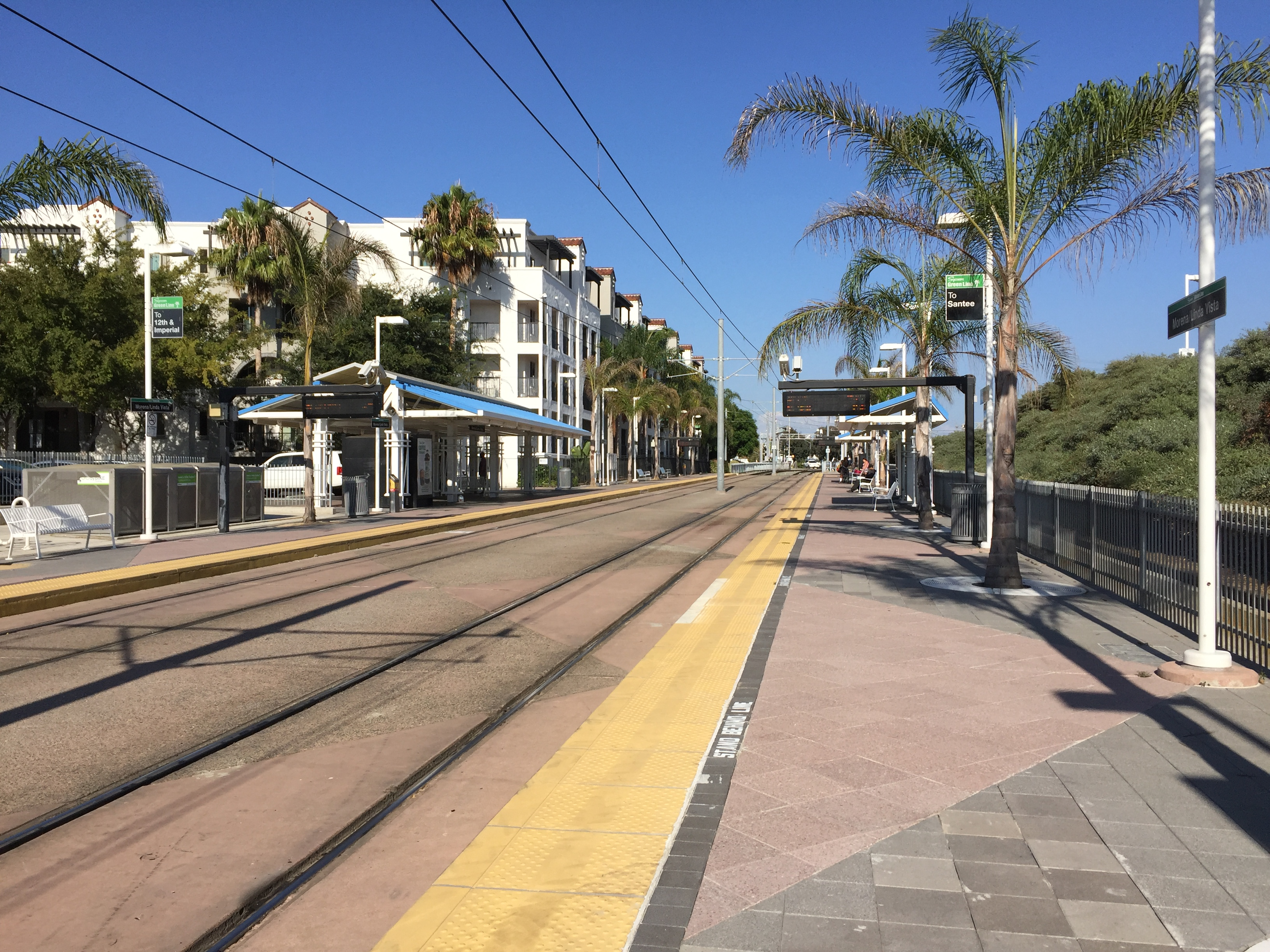
- Morena/Linda Vista station, 2019

General information
- Location: 5210 Linda Vista Road; San Diego, California; United States
- Coordinates: 32°45′49″N 117°11′46″W
- Owner: San Diego Metropolitan Transit System
- Operator: San Diego Trolley
- Platforms: 2 side platforms
- Tracks: 2
- Connections: MTS: 44

Construction
- Structure type: At-grade
- Parking: 199 spaces
- Cycle facilities: 12 rack spaces, 3 lockers
- Accessible: Disabled access

History
- Opened: November 23, 1997
- Rebuilt: 2005

Services
| Preceding station | San Diego Trolley | Following station |
|---|---|---|
| Old Town toward 12th & Imperial | Green Line | Fashion Valley toward El Cajon |
Former services
| Preceding station | San Diego Trolley | Following station |
|---|---|---|
| Old Town Terminus | Green Line | Fashion Valley toward Santee |
| Old Town toward San Ysidro | Blue Line 1997-2005 | Fashion Valley toward Mission San Diego |
| Old Town toward 12th & Imperial | Special Event Line pre-2012 | Fashion Valley toward Qualcomm Stadium |
Location

Morena/Linda Vista station is an at-grade station on the Green Line of the San Diego Trolley system. It is located alongside Friars Road at its intersection with Napa Street. It is located just east of the junction of Morena Boulevard and Linda Vista Road, after which the station is named, in the Morena neighborhood of San Diego.

An apartment complex has been constructed next to the station, which also has a 199 space park and ride lot. The University of San Diego can also be reached on foot from this station, as the western entrance of the university is within approximately 5 blocks of the station.

This station opened on November 23, 1997, as part of the Blue Line Mission Valley Line extension to Mission San Diego station. Blue Line service to this station was replaced by the Green Line on July 10, 2005, as part of the Mission Valley East extension. Before the opening of the Mission Valley East extension, this station was rebuilt to raise the platform to accommodate the new low-floor trolley vehicles, giving passengers level access to trains without using steps or a wheelchair lift.

== See also ==
- List of San Diego Trolley stations
