= County Center/Little Italy station =

San Diego Trolley station

County Center/Little Italy
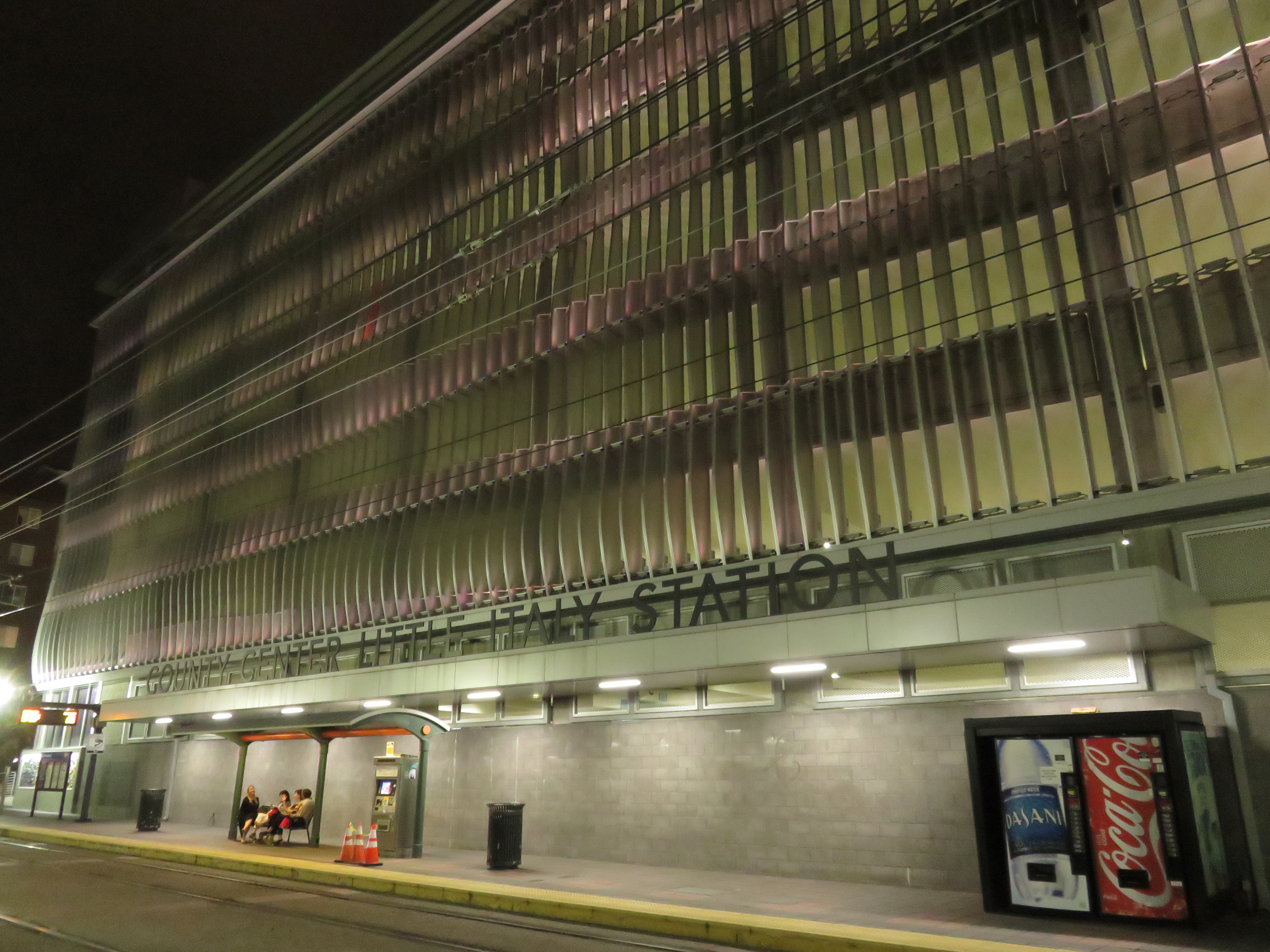
- County Center/Little Italy station in 2019

General information
- Location: 1550 California Street; San Diego, California
- Coordinates: 32°43′21″N 117°10′13″W
- Owner: San Diego Metropolitan Transit System
- Operator: San Diego Trolley
- Line: Surf Line
- Platforms: 2 side platforms
- Tracks: 2

Construction
- Structure type: At-grade
- Accessible: Disabled access

History
- Opened: July 2, 1992
- Rebuilt: 2012

Services
Preceding station	San Diego Trolley	Following station
Middletown toward UTC	Blue Line	Santa Fe Depot toward San Ysidro
Middletown toward El Cajon	Green Line	Santa Fe Depot toward 12th & Imperial
Middletown toward Balboa Avenue	Special Event Line	Santa Fe Depot toward 12th & Imperial
Track layout
Location

County Center/Little Italy station is an at-grade station on the Blue Line and Green Line of the San Diego Trolley system. It is located along the Surf Line right of way between West Beech Street and West Cedar Street, in the Little Italy neighborhood of downtown San Diego. The area has a variety of medium and high-density housing, and is also the site of the County Center, the location of many buildings for the government of San Diego County.

County Center/Little Italy station opened on July 2, 1992 and served as the northern terminus for the North/South Line (later renamed the Blue Line) until the line was extended to Old Town Transit Center in June 1996. This station was closed from August 6 to October 14, 2012 for renovations as part of the Trolley Renewal Project.

== Station layout ==
There are four tracks, two for the trolley station and two passing tracks for commuter, intercity, and BNSF freight service.

== See also ==
- List of San Diego Trolley stations
