= Jenny Craig Pavilion =

Arena at the University of San Diego

- Slim Gym, JCP
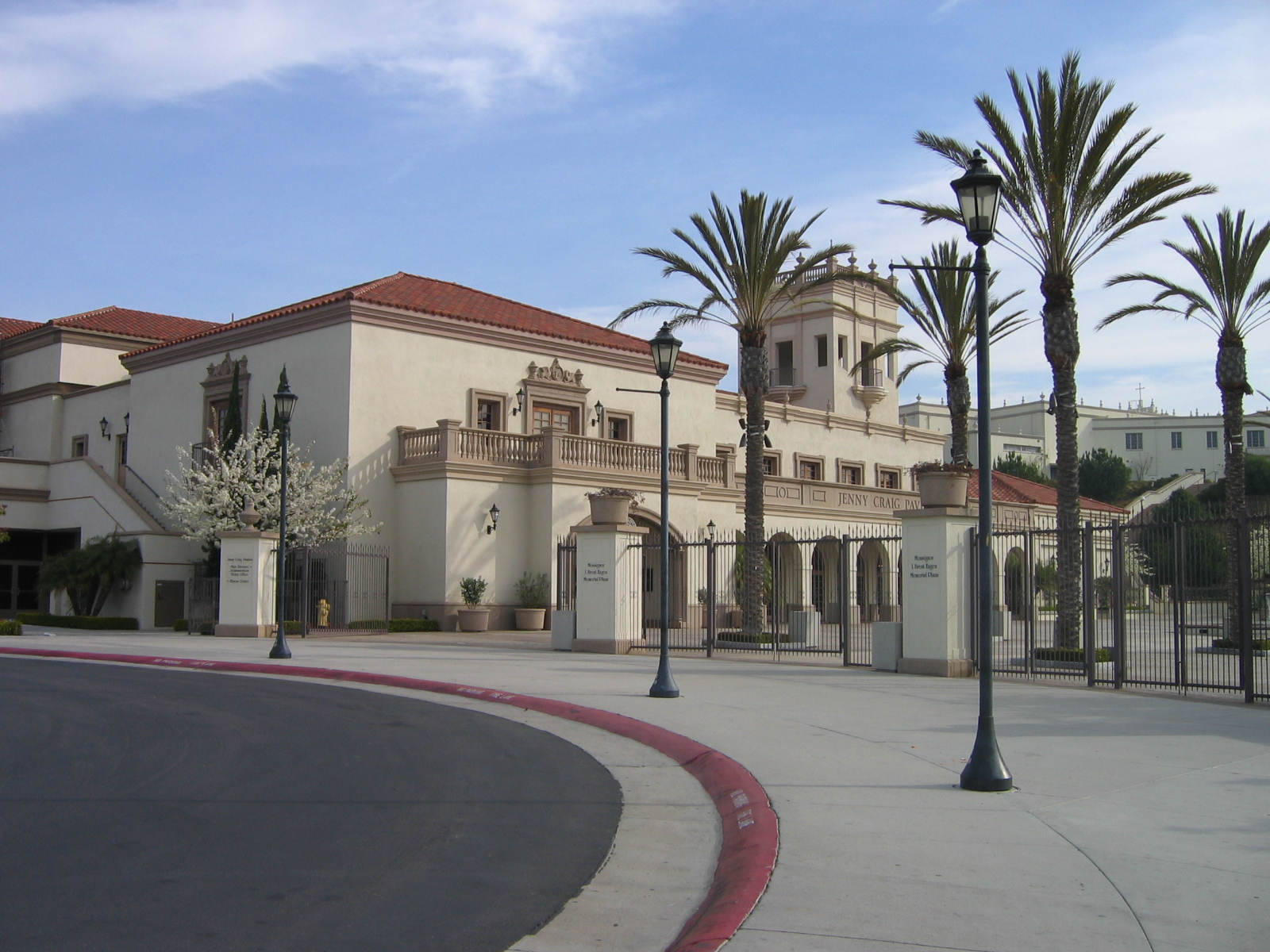
- Interactive map of Jenny Craig Pavilion
- Address: 5998 Alcala Park Way
- Location: San Diego, California
- Coordinates: 32.7745°N 117.1837°W
- Owner: University of San Diego
- Operator: University of San Diego
- Capacity: 5,100
- Surface: Hardwood
- Public transit: Morena/Linda Vista station

Construction
- Groundbreaking: May 6, 1999
- Opened: October 5, 2000
- Cost: $17.5 Million
- Architects: Mosher Drew; CannonDesign
- Structural engineers: Burkett & Wong Engineers
- General contractor: Sundt Construction

Tenant
- San Diego Toreros (NCAA) (2000–present)

The Jenny Craig Pavilion (JCP) is an indoor arena in San Diego, California, located on the campus of the University of San Diego (USD). Opened in 2000, it is the home of the San Diego Toreros men's basketball, women's basketball, and women's volleyball teams. The Toreros compete in NCAA Division I as a member of the West Coast Conference (WCC).

== History ==
The Jenny Craig Pavilion was constructed with the university's architectural theme of the 16th century Spanish Renaissance. It was named for weight-loss entrepreneur Jenny Craig. The arena is sometimes affectionately known as the "Slim Gym", a punning reference to the weight-loss program founded by its namesake.

In 2015, the arena received various upgrades, including a redesigned floor, new video boards, and LED sideline tables from Daktronics.

In 2024, a new center-hung video board was added, as well as LED fascia boards along the baseline seating bowl, new lighting, and a new sound system.

On August 5, 2024, the university announced that Baker Solar and Electric had bought the naming rights to the floor of the arena.

== Events ==
The Jenny Craig Pavilion has been the site of various basketball events, including: The 2001, 2002, 2003, and 2008 West Coast Conference basketball championships, 2002 California Junior College basketball championships, the annual Kiwanis Basketball Tournament, Darrell Russell Celebrity Charity Basketball game, and the 2003 NFL Celebrity Basketball game.

The arena also hosted the official Super Bowl XXXVII Luncheon, 2004 Judo National Championships, and the 2004 and 2013 first and second rounds of the NCAA women's volleyball tournament. Additionally, the United States men's national volleyball team hosted a friendly with No. 1 ranked Brazil in 2015.

The arena also has hosted commencement exercises and special events, including music concerts featuring Maroon 5, and guest speakers from the 14th Dalai Lama and Jane Goodall.

== See also ==
- List of NCAA Division I basketball arenas
