= Green Line (San Diego Trolley) =

Light rail line in San Diego County, California

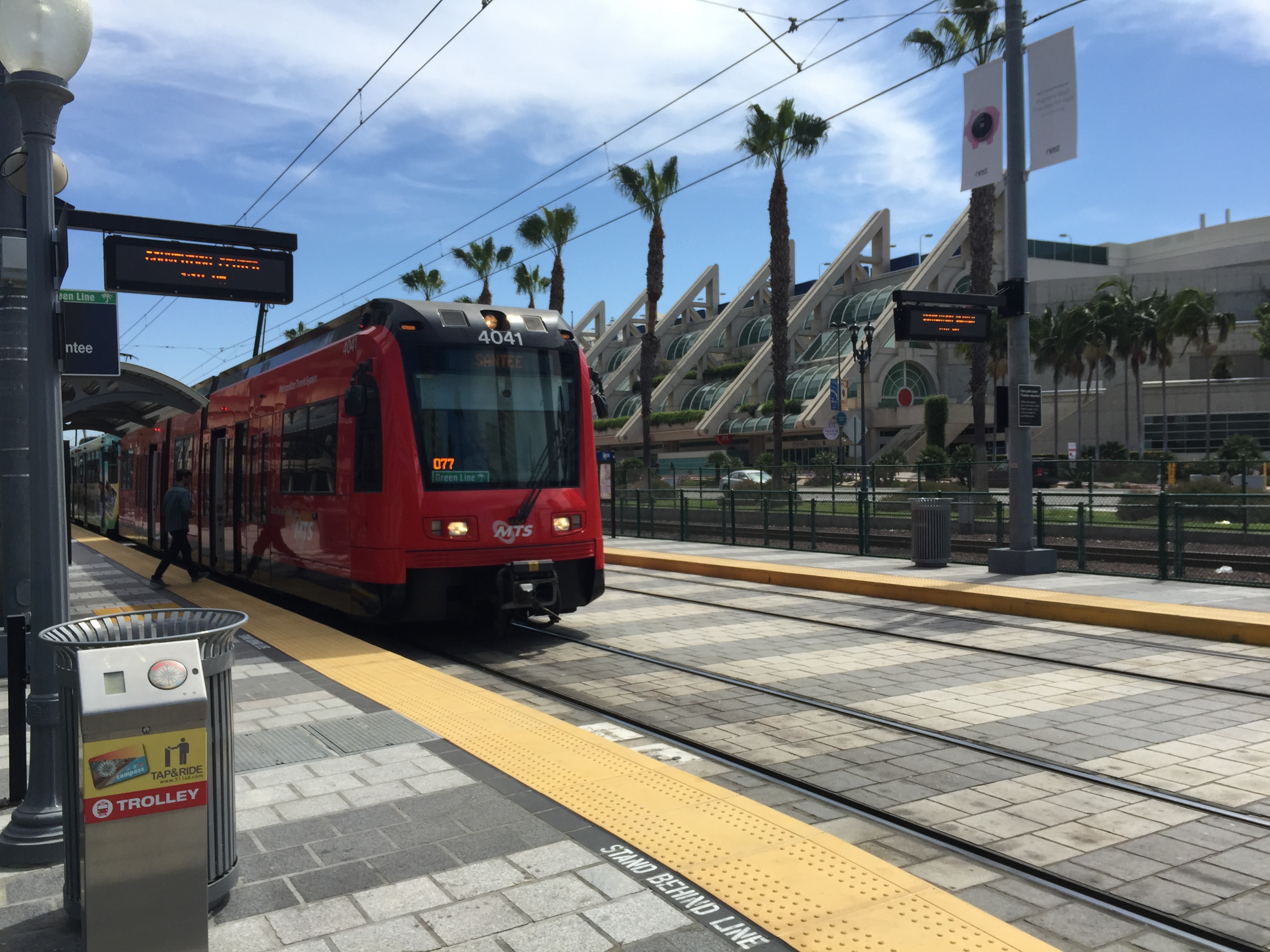
- A Green Line trolley at Convention Center station

Overview
- Owner: Metropolitan Transit System
- Locale: San Diego, California
- Termini: 12th & Imperial; El Cajon
- Stations: 24
- Website: sdmts.com/schedules-real-time-maps-and-routes/trolley

Service
- Type: Light rail
- System: San Diego Trolley
- Route number: 530 (in internal documents only)
- Operator: San Diego Trolley, Inc.
- Rolling stock: 3-car trains
- Daily ridership: 24,795 (FY 2026)
- Ridership: 9,020,491 (FY 2026)

History
- Opened: July 10, 2005; 21 years ago

Technical
- Line length: 19.8 mi (31.9 km)
- Num of tracks: 2 tracks
- Track gauge: 4 ft 8 1/2 in (1,435 mm) standard gauge
- Electrification: Overhead line, 600 V DC
- Operating speed: 21 mph (34 km/h) (average) (Note: Calculated from the following: Route length (19.8 miles) divided by scheduled travel time (57 minutes)); 55 mph (89 km/h) (max)
Route map
Green Line highlighted in green

The Green Line is a 19.8-mile (31.9 km) light rail line in the San Diego Trolley system, operated by San Diego Trolley, Inc. an operating division of the San Diego Metropolitan Transit System (MTS). The route serves downtown San Diego, Mission Valley, and the cities of La Mesa and El Cajon. The Green Line has the second highest ridership of the San Diego Trolley's three core lines, transporting 13,673,926 riders during FY 2014 - according to MTS.

The line is one of five lines in the trolley system, the others being the Blue, Orange, Copper, and Silver ("heritage weekend" service only) lines.

== History ==
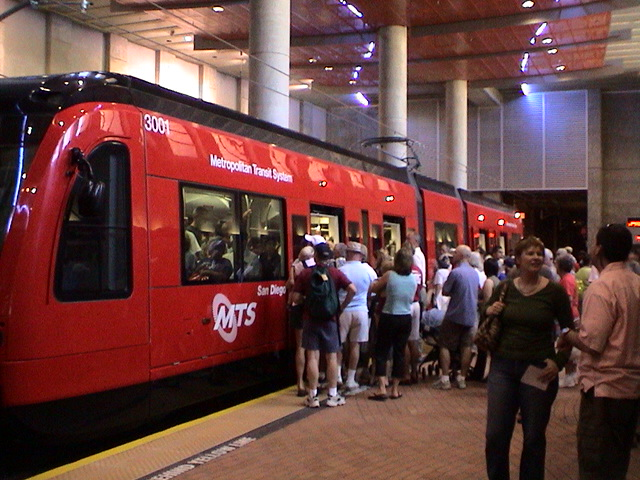
Siemens S70 Green Line train at SDSU Transit Center, on the station's opening day (July 10, 2005)

The Green Line is the third line in the San Diego Trolley system, with service beginning on July 10, 2005 along with the completion and opening of the 5.9 miles (9.5 km) Mission Valley East extension.

The line primarily operates on this extension as well as a segment previously served by the Blue Line between Old Town and Mission San Diego. It traverses Mission Valley and the San Diego River corridor for this segment.

During a system redesign which took effect on September 2, 2012, as part of the Trolley Renewal Project, the western portion of the Green Line was extended from Old Town south through downtown and along the Bayside Line, terminating at 12th & Imperial Transit Center's Bayside Platform. This redesign allowed for two "universal" transfer points among all three core lines: the 12th & Imperial Transit Center and Santa Fe Depot Transit Center (which consists of Santa Fe Depot, America Plaza, and Courthouse stations, as well as the Santa Fe Depot/America Plaza Rapid terminal).

In May 2024, MTS announced that a new service, known as the East County Connector (and later the Copper Line), would replace the Green and Orange lines between El Cajon Transit Center and the eastern terminus at Santee. The proposal was prompted by service issues caused by the merge of the double track to a single track between the final two stations, creating delays for Green Line trolleys waiting for the track to clear. On September 29, 2024, Green and Orange Line service was cut back to El Cajon Transit Center, and service on the Copper Line began.

The Green Line's SDSU Transit Center is the only underground station in the entire trolley network.

=== Naming rights ===
In October 2017, Sycuan Casino secured the naming rights for the Green Line when the MTS had sought out to sell out the naming rights for each line in the trolley system. The line was then named the Sycuan Green Line. However, this is no longer the case. Since late 2021, this name no longer appears on official sources, including the SDMTS website.

The Green Line is home to a paid station naming sponsorship, with the former Alvarado Medical Center station being known as UC San Diego Health East station.

== Stations ==
Station	Location	Connections
12th & Imperial	East Village, San Diego	Blue Line Orange Line Silver Line; MTS: 4, 12, 901, 910 (Overnight Express), 929; Greyhound Lines; Park and ride: 1,020 spaces, paid
Gaslamp Quarter	Gaslamp Quarter, San Diego	Silver Line
Convention Center	Marina, San Diego	Silver Line
Seaport Village	Marina, San Diego	Silver Line
Santa Fe Depot	Core, San Diego	Blue Line Orange Line; Pacific Surfliner; Coaster; MTS: 83, Rapid 215, Rapid 225, Rapid 235, Rapid Express 280, Rapid Express 290, 923, 992
County Center/Little Italy	Little Italy, San Diego	Blue Line
Middletown	Middletown, San Diego	Blue Line; (via) TROLLEY → TERMINAL shuttle
Washington Street	Mission Hills, San Diego	Blue Line; MTS: 10
Old Town	Old Town, San Diego	Blue Line; Pacific Surfliner; Coaster; MTS: 8, 9, 10, 28, 30, 35, 44, 83, 88, 105; (via) San Diego Flyer shuttle; University of San Diego shuttle; UC San Diego Triton Transit: Hillcrest Express; Park and ride: 412 spaces
Morena/Linda Vista	Morena, San Diego	MTS: 44, 105; Park and ride: 199 spaces
Riverwalk (2029)	Mission Valley, San Diego	
Fashion Valley	Mission Valley, San Diego	MTS: 1, 6, 20, 25, 41, 88, 120, 928; Park and ride: 63 spaces
Hazard Center	Mission Valley, San Diego	
Mission Valley Center	Mission Valley, San Diego	MTS: 6
Rio Vista	Mission Valley, San Diego	
Fenton Parkway	Mission Valley, San Diego	
Stadium	Mission Valley, San Diego	
Mission San Diego	Grantville, San Diego	MTS: 14
Grantville	Grantville, San Diego	MTS: 13, 14, 18
SDSU	College Area, San Diego	MTS: 11, 14, 115, Rapid 215, 856, 936, 955
UC San Diego Health East	College Area, San Diego	
70th Street	La Mesa	MTS: 14; Park and ride: 125 spaces
Grossmont	La Mesa	Orange Line; MTS: 852, 854; Park and ride: 220 spaces
Amaya Drive	La Mesa	Orange Line; Park and ride: 236 spaces
El Cajon	El Cajon	Orange Line Copper Line; MTS: 115, 815, 816, 833, 848, 864, 872, 874, 875, 888, 891, 892, 894; Greyhound Lines; Sycuan Casino Shuttle; Park and ride: 469 spaces
