= Del Mar Fairgrounds Platform =

Proposed passenger train station in San Diego, California, United States

Del Mar Fairgrounds

General information
- Location: Del Mar, California
- Coordinates: 32°58′35″N 117°16′03″W
- Owner: North County Transit District
- Line: NCTD San Diego Subdivision
- Platforms: 1 side platform
- Tracks: 2

Construction
- Accessible: Yes

History
- Opening: 2031

Future services
Preceding station	Amtrak	Following station
Solana Beach toward San Luis Obispo	Pacific Surfliner Special events	San Diego–Old Town toward San Diego
Preceding station	North County Transit District	Following station
Solana Beach toward Oceanside	COASTER Special events	Sorrento Valley toward Santa Fe Depot or Downtown
Location

Del Mar Fairgrounds is a planned Amtrak and Coaster special events station to be built in Del Mar, California. It will operate during special events at the Del Mar Fairgrounds.

The station is to be built alongside the San Dieguito Double Track program, which would replace the San Dieguito Bridge, a single-tracked wooden trestle bridge over the San Dieguito River originally built by the Atchison, Topeka and Santa Fe Railway in 1916, with a new, double-tracked concrete San Dieguito Railway River Bridge. As of 2026, the San Dieguito Bridge was 110 years old.

Both the bridge and the station were originally proposed by SANDAG in 2015, with the design phase beginning in 2017. By June 2021, NCTD had approved $5.5 million to design the track and the platform. Later, in April 2023, the California State Transportation Agency's California Transit and Intercity Rail Capital Program awarded $100 million to NCTD and SANDAG to fund the bridge and station.

Later, in July 2026, the California Transportation Commission announced that it would grant $214.3 million to SANDAG and NCTD for the San Dieguito Double Track program, thereby fully funding the project. It is currently expected to begin construction in 2027, with the bridge and station opening in mid-2031.

When completed in 2031, it would allow the Pacific Surfliner and Coaster to directly serve the Del Mar Fairgrounds.

== Current fairground service ==
Currently, the NCTD and San Diego Metropolitan Transit System operate a special ticket called the Fair Tripper for passengers going to the Del Mar Fairgrounds. The NCTD also operates a free shuttle bus from the Solana Beach station to the Del Mar Fairgrounds for Fair Tripper passengers.
