= Old Town, San Diego =

Community in San Diego, California

Coordinates: 32°45′27.45″N 117°11′44.11″W

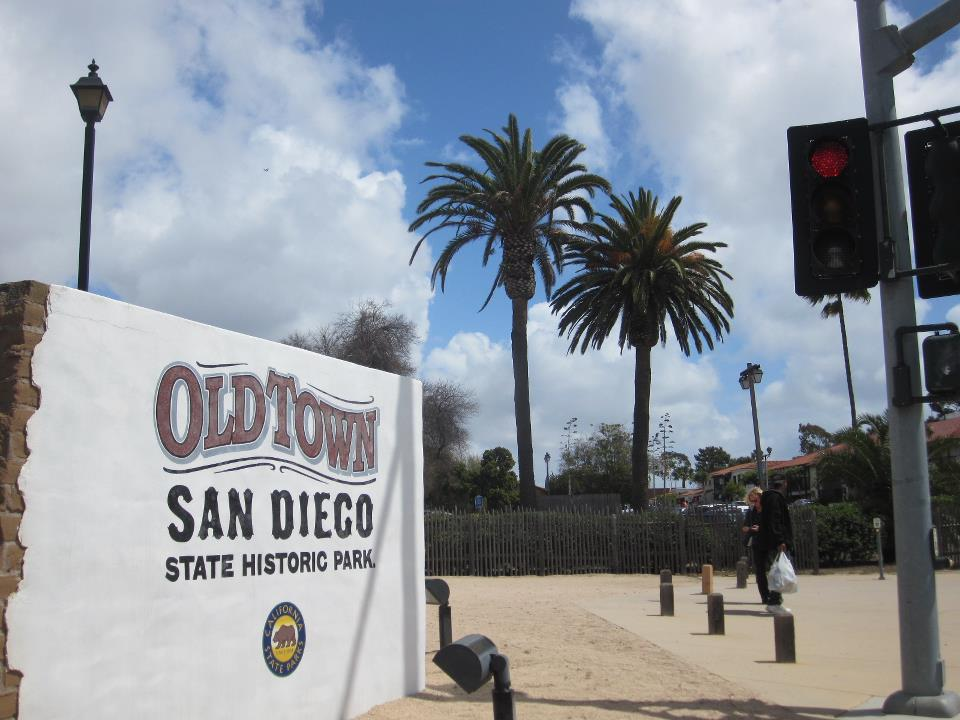
The entrance of Old town

Old Town is a neighborhood in San Diego, California. It contains 230 acres (93 ha) and is bounded by Interstate 8 on the north, Interstate 5 on the west, Mission Hills on the east and south. It is the oldest settled area in San Diego and is the site of the first European settlement in present-day California. It contains Old Town San Diego State Historic Park and Presidio Park, both of which are listed on the National Register of Historic Places.

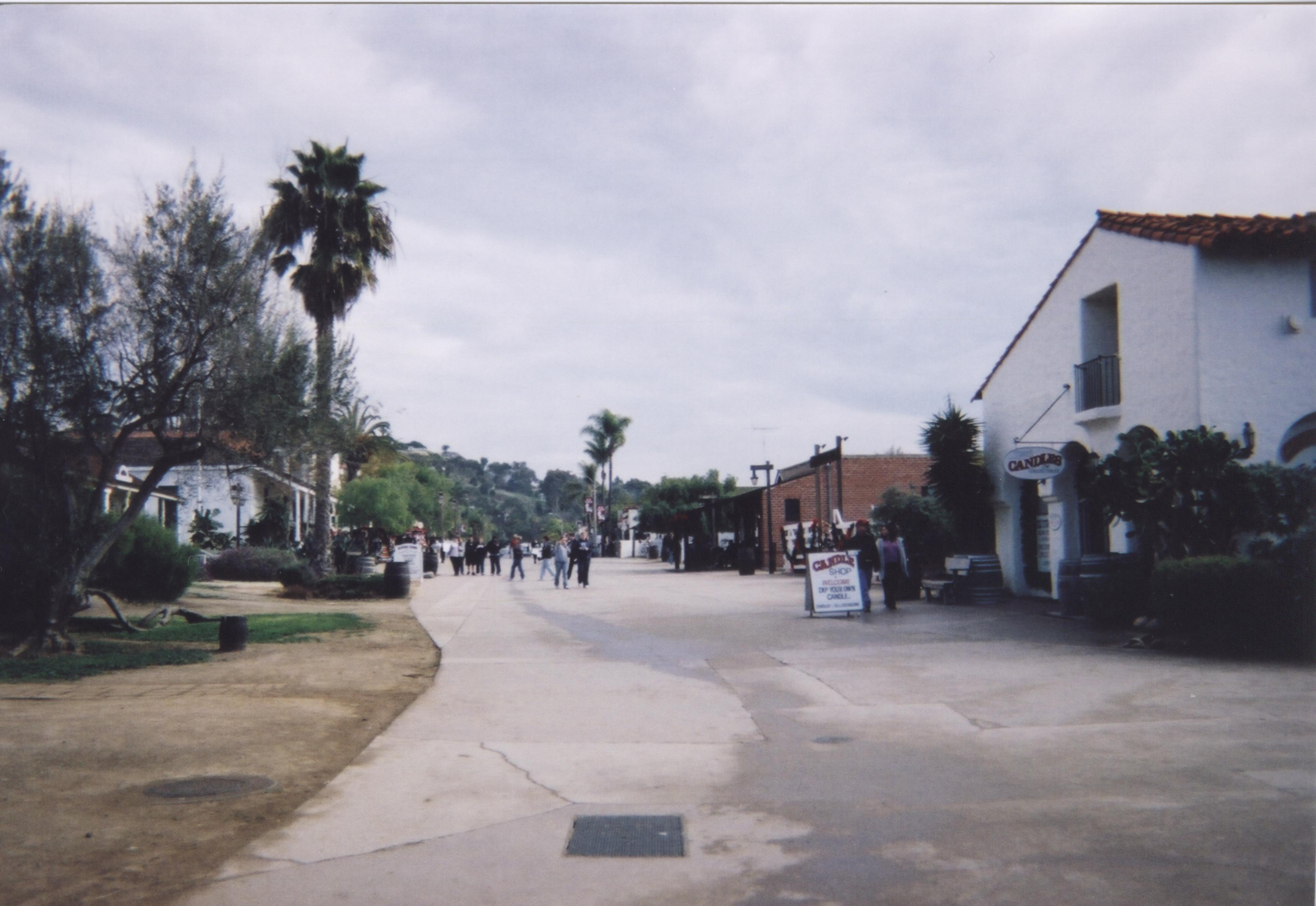
Old Town State Historical Park

== History ==
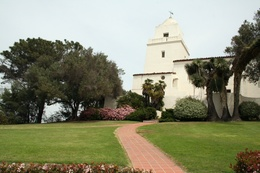
The Serra Museum in Presidio Park marks the original site of the Presidio and Mission

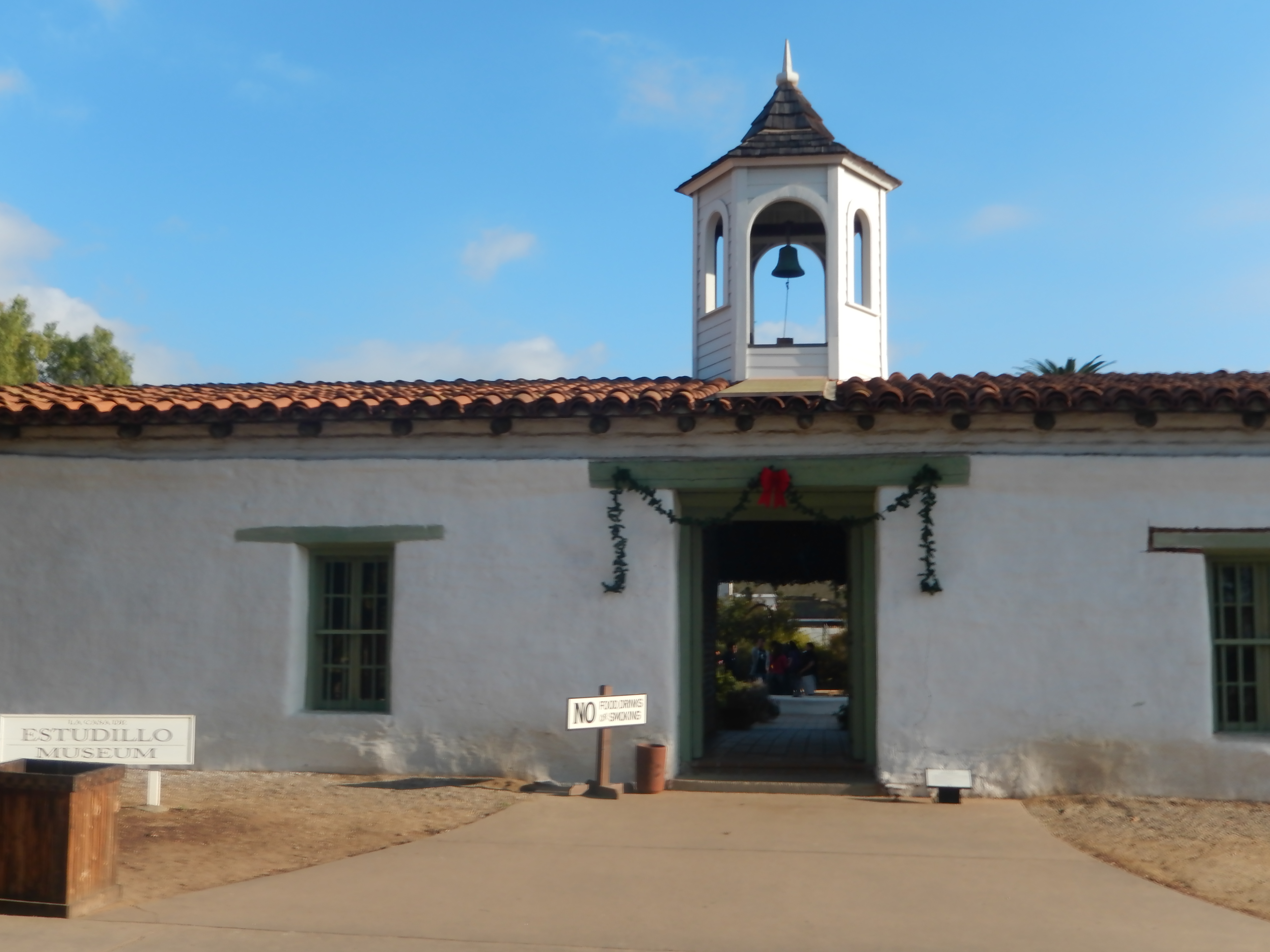
La Casa de Estudillo Museum, Old Town

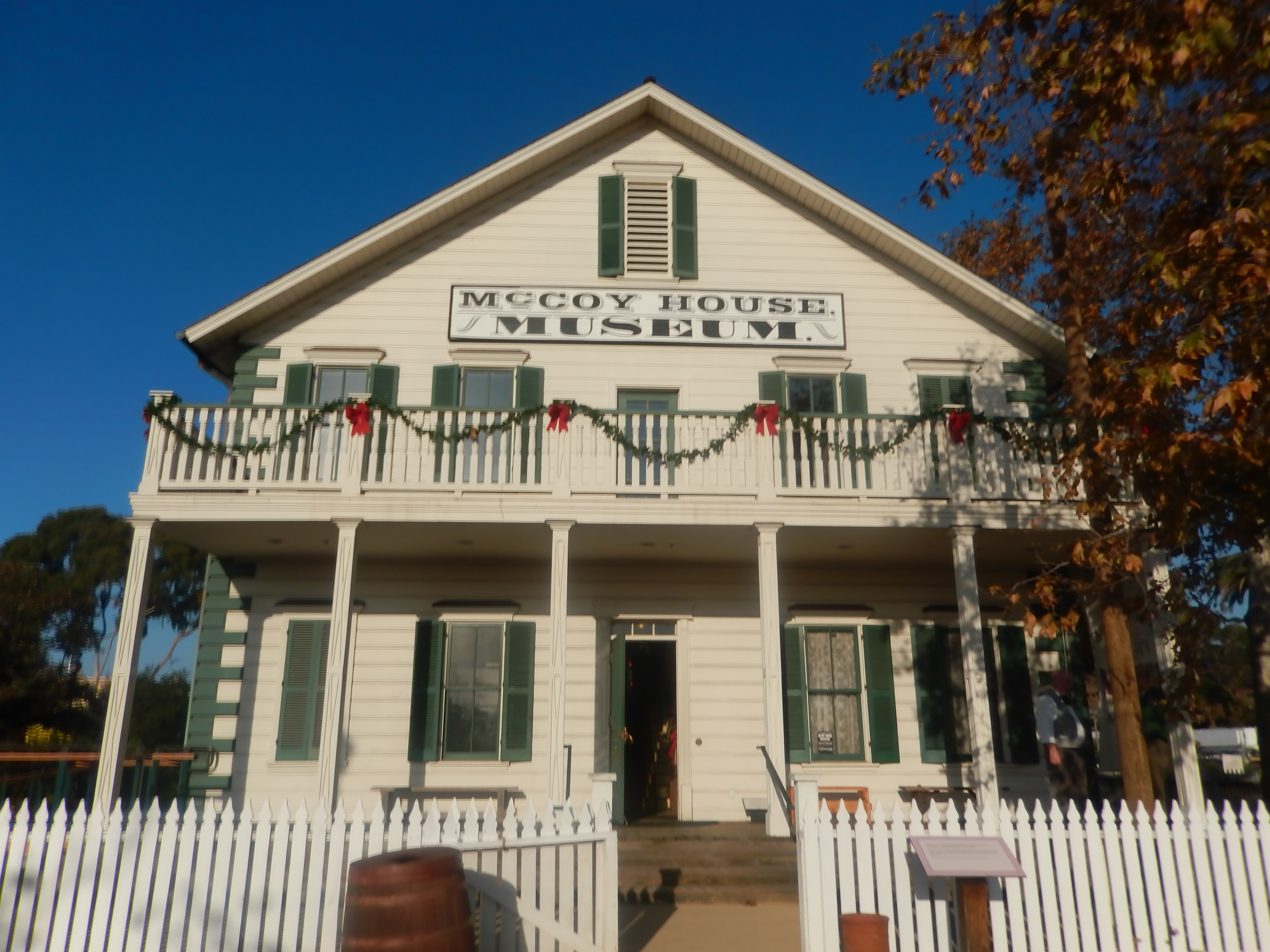
McCoy House Museum

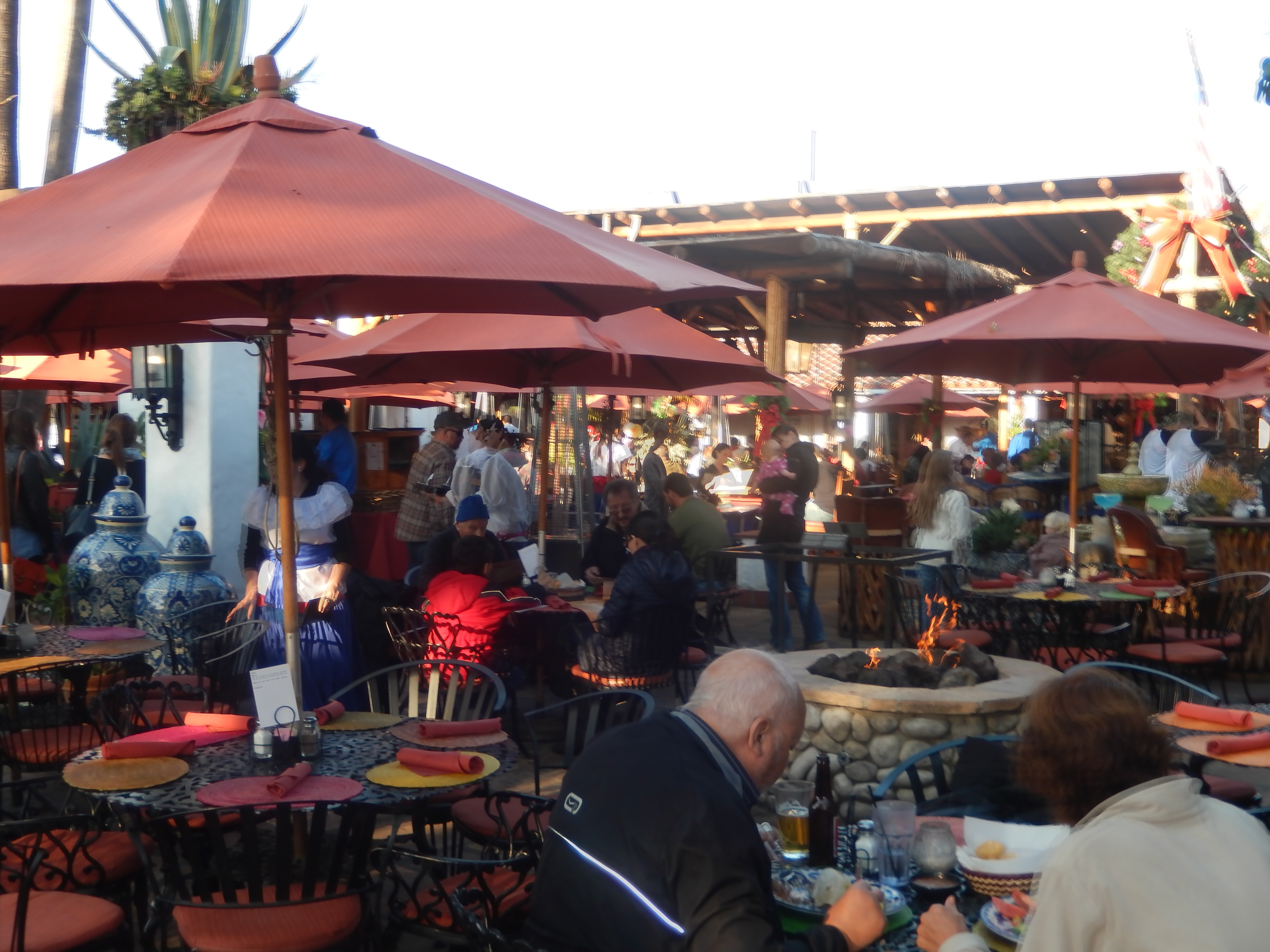
Outdoor cafes at Old Town

Before European contact, the Kumeyaay established the village of Kosa'aay in the Kumeyaay language, which consisted of thirty to forty families living in pyramid-shaped housing structures. The Kumeyaay people were the original inhabitants of San Diego County and played a significant role in the region’s history. For over 10,000 years, they thrived as horticulturists, hunters, and gatherers. They were the first to encounter Europeans when the Juan Rodriguez Cabrillo expedition sailed into San Diego Harbor in 1542.

The San Diego Presidio and Mission San Diego de Alcalá were founded in 1769 by Gaspar de Portolá and Junípero Serra on a bluff at the western end of the San Diego River valley adjacent to the village of Cosoy after the villagers had provided resources to the Portolá expedition. The Presidio and Mission constituted the first Spanish settlement in Alta California, the present day state of California. After five years the Mission moved to a location several miles upriver, while the Presidio on its hill remained the primary settlement. In the 1820s the town of San Diego grew up at the base of the bluff, at the site commemorated by Old Town San Diego State Historic Park, while the Presidio fell into disrepair.

In 1834 the Mexican government granted San Diego the status of a pueblo, or chartered town. However, the population of the town declined so much that in 1838 its pueblo status was revoked. One problem was the town's location far from navigable water. All imports and exports had to be brought ashore in Point Loma and carried several miles over the La Playa Trail to the town.

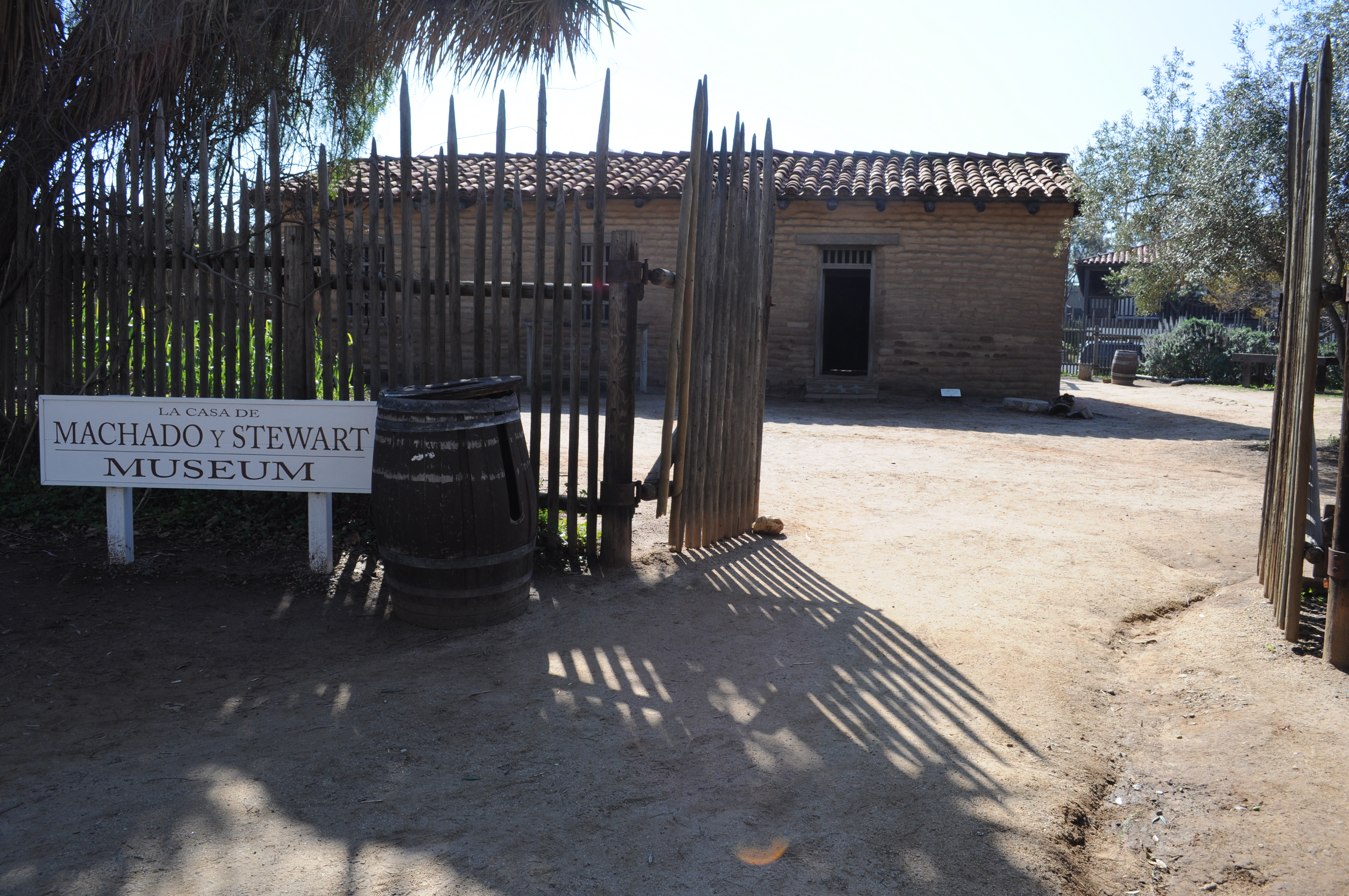
The Casa de Machado y Stewart, an 1830s adobe house in Old Town San Diego State Historic Park.

When California was admitted to the United States in 1850, San Diego (still largely limited to the Old Town area) was made the seat of government of San Diego County, though the town's population was only 650.

The Old Town area remained the heart of the city of San Diego until the 1860s, when a newcomer to San Diego named Alonzo Horton began to promote development at the site of present-day downtown San Diego. Residents and businesses quickly abandoned "Old Town" for Horton's "New Town" because of New Town's proximity to shipping. In 1871, government records were moved from Old Town to a new county courthouse in New Town, and downtown permanently eclipsed Old Town as the focal point of San Diego.

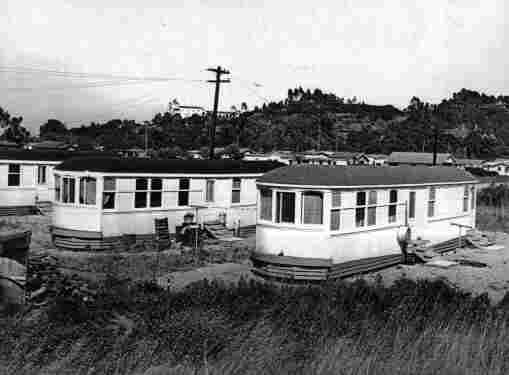
Class 1 Streetcar homes in the Old Town neighborhood of San Diego, California.

In the 1910s, Old Town became one of the many San Diego neighborhoods connected by the Class 1 streetcars and an extensive San Diego public transit system that was spurred by the Panama–California Exposition of 1915 and built by John D. Spreckels. These streetcars became a fixture of this neighborhood until their retirement in 1939.

== Economy ==
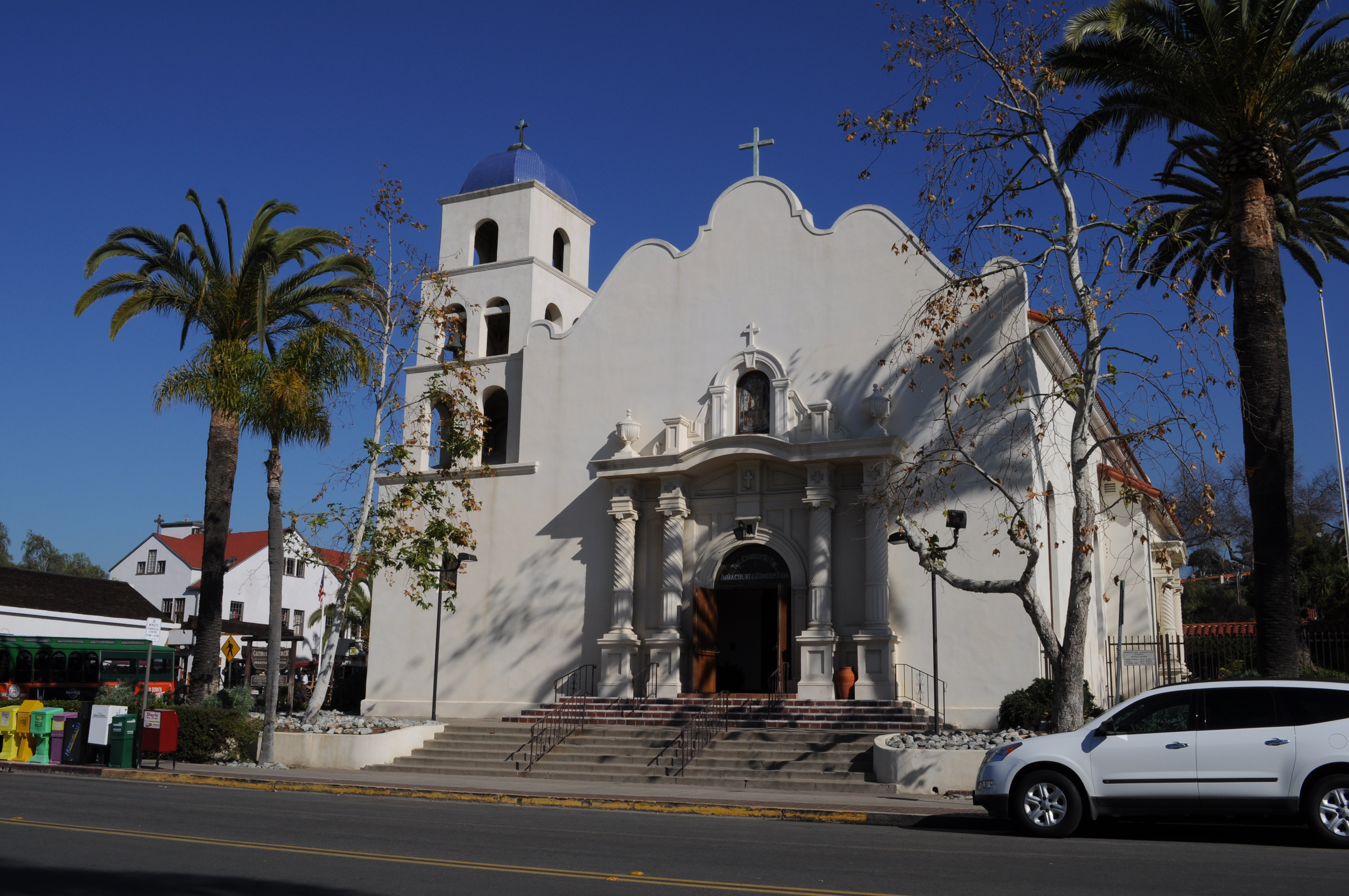
Church of the Immaculate Conception (built 1917).

With the expansion of Northern California due to the Gold Rush, San Diego’s development gained momentum under businessman Alonzo E. Horton in 1867. Horton laid out a new city plan three miles south of Old Town, capitalizing on the area’s appealing climate and infrastructure, setting the foundation for future growth (Britannica). Horton’s vision and the arrival of the railway connected San Diego to national markets, transforming the city into a commercial hub. San Diego saw increased growth during the next few years due to its development as a health and tourist resort, attracting those seeking to escape the harsh weather of the East.

The Old Town neighborhood has nine hotels, 32 restaurants and more than 100 specialty shops. Shopping areas within Old Town include Fiesta de Reyes ("Party of Kings") and Bazaar del Mundo. There are 12 art galleries and 27 historic buildings and sites, including Old Town San Diego State Historic Park, Presidio Park, and the Mormon Battalion Historic Site. The area also contains Heritage Park, a county park showcasing historic buildings which were moved to the site from other locations, including several Victorian homes and San Diego's first synagogue, Temple Beth Israel. A major government building is the District 11 headquarters of Caltrans, the California Department of Transportation.

== Annual events ==
San Diego's Cinco de Mayo celebration is held in Old Town every year.

The Old Town Art Festival takes place in October of each year.

San Diego's Dia de los Muertos is annual community-wide celebration held every November 1 and 2.

Fiesta Navidad is a two-day Christmas festival in December, highlighted by the Mexican tradition of Las Posadas, which re-enacts the story of Mary and Joseph's journey to Bethlehem for the first Christmas.

== Community organizations ==
The Old Town Community Planning Committee advises the city on land use and other issues. The Old Town San Diego Chamber of Commerce promotes business interests and tourism. Local service organizations include a Kiwanis club.

The Boosters of Old Town (BOOT) is a support organization for Old Town San Diego State Historic Park. Their financial support and assistance helps provide funds for a period attire clothing bank and for special programming and events such as Ladies Day, Historic 4 July, Fiestas Patrias, Holiday in the Park, and descendant activities. They also operate the BOOT Store in the Robinson-Rose Visitor Center, support the Blacksmith Shop, maintain a history research library, and publish the "Poppy Paper," an official monthly newsletter.

The nonprofit Save Our Heritage Organisation (SOHO) operates two museums in Old Town San Diego: the Adobe Chapel Museum and the Whaley House Museum.

== Infrastructure ==
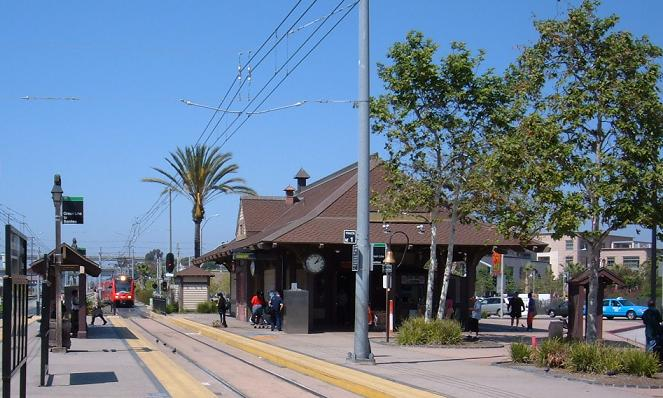
Old Town Transit Center

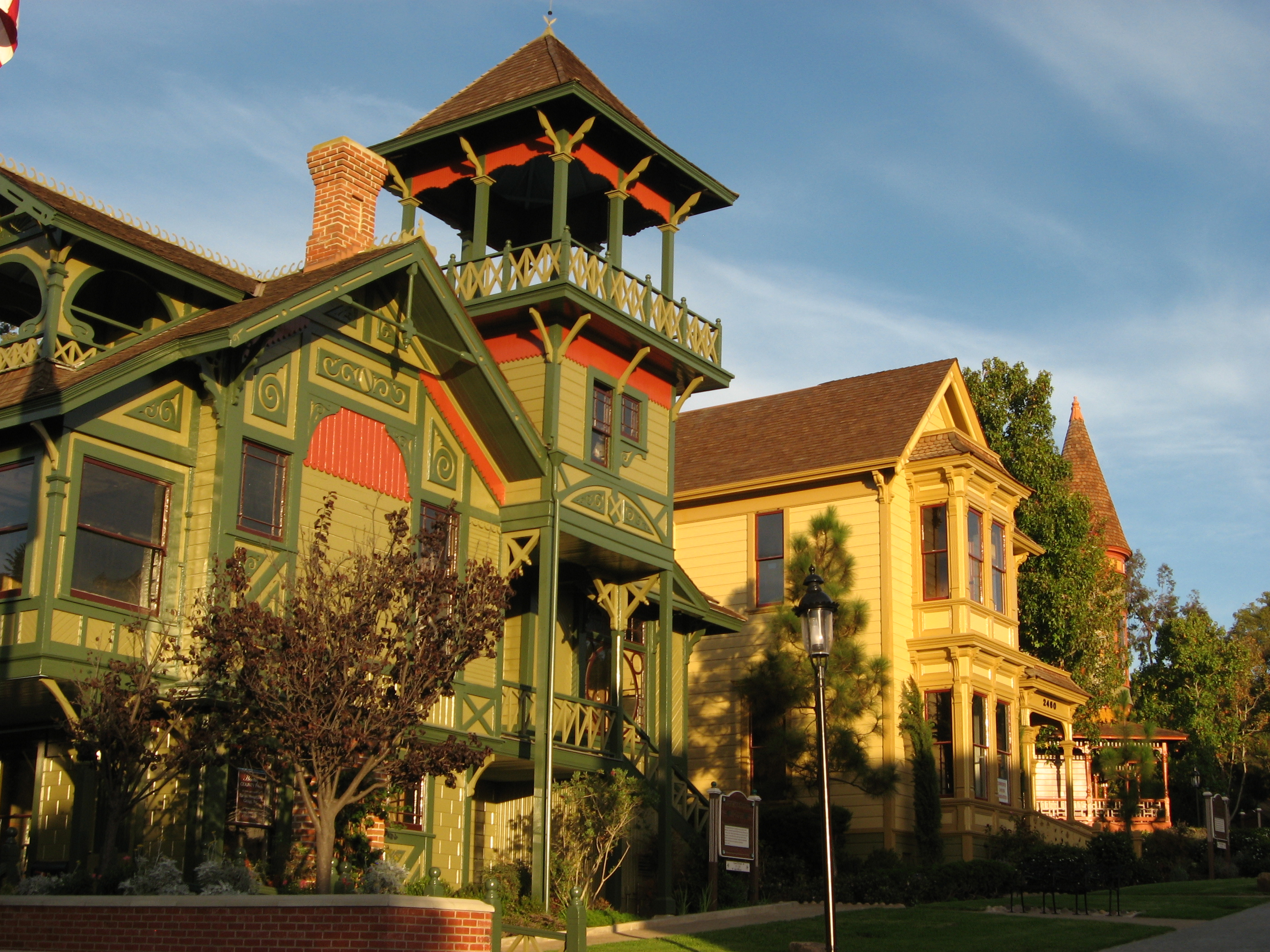
Houses in Old Town

The Old Town Transit Center is a major intermodal transportation station where travelers can transfer between San Diego Metropolitan Transit System city buses, the Green Line & Blue Line of the San Diego Trolley, the Coaster commuter rail service, and the regional rail system of Amtrak in the form of its inter-city Pacific Surfliner route.

== See also ==
- Old Town-Mission Valley travel guide from Wikivoyage
- History of San Diego
- Two Years Before the Mast by Richard Henry Dana
- Ramona by Helen Hunt Jackson
- California Historical Landmarks in San Diego County
- Casa de Carrillo House oldest house in San Diego
- Plaza de Las Armas Landmarks
