= Old Town Transit Center =

Train and bus station in San Diego, California, United States

Old Town Transit Center San Diego, CA
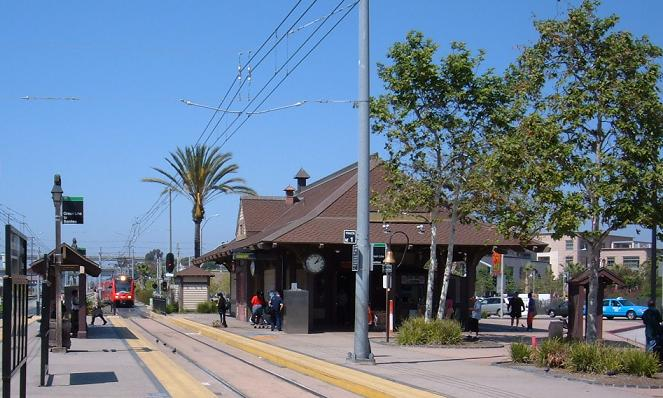
- Green Line trolley approaching Old Town Transit Center in 2008

General information
- Other names: San Diego–Old Town; Old Town San Diego
- Location: 4005 Taylor Street; San Diego, California; United States
- Coordinates: 32°45′19″N 117°11′58″W
- Owner: San Diego Metropolitan Transit System
- Line: NCTD San Diego Subdivision
- Platforms: 2 side platforms (Amtrak/Coaster); 2 side platforms, 1 island platform (San Diego Trolley)
- Tracks: 2 (Amtrak/Coaster); 2 (San Diego Trolley)
- Train operators: Amtrak; Coaster; San Diego Trolley
- Bus stands: 21
- Bus operators: MTS: 8, 9, 10, 28, 30, 35, 44, 83, 84X, 88, 105; (via SAN Flyer shuttle); University of San Diego shuttle; UC San Diego Triton Transit: Hillcrest Express; FlixBus

Construction
- Parking: 412 spaces
- Accessible: Yes

Other information
- Status: Unstaffed, platform with shelters
- Station code: Amtrak: OLT; 75042, 75043 (San Diego Trolley)
- Fare zone: 3 (Coaster)

History
- Opened: 1994; 32 years ago

Passengers
- FY 2025: 308,805 (Amtrak)

Services
Preceding station	Amtrak	Following station
Solana Beach toward San Luis Obispo	Pacific Surfliner	San Diego Terminus
Preceding station	North County Transit District	Following station
Sorrento Valley toward Oceanside	COASTER	Santa Fe Depot Terminus
Preceding station	San Diego Trolley	Following station
Tecolote Road toward UTC	Blue Line	Washington Street toward San Ysidro
Tecolote Road toward Balboa Avenue	Special Event Line	Washington Street toward 12th & Imperial
Morena/Linda Vista toward El Cajon	Green Line	Washington Street toward 12th & Imperial
Former services
Preceding station	San Diego Trolley	Following station
Morena/Linda Vista toward Santee	Green Line 2005-2012	Terminus
Terminus	Blue Line 2005-2012	Washington Street toward San Ysidro
Morena/Linda Vista toward Mission San Diego	Blue Line 1997-2005	Washington Street toward San Ysidro
Morena/Linda Vista toward Qualcomm Stadium	Special Event Line pre-2012	Washington Street toward 12th & Imperial
Future services (2031)
Preceding station	Amtrak	Following station
Del Mar Fairgrounds Special events only toward San Luis Obispo	Pacific Surfliner	San Diego Terminus
Track layout
Key
Location

Old Town Transit Center, also known as San Diego–Old Town station, or Old Town San Diego station, is an intermodal transportation station in the Old Town neighborhood of San Diego, California. It is served by Amtrak's Pacific Surfliner, the COASTER commuter rail service, and the San Diego Trolley, as well as numerous San Diego Metropolitan Transit System bus lines.

The station is located at the intersection of Rosecrans Street/Taylor Street and Pacific Highway, adjacent to Old Town San Diego State Historic Park and the freeway intersection of Interstate 5 and Interstate 8. It is also located about two miles southeast of SeaWorld San Diego and Mission Bay, providing access to the northernmost beaches in the city of San Diego. Free parking (Park & Ride) for up to 24-hours is available in the Transit Center lots.

== History ==
Old Town Transit Center was built in the early 1990s, and the San Diego Trolley's North/South Line (known until then as the South Line) was extended here on June 16, 1996. In November 1997, the line, renamed the Blue Line, was extended into Mission Valley. When the Green Line service was introduced with the opening of the Mission Valley East extension on July 10, 2005, the Blue Line's northern terminus was pushed back to this station, which also served as the Green Line's western terminus. During a system redesign on September 2, 2012, as part of the Trolley Renewal Project, MTS extended the western terminus of the Green Line from this station to 12th & Imperial Bayside Terminal and shortened the Blue Line's northern terminus to America Plaza. The Special Event Line was eliminated; and instead, the Green Line added cars and offer more frequent service to the San Diego Convention Center, Petco Park, Snapdragon Stadium, and Viejas Arena when necessary.

As part of the Mid Coast Trolley Project, on November 21, 2021, the Blue Line returned to service the Old Town station. The Blue Line provides access to places such as the University of California, San Diego, Jacobs Medical Center, Westfield UTC, and the Mexico–United States border in San Ysidro.

== Service ==
=== Commuter and intercity rail ===
The Old Town Transit Center hosts passenger trains operating on Amtrak's Pacific Surfliner intercity rail route and on the COASTER commuter rail service. Of the 22 weekday Amtrak Pacific Surfliner trains operating in San Diego, 18 of them stop at the Old Town Transit Center, though the Surfliner trains operating at Old Town do not offer checked luggage service, and stop at Old Town to board passengers (northbound trains) or detrain passengers (southbound trains) only, respectively.

Amtrak ridership at Old Town Transit Center has exploded between Fiscal Year 2011 and 2013. In Fiscal Year 2011, there were just 22,867 boardings and detrainings at Old Town (which was a 5.79% increase over Fiscal Year 2010). In Fiscal Year 2012, boardings and detrainings at Old Town rose to 61,118, a 167% increase over FY2011. As of Fiscal Year 2013, the Amtrak ridership figure has continued to rise, to 135,749 boardings and detrainings, a further 122% increase over FY2012. (There has been a corresponding decrease in Amtrak boardings at Santa Fe Depot in downtown San Diego over this same period, possibly indicating that some Amtrak boardings have been relocating from Santa Fe Depot to Old Town over the past two years.) Of the 74 California stations served by Amtrak, the Old Town Transit Center was the 25th-busiest in Fiscal Year 2013, boarding or detraining an average of approximately 372 passengers daily.

=== San Diego Trolley ===
Old Town Transit Center is also a light rail station on the San Diego Trolley's Green Line. This station originally served as that line's terminus, until a system realignment in September 2012 extended the Green Line though Old Town to downtown San Diego.

The Trolley's Mid-Coast extension that was completed in November 2021 extends to serve the University City area.

=== Bus service ===
Old Town also operates as a bus transit center for San Diego Metropolitan Transit System's routes 8, 9, 10, 28, 30, 35, 44, 83, 84X (SPAWAR Express), 88, and 105. There is an underground pedestrian tunnel linking bus terminals on both sides of the station with the trolley/train areas.

The station is also served by San Diego International Airport's SAN Flyer shuttle which operates every 20 to 25 minutes between the Old Town Transit Center, Terminal 1 and Terminal 2. The station also sees service from UC San Diego's Triton Transit Hillcrest Express, which connects passengers with the UC San Diego Medical Center, Hillcrest, University of San Diego shuttles, and FlixBus intercity motorcoaches.

== Station layout ==
On the east side of the station complex is a convenience store and bus bays which serve MTS Access, the SAN Flyer shuttle, and MTS bus routes 44, 83, 88, and 105. A bay for FlixBus/Greyhound buses is located across Congress Street at the entrance to the Old Town San Diego State Historic Park.

The rail facilities consist of four tracks with a combination of side and island platforms. Track 1 carries northbound San Diego Trolley service, with the Blue Line continuing toward UTC and the Green Line toward El Cajon. Track 2 carries southbound trolley service, with the Blue Line toward San Ysidro and the Green Line toward 12th & Imperial. Track 3 accommodates southbound Coaster commuter trains, Amtrak Pacific Surfliner intercity trains, and BNSF Railway freight services toward downtown San Diego. Track 4 serves the corresponding northbound Coaster, Pacific Surfliner, and BNSF operations.

Additional bus bays are located on the west side of the station, serving MTS routes 8, 9, 28, 30, and 35. A bay for route 10 is located inside the parking lot.

== See also ==
- List of San Diego Trolley stations
