= Mission San Diego station =

San Diego Trolley station

Mission San Diego
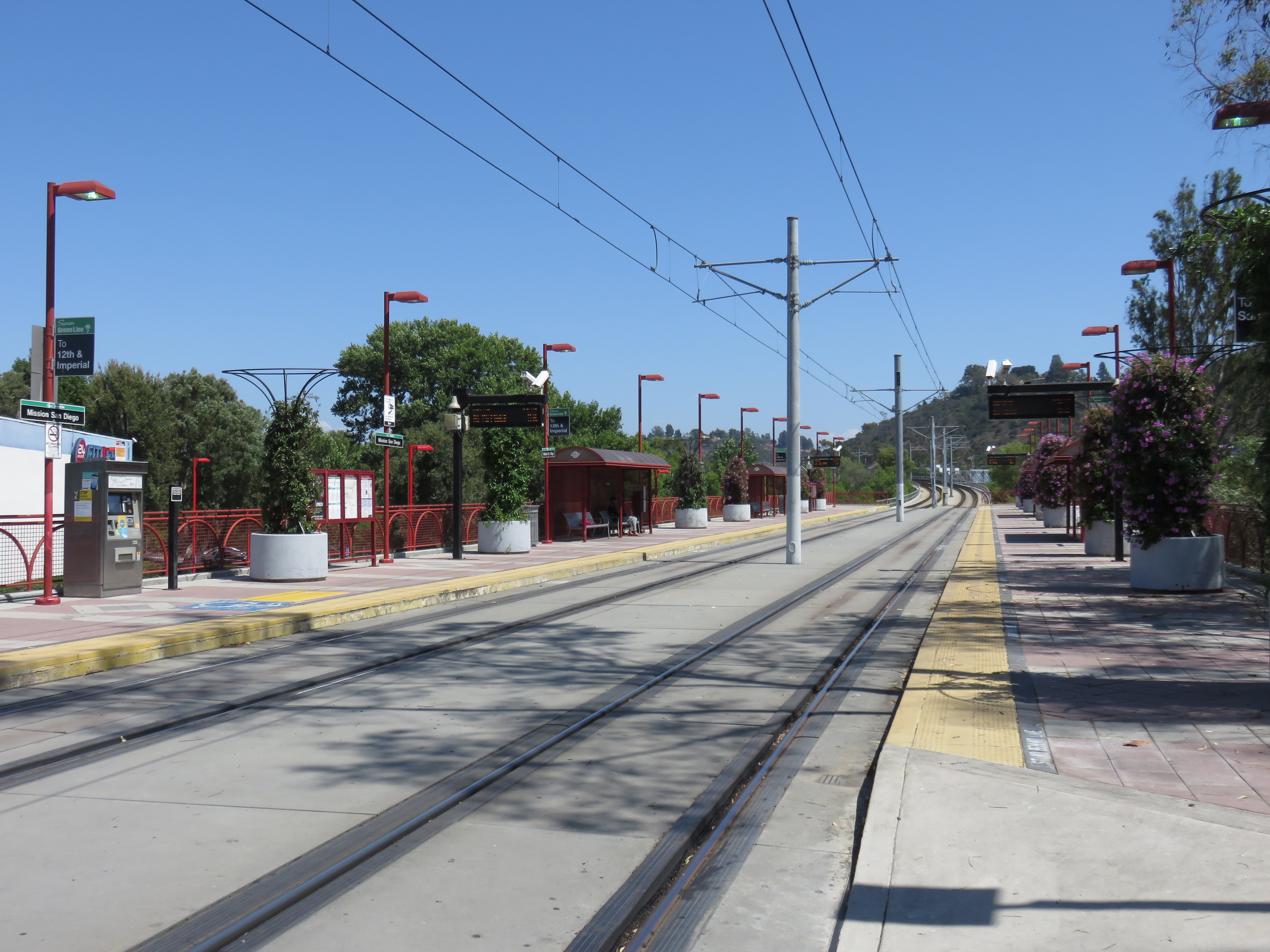
- Mission San Diego Station in 2019

General information
- Location: 5837 Rancho Mission Road; San Diego, California 92108
- Coordinates: 32°46′51.49″N 117°6′38.81″W
- Platforms: Side platform
- Connections: MTS: 14

Construction
- Structure type: Elevated
- Parking: Limited street parking
- Accessible: Yes

History
- Opened: November 1997
- Rebuilt: 2005

Services
Preceding station	San Diego Trolley	Following station
Stadium toward 12th & Imperial	Green Line	Grantville toward El Cajon
Former services
Preceding station	San Diego Trolley	Following station
Qualcomm Stadium toward San Ysidro	Blue Line 1997-2005	Terminus
Location

Mission San Diego station is a station on San Diego Trolley's Green Line. The elevated station has side platforms. It is located near the intersection of Rancho Mission and Ward Roads in the Grantville neighborhood. The station serves Mission San Diego de Alcalá and National University's San Diego campus.

From the station's opening in late 1997, this station was the former terminus for the Blue Line trolleys until the July 2005 introduction of the Green Line service, in conjunction with the opening of the Mission Valley East extension, pushed the Blue Line's terminus back to Old Town Transit Center.

With the Blue Line's truncation, all Green Line trolleys now serve the former portion of the Blue Line from Old Town to this station and points eastward. (A system redesign on September 2, 2012, truncated the Blue Line's terminus farther to America Plaza station and extended the Green Line's terminus from Old Town to 12th & Imperial Transit Center.)

== See also ==
- List of San Diego Trolley stations
