= Stadium station (San Diego) =

San Diego Trolley station

Stadium
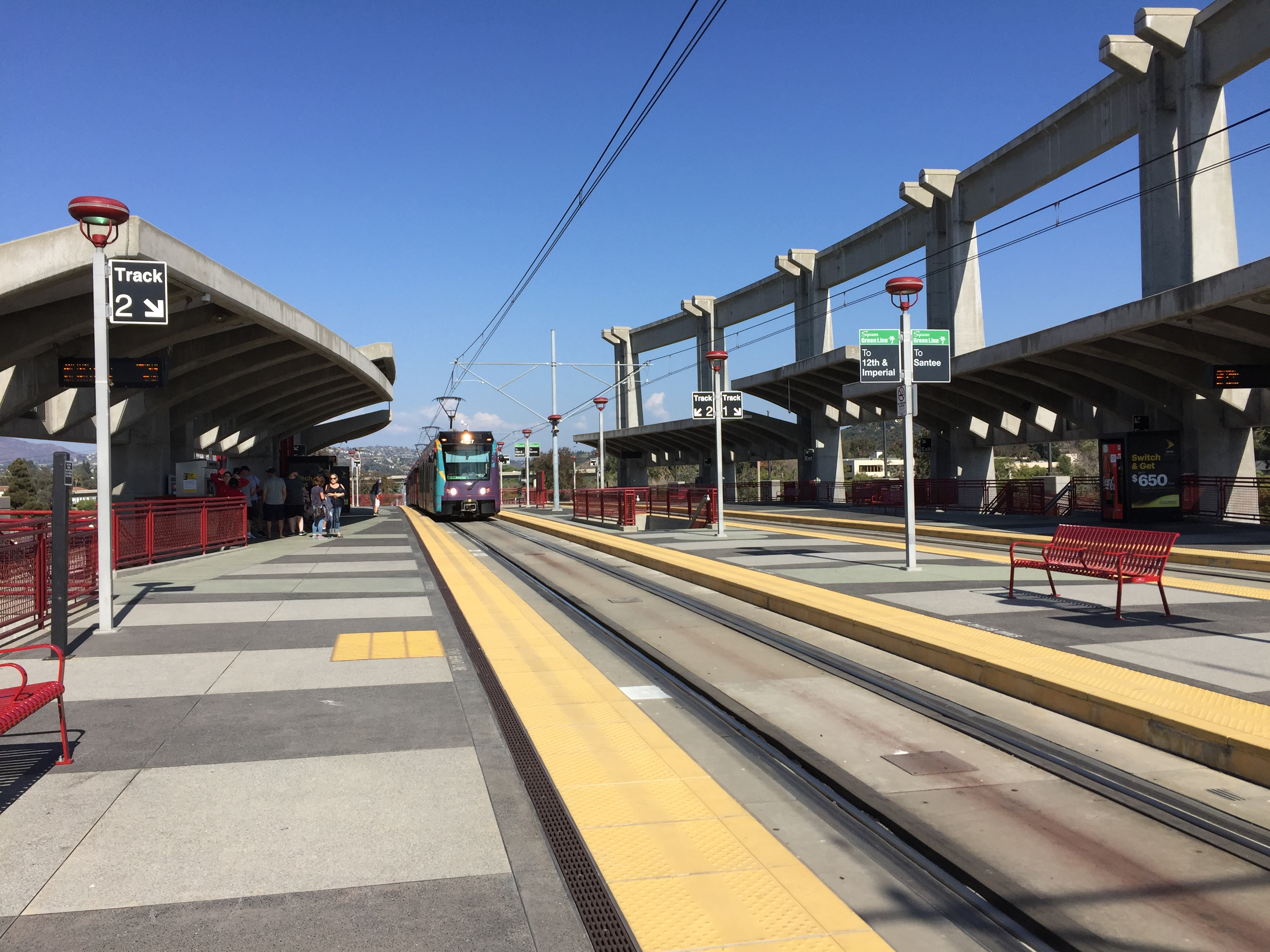
- Stadium station in 2019

General information
- Location: 9449 Friars Road; San Diego, California; United States
- Coordinates: 32°46′52″N 117°7′9″W
- Owner: San Diego Metropolitan Transit System
- Operator: San Diego Trolley
- Platforms: 2 side platforms, 1 island platform
- Tracks: 2

Construction
- Structure type: Elevated
- Accessible: Disabled access

History
- Opened: November 23, 1997
- Rebuilt: 2005
- Former names: Qualcomm Stadium (1997–2017)

Services
Preceding station	San Diego Trolley	Following station
Fenton Parkway toward 12th & Imperial	Green Line	Mission San Diego toward El Cajon
Former services
Preceding station	San Diego Trolley	Following station
Fenton Parkway toward San Ysidro	Blue Line 1997-2005	Mission San Diego Terminus
Fenton Parkway toward 12th & Imperial	Special Event Line pre-2012	Terminus
Location

Stadium station is a San Diego Trolley station on the Green Line. It is located on the campus of San Diego State University (SDSU) at SDSU Mission Valley, a noncontiguous campus expansion which contains Snapdragon Stadium. The station served the former San Diego Stadium until its closure in 2020. The elevated station has an island platform as well as side platforms.

== History ==
This station opened on November 23, 1997 as part of the Blue Line Mission Valley Line extension to Mission San Diego station. The station, originally called Qualcomm Stadium station, was built in the parking lot of its namesake stadium, the home of the National Football League’s San Diego Chargers. The station saw heavy use on stadium event days. On non-event days, the stadium parking lots served as a massive park and ride facility.

Blue Line service to this station was replaced by the Green Line on July 10, 2005 as part of the Mission Valley East extension. Before the opening of the Mission Valley East extension, this station was rebuilt to raise the platform to accommodate the new low-floor trolley vehicles, giving passengers level access to trains without using steps or a wheelchair lift.

The station was renamed after Qualcomm's naming rights to the stadium expired in June 2017, coinciding with the Chargers' departure from San Diego.

The station closed on November 1, 2020, for two years to accommodate the demolition of San Diego Stadium and the construction of Snapdragon Stadium. The station briefly reopened on August 20, 2022, for a preview event at the new stadium and reopened permanently on September 3, 2022. A new plaza was constructed as part of the renovations to the station.

== Station layout ==
There are two tracks, each served by a side platform and a shared island platform. East of the station is a siding for trains short-turning back to Downtown.

== See also ==
- List of San Diego Trolley stations
