= Blue Line (San Diego Trolley) =

Light rail line in San Diego County, California

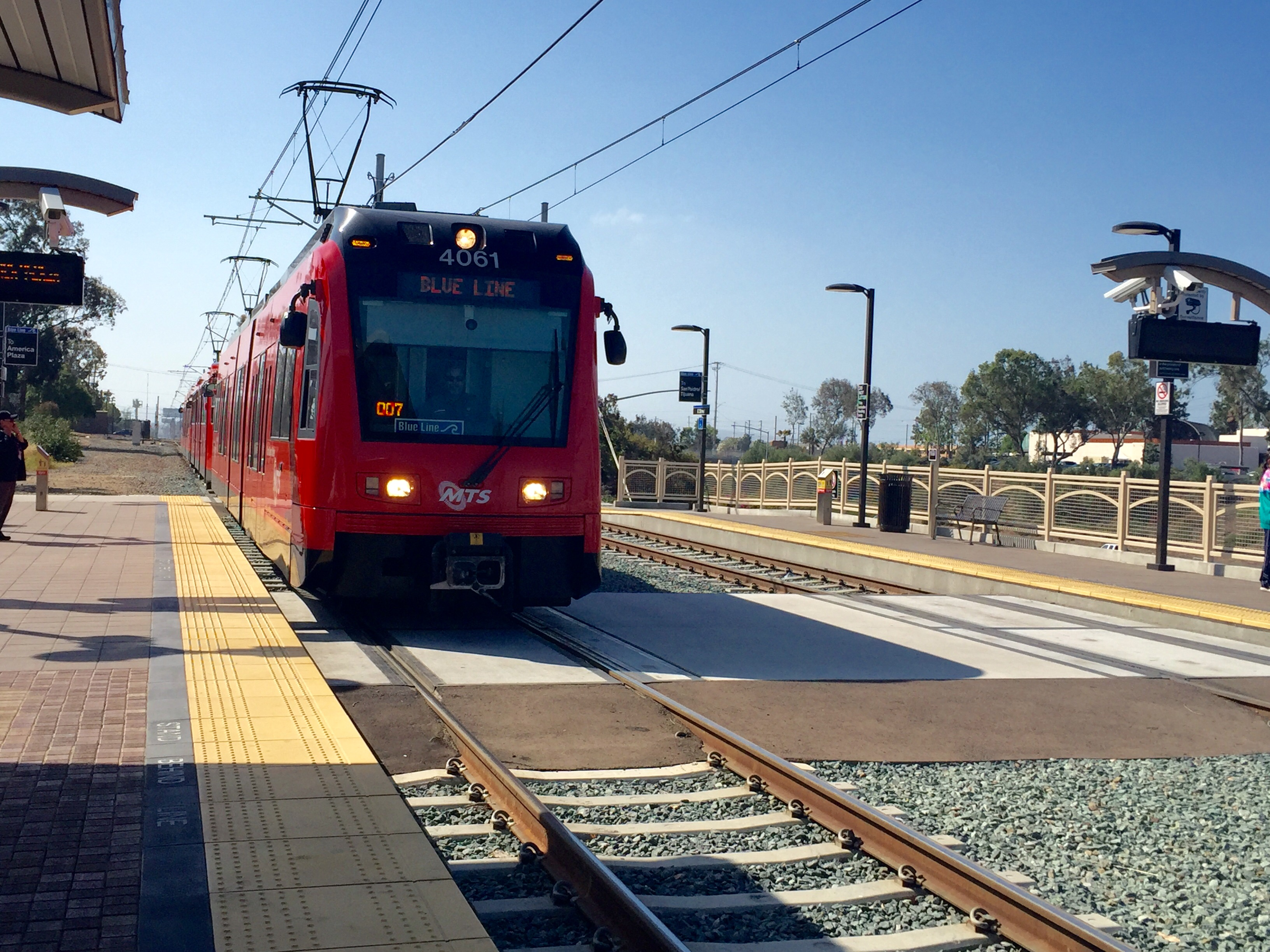
- Blue Line train at E Street station

Overview
- Other name: UC San Diego Blue Line
- Owner: San Diego Metropolitan Transit System
- Locale: San Diego, California
- Termini: UTC; San Ysidro
- Stations: 32
- Website: sdmts.com

Service
- Type: Light rail
- System: San Diego Trolley
- Route number: 510 (in internal documents only)
- Operator(s): San Diego Trolley, Inc.
- Rolling stock: 3 car trains
- Daily ridership: 77,400 (approx FY 2026)
- Ridership: 25,940,687 (FY 2026)

History
- Opened: July 26, 1981; 45 years ago

Technical
- Line length: 26.3 mi (42.3 km)
- Num of tracks: 2
- Track gauge: 4 ft 8 1/2 in (1,435 mm) standard gauge
- Electrification: Overhead line, 600 V DC
- Operating speed: 19 mph (31 km/h) (average) (Note: Calculated from the following: Route length (26.3 miles) divided by scheduled travel time (83 minutes).); 55 mph (89 km/h) (max)
Route map
Blue Line highlighted in blue

The Blue Line (officially the UC San Diego Blue Line for sponsorship purposes) is a 26.3-mile (42.3 km) light rail line in the San Diego Trolley system, operated by San Diego Trolley, Inc., an operating division of the San Diego Metropolitan Transit System (MTS). With an end-to-end travel time of one hour and twenty-three minutes, it operates between UTC Transit Center and San Ysidro Transit Center, the latter of which is at the Mexico–United States border directly adjacent to the San Ysidro Port of Entry, facilitating easy connections across the border. The line serves La Jolla, downtown San Diego, National City, Chula Vista, and San Ysidro and is the system's longest line.

The Blue Line is one of five lines in the trolley system, along with the Orange, Green, Copper, and Silver ("heritage weekend" service only) lines. Among them, the Blue Line has the highest ridership, transporting 24,389,986 total riders, or 75,160 per day, in fiscal year 2024. In Fiscal Year 2025, Blue Line ridership was recorded at 25,947,395 riders, reflecting a 1.06% increase from Fiscal Year 2024. Its sponsored name is due to a $30 million naming rights deal with UC San Diego Health. An extension to its namesake campus of the University of California, San Diego, as well as nine other stations, opened to revenue service on November 21, 2021.

== History ==
The initial line in the San Diego Trolley system, the Blue Line first opened between Centre City San Diego and San Ysidro on July 26, 1981, at a cost of $86 million (equivalent to $305 million in 2025), using the existing tracks of the San Diego and Arizona Eastern Railway, which the Metropolitan Transit Development Board had purchased from Southern Pacific on August 20, 1979, for $18.1 million (equivalent to $80 million in 2025).

In 1986, the line was named the South Line to differentiate it from the new East Line to Euclid Avenue, which later became the Orange Line. On July 2, 1992, the line was extended north from downtown with the opening of County Center/Little Italy station. It was renamed the North-South Line when the Old Town extension opened on June 16, 1996. The North-South Line was renamed the Blue Line in 1997, with the opening of the extension to Mission San Diego on November 23, 1997.

When the Green Line was brought into service in 2005, the Blue Line was cut back to Old Town Transit Center. At rush hours, however, some Blue Line trains continued onto Qualcomm Stadium; and from Qualcomm Stadium onto San Ysidro. On September 3, 2006, the rush hour service Blue line trains were discontinued entirely, due to duplication of service with Green Line service. All Blue Line trains then terminated at Old Town. Rush hour Blue Line trains operated from San Ysidro to America Plaza with some serving the Bayside.

Blue Line service also experienced some change in the stations served. The San Diego Square station located between 7th and 8th Avenues in downtown closed in 1986 due to low ridership and its close proximity to Fifth Avenue station. Later that year, E Street station in Chula Vista opened in October 1986, about five years after service already operated along the tracks served. At the same time, the Centre City station on C Street, between Sixth Avenue and Fifth Avenue, was renamed Fifth Avenue station. Fenton Parkway station was an 'infill' station that opened in 2000; however, it, like the rest of the stations on the route to Mission San Diego, is now only served by the Green Line.

=== 2012 realignment ===
During a system redesign which took effect on September 2, 2012, Blue Line service between America Plaza and Old Town was discontinued, making America Plaza the Blue Line's northern terminus. Blue Line trains traveled between America Plaza to San Ysidro on a regular 15 minute frequency, with a 7 1/2 minute frequency during weekday rush hours. Blue Line service to Old Town was reinstated once the Mid-Coast trolley extension to UC San Diego was completed. UC San Diego Health paid $30 million to rename the route the UC San Diego Blue Line in 2015.

=== Trolley Renewal Project ===
To accommodate the new Siemens S70 models and allow for their use on the line, the Blue Line stations needed to undergo renovation, although this was done over a period of five years to prevent the disruption of operation of the trolley. The project to renovate the stations, called the Trolley Renewal Project, began in fall 2010. After beginning operation on the Green Line in 2011 and on the Orange Line in 2013, low-floor Siemens S70 LRVs began operation on the Blue Line on January 27, 2015. Renovation of rail track and the final eleven Blue Line stations was completed in late 2015.

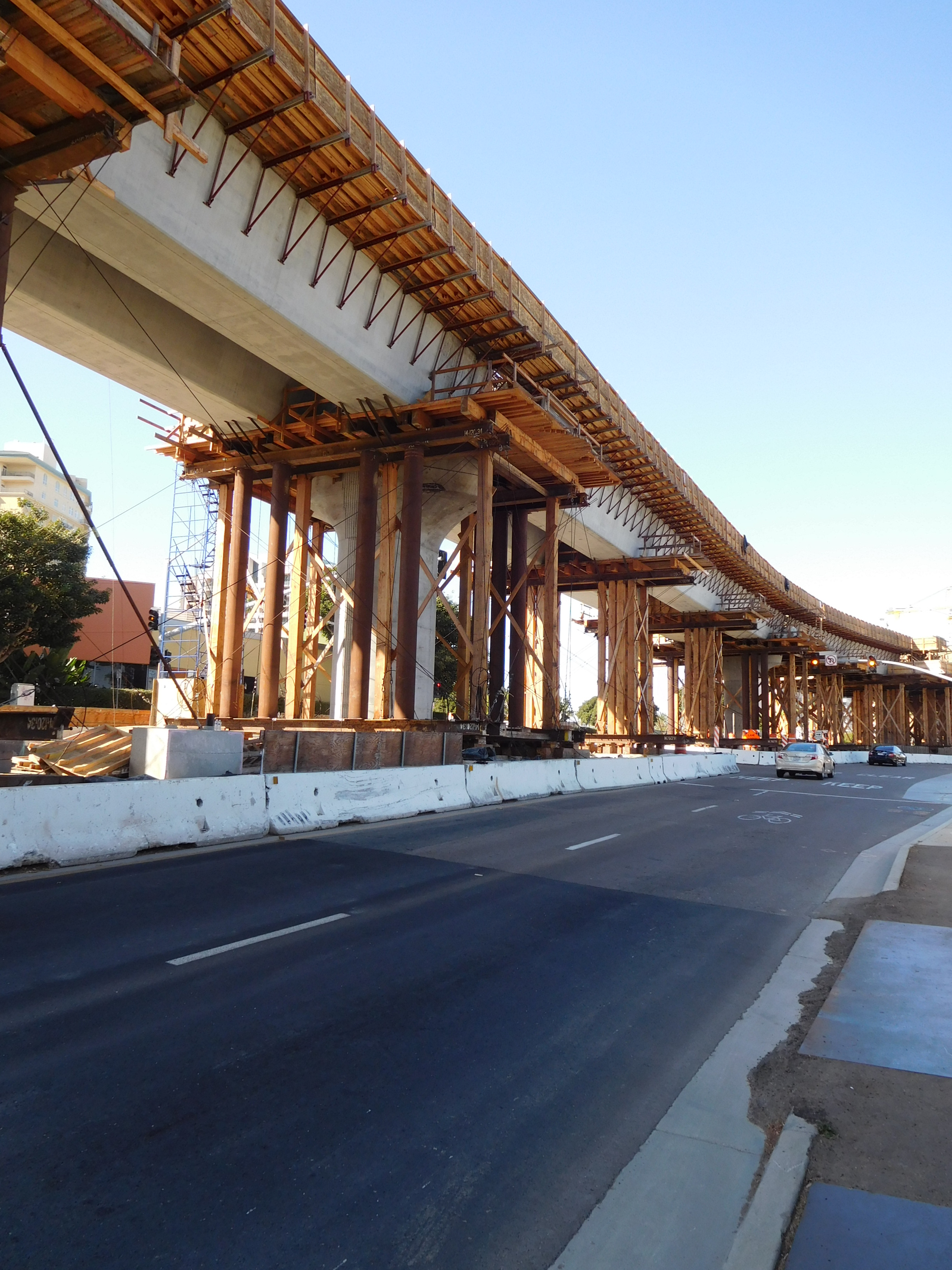
Construction of Mid-Coast extension viaduct above Genesee Avenue in 2019

=== Mid-Coast extension ===
The Mid-Coast Corridor Transit Project was an 10.9-mile (17.5 km) extension of the Blue Line from the Old Town Transit Center north to La Jolla Village, University of California, San Diego, and University City. Ridership is projected at 34,700 trips in 2030. The extension primarily follows the right-of-way of the Coaster and Interstate 5, with an elevated deviation around the UCSD area. MTS estimated construction costs of $2.1 billion. An aim of the extension is to decrease demand for parking on the UCSD campus while providing direct trolley access to Westfield UTC, a popular shopping mall. The existing SuperLoop BRT Shuttle (Routes 201/202) provides transit in and around the UTC area from the nearby trolley stations. Testing of the line began in June 2021, and it opened to revenue service on November 21, 2021, although alternate weekday and weekend late night Blue Line trips still short turn at America Plaza.

The Mid-Coast Corridor Transit Project was done in conjunction with the North Coast Corridor project, which upgrades the LOSSAN Corridor further to the north. Both projects build upon the original right-of-way of the Surf Line, which was built in the 1880s as the original railway from Los Angeles to San Diego.

=== Overnight Express bus ===
On January 26, 2025, the MTS established bus route 910, an "Overnight Express" bus operating on the southern section of the Blue Line from midnight to 5 A.M., when the Blue Line isn't running. Route 910 operates between Santa Fe Depot and San Ysidro Transit Center, with intermediate stops at the City College, 12th & Imperial, 24th Street, Palomar Street, and Iris Avenue transit centers.

== Stations ==
Station	Location	Connections
UTC	University City, San Diego	MTS: 30, 31, 41, 60, 105, Rapid 201, Rapid 202, Rapid 204, 921; NCTD: 101; Park and ride: 333 spaces, paid
Executive Drive	University City, San Diego	MTS: Rapid 204, Rapid 237, 921A, 979
UC San Diego Health La Jolla	University City, San Diego	UC San Diego Triton Transit: Health Campus Connector, Regents Express; FlixBus UC San Diego – La Jolla
UC San Diego Central Campus	La Jolla, San Diego	MTS: 985; UC San Diego Triton Transit: Inside Loop, Outside Loop, Regents Express
VA Medical Center	La Jolla, San Diego	
Nobel Drive	La Jolla, San Diego	MTS: 30, Rapid 201, Rapid 202; NCTD: 101; Park and ride: 289 spaces
Balboa Avenue	Bay Park, San Diego	MTS: 8, 27, 43; Park and ride: 227 spaces
Clairemont Drive	Bay Park, San Diego	MTS: 105
Tecolote Road	Morena, San Diego	Park and ride: 279 spaces
Old Town	Old Town, San Diego	Green Line; Pacific Surfliner; Coaster; MTS: 8, 9, 10, 28, 30, 35, 44, 83, 88, 105; (via) San Diego Flyer shuttle; Park and ride: 412 spaces
Washington Street	Mission Hills, San Diego	Green Line; MTS: 10
Middletown	Middletown, San Diego	Green Line; (via) TROLLEY → TERMINAL shuttle
County Center/Little Italy	Little Italy, San Diego	Green Line
Santa Fe Depot (Note: Starting point for one early-morning northbound trolley on weekends.)	Core, San Diego	Green Line; Pacific Surfliner; Coaster; MTS: 83, Rapid 215, Rapid 225, Rapid 235, Rapid Express 280, Rapid Express 290, 910 (Overnight Express), 923, 992
America Plaza (Note: Northbound terminus for approximately half of the Blue Line trains.)	Core, San Diego	Silver Line; MTS: 83, Rapid 215, Rapid 225, Rapid 235, Rapid Express 280, Rapid Express 290, 923, 992
Civic Center	Core, San Diego	Orange Line Silver Line
Fifth Avenue	Core, San Diego	Orange Line Silver Line; MTS: 3, 120
City College	East Village, San Diego	Orange Line Silver Line; MTS: 2, 5, 7, 12, 20, 110, Rapid 215, Rapid 225, Rapid 235, Rapid Express 280, Rapid Express 290, 910 (Overnight Express), 992
Park & Market	East Village, San Diego	Orange Line Silver Line; MTS: 3, 5
12th & Imperial (Note: Starting point for two early-morning northbound trolleys, and terminus for two southbound late-night trolleys.)	East Village, San Diego	Green Line Orange Line Silver Line; MTS: 4, 12, 901, 910 (Overnight Express), 929; Greyhound Lines; Park and ride: 1,020 spaces, paid
Barrio Logan (Note: Starting point for 5 early-morning southbound trolleys on weekdays, and three early-morning southbound trolleys on weekends.)	Logan Heights, San Diego	
Harborside	Logan Heights, San Diego	
Pacific Fleet	Naval Base San Diego	
8th Street	National City	MTS: 932, 955, 962, 963, 968; Park and ride: 123 spaces
24th Street	National City	MTS: 13, 910 (Overnight Express), 961, 967; Park and ride: 156 spaces
E Street	Chula Vista	MTS: 704, 705, 932; Living Coast Discovery Center shuttle; Park and ride: 267 spaces
H Street	Chula Vista	MTS: 701, 709; Park and ride: 295 spaces
Palomar Street	Chula Vista	MTS: 701, 704, 712, 910 (Overnight Express); Park and ride: 305 spaces
Palm Avenue	Palm City, San Diego	MTS: 932, 933, 934; Park and ride: 499 spaces
Iris Avenue	Otay Mesa West, San Diego	MTS: Rapid 227, 901, 905, 906, 907, 910 (Overnight Express), 929, 932, 933, 934; Park and ride: 192 spaces
Beyer Blvd.	San Ysidro, San Diego	MTS: 906, 907; Park and ride: 131 spaces
San Ysidro	San Ysidro, San Diego	MTS: 906, 907, 910 (Overnight Express)

== Future ==
=== Cross-Border Trolley (proposed) ===
Although the current Blue Line ends at San Ysidro Transit Center, just north of the Mexico–United States border, future plans for the Blue Line to continue into Tijuana are awaiting approval. If it is to be made, the Blue Line would be extended 1 or 1.5 miles (1.6 or 2.4 km) on elevated trackage into a new Tijuana station. This proposal for a "Cross-Border Trolley", supported by SANDAG and officials in Baja California, could take eight years to complete.
