= Boulevard Transit Plaza =

Bus rapid transit station in San Diego, California

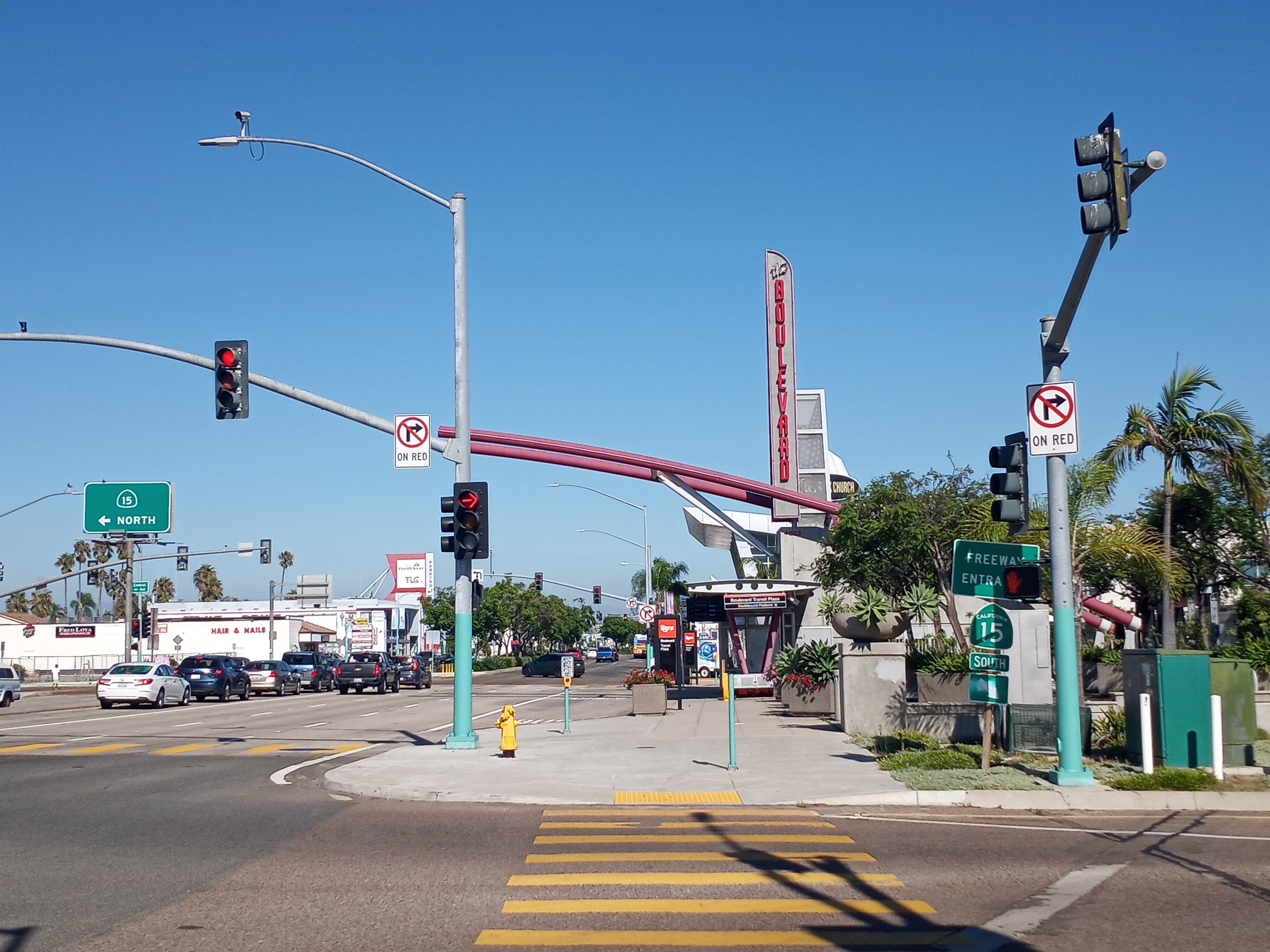
- Boulevard Transit Plaza, street-level platforms

General information
- Location: 4024 El Cajon Boulevard; San Diego, California; United States
- Coordinates: 32°45′19″N 117°06′32″W
- Operator: San Diego Metropolitan Transit System
- Platforms: 4 side platforms
- Connections: MTS: 1, 60

Construction
- Structure type: Freeway median (I-15 CenterLine); At-grade
- Cycle facilities: 8 lockers
- Accessible: Yes

History
- Opened: March 11, 2018

Services
Preceding station	Rapid	Following station
35th Street toward Santa Fe Depot	Rapid 215	43rd Street toward SDSU
City Heights toward Santa Fe Depot	Rapid 235	Ruffin Road toward Escondido
Location

Boulevard Transit Plaza is a bus rapid transit station in the City Heights district of San Diego located at the intersection of El Cajon Boulevard and California State Route 15. The street-level platforms are served by Rapid 215, while the freeway-level platforms are served by Rapid 235. Local service is also provided by MTS route 1 at the street-level platforms and express route 60 at the freeway ramps.

Prior to the Transit Plaza, the Rapid 235 served the intersection using bus stops at freeway ramps. Rapid 215 buses later began serving the station after service began in 2014. In March 2018, Boulevard Transit Plaza officially opened, featuring new freeway-level "CenterLine" platforms in the median of the SR-15 below to speed up service and provide a more "train-like experience." Similar platforms were added at City Heights Transit Plaza south along SR-15.
