= City Heights Transit Plaza =

Bus rapid transit station in San Diego, California

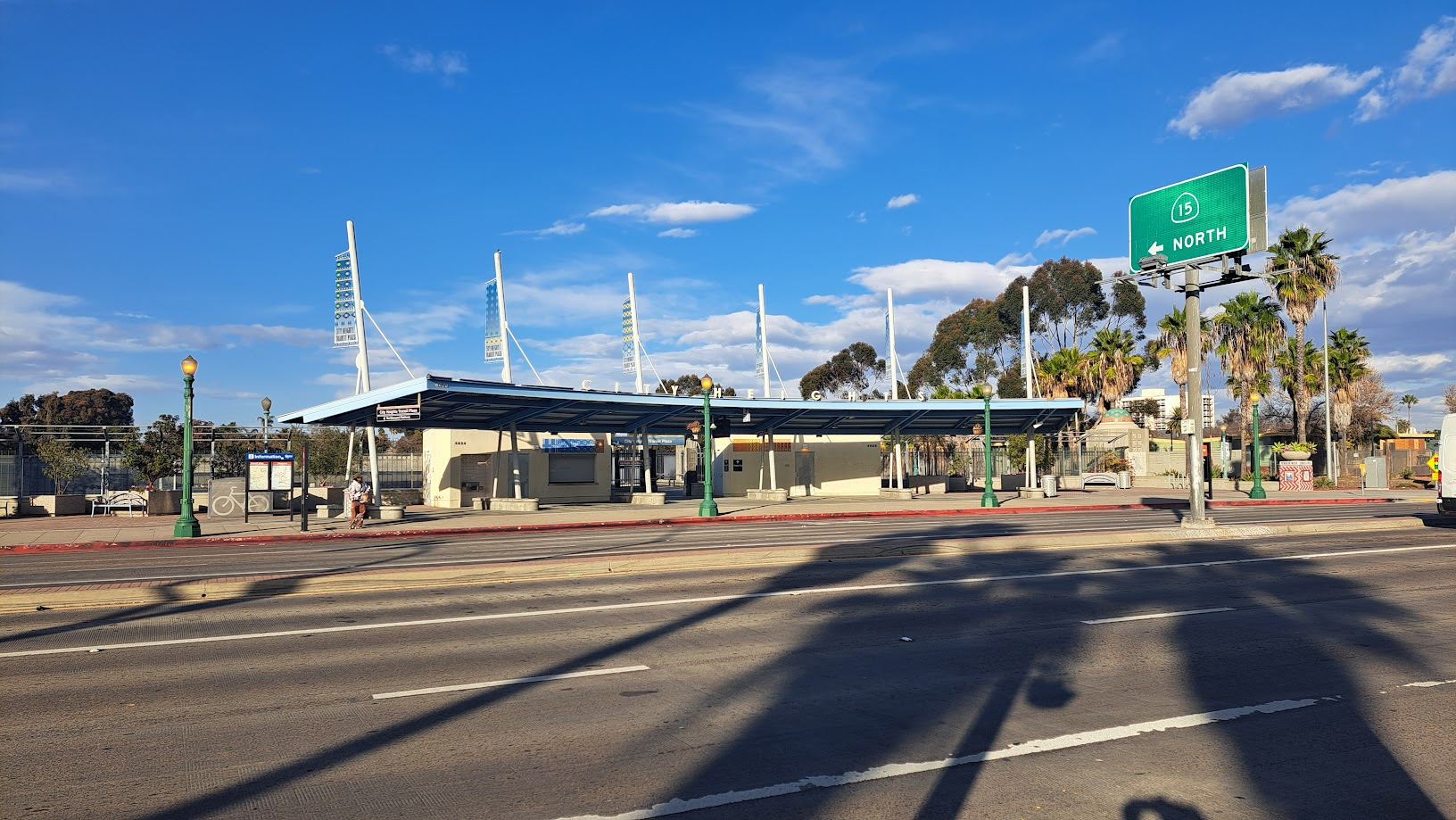
- City Heights Transit Plaza, street-level platforms

General information
- Location: 4024 University Avenue; San Diego, California; United States
- Coordinates: 32°44′59″N 117°06′32″W
- Operator: San Diego Metropolitan Transit System
- Platforms: 4 side platforms
- Connections: MTS: 7, 10, 60, 965

Construction
- Structure type: Freeway median (I-15 CenterLine); At-grade
- Cycle facilities: 8 lockers
- Accessible: Yes

History
- Opened: March 11, 2018

Services
| Preceding station | Rapid | Following station |
|---|---|---|
| City College toward Santa Fe Depot | Rapid 235 | El Cajon Boulevard toward Escondido |
Location

City Heights Transit Plaza is a bus rapid transit station in the City Heights district of San Diego located at the intersection of University Avenue and California State Route 15. It is a station on Rapid 235, which serves the station at freeway-level platforms. The street-level platforms are served by route 7, 10, and 965. Express route 60 stops at the freeway ramps.

The station officially opened in March 2018 alongside Boulevard Transit Plaza. Both stations featured new freeway-level "CenterLine" platforms in the median of the SR-15 below to speed up service and provide a more "train-like experience."
