= 24th Street station (San Diego Trolley) =

San Diego Trolley station

24th Street
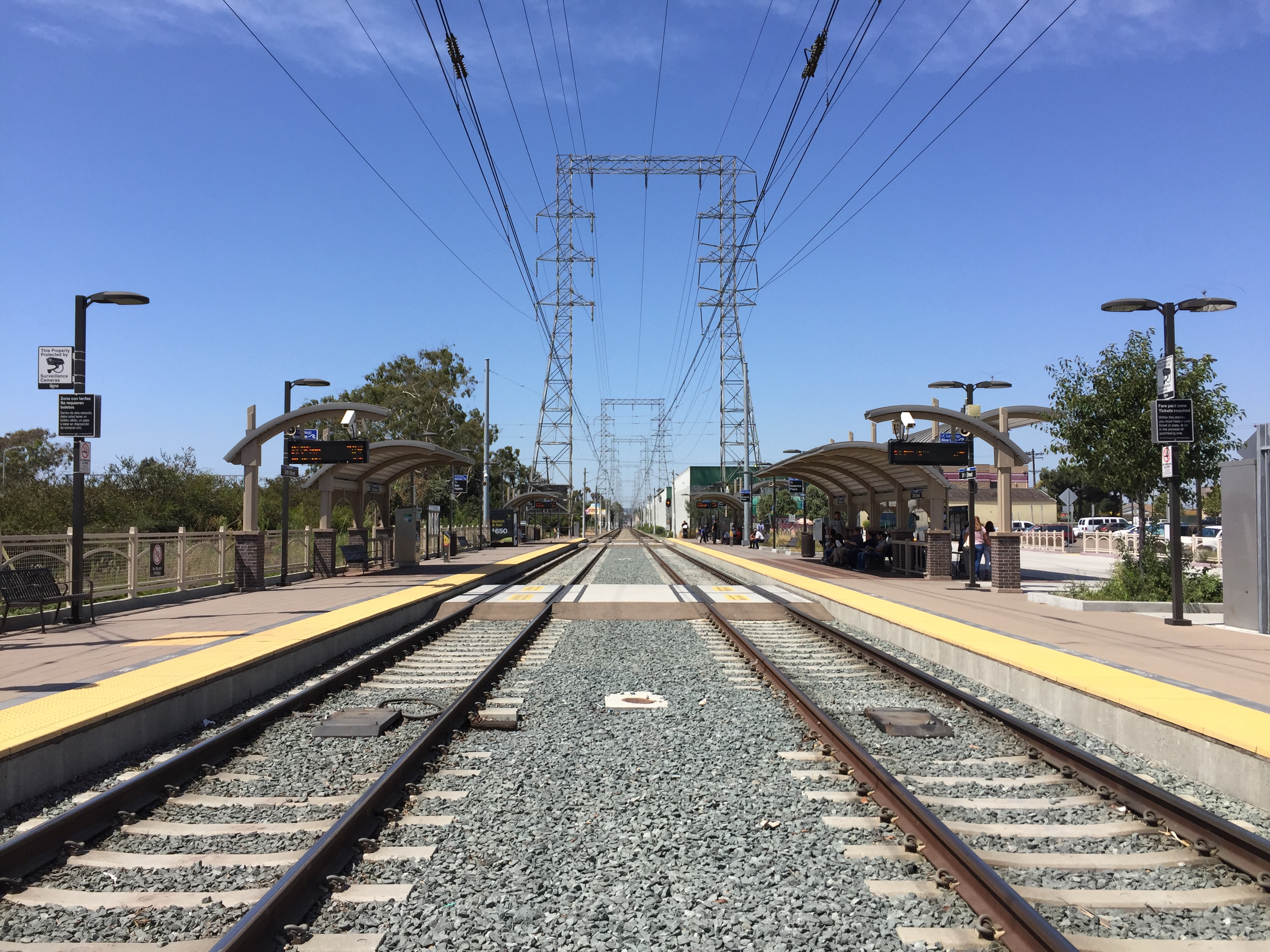
- 24th Street station platforms in 2019

General information
- Location: 506 West 22nd Street; National City, California; United States
- Coordinates: 32°39′44″N 117°06′27″W
- Owner: San Diego Metropolitan Transit System
- Operator: San Diego Trolley
- Line: SD&AE Main Line
- Platforms: 2 side platforms
- Tracks: 2
- Connections: MTS: 13, 910 (Overnight Express), 961, 967

Construction
- Structure type: At-grade
- Parking: 156 spaces
- Cycle facilities: 8 rack spaces, 2 lockers
- Accessible: Disabled access

Other information
- Station code: 75014, 75015

History
- Opened: July 26, 1981
- Rebuilt: 2014

Services
Preceding station	San Diego Trolley	Following station
8th Street toward UTC	Blue Line	E Street toward San Ysidro
Location

24th Street station is a station on the Blue Line of the San Diego Trolley at the intersection of Wilson Avenue and 22nd Street, north of Mile of Cars Way (formerly a part of 24th Street), in National City, California. The stop serves both as a commuter center with a park and ride lot and to provide access to the dense nearby retail area.

== History ==
24th Street opened as part of the initial 15.9-mile (25.6 km) "South Line" of the San Diego Trolley system on July 26, 1981, operating from San Ysidro north to downtown San Diego using the main line tracks of the San Diego and Arizona Eastern Railway.

This station was renovated, starting January 13, 2014 as part of the Trolley Renewal Project; it reopened with a renovated station platform in September 2014.

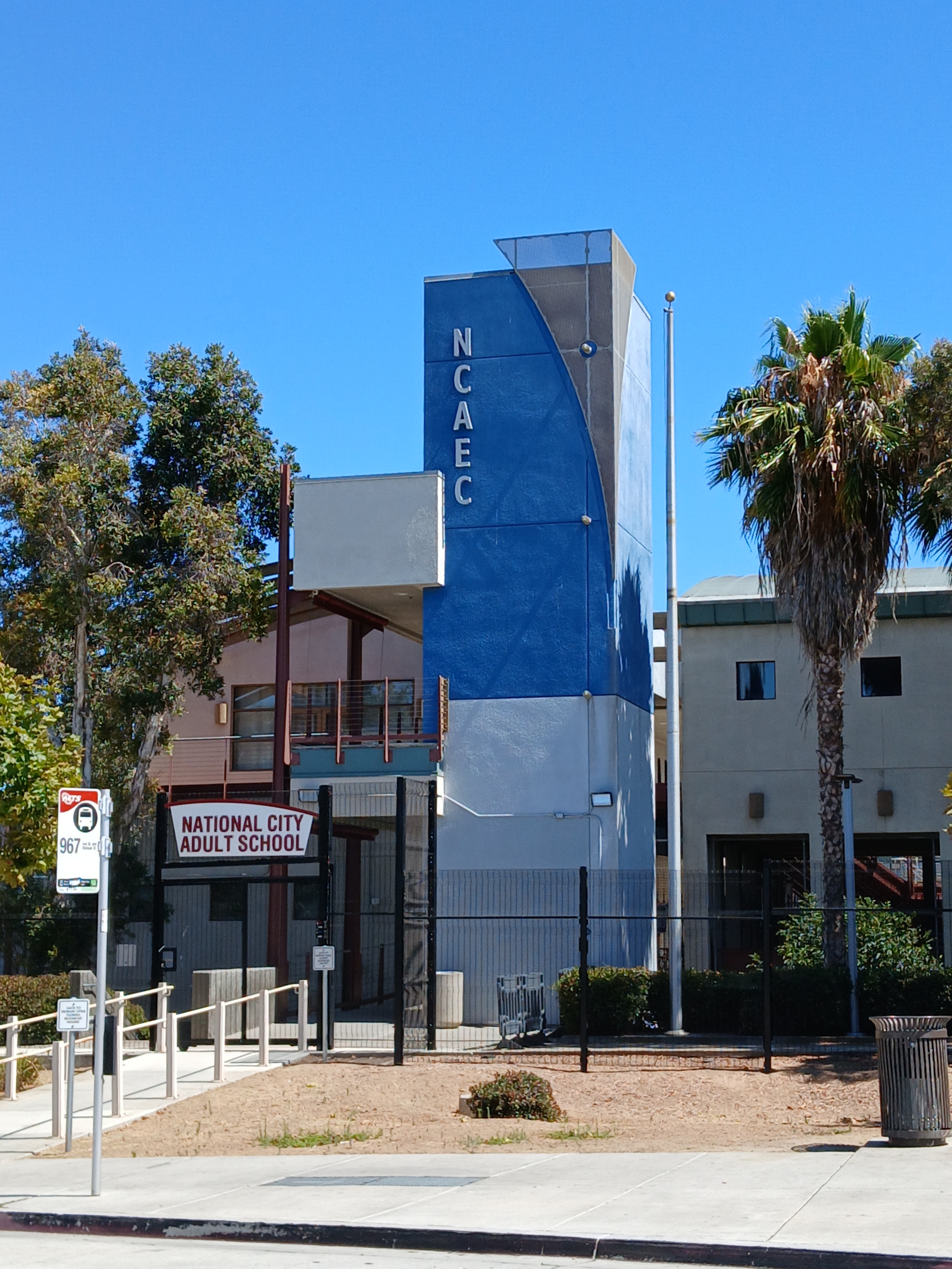
The National City Adult School is part of the Sweetwater Union High School District.

== See also ==
- List of San Diego Trolley stations
