= College Area, San Diego =

- Community of San Diego
- College Area
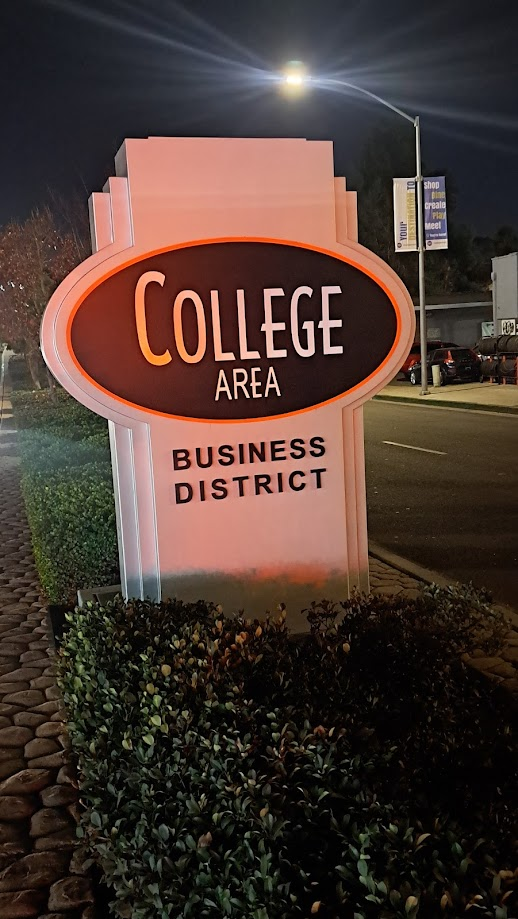
- El Cajon Boulevard

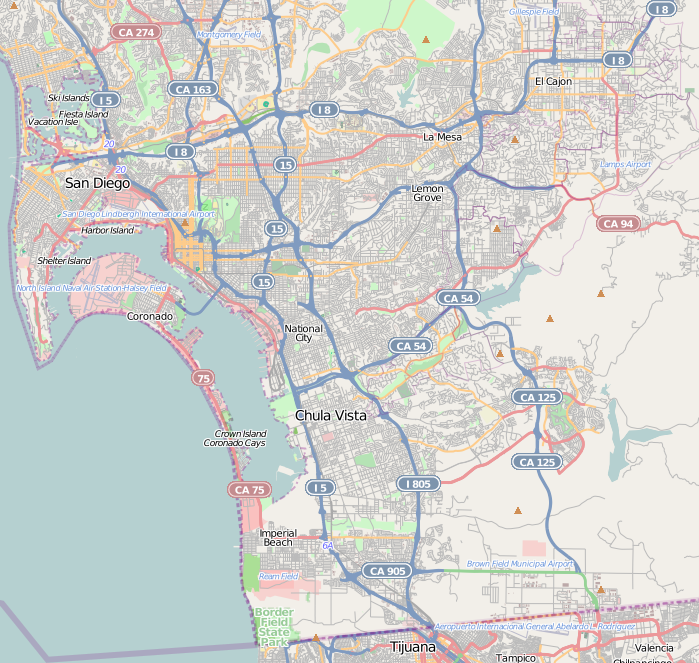
- Location within San Diego
- Coordinates: 32.771831°N 117.068939°W
- Country: United States of America
- State: California
- County: San Diego
- City: San Diego

The College Area is a residential community in the Mid-City region of San Diego, California, United States. It is dominated by San Diego State University (SDSU), after which the area is named. Several neighborhoods in the College Area were developed in the 1930s, with others becoming established in the post-war period.

The College Area is bordered to the west by Kensington and Talmadge and to the east by the city of La Mesa. It includes the neighborhoods of the Catoctin Area, Dennstedt Point, East Falls View Drive, Saranac-Mohawk, and an Orthodox Jewish neighborhood near Congregation Beth Jacob Orthodox Synagogue.

El Cajon Boulevard is a busy shopping district; additional retail establishments are at South Campus Plaza, a university housing and commercial complex on College Avenue. The region includes East Campus Medical Center at UC San Diego Health, a 306-bed acute care facility, and the College-Rolando branch of the San Diego Public Library.

== History ==
On August 18, 1948, the "Campus Drive-In" movie theater with a capacity for 900 cars was built at the intersection of College Avenue and El Cajon Boulevard. The opening night films were Give My Regards to Broadway and The Kansan. The final two features in 1983 were The Dark Crystal and Dragonslayer.

In 1951, Robert O. Peterson opened the first Jack in the Box at 63rd Street and El Cajon Boulevard, pioneering the concept of a drive-thru restaurant with a two-way intercom.

In 1961, snack-bar employee Tom O'Leary was convicted of manslaughter for stabbing a patron named Dennis O'Connor to death at the drive-in. The O'Connor family sued the company for wrongful death but did not prevail. The dead man's family became active in city politics and eventually his sister Maureen O'Connor was elected mayor of San Diego in 1986.

Three neon drum majorettes wearing Indian headdresses from the Drive-In are preserved in the Vons shopping center at this location and one large one is preserved in the College Grove Shopping Center further south on College Avenue in Oak Park.

On October 31, 2024, an urban wildfire in a gorge along Montezuma Avenue damaged six homes and prompeted evacuations and school closings.

== Geography ==
The College Area lies on a plateau known as Montezuma Mesa which overlooks Interstate 8. The neighborhood's borders are defined by Montezuma Road/Collwood Boulevard to the southwest, Interstate 8 to the north, 73rd Street to the east, and El Cajon Boulevard to the south. A large canyon opens up in the center of the SDSU campus known as Aztec Bowl and descends toward Alvarado Creek in Mission Valley. Canyon Crest Drive snakes down through the canyon from 55th Street to College Avenue.

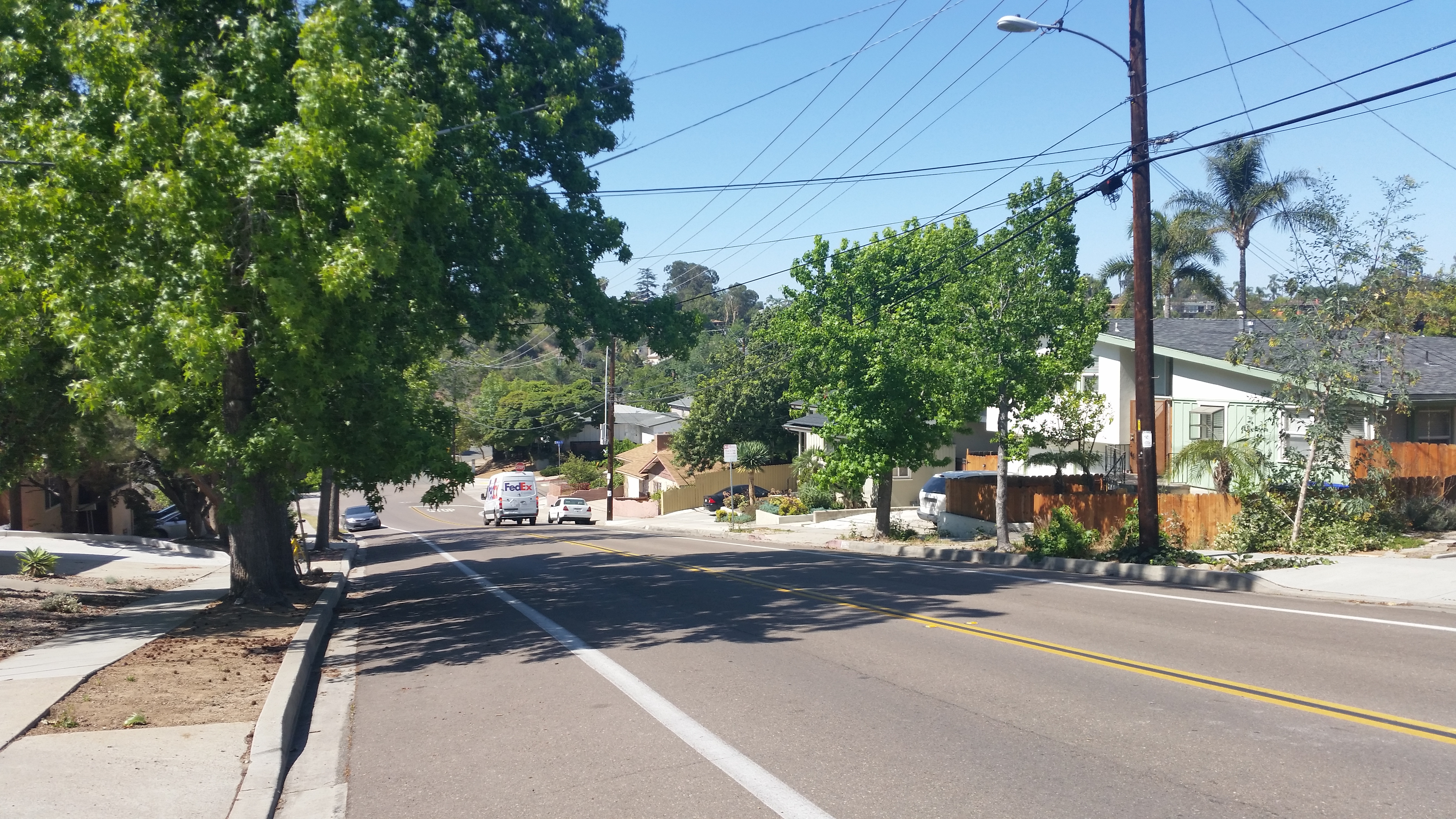
Campanile Drive

== Transportation ==
MTS (Metropolitan Transit System) operates the San Diego Trolley to SDSU Transit Center and UC San Diego Health East station, both of which are in the College Area. The trolley station at SDSU, as well as a bus plaza, make up the SDSU Transit Center. Transfers are made from the SDSU trolley subway station located at the Transit Center, underneath the bus plaza. Riders can go up to the bus plaza via elevator or stairs.

As of October 12, 2014, the SDSU Transit Center serves as the starting point for MTS Rapid Bus Route 215. A high-frequency, limited-stop service runs between San Diego State University and downtown San Diego via El Cajon Boulevard and Park Boulevard.

== Education ==
The College Area is home to one traditional elementary school, one private K-8 school, two alternative K-8 schools, and SDSU.

=== Elementary schools ===
- Hardy (San Diego Unified School District)

=== K through 8 ===
- Blessed Sacrament Parish School

=== K through 12 ===
- San Diego Unified School District
  - Language Academy
  - Tubman Village Charter

=== Colleges and universities ===
- San Diego State University
- Platt College (1879-2023)

== Gallery ==
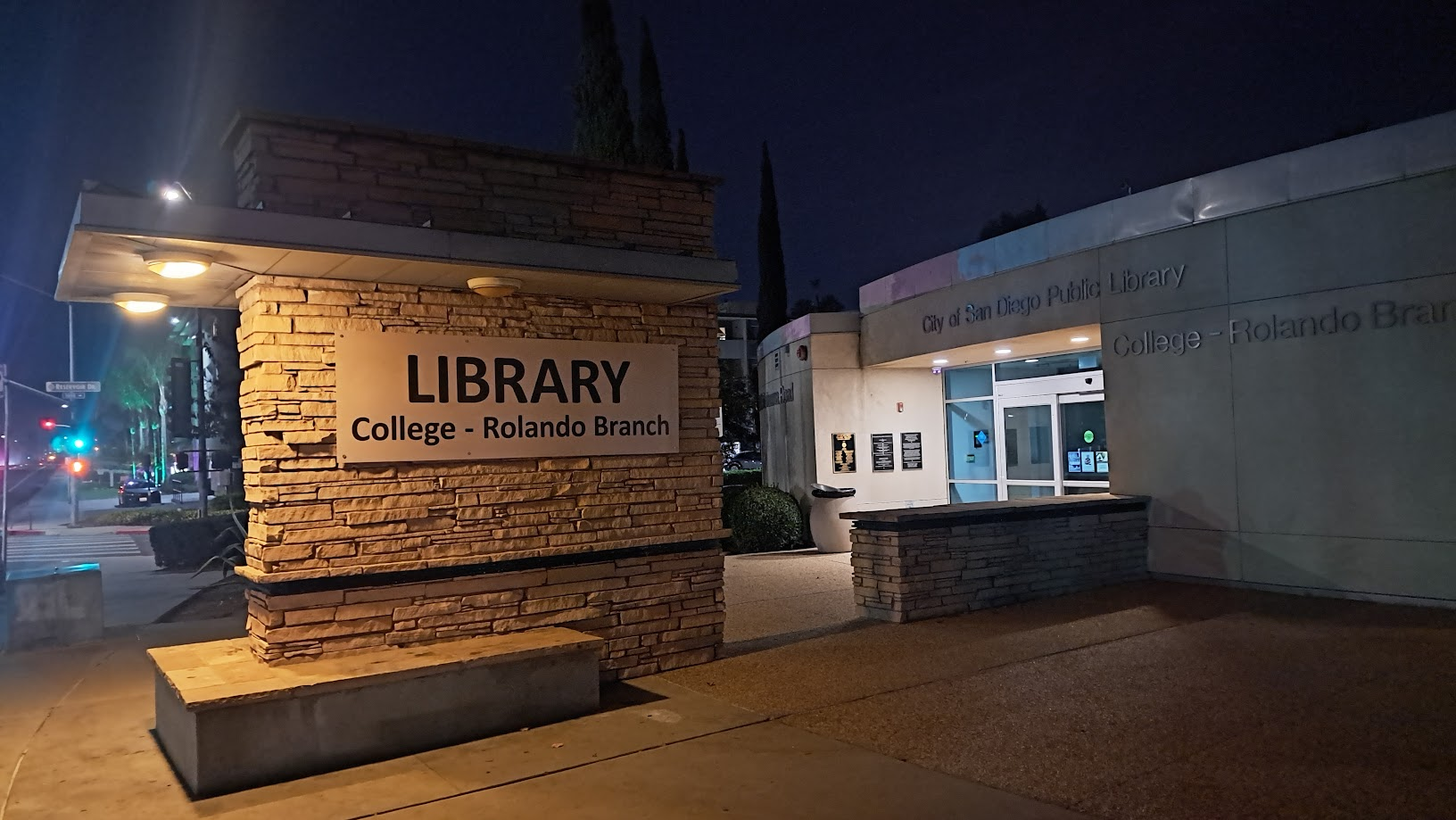
College-Rolando Branch, San Diego Public Library, 6600 Montezuma Road

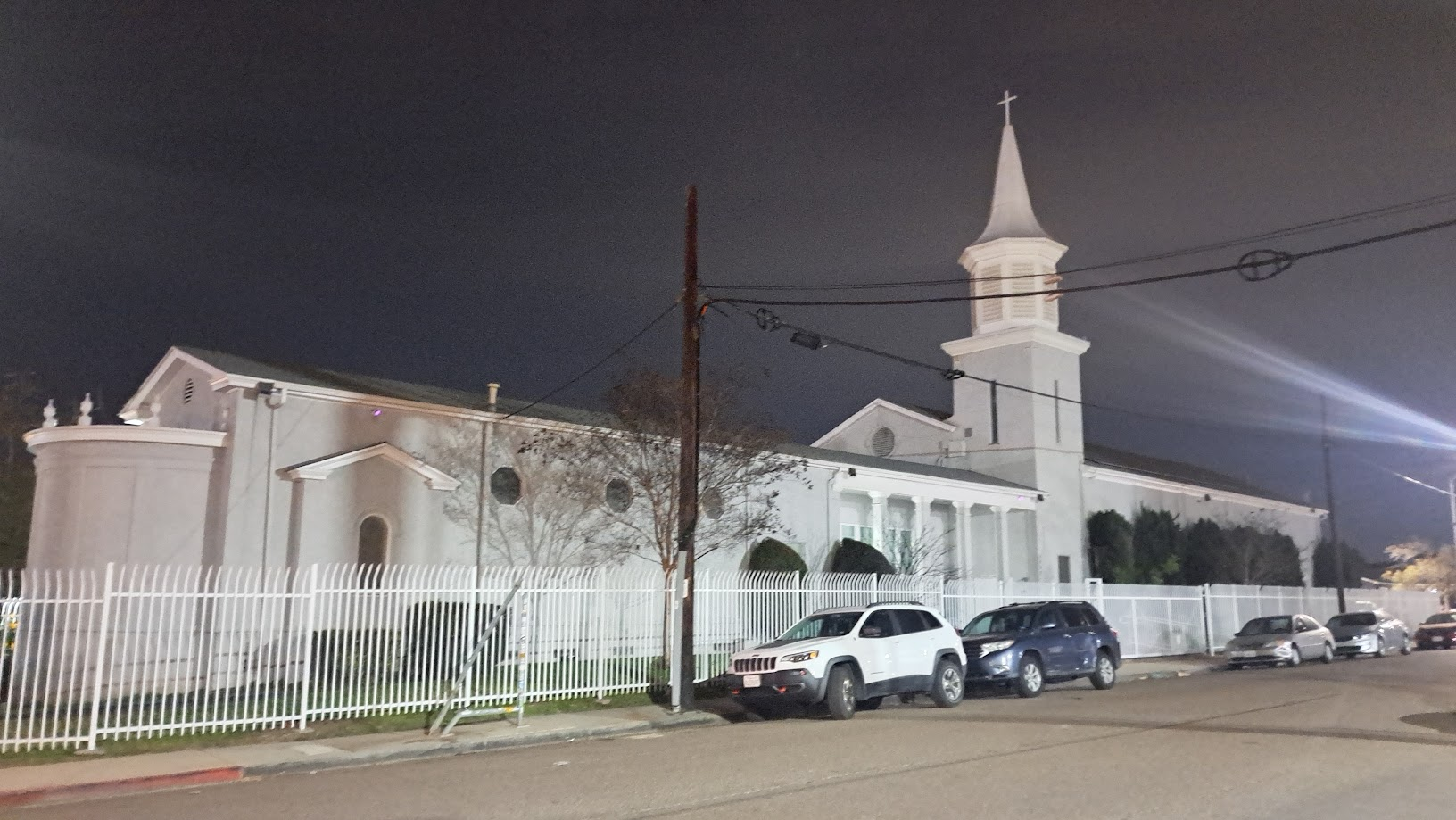
United Domestic Workers of America, UDW/AFSCME Local 3930, 4855 Seminole Drive

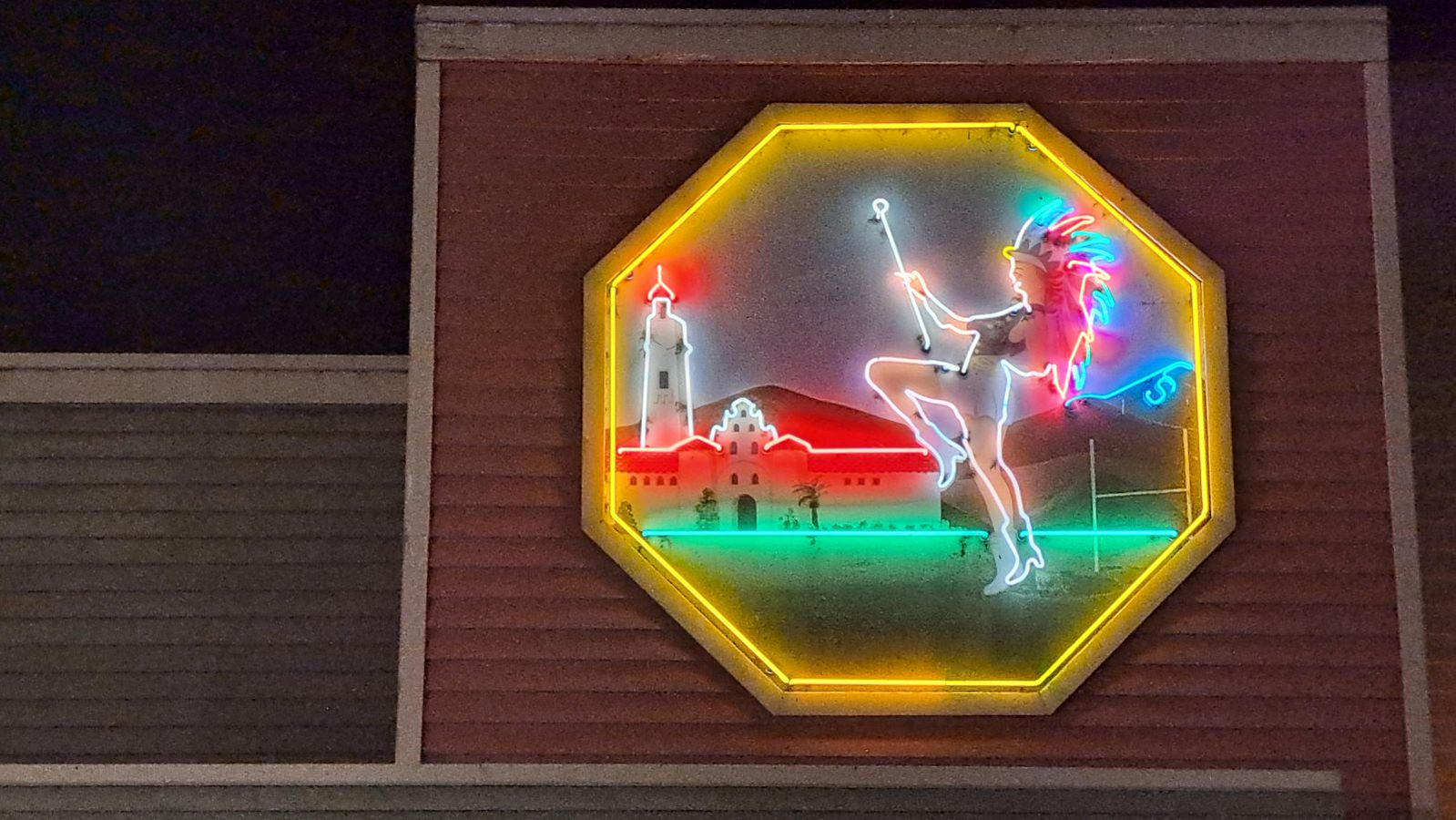
Preserved Neon Majorette (2023)

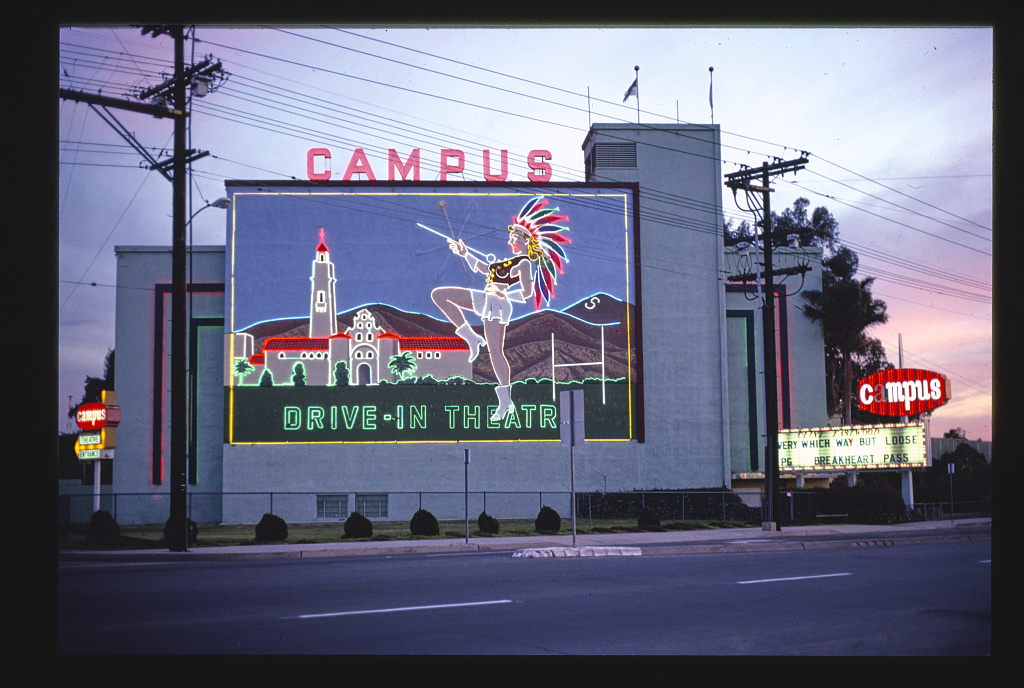
Historic Campus Drive-In (1979)

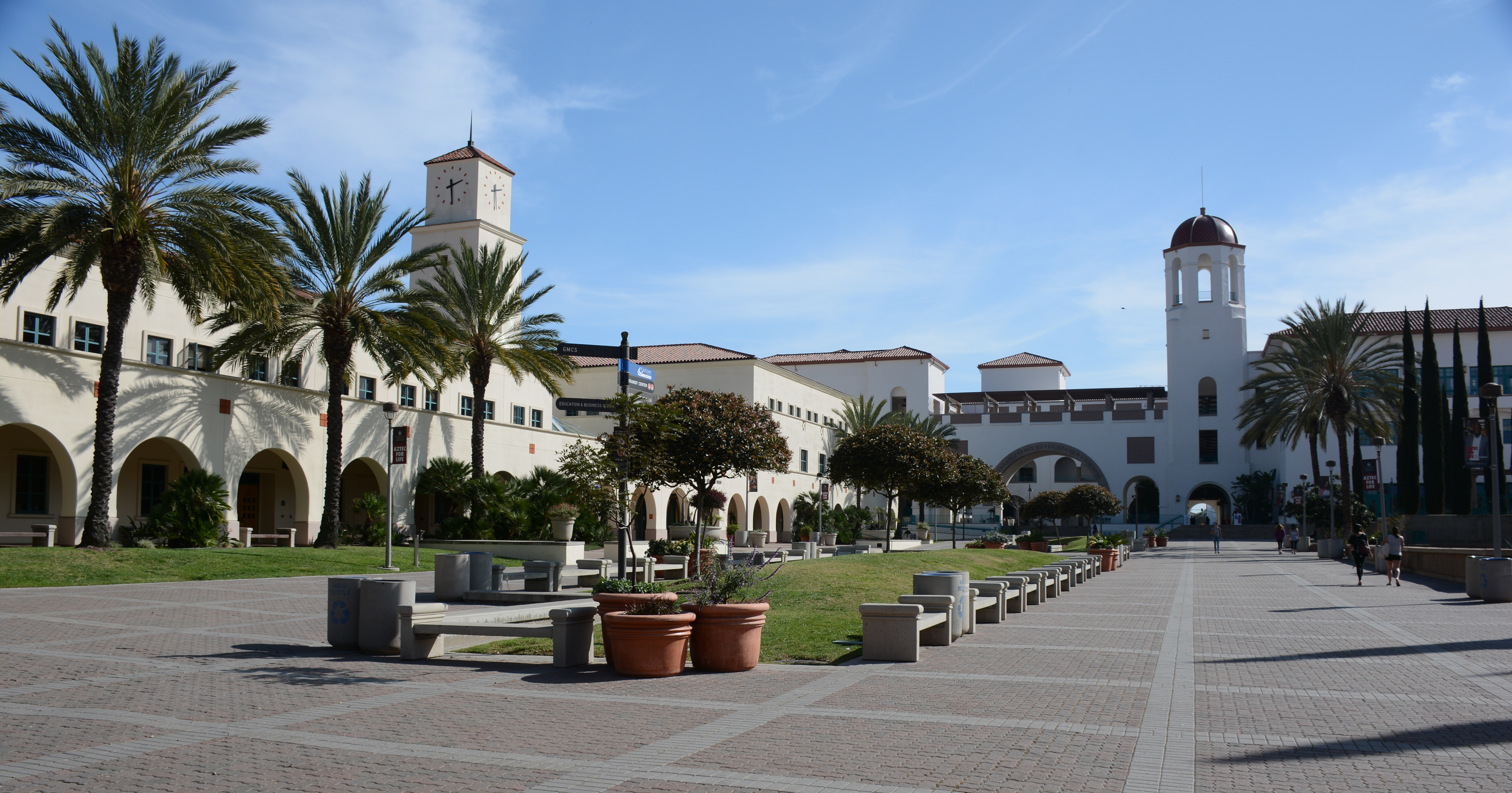
San Diego State University, College West

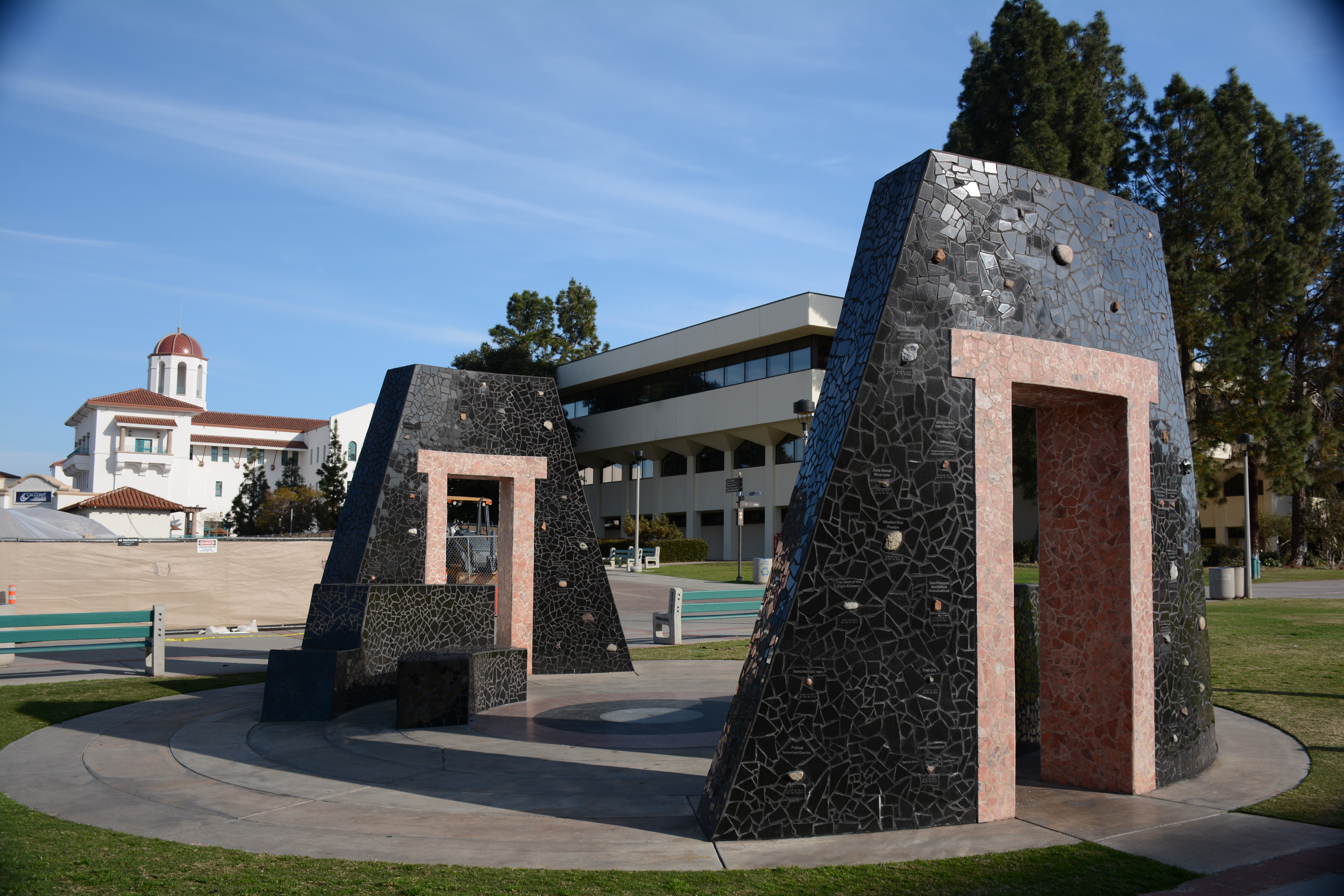
San Diego State University, College West

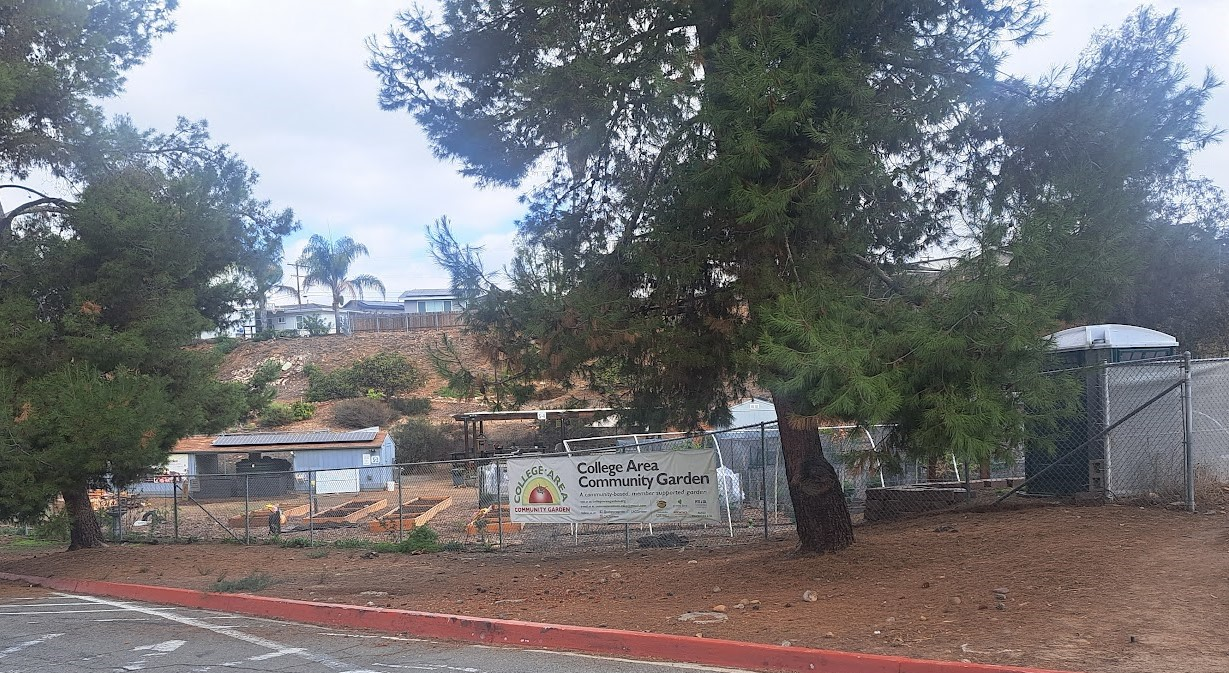
College Area Community Garden, Zura Wy

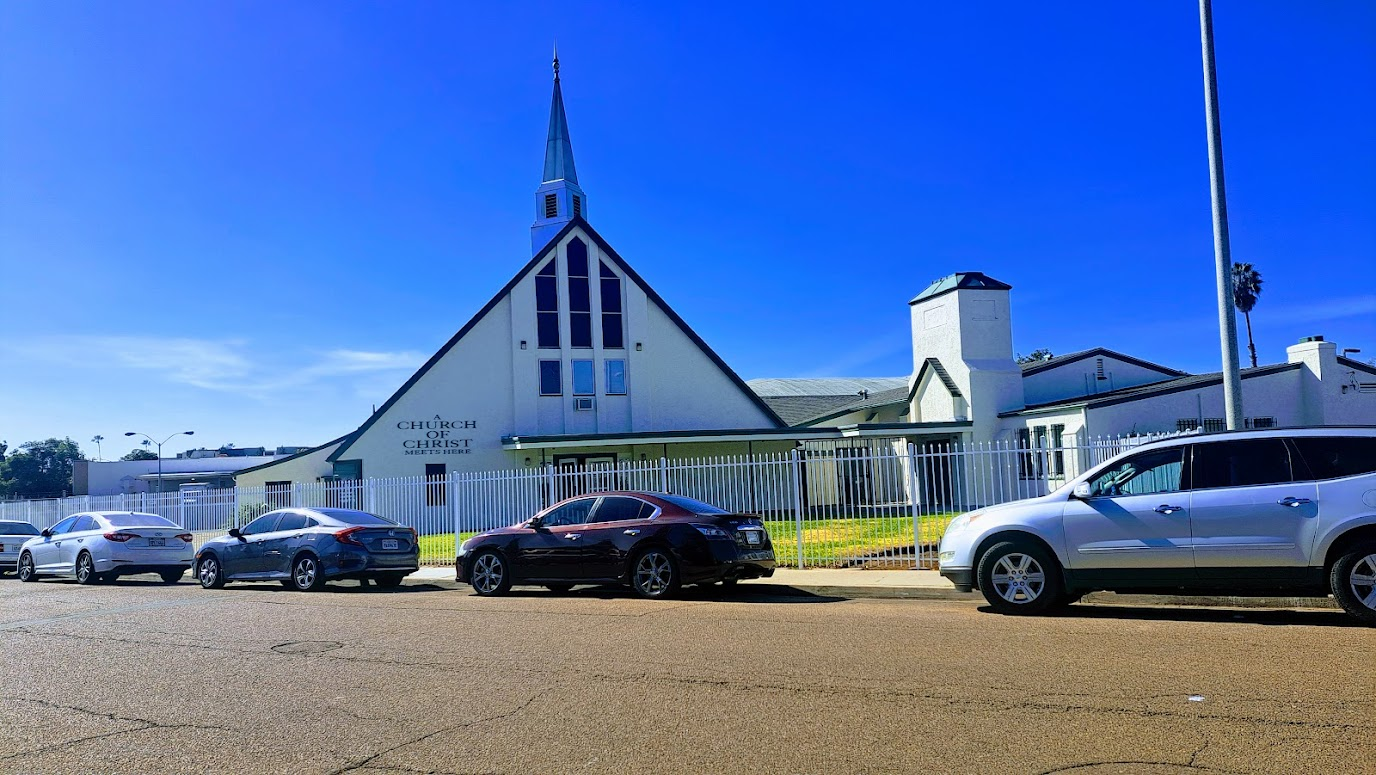
Seminole Church of Christ, 4790 Seminole Drive

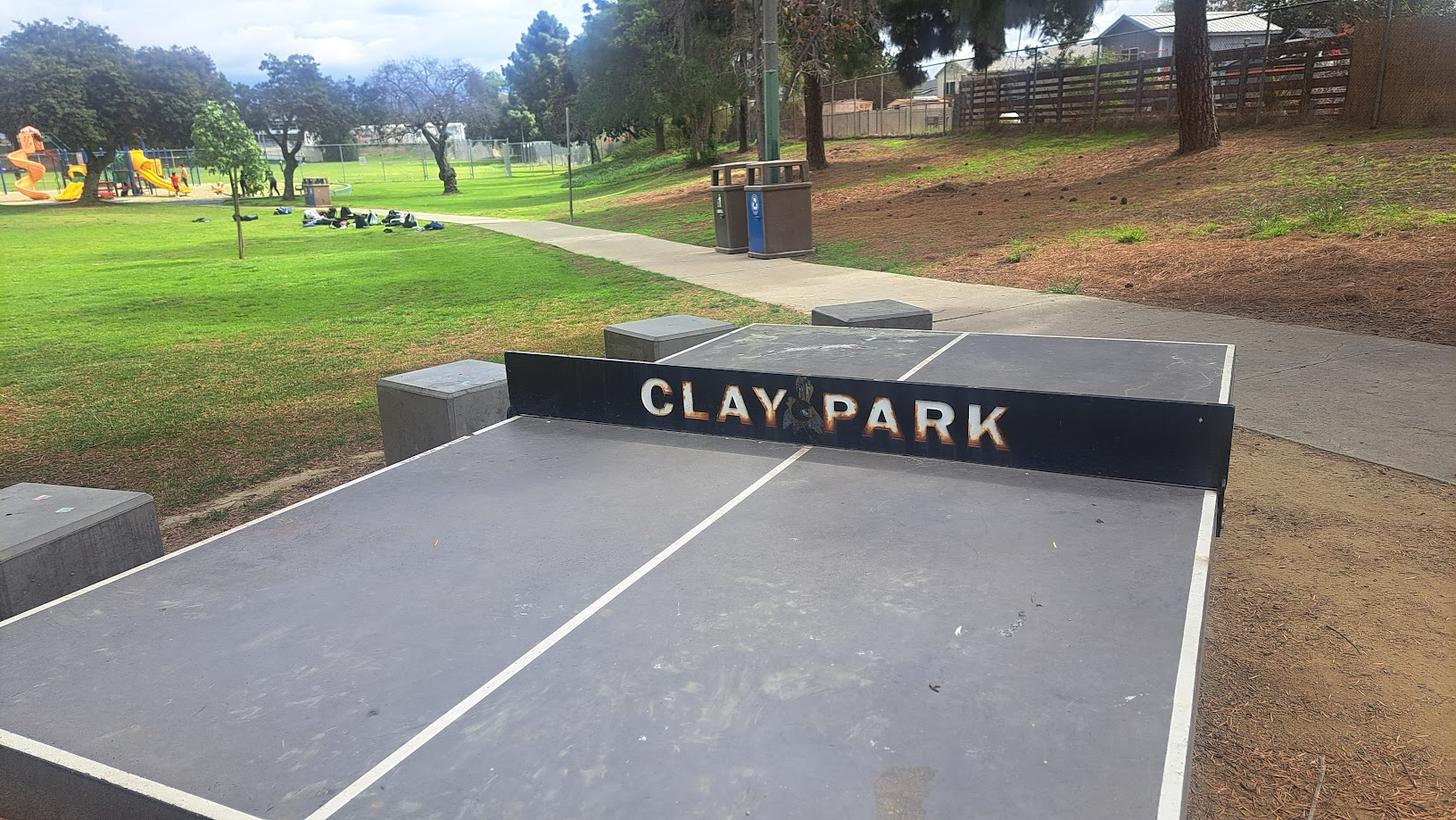
The former Clay Park, 4768 Seminole Dr

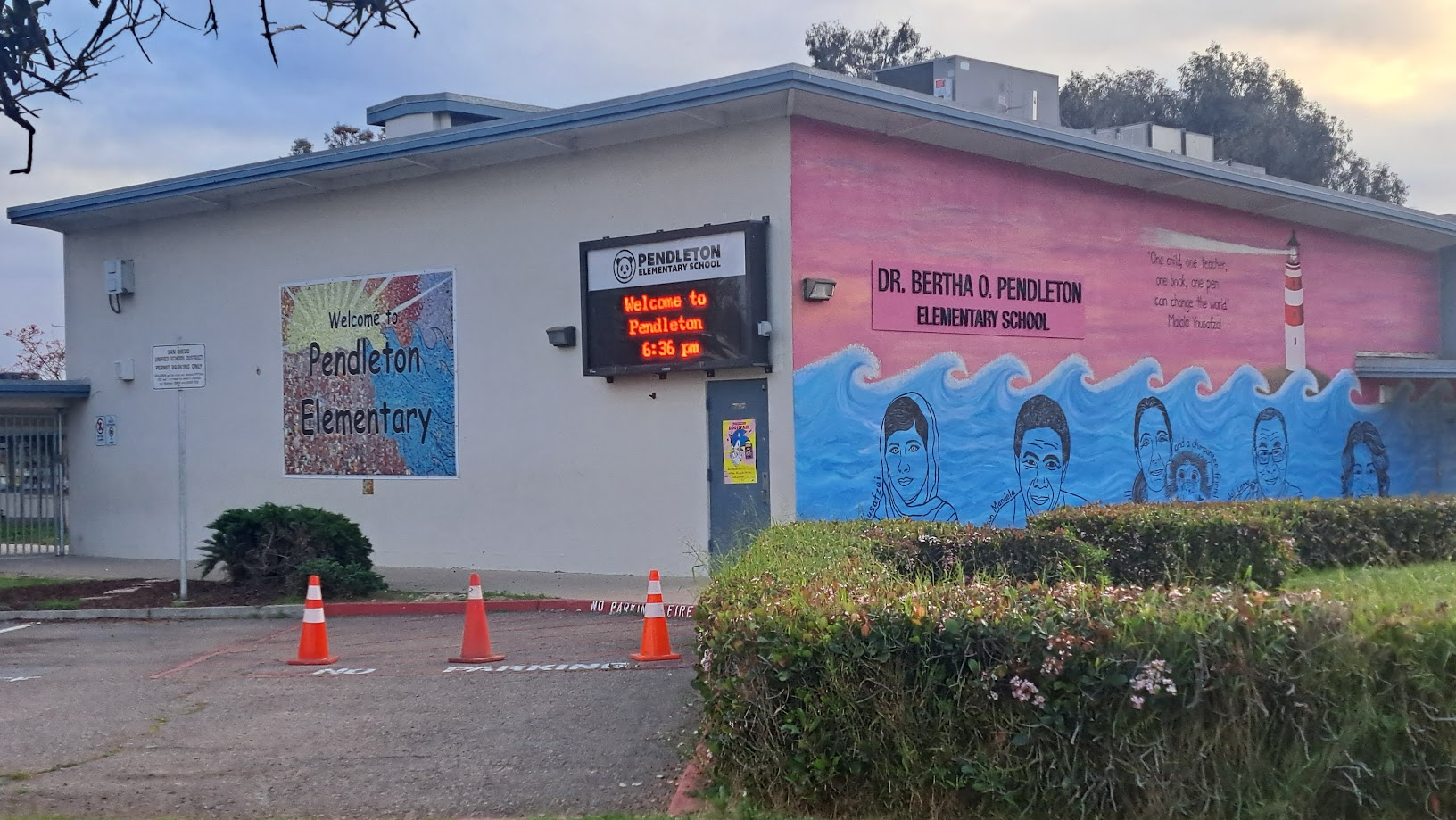
Dr. Bertha O. Pendleton Elementary School, 6506 Solita Ave.

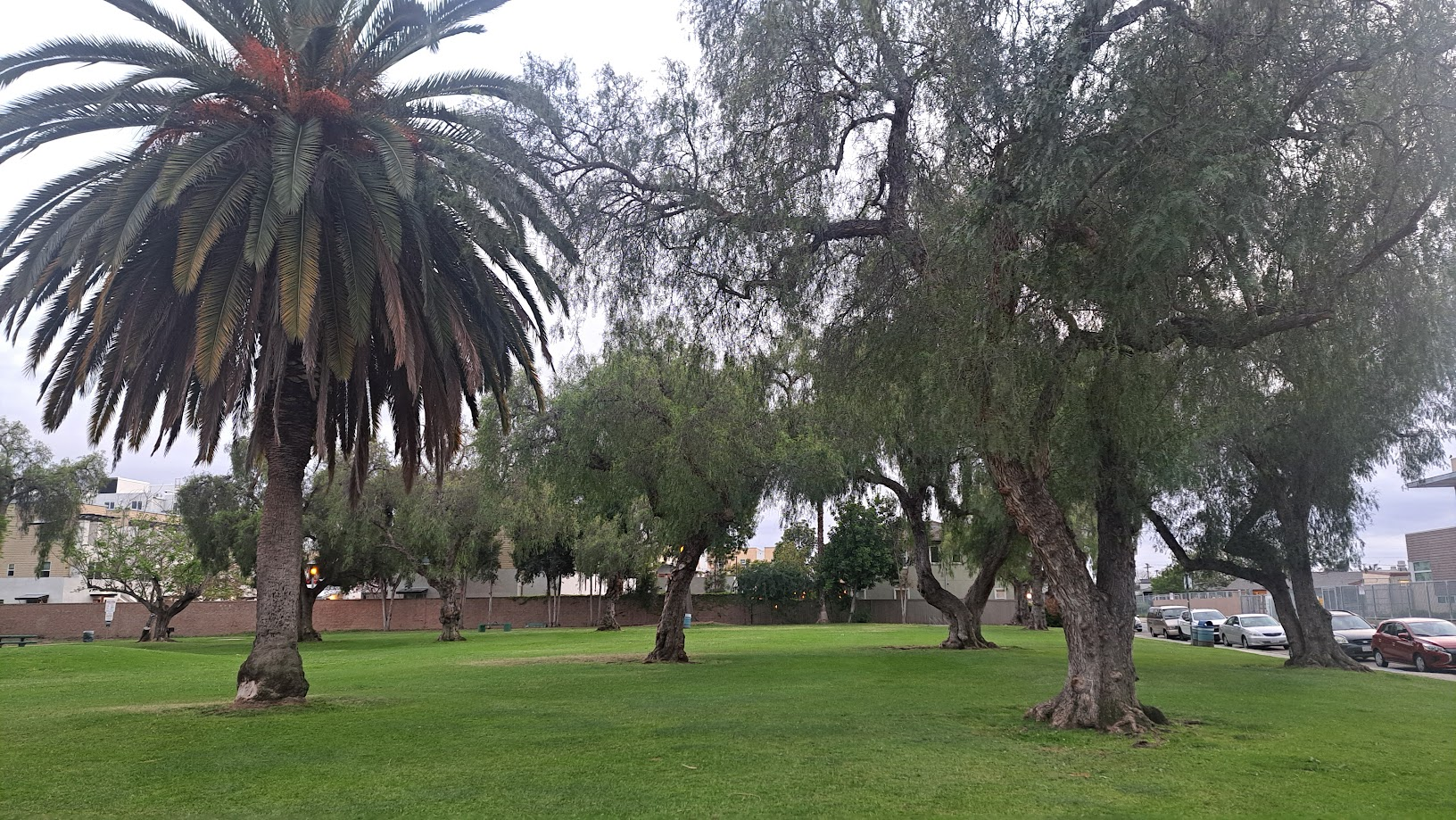
Montezuma Park, 4929 Catoctin Dr

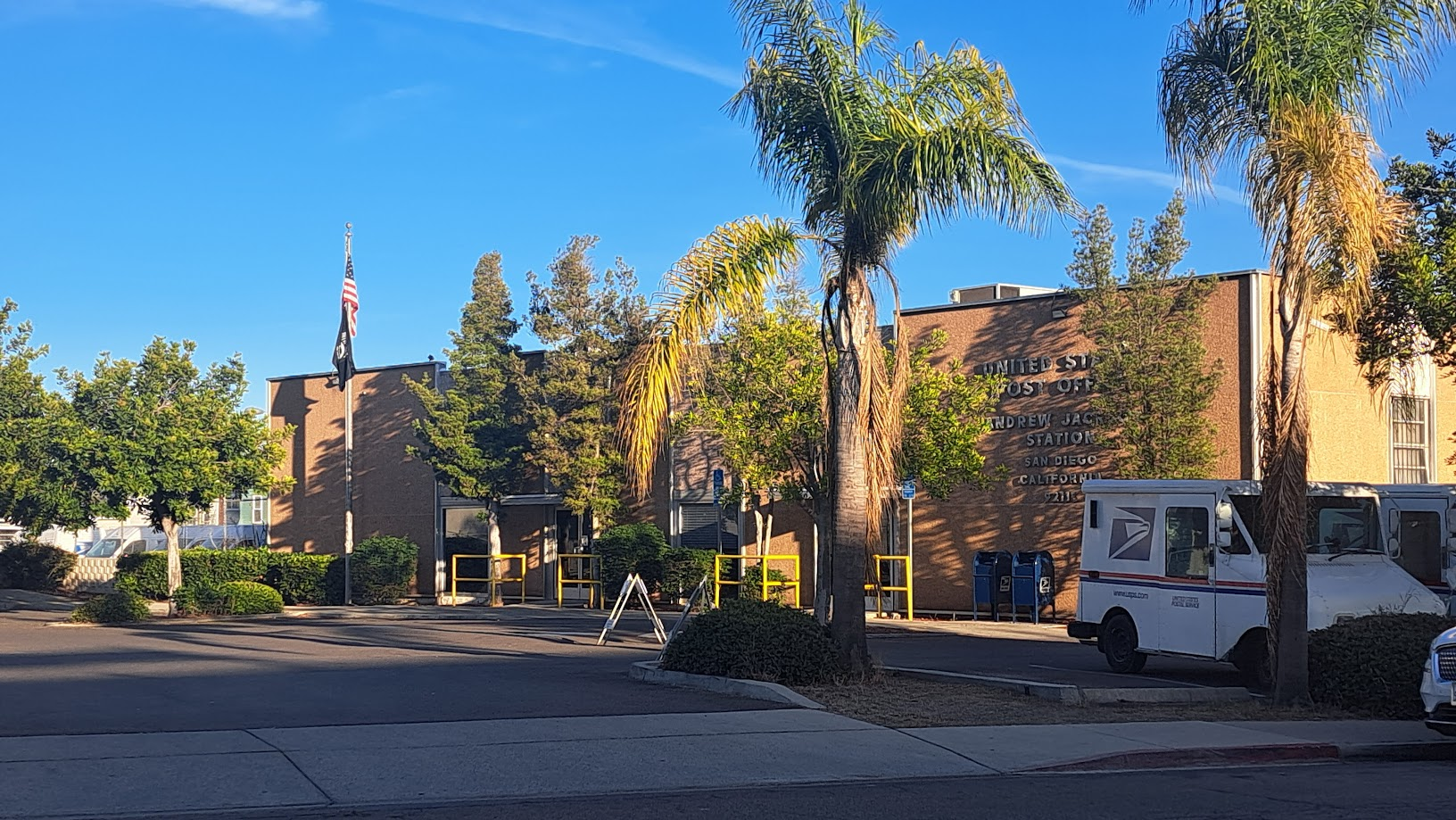
The Susan Davis Post Office, 6401 El Cajon Blvd
