= Grantville station =

San Diego Trolley station

Union Grantville
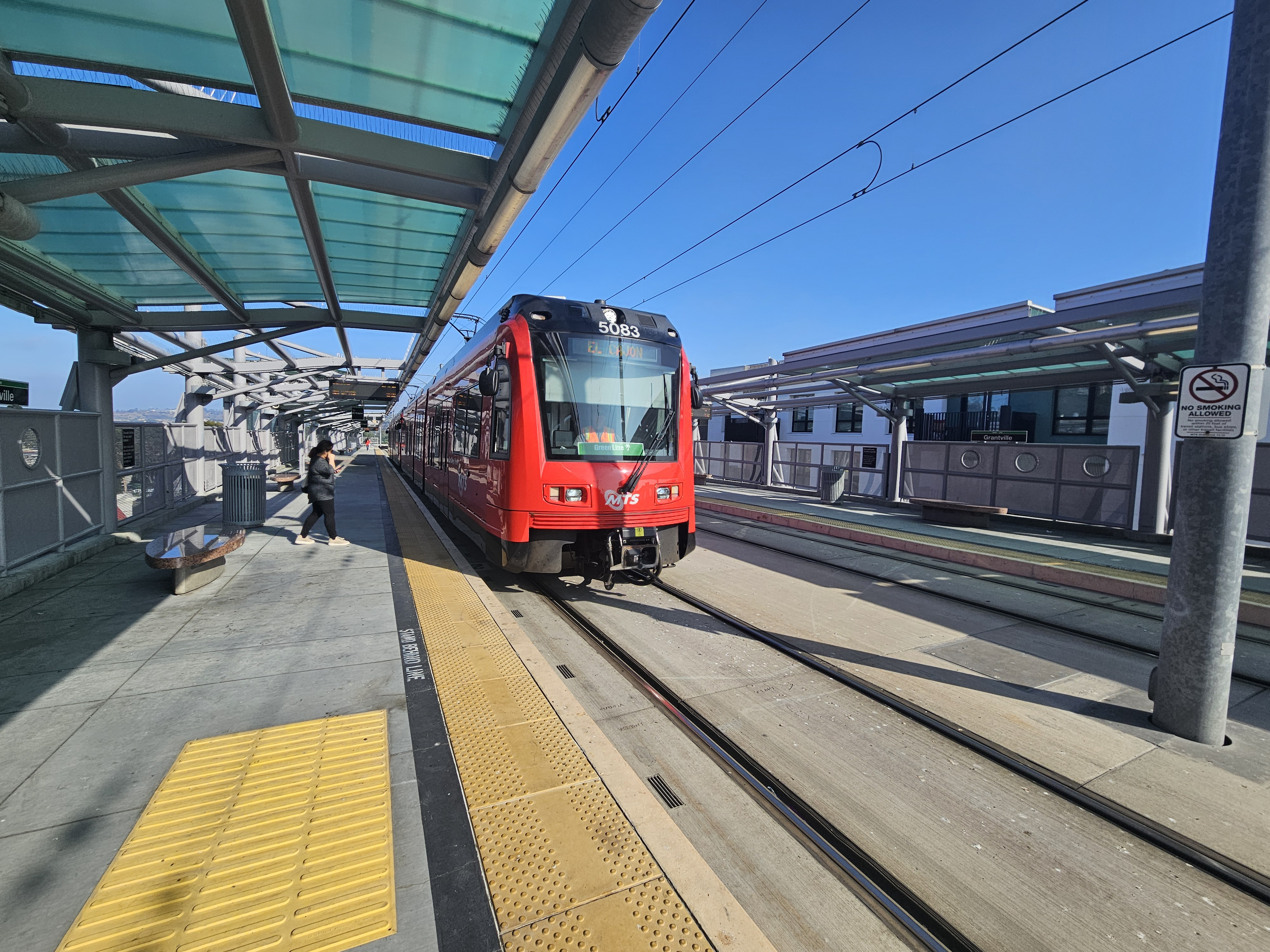
- An eastbound trolley at Union Grantville station, 2025

General information
- Location: 4510 Alvarado Canyon Road; San Diego, California; United States
- Coordinates: 32°46′50″N 117°5′51″W
- Owner: San Diego Metropolitan Transit System
- Operator: San Diego Trolley
- Platforms: 2 side platforms
- Tracks: 2
- Connections: MTS: 13, 14, 18

Construction
- Structure type: Elevated
- Parking: 100 spaces
- Accessible: Disabled access

History
- Opened: July 10, 2005

Services
Preceding station	San Diego Trolley	Following station
Mission San Diego toward 12th & Imperial	Green Line	SDSU toward El Cajon
Location

Union Grantville station is a station on San Diego Trolley's Green Line in the middle class residential Grantville neighborhood of San Diego, California. It opened in 2005.

The station is elevated and has side platforms with two railroad tracks passing between them. The station is located in the middle of a long, tall viaduct taking the trolley line over the Interstate 8 freeway. The station is located on Alvarado Canyon Road near Fairmount Avenue.

Grantville Station's design and art components by Michael Davis incorporate nautical and aviation themes from surrounding San Diego culture and history. Grantville Station is unique as the only two-level aerial station in its transit system, and Davis' station design takes advantage of the elevated platform with a 60-foot high elevator shaft and exterior spiral stairway. Additional station art and design features include tinted transparent platform canopies, stair and elevator shaft canopies, sculptural benches and pavement design, and extensive canopy, stairway, and station lighting.

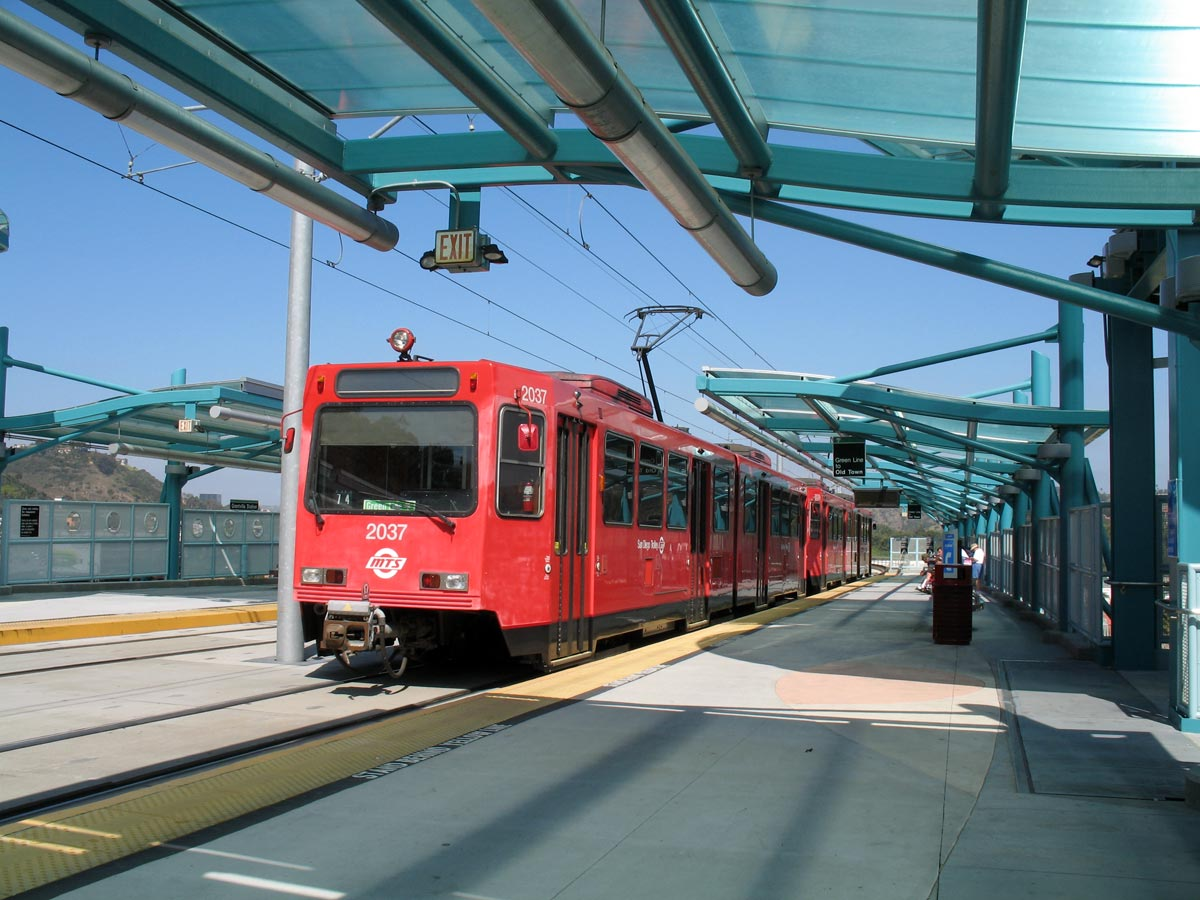
Grantville Station in 2008

In 2022, a 126-unit affordable housing complex was built in the station's underutilized parking lot. An additional 126 unit affordable housing project was completed in 2024. In 2025, the developer of the Union Grantville project acquired the naming rights to Grantville station.

== See also ==
- List of San Diego Trolley stations
