= H Street station =

San Diego Trolley station

H Street
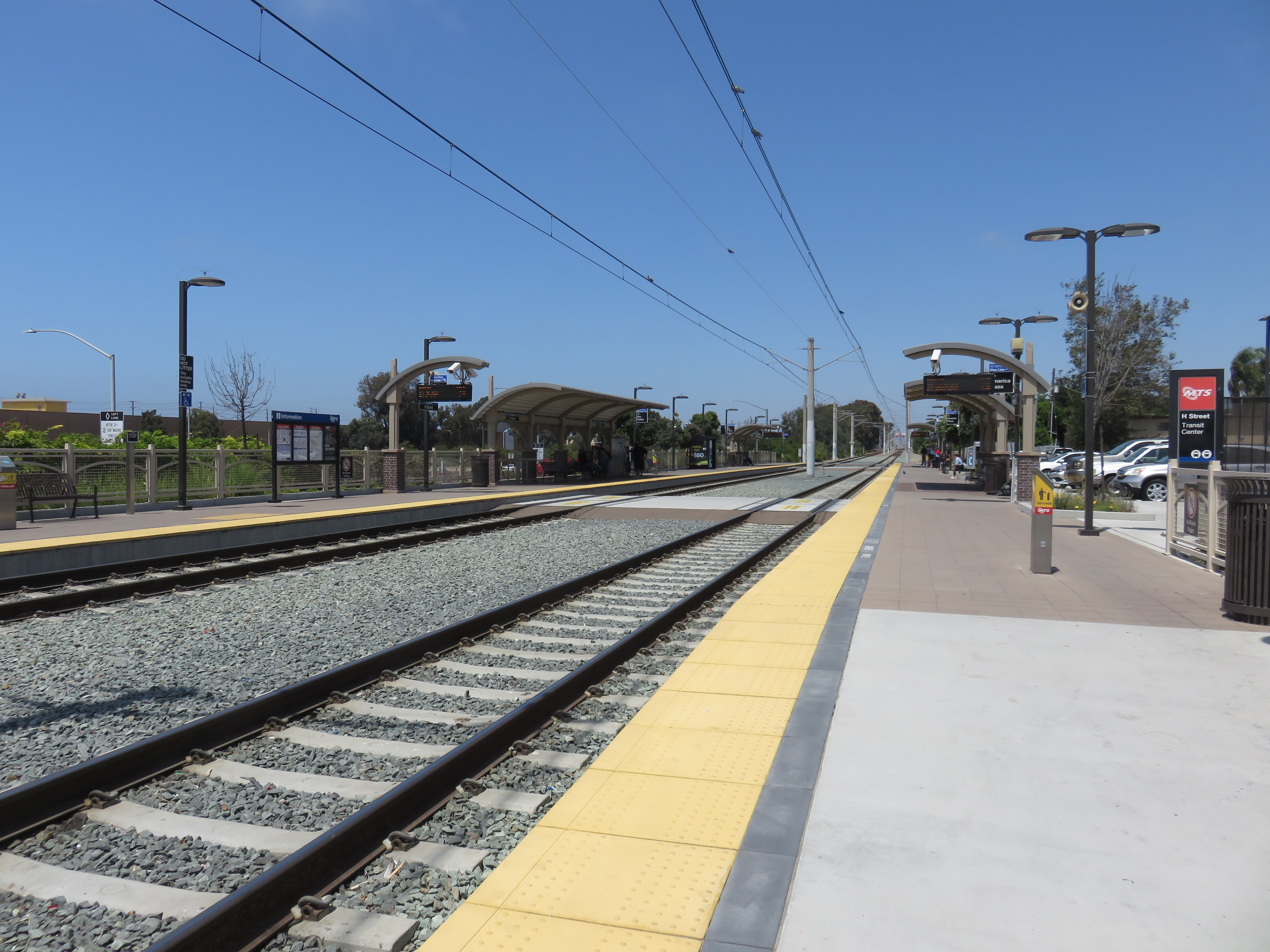
- H Street station platforms in August 2019

General information
- Location: 745 H Street; Chula Vista, California; United States
- Coordinates: 32°37′46″N 117°05′40″W
- Owner: San Diego Metropolitan Transit System
- Operator: San Diego Trolley
- Line: SD&AE Main Line
- Platforms: 2 side platforms
- Tracks: 2
- Connections: MTS: 701, 709; Chula Vista Bayfront Shuttle: Blue Line

Construction
- Structure type: At-grade
- Parking: 295 spaces
- Cycle facilities: 16 rack spaces, 4 lockers
- Accessible: Disabled access

Other information
- Station code: 75010, 75011

History
- Opened: July 26, 1981
- Rebuilt: 2014

Services
Preceding station	San Diego Trolley	Following station
E Street toward UTC	Blue Line	Palomar Street toward San Ysidro
Location

H Street station is a station on the Blue Line of the San Diego Trolley located in the city of Chula Vista, California. It is adjacent to the 5 Freeway/H Street interchange. The stop serves both as a commuter center with a park and ride lot and as an access point to the nearby dense retail and large residential areas. It also provides access to nearby Southwestern Community College by way of the 709 bus.

== History ==
H Street opened as part of the initial 15.9-mile (25.6 km) "South Line" of the San Diego Trolley system on July 26, 1981, operating from San Ysidro north to downtown San Diego using the main line tracks of the San Diego and Arizona Eastern Railway.

This station was renovated, starting March 20, 2014, as part of the Trolley Renewal Project; it reopened with a renovated station platform in late October 2014.

== See also ==
- List of San Diego Trolley stations
