= 8th Street station (San Diego Trolley) =

San Diego Trolley station

8th Street
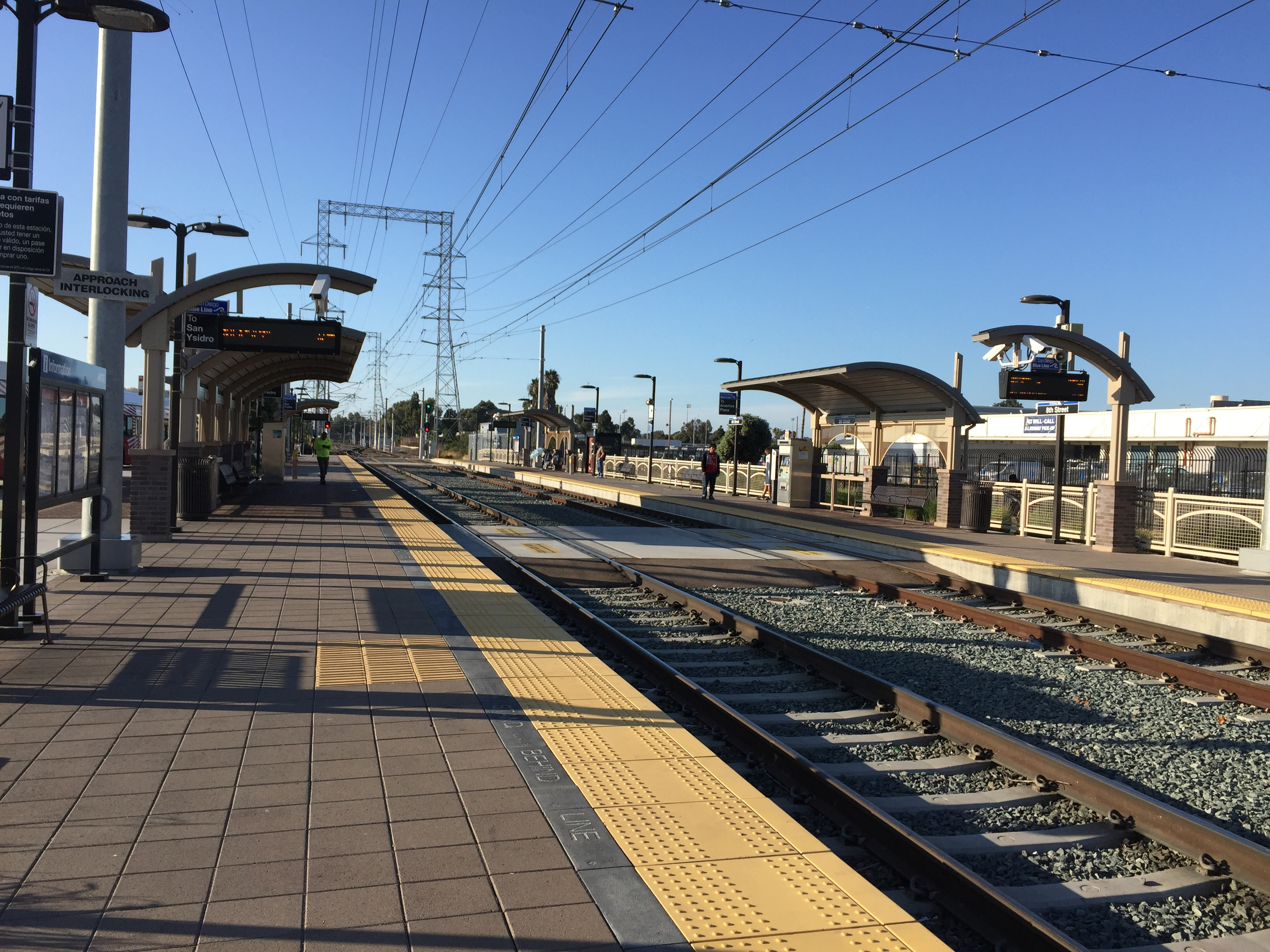
- 8th Street station platforms in 2019

General information
- Location: 555 West 8th Street; National City, California; United States
- Coordinates: 32°40′26″N 117°06′52″W
- Owner: San Diego Metropolitan Transit System
- Operator: San Diego Trolley
- Line: SD&AE Main Line
- Platforms: 2 side platforms
- Tracks: 2
- Connections: MTS: 932, 955, 962, 963, 968

Construction
- Structure type: At-grade
- Parking: 123 spaces
- Cycle facilities: 8 rack spaces, 2 lockers
- Accessible: Disabled access

Other information
- Station code: 75016, 75017

History
- Opened: July 26, 1981
- Rebuilt: 2014

Services
Preceding station	San Diego Trolley	Following station
Pacific Fleet toward UTC	Blue Line	24th Street toward San Ysidro
Location

8th Street station is a station on the Blue Line of the San Diego Trolley located near the intersection of 8th Street and Harbor Drive in National City, California. Surrounded by an industrial area, the primary focus of this station is to serve as a commuter lot, as it is easily accessible from Interstate 5.

== History ==
8th Street opened as part of the initial 15.9-mile (25.6 km) "South Line" of the San Diego Trolley system on July 26, 1981, operating from San Ysidro north to downtown San Diego using the main line tracks of the San Diego and Arizona Eastern Railway.

This station was renovated, starting January 20, 2014 as part of the Trolley Renewal Project; it reopened with a renovated station platform in early September 2014.

== See also ==
- List of San Diego Trolley stations
