= Palomar Street Transit Center =

San Diego Trolley station

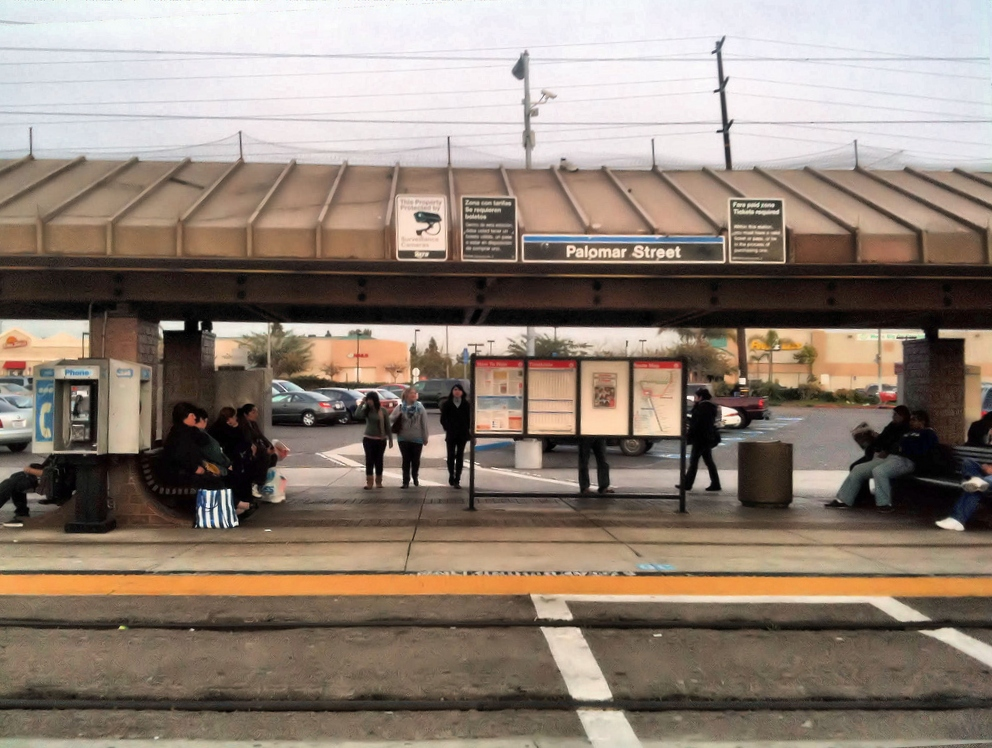
- Palomar Street Transit Center in 2010, before renovations

General information
- Location: 745 Industrial Avenue; Chula Vista, California; United States
- Coordinates: 32°36′11″N 117°05′07″W
- Owner: San Diego Metropolitan Transit System
- Operator: San Diego Trolley
- Line: SD&AE Main Line
- Platforms: 2 side platforms
- Tracks: 2
- Connections: MTS: 701, 704, 712, 910 (Overnight Express)

Construction
- Structure type: At-grade
- Parking: 305 spaces
- Cycle facilities: 4 rack spaces, 1 lockers
- Accessible: Disabled access

Other information
- Station code: 75008, 75009

History
- Opened: July 26, 1981
- Rebuilt: 2014

Services
Preceding station	San Diego Trolley	Following station
H Street toward UTC	Blue Line	Palm Avenue toward San Ysidro
Location

Palomar Street Transit Center is a station on the Blue Line of the San Diego Trolley located near the intersection of Palomar Street and Industrial Boulevard in Chula Vista, California. The stop serves a variety of purposes, holding the function of commuter center with a park and ride lot and providing access to the nearby commercial, industrial, and residential areas, as well as Southwestern Community College.

== History ==
Palomar Street Transit Center opened as part of the initial 15.9-mile (25.6 km) "South Line" of the San Diego Trolley system on July 26, 1981, operating from San Ysidro north to downtown San Diego using the main line tracks of the San Diego and Arizona Eastern Railway.

This station was renovated, starting March 2014, as part of the Trolley Renewal Project; it reopened with a renovated station platform in November 2014.

== See also ==
- List of San Diego Trolley stations
