= E Street station =

San Diego Trolley station

E Street
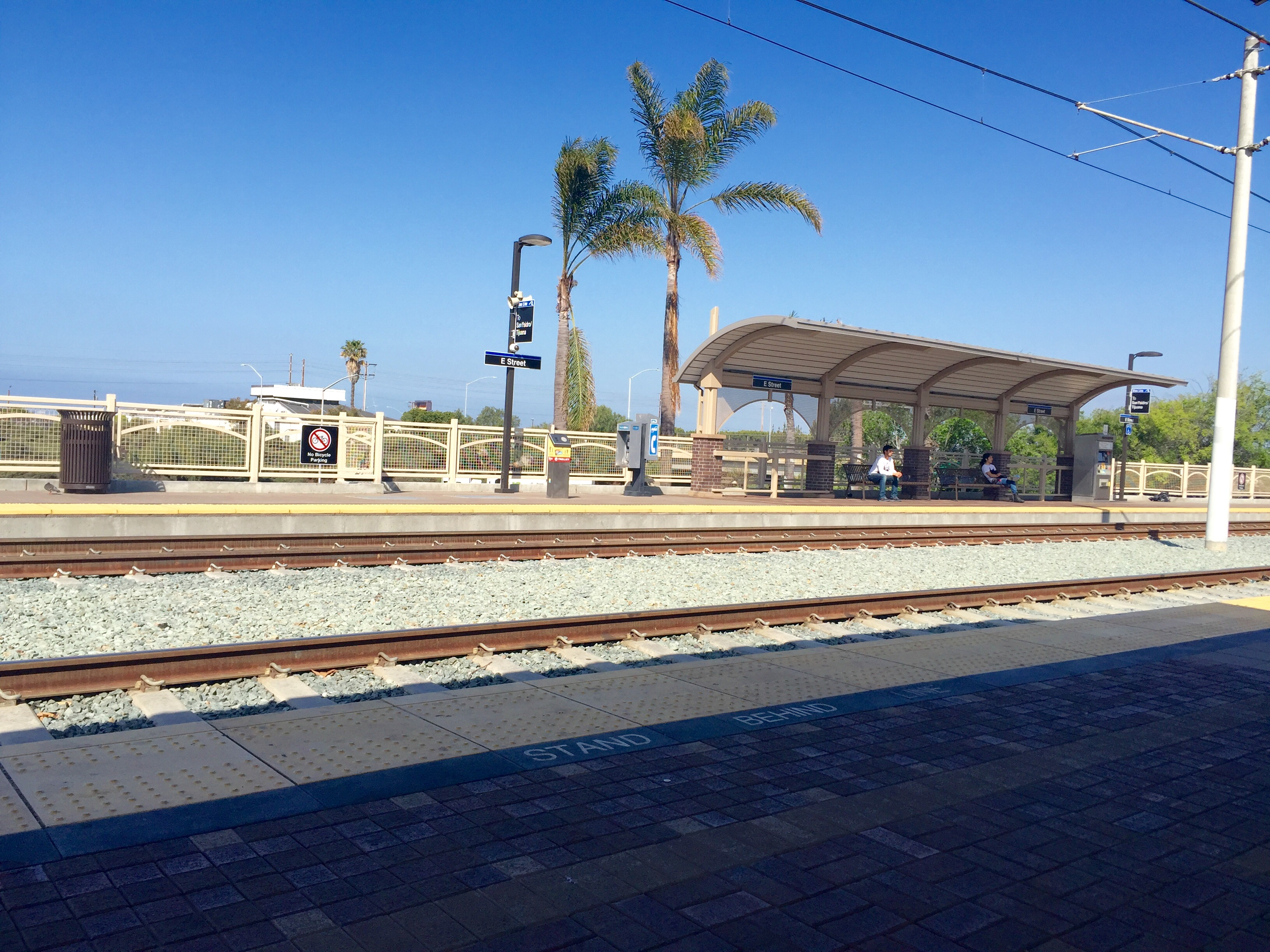
- E Street station platforms in 2016

General information
- Location: 750 E Street; Chula Vista, California; United States
- Coordinates: 32°38′20″N 117°05′57″W
- Owner: San Diego Metropolitan Transit System
- Operator: San Diego Trolley
- Line: SD&AE Main Line
- Platforms: 2 side platforms
- Tracks: 2
- Connections: MTS: 704, 705, 932; Living Coast Discovery Center Shuttle; Chula Vista Bayfront Shuttle: Blue Line, Green Line

Construction
- Structure type: At-grade
- Parking: 267 spaces
- Cycle facilities: 16 rack spaces, 4 lockers
- Accessible: Disabled access

Other information
- Station code: 75012, 75013

History
- Opened: October 1986
- Rebuilt: 2014
- Former names: Bayfront/E Street (1986–2012)

Services
Preceding station	San Diego Trolley	Following station
24th Street toward UTC	Blue Line	H Street toward San Ysidro
Location

E Street station (formerly Bayfront/E Street station) is a station on the Blue Line of the San Diego Trolley in Chula Vista, California. It is adjacent to the 5 Freeway/E Street interchange. The stop serves both as a commuter center with a park and ride lot and to provide access to the dense nearby retail area.

== History ==
Bayfront/E Street station was the first infill station of the San Diego Trolley system, opening on the Blue Line in October 1986, five years after the line's inauguration in July 1981. The station sits on the main line tracks of the San Diego and Arizona Eastern Railway.

This station was renovated, starting January 3, 2014 as part of the Trolley Renewal Project; it reopened with a renovated station platform in October 2014.

== See also ==
- List of San Diego Trolley stations
