= Parkway Plaza =

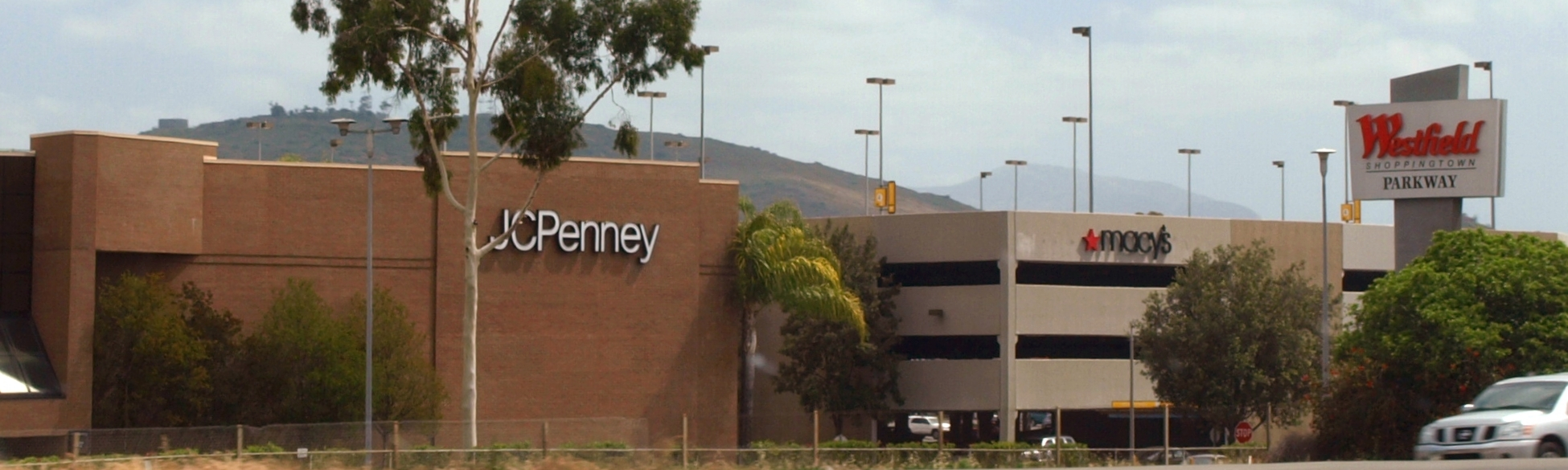
- Southern portion of the mall as seen from I-8
- Location: El Cajon, California, United States
- Coordinates: 32°48′17.10″N 116°58′03.67″W
- Address: 415 Parkway Plaza
- Opened: 1972
- Developer: The Hahn Company and Homart Development Company
- Manager: Pacific Retail
- Owner: Pacific Retail
- Num. of stores: 160 (as of 2026)
- Num. of anchor tenants: 10 (8 open, 2 vacant)
- Floor area: 1,300,000 sq ft (120,000 m^{2})
- Floors: 1 with partial upper level (2 in JCPenney, Regal Cinemas, and former Walmart, 4 in Parking Garage)
- Parking: Multiple parking lots and parking structures
- Public transit: Arnele Avenue; MTS: 833, 874, 875, 888, 891, 892, 894
- Website: shoppingparkwayplaza.com

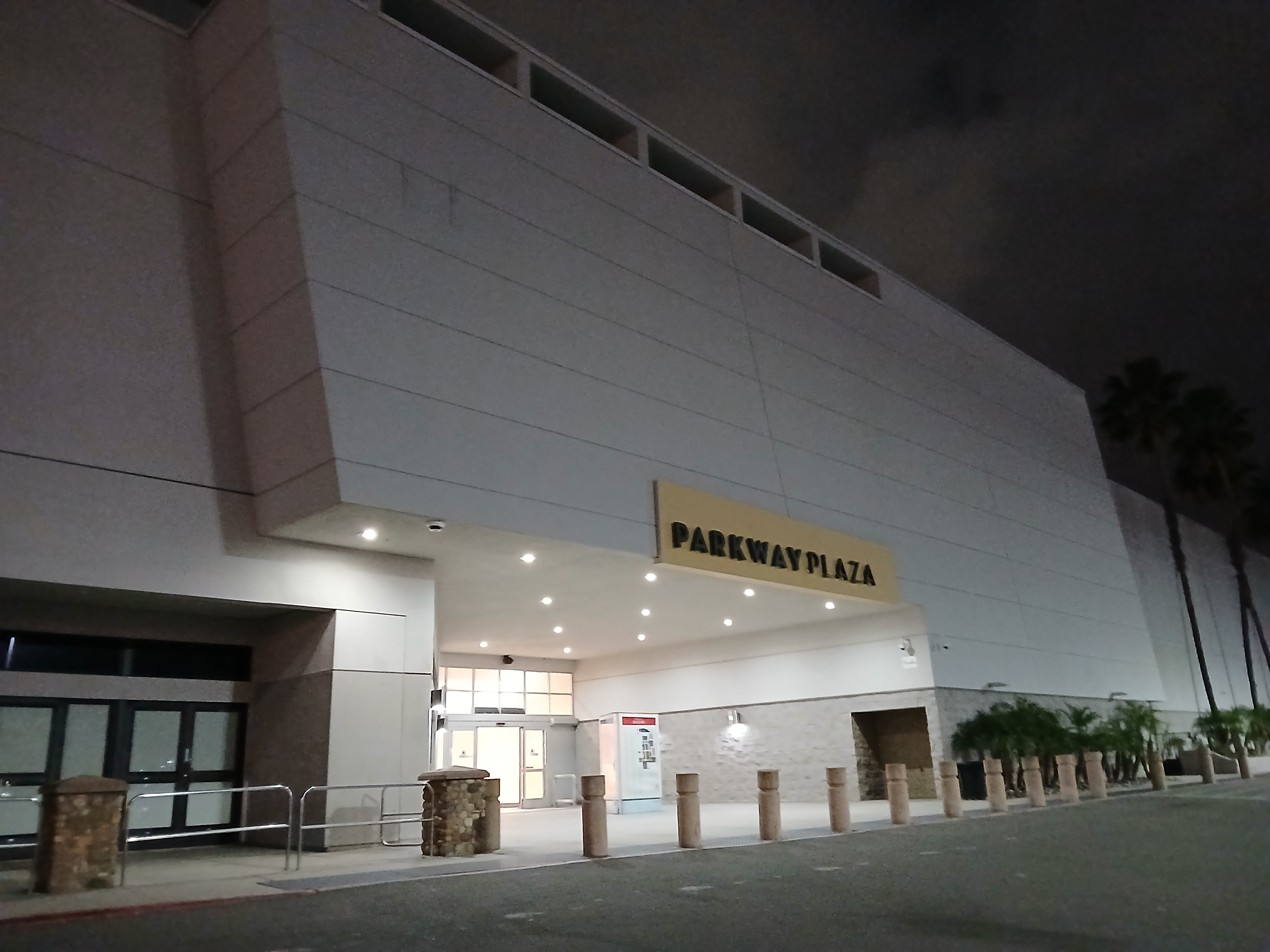
Parkway Plaza in 2025

Parkway Plaza is a shopping mall in El Cajon, California. The mall's anchor stores are Crunch Fitness, Dick's Sporting Goods, Ashley HomeStore, Bob's Discount Furniture, Burlington, Extra Space Storage, Regal Cinemas, and JCPenney.

== Ownership ==
Westfield America, Inc., a precursor to Westfield Group, acquired the shopping center in 1998, and renamed it Westfield Shoppingtown Parkway, but dropped the "Shoppingtown" part of the name in June 2005. In 2013, Starwood Retail Partners obtained the mall, restored the mall to its original name, Parkway Plaza.

== Opening ==
Parkway Plaza was developed in the early 1970s, shortly after Plaza Camino Real in Carlsbad, as the second enclosed shopping mall in San Diego County. Building an indoor mall was ideal for the area, as El Cajon is notoriously hot during the summer. Since opening the mall, Parkway Plaza has expanded as necessary.

Sears Roebuck opened first, on the west edge of the property, on August 5, 1969, as a freestanding anchor. The mall was built shortly thereafter, attaching to its east side. May Company originally anchored the mall's East end and a large Woolworth's maintained the middle anchor position on the south side. A 3-screen movie triplex was located on the south side of the mall as was a Farrell's Ice Cream Parlour, near May Co. The main entrance on the north side featured an iconic-contemporary geometric roof, the surface of which has been altered over the years and originally featured no branding. A simple illuminated red sign stating "Parkway Plaza", along with a unique logo, was displayed on the brickwork to the right of the entrance. Initially, with the exception of Farrell's and the theaters, small-shop storefronts were not featured anywhere on the exterior of the mall; only large sloping planters that hid the loading Midland docks of the various shops. The interior featured skylights and 1970s contemporary decor, with numerous built-in planters and seating throughout.

The outlying wing of the shopping center, on the east edge of the property, was anchored by a Food Basket grocery store and Shakey's Pizza. Food Basket was eventually rebranded as Lucky. This wing was rebuilt and now includes a Best Buy, HomeGoods (originally a Borders bookstore), and Office Depot (now closed).

Mervyn's opened in 1989. JCPenney opened in November 1990. The food court was added in 1991. May Co. became Robinsons-May in 1993. Woolworth's eventually became Sport Chalet. Sport Chalet closed in 1998 and became Regal Cinemas in 1999. Walmart opened in October 2004 as their second two-level store to open after the one in Grossmont Center.

In September 2006, The Robinsons-May was rebranded into a Macy's.

In 2008, Mervyn's announced the liquidation of all their stores due to bankruptcy. Mervyn's closed in January 2009. In 2011, the upper level of the former Mervyn's became a Crunch Fitness which opened in July of that year and Dick's Sporting Goods opened in October of that year on the lower level part of the former Mervyn's. In 2015, Sears Holdings spun off 235 of its retail properties, including the Sears at Parkway Plaza, into Seritage Growth Properties.

On April 23, 2018, it was announced that Sears would be closing its Parkway Plaza location as part of a plan to close 42 stores nationwide. The store closed in July 2018. On May 13, 2019, it was announced that portions of the former Sears would become Ashley HomeStore, Bob's Discount Furniture, Burlington, and Extra Space Storage. Bob's Discount Furniture opened in July 2019. Burlington opened in March 2020. Ashley HomeStore opened in 2020.

On January 6, 2021, it was announced that Macy's would be closing in April 2021 as part of a plan to close 46 stores nationwide.

On April 30, 2021, Five Below opened at the old Charming Charlie location, making it the first Five Below to open in East County.

On January 11, 2024, it was announced that Walmart would be closing on February 9, which made JCPenney the only remaining traditional anchor left.

== Carousel ==
In 1991, a 1926 Allan Herschell Company carousel was placed inside the mall. It ran until 2003, when it was relocated to Elyria, Ohio. In 2004, a two-story carousel replaced the 1926 Allan Herschell carousel. In January 2016, the double-decker carousel moved to Wichita, Kansas. On January 31, 2016, a rumor circulated that the 1926 Allan Herschell carousel was returning to Parkway Plaza.

== See also ==
- Westfield Group
