= San Diego MTS bus system =

Bus transit system in Southern San Diego County

MTS Bus
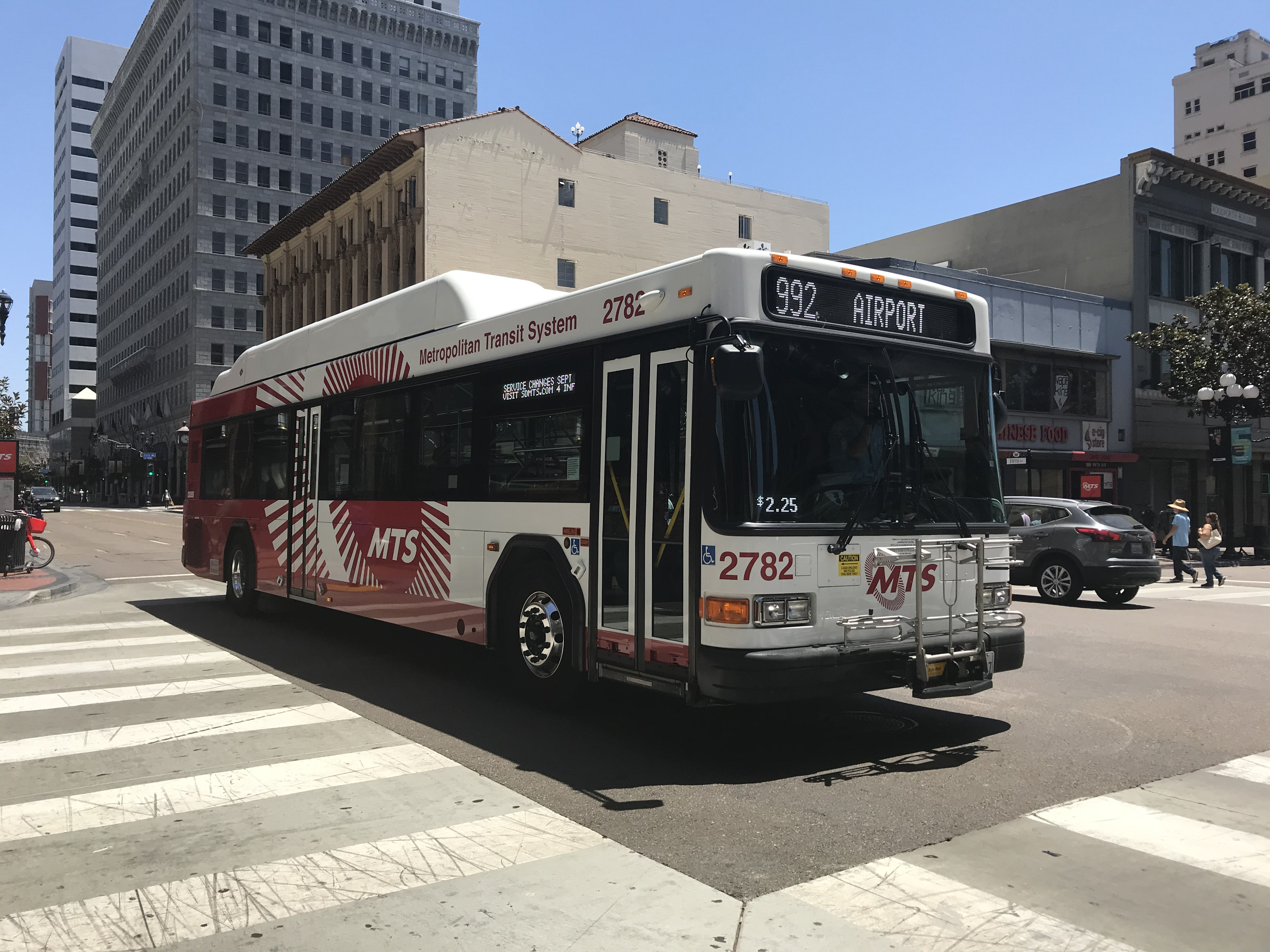
- MTS Bus Gillig Low Floor operating on Route 992 in August 2019
- Parent: San Diego Metropolitan Transit System
- Headquarters: James R. Mills Building; 1255 Imperial Avenue; San Diego, CA
- Service area: Southern San Diego County, California
- Service type: Transit bus
- Routes: 97
- Fleet: 750 buses
- Daily ridership: 130,500 (weekdays, Q2 2026)
- Annual ridership: 37,930,300 (2025)
- Fuel type: Compressed natural gas; Battery-electric
- Operator: San Diego Transit Corporation; Transdev

The San Diego MTS bus system is a public transport bus service serving San Diego County, California. It is part of the San Diego Metropolitan Transit System (MTS). The system operates 97 bus routes in San Diego and the rest of the southern half of the county. There are 85 "MTS Bus" fixed-route services, 9 "Rapid" bus rapid transit routes, and the "MTS Access" paratransit service.

Routes are operated by private contractors and by the San Diego Transit Corporation (SDTC), a subsidiary of MTS. SDTC operates 27 routes based out of downtown San Diego (Imperial Avenue Division), Transdev operates 74 routes based out of Chula Vista (South Bay Division) and El Cajon (East County Division), and operates the "MTS Access" paratransit service that are operated with mini-buses based out of Kearny Mesa (Copley Park Division).

All buses and division facilities, even those used by contractors, are owned by MTS. MTS serves San Diego proper and the surrounding East County and South Bay regions, while the North County area is served by the North County Transit District (NCTD)'s BREEZE bus system.

== Routes ==
=== Rapid Routes ===
Type	Route	Terminals		Via	Annual ridership (FY 2026)	Links	Notes
SuperLoop Rapid (Note: Routes 201/202 and 204 were formerly known as SuperLoop until the introduction of Rapid in 2015. Some parts of the MTS website still use the names "SuperLoop Rapid 201/202" and "SuperLoop Rapid 204" for these routes, however.)	201/202	University City; UTC Transit Center		La Jolla Village Dr, Nobel Dr	2,555,904	Schedule	Frequent service; Loop service; 201 operates counterclockwise; 202 operates clockwise
SuperLoop Rapid	204	University City; UTC Transit Center		Executive Dr, Judicial Dr, Nobel Dr	66,913	Schedule	Weekdays only; Loop service, operates clockwise
Rapid	215	Downtown San Diego; Santa Fe Depot	College Area; SDSU Transit Center	El Cajon Bl	1,522,836	Schedule	Frequent service
Rapid	225	Downtown San Diego; Santa Fe Depot	Otay Mesa; Otay Mesa Transit Center	SR 125, I-805	677,149	Schedule	
Rapid	227	Imperial Beach; Imperial Beach Pier (weekdays) Otay Mesa West; Iris Avenue Transit Center	Otay Mesa; Otay Mesa Transit Center	Coronado Av, SR 905	912,380	Schedule	Frequent service
Rapid	235	Downtown San Diego; Santa Fe Depot	Escondido; Escondido Transit Center	I-15	1,309,032	Schedule	Frequent service
Rapid	237	Mira Mesa; Miramar College Transit Station	Torrey Pines; Gilman Transit Center (UCSD)	Mira Mesa Bl	185,723	Schedule	Weekday peak only
Rapid Express	280	Downtown San Diego; Pacific Hwy & Grape St	Escondido; Escondido Transit Center	I-15, SR 163	63,310	Schedule	Weekday peak only
Rapid Express	290	Downtown San Diego; Pacific Hwy & Grape St	Sabre Springs; Sabre Springs Transit Station	I-15, SR 163	61,152	Schedule	Weekday peak only

=== Local Routes ===
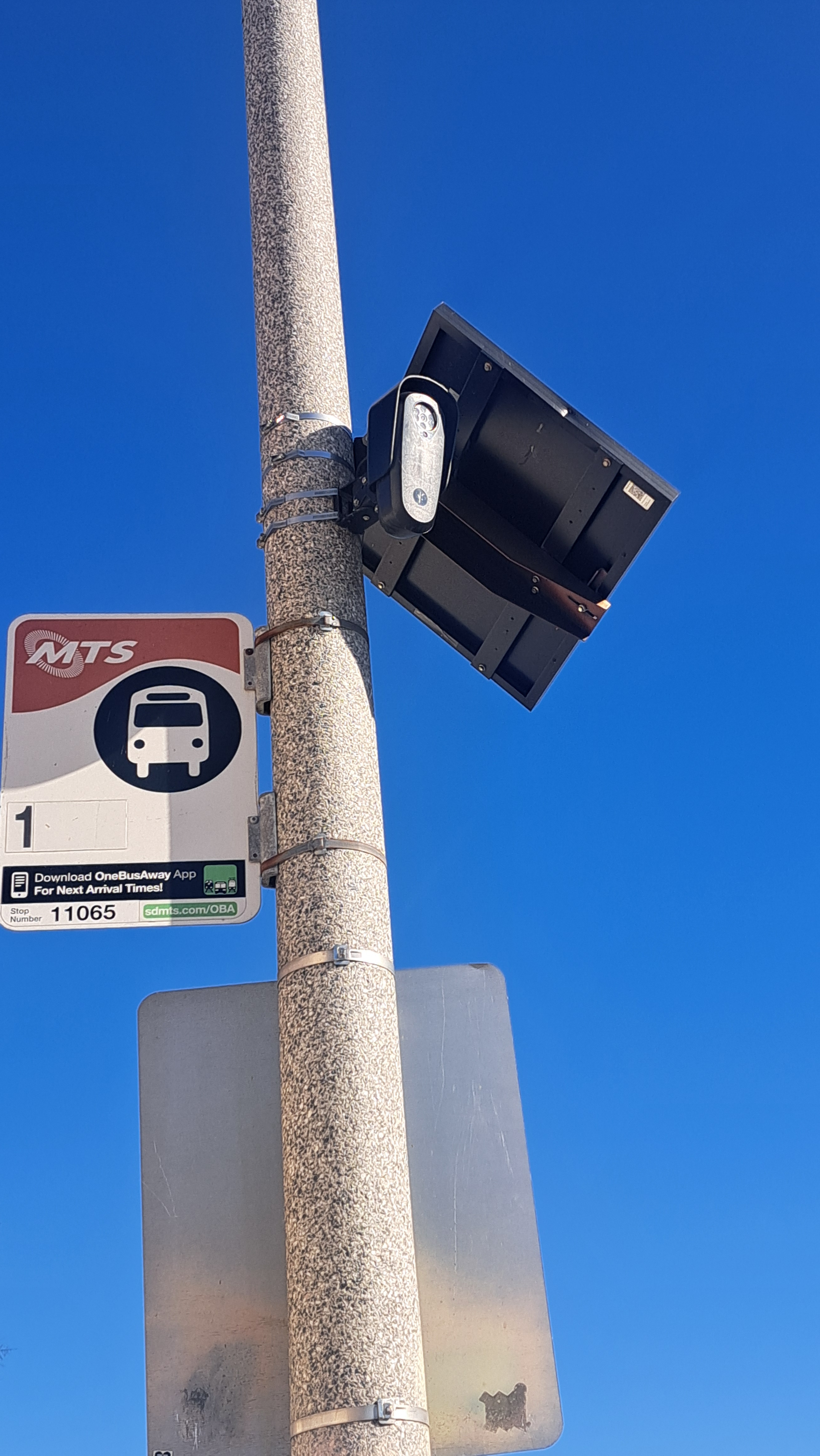
Bus Stop Sign, Route 1, El Cajon Boulevard & Keeney St, with ALPR camera

Route	Terminals		Via	Annual ridership (FY 2026)	Links	Notes
1	Mission Valley; Fashion Valley Transit Center	La Mesa; La Mesa Boulevard station	El Cajon Bl	968,197	Schedule	Frequent service
2	Downtown San Diego; Front St & B St	North Park; 30th St & Adams Av	Broadway, 30th St	599,196	Schedule	Frequent service
3	Chollas View; Euclid Avenue station	Hillcrest; Front St & Arbor Dr	Ocean View Bl	1,100,829	Schedule	Frequent service
4	Downtown San Diego; 12th & Imperial Transit Center	Skyline Hills; Paradise Valley Rd & Meadowbrook Dr	Imperial Av	498,739	Schedule	
5	Downtown San Diego; 10th Av & Broadway	Chollas View; Euclid Avenue station	Market St	467,476	Schedule	
6	Mission Valley; Fashion Valley Transit Center	North Park; 30th St & University Av	Camino De La Reina	215,383	Schedule	
7	Downtown San Diego; Front St & B St	Redwood Village; University Av & College Av	University Av	1,928,335	Schedule	Frequent service
8	Old Town; Old Town Transit Center	Clairemont; Balboa Avenue Transit Center	Grand Av, Mission Bay Dr	620,557	Schedule	Frequent service
9/9A	Old Town; Old Town Transit Center	Pacific Beach; Jewell St & Garnet Av	Ingraham St, Sea World	265,662	Schedule	Route 9A does not enter Sea World
10	Old Town; Old Town Transit Center	Redwood Village; University Av & College Av (weekdays) City Heights; City Heights Transit Center (weekends)	University Av	1,031,468	Schedule	Makes limited stops east of Albatross St
11	Downtown San Diego; 1st Av & Broadway	College Area; SDSU Transit Center	Adams Av, 1st Av	505,373	Schedule	
12	Downtown San Diego; 12th & Imperial Transit Center	Skyline Hills; Paradise Valley Rd & Meadowbrook Dr	National Av, Skyline Dr	893,804	Schedule	Frequent service
13	National City; 24th Street station	Grantville; Crawford St & Zion Av (Kaiser Hospital)	Fairmount Av	1,836,931	Schedule	Frequent service
14	Grantville; Grantville station	La Mesa; Baltimore Dr & Lake Murray Bl	70th St, Camino Del Rio	46,098	Schedule	Weekdays only
18	Grantville; Grantville station		Camino Del Rio	16,566	Schedule	Weekdays only; Loop service, operates counterclockwise
20	Downtown San Diego; 10th Av & Broadway	Rancho Bernardo; Rancho Bernardo Transit Station	I-15, Fashion Valley Transit Center, SR-163	416,808	Schedule	Express service
25	Mission Valley; Fashion Valley Transit Center	Kearny Mesa; Kearny Mesa Transit Center	Aero Dr, SR-163	52,846	Schedule	Weekdays only
27	Kearny Mesa; Kearny Mesa Transit Center	Pacific Beach; Bayard St & Garnet Av	Garnet Av, Balboa Av	291,295	Schedule	
28	Old Town; Old Town Transit Center	La Playa; Anchorage Ln & Shelter Island Dr	Rosecrans St	258,549	Schedule	
30	Old Town; Old Town Transit Center	University City; UTC Transit Center	La Jolla Bl	1,229,089	Schedule	Frequent service
31	University City; UTC Transit Center	Mira Mesa; Miramar College Transit Station	Miramar Rd	78,847	Schedule	Weekday peak only
35	Old Town; Old Town Transit Center	Ocean Beach; Cable St & Newport Av	Midway Dr, Cable St	397,104	Schedule	Frequent service
41	Mission Valley; Fashion Valley Transit Center	Torrey Pines; Gilman Transit Center (UCSD) (weekdays) University City; UTC Transit Center (weekends)	Genesee Av	798,344	Schedule	Frequent service
43	Kearny Mesa; Kearny Mesa Transit Center	Clairemont; Balboa Avenue Transit Center	Clairemont Mesa Bl	454,523	Schedule	
44	Old Town; Old Town Transit Center	Kearny Mesa; Kearny Mesa Transit Center	Linda Vista / Mesa College	817,937	Schedule	Frequent service
60	University City; UTC Transit Center	Chollas View; Euclid Avenue station	I-805, I-15, SR-15	54,607	Schedule	Weekday peak only; Express service
83	Old Town; Old Town Transit Center	Downtown San Diego; America Plaza station	Reynard Way / Mission Hills	17,884	Schedule	Weekdays only
84	Point Loma; Cabrillo National Monument	Point Loma; Sub Base Gate	Rosencrans St (Sub Base) or Catalina Bl (Cabrillo Monument)	14,352	Schedule	Weekdays only
88	Old Town; Old Town Transit Center	Mission Valley; Hotel Circle North & Fashion Valley Rd	Hotel Circle	107,868	Schedule	
105	Old Town; Old Town Transit Center	University City; UTC Transit Center (weekdays) Clairemont; Clairemont Square (weekday evenings and weekends)	Morena Bl, Clairemont Dr	191,471	Schedule	
115	College Area; SDSU Transit Center	El Cajon; El Cajon Transit Center	Jackson Dr, Fletcher Pkwy	207,068	Schedule	
120	Downtown San Diego; 4th Av & C St	Kearny Mesa; Kearny Mesa Transit Center (weekdays) Serra Mesa; Sharp Memorial Hospital (weekends)	Fashion Valley Rd, Linda Vista Rd	469,141	Schedule	Frequent service; Makes limited stops south of Fashion Valley Transit Center
701	Chula Vista; H Street station	Chula Vista; Palomar Street station	Main St, Hilltop Dr, F St	330,724	Schedule	
704	Chula Vista; E Street station	Chula Vista; Palomar Street station	Naples St, Orange Av	365,288	Schedule	
705	Chula Vista; E Street station	Chula Vista; Southwestern College	E St, Otay Lakes Rd	175,959	Schedule	Monday–Saturday only
707	Chula Vista; Eastlake Pkwy & Olympic Pkwy	Chula Vista; Southwestern College	Eastlake Pkwy	93,115	Schedule	Weekdays only
709/709L	Chula Vista; H Street station	Chula Vista; Olympic Pkwy & Eastlake Pkwy	H St	704,279	Schedule	Frequent service; 709L operates limited-stop service when Southwestern College is in session
712	Chula Vista; Palomar Street station	Chula Vista; Southwestern College	Palomar St	547,459	Schedule	Frequent service
815	El Cajon; El Cajon Transit Center	El Cajon; Main St & Oakdale Av	Main St	328,447	Schedule	Frequent service
816	El Cajon; El Cajon Transit Center	Rancho San Diego; Cuyamaca College	Washington Av, Jamacha Rd	105,721	Schedule	Weekdays only
832	Santee; Santee station		Cuyamaca St, Woodglen Vista Dr, Magnolia Ave	34,296	Schedule	Loop service, operates clockwise
833	Santee; Santee station	El Cajon; El Cajon Transit Center	Graves Av	66,958	Schedule	
834	Santee; Santee station		Mission Gorge Rd	26,863	Schedule	Weekdays only; Loop service, operates clockwise
838	Granite Hills; East County Square	Alpine; Viejas Casino	Alpine Bl	96,748	Schedule	
848	El Cajon; El Cajon Transit Center	Lakeside; Mapleview St & Ashwood St	Winter Gardens Bl	262,190	Schedule	
851	La Mesa; Spring Street Station	La Presa; Spring Valley Shopping Center	Bancroft Dr, Sweetwater Rd	58,983	Schedule	Weekdays only
852	San Diego; Orange Av & 54th St	La Presa; Grossmont Transit Center	University Av	253,925	Schedule	
854	La Presa; Grossmont Transit Center	El Cajon; Grossmont College	Lake Murray Bl	63,587	Schedule	Weekdays only
854X	La Presa; Grossmont Transit Center	El Cajon; Grossmont College	SR-125	63,587	Schedule	Express service. Operates when Grossmont College is in session for Fall and Spring semesters
855	La Mesa; Spring Street station	Rancho San Diego; Jamacha Bl & Folex Way	Campo Rd	197,414	Schedule	
856	College Area; SDSU Transit Center	Rancho San Diego; Cuyamaca College	College Av, Jamacha Bl	467,355	Schedule	Frequent service
864	El Cajon; El Cajon Transit Center	Granite Hills; East County Square	Madison Av	268,979	Schedule	
872	El Cajon; El Cajon Transit Center		Chase Av, Magnolia Av	39,193	Schedule	Weekdays only; Loop service, operates counterclockwise
874/875	El Cajon; El Cajon Transit Center		Washington Av, Parkway Plaza, Broadway	250,204	Schedule	Loop service; 874 operates clockwise; 875 operates counterclockwise
901	Downtown San Diego; 1st Av & Broadway	Otay Mesa West; Iris Avenue Transit Center	Silver Strand Bl	616,276	Schedule	
904	Coronado; Glorietta Bl & 2nd Av	Coronado; Silver Strand Bl & Av de las Arenas	Orange Av	76,205	Schedule	During summer: frequent service, fare-free
905	Otay Mesa West; Iris Avenue Transit Center	Otay Mesa; Otay Mesa Transit Center	SR 905, Otay Mesa Rd	239,317	Schedule	
906/907	Otay Mesa West; Iris Avenue Transit Center	San Ysidro; San Ysidro Transit Center	Beyer Bl, San Ysidro Bl, Calle Primera	1,212,712	Schedule	Frequent service; Loop service; 906 operates clockwise; 907 operates counterclockwise
909	Otay Mesa; Otay Mesa Transit Center	Otay Mesa; Southwestern College Otay Mesa	Otay Mesa Rd, Britannia Bl	48,491	Schedule	Weekdays only
910	Downtown San Diego; Santa Fe Depot	San Ysidro; San Ysidro Transit Center	I-5	92,741	Schedule	Night owl express service only while the Blue Line Trolley are not operated on night owl service.
916/917	Chollas View; Euclid Avenue station		Streamview Dr, Massachusetts Av	129,538	Schedule	Loop service; 916 operates clockwise; 917 operates counterclockwise
921	San Diego; UTC Transit Center	Mira Mesa; Miramar College Transit Station	Mira Mesa Bl, Barnes Canyon Rd	248,318	Schedule	Weekdays only
921A	Torrey Pines; Gilman Transit Center (UCSD)	Mira Mesa; Miramar College Transit Station	Mira Mesa Bl, Mesa Verde Park	248,318	Schedule	Weekends only
923	Ocean Beach; Point Loma Av & Sunset Cliffs Bl	Downtown San Diego; 9th Av & C St	Voltaire St, Harbor Dr	145,543	Schedule	Weekdays only
928	Kearny Mesa; Kearny Mesa Transit Center	Mission Valley; Fashion Valley Transit Center	Ruffin Rd	161,863	Schedule	
929	Otay Mesa West; Iris Avenue Transit Center	Downtown San Diego; 12th & Imperial Transit Center	Highland Av, 3rd Av	1,435,380	Schedule	Frequent service
932	National City; 8th Street station (weekdays and Saturdays) Chula Vista; E Street station (Sundays)	Otay Mesa West; Iris Avenue Transit Center	National City Bl, Broadway	823,660	Schedule	Frequent service
933/934	Otay Mesa West; Iris Avenue Transit Center		Imperial Beach Bl / Palm Av	1,248,260	Schedule	Frequent service; Loop service; 933 operates counterclockwise; 934 operates clockwise
936	College Area; SDSU Transit Center	Spring Valley; Orville St & Brucker Av	College Grove / Skyline Drive	372,193	Schedule	Frequent service
944	Sabre Springs; Sabre Springs Transit Station	Poway; Hilleary Pl / Hilleary Park Dr	Poway Rd	50,237	Schedule	Weekdays only
945/945A	Rancho Bernardo; Rancho Bernardo Transit Station	Poway; Temple St / Midland Rd	Pomerado Rd, Poway Rd	110,887	Schedule	945A operates weekday peak-only via Espola Rd to serve Poway High School
955	National City; 8th Street station	College Area; SDSU Transit Center	43rd St / Euclid Avenue station / 54th St	1,038,487	Schedule	
961	National City; 24th Street station	Encanto; Encanto/62nd Street station	30th St / Plaza Bonita / Woodman St	516,858	Schedule	Frequent service
962	National City; 8th Street station	Spring Valley; Orville St & Brucker Av	Plaza Bl / Paradise Valley Rd	485,663	Schedule	Frequent service
963	National City; 8th Street station	Paradise Hills; Saipan Dr & Potomac St	Plaza Bl / Reo Drive	118,858	Schedule	Frequent service
964	Mira Mesa; Camino Ruiz & Capricorn Way	Scripps Ranch; Alliant International University	Miramar College Transit Station	97,860	Schedule	Weekdays only
965	City Heights; City Heights Transit Plaza		University Av / Azalea Park / Home Av	43,116	Schedule	Monday–Saturday only; Loop service, operates counterclockwise
967	National City; 8th Street station	Alta Vista; Division St & Ava St	D Av / Division St	41,380	Schedule	Weekdays only
968	National City; 8th Street station	National City; Westfield Plaza Bonita	4th St / Euclid Av	54,346	Schedule	Weekdays only
985	University City; UC San Diego Central Campus station	Torrey Pines; Torreyana Rd & Science Park Rd	N Torrey Pines Rd	34,129	Schedule	Weekday peak only
992	Downtown San Diego; 4th Av & Broadway	San Diego; San Diego International Airport	Broadway / Harbor Dr	398,790	Schedule	Frequent service

=== Rural Routes ===
Route	Terminals		Via	Annual ridership (FY 2026)	Links	Notes
888	El Cajon; Parkway Plaza	Jacumba Hot Springs; Campo St & Old Hwy 80	Alpine / Guatay / Pine Valley / Campo	800	Schedule	Monday and Friday peak only; Operates flag stop service and off-route by appointment
891	El Cajon; El Cajon Transit Center	Borrego Springs; Christmas Cir & Palm Canyon Dr	Shelter Valley / Ramona	304	Schedule	Friday peak only; Operates flag stop service and off-route by appointment
892	El Cajon; El Cajon Transit Center	Borrego Springs; Christmas Cir & Palm Canyon Dr	Ranchita / Ramona	238	Schedule	Thursday peak only; Operates flag stop service and off-route by appointment
894	El Cajon; Parkway Plaza	Tecate; Tecate Rd & Thing Rd Campo; Hwy 94 & Buckman Springs Rd (Cameron Corners) Lake Morena; Lake Morena Dr & Gladiola Dr (Oak Shores Malt Shop)	Tecate / Campo / Morena Village	62,125	Schedule	Weekdays only; Operates flag stop service and off-route by appointment
