= SDSU Transit Center =

San Diego Trolley and bus station

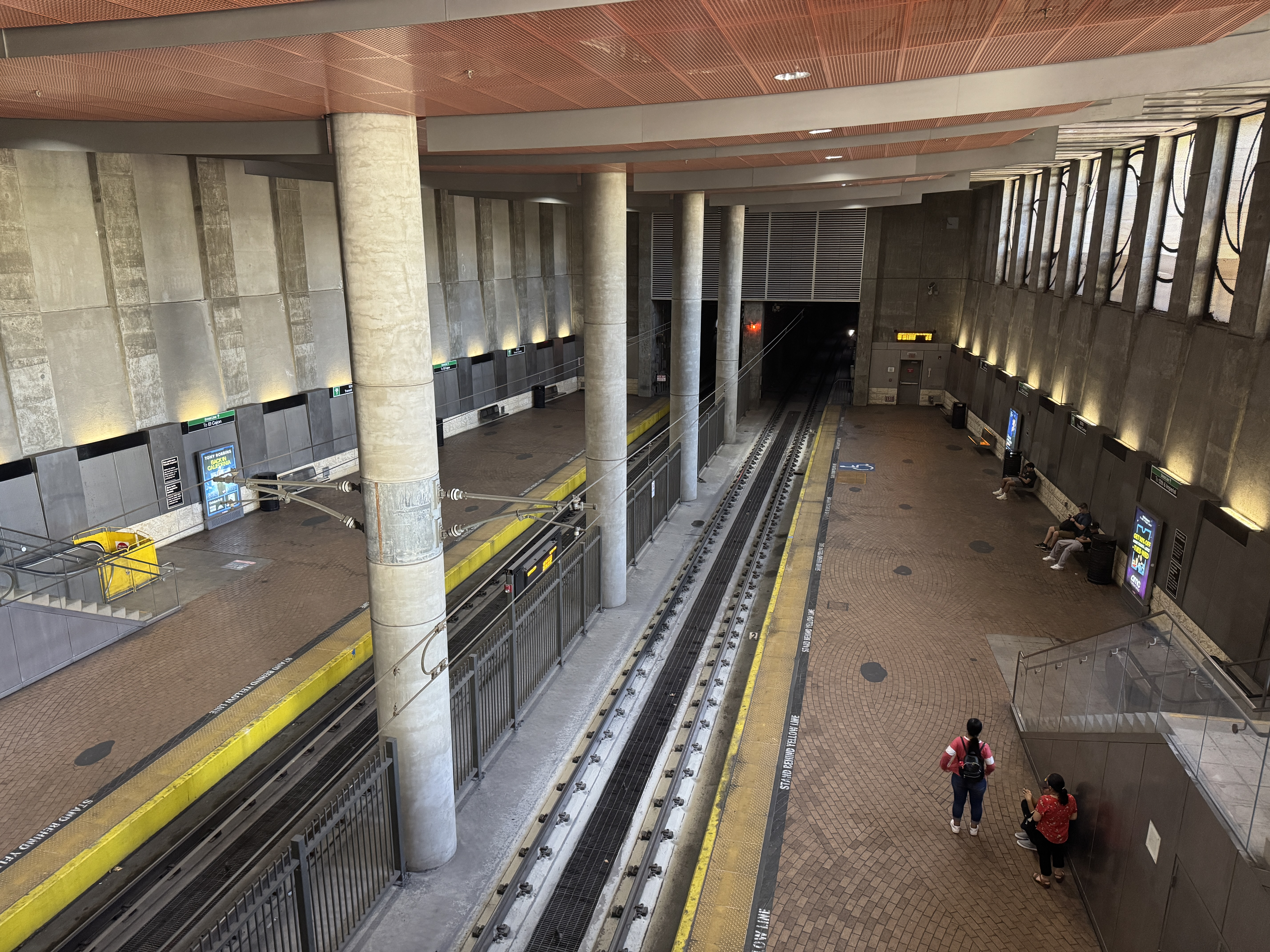
- SDSU Transit Center station platforms as seen from the mezzanine

General information
- Location: 5500 Campanile Drive; San Diego, California; United States
- Coordinates: 32°46′24″N 117°4′15″W
- Owner: San Diego Metropolitan Transit System
- Operator: San Diego Trolley
- Platforms: 2 side platforms
- Tracks: 2
- Connections: MTS: 11, 14, 115, Rapid 215, 856, 936, 955

Construction
- Structure type: Underground
- Parking: Paid lots nearby
- Accessible: Disabled access

History
- Opened: February 2005 (bus plaza); July 10, 2005 (trolley station)

Services
Preceding station	San Diego Trolley	Following station
Grantville toward 12th & Imperial	Green Line	UC San Diego Health East toward El Cajon
Preceding station	Rapid	Following station
College Ave toward Santa Fe Depot	Rapid 215	Terminus
Location

SDSU Transit Center is an underground San Diego Trolley station on the Green Line and a bus hub serving San Diego State University (SDSU). The station's entrances are located between College Avenue and Campanile Drive. It is the only underground station in the system and features side platforms. The bus plaza opened in February 2005, followed by the trolley platforms on July 10, 2005, when Green Line began service.

== History ==
In 1989, the San Diego Metropolitan Transit Development Board (now the San Diego Metropolitan Transit System) began planning the 5.6-mile (9 km) Mission Valley East extension to link the existing Blue and Orange lines. The $506 million project was routed near the SDSU campus, and university officials viewed the line as an opportunity to connect the campus directly to downtown, its surrounding neighborhoods and the nearby San Diego Stadium (now Snapdragon Stadium) used by the school's football team.

Initial plans considered 11 or 12 possible alignments, most of which bypassed the SDSU campus or placed a station at its northern edge near Interstate 8. That location would have placed the station about 400 feet (120 m) below campus, connected by stairs or elevators. SDSU officials lobbied for a centrally located station within campus, arguing that a peripheral station located far below campus would discourage ridership. The Metropolitan Transit Development Board (MTDB) resisted tunneling because it added an estimated $40–50 million to costs, but were persuaded by campus leaders and a study from URS Corporation showing that most of the tunnel could be built using cut-and-cover techniques under existing roadways, and the new Austrian tunneling method could be used when the line passed under campus buildings. After nearly a decade of debate, the MTDB approved the tunnel alignment in the late 1990s. The SDSU station ultimately cost $103 million to build.

Construction on the Mission Valley East extension began in 1999. To minimize disruption, SDSU secured an agreement to suspend work during the first three weeks of each semester and during finals. Pedestrian and vehicle access was maintained through detours and a temporary bridge spanning the excavation site. The bus plaza opened in February 2005, and the trolley platforms followed on July 10, 2005, when Green Line service began.

On June 29, 2011, the station was dedicated to Leon Williams, an SDSU alumnus and longtime public official. Along with former state senator Jim Mills, Williams was instrumental in developing the modern San Diego Metropolitan Transit System and in securing the station's central underground location.

== Construction and design ==
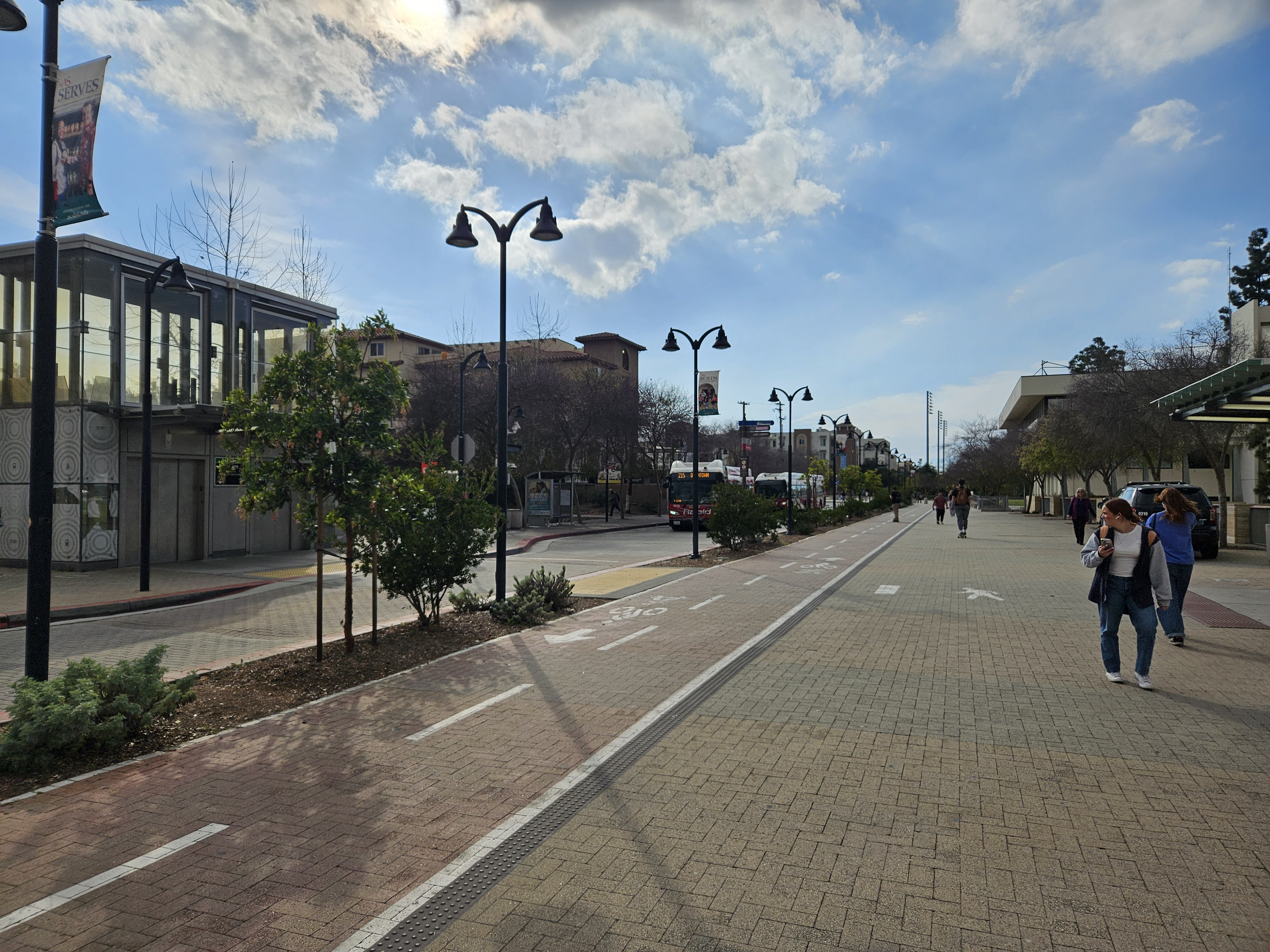
The bus station at SDSU Transit Center

The tunnel extends 4,000 feet (1,219 m) in total, with 2,915 feet (888 m) built using the cut-and-cover method, which involved removing and restoring surface roads above the trench. The remaining 1,085 feet (331 m) was excavated with the new Austrian tunneling method, which uses the surrounding rock mass for stabilization. The station lies about 55 feet (17 m) below ground and covers 50,000 square feet (4,600 m^{2}). To minimize disruption, construction paused during the first weeks of each semester and during finals.

The station was designed by ZGF Architects with engineering support from URS Corporation, with assistance from INCA Engineers as structural engineer, William J. Yang and Associates as mechanical and electrical engineer, and Hatch Mott MacDonald as tunnel engineer.

The station features two 360 feet (110 m) side platforms, long enough for four-car trains, with curved travertine and limestone walls taper its width from 20 feet (6.1 m) at the center to 12 feet (3.7 m) at each end. Natural light enters through 20 clerestory window openings on the north wall, which is exposed to a sloping plaza known as Aztec Green. Glass-sided elevator shafts also channel daylight to the mezzanine and platforms. The exterior wall is clad in gold travertine with planters and trellises to integrate with the campus landscape.

Interior finishes include stone and stainless steel panels along the lower walls, perforated metal ceiling panels over acoustic insulation, and serpentine blue cold-cathode lighting. The platforms feature a wavy brick pattern designed to resemble a riverbed. Public art by Anne Mudge includes the suspended stainless steel sculpture TapRoots, representing the university's ties to the community, and "galaxy spiral" screens that decorate the station's openings. Granite stones etched with 60 cultural and academic symbols interrupt the brick floor pattern to symbolize the impact of ideas. Additional art and design features are located throughout the upper levels, which are accessible by elevators, stairways, and escalators.

== Bus connections ==
The SDSU Transit Center includes a ground-level bus plaza served by several routes. These include Rapid 215 to downtown San Diego via El Cajon Boulevard, as well as local routes 11, 14, 115, 856, 936, and 955.

== See also ==
- List of San Diego Trolley stations
