= Washington Street station (San Diego Trolley) =

San Diego Trolley station

Washington Street
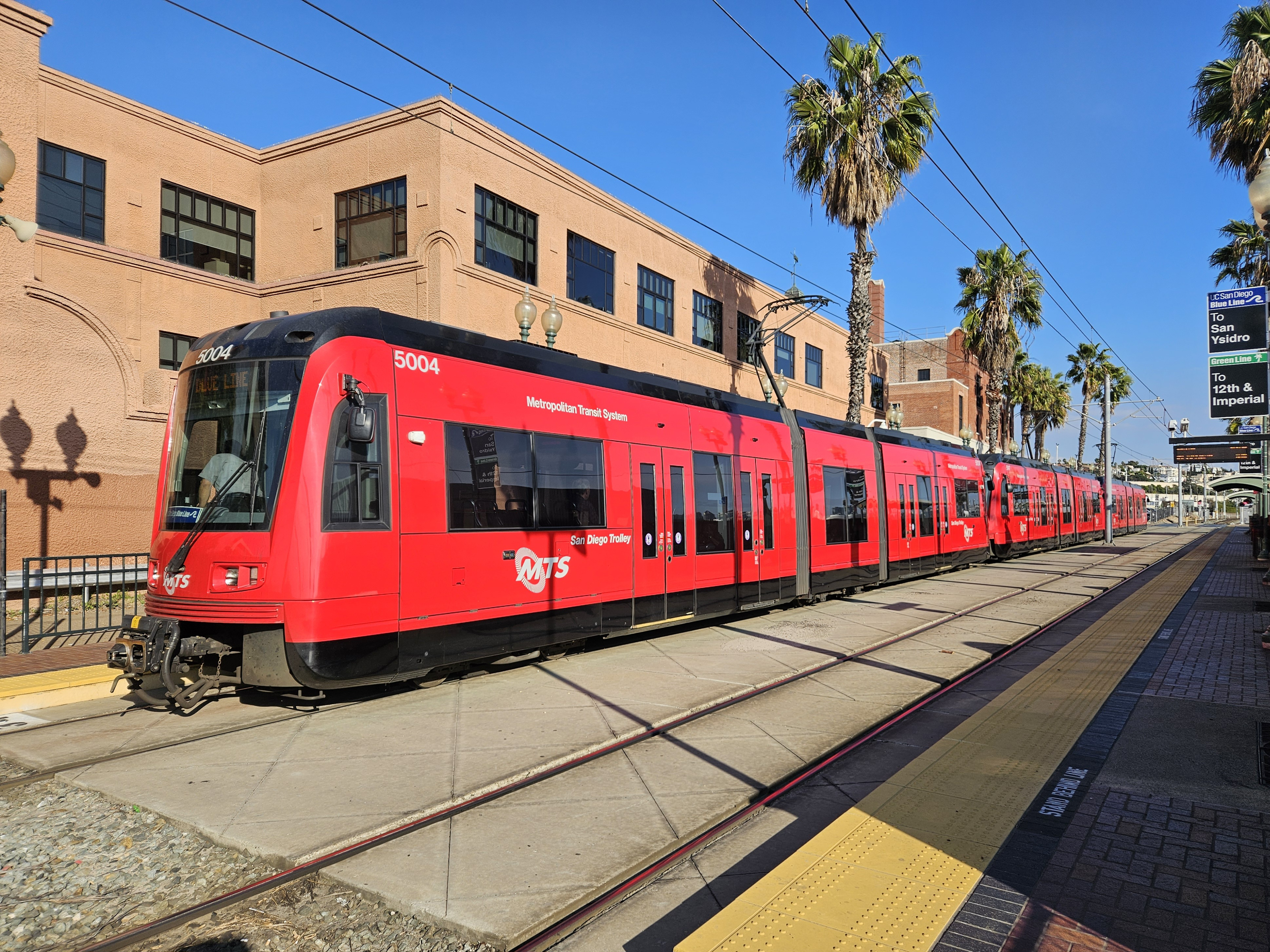
- Washington Street station in 2024

General information
- Location: 2136 West Washington Street; San Diego, California; United States
- Coordinates: 32°44′30″N 117°11′01″W
- Owner: San Diego Metropolitan Transit System
- Operator: San Diego Trolley
- Line: Surf Line
- Platforms: 2 side platforms
- Tracks: 2
- Connections: MTS: 10

Construction
- Structure type: At-grade
- Accessible: Disabled access

History
- Opened: June 16, 1996
- Rebuilt: 2011

Services
Preceding station	San Diego Trolley	Following station
Old Town toward UTC	Blue Line	Middletown toward San Ysidro
Old Town toward El Cajon	Green Line	Middletown toward 12th & Imperial
Old Town toward Balboa Avenue	Special Event Line	Middletown toward 12th & Imperial
Track layout
Location

Washington Street station is an at-grade station on the Blue Line and Green Line of the San Diego Trolley system. It is located along the Surf Line right of way at West Washington Street near its intersection with Pacific Highway, in a largely industrial area of San Diego. The stop also serves Marine Corps Recruit Depot San Diego and the Mission Hills neighborhood, which includes a variety of medium-density housing within blocks of the station.

This station opened on June 16, 1996, as part of the North/South Line (later renamed the Blue Line) extension to the Old Town Transit Center. On July 2, 2011, the station was closed for renovations as part of the Trolley Renewal Project. It was originally supposed to reopen by early September, but numerous construction issues pushed the reopening to November 24, 2011.

The stone wall on the Southbound side of the station was destroyed in the Summer of 2024 and instead replaced with a fence side with remnants of the old wall.

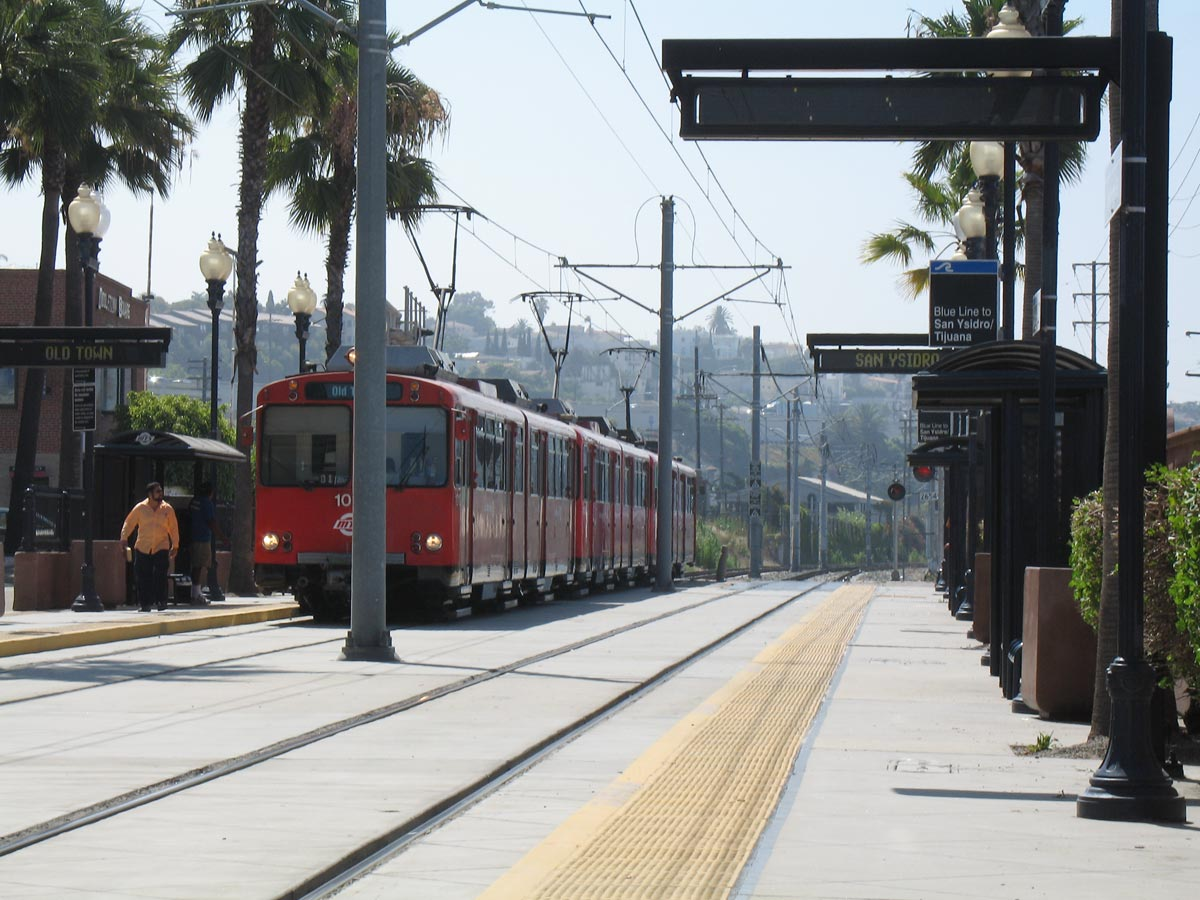
Washington Street station in 2008

== Station layout ==
There are four tracks, two for the trolley station and two passing tracks for commuter, intercity, and BNSF freight service.

== See also ==
- List of San Diego Trolley stations
