= Pacific Fleet =

Pacific Fleet may refer to:

- British Pacific Fleet, a Royal Navy formation which saw action against Japan during the Second World War
- East Asia Squadron, an Imperial German Navy cruiser squadron which operated mainly in the Pacific Ocean between the mid-1890s until 1914
- Maritime Forces Pacific, the fleet training and operational readiness division of the Royal Canadian Navy in the Pacific Ocean
- Pacific Fleet (Russia), the Russian Navy fleet in the Pacific Ocean
- Pacific Fleet station, a station of the Blue Line on the San Diego Trolley
- Pacific Naval Force, the Mexican Navy's presence in the Pacific Ocean
- Pacific Reserve Fleet, a United States Navy reserve fleet previously designated the Nineteenth Fleet
- United States Pacific Fleet, a Pacific Ocean theater-level component command of the United States Navy
