= Middletown station (San Diego Trolley) =

San Diego Trolley station

Middletown
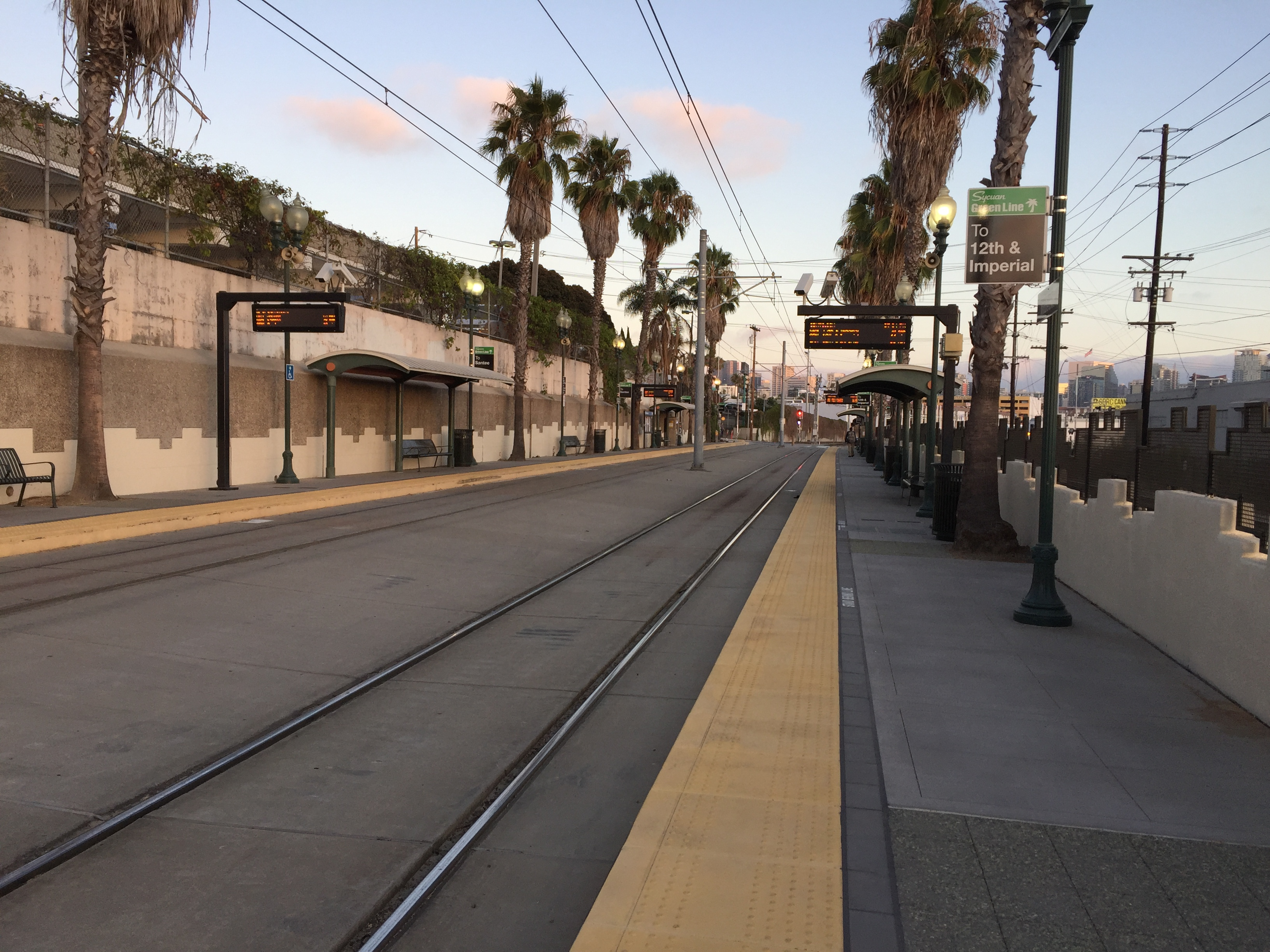
- Middletown station in 2019

General information
- Location: 1396 Palm Street; San Diego, California; United States
- Coordinates: 32°43′59″N 117°10′28″W
- Owner: San Diego Metropolitan Transit System
- Operator: San Diego Trolley
- Line: Surf Line
- Platforms: 2 side platforms
- Tracks: 2
- Connections: San Diego International Airport (via Rental Car Shuttle)

Construction
- Structure type: At-grade
- Accessible: Disabled access

History
- Opened: June 16, 1996
- Rebuilt: 2012

Services
Preceding station	San Diego Trolley	Following station
Washington Street toward UTC	Blue Line	County Center/Little Italy toward San Ysidro
Washington Street toward El Cajon	Green Line	County Center/Little Italy toward 12th & Imperial
Washington Street toward Balboa Avenue	Special Event Line	County Center/Little Italy toward 12th & Imperial
Track layout
Location

Middletown station is an at-grade station on the Blue Line and Green Line of the San Diego Trolley system. It is located along the Surf Line right of way at West Palm Street, between Pacific Highway and Kettner Boulevard, in the Middletown neighborhood of San Diego, which includes a variety of medium-density housing within blocks of the station. The station offers a connection to San Diego International Airport via a shuttle stop one block away from this station.

== History ==
This station opened on June 16, 1996, as part of the North/South Line (later renamed the Blue Line) extension to Old Town Transit Center. The station was closed from May 21 through August 2012 for renovations as part of the Trolley Renewal Project.

== Station layout ==
There are four tracks, two for the trolley station and two passing tracks for commuter, intercity, and BNSF freight service.

== Airport connection ==
San Diego International Airport is accessible from this station. In July 2015, the airport added a stop near this station to buses that operate between the terminals and the airport's rental car center. Passengers board the shuttle at a specially marked bus shelter near the corner of Admiral Boland Way and West Palm Street, which is about 900 feet (270 m) southwest of the station along West Palm Street.

== See also ==
- List of San Diego Trolley stations
