= Tecolote Road station =

San Diego Trolley station

Tecolote Road
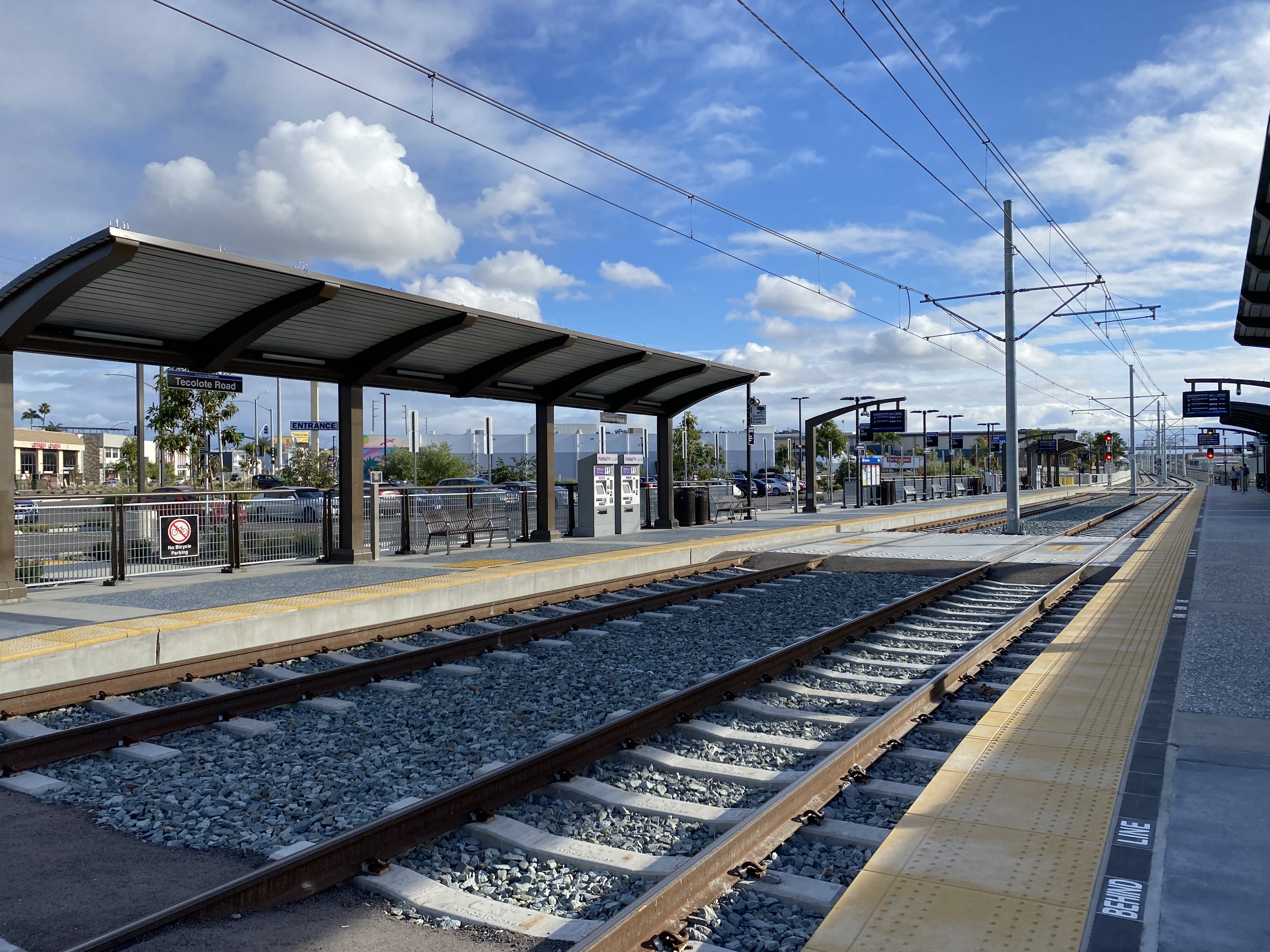
- Tecolote Road station platform

General information
- Location: 1364 West Morena Boulevard; San Diego, California; United States
- Coordinates: 32°46′11″N 117°12′18″W
- Owner: San Diego Metropolitan Transit System
- Operator: San Diego Trolley
- Platforms: 2 side platforms
- Tracks: 2

Construction
- Structure type: At-grade
- Parking: 279 spaces
- Cycle facilities: 4 lockers
- Accessible: Disabled access

Other information
- Station code: 77770, 77771

History
- Opened: November 21, 2021

Services
Preceding station	San Diego Trolley	Following station
Clairemont Drive toward UTC	Blue Line	Old Town toward San Ysidro
Clairemont Drive toward Balboa Avenue	Special Event Line	Old Town toward 12th & Imperial
Location

Tecolote Road station is a San Diego Trolley station in San Diego, California. The station is located adjacent to the 5 Freeway/Tecolote Road interchange. It was developed as a station for the Mid-Coast Trolley extension project, which is an extension for the Blue Line. The station has 279 parking spaces.
