= Superloop =

Superloop may refer to:

- SuperLoop, a bus system, San Diego, California, US
- Superloop (company), an Australian telecommunications company
  - Superloop Adelaide 500, sponsored motor racing event
- London Superloop, a bus route network, UK
- Super Loops, later Fire Ball, an amusement ride
- SuperLOOP, a waterslide similar to the AquaLoop
- A bare metal firmware architecture in which a single infinite loop repeatedly executes all tasks in sequence
