= Steinaker =

Steinaker may refer to:

- Donald B. Steinaker (1922-1942), a United States Marine Corps private first class and Navy Cross recipient
- Steinaker State Park, a state park in Utah in the United States
- USS Steinaker, the name of more than one United States Navy ship
