= Barrio Logan station =

San Diego Trolley station

Barrio Logan
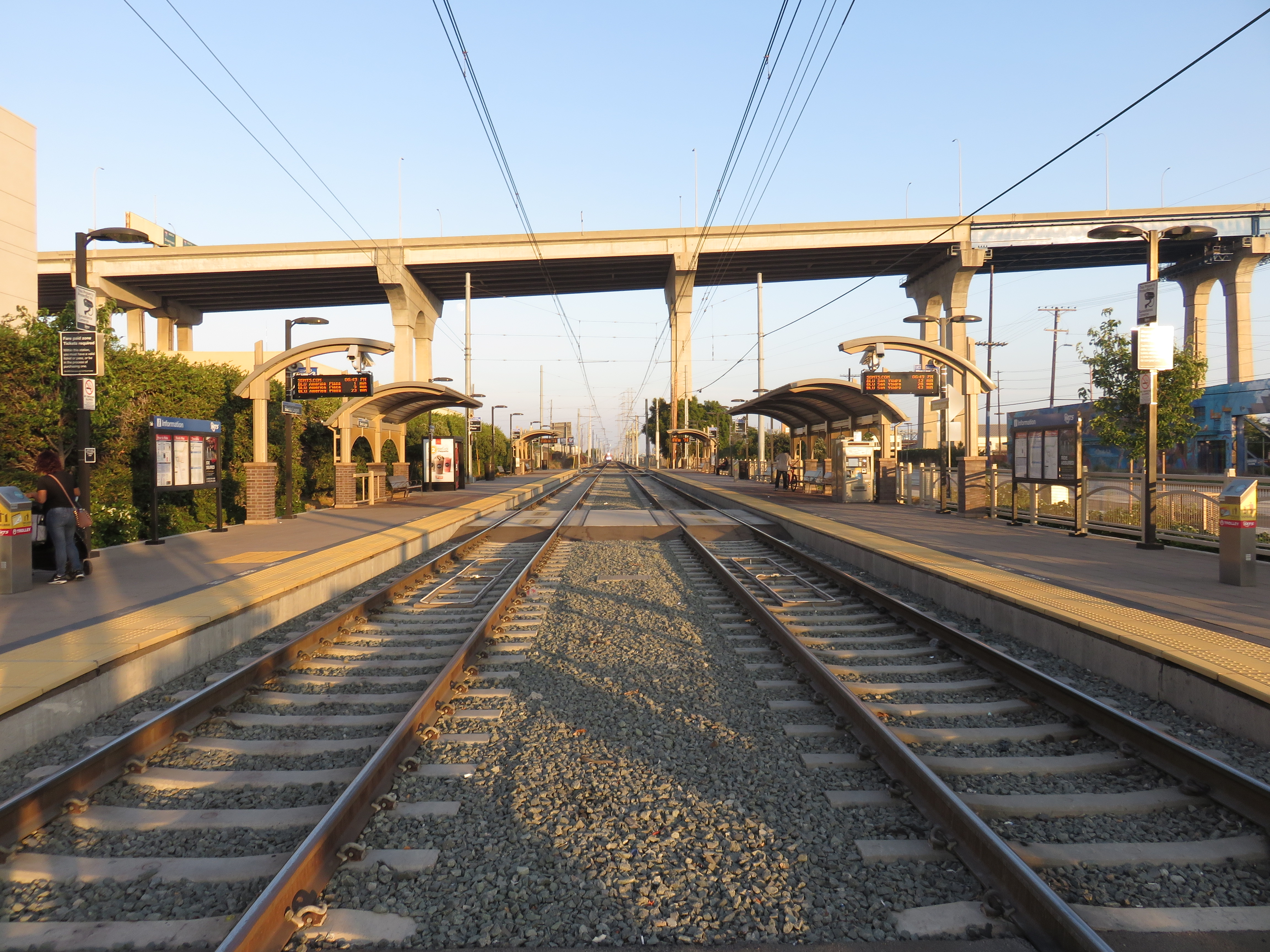
- The station in 2018, with part of the San Diego–Coronado Bridge in the background.

General information
- Location: 1910 Harbor Drive; San Diego, California; United States
- Coordinates: 32°41′53″N 117°08′49″W
- Owner: San Diego Metropolitan Transit System
- Operator: San Diego Trolley
- Line: SD&AE Main Line
- Platforms: 2 side platforms
- Tracks: 2

Construction
- Structure type: At-grade
- Cycle facilities: 8 rack spaces, 2 lockers
- Accessible: Disabled access

Other information
- Station code: 75018, 75019

History
- Opened: July 26, 1981
- Rebuilt: 2014

Services
Preceding station	San Diego Trolley	Following station
12th & Imperial toward UTC	Blue Line	Harborside toward San Ysidro
Location

Barrio Logan station is a station on the Blue Line of the San Diego Trolley located near the intersection of César E. Chávez Parkway (formerly Crosby Street) and Harbor Drive in the Logan Heights neighborhood of San Diego. The station's name is the Spanish translation of "Logan neighborhood" and the station primarily serves the corresponding Hispanic neighborhood. The stop is located near Chicano Park, famous for its artwork and legacy of protests for minority rights.

== History ==
Barrio Logan opened as part of the initial 15.9-mile (25.6 km) "South Line" of the San Diego Trolley system on July 26, 1981, operating from San Ysidro north to downtown San Diego using the main line tracks of the San Diego and Arizona Eastern Railway.

This station was renovated, starting September 28, 2013 as part of the Trolley Renewal Project; it reopened with a renovated station platform in early August 2014.

== See also ==
- List of San Diego Trolley stations
