= Purple Line (San Diego Trolley) =

Proposed commuter rail line in San Diego County, California, United States

Overview
- Status: Announced
- Owner: SANDAG
- Locale: San Diego County, California, United States
- Stations: 12 (proposed)

Service
- Type: Commuter rail (2021 plan) or light rail (2025 plan)
- System: San Diego Trolley
- Route number: 582 (in internal documents only)
- Operator: San Diego Trolley, Inc.

History
- Planned opening: 2050 (proposed, as of 2025)
- 2011: Draft 2050 Regional Transportation Plan published
- 2019: Project announced as the Purple Line
- 2021: Mode changed from light rail to commuter rail
- 2025: Reverted to light rail

Technical
- Line length: 30.5 mi (49.1 km)
- Track gauge: 4 ft 8 1/2 in (1,435 mm) standard gauge
- Electrification: Presumably Overhead line, 600 V DC for light rail
- Operating speed: 110 mph (177 km/h) (commuter rail)

The Purple Line is a commuter rail or light rail line proposed by the San Diego Association of Governments (SANDAG) as part of the San Diego Trolley system. It would run from San Ysidro Transit Center at the Mexico–United States border to Kearny Mesa with a possible extension to Carmel Valley. Most of it would run along a similar route to I-805. The Purple Line could include up to 12 stations, a new maintenance facility, and a storage yard.

Projected ridership on the Purple Line was previously expected to be over 40,000 daily trips when previously studied as a light rail line with a peak hour frequency of 7–10 minutes. With its mode being changed to higher-speed and higher-capacity commuter rail, a new study will eventually be conducted to determine how many more daily trips will be generated. The line is proposed to be opened in 2035 if funding is available at a proposed total project cost of $15.56B.

== History ==
=== Planning ===
In April 2011, the San Diego Association of Governments (SANDAG) released a draft of its 2050 Regional Transportation Plan, which the SANDAG board of directors approved on October 28, 2011. An inland Trolley line from San Ysidro to Kearny Mesa, though not yet called the Purple Line, was included in the plan.

==== Line name announced ====
In April 2019, SANDAG approved the final version of a November ballot initiative to increase the countywide sales tax by a half-cent, which further detailed future transit plans and specifically mentioned and estimated the cost to build the proposed San Ysidro-Kearny Mesa trolley extension. It was then given its official title, the Purple Line.

==== Mode changed from light rail to commuter rail ====
In 2021, SANDAG released their 2021 Regional Plan, in which they updated the mode of the Purple Line proposal from light rail to commuter rail. As a commuter rail line, trains could run as fast as 110 miles per hour (180 km/h).

==== Controversial reversion to light rail ====
In 2025, the Purple Line was reverted from a commuter rail line to a regular light rail line, with the scope of the route being reduced to Mission Valley to the border. Moreover, opening of the route would be scheduled for 2050. The reduction of scope of the plan was part of SANDAG shifting away from building more transit projects in favor of focusing on existing infrastructure.

The abandoning of commuter rail, as well as the 15-year delay in building the Purple Line, has been criticized by writers at the San Diego Union-Tribune, as well as transit advocacy group RideSD, because light rail would be slower than commuter rail, because the light rail proposal would not serve major destinations like UCSD and Sorrento Valley, and because SANDAG's plans are seen as prioritizing freeway lines over public transit. Another Union-Tribune writer also noted that Sorrento Valley would be more important for San Diego's long-term growth than downtown, and so, should be served by the Purple Line.

== Potential stations ==
Potential stations according to the SANDAG plan could include:

- San Ysidro Transit Center, San Ysidro
- Iris Avenue, Otay Mesa West
- Orange Avenue/4th Avenue, Chula Vista
- E Street/4th Avenue, Chula Vista
- East Plaza Boulevard/Highland Avenue, National City
- Euclid Avenue (transfer to Orange Line), Southeast San Diego
- Dwight Street/43rd Street, City Heights
- Stadium station (transfer to Green Line), Mission Valley
- Anrae Street/Mesa College Drive, Birdland
- Clairemont Mesa Boulevard/Ruffner Street, Kearny Mesa
- UTC Transit Center, University City
- Mira Mesa Boulevard/Pacific Heights Boulevard, Sorrento Valley
