= Harborside station (San Diego Trolley) =

San Diego Trolley station

Harborside
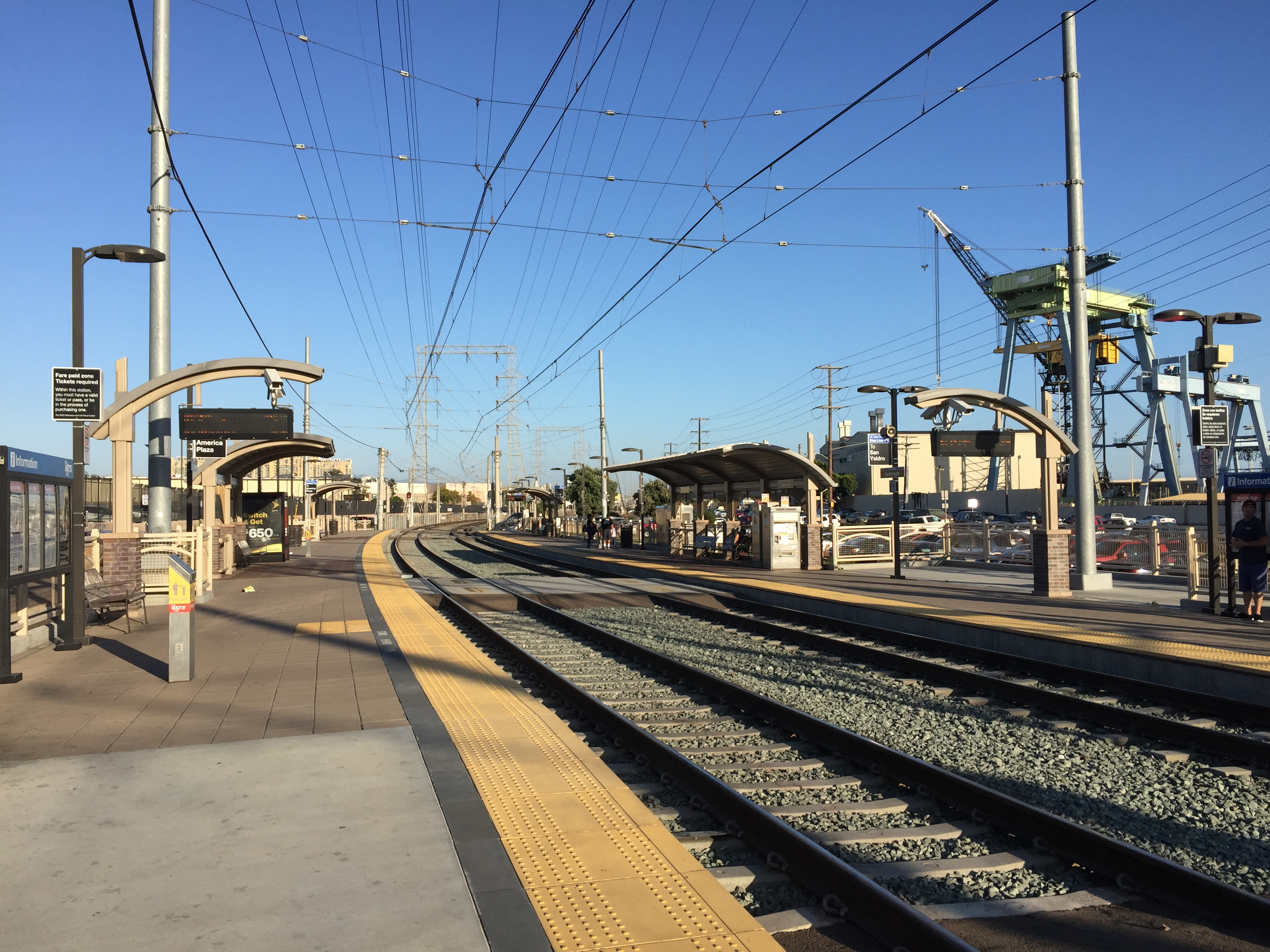
- Harborside station platforms in 2019

General information
- Location: 1325 South 28th Street; San Diego, California; United States
- Coordinates: 32°41′33″N 117°08′01″W
- Owner: San Diego Metropolitan Transit System
- Operator: San Diego Trolley
- Line: SD&AE Main Line
- Platforms: 2 side platforms
- Tracks: 2

Construction
- Structure type: At-grade
- Cycle facilities: 8 rack spaces, 2 lockers
- Accessible: Disabled access

Other information
- Station code: 75104, 75105

History
- Opened: July 26, 1981
- Rebuilt: 2014

Services
Preceding station	San Diego Trolley	Following station
Barrio Logan toward UTC	Blue Line	Pacific Fleet toward San Ysidro
Location

Harborside station is a station on the Blue Line of the San Diego Trolley located near the intersection of 28th Street and Harbor Drive in the Logan Heights neighborhood of San Diego. It serves the Logan Heights residential neighborhood as well as the nearby harbor and industrial area.

== History ==
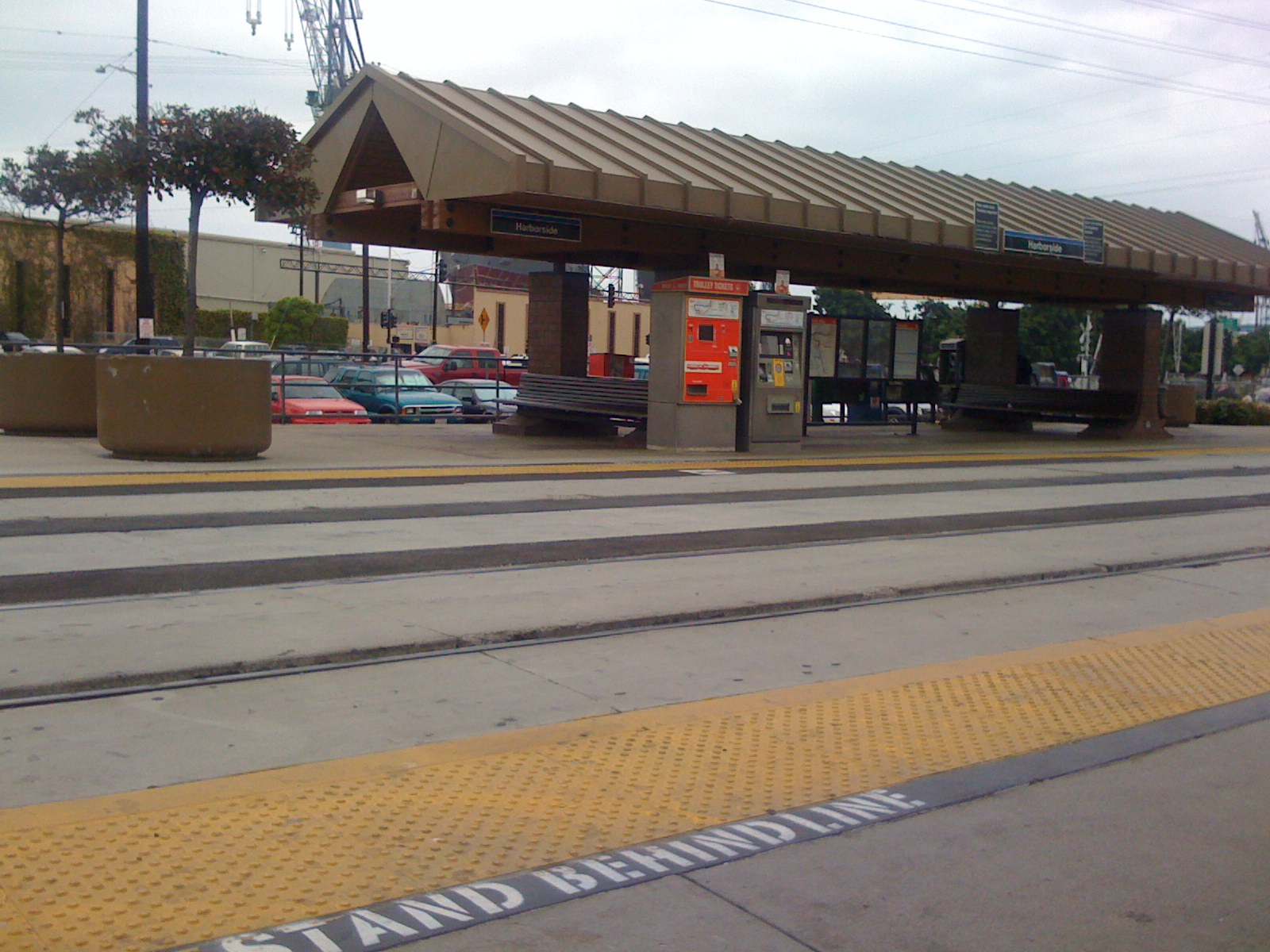
Harborside station in 2008, prior to the renovation

Harborside opened as part of the initial 15.9-mile (25.6 km) "South Line" of the San Diego Trolley system on July 26, 1981, operating from San Ysidro north to downtown San Diego using the main line tracks of the San Diego and Arizona Eastern Railway.

This station was renovated, starting September 26, 2013, as part of the Trolley Renewal Project; it reopened with a renovated station platform in mid August 2014.

== See also ==
- List of San Diego Trolley stations
