= Clairemont Drive station =

San Diego Trolley station

Clairemont Drive
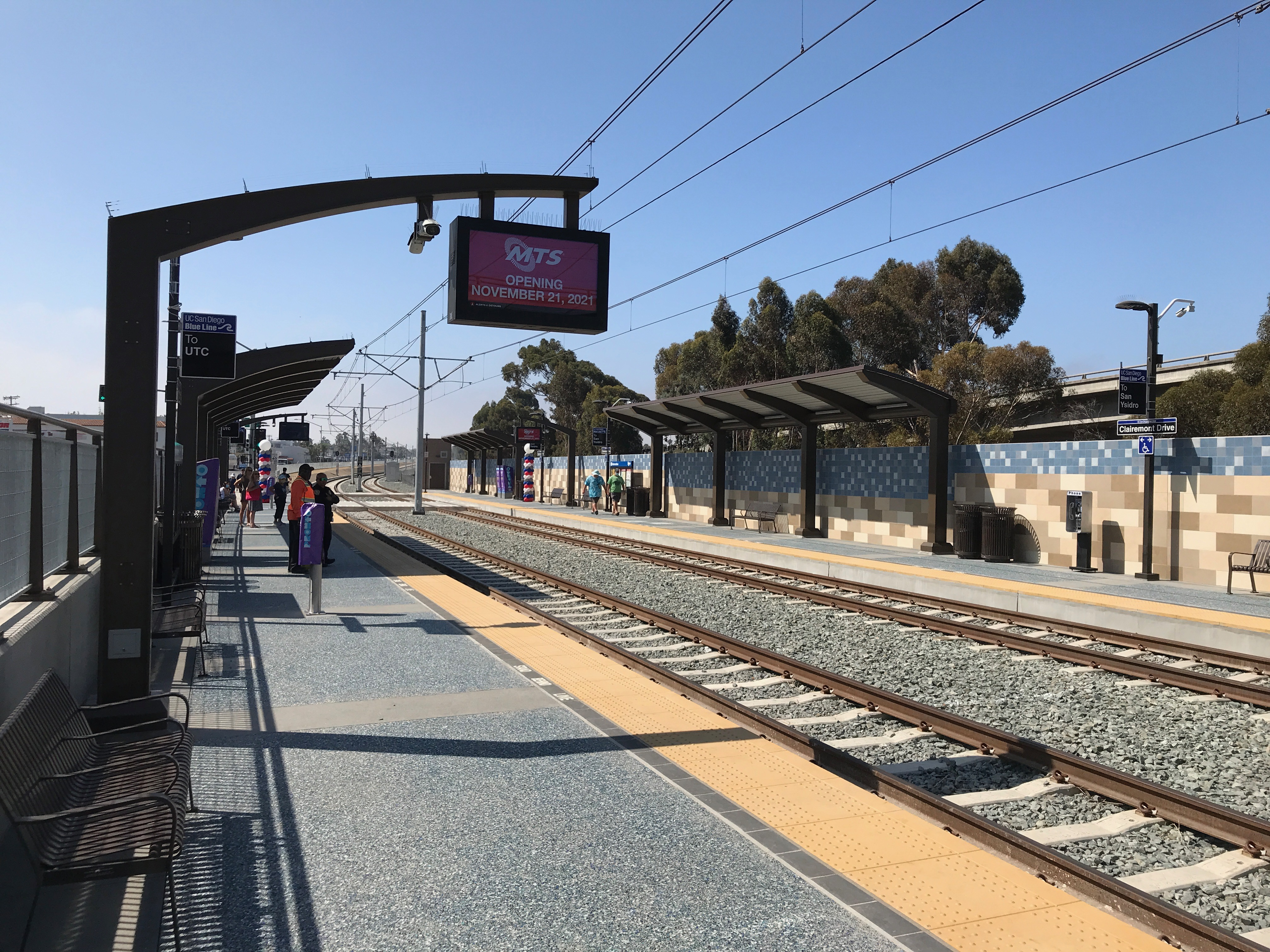
- Clairemont Drive station platform

General information
- Location: 2680 Morena Boulevard; San Diego, California; United States
- Coordinates: 32°47′25″N 117°12′22″W
- Owner: San Diego Metropolitan Transit System
- Operator: San Diego Trolley
- Platforms: 2 side platforms
- Tracks: 2
- Connections: MTS: 105

Construction
- Structure type: At-grade
- Cycle facilities: 4 lockers
- Accessible: Disabled access

Other information
- Station code: 77772, 77773

History
- Opened: November 21, 2021

Services
Preceding station	San Diego Trolley	Following station
Balboa Avenue toward UTC	Blue Line	Tecolote Road toward San Ysidro
Balboa Avenue Terminus	Special Event Line	Tecolote Road toward 12th & Imperial
Location

Clairemont Drive station is an at-grade San Diego Trolley station in San Diego, California. The station platform is located on the westside of Morena Boulevard where the tracks are, while the parking structure will be built across the street on the eastside of Morena between Ingulf Street and Clairemont Drive. Service began on November 21, 2021 after the completion of the Blue Line Mid-Coast Trolley extension project.
