= Otay Mesa Transit Center =

Bus station in San Diego, California

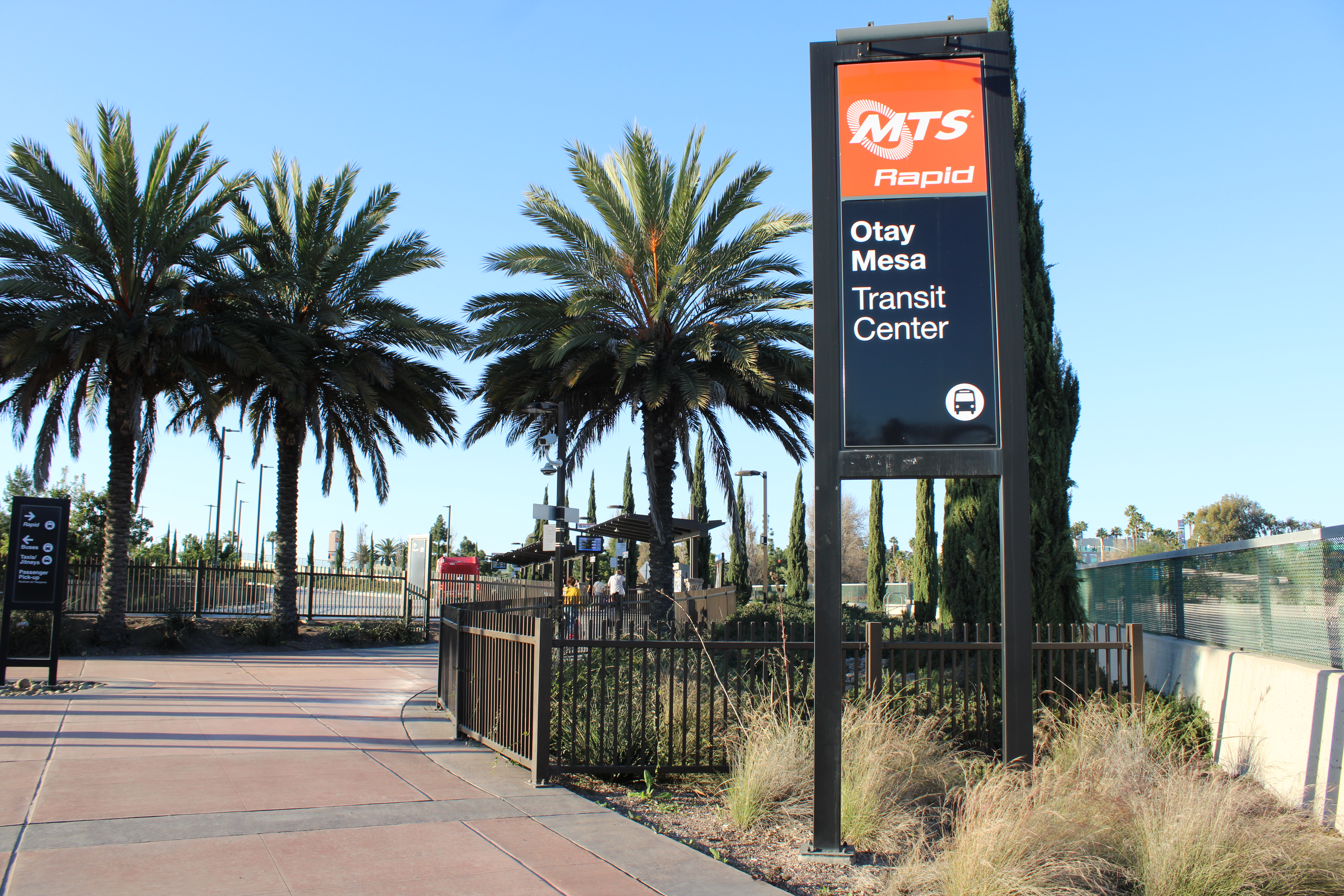
- Otay Mesa Transit Center in 2026

General information
- Location: 9475 Nicola Tesla Ct; San Diego, California; United States
- Coordinates: 32°33′12″N 116°56′24″W
- Operator: San Diego Metropolitan Transit System
- Platforms: 2
- Bus stands: 6
- Connections: MTS: 905, 909

Construction
- Accessible: Yes

History
- Opened: January 27, 2019

Services
| Preceding station | Rapid | Following station |
|---|---|---|
| Millenia toward Santa Fe Depot | Rapid 225 | Terminus |
| Caliente Avenue toward Imperial Beach | Rapid 227 | Terminus |
Location

Otay Mesa Transit Center is a bus station in the Otay Mesa neighborhood of San Diego. It is located adjacent to the Otay Mesa Port of Entry.

It is a station on the MTS Rapid network, serving as the termini of both Rapid 225 and 227. It also serves as a hub for MTS local buses in the Otay Mesa area such as routes 905 and 909.

== History ==
The new station was planned as part of the South Bay Rapid project (later numbered Rapid 225), a bus rapid transit line that would connect the Otay Mesa Port of Entry with eastern Chula Vista and downtown San Diego. Bus service would later commence on January 27, 2019 after Rapid 225 service was fully opened beyond East Palomar Transit Station. The station would be temporarily closed for six months on September 20, 2020 to facilitate construction of a pedestrian ramp which would connect the transit center directly to the nearby Otay Mesa Port of Entry.

Otay Mesa Transit Center later became the eastern terminus of Rapid 227 when it began service on October 15, 2023, connecting Otay Mesa to Iris Avenue Transit Center and Imperial Beach and replacing the former route 950 express bus which ran the Otay Mesa–Iris Avenue route prior.
