= Rapid (San Diego) =

Bus Rapid Transit System

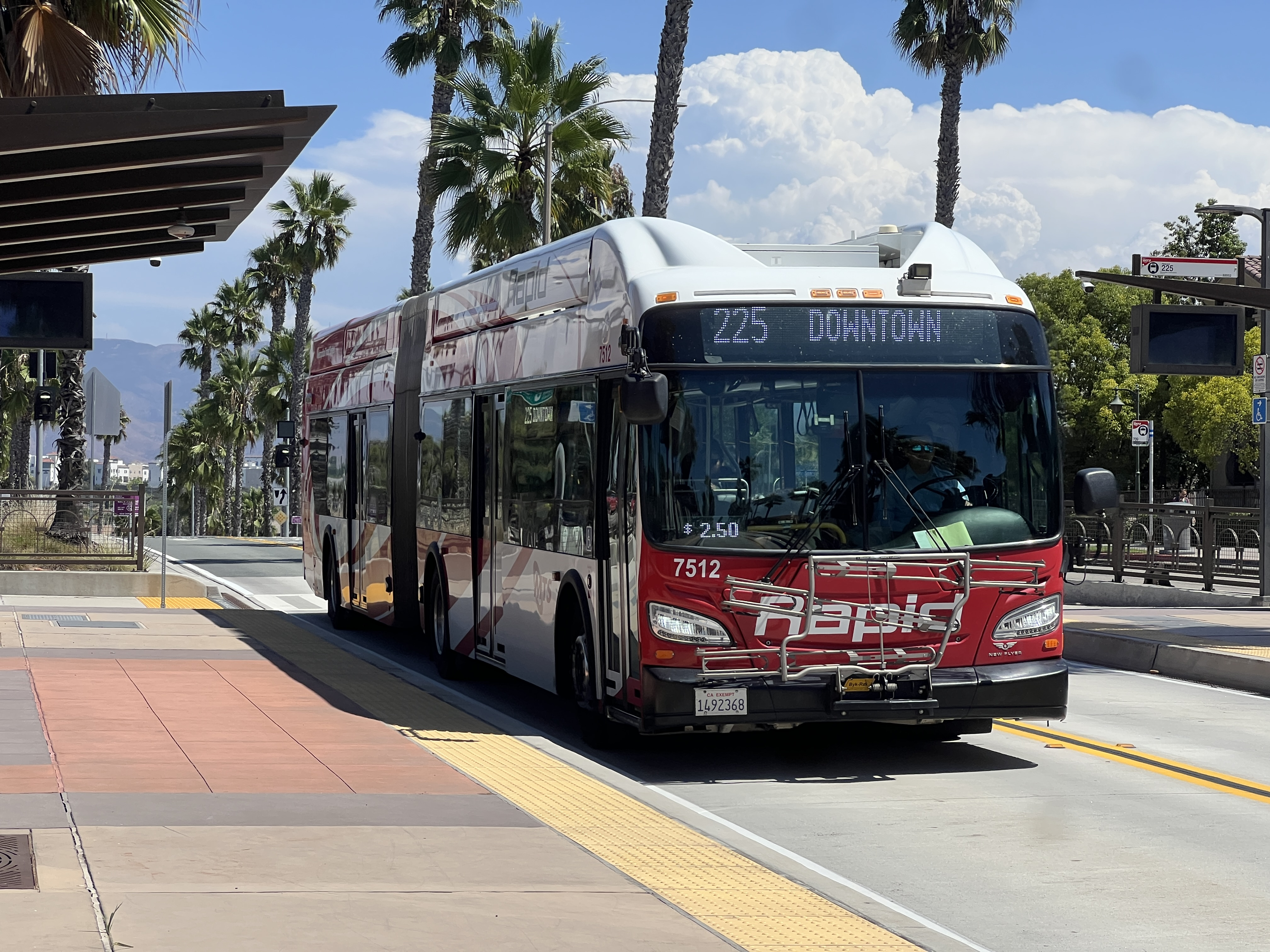
- Bus at Lomas Verdes Station
- Parent: San Diego Metropolitan Transit System (MTS); San Diego Association of Governments (SANDAG)
- Founded: 2002 (start of BRT planning by SANDAG)
- Commenced operation: June 8, 2014; 12 years ago
- Locale: San Diego County, California
- Service type: Bus rapid transit
- Routes: 10
- Hubs: UTC Transit Center; City College station; Santa Fe Depot; Otay Mesa Transit Center; Iris Avenue Transit Center
- Stations: 39
- Fleet: 77 New Flyer XN60; 12 New Flyer XE60; 24 MCI D4500
- Daily ridership: 23,899 (FY 2026)
- Annual ridership: 7,229,937 (FY 2026)
- Fuel type: Biogas, electric
- Operator: MTS (201, 202, 204, 215, 235, 237); Transdev (225, 227, 280, 290)
- Website: SDMTS Rapid website
System map
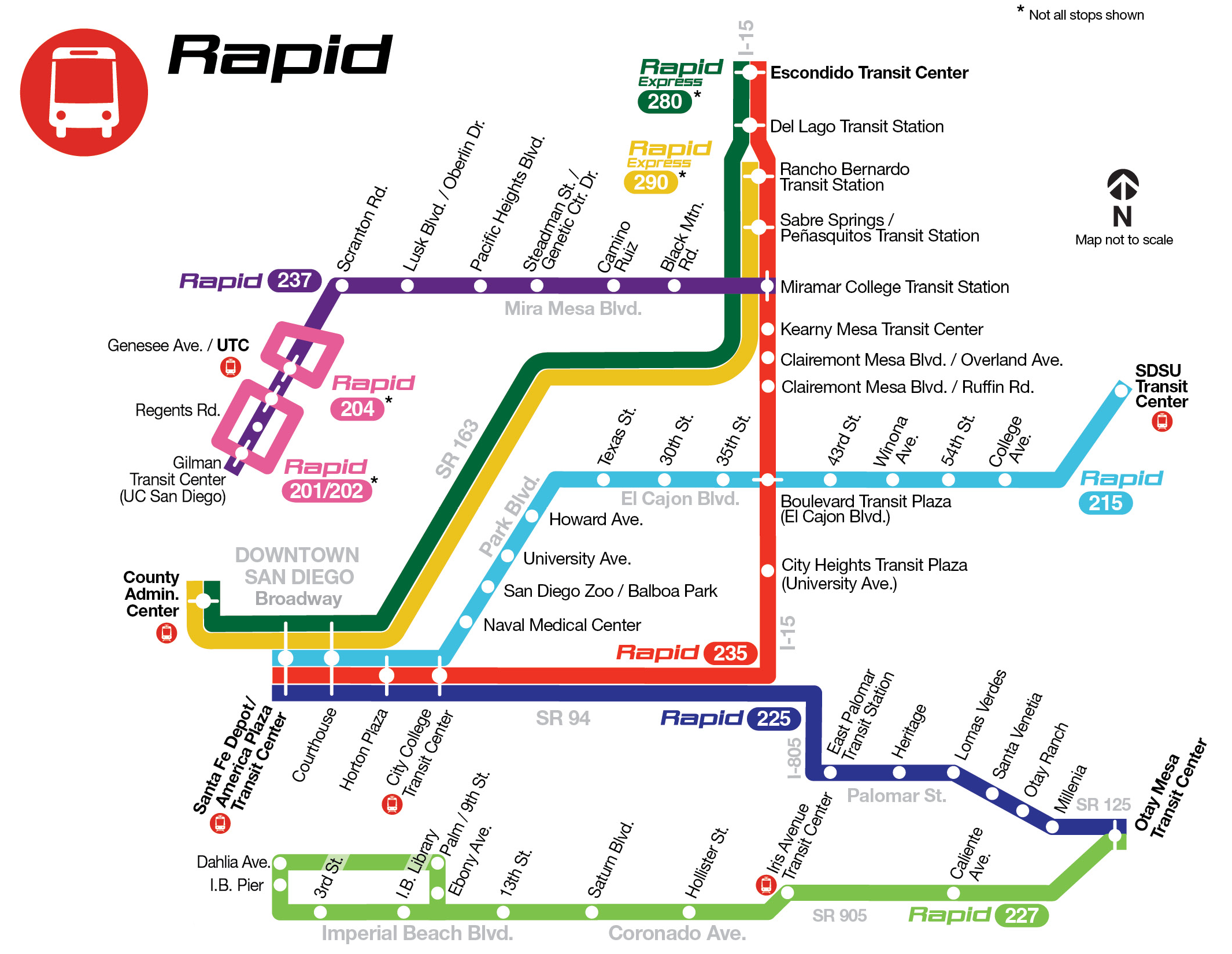

Rapid (stylized in italics) is a bus rapid transit system serving San Diego County, California. It is part of the San Diego Metropolitan Transit System (MTS). The system operates on the HOV lanes of Interstate 15 and 805, bus lanes on El Cajon Boulevard, and on busways in the medians of Interstate 15, Park Boulevard, and East Palomar Street.

The system is administered, built and managed by the San Diego Association of Governments (SANDAG). Planning for the initial "showcase" route began in 2002 with the commencement of an environmental review. It took 12 years and $238 million to get Rapid operational. Regular service began in summer 2014.

== History ==
=== Early Beginnings (1990–2006) ===
In the 1990s, an extension of the San Diego Trolley was studied along Interstate 15. However, projected low ridership, hilly terrain and high cost estimates shelved this proposal. It was instead decided to construct a HOV lane system with Direct Access Ramps and transit centers in proximity to these ramps. Construction on these lanes began by 2001 with the first phase (between SR 163 and Sabre Springs) opening for traffic in 2006. At the same time, another trolley proposal was studied in Otay Ranch, but it was also decided that a BRT system would be essential.

In July 2002, the San Diego Association of Governments (SANDAG), the county's planning organization, initiated the planning process for what would eventually become the Mid City route. An environmental review for this route would later be published in 2008.

=== The SuperLoop experiment (2007–2013) ===
To test the technology to be used on the system, in 2007, SANDAG selected a series of streets in University City to be fitted with transit signal priority, in addition to building stations with real-time arrival displays. These services, dubbed as SuperLoop, began by mid-2009.

The success of these routes resulted in the SuperLoop routes becoming permanent additions, and eventually led to SANDAG placing a large order of 60-foot CNG buses, and the start of construction of the rest of the network. All phases of the I-15 HOV investment project were finished by 2011. The Rapid branding was announced in 2013, with the new buses arriving in December of that year, with corridor testing and driver training beginning the following January.

=== In Service (2014–present) ===
On May 17, 2014, the buses were accepted for passenger occupation, and in-service testing began on route 20 during a record-breaking heatwave caused by the Santa Ana winds at the time. These buses were wrapped with a vinyl sticker containing the official slogan, all in an effort to promote the upcoming service. MTS also registered the rapidmts.com domain around this time (since merged into the main site). It was also announced that the service would begin at the next service change on June 8, 2014.

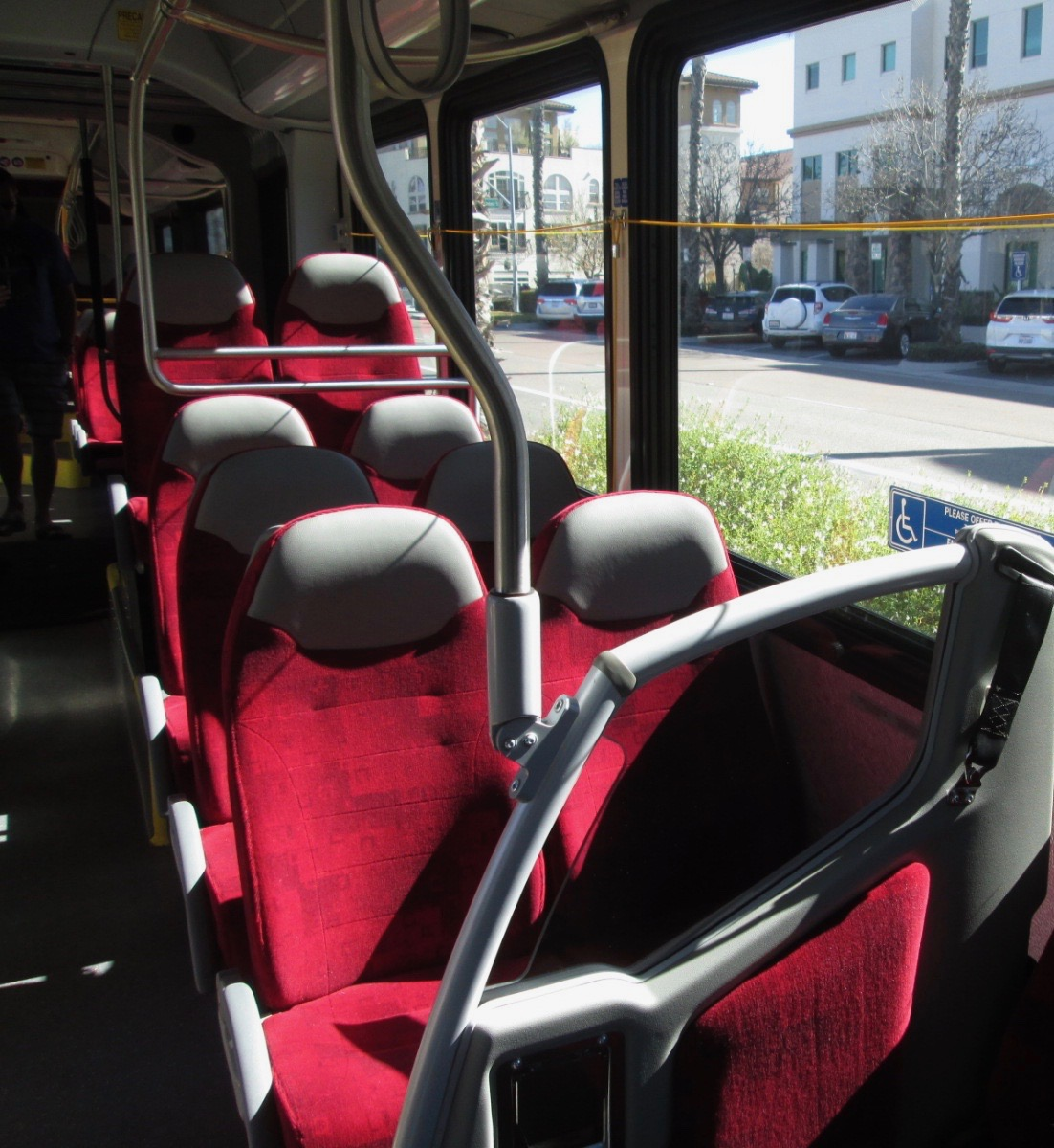
The Interior of a Rapid coach

At the same time, the existing Premium Express routes would gradually be phased out. Former route 810 would become Rapid 235 and supplemented by Rapid Express routes 280 and 290, while former route 880 would be replaced by Rapid 237. The remaining routes would be discontinued altogether with June 6, 2014, being the final date of operation for the Premium Express network. Rapid service formally began the following Sunday, June 8, 2014, on schedule. Free bus rides were offered on that day. Rapid Express service began the following day. It inherited the 26 already existing motorcoach buses.

On March 11, 2018, MTS placed the I-15 CenterLine median stations into commission. These were the first stations on the I-15 Rapid (Rapid 235) to feature light-rail style station platforms, shelters, and NextBus information displays, and the first to be implemented since the Mid-City Rapid guideway in 2014.

By 2019, the full network was implemented and in operation.

The routes have been described as a "diet trolleys", but critics claim that the limited amount of spending on BRT compared to highway spending shows SANDAG's emphasis on highway and automobile-based transportation.

==== COVID-19 pandemic precautions ====
In March 2020, the COVID-19 pandemic was declared. MTS began disinfecting vehicles as they return to the maintenance yards, and has begun sanitizing station platforms and installing handwashing stations at transit centers. MTS subsequently announced reductions to all Rapid services in April. There will be only 3 runs of Rapid 280, 2 runs of Rapid 290, 30 minute headways for Rapid 204, 225, 235 and 237, and 15 minute headways for the remainder. These schedules will remain in effect indefinitely.

On January 28, 2021, it was announced that MTS, in cooperation with the North County Transit District, would begin offering free rides for passengers en route to receive a COVID-19 vaccine, by carrying a confirmation paper for their appointment.

On March 1, 2021, MTS placed 24 new Rapid Express motorcoaches into service. These motorcoaches are the MCI D-Series, and replaced the Express 4500s. The agency also switched to Biogas, a renewable form of CNG as an interim measure until the electric transition is completed in 2040.

== Current services ==
Rapid routes are assigned route numbers in the 200-series and are mostly branded with individual route names. Currently, there are 10 routes on the Rapid network. Additionally, the Rapid Express service operates from selected bus stations to downtown San Diego, bypassing City Heights and Kearny Mesa.

=== Rapid 201/202/204 (SuperLoop) ===
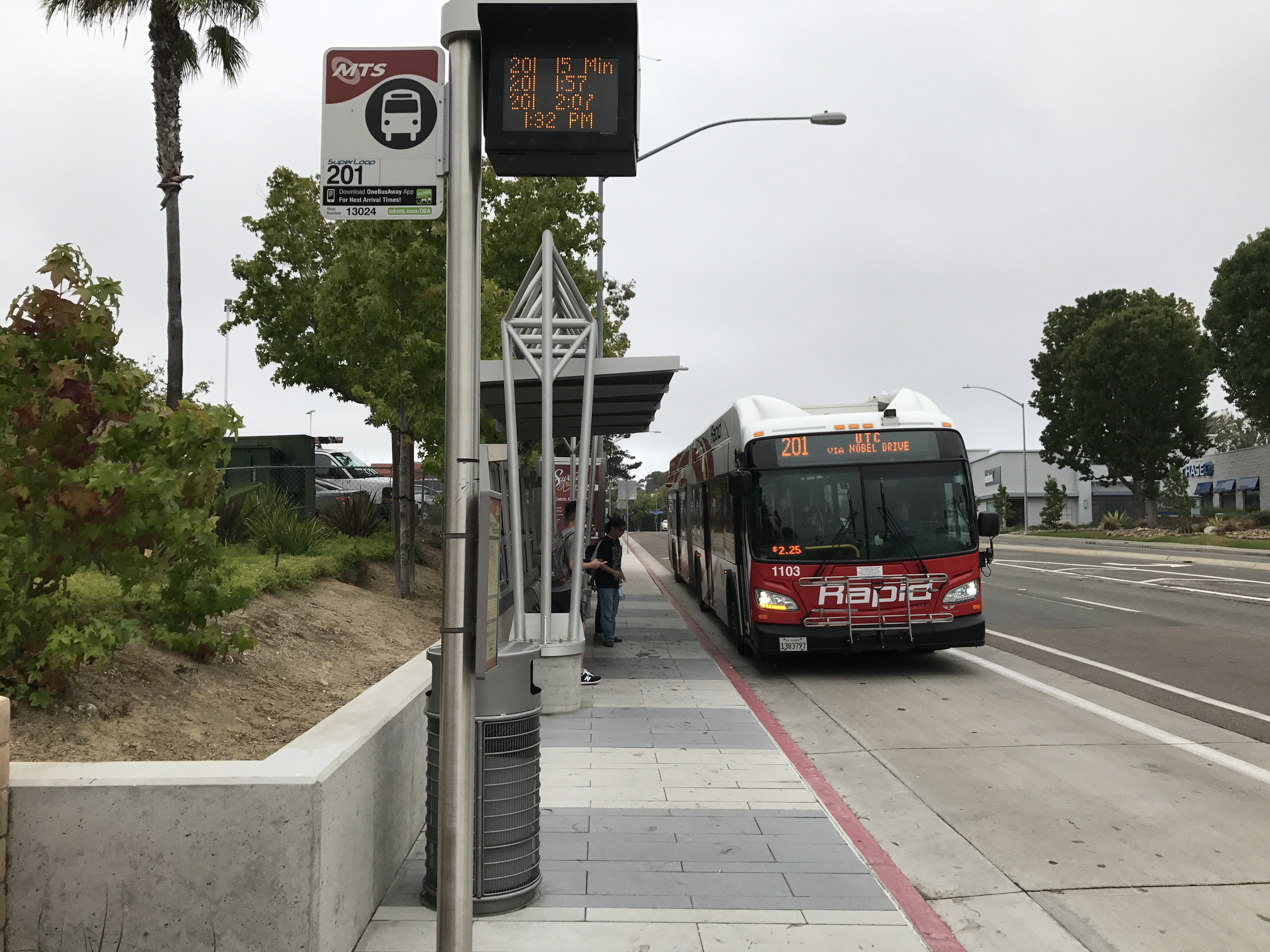
In 2015, the SuperLoop system was formally incorporated into the Rapid network and began using the XN60 buses for added capacity

On September 6, 2015, the MTS SuperLoop (Routes 201, 202 and 204) were incorporated into the network. MTS markets the routes as a sub-brand called SuperLoop Rapid. Rapid 201 (counter-clockwise) and 202 (clockwise) connect UC San Diego and Westfield UTC on a loop that passes through La Jolla Village, north University City, and the Jacobs Medical Center complex, while Rapid 204 serves the office parks and apartment complexes due east of UTC in a clockwise loop. In addition, it inherited the 12 Gas-Electric Hybrid buses that originally provided the service. These buses were re-vinyled into the Rapid livery, and also began serving Rapid 237 in addition to their native SuperLoop routes. In April 2018, these buses were retired from service and replaced by re-vinyled C40LF buses from the Mainline fleet.

=== Rapid 215 (Mid-City Rapid) ===
The Mid-City Rapid (Rapid 215) operates between San Diego State University (SDSU), City Heights, Normal Heights, North Park, Balboa Park, and Downtown San Diego. The 10-mile (16 km) route follows El Cajon and Park boulevards. Service began on October 12, 2014, following about a year of construction that included new shelters, street modifications, and improvements along the corridor. The route connects with other Rapid services, including Rapid 235 and 237, at the Boulevard Transit Plaza, and terminates at the SDSU Transit Center. While it was intended to reduce travel times on a heavily used transit corridor, the service has been limited by traffic congestion, particularly during peak periods, and by the absence of continuous dedicated bus lanes.

Rapid 215 operates with a mix of side-running stations along El Cajon, center-running stations on the north end of Park (Howard and University), and uses existing bus stops on the south end of Park (San Diego Zoo and Naval Medical Center). In Downtown San Diego, it reuses Rapid stations already in place. The line was originally proposed to have a dedicated bus lane from end-to-end, but became business access and transit lanes along El Cajon and were eliminated in some places due to opposition from community groups, mostly representing business owners.

=== Rapid 225 (South Bay Rapid) ===
The South Bay Rapid (Rapid 225) operates along a 21-mile (34-kilometer) route between the Otay Mesa Transit Center near the Otay Mesa Port of Entry and downtown San Diego. The route first began limited peak-hour service on September 4, 2018 between the East Palomar Transit Station in Chula Vista and downtown San Diego. The route initially operated in the Rapid Express pattern, headed northbound (into downtown) in the morning and southbound (returning from downtown) in afternoons with no reverse-commute opportunities or weekend service. This route expanded to full daily service on January 26, 2019, with five new stations opening; these are located at Heritage Park, Lomas Verdes, Santa Venetia, the Otay Ranch Town Center, and at the recently developed, mixed-use Millenia community. Within Chula Vista, it uses a dedicated busway which follows the median on East Palomar Street, before running alongside Olympic Parkway and Eastlake Parkway to serve Otay Ranch and Millenia. Throughout its planning, the route sparked controversy mainly by HOAs due to its bisection of the Otay Ranch and Eastlake communities and its proximity to nearby homes. The buses used on this route feature intercity coach-style seating, but have silver-colored destination displays on the outside compared to the rest of the fleet, which have amber ones. As with the opening of the original route, free bus rides were offered on the first week of operation on this route only.

=== Rapid 227 (Iris Rapid) ===
The Iris Rapid (Rapid 227) operates between Otay Mesa to Imperial Beach with some busses short turning at the Iris Avenue Transit Center along the way. The route is the first fully-electric route on the Rapid network. Planning began on September 13, 2019, though the MTS received grants to buy electric busses for a new South Bay route as early as late 2018. MTS aimed to have the route operational by January 2023 at the earliest, with service on Rapid 227 eventually starting on October 15, 2023 and minor route changes later taking effect in June 2024 following pushback from Imperial Beach residents. In June 2026, weekend service to Imperial Beach was eliminated.

=== Rapid 235 (I-15 Rapid) ===
The I-15 Rapid (Rapid 235) operates between Escondido Transit Center and downtown San Diego. It saves up to 45 minutes from local MTS Route 20, which continues to operate along the corridor to serve locations not served by the Rapid network. It also eliminates a transfer at Del Lago Transit Center between Route 20 and Breeze Rapid to central Escondido. Along the Interstate 15, Rapid 235 has two "Centerline" freeway-level transit stations at University Avenue and El Cajon Boulevard. Further north, the route uses the I-15 express lanes.

==== Initial cost ====
The cost for the initial operating segment is approximately $238 million, consisting primarily of transit centers at City Heights, Del Lago, Escondido, and Rancho Bernardo; parking structures at Miramar College and Sabre Springs; and new 60-foot buses. This is in addition to the investment in the I-15 HOT lane project, which cost approximately $1 billion for four new lanes and direct access ramps. Taxpayer advocates have supported the Rapid due to its lower cost compared to rail extensions at the time.

=== Rapid 237 (Mira Mesa Blvd. Rapid) ===
The Mira Mesa Blvd. Rapid (Rapid 237) operates peak-hour service between UCSD and the Miramar College Transit Station with stops along Mira Mesa Boulevard. The line initially operated past Miramar College to Rancho Bernardo via the I-15 HOT lanes. However the line was cut back due to low ridership along the I-15 section. This change was incorporated into the Transit Optimization Plan (TOP) in 2017.

=== Rapid 280/290 (Rapid Express) ===
Rapid Express service replaced the Premium Express service which formerly operated along the corridor, The new routes made limited stops between Downtown San Diego and the northern I-15 transit stations. Until March 2021, Biodiesel powered intercity coaches operate this service, when they were replaced with Biogas commuter coaches. Much like the network it replaced, Rapid Express operates peak-hours only, inbound in morning peak and outbound in afternoon peak, without reverse-commute services. Rapid Express services also terminate at the County Administration Building instead of the Santa Fe Depot.

== Future plans ==
=== South Bay Rapid infill stations ===
Early concept maps of the South Bay Rapid revealed the possibility of additional CenterLine stations in the medians of I-805 and SR 94. These will be located at Hilltop, National City/East, 47th Street trolley station, 28th Street and in East Village.

No concept art was initially drawn or published, but on January 26, 2019, this project was officially announced in a dedication ceremony and concept art was unveiled. Construction will begin once funding is secured.

=== Converting basic stops into stations ===
New shelters are due to be installed at the three Kearny Mesa stops, located at Ruffin Road, Overland Avenue, and at the Kearny Mesa interchange. The first shelter was installed on the inbound side of the Ruffin stop in 2017, next to the Kaiser Permanente San Diego Hospital. The remaining shelters are still in the final design stages.

=== Electrification ===
On November 30, 2017, MTS announced its procurement of all-electric buses. This makes MTS the fourth agency to place electric buses of any propulsion method into revenue service, only behind Muni, Antelope Valley Transit Authority, and Anaheim Resort Transit. Electrification is set for Summer 2019, when the Xcelsior CHARGE pilot units arrive. This Demonstrates MTS committed to be in compliance with Initiative Clean Transit, a proposed California law that could result in full electrification by 2040. These new buses will be placed into the system's Copley Park division and replace the C40LFs.

A grant for 11 more buses has been awarded to MTS.

=== Downtown layover facility ===
On June 22, 2018 SANDAG announced that it has seized control of a block of land currently occupied by an auto maintenance facility, a law firm and a car park. The agency plans to construct a downtown layover facility for buses. Its perimeter will be bordered by A Street, Union Street, State Street and B Street. It will not serve passengers, but act in a similar manner to a yard, but without maintenance bays.

== Fares ==
As of September 1, 2019, the fare structure for Rapid is as follows. Passes can be purchased at any fare vending machine within the network.

Fare Type		One Way	Day Pass	Monthly Pass
Adult	Rapid	$2.50	$6	$72
Adult	Rapid Express	$5.00	$12	$100
Youth	Rapid	$1.25	$3	$23
Youth	Rapid Express	$2.50	$6	$32
Senior (65+) / Disabled / Medicare	Rapid	$1.25	$3	$23
Senior (65+) / Disabled / Medicare	Rapid Express	$2.50	$6	$32

== Fleet ==
=== Current fleet ===
Make/Model	Image	Routes Served	Division	Propulsion	Year	Fleet numbers (Qty.)	Notes
New Flyer XN60		215	Imperial Avenue	CNG	2014	1201–1218 (18 buses)	These buses have regular mainline bus seats.
New Flyer XN60		201, 202, 215, 235, 237	Kearny Mesa	CNG	2015	1301–1313 (13 buses)	These buses are painted in the standard MTS livery, but are regularly assigned to Rapid routes.
New Flyer XN60		201, 202, 235, 237	Kearny Mesa	CNG	2023	1901–1929 (29 buses)	
New Flyer XN60		225	South Bay	CNG	2018	7501–7517 (17 buses)	
Gillig Low Floor		201, 202, 204, 237	Kearny Mesa	CNG	2017	1401-1410 (10 buses)	
MCI D4500CT		280, 290	East County	CNG	2020	8531–8554 (24 buses)	
New Flyer XE60		227	South Bay	Battery Electric	2023	7551–7562 (12 buses)	

=== Past fleet ===
Make/Model	Image	Propulsion	Model Year	Year Retired	Fleet numbers (Quantity)	Notes
New Flyer GE35LFR		Gasoline-Electric Hybrid	2009	2018	501–512 (12 buses)	The model had mechanical problems and maintenance difficulties due to the manufacturer of the hybrid drive system going out of business in 2010. All buses were retired from service and auctioned off in early 2018.
Blue Bird Express 4500		Biodiesel	2007	2021	8501–8526 (26 buses)	These were the last Biodiesel-powered vehicles in the MTS fleet.; These were also the only buses that were not updated with passenger information displays.
New Flyer Low Floor (C40LF)		CNG	2008	2023	339-350 (12 buses)	These buses were originally mainline buses that were wrapped in the MTS Rapid livery.; These buses replaced the 12 gasoline-electric hybrid buses in 2018.; They were in the process of being retired from service and auctioned off beginning in late 2022, with the final 3 buses being retired in early 2023.
New Flyer Xcelsior (XN60)		CNG	2013	2025	1101-1129 (29 buses)	These were the first buses to feature passenger information displays.; These were the first buses constructed specifically for MTS Rapid.; These were MTS's first ever Xcelsior buses.; 10 buses were sold to Santa Cruz METRO from late 2023 to late 2024.; They were in the process of being retired from service and auctioned off beginning in late 2023, with the final 3 buses being retired in early 2025.; These buses were replaced by the 1900-series New Flyer XN60 buses.

=== Maintenance and operations ===
Operation of Rapid is split, with Transdev operating 4 routes under contract to MTS (225, 227, 280 and 290), and directly by MTS for the remainder. This is because buses from different divisions are used on certain routes.

The fleet is maintained at the system's Imperial, Kearny Mesa, East County and South Bay divisions. The latter two are under maintenance contract to Transdev, which also includes routes assigned to these divisions.
