= Gulf and Caribbean Sea Naval Force =

- Fuerza Naval del Golfo y Mar Caribe
- Active: February 11, 1972 – present
- Country: Mexico
- Allegiance: Mexican Navy
- Role: Maritime Security, Search and Rescue, Coastal Defense
- Garrison/HQ: Tuxpan, Veracruz

Commanders
- Current commander: Admiral José de Jesús Marte Camarena Zepeda

The Gulf and Caribbean Sea Naval Force (Spanish: Fuerza Naval del Golfo y Mar Caribe) is the maritime division of the Mexican Navy, whose primary objective is to safeguard and protect the coastlines and territorial seas of Mexico bordering the Gulf of Mexico and Caribbean Sea. The force was created on the same date as its Pacific counterpart on February 11, 1972.

== Current composition ==
The Naval Force is divided into three Naval Regions (Región Naval), six Naval Zones (Zona Naval) and five Naval Sectors (Sector Naval):

- First Naval Region Northern Gulf (RN-1) – Tuxpan, Veracruz
  - First Naval Zone (ZN-1) – Ciudad Madero, Tamaulipas
    - Naval Sector Matamoros, Tamaulipas
    - Naval Sector La Pesca, Tamaulipas
  - Third Naval Zone (ZN-3) – Veracruz, Veracruz
    - Naval Sector Coatzacoalcos, Veracruz
- Third Naval Region Campeche (RN-3) – Ciudad del Carmen, Campeche
  - Fifth Naval Zone (ZN-5) – Frontera, Tabasco
  - Seventh Naval Zone (ZN-7) – Lerma, Campeche
    - Naval Sector Champoton, Campeche
- Fifth Naval Region Caribbean (RN-5) – Isla Mujeres, Quintana Roo
  - Ninth Naval Zone (ZN-9) Yucalpeten, Yucatán
  - Eleventh Naval Zone (ZN-11) – Chetumal, Quintana Roo
    - Naval Sector Conzumel, Quintana Roo

== See also ==
- Mexican Navy
  - Pacific Naval Force
  - Mexican Naval Aviation
