= Breeze Rapid =

- Parent: North County Transit District
- Founded: June 7, 2011
- Locale: Escondido, California
- Routes: 1
- Stops: 25 (1 stop at Escondido Transit Center, and 12 stops in each direction)
- Hubs: Escondido Transit Center; Del Lago Transit Station
- Fleet: 6 New Flyer C40LF buses
- Daily ridership: 2500 average weekday riders
- Fuel type: CNG
- Operator: North County Transit District

Breeze Rapid (stylized as BREEZE Rapid) was a brand of bus service with some bus rapid transit characteristics operated by the North County Transit District (NCTD) in North County, San Diego. Its first and only route (350) was introduced in 2011. The brand has been quietly retired, but the route is still in operation.

Breeze Rapid Route 350 operates in Escondido, California, between Escondido Transit Center and Del Lago Transit Center, primarily along Escondido Boulevard and Bear Valley Parkway. Breeze Rapid enhanced the previous Breeze Route 350 service with dedicated buses, branded stops, and faster, more frequent service.

== History ==
The project was initiated by the San Diego Association of Governments (SANDAG) in June 2005, in cooperation with the City of Escondido and NCTD. The purpose of the project was to identify improvements to a rapid bus connection between the Sprinter at Escondido Transit Center, downtown and south Escondido, the Westfield North County mall, and the forthcoming MTS Rapid 235. The previous service was prone to bus bunching, heavy boardings near schools on the south end of the route, and traffic congestion in key locations during the morning and evening commute periods.

== Service Enhancements ==
Breeze Rapid Route 350 includes bus stop improvements, queue jump lanes at congested intersections, and transit signal priority. Bus stops were consolidated from 31 stops to 25 stops, and received new benches, shelters and posted route information. Eight bus stops include digital message signs that indicate the next bus arrival, which is provided by using NextBus technology. Improvements for pedestrian safety, as well as street system modifications to improve local traffic flow, were also made. The six New Flyer C40LF busses that are used on this route (2301-2306) were painted with a special Breeze Rapid livery to distinguish them from the other New Flyer C40LF buses. All have since been retired.

However, Breeze Rapid Route 350 does not include dedicated right-of-way, off-board fare collection or platform-level boarding. It does not adhere to the BRT Standard and may be a symptom of BRT Creep.

The cost for the route upgrade was $4,300,000 and the route was projected to have 2,500 riders at opening. Riders save up to 20%, or six minutes, as a result of the improvements.

== Future ==
The Breeze Rapid brand is no longer present on NCTD's web site or Rider's Guide. All six Breeze Rapid buses are retired as of October 28, 2021.

Future rapid bus services operated by NCTD may also use the Breeze Rapid name. The 2019 SANDAG Regional Transportation Plan proposes a number of rapid bus projects within NCTD's service area:

Existing Breeze Route	Proposed Rapid Route	Description	Headway (min.)	Capital cost (mil. USD 2019)
--	103	Solana Beach to Sabre Springs Rapid station via Carmel Valley	15	$91
445	440	Carlsbad to Escondido Transit Center via Palomar Airport Rd	10	$140
355/357/388	471	Downtown Escondido to East Escondido via Valley Pkwy	10	$46
303	474	Oceanside to Vista via Mission Ave/Santa Fe Rd Corridor	10	$99
315	477	Camp Pendleton to Carlsbad Village via College Blvd, Plaza Camino Real	10	$109

Breeze Route 101 (Oceanside to Westfield UTC via Highway 101) was also under consideration for rapid conversion as of 2011, but is currently not present in the plan.

== See also ==
- Rapid (San Diego)
