= Pacific Naval Force =

Mexican Navy's presence in the Pacific Ocean

- Fuerza Naval del Pacífico
- Active: February 11, 1972 – present
- Country: Mexico
- Branch: Mexican Navy
- Role: Maritime Security, Search and Rescue, Coastal Defense
- Size: 20,000
- Garrison/HQ: Manzanillo, Colima

Commanders
- Current commander: Admiral Carlos Ortega Muñiz

The Pacific Naval Force (Spanish: Fuerza Naval del Pacífico) is the Mexican Navy's presence in the Pacific Ocean. Its headquarters is in Manzanillo, Colima. The Pacific Naval Force was created in the same date as its Gulf of Mexico and Caribbean Sea counterpart on February 11, 1972. The Surface ships are the main components of The Naval Force and is the means to secure and to operate sea control in strategic areas. Main objectives of the Naval force is to Defend the sovereignty and integrity of Mexico from sea, protect vital naval installations, protect human life and maintain marine traffic and maintain the rule of law in national waters.

== Organization ==
The Naval Force is divided into 4 Naval Regions (Región Naval), 10 Naval Zones (Zona Naval), and 6 Naval Sectors (Sector Naval):

- Second Naval Region Northern Pacific (RN-2) – Ensenada, Baja California
  - Naval sector – Puerto Cortés, Baja California Sur
- Fourth Naval Region Gulf of California (RN-4) – Guaymas, Sonora
  - Second Naval Zone (ZN-2) – La Paz, Baja California Sur
    - Naval Sector – Santa Rosalía, Baja California Sur
    - Naval Sector – Cabo San Lucas, Baja California Sur
  - Fourth Naval Zone (ZN-4) – Mazatlán, Sinaloa
    - Naval Sector – Puerto Peñasco, Sonora
    - Naval Sector – San Felipe, Baja California
  - Naval Sector – Topolobampo, Sinaloa
- Sixth Naval Region Center Pacific (RN-6) – Manzanillo, Colima
  - Sixth Naval Zone (ZN-6) – San Blas, Nayarit
    - Naval Sector – Isla Socorro
  - Eight Naval Zone (ZN-8) – Puerto Vallarta, Jalisco
  - Tenth Naval Zone (ZN-10) – Lázaro Cárdenas, Michoacán
- Eight Naval Region South Pacific (RN-8) – Acapulco, Guerrero
  - Naval Sector Ixtapa – Zihuatanejo, Guerrero
  - Twelfth Naval Zone (ZN-12) – Salina Cruz, Oaxaca
    - Naval Sector – Huatulco, Oaxaca
  - Fourteenth Naval Zone (ZN-14) – Puerto Chiapas, Chiapas

== Naval ship units ==
=== Destroyer Flotilla ===
- Manuel Azueta class
  - ARM Manuel Azueta (D-111) (1973 – 2015)
- Quetzalcóatl class
  - ARM Netzahualcoyotl (D-102) (1982 – 2014)
- Bravo class
  - ARM Bravo (F-201) (1993 – 2017)
  - ARM Galeana (F-202) (1993 – 2017)

=== Auxiliary Ship Flotilla ===
- Panuco class
  - ARM Manzanillo (A-402) (1971 – 2011)
- Papaloapan class
  - ARM Papaloapan (A-411) (2001 – present)
  - ARM Usumacinta (A-412) (2001 – present)

=== Ship Embarked Helicopter Squadron ===
- AS555 AF Fennec

== Amphibious Reaction Force ==
=== Naval Infantry Units ===
- Command and General Staff
- 2nd Marine Amphibious Infantry Battalion
  - 1st Amphibious Assault Vehicle Company
- 4th Marine Amphibious Infantry Battalion
- 2nd Amphibious Assault Vehicle Company
- 2nd Amphibious Commando Battalion
- 3rd Amphibious Assault Vehicle Company
- Amphibious Vehicle Reconnaissance Company
- 2nd Support Battalion

=== Naval Air Squadron ===
- Antonov An-32

== Special Forces Group ==
- Special Forces Unit
  - Command and Command Group
  - Support Group
- Transport Unit
  - Mil Mi-8
- Patrol Interceptor Group

== See also ==
- Mexican Navy
  - Gulf and Caribbean Sea Naval Force
  - Mexican Naval Aviation
