= Beyer Boulevard station =

San Diego Trolley station

Beyer Boulevard
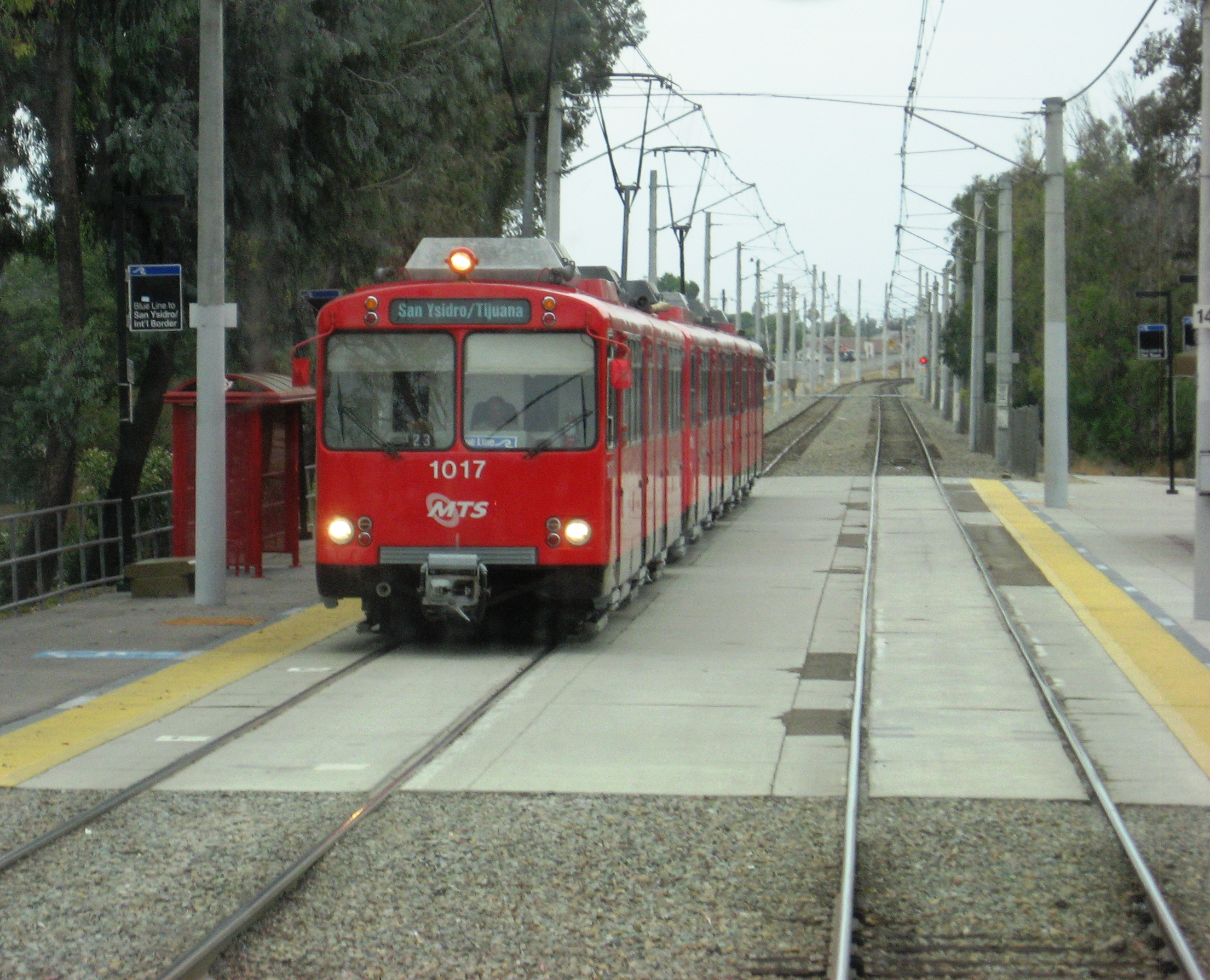
- A southbound trolley at Beyer Boulevard station in January 2010

General information
- Location: 4035 Beyer Boulevard; San Diego, California; United States
- Coordinates: 32°33′30″N 117°02′50″W
- Owner: San Diego Metropolitan Transit System
- Operator: San Diego Trolley
- Line: SD&AE Main Line
- Platforms: 2 side platforms
- Tracks: 2
- Connections: MTS: 906, 907

Construction
- Structure type: At-grade
- Parking: 131 spaces
- Cycle facilities: 8 rack spaces, 2 lockers
- Accessible: Disabled access

Other information
- Station code: 75002, 75003

History
- Opened: July 26, 1981
- Rebuilt: 2015

Services
Preceding station	San Diego Trolley	Following station
Iris Avenue toward UTC	Blue Line	San Ysidro Terminus
Location

Beyer Boulevard station is a station on the Blue Line of the San Diego Trolley located on Beyer Boulevard, west of its intersection with Alaquinas Drive/West Park Avenue, in San Ysidro neighborhood of San Diego. The stop serves as a park and ride commuter center in addition to providing access to the surrounding residential areas.

== History ==
Beyer Boulevard opened as part of the initial 15.9-mile (25.6 km) "South Line" of the San Diego Trolley system on July 26, 1981, operating from San Ysidro north to downtown San Diego using the main line tracks of the San Diego and Arizona Eastern Railway.

This station was originally scheduled to undergo renovation starting December 2014, as part of the Trolley Renewal Project, though actual renovation construction didn't begin until January 2015; it reopened with a renovated station platform in June 2015.

== See also ==
- List of San Diego Trolley stations
