= Tijuana station =

Former passenger rail station and current freight rail station in Tijuana, Mexico

Tijuana station Estación de Tijuana

General information
- Location: Av Ferrocarril 1, Libertad, 22400; Tijuana, Baja California; Mexico
- Coordinates: 32.542105°N 117.026245°W
- System: Current freight rail station, former passenger station
- Operator: Baja California Railroad
- Platforms: 1
- Tracks: 6

Construction
- Parking: For 68 automobiles

Other information
- Status: Open for freight use
- Website: https://www.bajarr.com/en/stations/

History
- Opened: December 1919
- Closed: ~1951 (passenger use)

Former services
Preceding station	Southern Pacific Railroad	Following station
San Ysidro toward San Diego	San Diego and Arizona Eastern Railway Main Line	Agua Caliente toward El Centro
Location

Tijuana station (Spanish: Estación de Tijuana) is a former passenger rail station and current freight rail station located in Tijuana, Baja California.

== History ==
The station is located on the Tijuana-Tecate railroad line, which was built by concession on April 3, 1908. In 1907, the Inter-California Railway, a subsidiary of the Southern Pacific Railroad, began construction. Its goal was to connect the port of San Diego, California, with Yuma, the entry point to the mining region of Arizona, through a route through Mexican soil that began in Tijuana and ended in Algodones. near the north-eastern tip of the Baja California Peninsula. The Tijuana station, built a few steps from the international dividing line, was completed in December 1919 by the San Diego and Arizona Railway.

== Services ==
The station is currently housed in a three-story building of 1,000 square meters, which contains new administrative offices, an operations and logistics control center, offices for ADMICARGA, customs control, a customs agency, the Ministry of Agriculture and Rural Development, and the State Committee for Plant Health.

There is also parking space for sixty-eight 18-meter automobiles. The original train station, built in the late 1920s, will be converted into a railway museum.

The new station is where administrative and operations offices are located, in addition to being where the customs procedures necessary for a safe border crossing are carried out.
