= Pacific Fleet station =

San Diego Trolley station

Pacific Fleet
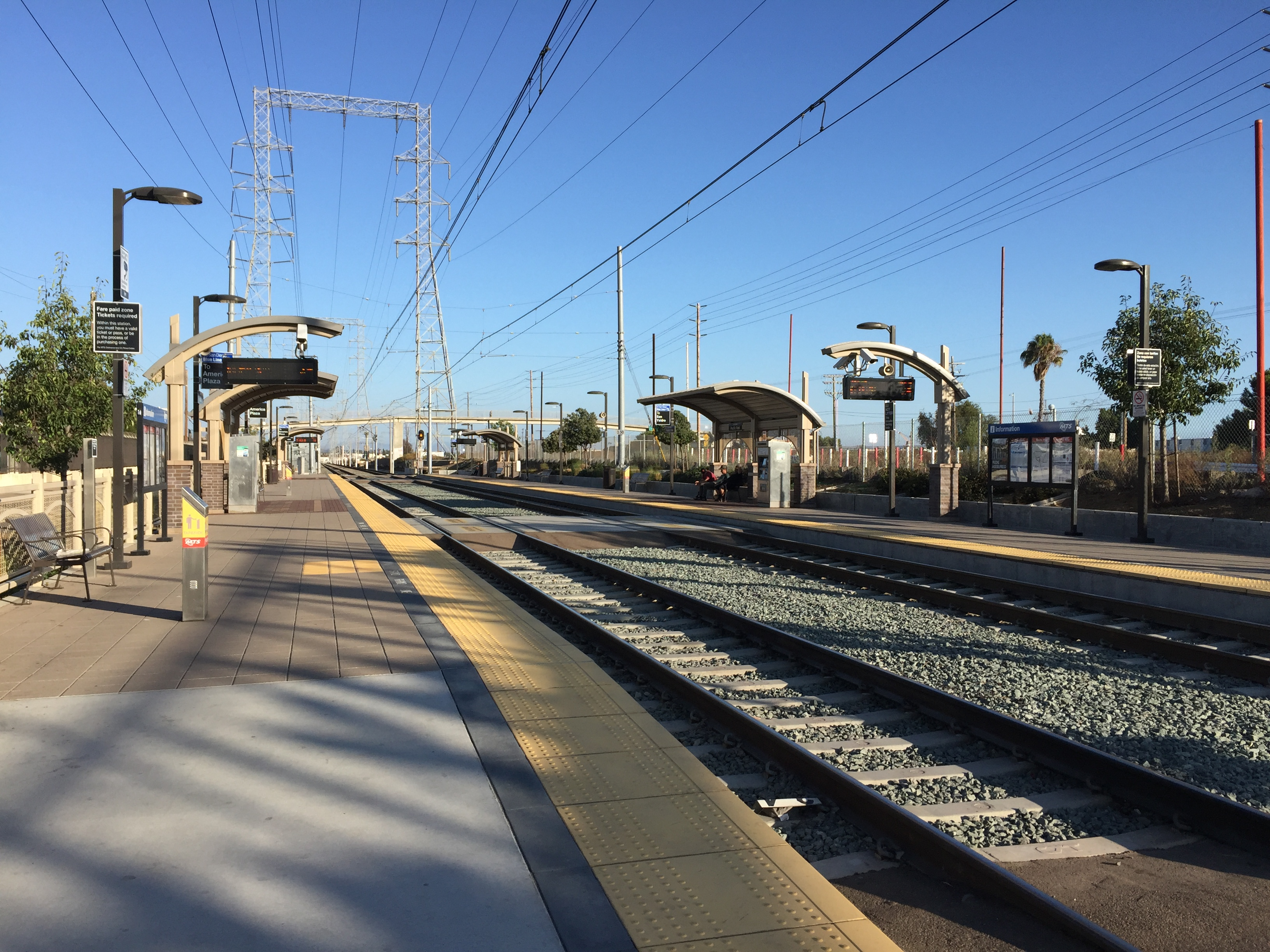
- Pacific Fleet station platforms in 2019

General information
- Location: 1800 South 32nd Street; San Diego, California; United States
- Coordinates: 32°41′10″N 117°07′30″W
- Owner: San Diego Metropolitan Transit System
- Operator: San Diego Trolley
- Line: SD&AE Main Line
- Platforms: 2 side platforms
- Tracks: 2

Construction
- Structure type: At-grade
- Cycle facilities: 4 rack spaces, 1 locker
- Accessible: Disabled access

Other information
- Station code: 75106, 75107

History
- Opened: July 26, 1981
- Rebuilt: 2014

Services
Preceding station	San Diego Trolley	Following station
Harborside toward UTC	Blue Line	8th Street toward San Ysidro
Location

Pacific Fleet station is a station on the Blue Line of the San Diego Trolley located near the intersection of 32nd Street and Harbor Drive in San Diego, California. It provides civilian access to Naval Base San Diego, the principal homeport of the United States Pacific Fleet.

== History ==
Pacific Fleet opened as part of the initial 15.9-mile (25.6 km) "South Line" of the San Diego Trolley system on July 26, 1981, operating from San Ysidro north to downtown San Diego using the main line tracks of the San Diego and Arizona Eastern Railway.

This station was renovated, starting October 2, 2013 as part of the Trolley Renewal Project; it reopened with a renovated station platform in mid August 2014.

== See also ==
- List of San Diego Trolley stations
