= Iris Avenue Transit Center =

San Diego Trolley station

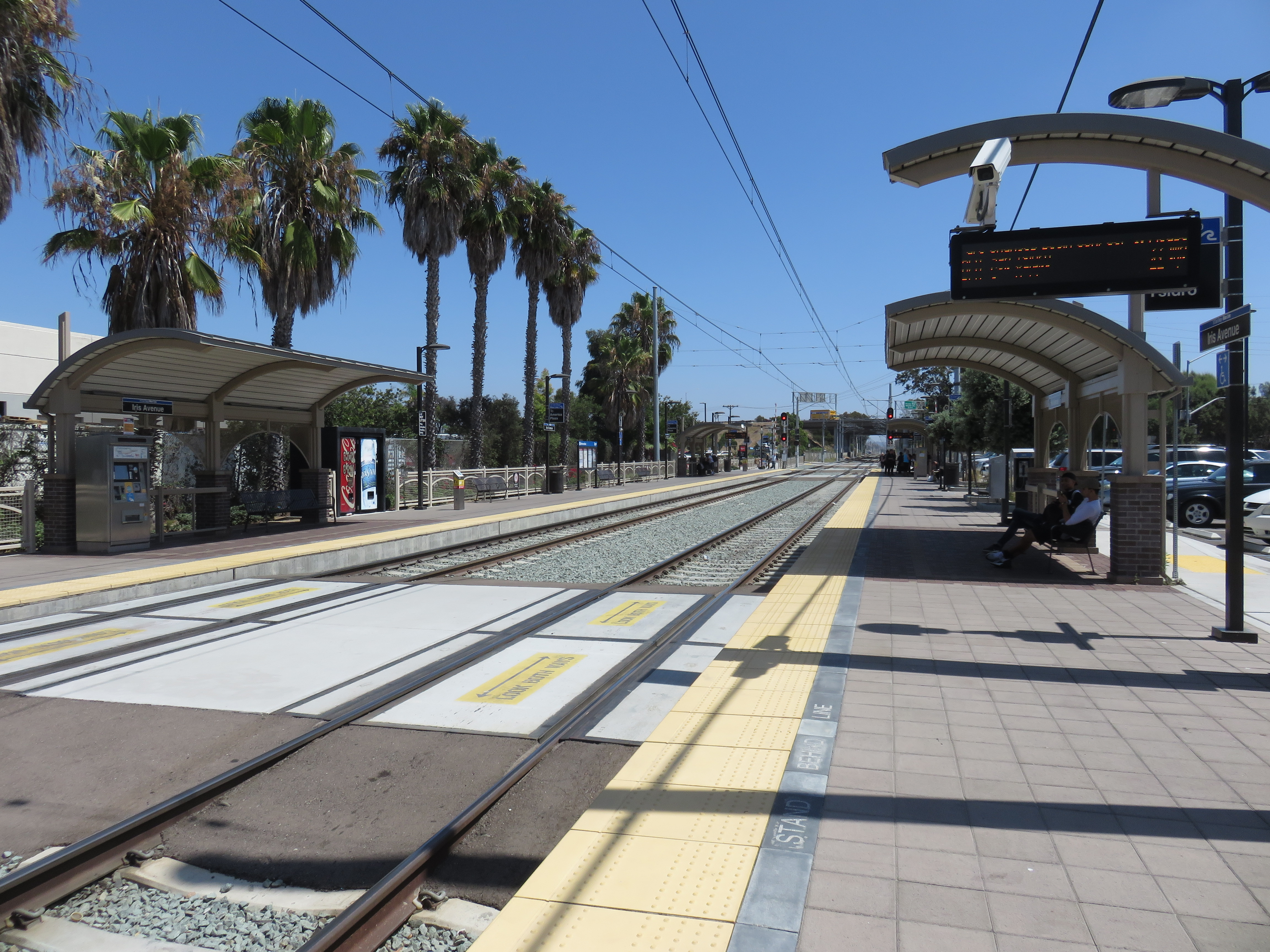
- Iris Avenue Transit Center platforms in August 2019

General information
- Location: 3120 Iris Avenue; San Diego, California; United States
- Coordinates: 32°34′09″N 117°03′58″W
- Owner: San Diego Metropolitan Transit System
- Operator: San Diego Trolley
- Line: SD&AE Main Line
- Platforms: 2 side platforms
- Tracks: 2
- Connections: MTS: 901, 905, 906, 907, 910 (Overnight Express), 929, 932, 933, 934

Construction
- Structure type: At-grade
- Parking: 192 spaces
- Cycle facilities: 12 rack spaces, 3 lockers
- Accessible: Disabled access

Other information
- Station code: 75004, 75005

History
- Opened: July 26, 1981
- Rebuilt: 2015

Services
Preceding station	San Diego Trolley	Following station
Palm Avenue toward UTC	Blue Line	Beyer Boulevard toward San Ysidro
Preceding station	Rapid	Following station
Hollister Street toward Imperial Beach	Rapid 227	Caliente Avenue toward Otay Mesa
Location

Iris Avenue Transit Center is a station on the Blue Line of the San Diego Trolley located on Iris Avenue between Howard Avenue and 30th Street in the Otay Mesa West neighborhood of San Diego, California, United States. The stop serves a variety of purposes, mainly acting as a bus hub connecting to Rapid 227 and other MTS bus routes as well as a park and ride featuring 192 spaces and 3 bike lockers.

== History ==
Iris Avenue opened as part of the initial 15.9-mile (25.6 km) "South Line" of the San Diego Trolley system on July 26, 1981, operating from San Ysidro north to downtown San Diego using the main line tracks of the San Diego and Arizona Eastern Railway.

This station was originally scheduled to undergo renovation starting September 2014, and in 2023, MTS reconstructed the west side of the parking lot following the finishing of Rapid 227. It was completed and put to service on October 15, 2023, for routes 933/934 and 906/907. MTS would finish the renewal project on Iris avenue in 2015. As part of the Trolley Renewal Project, it reopened with a renovated station platform in May 2015.

== See also ==
- List of San Diego Trolley stations
