= SuperLoop =

Former bus route in California, United States

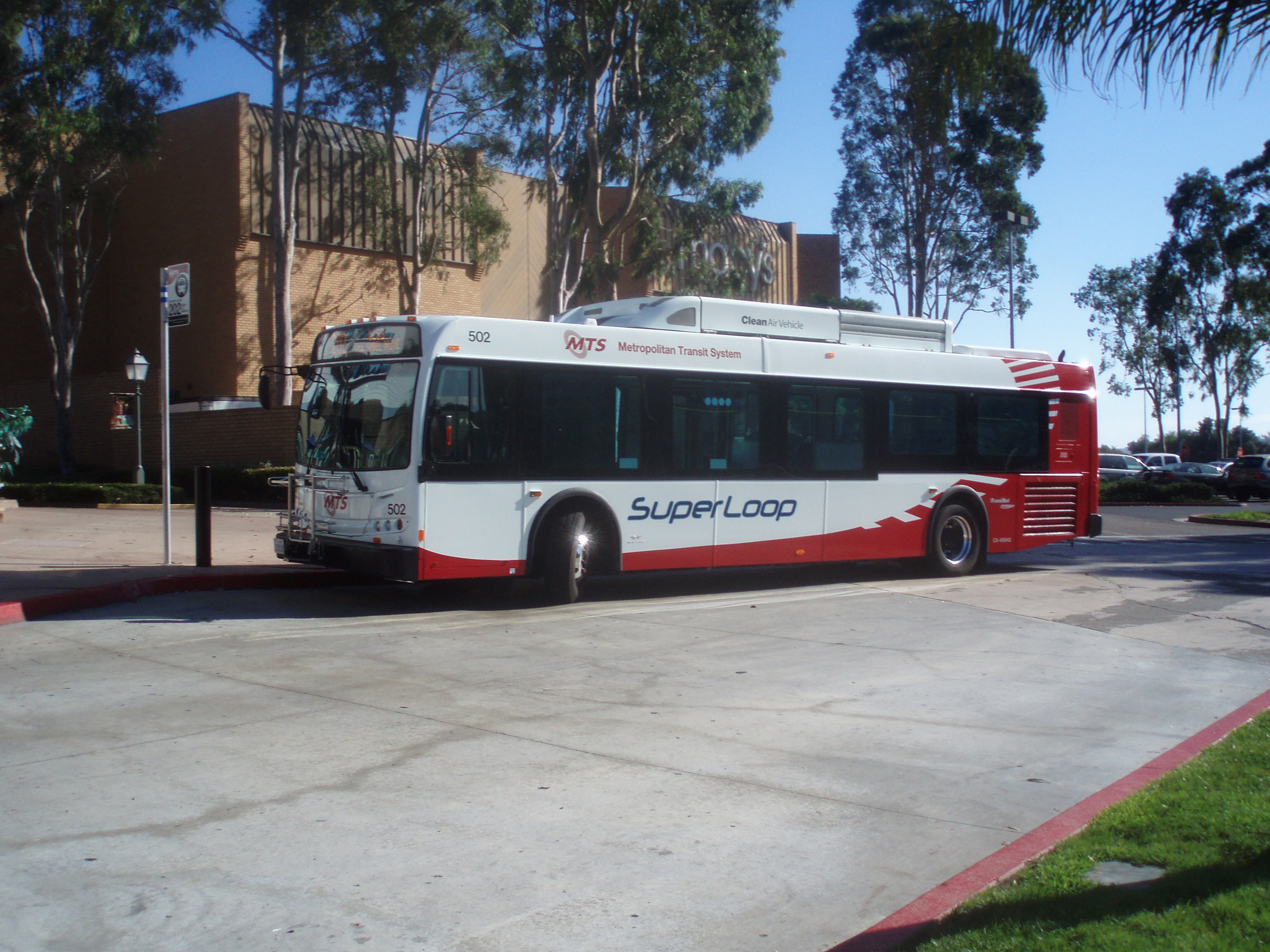
- Parent: Metropolitan Transit System
- Founded: 2007
- Commenced operation: June 15, 2009; 16 years ago
- Ceased operation: September 6, 2015; 10 years ago
- Locale: San Diego County, California
- Service area: University City
- Service type: Bus rapid transit
- Routes: 3 (201, 202, 204)
- Hubs: UTC Transit center
- Stations: 17
- Fleet: 12 New Flyer Industries GE35LFR buses
- Fuel type: Gas-Electric Hybrid
- Operator: San Diego Transit
- Website: SDMTS.com

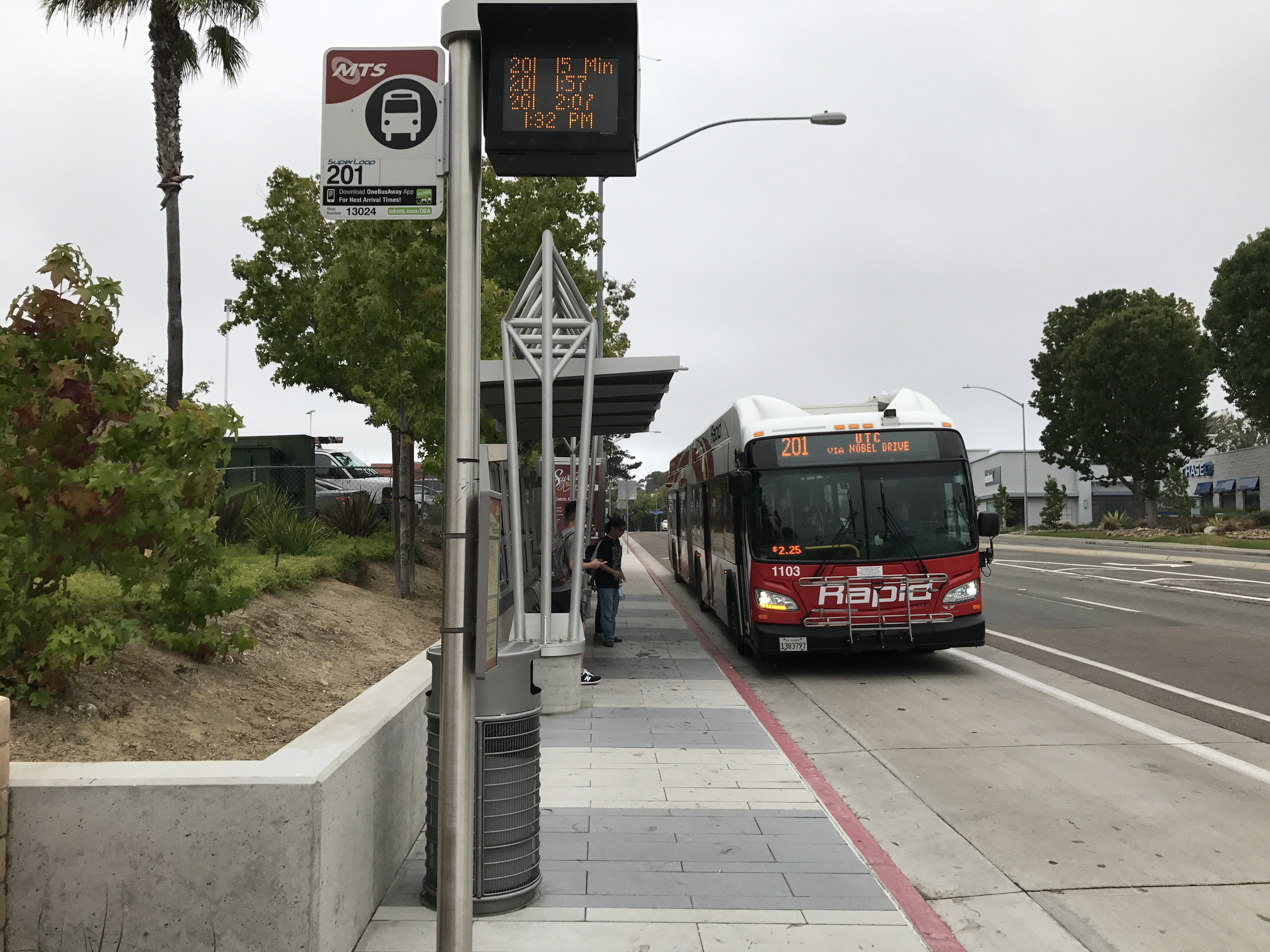
An MTS SuperLoop station and weekday bus in La Jolla

The SuperLoop was a bus rapid transit system in San Diego, California, United States, in the University City area. It connected the University of California, San Diego, and Westfield UTC. The 8-mile loop featured 15 stops served by as many as 12 dedicated New Flyer hybrid buses. Service of the SuperLoop was provided by the San Diego Metropolitan Transit System (MTS).

The system featured a number of amenities associated with bus rapid transit, such as signal prioritization, electronic signs in shelters indicating time until the arrival of the next bus, and recognizable branding. However, it featured only a small quantity of dedicated lanes.

== History ==
Traffic pattern studies showed that 60% of vehicles traveling in University City made internal trips. The SuperLoop expected to reduce the number of vehicles on the road by absorbing the traffic created by internal travelers.

The first phase of station construction began in late 2007. The SuperLoop began operations in an interim phase in mid-2009. At the launch of the SuperLoop service, vehicles ran approximately every 10 minutes during the peak periods, and every 15 minutes during non-peak periods. Adjustments were made after periodic review to better serve demand. In June 2012, the SuperLoop was extended to serve the area east of UTC.

In 2015, SuperLoop was added to the San Diego Rapid bus transit network. The fleet of 60-foot New Flyer Xcelsior buses were also introduced to the routes. Today, the routes are part of the Rapid network, with UTC Transit Center becoming a hub for the combined network. This ended the physical usage of the SuperLoop brand name after six years.

== Fares ==
SuperLoop followed the same fare policy as all other non-express MTS bus routes.

Amount	Type
$6.00	Adult Day Pass _{(For Trips Involving multiple routes or multiple rides) (Additional $2 if a valid Compass Card is not present)}
$3.00	Youth/Senior/Disabled/Medicare Day Pass _{(Valid Youth/Senior/Disabled/Medicare Compass Card must be present)}
$2.50	One Way Regular Fare _{(Ages 6+)}
$1.25	One Way Youth/Senior/Disabled/Medicare Fare _{(For Passengers Ages 60+, Or Those Passengers Providing An OfficeMax MTS Fare Discount ID)}
FREE	Children _{(Ages 5 and under, or 12 and under With a paid adult on the weekends)}

== Scheduling ==
=== Monday Through Friday ===
Time Window	Frequency
5:45 a.m. to 7 a.m.	Every 15 minutes
7 a.m. to 10:30 a.m.	Every 10 minutes
10:30 a.m. to 2 p.m.	Every 15 minutes
2 p.m. to 5:30 p.m.	Every 10 minutes
5:30 p.m. to 10 p.m.	Every 15 minutes

=== Weekends And Holidays ===
Time Window	Frequency
5:45 a.m. to 10 p.m.	Every 15 minutes

== See also ==
- Metropolitan Transit System
- San Diego MTS bus system
- MTS Rapid: On September 6, 2015, SuperLoop routes became Rapid services.

== Related Links ==
- SANDAG: SuperLoop
- SuperLoop Homepage
