= ARM Netzahualcóyotl =

Mexican naval ship

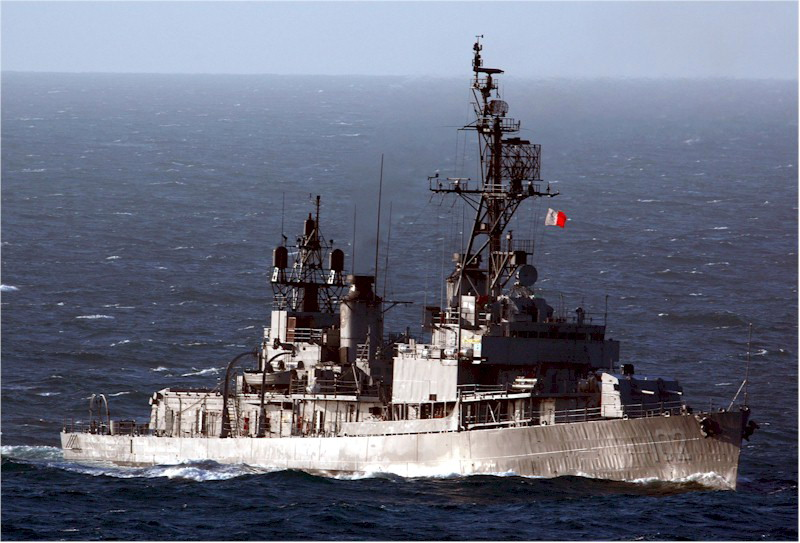
- ARM Netzahualcóyotl

History

Mexico
- Name: Netzahualcóyotl
- Acquired: 1982
- Decommissioned: 2014
- Status: To be sunk as a reef

General characteristics
- Class & type: Quetzalcóatl-class destroyer
- Armament: Matchbox ASROC, deck guns

ARM Netzahualcóyotl (D-102), a Quetzalcóatl-class destroyer, was a destroyers operated by the Mexican Navy. Netzahualcóyotl was originally USS Steinaker, a Gearing-class destroyer.

Mexico purchased Steinaker from the United States Navy in 1982, and renamed it after the Acolhua polymath Nezahualcoyotl. The destroyer was modified by the Mexican Navy and included a helicopter landing pad and an ASROC anti-submarine missile system. Netzahualcóyotl was used in drug interdiction and training missions for cadets from the Mexican Naval Academy, sailing annually up to San Francisco, California, in the United States.

Netzahualcóyotl was retired in 2014 and is slated to be sunk as an artificial reef.
