= USS Steinaker =

Gearing-class destroyer

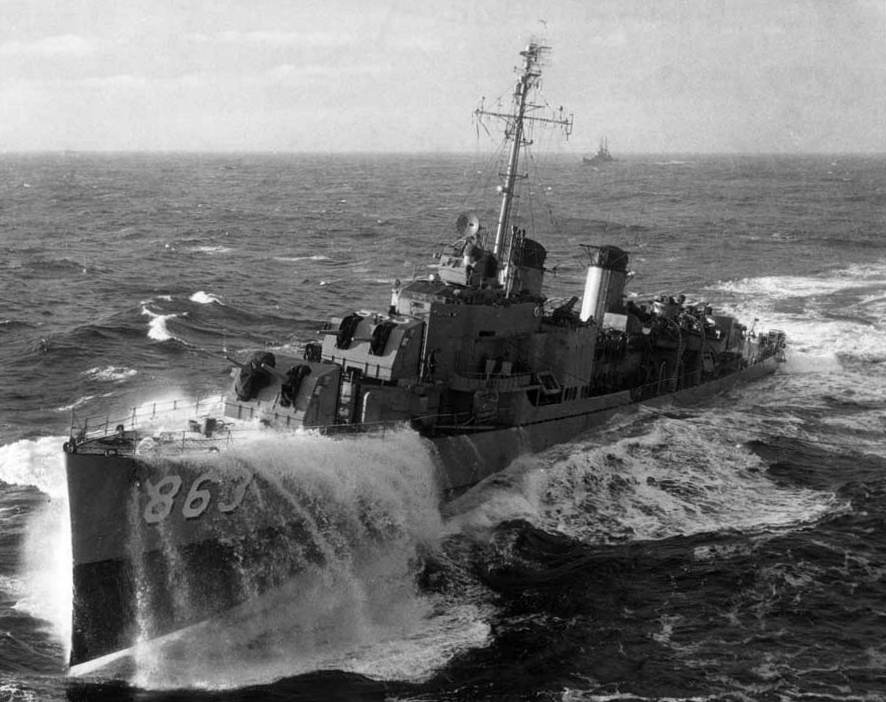
- USS Steinaker in the North Atlantic, in 1951.

History

United States
- Name: USS Steinaker
- Namesake: Private First Class Donald B. Steinaker (1922-1942), a United States Marine Corps Navy Cross recipient
- Builder: Bethlehem Steel Corporation, Staten Island, New York
- Laid down: 1 September 1944
- Launched: 13 February 1945
- Sponsored by: Miss Carol Steinaker
- Commissioned: 26 May 1945
- Decommissioned: 24 February 1982
- Stricken: 24 February 1982
- Identification: Callsign: NBFR; Hull number: DD-863
- Nickname(s): "Stinky"
- Fate: Sold to Mexican Navy, 24 February 1982; renamed ARM Netzahualcóyotl (D-102); Retired in 2014 and slated to be sunk as an artificial reef

General characteristics
- Class & type: Gearing-class destroyer
- Displacement: 3,460 tons (full)
- Length: 390 ft 6 in (119 m)
- Beam: 40 ft 10 in (12 m)
- Draft: 14 ft 4 in (4 m)
- Propulsion: 2-screw General Electric geared turbines, 60,000 shp
- Speed: 36.8 knots
- Range: 4500 nm @ 20 knots
- Complement: 336
- Armament: 6 × 5-inch 38 caliber guns; 12 × 40 mm guns; 11 × 20 mm guns; 10 × 21" tt

The second USS Steinaker (DD-863/DDR-863/DD-863) was a Gearing-class destroyer of the United States Navy.

== Namesake ==
Donald Baur Steinaker was born on 15 September 1922 at Syracuse, New York. He enlisted in the United States Marine Corps Reserve on 20 March 1941. He served at Marine Corps Recruit Depot Parris Island, South Carolina, and at Marine Corps Base Quantico, Virginia, before he was sent to the South Pacific for service during World War II.

During the Guadalcanal campaign, Private First Class Steinaker was killed in action at the Matanikau River on Guadalcanal on 9 October 1942 when his unit was attacked during a heavy Japanese offensive. He refused to be dislodged from his position and died at his post. He was posthumously awarded the Navy Cross.

The destroyer escort USS Steinaker (DE-452) was named for him, but its construction was cancelled in 1944.

== Construction and commissioning ==
Steinaker was laid down by the Bethlehem Steel Corporation at Staten Island in New York on 1 September 1944, launched on 13 February 1945 by Miss Carol Steinaker and commissioned on 26 May 1945.

== History ==
Steinaker held her shakedown cruise off Guantanamo Bay, Cuba, and returned to Norfolk, Virginia, her home port, where she acted as a training ship for the remainder of the year. Until 1952, the destroyer alternated her operations between the east coast with the Atlantic Fleet and deployment with the 6th Fleet. She was deployed to the Mediterranean in 1947, 1949, 1950, 1951, and the first five months of 1952.

Steinaker entered the Norfolk Naval Shipyard on 1 July 1952 for conversion to a radar picket destroyer and was classified as DDR-863. The work was completed on 28 February 1953 and shakedown at Guantanamo Bay followed. She made her first deployment to the 6th Fleet as a picket destroyer from 16 September to 3 February 1954. She also served with the 6th Fleet for portions of 1955, 1958, 1959, 1960, 1962, 1963, and 1965. In 1964, the destroyer was converted under the FRAM program and given modern antisubmarine weapons and detection equipment. On 1 July of that year, she resumed the designation, DD-863.

Steinaker was in the Red Sea and Indian Ocean for two months in 1967 as a unit of the Middle East Force. On 26 March 1968, she stood out of Norfolk headed for her first tour in the western Pacific. She transited the Panama Canal on 31 March and—after calling briefly at San Diego, Pearl Harbor, Midway, Guam, and the Philippine Islands—arrived off Vietnam.

Steinaker was assigned to the 7th Fleet from 20 May through 1 October and participated in naval gunfire support operations off Bình Thuận and Phú Yên provinces, in "Sea Dragon" operations off the coast of North Vietnam to interdict seaborne infiltration of Communist forces into South Vietnam, and on antiaircraft picket duty off the DMZ. She also operated with aircraft carriers conducting strikes against North Vietnam.

Steinaker returned to the east coast of the United States, via Subic Bay, Singapore, Yokosuka, and Okinawa. She arrived at Norfolk on 5 November 1968 and resumed Atlantic Fleet operations until 9 January 1970. At that time, she was assigned to NATO's Standing Naval Force, Atlantic. This tour lasted until 23 July 1970. She made another voyage to the Mediterranean from 23 February to 23 July 1971 and returned to the North Atlantic from 10 July to 18 November 1972.

Steinaker was transferred to Destroyer Squadron 10, Naval Reserve Force, on 1 July 1973 and changed her home port to Baltimore. Into December 1974, she serves as a training ship for reserves.

Steinaker received two battle stars for service in Vietnam.

Steinaker was decommissioned and stricken from the Naval Vessel Register on 24 February 1982, transferred to Mexico and renamed Netzahualcoyotl.
