= Balboa Avenue Transit Center =

San Diego Trolley station

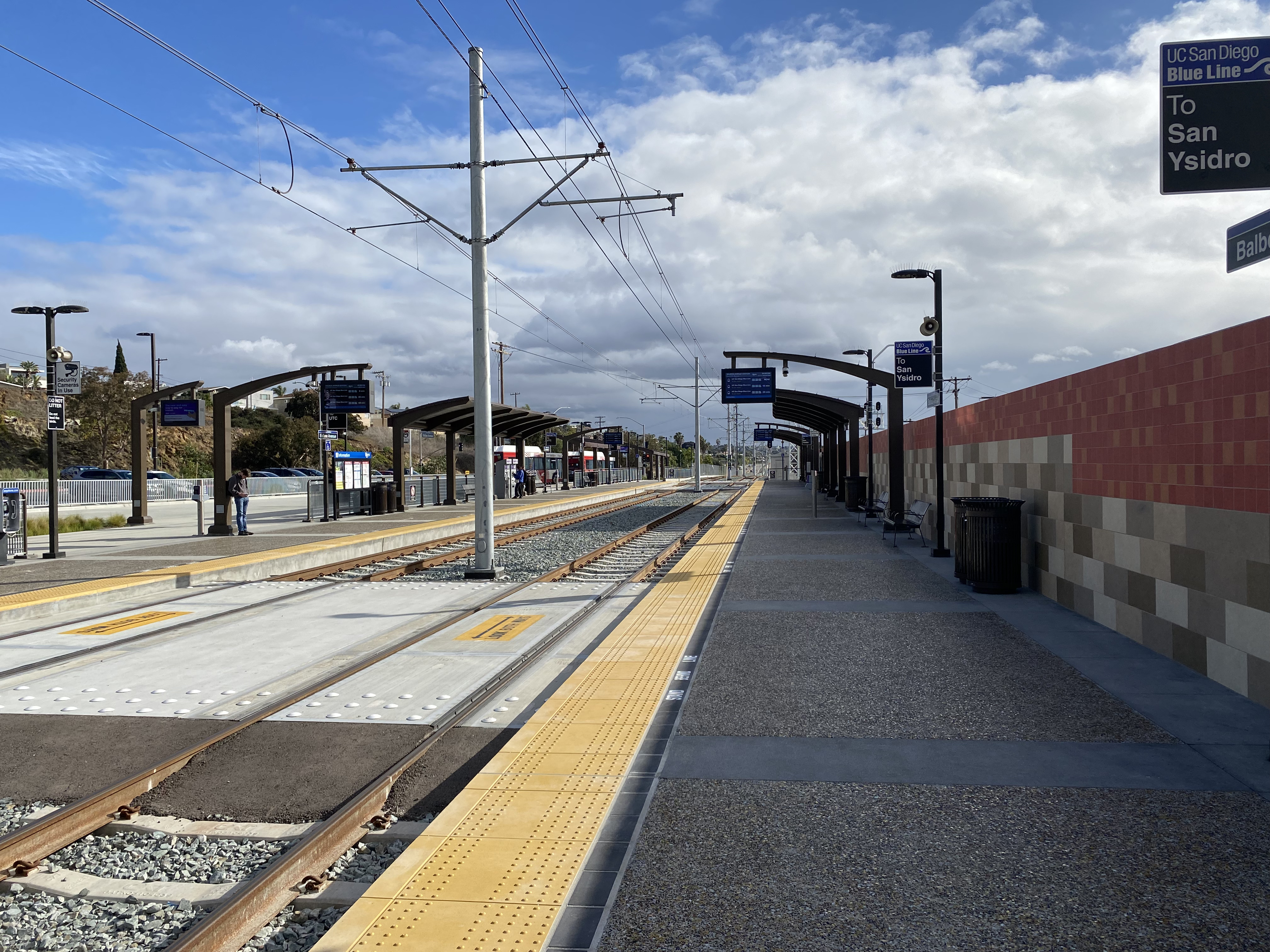
- Balboa Avenue Transit Center platform

General information
- Location: 3690 Morena Boulevard; San Diego, California
- Coordinates: 32°48′21″N 117°12′50″W
- Owner: San Diego Metropolitan Transit System
- Operator: San Diego Trolley
- Platforms: 2 side platforms
- Tracks: 2
- Connections: MTS: 8, 27, 43

Construction
- Structure type: At-grade
- Parking: 227 spaces
- Cycle facilities: 12 lockers
- Accessible: Disabled access

Other information
- Station code: 77774, 77775

History
- Opened: November 21, 2021

Services
Preceding station	San Diego Trolley	Following station
Nobel Drive toward UTC	Blue Line	Clairemont Drive toward San Ysidro
Terminus	Special Event Line	Clairemont Drive toward 12th & Imperial
Location

Balboa Avenue Transit Center is a San Diego Trolley station in San Diego. The station is located along Balboa Avenue between Interstate 5 and Morena Boulevard. Service began on November 21, 2021 after the completion of the Blue Line Mid-Coast Trolley extension project.

The city of San Diego, with input from the Pacific Beach and Clairemont Mesa community planning groups, approved the Balboa Station Area Specific Plan in September 2019.

Artwork from the nearby former Home Savings and Loan building could be incorporated into the station. The Chase bank plans to demolish its building, built in 1977, with eight mosaics by Millard Sheets on the exterior.
