= San Ysidro Transit Center =

San Diego Trolley station

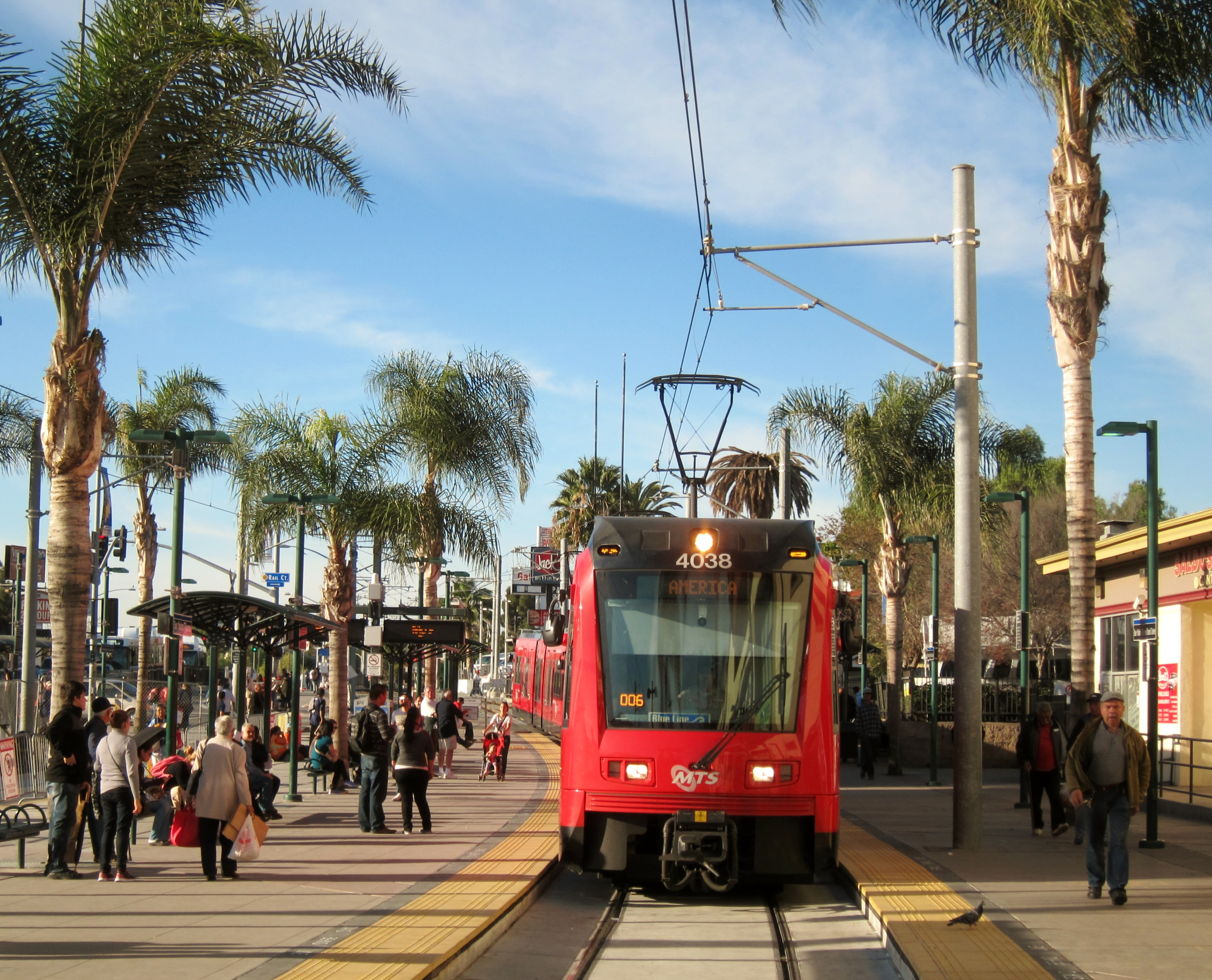
- A trolley at the San Ysidro Transit Center in 2015

General information
- Location: 700 East San Ysidro Boulevard; San Diego, California; United States
- Coordinates: 32°32′40″N 117°01′47″W
- Owner: San Diego Metropolitan Transit System
- Operator: San Diego Trolley
- Platforms: 2 side platforms, 1 island platform
- Tracks: 2
- Connections: MTS: 906, 907, 910 (Overnight Express)

Construction
- Structure type: At-grade
- Accessible: Disabled access

Other information
- Station code: 75000

History
- Opened: July 26, 1981
- Rebuilt: 2015

Services
Preceding station	San Diego Trolley	Following station
Beyer Boulevard toward UTC	Blue Line	Terminus
Former services (at SP station)
Preceding station	Southern Pacific Railroad	Following station
San Diego Terminus	San Diego and Arizona Eastern Railway Main Line	Tijuana toward El Centro
Location

San Ysidro Transit Center is a San Diego Trolley station in the San Ysidro neighborhood of San Diego, California. The station is the southern terminus of the Blue Line and is located on a short rail spur off the San Diego and Arizona Eastern Railway main line which hosts the Blue Line to downtown San Diego.

Located at the southern end of East San Ysidro Boulevard, just north of the San Ysidro Port of Entry at the Mexico–United States border, that station serves primarily as a way to provide transportation for the thousands of international commuters and tourists who travel between San Diego County and Tijuana, Mexico.

It also provides access to the large shopping areas, including Las Americas Premium Outlets, which are connected to the stop via a pedestrian walkway. An intercity bus station is located adjacent to the station. It is the second busiest station in the San Diego Trolley, with nearly 18,000 passengers using the station each day.

== History ==
From the early 20th-century until 1951, San Ysidro was served by a station of the San Diego and Arizona Railway, and later, the SP-owned San Diego and Arizona Eastern Railway. The warehouse-like station building has since become part of the San Diego and Imperial Valley Railroad's San Ysidro freight yard.

San Ysidro Transit Center opened as part of the initial 15.9-mile (25.6 km) "South Line" of the San Diego Trolley system on July 26, 1981, operating from San Ysidro north to downtown San Diego.

This station was scheduled to undergo renovation starting December 2014, as part of the Trolley Renewal Project, though actual renovation construction did not begin until January 2015. Renovation construction at the station continued through December 2015 before completion.

== Future ==
There are future plans for the station. A proposed Purple Line is to start its route at San Ysidro. Moreover, SANDAG has proposed to turn the San Ysidro Transit Center into the San Ysidro Mobility Hub, including by adding a third trolley track to increase Blue Line frequencies, adding a bus lane on East San Ysidro Boulevard, increasing the amount of bus routes, and in the long-term, possibly even adding connections to the Coaster and Amtrak.

Furthermore, future plans for the Blue Line to continue into Tijuana are awaiting approval. If it is to be made, the Blue Line would be extended 1 mile or 1.5 miles on an elevated trackage into a new Tijuana station. This proposal for a "Cross-Border Trolley", supported by SANDAG and officials in Baja California, could take 8 years to complete.

== Bus connections ==
- San Diego Metropolitan Transit System: 906, 907, 910 Overnight Express
- ACN Autobuses
- Damaris Express
- El Corre Caminos
- Executive Lines
- Flixbus
- Fronteras del Norte
- Greyhound Lines
- Greyhound Mexico
- International Bus Lines
- Las Vegas Shuttles
- Rapid Connection
- Saenz Express
- Ticketon
- Tres Estrella de Oro
- TUFESA

== See also ==
- List of San Diego Trolley stations
- Cross Border Xpress
