= Sorrento Valley station =

Passenger train station in San Diego, California, United States

Sorrento Valley
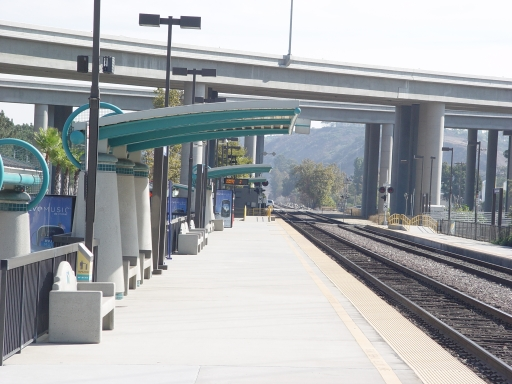
- The north side of the Sorrento Valley station, looking eastward

General information
- Location: 11170 Sorrento Valley Road; San Diego, California
- Coordinates: 32°54′11″N 117°13′30″W
- Owner: North County Transit District
- Line: NCTD San Diego Subdivision
- Platforms: 2 side platforms
- Tracks: 2
- Connections: NCTD FLEX: 473, 479

Construction
- Parking: Yes
- Cycle facilities: 22 rack spaces, 11 lockers
- Accessible: Yes

Other information
- Fare zone: 2

History
- Opened: February 27, 1995

Services
Preceding station	North County Transit District	Following station
Solana Beach toward Oceanside	COASTER	Old Town toward Santa Fe Depot
Former services
Preceding station	Amtrak	Following station
Solana Beach toward San Luis Obispo	Pacific Surfliner 2013–2018	San Diego–Old Town toward San Diego
Future services (2031)
Preceding station	North County Transit District	Following station
Del Mar Fairgrounds Special events only toward Oceanside	COASTER	Old Town toward Santa Fe Depot
Location

Sorrento Valley station is a commuter rail station in the Sorrento Valley neighborhood of San Diego, California, that is on the NCTD COASTER commuter rail line. The station is served by NCTD COASTER Connection shuttles to the businesses east of the station, the community of Torrey Pines, University of California, San Diego, and Westfield UTC mall.

On October 7, 2013, the Amtrak Pacific Surfliner began stopping at four COASTER stations: Carlsbad Village, Carlsbad Poinsettia, Encinitas and Sorrento Valley. The Carlsbad Poinsettia and Encinitas stops were discontinued on October 9, 2017. The Carlsbad Village and Sorrento Valley stops were dropped on October 8, 2018, due to changes with the cross-ticketing arrangement with COASTER and NCTD.
