= Carlsbad Village station =

Commuter rail station in Carlsbad, California

Carlsbad Village
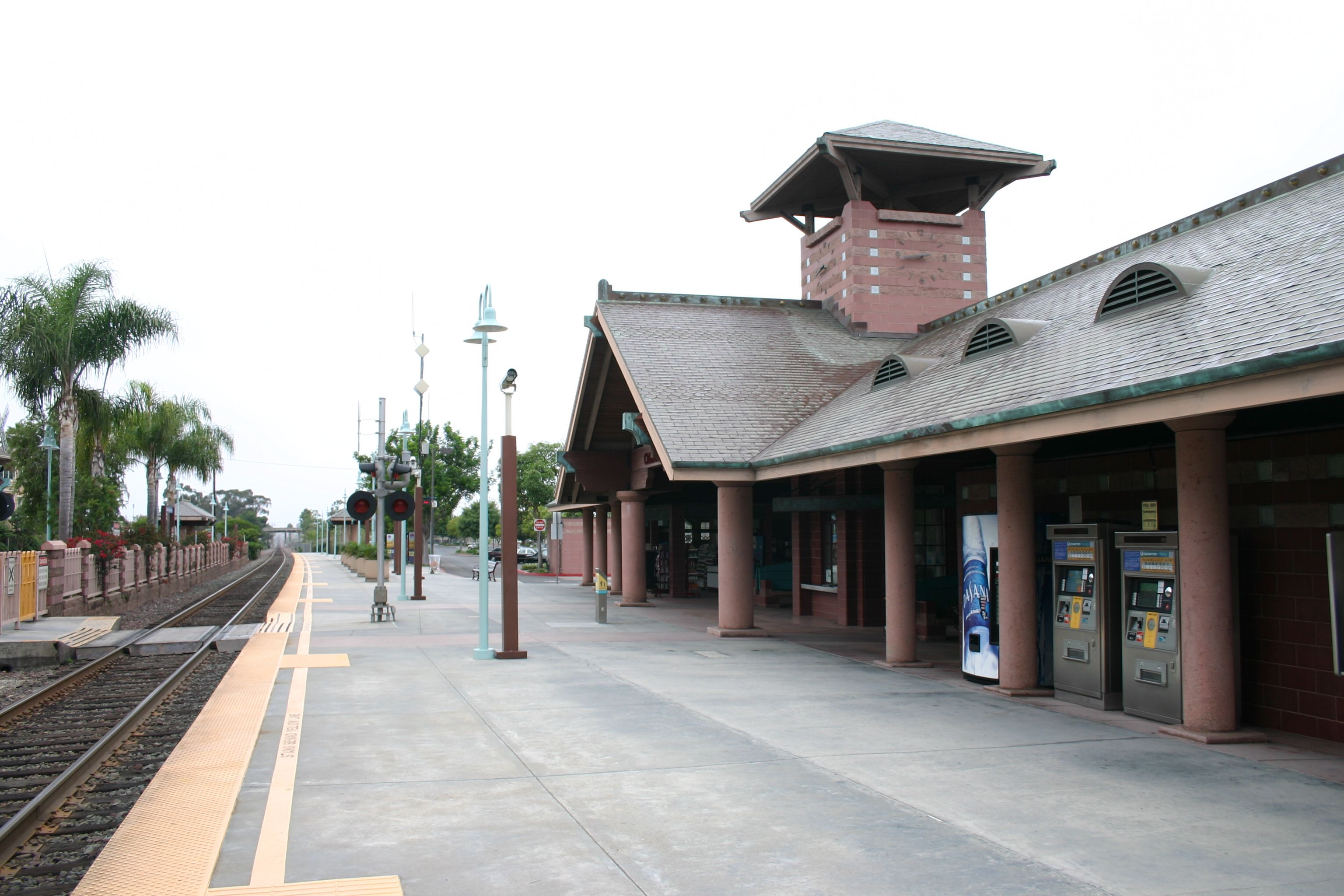
- Carlsbad Village station in October 2010

General information
- Location: 2775 State Street; Carlsbad, California
- Coordinates: 33°09′39″N 117°21′03″W
- Owner: North County Transit District
- Line: NCTD San Diego Subdivision
- Platforms: 1 side platform
- Tracks: 1
- Connections: NCTD BREEZE: 101, 315, 325

Construction
- Parking: Yes
- Cycle facilities: 8 rack spaces, 2 lockers
- Accessible: Yes

Other information
- Fare zone: 1

History
- Opened: February 27, 1995

Services
| Preceding station | North County Transit District | Following station |
|---|---|---|
| Oceanside Terminus | COASTER | Carlsbad Poinsettia toward Santa Fe Depot |
Former services
| Preceding station | Amtrak | Following station |
|---|---|---|
| Oceanside toward San Luis Obispo | Pacific Surfliner 2013–2018 | Carlsbad Poinsettia toward San Diego |
At former Carlsbad station (1887 to 1960)
| Preceding station | Atchison, Topeka and Santa Fe Railway | Following station |
| Oceanside toward Los Angeles | Surf Line | Encinitas toward San Diego |
- Carlsbad Santa Fe Depot
- U.S. National Register of Historic Places
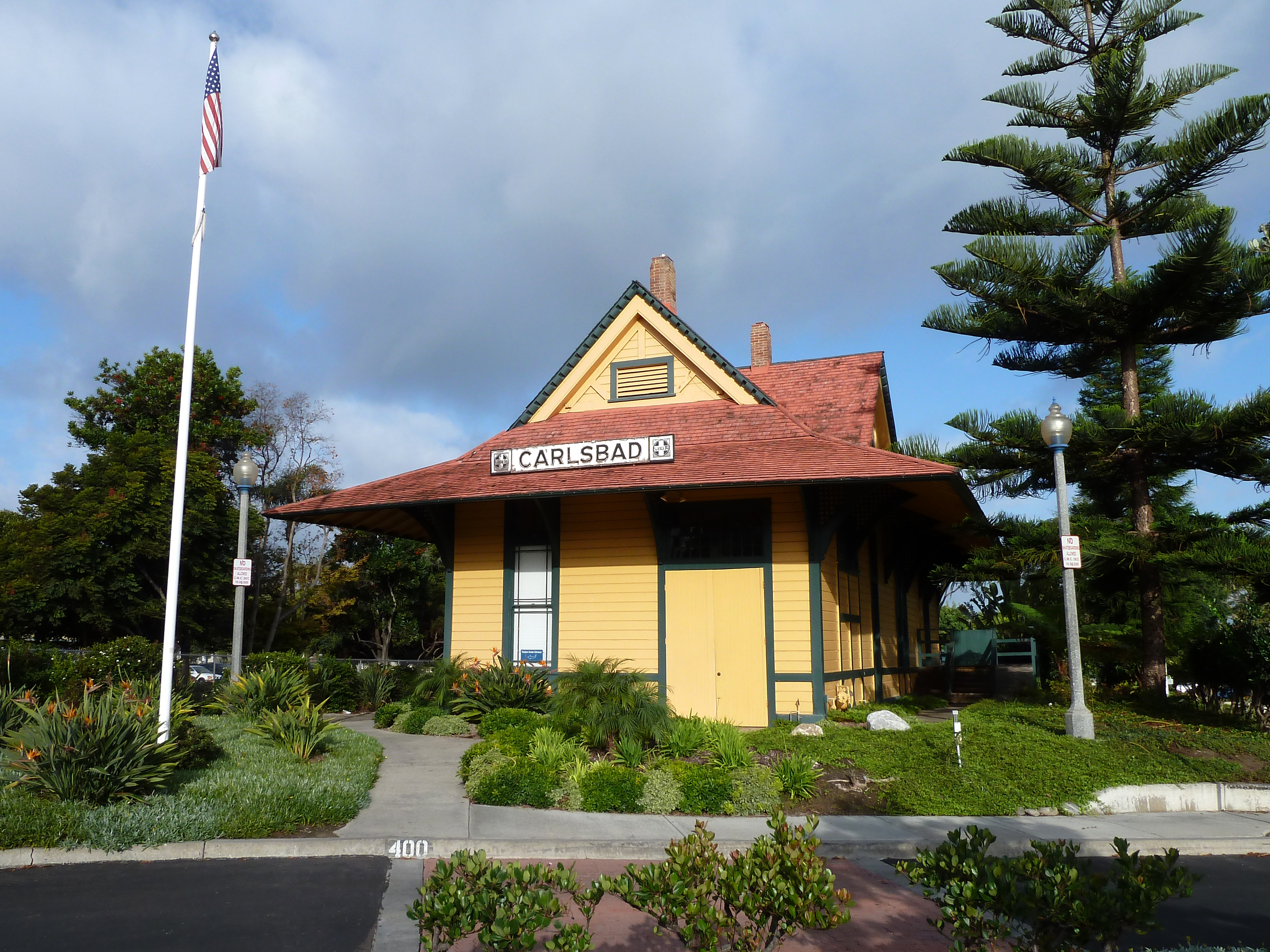
- Coordinates: 33°09′35″N 117°20′59″W
- Built: 1887
- Architect: Fred R. Perris
- NRHP reference No.: 93001016
- Added to NRHP: September 30, 1993
Location

Carlsbad Village station is a commuter rail station in Carlsbad, California, that is on the NCTD COASTER commuter rail line. It is one of two COASTER stations in Carlsbad (the other being Carlsbad Poinsettia station about four miles to the south), and is the last station used for northbound COASTER trains before reaching the northern terminus of the Oceanside Transit Center.

The original Carlsbad station, was constructed in 1887 by the California Southern Railroad, which later became part of the Atchison, Topeka and Santa Fe Railway. It is located 0.1 miles (0.16 km) to the south, at 400 Carlsbad Village Dr. The former station was in use by the railroad until 1960, and now serves as the city's visitor center. It was listed on the National Register of Historic Places in 1993 as the Carlsbad Santa Fe Depot.

On October 7, 2013, the Amtrak Pacific Surfliner began stopping at four COASTER stations: Carlsbad Village, Carlsbad Poinsettia, Encinitas and Sorrento Valley. The Carlsbad Poinsettia and Encinitas stops were discontinued on October 9, 2017, due to low ridership. The Carlsbad Village and Sorrento Valley stops were dropped on October 8, 2018, due to changes with the cross-ticketing arrangement with COASTER and NCTD.

Along with Encinitas station, this is one of two single-track stations on the Coaster line, causing a bottleneck for rail traffic. The tracks at surface level also cause local traffic congestion and safety hazards. For that reason, the Carlsbad City Council has approved an agreement to build a trench for the tracks and complete double track through the Carlsbad Village area.
