= Carlsbad Poinsettia station =

Railway station in Carlsbad, California, United States

Carlsbad Poinsettia
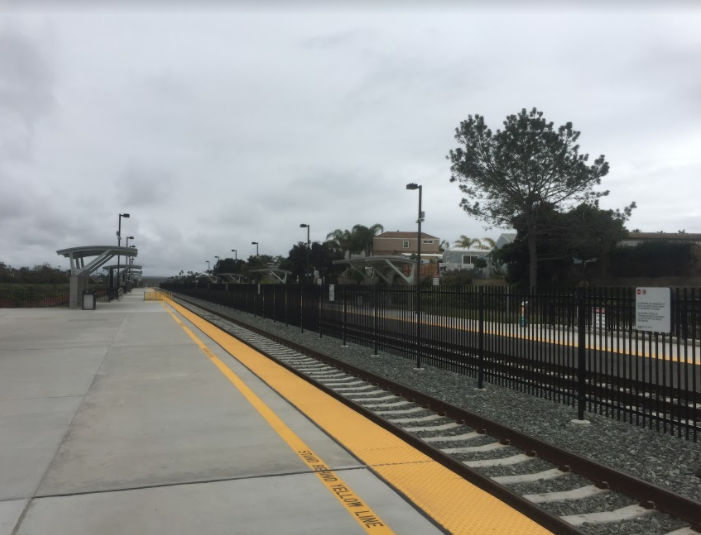
- The renovated station in April 2020 with the new platform extensions, realigned tracks, upgraded signage, lighting fixtures, benches and canopy shelters.

General information
- Location: 6511 Avenida Encinas; Carlsbad, California
- Coordinates: 33°6′33″N 117°19′9″W
- Owner: North County Transit District
- Line: NCTD San Diego Subdivision
- Platforms: 2 side platforms
- Tracks: 2
- Connections: NCTD BREEZE: 445

Construction
- Parking: Yes
- Accessible: Yes

Other information
- Fare zone: 1

History
- Opened: February 27, 1995
- Rebuilt: 2020

Services
Preceding station	North County Transit District	Following station
Carlsbad Village toward Oceanside	COASTER	Encinitas toward Santa Fe Depot
Former services
Preceding station	Amtrak	Following station
Carlsbad Village toward San Luis Obispo	Pacific Surfliner 2013–2017	Encinitas toward San Diego
Location

Carlsbad Poinsettia station is a commuter rail station in Carlsbad, California that is on the NCTD COASTER commuter rail line. The station serves the Poinsettia and La Costa communities of Carlsbad, and is the southernmost of the two COASTER stations in Carlsbad, the other being Carlsbad Village station about four miles to the north. It is also located about four miles away from the LEGOLAND California Theme Park and five miles from McClellan-Palomar Airport; there are transit services that are provided for transport to those destinations.

== History ==
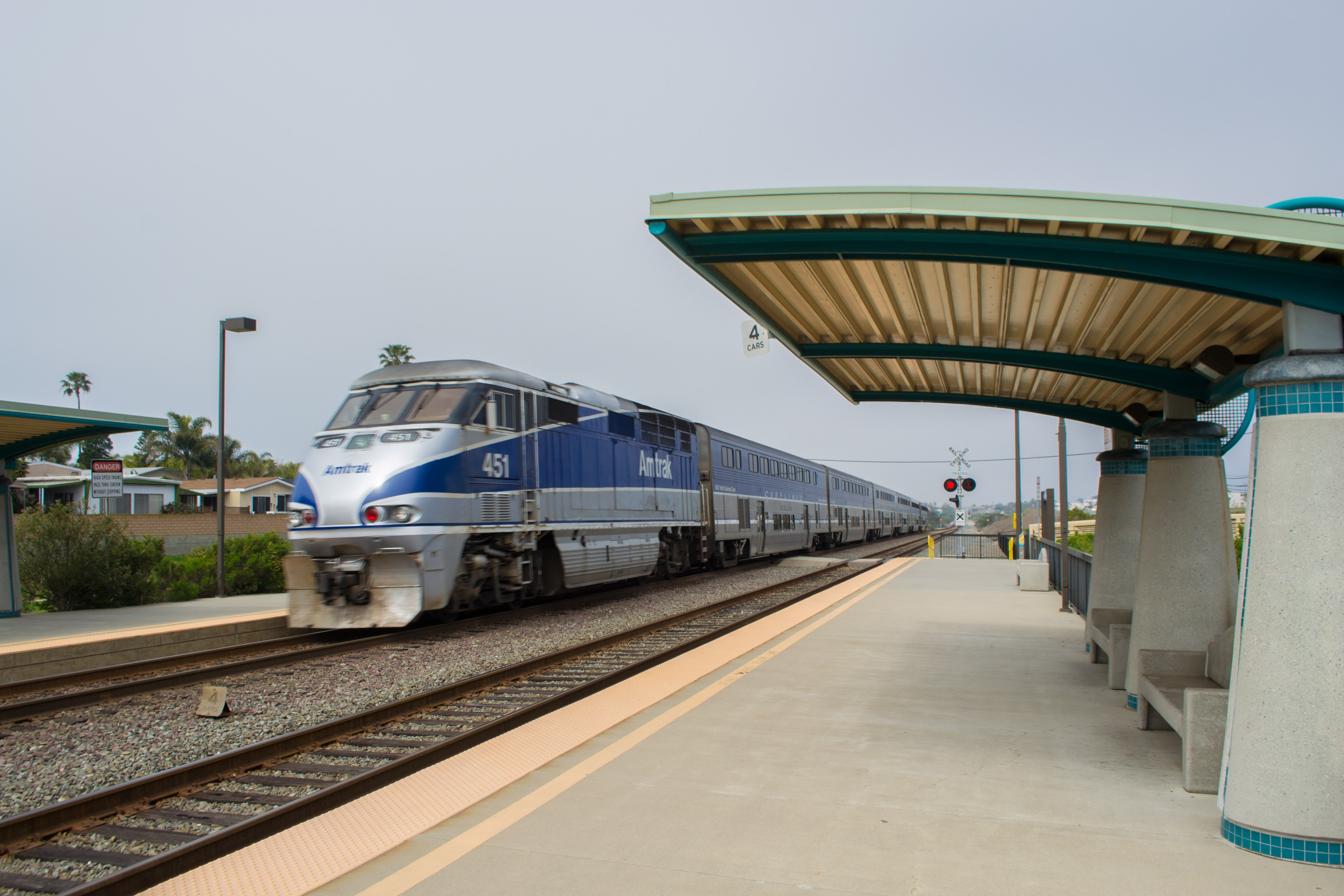
A Pacific Surfliner train passing through the station in 2013

Prior to the introduction of NCTD commuter rail service, the Atchison, Topeka and Santa Fe Railway operated the San Diegan along the Los Angeles–San Diego coastal rail corridor, with a former flag stop in southern Carlsbad, then known as Ponto station, within the current site of the Carlsbad Poinsettia station.

The station opened along with the other COASTER stations when rail service began on February 27, 1995, servicing the southern communities of Carlsbad in contrast with Carlsbad Village station.

On October 7, 2013, the Amtrak Pacific Surfliner began stopping at four COASTER stations: Carlsbad Village, Carlsbad Poinsettia, Encinitas, and Sorrento Valley. Amtrak dropped service to Carlsbad Poinsettia and Encinitas on October 9, 2017, due to low ridership.Amtrak dropped service at Carlsbad Village and Sorrento Valley on October 8, 2018, due to changes with the cross-ticketing arrangement with COASTER and NCTD.

With increasing ridership and a demand for expansion, the station underwent a thirty-four million dollar renovation beginning in May 2018. The platforms were lengthened to 1,000 feet (300 m) to accommodate longer trains, and were also raised for accessibility and easier boarding. A pedestrian underpass was constructed (replacing the two at-grade pedestrian crossings at either end of the platforms) and fencing was placed between the tracks, allowing two trains to pass through the station at one time. In addition, the tracks and platforms were realigned slightly west of their old locations, and new signage and canopies were installed. The project was completed in February 2020.
