= Downtown San Diego station =

Proposed passenger train station in San Diego, California, United States

Downtown

General information
- Location: San Diego, California
- Coordinates: 32°42′29″N 117°09′44″W
- Owner: North County Transit District
- Line: BNSF San Diego Subdivision
- Platforms: 1 side platform
- Tracks: 2

Construction
- Accessible: Yes

History
- Opening: 2027

Future services
Preceding station	North County Transit District	Following station
Santa Fe Depot toward Oceanside	COASTER	Terminus
Location

Downtown San Diego station is a planned Coaster commuter rail station in San Diego, California. The station will be built in conjunction with upgrades to the BNSF Railway corridor and adds a pocket track to allow greater service frequencies. A new passenger platform will be located between 1st and 5th Streets. The station is in the vicinity of the Gaslamp Quarter, San Diego Convention Center, and Petco Park; it will further provide connections to the San Diego Trolley at the adjacent Convention Center station and Gaslamp Quarter station. Improvements were funded partly by a Trade Corridor Enhancement Program grant, derived from Road Repair and Accountability Act revenues, and partly by BNSF.

As of February 2026, construction on the Downtown Platform is scheduled to begin in the spring. After 18 months of construction, the station will likely open in late-2027 or early-2028.
