= Surf Line =

Rail line in Southern California from Los Angeles to San Diego

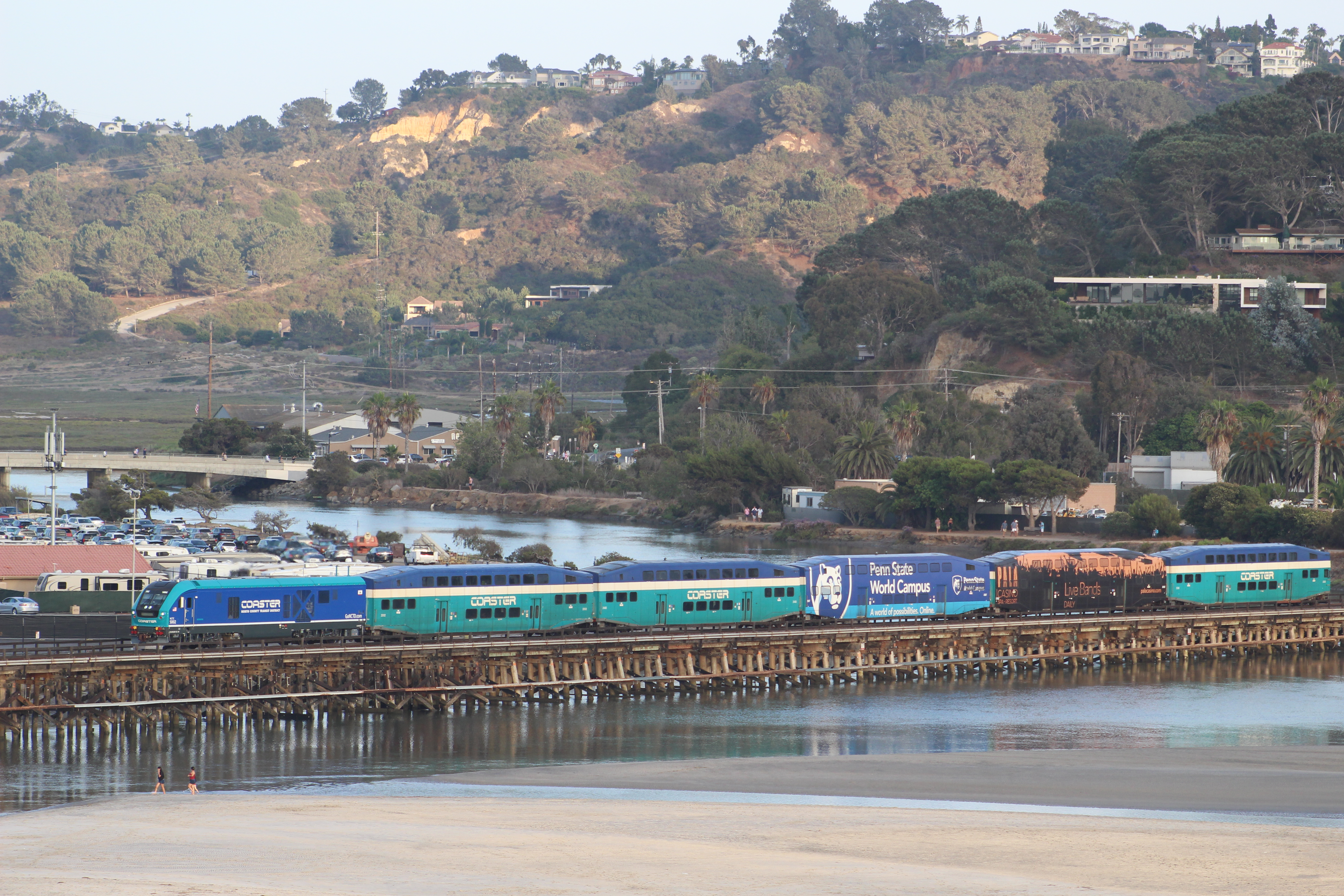
- Coaster train passes through Del Mar on the Surf Line in July 2021

Overview
- Status: Operational
- Owner: BNSF Railway (Los Angeles–Fullerton); SCRRA (Tracks, Fullerton–OC/SD County line); OCTA (right of way); NCTD (OC/SD County line–San Diego)
- Locale: Southern California
- Termini: Los Angeles; San Diego
- Stations: 34 (11 Amtrak stations, 23 commuter rail stations)

Service
- Type: Inter-city rail; Higher-speed rail; Commuter rail
- System: Amtrak (through SCRRA); NCTD; BNSF Railway
- Operators: Amtrak; Amtrak California; Metrolink; Coaster
- Ridership: 2,043,059 (FY 25) ▲3% (Note: Amtrak's Fiscal Year (FY) runs from October 1 of the prior year to September 30 of the named year.)

History
- Opened: 1882 (first section); 1885 (final section)

Technical
- Track length: 128 mi (206 km)
- Num of tracks: 1–4
- Track gauge: 4 ft 8 1/2 in (1,435 mm) standard gauge
- Electrification: Overhead line, 25 kV 60 Hz AC (Los Angeles–Anaheim, 2030–2033) (Note: Though no set timeline or finalization of the portion of Phase 1 of the California High-Speed Rail between Los Angeles and Anaheim, it is possible that two of the four tracks would be used for passenger trains, which would also include Amtrak intercity trains and Metrolink commuter trains, with the two other tracks for BNSF Railway freight trains.)

The Surf Line is a railroad line that runs from San Diego to Orange County along California's Pacific coast. It was so named because much of the line is near the Pacific Ocean, within less than 100 feet (30 m) in some places. It is the second busiest passenger rail corridor in the United States after the Northeast Corridor.

The tracks are now owned by Metrolink in Orange County and the North County Transit District (NCTD) in San Diego County (Note: While North County Transit District owns the track and right of way in San Diego County, Metrolink only owns the tracks in Orange County, with the right of way owned by the Orange County Transportation Authority) and hosts Metrolink's Orange County Line and Inland Empire–Orange County Line, San Diego County's Coaster, and Amtrak Pacific Surfliner passenger trains. BNSF Railway operates freight over the line using trackage rights.

== History ==
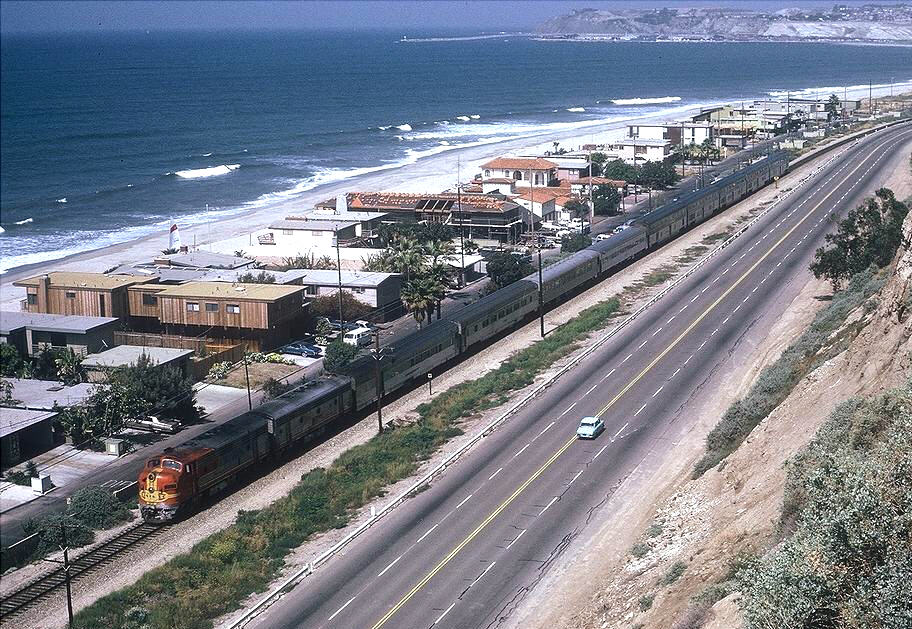
The southbound San Diegan passes through Capistrano Beach, California on the Surf Line in April 1973.

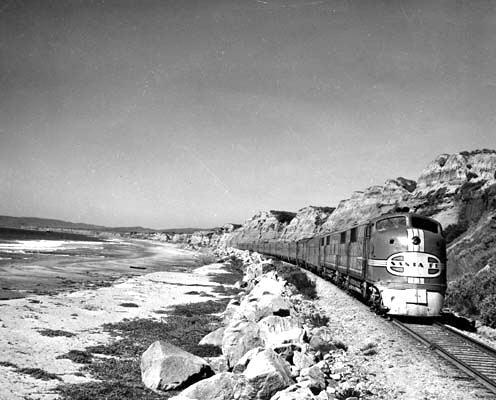
San Diegan in San Clemente, c. 1940s

Construction of the Surf Line between Los Angeles and San Diego began on October 12, 1880, with the organization of the California Southern Railroad Company. On January 2, 1882, the California Southern commenced passenger and freight service between National City and Fallbrook Junction, just north of Oceanside. From Oceanside the line turned northeast for a winding route through the Temecula Canyon, and was finished on August 21, 1882. The section through Del Mar was built in 1881 but was originally built on an alignment about a block inland from the ocean. It was moved to its current location, along the seaside bluffs, in 1910, because the grade was less steep and there were fewer crossings.

The line became part of the Atchison, Topeka and Santa Fe Railroad's transcontinental rail line in 1885 via an extension of the California Southern from Colton north over the Cajon Pass to Barstow. From 1886 to 1888, the Riverside, Santa Ana and Los Angeles Railway built a branch from Highgrove southwest via Riverside to Santa Ana and from Orange (just north of Santa Ana) northwest to Los Angeles. Also in 1888 the San Bernardino and San Diego Railway completed its line from Oceanside north to Santa Ana, completing what was originally called the Los Angeles–San Diego Short Line. The now-downgraded old route was destroyed by floods in 1891 and the new line, later named the Surf Line, was now the only line to San Diego from the north.

In 1910, the Fullerton and Richfield Railway built a short cutoff of the San Bernardino–Los Angeles route from Atwood west to Fullerton, giving the Surf Line its northern terminus of Fullerton.

For much of the 20th century, the Surf Line (officially, the Fourth District of the Los Angeles Division) was to the Santa Fe what the New York City–Philadelphia corridor was to the Pennsylvania Railroad. Daily traffic could reach a density of ten trains (each way) during the summer months. The route hosted AT&SF San Diegan passenger trains, renamed the Pacific Surfliner by Amtrak in 2000. The Santa Fe installed centralized traffic control in 1943–1944 which increased capacity on the line.

Santa Fe sold the line to local transportation authorities in 1992, with ownership split between the Southern California Regional Rail Authority in Orange County and the San Diego Northern Railway in San Diego County.

== Operations ==
The route is the southerly portion of the 351-mile-long (565 km) LOSSAN Rail Corridor between San Luis Obispo and San Diego. Local agencies along the route formed the Los Angeles–San Diego-San Luis Obispo Rail Corridor Agency (LOSSAN) in 1989. Commuter trains began operating in the 1990s, initially as an outgrowth of existing Amtrak services until the establishment of Metrolink and Coaster by the California State Legislature in 1992. Coaster runs within San Diego County, between San Diego and Oceanside, while Metrolink's services operate north of Oceanside. Amtrak's Pacific Surfliner travels throughout the corridor. The San Diego Trolley light rail shares the Surf Line's right of way in San Diego, running adjacent to the heavy rail tracks. For about a mile in Oceanside, the Sprinter service parallels the Surf Line before heading east on the Escondido Subdivision towards Escondido, California.

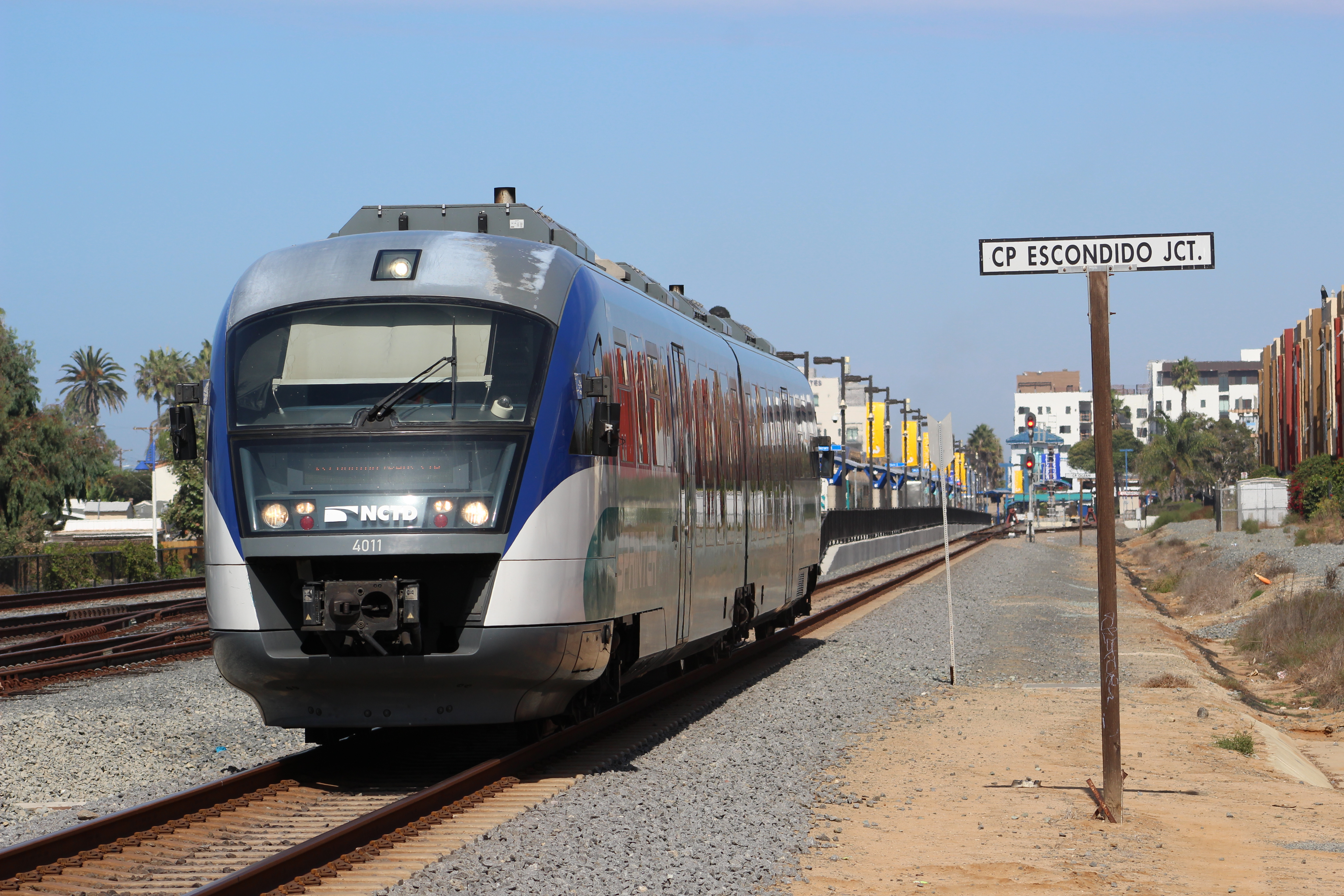
Sprinter train departing from Oceanside

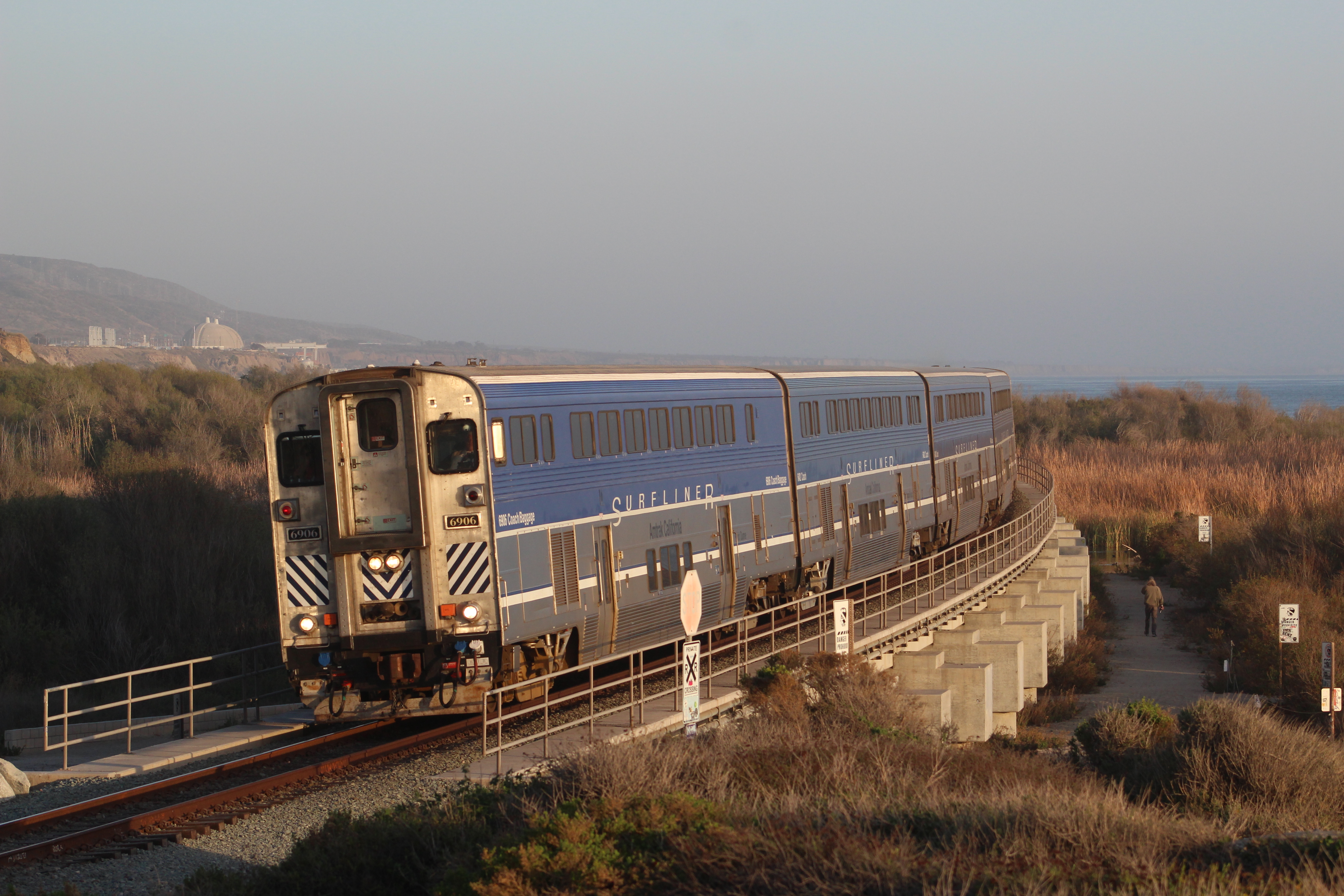
Pacific Surfliner 785 passing over Trestles Bridge

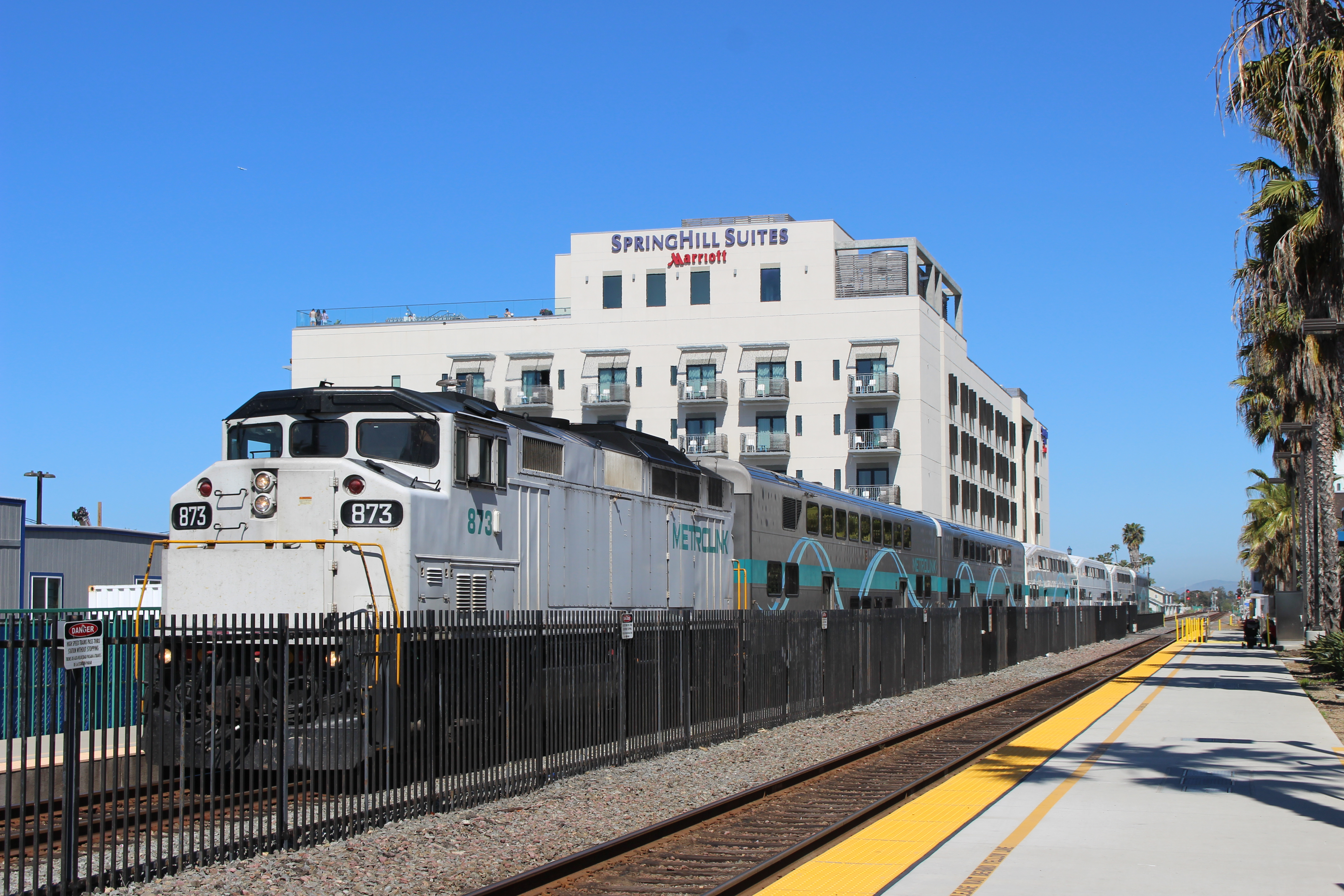
Metrolink train enters Oceanside station

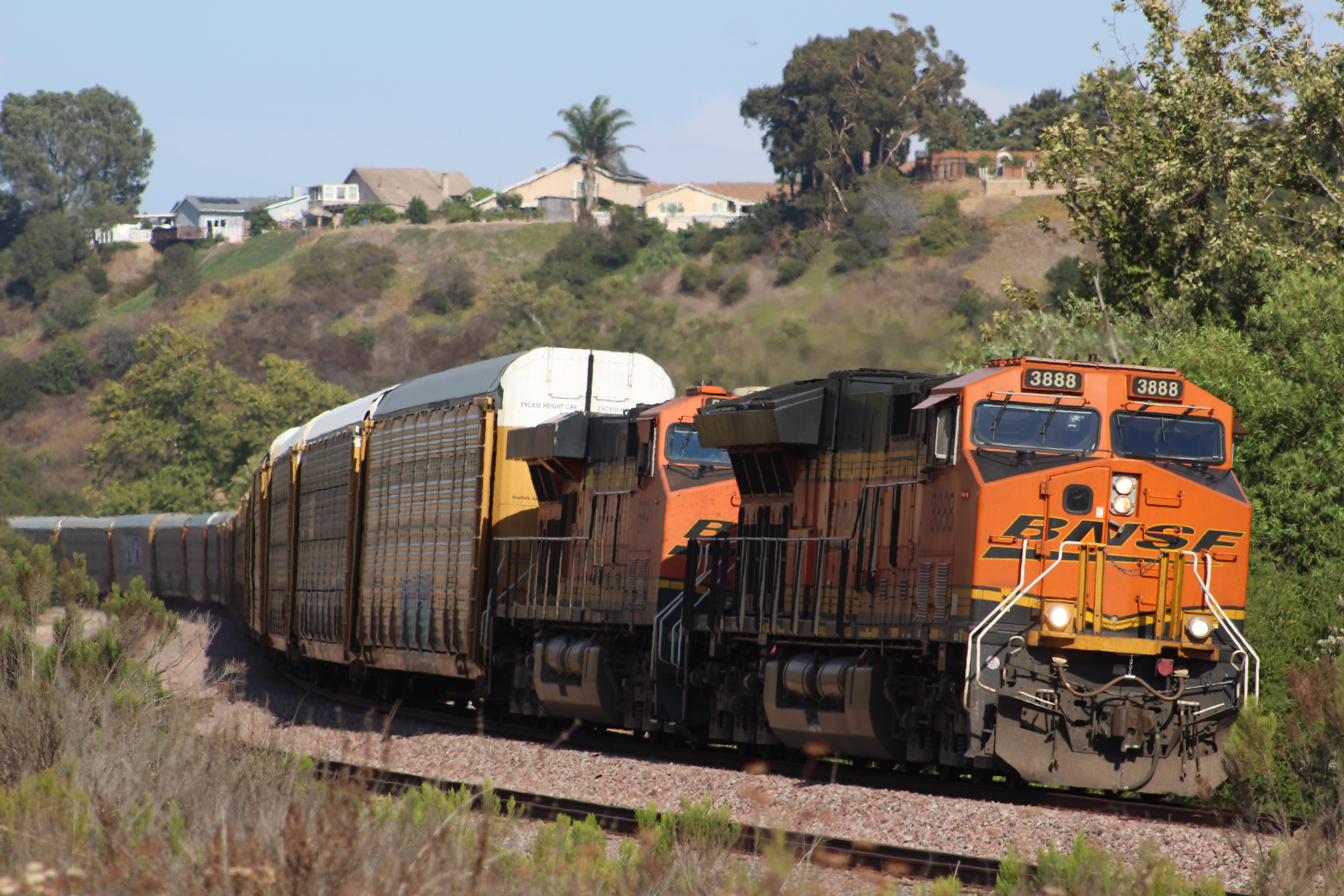
Southbound BNSF "daygo" freight train near San Diego

Freight traffic includes military vehicles and equipment to Camp Pendleton and the Navy ports in San Diego. Due to passenger trains running on a daily schedule, BNSF manifest freight trains run through the Surf Line often at night, which is dubbed as the "Daygo".

The Surf Line is the second busiest rail corridor in the United States, after the Northeast Corridor between Washington D.C. and Boston, as the Surf Line hosts the Pacific Surfliner, the third busiest Amtrak route behind the Acela and Northeast Regional, which run on the Northeast Corridor. As trains on the Surf Line traverse speeds up to 90 mph (140 km/h) on portions of the route in Orange County and San Diego County, there are plans to upgrade tracks to Class 6 trackage, which can run at speeds of 110 mph (180 km/h), when funding is available.

About two-thirds of the 60-mile (97 km) segment from the Orange County line to the Santa Fe Depot in downtown San Diego has been double-tracked. As one of the nation's busiest corridors, local transportation and planning agencies want to complete the entire section. A 2.6-mile (4.2 km) section of double track between Elvira (SR 52) and Morena (Balboa Avenue) was completed in July 2020. The $192 million project, which began in August 2015, completed 14.6 miles (23.5 km) of double track from San Diego northward.

The segment of the LOSSAN Corridor within San Diego County achieved full implementation of positive train control in December 2018, for all passenger and freight trains operating on this segment.

== Track issues ==
Due to its location along the beaches of Southern California, the line faces persistent issues due to sea level rise and coastal erosion, exacerbated by climate change. The tracks run atop coastal bluffs some 40 feet (12 m) above the beach for 1.7 miles (2.7 km) in Del Mar. Another segment along the San Clemente coast on a low-lying section of track crosses an ancient, recurring landslide. Aggravated by storms and high tides, waves sometimes crash across these rails at high tide that are close to the surf on the narrow beach. The eroding bluffs above the tracks in at least three locations require temporary closure of the tracks until conditions can be stabilized. Extra funding for maintenance of both sections continues to be sought to keep them in operation as long-term solutions are developed.

=== Del Mar Bluffs ===
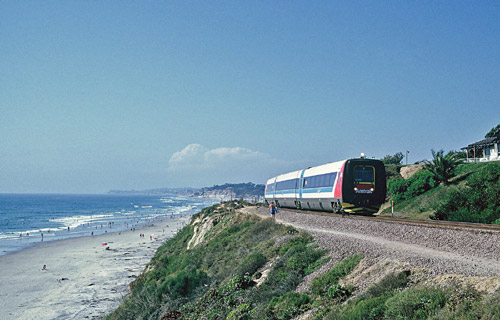
An Israel Railways IC3 being tested on the San Diegan, passing over the Del Mar Bluff in July 1996

Coastal erosion eats away at the Del Mar bluffs each year and the rate has accelerated due to sea level rise due to climate change. The bluffs erode by about six inches every year. The bluff has had to be shored up to safely run current operations. Steel beams were driven into the beach at the base of the bluff in September 2020 to stabilize the face of the bluff for 20 or 30 years. In August, the California Coastal Commission had emphasized the need to move the railroad tracks inland as they reviewed the emergency permits for the stabilization work. The San Diego Association of Governments (SANDAG) is conducting a $3 million study on relocating the rail line. A tunnel under Del Mar, which would cost more than $3 billion, is under consideration. In 2022, $300 million was included in the state budget for the SANDAG so that the project can compete for federal matching funds. Local leaders, including SANDAG's executive director, showed Secretary of Transportation Pete Buttigieg the coastal erosion at the bluffs in October 2022. Del Mar City Council approved a list of guiding principles for the relocation on November 13, 2023. More than a dozen possible routes for the tunnel have been considered by SANDAG. Residents have expressed concerns about the shortest and fastest routed that would take trains beneath residential properties.

=== San Clemente beach ===
With extensive beach erosion, waves crashing over the rails damaged the tracks in San Clemente on September 15, 2021. The segment had to be shut down through October 3 as storms and high tides had aggravated the situation. An extended closure occurred the next year when the segment was closed to passenger traffic on September 29, 2022, due to soil movement; freight traffic continued at lowered speed. Additional rock was added between the beach and the railroad tracks after each incident. The passenger rail traffic stop continued as anchors were being placed into bedrock. The line fully reopened in April 2023 but rail service was halted again two miles to the north. Falling debris did not damage the tracks but ground movement continued from a landslide involving Casa Romantica on the bluff above. Full service resumed in late May but was halted indefinitely again in early June. During the work closures, freight trains are able to resume at a speed of 10 miles per hour (16 km/h) as officials were on site to clear them when it is safe to proceed. Orange County Transportation Authority (OCTA), which owns the section of track, declared an emergency on June 12 to speed up construction of temporary barrier wall at the bottom of the slope. The 250-foot-long (76 m) barrier is 12 feet (3.7 m) high with the piles set roughly 32 feet (9.8 m) into the ground. Service resumed on July 19, 2023. The bluffs can become unstable after a rainstorm soaks the slope. Service was suspended on January 25, 2024, due to a landslide from private property north of the San Clemente Pier. Two damaged sections of the Mariposa Pedestrian Bridge on the slope above the tracks had to be removed. California Transportation Commission initially awarded $2 million to clean up the debris and added $7.2 million in February to help repair the rail line. A barrier wall similar to the one at the Casa Romantica slide will be constructed. Limited service through the landslide area resumed on March 6. Full service then resumed on March 25. OCTA says $7 million is needed to study realignment and other possible solutions to protect 7 miles (11 km) of the line along the shore. The first study, that started in August 2023, will identify the issues that impact the rail corridor, offer solutions to protect it, and develop the cost of the necessary improvements.

== Historic station stops ==
Many, but not all of these stations currently operate. Many of these stations no longer exist (e.g. Linda Vista) and new ones have opened (e.g. Sorrento Valley). For a list of stations that currently operate, see the articles for Metrolink's Orange County Line and the Coaster or the templates to the right.

Key:	Open	Closed	Proposed

Municipality	Station	mi (km)	Services	Opened	Closed
Los Angeles (Downtown)	Los Angeles		Amtrak: Coast Starlight, Pacific Surfliner, Southwest Chief, Sunset Limited/Texas Eagle; Metrolink: 91/Perris Valley Antelope Valley Orange County Riverside San Bernardino Ventura County; Metro: A Line, B Line, D Line, J Line; Amtrak Thruway: 1; FlyAway to LAX; Los Angeles Metro Bus, Antelope Valley Transit Authority, Big Blue Bus, City of Commerce Transit, City of Santa Clarita Transit, Dodger Stadium Express, LADOT Commuter Express, LADOT DASH, Torrance Transit; FlixBus	May 3, 1939	
Los Angeles (Downtown)	La Grande Station		ATSF services (formerly)	July 29, 1893	May 3, 1939
Commerce	Commerce		Metrolink: Orange County	July 28, 1993	
Pico Rivera	Rivera		ATSF services (formerly)		Before 1948
Los Nietos	Los Nietos		ATSF services (formerly)		Before 1948
Santa Fe Springs	Santa Fe Springs		ATSF services (formerly)		Before 1948
Norwalk	Norwalk/Santa Fe Springs		Metrolink: 91/Perris Valley, Orange County	July 17, 1995	
La Mirada	La Mirada		ATSF services (formerly)		Before 1948
Buena Park
Buena Park	Buena Park (Santa Fe)		ATSF services (formerly)		Before 1948
Buena Park	Buena Park		Metrolink: 91/Perris Valley, Orange County	September 4, 2007	
Fullerton	Fullerton		Amtrak: Pacific Surfliner, Southwest Chief; Metrolink: 91/Perris Valley Orange County; Amtrak Thruway: 39; OC Bus	1888	
SCRRA Orange Subdivision begins
Anaheim	Anaheim	170.6 (275)	Amtrak: Pacific Surfliner; Metrolink: Orange County; Anaheim Resort Transportation, OC Bus; Flixbus	2014 (newest station)	
Orange	Orange	172.6 (278)	Metrolink: Inland Empire–Orange County Orange County; OC Bus; Chapman University Shuttle	1888	
Santa Ana	Santa Ana	175.2 (282)	Amtrak: Pacific Surfliner; Metrolink: Inland Empire–Orange County Orange County; OC Bus; Greyhound	September 8, 1985 (newest station)	
Tustin	Tustin	175.2 (282)	Metrolink: Inland Empire–Orange County Orange County; OC Bus, including iShuttle	January 18, 2002	
Irvine	Irvine	185.0 (298)	Amtrak: Pacific Surfliner; Metrolink: Inland Empire–Orange County Orange County; OC Bus, including iShuttle	June 1, 1990	
Irvine	Irvine (Santa Fe station)		ATSF services (formerly)	1889	1947
El Toro	El Toro		ATSF services (formerly)	1939 or earlier	1961 or later
Laguna Niguel	Laguna Niguel/Mission Viejo	193.5 (311)	Metrolink: Inland Empire–Orange County Orange County; OC Bus	April 19, 2002	
San Juan Capistrano	San Juan Capistrano	197.2 (317)	Amtrak: Pacific Surfliner; Metrolink: Inland Empire–Orange County Orange County; OC Bus	October 27, 1894	
Serra	Serra (Doheny Park)		ATSF services (formerly)		1939 or later
San Clemente	San Clemente	203.6 (328)	Metrolink: Inland Empire–Orange County Orange County; OC Bus	March 6, 1995	
San Clemente	San Clemente Pier	204.8 (330)	Amtrak: Pacific Surfliner (limited service); Metrolink: Inland Empire–Orange County Orange County (weekends only); San Clemente Trolley	1931	
San Clemente	San Onofre		ATSF services (formerly)		1961 or later
Las Flores	Las Flores		ATSF services (formerly)		Before 1948
SCRRA Orange Subdivision ends; NCTD San Diego Subdivision begins
Oceanside	Oceanside	226.4 (364)	Amtrak: Pacific Surfliner; Coaster; Sprinter; Metrolink: Inland Empire–Orange County Orange County; NCTD Breeze; Greyhound	1984 (oldest station 1886)	
Carlsbad	Carlsbad Village	229.2 (369)	Coaster; NCTD Breeze: 101, 315, 325	February 27, 1995	
Carlsbad	Carlsbad Santa Fe Depot		ATSF services (formerly)	1887	1960
Carlsbad	Carlsbad Poinsettia	233.3 (375)	Coaster; NCTD Breeze: 444, 445	February 27, 1995	
Encinitas	Encinitas (Santa Fe station)		ATSF services (formerly)		1960s
Encinitas	Encinitas	237.7 (383)	Coaster; NCTD Breeze: 101, 304, 309	February 27, 1995	
Encinitas	Cardiff		ATSF services (formerly)		1953 or later
Solana Beach
Solana Beach	Solana Beach (Santa Fe)		ATSF services (formerly)		1953 or later
Solana Beach	Solana Beach	241.8 (389)	Amtrak: Pacific Surfliner; Coaster; NCTD Breeze	February 6, 1995	
Del Mar
Del Mar	Del Mar		Formerly: Amtrak: San Diegan (1971-1995); ATSF services (pre-1971)	1910	1995
Del Mar	Del Mar Fairgrounds		Amtrak: Pacific Surfliner; Coaster	2028 (proposed)	
San Diego	Sorrento Valley	249.0 (401)	Coaster; NCTD COASTER Connection: 473, 479 (Note: Replacing MTS bus routes 972, 973, 978, and 979, also known as the Sorrento Valley Coaster Connection (SVCC), effective June 10, 2024.)	February 27, 1995	
San Diego	Sorrento (Santa Fe)		ATSF services (formerly)		1953 or later
San Diego	Linda Vista		ATSF services (formerly)		1953 or later
San Diego	San Diego–Old Town	264.2 (425)	Amtrak: Pacific Surfliner; Coaster; San Diego Trolley: Blue Line, Green Line; Metropolitan Transit System; San Diego Flyer shuttle; University of San Diego shuttle; Flixbus		
San Diego	San Diego	267.5 (430)	Amtrak: Pacific Surfliner; Coaster; San Diego Trolley: Blue Line, Green Line; Metropolitan Transit System	March 7, 1915	
NCTD San Diego Subdivision ends; BNSF San Diego Subdivision begins
San Diego
San Diego	Downtown San Diego		Coaster	2027 (planned)	
San Diego	22nd Street station		ATSF services (formerly)		Between 1913 and 1926
National City	National City		ATSF services (formerly)	1882	1930

== See also ==
- The Coast Line, continuing north from Los Angeles to San Francisco. It is owned by the Southern California Regional Rail Authority (SCRRA) between Los Angeles and Moorpark, and the Union Pacific Railroad from Moorpark onwards.
- History of rail transportation in California
- Other major rail corridors in the United States with tracks owned by Amtrak:
  - Northeast Corridor
  - Philadelphia to Harrisburg Main Line
  - New Haven–Springfield Line
  - Chicago–Detroit Line
