= Solana Beach station =

Passenger train station in Solana Beach, California, United States

Solana Beach
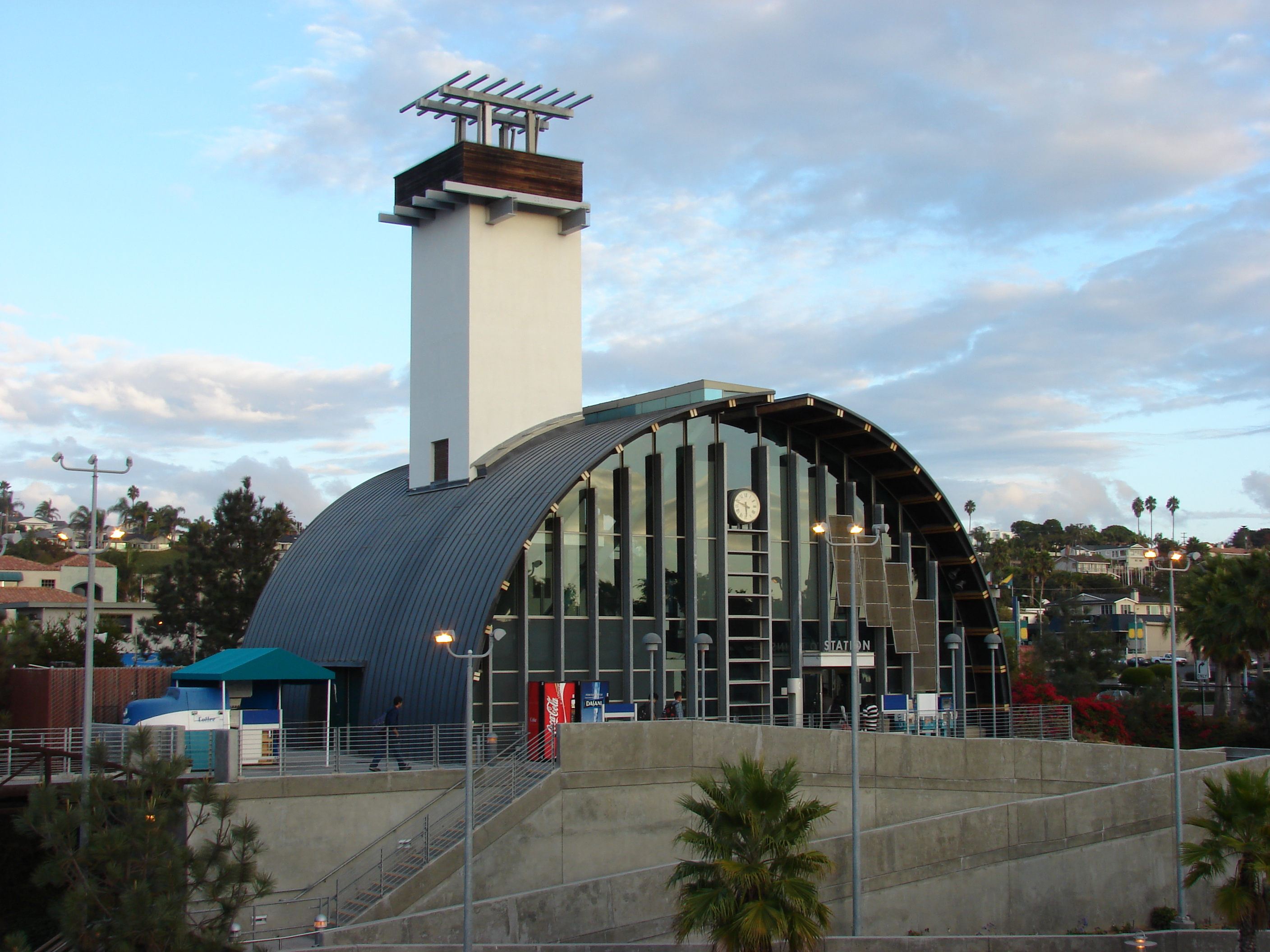
- The exterior of Solana Beach station

General information
- Other names: Solana Beach Transit Center
- Location: 105 North Cedros Avenue; Solana Beach, California; United States
- Coordinates: 32°59′34″N 117°16′17″W
- Owner: North County Transit District
- Line: NCTD San Diego Subdivision
- Platforms: 2 side platforms
- Tracks: 2
- Connections: NCTD BREEZE: 101, 308

Construction
- Parking: Yes
- Cycle facilities: Yes
- Accessible: Yes

Other information
- Status: Staffed, station building with waiting room
- Station code: Amtrak: SOL
- Fare zone: 1 (COASTER)

History
- Opened: February 6, 1995; 31 years ago (Amtrak); February 27, 1995; 31 years ago (COASTER)

Passengers
- FY 2025: 202,986 (Amtrak)

Services
Preceding station	Amtrak	Following station
Oceanside toward San Luis Obispo	Pacific Surfliner	San Diego–Old Town toward San Diego
Preceding station	North County Transit District	Following station
Encinitas toward Oceanside	COASTER	Sorrento Valley toward Santa Fe Depot
Former services
(at previous stations)
At Del Mar station (1910-1995)
Preceding station	Amtrak	Following station
Oceanside toward Los Angeles	San Diegan	San Diego Terminus
Preceding station	Atchison, Topeka and Santa Fe Railway	Following station
Encinitas toward Los Angeles	Surf Line	San Diego Terminus
Solana Beach Pre-1950s toward Los Angeles	Surf Line	Sorrento Pre-1950s toward San Diego
At former Solana Beach station (pre-1950s)
Preceding station	Atchison, Topeka and Santa Fe Railway	Following station
Cardiff toward Los Angeles	Surf Line	Del Mar toward San Diego
Future services (2031)
Preceding station	Amtrak	Following station
Oceanside toward San Luis Obispo	Pacific Surfliner	Del Mar Fairgrounds Special events only toward San Diego
Preceding station	North County Transit District	Following station
Encinitas toward Oceanside	COASTER	Del Mar Fairgrounds Special events only toward Santa Fe Depot
Location

Solana Beach station, also known as the Solana Beach Transit Center, is a train station on Amtrak California's Pacific Surfliner passenger train and on North County Transit District's COASTER commuter rail route located in Solana Beach, California. The tracks were lowered to their current position in the late 1990s, to alleviate congestion on Lomas Santa Fe Road and Downtown Solana Beach. Two tracks carry the Surf Line in a trench through the city of Solana Beach, including the station.

The station was designed by architect Rob Wellington Quigley, and was built in 1994 to replace the aging depot in Del Mar, California, two miles south which had been in use since the early 1900s. Funding for the station included $2.8 million from Proposition 116, which was a ballot initiative that designated $1.99 billion for passenger rail projects. An additional $3.3 million used for land acquisition and design was obtained through Transnet, a half-cent county sales tax. Quigley drew inspiration for the design from a group of Quonset huts that used to line North Cedros Avenue in the 1940s. To the basic semi-circular form of the hut, the architect added a tower reminiscent of those found on many train depots dating to the second half of the 19th century.

In the late 1990s, an $18 million project lowered the tracks and station platforms. This allowed for another track and platform and improved safety by eliminating the railroad crossing located south of the station.

In 2014, Solana Beach and the North County Transit District requested proposals to convert the station and some of the adjacent surface parking into offices, a restaurant and an underground parking structure. This could involve the station being repurposed with ticket sales and other train services moved to the train track level. The parking garage could complement the nearby Cedros Design District and adjacent Coast Highway 101. Neither of the two submitted proposals were selected.

Of the 73 California stations served by Amtrak, Solana Beach was the tenth-busiest in FY2010, boarding or detraining an average of approximately 1100 passengers daily. In 2021, Amtrak reports Solana Beach as 14th busiest in California with 94,621 riders in the year.

== Former Amtrak station at Del Mar ==
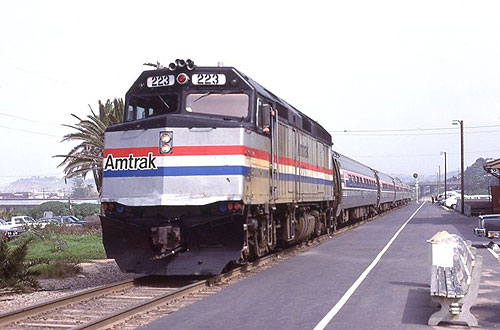
Amtrak San Diegan at Del Mar in 1983

The former Del Mar station served passengers from the early 1900s until its closure in 1995, and for much of that time was the only passenger stop between Oceanside and San Diego. Solana Beach station was planned from the beginning not only as a stop for both Amtrak and commuter trains, but also as a major local bus hub. As a result, the future of Del Mar station, just two miles south, fell into doubt as early as 1989. At that time a committee of the San Diego Association Of Governments (SANDAG) voted in favor of its closure, citing the limited availability of parking, the lack of accessibility, and the logistical difficulty accommodating bus and shuttle service. Any one of these problems, by itself, would have been a serious deficiency if Del Mar was to serve both commuters and Amtrak passengers. The Del Mar City Council rejected any significant expansion of the facility, while still hoping to keep it in operation as an Amtrak-only station, but Amtrak rejected this possibility, deciding in favor of Solana Beach instead. Today, the former station and its platform are still kept intact next to the active railroad, and it is often leased out for weddings or other special events.
