= Coaster (rail service) =

Commuter rail service in San Diego County, California

COASTER

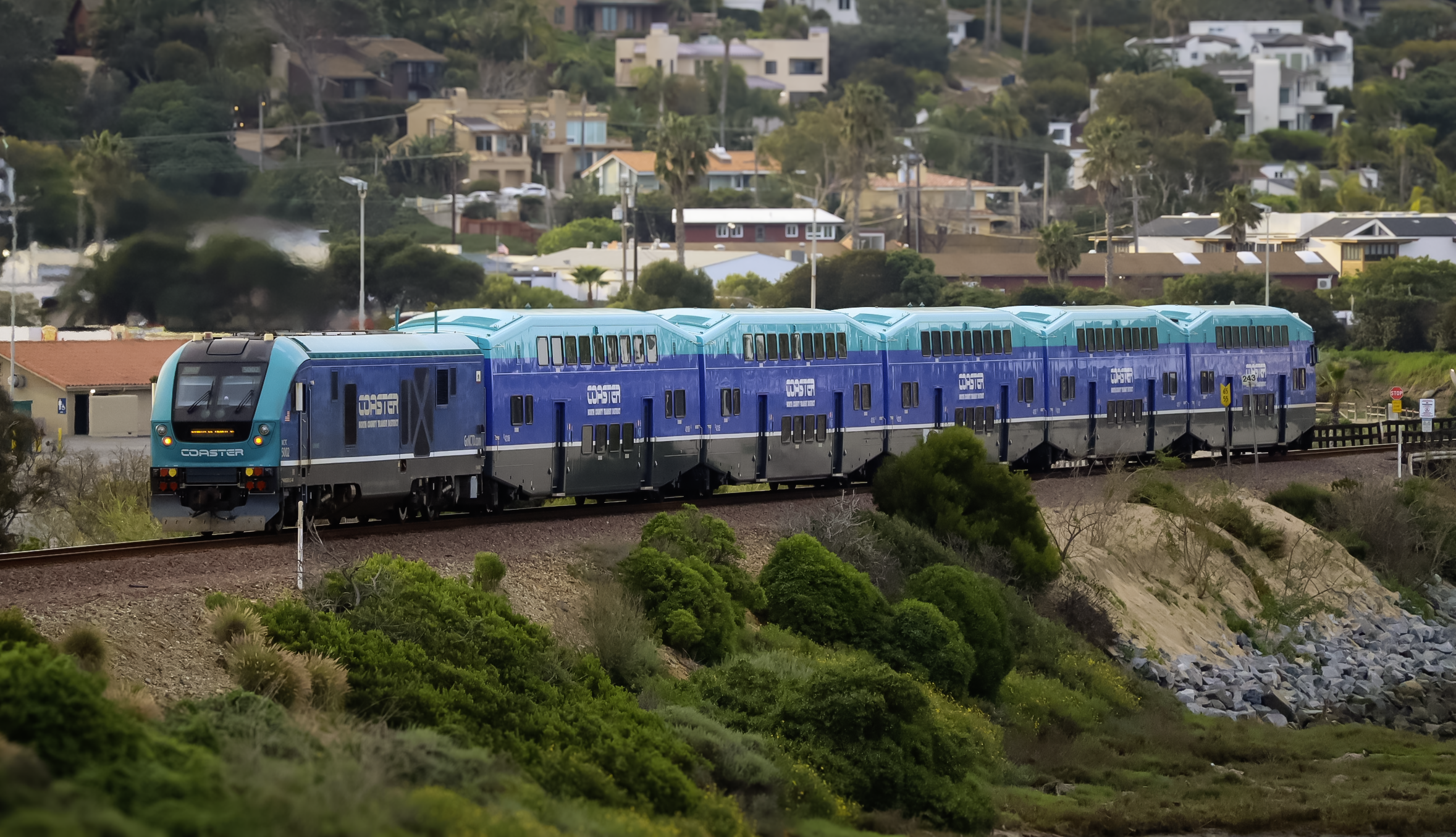
- A Coaster train in Del Mar in 2026

Overview
- Service type: Commuter rail
- Locale: San Diego County, California, United States
- First service: February 27, 1995
- Current operator: North County Transit District
- Former operators: Amtrak (1995–2005); TransitAmerica (2006–2016); Bombardier Transportation (2016–2021); Alstom (2021–2022)
- Ridership: 3,500 (weekdays, Q2 2026)
- Annual ridership: 993,300 (2025)
- Website: gonctd.com/coaster

Route
- Termini: Oceanside; San Diego
- Stops: 8
- Distance travelled: 41 mi (66 km)
- Average journey time: 1 hour, 1 minute
- Train number: 630-699
- Line used: Surf Line

Technical
- Rolling stock: 9 locomotives, 28 coaches
- Track gauge: 4 ft 8 1/2 in (1,435 mm) standard gauge
- Operating speed: 90 mph (140 km/h) (top); 40 mph (64 km/h) (average)
- Track owners: San Diego Association of Governments and North County Transit District
- Timetable number: 398 (internal documents only)
Route map
COASTER highlighted in teal

Coaster (stylized in all caps; reporting marks NCTC, SDNX) is a commuter rail service in the central and northern coastal regions of San Diego County, California, United States, operated by the North County Transit District (NCTD). The 41-mile (66 km) commuter rail line has eight stops, with a travel time of about one hour end-to-end. The service operates seven days a week except nights, with slightly greater frequency during weekday peak periods.

Coaster first entered service on February 27, 1995, and has since grown in ridership and capacity. In 2025, the line had a ridership of 993,300, or about 3,500 per weekday as of the second quarter of 2026.

== History ==
The North San Diego County Transit Development Board was created in 1975 to consolidate and improve transit in northern San Diego County. Planning began for a San Diego–Oceanside commuter rail line, then called Coast Express Rail, in 1982. Funding for right-of-way acquisition and construction costs came from TransNet, a 1987 measure that imposed a 0.5% sales tax on San Diego County residents for transportation projects. The Board established the San Diego Northern Railway Corporation (SDNR) – a nonprofit operating subsidiary – in 1994. SDNR purchased the 41 miles (66 km) of the Surf Line within San Diego County plus the 22-mile (35 km) Escondido Subdivision (later used for the SPRINTER) from the Santa Fe Railway that year.

Coaster service began on February 27, 1995. NCTD originally contracted Amtrak to provide personnel for Coaster trains. In July 2006, TransitAmerica Services took over the day-to-day operation of the commuter train, based on a five-year, $45 million contract with NCTD. In 2016, Bombardier Transportation replaced TransitAmerica as Coaster's operator. In December 2018, NCTD achieved full implementation of positive train control along the entire Coaster route, making it one of only four railroads in the United States to achieve full implementation of this technology without needing an extension beyond 2018. In 2022, NCTD transitioned operations and maintenance to agency staff; maintenance of way remained contracted out.

=== Future ===
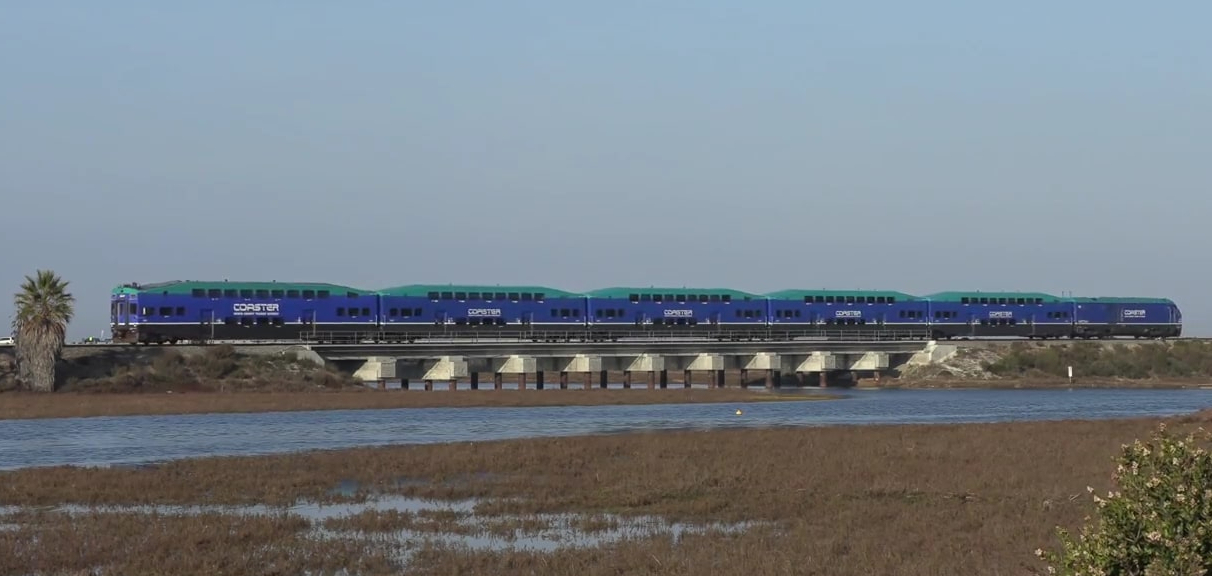
A Coaster train passes over a new concrete bridge (as part of a bridge replacement project) near Torrey Pines State Natural Reserve.

San Diego County voters extended the TransNet sales tax through 2038, which includes funding for rail track upgrades. By the early 2010s, numerous improvements such as added double track and bridge replacements were in various stages of construction and design. As part of the broader North Coast Corridor project, approximately $1 billion is planned to be spent on new segments of double track between San Diego and Orange County.

Limited-use stations at the San Diego Convention Center and the Del Mar Racetrack for use during major events have been planned. Construction on the downtown station at the Convention Center, known as the Downtown Platform, is planned to break ground in spring 2026 and be completed in 2027.

A northward extension to Camp Pendleton was also proposed in 2011. As of 2025, the NCTD's long-term plans include constructing a Camp Pendleton station, though no negotiations with the Camp Pendleton command have begun.

In the early 2020s, officials recognized the need to move the tracks away from the encroaching erosion of the Del Mar bluffs. Planning and design of a rail tunnel under the city are ongoing, with an estimated completion date of 2035. By 2024, SANDAG narrowed down the Del Mar bluffs bypass to three routes. One of the routes would tunnel under the Del Mar Fairgrounds, which was opposed by the local community.

== Service ==
More than 20 Coaster trains run on weekdays, with additional service on the weekends. As of April 3, 2017, Coaster also added Friday Night service with trains running until a quarter after midnight. More weekend services operate during summer months and when there are special events, such as home games for the San Diego Padres. In March 2020, all weekend trains and some weekday trains were suspended due to the coronavirus pandemic; however, weekend service was reinstated on May 29, 2021.

=== Stations ===
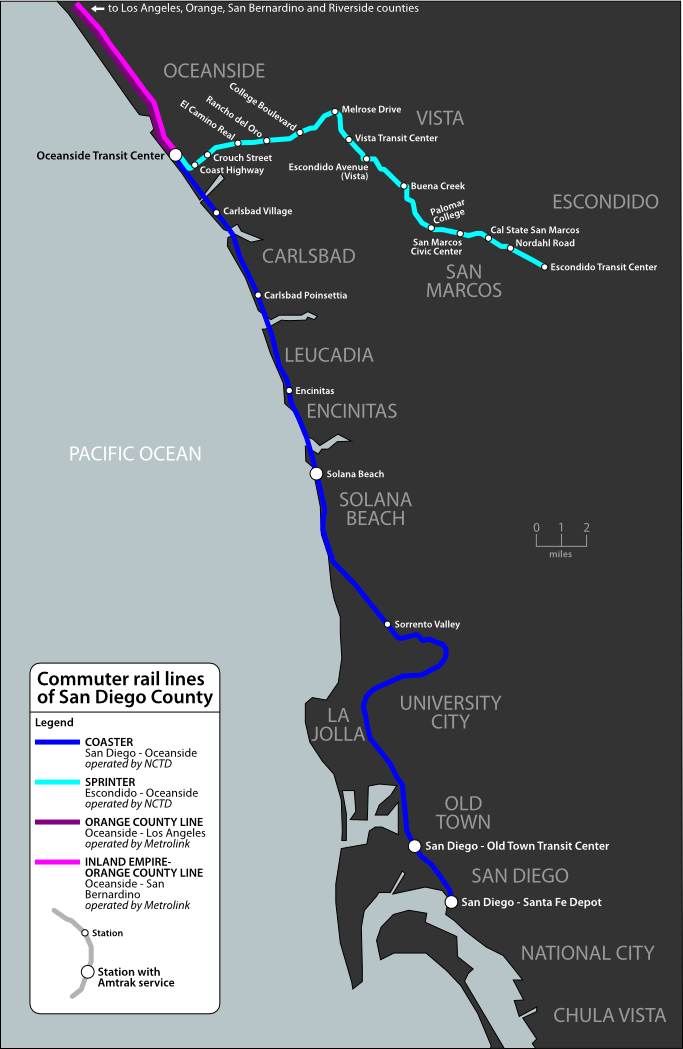
Coaster route map (with other commuter lines included). This does not show routes of the San Diego Trolley.

Zone	Location	Station	Connections
1	Oceanside	Oceanside Transit Center	Amtrak: Pacific Surfliner, Thruway 1 SPRINTER; Metrolink: ■ Orange County Line, ■ Inland Empire–Orange County Line; BREEZE: 101, 302, 303, 313, 318, FLEX 392, FLEX 395; Greyhound Lines
1	Carlsbad	Carlsbad Village	BREEZE: 101, 315, 325
1	Carlsbad	Carlsbad Poinsettia	BREEZE: 445
1	Encinitas	Encinitas	BREEZE: 101, 304, 309
1	Solana Beach	Solana Beach	Amtrak: Pacific Surfliner; BREEZE: 101, 308
Planned	Del Mar	Del Mar Fairgrounds	
2	San Diego	Sorrento Valley	NCTD COASTER Connection: 473, 479
3	San Diego	Old Town Transit Center	Amtrak: Pacific Surfliner; San Diego Trolley: Green Line, Blue Line; MTS: 8, 9, 10, 28, 30, 35, 44, 84X, 88, 105, 150
3	San Diego	Santa Fe Depot	Amtrak: Pacific Surfliner; San Diego Trolley: Green Line, Blue Line; MTS: 83, Rapid 215, Rapid 225, Rapid 235, Rapid Express 280, Rapid Express 290, 923, 992
Planned	San Diego	Downtown San Diego	San Diego Trolley: Green Line

=== Fares and ticketing ===
The cost of Coaster tickets is based upon the number of zones traveled (see map). Fare collection is based on a proof-of-payment system: tickets must be purchased before boarding and are checked by roving fare inspectors. Monthly passes are available. All tickets and passes include transfer agreements with BREEZE buses and monthly passes include transfer with the Metropolitan Transit System (MTS) buses and Trolleys. On January 20, 2011, NCTD implemented a fare reduction, which to increased ridership on Coaster and so was made permanent in September 2011.

Starting October 1, 2026, the fares will be increased to help support the rising operation and maintenance costs. The one-way adult fare has changed from ranging from $5 to $6.5, depending on distance to $6.5 flat rate. They have also planned to increase the fare again on October 1, 2027.

With proof of eligibility, senior citizens (ages 60 and over), people with disabilities, and Medicare cardholders receive a 50% discount on the above fares.

Riding Coaster without a valid ticket may result in a penalty fare of up to $250. Riders cannot purchase tickets on board the train.

==== Pronto Fare System / Former Compass System ====
Coaster, along with all other NCTD and MTS services, utilizes the new Pronto contactless fare system introduced in September 2021 by INIT Systems and SANDAG; the Pronto system succeeded the first-generation Compass Card system. As a replacement for the original "Compass Card," the Pronto fare system allows for a tap-on, tap-off approach, so riders on Coaster can tap-on when entering the station platform (using one of the station's validators), and tap-off when arriving at the destination stop, in order to deduct the correct fare. However, unlike other NCTD and MTS services, Pronto users for Coaster are required to purchase Day or Monthly Passes prior to riding due to different electronic ticket requirements. These passes along with general Pronto cards can be physically purchased at Pronto ticket vending machines at NCTD facilities, or in customer service centers; electronic versions can be purchased through the website or through the mobile applications.

Coaster previously utilized the aforementioned contactless "Compass Card", made possible by Cubic Transportation Systems, Inc. The "Compass Card" allowed passengers from MTS and NCTD to store regional transit passes and cash value on a rewritable RFID card. Customers would have purchased passes and added cash value on the Internet or at any ticket vending machine. Prior to boarding a train, customers tapped their Compass Cards on the ticket validator located on the train platform. The LED display on the validator would then light up with lights resembling that of a stoplight, and the LCD showed text regarding the passenger's fare account. The new Pronto system now used expanded upon many of the design concepts previously employed with the Compass Card system.

=== Ridership ===
Coaster carried about 514,450 passengers during its first year of operation, and ridership rose steadily in the years that followed. In 2019, Coaster ridership was approximately 1.4 million people, with an average number of 4,200 weekday boardings. The Coaster served 993,300 riders in 2025, and currently carries 3,500 per weekday as of the second quarter of 2026.

== Rolling stock ==
Builder	Type	Purchased	Quantity	Numbers	Image
Active Locomotives
Siemens	SC-44 Charger	2018–2020	9	5001–5009	
Active Passenger cars
Bombardier	BiLevel coach	1994	3	2201, 2203, 2208	
Bombardier	BiLevel coach	1997	6	2401–2406	
Bombardier	BiLevel coach	2003	4	2501–2504	
Bombardier	BiLevel coach	2020	8	42101–42108	
Bombardier	BiLevel cab car	1994	8	2302–2308	
Bombardier	BiLevel cab car	2003	2	2309–2310	
Bombardier	BiLevel cab car	2020	3	421-423	

Builder	Type	Purchased	Retired	Quantity	Numbers	Image
Retired Locomotives
EMD	F40PHM-2C	1994	2021	5	2101-2105	
EMD	F59PHI	2001	2023	2	3001-3002	
Retired Passenger cars
Bombardier	BiLevel coach	1994	2023	3	2202, 2204-2207	
Bombardier	BiLevel cab car	1994	2026	1	2301	

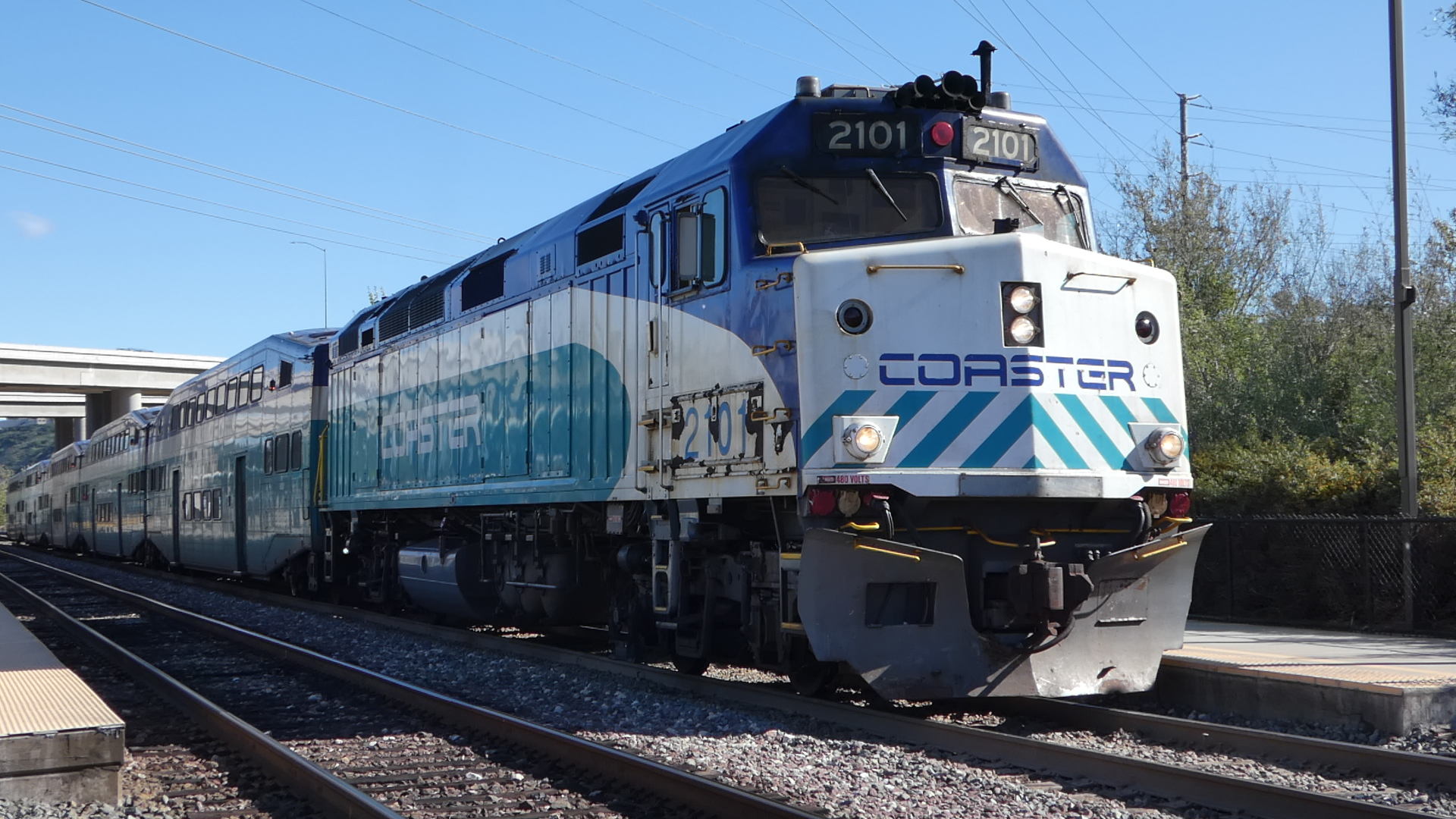
Coaster 2101, an F40PHM-2C, at Sorrento Valley Station shortly before it was retired.

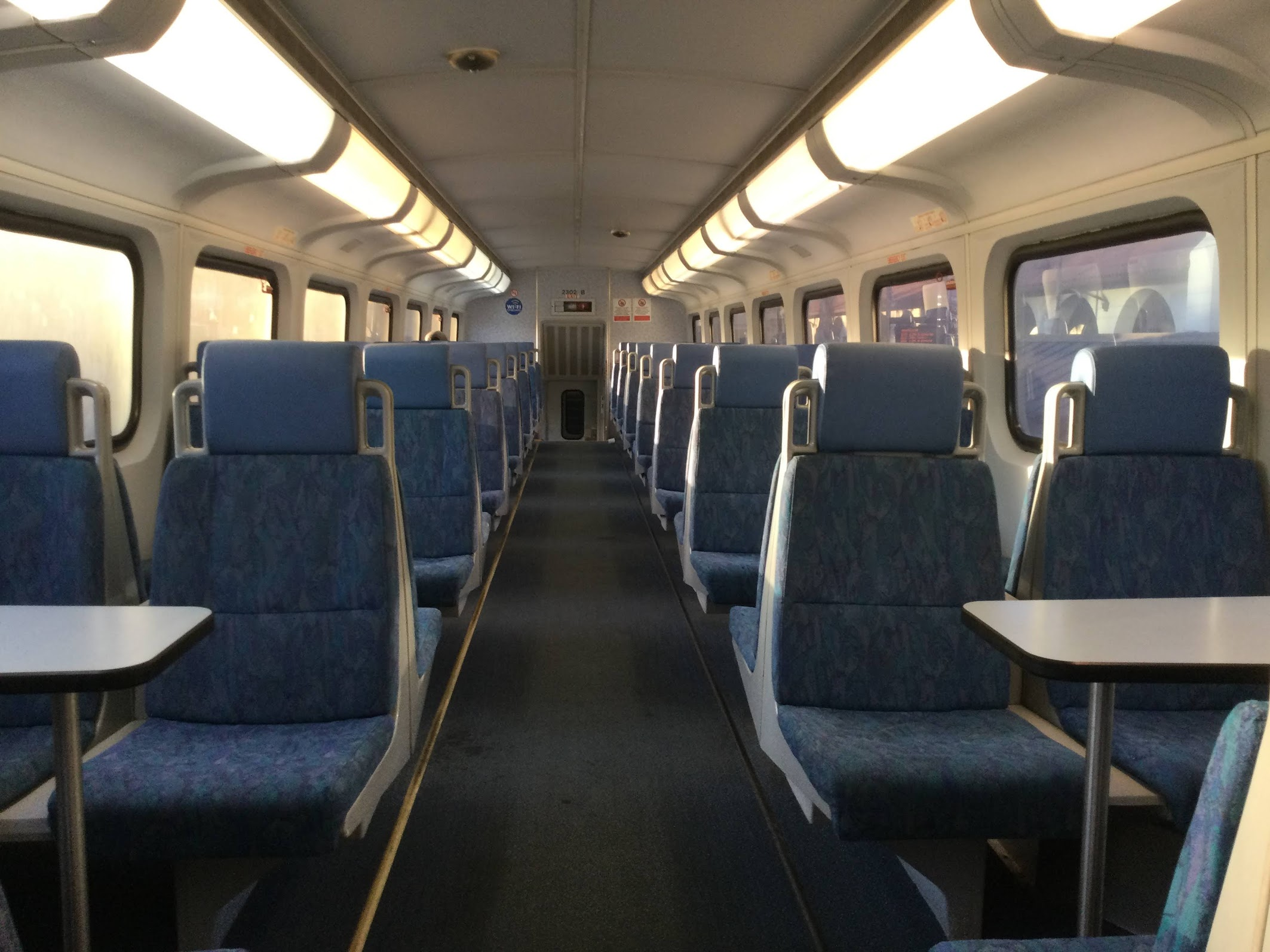
The top deck of an original Coaster Bombardier Bi-Level coach. The seat materials will be refurbished, with electrical outlets also to be added.

In June 2018, the North County Transit District (NCTD) Board approved the purchase of five Siemens SC-44 Charger locomotives to replace their existing five F40PHM-2C locomotives that were remanufactured by Morrison-Knudsen, with $10.5 million of the estimated $53.9 million cost earmarked from statewide gas tax and vehicle registration fees. In June 2019, the NCTD Board approved the purchase of two additional SC-44 locomotives to replace two EMD F59PHI locomotives; they are due for delivery in late 2022. In September 2020, the NCTD Board approved the purchase of two more SC-44 Chargers, for a total of nine; planned for delivery in April 2023, they will be used to expand service. Deliveries of the first five Siemens SC-44 Charger locomotives took place from August–October 2020; they began revenue service on February 8, 2021, the same day Coaster retired their five F40PHM-2C locomotives. Two locomotives were donated; 2103 to the Pacific Southwest Railway Museum, and 2105 to the Southern California Railway Museum.

In January 2020, Bombardier began to overhaul the legacy BiLevel equipment at a minimum rate of four cars per year; all 28 cars are planned to be overhauled and repainted into the new livery by 2026. The coach overhaul improvements include upgraded door systems, installation of LED light fixtures, seat cushion replacements, installation of electrical charging outlets, and suspension maintenance improvements.

In July 2020, the NCTD Board approved the purchase of eleven new Bombardier BiLevel passenger cars (consisting of eight coaches and three crash-energy management cab-cars) that will be used to add two trainsets to regular service and support SANDAG expansion upon delivery in late 2022. The base order also includes options for 27 additional cars, but such options have not currently been exercised.

In August 2018, NCTD announced that they were seeking public opinions and input on a re-brand of the agency, and ran online polls for the public to vote on a new livery for Coaster equipment. The new livery, chosen by Siemens in late 2019, is being applied to the overhauled coaches and to new equipment.

In June 2023, the NCTD board voted to sell five older bilevel cars to the Utah Transit Authority, and to sell two Charger locomotives (possibly to Caltrans or Metrolink). The funds will be used for operations or capital projects, including planned conversion to zero-emissions equipment.

=== Yards ===
NCTD maintains and utilizes two rail yards for Coaster. The main maintenance and storage yard, located at Stuart Mesa on Camp Pendleton, just north of the Oceanside Transit Center. This is where trains are serviced, maintained and stored for the night. From the service's inception in 1995 until 2020, NCTD used Tracks 25, 26 and 27 of the MTS 12th and Imperial yard to store trains during midday.
