= Encinitas station =

Railway station in Encinitas, California, United States

Encinitas
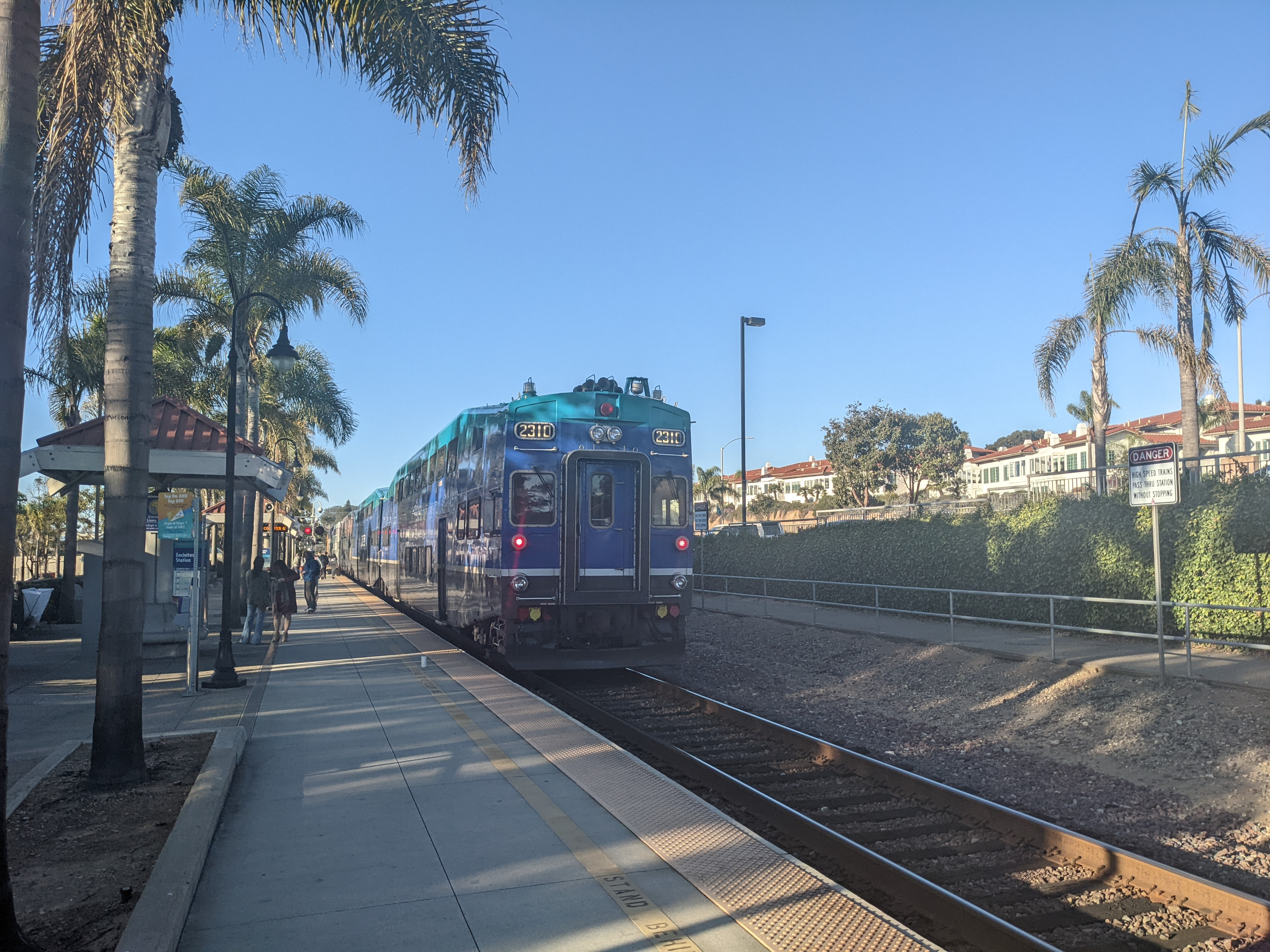
- A Coaster train at Encinitas station in February 2022

General information
- Location: 25 East D Street; Encinitas, California
- Coordinates: 33°2′49.56″N 117°17′35.46″W
- Owner: North County Transit District
- Line: NCTD San Diego Subdivision
- Platforms: 1 side platform
- Tracks: 1
- Connections: NCTD BREEZE: 101, 304, 309, 604, 609

Construction
- Parking: Yes
- Cycle facilities: Yes
- Accessible: Yes

Other information
- Fare zone: 1

History
- Opened: February 27, 1995

Services
Preceding station	North County Transit District	Following station
Carlsbad Poinsettia toward Oceanside	COASTER	Solana Beach toward Santa Fe Depot
Former services
Preceding station	Amtrak	Following station
Carlsbad Poinsettia toward San Luis Obispo	Pacific Surfliner 2013–2017	Solana Beach toward San Diego
At former Encinitas station (until the 1960s)
Preceding station	Atchison, Topeka and Santa Fe Railway	Following station
Oceanside toward Los Angeles	Surf Line	Del Mar toward San Diego
Carlsbad 1887-1960 toward Los Angeles	Surf Line	Cardiff pre-1950s toward San Diego
Location

Encinitas station is a train station in Encinitas, California. It is served by the Coaster commuter rail line and NCTD BREEZE bus routes.

== History ==
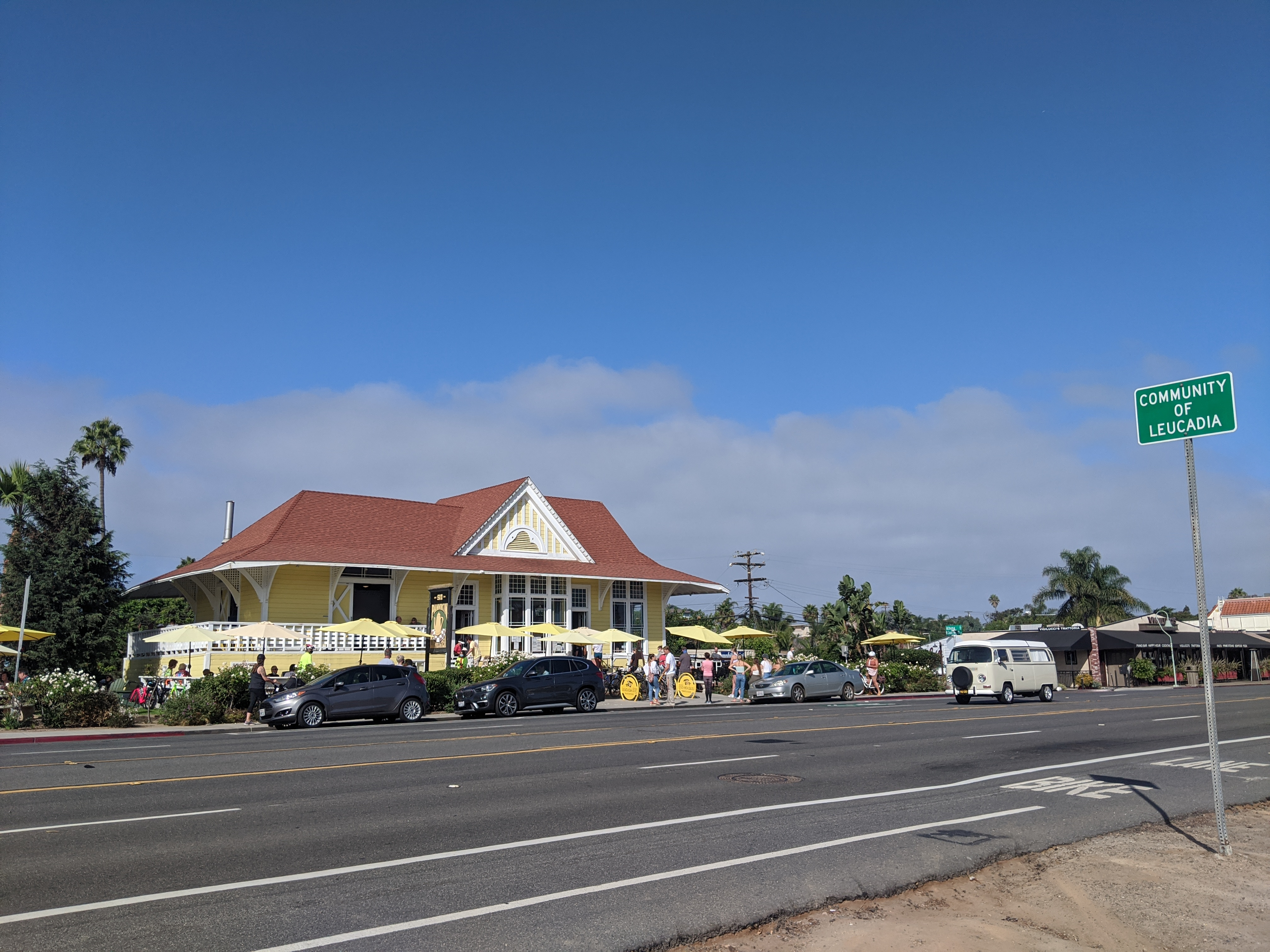
Original Encinitas depot

The original Encinitas depot, built in 1887 by the California Southern Railroad (which later became part of the Atchison, Topeka and Santa Fe Railway) still stands. It has been moved from its original location to 510 North Coast Highway, and is now in use as a coffee shop.

On October 7, 2013, the Amtrak Pacific Surfliner began stopping at four Coaster stations including Encinitas. Amtrak dropped service at Carlsbad Poinsettia and Encinitas on October 9, 2017, due to low ridership.
