= Santa Fe Depot (San Diego) =

Main railroad station for San Diego

Santa Fe Depot San Diego, CA
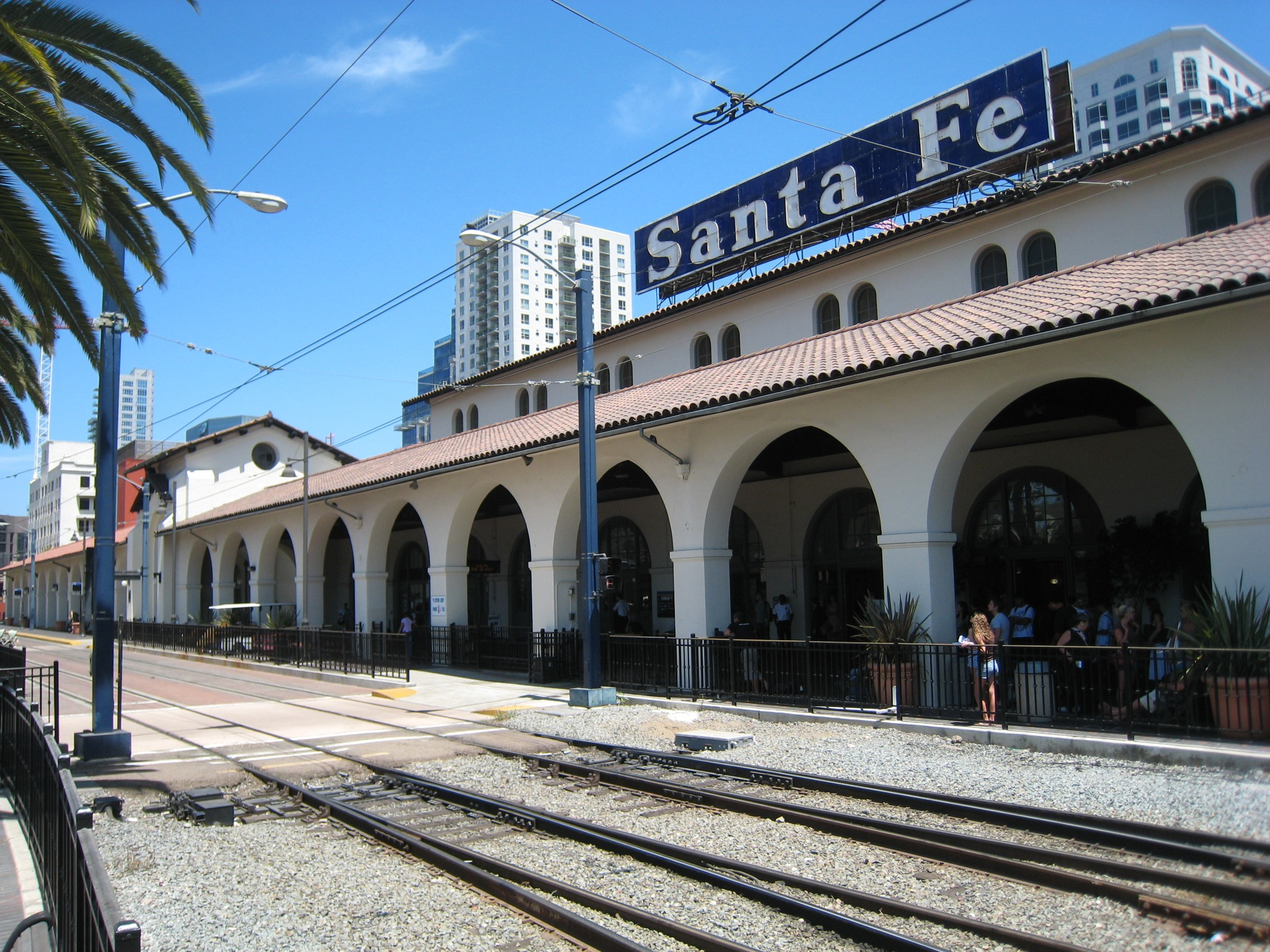
- The station building as seen from the platforms in August 2007

General information
- Other names: Union Station
- Location: 1050 Kettner Boulevard; San Diego, California; United States
- Coordinates: 32°43′00″N 117°10′10″W
- Owner: Santa Fe Depot LLC (building); North County Transit District (tracks)
- Operator: Amtrak California
- Line: NCTD San Diego Subdivision
- Platforms: 2 island platforms 2 side platforms
- Tracks: 6
- Connections: MTS: 83, Rapid 215, Rapid 225, Rapid 235, Rapid Express 280, Rapid Express 290, 910 (Overnight Express), 923, 992; Amtrak Thruway: 1

Construction
- Structure type: At-grade
- Parking: Paid parking nearby
- Cycle facilities: 12 rack spaces, 3 lockers
- Accessible: Yes

Other information
- Status: Staffed, station building with waiting room
- Station code: Amtrak: SAN; MTS: 75082, 75083
- Fare zone: 3 (Coaster)

History
- Opened: March 7, 1915; 111 years ago
- Rebuilt: 2012
- Original company: Atchison, Topeka and Santa Fe Railway

Passengers
- FY 2025: 489,962 (Amtrak)

Services
Preceding station	Amtrak	Following station
San Diego–Old Town toward San Luis Obispo	Pacific Surfliner	Terminus
Preceding station	North County Transit District	Following station
Old Town toward Oceanside	COASTER	Terminus
Preceding station	San Diego Trolley	Following station
County Center/Little Italy toward UTC	Blue Line	America Plaza toward San Ysidro
County Center/Little Italy toward UTC	Blue Line One weekday southbound trip	through to 12th & Imperial via Green Line trackage
County Center/Little Italy toward El Cajon	Green Line	Seaport Village toward 12th & Imperial
County Center/Little Italy toward Balboa Avenue	Special Event Line	Seaport Village toward 12th & Imperial
Preceding station	Rapid	Following station
Terminus	Rapid 215	Courthouses toward SDSU
Terminus	Rapid 225	Courthouses toward Otay Mesa
Terminus	Rapid 235	Courthouses toward Escondido
Former services
Preceding station	San Diego Trolley	Following station
Terminus	Orange Line 2012-2017	America Plaza toward El Cajon
County Center/Little Italy toward Qualcomm Stadium	Special Event Line pre-2012	Seaport Village toward 12th & Imperial
Preceding station	Atchison, Topeka and Santa Fe Railway	Following station
Del Mar toward Los Angeles	Surf Line	Terminus
Linda Vista To 1950s toward Los Angeles	Surf Line	San Diego 22nd Street To 1926 toward National City
Preceding station	Southern Pacific Railroad	Following station
Terminus	San Diego and Arizona Eastern Railway Main Line	San Ysidro toward El Centro
Future services
Preceding station	North County Transit District	Following station
Old Town toward Oceanside	COASTER	Downtown San Diego Terminus
- Santa Fe Depot
- U.S. National Register of Historic Places
- San Diego Historic Landmark
- Area: 4.6 acres (1.9 ha)
- Built: 1915
- Architect: Bakewell and Brown
- Architectural style: Mission/Spanish Revival
- NRHP reference No.: 72000248
- SDHL No.: 56

Significant dates
- Added to NRHP: June 26, 1972
- Designated SDHL: February 4, 1972
Track layout
Key
Location

Santa Fe Depot is a union station in San Diego, California, built by the Atchison, Topeka and Santa Fe Railway to replace the small Victorian-style structure erected in 1887 for the California Southern Railroad Company. The Spanish Colonial Revival style station is listed on the National Register of Historic Places and is a San Diego Historic Landmark. Its architecture, particularly the signature twin domes, is often echoed in the design of modern buildings in downtown San Diego.

The historic depot is located in the Core district of downtown San Diego and is still an active transportation center, providing services to Amtrak California intercity trains, Coaster commuter rail trains, the San Diego Trolley, and the San Diego Metropolitan Transit System bus system.

Santa Fe Depot (as it was originally designated) officially opened on March 8, 1915, to accommodate visitors to the Panama–California Exposition. The depot was completed during a particularly optimistic period in the city's development and represents the battle waged by the City of San Diego to become the West Coast terminus of the Santa Fe's transcontinental railroad, a fight that was ultimately lost to the City of Los Angeles.

In its heyday, the facility not only handled Santa Fe traffic but also that of the San Diego and Arizona Railway (SD&A) and San Diego Electric Railway (SDERy). The designation was officially changed to "San Diego Union Station" in response to the SD&A's completion of its own transcontinental line in December 1919. Santa Fe resumed solo operation of the station in January 1951 when the San Diego and Arizona Eastern Railway (successor to the SD&A) discontinued passenger service, the SDERy having ceased operation some two years prior.

Of the 77 California stations served by Amtrak in fiscal year 2017, the Santa Fe Depot was the third busiest in the state (behind only Los Angeles Union Station and Sacramento Valley Station) and the 10th busiest in the Amtrak system, boarding or detraining an average of approximately 2,130 passengers daily.

== History ==
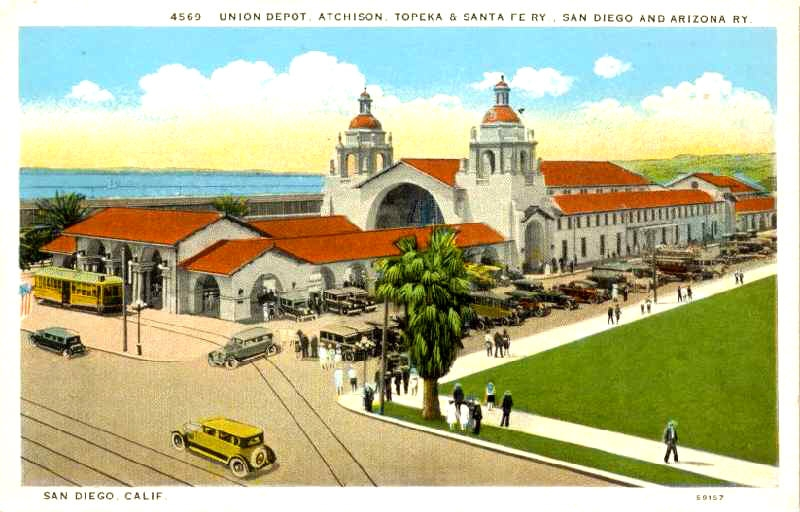
This postcard was issued in 1920 to commemorate the completion of the SD&A's connection to downtown. A portion of the SDERy's streetcar loop is depicted at left.

=== Background ===
On June 20, 1879, the Santa Fe Railway received a land grant from the Mexican government that allowed them to extend their reach through the valley of Sonora through to the coastal town of Guaymas on the Gulf of California. The Sonora Railway (an operating subsidiary) allowed the Santa Fe to effectively compete with the Southern Pacific Railroad for business on the West Coast of the United States. Traffic on the line, however, was light, and Santa Fe pushed further westward in search of a suitable Pacific terminus. Since 1845, the citizens of San Diego (then essentially a sleepy fishing village) had attempted to establish a direct rail link to the east without success. The Texas and Pacific Railway Company (known as the T&P) was created by federal charter in 1871 with the purpose of building a southern transcontinental railroad between Marshall, Texas, and San Diego. The T&P had a significant foothold in Texas by the mid-1880s but construction difficulties delayed westward progress until American financier Jay Gould acquired an interest in the railroad in 1879. The T&P never reached San Diego but instead met the Southern Pacific at Sierra Blanca, Texas, in 1881.

In the wake of this setback, the Santa Fe was approached by the Citizens Railroad Committee of San Diego, who had formed a syndicate for the purpose of building a rail line to connect with the A&P in eastern California. Santa Fe provided financial assistance to the group, which also founded the California Southern Railroad Company (CSRR) on October 23, 1880. A roundhouse, workshops, and classification yards were built in National City, a suburb of San Diego. A wharf was also constructed to accommodate ship traffic. Initial plans were made to construct 18 miles (29 km) of main line track extending north from the new complex. As of January 12, 1882, the California Southern commenced regular passenger and freight service between its National City terminus and Fallbrook Junction, just north of Oceanside.

Tracklaying continued and proceeded steadily northward until August 14, 1882, when a connection was made with the Southern Pacific's line in Colton. The California Southern's attempts to cross over the SP tracks a year later led to a frog war that ended on August 11, 1883, with a court order in the CSRR's favor. A track extension to San Bernardino was completed and the first regular passenger train arrived on September 13. The line became part of the Atchison, Topeka and Santa Fe Railroad's transcontinental rail line in 1885 via an extension of the California Southern from Colton north over the Cajon Pass to Barstow. Santa Fe completed the "Surf Line" run between Los Angeles and San Diego under the auspices of its subsidiary, the Southern California Railway (a different subsidiary from the California Southern), on August 12, 1888. The route was initially referred to as the Los Angeles—San Diego "Short Line" as it replaced the circuitous inland route through Temecula Canyon.

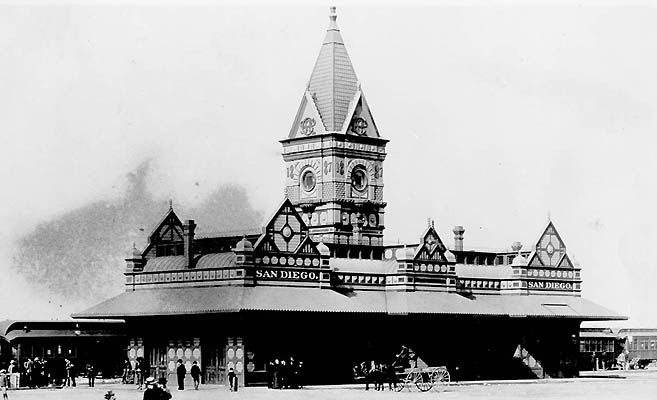
California Southern's San Diego passenger terminal as it appeared toward the end of the 19th century. An early predecessor of the San Diegan is waiting to depart.

A real estate boom in the spring of 1887 brought thousands of people to Southern California, many of them traveling on "The Santa Fé Route" to San Diego. The California Southern constructed a new Victorian-style depot to handle the throngs of people coming to the Southland. The structure sported dark red paint with dark green trim. Recurring washouts in Temecula Canyon, however, often disrupted service; in response, the Santa Fe began construction of its 126-mile (203 km)-long "Surf Line" between Los Angeles' La Grande Station and the National City depot. From 1886 to 1888, the Riverside, Santa Ana and Los Angeles Railway built a branch line from Highgrove southwest via Riverside, to Santa Ana and from Orange northwest to Los Angeles. Also in 1888, the San Bernardino and San Diego Railway completed its line from Oceanside north to Santa Ana, completing what was originally called the "Los Angeles-San Diego Short Line." The inland route was finally abandoned in 1891, leaving the newer, coastal route as the only line to San Diego from the north.

It was generally felt that with the completion of the Panama Canal in 1914, San Diego would logically become the principal port of call for the Atlantic-Pacific sea trade. To that end, the City decided to stage an international exposition in celebration of the opening of the Canal, and to tout San Diego as the first U.S. port for ships traveling north after passing through the facility. But San Diego, even with its natural landlocked harbor, was 100 miles (161 km) farther south than Los Angeles, which translated into an additional day of travel for both freight and passenger trains; in order for Santa Fe to compete with the Southern Pacific Railroad, the company needed a port closer to its rival's transcontinental terminus. Santa Fe transferred most of its engine terminal yard to San Bernardino in 1887, then established an interim port facility in Redondo Beach the following year. But when the railroad relocated its port operations to San Pedro's newly dredged, manmade harbor in 1911, it effectively ended San Diego's hopes to become the West Coast's southernmost commercial port.

=== Santa Fe Depot ===
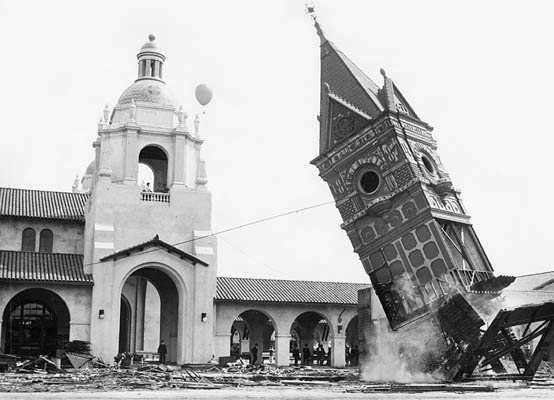
The clock tower of the original Santa Fe depot at Bay and Broadway is pulled to the ground by a steel cable attached to two yard locomotives as part of the grand opening celebration on March 7.

Though the elegant California Southern depot had served San Diego for nearly three decades, the station was not adequate to handle the expected flood of visitors through the "Silver Gate" in 1915. In fact, the Santa Fe had considered replacing the aging "D" Street station with a larger, more modern edifice. Plans were drawn up for a new station complex in the Mission Revival Style, befitting the upcoming Exposition. The large, graceful palm trees that graced the old depot were boxed and stored for re-planting alongside the new building. Construction began on a site just east of the existing structure on January 15, 1914, and was completed on December 31, at a total cost of $300,000 (equivalent to $9.64 million in 2025 adjusted for inflation). A Fred Harvey Company lunch counter and dining room were incorporated into the floor plan. The old wooden structure was razed during the few days before the opening; the clock tower was ceremonially toppled on March 7, 1915.

The facility opened for business on March 8. Oliver J. Stough, the last surviving veteran of the Mexican–American War, was given the honor of purchasing the first ticket. At the outset, the Santa Fe had three daily local trains and one express train running between Los Angeles and San Diego. During the exposition nine scheduled trains ran on during the week (eight only made stops at Fullerton and Santa Ana, while the ninth was a local that stopped at all of the "Surf Line" stations). Twelve trains operated on weekends, many running in multiple sections. Four helper locomotives were assigned to the Sorrento Grade to help trains over the hill for the duration of the Exposition.

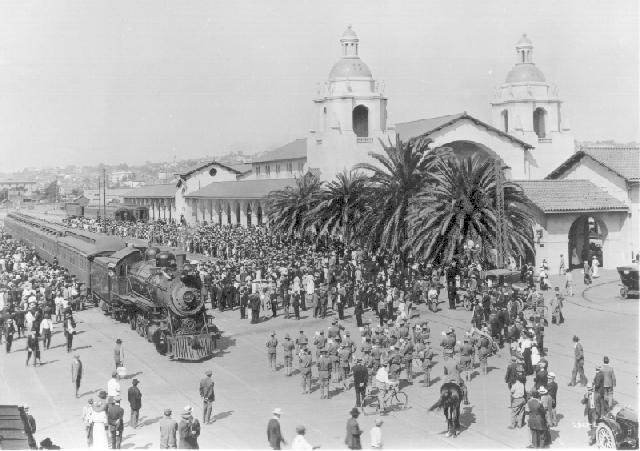
The first SD&A through passenger train "arrives" in San Diego on December 1, 1919, to officially open the line.

John D. Spreckels' San Diego Electric Railway (SDERy) made regular stops at the station since its opening, and continued to do so until April 24, 1949, when San Diego adopted an all-bus transit system. Spreckels' other rail-related concern, the San Diego and Arizona Railway (built in part to provide San Diego with a direct transcontinental rail link to the east by connecting with the Southern Pacific Railroad lines in El Centro) was invited to make use of the facility. The first SD&A passenger train arrived in downtown on December 1, 1919. In 1936 the Santa Fe ordered a six-car trainset from the Budd Company specifically for the initiation of a new, streamlined named train between the Los Angeles Union Passenger Terminal and San Diego. On March 27, 1938, the company inaugurated the San Diegan route, operating on a two-hour-and-30-minute schedule. A second San Diegan consist entered service on June 8, 1941, doubling the schedule to four daily round trips. Freight service consisted of one scheduled overnight train per day, though extras were run as required (sometimes numbering as many as 10–12 per day). The United States' entry into World War II saw a significant increase in rail traffic to and from San Diego, both in the form of troop movements and transport of military vehicles and supplies.

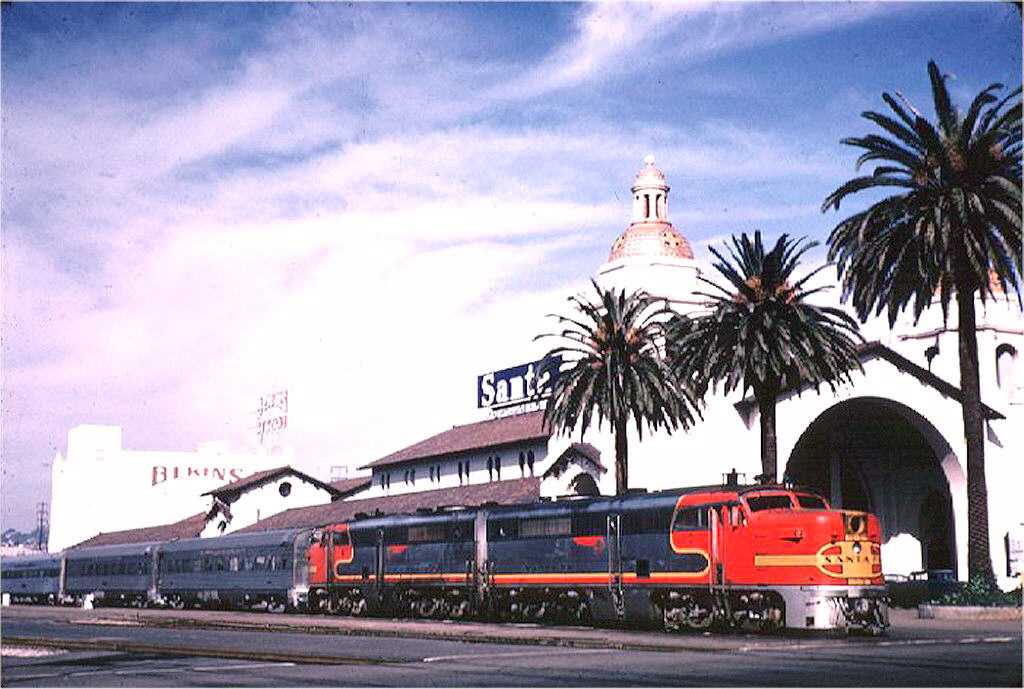
The San Diegan, pulled by a pair of back-to-back ALCO PA units, reaches the end of the line at San Diego's Union Station on October 26, 1963.

While freight shipments dropped precipitously after the War, passenger demand remained high, and traffic on the "Surf Line" ran second only to the Pennsylvania Railroad's New York–Philadelphia corridor. Passenger service on the San Diego and Arizona Eastern Railway (a successor to the SD&A) ended on January 11, 1951, due to years of continued declining patronage. The front portico was removed in September 1954 to allow for the construction of a parking lot.

On May 1, 1971, Amtrak took over operation of the San Diegan line, which operated its route between Santa Fe Depot and Union Station in Los Angeles. Santa Fe trainsets usually ran with no cabcar in the days before Amtrak took over the operation of the San Diegan. To make this work, Santa Fe trains backed up, and turned the trains around at the Washington Street Wye, just about 3 miles north of the station near San Diego International Airport. The wye is no longer in service today, and has been torn up and removed from the site. After more than sixty years of service, the San Diegan was rebranded as the Pacific Surfliner, reflecting extensions of the route over the past two decades to the Central Coast. Since the nearest wye is now 16 miles away in Miramar, Amtrak Pacific Surfliner trains operate in push-pull mode, with an engine at one end and a cabcar at the other end.

In 1972 Santa Fe proposed to demolish the station and replace it with two 12-story buildings. After protests from the Save Our Heritage Organization, the city's Historical Review Board, and Mayor Pete Wilson, Amtrak agreed to preserve the station if the city would redevelop the surrounding neighborhood.

== Architecture ==
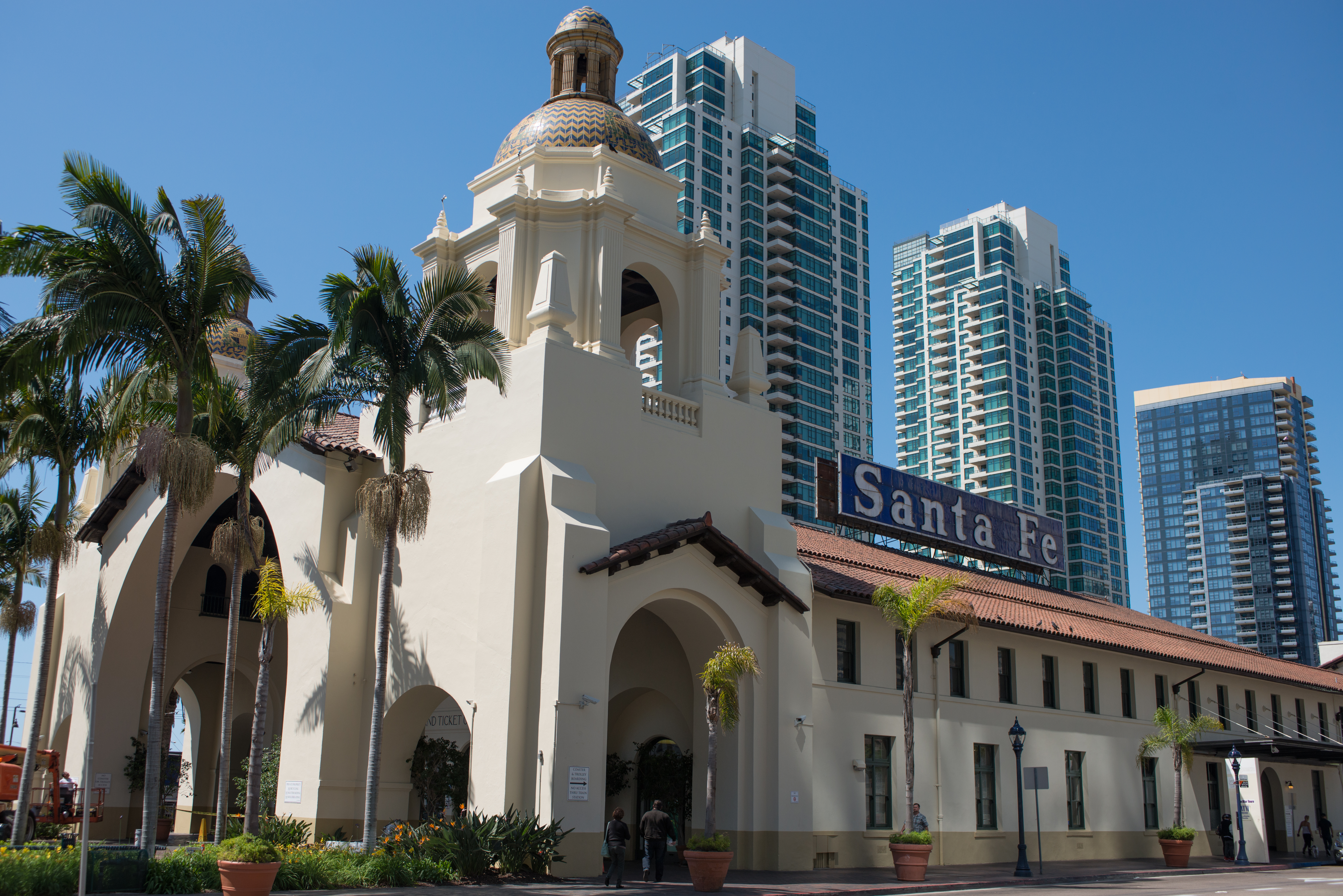
Santa Fe Depot as seen from Broadway

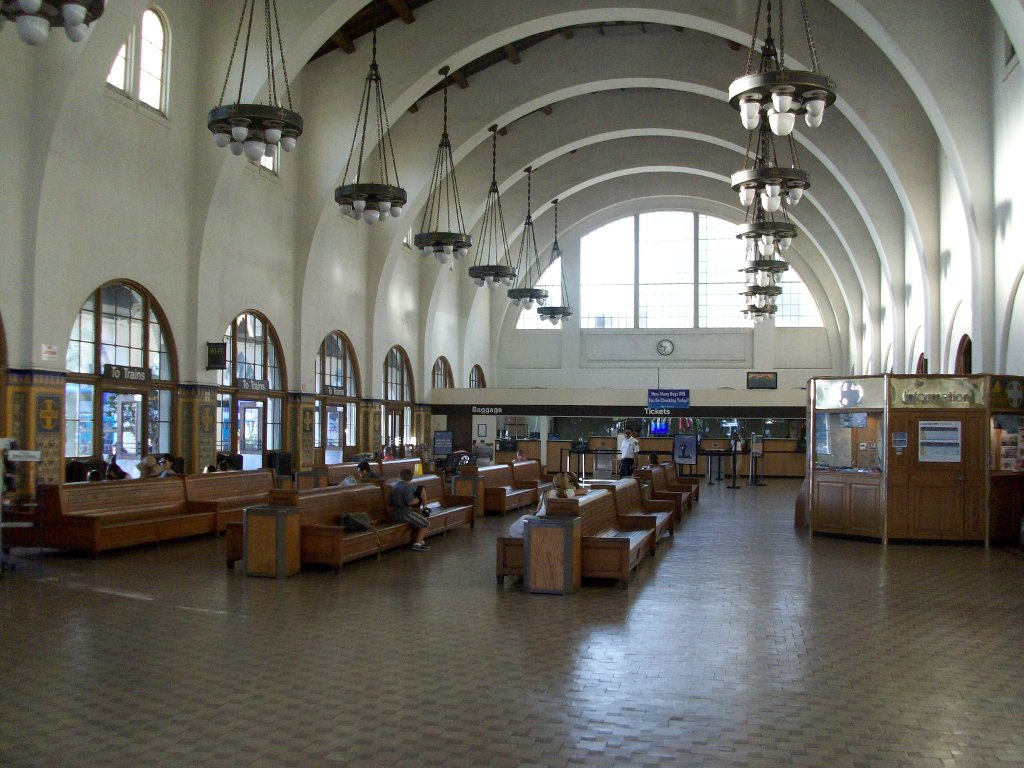
Santa Fe Depot interior

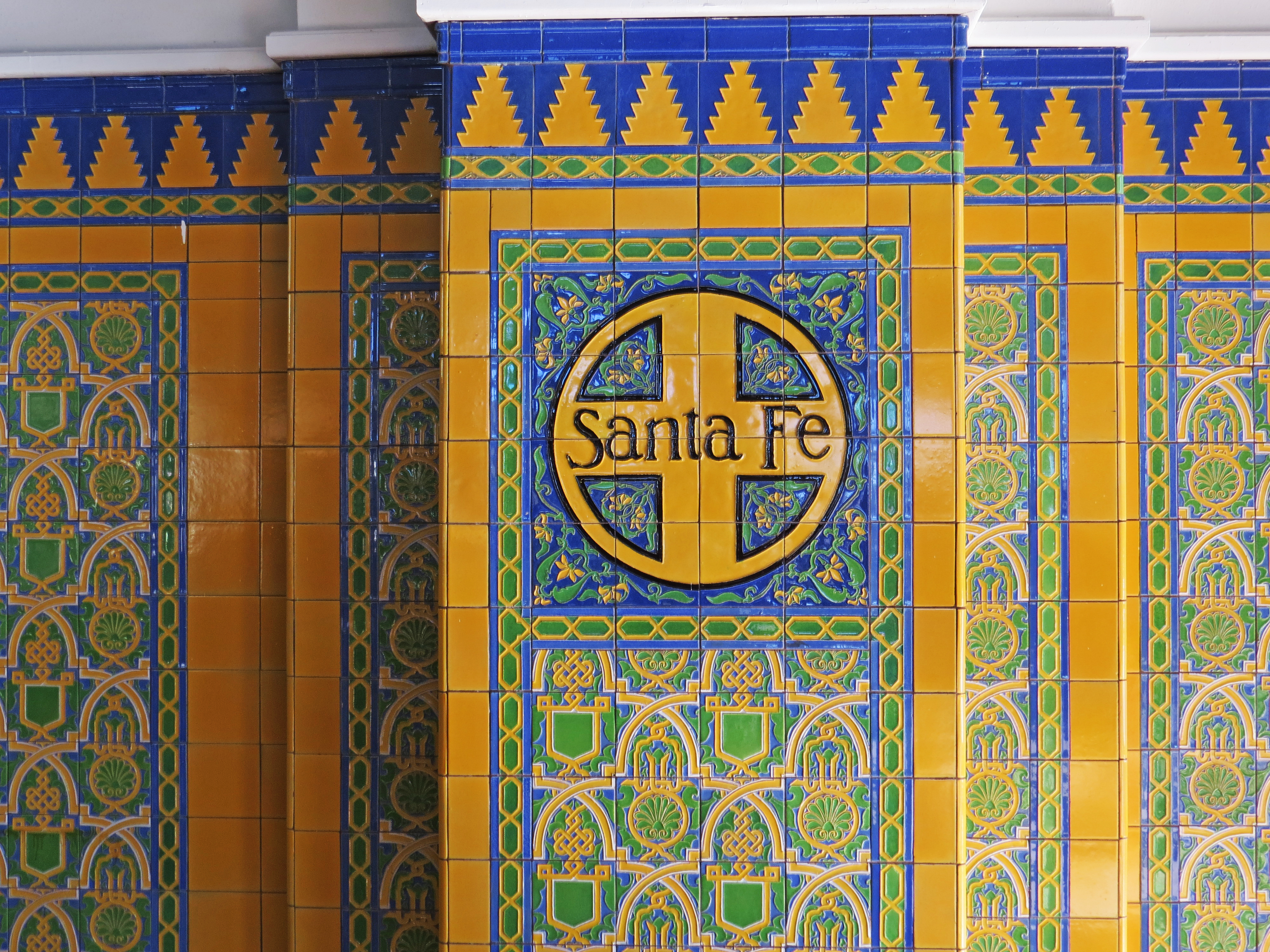
Restored tile work

The complex was designed by San Francisco architects Bakewell and Brown as a "monumental reminder" of California's Spanish heritage. The Mission Revival styling reflects the colonial Spanish history of the state, and was intended to invoke the Spanish Colonial Revival style buildings of the Panama–California Exposition. The size and grandeur far surpassed anything the Santa Fe had ever built in the West. The new edifice featured a covered concourse approximately 650-foot (200 m) long by 106-foot (32 m) wide, with a main waiting room measuring 170-by-55-foot (52 by 17 m). A 27-by-650-foot (8.2 by 198.1 m) long arcade connected the passenger terminal with the baggage and express rooms. The cost of the station was approximately $300,000. An enlarged bus depot was installed in the southeast portico in 1942.

The massive arch of the front entrance is flanked by twin campaniles, each topped by a colorful tile-covered dome and displaying Santa Fe's blue "cross" emblem on all four sides. The structure draws much more heavily from the architecturally distinctive Spanish, Moorish, and Mexican lines exhibited by the Mission San Luís Rey de Francia (located in the town of Oceanside in north San Diego County) than it does from the nearby Mission San Diego de Alcalá, some nine miles (14 km) away. John Bakewell Jr. stated that the station was "decidedly not an archaeological replica of one of the old missions. In its design an honest attempt has been made to build a building that appears to be what it is, a railway station, and yet which has the characteristics of the early California architecture."

The interior space of the depot features natural redwood beam ceilings, with walls covered with a brightly colored ceramic tile wainscot. The glazed faience tile used in the wainscot was manufactured by the California China Products Company of nearby National City, and consists of elaborate Moorish inspired design executed in green, yellow, blue, white, and black. The top edge features a frieze of stylized ziggurats.

== Current services ==
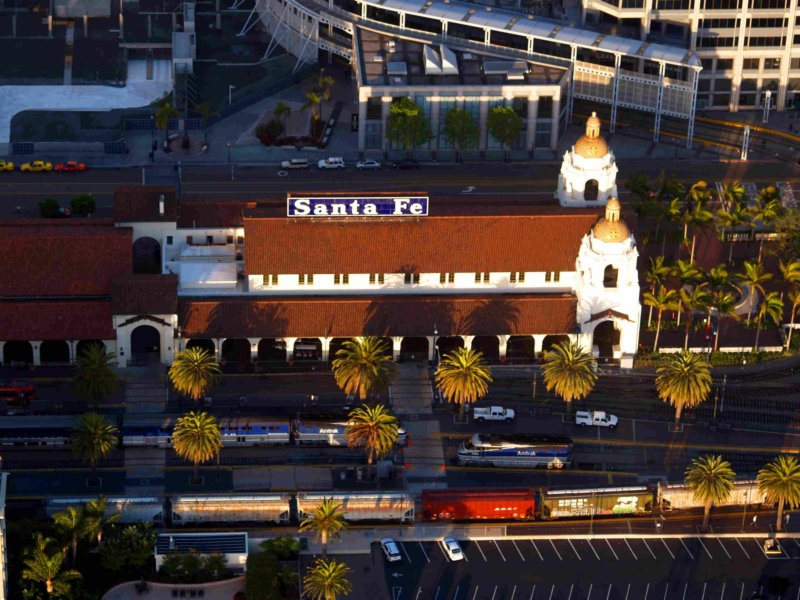
Aerial view of the station, with a Pacific Surfliner train parked as a BNSF train passes through

Today, a variety of bus, light rail, and commuter rail services call the station "home." The structure has retained most of its original features, including the large blue-and-white "Santa Fe" sign (which was added in the mid-1950s as a nod to its heritage) and the original, hundred-year-old oak benches.

=== San Diego Trolley ===
The San Diego Trolley, a modern light rail service, commenced operations on July 26, 1981, with its northern terminus at Kettner Boulevard and C Street, on the east side of the station. Relocation of the Santa Fe mainline between the depot and Old Town San Diego in 1991 allowed for an extension of the Trolley to Mission Valley.

The trolley portion of the depot was renovated from early May until October 2012, as part of the Trolley Renewal Project.

Santa Fe Depot is served by the Trolley's Blue Line and Green Line.

=== Commuter, intercity and freight rail ===
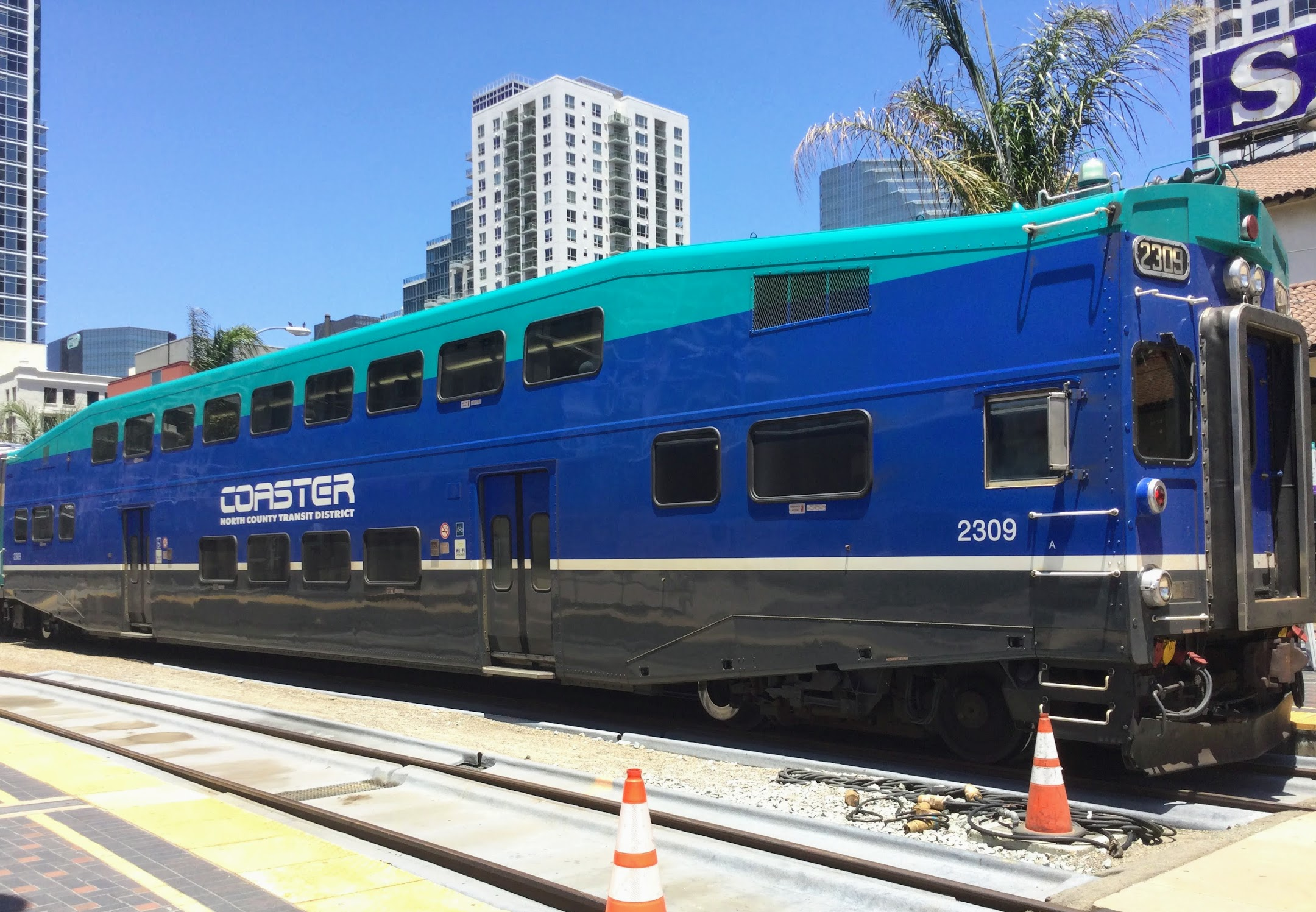
Coaster at Santa Fe Depot

The Santa Fe Depot serves as the southern terminus for the NCTD COASTER commuter rail service, which began weekday service on February 27, 1995. The station is located about forty-one miles (66 km) from the COASTER's northern terminus at Oceanside Transit Center.

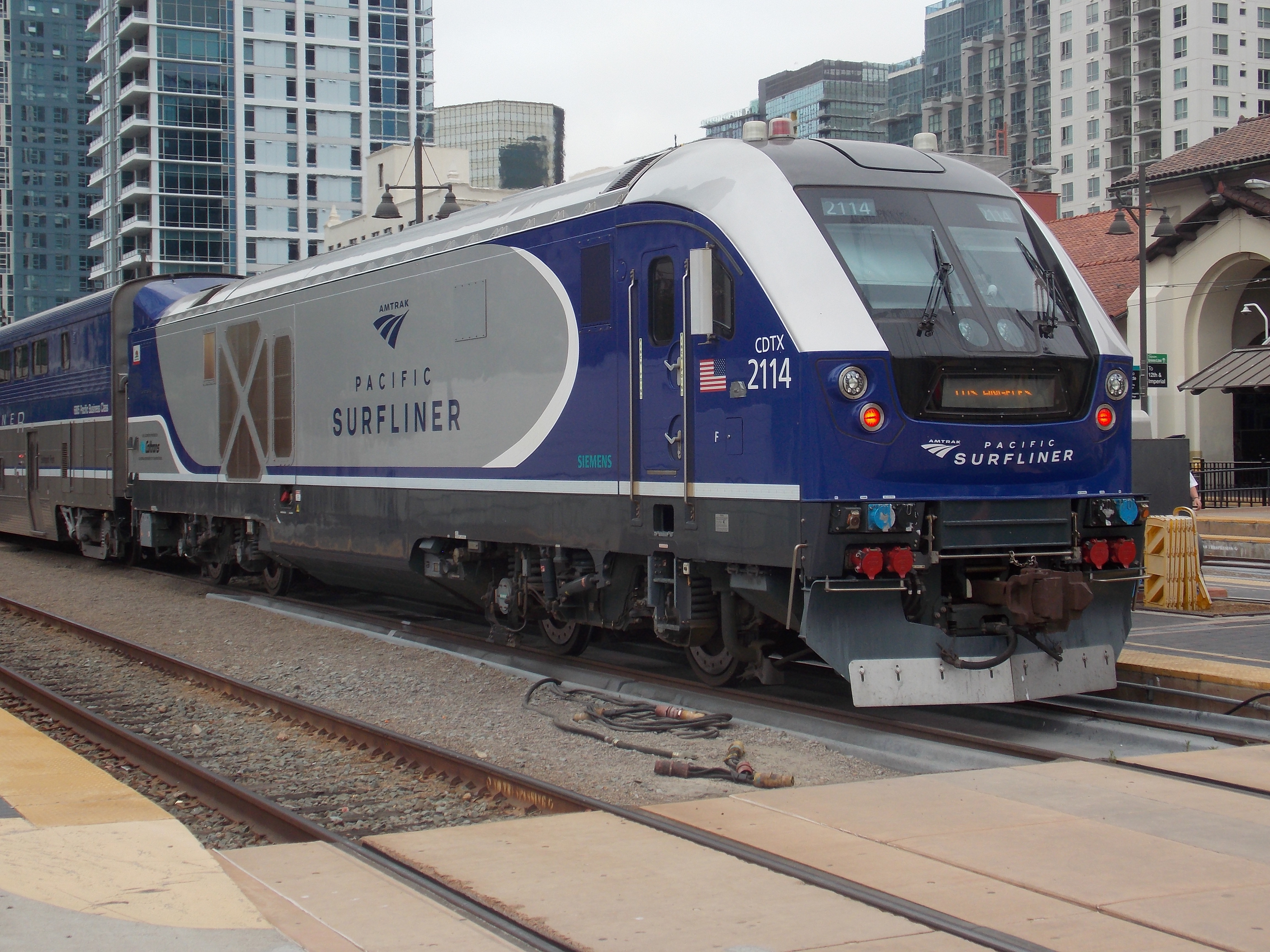
Pacific Surfliner at Santa Fe Depot

In addition to COASTER service, the station also serves as the southern terminus for Amtrak's Pacific Surfliner, successor to the San Diegan. It runs from San Diego through Los Angeles to San Luis Obispo, though the great majority of trains run along the "Surf Line" from San Diego to Los Angeles Union Station, the second busiest rail corridor in the United States after the Northeast Corridor.

Amtrak passenger figures from Santa Fe Depot reached a decade-high 777,961 boardings in 2017 (see List of busiest Amtrak stations).

Daily freight trains, operated by BNSF, also run through the station, often at night when there are fewer passenger trains. The BNSF freight yard in San Diego is about two miles (3.2 km) further south, near Petco Park and adjacent to 12th & Imperial Transit Center and Naval Base San Diego.

== Station layout ==
The depot has six tracks. The two eastern tracks handle trolley service, while the remaining four tracks handle both commuter and intercity rail service. BNSF freight trains pass through the station, typically on the westernmost track to either head south towards the freight yards, or northwards away from San Diego.

== Future service ==
The station was earlier studied as the possible southern terminus for the planned California High-Speed Rail system. Upon completion, passengers would have been able to get to Los Angeles Union Station in 1 hour and 18 minutes. However, subsequent revisions to the proposal have settled on a new southern terminus, a proposed San Diego International Airport intermodal transit center (ITC) to be built at Washington Street and Pacific Highway by 2035, as extending the high-speed rail line into downtown San Diego was likely to prove problematic.

== See also ==
- History of San Diego, California
- Museum of Contemporary Art San Diego
- List of San Diego Trolley stations
- California and the railroads
- List of Amtrak stations in California
