= Nordahl Road station =

Light rail station in Escondido, California, United States

Nordahl Road
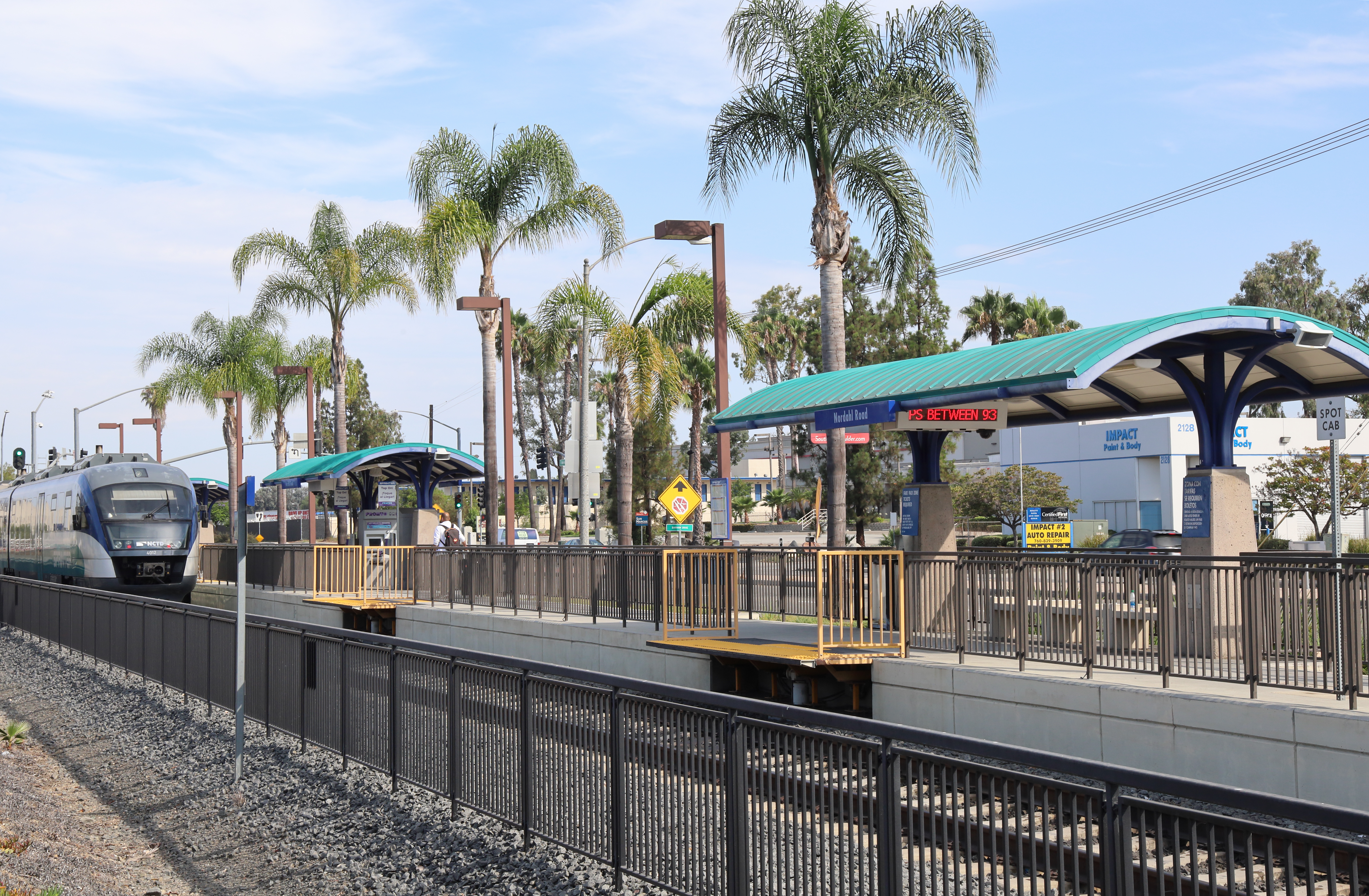
- Nordahl Road station in 2022, looking westbound

General information
- Location: 2121 Barham Drive; Escondido, California
- Coordinates: 33.1310°N 117.1241°W
- Owner: North County Transit District
- Line: Escondido Subdivision
- Platforms: 1 side platform
- Connections: NCTD: 305, 353

Construction
- Accessible: Yes

History
- Opened: March 9, 2008; 18 years ago

Services
| Preceding station | North County Transit District | Following station |
|---|---|---|
| Cal State San Marcos toward Oceanside | SPRINTER | Escondido Terminus |
Former services (at Richland station)
| Preceding station | Atchison, Topeka and Santa Fe Railway | Following station |
|---|---|---|
| San Marcos toward Oceanside | Escondido Branch | Escondido Terminus |
Location

Nordahl Road station is a station served by North County Transit District's SPRINTER hybrid rail line. It straddles the city limits of San Marcos and Escondido, California, with its mailing address in Escondido. The station is located between Barham Drive and Auto Park Way/Nordahl Road, both of which intersect East Mission Road. It consists of a single platform and track.
