= College Boulevard station =

Light rail station in Oceanside, California, United States

College Boulevard
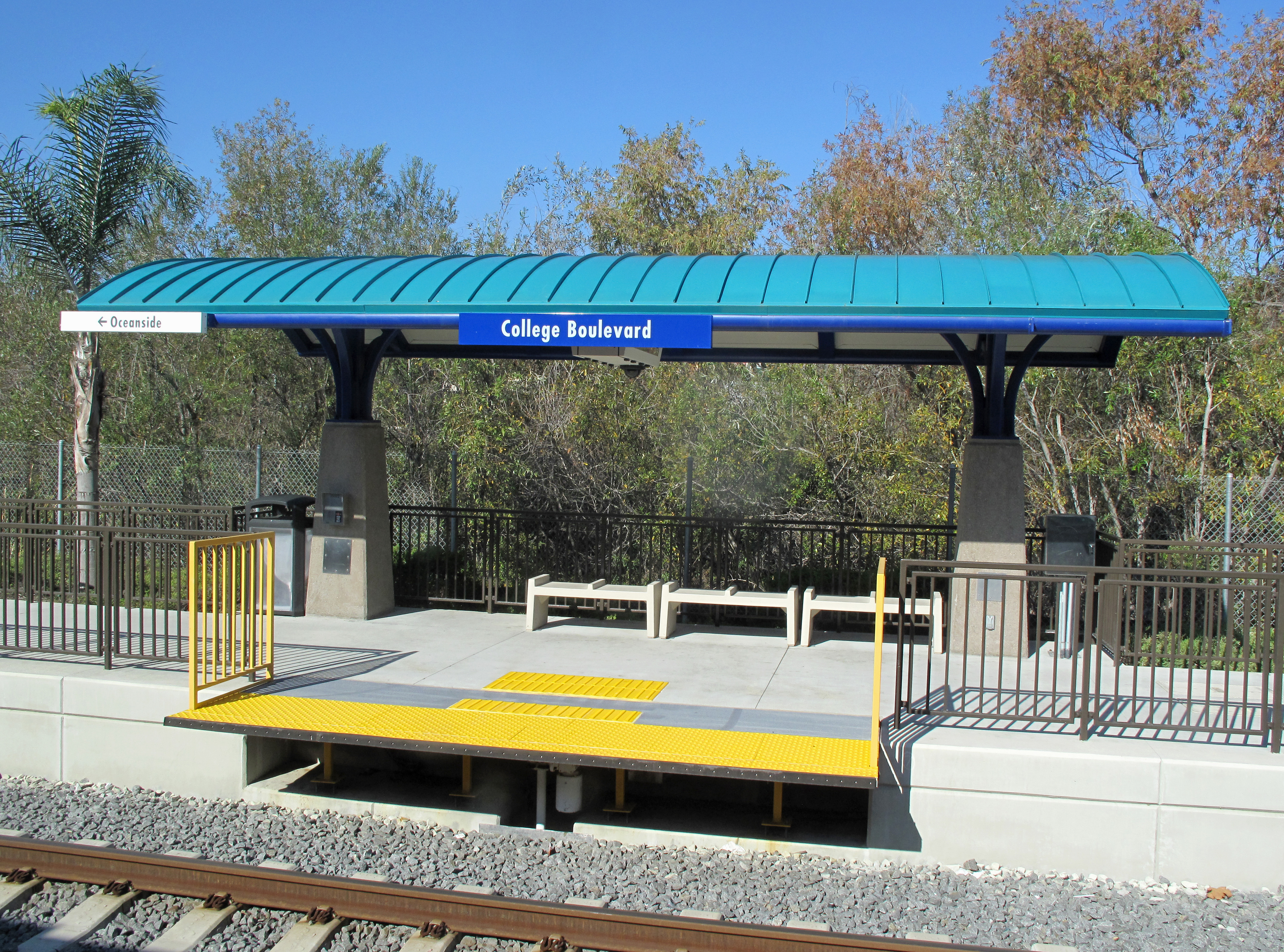
- The College Boulevard station platform

General information
- Location: 4103 1/2 Oceanside Boulevard; Oceanside, California
- Coordinates: 33.2047°N 117.2882°W
- Owner: North County Transit District
- Line: Escondido Subdivision
- Platforms: 2 side platforms
- Connections: NCTD: 315, 318, 323

Construction
- Accessible: Yes

History
- Opened: 2008; 18 years ago

Services
Preceding station	North County Transit District	Following station
Rancho Del Oro toward Oceanside	SPRINTER	Melrose Drive toward Escondido
Location

College Boulevard station is an at grade station in Oceanside, California that is served by North County Transit District's Sprinter hybrid rail line. The station is named after the nearby street, College Boulevard. The station has two tracks and two side platforms.
