= Crouch Street station =

Hybrid rail station in Oceanside, California, United States

Crouch Street
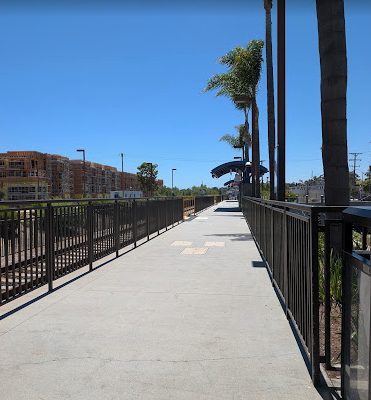
- A view of the Crouch Station from the pathway to the platform.

General information
- Location: 609 Crouch Street; Oceanside, California
- Coordinates: 33.1945°N 117.3536°W
- Owner: North County Transit District
- Line: Escondido Subdivision
- Platforms: 1 side platform
- Connections: NCTD: 318

Construction
- Accessible: Yes

History
- Opened: 2008; 18 years ago

Services
Preceding station	North County Transit District	Following station
Coast Highway toward Oceanside	SPRINTER	El Camino Real toward Escondido
Location

Crouch Street station is an at-grade station in Oceanside, California that is served by North County Transit District's Sprinter hybrid rail line. The station is near the intersection of Crouch Street and Oceanside Boulevard. It consists of a single platform and track.
