= Rancho Del Oro station =

Rancho Del Oro

General information
- Location: 3513 Oceanside Boulevard; Oceanside, California
- Coordinates: 33.2015°N 117.3113°W
- Owner: North County Transit District
- Line: Escondido Subdivision
- Platforms: 2 side platforms
- Connections: NCTD: 311, 318

Construction
- Accessible: Yes

History
- Opened: 2008

Services
Preceding station	North County Transit District	Following station
El Camino Real toward Oceanside	SPRINTER	College Boulevard toward Escondido
Location

Rancho Del Oro station is an at grade station in Oceanside, California, that is served by North County Transit District's Sprinter hybrid rail line. It is south of the intersection of Oceanside Boulevard and Rancho Del Oro Drive. The station is double tracked and has two side platforms.
