= Melrose Drive station =

Hybrid rail station in Oceanside, California, United States

Melrose Drive
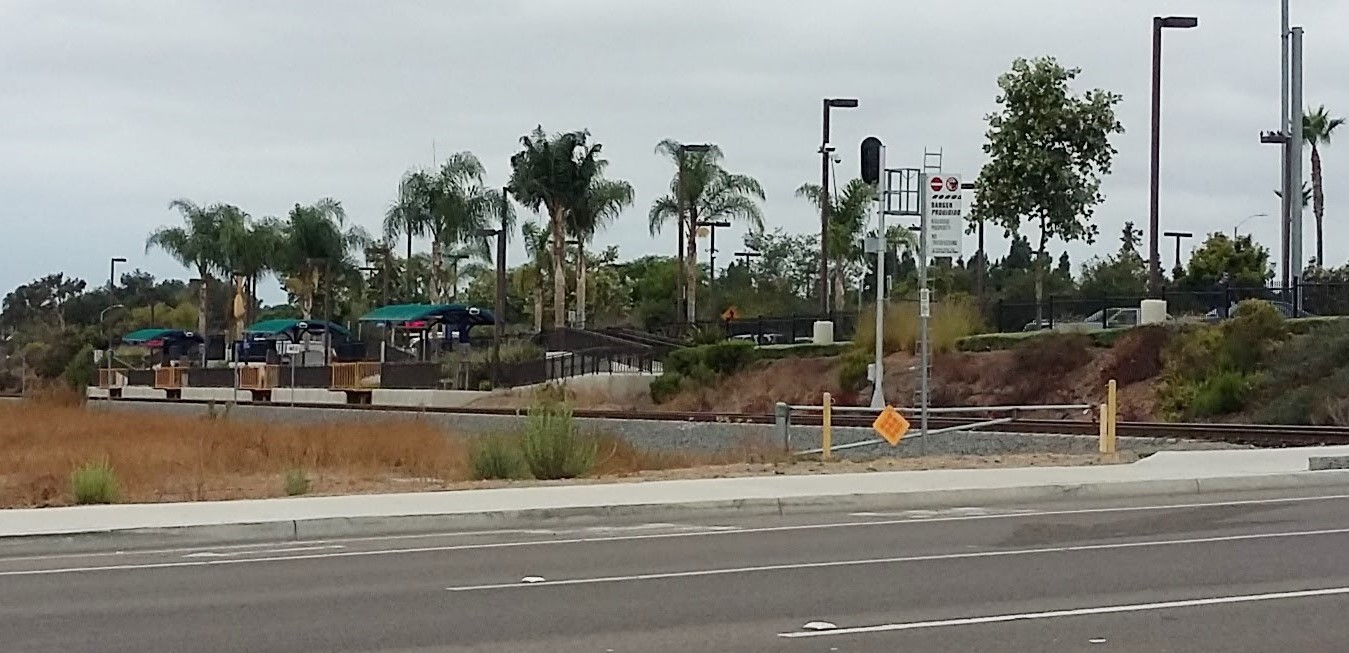
- Train platforms seen from Melrose Drive

General information
- Location: 1495 1/2 N. Melrose Drive; Oceanside, California
- Coordinates: 33.2196°N 117.2597°W
- Owner: North County Transit District
- Line: Escondido Subdivision
- Platforms: 1 side platform
- Connections: NCTD: 318

Construction
- Accessible: Yes

History
- Opened: March 9, 2008; 18 years ago

Services
Preceding station	North County Transit District	Following station
College Boulevard toward Oceanside	SPRINTER	Vista toward Escondido
Former services (at Falda station)
Preceding station	Atchison, Topeka and Santa Fe Railway	Following station
Oceanside Terminus	Escondido Branch	Vista toward Escondido
Location

Melrose Drive is an at grade station in Oceanside, California that is served by North County Transit District's Sprinter hybrid rail line. The station is located beside North Melrose Drive. It consists of a single platform and track.
