= Coast Highway station =

Light rail station in Oceanside, California, United States

Coast Highway
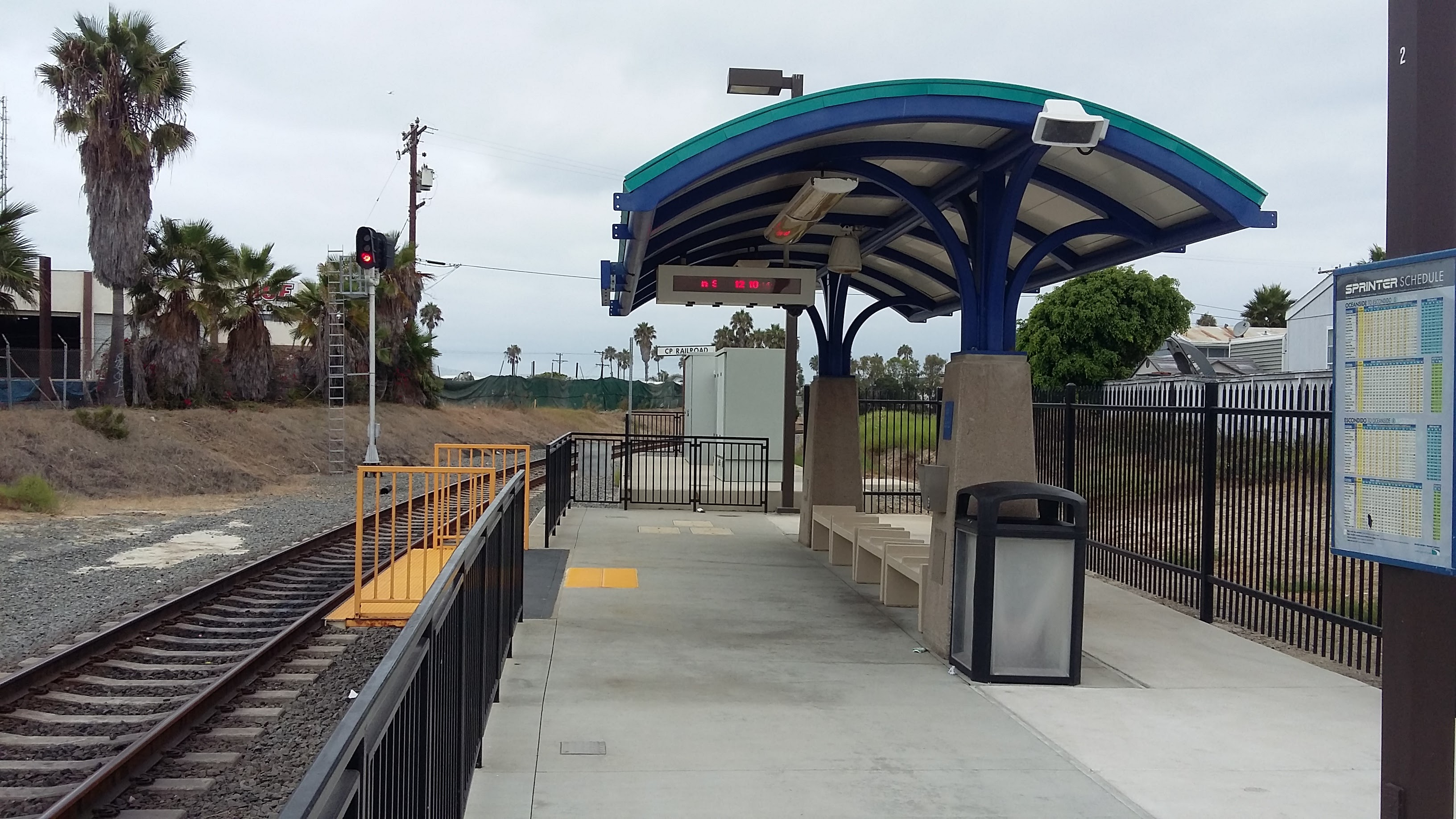
- Coast Highway station in September 2016

General information
- Location: 1304 1/2 South Tremont Street; Oceanside, California
- Coordinates: 33.1819°N 117.3689°W
- Owner: North County Transit District
- Line: Escondido Subdivision
- Platforms: 1 side platform

Construction
- Accessible: Yes

History
- Opened: 2008; 18 years ago

Services
Preceding station	North County Transit District	Following station
Oceanside Terminus	SPRINTER	Crouch Street toward Escondido
Location

Coast Highway station is an at grade station in Oceanside, California. It is served by North County Transit District's Sprinter hybrid rail line. The station is located at 1304 1/2 South Tremont Street, west of Coast Highway. It consists of a single platform and track.
