= Vista Transit Center =

Transit center in Vista, California, United States

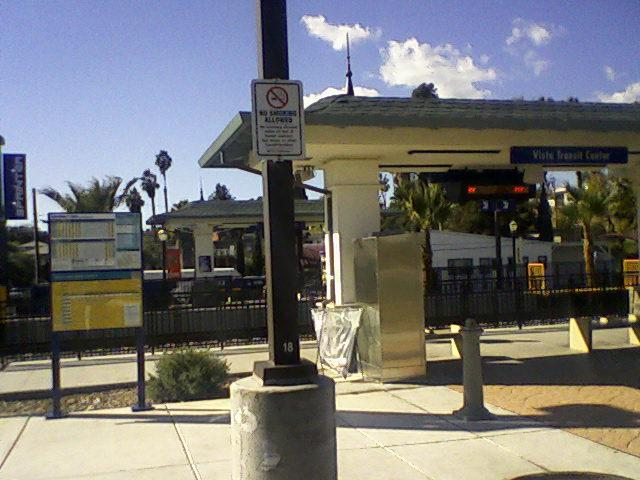
- Platforms at Vista Transit Center

General information
- Location: 240 North Santa Fe Road; Vista, California
- Coordinates: 33.2032°N 117.2450°W
- Owner: North County Transit District
- Line: Escondido Subdivision
- Platforms: 2 side platforms
- Connections: NCTD: 302, 303, 305, 306, 318, 332, 632

Construction
- Accessible: Yes

History
- Opened: March 9, 2008; 18 years ago

Services
Preceding station	North County Transit District	Following station
Melrose Drive toward Oceanside	SPRINTER	Civic Center–Vista toward Escondido
Former services (at AT&SF station)
Preceding station	Atchison, Topeka and Santa Fe Railway	Following station
Falda toward Oceanside	Escondido Branch	Buena Creek toward Escondido
Location

Vista Transit Center is a transit center near the intersection of North Santa Fe Road and Vista Village Drive in Vista, California, served by North County Transit District's SPRINTER hybrid rail line and BREEZE bus line. The station is located midpoint between the rail line's western terminus at Oceanside Transit Center and eastern terminus at Escondido Transit Center. A preview Sprinter service stopped at Vista Transit Center on December 28, 2007, and regular service commenced March 9, 2008.
