= San Marcos Civic Center station =

Hybrid rail station in San Marcos, California, United States

San Marcos Civic Center

General information
- Location: 40 West San Marcos Boulevard; San Marcos, California
- Coordinates: 33.1422°N 117.1616°W
- Owner: North County Transit District
- Line: Escondido Subdivision
- Platforms: 2 side platforms
- Connections: NCTD: 305

Construction
- Accessible: Yes

History
- Opened: March 9, 2008; 18 years ago

Services
Preceding station	North County Transit District	Following station
Palomar College toward Oceanside	SPRINTER	Cal State San Marcos toward Escondido
Former services (at AT&SF station)
Preceding station	Atchison, Topeka and Santa Fe Railway	Following station
Buena Creek toward Oceanside	Escondido Branch	Richland toward Escondido
Location

San Marcos Civic Center station is a station on North County Transit District's SPRINTER hybrid rail line. It serves the heart of San Marcos, California. It is located at the intersection of San Marcos Boulevard and West Mission Road. A preview service stopped at San Marcos Civic Center on December 28, 2007, and regular service commenced March 9, 2008.
