= Palomar College station =

Hybrid rail station in San Marcos, California, United States

Palomar College
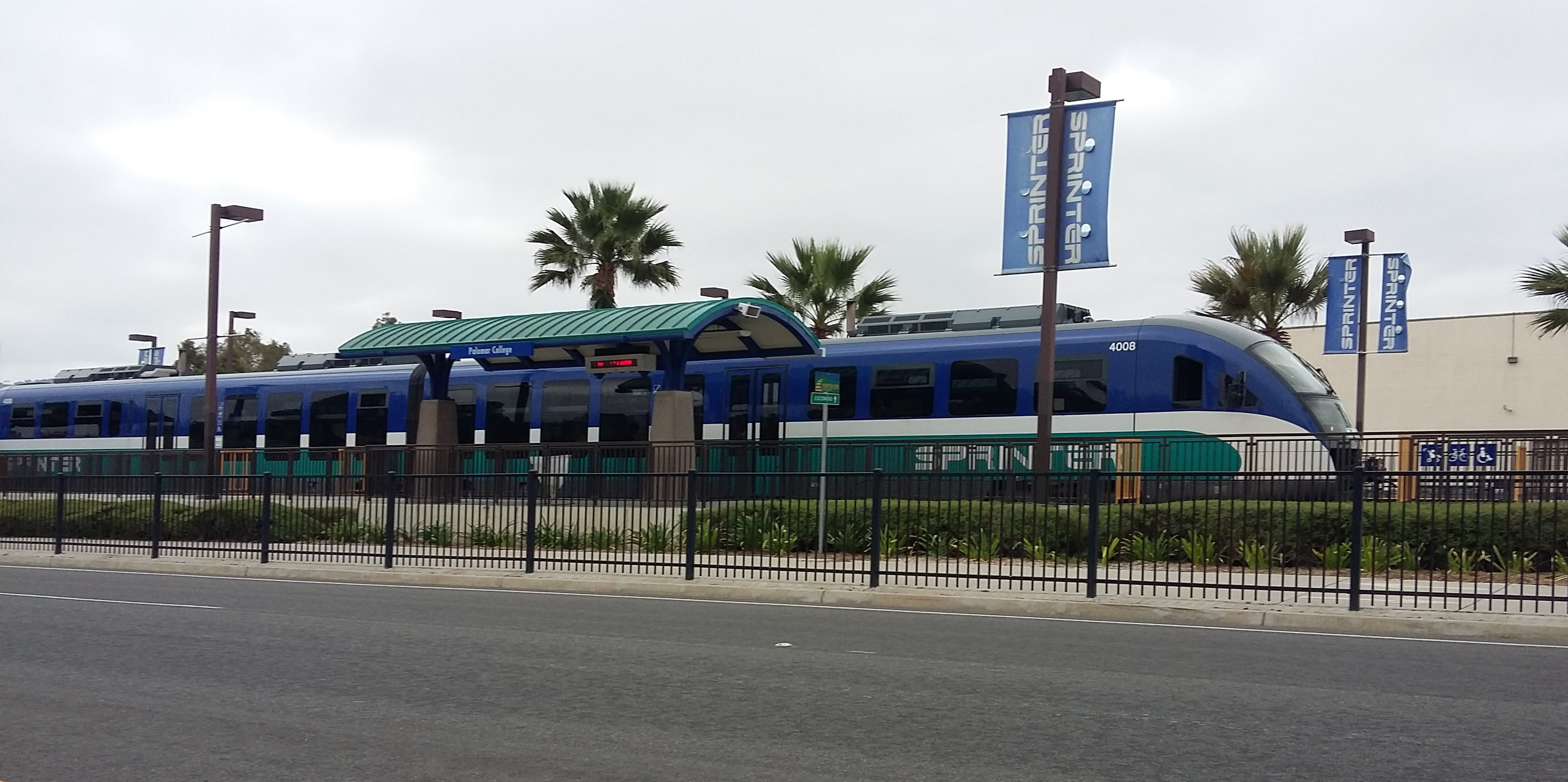
- Palomar College station in September 2016

General information
- Location: 1142 West Armorlite Drive; San Marcos, California
- Coordinates: 33.1468°N 117.1851°W
- Owner: North County Transit District
- Line: Escondido Subdivision
- Platforms: 2 side platforms
- Connections: NCTD: 304, 305, 347, 445, 604

Construction
- Accessible: Yes

History
- Opened: March 9, 2008; 18 years ago

Services
Preceding station	North County Transit District	Following station
Buena Creek toward Oceanside	SPRINTER	San Marcos Civic Center toward Escondido
Location

Palomar College Transit Center (or Palomar College) is a North County Transit District transit hub in San Marcos, California. It consists of a bus station and a train station. The bus station (signed Palomar College Transit Center on site) serves as a terminus for all BREEZE bus lines that pass through San Marcos, and is located at the main entrance at Palomar College. Across the street from the bus depot is the two-platform SPRINTER Palomar College station.
