= Buena Creek station =

Buena Creek
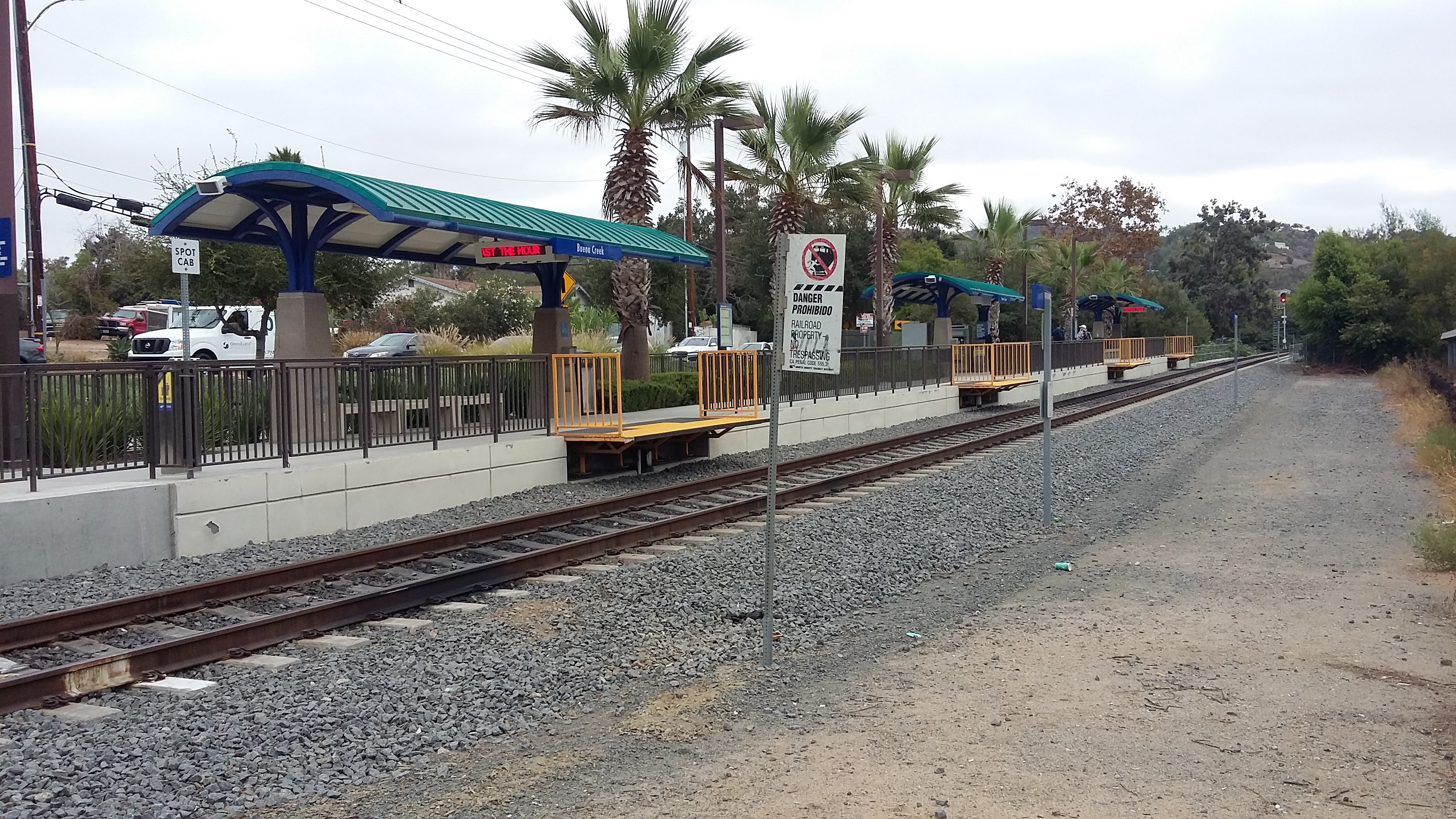
- Buena Creek station in September 2016

General information
- Location: 1923 Buena Creek Road; Vista, California
- Coordinates: 33.1734°N 117.2072°W
- Owner: North County Transit District
- Line: Escondido Subdivision
- Platforms: 1 side platform
- Connections: NCTD: 305, 332

Construction
- Accessible: Yes

History
- Opened: March 9, 2008; 18 years ago

Services
Preceding station	North County Transit District	Following station
Civic Center–Vista toward Oceanside	SPRINTER	Palomar College toward Escondido
Former services (at AT&SF station)
Preceding station	Atchison, Topeka and Santa Fe Railway	Following station
Vista toward Oceanside	Escondido Branch	San Marcos toward Escondido
Location

Buena Creek is a station in Vista, California that is served by North County Transit District's SPRINTER hybrid rail line. The station is located at 1923 Buena Creek Road. Although its mailing address lists Vista as the city, it is the only station along the entire line to be situated in an unincorporated portion of San Diego County. It consists of a single platform and track.
