= Escondido Subdivision =

Railway line in San Diego County, California, US

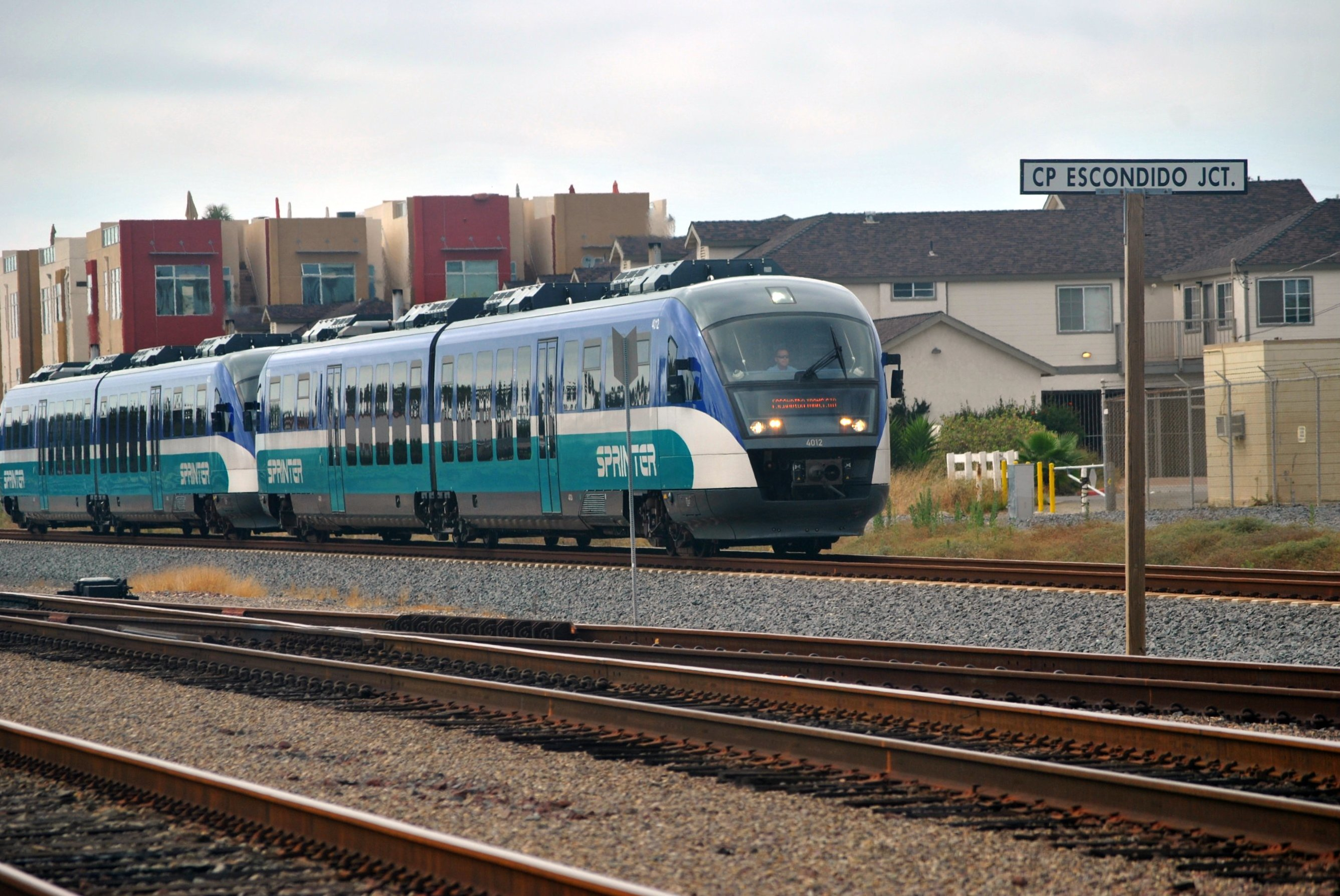
A Sprinter train departing Oceanside Transit Center

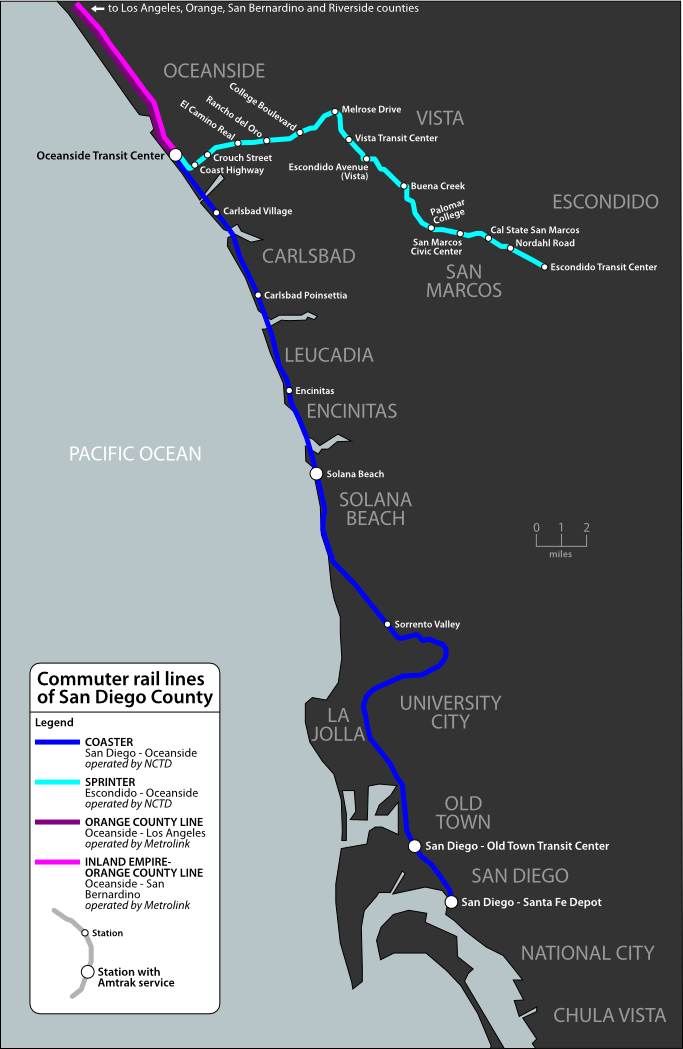
NCTD route map. The Escondido Subdivision is shown in light blue.

The Escondido Subdivision is a 22-mile (35 km) branch railway line between Oceanside, California, and Escondido, California, in the North County region of San Diego County. It is primarily used today by the Sprinter hybrid rail and local freight trains serving Escondido industries late at night, after the last Sprinter train of the day is taken out of service.

== History ==
The line was built in 1888, along with the Surf Line, which is the main line it connects to on its western end and serves as the only rail connection between San Diego and Los Angeles. The line formerly served Santa Fe trains, with passenger trains operating until 1946. The North County Transit District, which operates local public transit services, purchased the line from the Santa Fe Railroad in 1992, to operate passenger rail service, which started on December 28, 2007. Before passenger service could start, the tracks of the branch were re-laid with new stations and an elevated loop constructed to Cal State San Marcos station, in preparation for the Sprinter.

Local Santa Fe (later BNSF) freight trains continued to operate over the line until 2008, when the service was contracted out to Pacific Sun Railroad; this practice ended on October 1, 2020, when PSRR's contract with BNSF expired. For a very short amount of time, NCTD used Coaster Equipment for track repairs. In 2020, the Pacific Sun railroad stopped service, and freight operations on the line were given back to BNSF Railway, which also operates freight service on the connecting Surf Line.

== Historic station stops ==
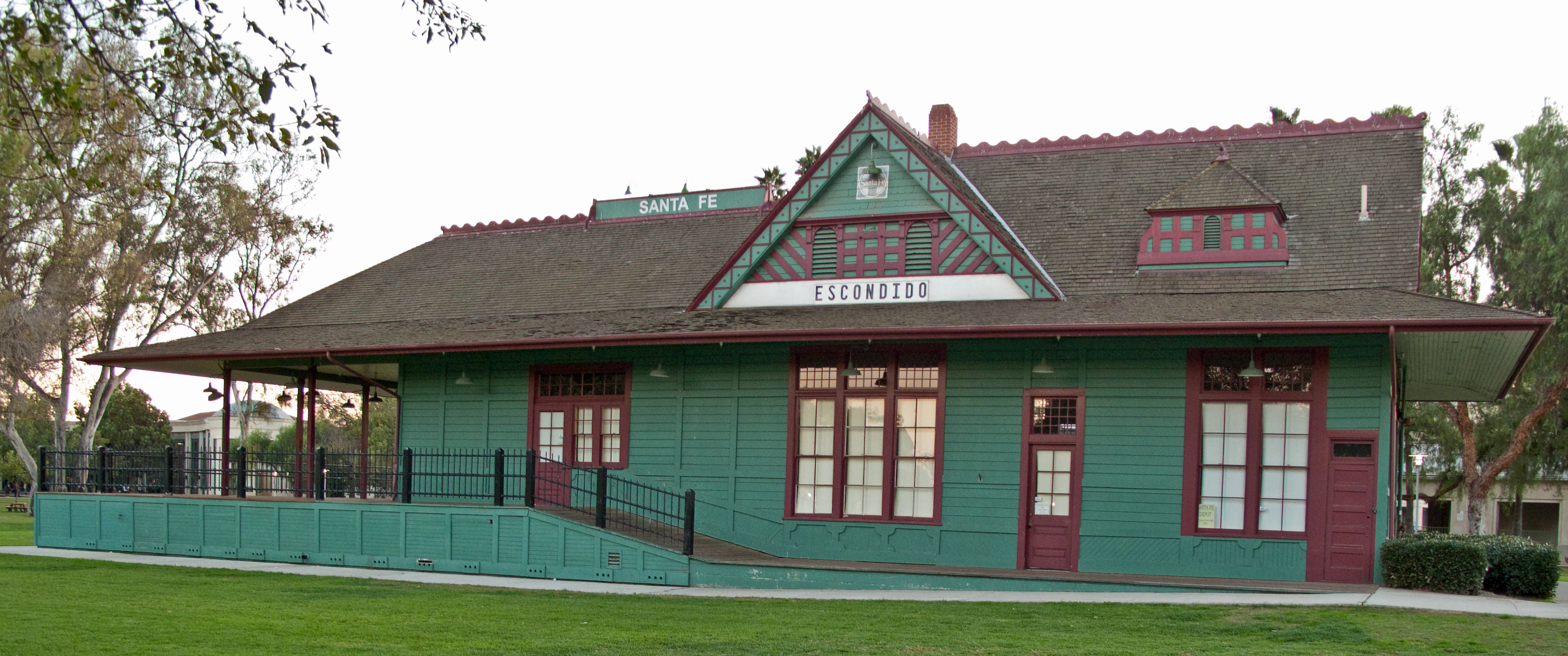
The historic Santa Fe Railway depot in Escondido, now part of Grape Day Park.

Key:	Open	Closed

Municipality	Station	mi (km)	Services	Opened	Closed
Oceanside	Oceanside	99.3 (160)	Amtrak: Pacific Surfliner; Coaster; Sprinter; Metrolink: Inland Empire–Orange County Orange County; NCTD Breeze; Greyhound	1984 (oldest station 1886)	
Oceanside	Coast Highway	100.2 (161)	Sprinter	March 9, 2008	
Oceanside	Crouch Street	101.5 (163)	Sprinter; NCTD Breeze: 318	March 9, 2008	
Oceanside	El Camino Real	102.9 (166)	Sprinter; NCTD Breeze: 309	March 9, 2008	
Oceanside	Rancho Del Oro	104.1 (168)	Sprinter; NCTD Breeze: 311, 318, 323	March 9, 2008	
Oceanside	College Boulevard	105.5 (170)	Sprinter; NCTD Breeze: 315, 318, 323, 325	March 9, 2008	
Oceanside	Melrose Drive	107.5 (173)	Sprinter; NCTD Breeze: 318	March 9, 2008	
Oceanside	Falda		ATSF services (formerly)	1913 or earlier	Between September 1936 and January 1937
Vista	Vista Transit Center	109.1 (176)	Sprinter; NCTD Breeze: 302, 303, 305, 306, 318, 332, 334, 632, 634	March 9, 2008	
Vista	Vista		ATSF services (formerly)	1913 or earlier	1946
Vista	Civic Center–Vista	110.1 (177)	Sprinter	March 9, 2008	
Vista	Buena Creek	112.4 (181)	Sprinter; NCTD Breeze: 305, 332	March 9, 2008	
Vista	Buena		ATSF services (formerly)	1913 or earlier	Between September 1936 and January 1937
San Marcos	Palomar College	115.1 (185)	Sprinter; NCTD Breeze: 304, 305, 347, 445, 645	March 9, 2008	
San Marcos	San Marcos Civic Center	116.4 (187)	Sprinter; NCTD Breeze: 305	March 9, 2008	
San Marcos	San Marcos (former)		ATSF services (formerly)	1913 or earlier	Between May 1935 and September 1936
San Marcos	Cal State San Marcos	117.2 (189)	Sprinter; NCTD Breeze: 347		
San Marcos	Richland		ATSF services (formerly)	1913 or earlier	Between 1926 and 1928
Escondido	Nordahl Road	119.2 (192)	Sprinter; NCTD Breeze: 305, 353	March 9, 2008	
Escondido	Escondido Transit Center	121.3 (195)	Sprinter; NCTD Breeze: 305, 308, Rapid 350, 351, 352, 353, 354, 355, 356, 357, 358, 359, FLEX 371, 388, 608, 651/652; Metropolitan Transit System: Rapid 235, Rapid Express 280	March 9, 2008	
Escondido	Escondido (former)		ATSF services (formerly)	1888	1946
