= Sprinter (rail service) =

Hybrid rail service in San Diego County, California

SPRINTER

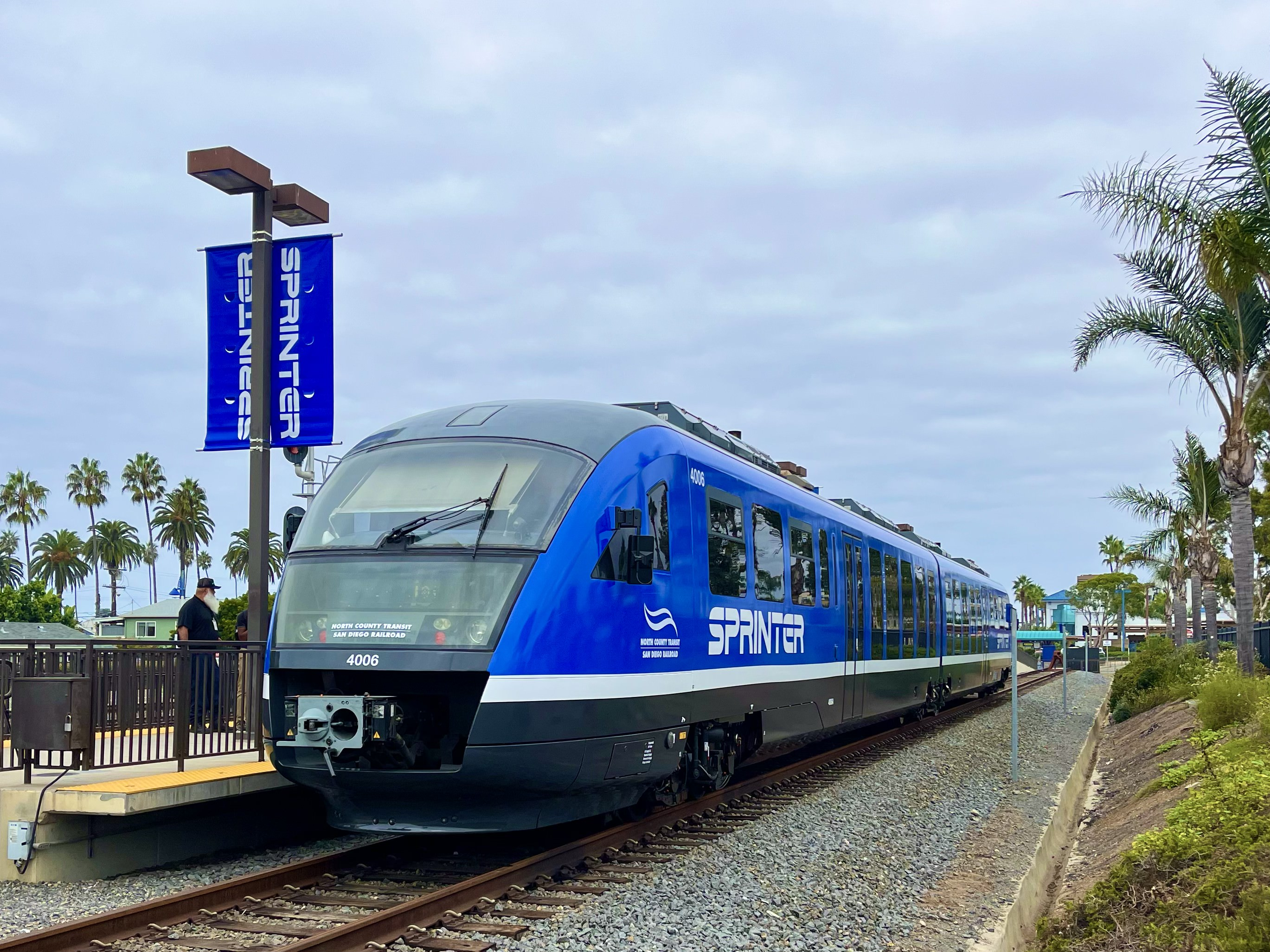
- A Sprinter train waits at Oceanside Transit Center

Overview
- Service type: Hybrid rail
- Locale: North County region of San Diego County, California, U.S.
- First service: March 9, 2008; 18 years ago
- Current operator: North County Transit – San Diego Railroad
- Former operators: Previously contracted to: Veolia Transportation, later Veolia Transdev (2008-2016); Bombardier Transportation, later Alstom (2016-2022)
- Daily ridership: 4,900 (weekdays, Q2 2026)
- Annual ridership: 1,684,400 (2025)
- Website: gonctd.com

Route
- Termini: Oceanside Transit Center; Escondido Transit Center
- Stops: 15
- Distance travelled: 22 miles (35 km)
- Average journey time: 53 minutes
- Service frequency: Half-hourly to hourly (34 per day each direction)
- Line used: Escondido Subdivision

Technical
- Rolling stock: 12 Siemens Desiro
- Track gauge: 4 ft 8 1/2 in (1,435 mm) standard gauge
- Operating speed: Avg.:25 mph (40 km/h); Top: 50 mph (80 km/h)
- Timetable number: 399 (internal documents only)
Route map
SPRINTER highlighted in navy

Sprinter (stylized in all caps) is a hybrid rail service in the North County region of San Diego County, California. It runs between the cities of Escondido and Oceanside, California, primarily using the 22-mile (35 km) Escondido Subdivision, though it briefly deviates onto an elevated viaduct to serve the California State University, San Marcos, campus. The service is owned and operated by North County Transit – San Diego Railroad (NCTD).

The line has fifteen stations serving Oceanside, Vista, San Marcos, and Escondido, including stops at California State University, San Marcos, and Palomar College. Sprinter trains operate every 30 to 60 minutes and primarily serve students and commuters.

NCTD also operates the Coaster commuter rail service and the Breeze bus network. At Oceanside Transit Center, the Sprinter provides connections to Breeze buses, the Coaster, two Metrolink lines (the Orange County Line and Inland Empire–Orange County Line), and Amtrak’s Pacific Surfliner inter-city rail service.

== History ==
Sprinter is the first passenger train service along the Escondido Branch since the Atchison, Topeka and Santa Fe Railway discontinued passenger service in 1946. Originally built in 1888, the entire line had to be rebuilt to accommodate more traffic and be elevated because the line runs along a river.

The funding for Sprinter originated with the TransNet Tax (Proposition C) measure passed by San Diego County voters in 1987 to relieve traffic congestion. A third of the tax was dedicated to mass transit. The $477 million project also was funded through a $152 million Full Funding Grant Agreement from the Federal Transit Administration.

NCTD purchased the line in 1992 from the Santa Fe Railroad. Sprinter was officially “founded” in 2005, with construction starting on the line that same year and scheduled for completion in December 2007. Sprinter was previewed on December 28, 2007, with full revenue service scheduled to begin on January 13, 2008. Opening was delayed due to safety and other concerns, and began on March 9, 2008.

Sprinter was the least expensive rail project per mile of 10 rail projects built or planned in California in 2005. American Public Works Association (APWA) awarded Sprinter the Transportation Project of the Year for projects valued over $75 million.

Sprinter operations were originally contracted to Veolia Transportation in 2008. After Veolia Transportation was merged into Veolia's new subsidiary, Veolia Transdev, in 2011, Transdev inherited operations of Sprinter. However, in 2016, NCTD transferred its rail operations and maintenance to Bombardier Transportation, with Bombardier taking over the Sprinter on June 11, 2016, and then the Coaster on June 18. Bombardier, part of Alstom from 2021, continued to operate the Coaster and Sprinter until June 27, 2022, when operations and maintenance were placed under the direct management of the NCTD.

== Service ==
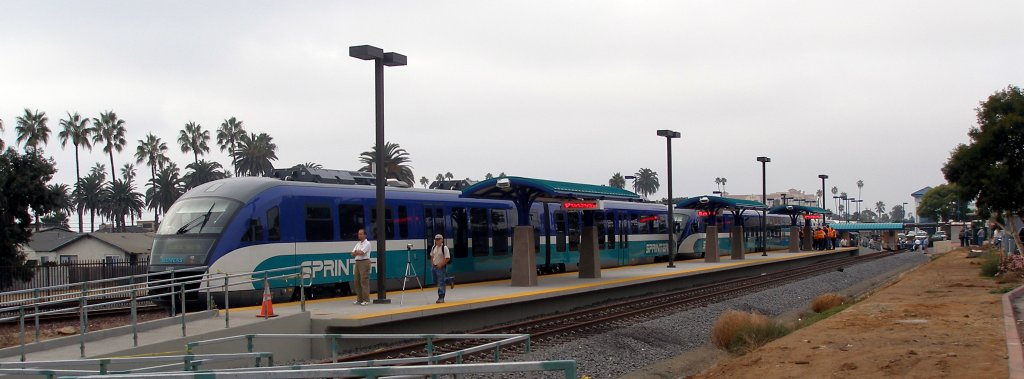
Sprinter at Oceanside in March 2007.

Sprinter runs every 30 minutes in both directions seven days a week, from approximately 4 am to 9 pm. Trains run later on Friday and Saturday evenings, to approximately 10:30pm (westbound to Oceanside), and to approximately 11:30pm (eastbound to Escondido). Saturday/Sunday/Holiday trains operate every 30 minutes between 10 am and 6 pm and hourly before 10 am and after 6 pm.

=== Stations ===
Sprinter serves a total of 15 stations, including the two termini at Oceanside and Escondido. Three of these stations are transit centers – the two termini, Oceanside Transit Center and Escondido Transit Center, along with the Vista Transit Center station.

Location	Station	Connections
Oceanside	Oceanside Transit Center	Amtrak: Pacific Surfliner; Metrolink: Orange County Line, Inland Empire–Orange County Line; COASTER; BREEZE: 101, 302, 303, 313, 318, FLEX 392, FLEX 395
Oceanside	Coast Highway	
Oceanside	Crouch Street	BREEZE: 318
Oceanside	El Camino Real	BREEZE: 309
Oceanside	Rancho Del Oro	BREEZE: 311, 318
Oceanside	College Boulevard	BREEZE: 315, 318, 325
Oceanside	Melrose Drive	BREEZE: 318
Vista	Vista Transit Center	BREEZE: 302, 303, 305, 306, 318, 332, 632
Vista	Civic Center–Vista	
Vista	Buena Creek	BREEZE: 305, 332
San Marcos	Palomar College	BREEZE: 304, 305, 347, 445, 604
San Marcos	San Marcos Civic Center	BREEZE: 305
San Marcos	Cal State San Marcos	BREEZE: 347
Escondido	Nordahl Road	BREEZE: 305, 353
Escondido	Escondido Transit Center	BREEZE: 305, 308, Rapid 350, 351, 352, 353, 354, 355, 356, 357, 358, 359, FLEX 371, 388, 608, 651/652; MTS: Rapid 235, Rapid Express 280

=== Fares ===
A one-way trip on Sprinter costs $2.50 per rider, $1.25 for Senior (60+)/Disabled/Medicare riders (children under 5 years old ride for free; up to 3).

In addition, riders can buy passes (e.g. Regional 24-Hour Pass, Regional 30-Day Pass) which allow for unlimited travel not only on Sprinter, but on other NCTD and MTS systems, such as the San Diego Trolley, and Breeze and MTS buses, for the duration of that pass. Rides on those systems, plus the Coaster commuter rail, and express buses, require a "RegionPlus" pass.

==== Pronto fare system ====
Sprinter, along with all other NCTD and MTS services, utilizes the Pronto contactless fare system introduced in September 2021; succeededing the first-generation Compass Card system. The Pronto fare system allows for a tap-on, tap-off approach, so riders on Sprinter tap-on when entering the station platform (using one of the station's validators), and tap-off when arriving at the destination stop, in order to deduct the correct fare. Physical Pronto cards can be purchased at vending machines at NCTD stations or at customer service centers; electronic versions can be purchased through the website or through the mobile applications.

=== Ridership ===
While pre-opening studies of the Sprinter line projected an average weekday ridership of 11,000, average weekday ridership in 2012 was 7,800, 70% of the original projected daily ridership. For 2012, this corresponded to 2.4 million annual ridership. However, the average weekday ridership for Sprinter in the first quarter of 2013 was 8,500 according to the American Public Transportation Association (APTA) Transit Ridership Report for Q1 2013, which is 77% of the original projected daily ridership for the system.

Just after the COVID-19 pandemic, ridership for Sprinter declined by 46 percent (fiscal year 2020-21), according to The San Diego Union-Tribune. During the pandemic, it is assumed ridership was dramatically reduced as many worked or went to school from home.

== Rolling stock ==
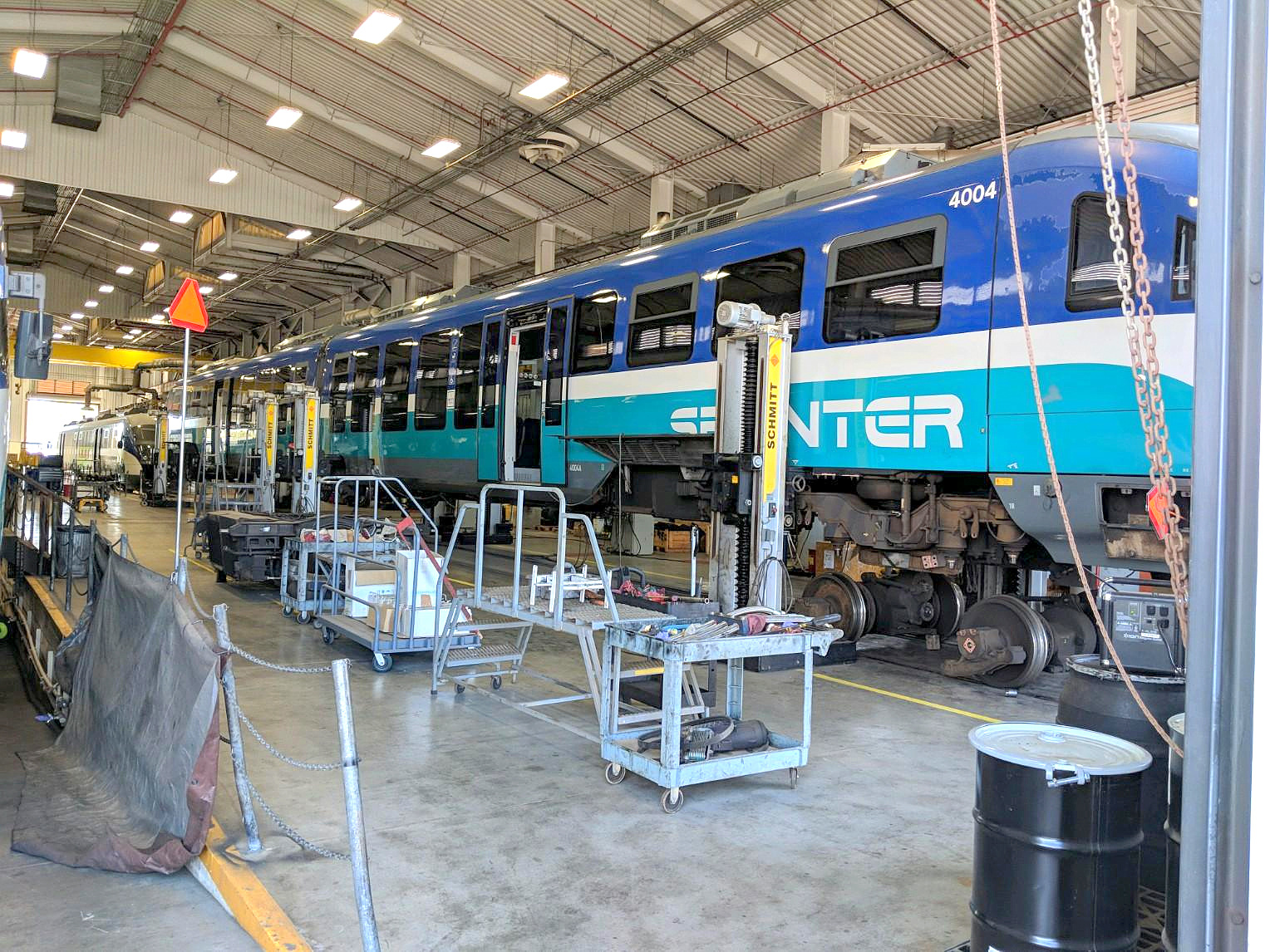
Sprinter vehicle at maintenance shop in Escondido

The Sprinter service operates with Siemens Desiro-class diesel multiple units (DMUs), commonly used by main-line regional railways in Europe. In August 2006, twelve married pairs of Siemens VT642 Desiro DMUs were delivered to the Escondido Transit Center, undergoing acceptance testing in early 2007.

These trains are not FRA-compliant for mixed operations with freight trains, so freight service is restricted to non-passenger hours. Due to this limitation, some sources, including the American Public Transportation Association, classify the Sprinter as light rail, though it does not fit the conventional definition.

As of 2025, only five of the original vehicles remain in service, while the rest are used for parts due to ongoing issues with traction motors, rail trucks, and electronic components, as well as difficulties in sourcing replacements. Although the trains were designed for a 30-year lifespan, NCTD is considering replacing them at an estimated cost of over $350 million, with additional expenses likely for station modifications to accommodate new equipment.

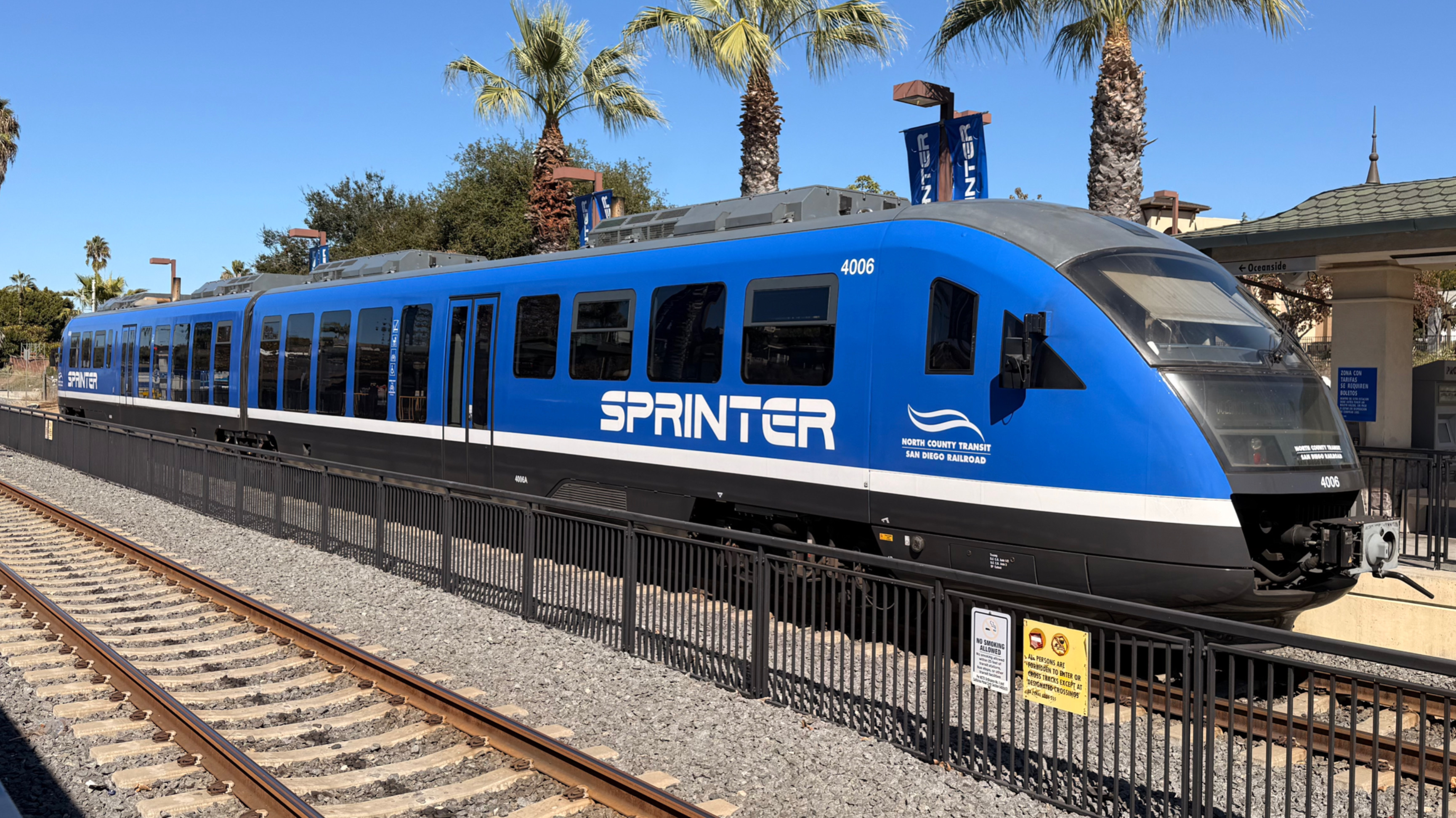
A Sprinter DMU with the Phase II livery at the Vista Transit Center

In September 2025, NCTD held a press conference in Oceanside celebrating their 50th anniversary, and the agency unveiled a Sprinter DMU wearing the new Phase II livery. The new Sprinter livery is similar to the Coaster Phase II livery, without the teal accent, and features the new NCTD logo.

== Future service plans ==
Future development plans for Sprinter are currently focused on increasing the frequency of the service to 20 minutes per train departure, from Sprinter's current 30-minute schedule. An increased schedule will require more double-tracking of the Sprinter rail line as currently only 9.6 miles (44%) of the Sprinter's rail line is double-tracked. The preferred alternative project for more double-tracking on the rail line involves increased double-tracking around Crouch St. station through College Blvd. station, and around Palomar College station through Nordahl Rd. station. It is projected that this project will require six years to reach completion.

On December 23, 2022, NCTD received funding of 7 million dollars. The funding from Consolidated Appropriations Act was requested by Congressman Mike Levin. The SPRINTER Corridor Service Improvement Project will be completed in two phases. The first phase will modernize the signal and communications systems along the corridor to improve safety, enhance community connectivity, and reduce service disruptions. The funding is focused on increasing the frequency of trains to every 15 minutes from the 30 minute frequency that Sprinter currently runs on.

Additionally, NCTD would like to implement Sprinter Express train service that would stop at only the five stations (Oceanside Transit Center, El Camino Real, Vista Transit Center, San Marcos Civic Center, and Escondido Transit Center) with the greatest ridership along the route. The Express service would use freight tracks east of the San Marcos Civic Center station for a direct route to bypass the CSU San Marcos station dogleg and further reduce travel times between the termini.

Longer-term, SANDAG's 2050 Regional Transportation Plan projects one extension of Sprinter by 2050. The extension would be from Sprinter's current eastern terminus at the Escondido Transit Center, south (presumably along S Centre City Parkway) to the North County Mall/Del Lago Transit Center. No other extensions of the Sprinter (e.g. to San Diego Zoo Safari Park, or to McClellan–Palomar Airport) are included in the plan.

== Criticism ==
Sprinter has encountered some dissatisfaction in northern San Diego County. For example, business owners in Oceanside have attributed flooding in November 2007 and January 2008 to Sprinter, since its construction raised railroad beds and narrowed creeks. Some have also criticized the limited schedule. In response to the limited schedule, NCTD expanded Friday and Saturday Night service in 2011, the last trips leaving out of Escondido (Westbound) at 10:33pm and out of Oceanside (Eastbound) at 11:33pm.

== Incidents ==
=== Accidents ===
On March 11, 2008, a westbound Sprinter train struck a man who was lying on the tracks under a State Route 78 bridge in San Marcos. It was not immediately clear if the man was aware of the approach of the train. However, the man, who was covered by a sleeping bag at the time he was struck, spoke of suicide while in the emergency room.

On March 23, 2012, a man was struck by a westbound Sprinter train at the West Mission Road and North Pacific Street crossing. The victim's death was ruled a suicide by the San Diego County medical examiner's office. The operator of the train applied the brakes and sounded the horn, but was unable to avoid the collision. The victim died at the scene.

On March 4, 2025, a westbound Sprinter train heading to Oceanside collided with a pickup truck at the Enterprise Street grade crossing just after heading out of Escondido Transit Center. One person inside the truck was killed.

=== Service suspension (2013) ===
On February 28, 2013, the California Public Utilities Commission conducted an inspection of Sprinter vehicles. During that inspection, the CPUC discovered accelerated patterns of wear on the central axle brakes of all 12 vehicles. As a result, on March 8, 2013, NCTD suspended service on the entire line. NCTD established bus replacement service for the duration of Sprinter service interruption which lasted 70 days. Sprinter resumed regular service on May 18, 2013, with the last day of the supplemental express bus service on May 24.

== See also ==
- Transportation in San Diego County
  - Coaster (rail service)
  - San Diego Trolley
