= San Marcos, California =

City in California, United States

- City
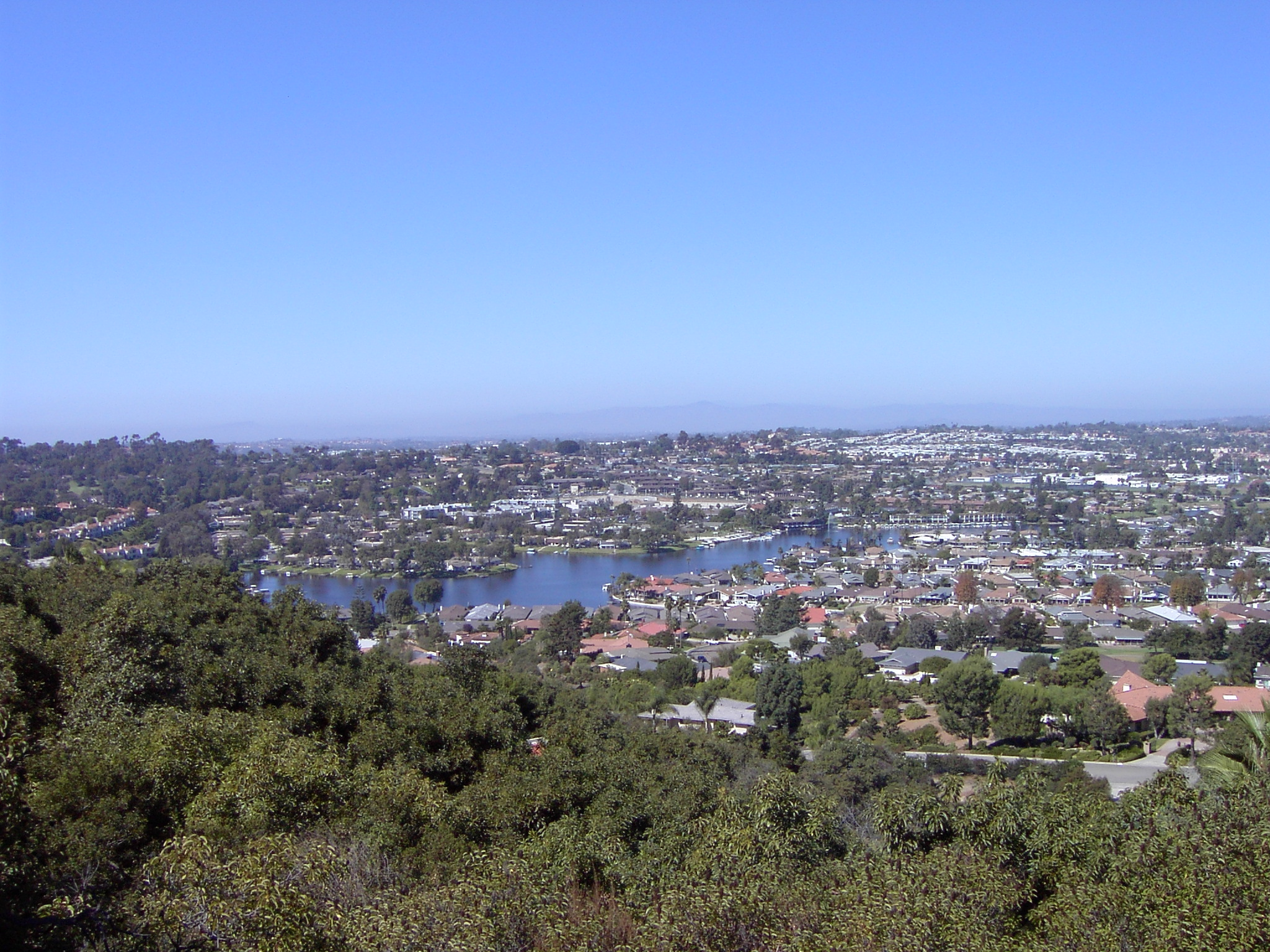
- Looking north toward Lake San Marcos

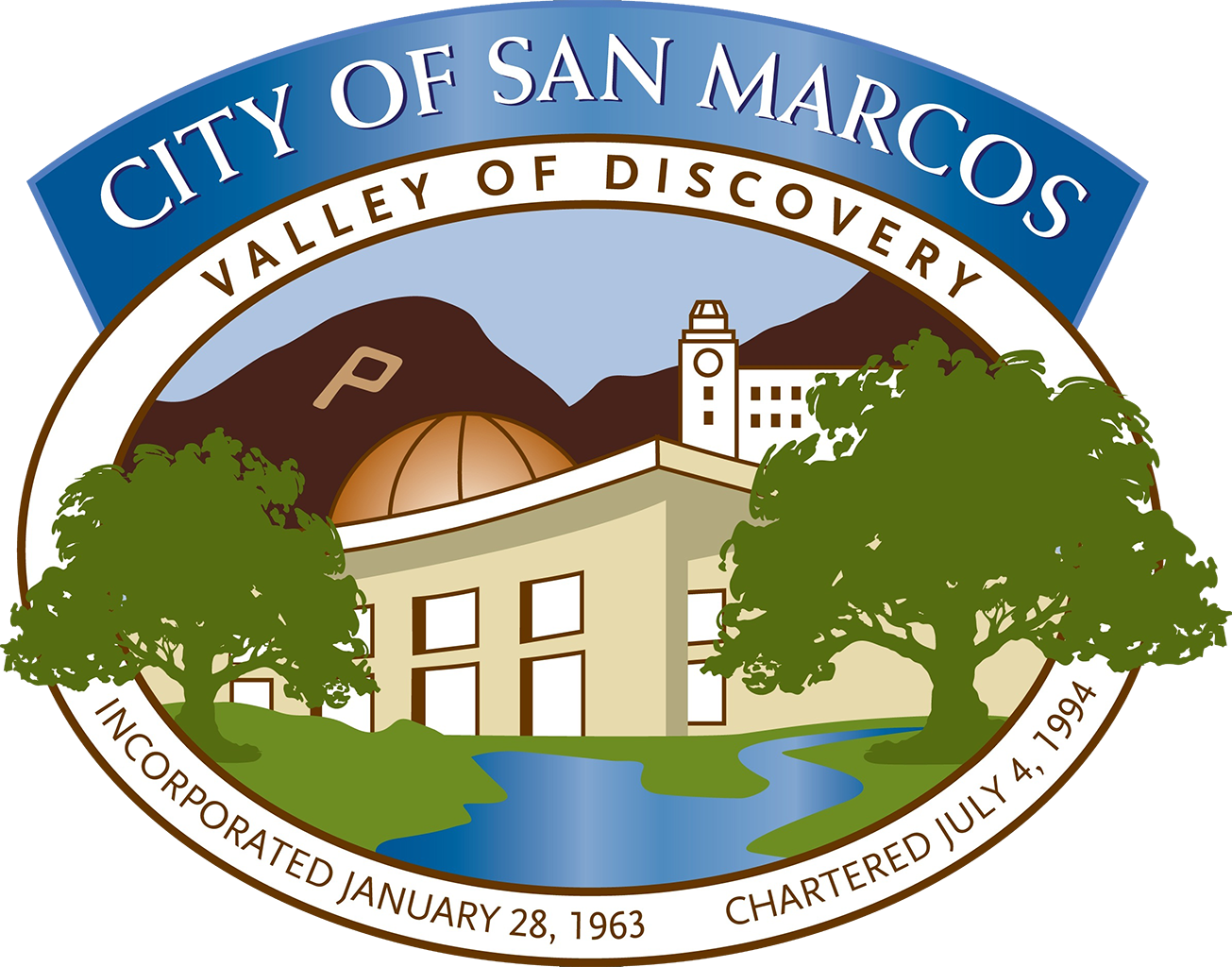
- Seal
- Nickname: Valley of Discovery
- Motto: Discover Life's Possibilities
- Interactive map of San Marcos, California
- Location in the United States
- Coordinates: 33°8′31″N 117°10′13″W
- Country: United States
- State: California
- County: San Diego
- Incorporated: January 28, 1963
- Chartered: July 4, 1994

Government
  - Type: Council/Manager
  - Mayor: Rebecca Jones

Area
  - Total: 24.37 sq mi (63.13 km^{2})
  - Land: 24.36 sq mi (63.08 km^{2})
  - Water: 0.019 sq mi (0.05 km^{2}) 0.08%

Population (2020)
  - Total: 94,833
  - Rank: 80th in California
  - Density: 3,894/sq mi (1,503/km^{2})
- Time zone: UTC−8 (Pacific)
  - Summer (DST): UTC−7 (PDT)
- ZIP Codes: 92069, 92078–92079, 92096
- Area codes: 442/760
- FIPS code: 06-68196
- GNIS feature IDs: 1661388, 2411797
- Website: www.sanmarcosca.gov

San Marcos (/ˌsæn ˈmɑːrkoʊs/ SAN MAR-kohs; Spanish for "St. Mark") is a city in the North County region of San Diego County, California, United States. As of the 2020 census, the city's population was 94,833. It is the site of California State University San Marcos and Palomar College. The city is bordered by Escondido to the east, Encinitas to the southwest, Carlsbad to the west, and Vista to the northwest. Lake San Marcos is an enclave, or county island, within the southwestern part of the city and its sphere of influence but is an unincorporated community.

== History ==
According to some historical legends, the San Luis Rey Mission flocks were robbed by a small band of Native Americans in the late 18th century. Fleeing the Spanish troops, the Native Americans escaped to the hills. While pursuing the Native Americans in 1797 the Spaniards came upon a fertile valley, which was named Los Vallecitos de San Marcos (Little Valleys of Saint Mark) to honor the day of discovery: April 25, St. Mark’s Day. On April 22, 1840, Governor Juan B. Alvarado granted Rancho Vallecitos de San Marcos to his relative, Jose María Alvarado. Jose Alvarado was killed at the Pauma Massacre in 1846, and the land was left to his wife; she then sold the land to Lorenzo Soto. In the late 1850s, Soto sold part of his land to Cave Couts, and his family was soon raising livestock. Although Cave Couts owned the land, Major Gustavus French Merriam from Topeka, Kansas, made the first permanent settlement. Merriam homesteaded 160 acres (0.65 km^{2}) in the north Twin Oaks Valley and began wine and honey production.

German and Dutch immigrants began moving into the area in the early 1880s. In 1883, a few miles south of the settlement, John H. Barham (for whom the present-day Barham Drive is named) founded the first town in the area, originally situated on the southeast corner of what are now Rancho Santa Fe Road and San Marcos Boulevard. By 1884, the town of Barham had a post office, blacksmith, feed store and weekly newspaper. In 1887, the San Marcos Land Company bought almost all of the San Marcos land formerly owned by the Couts family and promptly divided the land into tracts. Soon the hills began attracting home-seekers.

The original town of San Marcos was about a mile north of Barham, at the intersection of what is now Grand Avenue and Rancho Santa Fe Road. In 1887, the Santa Fe Railroad announced that it was going to lay tracks going through the valley, but to the disappointment of the citizens, the tracks were laid one mile (1.6 km) from the center of the town. By 1896, San Marcos was a community with its own stores, post office, blacksmith, and railroad depot. The first school in the area, which was started in Barham in 1886, had been moved to San Marcos three years later, as Barham was fading due to its distance from the railroad. To prevent San Marcos from suffering a similar fate, in 1903 the people of the town picked up their homes and moved a couple miles east along the railroad tracks to what now are Mission Road and Pico Avenue. By 1905, the town had every convenience, including rural mail delivery and telephone service. Later that same year, the Richland School (now a wedding chapel on Woodland Parkway) was built, becoming the second school in San Marcos. The main business in San Marcos in the 19th and early 20th centuries was farming. In the mid-20th century, dairies and poultry production became a big part of the business in the town.

San Marcos experienced a period of growth from 1956 onward, when the first water from the Colorado River arrived. Several small businesses were founded and the population rapidly increased to 2,500. San Marcos became an incorporated city on January 28, 1963. In the 1970s, San Marcos was flourishing as the third fastest-growing city in the state, and had a population of 17,479 by 1980. The population continued to boom during succeeding decades, surpassing 30,000 in 1990 and nearing 100,000 by 2020.

== Geography ==
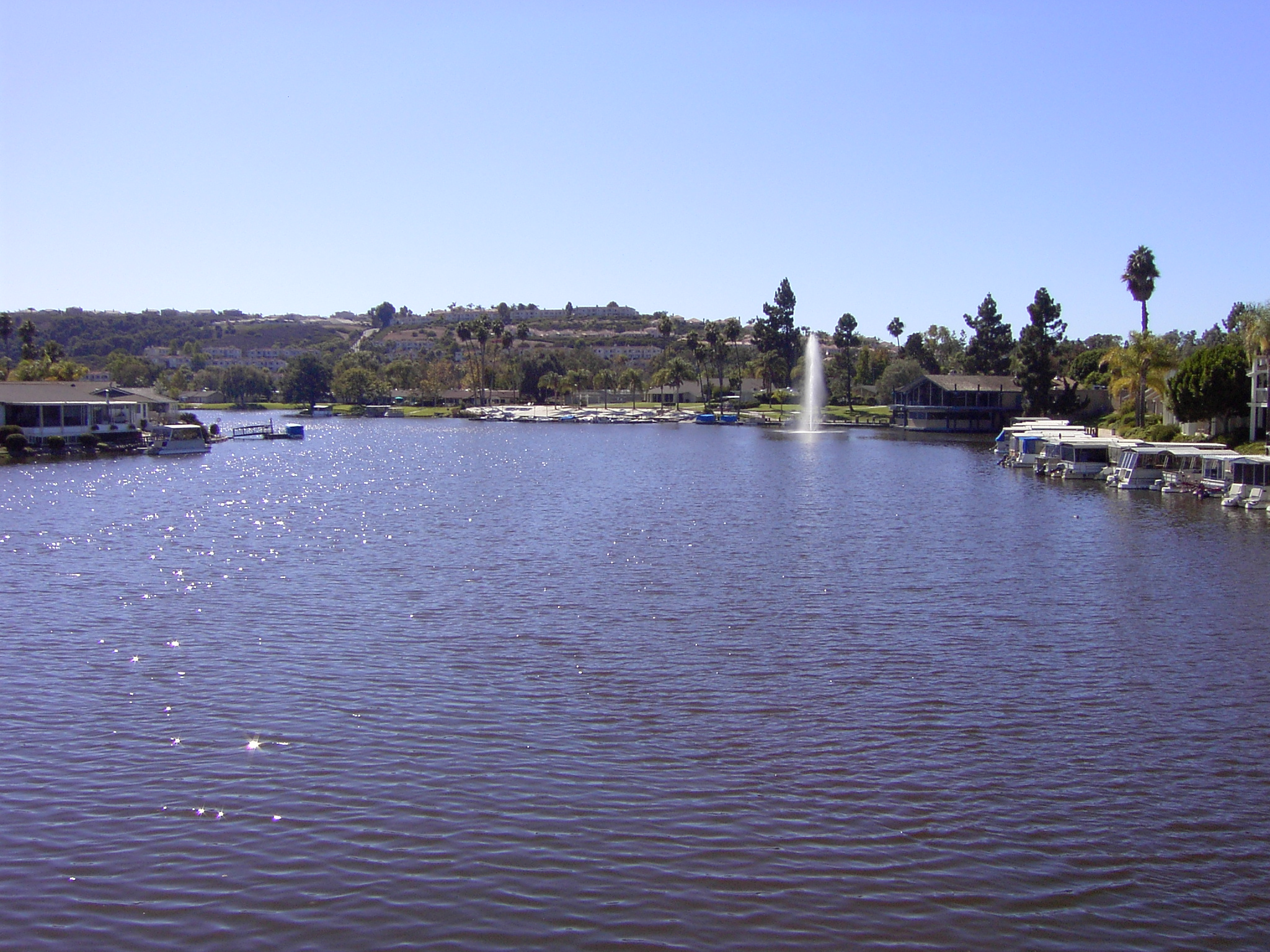
Lake San Marcos

According to the United States Census Bureau, the city has a total area of 24.4 square miles (63 km^{2}). 24.4 square miles (63 km^{2}) of it is land and 0.02 square miles (0.052 km^{2}) of it (0.08%) is water. Due to the moderating influence of the nearby Pacific, temperatures rarely fall below freezing in winter and above 100 °F (38 °C). in summer. Like most of coastal San Diego County, cool overcast from the Pacific is common in May and June ("May gray", "June gloom"). July through September are usually the warmest months, although hot and dry Santa Ana winds can strike any month (most commonly August) and raise risks of severe wildfires. Most of the rain falls between November and March, averaging about 13 inches (330 mm) per year, with up to 20 inches (510 mm) falling in the San Marcos Hills.

=== Neighborhoods ===
- Buenavida
- Coronado Hills
- Creek District
- Discovery Hills
- Discovery Meadows
- Grandon Estates
- Lake San Marcos (unincorporated)
- Old Creek Ranch
- Rancho Coronado/Rancho Tesoro
- Rancho Dorado
- Rancho Santalina
- Rancho Tesoro
- Richland
- Richmar
- Rock Springs/Bennett District
- Sage Canyon
- San Elijo Hills
- Santa Fe Hills
- Stone Canyon
- Twin Oaks Valley
- Village O
- University District/North City

== Demographics ==
Historical population
Census	Pop.	Note	%±
1970	3,896		—
1980	17,479		348.6%
1990	38,974		123.0%
2000	54,977		41.1%
2010	83,781		52.4%
2020	94,833		13.2%
U.S. Decennial Census; 1860–1870 1880-1890; 1900 1910 1920; 1930 1940 1950; 1960 1970 1980; 1990 2000 2010; 2020

=== Racial and ethnic composition ===
San Marcos city, California – Racial and ethnic composition Note: the US Census treats Hispanic/Latino as an ethnic category. This table excludes Latinos from the racial categories and assigns them to a separate category. Hispanics/Latinos may be of any race.
Race / Ethnicity (NH = Non-Hispanic)	Pop 2000	Pop 2010	Pop 2020	% 2000	% 2010	% 2020
White alone (NH)	29,617	40,736	41,989	53.87%	48.62%	44.28%
Black or African American alone (NH)	1,001	1,756	1,898	1.82%	2.10%	2.00%
Native American or Alaska Native alone (NH)	214	255	189	0.39%	0.30%	0.20%
Asian alone (NH)	2,503	7,363	10,185	4.55%	8.79%	10.74%
Native Hawaiian or Pacific Islander alone (NH)	119	289	253	0.22%	0.34%	0.27%
Other race alone (NH)	40	196	525	0.07%	0.23%	0.55%
Mixed race or Multiracial (NH)	1,212	2,489	4,916	2.20%	2.97%	5.18%
Hispanic or Latino (any race)	20,271	30,697	34,878	36.87%	36.64%	36.78%
Total	54,977	83,781	94,833	100.00%	100.00%	100.00%

=== 2020 census ===
As of the 2020 census, San Marcos had a population of 94,833 and a population density of 3,893.8 inhabitants per square mile (1,503.4/km^{2}).

The racial makeup of San Marcos was 50.8% White, 2.2% African American, 1.2% Native American, 11.0% Asian, 0.3% Pacific Islander, 18.4% from other races, and 16.0% from two or more races. Hispanic or Latino residents of any race were 36.8% of the population.

The census reported that 97.6% of the population lived in households, 2.2% lived in non-institutionalized group quarters, and 0.1% were institutionalized. Of residents, 99.7% lived in urban areas and 0.3% lived in rural areas.

There were 30,511 households, of which 42.3% included children under the age of 18. Of all households, 55.3% were married-couple households, 5.9% were cohabiting couple households, 24.4% had a female householder with no spouse or partner present, and 14.5% had a male householder with no spouse or partner present. About 17.7% of households were one-person households, and 8.4% had someone living alone who was 65 years of age or older. The average household size was 3.03. There were 22,859 families (74.9% of all households).

The age distribution was 25.5% under the age of 18, 11.6% aged 18 to 24, 26.2% aged 25 to 44, 23.8% aged 45 to 64, and 12.9% aged 65 or older. The median age was 35.6 years. For every 100 females, there were 93.9 males, and for every 100 females age 18 and over there were 90.8 males age 18 and over.

There were 31,724 housing units at an average density of 1,302.6 units per square mile (502.9 units/km^{2}), of which 30,511 (96.2%) were occupied. Of occupied units, 60.9% were owner-occupied and 39.1% were renter-occupied. Of all housing units, 3.8% were vacant. The homeowner vacancy rate was 0.6%, and the rental vacancy rate was 4.7%.

=== 2023 ACS 5-year estimate ===
In 2023, the US Census Bureau estimated that the median household income was $105,286, and the per capita income was $44,376. About 7.4% of families and 10.2% of the population were below the poverty line.

=== 2010 census ===
The 2010 United States census reported that San Marcos had a population of 83,781. The population density was 3,435.1 inhabitants per square mile (1,326.3/km^{2}). The racial makeup of San Marcos was 53,235 (63.5%) White, 1,967 (2.3%) African American, 591 (0.7%) Native American, 7,518 (9.0%) Asian, 322 (0.4%) Pacific Islander, 15,853 (18.9%) from other races, and 4,295 (5.1%) from two or more races. Hispanic or Latino of any race were 30,697 persons (36.6%).

The Census reported that 82,937 people (99.0% of the population) lived in households, 736 (0.9%) lived in non-institutionalized group quarters, and 108 (0.1%) were institutionalized.

There were 27,202 households, out of which 11,724 (43.1%) had children under the age of 18 living in them, 15,242 (56.0%) were opposite-sex married couples living together, 3,056 (11.2%) had a female householder with no husband present, 1,513 (5.6%) had a male householder with no wife present. There were 1,372 (5.0%) unmarried opposite-sex partnerships, and 186 (0.7%) same-sex married couples or partnerships; 5,168 households (19.0%) were made up of individuals, and 2,370 (8.7%) had someone living alone who was 65 years of age or older. The average household size was 3.05. There were 19,811 families (72.8% of all households); the average family size was 3.49.

The population was spread out, with 23,287 people (27.8%) under the age of 18, 9,215 people (11.0%) aged 18 to 24, 25,237 people (30.1%) aged 25 to 44, 17,515 people (20.9%) aged 45 to 64, and 8,527 people (10.2%) who were 65 years of age or older. The median age was 32.9 years. For every 100 females, there were 95.6 males. For every 100 females age 18 and over, there were 92.6 males.

There were 28,641 housing units at an average density of 1,174.3 units per square mile (453.4 units/km^{2}), of which 17,094 (62.8%) were owner-occupied, and 10,108 (37.2%) were occupied by renters. The homeowner vacancy rate was 2.1%; the rental vacancy rate was 5.7%. 50,570 people (60.4% of the population) lived in owner-occupied housing units and 32,367 people (38.6%) lived in rental housing units.

=== Ethnic/cultural diversity ===
San Marcos has a diversity of races and ethnic groups common in suburban communities (not ranked, but for example): African Americans, Irish, Italian, Portuguese, German, Polish, Russian, Armenian, Iranian, Indian, Vietnamese, Chinese, Japanese, Filipino, Mexican, Salvadorian, Argentine, Cuban, Puerto Rican, Hawaiian, Jewish, and Samoan.

== Economy ==
=== Top employers ===
According to the city's 2021 Annual Comprehensive Financial Report, the top 10 employers in the city are:

Rank	Employer	# of Employees	% of total employment
1	San Marcos Unified School District	2,464	5.33%
2	California State University San Marcos	1,800	3.89%
3	Palomar College	1,769	3.82%
4	Hunter Industries	815	1.76%
5	United Parcel Service	551	1.19%
6	So. CA Permanente Med Group	449	0.97%
7	Costco Wholesale	390	0.84%
8	TrueCare	250	0.54%
9	Lusardi Construction Co.	250	0.54%
10	Wal-Mart	216	0.47%

== Arts and culture ==
An illuminated cross on a hill above Lake San Marcos that is visible at night from many parts of the city has been a community landmark for decades. Other landmarks include the Williams Barn (or "Red Barn"), a community center and reception hall built in 1952 to resemble a "big red barn". It is in Walnut Grove Park in Twin Oaks, along with a collection of historic houses from around the city maintained by the San Marcos Historical Society.

== Government ==
San Marcos uses a council-manager system of government with a separately elected mayor. The city council consists of the mayor and four other members. The mayor is elected at-large every four years, while the other council members are elected individually to represent one of four districts in the city. They also serve four-year terms. Formerly, these members were elected at-large, with all candidates appearing on a single slate and the top four vote-getters being declared elected. But in 2018, the city was divided into four districts, each electing a separate council member. Their terms are staggered, so that members from districts 1 and 2 are elected one year, and those from districts 3 and 4 are voted in two years later. As of December 2024, the mayor is Rebecca Jones, the mayor Pro Tem is Mike Sannella (D2), and the other councilmembers are Maria Nuñez (D1), Danielle LeBlang (D3) and Ed Musgrove (D4).

As of September 2023, the city manager is Michelle Bender.

At the state level, San Marcos is in the 76th Assembly district, represented by Democrat Darshana Patel, and the 40th senatorial district, represented by Republican Brian Jones. The city is represented by San Marcos' former mayor, Jim Desmond, in the 5th district of the County Board of Supervisors.

=== Federal representation ===
With respect to the United States House of Representatives, San Marcos is in California's 50th congressional district, represented by Democrat Scott Peters.

== Education ==
=== San Marcos Unified School District ===
The San Marcos Unified School District is one of San Diego County's largest school districts and includes 20 schools with diverse educational programs from kindergarten through adult education students. SMUSD has 11 elementary schools, 3 middle schools (San Elijo Hills, Woodland Park and San Marcos middle schools), 2 K-8 school (Double Peak, La Mirada Academy K-8), 2 comprehensive high schools (San Marcos High School and Mission Hills High School), 1 charter high school, 1 independent study high school, 1 continuation school, and 1 adult school. SMUSD serves more than 21,000 students in San Marcos, as well as sections of Vista, Escondido, Carlsbad and Encinitas, and some unincorporated areas of the county, such as Buena, Twin Oaks Valley, Deer Springs, Lake San Marcos, Harmony Grove, and Elfin Forrest. San Marcos Adult School was established in 1993 by the San Marcos Unified School District. It provides adult education services in the City of San Marcos and its surrounding communities. The adult school campus is on the grounds of Twin Oaks High School, in Twin Oaks Valley. San Marcos Adult School offers adult education courses for in high school diploma, GED, HISET, adult basic education, and English as a Second Language. It works with Palomar College and other local adult schools to connect students with post-secondary education and training. San Marcos Adult School is a member of the Education to Career Network of North San Diego County. ETCN is one of 71 Consortiums in California and is funded by the California Adult Education Program.

=== High Tech High, Middle and Elementary, North County ===
High Tech High, Middle and Elementary are all charter schools in San Marcos. High Tech High, which started with a single school in 2000, uses small-school settings, where students learn through projects, internships and interaction with professionals. It is across the street from San Marcos High School on San Marcos Boulevard.

=== Palomar College ===
The main 200-acre (0.81 km^{2}) campus of Palomar College is in northern San Marcos. It is a public two-year community college and part of the California Community Colleges system. It enrolls about 30,000 full-time and part-time students. Palomar offers more than 250 associate degree and certificate programs. California residents are charged $46 per unit.

A giant letter P (for "Palomar") on the hillside above campus is a San Marcos landmark, visible miles away.

=== California State University ===
Cal State San Marcos is a campus in the California State University system. It was founded in 1989 and built on a 304-acre (1.23 km^{2}) hillside in southeastern San Marcos. It enrolls about 14,000 students and offers 44 undergraduate programs, 10 graduate programs and 1 Doctorate in Education in three colleges and one nursing school.

== Infrastructure ==
=== Transportation ===
==== Roads and highways ====
State Route 78 provides freeway access to San Marcos, with six interchanges serving the city. Several roads in San Marcos are county routes that connect the city with other nearby cities including Vista, Carlsbad and Escondido, such as Rancho Santa Fe Road (CR S10), San Marcos Boulevard and Twin Oaks Valley Road (CR S12), and Mission Road (CR S14).

==== Public transportation ====
SPRINTER light rail service, operated by the North County Transit District (NCTD), is available in San Marcos, with stops at Palomar College, San Marcos Civic Center, Cal State San Marcos, and Nordahl Road. BREEZE buses, also operated by NCTD, serve the city using lines 304, 305, 347, 353, 445, and 604.

== Notable people ==
- Joe Barton, soccer player
- Terrell Burgess, National Football League (NFL) player
- Greg Evans, cartoonist and creator of Luann
- Liliana Mumy, actress
- Fred Warner, professional football player
- Nia Jax, professional wrestler with WWE

== See also ==
- List of cities and towns in California
