= North County Transit District =

Public transportation agency in Northern San Diego County, California

North County Transit – San Diego Railroad

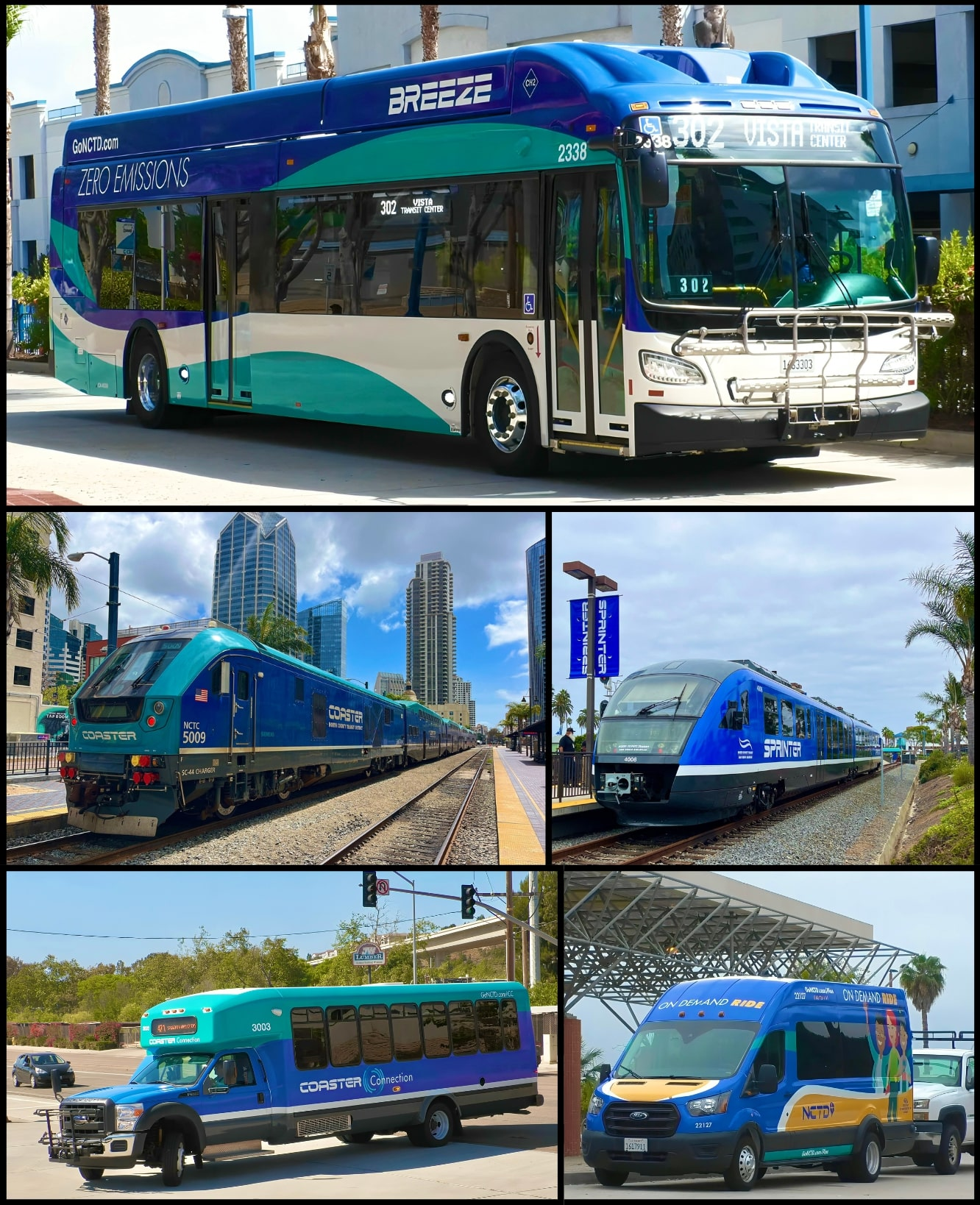
- Gallery of NCTD services

Overview
- Locale: Northern San Diego County, California
- Transit type: Buses, commuter rail, light rail, paratransit
- Number of lines: 33 bus routes; 1 light rail line; 1 commuter rail line
- Number of stations: 15 light rail stations 8 commuter rail stations
- Daily ridership: 27,500 (weekdays, Q2 2026)
- Annual ridership: 8,324,500 (2025)
- Chief executive: Shawn M. Donaghy
- Headquarters: Oceanside, CA
- Website: gonctd.com

Operation
- Began operation: September 30, 1975; 51 years ago

The North County Transit District (NCTD), branded as North County Transit – San Diego Railroad, is the agency responsible for public transportation in Northern San Diego County, California. The agency manages the COASTER commuter rail service between Oceanside and San Diego, the SPRINTER hybrid rail service between Escondido and Oceanside, the BREEZE transit bus service, LIFT paratransit service, FLEX, and NCTD+ on-demand services.

Established on September 20, 1975, as the North County Transit Development Board, and later took the name North County Transit District (NCTD). The agency's jurisdiction includes Oceanside, Carlsbad, San Marcos, Vista, Escondido, Fallbrook, Pauma, Valley Center, San Dieguito, and Ramona. The Board would serve as the operator of bus service within the North County area, absorbing the municipal bus systems of Escondido and Oceanside.

NCTD owns 62 miles (100 km) of mainline railroad track (the Surf Line) from the Orange County/San Diego County line to Santa Fe Depot (used by COASTER, Metrolink, and Pacific Surfliner passenger trains along with BNSF Railway freight trains) along with the 22-mile (35 km) Escondido Subdivision (used by the SPRINTER and BNSF freight trains).

NCTD works closely with the San Diego Metropolitan Transit System (MTS), which operates public transit services in Southern San Diego County, and the San Diego Association of Governments (SANDAG), which plans, develops, and constructs transit projects for both NCTD and MTS.

As of 2025, NCTD provides 8,324,500 passenger trips per year, or about 27,500 per weekday as of the second quarter of 2026. NCTD's geographic area is approximately 1,020 square miles (2,600 km^{2}) with an approximate population of 842,000 people.

== History ==
The North San Diego County Transit Development Board (NSDCTDB) was established in 1976 by California Senate Bill No. 802 to plan, construct, and operate public transit in North San Diego County. The Board quickly acquired the municipal transit systems operated by the cities of Escondido and Oceanside. The Board also designed a regional transit system consisting of local and regional corridor routes to serve the transportation needs of North San Diego County.

In 1982, planning began for the Coast Express Rail (COASTER) commuter rail service. On June 2, 1994, the Board created a non-profit corporation called the San Diego Northern Railway (SDNR) to maintain, enhance, and operate the COASTER. SDNR purchased the tracks to be used by the COASTER from the Atchison, Topeka and Santa Fe Railway in 1994; SDNR was later dissolved in 2002. On February 27, 1995, COASTER service commenced.

Older NCTD logo.

On January 1, 2003, Senate Bill 1703 was enacted, transferring responsibility for future transit planning, programming, development, and construction to the San Diego Association of Governments (SANDAG), San Diego's regional planning agency. In 2005, the State Legislature changed NSDCTDB's name to the North County Transit District (NCTD).

In March 2008, after many years of planning, the SPRINTER hybrid rail service began service. FLEX on-demand service began in 2011.

In fiscal year 2009, NCTD projected annual operating deficits of more than $24 million by 2014. In response, NCTD made proactive changes to maintain transit services and related jobs, including reducing staff and renegotiating and restructuring various contracts. These changes closed a five-year, $80 million budget gap. The new business model also allowed NCTD to lower fares, increase service and ridership, and grow its financial reserves.

NCTD relies on public funding. In 1987, voters approved the Proposition A TransNet Ordinance, which provided funding for future transit projects and improvements to the existing system. In November 2004, voters approved a 40-year extension of the TransNet sales tax, which will allow NCTD to continue to operate service for many years.

In August 2018, NCTD announced that they were seeking public opinions and input on a re-brand of the agency. This included a new COASTER paint livery.

== Services ==
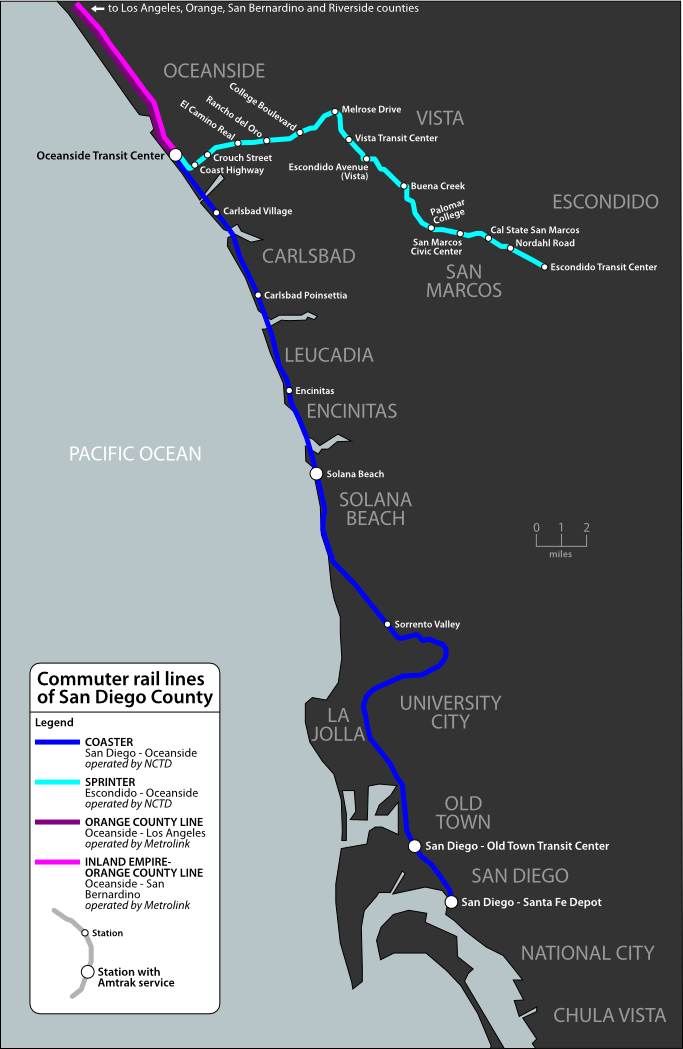
Map of commuter rail lines in San Diego County

Interactive map of COASTER and SPRINTER

NCTD provides public transit in North San Diego County, from La Jolla and the Pacific Ocean, east to Escondido and Ramona, and from Oceanside and the Orange County border south through Del Mar to UCSD and La Jolla and University Town Center, with connections extending to downtown San Diego. NCTD offers the following services:

- BREEZE – Fixed-route bus services.
- COASTER – Commuter rail service from Oceanside to downtown San Diego.
- SPRINTER – Hybrid rail service from Escondido to Oceanside.
- LIFT – Paratransit service for those with disabilities who are unable to use the accessible fixed-route system.
- FLEX – On-demand service in Oceanside and Sorrento Valley.

=== BREEZE routes ===
Route	Terminals		Via
101	Oceanside; Oceanside Transit Center	San Diego; UTC Transit Center	Coast Highway 101
302	Oceanside; Oceanside Transit Center	Vista; Vista Transit Center	Vista Way
303	Oceanside; Oceanside Transit Center	Vista; Vista Transit Center	Mission and Santa Fe Avenues
304	San Marcos; Palomar College Transit Center	Encinitas; Encinitas Station	Rancho Santa Fe Road
305	Vista; Vista Transit Center	Escondido; Escondido Transit Center	Mission Road, Santa Fe Avenue
306	Vista; Vista Transit Center	Fallbrook; Ivy Street & Main Avenue	Mission Road
308	Escondido; Escondido Transit Center	Solana Beach; Plaza Street & Coast Highway 101	Via De La Valle, Del Dios Road
309	Oceanside; San Luis Rey Transit Center	Encinitas; Encinitas Station	El Camino Real
311	Oceanside; San Luis Rey Transit Center	Oceanside; MiraCosta College	Douglas Drive
313	Oceanside; Oceanside Transit Center	Oceanside; San Luis Rey Transit Center	Mesa Drive
315	Carlsbad; Carlsbad Village Station	Camp Pendleton; Vandegrift Boulevard & 16th Street	Vandegrift Boulevard
318	Oceanside; Oceanside Transit Center	Vista; Vista Transit Center	Oceanside Boulevard, Bobier Drive
325	Carlsbad; Carlsbad Village Station	Oceanside; Oceanside Boulevard & Avenida Del Oro	Rancho Del Oro Road
332	Vista; Vista Transit Center	Vista; Buena Creek Station	Melrose Drive
347	San Marcos; Palomar College Transit Center	San Marcos; Cal State San Marcos Station	San Marcos Boulevard
350	Escondido; Escondido Transit Center	Escondido; Del Lago Transit Station	Escondido Boulevard
351 (Loop)	Escondido; Escondido Transit Center		Grand and Washington Avenues
352 (Loop)	Escondido; Escondido Transit Center		Washington and Grand Avenues
353	Escondido; Escondido Transit Center	San Marcos; Avenida Ricardo & Center Drive	Citracado Parkway
354	Escondido; Escondido Transit Center	Escondido; Orange Glen High School	Mission and Lincoln Avenues
355 (Loop)	Escondido; Escondido Transit Center		El Norte and Valley Parkways
356 (Loop)	Escondido; Escondido Transit Center		Morning View Drive, El Norte Parkway, Escondido Boulevard
357 (Loop)	Escondido; Escondido Transit Center		Valley and El Norte Parkways
358 (Loop)	Escondido; Escondido Transit Center		El Norte Parkway, Broadway
359 (Loop)	Escondido; Escondido Transit Center		Broadway, El Norte Parkway
388	Escondido; Escondido Transit Center	Pala; Pala Casino	SR 76, Valley Center Road, Valley Parkway
445	Carlsbad; Carlsbad Poinsettia Station	San Marcos; Palomar College Transit Center	Palomar Airport Road
604	San Marcos; Palomar College Transit Center	Encinitas; Encinitas Station	Rancho Santa Fe Road
608	Escondido; Escondido Transit Center	Escondido; Citracado Parkway & Scenic Trail Way	Valley Parkway
609	Carlsbad; El Camino Real & Oilvenhain Rd	Carlsbad; Cannon Road & College Bouleavrd	El Camino Real
632	Vista; Vista Transit Center	Vista; Rancho Buena Vista High School	Melrose Drive
651 (Loop)	Escondido; Escondido Transit Center		Grand and Washington Avenues
652 (Loop)	Escondido; Escondido Transit Center		Washington and Grand Avenues

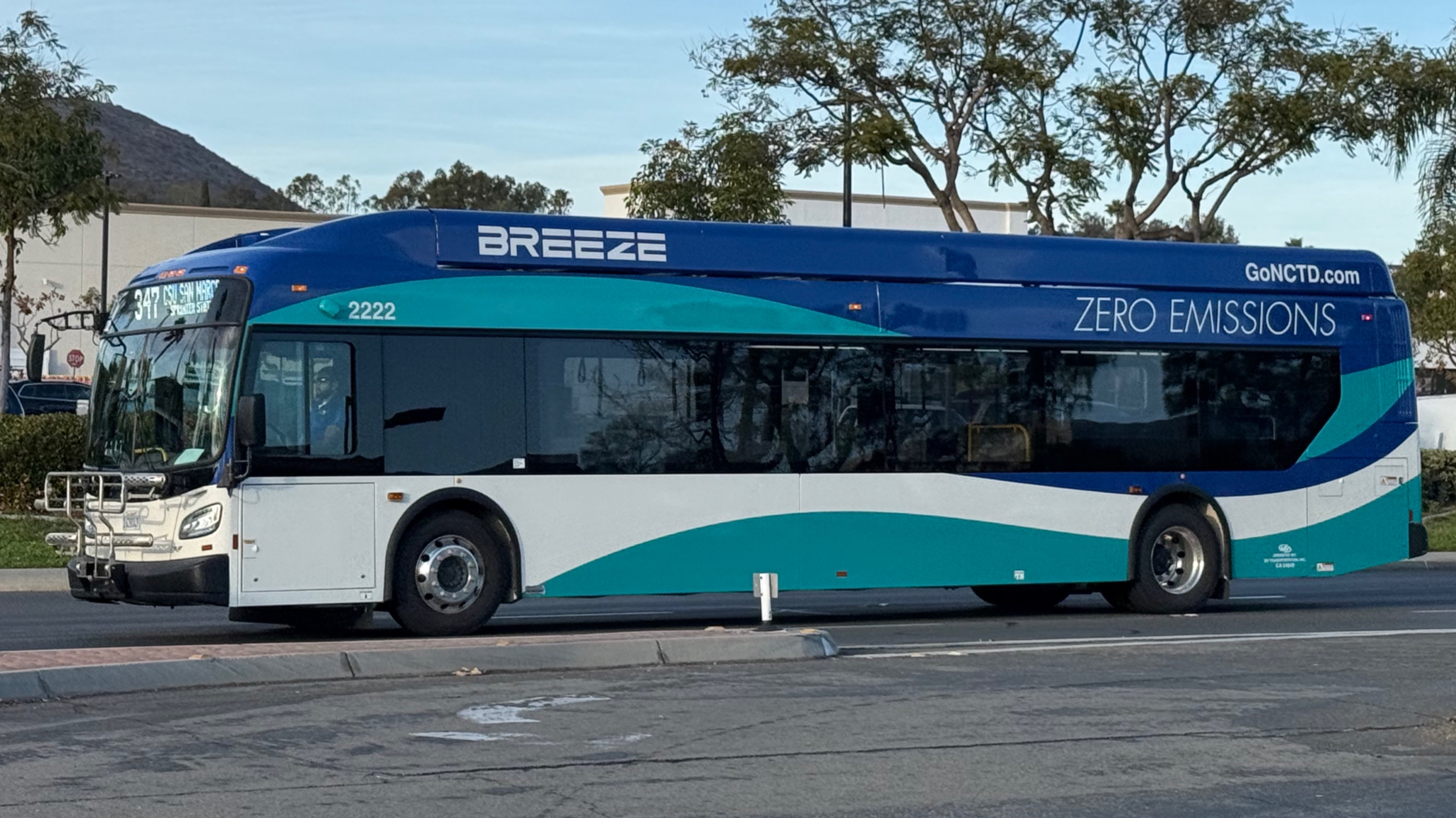
A battery-electric BREEZE bus on Route 347 seen on San Marcos Boulevard

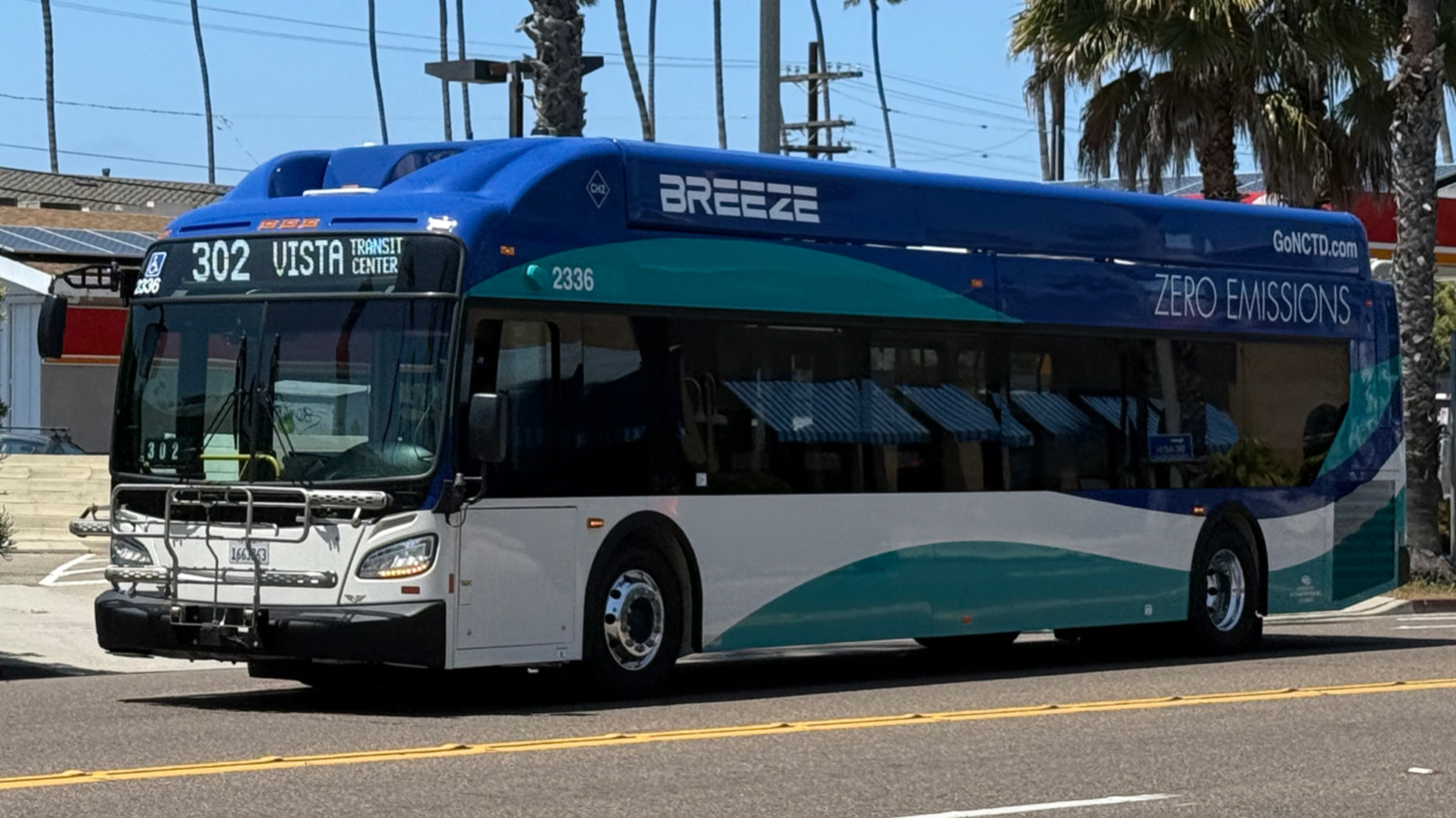
A hydrogen-electric BREEZE bus on Route 302 seen on Coast Highway

The BREEZE Bus Service serves as the main form of public road transportation for residents of North San Diego County. BREEZE service began in 1976 when NCTD acquired the municipal bus systems serving Escondido and Oceanside.

The annual ridership of BREEZE buses is 7.9 million people, with an average weekday ridership of 25,800 people. More than 2,600 bus stops and 9 transit centers service the BREEZE buses. As of April 2025, the fleet comprises 166 vehicles, including 144 compressed natural gas (CNG) buses.

In June 2023, NCTD was awarded $29 million to order 23 hydrogen-electric buses that will help the agency continue to reach its goal of transforming the entire BREEZE fleet to zero-emissions by 2040. Beginning in 2025, exactly one quarter of BREEZE's fleet will be operated by zero-emission buses; 35 hydrogen-electric buses and 6 battery-electric buses.

On October 29, 2024, NCTD officially broke ground on a new hydrogen fueling station at BREEZE's main facility in Oceanside to support hydrogen-electric buses. On that same day, 12 brand new XHE40 buses from New Flyer were delivered to NCTD. The total cost of the hydrogen fueling station will be around $8 million. U.S. Representative Mike Levin secured $1.72 million for the project through the Fiscal Year 2022 federal appropriations bill, while the California Energy Commission funded the station with $6 million of their own. Construction of the hydrogen fueling station is expected to be completed in the summer of 2025.

In November 2009, NCTD approved outsourcing all bus and rail operations effective July 1, 2010, to First Transit. The agency anticipated saving $70 million over seven years with the move. Fleet and facility operators remained NCTD employees until their contracts expired June 30, 2011. On June 29, 2025, NCTD brought all functional contracted bus operations back in house, marking the first time in the agency's history that all Bus and Rail operations were managed directly by the authority since insourcing NCTD's rail in 2022.

As of February 2026, NCTD offers 34 BREEZE bus routes plus 5 FLEX zones.

=== SPRINTER hybrid rail ===
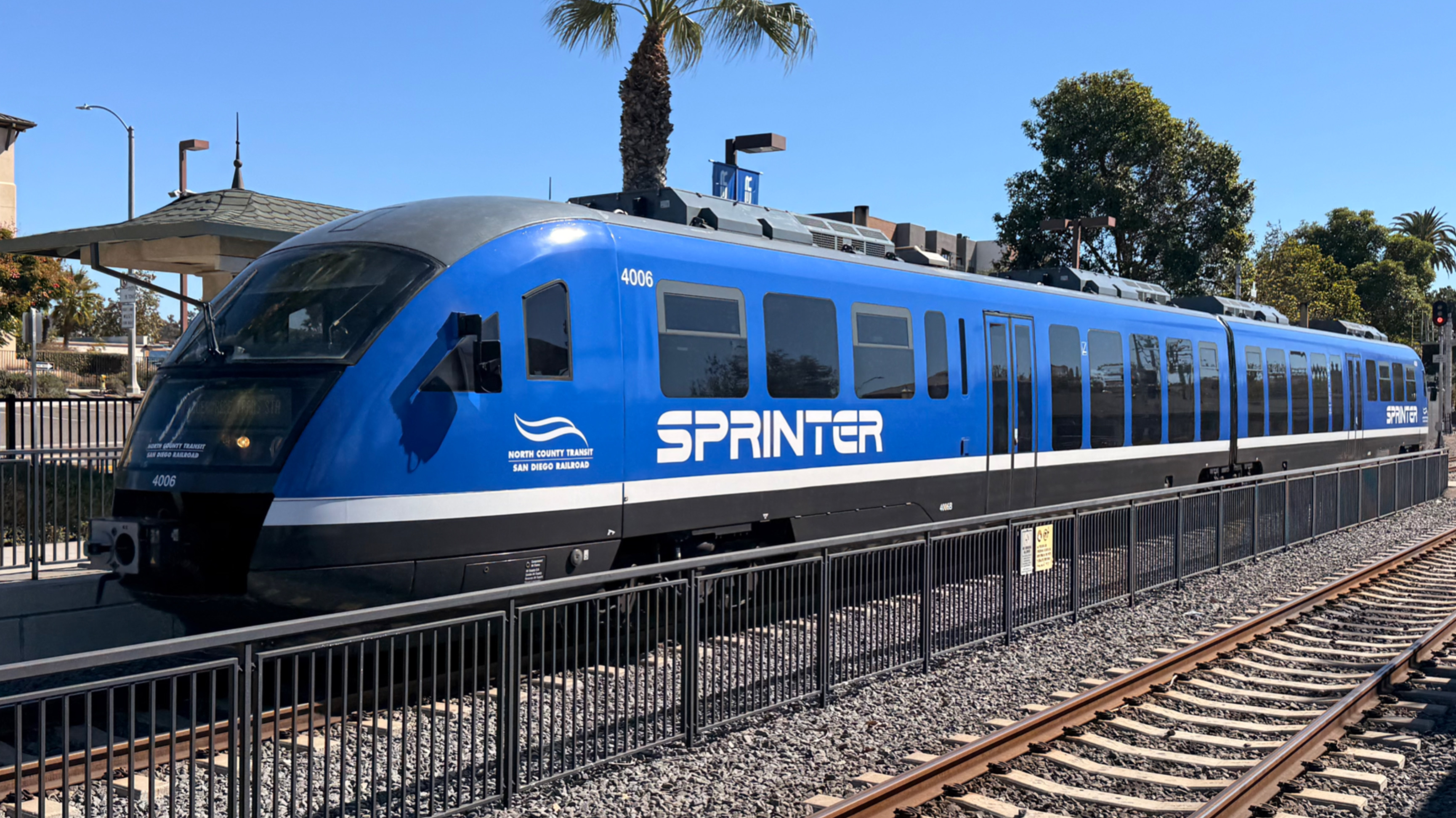
A SPRINTER DMU arriving at the Vista Transit Center

SPRINTER is a 22-mile (35 km) hybrid rail line that runs east and west between Escondido and Oceanside. A total of 455 trains run every week.

The SPRINTER's first day of service was March 9, 2008. The annual ridership was 2.5 million people in 2015, with an average weekday ridership of 8,300 people. Fifteen stations are served by the Sprinter route. SPRINTER equipment includes 12 Siemens Desiro diesel multiple unit passenger trains. NCTD also owns a maintenance facility and rail yard for their Sprinter service in Escondido, between Escondido Transit Center and Nordahl Road station.

=== COASTER commuter rail ===
The COASTER is a 41-mile (66 km) commuter rail service that runs north and south between Oceanside and Santa Fe Depot in Downtown San Diego. A total of 192 trains run every week, with expanded service offered and additional trains scheduled for special events as needed.

The COASTER's first day of service was February 27, 1995. The annual ridership is 993,000 people, with an average weekday ridership of 2,500 people in 2025. The COASTER route serves 8 stations on its route, including the termini at Oceanside and Santa Fe Depot in downtown San Diego. Currently, COASTER equipment consists of 9 locomotives and 34 passenger cars.

The North County Transit District owns and maintains two rail yards for their COASTER commuter rail service. The first yard is the main maintenance and servicing facility located north of Oceanside at Stuart Mesa on Camp Pendleton, and it is shared with Metrolink and the BNSF Railway's local freight trains (formerly the Pacific Sun Railroad). The second yard is shared with the San Diego Trolley at 12th & Imperial Transit Center in Downtown San Diego; this rail yard stores trainsets during mid-days until they're ready to be used again for northbound services.

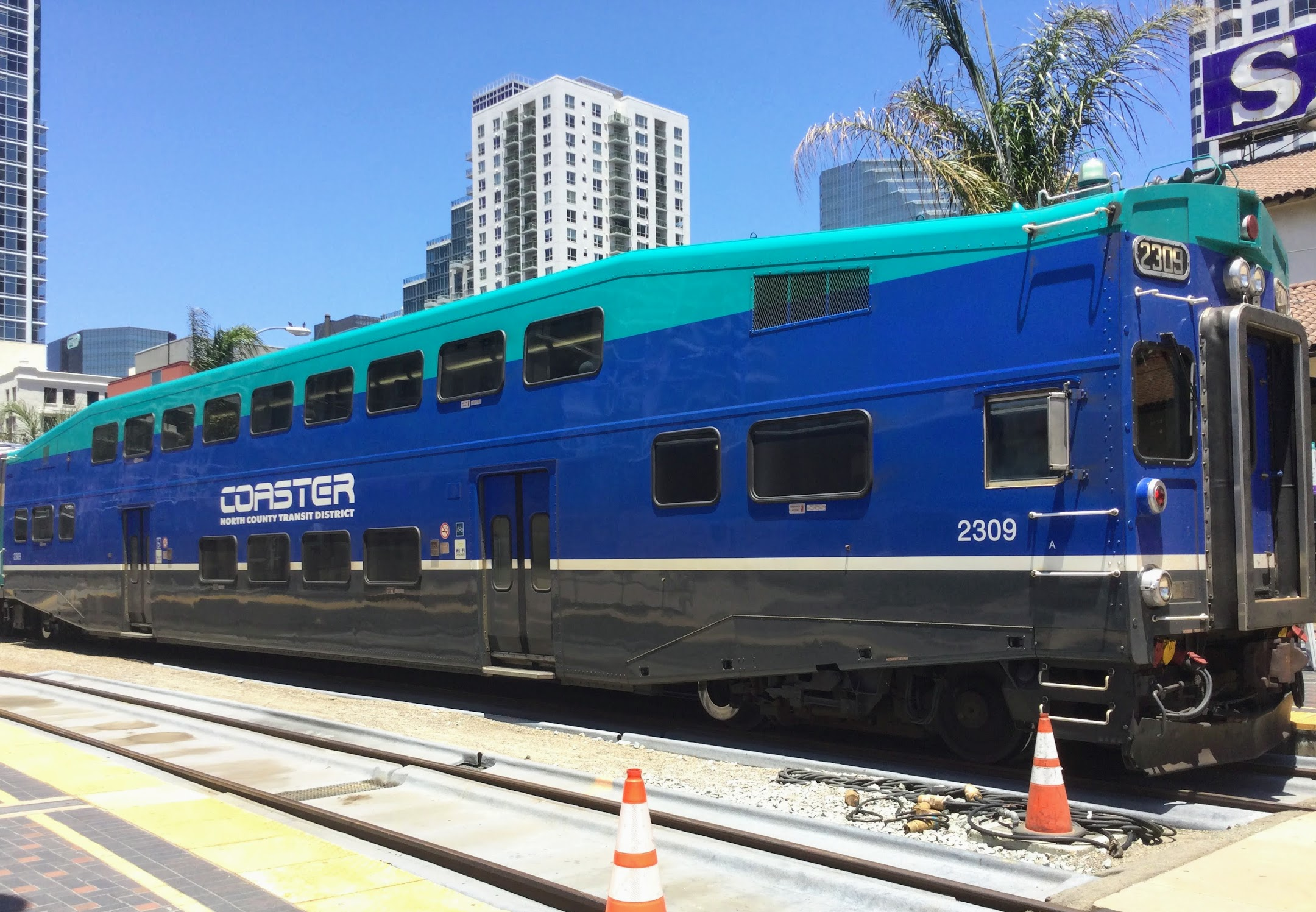
Left: A COASTER Bombardier BiLevel cab car at San Diego's Santa Fe Depot.

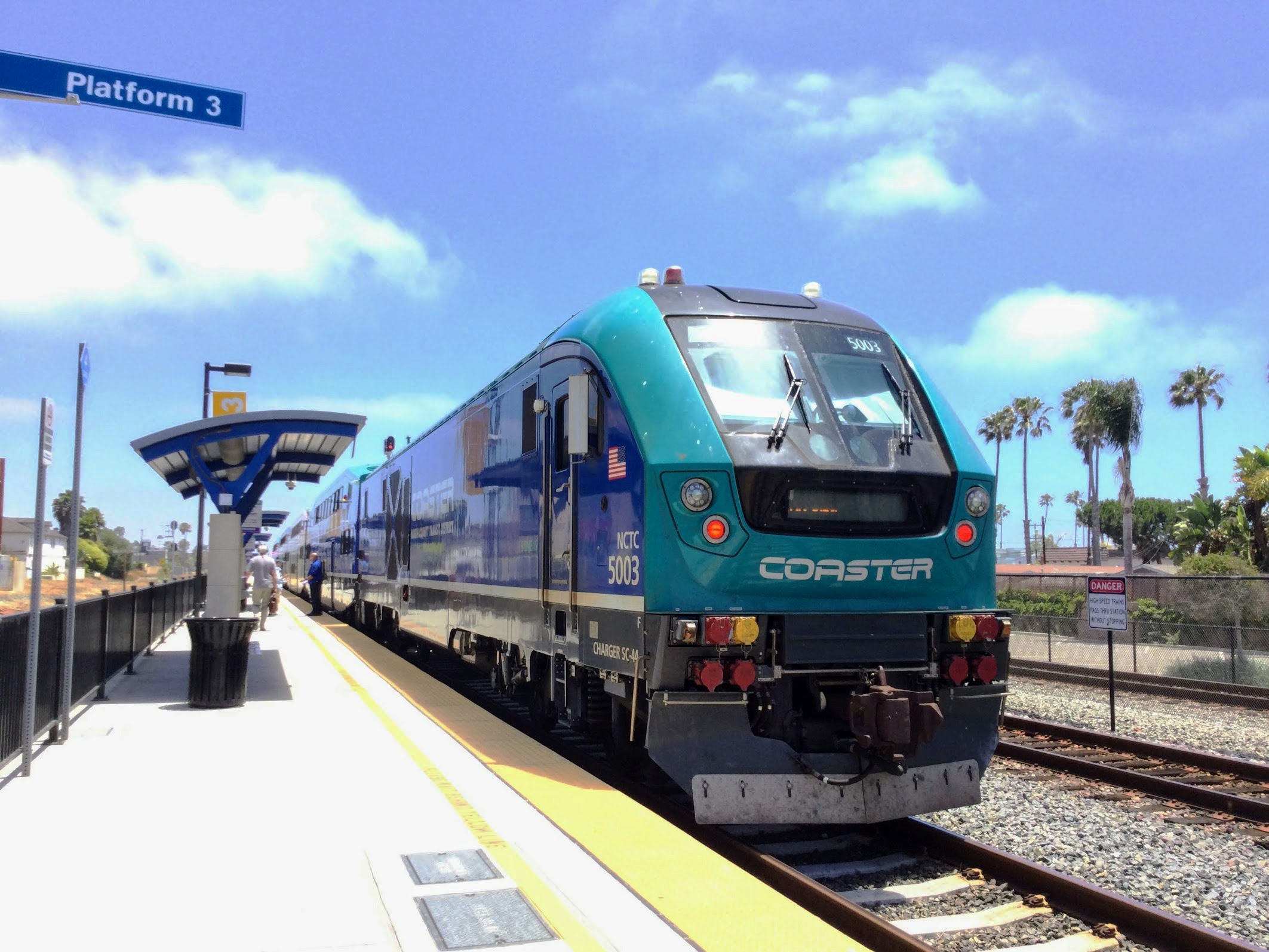
Right: A COASTER Siemens SC-44 Charger locomotive at Oceanside Transit Center.

=== LIFT paratransit service ===
LIFT vehicles provide origin-to-destination service for people with disabilities who are unable to use BREEZE buses due to their disability and have been certified for eligibility, as required by the Americans with Disabilities Act of 1990. Service is available for trips within ¾ mile of fixed bus routes.

The LIFT's first day of service was January 1, 1993. The American Logistics Company operates the LIFT.

=== FLEX on-demand service ===
FLEX is an on-demand service in parts of Oceanside and Ramona, where BREEZE service is not available. FLEX vehicles take passengers anywhere within the FLEX zone or to the nearest transfer point on the BREEZE, COASTER, or SPRINTER. The American Logistics Company operates the FLEX service.

Route	Terminals		Via
371	Escondido; Escondido Transit Center	Ramona; Ramona Station	San Pasqual Valley Road
392	Oceanside; Oceanside Transit Center	Camp Pendleton North; 14 Area	Vandegrift Boulevard
395	Oceanside; Oceanside Transit Center	Camp San Onofre	Stuart Mesa Road, Las Pulgas Canyon Road, Basilone Road

==== FLEX COASTER Connection ====
On June 10, 2024, NCTD launched five new weekday-only FLEX routes, known as the COASTER Connection. These routes connect the COASTER's Sorrento Valley station with nearby destinations. Four of the routes replaced the MTS's Sorrento Valley COASTER Connection (SVCC) routes, while a fifth (route 471) was a newly established route. However, Routes 471, 472, and 478 were eliminated in February 2026 due to not meeting the NCTD Service Design Guidelines.

Route	Terminals	Via	Predecessor under MTS	Annual ridership under MTS (FY 2023)
473	San Diego; Sorrento Valley station	Sorrento Valley Rd	973	7,548
479	San Diego; Sorrento Valley station	Genesee Ave	974	6,968
479	San Diego; Sorrento Valley station	Genesee Ave	979	6,295

== Organization, policies, and initiatives ==
A board of directors governs NCTD. The board includes members from Carlsbad, Del Mar, Encinitas, Escondido, Oceanside, Solana Beach, San Marcos, Vista, and the San Diego County Board of Supervisors.

=== Green initiatives ===
NCTD has implemented cutting-edge green initiatives and sustainability programs that minimize the environmental impact of public transit. NCTD recently installed solar panels, saving the agency $1 million in energy costs over five years. NCTD has increased recycling and improved lighting and is using biodegradable cleaning supplies. In addition, NCTD has received grant funding to install electric smart car chargers in transit center parking lots. Additionally, all of NCTD's COASTER vehicles are Tier IV compliant, reducing emissions by nearly 90% compared to Tier I locomotives and are also significantly quieter. NCTD is also leading the way with a changeover to battery-electric and hydrogen fuel-cell vehicles in its bus fleet.

=== Contactless fare systems ===
All NCTD and related San Diego Metropolitan Transit System (MTS) services utilize the new Pronto contactless fare system introduced in September 2021 by INIT Systems and SANDAG; the Pronto system succeeded the first-generation Compass Card system." As a replacement for the original "Compass Card," the Pronto fare system allows for a tap-on, tap-off approach through the use of station validators in order to deduct the correct fare; additional measures may need to be taken depending on the service. General Pronto cards can be physically purchased at Pronto ticket vending machines within NCTD facilities, or in NCTD customer service centers; electronic versions can be purchased through the website or through the mobile applications.

Both NCTD and MTS services previously utilized the aforementioned contactless "Compass Card", made possible by Cubic Transportation Systems, Inc. The "Compass Card" allowed passengers from MTS and NCTD to store regional transit passes and cash value on a rewritable RFID card. Customers would have purchased passes and added cash value on the Internet or at any ticket vending machine. Prior to using a provided service, customers tapped their Compass Cards on the ticket validator located at the transit center or station. The LED display on the validator would then light up with lights resembling that of a stoplight, and the LCD showed text regarding the passenger's fare account. The new Pronto system now used expanded upon many of the design concepts previously employed with the Compass Card system.

== See also ==
- San Diego Public Transportation
- San Diego Metropolitan Transit System
