= Oceanside Transit Center =

Transit center in Oceanside, California, US

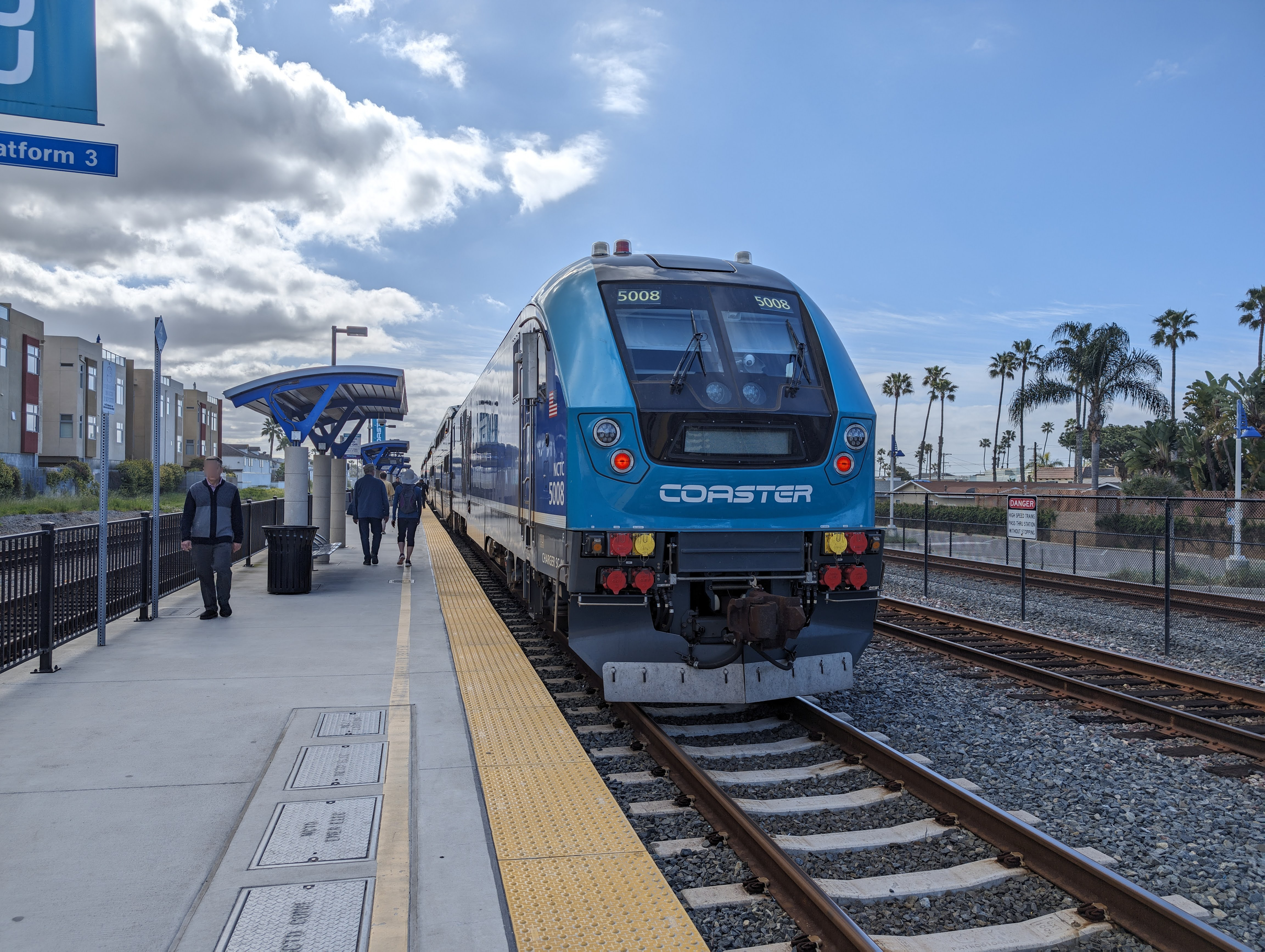
- COASTER train at Oceanside Transit Center

General information
- Other names: Oceanside Transit Center
- Location: 235 South Tremont Street; Oceanside, California; United States
- Coordinates: 33°11′31″N 117°22′46″W
- Owner: North County Transit District
- Lines: NCTD San Diego Subdivision; NCTD Escondido Subdivision
- Platforms: 3 side platforms (San Diego Subdivision); 1 island platform (Escondido Subdivision)
- Tracks: 3 (San Diego Subdivision); 2 (Escondido Subdivision)
- Connections: NCTD BREEZE: 101, 302, 303, 313, 318, FLEX 392, FLEX 395; Amtrak Thruway: 1; Greyhound Lines

Construction
- Parking: 1,261 spaces, 24 accessible spaces
- Cycle facilities: 16 rack spaces, 4 lockers
- Accessible: Yes

Other information
- Status: Staffed, station building with waiting room
- Station code: Amtrak: OSD
- Fare zone: 1 (COASTER)

History
- Opened: 1886
- Rebuilt: 1946, 1984

Passengers
- FY 2025: 211,534 annually (Amtrak)
- FY 2026: 223 weekday boardings (Metrolink)

Services
Preceding station	Amtrak	Following station
San Juan Capistrano toward San Luis Obispo	Pacific Surfliner	Solana Beach toward San Diego
San Clemente Pier (limited service) toward San Luis Obispo	Pacific Surfliner	Solana Beach toward San Diego
Preceding station	Metrolink	Following station
San Clemente toward San Bernardino–Downtown	Inland Empire–Orange County Line	Terminus
San Clemente Pier (weekends) toward San Bernardino–Downtown	Inland Empire–Orange County Line	Terminus
San Clemente toward L.A. Union Station	Orange County Line	Terminus
San Clemente Pier (weekends) toward L.A. Union Station	Orange County Line	Terminus
Preceding station	North County Transit District	Following station
Terminus	COASTER	Carlsbad Village toward Santa Fe Depot
Terminus	SPRINTER	Coast Highway toward Escondido
Former services
Preceding station	Atchison, Topeka and Santa Fe Railway	Following station
San Onofre toward Los Angeles	Surf Line	Encinitas toward San Diego
Las Flores Bypassed pre-1948 toward Los Angeles	Surf Line	Carlsbad 1887-1960 toward San Diego
Terminus	Oceanside – Fallbrook	Ysidora toward Fallbrook
Terminus	Escondido Branch	Falda toward Escondido
Location

Oceanside Transit Center is a major railway interchange in Oceanside, California, serving both intercity and suburban/commuter services. The station is used by Amtrak on the route of its Pacific Surfliner service between San Diego and San Luis Obispo. It is also a terminus for two different regional transit operators – Metrolink, the commuter rail operator for the Los Angeles area, has two of its services, the Orange County Line and Inland Empire–Orange County Line, that terminate at Oceanside (the only Metrolink station in San Diego County), while the North County Transit District (NCTD), the operator for most of the public transport in the North County, has its COASTER and SPRINTER services also terminating at Oceanside. Oceanside Transit Center is also served by Greyhound Lines and numerous NCTD BREEZE buses.

== History ==
Oceanside Transit Center was built in 1984, and serves as a replacement for a 1946-built Santa Fe Depot, which was torn down in 1988. The former station was itself a replacement for an 1886-built Santa Fe Depot. This station became one of the original 9 stations on Metrolink's Orange County Line when that line opened on March 28, 1994, and North County Transit District's COASTER commuter rail began serving this station when the line opened on February 27, 1995 and Metrolink's Inland Empire–Orange County Line began serving this station regularly in the early 2000s after serving the station on a temporary basis from that line's opening on October 2, 1995, until the early 2000s and North County Transit District's SPRINTER hybrid rail service began serving this station when it opened on March 9, 2008.

=== Expansion ===
To enhance the regional transit service, this station underwent a major expansion including building a third track and platform in the middle of the existing tracks, extending all platforms, and adding a passenger walkway. Construction on the project began in 2016, the third platform opened in May 2017, and Platform 1 reopened November 20.
