= Escondido Transit Center =

Transit center in Escondido, California, United States

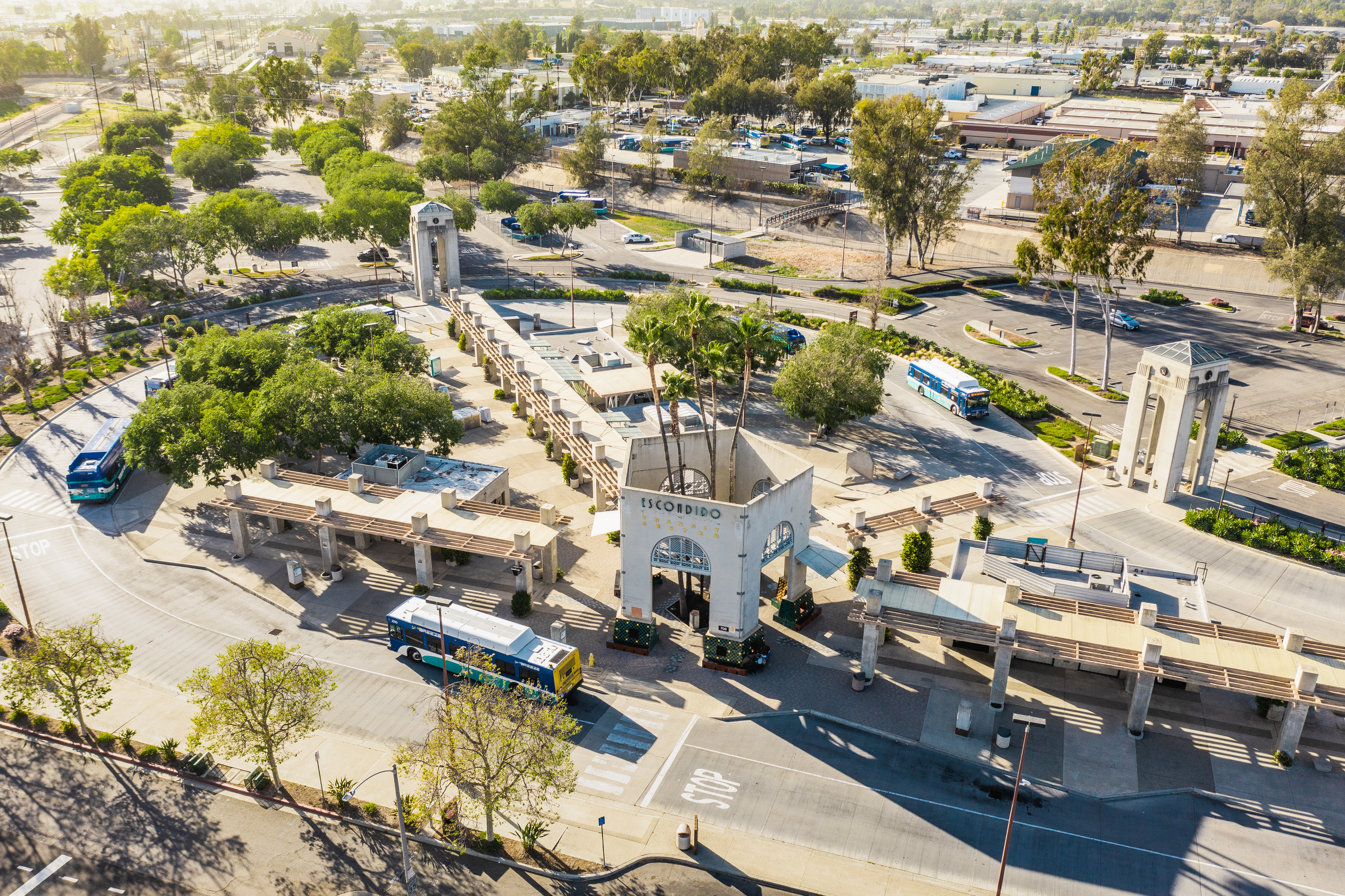
- Escondido Transit Center in 2021

General information
- Location: 796 West Valley Parkway; Escondido, California
- Coordinates: 33°07′08″N 117°05′28″W
- Owner: North County Transit District
- Line: Escondido Subdivision
- Platforms: 1 island platform
- Tracks: 2
- Connections: MTS: Rapid 235, Rapid Express 280; NCTD BREEZE: 305, 308, Rapid 350, 351, 352, 353, 354, 355, 356, 357, 358, 359, FLEX 371, 388, 608, 651, 652; Greyhound Lines; FlixBus

Construction
- Parking: 583 spaces
- Cycle facilities: 12 rack spaces, 3 lockers
- Accessible: Yes

History
- Opened: 1888 (AT&SF); February 21, 1990 (Bus depot); March 9, 2008 (Sprinter)
- Closed: 1946 (AT&SF)
- Rebuilt: March 9, 2008

Services
Preceding station	North County Transit District	Following station
Nordahl Road toward Oceanside	SPRINTER	Terminus
Preceding station	Rapid	Following station
Del Lago toward Santa Fe Depot	Rapid 235	Terminus
Del Lago toward County Admin Center	Rapid Express 280	Terminus
Former services (at AT&SF station)
Preceding station	Atchison, Topeka and Santa Fe Railway	Following station
Richland toward Oceanside	Escondido Branch	Terminus
Location

Escondido Transit Center is a transit center located in downtown Escondido, California. It serves as the current eastern terminus of the North County Transit District's SPRINTER hybrid rail line and the northern terminus of the BREEZE Rapid bus rapid transit line. There are plans to extend the SPRINTER service to North County Mall in southern Escondido, north of Lake Hodges. Escondido Transit Center opened on February 21, 1990. It was rebuilt to add the SPRINTER platform before that line's opening on March 9, 2008.

The station is located just east of Interstate 15 (accessible from Valley Parkway exit) and south of State Route 78. Parking is available. Express bus service to downtown San Diego is available at the Escondido Transit Center, as well as local bus service to inland North County, San Diego. FlixBus buses between San Diego and Las Vegas stop at the center. Greyhound bus lines running between San Diego and San Bernardino stop next to the facility at 700 West Valley Parkway.

The station is a proposed stop on the second phase of the California High-Speed Rail project.
