= America Plaza station =

Trolley station in San Diego

America Plaza
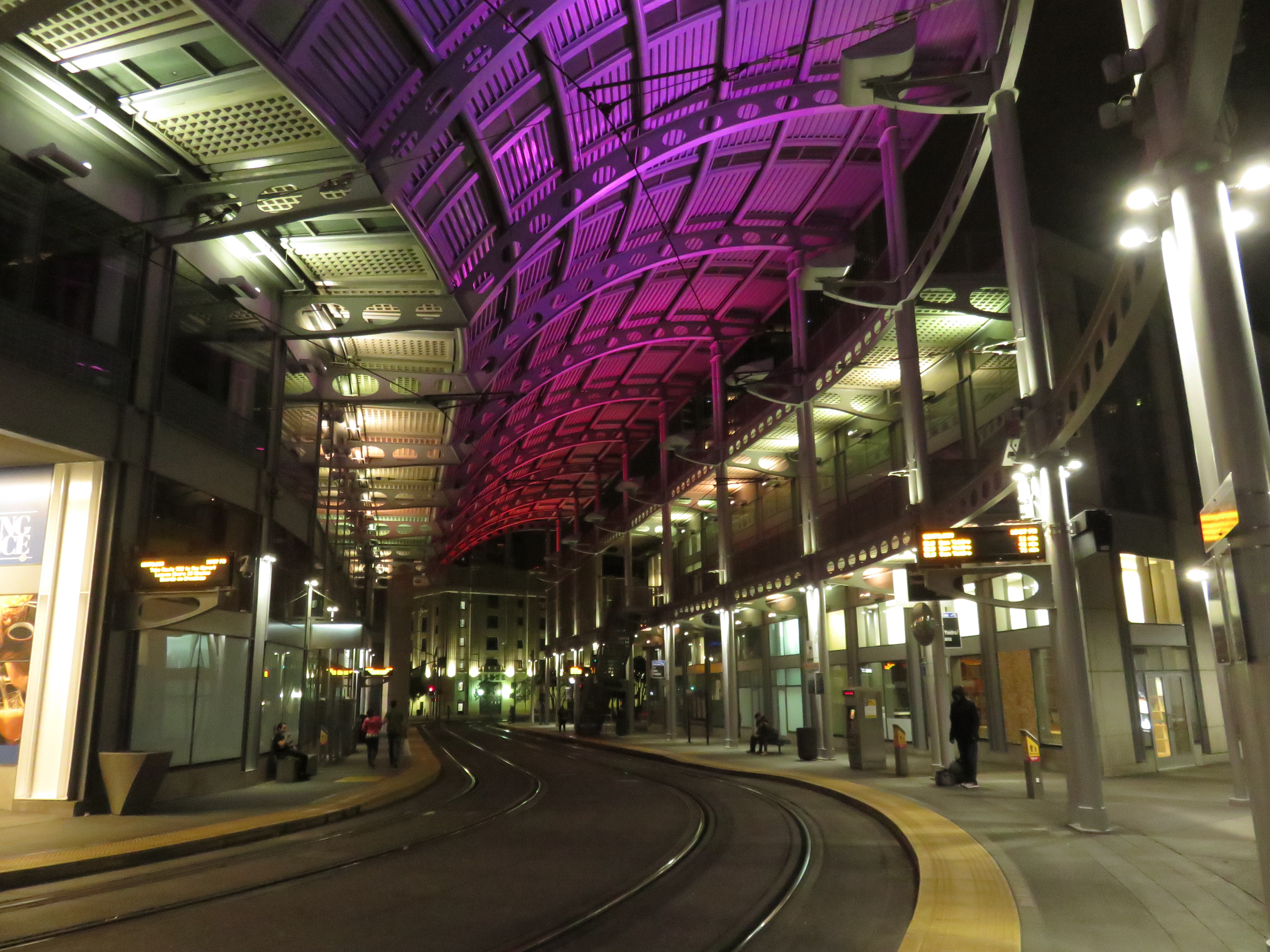
- America Plaza station, 2019

General information
- Location: 1050 India Street; San Diego, California; United States
- Coordinates: 32°42′59″N 117°10′06″W
- Owner: San Diego Metropolitan Transit System
- Operator: San Diego Trolley
- Platforms: 2 side platforms
- Tracks: 2
- Connections: MTS: 83, Rapid 215, Rapid 225, Rapid 235, Rapid Express 280, Rapid Express 290, 923, 992

Construction
- Structure type: At-grade
- Accessible: Disabled access

Other information
- Station code: 75084, 75085

History
- Opened: November 14, 1991
- Rebuilt: 2011

Services
| Preceding station | San Diego Trolley | Following station |
|---|---|---|
| Santa Fe Depot toward UTC | Blue Line | Civic Center toward San Ysidro |
| Seaport Village One-way operation | Silver Line | Civic Center Next clockwise |
| Terminus | Orange Line Late nights only | Civic Center One-way operation |
Former services
| Preceding station | San Diego Trolley | Following station |
|---|---|---|
| Terminus | Orange Line 2017-2018 | Civic Center toward El Cajon |
| Santa Fe Depot Terminus | Orange Line 2012-2017 | Civic Center toward El Cajon |
| Seaport Village toward 12th & Imperial | Orange Line 2005-2012 | Civic Center toward Gillespie Field |
| Seaport Village toward 12th & Imperial | Orange Line 1995-2005 | Civic Center toward Santee |
Location

America Plaza station is a stop on the Blue and Silver lines of the San Diego Trolley. Located in the downtown Core of San Diego, California, it is directly connected to One America Plaza, the city's tallest building. The station, along with its accompanying 34-story high-rise building, opened on November 14, 1991, replacing Columbia Street station, which was one block to the east. Since it opened along a line segment already in service, America Plaza station is the second infill station in the San Diego Trolley system, following E Street station.

== History ==
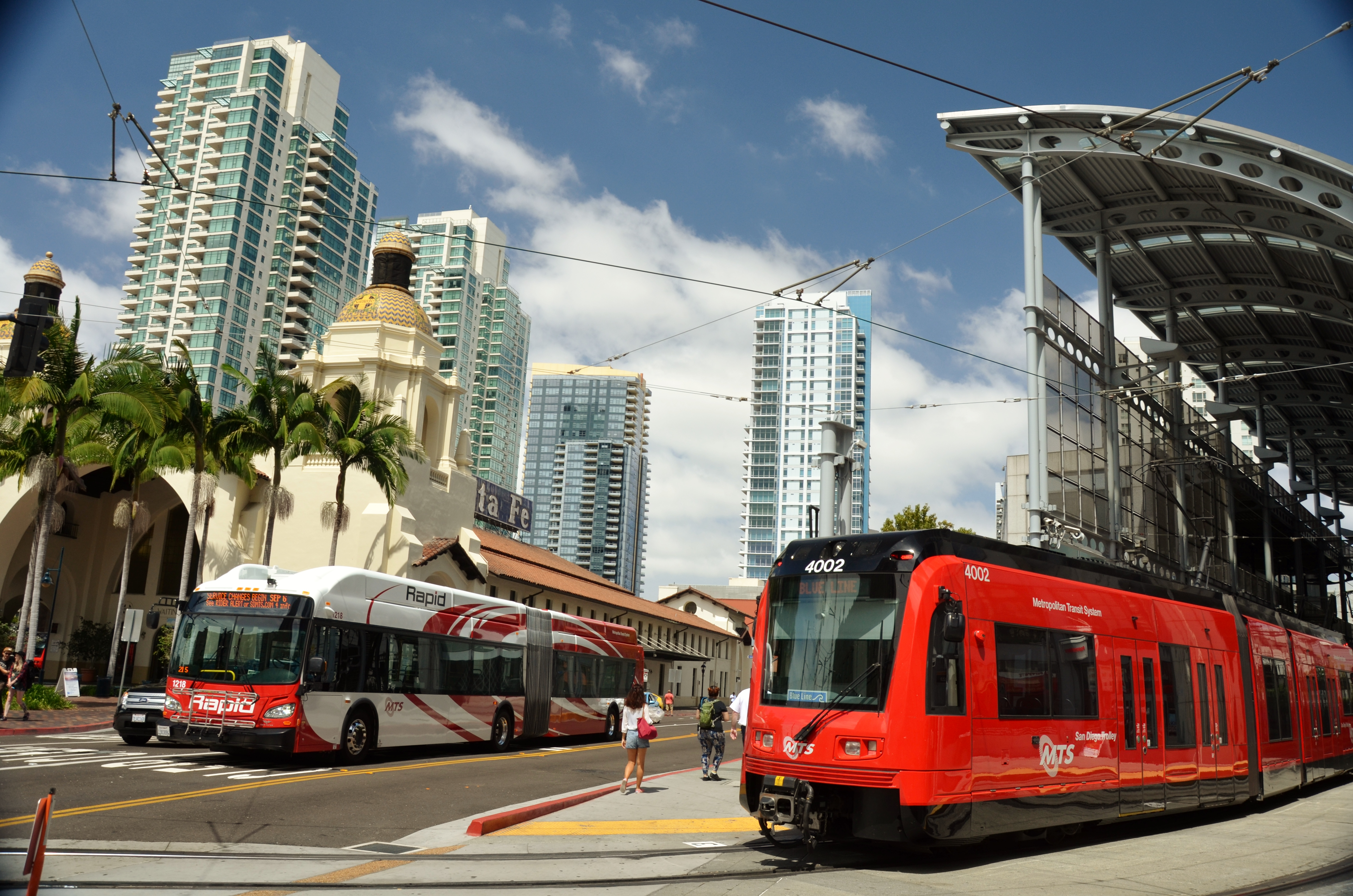
A Blue Line train is stopped under the metal arches of America Plaza station (right) while a Rapid bus departs (left). The colorful tile-covered campanile of Santa Fe Depot station can be seen in the background.

America Plaza was originally the point where the Orange and Blue lines diverged. Prior to the system redesign on September 2, 2012, the Orange Line looped south and east towards Gaslamp Quarter station and then returned to 12th & Imperial Transit Center, while the Blue Line turned north towards Santa Fe Depot en route to Old Town Transit Center. The redesign shortened the Blue Line's northern terminus to America Plaza and rerouted the Orange Line to terminate at Santa Fe Depot, replacing the western portion of the downtown loop with Green Line service. However, with the completion of Mid-Coast Trolley extension on November 21, 2021, the Blue Line was extended northward through Santa Fe Depot and Old Town to serve new stations.

This station underwent renovation from October 21 until December 19, 2011, as part of the Trolley Renewal Project, during which a temporary stop was set up between Columbia and State streets to serve the area.

Additionally, Courthouse station opened on April 29, 2018 becoming the new terminus of the Orange Line.
