= Arnele Avenue station =

San Diego Trolley station

Arnele Avenue

General information
- Location: 762 1/2 North Marshall Avenue; El Cajon, California; United States
- Coordinates: 32°48′17″N 116°58′32″W
- Owner: San Diego Metropolitan Transit System
- Operator: San Diego Trolley
- Line: SD&AE La Mesa Branch
- Platforms: 2 side platforms
- Tracks: 2
- Connections: MTS: 115, 833 (Note: Route 833 serves Arnele Avenue station only in the Southbound direction.)

Construction
- Structure type: At-grade
- Parking: 65 spaces
- Accessible: Disabled access

Other information
- Station code: 75024, 75025

History
- Opened: July 26, 1995
- Rebuilt: 2018

Services
Preceding station	San Diego Trolley	Following station
El Cajon Terminus	Copper Line	Gillespie Field toward Santee
Former services
Preceding station	San Diego Trolley	Following station
El Cajon toward 12th & Imperial	Green Line 2012-2024	Gillespie Field toward Santee
El Cajon toward Old Town	Green Line 2005-2012	Gillespie Field toward Santee
El Cajon toward Courthouse	Orange Line 2018-2024	Terminus
El Cajon toward 12th & Imperial	Orange Line 2005-2012	Gillespie Field Terminus
El Cajon toward 12th & Imperial	Orange Line 1995-2005	Gillespie Field toward Santee
Location

Arnele Avenue station is a San Diego Trolley station served by the Copper Line in the San Diego suburb of El Cajon, California. Located near the intersection of Arnele Avenue and Marshall Avenue, the station serves the surrounding residential community, the Parkway Plaza shopping mall, and other commercial properties in the area. The station also has a small park and ride lot.

== History ==
Arnele Avenue opened as part of the fourth and final segment of the East Line (now Orange Line) on July 26, 1995, which extended the line from El Cajon to Santee Town Center. Green Line service began in July 2005, when the Orange Line was truncated to Gillespie Field. Following the September 2012 system redesign, Orange Line trains stopped serving this station and began terminating at El Cajon. However, the line's eastern terminus was once again extended on April 30, 2018, this time to Arnele Avenue. On September 29, 2024, the station became part of the Copper Line, and both the Green and Orange lines were truncated back to El Cajon.

== See also ==
- List of San Diego Trolley stations
