= UC San Diego Health La Jolla station =

San Diego Trolley station

UC San Diego Health La Jolla
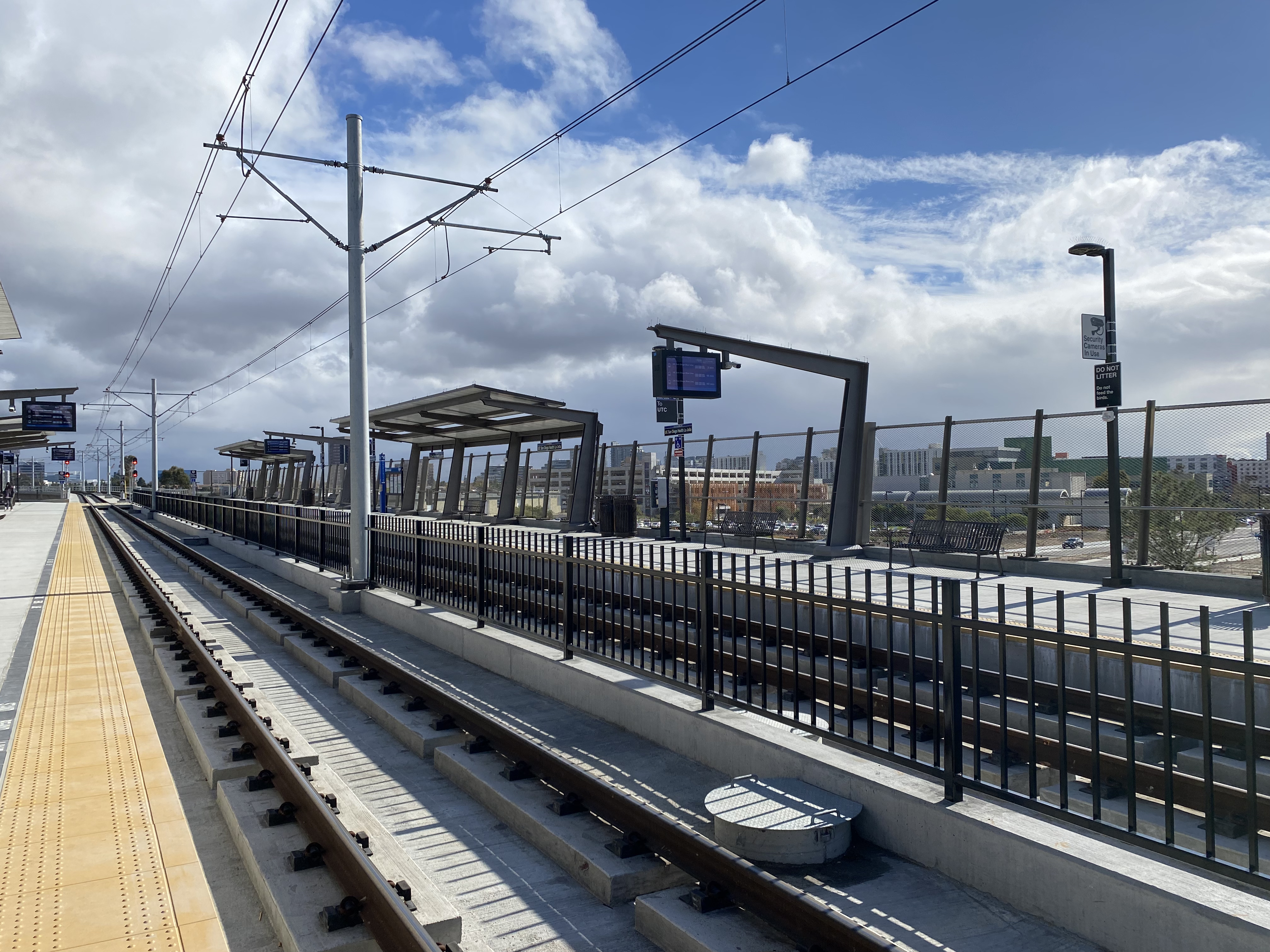
- UC San Diego Health La Jolla station platform

General information
- Location: 3783 Voigt Drive; San Diego, California; United States
- Coordinates: 32°52′55″N 117°13′24″W
- Owner: San Diego Metropolitan Transit System
- Operator: San Diego Trolley
- Platforms: 2 side platforms
- Tracks: 2
- Connections: UC San Diego Triton Transit: Health Campus Connector, Regents Express; FlixBus

Construction
- Structure type: Elevated
- Cycle facilities: 24 lockers
- Accessible: Disabled access

Other information
- Station code: 77783, 77784

History
- Opened: November 21, 2021
- Former names: UCSD East/Voigt Drive station

Services
Preceding station	San Diego Trolley	Following station
Executive Drive toward UTC	Blue Line	UC San Diego Central Campus toward San Ysidro
Location

UC San Diego Health La Jolla station is a San Diego Trolley station located on the UC San Diego East Campus, which includes the UC San Diego Health La Jolla campus of hospitals and medical facilities and the Preuss School. The station is elevated just south of Voigt Drive at Campus Point Drive.

A bridge directly connects the platform level with Scripps Memorial Hospital La Jolla. The station is also within walking distance of Jacobs Medical Center and the Moores Cancer Center.

It opened on November 21, 2021, as a new station on the Blue Line, constructed as part of the Mid-Coast Trolley extension project.

== Connections ==
UCSD Triton Transit shuttles on the Health Campus Connector and Regents Express routes stop north of the station at street level. A FlixBus stop is located south of the station, with services to Los Angeles and Fresno.
