= Amaya Drive station =

San Diego Trolley station

Amaya Drive
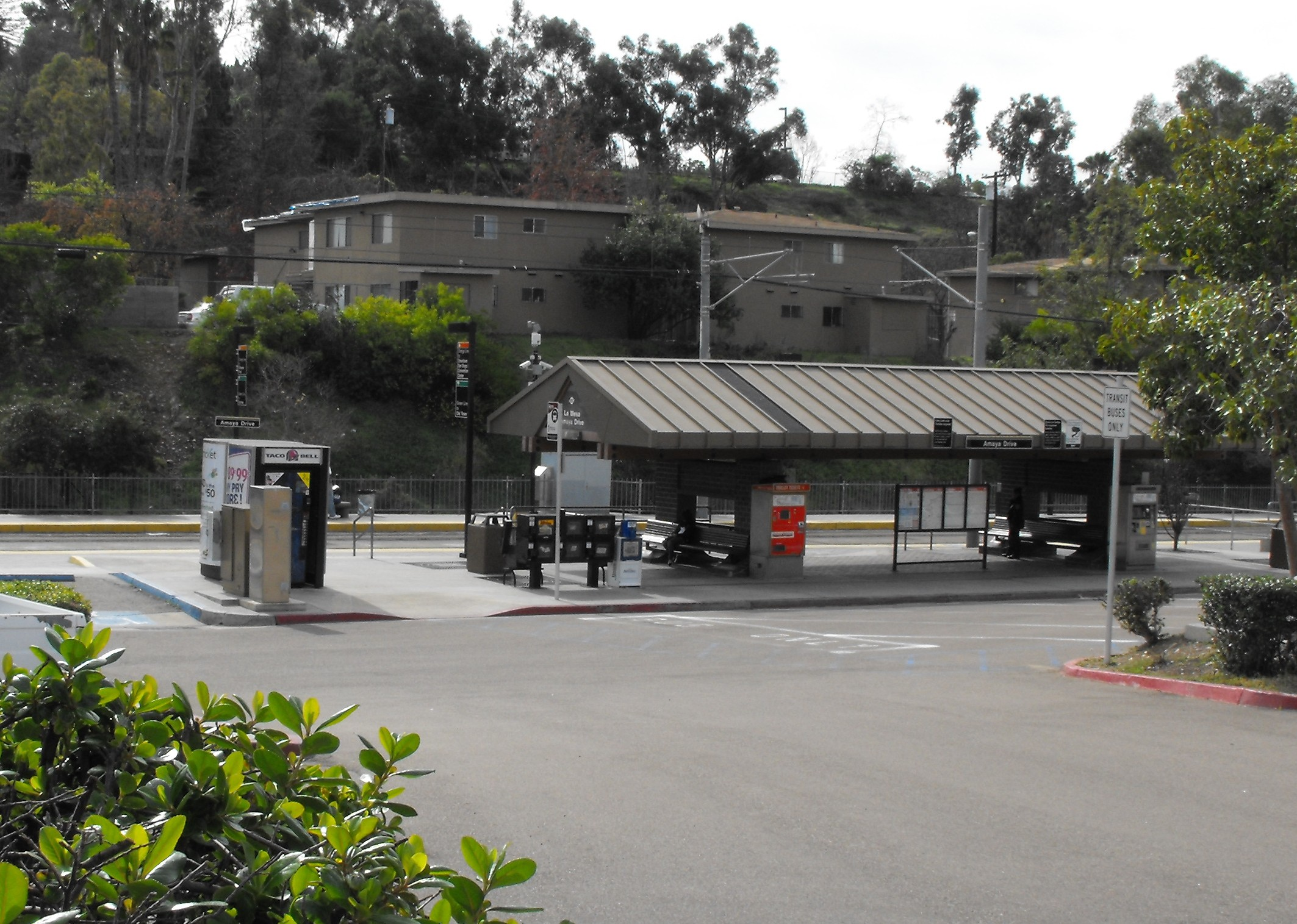
- Amaya Drive station in 2010

General information
- Location: 9100 Amaya Drive; La Mesa, California; United States
- Coordinates: 32°47′08″N 117°00′06″W
- Owner: San Diego Metropolitan Transit System
- Operator: San Diego Trolley
- Line: SD&AE La Mesa Branch
- Platforms: 2 side platforms
- Tracks: 2

Construction
- Structure type: At-grade
- Parking: 236 spaces
- Cycle facilities: 4 rack spaces, 1 locker
- Accessible: Disabled access

Other information
- Station code: 75028, 75029

History
- Opened: June 23, 1989
- Rebuilt: 2018

Services
Preceding station	San Diego Trolley	Following station
Grossmont toward 12th & Imperial	Green Line	El Cajon Terminus
Grossmont toward Courthouse	Orange Line	El Cajon Terminus
Location

Amaya Drive station is a San Diego Trolley station served by the Orange and Green lines in the San Diego suburb of La Mesa, California. It is on Amaya Drive east of its intersection with Fletcher Parkway. The station serves mainly as a park and ride stop for the surrounding community.

== History ==
Amaya Drive opened as part of the third segment of the East Line (now Orange Line) on June 23, 1989, which operated from 12th & Imperial to El Cajon. Green Line service began in July 2005, when the segment connecting Mission San Diego to Grossmont first opened.

== See also ==
- List of San Diego Trolley stations
