= Executive Drive station =

San Diego Trolley station

Executive Drive
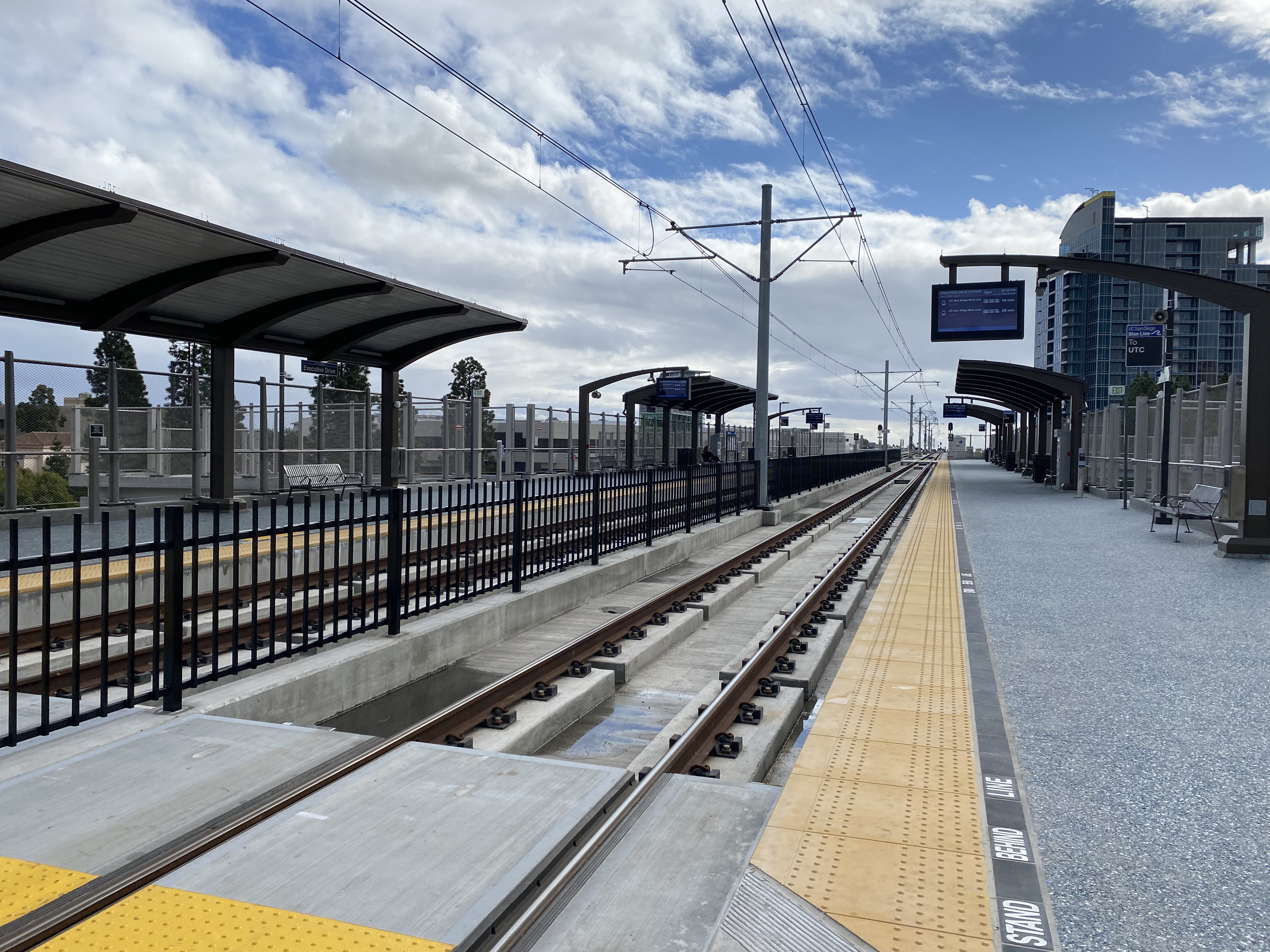
- Executive Drive station platform

General information
- Location: 9235 Genesee Avenue; San Diego, California; United States
- Coordinates: 32°52′09″N 117°12′50″W
- Owner: San Diego Metropolitan Transit System
- Operator: San Diego Trolley
- Platforms: 2 side platforms
- Tracks: 2
- Connections: MTS: Rapid 204, Rapid 237, 921A, 979

Construction
- Structure type: Elevated
- Parking: 333 spaces
- Cycle facilities: 14 lockers
- Accessible: Disabled access

Other information
- Station code: 77785, 77786

History
- Opened: November 21, 2021

Services
Preceding station	San Diego Trolley	Following station
UTC Terminus	Blue Line	UC San Diego Health La Jolla toward San Ysidro
Location

Executive Drive station is a San Diego Trolley station in San Diego, California, located near the intersection of Executive Drive and Genesee Avenue. The station began service on November 21, 2021 on the Blue Line; it was constructed as part of the Mid-Coast Trolley extension project.
