= El Cajon Transit Center =

San Diego Trolley and bus station

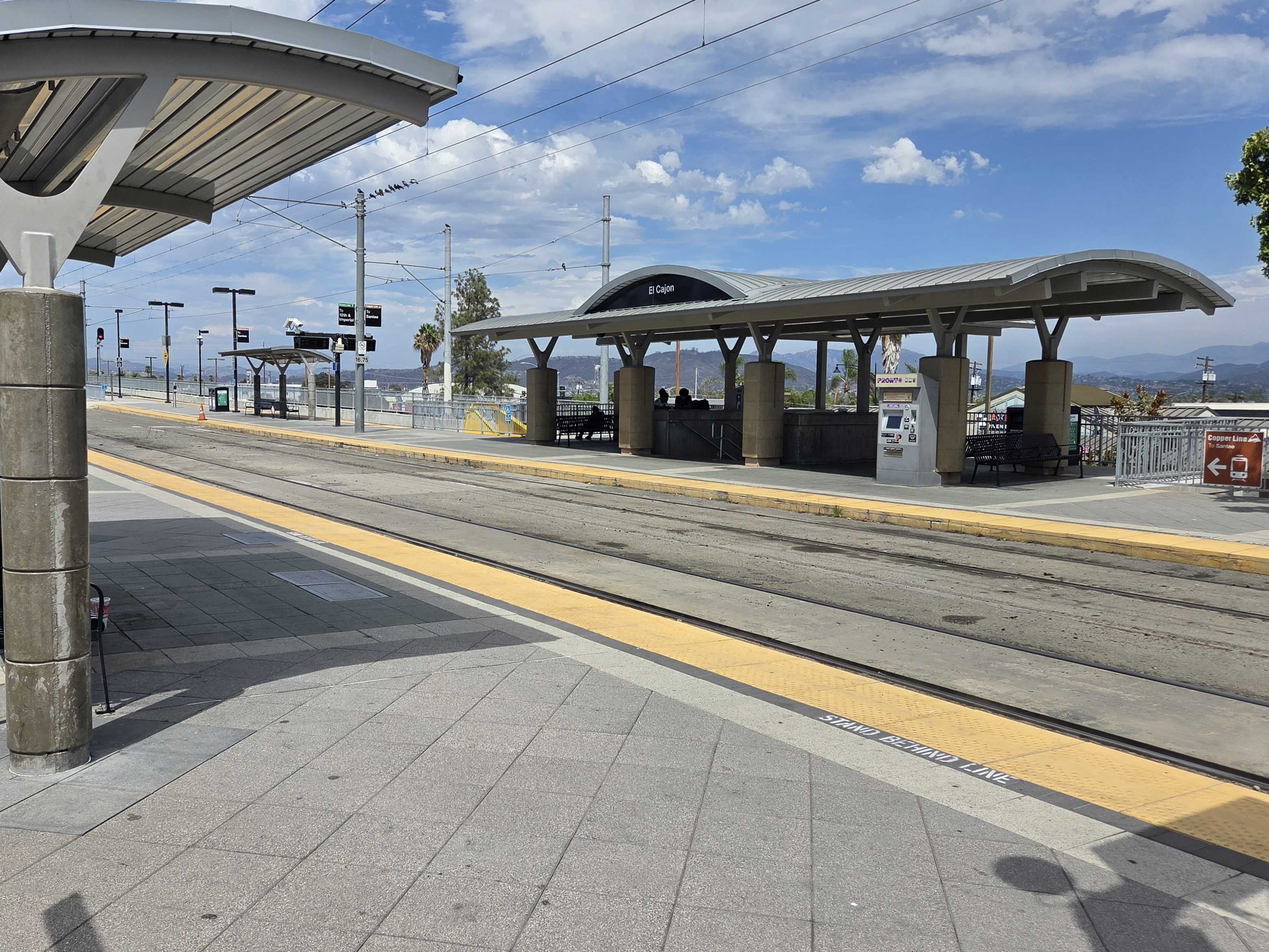
- El Cajon Transit Center, April 2026

General information
- Location: 352 South Marshall Avenue; El Cajon, California; United States
- Coordinates: 32°47′34″N 116°58′34″W
- Owner: San Diego Metropolitan Transit System
- Operator: San Diego Trolley
- Line: SD&AE La Mesa Branch
- Platforms: 3 side platforms
- Tracks: 3
- Connections: MTS: 115, 815, 816, 833, 848, 864, 872, 874, 875, 888, 891, 892, 894; Greyhound Lines; Sycuan Casino Shuttle

Construction
- Structure type: At-grade
- Parking: 469 spaces
- Cycle facilities: 4 rack spaces, 1 locker
- Accessible: Disabled access

Other information
- Station code: 75026, 75027

History
- Opened: June 23, 1989
- Rebuilt: 2018
- Former names: Main & Marshall (1989–1990)

Services
Preceding station	San Diego Trolley	Following station
Terminus	Copper Line	Arnele Avenue toward Santee
Amaya Drive toward 12th & Imperial	Green Line	Terminus
Amaya Drive toward Courthouse	Orange Line	Terminus
Former services
Preceding station	San Diego Trolley	Following station
Amaya Drive toward 12th & Imperial	Green Line 2012-2024	Arnele Avenue toward Santee
Amaya Drive toward Old Town	Green Line 2005-2012	Arnele Avenue toward Santee
Amaya Drive toward Courthouse	Orange Line 2018-2024	Arnele Avenue Terminus
Amaya Drive toward America Plaza	Orange Line 2017-2018	Terminus
Amaya Drive toward Santa Fe Depot	Orange Line 2012-2017	Terminus
Amaya Drive toward 12th & Imperial	Orange Line 2005-2012	Arnele Avenue toward Gillespie Field
Amaya Drive toward 12th & Imperial	Orange Line 1995-2005	Arnele Avenue toward Santee
Track layout
Key
Location

El Cajon Transit Center (formerly Main & Marshall station) is a San Diego Trolley station served by the Copper, Green and Orange lines in the San Diego suburb of El Cajon, California. It is along Marshall Avenue between Palm Avenue and Main Street. The station is a major commuter center for the large suburb and is the convergence of multiple local and regional bus routes operated by the San Diego Metropolitan Transit System and Greyhound Lines.

== History ==
El Cajon opened as the eastern terminus of the third segment of the East Line (now Orange Line) on June 23, 1989, which operated from 12th & Imperial in downtown San Diego. The physical line was extended to its current terminus at Santee Town Center on July 26, 1995.

From July 1995 to July 2005, Orange Line service continued to terminate at the end of the line at Santee Town Center.

When the Green Line opened in July 2005, the new route took over service to Santee, and the Orange Line was truncated to Gillespie Field.

The September 2012 system redesign truncated the Orange Line once again to El Cajon.

Following the sale of the naming rights of the Green Line to Sycuan Casino, the station was renamed El Cajon–Sycuan. However, this is no longer the case.

The April 2018 system redesign extended the Orange Line to Arnele Avenue, following the opening of Courthouse station in April 2018. Courthouse became the line's current western terminus, and the one-stop extension to Arnele was meant to relieve congestion and confusion at El Cajon.

The original layout of El Cajon Transit Center

In 2020, the San Diego Reader reported that black market commerce was thriving at the station.

In 2024, a third track was added to the station, and the eastern platform was extended to allow shuttle trains to terminate there. The Copper Line then began service on September 29, operating between this new platform and Santee, and allowing the Green and Orange lines to terminate in El Cajon.

== Station layout ==
There are three tracks, each served by a side platform.

== See also ==
- List of San Diego Trolley stations
