= Copper Line (San Diego Trolley) =

Light rail line in San Diego County, California

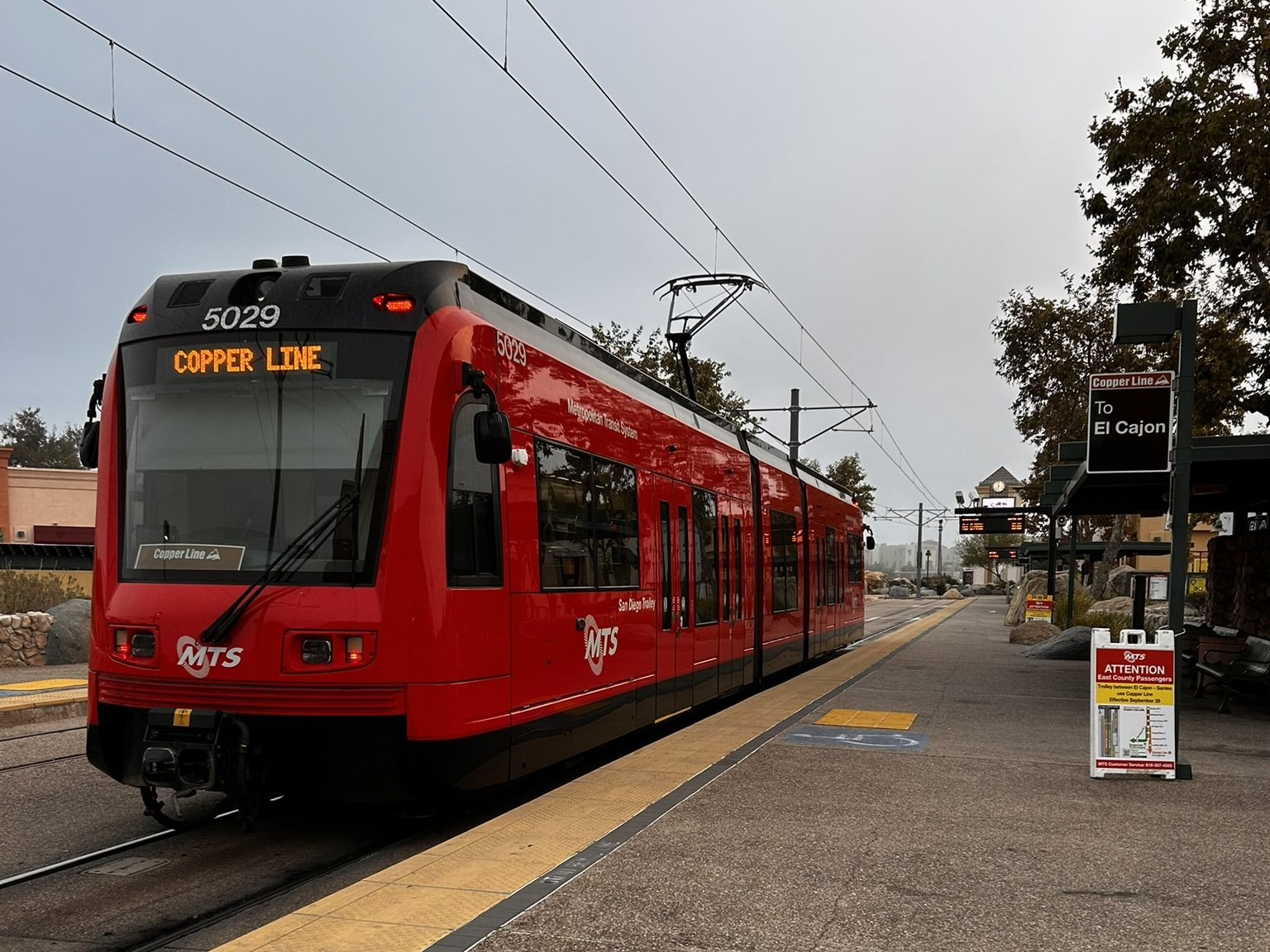
- Copper Line trolley at Santee on the first day of service

Overview
- Other name: Copper Line–East County Connector
- Owner: San Diego Metropolitan Transit System
- Locale: San Diego, California
- Termini: Santee; El Cajon
- Stations: 4
- Website: sdmts.com/inside-mts/current-projects/copper-line-east-county-connector

Service
- Type: Light rail
- System: San Diego Trolley
- Route number: 535 (Note: Internal documents only)
- Operator(s): San Diego Trolley, Inc.
- Rolling stock: Single-car trains
- Daily ridership: 1,760 (FY 2026)
- Ridership: 586,659 (FY 2026)

History
- Opened: September 29, 2024

Technical
- Line length: 3.8 mi (6.1 km)
- Num of tracks: 2 (El Cajon–Gillespie Field); 1 (Gillespie Field–Santee)
- Track gauge: 4 ft 8 1/2 in (1,435 mm) standard gauge
- Electrification: Overhead line, 600 V DC
- Operating speed: 55 mph (89 km/h) (max)
Route map
Copper Line highlighted in copper

The Copper Line, officially the Copper Line–East County Connector, is a light rail line in the San Diego Trolley system, operated by San Diego Trolley, Inc. an operating division of the San Diego Metropolitan Transit System (MTS). Located in East County, San Diego, it operates as a shuttle between El Cajon Transit Center and Santee station. It opened on September 29, 2024, making it the system's newest line.

The line is one of five lines in the trolley system, the others being the Blue, Orange, Green, and Silver (operates on select holidays only) lines. MTS created the Copper Line because the section of the line between Gillespie Field station and Santee has a single track, which has been the source of delays that impact both the Green and Orange lines. The Copper Line aims to alleviate these issues by creating a dedicated shuttle service disconnected from the larger Green and Orange lines.

== History ==
=== Background ===
The tracks between El Cajon and Santee originally opened on July 26, 1995, as part of the fourth extension of the Orange Line (known as the "East Line" until 1997). Between Gillespie Field station and Santee Town Center, the line is single tracked and street running in the median strip of Cuyamaca Street.

This single-tracked section has caused operational issues for the San Diego Trolley, which became worse after the opening of the Green Line in 2005, which shared the tracks between Santee and El Cajon with the Orange Line. Since that time, SDMTS has tried several different service patterns to attempt to lessen the operational issues, including truncating the Orange Line at various stations in the area. SDMTS reports that Green Line trains are often unable to complete their route to Santee and are turned around at Gillespie Field at least once a day. In addition, during periods of heavy ridership such as San Diego Comic-Con, Green Line trolley service between Gillespie Field and Santee was replaced with a shuttle. The trolley also adds to congestion in the Santee area as the three-car trains (necessary on other sections of the line) operate with few passengers and stop traffic as they slowly traverse Cuyamaca Street.

=== Copper Line proposal ===
To address these issues, starting in the early 2020s, MTS began planning to add a third track and extending a platform at the El Cajon Transit Center, to allow shuttle trains to terminate there. MTS believes that Copper Line shuttle trains will alleviate these issues by creating a dedicated shuttle service disconnected from the larger Green and Orange lines. MTS says that these shorter trains will also improve roadway traffic, since drivers at the railroad crossings on Mission Gorge Road and Cuyamaca Street will have shorter wait times as the single-car Copper Line trains pass.

MTS accepted written public comments about this proposal until 1:00 PM on June 19, 2024, for potential approval at its June 20, 2024, meeting. MTS stated that Copper Line service could begin as soon as September 1, 2024, running once every 15 minutes from 5:00 AM until midnight.

=== Approval of the Copper Line ===
Although the promised June 20 public hearing was held, the MTS Board of Directors was prevented from approving the Copper Line because under federal law, a service equity analysis needed to be redone. Although the original analysis concluded that the Copper Line would not negatively effect people of color or low-income residents, MTS conceded at the meeting that they needed more analysis.

On July 18, 2024, the MTS board of directors unanimously approved to implement the Copper Line. In preparation for the opening of the Copper Line, MTS made safety improvements to the El Cajon Transit Center, including the addition of new personnel, support staff, and signs.

MTS has stated that the new Copper Line will save $1 million in operational costs, and although only 8% of trolley trips will be affected by this service change, it will improve the ability of the Green and Orange Lines to run on time.

Schedules for the Copper Line were published in August 2024, and the line began service on September 29, 2024.

== Stations ==
Station	Location	Connections
Santee	Santee	MTS: 832, 833, 834; Park and ride (number of spaces varies)
Gillespie Field	Santee	Park and ride: 175 spaces
Arnele Avenue	El Cajon	MTS: 115, 833 (Note: Route 833 serves Arnele Avenue station only in the Southbound direction); Park and ride: 65 spaces
El Cajon	El Cajon	Green Line Orange Line; MTS: 115, 815, 816, 833, 848, 864, 872, 874, 875, 888, 891, 892, 894; Greyhound Lines; Sycuan Casino Shuttle; Park and ride: 469 spaces
