= Gillespie Field station =

San Diego Trolley station

Gillespie Field
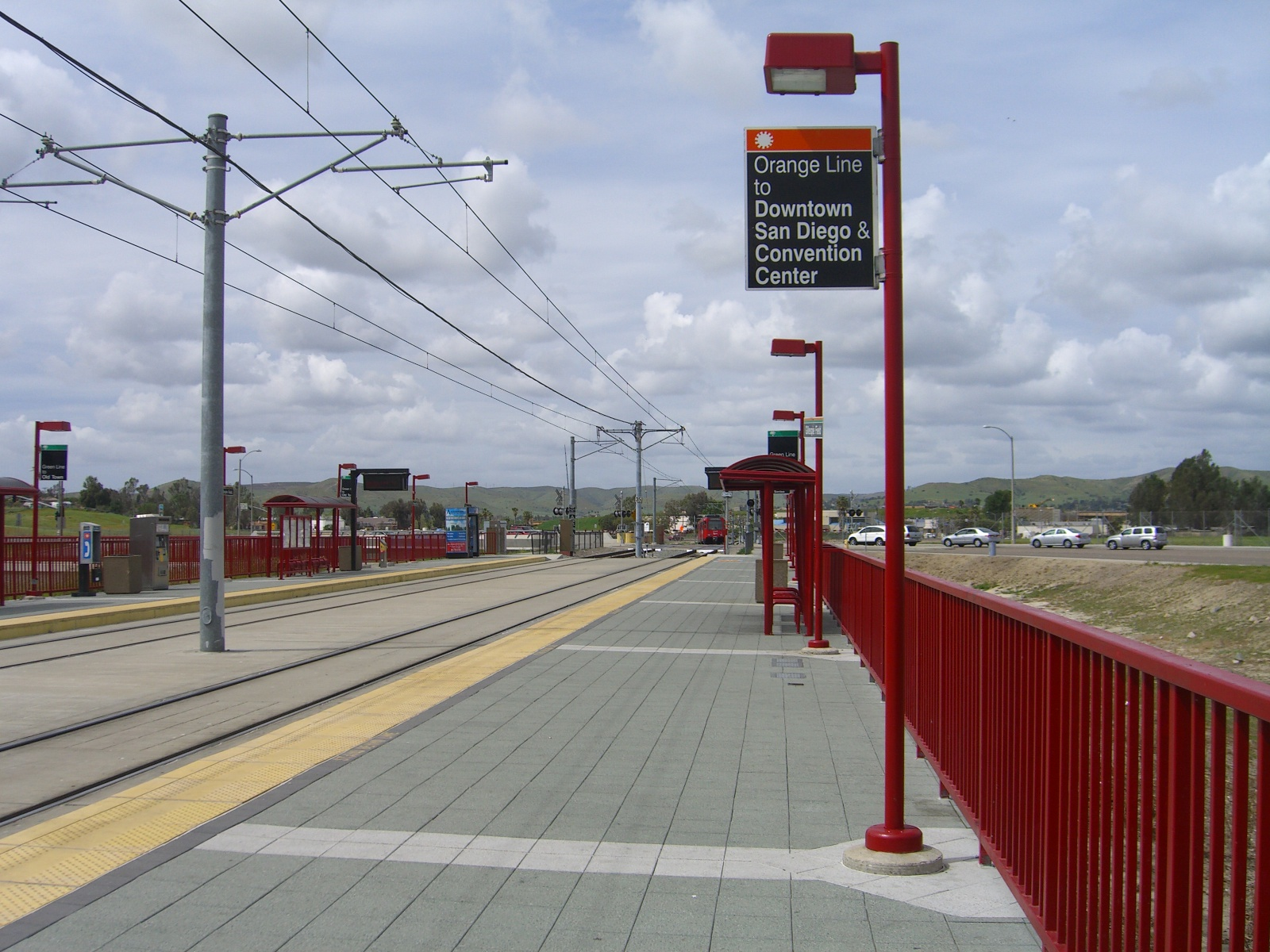
- Gillespie Field station, March 2010

General information
- Location: 1990 1/2 North Cuyamaca Street; Santee, California; United States
- Coordinates: 32°49′38″N 116°58′56″W
- Owner: San Diego Metropolitan Transit System
- Operator: San Diego Trolley
- Platforms: 2 side platforms
- Tracks: 2

Construction
- Structure type: At-grade
- Parking: 175 spaces
- Cycle facilities: 8 rack spaces, 2 lockers
- Accessible: Disabled access

Other information
- Station code: 75022, 75023

History
- Opened: July 26, 1995
- Rebuilt: 2005
- Former names: Weld Boulevard (1995–2005)

Services
Preceding station	San Diego Trolley	Following station
Arnele Avenue toward El Cajon	Copper Line	Santee Terminus
Former services
Preceding station	San Diego Trolley	Following station
Arnele Avenue toward 12th & Imperial	Green Line 2012-2024	Santee Terminus
Arnele Avenue toward Old Town	Green Line 2005-2012	Santee Terminus
Arnele Avenue toward 12th & Imperial	Orange Line 2005-2012	Terminus
Arnele Avenue toward 12th & Imperial	Orange Line 1995-2005	Santee Terminus
Location

Gillespie Field station (formerly Weld Boulevard station) is a Copper Line station of the San Diego Trolley in the San Diego suburb of Santee, California. It is located across Marshall Avenue from Gillespie Field, a county airport, however there is no public access to the airport and the surrounding area is sparse and largely unwalkable. The station has no bus connections, therefore most passengers who use the station also use the 175-space park-and-ride lot.

== History ==
Gillespie opened as part of the fourth and final segment of the East Line (now Orange Line) on July 26, 1995, which extended the physical line from El Cajon to Santee Town Center. With the opening of the Green Line in July 2005, this service was replaced, and Orange Line trolleys began to terminate at this station. This was due to the route between Gillespie Field and Santee Town Center being single tracked, and having two lines running on that route would cause operational issues.

Orange Line service was further truncated to El Cajon on September 2, 2012, as part of a system redesign due to low ridership between the two stations, leaving only the Green Line serving this station.

Gillespie Field station was ranked worst rail station in California in a 2015 UC Berkeley School of Law study, due to its sparse, unwalkable location and lack of ridership. Study co-author Elkind was quoted in the press, “I almost wondered if there was really a station out there or if we got the GPS wrong. It looked like cow pastures.”

To further reduce operational issues on the single track between Gillespie Field and Santee, the Copper Line began service on September 29, 2024, and the Green Line was also truncated back to El Cajon.

== See also ==
- List of San Diego Trolley stations
