= San Diego Trolley =

Light rail system in San Diego County, California

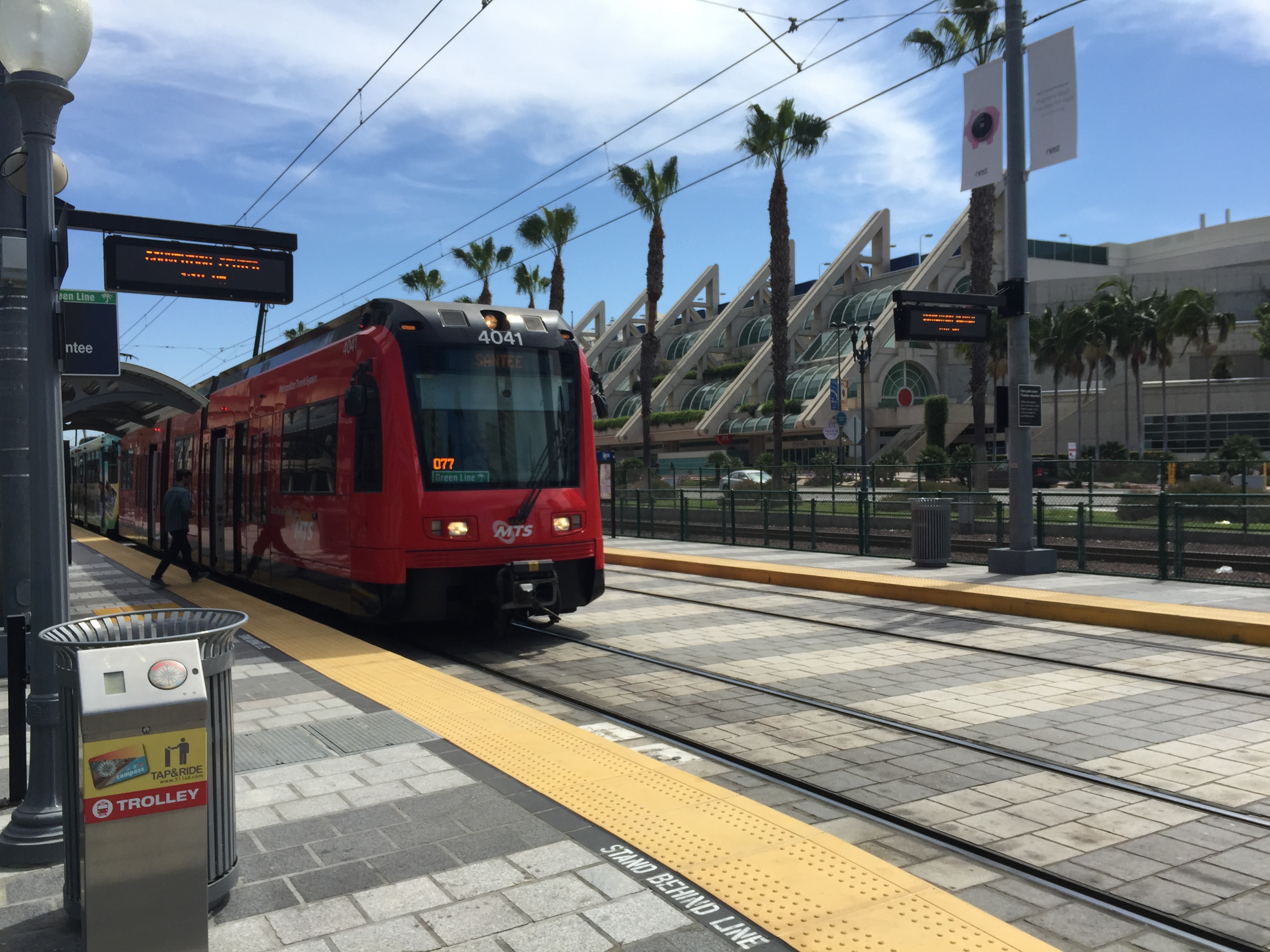
- A Green Line trolley at Convention Center station

Overview
- Owner: San Diego Metropolitan Transit System
- Locale: San Diego County, California, United States
- Transit type: Light rail
- Number of lines: 4, plus 1 limited service heritage streetcar line
- Number of stations: 62
- Daily ridership: 130,000 (weekdays, Q2 2026)
- Annual ridership: 41,069,900 (2025)
- Headquarters: James R. Mills Building; 1255 Imperial Avenue; San Diego, California
- Website: San Diego Trolley

Operation
- Began operation: July 26, 1981; 45 years ago
- Operators: San Diego Trolley, Inc.
- Number of vehicles: 168 light rail vehicles: 11 Siemens S70; 65 Siemens S70 US; 92 Siemens S700 US; 3 historic vehicles: 2 PCC streetcars; 1 Siemens–Duewag U2

Technical
- System length: 65 mi (105 km)
- No. of tracks: 2 tracks (Note: There is a single track section of the Copper Line at its northern terminus.)
- Track gauge: 4 ft 8 1/2 in (1,435 mm) standard gauge
- Electrification: Overhead line, 600 V DC
- Top speed: 55 mph (89 km/h)
System map
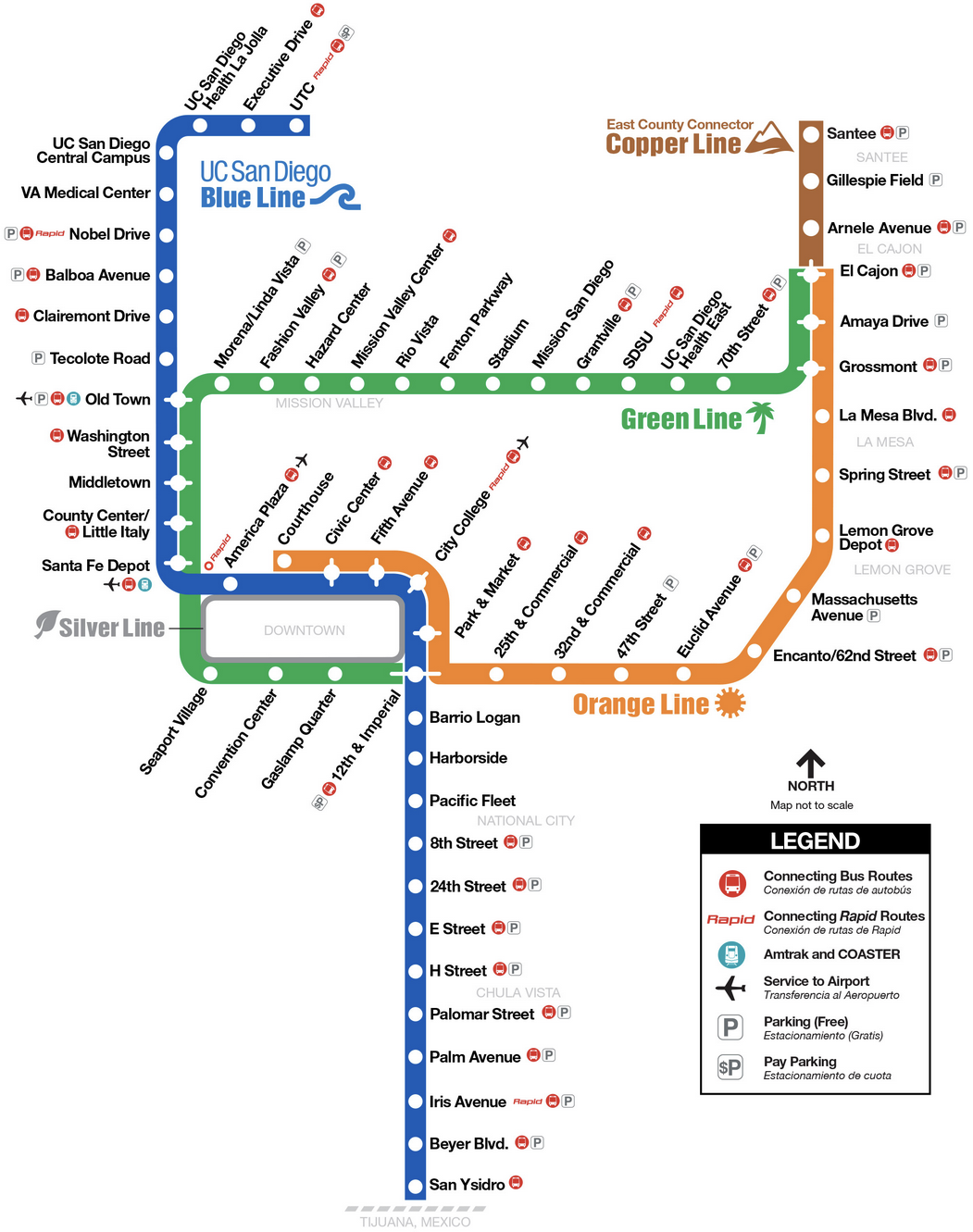

- Diagram does not include Silver Line
Key

The San Diego Trolley is a light rail system serving San Diego County, California. The trolley's operator, San Diego Trolley, Inc. (reporting mark SDTI), is a subsidiary of the San Diego Metropolitan Transit System (MTS). The trolley operates as a critical component of MTS, with connections to and integrated travel tickets with the local bus systems.

The trolley system serves 62 stations, over about 67.9 miles (109.3 km) of route, using four primary lines (Blue, Orange, Green, and Copper) that operate daily, and a "downtown loop" heritage streetcar line (Silver) that operates on holidays. There is one downtown station where all major lines connect, and thirteen other stations that provide transfers to a second line (two of these also provide connections to commuter rail systems).

The trolley began service on July 26, 1981, making it the oldest of the second-generation light rail systems in the United States, and the success of the system helped spark a nationwide revival of light rail. In 2025, the trolley had the second-highest ridership of any light rail system in the United States, with 38,047,300 annual rides, or about 130,000 per weekday as of the second quarter of 2026.

== History ==
2023 was the 42nd anniversary of the San Diego Trolley, and MTS prepared a brief historical review of San Diego trolleys, and in particular the San Diego Trolley. MTS also has a more extensive slideshow and timeline available. The last day of streetcar operation in San Diego was April 23, 1949. On July 19, 1981, electric railcars returned to San Diego streets on the first modern American light rail system integrated with its bus system.

=== Early history ===
Electric rail service in San Diego traces its roots back to 1891 when John D. Spreckels incorporated the San Diego Electric Railway. San Diego's streetcar system had been replaced with buses in 1949, and by 1966 the local bus company, San Diego Transit, was facing a financial crisis and public takeover.

Planning for mass transit in the San Diego region began in 1966 under the auspices of the Comprehensive Planning Organization (CPO, now known as the San Diego Association of Governments, SANDAG), an intergovernmental agency of 13 cities and San Diego County.

Over the next decade, the CPO researched various technologies including improvements to local buses, express buses, heavy rail, light rail, and advanced technologies. The CPO also closely studied the San Francisco Bay Area Rapid Transit (BART) system, then under construction. Ultimately, the early studies went nowhere due to disagreements between stakeholders and a lack of funding.

In 1975, the CPO published the Regional Transportation Plan which included a 58-mile (93 km) intermediate capacity fixed guideway system (an untested technology at the time) at a cost of $1.5 billion.

=== Metropolitan Transit Development Board ===
In the early 1970s, three state legislative acts would set the stage for the construction of mass transit in the San Diego region.

The Transportation Development Act, signed by Governor Ronald Reagan in 1971, earmarked 25% of the state sales tax for funding transportation projects, including mass transit. A 1974 amendment to Article 19 of the Constitution of California permitted the use of gas tax revenues, previously reserved for highway construction, for construction of rail systems. Finally, a 1975 law established the San Diego Metropolitan Transit Development Board (MTDB) with a clear mission: design, construct and operate a guideway transit system. The entire process was assigned to MTDB to assure accountability. The legislation was written and supported by State Senator James R. Mills, the President Pro Tem during this period and a strong transit advocate.

The MTDB formally started operations on January 1, 1976. The MTDB's enabling legislation and principles adopted by the Board required the planning give added weight to systems that satisfy a number of criteria: priority consideration for technologies available and in use, a system that is capable of being brought into operation incrementally, and using rights-of-way owned by public entities to minimize construction costs.

In December 1976, the MTDB launched its 18-month Guideway Planning Project to be held in two phases. Phase 1 involved the evaluation of potential corridors based on the CPO's 1975 Regional Transportation Plan and was guided by principles set by the MTDB board: the corridor should extend a long-distance and offer high-speed operation, the system should be at grade in a mostly exclusive right-of-way, capital costs should be low, and operating deficits should be minimized. Phase 1 studied over 100 miles of potential corridors with 45 miles of corridor recommended for further evaluation in Phase 2. At about the same time, a working paper presented an evaluation of four guideway technologies: light rail, two categories of heavy rail, and Automated Small Vehicle Transit.

In August 1977, the MTDB board selected the South Bay region for the detailed Phase 2 study. There would be several potential corridors to consider, including along freeways (Interstate highways I-5, I-8 & I-805 and State Routes 94 & 16), along existing railroad rights-of-way, and arterial roads.

In October 1977 the board selected light rail as the lone guideway transit technology to be studied (it would also be compared to several all-bus alternatives). In making the decision to pursue light rail, the MTBD board said it best followed the principles it laid out as light rail can offer high-speed travel, the right-of-way is flexible, and construction costs can be low when at-grade construction is maximized. The technology was new for the United States, but was well established in Germany.

=== Hurricane Kathleen ===
On September 10, 1976, nature intervened, setting off a chain of events that would help decide the corridor to be used.

Hurricane Kathleen destroyed parts of San Diego and Arizona Eastern Railway (SD&AE) Desert Line (east of San Diego), which at the time was owned by Southern Pacific (SP) railroad. The SD&AE offered freight service with a line that traveled between downtown San Diego, San Ysidro, northern Baja California (in Mexico), and Imperial County before connecting with the rest of the SP system in Plaster City, California. The hurricane caused $1.3 million worth of damage to the line ($7.36 million adjusted for inflation), primarily in Imperial County, east of San Diego. Freight service was suspended, and in light of the extensive damages, SP petitioned the Interstate Commerce Commission to abandon the SD&AE on August 9, 1977.

The MTDB immediately began studying the SD&AE corridor between downtown San Diego and the San Ysidro Port of Entry for joint use by electric light rail and freight trains. In June 1978, the MTDB found the entire joint-use project feasible.

At the same time, the San Diego County Board of Supervisors became concerned about the potential loss of freight service on the SD&AE, which was seen as vital to the county's economic interests and the continued viability of San Diego as a deep-water port. The county commissioned its own study to examine using a portion of the SD&AE tracks for passenger service which would share the track with freight services, the motivation being the transit services could share the costs of maintaining the tracks. San Diego County proposed operating either commuter rail trains or self-powered diesel rail cars.

=== Initial implementation ===
Diagram of the South Line as originally opened in 1981

In 1978, the Interstate Commerce Commission denied the request to abandon the SD&AE, prompting Southern Pacific to offer the railroad for sale to anyone willing to maintain freight operations on the line. The MTDB stepped in and offered to buy the SD&AE for $18.1 million if the Southern Pacific fully repaired the hurricane-damaged line. The deal closed on August 20, 1979, with the final acquisition occurring on November 1, 1979. The MTDB quickly secured a deal with the San Diego and Imperial Valley Railroad to continue freight service along the line.

The purchase gave MTDB ownership of two sections of right-of-way that could be used for mass transit: the SD&AE Main Line from downtown San Diego to San Ysidro, and the SD&AE La Mesa Branch from downtown San Diego to El Cajon.

With all the planning in place, construction of the 15.9-mile (25.6 km) "South Line" transit corridor (the southern portion of today's Blue Line) was able to begin just one month after acquisition in December 1979 and would be accomplished in two phases.

The first phase of the project cost $86 million, which included the purchase of the SD&AE, 14 light rail vehicles, construction of a single-tracked electrified light rail line along the 14.2-mile (22.9 km) SD&AE Main Line and construction of a 1.7-mile (2.7 km) section of new street running tracks in downtown San Diego. To control costs, only minor rehabilitation was conducted on the SD&AE corridor, with the MTDB replacing about 40% of the ties, welding the jointed rail, constructing electric catenaries, and installing an absolute block signal system.

Funding for the project came entirely from Transportation Development Act state sales tax and local gas tax revenues. Federal funds were not actively sought due to the locally perceived notion that San Diego would not qualify due to low population densities, uncongested highways, and undefined corridors.

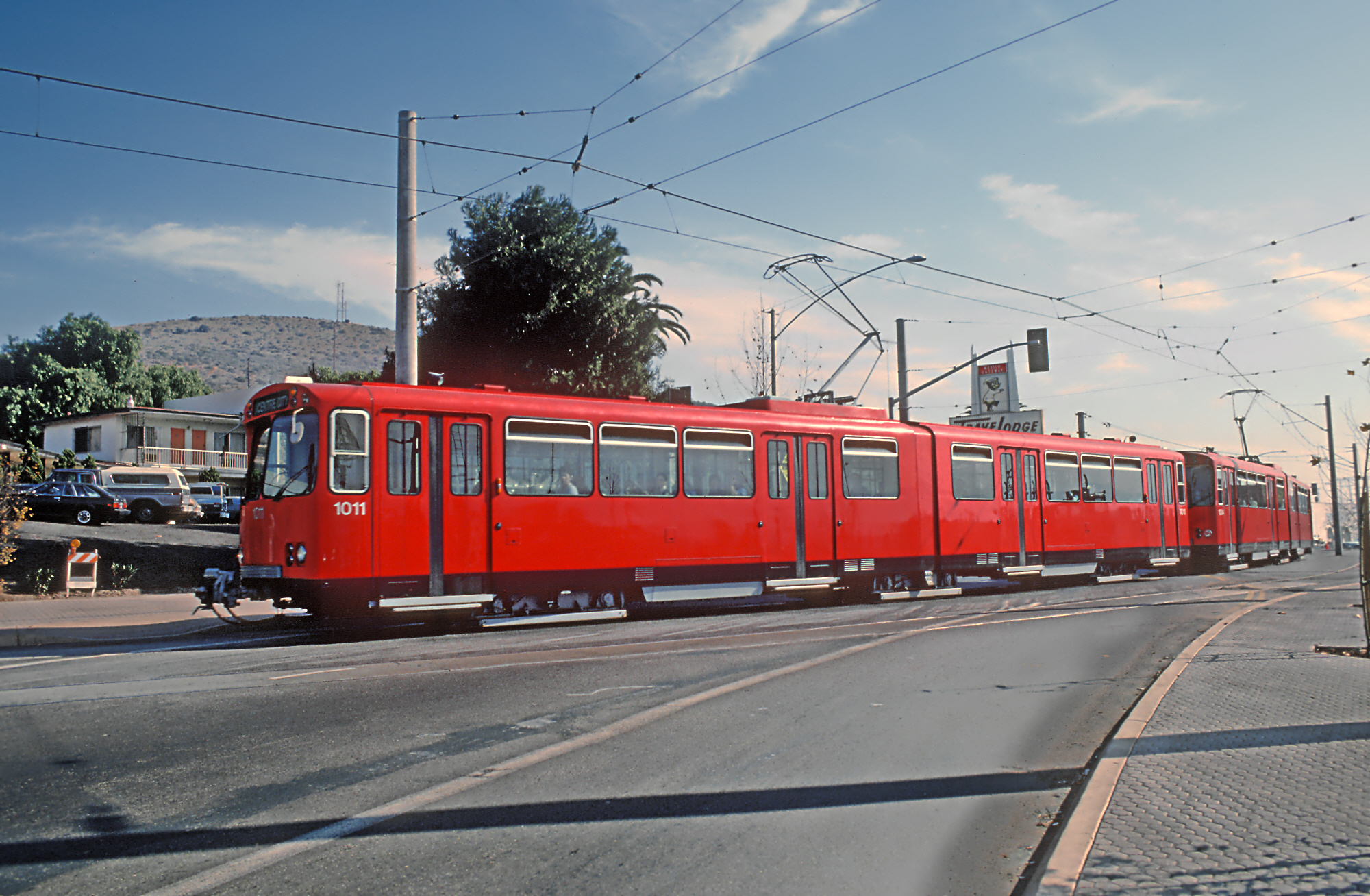
San Diego Trolley in 1982, about six months after opening

In August 1980, the MTDB established San Diego Trolley, Inc. to operate and maintain the new light rail system and on July 26, 1981, service began. Trains operated every 20 minutes (timed to meet at four passing tracks on the single track sections) between 5 am and 9 pm and carried approximately 10,000 passengers a day.

In light of the strong ridership, construction of the second phase was started almost immediately, which involved double-tracking the SD&AE corridor and purchasing 10 additional vehicles. Upon completion of double-tracking in February 1983, the total cost of the project was $116.6 million.

The success of the San Diego Trolley would also spark a nationwide revival of light rail in the late 1980s, with lines built in several other mid-sized cities (Buffalo, Denver, Portland, Sacramento and San Jose).

=== Early expansions ===
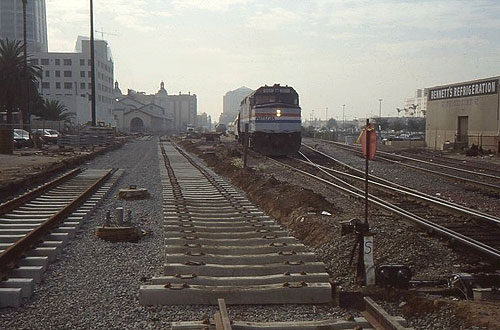
Construction of the Little Italy extension in October 1991

The San Diego Trolley added a second line on March 23, 1986, that shared the same downtown tracks and traveled east to Euclid Avenue on the La Mesa Branch of the SD&AE. The new route was then called the Euclid Line (part of today's Orange Line). This line was extended to El Cajon by June 23, 1989, at which time it was renamed the East Line. The East Line's Bayside Connection extension to the San Diego Convention Center and Gaslamp Quarter opened on June 30, 1990. Service was expanded beyond the old SD&AE right-of-way when the line was extended further, north, to Santee on August 26, 1995.

The South Line was also extended to the north, reaching Little Italy on July 2, 1992, Old Town on June 16, 1996. The system was further expanded east from the Old Town station as the Mission Valley Line, which opened . It proceeded eastward from Old Town to Fashion Valley Mall, Mission Valley Mall, and San Diego Stadium on November 23, 1997. After the completion of the final extension, the South Line (which now traveled well north of downtown San Diego) and East Line of the system were renamed the Blue Line and the Orange Line, respectively.

The Mission Valley East extension, which opened on July 10, 2005, built the only underground station in the system at San Diego State University (SDSU), as well as its highest elevated station at Grantville. This line was then renamed the Green Line. The line also featured the first low-floor trolley vehicles, that allow passengers to board without climbing stairs and allowed passengers using wheelchairs to use a small bridge plate instead of the slower lifts on the older trains. But, the new vehicles could only operate on the Green Line, forcing passengers heading between Mission Valley and downtown San Diego to change trains in Old Town.

=== Trolley Renewal Project ===
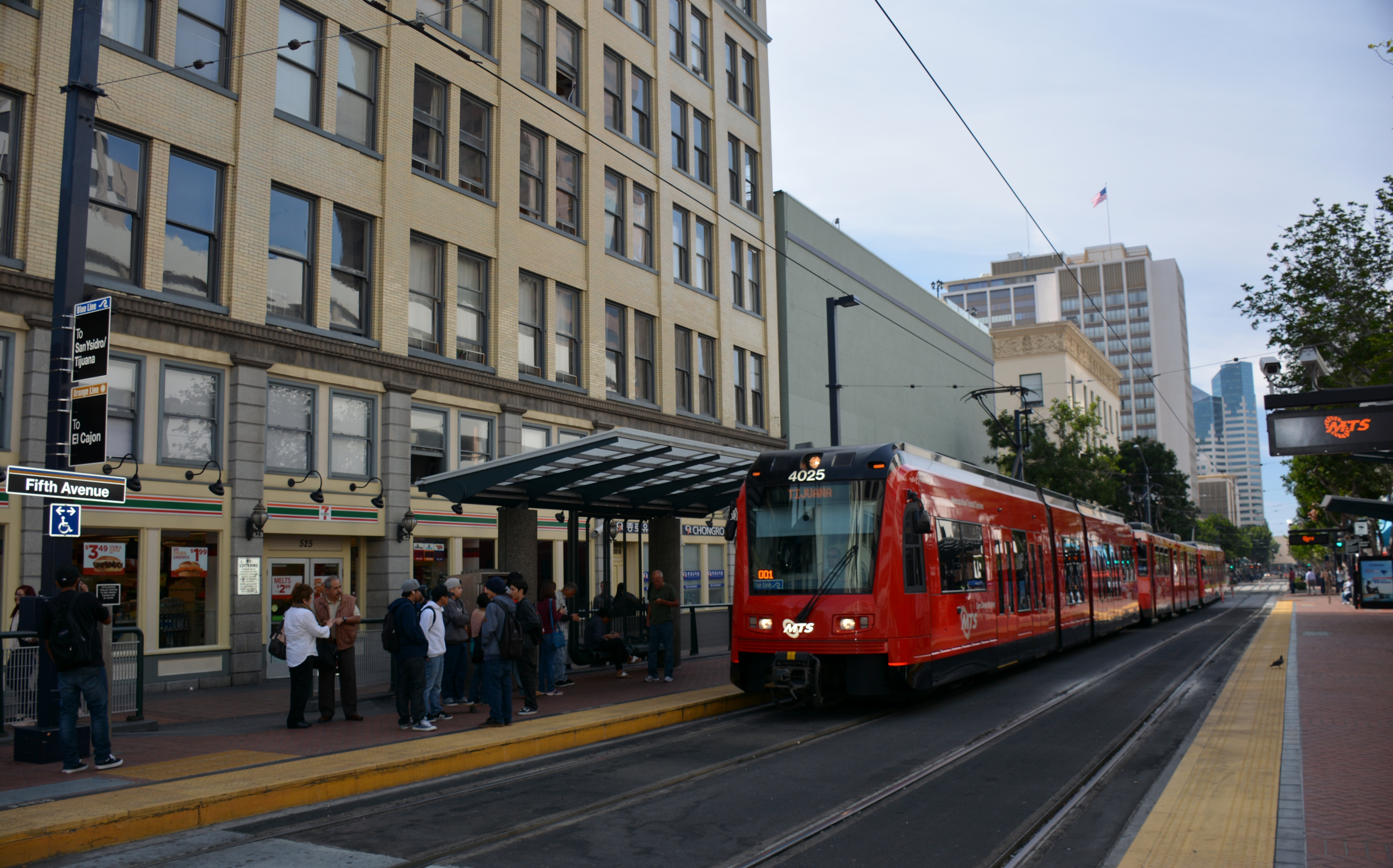
A low-floor trolley operating on the Blue Line at Fifth Avenue station, rebuilt as part of the Trolley Renewal Project.

In the late 2000s, as parts of the San Diego Trolley approached 30 years of operation, the system was in need of an overhaul of its oldest facilities. Also, following the success of the low-floor vehicles on the Green Line, MTS wanted to operate similar vehicles on all lines.

Officials secured $660 million in funding after the 2008 election as voters passed the TransNet half-cent local sales tax and two statewide transportation bond measures. The project also received funding from the American Recovery and Reinvestment Act and federal formula funds.

The "Trolley Renewal Project" included larger shelters to provide more protection from sun and rain, new benches, and digital "next arrival" signs at each station. Worn-out infrastructure such as rails, ties, catenary wires, power lines, and electrical substations were replaced as needed. A new signalling system was also installed, allowing two freight trains to operate at night instead of one.

To accommodate a low-floor light rail vehicle (LRV) fleet, platforms at 35 stations were raised from either ground level or 4-inch (102 mm) sidewalk level to 6 inches (152 mm). Stations also received new "safety edge tiles" with smooth surfaces in the center to permit wheelchair ramps to deploy properly. Another challenge was that the standard Siemens S70 cars, like those ordered for the Green Line, were over 90 feet (27 m) long, preventing three-car trains from fitting within San Diego's 240-foot (73 m) downtown blocks. MTS collaborated with Siemens and the Utah Transit Authority, which faced a similar issue, on a shortened variant, the Siemens S70 US ("Ultra Short"), which retained the low-floor design but matched the length of the older 80-foot (24 m) high-floor cars.

MTS and SANDAG agreed to purchase 65 new vehicles, delivered between September 2011 and January 27, 2015. Funding was insufficient to replace all 123 high-floor cars immediately, so the original Siemens-Duewag U2 LRVs were retired and three-car trains ran with low-floor LRVs at the front and rear and an older high-floor SD-100 in the middle.

Construction to rebuild stations began in late 2010 at Old Town Transit Center and progressed south. By September 2, 2012, work was completed on the Old Town and Bayshore lines, allowing for a service realignment. The Green Line was extended from Old Town to 12th & Imperial Transit Center's Bayside Terminal platform, while the Orange Line was cut back to Santa Fe Depot and the Blue Line to America Plaza. The new alignment sent all lines through downtown and established a universal transfer point at 12th & Imperial.

By January 9, 2013, all stations on the Orange Line had been rebuilt, allowing low-floor LRVs to operate on that line. Reconstruction of the remaining stations on the Blue Line was completed by January 27, 2015. The overall project, including station and track renovations, was completed in late 2015.

=== Mid-Coast Trolley extension project ===
In 2011, SANDAG received key approval for the Mid-coast extension of the Blue Line, running from Old Town 11 miles (17.7 km) north to the University City community, serving major activity and employment centers such as Mission Bay Park, the University of California, San Diego campus, three major hospitals, and Westfield UTC mall. Construction began in October 2016, and the line opened on November 21, 2021.

The Blue Line was re-extended north from its northern terminus at America Plaza to run through five existing stations (up to and including its pre-2012 terminus, the Old Town Transit Center), and continuing to the nine new Mid-Coast Trolley stations: Tecolote Road, Clairemont Drive, Balboa Avenue, Nobel Drive, VA Medical Center, UC San Diego Central Campus, UC San Diego Health La Jolla, Executive Drive, and UTC Transit Center, the site of a large bus transfer center.

=== Copper Line ===
In early 2024, MTS proposed truncating the eastern termini of the Green and Orange lines to El Cajon Transit Center and replacing service east of El Cajon with a new Copper Line shuttle to Santee. The proposal addressed longstanding operational issues on the single-track section down Cuyamaca Street, where trains often faced delays and occasionally were forced to turn back early at Gillespie Field station. To accommodate the shuttle, a third track and platform were added at El Cajon. The MTS board approved the plan on July 18, 2024, and Copper Line service began on September 29, 2024.

== Current service ==
=== Lines ===
As of 2024, trolley service operates on four daily lines: the Blue, Green, Orange, and Copper lines, and traveling through 65 total miles of mostly double-track rail and serving 62 stations. A fifth line, the heritage streetcar Silver Line, operates more limited weekday and weekend service, in a clockwise 'circle-loop' around downtown San Diego only (this is an overlay of existing parts of other lines in downtown). Additionally, the San Diego Trolley operates Special Event Line service in late July, to serve the San Diego Comic-Con.

Line	Opening	Length	Stations	Southern/Western Termini	Northern/Eastern Termini	Operation
Blue Line	1981	26.3 mi (42.3 km)	32	San Ysidro Transit Center	UTC Transit Center	Daily
Orange Line	1986	17.1 mi (27.5 km)	19	Courthouse station	El Cajon Transit Center	Daily
Green Line	2005	19.8 mi (31.9 km)	27	12th & Imperial Transit Center	El Cajon Transit Center	Daily
Silver Line	2011	2.7 mi (4.3 km)	9	12th & Imperial Transit Center (clockwise loop around Downtown San Diego)		Holidays
Special Event Line	2022	8.3 mi (13.4 km)	12	12th & Imperial Transit Center	Balboa Avenue Transit Center	Comic-Con
Copper Line	2024	3.8 mi (6.1 km)	4	El Cajon Transit Center	Santee station	Daily

Current trolley system as of 2024

=== Stations ===
The San Diego Trolley system has 62 operational stations serving its three major Trolley lines (Blue, Green, and Orange), as well as the Copper Line shuttle and limited-service Silver Line.

Thirteen of the trolley system's stations operate as transfer stations, which allow passengers to transfer between lines. 12th & Imperial Transit Center allows for transferring between the Blue, Green, and Orange lines, serving as a universal transfer point for most riders in the system. The adjacent Santa Fe Depot/America Plaza/Courthouse stations, which are within walking distance of each other, also allow for transfer among the three major lines. Since the opening of the Copper Line, riders bound for Arnele Avenue, Gillespie Field, or Santee must transfer at El Cajon Transit Center. Six trolley stations are end-of-line stations: 12th & Imperial Transit Center, Courthouse, El Cajon Transit Center, Santee, San Ysidro Transit Center, and UTC Transit Center. Thirty-seven stations are within the city limits of San Diego, serving various neighborhoods in San Diego; the other stations are located in the cities of Chula Vista, El Cajon, La Mesa, Lemon Grove, National City, and Santee.

Most of the stations in the San Diego Trolley system are 'at-grade' stations. There are 10 aerial stations, mostly on the Blue Line, with some on the Green Line. For the Blue Line, these are Nobel Drive, VA Medical Center, UC San Diego Central Campus, UC San Diego Health La Jolla, Executive Drive, and UTC Transit Center. For the Green Line, these are Fashion Valley Transit Center, Stadium, Mission San Diego, and Grantville. There is just one trolley station in the system that is underground – SDSU Transit Center – also on the Green Line.

About half of San Diego Trolley stations offer free park and ride lots. Most trolley stations offer connections to MTS bus lines.

=== Hours of operation ===
The San Diego Trolley's four main lines operate regular service between 5 am and 11:30 pm, seven days a week. Limited service on particular segments is provided before 5 am and after 11:30 pm. There is no rail service between 2 am and 4 am. During these hours when there is no passenger service, freight trains of the San Diego and Imperial Valley Railroad operate on the trolley's right of way.

Generally, trains operate every 15 minutes, seven days a week, with less frequent service during early morning and late evening hours. Additional service on the Blue Line between America Plaza and San Ysidro boosts frequency to every 7.5 minutes during weekdays.

==== Overnight Express bus ====
On January 26, 2025, the MTS established bus route 910, an "Overnight Express" bus operating on the southern section of the Blue Line from midnight to 5 A.M., when the Blue Line is not running. Route 910 operates between Santa Fe Depot and San Ysidro Transit Center, with intermediate stops at the City College, 12th & Imperial, 24th Street, Palomar Street, and Iris Avenue transit centers.

=== Fares and fare collection ===
The San Diego Trolley operates on a proof-of-payment system. Passengers must have proof of fare (ticket or pass) before boarding. Self-serve ticket-vending machines located at each station sell one-way paper tickets and passes (one day and monthly) on the Pronto Card. (An older fare card that was used was the Compass Card.)

Roving transit enforcement personnel conduct random ticket inspections throughout the system. If customers are caught without a valid fare, they may be fined. Based on frequent security inspections, nearly 98% of the 37 million patrons have proper fares.

One-way fares are good for up to two hours from the time of purchase, costs $3. The fare does include a transfer to other routes, as long as it is within two hours from the time of purchase.

One-day and monthly passes are sold on the Pronto Card. The card itself costs $2, and fares are loaded on to it as needed for the different transit systems within San Diego County (including the San Diego Trolley, MTS Bus, MTS Rapid buses, NCTD Breeze buses, and the NCTD Sprinter (a light rail line in North San Diego County). More expensive premium passes include access to the NCTD Coaster commuter rail service, MTS Rapid Express, and MTS Rural buses.

Pronto cards are linked to an account which can store value to be used at any time. The Pronto card uses the "best fare," which is similar to pay-as-you-go. The card will automatically deduct a one-way fare each time it is tapped, and will cap the total fare deducted in a day to the limit of a Day Pass, which is $7. Pronto will also cap the total monthly fare to the same price as a Month Pass, which is $85.

Starting October 1, 2026, the fares have been increased to help support the rising operation and maintenance costs. The one-way adult regional fare has increased from $2.5 to $3. The adult regional day pass has increased from $6 to $7. The adult regional month pass has increased from $72 to $85. They have also planned to increase the fare again on October 1, 2027.

The Pronto card must be tapped on a Pronto Card validator (located just outside the paid area of stations), or the QR code must be scanned from within the Pronto App when entering and transferring within the system in order to be validated.

=== Ridership ===
Average Weekday Ridership
Year	Quarter	Ridership	%±
1996	Q1	47,000	—
1996	Q2^{1}	47,300	+0.6%
1996	Q3	53,500	+13.1%
1996	Q4	46,800	–12.5%
1997	Q1	52,000	+11.1%
1997	Q2	56,400	+12.3%
1997	Q3	60,300	+3.3%
1997	Q4^{2}	57,400	–4.8%
1998	Q1	69,400	+20.9%
1998	Q2	77,300	+11.4%
1998	Q3	71,000	–8.2%
1998	Q4	69,300	–2.4%
1999	Q1	63,300	–8.7%
1999	Q2	72,800	+15.0%
1999	Q3	79,000	+8.5%
1999	Q4	81,300	+2.9%
2000	Q1	85,600	+5.3%
2000	Q2	88,000	+2.8%
2000	Q3	94,300	+7.2%
2000	Q4	82,600	–12.4%
2001	Q1	79,600	−3.6%
2001	Q2	82,600	+3.8%
2001	Q3	78,800	−4.6%
2001	Q4	71,600	−9.1%
2002	Q1	71,100	−0.7%
2002	Q2	77,200	+8.6%
2002	Q3	74,400	−3.6%
2002	Q4	71,300	−4.2%
2003	Q1	73,100	+2.5%
2003	Q2	74,700	+2.2%
2003	Q3	76,700	+2.7%
2003	Q4	70,100	−8.6%
2004	Q1	74,700	+6.6%
2004	Q2	88,400	+18.3%
2004	Q3	94,500	+6.9%
2004	Q4	81,700	−13.5%
2005	Q1	80,000	−2.1%
2005	Q2	94,200	+17.8%
2005	Q3^{3}	104,900	+11.4%
2005	Q4	n/a	n/a
2006	Q1	95,800	—
2006	Q2	100,900	+5.3%
2006	Q3	107,300	+6.3%
2006	Q4	105,100	−2.1%
2007	Q1	96,700	−8.0%
2007	Q2	107,000	+10.7%
2007	Q3	124,300	+16.2%
2007	Q4	118,400	−4.7%
2008	Q1	98,700	−16.6%
2008	Q2	113,300	+14.8%
2008	Q3	114,900	+1.4%
2008	Q4	103,900	−9.6%
2009	Q1	96,000	−8.1%
2009	Q2	93,300	−2.3%
2009	Q3	93,100	−0.2%
2009	Q4	91,200	−2.0%
2010	Q1	86,100	−5.6%
2010	Q2	94,700	+10.0%
2010	Q3	92,100	−2.7%
2010	Q4	90,000	−2.3%
2011	Q1	98,000	+8.9%
2011	Q2	96,800	−1.2%
2011	Q3	133,400^{†}	+37.8%^{†}
2011	Q4	103,400	−22.5%^{†}
2012	Q1	96,900	−6.3%
2012	Q2	94,300	−2.7%
2012	Q3	95,700	+1.5%
2012	Q4	87,700	−8.4%
2013	Q1	80,100	−8.7%
2013	Q2	89,400	+11.6%
2013	Q3	121,900	+36.4%
2013	Q4	122,400	+0.4%
2014	Q1	120,600	−1.5%
2014	Q2	120,100	−0.4%
2014	Q3	124,100	+3.3%
2014	Q4	119,800	−3.5%
^†The weekday average ridership figure for the San Diego Trolley from the Q3 2011 APTA Report is likely a typo, based on the other ridership figures for that Quarter – it is more likely that Q3 2011 figure is supposed to be 103,400.
^1The extension from Little Italy to Old Town opened in late-Q2 1996.^2The "Mission Valley West" extension from Old Town to Mission San Diego open in mid-Q4 1997.^3The "Mission Valley East" extension from Mission San Diego to La Mesa, along with the accompanying inauguration of the Green Line, opened in mid-Q3 2005.

As of the Fourth Quarter (Q4) of 2013, the average weekday ridership on the San Diego Trolley system was 119,800, making it the fourth busiest Light rail system in the United States. Taking overall track length into consideration, the San Diego Trolley transported 2,239 daily passengers per route mile in Q4 2014, making it the twelfth busiest Light rail system on a per mile basis over this time period. Weekday ridership on the trolley has been relatively high since Q3 2013 (see table at right).

In all of 2014, the San Diego Trolley provided 39,731,900 unlinked passenger transits according to the American Public Transportation Association (APTA). MTS reported that there were 39,694,197 trips on the trolley in Fiscal Year 2014 (FY 2014), a 34% increase over Fiscal Year 2013. Of the trolley's three lines, the Blue Line has the system's highest ridership with 15,094,878 riders during FY 2014, followed by the Green Line with 13,673,926 FY 2014 riders, and the Orange Line with 10,896,289 FY 2014 riders. The Silver Line, operating only mid-days just four days a week (and with some service interruptions during the year), carried 29,104 passengers around the downtown loop in FY2014.

Annual Ridership
Year	Total Unlinked Passenger Trips on San Diego Trolley
2004	28,772,400
2005	32,132,400
2006	34,380,500
2007	36,386,100
2008	36,054,600
2009	31,337,500
2010	30,514,700
2011	32,748,700
2012	31,206,900
2013	34,448,900
2014	39,731,900
2015	40,028,500
2016	39,614,000
2017	37,639,900
2018	37,215,800
2019	38,047,300
2020	21,729,600
2021	23,485,700

According to figures from APTA, previous to 2014, the San Diego Trolley achieved the highest level of ridership in 2007, when there were 36,386,100 unlinked passenger transits on the system over that entire year. The trolley system's highest average weekday ridership of 124,300 was achieved in Q3 2007 – this corresponded to 2,323 passengers per route mile daily.

== Proposed extensions ==
=== Proposed Balboa Park streetcar line ===
MTS began work in March 2011 on a study to evaluate the feasibility of reconnecting Balboa Park, the San Diego Zoo and downtown San Diego through a fixed-guideway, electrified streetcar line – the final study on the subject was published in October 2012. The project study corridor runs between the City College Trolley Station area, and Balboa Park in the vicinity of the San Diego Zoo. An alignment similar to the proposed one was last served by a streetcar system in 1949 on lines 7 (Park Boulevard-University Avenue to East San Diego) & 11 (Park Boulevard-Adams Avenue to Kensington). The Committee evaluated what types of streetcars to use for this proposed line, the possible options including the recently ordered 57 Ultra Short 2011 S70s in the "Modern Streetcar" category, and the restored PCC Streetcars from the downtown Silver Line in the "Vintage Streetcar" category. The major construction issues were how to cross I-5 without having to reconstruct the entire bridge, and how to make the construction strong enough to support the full weight of heavier light rail trains (for possible line extension). No low-cost solution to this problem was identified. The estimated cost for construction of this line was $68.2 million, with each trolley car estimated to cost between $850,000 (for a restored PCC trolley car) to $3.6 million (for a modern trolley car). Four cars are anticipated for service on this line. No funding sources were identified. No further action on this proposal has taken place since the October 2012 release of the study.

=== Proposed airport extension ===
One of the biggest gaps in the San Diego Trolley system is the lack of a connection to San Diego International Airport. The MTS acknowledges that surveys and outreach show that the extension is one of the most desired projects among the public, but that extending the trolley to the airport presents significant engineering challenges and would be costly.

Current transit service to the airport is provided by MTS bus 992, which connects to Santa Fe Depot and City College station, two major transit hubs downtown. Additionally, the airport operates two shuttles: the San Diego Flyer, which stops at the Old Town Transit Center, and a rental car shuttle, which stops near the Middletown station. Both shuttles serve all airport terminals.

As part of the project to build a new Terminal 1 at the airport, a "transit-ready" area was constructed to accommodate a future trolley or people mover station near the terminal entrance.

Over the years, several proposals have been made, with the most recent being SANDAG's Central Mobility Hub study. The study reviewed seven Airport Transit Connection concepts to connect the airport to the trolley system and the rest of the city:

- Concept 1: This simplest proposal would construct a people mover between the rental car center and the airport, with an intermediate stop at Middletown station. Some sub-concepts include building platforms along the Surf Line for Pacific Surfliner and Coaster trains or a direct access ramp to I-5, allowing for an off-site passenger pickup/drop-off area to be built. This concept mirrors the current rental car shuttle.
- Concept 2: This variant eliminates the Middletown stop and extends the people mover to the Old Town Transit Center, largely mirroring the current San Diego Flyer bus route.
- Concepts 3, 4, and 5: Would retain the people mover alignment from Concept 1 and add a second route into the city center. Concept 3 would end at Santa Fe Depot, Concept 4 would also include the Convention Center, and Concept 5 would swap the Convention Center stop for one in the Civic Center/Core neighborhood.
- Concept 6: Would build a trolley spur from the airport to the existing tracks between the Middletown and County Center/Little Italy stations, mirroring a 2019 concept from MTS included in a cancelled transit tax proposal.
- Concept 7: Would upgrade the existing MTS 992 and San Diego Flyer bus routes by providing dedicated transit lanes.

=== Proposed Purple Line ===
The Purple Line is a proposed San Diego Trolley line that would run from San Ysidro Transit Center at the United States–Mexico border to Kearny Mesa with a possible extension to Carmel Valley. It would run along, or close to I-805 and I-15.

In April 2011, the San Diego Association of Governments (SANDAG) released a draft of its 2050 Regional Transportation Plan, which was approved by the SANDAG Board of Directors on October 28, 2011. An inland trolley line from San Ysidro to Kearny Mesa, though not yet called the Purple Line, was included in the plan.

In 2016, SANDAG had a measure on the ballot to fund development of the Purple Line. It failed to pass.

In April 2019, MTS again included the Purple Line in a final version of a November ballot initiative to increase the countywide sales tax by a half-cent to fund future transit plans. In April 2020, MTS decided not to pursue the transit tax ballot initiative.

=== Cross-Border Trolley and other project at San Ysidro ===
Although the current Blue Line ends at San Ysidro Transit Center, just north of the Mexico–United States border, future plans for the Blue Line to continue into Tijuana are awaiting approval. If it is to be made, the Blue Line would be extended 1 mile or 1.5 miles on an elevated trackage into a new Tijuana station. This proposal for a "Cross-Border Trolley", supported by SANDAG and officials in Baja California, could take 8 years to complete.

=== Other projects ===
Additionally, the 2021 SANDAG regional plan contains proposals for additional rail lines to be implemented by 2050. These include a tram line (known simply as "Tram 555") from downtown to Hillcrest via Logan Heights; Commuter Rail 581 and 581B, connecting El Cajon to downtown and the Central Mobility Hub (a proposed transit center at San Diego International Airport), respectively; and Commuter Rail 583, which will connect the Central Mobility Hub with San Ysidro.

As of 2025, however, Commuter Rail 581 and 581B have been removed from the plan, with Tram 555 still being considered.

Tram 555

Commuter Rail

== Fleet ==
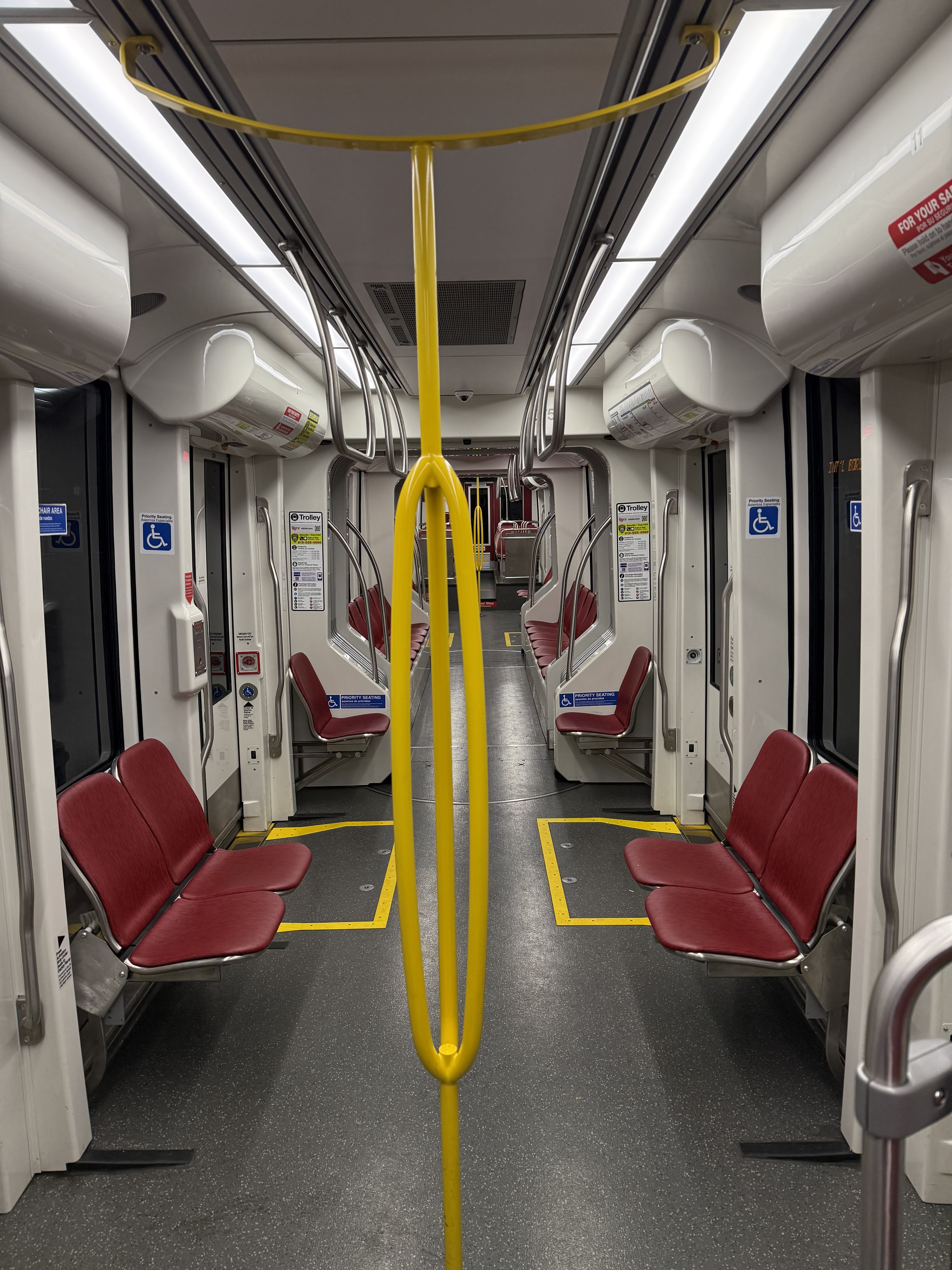
5000 Series Trolley Interior

The San Diego Trolley operates with an all-Siemens fleet of light-rail vehicles (LRVs) on its main lines. It also runs two "heritage" PCC streetcars on the Silver Line, a downtown-only service with a limited schedule.

When the system opened in 1981, it used high-floor Siemens–Duewag U2 vehicles originally designed for the Frankfurt U-Bahn. At the time, no purpose-built LRVs were manufactured for the North American market, so the model was adapted for San Diego and systems in Canada. A total of 71 cars were delivered in four batches as the Trolley expanded: nos. 1001–1014 in 1980, 1015–1024 in 1982, 1025–1030 in 1985, and 1031–1071 by 1989. Built in West Germany, later units were assembled with support from a Siemens' facility in Florin, California, which opened in 1984. The U2 cars were retired between 2010 and 2015. Eleven were sold to the Metrotranvía Mendoza in 2010, 29 were retired after the Orange Line platforms were rebuilt for low-floor LRVs in 2013, and the remainder after the Blue Line platforms were rebuilt in January 2015. Six cars have been preserved: no. 1001 by MTS for the Silver Line, nos. 1003 and 1008 at the Southern California Railway Museum, nos. 1017 and 1018 at the Western Railway Museum, and no. 1019 at the Rockhill Trolley Museum. Car 1035 was sold in 2020 to the Memphis Area Transit Authority, which operates a vintage-trolley system and plans to use the LRV to test modern, higher-capacity vehicles on its Madison Avenue Line.

In 1995, the Trolley acquired 52 high-floor Siemens SD-100 vehicles, an updated model designed specifically for the North American market. Starting with this order, all of San Diego's future LRVs would be built entirely in California. The SD-100s were retired from service in 2023.

The transition to low-floor vehicles began in 2005 with the opening of the Green Line and the introduction of 11 Siemens S70 cars. Their design required slightly higher platforms, restricting their use to the new line. They were also 9.34 feet (2.85 m) longer than the SD-100s, preventing three-car trains from fitting within a downtown block; as a result, they continue to operate only on the Green Line, which does not enter downtown, and the East County Copper Line on weekends. In 2009, MTS ordered 65 Siemens S70 US ("Ultra Short") vehicles, which retained the low-floor design but matched the SD-100's length. In 2016, the agency ordered 45 Siemens S700 US cars with redesigned center sections that have longitudinal (aisle facing) seating to address complaints about the S70's cramped layout that limited passenger circulation. An additional 25 S700 US cars were ordered in 2019 and delivered by the end of 2021.

Current rail fleet
Image	Model	Fleet numbers (Qty.)	Entered service	Notes
	Siemens S70	3001–3011 (11)	July 2005	First low-floor trolley cars in system; restricted to Green and Copper Line service due to length
	Siemens S70 US	4001–4065 (65)	2011	
	Siemens S700 US	5001–5092 (92)	5001–5045: April 2019; 5046–5070: November 2021; 5071–5092: 2024	5045 dedicated to late CEO Paul Jablonski.
	PCC streetcar	529, 530 (2)	August 2011 (529); March 2015 (530)	Used on Silver Line; Both are ex-San Francisco Muni cars, painted in San Diego Electric Railway (SDER) livery Numbering is a continuation beyond 528, the last original SDER streetcar
	Siemens-Duewag U2	1001 (1)	July 1981	Used on Silver Line; First vehicle purchased for the San Diego Trolley

=== Specifications ===
Below are the technical specifications of the system's three primary series of light rail vehicles:

Specification	Siemens S70	Siemens S70 US	Siemens S700 US
Manufacturer	Siemens (Florin, California)		
Type	Double-ended articulated car, 6 axle, multiple-unit operation to 5 cars		
Height (top of car to rail)	12.4 ft (3,780 mm)		
Center aisle floor height	15 in (381 mm)		
Width (exterior)	8.7 ft (2,652 mm)		
Length (end to end)	88.5 ft (26,975 mm)	79.2 ft (24,140 mm)	
Length (over coupler faces)	90.7 ft (27,645 mm)	81.4 ft (24,811 mm)	
Weight (empty)	97,900 lb (44,407 kg)	96,000 lb (43,545 kg)	
Braking	Full dynamic braking from top speed down to 3 miles per hour (4.8 km/h) with traction motors acting as generators, fades when speed reduced to approx. 1/2–3 mph (0.8–4.8 km/h). Friction braking completes the stop.		
Speed	Design: 65 mph (104.6 km/h) maximum, Operational: 55 mph (88.5 km/h) limit		
Traction power	Overhead line, 600 V DC		
Power requirements	550 kW to accelerate from a stationary position, 130 kW to maintain speed.		
Passenger capacity	Seated: 68 (56 with 4 wheelchairs); Maximum: 200	Seated: 60 (52 with 4 wheelchairs); Maximum: 150	Seated: 58 (50 with 4 wheelchairs); Maximum: 150
Doors	Eight double sliding doors per car, four per side. Opened by operator and/or individually activated by passenger pushing button after locks released by operator.		
Wheelchair access	Bridge plates on center doors		

== See also ==
- San Diego and Arizona Eastern Railway
- San Diego Electric Railway
- San Diego Metropolitan Transit System
- San Diego MTS bus system
- Santa Fe Depot (aka. Union Station)
- Coaster (rail service)
- Pacific Surfliner
- List of United States light rail systems by ridership
- List of rail transit systems in the United States
- Light rail in the United States
- List of North American light rail systems by ridership
- Light rail in North America
- North County Transit District
- Sprinter (rail service)
- Transportation in San Diego County
- Transportation in San Diego
