= UTC Transit Center =

San Diego Trolley and bus station

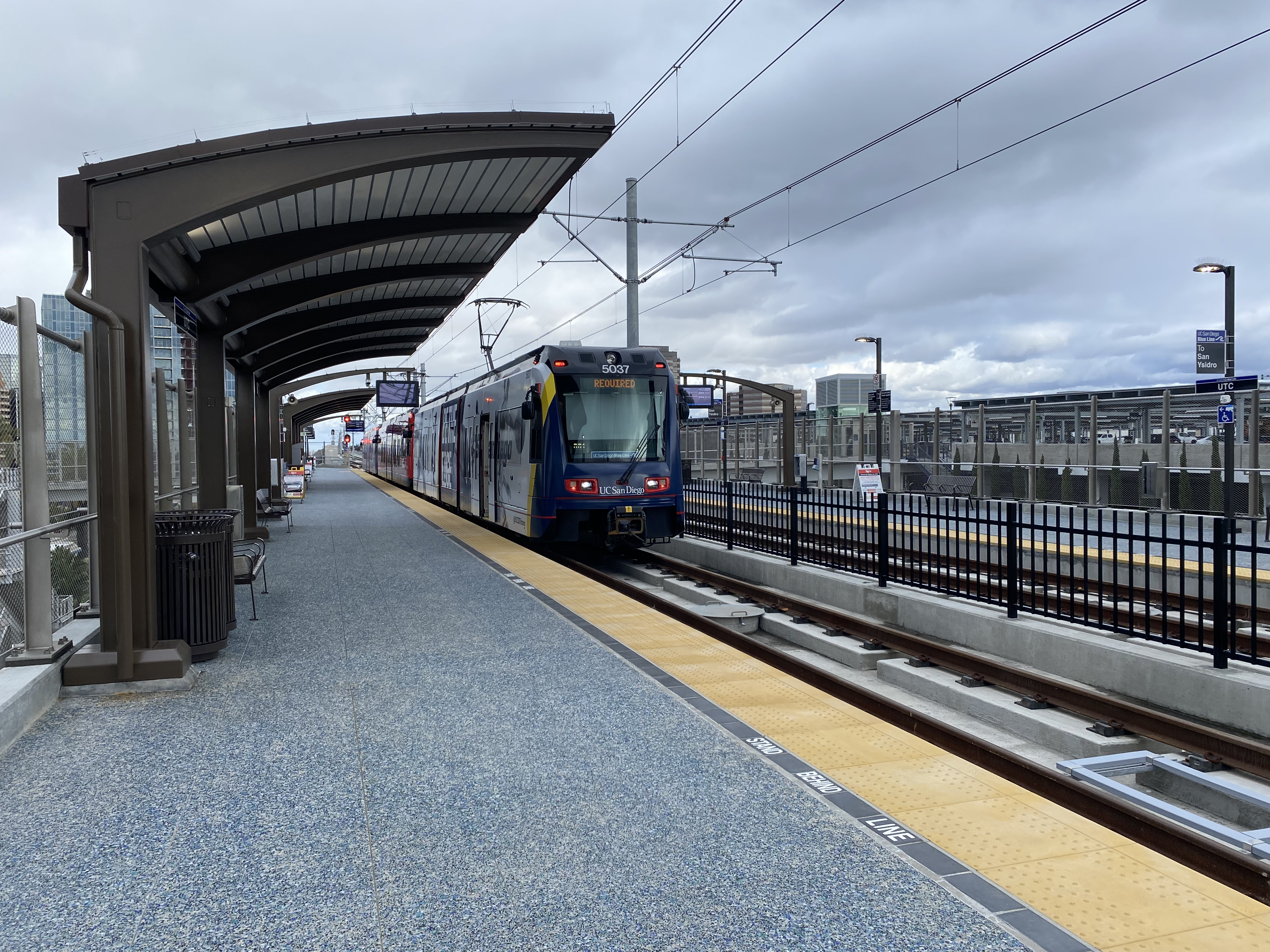
- UTC Transit Center trolley platform In December 2021

General information
- Location: 4545 La Jolla Village Drive; San Diego, California; United States
- Coordinates: 32°52′09″N 117°12′50″W
- Owner: San Diego Metropolitan Transit System
- Operator: San Diego Trolley
- Platforms: 2 side platforms
- Tracks: 2
- Connections: MTS: 30, 31, 41, 60, 105, 30, Rapid 201, Rapid 202, Rapid 204, 921; NCTD: 101

Construction
- Structure type: Elevated
- Parking: 333 spaces, paid
- Cycle facilities: 40 space parking station
- Accessible: Disabled access

Other information
- Station code: 77787

History
- Opened: October 27, 2017
- Rebuilt: 2021

Services
Preceding station	San Diego Trolley	Following station
Terminus	Blue Line	Executive Drive toward San Ysidro
Preceding station	Rapid	Following station
La Jolla Village Dr & Regents Rd Next clockwise (202)	SuperLoop 201/202	Nobel Dr & Regents Rd Next counter-clockwise (201)
Genesee Av & La Jolla Village Dr Next clockwise	SuperLoop 204	Nobel Dr & Towne Centre Dr One-way operation
Location

UTC Transit Center is a San Diego Trolley station and transportation hub in the University City district of San Diego, California. It is located at Westfield UTC mall. The station's elevated trolley platform is served by the Blue Line, and stands above Genesee Avenue at its intersection with Esplanade Court. Its at-grade bus plaza is built into the lower level of one of the mall's parking structures that includes 333 spaces that can be used by transit customers who pay an hourly fee.

Bus service began at the transit center on October 27, 2017, and trolley service began four years later on November 21, 2021, as the new terminus of the Blue Line; it was constructed as part of the Mid-Coast Trolley extension project.
