= Santee station =

San Diego Trolley station

Santee
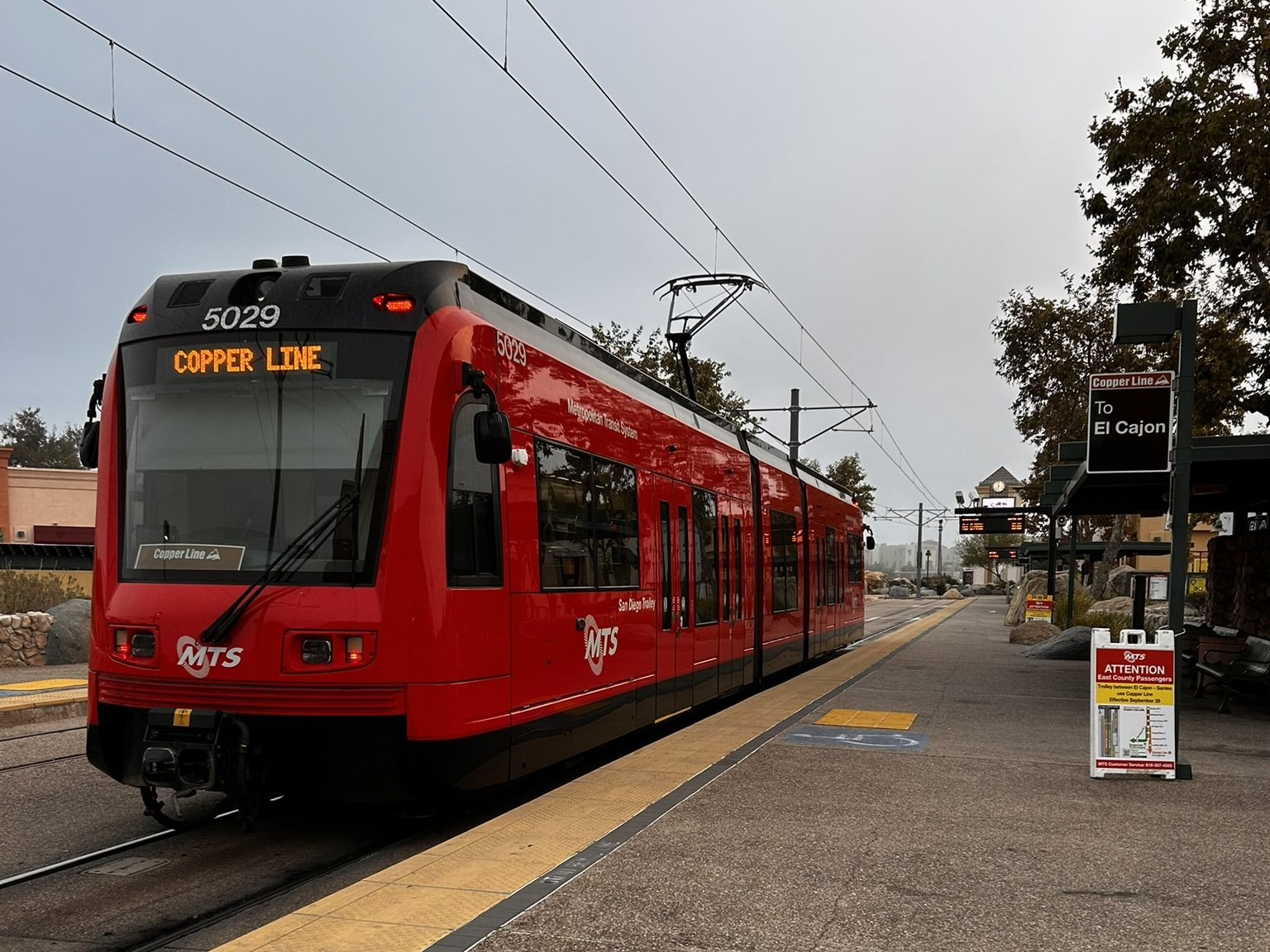
- Copper Line trolley at Santee station, September 2024

General information
- Other names: Santee Town Center
- Location: 152 Civic Center Drive; El Cajon, California; United States
- Coordinates: 32°50′32″N 116°58′51″W
- Owner: San Diego Metropolitan Transit System
- Operator: San Diego Trolley
- Platforms: 2 side platforms
- Tracks: 2
- Connections: MTS: 832, 833, 834

Construction
- Structure type: At-grade
- Parking: Yes, number of spaces varies
- Cycle facilities: 8 rack spaces, 2 lockers
- Accessible: Disabled access

Other information
- Station code: 75020

History
- Opened: July 26, 1995
- Rebuilt: 2005

Services
Preceding station	San Diego Trolley	Following station
Gillespie Field toward El Cajon	Copper Line	Terminus
Former services
Preceding station	San Diego Trolley	Following station
Gillespie Field toward 12th & Imperial	Green Line 2005–2024	Terminus
Gillespie Field toward 12th & Imperial	Orange Line 1995–2005	Terminus
Location

Santee station (also known as Santee Town Center station (Note: The San Diego MTS's "Departures and Schedules" page lists "Santee Town Center Station" or "Santee Center" as a stop on the Copper Line and bus routes 832, 833, and 834)) is a station on the Copper Line of the San Diego Trolley, in the San Diego suburb of Santee, California. The station currently serves as the Copper Line's northern terminus and serves as a major park and ride station. It is located inside a shopping center on the northeast corner of the intersection of Mission Gorge Road and Cuyamaca Street.

== History ==
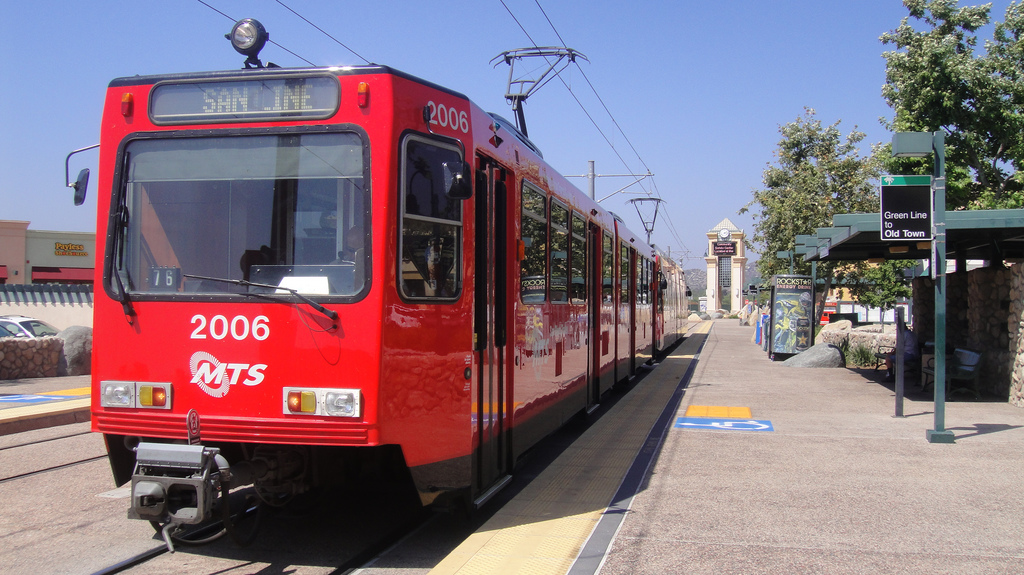
Green Line trolley at Santee, 2009

Santee station opened on August 26, 1995, as the new terminus of the East Line (renamed the Orange Line in 1997), marking the fourth segment to open on the line. In 2005, the Orange Line was truncated to Gillespie Field (and later El Cajon) and service to Santee was replaced by the Green Line. The truncation was originally due to the fact that the path between Gillespie Field and Santee Town Center is single tracked, and having two lines running on that route would cause operational issues.

Until September 2005, Santee city law prohibited rail service after 9:00 p.m., meaning that most evening service terminated at El Cajon. The law was lifted in September 2005, soon after the Green Line began operation to Santee.

To further reduce operational issues on the single track between Gillespie Field and Santee, the Copper Line began service on September 29, 2024, and the Green Line was also truncated back to El Cajon.

== See also ==
- List of San Diego Trolley stations
