= San Diego Metropolitan Transit System =

Public transportation agency in Southern San Diego County, California

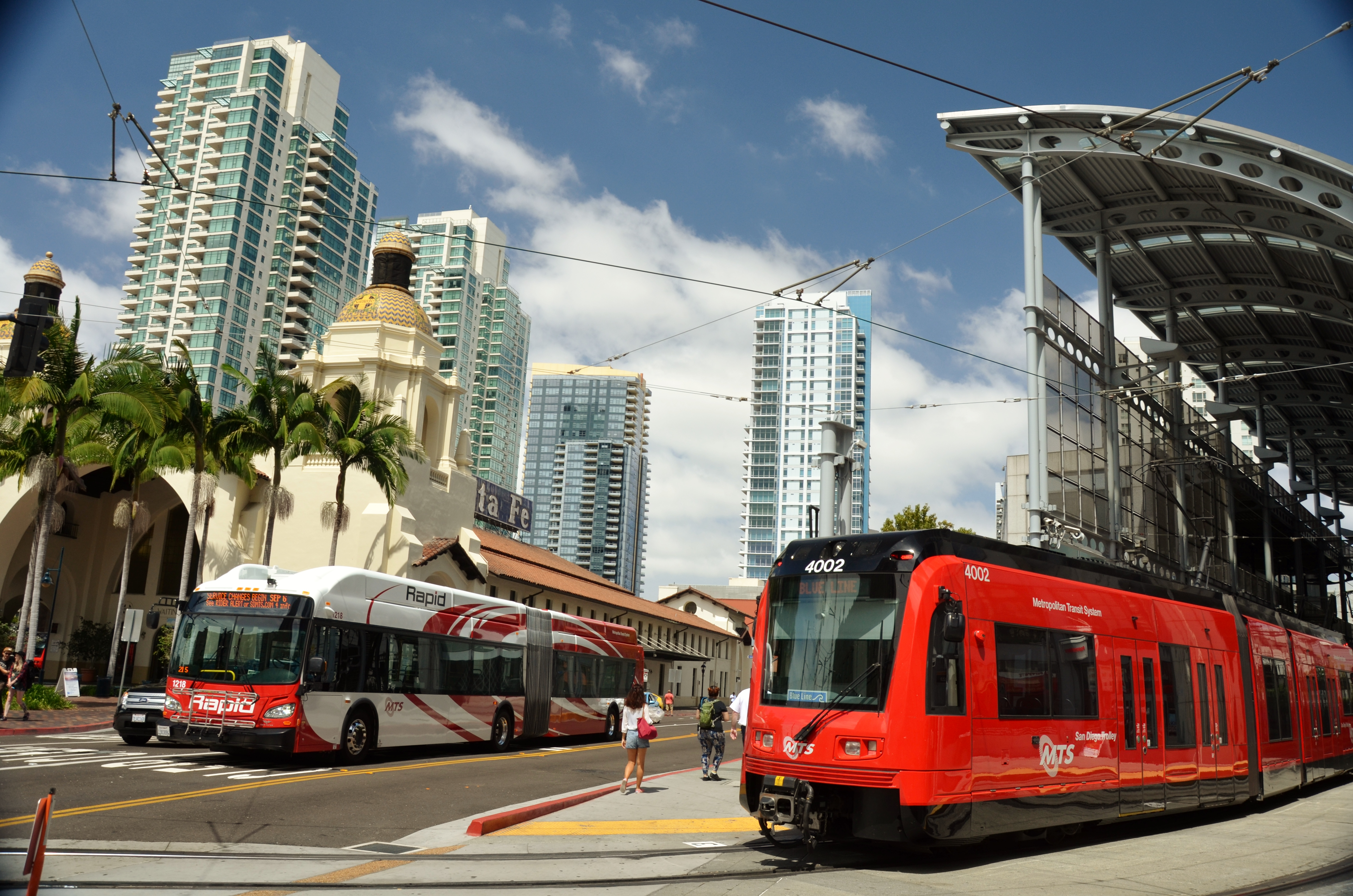
- A Rapid bus departs Santa Fe Depot station (left) while a Blue Line train of the San Diego Trolley loads passengers at America Plaza station. The stations are a major MTS hub in downtown San Diego.

Overview
- Locale: Southern San Diego County, California
- Transit type: Buses, Bus rapid transit, Light rail, Paratransit
- Number of lines: 4 light rail lines 95 bus routes
- Number of stations: 62 light rail stations
- Daily ridership: 261,700 (weekdays, Q2 2026)
- Annual ridership: 79,000,200 (2025)
- Chief executive: Sharon Cooney
- Headquarters: James R. Mills Building; 1255 Imperial Avenue; San Diego, CA
- Website: sdmts.com

Operation
- Operators: San Diego Trolley, Inc. San Diego Transit Corp. Transdev

The San Diego Metropolitan Transit System (MTS) is a public transit service provider for San Diego County, California. The agency operates a transit system that includes the San Diego MTS bus system, San Diego Trolley, and Rapid (bus rapid transit). MTS also controls the San Diego and Arizona Eastern (SD&AE) freight railway and regulates taxicabs, jitneys, and other private for-hire passenger transportation services.

MTS is one of the oldest transit systems in Southern California, with predecessors dating back as early as the 1880s. The current agency started operations in 1976 as the San Diego Metropolitan Transit Development Board (MTDB) and changed to its current name in 2005.

MTS works closely with the North County Transit District (NCTD), which operates public transit services in Northern San Diego County, and the San Diego Association of Governments (SANDAG), which plans, develops, and constructs transit projects for both MTS and NCTD.

== History ==
=== Origins ===
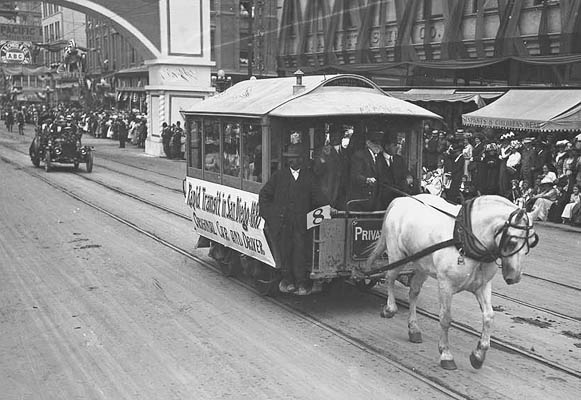
An original 1886 horse-drawn trolley in a parade celebrating the groundbreaking of the Panama–California Exposition Center in 1911.

San Diego's public transportation traces its roots back to the San Diego Street Car Company, which opened a single line on July 3, 1886, with cars drawn by two mules or horses. The system would eventually expand to five lines across downtown San Diego. At the same time as the first horse-drawn line was being inaugurated, there were already plans to start up an electric streetcar service in San Diego, with at least some service starting in November 1887.

The San Diego Electric Railway (SDERy), the direct predecessor of today's MTS, was founded in 1891 by John D. Spreckels (who would later go on to build the San Diego and Arizona Railway). The SDERy would greatly expand electric streetcar service by purchasing several existing transit companies and converted them to electric operation.

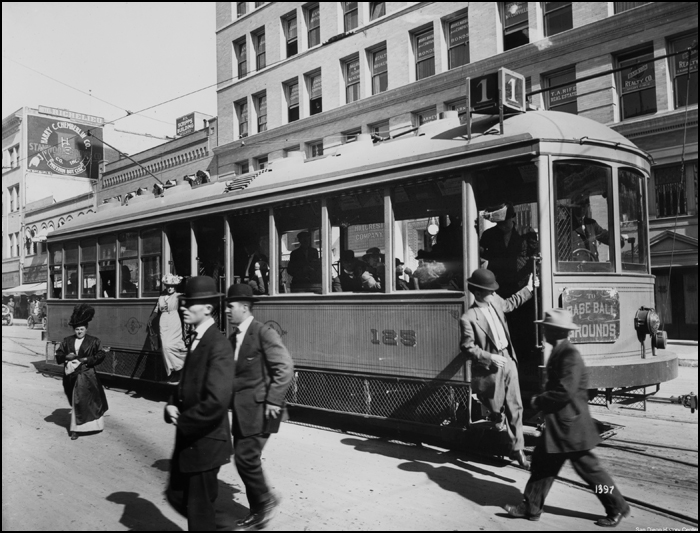
A San Diego Class 1 streetcar at 5th and Broadway, C. 1915.

In 1910, Spreckels was able to force a ballot initiative that amended his charter with the City of San Diego to give him more than 25 years on his leases to operate streetcar service. Passage of the initiative allowed the SDERy to secure loans that led to service expansion.

The electric streetcar system took a big hit during the "Great Flood" of 1916 which washed out several lines. Rebuilding was a challenge as World War I increased the cost of railway construction materials by 50 to 150 percent. Simultaneously, private automobiles became more common, with many owners driving the streetcar routes and picking up fares as illegal taxi operations.

The first motor bus hit the San Diego area streets in 1922, operating between National City and Chula Vista. Over the next two decades, the rail lines would gradually be replaced by motor buses, and on April 24, 1949, the last rail service was discontinued, making San Diego the first major city in California to convert to an all-bus system.

In 1948, the Spreckels family sold the San Diego Electric Railway Company to Jesse L. Haugh, who renamed it the San Diego Transit System and invested in updating and improving the system. Despite the improvements, ridership dropped. Facing a financial crisis, the city of San Diego took control of the system in 1967, renaming it the San Diego Transit Corporation, which was to be operated as a non-profit. In 1970, to boost struggling ridership, fares that ranged from 35¢ to $1.15 were lowered to a flat 25¢ fare. By the end of the decade, annual ridership would improve from 18 million to 35 million.

=== Planning for mass transit ===
The Comprehensive Planning Organization (now known as SANDAG), an intergovernmental agency of 13 cities and San Diego County, was established in 1966. The group began planning a mass transit system for the area, studying technologies, alignments, and costs, but the plans went nowhere due to disagreements between stakeholders. San Diego councilman Leon Williams and former state senator Jim Mills helped formulate what would become the San Diego Metropolitan Transit Development Board.

In 1975, California established the San Diego Metropolitan Transit Development Board (MTDB) with a clear mission: plan, construct, and operate a mass transit system. The agency formally started operations on January 1, 1976. The MTDB also struggled to resolve stakeholders' disagreements over the same issues of technologies, alignments, and costs.

On September 10, 1976, nature intervened, setting off a chain of events that would help decide the first mass transit line.

Hurricane Kathleen destroyed major sections of track and bridges on the San Diego and Arizona Eastern Railway's Desert Line east of San Diego. The Southern Pacific, which had previously purchased the line from the Spreckels family and renamed it the San Diego and Arizona Eastern Railway (SD&AE), wanted to abandon the railway, a request that was denied by the Interstate Commerce Commission in 1978. The MTDB stepped in and offered to buy the SD&AE for $18.1 million if the Southern Pacific fully repaired the line. The deal closed on August 20, 1979.

The purchase gave MTDB two sections of right-of-way that could be used for mass transit: the SD&AE Main Line from downtown San Diego to the San Ysidro Port of Entry and the SD&AE La Mesa Branch from downtown San Diego to El Cajon. The MTDB decided to build a relatively low-cost light rail system over the tracks, a new idea for the United States, but one that was well established in Germany.

The MTDB also continued to operate the freight operations of the SD&AE. The board reached a deal with the San Diego and Imperial Valley Railroad to continue to move railcars from the end of the Santa Fe Railway in downtown San Diego to either industrial customers in the San Diego area or to the Mexico–United States border in San Ysidro.

=== The return of rail ===
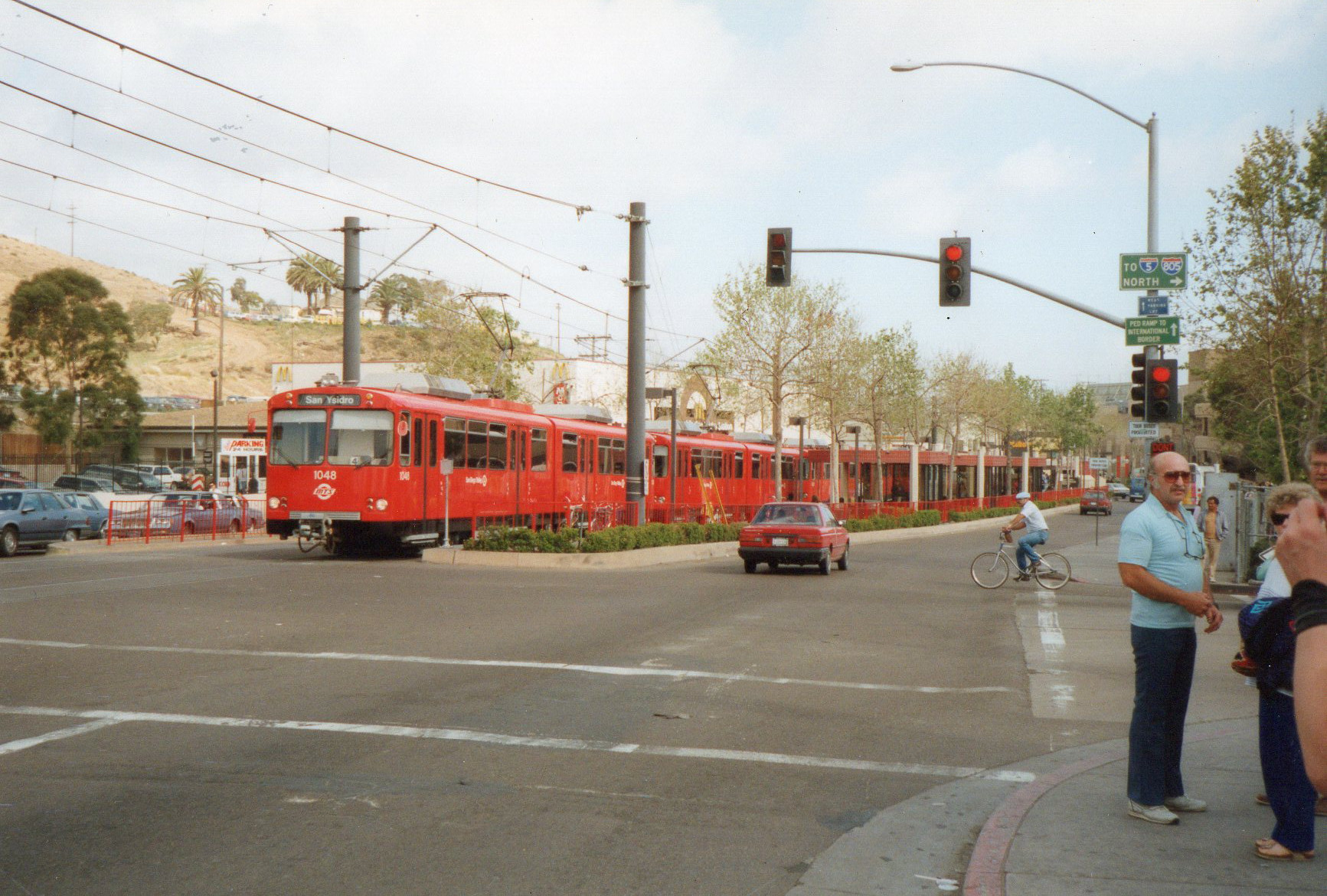
San Diego Trolley near the international border in San Ysidro, C. 1990

In August 1980, the MTDB established San Diego Trolley, Inc. to operate and maintain the new light rail system. On July 26, 1981, electric trains began operating the South Line (today's Blue Line) between downtown San Diego and San Ysidro.

In 1985, the city of San Diego transferred control of the San Diego Transit Corporation to the MTDB. The MTDB also coordinated transit services operated by San Diego County and other local agencies. Starting in 1986, all of these services begin operating under a single brand, the San Diego Metropolitan Transit System (MTS).

The San Diego Trolley added a second line on March 23, 1986, by redeveloping the La Mesa Branch of the SD&AE into the East Line (today's Orange Line). This line was extended to El Cajon by June 23, 1989. Service was expanded beyond the old SD&AE right-of-way when the line was extended further, going north, to Santee on August 26, 1995.

The East Line's Bayside extension to the San Diego Convention Center and the Gaslamp Quarter opened on June 30, 1990. Later in the decade, the South Line was extended to the north, reaching Little Italy on July 2, 1992, Old Town on June 16, 1996, and Mission San Diego on November 23, 1997. At that the same time, the South Line and East Line of the system were renamed the Blue Line and the Orange Line, respectively.

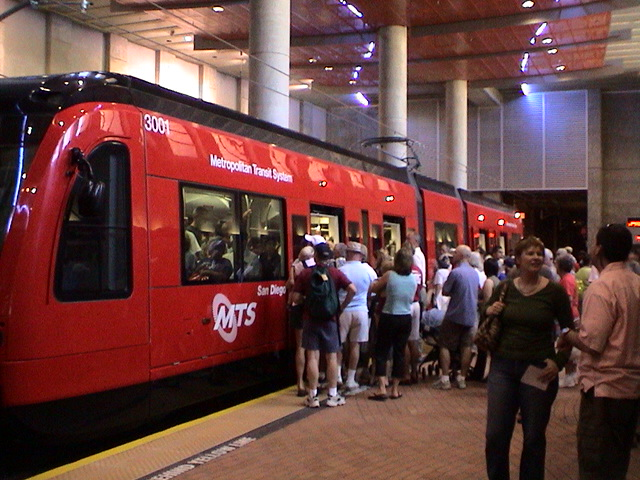
San Diego Trolley at SDSU Transit Center, the only underground stop in the system on opening day, July 10, 2005.

One of the system's most ambitious expansions opened on July 10, 2005. The Mission Valley East extension built the only underground station in the system at San Diego State University and inaugurated the third route in the San Diego Trolley system, the Green Line, going from the Blue Line at Old Town east through Mission Valley, San Diego State University, and merging with the Orange Line in La Mesa (and proceeding to El Cajon and Santee).

On January 1, 2003, the state consolidated the planning, development, and construction functions of the MTDB and the North San Diego County Transit Development Board into the San Diego Association of Governments (SANDAG) to create a consolidated regional transportation planning and development agency.

With the San Diego Metropolitan Transit Development Board no longer in charge of developing future transit projects, the MTDB changed its name to the Metropolitan Transit System (MTS) in 2005.

=== Modern history ===
In 2007, MTS completed a "Comprehensive Operational Analysis" that redesigned the area's bus network for the first time in 23 years. National City was reluctant to implement the findings of the analysis and instead opts to transfer control of its National City Transit system into MTS.

The major overhaul of the San Diego Trolley called the "Trolley Renewal Project" began in 2010. Over the next five years, all Trolley stations were renovated, making them capable of handling low-floor light rail vehicles that eliminate the stairs into the trains and allow faster boarding for people using wheelchairs. The renovations allowed the Green Line to be extended to downtown in 2012. Low-floor vehicles started operating on the Orange Line in 2013 and on the Blue Line in 2015.

In 2011, MTS opened the Silver Line, which operates renovated PCC streetcars around downtown San Diego in partnership with the San Diego Historic Streetcar Society.

MTS introduced its network of bus rapid transit routes in June 2014. The lines operate on exclusive roadways, dedicated lanes, high-occupancy vehicle lanes, and in mixed-traffic with other vehicles.

In 2016, the San Diego Trolley began construction of the Mid-Coast Corridor Transit Project. It is an 11-mile (18 km) extension of the Blue Line from the Old Town Transit Center north to the University of California, San Diego, La Jolla Village, and University City. Ridership is projected at 34,700 trips in 2030. The extension was completed and opened for service on November 21, 2021, costing $2.1 billion.

In 2019, MTS began a zero-emissions pilot program testing electric buses. By 2025 it operated 25 electric busses and had committed to purchase only zero-emissions vehicles by 2029, with a plan to fully transition in 2040.

On September 29, 2024, MTS opened the Copper Line, a shuttle between El Cajon Transit Center and Santee station, and cut the Green and Orange lines back to El Cajon. The change was meant to stop delays on the single-track segment north of El Cajon from spreading through the system. Adding a third track at the transit center cost about $14 million.

=== Fares and finances ===
MTS and the North County Transit District replaced the Compass Card with the Pronto fare system on September 1, 2021. It caps what a rider pays in a day or a month. Riders 18 and younger ride free through the Youth Opportunity Pass, which runs until June 30, 2027.

Ridership reached 81 million trips in the fiscal year ending June 30, 2025, a post-pandemic high and 7 percent more than a year earlier. MTS projected a shortfall of about $120 million in coming years. CEO Sharon Cooney said subsidies and fares had not kept up with inflation, and that without new revenue, cuts of about 25 percent of the operating budget would be needed.

In July 2026 SANDAG approved what was described as the region's first significant fare increase since 2009. On October 1, 2026, a standard one-way fare rose from $2.50 to $3.00 and the monthly pass from $72 to $85. A second increase on October 1, 2027, will raise them to $3.25 and $95. Riders enrolled in CalFresh, Medi-Cal or CalWORKs can keep the $2.50 fare through the Pronto LIFE program.

== Services ==
=== San Diego Trolley ===
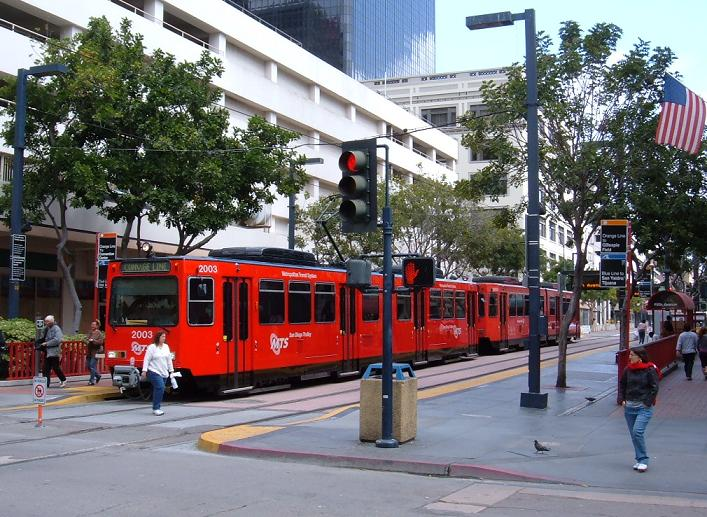
San Diego Trolley in Downtown San Diego.

The MTS Rail Operations division oversees the San Diego Trolley (colloquially known as "The Trolley") a system of light rail routes: the Blue Line, Orange Line, Green Line, and the Copper Line, as well as the Silver Line, which operates using heritage streetcars on select days. The system is operated by San Diego Trolley, Inc. (SDTI), a subsidiary of MTS. The trolley began service on July 26, 1981, making it the oldest of the second-generation light rail systems in the United States. The entire trolley network is 53.5 miles (86.1 km) with 53 stations. In 2023, the trolley had the highest ridership of any light rail system in the United States, with 38,047,300 annual rides, or about 121,600 per weekday as of the second quarter of 2024.

- The Blue Line, which opened in 1981, operates between the UTC Transit Center, UC San Diego, Old Town Transit Center, downtown San Diego, and the international border at San Ysidro.
- The Orange Line, which opened in 1986, operates between downtown San Diego and eastern suburban areas such as El Cajon and La Mesa.
- The Green Line, which opened in 2005, operates between downtown San Diego, Old Town, Mission Valley, San Diego State University, La Mesa, and El Cajon.
- The Copper Line, which opened in 2024, operates as a shuttle between El Cajon Transit Center and Santee station.
- The Silver Line, which opened in 2011, operates around downtown San Diego on select days using heritage streetcars.

=== MTS Bus Operations ===
The MTS Bus Operations division oversees 85 "MTS Bus" fixed-route services, nine "Rapid" bus rapid transit routes, and the "MTS Access" paratransit service. Routes are operated by private contractors and by the San Diego Transit Corporation (SDTC), a subsidiary of MTS. The SDTC operates 27 routes based out of downtown San Diego (Imperial Avenue Division) and Kearny Mesa (Kearny Mesa Division), Transdev operates 73 routes based out of Chula Vista (South Bay Division), El Cajon (East County Division), and operates the "MTS Access" paratransit service that are operated with mini-buses based out of Kearny Mesa (Copley Park Division). All buses and division facilities, even those used by contractors, are owned by MTS. In 2025, the system had a ridership of 37,930,300, or about 130,500 per weekday, as of the second quarter of 2026.

==== "MTS Bus" fixed-route services ====
Urban bus routes link the densely populated neighborhoods and adjacent cities together with direct and frequent bus services. These services constitute the bulk of fixed-route bus services operated in terms of vehicle requirements and patronage. Typically, headways are 12–15 minutes between scheduled bus arrival/departure times during commute periods and during midday times on the busiest lines. Generally, no worse than 30-minute headways occur during non-commute periods or 60-minute headways weekends. Local routes generally have stops placed at every block or every other block. Limited-stop lines have stops placed every approximately quarter to half-mile.

Three express fixed-route bus lines (Routes 20, 60, and 910) are operated along major roadways and highways and link intermediate distant suburban areas to the San Diego urban area. One of the five express lines (Routes 60) only operates during the morning and evening weekday commute periods. The 910 is the only express that runs during the night, going to and from San Ysidro and Downtown between midnight and 5:00 AM.

Rural transit services (Routes 888, 891, 892 and 894) link the sparsely populated central and eastern portions of San Diego County to the San Diego Trolley and other fixed-route transit services at the El Cajon Transit Center. These lines offer much less frequent service – Route 888 only operates on Mondays and Fridays, Route 891 on Fridays, and Route 892 on Thursdays. Only Route 894 operates Mondays through Fridays.

MTS currently operates 25 electric buses, and will only purchase zero-emissions vehicles beginning in 2029. By July 2024 the vehicles had driven a cumulative million miles. In 2025 the fleet consisted of 25 electric buses.

==== "Rapid" bus rapid transit service ====
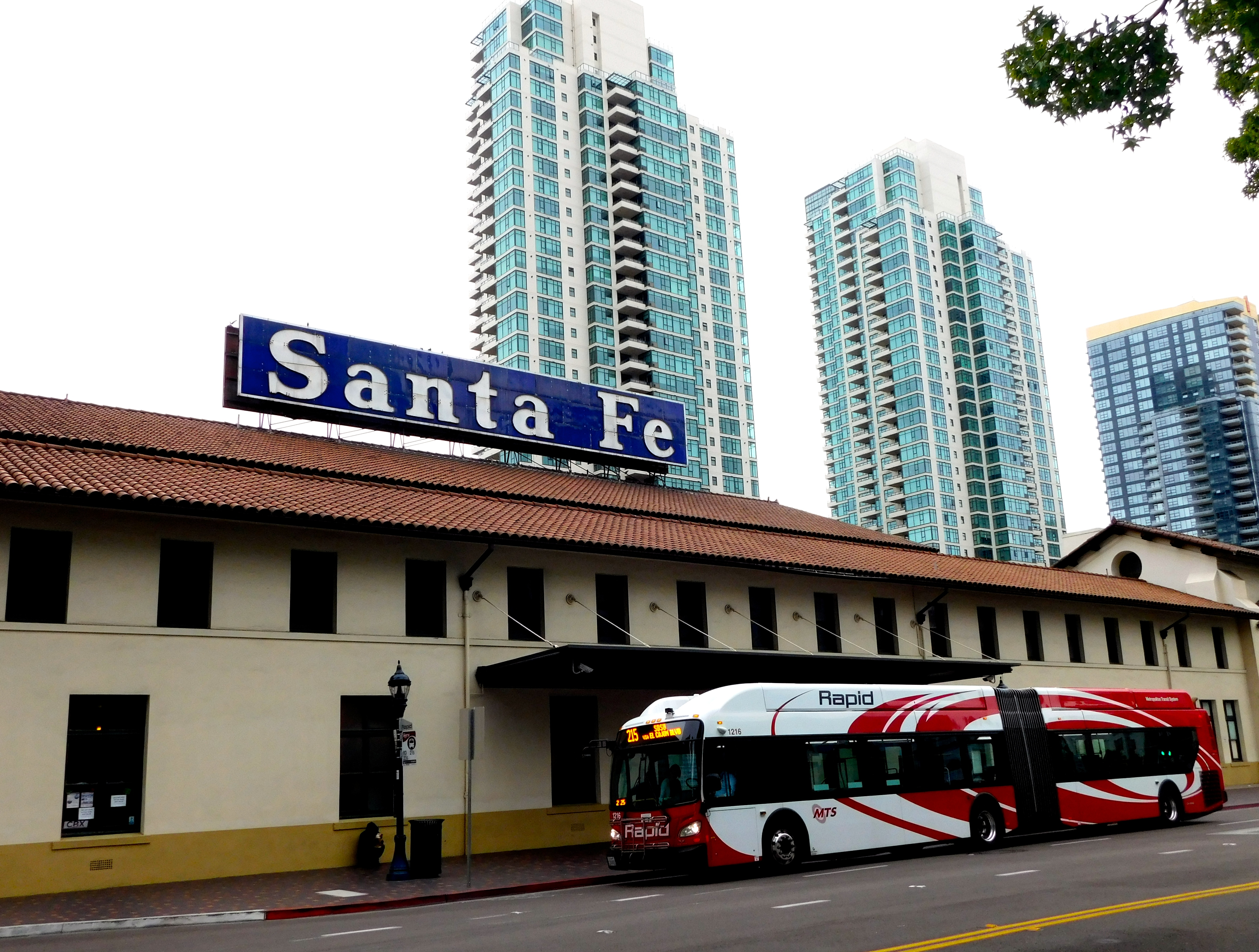
Rapid bus at Santa Fe Depot in downtown San Diego.

Rapid is a network of ten bus rapid transit (BRT) routes in the San Diego area. The lines operate on exclusive roadways, dedicated lanes, high-occupancy vehicle lanes, and in mixed-traffic with other vehicles.

- Routes 201, 202, and 204 offer frequent service in the University City and La Jolla Village areas near the University of California, San Diego. Initial service began in June 2009, with an extension in March 2013.
- Route 215 offers frequent service between San Diego State University and downtown San Diego, using dedicated lanes on Park and El Cajon Boulevards to speed up travel times. It opened for service in October 2014.
- Route 225 offers frequent service between the Otay Mesa Port of Entry, Chula Vista, and downtown San Diego, using the high-occupancy vehicle lanes of Interstate 805 and an exclusive roadway along East Palomar Street and in the Otay Ranch neighborhood to speed travel times. Initial service began in September 2018, with an extension in January 2019.
- Route 227 offers frequent service between the Otay Mesa Port of Entry and Imperial Beach. It opened for service in October 2023. This was the first rapid route to use electric buses.
- Route 235 offers frequent service between Escondido and downtown San Diego, using the high-occupancy vehicle lanes of Interstate 15, with dedicated ramps to transit centers, to speed travel times. It opened for service in June 2014.
- Route 237 offers limited service between the University of California, San Diego's "Gilman Transit Center" (with connections to the 201 and 202 above) and Miramar College. Route 237 operates during peak hours only and travels in mixed-traffic with other vehicles. It opened for service in October 2014.
- Route 280 offers limited, express service between Escondido and downtown San Diego, using the high-occupancy vehicle lanes of Interstate 15, with a dedicated ramp to the Del Lago Transit Station, to speed up travel times. The route operates during peak hours only. It opened for service in June 2014.
- Route 290 offers limited, express service between Rancho Bernardo and downtown San Diego, using the high-occupancy vehicle lanes of Interstate 15, with dedicated ramps to transit centers, to speed travel times. The route operates during peak hours only. It opened for service in June 2014.

==== "MTS Access" paratransit service ====
Paratransit services, operated under the name "MTS Access," provide point-to-point service upon request to passengers registered with MTS as being qualified for assistance under the Americans with Disabilities Act. Service is available throughout the MTS service area, and connections to a similar NCTD service are also available. Vehicles are typically mini-buses equipped with wheelchair lifts and tie-downs.

=== San Diego and Arizona Eastern Railway ===
The San Diego and Arizona Eastern Railway (SD&AE) is a subsidiary of MTS that manages and leases railroad tracks for freight service. The San Diego and Imperial Valley Railroad has exclusive trackage rights move railcars from the end of the BNSF Railway in downtown San Diego to either industrial customers in the San Diego area or to the Mexico–United States border in San Ysidro over the SD&AE Main Line and La Mesa Branch. The Baja California Railroad holds the right to operate over the SD&AE Desert Line in the Imperial Valley.

=== For-Hire Vehicle Administration ===
The For-Hire Vehicle Administration division licenses and regulates taxicabs, jitneys, non-emergency patient transport services, and other private for-hire passenger transportation services provided by contract in the cities of San Diego, El Cajon, Imperial Beach, La Mesa, Lemon Grove, Poway and Santee.

== Governance ==
MTS is a California public agency established and governed by the Mills-Deddeh Transit Development Act. The board of directors has 15 members, who are elected officials representing the cities and unincorporated within MTS's service area. These include the mayors of the cities of San Diego and Chula Vista, one member of the San Diego County Board of Supervisors, three members of the San Diego City Council, and one member each from the city councils of the cities of Chula Vista, Coronado, El Cajon, Imperial Beach, La Mesa, Lemon Grove, National City, Poway, Santee. The board members elect one of their own as their chairperson.

== See also ==
- Transportation in San Diego County
