= INIT =

INIT or Init may refer to:

== Science and technology ==
- init, the first process started during boot of a Unix system
- INIT (Mac OS), a system-extension mechanism in Apple Macintosh operating system prior to OS X
- INIT II, an intranasal insulin clinical trial

== Other uses ==
- Init Records, an American record label
- International IT College of Sweden (INIT College)
- INIT SE, a German technology company in the public transport industry
- "Init", a song by Nine Inch Nails on their soundtrack album for the film Tron: Ares

== See also ==
- Initialization (disambiguation)
