= San Diego Association of Governments =

Metropolitan planning organization for San Diego County, California

- SANDAG

Agency overview
- Formed: 1966; 60 years ago (as Comprehensive Planning Organization); 1980; 46 years ago (as SANDAG)
- Preceding agency: Comprehensive Planning Organization (CPO)
- Jurisdiction: San Diego County, California
- Headquarters: 1011 Union Street, Suite 400, San Diego, California, U.S.; 32.7157°N 117.1611°W
- Employees: ~400
- Annual budget: $1.3 billion (FY 2026)
- Agency executives: Lesa Heebner, Chair of the Board of Directors; Mario Orso, Chief Executive Officer
- Child agencies: MTS (shared authority); NCTD (shared authority)
- Website: www.sandag.org

The San Diego Association of Governments (SANDAG) is the council of governments and metropolitan planning organization (MPO) for the San Diego region of California. It is a joint-powers agency whose members are San Diego County and its 18 incorporated cities, and it is governed by a 21-seat Board of Directors of mayors, city councilmembers, and county supervisors drawn from those jurisdictions.

In addition to its role as the region's MPO, SANDAG serves as the regional transportation planning agency (RTPA), San Diego County Regional Transportation Commission, regional toll authority, and the agency responsible for the Regional Housing Needs Assessment for San Diego County. It administers TransNet, a countywide half-cent sales tax for transportation, and has shared capital-planning and fare-setting authority over the region's two public-transit agencies: the San Diego Metropolitan Transit System (MTS) and the North County Transit District (NCTD).

SANDAG and the Southern California Association of Governments are the two MPOs serving Southern California. The agency had an adopted budget of approximately $1.3 billion for fiscal year 2026 and employs roughly 400 staff serving a region of about 3.3 million residents.

== History ==
The origins of SANDAG trace to the mid-1960s, when post-war suburbanization of San Diego County produced region-wide planning pressures. In 1966, the county's incorporated cities and the County of San Diego formed the Comprehensive Planning Organization (CPO) as a long-range planning subcomponent of county government under a state-authorized joint-powers agreement. Six years later, in 1972, the member agencies reconstituted the CPO as an independent joint-powers agency. The organization adopted the name San Diego Association of Governments in 1980.

In 1987, San Diego County voters approved TransNet, a 20-year half-cent sales tax dedicated to transportation. Voters extended the tax in 2004 through 2048, and TransNet has since provided the local funding base for a significant share of the region's highway, transit, bikeway, and local-street investments.

In 2003, the California State Legislature consolidated the transit-planning and capital-project-development functions of MTS and NCTD within SANDAG, leaving day-to-day transit operations with the two transit agencies. SANDAG assumed ownership of the State Route 125 toll road in December 2011, purchasing the asset out of the operator's bankruptcy for roughly $341.5 million—about one-third of the cost to build it—and reducing tolls on the facility.

== Governance ==
=== Board of Directors ===
SANDAG is governed by a 21-seat Board of Directors composed of elected officials from each of the 18 incorporated cities in the county and the County of San Diego. The City of San Diego and the County each hold two seats; all other cities hold one. Together they represent 19 member agencies.

Representatives from eleven partner agencies also serve on the board as non-voting advisory members: Imperial County, Caltrans District 11, the U.S. Department of Defense (Navy Region Southwest), the Port of San Diego, the San Diego County Water Authority, the San Diego County Regional Airport Authority, MTS, NCTD, the Southern California Tribal Chairmen's Association, the Government of Mexico (through its Consulate General), and the Association of Planning Groups.

Most board actions are decided by a tally vote, in which each member agency casts one vote. After a tally vote, any two member agencies may call for a weighted vote. Under the weighted-vote process established in current form by Assembly Bill 805 in 2017, the 100 total weighted votes are allocated among jurisdictions in proportion to population (with the City of San Diego capped at 50 votes). Approval requires the affirmative vote of representatives from at least four member agencies representing at least 51 percent of the weighted total. When a weighted vote is called, its outcome supersedes the tally vote.

=== Leadership ===
In January 2025, the board unanimously elected Solana Beach Mayor Lesa Heebner to a two-year term as Chair, with San Diego City Council President Joe LaCava as First Vice Chair and Santee Mayor John Minto as Second Vice Chair. Heebner succeeded former county Supervisor Nora Vargas, who chaired the board from early 2023 until her abrupt resignation from the Board of Supervisors in late December 2024.

The day-to-day operations of the agency are led by a Chief Executive Officer, who reports to the Board. Gary Gallegos served as executive director from 2001 until his 2017 resignation amid a forecasting scandal. From December 2018 until his resignation effective December 29, 2023, the agency was led by Hasan Ikhrata, who made transit expansion and a proposed per-mile road-usage charge the centerpieces of the 2021 Regional Plan. Deputy CEO Coleen Clementson served as interim chief executive during the 2024 recruitment.

Following a national search, the Board selected Mario Orso, then the Chief Deputy Director of Caltrans District 11, as CEO on April 26, 2024. Orso, a 32-year Caltrans veteran, began a three-year contract on June 17, 2024, with a starting salary of $385,000 and a six-year option. Shortly after taking office, Orso dismissed Deputy CEO and chief economist Ray Major and eliminated the agency's deputy-CEO positions as part of a broader restructuring.

=== Policy Advisory Committees ===
The Board delegates responsibility to six Policy Advisory Committees that oversee specific subject areas: the Executive, Transportation, Regional Planning, Borders, Public Safety, and Audit committees. All items delegated to the committees are subject to ratification by the full Board.

=== AB 805 and governance reform ===
A 2017 investigation by Voice of San Diego revealed that SANDAG staff had overstated revenue projections and understated project costs for the 2004 TransNet extension and for the 2016 Measure A sales-tax increase that voters narrowly rejected. The disclosures prompted the resignation of longtime executive director Gary Gallegos and led to the introduction of Assembly Bill 805 by Assemblywoman Lorena Gonzalez Fletcher of San Diego.

Signed into law by Governor Jerry Brown on October 11, 2017, AB 805 restructured the weighted-vote process, required the agency to hire an independent performance auditor, and authorized MTS and NCTD to place their own sales tax measures on the ballot. The changes shifted the board's political center of gravity toward the region's larger and more urban cities.

== Responsibilities ==
SANDAG holds a number of federal, state, and local designations. In addition to its MPO and regional transportation planning agency roles, the agency serves as the San Diego County Regional Transportation Commission, the region's council of governments, and the San Diego County Regional Toll Authority. It also operates the Automated Regional Justice Information System (ARJIS), maintains the region's demographic and economic estimates and forecasts, and acts as the census information affiliate for San Diego County.

=== Regional Plan ===
San Diego Forward: The Regional Plan is a long-range blueprint integrating transportation, land use, housing, and environmental planning, and including a Sustainable Communities Strategy (SCS) as required by the Sustainable Communities and Climate Protection Act (Senate Bill 375). State and federal law require the plan to be updated every four years and to demonstrate how the region will meet California Air Resources Board (CARB) greenhouse gas reduction targets.

The 2021 Regional Plan, adopted in December 2021 at an estimated cost of $163 billion through 2050, envisioned an expansion of light rail and rapid bus services, a transit connection to San Diego International Airport, relocation of the LOSSAN rail corridor off the eroding Del Mar bluffs, and the eventual imposition of a four-cents-per-mile Regional Road Usage Charge beginning in 2030. The plan polarized the board, and in September 2023 the Board voted 15 to 4 to formally remove the mileage fee from the plan's framework.

On December 12, 2025, the Board adopted the 2025 Regional Plan and certified its accompanying environmental impact report. With an implementation cost of approximately $125 billion through 2050, the 2025 plan is considerably more fiscally constrained than its predecessor: it relies primarily on bus rapid transit, managed lanes, and on-demand flexible-fleet service; scales back the proposed Purple Line light rail to end in Mission Valley rather than Sorrento Valley; and assumes less federal funding than the 2021 Plan. The plan targets a 19 percent reduction in transportation-sector greenhouse-gas emissions by 2035, measured against 2005 levels.

=== Funding ===
About three-quarters of SANDAG's annual operating revenue comes from state and federal grants, with the remainder generated by TransNet, tolls, and other local sources. TransNet has been the agency's primary local funding source since 1987; a 2004 extension runs through 2048. State Route 125 toll revenue, FasTrak revenue from the I-15 Express Lanes, and Federal Transit Administration formula funds are among the agency's other significant revenue streams.

In November 2024, San Diego County voters narrowly rejected Measure G, a half-cent sales-tax increase intended to fund an ambitious transit, highway, and local-street program largely administered by SANDAG. The measure failed by roughly two percentage points, losing support across rural and suburban North County while winning 54 percent in the City of San Diego. The defeat constrained the funding assumptions available for the 2025 Regional Plan.

On May 8, 2026, the Board adopted a $1.5 billion program budget for fiscal year 2027, including $800.8 million for the annual portion of the capital program. SANDAG and Caltrans are also studying whether to end tolls on SR 125. SANDAG bought the road in 2011 and still owes more than $155 million, with payments of up to $13.8 million a year through 2043. The two agencies plan to spend $500,000 over three years on the study.

=== Fare payment systems ===
SANDAG launched the Compass Card in May 2009 as a regional contactless smart card integrating fare payment across MTS and NCTD services. It was replaced on September 1, 2021, by Pronto, an account-based system operated by INIT and jointly administered by MTS and SANDAG. Pronto introduced a Best Fare fare capping feature and expanded mobile-app payment.

In May 2022, SANDAG launched the Youth Opportunity Pass, a pilot program that provides free MTS and NCTD transit for anyone 18 or younger with a registered Pronto account. The pilot, which had distributed more than 32 million free rides by late 2024, has been extended through June 30, 2027.

In July 2026, the Board ratified a two-stage fare increase for MTS and NCTD on a 13–5 vote. Chula Vista, San Diego County, Del Mar, Lemon Grove and National City voted against it. The increase was described as the region's first significant one since 2009. On October 1, 2026, a standard one-way fare rose from $2.50 to $3.00 and the regional monthly pass from $72 to $85; a second step on October 1, 2027, will raise them to $3.25 and $95. Supporters argued that rejecting the increase would force service cuts later, and NCTD noted that fares make up about 7 percent of its operating budget. Riders enrolled in CalFresh, Medi-Cal or CalWORKs can keep the old fare through the Pronto LIFE program.

== Controversies ==
=== 2016 Measure A and forecasting scandal ===
In 2016, San Diego County voters rejected Measure A, a half-cent sales-tax increase that would have funded a range of SANDAG-administered transportation projects. Following the election, Voice of San Diego reported that SANDAG staff had known of systematic overestimates in its long-range revenue model but had neither corrected the figures presented to voters nor informed board members. Outside investigators subsequently confirmed that agency staff had been instructed to delete and conceal related documents. The disclosures prompted Gallegos's 2017 resignation and the passage of AB 805.

=== Road Usage Charge debate ===
Executive Director Ikhrata's proposal to impose a four-cents-per-mile road-usage charge beginning in 2030 became one of the most politically divisive regional-transportation issues in California in the early 2020s. Although the charge was initially included in the 2021 Regional Plan, the board directed staff to remove it in December 2021 and again in 2022, and staff presented a formal amendment to the 2021 Plan in 2023. The California Air Resources Board's 2022 certification of the plan was complicated by Ikhrata's position that the charge nonetheless remained in effect as a revenue assumption. The board voted 15 to 4 in September 2023 to formally strike the charge from the 2025 Regional Plan framework.

=== SR 125 toll-road overcharges ===
In November 2023, former SANDAG director of accounting and finance Lauren Warrem filed a whistleblower lawsuit alleging that SANDAG had wrongfully terminated her for raising concerns about systemic billing errors in the SR 125 toll-road accounting system operated by the vendor ETAN Tolling Technology. Warrem estimated that as many as 45,000 driver accounts had been mischarged.

A March 2024 report by SANDAG's Office of the Independent Performance Auditor concluded that ETAN's Fastlane back-office financial reporting was unreliable and that the agency's finance department lacked adequate internal controls. The auditor estimated the agency had lost at least $3 million in toll revenue due to the system's failures. An October 2024 follow-up investigation concluded that Ikhrata, CFO Andre Douzdjian, and other senior managers had been aware of the problems for more than a year before informing the Board.

The board subsequently replaced ETAN with Deloitte and A-to-Be and adopted the auditor's ten recommendations. Chula Vista and several South Bay elected officials called for the elimination of tolls on SR 125, though no vote to do so had been scheduled as of early 2026.

=== ARJIS data-sharing with federal immigration agencies ===
In January 2026, news reports revealed that the U.S. Customs and Border Protection (CBP) and Homeland Security Investigations (HSI) paid SANDAG approximately $100,000 annually for access to the Automated Regional Justice Information System (ARJIS), the regional law-enforcement database that aggregates traffic citations, arrests, field interviews, and limited driver's-license information from local police agencies. Although CBP is contractually prohibited from using the data for civil immigration enforcement, advocates and several board members raised concerns that SANDAG lacked independent authority to audit federal usage and that no compliance audit had been completed since 2017.

At the Board's January 29, 2026 meeting, San Diego City Councilmember Vivian Moreno called on SANDAG to terminate the federal contracts; County Supervisor Paloma Aguirre questioned whether ARJIS member agencies could be confirmed in compliance with California's Values Act (SB 54). The Board directed staff to return with options for tightening oversight, and the issue remained unresolved as of April 2026.

== Membership ==
=== Primary members ===
As of April 2026, the 19 primary members of SANDAG are the County of San Diego and all 18 incorporated cities of the county:

- Carlsbad
- Chula Vista
- Coronado
- Del Mar
- El Cajon
- Encinitas
- Escondido
- Imperial Beach
- La Mesa
- Lemon Grove
- National City
- Oceanside
- Poway
- San Diego
- San Marcos
- Santee
- Solana Beach
- Vista
- County of San Diego

=== Advisory members ===
Eleven other agencies participate on the board as non-voting advisory members:

- Imperial County
- Caltrans District 11
- U.S. Department of Defense (Navy Region Southwest)
- San Diego Metropolitan Transit System
- North County Transit District
- Port of San Diego
- San Diego County Water Authority
- San Diego County Regional Airport Authority
- Southern California Tribal Chairmen's Association
- Government of Mexico (Consulate General)
- Association of Planning Groups

== See also ==
- Transportation in San Diego County
- Southern California Association of Governments
- Metropolitan planning organization
- Regional Housing Needs Assessment
- Pacific Surfliner
