= Transportation in San Diego County =

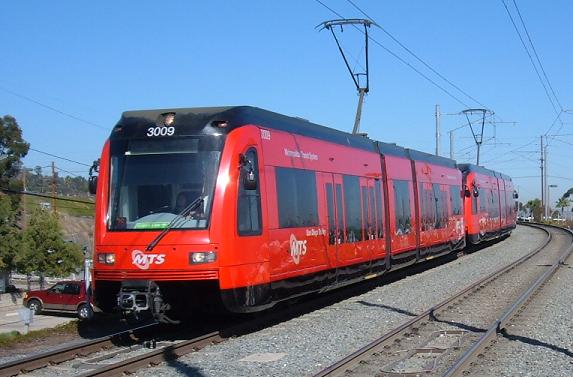
San Diego Trolley Green Line

The following is a list of transportation options in San Diego County, California.

== Rail services ==
=== Local ===
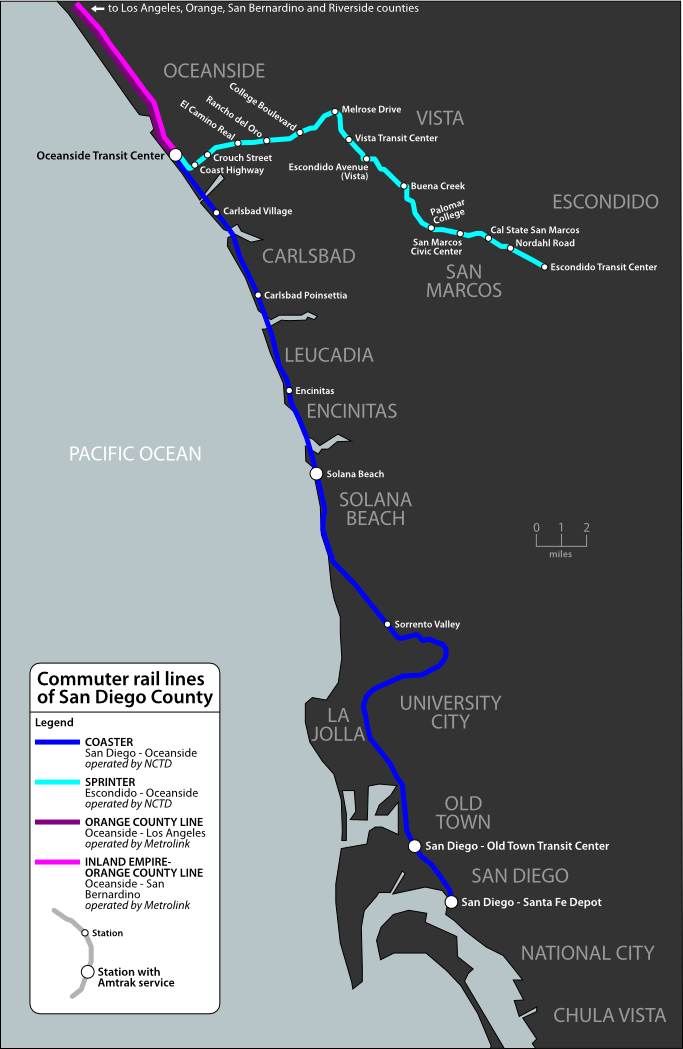
San Diego County commuter rail lines

==== San Diego Trolley ====
The San Diego Trolley is a light rail that serves the metropolitan area including central San Diego, East County, South County to the border.

==== COASTER commuter rail ====
The San Diego Coast Express Rail, or COASTER is a forty-one-mile commuter rail line that connects the North County to central San Diego. Eight stations in total are served, between Oceanside and downtown San Diego.

==== SPRINTER hybrid rail ====
The SPRINTER is a 22-mile light rail line between Oceanside and Escondido, California. Fifteen stations are served, including stops in the cities of Oceanside (western terminus), Vista, San Marcos, and Escondido (eastern terminus).

SPRINTER service is operated with Siemens Desiro diesel multiple units manufactured in Germany, where they are widely used.

=== Regional ===
==== Amtrak Pacific Surfliner ====
The Pacific Surfliner is a 350-mile (563 km) Amtrak passenger train route serving communities on the coast of Southern California between San Diego and San Luis Obispo with stops in Los Angeles.

==== Metrolink ====
Metrolink is a commuter rail network connecting major cities in Southern California including San Diego via transfers at Oceanside, Anaheim, Los Angeles, and Riverside. Metrolink does not serve the immediate San Diego area, just Oceanside in northern San Diego County.

== Bus services ==
Buses in San Diego County are operated by two agencies: MTS and NCTD. A third agency, CTS (County Transit System) formerly operated in the eastern and southern suburbs and Poway but was integrated into MTS in 2002.

=== Metropolitan Transit System ===
The San Diego Metropolitan Transit System (MTS) is the public transit service provider for Central, South, and East San Diego County. MTS operating subsidiaries include the San Diego Trolley, Incorporated (SDTI) and San Diego Transit, Corporation (SDTC). San Diego Transit directly operates approximately half of all fixed-route bus services within its service area. The remainder is provided under contractual agreements with Transdev or Southland Transportation Services. Some MTS bus routes connect to Breeze services in Escondido or Ramona in the NCTD service area.

MTS also provides the MTS Access service (provided under contractual agreement with First Transit) throughout its service area. This service is a point-to-point service provided upon request by passengers who qualify for special assistance under the ADA (Americans with Disabilities Act). This service is available in most of the cities of San Diego and Poway, as well as most of the southern and eastern suburbs of San Diego, and connections are available to a similar NCTD service.

The city of Chula Vista contracts with Transdev to provide fixed-route bus service.

=== North County Transit District ===
The North County Transit District's (NCTD) "BREEZE" operates 34 bus routes in the northern portion of the county from Del Mar, Escondido, and Ramona, to Orange County and Riverside County lines. Routes are in the 300 and 400 series (with the exception of route 101).

Bus Passes and transfers may be used both on MTS and NCTD services including the bus and the trolley, but the use of the COASTER may require an upgrade.

In addition, express buses from the Riverside Transit Agency connect Temecula with Oceanside and Escondido.

== Bus rapid transit ==
MTS and NCTD operate bus rapid transit lines in San Diego County. Breeze Rapid and SuperLoop are BRT-lite implementations in Escondido and University City respectively. There is a signal priority and dedicated stations but no dedicated lanes or similar infrastructure. MTS launched MTS Rapid service along the I-15 corridor June 8, 2014, launched San Diego State University and downtown San Diego and launched Otay Mesa and downtown San Diego in 2015.

== Road services ==
=== Public roads ===
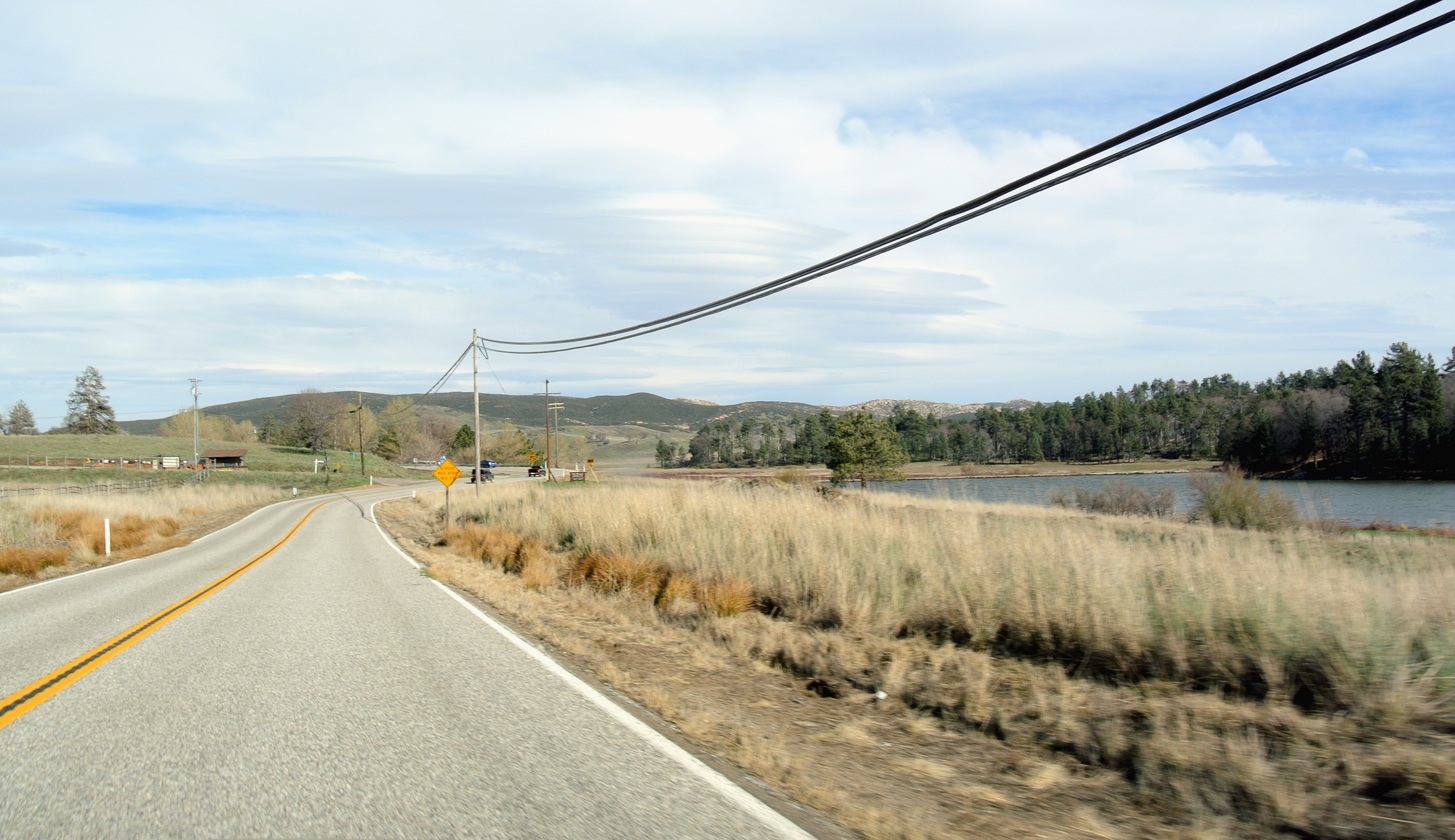
CA 79 looking north with lake Cuyamaca on the right

San Diego County has an extensive network of public roadways that allows vehicle drivers and bicyclists convenient direct access to all practical destinations in the county. Major freeways were built and repeatedly expanded to serve the needs of commuters coming into the city from the suburban regions of North County, South Bay, and East County, as well as the Tijuana metropolitan area.

San Diego is the terminus of three primaries interstate highways. Interstate 5 begins at the U.S.-Mexico border and heads north to Los Angeles. Interstate 8 begins at the Sunset Cliffs Boulevard in Ocean Beach, and heads east to the Imperial Valley and Arizona. Interstate 15 begins as State Route 15 at Interstate 5 in Southeast San Diego near Naval Base San Diego, becomes a formal interstate at Interstate 8 in Mission Valley, then heads northeast to the Inland Empire and then Las Vegas.

=== Bikeways ===
Public bikeways in San Diego County consisting of Class 1 bike paths, which are separate from the public roads, Class 2 bike lanes, which are demarcated space on the roadways designated to be used primary by bicyclists, and Class 3 bike routes, which are regular surface streets designated as being particularly attractive to bicyclists. SANDAG publishes a map that shows all of these bikeways in the greater San Diego Metropolitan area annually, and it is available at most local bike shops.

=== North County ===
North County has Class 1 bike paths in various stages of completion and planning.

The Inland Rail Trail bike path, which parallels the east-west Sprinter rail line, currently runs from Escondido Transit Center twelve miles west through San Marcos to Civic Center Drive in Vista, with a shorter segment at the Vista-Oceanside border near Melrose Drive station. The first phase opened in 2009, and the latest in 2026. A further phase to connect the two sections via Vista Transit Center is being designed as of late 2026. The trail is planned to be built alongside the rest of the Sprinter route through Oceanside all the way to Oceanside Transit Center in the coastal downtown.

== Air services ==
San Diego International Airport is the only airport in San Diego County to have commercial air service, though formerly McClellan–Palomar Airport in Carlsbad also had commercial air service.

San Diego International Airport is the busiest single-runway commercial airport in the world, with approximately 600 departures and arrivals carrying an average of over 55,000 passengers a day, and over 24 million passengers a year.

However, it occupies a much smaller footprint compared to other airports in the United States. As a result, recently, numerous plans have been proposed to either add another airport in the area or relocate it entirely.

Since December 9, 2015, the Cross Border Xpress terminal in Otay Mesa has given direct access to Tijuana International Airport, with passengers walking across the U.S.–Mexico border on a footbridge to catch their flight on the Mexican side. It is the only airport in the world with terminals located on the territory of two countries.

== Ferry services ==
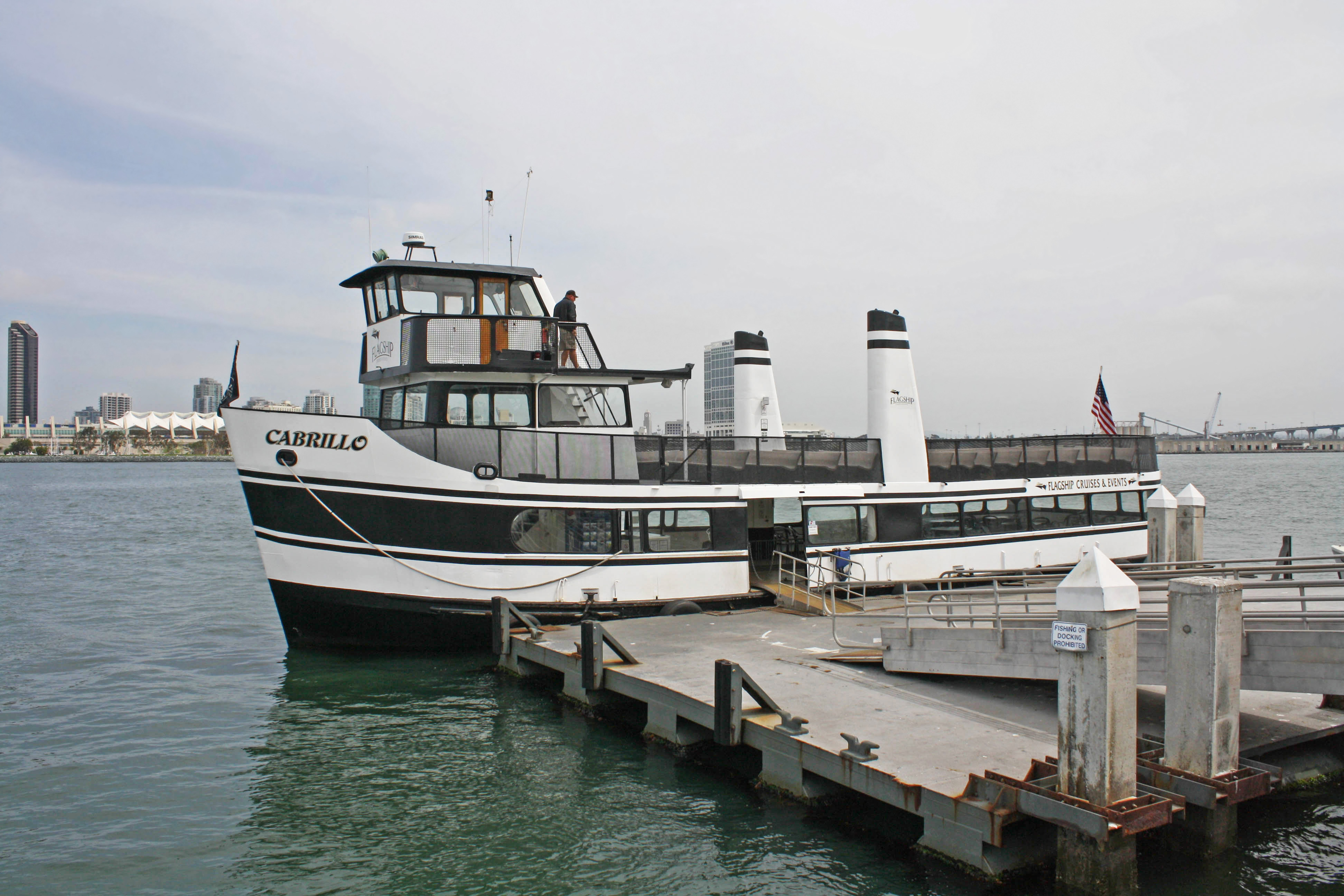
The Cabrillo ferry at the Coronado Ferry Landing

The Flagship Ferry operates ferry shuttles across San Diego Bay from Broadway Pier, the Coronado Ferry Landing, and the Convention Center Ferry Landing.

An international ferry service to Ensenada, Baja California operated by Azteca Ferries is expected to launch in 2025 or 2026.

== Pronto (Smart Card) ==
PRONTO is the universal electronic fare system used in San Diego County. It replaced the previous smart card system, Compass. Fares are paid either with the mobile app or the reloadable contactless smart card and accepted on different systems such as MTS buses, the San Diego Trolley, North County Buses, the Coaster, and the Sprinter.

== Taxis ==
There are a variety of taxi companies that are legally allowed to operate in the San Diego area. The general rate of each trip is $3/mile and there is an additional fee tacked on of $2 when being picked up from an airport. The RideYellow app launched in 2016 and provides a steep discount of 33% off of each ride taken through the app in order to compete with other ridesharing platforms.

== See also ==
- Transportation in San Diego
