= Clever Devices =

American technology company

Hitachi Rail CD Ltd.
- Formerly: Clever Devices Ltd. (1987–2026)
- Type: Subsidiary
- Industry: Technology; Transportation
- Founded: 1987; 39 years ago
- Founder: Bill Long
- Headquarters: Woodbury, New York, U.S.
- Key people: Frank Antonysamy (CEO)
- Number of employees: 2,000+
- Parent: Hitachi Rail (2026–)
- Website: hitachimms.com

Hitachi Rail CD Ltd., doing business as Hitachi Mobility Multimodal Solutions and formerly known as Clever Devices, is a Japanese-American multinational technology company, specializing in telematics and intelligent transportation systems for public transit. Headquartered in Woodbury, New York, the company has operations in the U.S., Canada, South America, and Europe. It is a subsidiary of Hitachi Rail.

== History ==
Clever Devices has its roots in the Heigh Ho Doorbell Company, (Note: Also spelled "Hi Ho" in Clever Devices media and other news reports.) a manufacturer of electronic doorbells. The company was founded in the early 1980s by Bill Long, co-owner and bartender of a bar in Port Washington, New York, and initially based in the bar's basement. After Heigh Ho folded, Long founded Clever Devices in 1987, and began to produce digital audio devices for a wide range of machines and commercial applications.

In 1996, Clever Devices was contracted to produce audio announcements for taxicabs in New York City, featuring the voices of celebrities. At the time, the company also provided announcements to amusement park rides and casinos.

Former logo as Clever Devices

Following the passage of the Americans with Disabilities Act of 1990, which required U.S. public transit providers to provide audible announcements on their vehicles, Clever Devices saw growth in providing passenger information systems for public transit. The company claims to have installed the first automated announcement system on a U.S. transit system in 1997, and was hired to add electronic announcement systems to Metropolitan Transit Authority buses in New York City in 1998. By 2000, Clever Devices reached $16 million in annual sales, of which 85% were to public transit agencies.

In 2002, the company was awarded a major contract to install passenger information systems on the Chicago Transit Authority's bus network, then its largest order to date.

In 2012, Clever Devices acquired competitor Digital Recorders; later, in 2015, the company acquired RSM Services Corporation. In 2017, the company acquired M.A.I.O.R., an Italian transportation software firm.

In April 2026, Hitachi Rail announced a definitive agreement to acquire Clever Devices; the transaction closed on July 1, 2026. In October 2026, Clever Devices rebranded as Hitachi Mobility Multimodal Solutions.

== Products ==
Clever Devices's products include:

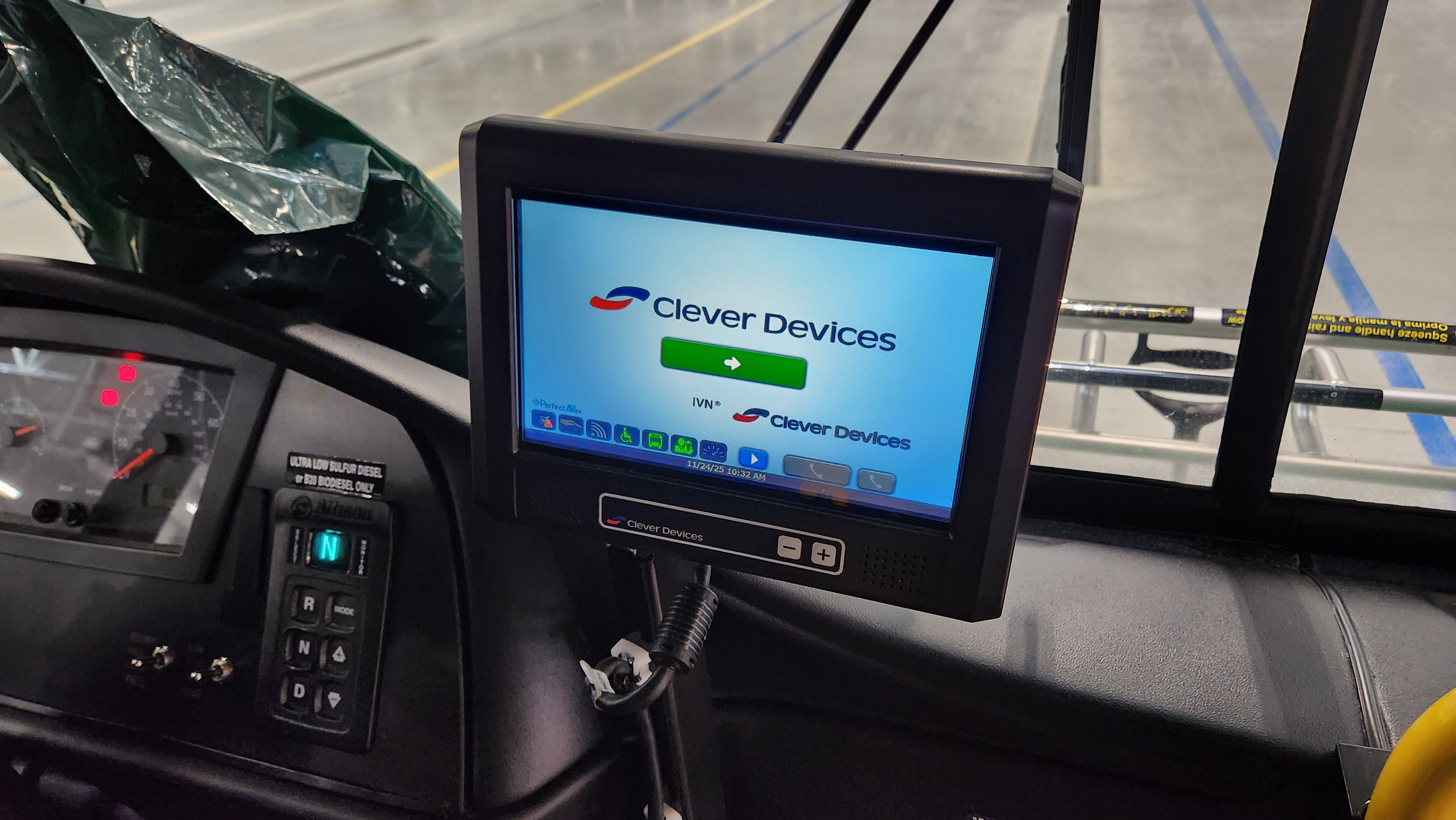
Clever Devices mobile data terminal on a bus

- Passenger information and automated announcement systems
- Computer-aided dispatch and automatic vehicle location (CAD/AVL) systems
- Automatic passenger counters
- Audible turn warning alarms

Notable clients include the Chicago Transit Authority, the Washington Metropolitan Area Transit Authority, Miami-Dade Transit, Pittsburgh Regional Transit, and Disney Transport.

== See also ==
- INIT SE
- Trapeze Software
