= Modaxo =

- Type: Division
- Founded: October 20, 2020
- Headquarters: Mississauga, Ontario, Canada
- Parent: Constellation Software (via Volaris Group)
- Divisions: Trapeze Software
- Website: modaxo.com

Modaxo is a division of Constellation Software, containing multiple independent divisions offering software products for the public transportation industry.

== History ==
Modaxo was formed in October 2020, as a new division of Volaris Group (itself a division of Constellation Software) housing the company's public transportation businesses.

== Divisions ==
- Busology - routing, scheduling, and fleet management for student transportation, separated from TripSpark in 2023
- Novvan - former fare collection division of Conduent, acquired October 2026
- RiderLoop
- Routeward - former fleet management and vehicle tracking division of Conduent, acquired October 2026
- Trapeze Software
- TransLoc - vehicle tracking software, acquired from Ford Motor Company in 2022
- TripSpark
  - Routematch - trip planning, fare collection, and vehicle tracking services, acquired from Uber in 2022
- Vontas - computer-aided dispatch and automatic vehicle location provider, separated from Trapeze in 2021
