= Compass card =

Compass card may refer to:

- Compass card (British Columbia), a contactless smart card payment system for public transit used in Metro Vancouver, Canada
- Compass Card (San Diego), a contactless smart card payment system for public transit that was formerly used in San Diego, California
