= Trapeze Software =

Canadian software company

Trapeze Software Inc.
- Type: Private
- Founded: 1990
- Headquarters: Mississauga, Ontario, Canada
- Number of employees: 1000+
- Parent: Constellation Software (via Modaxo)
- Subsidiaries: AssetWorks Inc.; CourtView Justice Solutions Inc.; Trapeze Austrics; Solutions By Computer Inc.
- Website: http://www.trapezegroup.com

Trapeze Software Inc. (doing business as Trapeze Group) is a Canadian multinational software company, specializing in intelligent transportation systems and scheduling software for public transport. Headquartered in Mississauga, Ontario, Trapeze is a subsidiary of Constellation Software.

== History ==
In 2004, Trapeze entered the intelligent transportation system market. This division was rebranded as Vontas in 2021.

=== Acquisitions ===
- 1996: merged with Online Data Products, paratransit software firm based in Scottsdale, Arizona
- 1997: acquired Ecotran Corp, entered school transit market
- 2000: acquired Traffic Partners, a Danish transport planning, operations, and management software provider
- 2001: acquired Cerney Computer Services (UK), a provider of demand response software for community transport
- 2002: acquired Multisystems Information Technology Group, a division of Multisystems, Inc., and ATIS division of ManTech
- 2004: acquired Public Transport Sector division of Anite
- 2005: acquired Education Planning Solutions, a provider of planning software for school districts
- 2005: acquired AUSTRICS software and intellectual property from TransAdelaide
- 2006: acquired assets of Inovas and its product lines including VRT, EcoRoute Trainer (ert), Aerial Asset Survey, Pipe Inspect and Fusion; and Action Information Management (AIM) an established leader in RTPI, ITS and PTI
- 2007: acquired Grampian Software Holdings Ltd in the UK adding Duty allocation, distillery records, and Distillery Records and Management products to the Trapeze portfolio
- 2007: acquired the Fleet Runner solution suite from Data Futures
- 2008: acquired Solutions by Computer which provides business management software to the equipment, tool, and event rental industry
- In 2008, Southern Computer Systems a privately held company providing fleet management software to Local Authorities, bus companies and coach operators throughout the UK
- 2008: acquired Cal Software, including Kinross Software
- 2008: acquired Assets and Liabilities from MAXIMUS
- 2009: acquired public transit division of Continental AG
- 2010: acquired AGRIS and ExtendAg product suites from Deere & Company, and BMS Computer Solutions Ltd, a provider of software to the agriculture industry
- 2011: created Cultura Technologies, bringing together the acquired Agri-Food software businesses
- 2014: acquired Fare Logistics

== Products and services ==
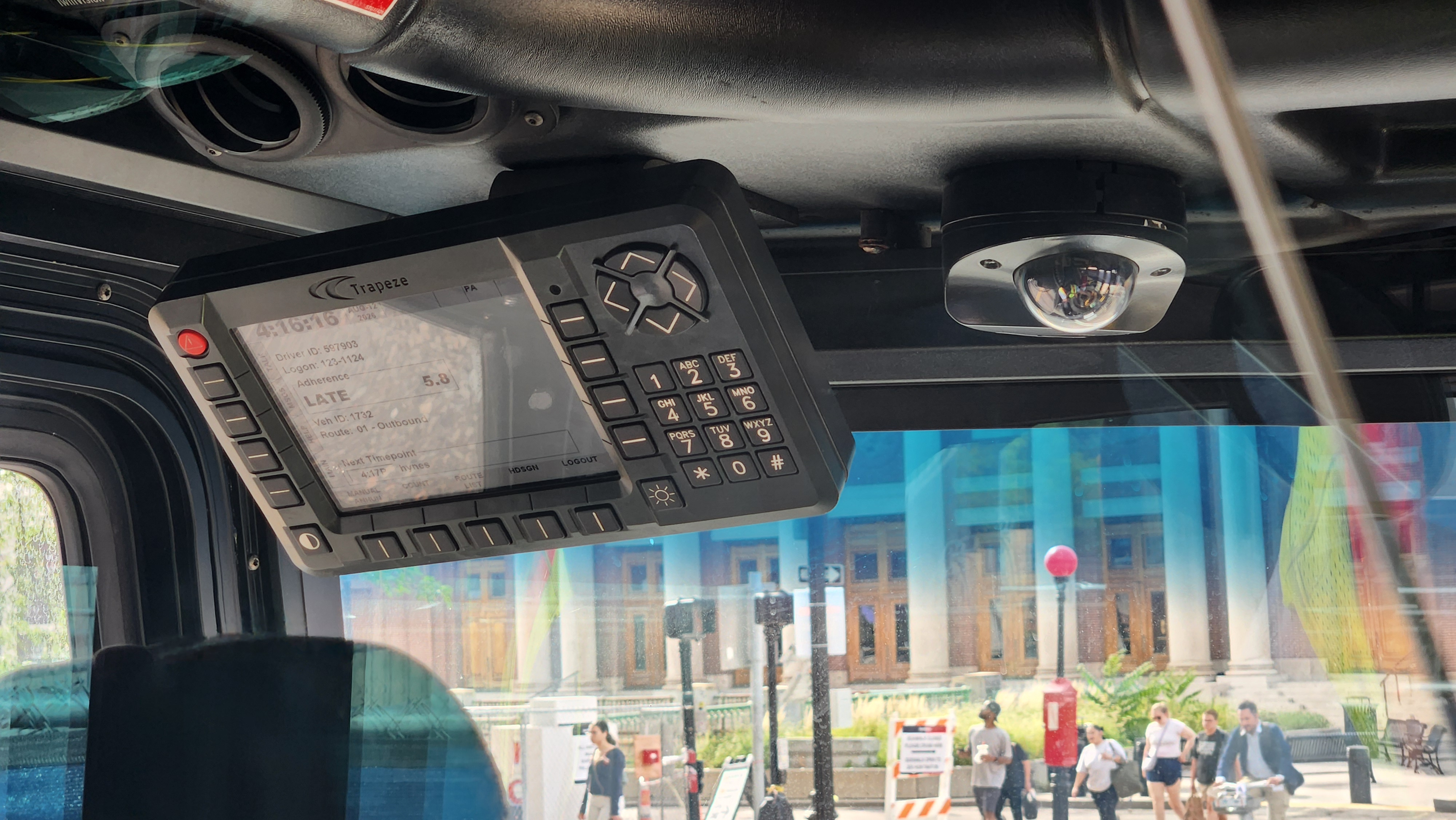
Trapeze mobile data terminal onboard an MBTA bus

Trapeze provides software and equipment to support many functions of transportation systems, including:

- Scheduling for fixed-route and demand-response public transit services, school transportation, and non-emergency medical transportation
- Workforce management
- Ridership and efficiency data collection and analysis
- Fare collection
- Computer-aided dispatch and automatic vehicle location
- Passenger information displays and announcements
- Safety planning and incident management
- Fleet maintenance and fuel management

=== Platform ===
Trapeze's point systems and enterprise started on the DOS platform and later moved over to the Windows platform. Trapeze has since created applications that can be accessed over the web.

=== Databases ===
Trapeze's applications leverage MS-SQL and Oracle database infrastructures to operate.

=== Paratransit (Demand Response Transport) Scheduling System ===
Trapeze PASS is a scheduling and dispatching application developed to support the transportation management efforts of demand response transit services while following guidelines from the Americans with Disabilities Act. PASS can be used for client registration, trip booking, real-time scheduling, and dispatching. PASS integrates GIS mapping, enabling users to precisely geocode client addresses and destinations, calculate trip lengths and distances for accurate scheduling, and zoom in to view detailed information about the service area. The PASS system can be extended to include other modules for demand response management, such as coordinated transportation, eligibility certification, customer communication management, real-time vehicle location and mobile data communication, and Web and IVR interfaces for automated customer access. PASS can also be fully integrated with Trapeze planning and scheduling software.

== See also ==
- Clever Devices
- INIT SE
- Demand responsive transport
- Passenger information system
- Intermodal Journey Planner
- Intelligent transportation system
