= Conduent =

American technology services company

Conduent Incorporated
- Type: Public company
- Traded as: Nasdaq: CNDT; Russell 2000 component
- Industry: Business services
- Founded: January 3, 2017; 9 years ago
- Headquarters: Florham Park, New Jersey, U.S.
- Number of locations: 22 countries (2021)
- Area served: Worldwide
- Key people: Harsha V. Agadi (CEO); Giles Goodburn (CFO)
- Services: Outsourcing
- Revenue: ▼US$4.140 billion (2021)
- Number of employees: 54,000 (2026)
- Website: conduent.com

Conduent Inc. is an American business services provider company headquartered in Florham Park, New Jersey. It was formed in 2017 as a divestiture from Xerox. The company offers digital platforms for businesses and governments. As of 2026, it has over 54,000 employees working across 24 countries.

== History ==
On June 5, 2016, Xerox announced that it would be spinning off its Xerox Business Services division into a wholly separate corporation, for which the name was yet to be determined. The business scope of the new company was generally understood to be essentially identical to that of former business services company Affiliated Computer Services (ACS), which Xerox had acquired six years earlier in 2010.

On October 6, 2016, having previously announced its intent to separate into two separate companies, Xerox announced the identity of the new business services company as Conduent. It described the company's "coined name" as "inspired by the company's expertise in managing transactional relationships between their clients and their constituents".

On January 3, 2017, Conduent formally came into existence following its separation from Xerox. At the end of the first quarter of 2017, Carl Icahn owned 9.7% of the company.

In February 2019, Conduent sold some of its customer care contracts to Skyview Capital, which created a new business called Continuum Global Solutions LLC.

In February 2020, Conduent announced the appointment of Clifford Skelton to become the chief executive officer. Prior to the appointment, Skelton has been serving as Conduent's interim CEO for seven months. He will continue as a member of Conduent's Board of directors. In January 2026, Harsha V. Agadi succeeded Clifford Skelton to be the next CEO of Conduent.

In May 2021, Conduent settled with the United States Department of Labor to resolve allegations of discrimination in hiring during 2013–2015 under the operation of the previous company, Xerox Commercial Solutions. Conduent agreed to pay $395,000 to 1,624 Black, Asian, Native Hawaiian, and Pacific Islander job applicants.

On May 15, 2023, the Victorian State Government announced it had signed a A$1.7 billion contract with Conduent that will see the company operating the state's Myki ticketing system for the next 15 years, effective from December 1, 2023. Conduent would also be tasked with overhauling the state's existing ticketing system to enable Victorians to be able to use their phones, credit cards and smart watches to pay for public transport travel.

In 2026, Conduent sold its public transport business to Modaxo.

=== 2024–2025 data breach ===
From October 2024 to January 2025, Conduent's systems were accessed by a malicious actor, who exfiltrated personal information on over 10 million people, including names, Social Security numbers and medical information. Conduent discovered and mitigated the attack in January 2025, and began notifying affected consumers starting in October of that year. In February 2026 reports indicated that the number of people affected was over 26 million.

== Services and products ==
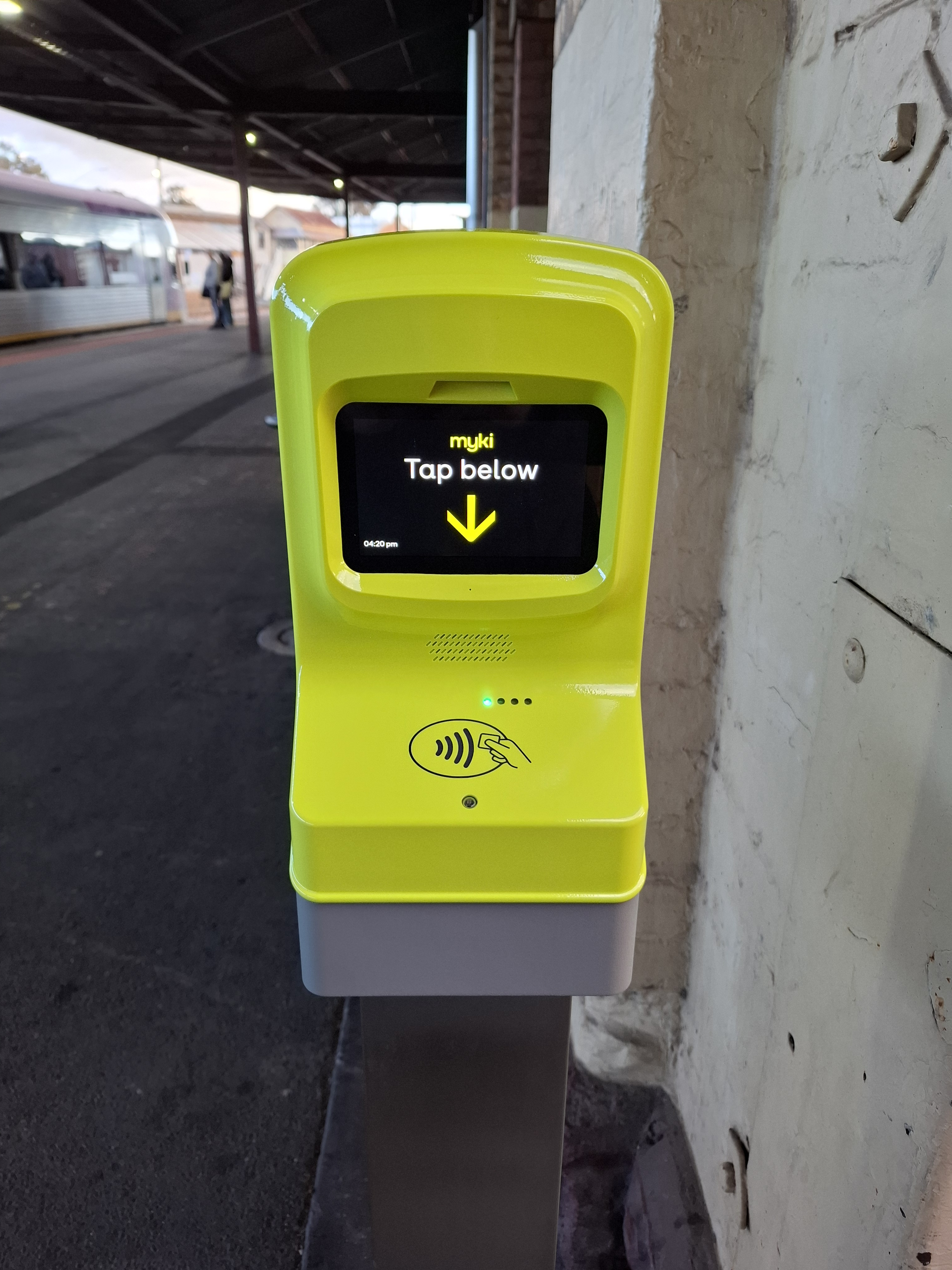
Conduent Myki reader installed at Bendigo railway station

Conduent provides business services such as:

- medical billing
- patient support services
- automatic fare collection systems
- electronic toll collection
- Medicaid screening
- prepaid card processing for government benefits such as welfare, Social Security, and food stamps

== Awards and recognition ==
- April 2021: Forbes ranked Conduent #486 in their annual list of America's Best Employers for Diversity.
- January 2022: named to 2022 "GovTech 100" List of Companies
