= Regional Housing Needs Assessment =

California government planning process

The Regional Housing Needs Assessment (RHNA) is the California state-mandated process within the housing element of its General Plan, to determine how much housing must be planned for each jurisdiction (city or unincorporated county) according to Housing Element Law to meet 'projected and existing' housing needs at a variety of affordability levels. Based on demographic data, the state calculates housing need in coordination with each region's planning body, known as a Council of Governments (COG). Once the state and the COG agree, the COG is responsible for the allocation among all jurisdictions within that region through a RNHA Plan. Housing elements are then reviewed by the California Department of Housing and Community Development (HCD) and must be adopted by the jurisdiction which is then responsible for ensuring there are enough sites and proper zoning to accommodate its RHNA allocation. The cycle repeats every eight years. Jurisdictions which fail to adequately accommodate projected growth as determined by HCD are subject to fines from $10,000 per month to $600,000 per month.

The RHNA process was created with the passage of AB 2853 (Chapter 1143, Statutes of. 1980) in 1980, which was authored by Assemblyman Mike Roos (D-Los Angeles) and made previously advisory housing guidelines mandatory.

== Cycles ==
=== List of cycles ===
- First Cycle: 1981
- Second Cycle: 1984-1986
- Third Cycle: 1999-2001
- Fourth Cycle: 2003-2011

=== Fifth Cycle: (January 1, 2013 - December 31, 2020) ===
A 2019 UCLA study noted that completed construction did not meet assessments over the Housing Element planning period covering 2003–2014, with permitted construction at only 47 percent of assessed needs, and was predominantly for single-family homes. The study found that under existing (2019) zoning ordinances, not enough locations exist to meet Governor Gavin Newsom's campaign promise of 3.5 million new homes by 2025, and most of the locations where construction is allowed lie in areas where there is no demand.

=== Sixth Cycle 2023-2031 ===
In 2022, the sixth cycle RHNA figure for the eight-year period 2023-2031 came in at 2.5 million, more than double what the fifth cycle goal had been of 1.2 million.
