= International IT College of Sweden =

Coordinates: 57°41′41.39″N 11°54′50.77″E

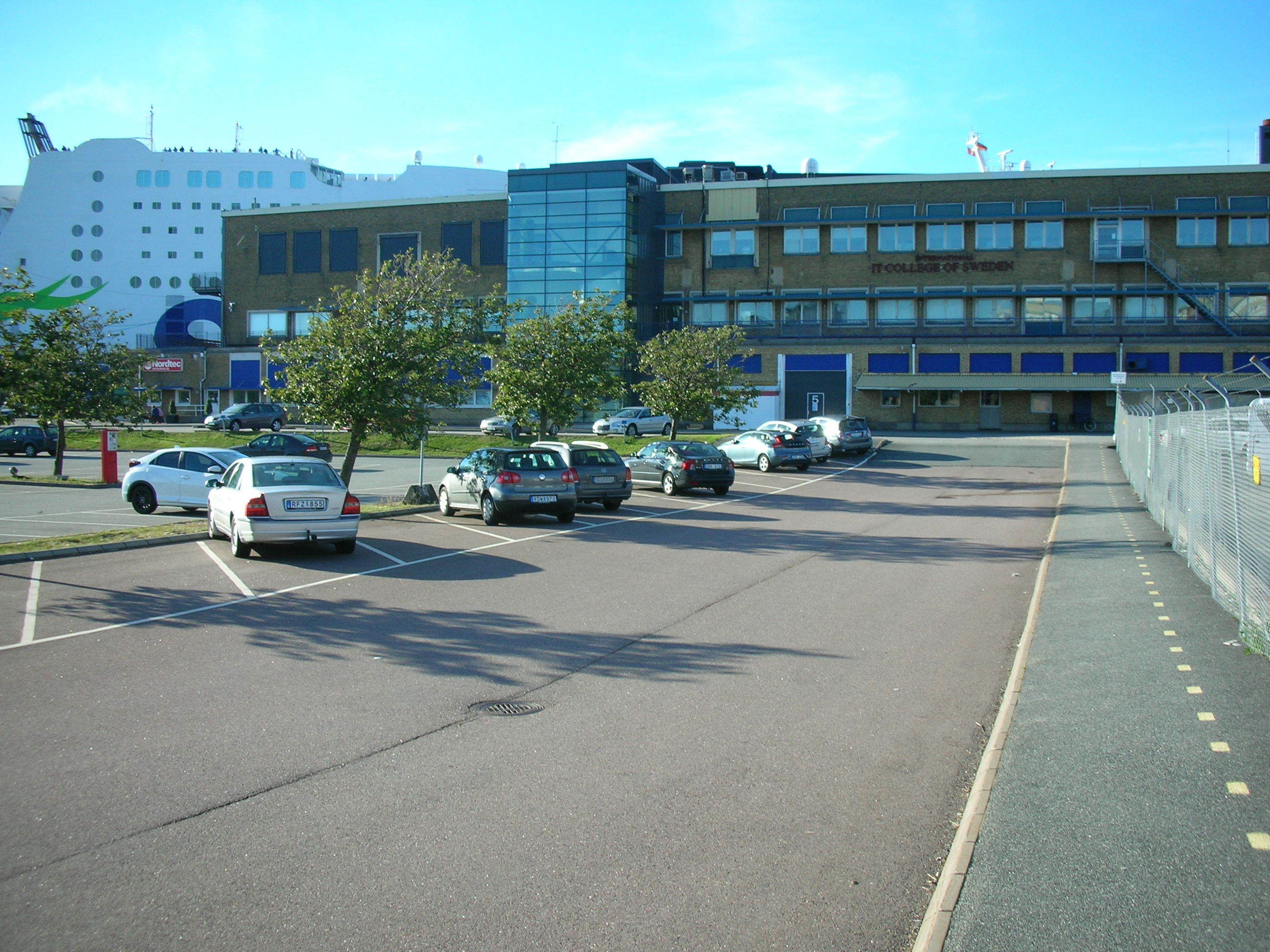
International IT College of Sweden, Gothenburg.

The International IT College of Sweden, or INIT College, is an independent secondary school located in Stockholm and Gothenburg The concentration in the school is IT and English, and offers five different programs or tracks that students can follow: social science, natural science, information technology, economic studies and media.

The school in Gothenburg is located on Elof Lindälvsgatan 13 in the same building as the Deutschlandterminal. It moved there in the summer of 2007 after having been located in Gårda since the school was founded in 2004. The school in Stockholm is located on Hälsobrunnsgatan 6, earlier named Crafoords väg 20. Both school have the same student associations, like Skoluidrottsföreningen SIF (Athletics), Student Council, and the LAN-groups ILA (Gothenburg) and LUNI (Stockholm).

== School associations ==
INIT’s athletics association is an active group which participates in and organized different tournaments. Among others they have organized a DM (district championship) in football. The International IT College of Sweden was also awarded first place in upper secondary schools for their effort. Through the education from the athletics association two students of International IT College have been chosen to join Gothenburg’s School athletics associations committee. The schools also have two LAN-groups ILA (Gothenburg) and LUNI (Stockholm). They are run by students and arrange LAN-parties. During the spring of 2008 the doors opened for the first LAN-party for people outside the school and during the weekend nearly 100 persons gathered at INIT school to compete in different games.

== The schools participation in different events ==
The January 22nd 2007 Leve Klotet took place and one of the special invited guests was Al Gore. At the event, as representatives from the Göteborg region upper secondary school were students from International IT College of Sweden. The students had also a chance to attend at different seminar which all was about sustainable development, something that the students have brought to their school to carry on working with it. One of the students at International IT College of Sweden, Gabriella Brönnegård, had the chance, through the school to take part in a national essay competition. The student won the competition and travelled to New York to speak in front of UN General Assembly about peace on earth.

== Critique against the school ==
The newspaper Dagens Nyheter has criticized the school regarding its act in a commission when one of its students in May 2008 was stabbed outside the school by another student from an adjacent school.

After the publishing of the critique, Dagens Nyheter also interviewed a former teacher, Karl Ågerup, who had written the book Barnens Marknad. Ågerup reported among other things, that the school management puts the school’s economic profit in front of the students’ best interests. He also reported that the principal has changed a failed grade.

The schools management group has rejected the critique.
