= Initialization =

Initialization may refer to:

- Booting, a process that starts computer operating systems
- Initialism, an abbreviation formed using the initial letters of words or word parts
- In computing, formatting a storage medium like a hard disk or memory. Also, making sure a device is available to the operating system.
- Initialization (programming)
- Weight initialization, the setting of initial values of trainable parameters in a neural network.
