= Pronto (smart card) =

Public transit smart card used in San Diego, California

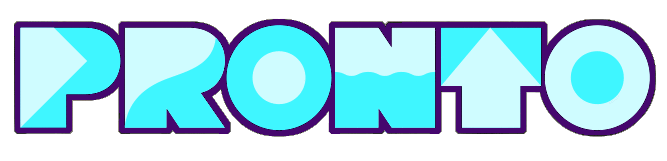
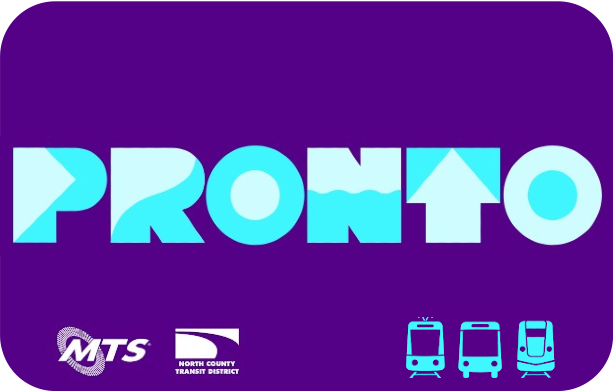
- Location: San Diego County, California
- Launched: September 1, 2021; 4 years ago
- Predecessor: Compass
- Technology: MIFARE DESfire; MOBILEVario
- Operator: INIT
- Manager: San Diego Metropolitan Transit System
- Currency: USD
- Auto recharge: Registered Users Only
- Validity: MTS Bus; MTS Trolley; MTS Rapid; NCTD Breeze; NCTD Coaster; NCTD Sprinter
- Retailed: The 12th and Imperial Transit Store, Downtown San Diego; NCTD Ticket offices; Ticket Vending Machines at MTS/NCTD Rail Stations; Select Albertsons/Retail Outlets
- Variants: Regular; Youth; Senior-Disabled-Medicare
- Website: ridepronto.com

Pronto (stylized as PRONTO) is the contactless payment system for automated fare collection on public transit services in San Diego County, California. The system is managed by the San Diego Metropolitan Transit System (MTS) and operated by INIT.

Pronto is valid on all services operated by MTS and the North County Transit District (NCTD). It launched on September 1, 2021, replacing the first-generation Compass Card system.

== Features ==
The Pronto system replaced the Compass Card as the primary method of fare payment on San Diego Metropolitan Transit System and North County Transit District services across San Diego County. Pronto introduced new features for passengers, including an expanded network of retail outlets, and an enhanced website for adding cash value and passes. Pronto also introduced Best Fare, a fare capping system that credits each single-ride fare towards the cost of a daily or monthly pass.

In addition to the credit card-sized Pronto card, passengers can also pay fares for transit services with the Pronto mobile app, and with their Visa, Mastercard, or Discover credit or debit card.

== Fare types ==
The Pronto card is valid on the San Diego Trolley, MTS buses, NCTD buses, Coaster, and Sprinter. Most services charge a flat fare, and are eligible for Best Fare, the fare capping system that credits the cost of individual rides towards a daily or monthly pass. Coaster uses zone-based fares, and is not eligible for Best Fare.

Reduced fares are available via a reduced-fare Pronto card for individuals with disabilities, seniors over the age of 65, and Medicare recipients. Reduced-fare Pronto cards with a photo of the user are available from transit agency offices, and standard Pronto cards can also be converted to reduced-fare status by applying online or in person.

Children ages 6 to 18 are also eligible for reduced fares. In a pilot program running from May 2022 to June 2026, youth riders are eligible for free fares with a youth Pronto card.

== History ==
=== Planning and Installation ===
In 2018, the San Diego Metropolitan Transit System launched Elevate San Diego, a public participation plan that will address the needs for the growing population, and eventually invoke Assembly Bill 805, and increase the half-cent sales tax within MTS jurisdiction via ballot proposition. It has been postponed indefinitely due to the pandemic.

In January 2019, MTS awarded INIT Systems the contract to install and operate the new system.

Installation began in February 2021 on MTS vehicles. The first machine was installed at the San Diego Convention Center on February 8, with further machines and validators being installed at NCTD and MTS transit stations in the following months.

=== Transition ===
On April 16, 2021, the SANDAG Transportation Committee voted to approve the system. On June 17, the MTS Board adopted a transition plan, and announced the system will launch on September 1, when proposed fare hikes take effect.

The transition began in August 2021, when cards became available for purchase. On August 15, registration began, and the app was released to smartphones. The system came online at midnight on September 1. Cards issued during the transition period were pre-loaded with a monthly pass, which activated upon launch of the system.

As the primary agency of the system, MTS assumed user support responsibilities, including the chat and call centers, which are called the Pronto Support Team.

== Technology ==
The Pronto system is an account-based system, which stores information about a card's balance and passes in a central database. This is in contrast to the previous Compass Card system, where information about balance and passes was stored on the card itself. Card readers on buses and at train stations are linked to the central database in real time, which means that passes and stored value purchased online are available immediately. The Pronto system is based on the MOBILEvario fare collection system, a commercial off-the-shelf product provided by Karlsruhe-based technology firm INIT.

Reduced-fare Pronto cards are available for eligible passengers. The reduced-fare status of the card is stored in the central database, and passengers who are eligible for reduced or free fares are able to convert their standard Pronto card to a reduced-fare card by completing an application online or in person at select locations.

Another benefit of the account-based architecture is that it enables new fare types that benefit riders. With the launch of the Pronto card, MTS and NCTD enabled fare capping on bus and light rail services, branded as "Best Fare." Pronto card users are able to purchase monthly passes in advance, and they are also able to earn a daily or monthly pass by paying single fares.

== Criticism ==
The Pronto mobile app has been criticized by advocacy organizations and the media since its launch in August 2021. Connor Proctor, founder of transit advocacy group RideSD, found that setting up a new account in the app took 191 clicks, far more than the 13 required to set up an Uber account. Voice of San Diego compared the difficulty of using the Pronto card to the slow rollout of its predecessor the Compass Card, and highlighted technical difficulties faced by riders when scanning the QR codes presented by the Pronto mobile app.

== Photo gallery ==
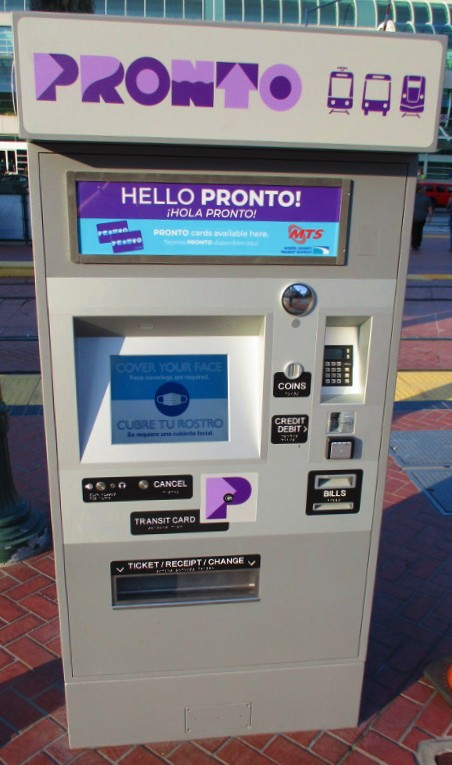
A PRONTO Smart Card Machine

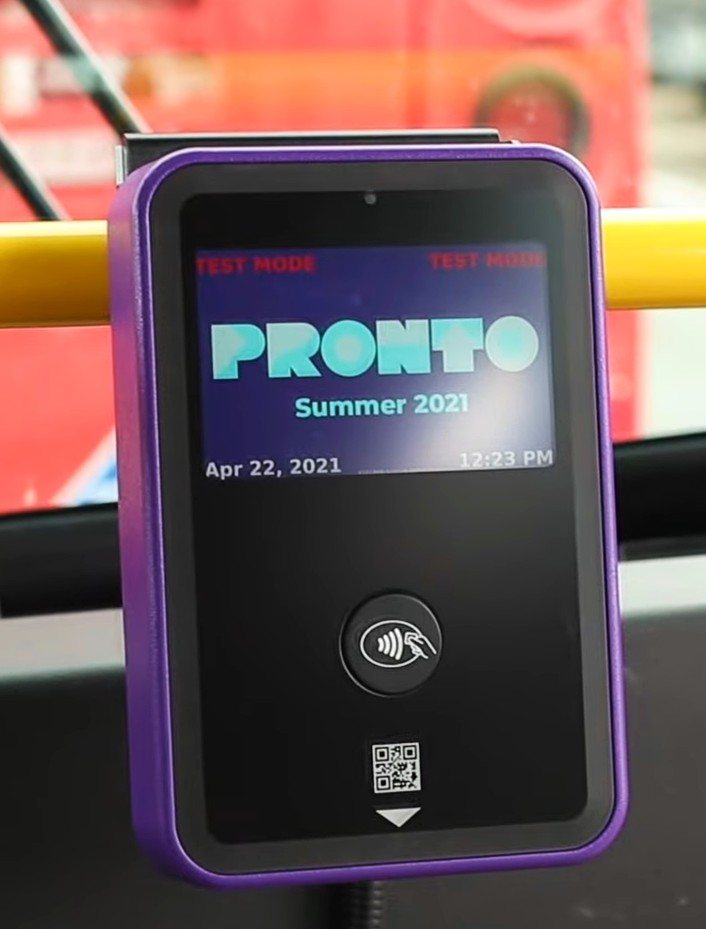
A PRONTO Smart Card On-Board Validator

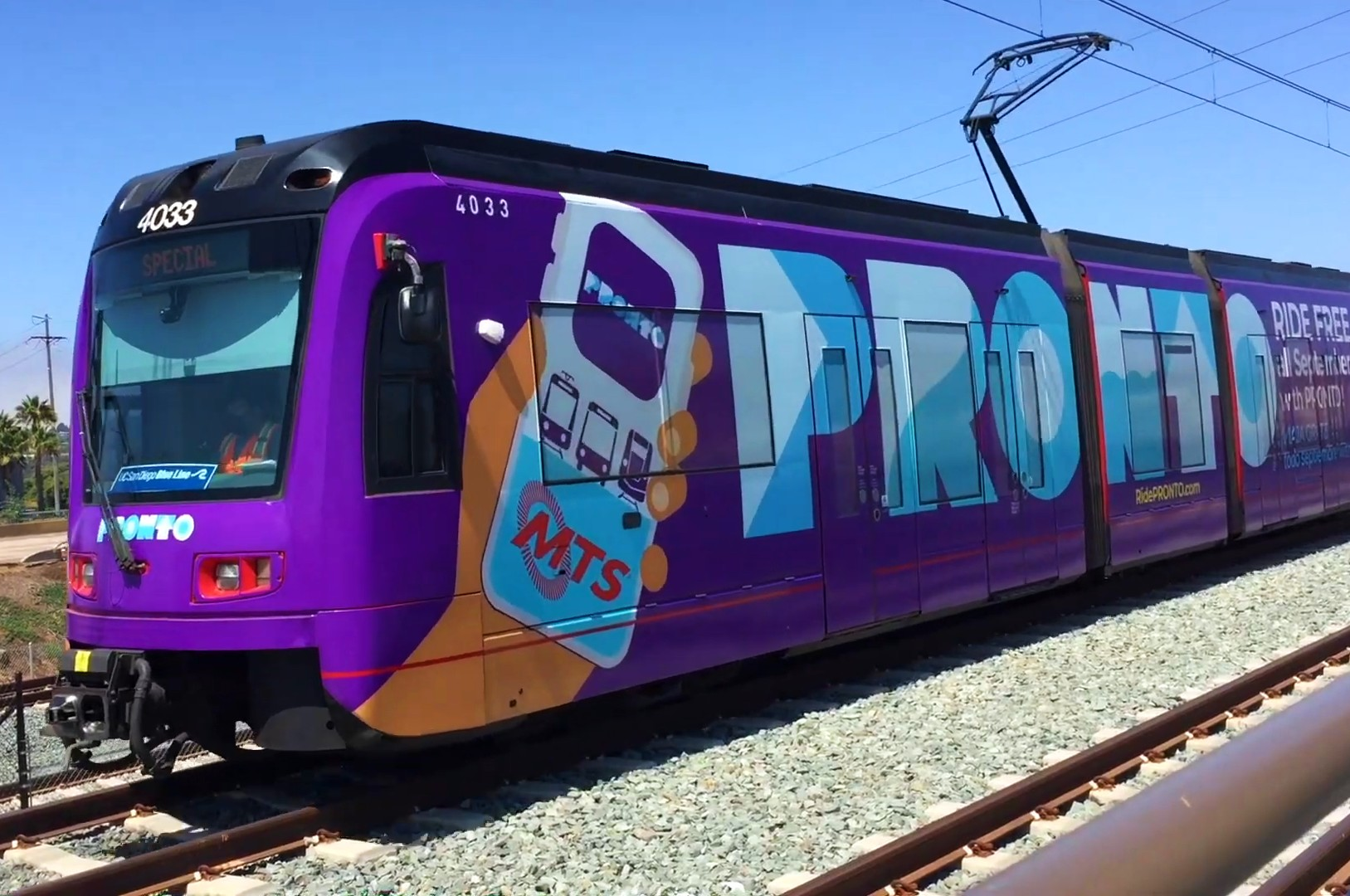
A San Diego Trolley unit advertising PRONTO

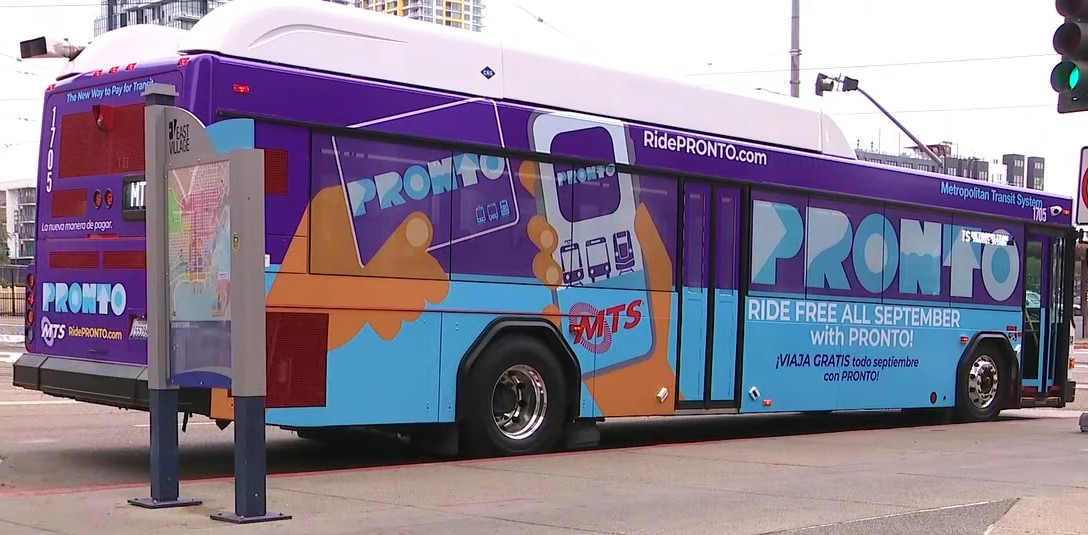
An MTS bus wrapped in a PRONTO advertisement

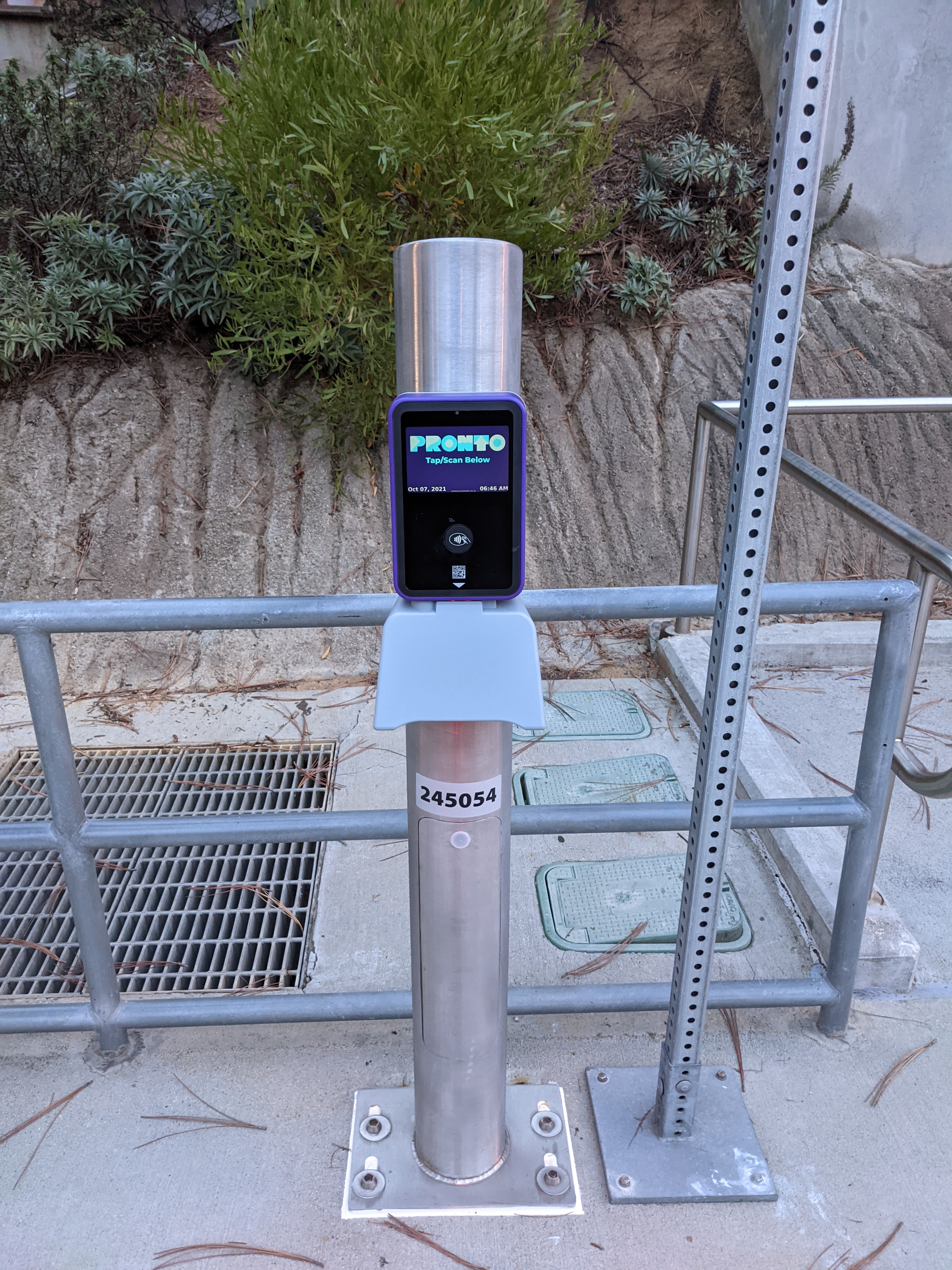
Pronto fare stand

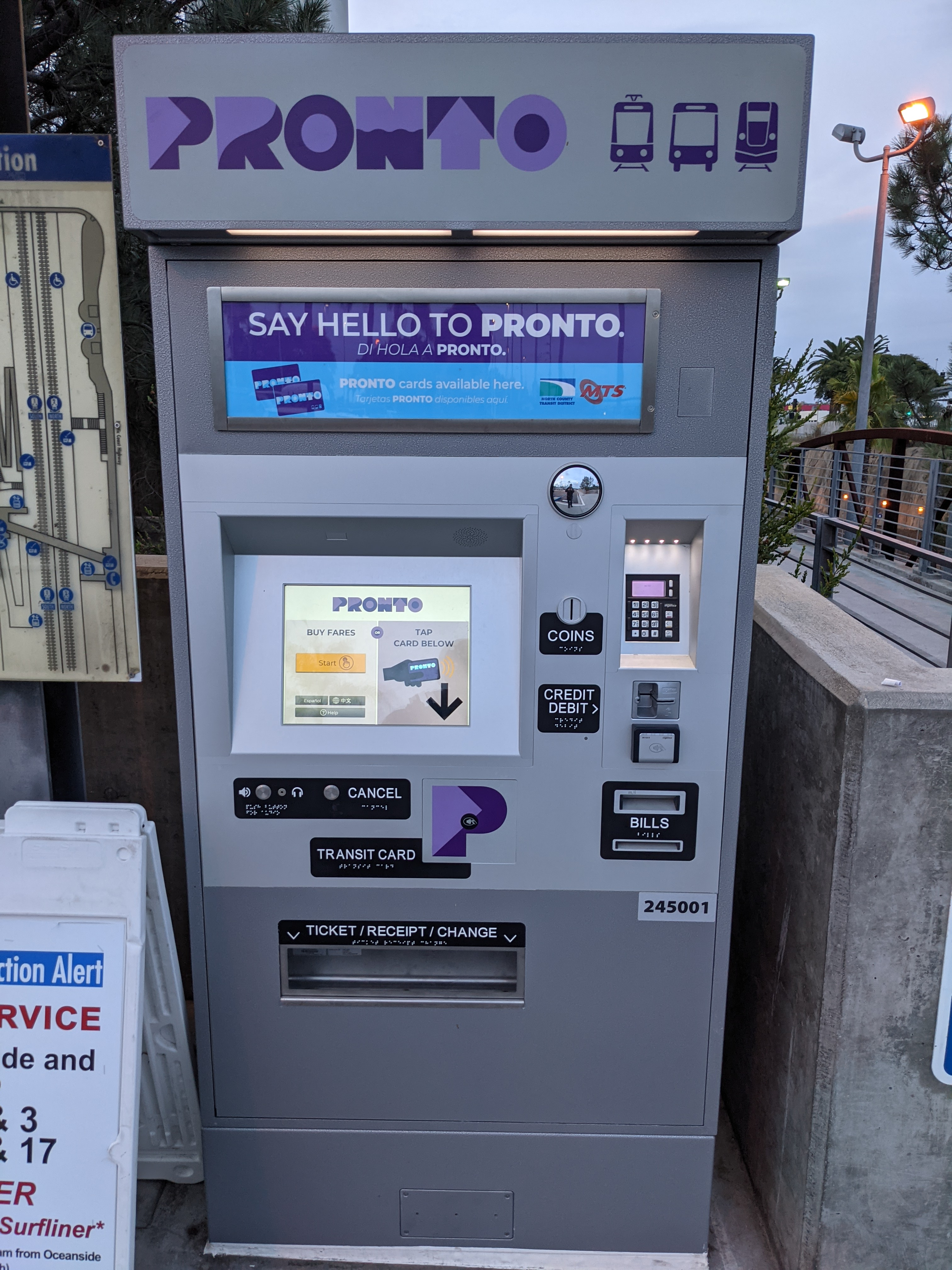
Pronto ticket machine

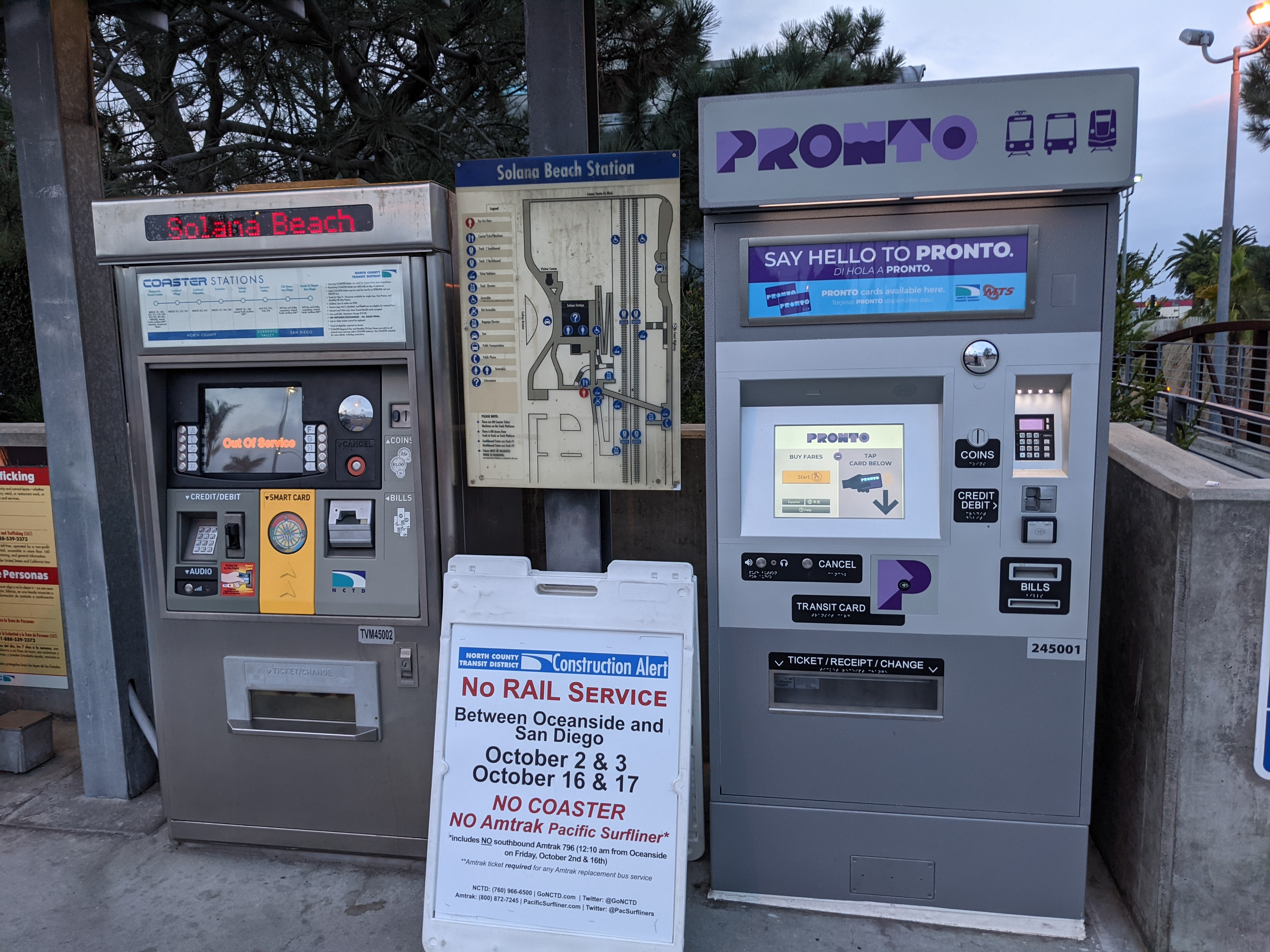
Pronto and Compass Ticket Machines
