= Compass Card (San Diego) =

Public transit smart card

- Compass Card Examples 2007 Series; Compass Card 2010 Series; Compass Card
- Location: San Diego County
- Launched: May 1, 2009 (Note: Official launch date; pilot testing began in September 2008, and paper monthly passes discontinued in 2010)
- Discontinued: August 31, 2021; 4 years ago
- Successor: Pronto
- Technology: MIFARE Classic 1K; TouchPass
- Operator: Cubic Transportation Systems
- Manager: San Diego Association of Governments (SANDAG)
- Currency: USD (Stored value credit; 4-day, 14-day and 30-day passes maximum load)
- Auto recharge: Available upon request for registered cardholders
- Validity: MTS Bus; MTS Trolley; NCTD Breeze; NCTD Coaster; NCTD Sprinter
- Retailed: Online; 5-1-1 San Diego; Ticket Vending Machines at Trolley and train stops; The Transit Store at 12th & Imperial Transit Center; Select Albertsons and check cashing locations
- Variants: Adult Compass Card; Youth Compass Card (50% Discount); Senior-Disabled-Medicare Compass Card (75% Discount)
- Website: http://compass.511sd.com

The Compass Card (Spanish: Tarjeta Compass) was the first-generation smart card used for automated fare collection on public transport services within San Diego County, California. Administered by the San Diego Association of Governments (SANDAG), it was valid on a number of different travel systems in San Diego County including MTS buses, the San Diego Trolley, North County Buses, the Coaster and the Sprinter. The system was operated by Cubic Transportation Systems. Phased out over the third quarter of 2021, it was discontinued on August 31, and its successor, Pronto, launched the following day.

== Description ==
The Compass Card was an orange or yellow, credit-card-sized contactless smartcard which held a transit pass. The Compass Card card must be tapped on electronic readers when entering and transferring within the system in order to validate it. Compass Card readers were integrated in bus fareboxes and standalone readers are located just outside the paid area of rail stations. Because the San Diego Trolley, Coaster and Sprinter operate on a proof-of-payment system, fare inspectors randomly checked to make sure Compass Card users have validated their cards by using a wireless handheld unit. The cards were "recharged" in person from TVMs in rail stations, at MTS or NCTD Transit Offices, at Albertsons stores, or online. The card is designed to reduce the number of transactions at customer service centers. Initially the San Diego Association of Governments only offered monthly passes on the compass card system-wide, and 14-day passes via telephone. Stored cash value cards were introduced in 2017, with plans in the future capable of automatically purchasing a day pass on the first tap.

== Capabilities ==
Customers are able to perform the following transactions at the corresponding locations with a Compass Card as indicated below:

Legend
Available and functioning
Available and functioning Full adult fare only

Locations	Buy a new card	Reload an existing card	Pay with cash	Pay with credit / debit	Sign up for auto reload	Register your card
The Transit Store						
Call 511 and say "Compass Card"						
Compass Card account management website						
Trolley, Coaster, and Sprinter ticket vending machines						
Select San Diego county Albertsons and check cashing locations and Transit Center "MTS Station Shops"						

== Implementation ==
The following process took place when a user tapped their card on a reader:

- Authenticates the microchip's serial number

(to avoid counterfeited or stolen cards)

- Reads the rider's balance and/or passes, and displays the results
- Reports the rider's activity to the Compass Card server

(rail validators synchronize data immediately, bus validators have a 12- to 24-hour delay)

- Writes the new balance and/or passes

(if applicable)

The next behavior depended on the reader:

- Displays a Thank You message along with a small green light for on-platform readers such as the Coaster, Sprinter, and San Diego Trolley.
- Shows green light and beeps once if Compass Card has valid fare, or shows a red light with an error message and beeps three times if the card is not valid or a read error occurs, for readers installed next to fareboxes. For passes, the expiration date of the pass is also displayed when the green light is lit and the reader beeps once.
- Beeps once if the Compass card has valid fare, or beeps three times if the card is not valid or a read error occurs, for readers integrated into the farebox. For passes, the expiration date of the pass is also displayed shortly after the reader beeps once.
- The driver's side computer will also show OK for a successful pass read. A type of frequency shift-keying that sounds different from the standard confirmation beep will occur for Youth or Senior/Disabled/Medicare passes that are valid, and the driver's side computer will show YTH for the Youth pass or SDM for the Senior/Disabled/Medicare pass.

Read errors that were displayed on the reader screen included, but not limited to:

- Invalid CRC.
- Invalid Card, can occur the first time on some readers even with a valid card, but if the card is valid a second attempt will register correctly. (The driver's side computer will show as NV for an invalid card error).
- Operation Failed, if an add value was initiated from the farebox computer but did not work.
- Read Error. (Seems to occur only on some readers integrated into the farebox, and turning the card sideways when tapping may work around this problem).
- Feedback used too soon. (The driver's side computer will show as FBK for a feedback related error).
- Already Touched.

== Benefits ==
SANDAG offered the following benefits to all Compass Card users:

- First Compass Card cost $2
- Automatic refill (registered users only)
- Pass or balance replacement on lost or stolen cards (does not cover the retail cost of a new card, $2 USD)
- Online store & card management
- Telephone customer service
- Photo ID integration (for senior-disabled-medicare or youth discount pass pass-holders only)*
- Compass Card users may purchase a 30-day "rolling pass" valid for 30 days from the date of purchase in addition to the traditional monthly pass good for a calendar month (monthly pass only for adult Sprinter/Breeze).
- 14-day passes could be loaded onto the Compass Card at the cost of 60% of a monthly pass (adult Regional and Premium passes only).

*Proof of eligibility will be needed at time of purchase and Photo ID will be printed on the compass card, replacing existing Transit IDs.

== Photo gallery ==
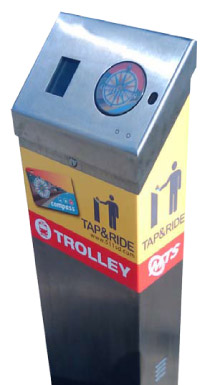
A Compass Card rail validator

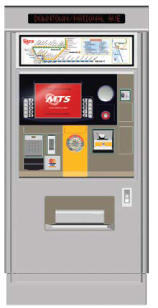
Computer rendering of a Compass Card ticket machine

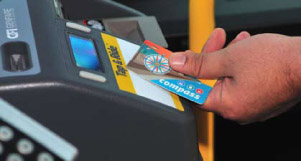
A Compass Card being tapped on an integrated farebox validator

Compass Card Validator Symbol
