= INIT SE =

Public transport technology company based in Karlsruhe, Germany

INIT

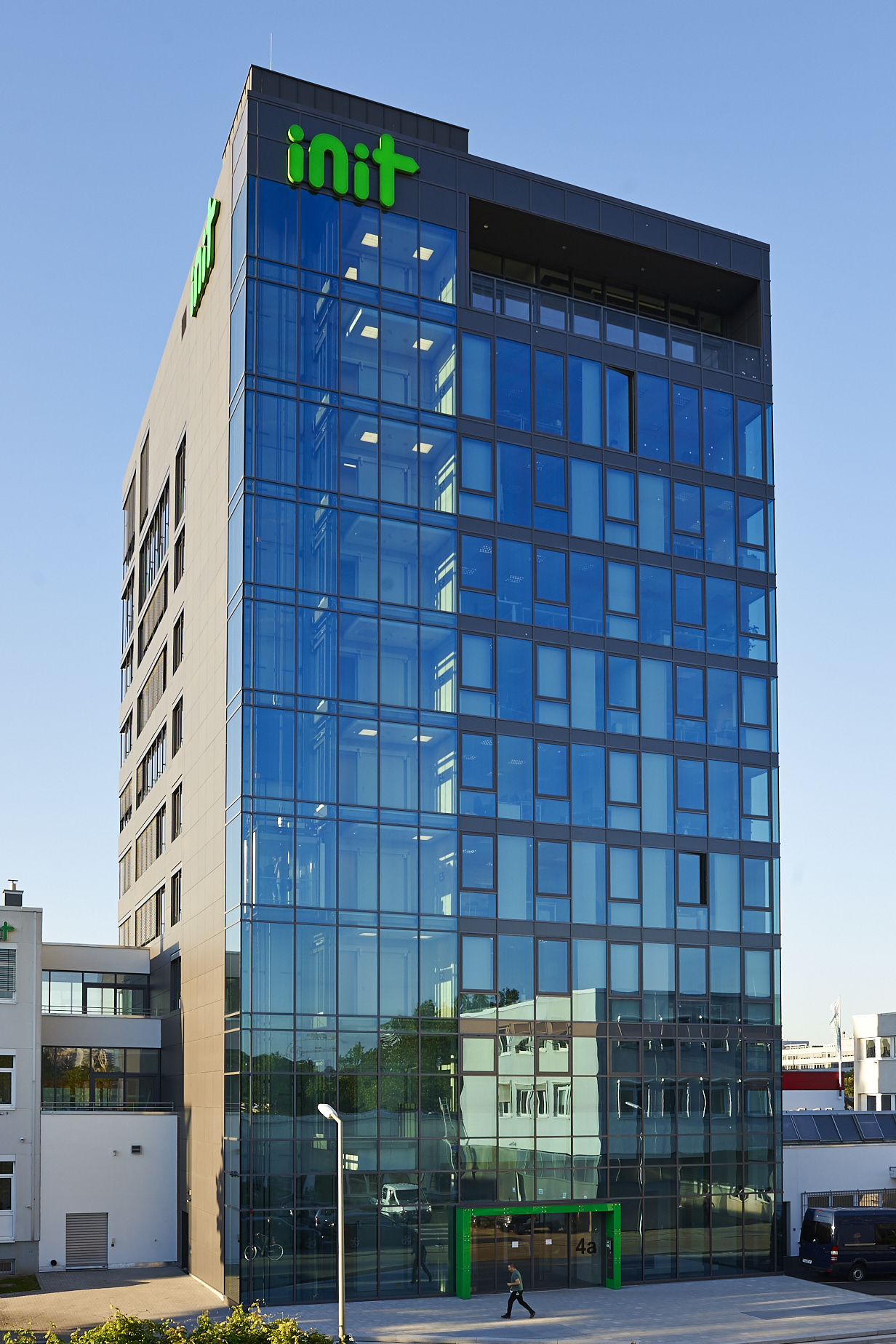
- Headquarters in Karlsruhe
- Company type: Societas Europaea
- ISIN: DE0005759807
- Industry: Technology
- Founded: 1983
- Founder: Gottfried Greschner
- Headquarters: Karlsruhe, Germany
- Website: initse.com

INIT Innovation in Traffic Systems SE is a German technology company serving the public transport market, based in Karlsruhe. The company was founded in 1983 by Gottfried Greschner, developing on his research on intelligent transportation systems at the University of Karlsruhe. INIT opened a North American subsidiary in Chesapeake, Virginia, in 1999, and has expanded to serve clients in the Middle East, Asia, and Oceania. The company provides software, hardware, and services for multiple functions in the public transport sector, including dispatching and service planning, ticketing and fare collection, and intelligent transportation systems.

== History ==
INIT was founded in 1983 by Dr. Gottfried Greschner, as a spinoff from the University of Karlsruhe. The company initially focused on bus fleet management, and expanded into other information technology services for the public transport industry.

INIT expanded into North America in the late 1990s. The company presented a demonstration of its intelligent transportation systems technology in 1997 in Akron, Ohio, and opened an office in Chesapeake, Virginia in 1999.

== Products ==
INIT provides hardware, software, and services for the public transport industry. The company's products include ticket machines, passenger information systems, and computer-aided dispatch systems.

In addition to its hardware and software products, the company also provides integration services. An example of this is the REGIOMOVE platform for the Karlsruher Verkehrsverbund, where INIT contributed to the development of a unified mobile app for regional public transport services in Karlsruhe.

In March 2024 Transport for London (TfL) announced that they had awarded a £160m contract over 10 years to INIT for the replacement of their existing bus location system.

INIT products

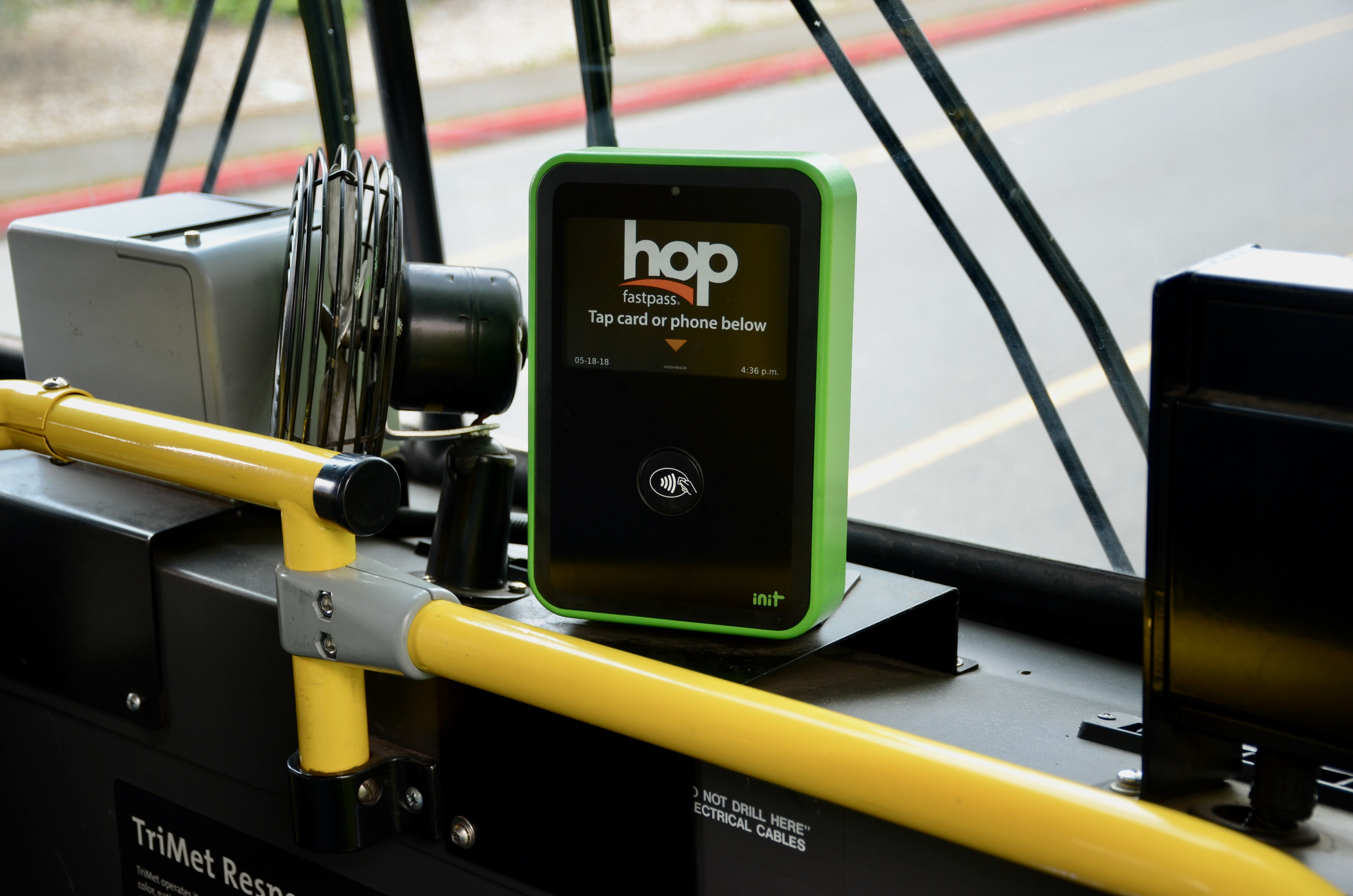
PROXmobile 3 card reader for the Hop Fastpass ticketing system, Portland, Oregon, United States

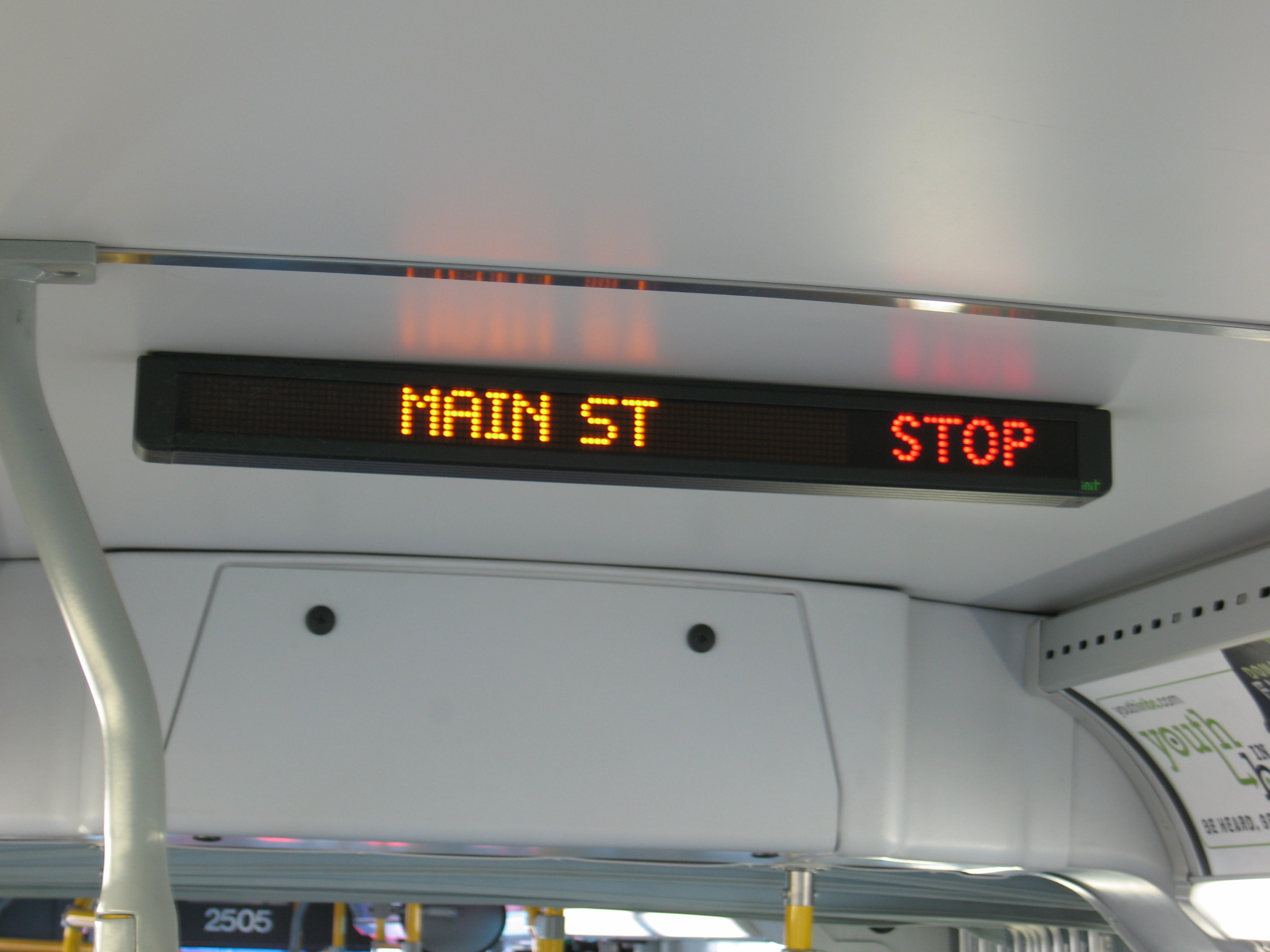
PIDmobil 3 passenger information display, installed in a TransLink bus in Vancouver, British Columbia, Canada

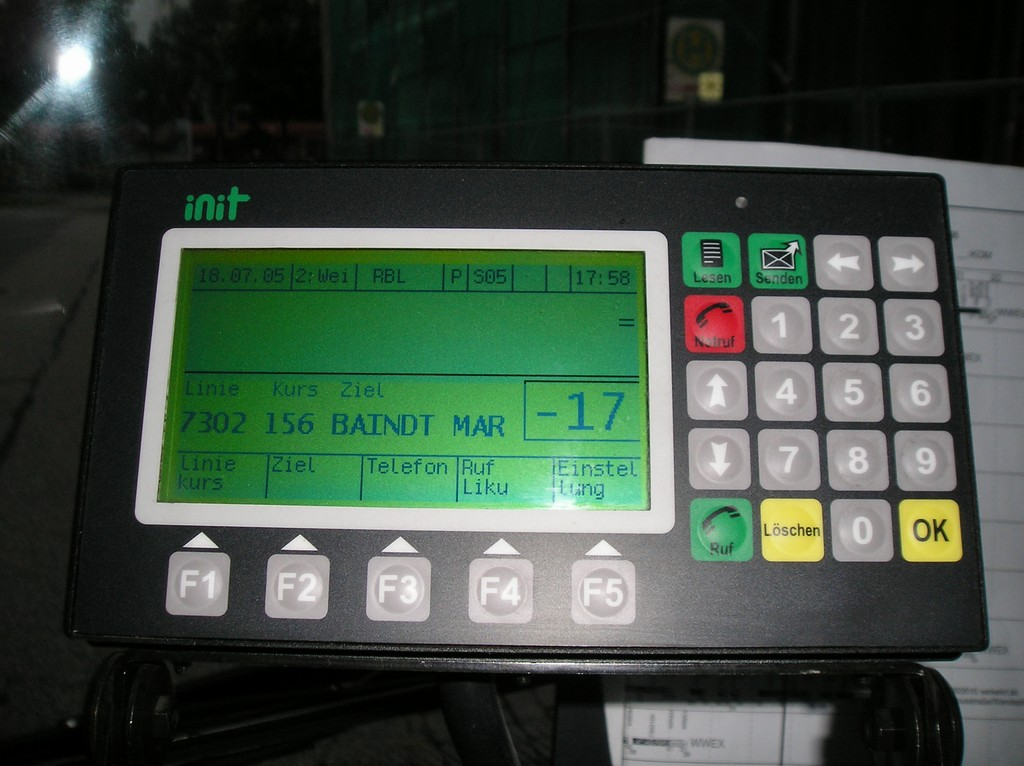
An older INIT Mobile data terminal installed in a Regionalverkehr Alb-Bodensee bus

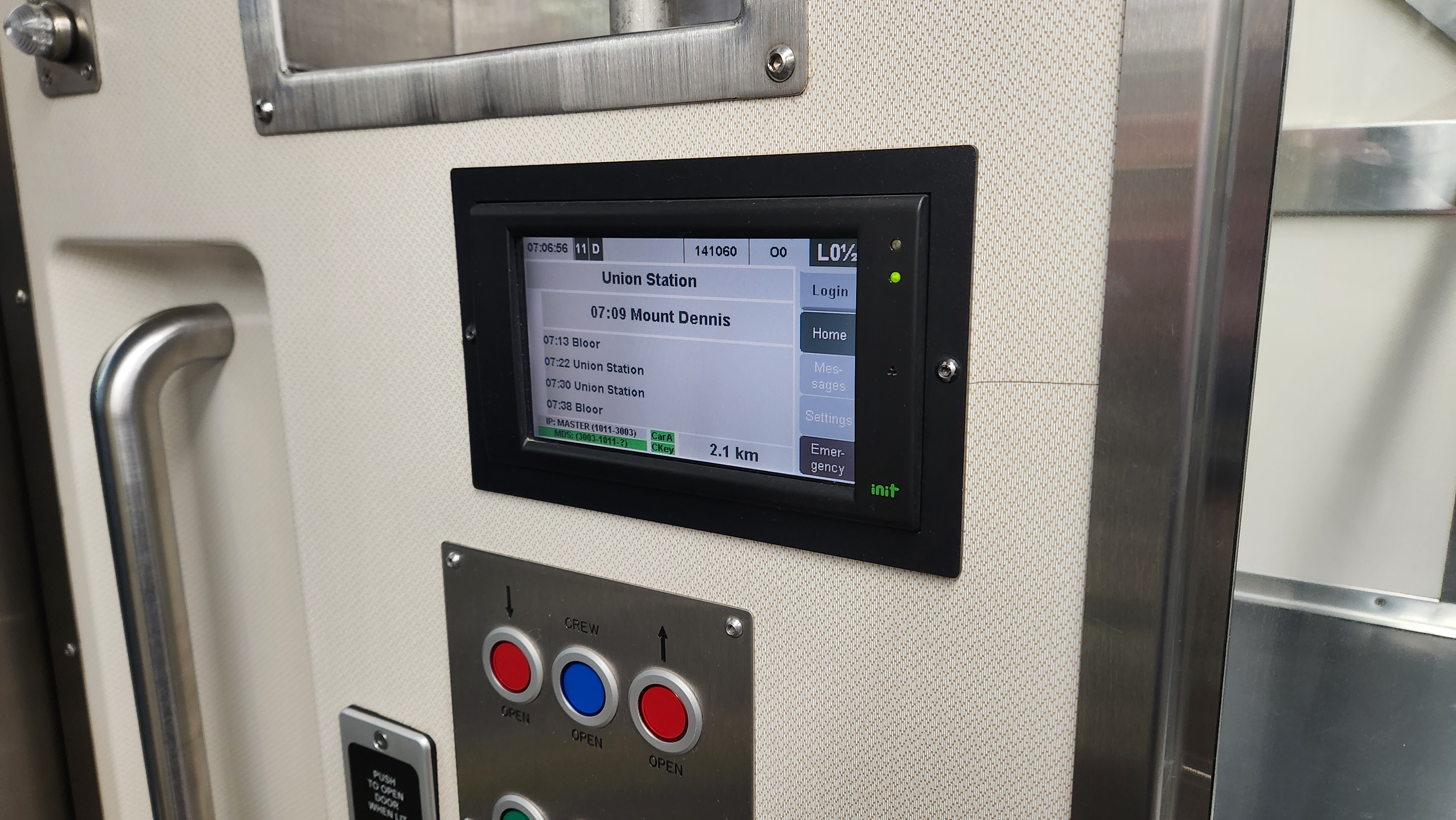
A newer INIT mobile data terminal onboard an UP Express train

== Locations ==
INIT has its head office is in Karlsruhe, in the southern German state of Baden-Württemberg. The company has 6 additional offices in Germany, and 7 locations elsewhere in Europe. The North American headquarters are in Chesapeake, Virginia, and the company also has offices in the United Arab Emirates, Singapore, Australia, and New Zealand.
