= Stonewood Center =

- Location: 251 Stonewood Street Downey, California 90241
- Coordinates: 33.9355°N 118.1194°W
- Opened: Originally October 9, 1958; 68 years ago, reopened October 1990
- Developer: E. Morris Smith
- Manager: Macerich
- Owner: Macerich
- Num. of stores: 150
- Num. of anchor tenants: 3 (JCPenney, Macy's, & Kohls) 1 under construction (to become Round 1)
- Floor area: 939,423 square feet (GLA)
- Floors: 1 (2 in JCPenney, Kohls, and Macy's)
- Website: http://www.shopstonewoodcenter.com/

Stonewood Center, sometimes referred to as Stonewood Mall, is a shopping mall located in Downey, California, which is one of the Gateway Cities of Southeastern Los Angeles County. It is located at the intersection of Firestone and Lakewood Boulevards, and it is from this intersection that the mall's name is derived ("Firestone" + "Lakewood"). It is within a few miles of many freeways in the area: I-5 and I-605, I-710 and I-105 freeways. The mall is owned and operated by The Macerich Company and is part of its pair of malls in southeast Los Angeles County along with the Los Cerritos Center in Cerritos, California.

Stonewood Center comprises 143 stores, including several restaurants.

The mall is anchored by J. C. Penney, Macy's (formerly Robinsons-May), Kohl's (formerly Mervyn's). A Round1 & Spocha will open inside the old Sears anchor building in 2026.

== History ==
Before Stonewood Center, in the 1940s and 1950s, Downtown Huntington Park was the most popular upscale shopping district for residents of Downey, South Gate, Bell, and Cudahy.

In 1953, William M. Lansdale of Downey announced plans to establish Downey as the next shopping "mecca" in the area and build a 63-acre shopping center.

The mall was developed by E. Morris Smith of Newport Beach and on a budget variously reported as $5,000,000 or $12,000,000, on a 62-acre (25 ha) site and designed by Jacobson, Coppedge & Huxley, The mall's original name was going to be the Lansdale Shopping center. Then Later, the name changed to Stonewood, an abbreviation of the shopping center's location - Firestone at Lakewood, once one of the busiest intersections in the world. The original plan was for five buildings with over 60 stores and over 335,000 square feet (31,100 m2) of gross leasable area. Construction was kicked off in late 1957.

Prior to the opening of the mall proper, in February 1956, construction began with a $750,000 coffee shop and restaurant, Stonewood Restaurant, designed by Pereira & Luckman, who also designed the Theme Building at Los Angeles International Airport and numerous other Greater Los Angeles mid-century landmark buildings. Downey Stonewood Community Bank and a 40,000-square-foot Shopping Bag Food Stores also opened during this time.

The mall opened on October 9, 1958, with a larger gross leasable area than the original plan (390,000 square feet (36,000 m2)) and 40 stores including J. C. Penney, W. T. Grant and Woolworth variety stores, Thrifty Drug, Miller, Miller West Men's, Downey Music and Hollander Cafeteria.

In the 1960s, the mall was expanded with a 143,400-square-foot (13,320 m2) Broadway department store (opened 1965, now a Sears), and in 1966, Farrell's Ice Cream Parlour, Showcase Cinemas, an additional twin cinema, and a Radio Shack. In 1969 JCPenney Moved from a smaller space in the mall to a larger spot in the northwest part in the mall. A new anchor space was constructed for JCPenney, Being much larger than their old space.

In the 1970s, the center grew, taking up more of the original land, with almost 80 stores & 2 anchors.

A 2-story Mervyn's (now Kohl's) was added in 1981.

In 1986, Stonewood was sold to Hughes Investments. The mall was facing fierce competition from other nearby indoor malls at the time like Lakewood Center, Whittwood Mall, & The newly opened Santa Fe Springs Mall and Montebello Town Center at the time.

In 1990, an $100-million transformation (funded by Hughes Investments) into an enclosed mall was completed which included over 40 new stores, a new "Filling Station" Gas station themed food court, a May Company California department store anchor, and Acapulco and Olive Garden restaurants. By the mid-1990s, the center had almost 940,000 square feet (87,000 m2) of gross leasable area.

In 1993, the May Company rebranded as Robinson's-May, and in 2006 it was rebranded as Macy's as well as the home store.

In 1996, The Broadway closed its branch, and Sears took over the building and built a Sears Auto Center in an outparcel. As of 2025 a faint BROADWAY labelscar can be seen from the mall parking lot towards the west part of the building

In 2009, Mervyn's liquidated and closed all their locations, Including their Stonewood Center anchor space. Kohl's opened in October that year after taking the leases of 31 former Mervyn's stores, which included their Stonewood Center store. BJ's Restaurant also opened the same year at the former CitiBank next to Macy's Home store.

In 2021, It was announced Sears was closing its anchor store at the mall as a plan to close more stores, the store closed on November 14, 2021, leaving the mall its first vacant anchor. Also in 2021, photos went viral of an abandoned drained pool underneath the mall. The pool used to be a part of the "Nautilus Gym" from when the mall was still outdoors which also had a sauna and restrooms. Then when the mall was enclosed the whole underground gym section was mostly "honeycombed" from the rest of the enclosed mall. The pool has sat abandoned since with few people having access to it. The abandoned pool is located under the management office by the Macy's.

In 2022, the mall received a renovation to its mall entrances and welcome signs from the parking lot.

In 2024, Round 1 submitted conceptual plans to turn the old Sears anchor into a Round 1 family-friendly bowling and arcade center.

In 2025, it was announced that parts of the mall interior and food court would be renovated to give a more modern aesthetic. Construction would also start on gutting the old Sears building for a Round 1.

As of 2026, the mall is at around 90% occupancy which includes vacant spaces only accessible from the outside.

== Transit ==
Stonewood Center is accessible through a variety of regional and local transit options, including LA Metro lines 111, 115, 117, 120, 127, 265, and 266. The Downey LINK shuttle provides specialized local service with multiple routes stopping directly at or near the mall's perimeter. For those utilizing the Metro C Line, the Norwalk Station & Lakewood Blvd Station serve as a primary connection point for transferring to buses headed toward the shopping center. Additionally, the mall serves as a regional stop for FlixBus, with its boarding area conveniently located near the southeast entrance.

== Legacy ==
The mall has been a retail hotspot for Downey and surrounding areas for decades since the mall was built. From having stores like WT Grant & Woolworth in the 60's to having stores like KB Toys, Sam Goody & Waldenbooks in the 90's and having stores like Hot topic, H&M & Bath & Body works in the present day.

Today some of its '60s architecture can still be seen with the JCPenney anchor and vacant Sears. The mall also has some '90s architecture from the 1990 renovation, such as the marble entrances to JCPenney & Macy's from inside the mall & in the exterior of the mall entrances.

In 2023, "The Button Hole" plaque and wall gap was rededicated, It was originally put in place at the request of Wallace C. Button. Button would enjoy walking the area of the mall when it was still an open field and farmland. When the mall was built in 1958, he requested that when they put the wall up that they leave this gap so he could continue his routine, and his request was granted. When Button died in 1969, A plaque was dedicated next to the wall gap in his honor. However in 2016-17 the plaque was stolen, Leading to the rededication in 2023. It is located on the northwest side of the mall near JCPenney and next to the Firestone Complete auto care center.
