= Asher Hamburger =

German-born American department store founder (1821–1897)

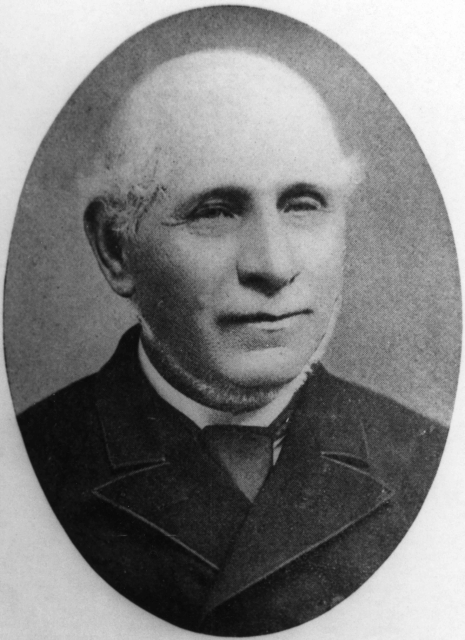
- Born: 1821; Bavaria
- Died: 1897 (aged 75–76)
- Occupation: Businessman
- Known for: Founder of A. Hamburger & Sons
- Spouse: Hanna Hamburger
- Children: 5

Asher Hamburger (1821–1897) was an American businessman who was the founder of the A. Hamburger & Sons department store, the largest department store in the Western United States at the beginning of the 20th century. After selling the department store in 1923, it was renamed as May Company California.

== Biography ==
Hamburger was born to a Jewish family at Kerche Schönbache or Altenschönbach, near Würzburg, Bavaria, in 1821. When young, he was apprenticed to a ropemaker. He came to the United States in 1839 and settled in New York City, where he first worked in a tassel factory, then moved to Pennsylvania, where he began a small general store.

From there he went to Alabama, where he was naturalized in 1848 as a U.S. citizen and, in partnership with two brothers, he started in business, opening three stores along the Tombigbee River. In 1849, after gold was discovered in California, he and a brother went west, to Sacramento, where they founded a business, which was burned out twice in the fires which swept the city. In 1851 two of his brothers moved to San Francisco, leaving Asher in charge of the Sacramento store.

He and Hannah Bien were married in New York in 1855.

A few years later, the brothers began a wholesale dry-goods firm in San Francisco under the name Hamburger Brothers, where they conducted the Maze, a large department store. After 1865, Asher Hamburger returned to Sacramento to take over the old stores. In 1881 he went to Los Angeles and founded a business, A. Hamburger & Sons, operating as The People's Store, which became the largest dry goods (or department) store in Southern California, catering to working class customers.

In 1874 he was living in Sacramento, California, in 1890, he was at 610 O'Farrell Street in San Francisco, and in 1896 he was at 1424 McAllister in the same city. In that year, he was described in a voting register as five feet five and one half inches tall, with blue eyes and white hair. He was listed as a storekeeper.

In 1908, his firm built the Hamburger Building, the "Great White Store" at Eighth and Broadway, now better known as the Downtown Los Angeles May Co. Building, which at that time was the largest retail building in the West and the country's largest steel-frame structure. Attached to the south end was Hamburger's Majestic Theatre, built for stage shows and opera. It was turned into a motion picture theater and later torn down to become a parking lot.

On March 31, 1923, the Hamburgers sold their store to the May family of St. Louis for $8.5 million.

Hamburger died of a cerebral hemorrhage on December 1, 1897, in the family home on McAllister Street, leaving his widow, Hanna, four sons and a daughter. He was interred at Home of Peace Cemetery (East Los Angeles).

== Legacy ==
The Hamburger children founded a home for Jewish "business girls" or "working girls in the lower income group" in Los Angeles at Girard and (1255) Union avenues (in the Pico-Union neighborhood), opened around 1927. A new campus was opened in 1954 at 7357 Hollywood Boulevard because the former property was seen as "unsuited for young women" since the district had become "industrialized."
