= The Shops at Mission Viejo =

Shopping mall in California

- Exterior to the Shops at Mission Viejo in 2026
- Location: Mission Viejo, California, USA
- Coordinates: 33.558312°N 117.668896°W
- Address: 555 The Shops At Mission Viejo
- Opened: October 11, 1979; 47 years ago
- Developer: Edward J. DeBartolo Corporation
- Manager: Simon Property Group
- Owner: CalPERS; Miller Capital Advisory; Simon Property Group (51%)
- Architect: Ladd & Kelsey
- Num. of stores: 159
- Num. of anchor tenants: 4
- Floor area: 1,249,749 sq ft (116,105.5 m^{2})
- Floors: 2
- Parking: Parking lot, parking garage
- Website: Official Website

The Shops at Mission Viejo (originally the Mission Viejo Mall) is a shopping mall located in Mission Viejo, California. It is anchored by 2 Macy's locations, Round1, Nordstrom & Dick's Sporting Goods. The Shops at Mission Viejo is managed by Simon Malls, who owns 51% of it.

== History ==
The mall opened in 1979 as the Mission Viejo Mall, anchored by Bullock's, May Company, J.W. Robinson's, and Montgomery Ward. The mall featured a three-screen Edwards movie theater, which was closed in 1998 and replaced that same year by the 10-screen Edwards Kaleidoscope across the street. Both Robinson's and May Company became Robinsons-May in 1993 while Bullock's became Macy's in 1996. In the year 1999, it underwent a $150 million renovation and expansion that brought many new retailers, including Nordstrom (replaced Montgomery Ward) and Saks Fifth Avenue. The original mall had been criticized since its opening for its poor interior lighting, a product of the 1970s energy crisis. The 1999 renovation greatly brightened the interior.

In 2000, Macy's remodeled and expanded the store while Robinsons-May consolidated the two stores as one, closing the former J.W. Robinson's store down (gutted out into a food court) and expanding the former May Company store. In 2006, the newly expanded Robinsons-May store became a second Macy's store, devoting it into a women's and home store. The other Macy's store formerly Bullock's became a men's, children's, and furniture store. Since remodeling/expanding, The Shops at Mission Viejo has featured a mix of upscale and mid-tier retailers, including the country's second Microsoft Store. It was during this renovation where the mall adopted its current name. In 2010, Saks Fifth Avenue closed, which later became Forever 21 (closed in 2019 due to bankruptcy; has since reopened in a non-anchor space). On February 17, 2018, the new kids play area was opened to the public. In 2021, the former Forever 21 space was converted to Dick's Sporting Goods. In addition to renovating and expanding, Simon Malls signed 10-year leases with many stores to secure its investment.

The Japanese Arcade and Entertainment company Round1 opened a location in 2024. Mall occupancy remains strong as of 2024 with most spaces being occupied with the opening of Round1.
