= Majestic Theatre (Los Angeles) =

Former theater in downtown Los Angeles, California, United States

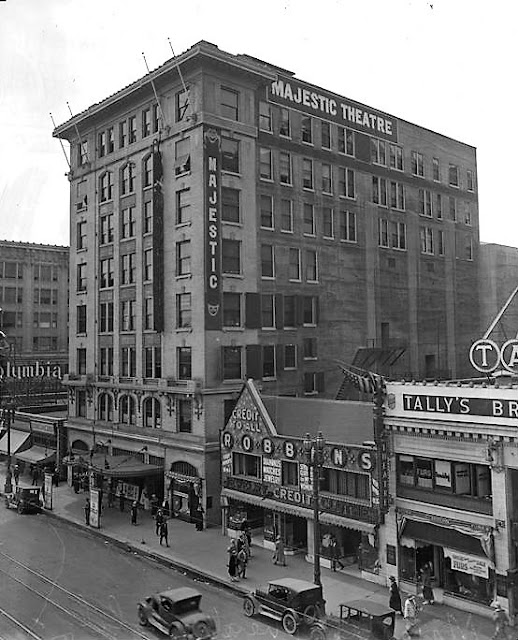
- The building c. 1920
- Interactive map of Majestic Theatre
- Address: 845 South Broadway; Los Angeles
- Coordinates: 34.04315°N 118.25598°W
- Capacity: 1600
- Type: Live and movie theater

Construction
- Opened: November 23, 1908
- Renovated: 1915
- Closed: 1931 or 1933
- Demolished: May 1933
- Architects: Edelman & Barnett

Majestic Theatre, also known as Asher Hamburger’s Majestic Theatre, was a theater located in downtown Los Angeles.

== History ==
Majestic Theatre was designed by Edelman & Barnett and built by Mayberry & Parker for Asher Hamburger in 1908. Oliver Morosco was the lessee. The theater sat 1600 and its interior was decorated by Antoon Molkenboer. The cost of construction for the entire building was $250,000 ($8.96 million in 2025).

Majestic Theatre's first showing, on November 23, 1908, was a Shubert production of The Land of Nod starring Knox Wilson. The theater quickly became the preferred venue for traveling Broadway productions. It was also the venue of choice for Lon Chaney in 1910 and Ramon Novarro worked as an usher here before becoming a film star.

In 1913, on the opening night of the Kolb and Dill show, Lon Chaney's wife Cleva interrupted the performance and attempted suicide onstage. She survived but the scandal ended her singing career and forced Lon Chaney out of live theater. The theater itself also lost favor with Broadway, and two years later, it was converted to a moviehouse. A $5,000 ($159,128 in 2025) Wurlitzer organ was added as part of the conversion, and movie ticket prices ranged between 25 and 75 cents ($7.96 and $23.87 as of 2025).

In 1926, the theater partnered with Orange Grove Theatre to show vaudeville and burlesque, after which it was subject to numerous police raids for indecency violations. The theater closed in 1931 or 1933. It was demolished in 1933.

== Architecture and design ==
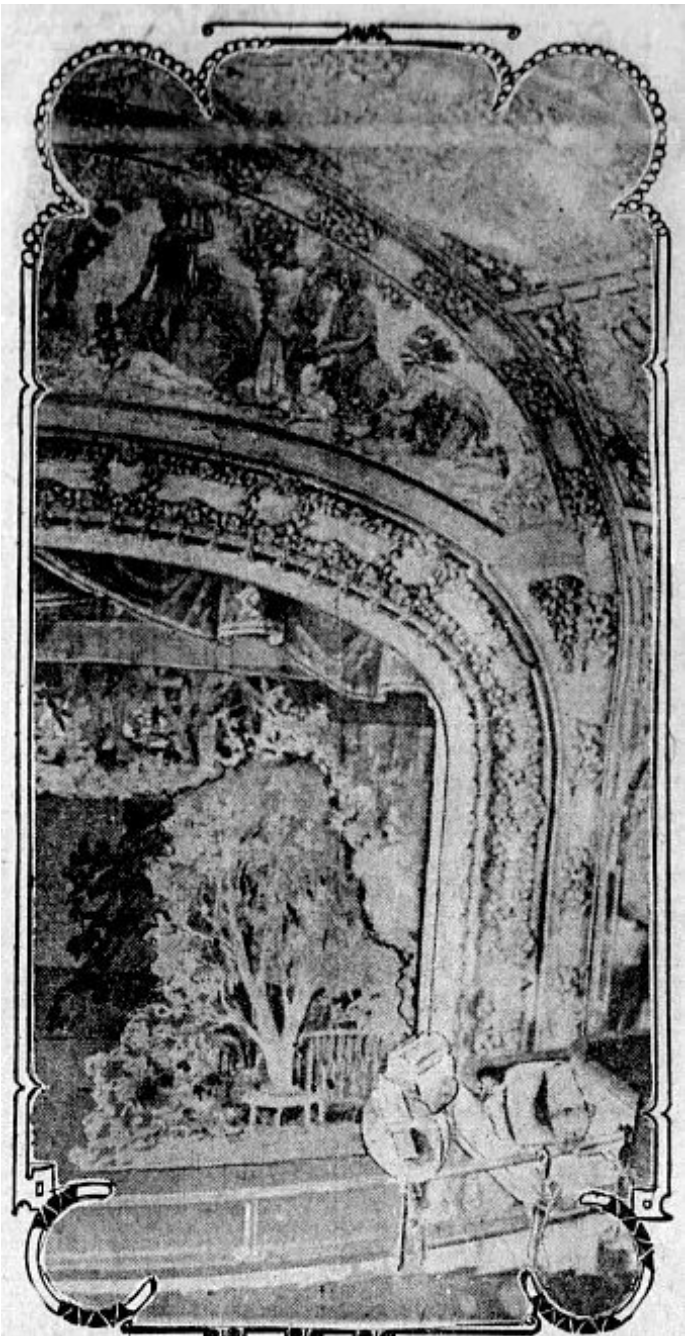
A portion of the theater's stage, proscenium, and mural above the proscenium

Oliver Morosco believed New York's Amsterdam Theatre was the finest in the country and so he made this theater "almost a duplicate" albeit at less expense. However, he did change some decorations, as Amsterdam Theatre featured a peacock, which Morosco believed was "even worse than [the number] thirteen." For this theater, Morosco used birds of paradise instead. Overall, the theater had an Art Nouveau design, and its other decorative motifs included a crown made of stucco and orange trees with leaves and fruit.

This theater originally featured a 38-by-80-foot (12 m × 24 m) stage with a 64-foot (20 m) ceiling and 36-foot (11 m) proscenium. Above the proscenium was a larger-than-life sixteen figure mural painted by Molkenboer and named The Casts of Progress. The entire theater's ceiling was made of suspended metal and plaster; it and the three floors above it were all held up by three large, exposed trusses supported by massive columns, each made of reinforced concrete and holding 500,000 or 750,000 pounds (230,000 or 340,000 kg). The color scheme for the theater was green and old rose highlighted with gold.

Theater seating consisted of one orchestra and two cantilevered horseshoe balcony levels, as well as ten boxes, five on each side of the proscenium. The cantilevered balconies projected 27 feet (8.2 m) and 30 feet (9.1 m), making them the longest known non-bridge cantilevers of their time, while the boxes projected 6 feet (1.8 m). No two boxes on one side of the proscenium were the same height; instead the rail of each box was level with the head of the occupant of its nearer-to-the-stage neighbor. Each seat in the theater had its own heat and air conditioning, with pipes connecting the seat to the main system.

The theater's entrance lobby was 30 feet (9.1 m) wide and featured the same color scheme as the theater, although darker and more severe. The foyer was vaulted and groined and extended the entire width of the building. Both the lobby and foyer featured high wainscoting made of marble, plate glass panels, and mahogany trim. The basement housed a cafe, bathrooms, music and property rooms, dressing rooms for actors, an additional dressing room for women, and a smoking room for men. The dressing room for women was colored green and old rose and featured a fireplace and ten mirrors set into the wall, while the smoking room was green and brown and also featured a fireplace. The cafe was available to the entire building, not just the theater.

The building that housed the theater was made of reinforced concrete and consisted of eight floors and a basement, with building's upper three floors extending over Majestic Theatre, an unusual feature for the time, and the basement extending under the sidewalk outside. The first five floors contained Majestic Theatre as well as 100 offices, the sixth and seventh featured studios for musicians and other artists, and the top floor housed an acting school complete with its own 30 by 68 feet (9.1 m × 20.7 m) assembly hall that sat 250 to 300 people. The basement was entirely part of Majestic Theatre. The building's facade featured colored tile and cement trim on the first floor, with pressed brick and raked joints above. Alleys on either side of the building provided emergency exits for Majestic Theatre's auditorium as well as direct access to the stage and to fire escapes that served the rest of the building.
