= El Rancho Santa Anita Shopping Center =

Shopping center in California, US

Coordinates: 34.13216°N 118.06651°W

El Rancho Santa Anita Shopping Center in Arcadia, California was one of the first planned shopping centers in suburban Los Angeles, opened in 1948–1950, and later anchored by a large May Company department store. The May Company building is now empty, but the center remains anchored by a supermarket.

== History ==
In April 1940, Santa Anita Village, an early suburban housing development, petitioned the Arcadia city council for a zoning change to permit an 18-acre shopping center along Huntington Drive at Michillinda to be known as the Santa Anita Village Shopping Center.

When the shopping center opened in 1948, it advertised as the El Rancho Santa Anita Shopping Center. It opened with a supermarket in 1948 but the official opening wasn't until 1950, when it also opened the first elevator in Arcadia.

Competition nearby at the time included a local department store, Hinshaw's in a retail cluster along Baldwin Avenue, but the much larger Santa Anita Fashion Park was only built much later in 1974.

On October 8, 1966, the May Company opened a large 240,000-square-foot (22,000 m^{2}) branch here, its fourteenth store in California, designed by Victor Gruen and Associates with Spanish colonial interiors by Welton Becket and Associates. The store closed in the late 1980s and was bought by Vons Cos., parent company of Vons supermarkets, and converted to that company's new headquarters until the brand was purchased by Albertsons, and the headquarters function was moved to Albertsons' regional office in Fullerton.
