= May Company California =

American department store chain

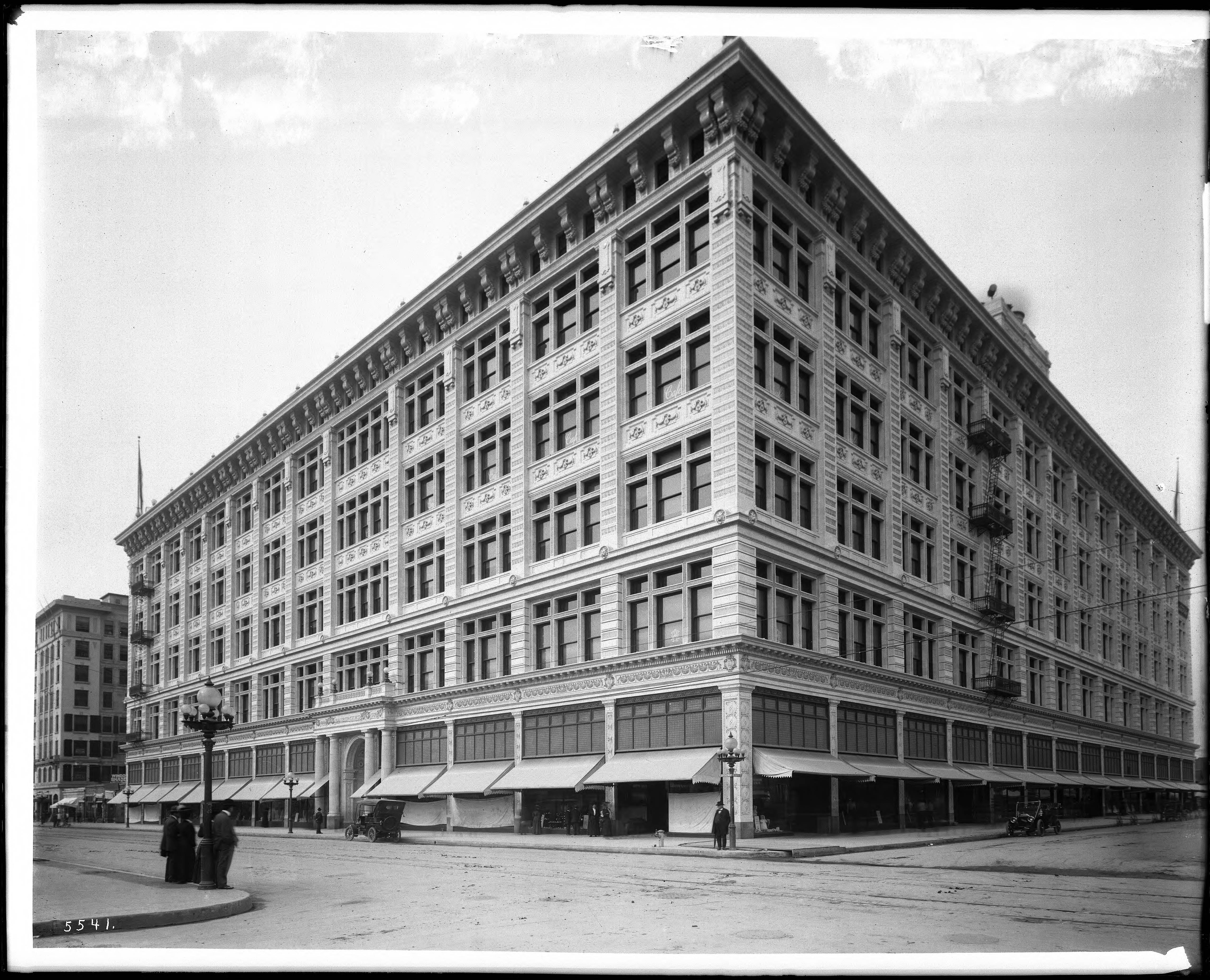
- Exterior of the May Company Building flagship store in downtown Los Angeles (c. 1912)
- Formerly: A. Hamburger & Sons
- Type: Division
- Industry: Retail
- Genre: Department stores
- Founded: October 29, 1881; 145 years ago in Los Angeles, California, United States
- Founder: Asher Hamburger
- Defunct: January 31, 1993; 33 years ago
- Fate: Merged with J. W. Robinson's
- Successor: Robinsons-May
- Headquarters: Los Angeles, California, United States
- Areas served: Southern California
- Products: Clothing; footwear; bedding; furniture; jewelry; beauty products; housewares
- Parent: The May Department Stores Company (1923–1993)

May Company California was an American department store chain founded in 1881 as A. Hamburger & Sons by Asher Hamburger. It was renamed after its acquisition by The May Department Stores Company in 1923. Its flagship store and headquarters were located in Los Angeles, and operated throughout Southern California. It is well-known for its flagship store in downtown Los Angeles and branch store at Wilshire Boulevard and Fairfax Avenue, the latter of which has been featured in several vintage films. The 1926 garage building at 9th Street and Hill Street was one of the first parking structures in the United States, and is a Los Angeles Historic-Cultural Monument.

May Company California briefly operated in Nevada when Goldwater's was merged into May Company California and its Las Vegas store was converted. May Company California and J. W. Robinson's were merged and individually dissolved to form Robinsons-May in 1993.

== 19th-century history ==
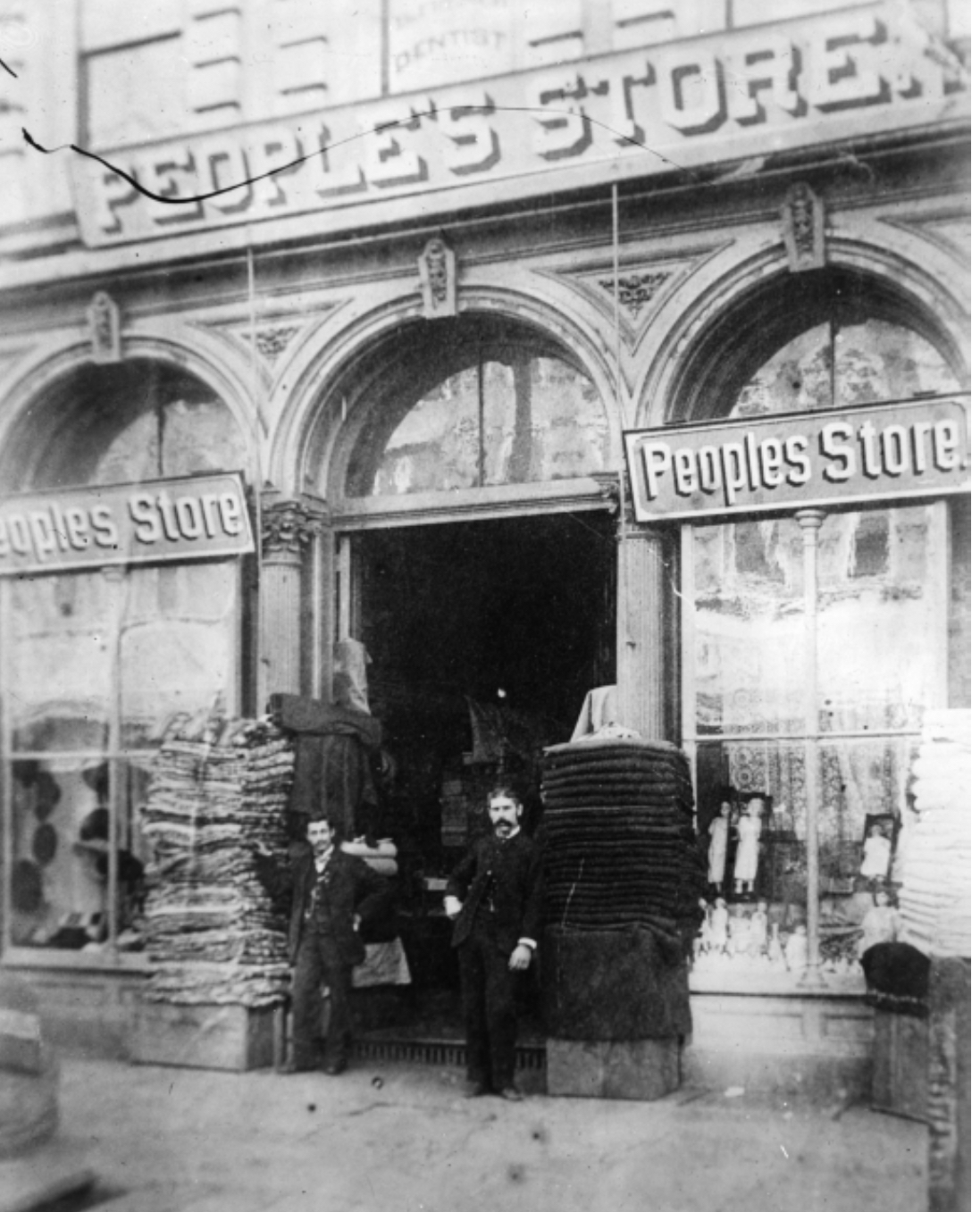
Hamburger's People's Store Spring Street (early 1880s)

May Company California can trace its roots to the store that Asher Hamburger and his sons Moses, David and Solomon had established in Los Angeles after their recent move from Sacramento. This store first opened on October 29, 1881, in a 20-by-75-foot room on Main Street near Requena Street and was original known as The People's Store featuring clearly printed "One Price" tags.

In 1882, only one year later, Hamburger's moved to the Ponet-Bumiller Block at 45 North Spring Street (post-1890 numbering: 145 North Spring), southwest corner of Temple, in a space of 46 by 100 feet. Later, it expanded into the north half of the ground floor of the newly built Phillips Block, northwest corner of Spring and Franklin, then in 1887 into the south half. In April 1899 it added the Ponet store 20 feet to the north of the Bumiller Block.

In 1899, Hamburger's renovated and took over the entire Phillips Block, all four floors plus the cellar. The space officially opened June 1, 1899, and the store claimed at that time to have 3.5 acres (150,000 sq ft; 14,000 m^{2}) of floor space and to be the largest retail store in the Western United States. Later Hamburger's added an additional 2,500 square feet (230 m^{2}) onto its back side on New High Street

== 20th-century history ==
By the start of the 20th century, A. Hamburger & Sons had outgrown its Spring Street location, which had 520 employees working on five floors. The Hamburger family decided to build a much larger store at the southeast corner of Broadway and Eighth, a location that was outside of then current retail district. Construction started in 1905, with a grand opening held in 1908. This location, which was also known as the Great White Store, was the largest department store building west of Chicago at the time and would eventually become the flagship location for the May Company California. At the time that the Great White Store was opened, the store could boast of having one of the first escalators on the West Coast, several restaurants, a drug store, grocery store, bakery, fruit store, meat market, U.S. post office, telegraph office, barber shop, a dentist, a chiropractor, a medical doctor, an auditorium, an electricity and steam power plant in the basement that was large enough to support a city of 50,000 inhabitants, a private volunteer 120 men fire brigade, 13 acres of retail space (482,475 sq.ft., larger than all the department, clothing and dry goods stores in the city), and 1200 employees. The Los Angeles Public Library was also located on the third floor from 1908 until it was forced to move to a larger location when it outgrew the Hamburger space by 1913. For a short time, Woodbury Business College briefly was also located on the fifth floor. Circa 1912, there was a temporary free public menagerie on the fourth floor of 50 animals including a cassowary, a sun bear, an orangutan, a 28 ft (8.5 m)-long python, monkeys and iridescent birds.

The store continued to expand until it took up the entire block bounded by Broadway, Hill, 8th and 9th. In 1923, a nine-story addition was built on Hill Street. With the addition of a new nine-story, 250,000 sq ft (23,000 m^{2}) building in 1930 it then measured over 1,000,000 sq ft (93,000 m^{2}) of floor space. In the mid-1920s May Company also built a warehouse at Grand and Jefferson and in 1927 a nine-story parking garage at 9th and Hill streets.

=== Acquisition by May ===
On March 31, 1923, the Hamburgers sold their store to the May family of St. Louis for $8.5 million (~$125 million in 2025). Thomas and Wilbur May, sons of the founder of the May Company, were sent to manage the former Hamburger store. One of the first things that they did was to expand the store again by building adjacent additions on the other parts of the city block. After several more years, the May Company store eventually occupied almost the entire block between Broadway and Hill and between 8th and 9th Streets. The old Hamburger store was officially renamed the May Company in 1925.

=== Expansion ===
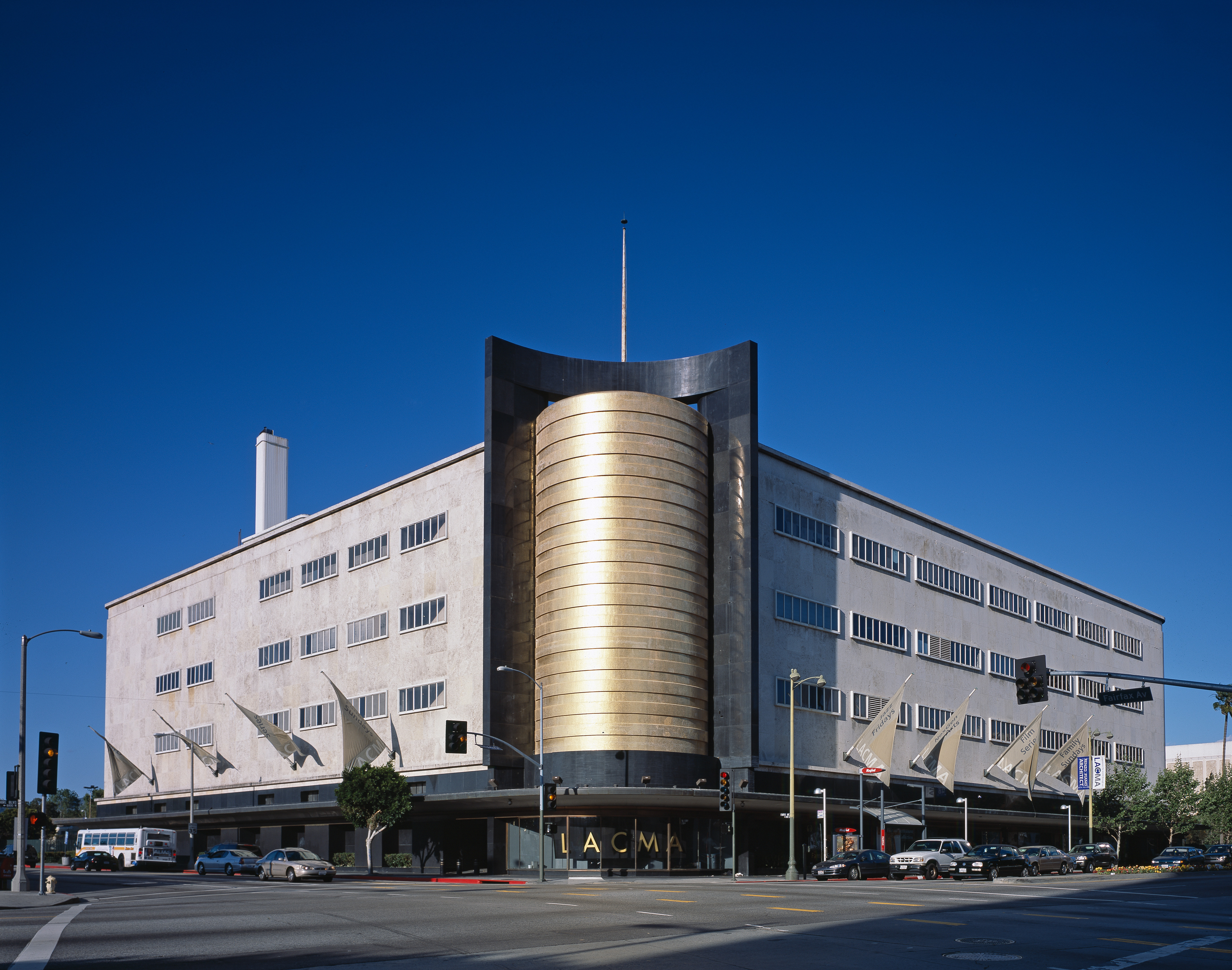
The 1939 Streamline Moderne style May Company Wilshire building, now The Academy Museum of Motion Pictures

To keep pace with the extreme growth in population within Southern California during the Great Depression, May Company opened the first branch store in 1939 on Wilshire at Fairfax at a cost of $2 million (~$36.3 million in 2025).

After World War II, a second branch store was opened on October 10, 1947 along Crenshaw Boulevard at the northeast corner of Santa Barbara St. (now M. L. King Jr. Blvd.). The store would later be integrated into the Broadway-anchored Crenshaw Plaza directly across the street to the south.

A proposed store in Hollywood that was planned at the same time was never built.

wordmark

From 1952 to 1992 May opened stores across suburban Los Angeles and Southern California (see table below). May Company-Lakewood opened at Lakewood Center on February 18, 1952, the four-level, 346,700-square-foot (32,210 m^{2}) May Company-Lakewood was the largest suburban department store in the world.

The North Hollywood store, opened in 1955 and originally marketed as part of the Valley Plaza shopping district, was a very large at 452,000 square feet (42,000 m^{2}), and claimed to be the second-largest suburban branch department store in the country, outsized only by a branch of Hudson's in suburban Detroit.

=== Conversion to Robinsons-May ===
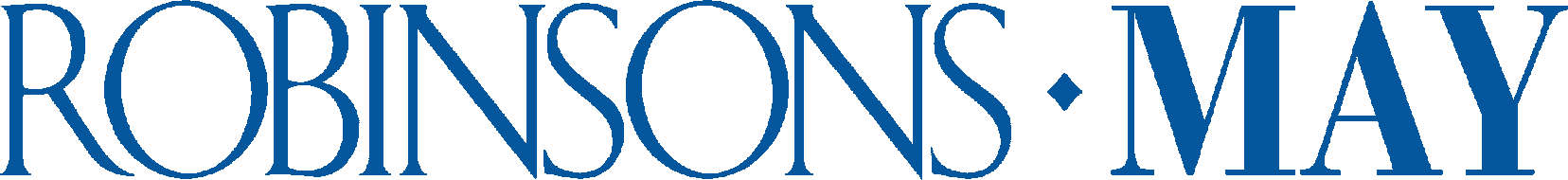
Robinson's-May Company merger logo

On October 17, 1992, May Company California's parent, May Department Stores, announced the merger of May Company California with its sister company J. W. Robinson's to form Robinsons-May, thus ending the May Company California existence. It was also announced that the Wilshire store along with the stores in West Covina, Buena Park, Santa Ana, and San Bernardino were scheduled to close by the end of January 1993.

== Logos ==
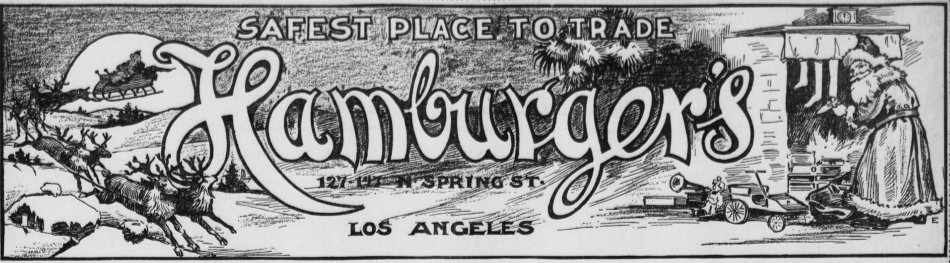
1881-1905

1905-1923

1923-1925

1939-1942

1942-1943

1943-1944

1944-1947

1944-1945

1946-1947

1947-1955

1955-1959

1959-1960

1960-1964

1964-1969

1969-1978

1978-1993

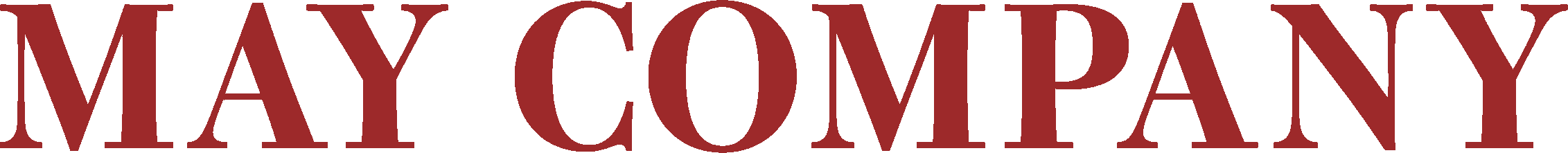
Final Logo

== Notable real estate ==
During the early part of this division existence, May Company was also the developer of some other early shopping centers and malls which grew around the initially stand-alone stores, with the Crenshaw location being the first example.

The first May Company store, the original Hamburger's, at Broadway and 8th in downtown Los Angeles was closed when it was replaced by the just opened 7th Market Place store in 1986. This building is designated as Los Angeles Historic-Cultural Monument No. 459. After its sale, the building was primary used by small clothing manufacturing companies. In 2013, the then current owners were trying to sell the building since the surrounding area is being actively redeveloped. It was announced in April 2014 that Waterbridge Capital agreed to purchase the property, but had not given out too many details on how they might go about to develop it, except to state it would be mixed-use.

During the 1980s, the parent corporation tried to replace the iconic Wilshire store for several years by getting involved with mall development at Farmers Market. However the development that eventually became The Grove at Farmers Market was delayed for nearly two decades. The St. Louis-based parent company eventually withdrew from the project and the Wilshire store was never replaced when May Company California was later merged with Robinson in 1993. After closing, the Streamline Moderne style building was sold to Los Angeles County Museum of Art in 1994 and currently houses The Academy Museum of Motion Pictures.

== List of stores ==
City	Suburban region	Mall or address	Opened	Closed	Notes
opened as Hamburger's
Victorian Downtown Los Angeles		Main Street near Requena	Oct 29, 1881	1882	20-by-75-foot room, 1,500 square feet (140 m^{2}). Known as The People's Store.
Victorian Downtown Los Angeles		Bumiller Block, Temple and Spring, northwest corner of Spring Street and Franklin Avenue	1882	1908	Originally a space of 46 by 100 ft. (4,600 square feet (430 m^{2})) in the Bumiller Block, northwest corner of North Spring Street and Franklin Avenue.; July 1888, expanded into the north half of the ground floor of the new Philips Block, adding 60x120 ft. (7200 sq. ft.) of selling space plus basement stockroom.; April 1899 added the Ponet store 20 ft to the north of the Bumiller Block; Renovated and on June 1, 1899, officially opened the entire 4-story Philips Block, 3.5 acres of floor space; Later added 2,500 sq. ft. onto back (New High St.) side
Broadway, Downtown L.A.		City block bounded by Broadway, Hill, Eighth and Ninth Streets	August 10, 1908	1986	482,475 sq. ft. at opening. Originally built as Hamburger's, who sold it to May Co. on March 31, 1923. Extensively expanded, with over 1,000,000 sq ft (93,000 m^{2}) of floor area by 1930. Now the Broadway Trade Center (mixed use). See May Company Building (Broadway, Los Angeles)
opened as May Company
Miracle Mile		Northeast corner Wilshire Boulevard & Fairfax Avenue	September 7, 1939	January 1993	200,000 square feet (19,000 m^{2}). Now houses the Academy Museum of Motion Pictures. See May Company Building (Wilshire, Los Angeles)
Crenshaw		Northwest corner Crenshaw and Martin Luther King Jr. Boulevards (the latter was formerly Santa Barbara Avenue).	October 1947		200,000 square feet (19,000 m^{2}). Opened as a freestanding store across the street from Broadway-Crenshaw Center. Integrated into Baldwin Hills Crenshaw Plaza mall in the late 1980s.
Lakewood	South Bay/Long Beach	Lakewood Center	Feb 18, 1952		Upon opening, the four-level, 346,700-square-foot (32,210 m^{2}) May Company-Lakewood was the largest suburban department store in the world. Drew business from Long Beach and competed with Downtown Long Beach shopping district anchored by Buffums.
North Hollywood	San Fernando Valley	Laurel Plaza	Sep 9, 1955		Originally planned a store in Hollywood, then Valley Plaza, in the end this free-standing store was built; featured men's, women's and children's apparel and accessories, Boy and Girl Scout uniforms, notions, jewelry, small and major appliances, silverware, toys, books, sporting goods and stationery departments. Services included a beauty salon, tearoom, snackbar, auditorium, and parking for 3,000 cars. A mall was added later on. At 452,500 square feet (42,040 m^{2}), largest suburban branch department store in the West. Turned into mixed retail use after Macy's closed in 2016. Architect Albert C. Martin Sr. & Assoc. Store manager at launch Norman Caldwell.
West Covina	San Gabriel Valley	Eastland Center	1957	January 1993	Now demolished for Target and Burlington Coat Factory since 1996
Redondo Beach	South Bay LA Co.	South Bay Galleria	1959		
Mission Valley	San Diego	Mission Valley Center	February 20, 1961		The May Company Building at Westfield Mission Valley is empty now but considered an architectural landmark
Buena Park	North Orange Co.	Buena Park Mall	August 19, 1963	January 1993	First became Fedco in 1993, now demolished for Walmart since 2003
Canoga Park	San Fernando Valley	Topanga Plaza Shopping Mall	February 1964		
Rancho Park	Westside LA Co.	Pico and Westwood Boulevards (later part of Westside Pavilion)	August 2, 1964		
Whittier	Southeast LA Co.	The Quad at Whittier	1964	March 31, 1987	Closed just six months before the Whittier Narrows earthquake which took place at 7:42 a.m. October 1, 1987. The store's three-level parking structure fell almost flat to the ground as a result of this quake, and the store itself suffered internal damage but remained intact until its controlled implosion (via dynamite) a few years later.
Costa Mesa	Orange Coast	Costa Mesa	February 21, 1966		
Arcadia	San Gabriel Valley	El Rancho Santa Anita Shopping Center	1966		Victor Gruen & Assoc., architects; Welton Becket & Assoc., Spanish colonial interiors. 240,000 sq. ft. Was a Vons supermarket, currently empty.
San Bernardino	Inland Empire	Inland Center	1966	January 1993	First became Gottschalks in 1995, now JCPenney since 2016, new Robinsons-May store built 5 years later in same mall (now Macy's)
Montclair	Inland Empire	Montclair Plaza	1968		
Carlsbad	North Co. San Diego	Plaza Camino Real	February 10, 1969		150,000 sq ft. Designed by Welton Becket & Associates.
Oxnard	Ventura Co.	Esplanade Mall	November 2, 1970		
El Cajon	East San Diego Co.	Parkway Plaza	1972		
Riverside	Inland Empire	Tyler Mall	August 1973		
Eagle Rock	Northeastern Los Angeles	Eagle Rock Plaza	October 1, 1973	Became Macy's in 2006, Macy's closed in September 2023.	
City of Orange	North Orange Co.	The City Shopping Center	1974	July 1991	Closed two months after the one at MainPlace Mall in Santa Ana, California opened
Westminster	Orange Coast	Westminster Mall	August 7, 1974		
Culver City	Westside LA Co.	Fox Hills Mall	1975		
Brea	North Orange Co.	Brea Mall	1977		
Thousand Oaks	Ventura Co.	The Oaks	1978		
Mission Viejo	South Orange Co.	Mission Viejo Mall	1979		
La Jolla	San Diego	La Jolla Village Square	October 4, 1979		
Sherman Oaks	San Fernando Valley	Sherman Oaks Galleria	1980		
Pasadena	San Gabriel Valley	Plaza Pasadena	August 1980	1989	
Bonita	South Bay, San Diego Co.	Plaza Bonita	1981		
Palos Verdes	South Bay LA Co.	Promenade on the Peninsula	1981		
Palm Desert	Coachella Valley	Westfield Palm Desert	October 6, 1982		
Montebello	Southeast L.A. Co.	Montebello Town Center	1985		
Escondido	North San Diego Co.	Escondido	February 20, 1986		
Downtown Los Angeles		Seventh Market Place	March 13, 1986		After a long period of declining sales, the original Downtown flagship store at 8th and Broadway was closed and replaced by this smaller store. The parent company had previously relocated the main corporate offices for the May Company California division from the former Hamburger Building to the North Hollywood store at Laurel Plaza in 1983. The store is now the site of Nordstrom Rack (level M1), Target (level M2), and H&M (level M3).
Bakersfield		Valley Plaza Mall	1988		
Las Vegas, Nevada		Fashion Show Mall	converted 1989		acquired from sister company Goldwater's in 1989 when parent company May Department Stores decided to cut costs by consolidating divisions. The Las Vegas store is one of two locations in which a pre-existing store was acquired from another organization instead of being built from scratch, the other being Orange, originally constructed as Walker-Scott Department Store.
Santa Maria	Santa Barbara County (North)	Santa Maria Town Center	1990		
Downey	SE LA Co.	Stonewood Center	1990		
Santa Ana	Central Orange Co.	MainPlace Mall	May 1991		
Santa Clarita	Santa Clarita Valley	Valencia Town Center	September 1992		
Moreno Valley	Inland Empire	Moreno Valley Mall	October 8, 1992		The last new store to open which was open for three months when the merger with J. W. Robinson's took place and became Robinsons-May.

== Gallery ==
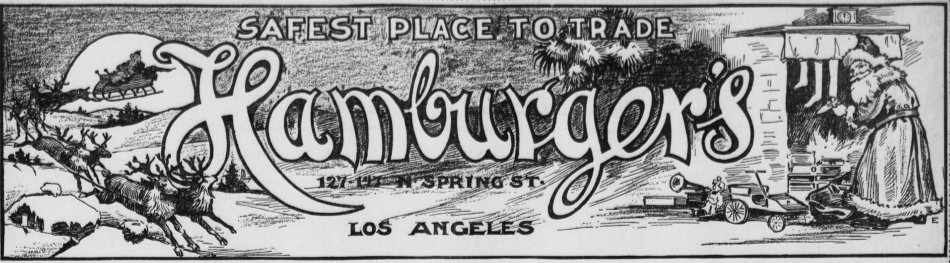
Christmas advertisement, 1905

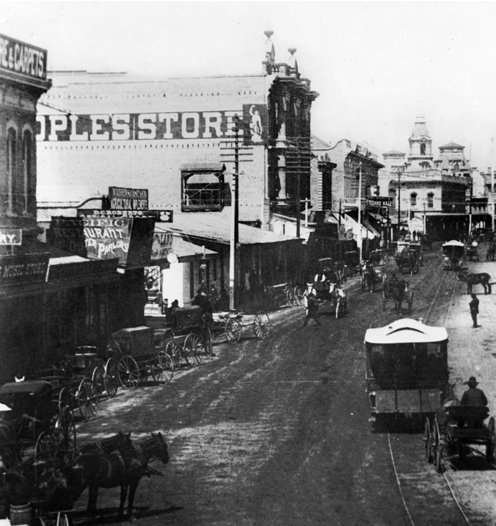
Hamburger's People's Store Spring Street 1880s

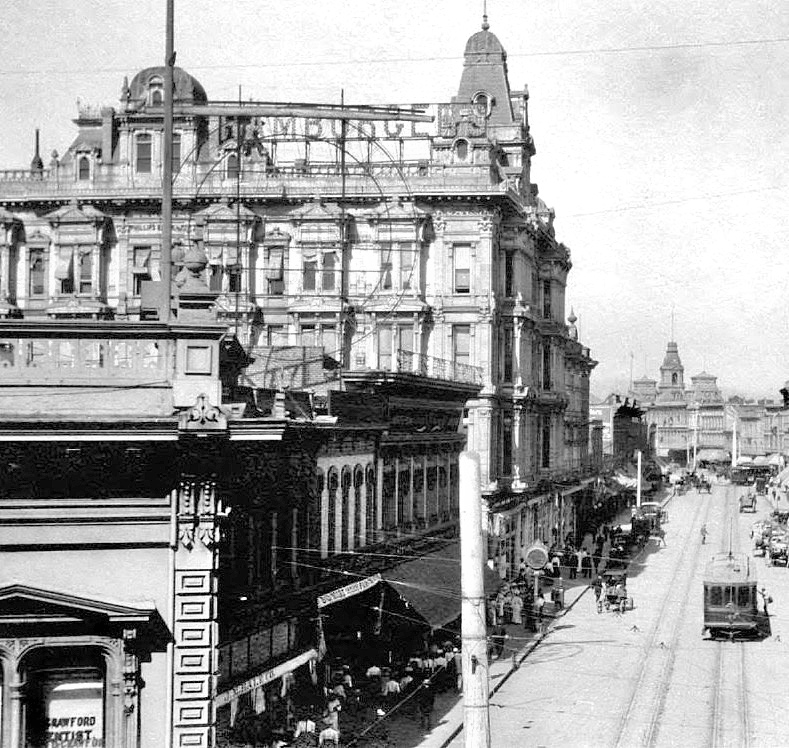
Hamburger's People's Store after construction of and expansion into the Philips Block, Spring Street ca. 1890s

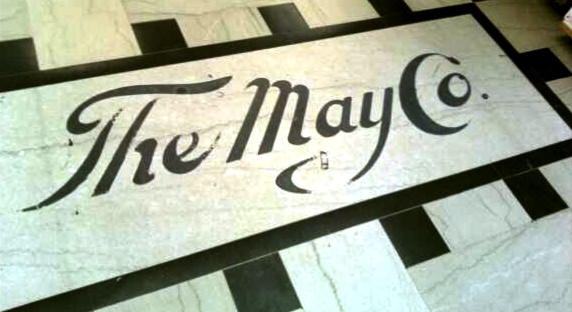
Terrazzo at the entrance of the Downtown Los Angeles flagship

== In pop culture ==
- On the Jack Benny radio and television programs, Benny was said to have met his girlfriend Mary Livingstone (played by his real-life wife, Sadie Marks) at the May Company when she worked there in the hosiery department. This is one of the few instances in radio or television history where a real business was made part of the story. (Jack and Mary Benny actually met through friends and not at a department store.)
- In Andre de Toth's 1948 film noir Pitfall, Lizabeth Scott's character, Mona Stevens, is depicted working in the fine dresses department of the May Company's Wilshire Boulevard location.

== See also ==
- May Company Building (Broadway, Los Angeles)
- May Company Building (Wilshire, Los Angeles)
- May Company Building (Mission Valley, San Diego)
- List of department stores converted to Macy's
