= Mershops Shops at Montebello =

- Location: Montebello, California
- Address: 2134 Montebello Town Center Dr, 90640
- Opened: December 1985; 40 years ago
- Previous names: Montebello Town Center (1985 - 2010); The Shops at Montebello (2010-2025)
- Developer: Donahue-Schriber
- Manager: Spinoso Real Estate Group
- Owner: Mershops
- Num. of stores: 120+
- Num. of anchor tenants: 3, (Macy's, Macy's Home, & JCPenney). 1 Coming Soon (Round 1 Expected to open 2026 - 27)
- Floor area: 758,504 square feet (70,467.3 m^{2})
- Floors: 2
- Website: https://www.shopsatmontebello.com/

Mershops Shops at Montebello is a shopping mall mainly located within the city limits of Montebello, California. The mall features 758,504 sq ft of leasable retail space. It is owned by Mershops and managed by Spinoso Real Estate Group. It features major department stores like Macy’s, JCPenney, Macy’s Home Store, and Round 1 (coming soon), as well as smaller shops like H&M, Victoria’s Secret, JD Sports, and Aéropostale, as well as a small food court.

== History ==
=== Construction and opening ===
Construction of the mall began in 1980 and was completed in 1985 by Donahue-Schriber. The mall opened for business for the 1985 holiday season and opened as Montebello Town Center. The mall's original anchors were JCPenney, Mervyn's and May Company California. May Company became Robinsons-May in 1993.

=== 2000s ===
The Robinsons-May store became a Macy's in 2006. Mervyn's went out of business in 2008 due to its Chapter 7 Bankruptcy. The store became a Forever 21 in 2009.

=== Renovations and 2010s ===
The remainder of the renovation was expected to be completed in June 2010 and includes a center court with more "high end" stores such as Coach fine leathers and Aldo fashion footwear. After the renovations, the malls name changed from to The Shops at Montebello to focus on its new image.

UBS Realty Investors purchased the mall in 2012, which it had acquired the mall from Macerich. Soon after, Simon Property Group was assigned to manage the mall.

The mall was again remodeled in 2016. The food court was renovated along with enhanced entryways, landscaping, signage, and outdoor seating. The anchor store H&M was also remodeled.

In January 2019, Pacific Retail announced ownership of the mall from Simon on its Instagram page.

=== 2020s ===
In May 2022, The Shops at Montebello was sold to Bridge Group Investments for more than $90 million. In August 2025, The Shops at Montebello was rebranded as Mershops Shops at Montebello, because of Bridge Group Investments rebrand as Mershops, which was a portfolio wide change across all of their properties.

In 2025, Forever 21 closed following its second Chapter 11 Bankruptcy. However, the former Forever 21 will be subdivided into four different spaces, a Yard House, potential retail space, and potential restaurant space on the lower floor, and a Round 1 on the upper floor along with a YUU Japanese Food Hall in the location, both Round 1 is supposed to have the opening date of October 2026 or March 2027, while Yard House will have an opening date with the rest of the mall expansion in Winter 2028. Construction on the space started on August 20th, 2026, being led by PR Construction Inc. and is supposed to open in Winter 2028.

== In popular culture ==
Some scenes in the 2002 comedy The Hot Chick was filmed in the mall. A Windsor store on the west end of the mall was filmed for the movie’s ‘shoplifting’ scene. The escalator scene also featured in the movie was filmed near the Robinson-May store in the mall too.

== See also ==
- Puente Hills Mall
- The Shops at Santa Anita
- Mershops Town Center at Aurora
- Meadowood Mall
