= Department store =

Retail establishment

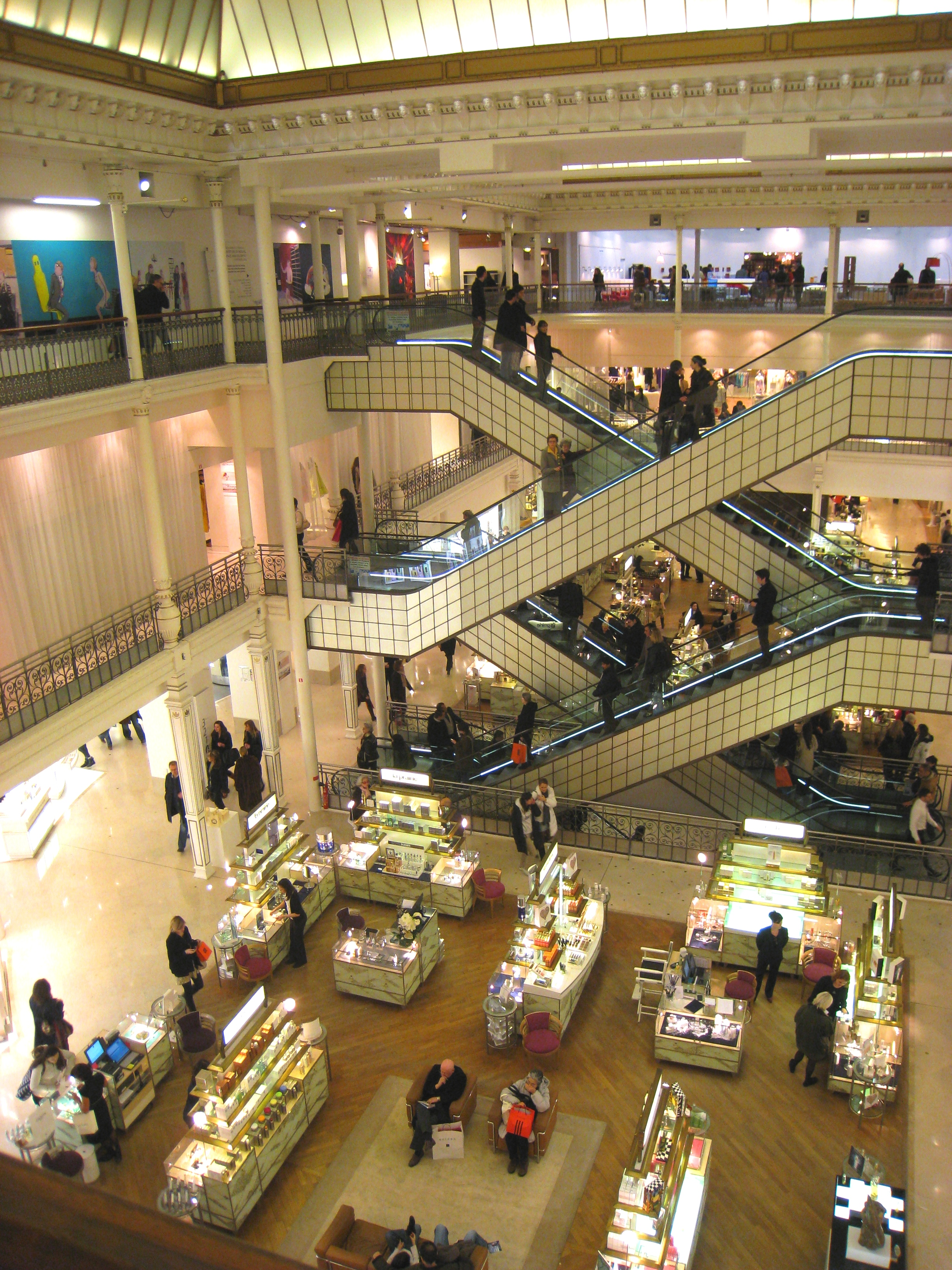
Interior of Le Bon Marché in Paris (2008)

A department store is a retail establishment offering a wide range of consumer goods in different areas of the store under one roof, each area ("department") specializing in a product category. In modern major cities, department stores emerged in the mid-19th century, reshaping shopping habits and the definition of service and luxury. Similar developments were under way in London (with Whiteleys), in Paris (Le Bon Marché) and in New York City (Stewart's).

Today, departments often include the following: clothing, cosmetics, do it yourself, furniture, gardening, hardware, home appliances, houseware, paint, sporting goods, toiletries, and toys. Additionally, other lines of products such as food, books, jewellery, electronics, stationery, photographic equipment, baby products, and products for pets are sometimes included. Customers generally check out near the front of the store in discount department stores, while high-end traditional department stores include sales counters within each department. Some stores are one of many within a larger retail chain, while others are independent retailers.

Since the 1980s, department stores have faced increasing competition from discount retailers, and later from e-commerce businesses in the 2000s.

== Types ==
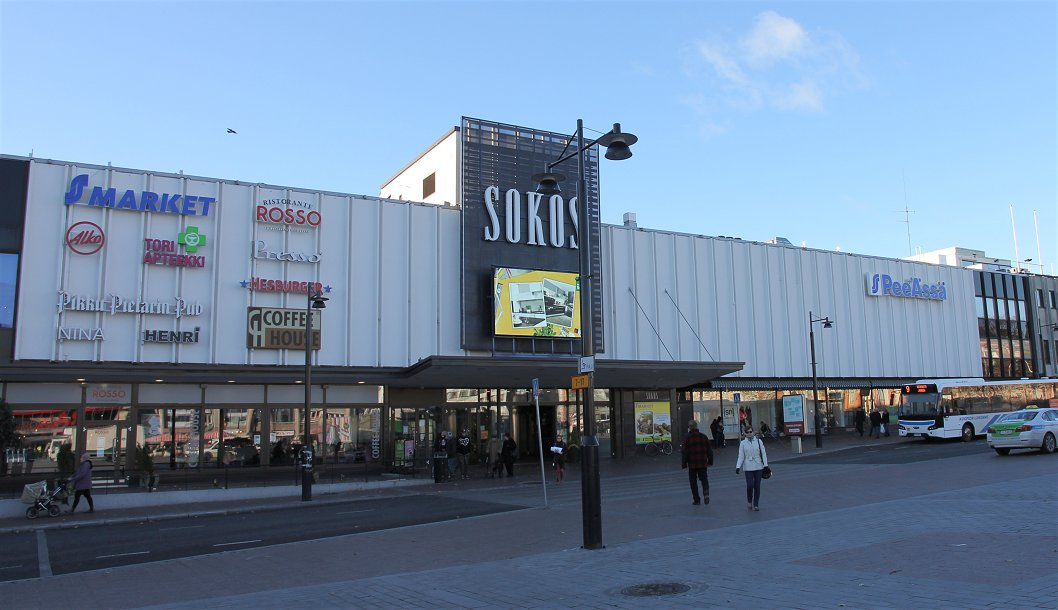
Sokos department store building in Multimäki, Kuopio, Finland

Department stores can be classified in several ways:

- Mainline department store or simply, the traditional department store, offering mid- to high-end goods, most or at least some of the time at the full retail price. Examples are Macy's, Bloomingdale's, Nordstrom, J.C. Penney, Montgomery Ward, Sears and Belk.
  - Junior department store, a term used principally in the second part of the 20th century for a smaller version of a mainline department store. These were usually either independent stores, or chains such as Boston Store and Harris & Frank, which specialized in cosmetics and wearing apparel and accessories, with few home goods.
- Discount department store, a large discount store selling apparel and home furnishings at a discount, either selling overstock from mainline department stores, or merchandise especially made for the discount department store market. Examples are Nordstrom Rack, Saks Off 5th, Marshalls, Ross Dress for Less, TJ Maxx, and Kohl's.

Some sources may refer to the following types of stores as department stores, even though they are not generally considered as such:

- Hypermarkets (discount superstores with full grocery offerings, such as Target, Walmart and Carrefour)
- Variety stores, also known in the U.S. as five and dimes, or dollar stores

== History ==
=== Origins in England, 1700s ===
One of the first department stores may have been Bennett's in Derby, first established as an ironmonger (hardware shop) in 1734. It continued trading in the same building until its administration and closure in 2019. However, the first reliably dated department store to be established, was Harding, Howell & Co., which opened in 1796 on Pall Mall, London. The oldest department store chain may be Debenhams, which was established in 1778 and closed in 2021. It is the longest trading defunct British retailer. An observer writing in Ackermann's Repository, a British periodical on contemporary taste and fashion, described the enterprise in 1809 as follows:

The house is one hundred and fifty feet in length from front to back, and of proportionate width. It is fitted up with great taste, and is divided by glazed partitions into four departments, for the various branches of the extensive business, which is there carried on. Immediately at the entrance is the first department, which is exclusively appropriated to the sale of furs and fans. The second contains articles of haberdashery of every description, silks, muslins, lace, gloves, &etc. In the third shop, on the right, you meet with a rich assortment of jewelry, ornamental articles in ormolu, French clocks, &etc.; and on the left, with all the different kinds of perfumery necessary for the toilette. The fourth is set apart for millinery and dresses; so that there is no article of female attire or decoration, but what may be here procured in the first style of elegance and fashion. This concern has been conducted for the last twelve years by the present proprietors who have spared neither trouble nor expense to ensure the establishment of a superiority over every other in Europe, and to render it perfectly unique in its kind.

This venture is described as having all of the basic characteristics of the department store; it was a public retail establishment offering a wide range of consumer goods in different departments. Jonathan Glancey for the BBC writes:

Harding, Howell & Co was focused on the needs and desires of fashionable women. Here, at last women were free to browse and shop, safely and decorously, away from home and from the company of men. These, for the main part, were newly affluent middle-class women, their good fortune – and the department store itself – nurtured and shaped by the Industrial Revolution. This was transforming life in London and the length and breadth of Britain at a dizzying pace on the back of energetic free trade, fecund invention, steam and sail, and a seemingly inexhaustible supply of expendable cheap labour.

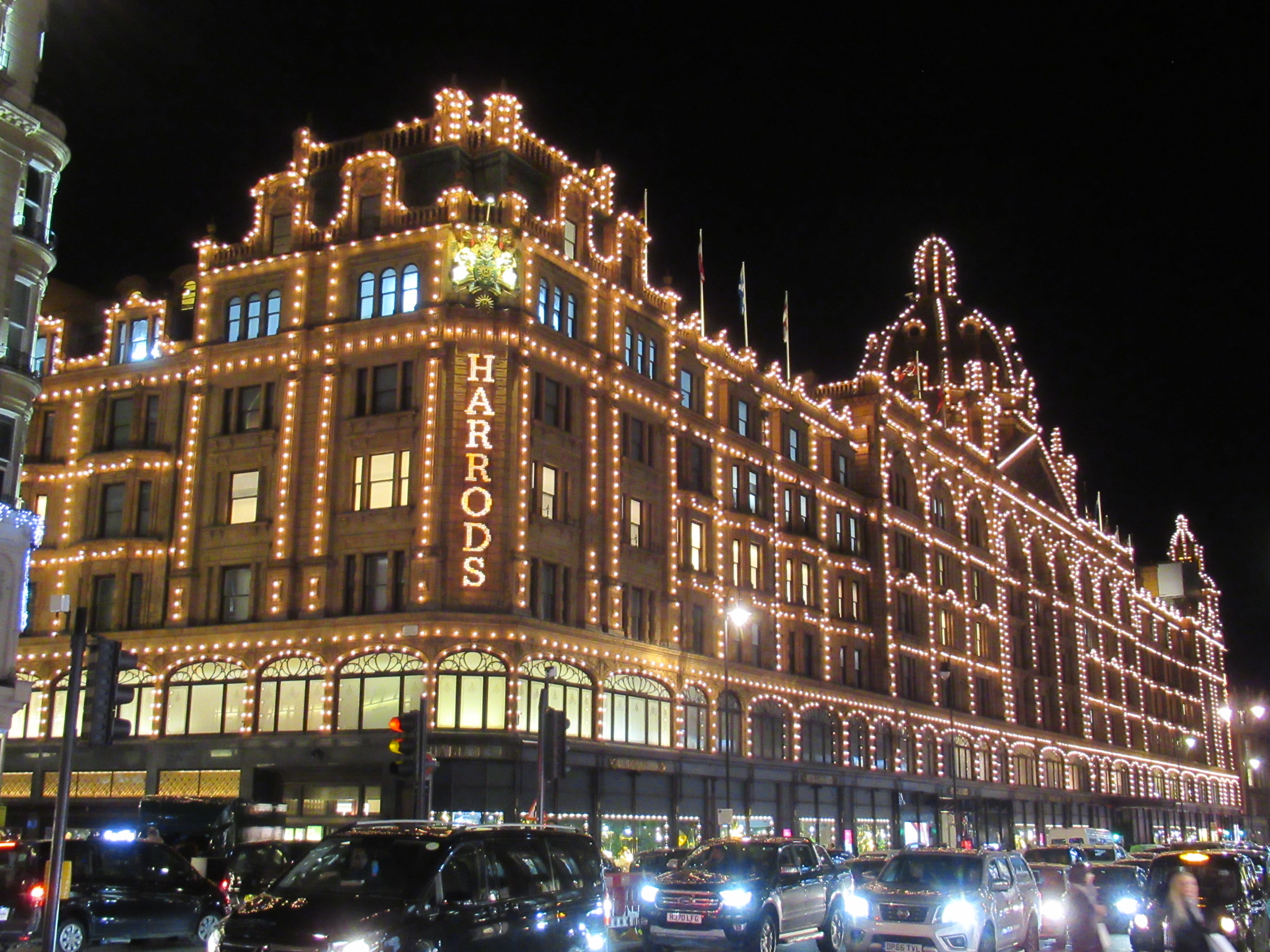
Harrods illuminated exterior at night in Knightsbridge, London

This pioneering shop was closed down in 1820 when the business partnership was dissolved. By the mid-to-late nineteenth century, most major High Streets in British cities featured flourishing department stores. Increasingly, women became the main customers. Kendals (formerly Kendal Milne & Faulkner) in Manchester lays claim to being one of the first department stores and is still known to many of its customers as Kendal's, despite its 2005 name change to House of Fraser. The Manchester institution dates back to 1836 but had been trading as Watts Bazaar since 1796. At its zenith the store had buildings on both sides of Deansgate linked by a subterranean passage "Kendals Arcade" and an art nouveau tiled food hall. The store was especially known for its emphasis on quality and style over low prices giving it the nickname "the Harrods of the North", although this was due in part to Harrods acquiring the store in 1919. Harrods of London can be traced back to 1834, though the current store was built between 1894 and 1905. Opened in 1830, Austins in Derry remained in operation as the world's oldest independent department store until its closure in 2016. Lewis's of Liverpool operated from 1856 to 2010. A concept devised by retail entrepreneur David Lewis, the world's first Christmas grotto opened in Lewis's in 1879, entitled 'Christmas Fairyland'. Liberty & Co. in London's West End gained popularity in the 1870s for selling Oriental goods. In 1889, Oscar Wilde wrote "Liberty's is the chosen resort of the artistic shopper".

=== Origins in Parisian magasins de nouveautés ===
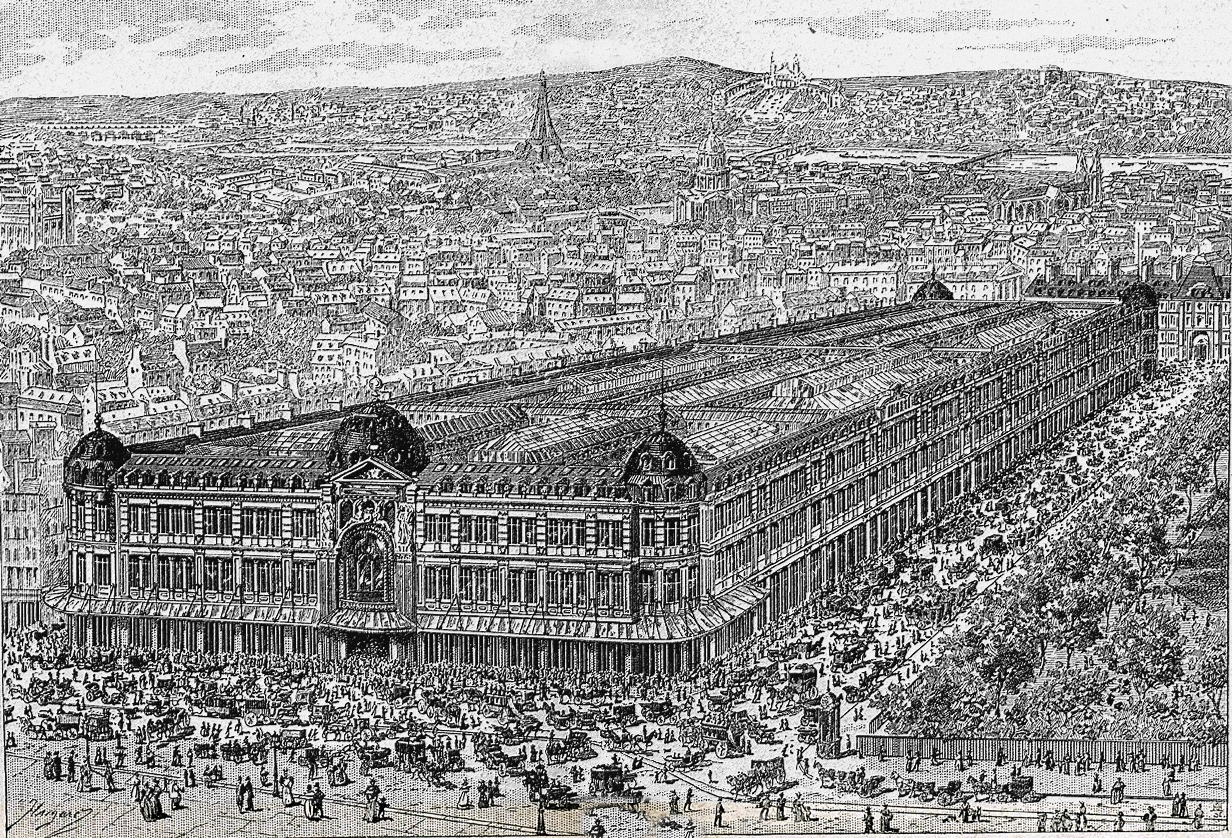
Au Bon Marché

The Paris department stores have roots in the magasin de nouveautés, or novelty stores; the first, the Tapis Rouge, was created in 1784. They flourished in the early 19th century. Balzac described their functioning in his novel César Birotteau. In the 1840s, with the arrival of the railroads in Paris and the increased number of shoppers they brought, they grew, and began to have large plate glass display windows, fixed prices and price tags, and advertising in newspapers.

A novelty shop called Au Bon Marché was founded in Paris in 1838 to sell items like lace, ribbons, sheets, mattresses, buttons, and umbrellas. It grew from 300 m^{2} (3,200 ft^{2}) and 12 employees in 1838 to 50,000 m^{2} (540,000 ft^{2}) and 1,788 employees in 1879. Boucicaut was renowned for his marketing innovations; a reading room for husbands while their wives shopped; extensive newspaper advertising; entertainment for children; and six million catalogues sent out to customers. By 1880 half the employees were women; unmarried women employees lived in dormitories on the upper floors.

Au Bon Marché soon had Printemps, founded in 1865; La Samaritaine (1869), Bazar de Hotel de Ville (BHV); and Galeries Lafayette (1895) as competitors. The French gloried the national prestige brought by the Parisian stores. Émile Zola (1840–1902) set his novel Au Bonheur des Dames (1882–83) in the typical department store, making it a symbol of the new technology that was improving society and devouring it.

=== First Australian department stores ===
Australia is notable for having the longest continuously operating department store, David Jones. The first David Jones department store was opened on 24 May 1838, by Welsh born immigrant David Jones in a "large and commodious premises" on the corner of George and Barrack Streets in Sydney, only 50 years after the foundation of the colony. Expanding to a number of stores in the various states of Australia, David Jones is the oldest continuously operating department franchise in the world. Other department stores in Australia include Grace Bros founded in 1885, now merged with Myer which was founded in 1900.

=== First American department stores (1825–1858) ===
Arnold Constable was the first American department store. It was founded in 1825 as a small dry goods store on Pine Street in New York City. In 1857 the store moved into a five-story white marble dry goods palace known as the Marble House. During the Civil War, Arnold Constable was one of the first stores to issue charge bills of credit to its customers each month instead of on a bi-annual basis. The store soon outgrew the Marble House and erected a cast-iron building on Broadway and Nineteenth Street in 1869; this "Palace of Trade" expanded over the years until it was necessary to move into a larger space in 1914. Financial problems led to bankruptcy in 1975.

In New York City in 1846, Alexander Turney Stewart established the "Marble Palace" on Broadway, between Chambers and Reade streets. He offered European retail merchandise at fixed prices on a variety of dry goods, and advertised a policy of providing "free entrance" to all potential customers. Though it was clad in white marble to look like a Renaissance palazzo, the building's cast iron construction permitted large plate glass windows that permitted major seasonal displays, especially in the Christmas shopping season. In 1862, Stewart built a new store on a full city block uptown between 9th and 10th streets, with eight floors. His innovations included buying from manufacturers for cash and in large quantities, keeping his markup small and prices low, truthful presentation of merchandise, the one-price policy (so there was no haggling), simple merchandise returns and cash refund policy, selling for cash and not credit, buyers who searched worldwide for quality merchandise, departmentalization, vertical and horizontal integration, volume sales, and free services for customers such as waiting rooms and free delivery of purchases. In 1858, Rowland Hussey Macy founded Macy's as a dry goods store.

=== Innovations 1850–1917 ===
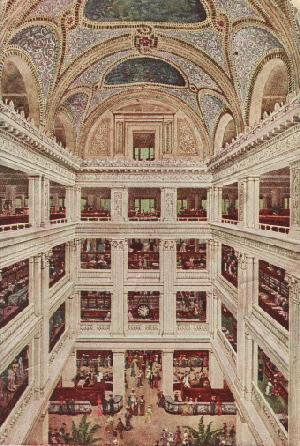
Marshall Field's State Street store "great hall" interior around 1910

Marshall Field & Company originated in 1852. It was the premier department store on the busiest shopping street in the Midwest at the time, State Street in Chicago. Marshall Field's was often cited as a model for other department stores in that it had exceptional customer service. Marshall Field's also had the firsts; among many innovations by Marshall Field's were the first European buying office, which was located in Manchester, England, and the first bridal registry. The company was the first to introduce the concept of the personal shopper, and that service was provided without charge in every Field's store, until the chain's last days under the Marshall Field's name. It was the first store to offer revolving credit and the first department store to use escalators. Marshall Field's book department in the State Street store was legendary; it pioneered the concept of the "book signing". Moreover, every year at Christmas, Marshall Field's downtown store windows were filled with animated displays as part of the downtown shopping district display; the "theme" window displays became famous for their ingenuity and beauty, and visiting the Marshall Field's windows at Christmas became a tradition for Chicagoans and visitors alike, as popular a local practice as visiting the Walnut Room with its equally famous Christmas tree or meeting "under the clock" on State Street.

In 1877, John Wanamaker opened what some claim was the United States' first "modern" department store in Philadelphia: the first to offer fixed prices marked on every article and also introduced electrical illumination (1878), the telephone (1879), and the use of pneumatic tubes to transport cash and documents (1880) to the department store business.

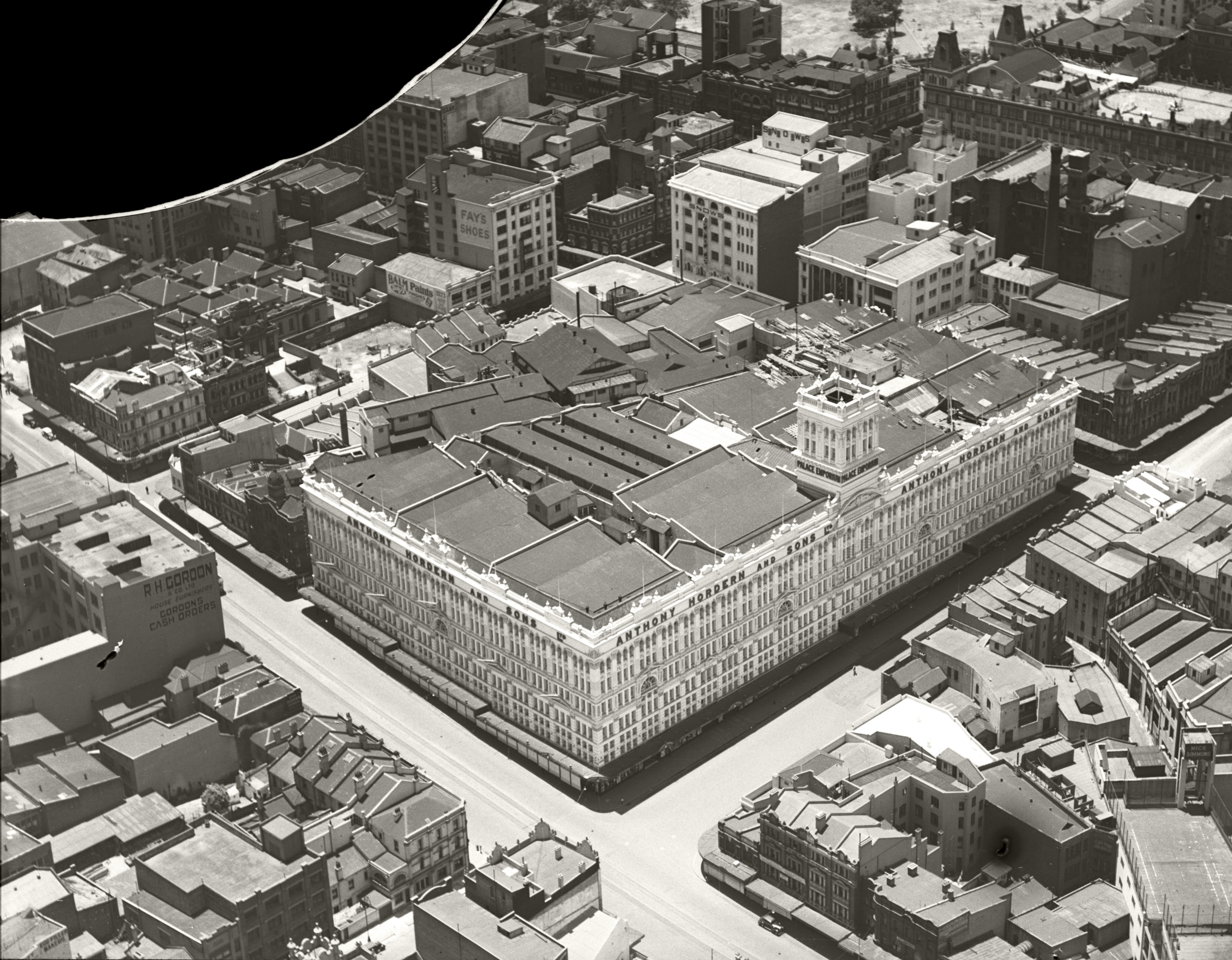
Aerial view of Anthony Hordern & Sons in Sydney, Australia (1936), once the largest department store in the world

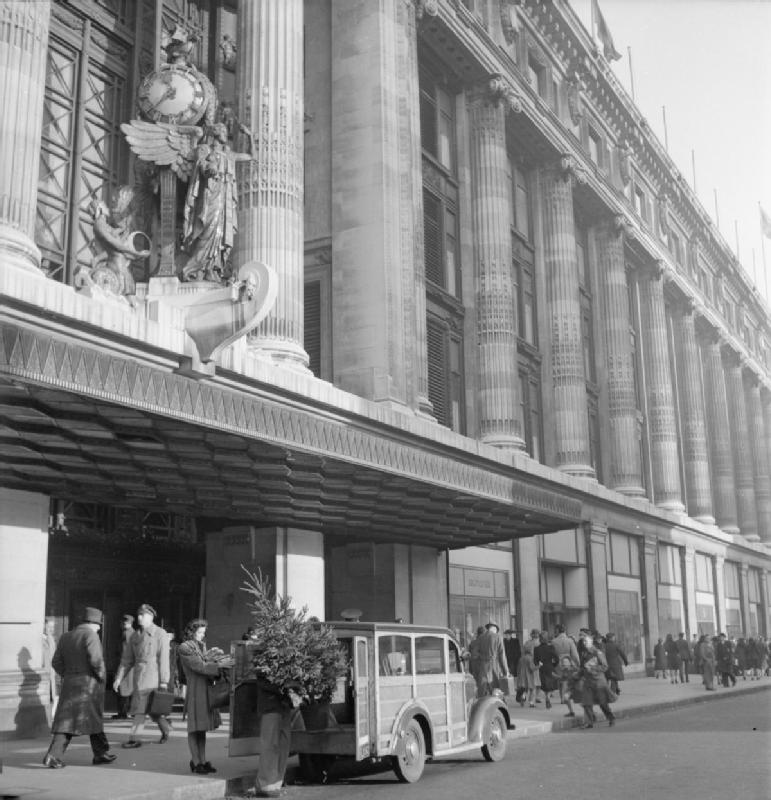
Selfridges in Oxford Street, London in wartime Britain (December 1944)

Another store to revolutionize the concept of the department store was Selfridges in London, established in 1909 by American-born Harry Gordon Selfridge on Oxford Street. The company's marketing promoted the notion of shopping for pleasure rather than necessity, a concept later adopted by department stores worldwide. Dramatic window displays encouraged "just looking". The store was extensively promoted through paid advertising. The shop floors were structured so that goods could be made more accessible to customers. There were elegant restaurants with modest prices, a library, reading and writing rooms, special reception rooms for French, German, American and "Colonial" customers, a First Aid Room, and a Silence Room, with soft lights, deep chairs, and double-glazing, all intended to keep customers in the store as long as possible. Staff members were taught to be on hand to assist customers, but not too aggressively, and to sell the merchandise. Selfridge attracted shoppers with educational and scientific exhibits; in 1909, Louis Blériot's monoplane was exhibited at Selfridges (Blériot was the first to fly over the English Channel), and the first public demonstration of television by John Logie Baird took place in the department store in 1925.

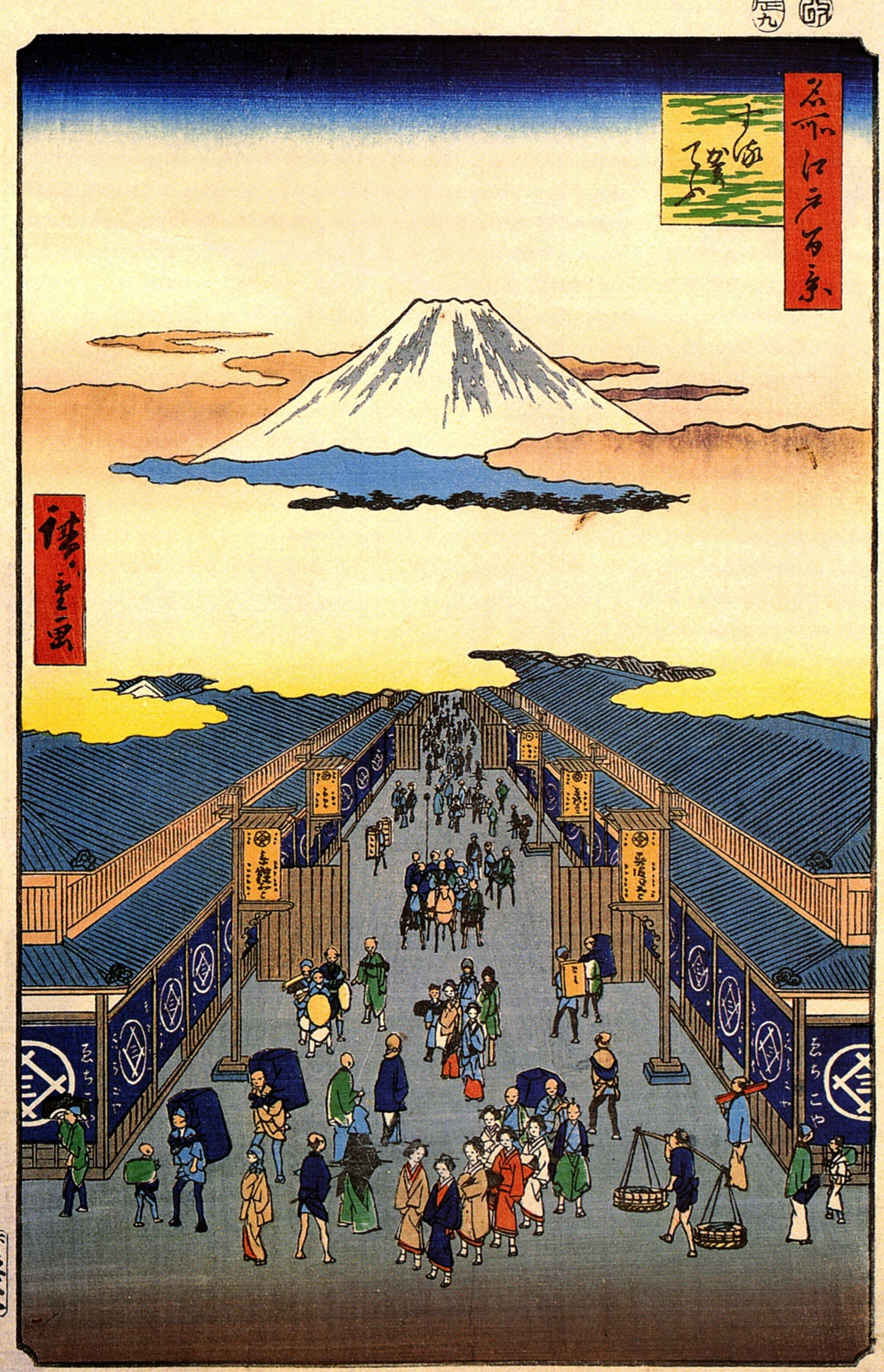
Utagawa Hiroshige designed an ukiyo-e print with Mount Fuji and Echigoya as landmarks. Echigoya is the former name of Mitsukoshi named after the former province of Echigo. The Mitsukoshi headquarters are located on the left side of the street.

In Japan, the first "modern-style" department store was Mitsukoshi, founded in 1904, which has its root as a kimono store called Echigoya from 1673. When the roots are considered, however, Matsuzakaya has an even longer history, dated from 1611. The kimono store changed to a department store in 1910. In 1924, Matsuzakaya store in Ginza allowed street shoes to be worn indoors, something innovative at the time. These former kimono shop department stores dominated the market in its earlier history. They sold, or instead displayed, luxurious products, which contributed to their sophisticated atmospheres. Another origin of the Japanese department store is from railway companies. There have been many private railway operators in the nation and, from the 1920s, they started to build department stores directly linked to their lines' termini. Seibu and Hankyu are typical examples of this type.

=== Innovation (1917–1945) ===
In the middle of the 1920s, American management theories such as the scientific management of F.W. Taylor started spreading in Europe. The International Management Institute (I.M.I.) was established in Geneva in 1927 to facilitate the diffusion of such ideas. A number of department stores teamed up together to create the International Association of Department Stores in Paris in 1928 to have a discussion space dedicated to this retail format.

Table of department store "firsts"
Year	Store	City/ Metro area	"First"	Source
1923	I. Magnin Hollywood	Los Angeles	First suburban department store (not including hotel/resort stores)	
1930	Suburban Square	Philadelphia	First department store branch to anchor a suburban shopping center	

=== Expansion to malls ===
The U.S. Baby Boom led to the development of suburban neighborhoods and suburban commercial developments, including shopping malls. Department stores joined these ventures following the growing market of baby boomer spending.

A handful of U.S. retailers had opened seasonal stores in resorts, as well as smaller branch stores in suburbs, in the 1920s and 1930s. Examples include, in suburban Los Angeles, The Broadway-Hollywood, Bullocks Wilshire, The May Company-Wilshire, Saks-Beverly Hills, as well as two Strawbridge and Clothier stores: Suburban Square (1930) and Jenkintown (1931) outside Philadelphia. Suburban Square was the first shopping center anchored by a department store. In the 1950s, suburban growth took off – for example, in 1952, May Company California opened a four-level, 346,700-square-foot (32,210 m^{2}) store in Lakewood Center near Los Angeles, at the time, the largest suburban department store in the world. However, only three years later it would build an even bigger, 452,000-square-foot (42,000 m^{2}) store in the San Fernando Valley at Laurel Plaza.

=== 2010–today ===
Starting in 2010 many analysts referred to a retail apocalypse in the United States and some other markets, referring to the closing of brick-and-mortar retail stores, especially those of large chains. In 2017, over 12,000 U.S. stores closed due to over-expansion of malls, rising rents, bankruptcies, leveraged buyouts, low quarterly profits other than during holiday peak periods, delayed effects of the Great Recession of 2008-9, shifts in spending to experiences rather than material goods, relaxed dress codes in workplaces, and the shift to e-commerce in which Amazon.com and Walmart dominated versus the online offerings of traditional retailers.

COVID-19 increased the number of permanent store closings in two ways: first through mandatory temporary closing of stores, especially in March and April 2020, with customers largely staying away from stores for non-essential purchases for many more months after that; and secondly, by causing a shift to working from home, which stimulated e-commerce further and reduced demand for business apparel.

=== Click-and-collect, curbside pickup ===
Click-and-collect services at department stores had been increasing during the 2010s, with many creating larger, distinctly signed, designated areas. Some of the more elaborate ones included features such as reception and seating areas with coffee served, computers with large screens for online shopping, and dressing rooms.

With the onset of COVID-19 in 2020, most U.S. retailers offered a curbside pickup service as an option on their websites, and a dedicated area at one of the store entrances accessible by car.

=== Store-within-a-store ===
Along with discount stores, mainline department stores implemented more and more "stores-within-a-store". For luxury brands this was often in boutiques similar to the brands' own shops on streets and in malls; they hired their own employees who merchandised the selling space, and rang up the transactions at the brand's own cash registers. The main difference was that the boutique was physically inside the department store building, although in many cases there are walls or windows between the main store space and the boutique, with designated entrances.

== Largest flagship stores ==
=== Table of largest department store flagship or branch stores by sales area ===
Incomplete list, notable stores of 50,000 m^{2} (538,196 sq ft) or more. Individual department store buildings or complexes of buildings. Does not include shopping centers (e.g. GUM in Moscow and Intime "Department Stores" in China) where most space is leased out to other retailers, big-box category killer stores (e.g. Best Buy, Decathlon), hypermarkets, discount stores (e.g. Walmart, Carrefour), markets, or souqs.

closed	open

Company	Branch	City	Country	Sq m	Sq ft	Opened**	Closed
Shinsegae	Centum City	Busan	S. Korea	293,905	3,163,567	Jun 26, 2009	open
Largest in the world according to Guinness
Macy's	Herald Square (see article)	New York	U.S.	232,258	2,500,000	1902	open
Largest in the Americas
Anthony Hordern & Sons		Sydney	Australia	210,437	2,265,120	1823	1973
Gimbels	Center City	Philadelphia	U.S.	202,343	2,178,000	1894	1993
Upon opening its 12-story addition at 9th & Chestnut in 1927, it was, at 50 acres, the largest department store in the world.
Hudson's	Downtown Detroit	Detroit	U.S.	197,355 (1983)	2,124,316 (1983)	1891	Jan 17, 1983
25 floors, 2 half-floors, 1 mezzanine, 4 basements. 410 ft (125 m) high, tallest department store in the world at the time.
Marshall Field's, now Macy's	State Street store (see article)	Chicago	U.S.	185,806 (1912)	2,000,000 (1912)	1902	open
Largest in the world in 1912
Wanamaker's, now Macy's	1300 Market St., Center City	Philadelphia	U.S.	176,516 (1995)	1,900,000 (1995)	1876	March 23, 2025
Shinsegae	Uijeongbu (의정부점)	Uijeongbu	S. Korea	145,000	1,560,000		open
As of 2020, retail space has been reduced to 435,000 sq ft (40,413 m^{2}).
Rich's	Downtown	Atlanta	U.S.	115,886	1,247,382	1924	1994
Kaufmann's	400 5th Ave., Downtown	Pittsburgh	U.S.	111,484	1,200,000	1887	Sep 20, 2015
from 2005 to 2015 operated as Macy's
Wertheim	Leipziger Straße	Berlin	Germany	106,000	1,140,975	Dec 1897	Nov 1943
May Co.	Public Square−	Cleveland	U.S.	104,144	1,121,000	1915	1993
Hankyu	Umeda (see article in Japanese)	Osaka	Japan	102,758	1,106,078	Apr 15, 1929	open
Includes Main Store and adjacent Men's Store (16,000,^{2}) - by which measure, the largest department store complex in Japan. Japan's first railway station department store. Original store opened 1929, was dismantled and new store opened (part of it on the old site) in 2005.
Le Bon Marché	7th arrondissement	Paris	France	102,360	1,101,794	Apr 2, 1872	open
Largest in Europe
Hamburger's/ May Company	Broadway, Downtown (see article)	Los Angeles	U.S.	102,193	1,100,000	1906	1986
Harrods	Knightsbridge	London	U.K.	102,193	1,100,000	1849	open
Largest in Europe
Kintetsu	Abeno Harukas (see article in Japanese)	Osaka	Japan	100,000	1,076,391	Mar 2014	open
Largest in Japan in a single building
Intime	Ningbo General	Ningbo	China	96,000	1,003,335		open
Gimbels	Herald Square	New York	U.S.	92,903	1,000,000	Sep 29, 1910	Sep 27, 1986
Shinsegae	Daejeon (대전신세계) Shinsegae Art & Science	Daejeon	S. Korea	88,572 dept. store area	953,380	2021	open
Carson Pirie Scott	State Street	Chicago	U.S.	87,695	943,944	1872/1898	Feb 21, 2007
Mandel Bros./ Wieboldt's	State Street	Chicago	U.S.	81,848	881,000	1875	Jul 18, 1987
Takashimaya	Minami (Namba-Shinsaibashi)	Osaka	Japan	78,000	839,585		open
Daimaru	Shinsaibashi (see article in Japanese)	Osaka	Japan	77,000	828,821	1922	open
Eaton's/ Sears Canada	Eaton Centre	Toronto	Canada	76,809	816,000	Feb 10, 1977	Feb 9, 2014
9-story Eaton's flagship. Converted to Sears 2002, closed 2014. Space divided, converted to Nordstrom (2016-2023), Simons, Eataly and Nike (2025–present) and offices.
Bullock's	Broadway, Downtown	Los Angeles	U.S.	75,809	806,000	1907	1983
The Bon Marché	Downtown see article	Seattle	U.S.	74,322	800,000	1929	2020
Karstadt now Galeria	Hermannplatz (see article in German)	Berlin	Germany	72,000	775,002	1929	open
"The most advanced in Europe" in 1929; 9 stories incl. 2 underground; 8 freight elevators, 13 dumbwaiters, 24 passenger elevators. One freight elevator transported loaded trucks to the 5th floor food area. First in Europe with direct access from a subway station. Destroyed by bombing and fire in 1945 except for a small portion, which reopened in June 1945 and was later expanded.
The Emporium	Market Street	San Francisco	U.S.	72,000	775,000	1908	1996
El Corte Inglés	Torre Titania, Paseo de la Castellana, Castellana	Madrid	Spain	70,000	753,474	2011	open
Galeries Lafayette	Boulevard Haussmann	Paris	France	70,000	753,474	1912	open
Lazarus	141 S. High St. (see article)	Columbus, Ohio	U.S.	65,000	700,000	1909	2004
Isetan	Shinjuku (see article in Japanese)	Tokyo	Japan	64,296	692,080	Sep 28, 1933	open
Daimaru	Umeda (see article in Japanese)	Osaka	Japan	64,000	688,890		open
El Palacio de Hierro/ Casa Palacio	Centro Santa Fe	Santa Fe, Mexico City	Mexico	61,987	667,223	1993	open
Saks Fifth Avenue	Midtown (see article)	New York	U.S.	60,387	650,000	1924	open
KaDeWe	Tauentzienstraße	Berlin	Germany	60,000	645,835	Mar 27, 1907	open
J. W. Robinson's	7th St. Downtown	Los Angeles	U.S.	57,940	623,700	Sep 7, 1915	Feb 1993
Shinsegae	Myeongdong Main Store (본점 본관, 신관)	Seoul	S. Korea	56,528	608,460		open
Halle's	Halle Building, 1228 Euclid Ave., Downtown	Cleveland, Ohio	U.S.	56,300	606,000	1910	1982
Selfridges	Oxford Street	London	U.K.	55,742	600,000	Mar 15, 1909	open
El Palacio de Hierro	Polanco	Mexico City	Mexico	55,200	594,168	2016	open
Largest in Latin America
The Broadway	Broadway, Downtown	Los Angeles	U.S.	53,600	577,000	Feb 24, 1896	Nov 16, 1973
Hanshin	Umeda (see article in Japanese)	Osaka	Japan	54,000	581,251		open
Isetan	JR West Ōsaka Station (see article in Japanese)	Osaka	Japan	50,000	538,196	May 4, 2011	Jul 28, 2014
Store name: JR Osaka Mitsukoshi Isetan.^{ja} Was operated by a joint venture between Isetan Mitsukoshi Holdings and West Japan Railway Company. 28 July 2014 all floors except grocery and restaurant areas closed.

*store has no branches **opened at this location (may have expanded significantly in the years after initial opening)

== See also ==
- Department stores around the world
- List of department stores by country
- Distribution, Retail, Marketing
- Public department store
- History of retailing in the modern era
- Types of retail outlets
- International Association of Department Stores
- Retail apocalypse
