= Harding, Howell & Co. =

Former department store in London

Coordinates: 51.50613°N 0.13485°W

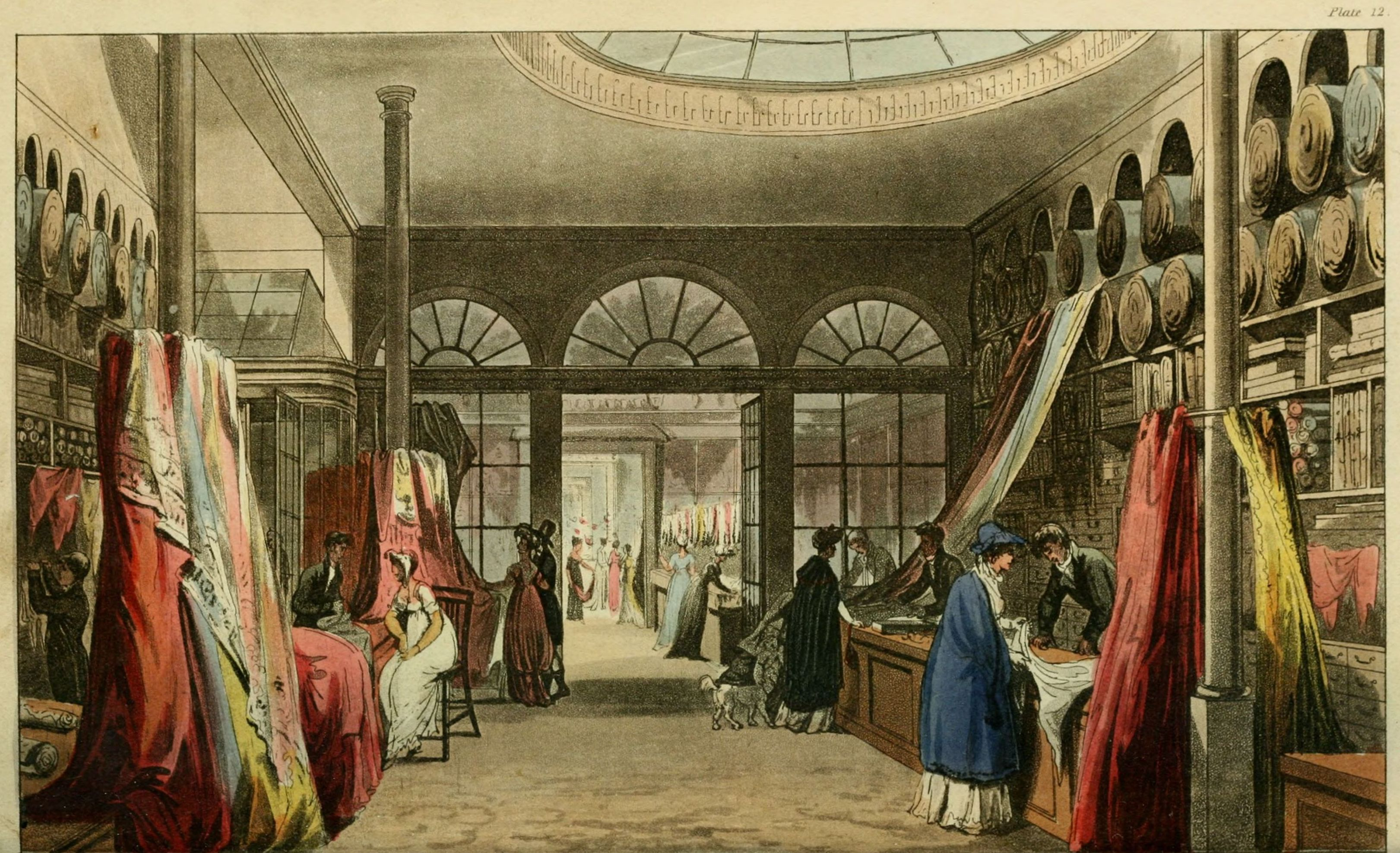
Harding, Howell & Co., a contender for the title of first department store in the world

Harding Howell and Company's Grand Fashionable Magazine was an 18th-century department store at 89 Pall Mall in St James's, London. Open from 1796 to 1820, it could be considered a forerunner of the modern department store.

The shop was divided into four departments, selling fur and fans, fabric for dresses, haberdashery, jewellery and clocks, perfume and millinery.
