= Saban Building =

Los Angeles Historic-Cultural Monument

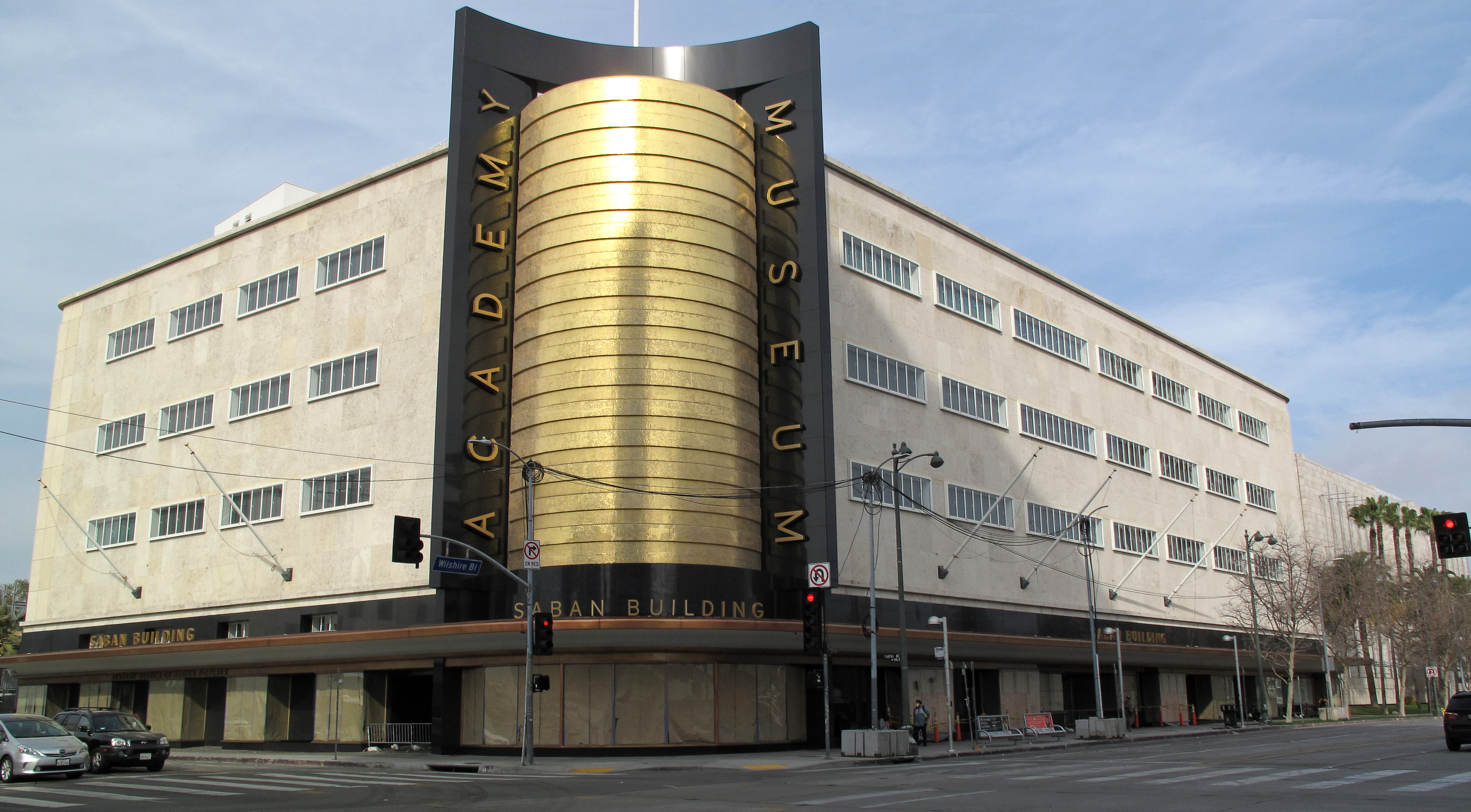
- The Academy Museum of Motion Pictures' Saban Building in 2021
- Former names: May Company Wilshire Building; LACMA West

General information
- Status: Completed
- Architectural style: Streamline Moderne
- Location: 6067 Wilshire Blvd., Los Angeles, CA 90036, U.S.
- Coordinates: 34.0633°N 118.3610°W
- Named for: Cheryl and Haim Saban
- Construction started: 1938
- Opened: 1939; 87 years ago
- Renovated: 2021
- Renovation cost: $368 million
- Owner: Academy Museum of Motion Pictures

Technical details
- Material: Concrete and steel
- Floor count: 6

Design and construction
- Architect: Albert C. Martin, Sr.

Renovating team
- Architect: Renzo Piano

Other information
- Public transit: 20 780 Wilshire/Fairfax (2026)

Website
- academymuseum.org
- Location in Western Los Angeles

History
- Built: 1939
- Built for: May Company
- Original use: Department store
- Rebuilt: 2020 (expected)

Site notes
- Architect: Albert C. Martin, Sr.
- Architectural style: Streamline Moderne

Los Angeles Historic-Cultural Monument
- Designated: September 30, 1992
- Reference no.: 566

The Saban Building, formerly the May Company Building, on Wilshire Boulevard in the Miracle Mile district of Los Angeles, is a celebrated example of Streamline Moderne architecture. The building's architect Albert C. Martin, Sr., also designed the Million Dollar Theater and Los Angeles City Hall. The May Company Building is a Los Angeles Historic-Cultural Monument. The building was operated as a May Company department store from 1939 until the store's closure in 1992, when May merged with J. W. Robinson's to form Robinsons-May. The building has been the home of the Academy Museum of Motion Pictures since 2021.

The Los Angeles Conservancy calls it "the grandest example of Streamline Moderne remaining in Los Angeles". It is especially noted for its gold-tiled cylindrical section that faces the intersection of Wilshire Boulevard at Fairfax Avenue, of which it occupies the northeast corner.

== History ==
=== May Company ===
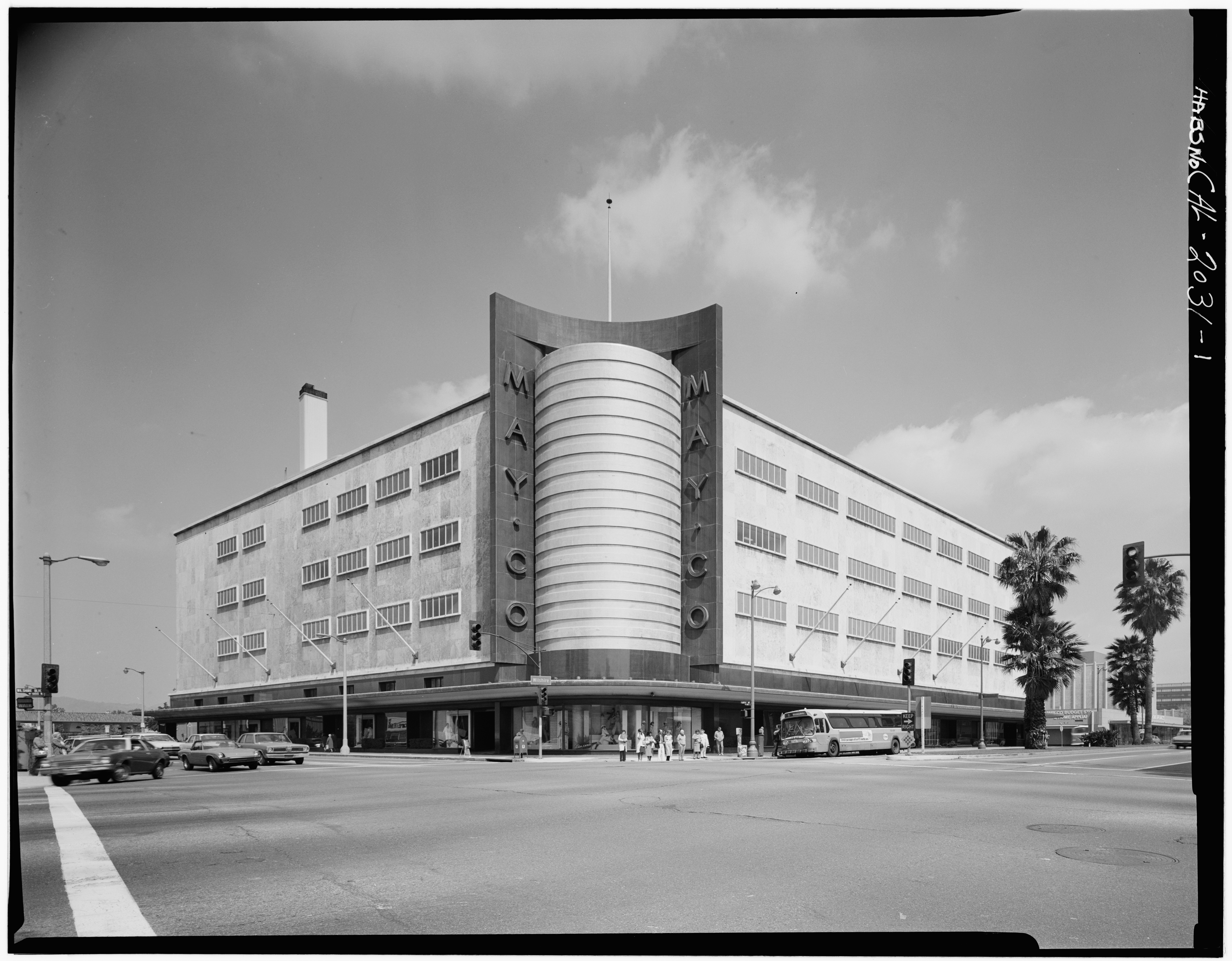
May Company Wilshire, 1970s

The May Company Building, completed in 1939, is a landmark Streamline Moderne structure. It was deemed a Los Angeles Historic-Cultural Monument in 1992.

=== LACMA West ===
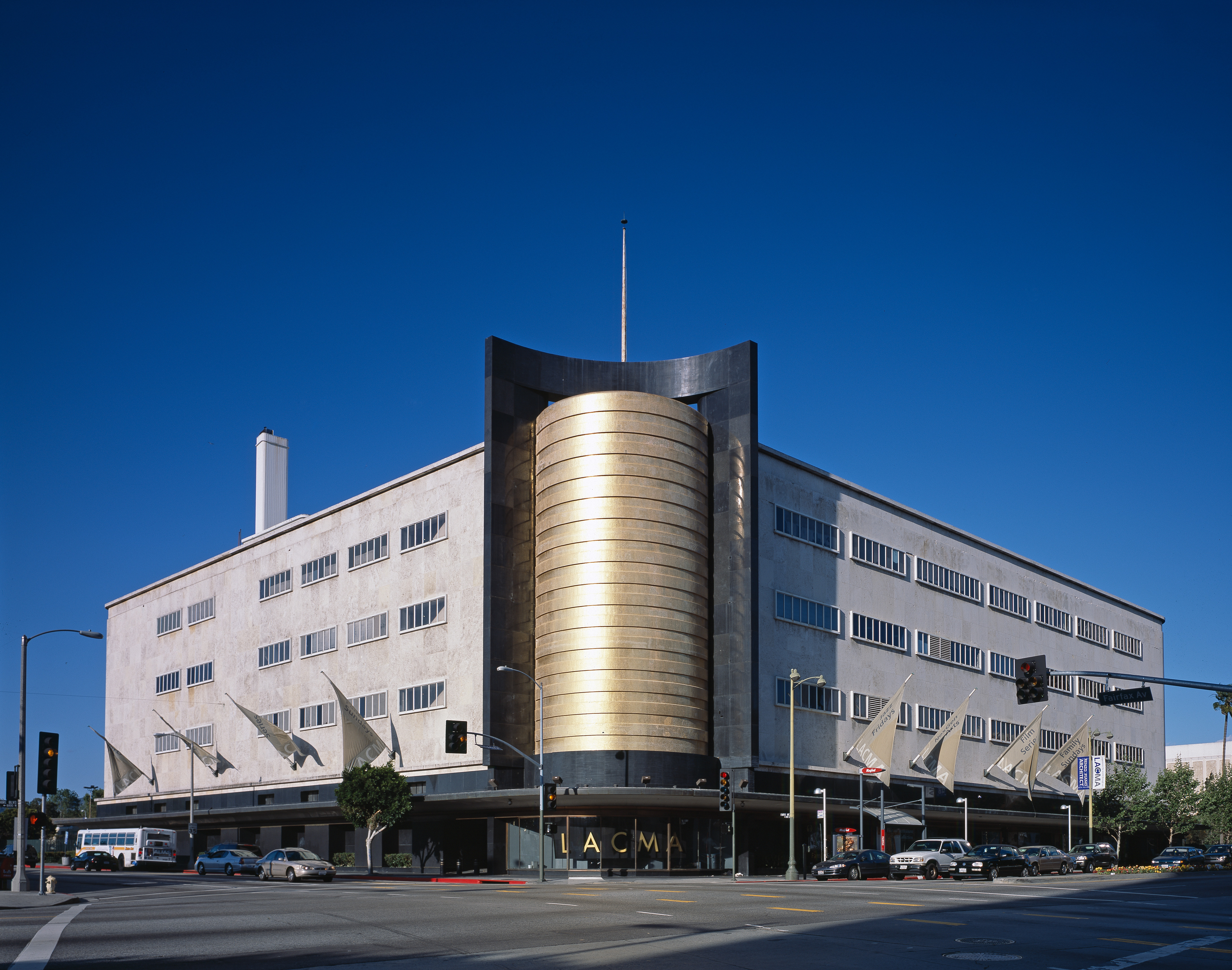
LACMA West, early 2000s

After being vacant for two years, the Los Angeles County Museum of Art (LACMA) acquired the building in 1994 and used it—under the name "LACMA West"—as exhibition space. In 2014, the Academy Museum of Motion Pictures agreed to a 55-year lease with LACMA to include the May Company Building, as well as the adjacent land to build the David Geffen Theater.

=== Academy Museum of Motion Pictures ===
The May Company Building was renamed in recognition of philanthropist Cheryl Saban and entertainment executive Haim Saban's $50 million (~$64.5 million in 2025) donation to the museum in 2017. The Saban Building has served as the main building of the Academy Museum of Motion Pictures since 2021.

In 2012, the Academy of Motion Picture Arts and Sciences CEO Dawn Hudson asked Pritzker Prize-winning architect Renzo Piano to design the 300,000-square-foot campus consisting of the former May Company Building and a spherical addition attached by three glass bridges.

The museum's design plan called for the renovation of the original structure, which included a full restoration of the exterior—most notably its cylindrical façade. The cylinder comprises more than 350,000 glass and gold leaf mosaic tiles. While the restoration project, led by preservation specialist John Fidler, aimed to preserve as many of the original tiles as possible, those that had to be replaced were sourced from Orsoni, their original manufacturer in Venice, Italy. The majority of the Saban Building is covered in Texas limestone panels which had started to deteriorate. Fidler used helical anchors to hold each panel in place before cutting away at the spoiled and broken stone and removing the corroding metal. Fundamentally, this restored the exterior of the building.

Renzo Piano was also commissioned to design the building's new spherical addition. The 130-foot-tall sphere building is home to the 1,000-seat David Geffen Theater and is topped by the glass-domed Dolby Family Terrace which offers guests a panoramic view of the city and the Hollywood sign.

== Appearances in popular culture ==
The building was featured in Visiting... with Huell Howser Episode 702. It is also featured prominently in the 1988 film Miracle Mile starring Anthony Edwards and Mare Winningham.

The building was destroyed in the 1997 movie Volcano.
