= May Company Building (Los Angeles) =

- U.S. Historic district – Contributing property
- Los Angeles Historic-Cultural Monument
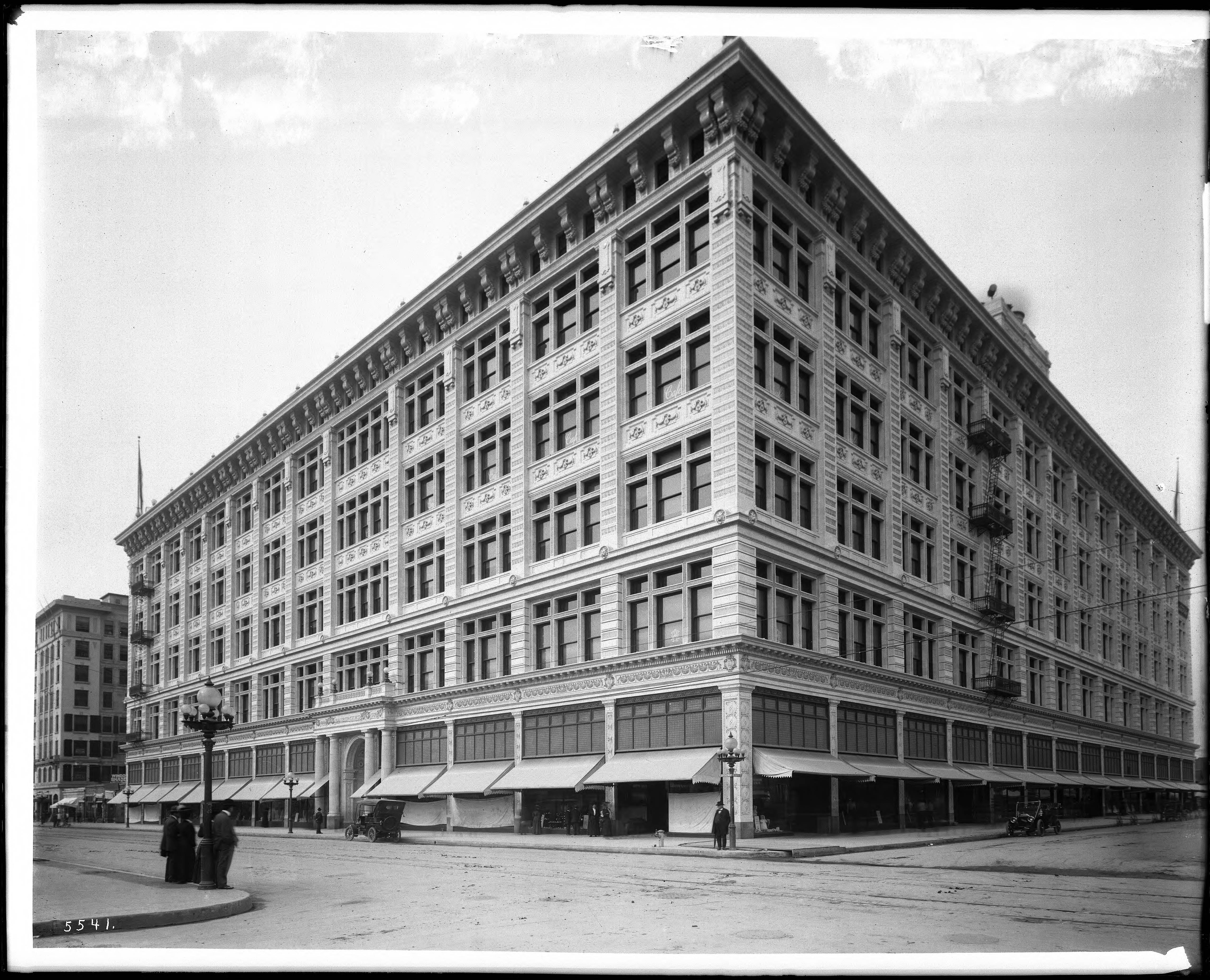
- Exterior of Hamburger's Store Building (later May Company Building) on Eighth Street and Broadway, c. 1912

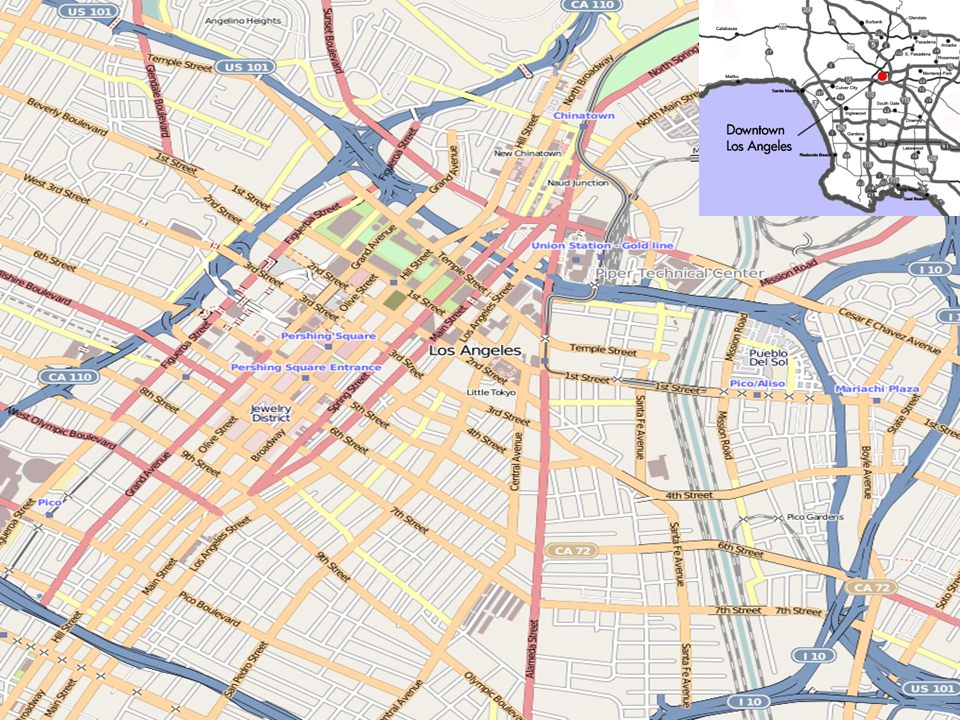
- Location within Downtown Los Angeles
- Location: 801 S. Broadway; Los Angeles
- Coordinates: 34.043728°N 118.2548894°W
- Area: 1,100,000 square feet (100,000 m^{2})
- Built: 1906
- Architect: Alfred F. Rosenheim
- Architectural style: Beaux-Arts
- Part of: Broadway Theater and Commercial District (ID79000484)
- LAHCM No.: 459

Significant dates
- Designated CP: May 9, 1979
- Designated LAHCM: October 17, 1989

Location of Hamburger's/May Co. Building

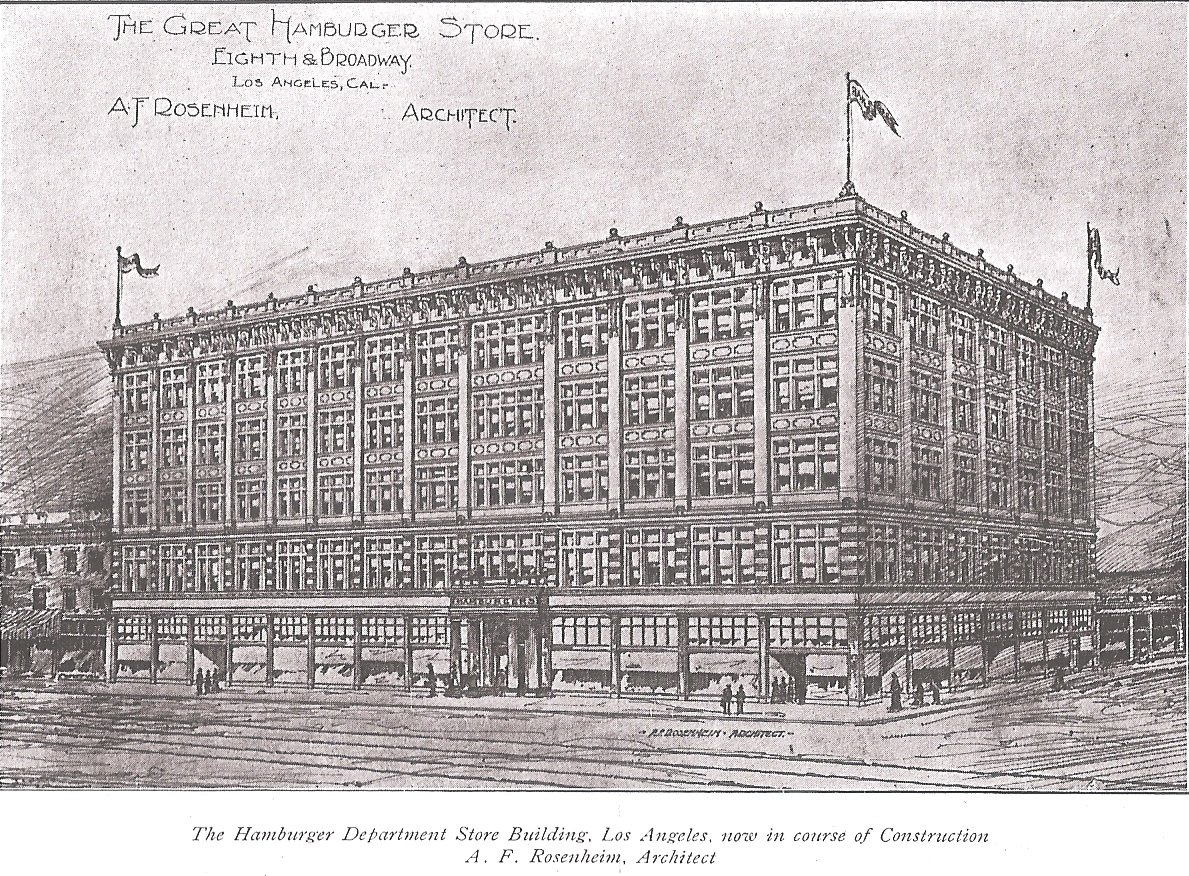
Hamburger Department Store design, c. 1906

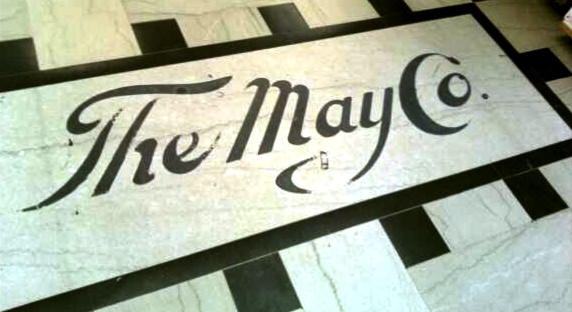
The May Company terrazzo at the entrance of the company's flagship department store in downtown Los Angeles

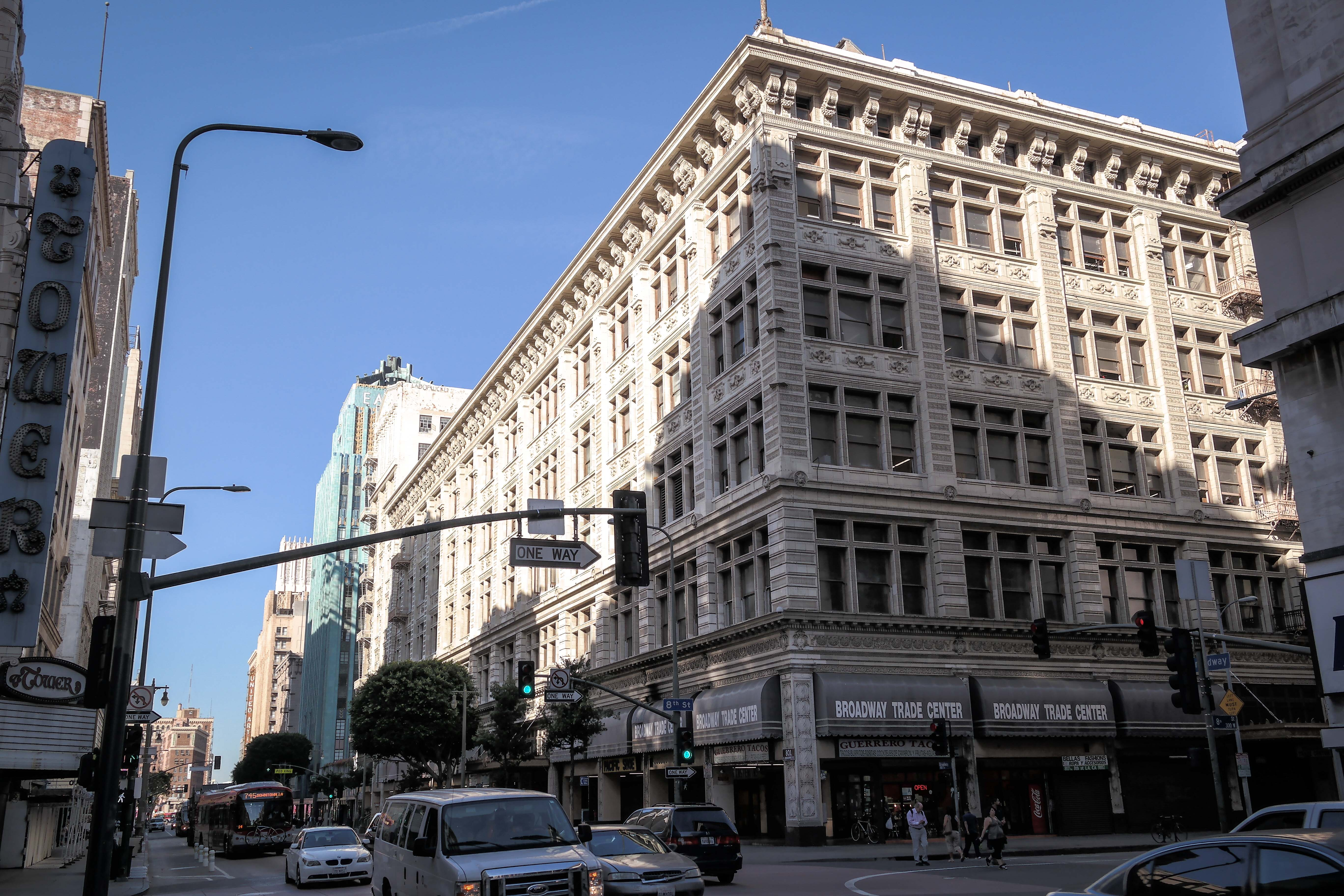
Contemporary view of the May Company Broadway building

The May Company Building on Broadway in Downtown Los Angeles, a.k.a. Hamburgers/May Company Department Store and the May Department Store Building, later known as the California Broadway Trade Center, was the flagship store of the May Company California department store chain. It is a contributing property to the NRHP-listed Broadway Theater and Commercial District.

== History ==
By the start of the twentieth century, A. Hamburger & Sons had outgrown their Spring Street location, which had 520 employees working on five floors. The Hamburger family decided to build a much larger store at the southeast corner of Broadway and Eighth, a location that was outside of then current retail district. Construction started in 1905 with a grand opening held in 1908. This location, which was also known as The Great White Store, was the largest department store building west of Chicago at that time and would eventually become the flagship location for the May Company California. At the time that the Great White Store was opened, the store could boast of having one of the first escalators on the West Coast, several restaurants, a drug store with an 80-foot-long soda fountain, grocery store, bakery, fruit store, meat market, U.S. post office, telegraph office, barber shop, a dentist, a chiropractor, a physician's office with a fully equipped operating room, a 1,000-seat auditorium, an electricity and steam power plant in the basement that was large enough to support a city of 50,000 inhabitants, a private volunteer 120 men fire brigade, 13 acres (5.3 ha) of retail space, and 1200 employees.

The Los Angeles Public Library was also located on the third floor from 1908 to 1913. Southwest Academy of Art opened in the building in 1912 and Woodbury Business College was also briefly located on the fifth floor.

In 1923, the Hamburgers sold their store to the May family of St. Louis for $8.5 million (~$121 million in 2024). Thomas and Wilbur Mays, sons of the founder of the May Company, were sent to manage the former Hamburger store. One of the first things that they did was to expand the store again by building adjacent additions on the other parts of the city block. After several more years, the May Company store eventually occupied almost the entire block between Broadway and Hill and between Eighth and Ninth Streets. The old Hamburger store was officially renamed The May Company in 1925.

The department store closed in 1986 when May moved to the Seventh Marketplace and the building was turned into retail on the ground floors and a garment factory on the upper floors.

In 2014 it was announced that Waterbridge Capital had agreed to buy the building for an estimated $115–130 million; L.A. City Council member Jose Huizar indicated plans a mixed-use development to include offices, a hotel, stores and/or apartments or condominiums. The acquisition by Waterbridge Capital and New York real estate developer Jack Jangana - Broadbridge LA LLC - was completed on August 20, 2014.

A spokesman for the company that helped broker the deal said plans include a 24-month renovation that will result in a "creative campus" similar to Twitter's headquarters building in San Francisco. The investors' goal is to create "one of the largest single tech centers" in the United States.

In early 2020, the building was still being renovated when all construction projects in California were halted by order of the governor in March 2020 due to the COVID-19 pandemic. In April 2020, Waterbridge Capital and Continental Equities sought $251 million in bridge financing to replace $213 million in financing from Starwood Property Trust that was about to expire. In August 2020, having failed to secure the additional financing, they began seeking buyers for the unfinished building. In November 2020, it was reported that the asking price was $425 million (~$506 million in 2024). After reports surfaced in April 2021 that the lenders were planning to foreclose on the property, it was announced that Starwood Property Trust agreed to extend funding for the development to the end of the year. An affiliate of Starwood Capital acquired the building in December 2022 at a public foreclosure auction.

As of 2025, the building has been vacant for roughly a decade, and no further plans have been announced for its future.

== See also ==
- List of contributing properties in the Broadway Theater and Commercial District
- List of Los Angeles Historic-Cultural Monuments in Downtown Los Angeles
