= Robinsons-May =

American department store chain

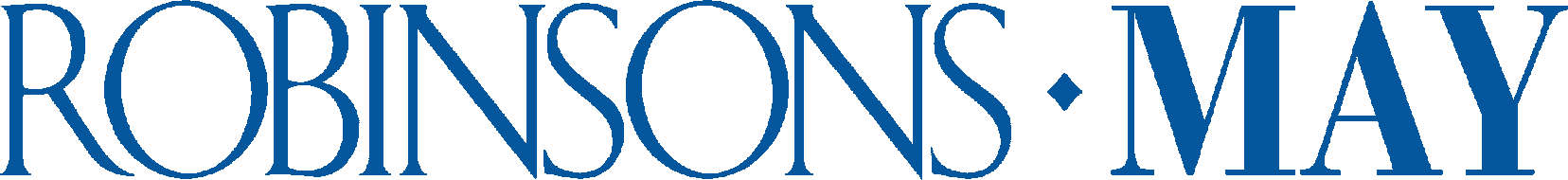

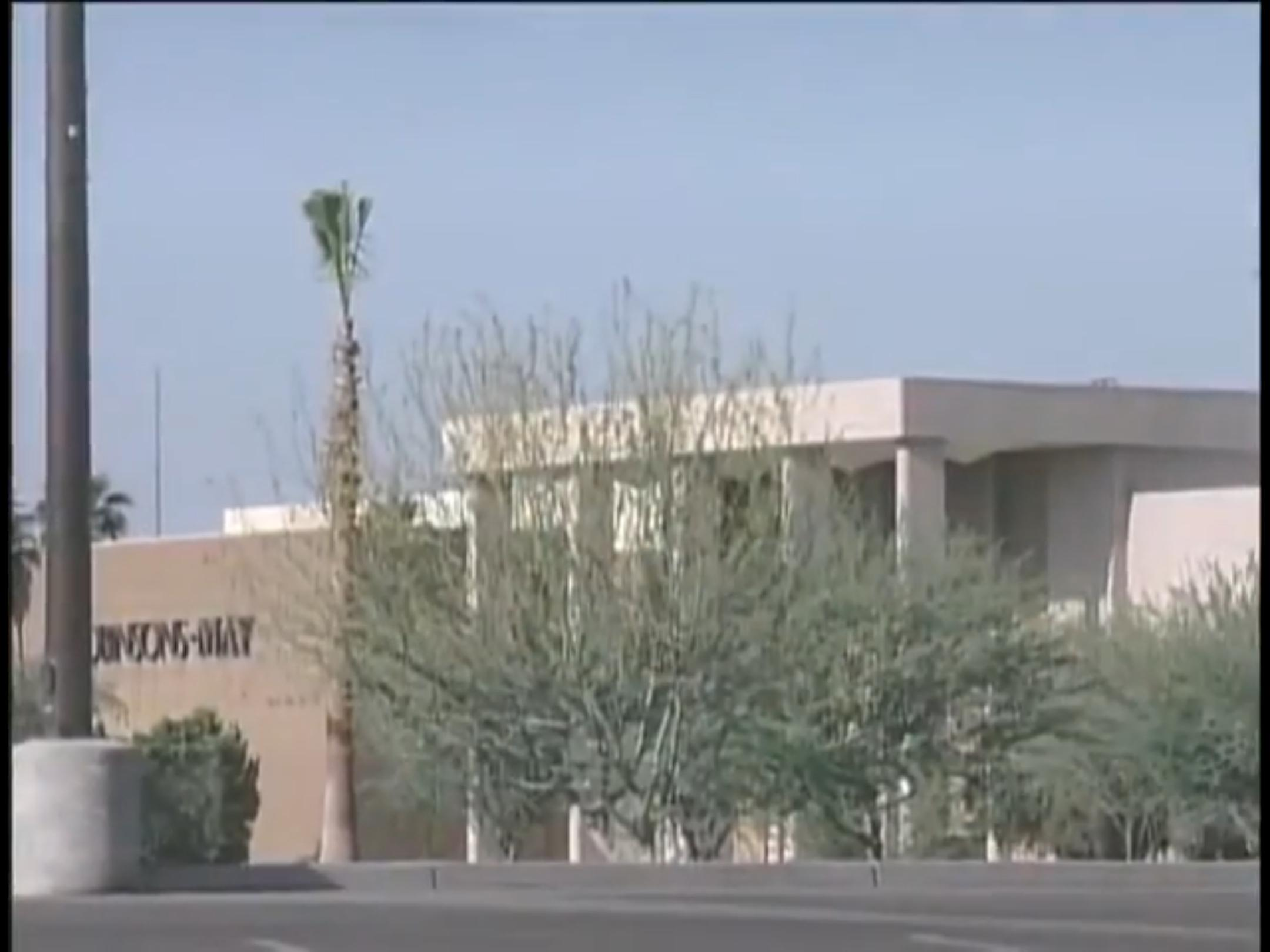
- Exterior of the former Robinsons-May store at Metrocenter in Phoenix
- Type: Subsidiary
- Industry: Retail
- Genre: Department stores
- Predecessors: J.W. Robinson's; May Company California
- Founded: February 1, 1993; 33 years ago in Los Angeles, California, United States
- Defunct: September 9, 2006; 19 years ago
- Fate: Acquisition by Federated Department Stores
- Successors: Bloomingdale's; Macy's
- Headquarters: Los Angeles, California, United States
- Number of locations: 45 (2005)
- Areas served: Arizona; California; Nevada
- Products: Clothing; footwear; bedding; furniture; jewelry; beauty products; housewares.
- Parent: The May Department Stores Company (1993–2005); Federated Department Stores, Inc. (2005–2006)
- Website: Archived official website at the Wayback Machine (archive index)

Robinsons-May was an American department store chain founded in 1993 with the merger of J. W. Robinson's and May Company California. It retained the former May headquarters in Los Angeles, California, and operated in Southern California, Arizona, and Nevada. The holding company The May Department Stores Company was acquired by Federated Department Stores, and remaining Robinsons-May stores were converted to Bloomingdale's and Macy's, in 2005.

== History ==
=== May Company and JW Robinson's ===
The double-barreled Robinsons-May name was created in 1993 when the former May Company California was consolidated with their corporate sibling JW Robinson's. May Department Stores had acquired Robinson's with its 1986 acquisition of Associated Dry Goods Corp. J. W. Robinson's had been acquired by Associated Dry Goods in 1957, while May Company California had been established in 1923 when May acquired the then-named A. Hamburger & Sons (founded in 1881 by Asher Hamburger).

Both chains had operated exclusively in Southern California until 1989 when May Department Stores had dissolved its Goldwaters division, based in Scottsdale, Arizona, and apportioned its Phoenix metropolitan and Las Vegas, Nevada, stores between the still separate J. W. Robinson's and May Company California. In 1997 Robinsons-May absorbed the Tucson-area locations of sister division Foley's, which were themselves the remains of the former Levy's and Sanger-Harris stores. Robinsons-May was further consolidated with Portland, Oregon-based Meier & Frank in 2002, which retained its individual nameplate, but merged its primary headquarters into Robinsons-May's in North Hollywood.

=== Conversion to Macy's ===
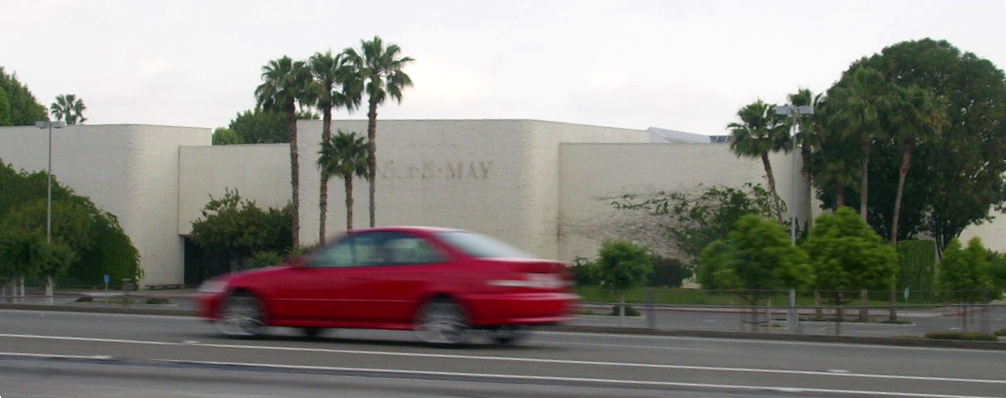
A Robinsons-May store in Riverside, CA with its sign removed leaving a 'label scar', shortly before being converted into a Macy's in 2006.

On August 30, 2005, operational control of the Robinsons-May stores was assumed by Macy's West (the Meier & Frank stores were transferred to Macy's Northwest). Fifteen of its California stores were offered for sale under an agreement with the California State Attorney General, though Federated has retained several of the stores covered by the agreement since satisfactory offers from competitors were not received (including stores at Woodland Hills and Northridge). During 2006, the majority of the Robinsons-May stores were converted to the Macy's or Bloomingdale's nameplate, either as replacements for existing stores, new locations or as expansions of existing locations. Prime locations at South Coast Plaza, Costa Mesa and Fashion Valley Mall, San Diego where Macy's already had stores were shuttered in early 2006 and refurbished as Bloomingdale's locations. The change of store signs occurred on September 9, 2006. Already existing Macy's locations in Arizona and Inland Empire regions relocated from their existing spots to the former sites of Robinsons-May.

The trademark for Robinsons-May was bought by Strategic Marks in 2012 and is currently owned by them to this day, with plans to revive the brand in the future.

== See also ==
- List of defunct department stores of the United States
- List of department stores converted to Macy's
