= Chesterfield Mall =

Defunct mall in Chesterfield, Missouri, U.S.

Coordinates: 38.654°N 90.565°W

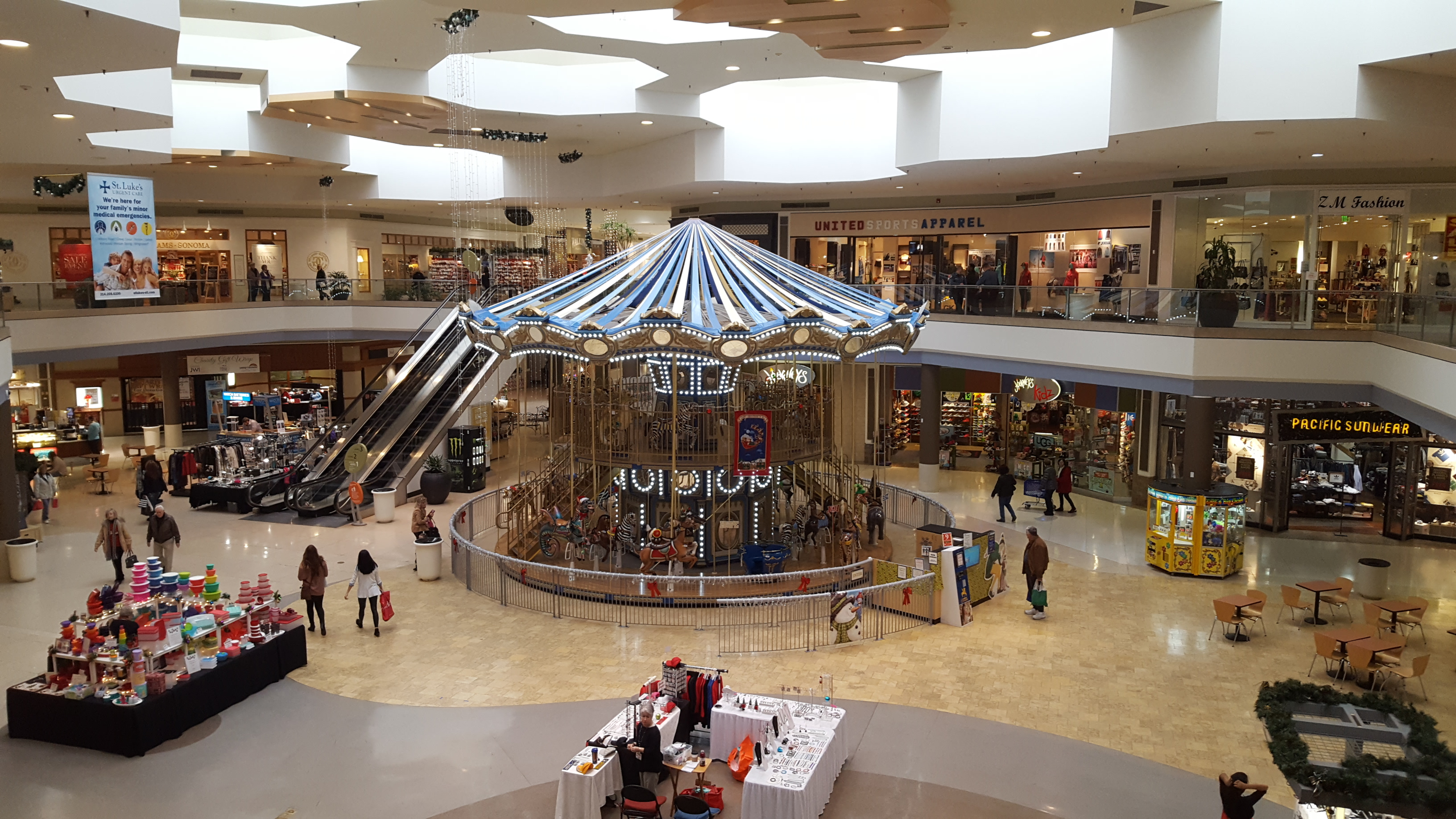
- Location: Chesterfield, Missouri, United States
- Opened: September 1, 1976; 50 years ago
- Closed: August 31, 2024; 2 years ago
- Demolished: October 15, 2024 – April 2025
- Previous names: Westfield Shoppingtown Chesterfield (2002 – 2007)
- Developer: Richard E. Jacobs Group
- Manager: The Staenberg Group
- Owner: The Staenberg Group
- Num. of stores: 150 at peak
- Num. of anchor tenants: 3 (all vacant), formerly 4
- Floor area: 1,293,445 square feet (120,165.0 m^{2})
- Floors: 2 (3 in former Macy's and former Dillard's. AMC occupied dedicated 3rd floor.)
- Parking: 5,976 free spaces
- Public transit: MetroBus
- Website: 2024 archive

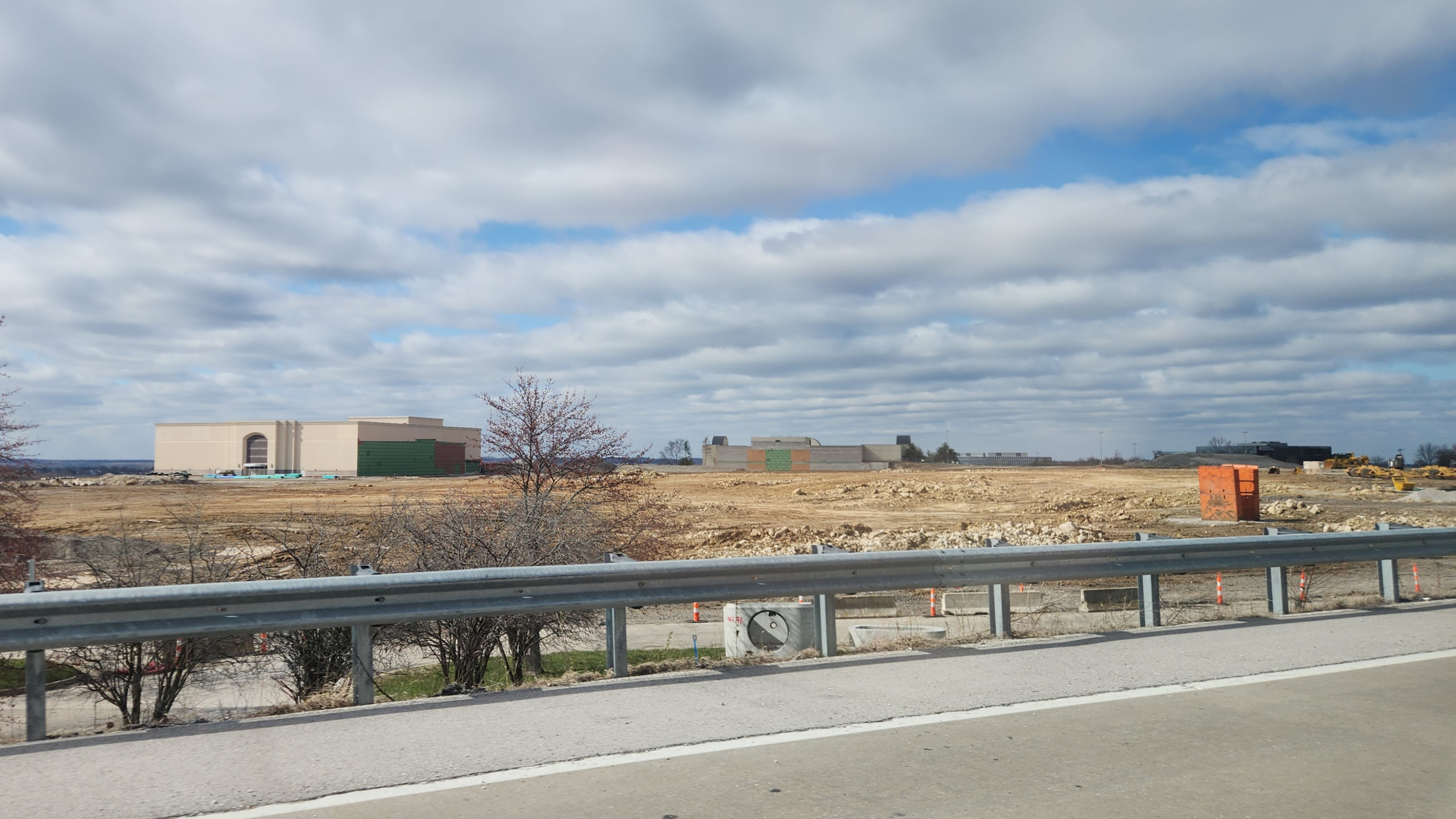
The empty construction site where the Chesterfield Mall once was, as seen from MO-340. The old Macy's and Dillard's buildings are still standing. (March 2026)

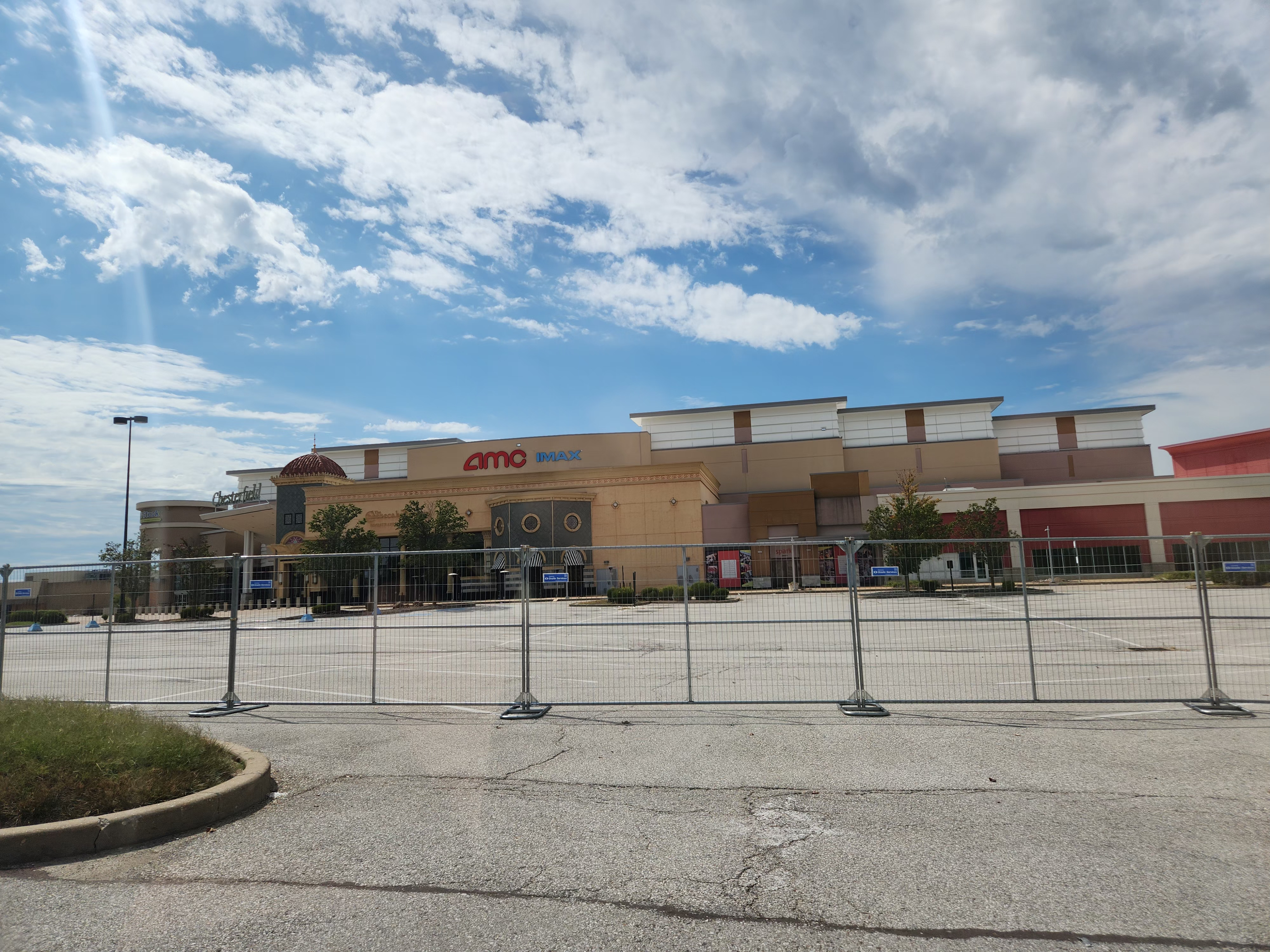
East side of the Chesterfield Mall (September 2024)

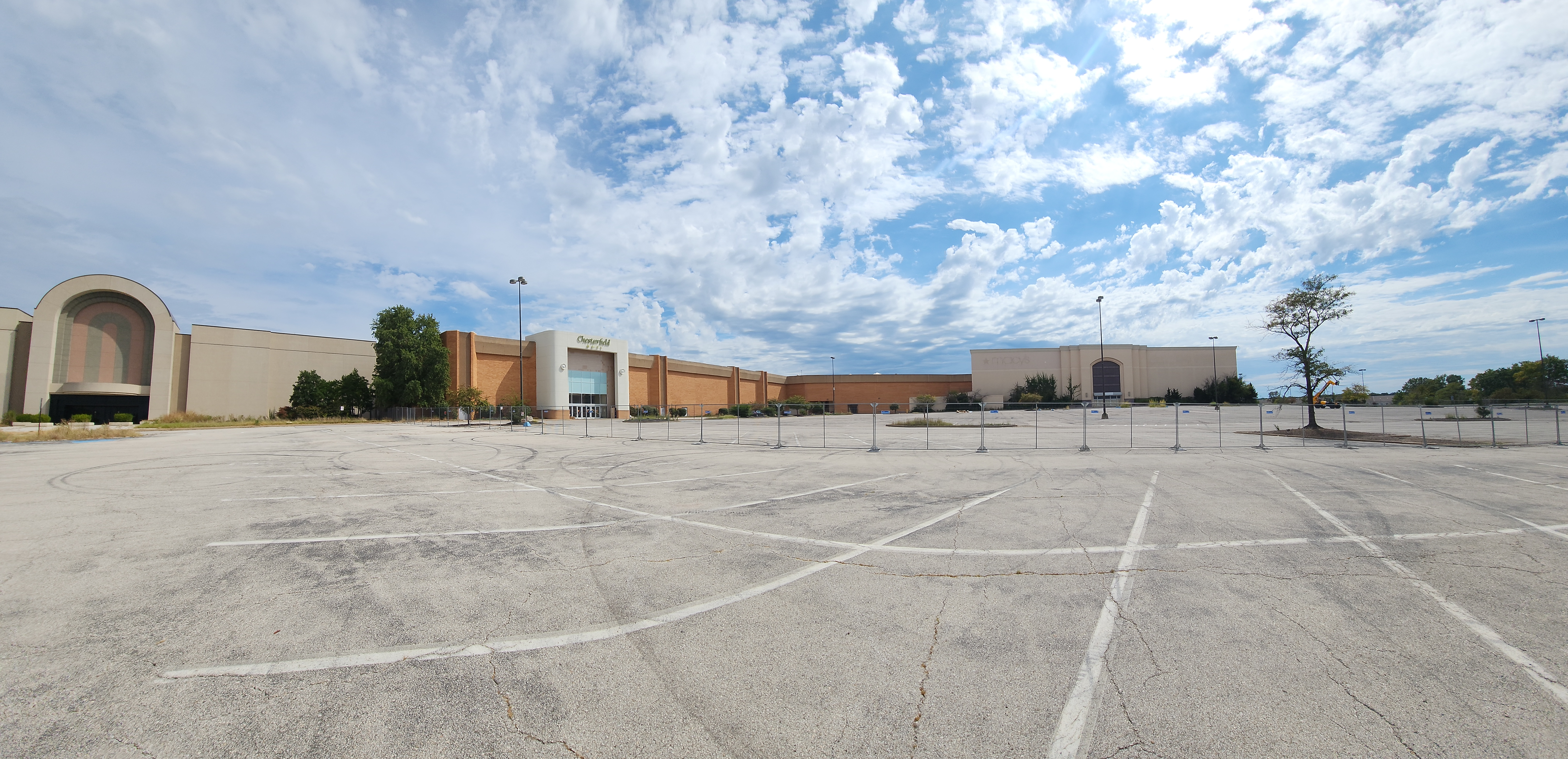
Panorama of Chesterfield Mall west lot (September 2024)

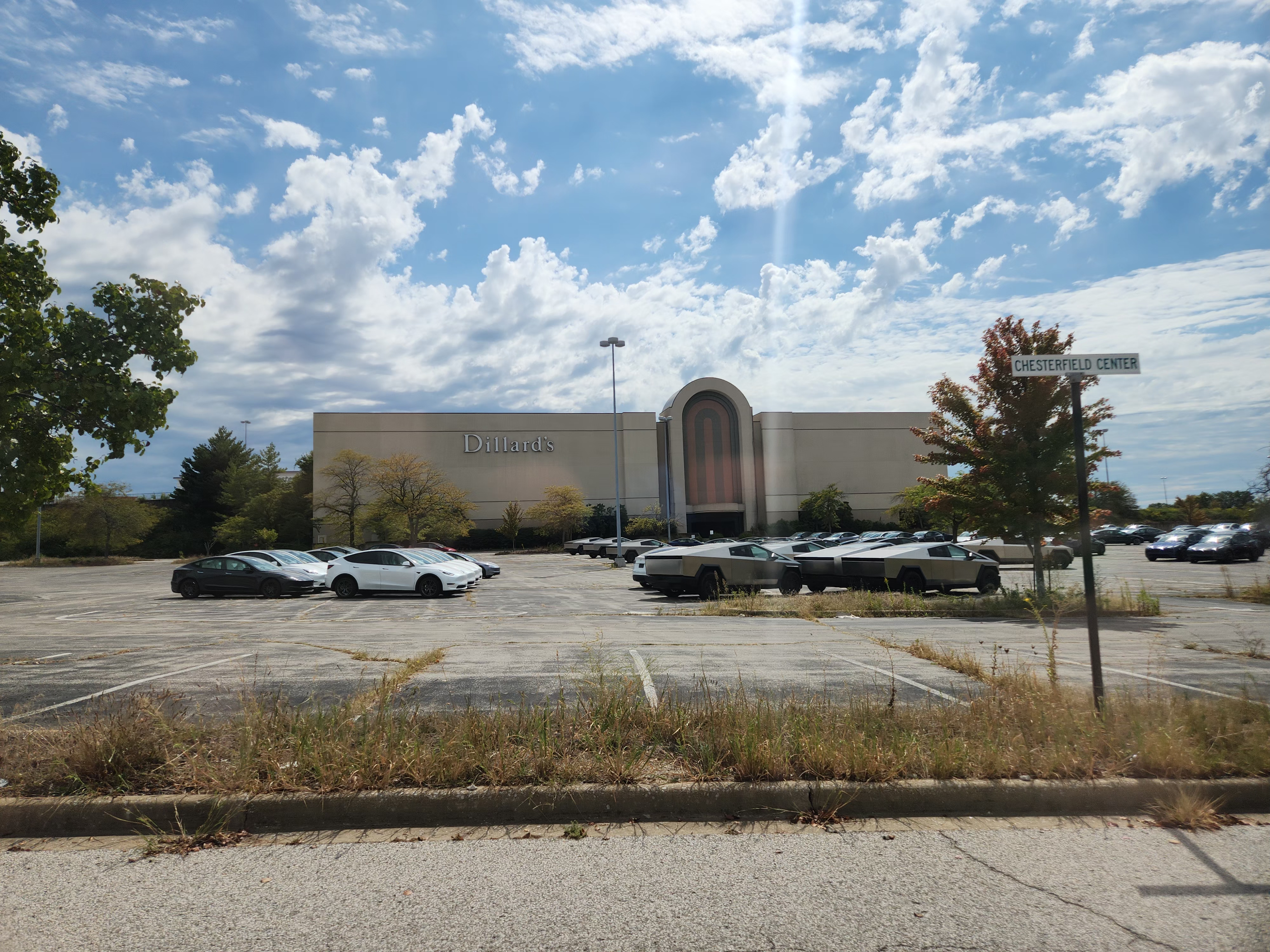
Abandoned Dillard's with Tesla inventory parking (September 2024)

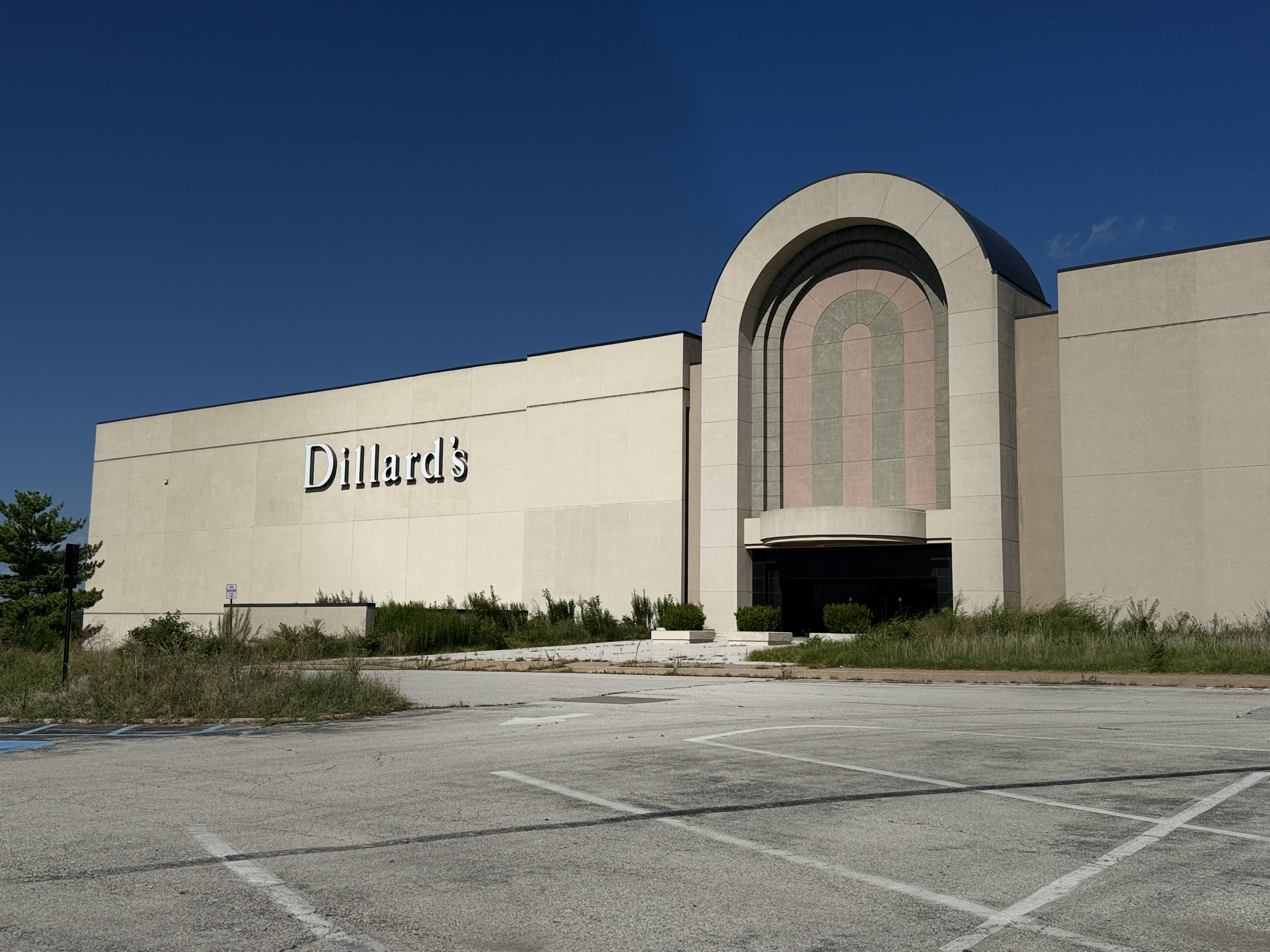
Abandoned Dillard's west entrance (August 2024)

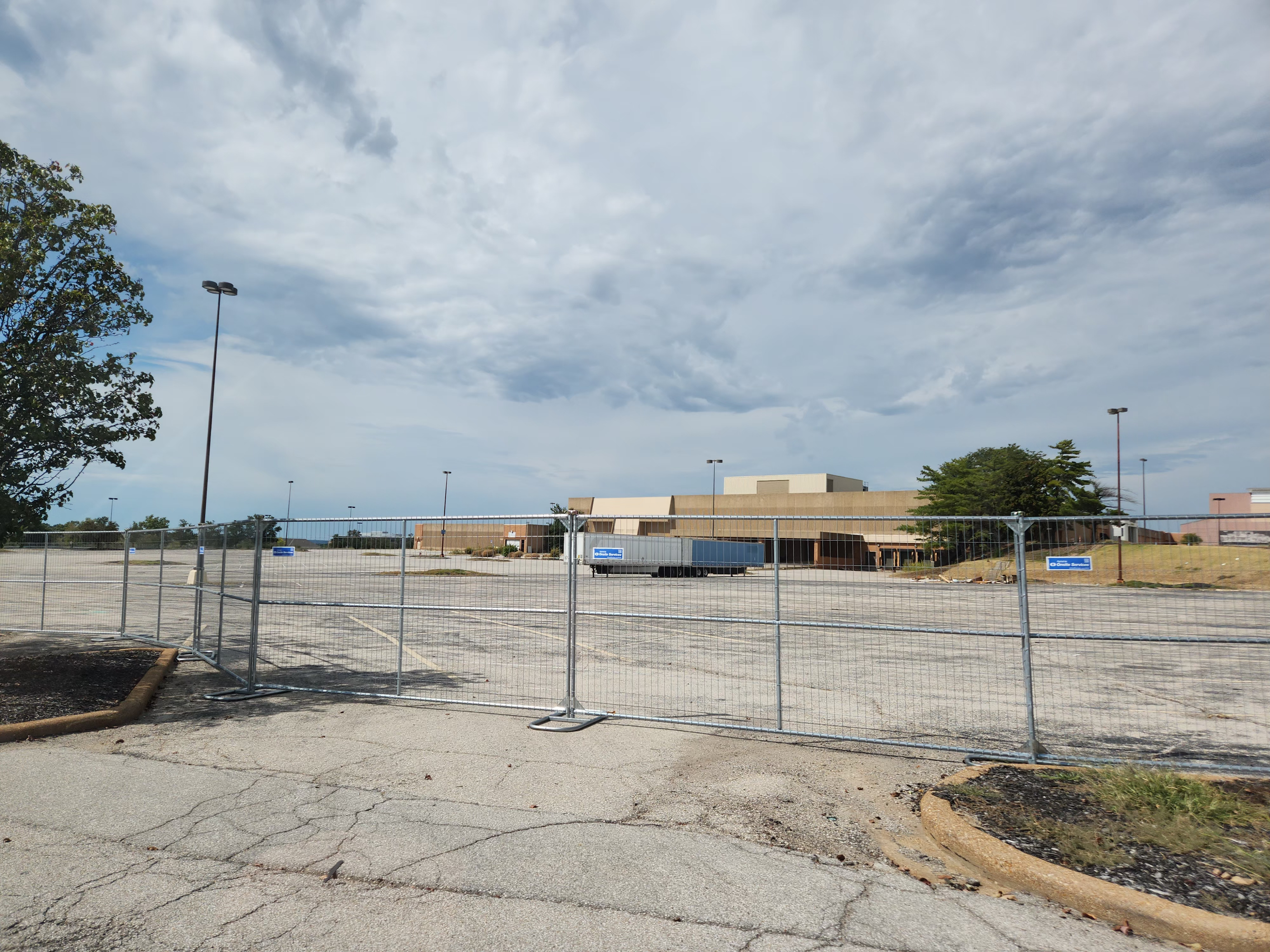
Abandoned Sears parking lot (September 2024)

Chesterfield Mall was a shopping mall in Chesterfield, Missouri, at the intersection of Interstate 64/U.S. Routes 40-61 and Clarkson Road (Route 340). The mall opened in 1976, built by Richard Jacobs. With the closing of Northwest Plaza in St. Ann in 2010, Chesterfield Mall became the largest shopping mall in the St. Louis metropolitan area. The entire mall closed permanently on August 31, 2024, for demolition and construction of a mixed-use development. It was demolished in 2025, with only the Dillard's and Macy's (Famous-Barr) buildings kept for future use.

== History ==
The mall was developed by the and Richard E. Jacobs Group and opened on September 1, 1976, as the sister mall to Jamestown Mall in Florissant, Missouri. The mall's original two anchor stores were Sears and Stix, Baer, and Fuller. Two years later in 1978, the four-screen Chesterfield Mall 4 Cinema opened in a separate building adjacent to the mall, near Stix. In 1983, Famous-Barr opened as the third anchor on the East side of the mall. One year later in 1984, Dillard's replaced Stix, Baer, and Fuller, after buying them out. In 1995, a new Famous-Barr anchor store was built adjacent to the former space, which JCPenney later took over. The mall was renovated in 1996. In 2000, the four-screen cinema closed.

In 2002, the mall was purchased by Westfield and renamed Westfield Shoppingtown Chesterfield. In 2005, the JCPenney anchor store closed and the space was demolished. It was replaced by multiple smaller shops and restaurants, including Borders (then V-Stock), The Cheesecake Factory, an American Girl store, a food court, and a 14-screen AMC Megaplex, on a new third floor.

In 2007, the mall was sold to CBL & Associates Properties. Borders closed in 2011 and was replaced with V∙Stock. Anchor store Dillard's closed temporarily in September 2016, due to flooding following a water main break. The store was expected to reopen in 2017, but in early 2018 the company announced the location would permanently close. The building remains vacant, but Dillard's announced in 2024 that it will re-open its Chesterfield location as part of the future Downtown Chesterfield redevelopment project.

The mall was placed in receivership in the third quarter of 2016, pending foreclosure, with management transferred to Madison Marquette while a new owner was sought. The foreclosure finalized in June 2017, making C-III Capital Partners the temporary owner. The mall's anchor stores, though attached to the mall, are owned separately.

Hull Property Group purchased the mall in 2018, In March 2018, the St. Louis area's only American Girl store in the mall, closed. On May 31, 2018, it was announced Sears would close, as a part of a plan to close 72 stores nationwide, also including the nearby South County Center location. Sears closed on September 2, 2018, leaving Macy's the last remaining anchor. In late 2018, the AMC Cinema was downgraded to an AMC Classic.

In February 2020, The Staenberg Group bought the mall from Hull Property Group and announced plans to spend nearly $1 billion redeveloping the property. In 2021, vacant parts of the mall were repurposed for indoor community sports and other "eclectic tenants".

Macy's closed their 200,000-square-foot (19,000 m^{2}) anchor store on November 11, 2022. They opened a smaller 32,000-square-foot (3,000 m^{2}) Market by Macy's in nearby Chesterfield Commons. Liquidation sales started in early September, leaving the mall with no anchors left, turning it into a dead mall. In May 2023, the AMC Classic Chesterfield 14 closed permanently.

Liquidation sales of the mall's fixtures began in early May 2023. Redevelopment plans call for the mall to be turned into a mixed-use property with housing, office, dining, and retail called Downtown Chesterfield, set to begin construction once the mall finishes demolition. In 2024 the central lower level was turned into pickle ball and badminton courts owned by Arch Badminton & Pickle ball. V-Stock closed on July 28, 2024. The Cheesecake Factory closed on August 18, 2024, leaving the mall almost completely vacant. The entire mall closed permanently on August 31, 2024, and demolition began on October 15, 2024, continuing into April 2025. The former Macy's and Dillard's buildings remain standing for future use.
