= West Park Mall =

Shopping mall in Missouri, U.S.

- Location: Cape Girardeau, Missouri
- Coordinates: 37°17′53″N 89°34′14″W
- Address: 3049 William Street
- Opened: 1981
- Developer: Drury Development Corp. and May Centers, Inc.
- Manager: Pace Properties
- Owner: River City Centre LLC
- Num. of stores: 60+
- Num. of anchor tenants: 6
- Floor area: 507,555 sq ft (47,153.4 m^{2})
- Floors: 1
- Public transit: Cape Girardeau Transit Authority

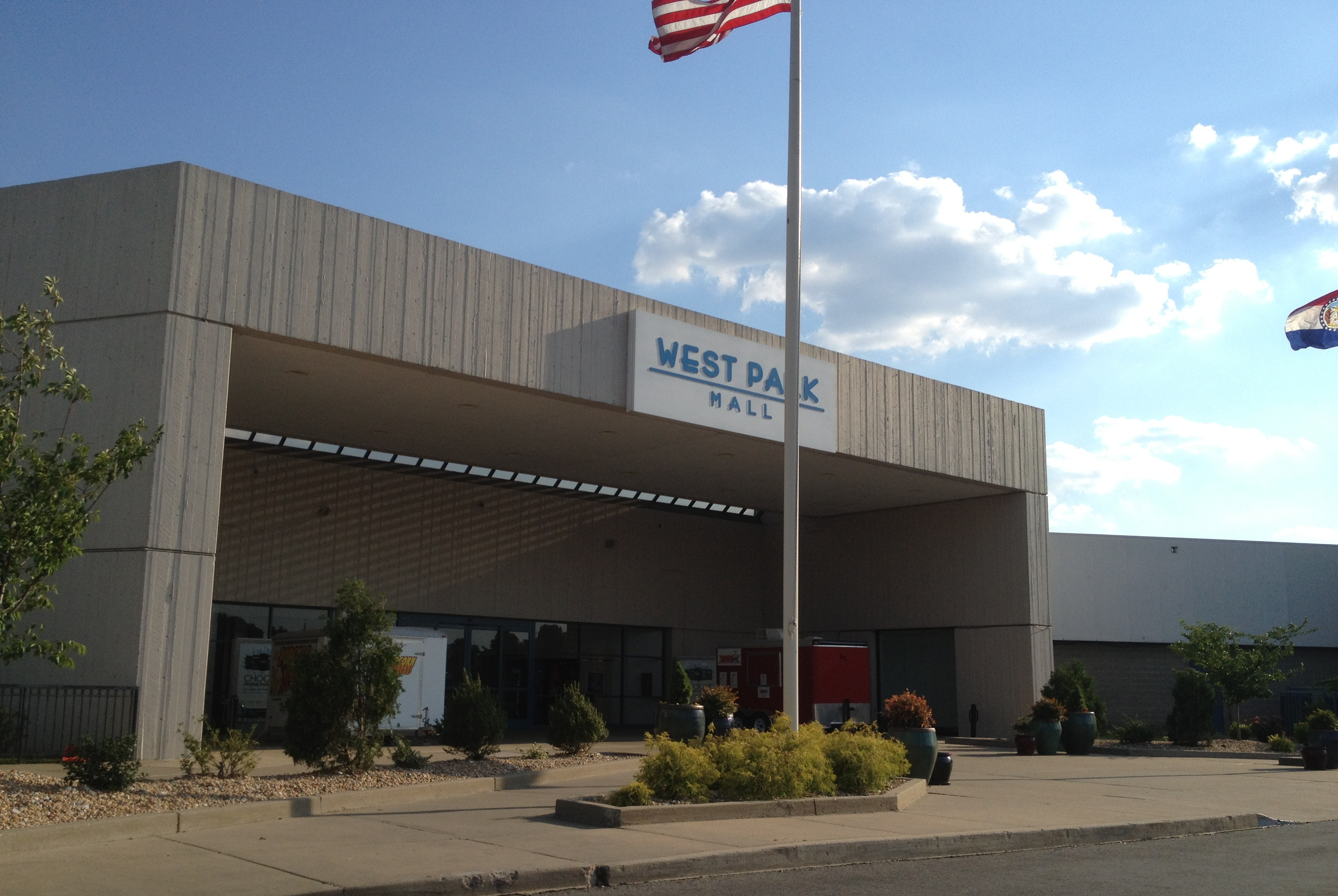
Exterior entrance of West Park Mall

West Park Mall is an enclosed shopping mall in Cape Girardeau, Missouri. Opened in 1981, it is anchored by JCPenney (100,466 sq ft (9,333.6 m^{2})), Simple Home (80,710 sq ft (7,498 m^{2})), Sierra Trading Post, Ochs Powersports, PetSmart, and Ross Dress for Less, as well as junior anchors Old Navy, and Barnes & Noble.

== History ==
The mall was built in 1981 by a partnership between St. Louis-based May Centers, Inc., and Cape Girardeau-based Drury Development Corp., developer of the Drury Hotel Chain, It featured Famous-Barr (later Macy's) and JCPenney as its anchor stores, with original tenants including Hallmark Cards, Foot Locker, Kay-Bee Toys, Claire's, Zales Jewelers, GNC, Waldenbooks, and Lerner New York. An 80,000-square-foot (7,400 m^{2}) Venture was added as a third anchor in 1984. Westfield Group bought the mall from CenterMark in 1993, and renamed it Westfield Shoppingtown West Park in 1998.

The Venture store closed in 1998, the same year in which the mall owners proposed adding a fourth anchor store. The West Park Mall Venture store and another at Kentucky Oaks Mall in nearby Paducah, Kentucky both became Shopko in 1999, bringing West Park to 100 percent occupancy for the first time in its history. Shopko closed in 2001.

Old Navy opened in the mall in 2004. A year later, the former Venture and Shopko space became Steve & Barry's. In 2006, Westfield sold the mall to Centro Watt (which in 2011 rebranded as Brixmor Property Group), who reverted it to its original name. Barnes & Noble was also added.

Several stores closed in the mall between 2008 and 2010, including Steve & Barry's, Pacific Sunwear, Tilt, (a video arcade that was originally called "The Gold Mine" in the 1980s,) and a restaurant which had been at the mall for 24 years. Despite these vacancies, the mall was 88 percent occupied in 2010, with several of its original stores still in operation. Brixmor hired Madison Marquette to be the manager of the mall in mid-2012.

Ashley Furniture opened in 2018 in the former Venture building.

On January 5, 2021, it was announced that Macy’s would be closing as part of a plan to close 46 stores nationwide. The store closed on March 21, 2021.

In the 2020s, Ashley Furniture was later rebranded as Simple Home and continues to operate in the former Ashley Furniture space. Ochs Powersports, a motorsports store, expressed interest in opening at the mall and the Simple Home space was subdivided to add the new tenant.

The 2020s saw several new shops open at the mall as part of a multimillion dollar renovation of the former Macy’s to add new stores. Sierra Trading Post, Carters, and Ross Dress for Less opened at the mall. Several other retailers moved to the mall such as PetSmart, Michael’s, and the beauty store Ulta.
