= CenterMark Properties =

Former American shopping mall developer

CenterMark
- Formerly: May Centers, Inc. (1947–1992)
- Company type: Subsidiary
- Industry: Mall development
- Founded: 1947; 79 years ago
- Defunct: 1996; 30 years ago
- Fate: Acquired by Westfield Group
- Successors: Westfield Group; General Growth Properties; Brookfield Properties; Unibail-Rodamco-Westfield SE; Macy's Inc. (for previous owner May Department Stores)
- Products: Shopping malls
- Parent: The May Department Stores Company (1947–1992); Prudential Insurance (1992–1993); General Growth Properties / Westfield Group (1993–1996); Brookfield Properties / Unibail-Rodamco-Westfield (2018–present); GGP (2026–present)

CenterMark, formerly known as May Centers, was a mall development company owned by a consortium of Westfield Holdings Ltd., General Growth Properties, and Whitehall Street Real Estate L.P. III. It was formerly owned by the May Department Stores Company until 1992, and Prudential Insurance until 1993.

== History ==
The company previously developed malls under the name May Centers, Inc., which was then a subsidiary of the May Department Stores Company. The first shopping center that May Department Stores developed was an open-air shopping center that first opened in 1947 that later became the Baldwin Hills Crenshaw Plaza in Los Angeles. This shopping center grew around the second branch store of the May Company California division that opened on this site in 1947.

A few years later, the May Department Stores built and opened in 1955 the Northland Shopping Center in Jennings, Missouri, to house one of their first suburban branch stores for their Famous-Barr department store division.

In 1958, May Department Stores formed a subsidiary to handle their shopping center development which they called May Shopping Centers, Inc.

During the mid-1980s, the May Department Stores noticed that their company's stock was vastly undervalued and that the company was at risk of becoming a hostile takeover target, May Department Stores needed to re-purchase some of its company's stock to increase the share price. To accomplish this, they needed to obtain cash quickly, which they did by making a deal with Prudential Insurance in which the insurance company gave May $550 million in exchange for 50% ownership of May Centers in 1988. In 1992, Prudential purchased the rest of May Centers and renamed the company CenterMark.

The following year Prudential sold CenterMark to a consortium headed by Des Moines-based General Growth Properties and also included Australia-based Westfield Holdings Ltd. and Whitehall Street Real Estate L.P. III, an investment partnership operated by Goldman, Sachs & Co. At the time of the sale, CenterMark had owned or had interest in 19 malls or shopping centers in six states. In 1996, General Growth sold its share to Westfield, which enabled Westfield to add these properties to its existing collection of properties and rebrand all of their new acquisitions to the Westfield brand.

Under May Department Stores ownership, the company obtained new retail projects only by creating them on previously undeveloped land. Under successive owners, the company did not develop any new properties nor purchase any new properties from other owners.

=== Fate of some of the former May Centers/CenterMark properties ===
The majority of the properties that were initially developed by May had become very successful and had become a part of Westfield and remain so as of January 2016. However, not all of the original May properties were sold to Westfield and a few properties that Westfield purchased were later sold.

Laurel Plaza is a special case. At the time of the sale of May Centers, Laurel Plaza also housed the headquarters for May Company California in addition to a regional store, so May Department Stores retained this property. May was trying to enlarge this mall in 1988. Because of damage incurred during the 1994 Northridge earthquake, May and its successor Macy's were unable to dispose of the property until 2014.

In 1988, May Centers almost sold La Jolla Village Square to T&S Development, but the deal fell apart at the last minute. Four years later, May Centers was finally able to sell La Jolla Village Square to Gordon/Beck Ventures in 1992 after a number of years of trying to locate a buyer for this particular property.

In July 1992, May Centers as the newly renamed CenterMark, sold the ailing Northland Shopping Center in Missouri to San Antonio-based Spigel Properties for an undisclosed amount.

Westfield sold most of its St. Louis-area malls to Chattanooga-based CBL & Associates Properties. St. Clair Square was sold in 1996. Mid-Rivers Mall, South County Center, and West County Center were sold in 2007.

In 2006, Westfield sold four former May Center malls to Centro Watt, an American company by that time owned by another Australian-based company Centro Properties Group. These properties include Eagle Rock Plaza, Enfield Square, West Park Mall, and Westland Towne Centre. Economically, these locations were not performing as well as they should. In 2012, Madison Marquette Retail Services was hired to manage these properties.

In November 2015, Westfield sold Westfield Carlsbad, formerly Plaza Camino Real, to Rouse Properties.

On December 18, 2015, Vancouver Mall along with some other U.S. Westfield properties were sold to Centennial Real Estate Company, and "Westfield" was removed from the mall's name. Any other references to Westfield online or at the property were removed the same day. Mall management was retained.

Starting in the 2020s, Westfield (now part of French conglomerate Unibail-Rodamco-Westfield) began selling multiple properties that were deemed by the company to be "non-flagship" properties. This included multiple properties acquired in the CenterMark deal, such as Westfield Meriden (sold in May 2020,) Westfield Mission Valley (sold in July 2023) and Westfield Annapolis (sold in August 2024.) Following their acquisition, Westfield branding would be removed from each property; of the three, only Westfield Annapolis would revert to its original name of Annapolis Mall.

== List of projects ==
Some of the malls that May Centers built included:

- Alton Square Mall, Alton, Illinois (opened 1978)
- Annapolis Mall, Annapolis, Maryland (opened 1980)
- Ballston Common Mall (now Ballston Quarter), Arlington, Virginia (reopened 1986)
- Eagle Rock Plaza, Los Angeles, California (opened 1973)
- Eastland Center, West Covina, California (opened 1957)
- Enfield Square, Enfield, Connecticut (opened 1971)
- La Jolla Village Square, La Jolla, California (opened 1979; sold 1992 to Gordon/Beck Ventures)
- Laurel Plaza, North Hollywood, California (opened 1968; sold 2014)
- Meriden Square (now Meriden Mall), Meriden, Connecticut (opened 1971)
- Mid Rivers Mall, St. Peters, Missouri (opened 1981)
- Mission Valley Center (now Mission Valley), San Diego, California (opened 1961)
- Montgomery Mall (now Westfield Montgomery), Bethesda, Maryland (opened 1968)
- Northland Shopping Center (now Buzz Westfall Plaza on the Boulevard), Jennings, Missouri (opened 1955)
- Plaza Bonita (now Westfield Plaza Bonita), National City, California (opened 1981)
- Plaza Camino Real (now The Shoppes at Carlsbad), Carlsbad, California (opened 1969)
- St. Clair Square, Fairview Heights, Illinois (opened 1974)
- South County Center, St. Louis, Missouri (opened 1963)
- Topanga Plaza (now Westfield Topanga), Canoga Park, California (opened 1964)
- Vancouver Mall, Vancouver, Washington (opened 1977)
- West County Center, Des Peres, Missouri (opened 1969)
- West Covina Fashion Place (now Plaza West Covina), West Covina, California (reopened 1975)
- West Park Mall, Cape Girardeau, Missouri (opened 1981)
- Westland Center, Lakewood, Colorado (opened 1960)
