= Enfield Square =

Defunct mall in Hartford County, Connecticut, U.S.

Coordinates: 41.995°N 72.582°W

Enfield Square Mall
- Location: Enfield, Connecticut, United States
- Address: 90 Elm Street Enfield, Connecticut, 06082
- Opened: November 4, 1971; 55 years ago
- Closed: March 2026 (Target left open)
- Previous names: Westfield Shoppingtown Enfield Square
- Developer: May Centers, Inc.
- Manager: Woodsonia Real Estate; Namdar Realty Group
- Owner: Enfield Square Realty
- Num. of stores: 54
- Num. of anchor tenants: 4 (1 open, 3 vacant)
- Floor area: 788,000 sq ft (73,200 m^{2})
- Floors: 1 (2 in both former Macy's locations)

Enfield Square Mall (formerly Westfield Shoppingtown Enfield Square), was an enclosed shopping mall in Enfield, Connecticut. The mall property is owned by Woodsonia Real Estate. At 788,000 square feet (73,200 m^{2}), Enfield Square Mall was the 10th largest mall in the state of Connecticut, once containing a total of 54 shops, all on one level. As of 2025, there is only a single anchor store in operation: Target. The mall fell through the plan for demolition and redevelopment into a mixed-use community hub, which resulted in it closing in the spring of 2026.

== History ==
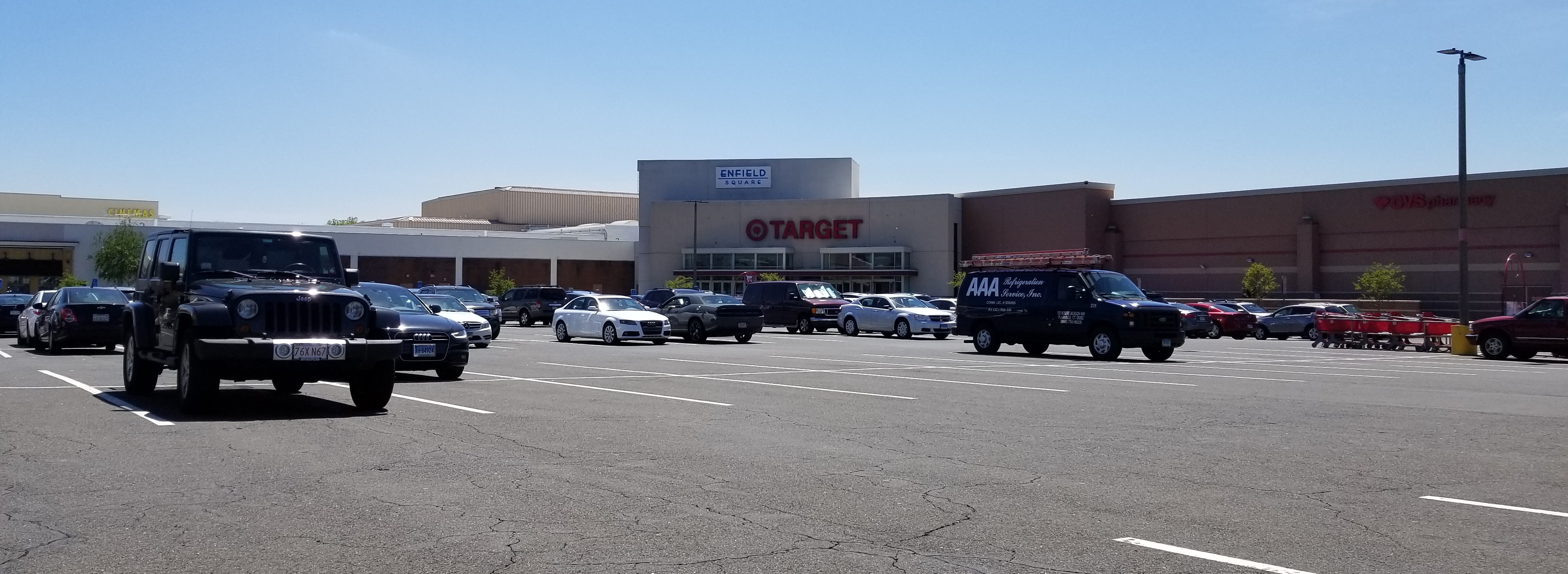
Exterior view of Enfield Square, May 2018

May Centers, Inc., the mall development branch of May Department Stores, built the Enfield Square Mall, which opened in 1971, with three anchor stores: G. Fox, JCPenney and Steiger's. In 1993, G. Fox was converted to a Filene's store as a result of a merger. Steiger's ceased operations at the east side of the mall in 1994 when the chain went out of business. In 1996, the owner of the mall, CenterMark Properties, was acquired by the Westfield Group.

On April 26, 1997, Sears opened in the space formerly occupied by Steiger's.

In 1998, the property, valued at $50 million, was transferred to Enfield Square LLC and was rebranded as Westfield Shoppingtown Enfield Square.

=== Decline and redevelopment ===
In August 2000, JCPenney closed as a result of a nationwide closing of unprofitable stores. The space remained vacant until Filene's expanded operations by moving its men's and home departments there in February 2001. Target built a new anchor on the north side of the mall in October 2001. In 2006, both of the Filene's stores were rebranded as Macy's after yet another merger. Additionally, the Westfield Group sold the property to Australia-based Centro Properties Group for $80 million, which its joint venture subsidiary Centro Watt (now Brixmor Property Group) managed the property. In 2012, Brixmor Property Group hired Madison Marquette to manage the Enfield Square.

In January 2016, Macy's announced they were closing both of the locations at the mall as a result of a nationwide closing of unprofitable stores.

In February 2016, J.P. Morgan Chase foreclosed on the mall after Brixmor Property Group (Centro Enfield LLC), defaulted on a $240 million loan taken out in 2006 for renovation purposes.

On August 7, 2016, the Ruby Tuesday location at the mall closed.

On December 28, 2016, Sears announced that it would close its Enfield Square Mall location in April 2017 as part of a plan to close 150 stores nationwide which left Target as the only remaining anchor store. Party City moved their Enfield location into the mall in 2017.

On April 25, 2017, Express announced that its Enfield Square Mall location would be closed on May 6, 2017.

In June 2018, KeyPoint Partners was chosen to manage the mall.

The property was sold by J.P. Morgan Chase through online auction company Ten-X.com on December 12, 2018, for $10.85 million, however, the buyer was not identified. On January 15, 2019, it was announced that the property was purchased by a group consisting of New York-based Namdar Realty Group, Mason Asset Management and Hakimi Global, Inc. Macy's retained ownership of the portion of the mall that the Macy's store formerly occupied on the west end of the mall.

On January 25, 2020, the Enfield Planning and Zoning Commission unanimously voted to approve Namdar Realty Group's proposal to resubdivide the property from 8 parcels into 13 as part of a redevelopment plan.

On April 2, 2020, Macy's sold its portion of the mall to Enfield Square Realty, LLC, which is controlled by Mason Asset Management.

On March 12, 2021, Namdar Realty Group sold the portion of the mall that Target occupies to 90 Enfield Square Holdings, LLC.

During the summer of 2022, the roof covering the former Macy's store collapsed. The Town of Enfield has stepped in to remediate this dangerous situation after numerous requests to the landlord have gone unanswered. A lien of $44,000 has been placed on the property to cover the cost of the work performed.

In May 2023, public safety personnel were conducting a training exercise inside the mall when a large breach in the roof was noted and reported to the Fire Marshall and the Chief Building Inspector. On July 14, The Town of Enfield, after more than two months of discussions with Namdar, warned tenants that if Namdar refuses to repair the breach in the roof, the entire mall, including the Target and the Cinemark theater, will be forced to shutter permanently, as it impairs the ability of the structure's fire sprinkler system to operate properly, posing a dangerous hazard towards the mall and therefore, making the mall unsafe to occupy.

On November 13, 2023, Cinemark announced it would be closing the Enfield Square Mall location on December 6, 2023.

In February 2025, Party City closed permanently due the company going out of business. Every Party City location, including Enfield Square, was liquidated.

In early January 2026, GameStop closed its store in mall.

=== Failed redevelopment as Enfield Marketplace ===
For years, Woodsonia Acquisitions LLC, planned to demolish the mall and redevelop it into a mixed-use community hub known as Enfield Marketplace, which will involve commercial space (restaurants and retail), hotels, and residential units. The zone changing that was necessary for redevelopment was unanimously approved in November 2025.

Demolition of the mall was expected to begin in the spring of 2026 following recent approvals; Target was to remain open during construction and become a standalone building. However, this deal fell through in January 2026, which now just leaves Enfield Square closed for the foreseeable future. Target remains as the only store open on the property as it is privately owned, as the mall itself sits in the dark.

=== 2026: Permanent closure ===
On February 5, 2026, Enfield Square closed "temporarily" due to a frozen sprinkler system that eventually burst, malfunctioning the fire alarms and causing the ceiling to partially collapse in the former Cinemark movie theater.

A later inspection confirmed the building unsafe due to a lack of heating. Since the mall is owned by Enfield Square Realty, a partnership that includes Namdar Realty Group, which is notorious for neglecting malls such as Pittsburgh Mills, many accuse the lack of functional HVAC as a consequence.

Although plans had been made to reopen the mall and undergo necessary repairs, these plans were ultimately abandoned around March, as noted in a letter to the remaining tenants, rendering the mall permanently closed.
