= The Crossings at Northwest =

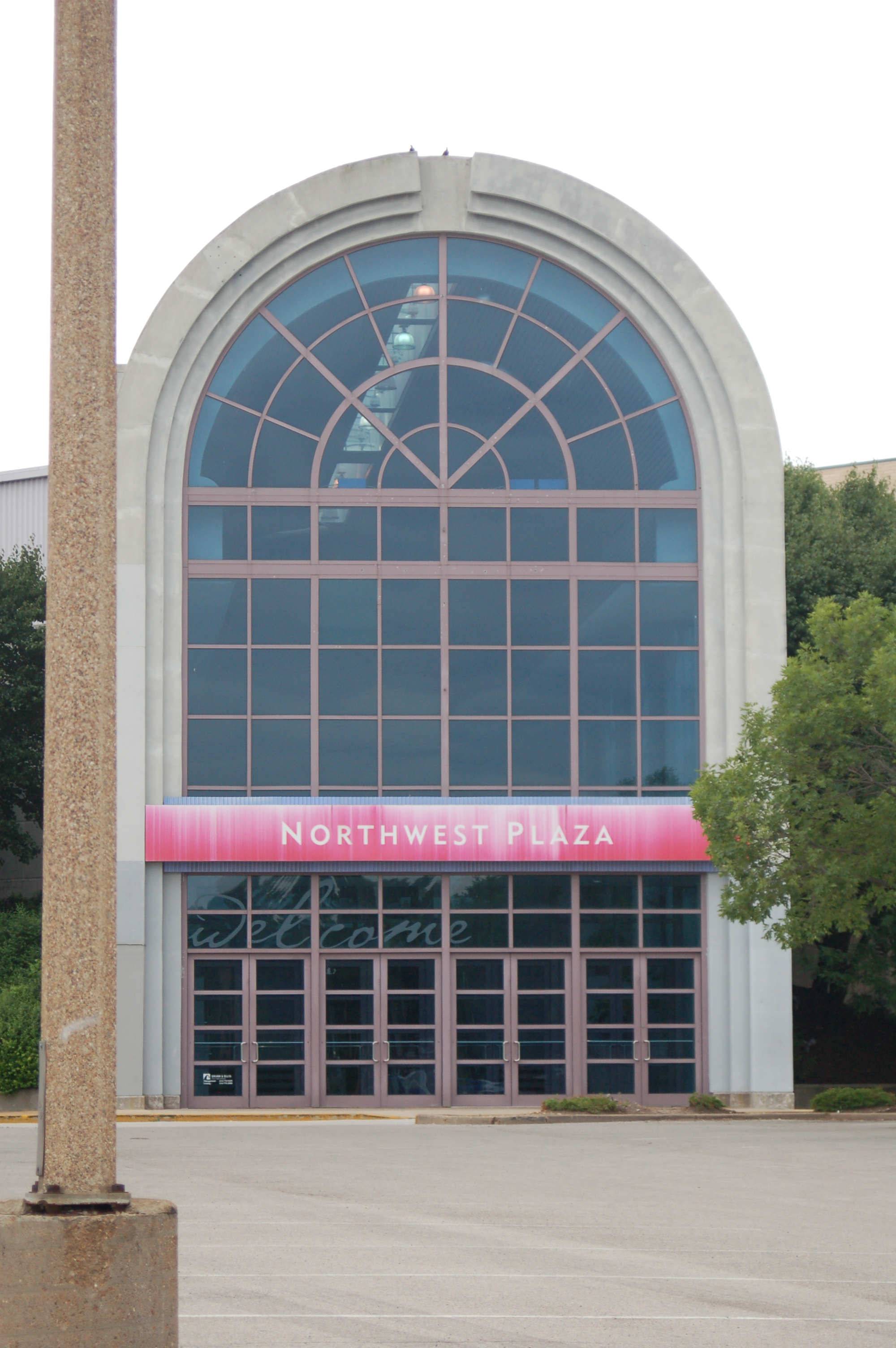
- Former entrance of Northwest Plaza
- Location: St. Ann, Missouri, United States
- Coordinates: 38°44′00″N 90°23′56″W
- Opened: 1963 (expanded and enclosed 1989)
- Closed: January 1, 2011
- Developer: Hycel Properties
- Manager: Grubb & Ellis
- Owner: St. Ann Shopping Center, LLC
- Num. of stores: 0 (210 at peak) inside, 10 along outer ring/parking lot
- Num. of anchor tenants: 0 (9 at peak)
- Floor area: 1,769,000 sq ft (164,300 m^{2})
- Floors: 1 in main mall area with partial lower level; Famous Barr 2; Sears, Dillard's, and JC Penney 3; Office tower 12
- Parking: 8910 free spaces in a single level parking lot
- Public transit: MetroBus

The Crossings at Northwest is a mixed-use commercial center containing 400,000 SF of retail and 500,000 SF of office uses located in St. Ann, a suburb of St. Louis, Missouri, United States. It was redeveloped from the old Northwest Plaza. The former mall comprised nearly 1,770,000 square feet (164,438.4 m^{2}) of gross leasable area, making it the 27th largest mall in the United States according to the International Council of Shopping Centers prior to its closure. With a total of 1.9 million square feet (180,000 m^{2}) of enclosed space, it was the largest enclosed mall in the state of Missouri. The mall featured nine anchor stores and more than 210 stores at its peak.

== History ==
=== Beginning ===
Northwest Plaza opened in 1965 as an open-air shopping center comprising 1,600,000 square feet of retail space. The developers were Louis Zorensky, Milton Zorensky and Saul Brodsky. At the time the mall opened, it was the largest mall in the world. It was anchored by Famous-Barr, JCPenney, and Sears. Junior anchors included local department stores Vandervoort's (opened in 1965) and Boyd's (an upscale apparel store), a Walgreens pharmacy, and a two-story Woolworth dime store. The Famous-Barr (later Macy's) store also featured a rotunda. In 1969, a 12-story 194,000 sq ft (18,000 m^{2}) adjacent office tower was added to the mall. Stix Baer & Fuller later joined the center between 1971 and 1983. When Vandervoort's closed, its building was leased by Famous-Barr to use as its home fashions store while the basement was leased to Venture Stores for office space. Dillard's acquired and re-branded all Stix, Baer & Fuller stores in 1984 including the River Roads Mall location in North St. Louis County.

=== Paramount ===
Paramount enclosed and expanded the mall in 1989, adding more than 200,000 square feet (18,580.6 m^{2}) of retail space in the process. The enclosed space contained nearly 2 million square feet (190,000 m^{2}), making it one of the largest malls in the country. The biggest change was remodeling the Famous-Barr home store/Venture office space into a mixed-use complex. A 40,000 square foot (3,716.1 m^{2}) Tilt! arcade, including an 18-hole miniature golf course, was opened in the basement, the main level became a 12-bay food court, and a 9-screen movie theater was added on the upper level, replacing a freestanding cinema complex in the mall's parking lot. Kids "R" Us was also added shortly after the mall's enclosure, and the large Woolworth store was shuttered in early 1989 when the mall terminated its lease. Phar-Mor and Oshman's Sporting Goods were added in the early 1990s. In 1993 Phar-Mor closed due to a corporate scandal that threw the company into bankruptcy. After a mid-1990s lull with occupancy dropping to 86%, an unorthodox approach revived the struggling mall increasing occupancy to 96%. Office supply store chain OfficeMax opened one of its first mall-based location at Northwest Plaza in 1997. Also, opening in 1997 was the area's first Dick Clark's American Bandstand Grill.

=== Westfield ===
Northwest Plaza was acquired in late 1997 by the Westfield Group for $111 million, who renamed the mall "Westfield Shoppingtown Northwest" (later shortened to "Westfield Northwest" in June 2005) to match the nomenclature of other malls in their portfolio. Under Westfield's tenure, the mall opened many new stores. Burlington Coat Factory moved into the former Oshman's, Schweig Engel Furniture moved into the old Phar-Mor, and many other stores: American Eagle Outfitters, and Bath & Body Works opened. Gap, which had closed in 1996, returned to the mall. By 1999, the occupancy rate had increased to 98%. Additional plans for renovation were made by Westfield Corporation, but these plans never got beyond the addition of family restroom and a children's play area. Around this time, Westfield instead focused more on driving customer business to other area malls such as West County Center in Des Peres and Mid Rivers Mall in St. Peters, in turn neglecting Northwest Plaza, along with its redevelopment and upkeep. The first major vacancy at Northwest Plaza was JCPenney in 2002. Northwest Plaza had the second lowest occupancy rate of a Westfield mall, which was just 79% at year-end 2004.

=== Somera ===
After years of continued decline, Westfield Corporation sold the mall in June 2006 to Somera Capital Management, LLC. After having bought the mall for $45 million, with General Growth Properties acting as third-party leasing and management agent, the mall's name reverted to Northwest Plaza. As per the Federated Stores/May Co. merger, Famous-Barr was re-branded as Macy's. Later in 2007, the Tilt closed for good.

Somera unveiled a redevelopment plan in which the mall would become Lindbergh Town Center. In the plan, a small part of the Macy's hallway plus the former Kids "R" Us would be turned into a lifestyle center. The Dillard's and the hallway between it and Sears would become a new anchor, plus the old food court/theater/Tilt would revert to an anchor. The remaining mall was to be renovated to feature a new "picnic inspired" food court (on the upper level of the former Woolworth's), new flooring, new paint, new skylights, a "Secret Garden" themed play area, and a feature coffee kiosk. After the foreclosure of Northwest Plaza in September 2009, Somera was no longer associated with the property.

=== Crime ===
After the expansion of Northwest Plaza, the mall developed a reputation for crime. Part of this was because of multiple fatal shootings that occurred at the mall. The first fatality was in 1990. There was a second shooting in 1994 inside the Famous-Barr store, which resulted in the death of a teenager. In 2006, the third shooting involved an off-duty police officer who fatally shot a man inside the mall.

=== Damage ===
The mall suffered from a leaking roof. Also, crumbling floor tiles in the north court caused by the leaking roof between the former Sears and Dillard's required it to be blocked off from foot traffic. The Tilt! arcade's 18-hole miniature golf course left behind after it closed was damaged beyond repair by vandalism, and subsequently the basement area was walled off. The food court which used to contain a 12-bay court, as well as the 9-screen cinema were also both walled off due to the extensive water damage.

== Decline ==
The anchor stores once included (even as of 2008) Famous-Barr (later Macy's), Steve & Barry's, Dillard's and Sears. Other anchors at one time included JCPenney and Burlington Coat Factory. Junior anchors included the Wehrenburg Northwest Plaza 9 screen cinema, Tilt! arcade, Office Max as well as Schweig Engel Furniture and Toys "R" Us (built on part of the mall's massive parking lot).

Northwest Plaza's highest grossing sales year was 2001. The early 2000s recession caused a small decline in the number of stores occupying Northwest Plaza. A rapid decline began in 2004, due to the increased competition from St. Louis Mills mall, which opened only 4 miles (6.4 km) away from Northwest Plaza. At the same time, the mall was suffering from lack of upkeep by then current owner Westfield. The mall's roof was examined under their ownership, and determined it needed to be replaced, among other things. Rather than the expensive rehabilitation of the mall, Westfield concluded it would not be cost effective, and decided to sell the mall entirely. When it was sold in 2006, Northwest Plaza had an occupancy rate of just 64%. Business continued to decline and when the late 2000s recession hit, most of the remaining stores vacated the mall. It was considered a dead mall by 2009.

JCPenney was the first anchor store to close in 2002. OfficeMax was the second to leave the mall, and remaining vacant for eighteen months before being replaced by 24 Hour Fitness. Burlington Coat Factory then left to move to St. Louis Mills mall, but it was soon rented out to Ford Motor Company. Schweig Engel Furniture closed in July 2004 when the company went bankrupt but it was briefly replaced with discount retailer US Factory Outlets the following spring before becoming vacant again. Furniture retailer IKEA had also planned to open a store at the mall, but later withdrew its plans. Also in 2004 there was the addition of a Retail Skills Center, which offered training and placement facilities for people seeking careers in retail, the first such center in the Midwest, and discount clothing retailer Steve & Barry's in the former JCPenney. At the time Steve & Barry's opened, it was the largest in the chain. The mall's movie theater complex closed for good in September 2005. Toys "R" Us left the mall in early 2006. The Tilt! arcade closed in the summer of 2007, moving most of their arcades to other stores, namely their newest location in St. Louis Mills, despite being rated as one of the top 3 arcades in the St Louis area in 2003. Steve & Barry's closed in 2008, a year before the company became defunct. In early 2009, Dillard's left.

Northwest Plaza entered foreclosure and was auctioned on September 1, 2009. The shopping center was purchased by the only bidder at foreclosure, St. Ann Shopping Center LLC, for $29.95 million. The Macy's store closed in March 2010 and the Sears store closed in July 2010, the final anchor stores to leave. The final store left in November 2010. This left the mall with no internal stores. As of January 1, 2011, Northwest Plaza's doors have been permanently locked. Public access to the building is no longer allowed, as the only stores remaining are contained in the mall's outer ring (with external entrances only) and parking lot. The office tower remains open, but with entrances to the mall blocked. The future of the mall is unknown, with the idea of a total demolition, and the entire lot renovated into an office complex is one of the main proposals.

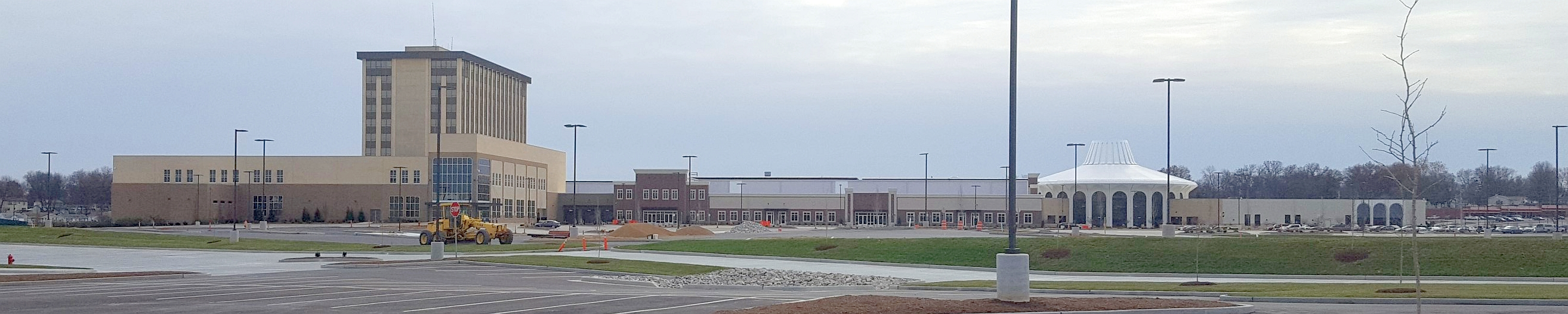
Northwest Plaza, 2016

== Redevelopment efforts ==
In March 2010, the St. Ann Board of Aldermen voted to select G.J. Grewe Development Co. of Crestwood, Missouri as the preferred re-developer of the mall. It is expected that the bulk of the mall will be torn down (although the current office tower could remain) and its 122-acre (0.49 km^{2}) site remade as a mixed-use development with offices and some retail. The developer was expected to work with Sears, the only remaining anchor at the time, to keep its store on the site, but not necessarily at the same location. In light of the closing of the Sears store, it is unclear how this will affect the redevelopment effort. The city of St. Ann holds a purchase option on Northwest Plaza that was set to expire on December 31, 2010.

There have been a number of people in the area who are calling for the redevelopment of the site, rather than having a very large empty building. Demolition of the mall is anticipated, as efforts to revive the mall have failed. The new plans call for a completely new complex. The only part of the mall expected to remain is the office tower. It is expected this new complex will contain both office buildings as well as condos.

As reported by the St. Louis Post-Dispatch on July 6, 2011, the distressed Northwest Plaza, with no internal stores which has an 8% overall occupancy, with the office tower less than 50%, was put up for auction online by current owner, a division of Wells Fargo for $1.25 million in an attempt to spark interest in the property. The property failed to meet expectations though, as the bidding fell short of the minimum price.

== Crossings at Northwest ==
Northwest Plaza was purchased by NWP LLC from St Ann Shopping Center LLC for $10 million in 2012. An approval of $33 million in TIF allowed for redevelopment of the center. The $106 million redevelopment of the 122-acre site began in 2012 with demolition of 1,000,000 square feet of the 1.8 million square foot mall, renovation of the office tower, and building big box stores, restaurants, and other outlot development. The demolition and completion of the project occurred in spring 2015.

The redeveloped property is named The Crossings at Northwest. Menards, a chain of home improvement stores in the Midwest, was announced as the first large retail tenant. The conceptual site plan calls for an additional 89,600 SF second anchor, two 30,000 SF Jr. anchors 26,000 SF of small shop retail and 10 outlots. Menards opened in August 2015. The former Macy's Department Store has been renovated and Charter Communications opened a $16 million call center in January 2016 occupying 135,000 SF. Tenet Conifer has leased an additional 48,000 SF in the renovated office tower. Ruler Foods has opened a 10,000SF location in the development. An 80,000 SF retail strip center opened in early 2017. Current tenants include Bob's Furniture, Edge Fitness Club, and Value City Furniture. Starbucks also opened an outlot location on site in 2017. Save-A-Lot food stores announced that they would be moving their corporate headquarters to the site from Earth City. Some 450 existing jobs along with 65 new positions will occupy 162,000 SF of space. Additionally, American Family Insurance leased 81,000 SF of space, relocating from an existing office in the Riverport area of Maryland Heights. St. Louis County leased 155,000 square feet in 2016 for a 20-year term for use as its Government Center Northwest. As of 2019, the redevelopment was home to about 4,000 jobs. In fall 2021, Discount Tire opened on the final outlot of the redevelopment. Other outlots were previously developed into Freddy's Frozen Custard & Steakburgers, Popeye's, Panda Express, Sherwin Williams, Raising Cane's, QT, the previously mentioned Starbucks, two retail strip centers containing First Watch, Sprint, Jersey Mike's Subs, GNC, and Cricket Wireless. One outlot containing a freestanding Jack-In-The-Box dates has been in operation since prior to the closure of the original mall.
