= Buzz Westfall Plaza on the Boulevard =

Shopping mall in Missouri

- Location: Jennings, Missouri, U.S.
- Coordinates: 38.729°N 90.275°W
- Address: 8023 West Florissant Avenue
- Opened: 1955
- Previous names: Northland Shopping Center (1955 – 2006)
- Developer: May Centers (Northland); Sansone Group (Buzz Westfall Plaza)
- Owner: Newport Capital Partners
- Num. of anchor tenants: 3 (2 open, 1 vacant)
- Floor area: 372,098 square feet (34,569.0 m^{2})
- Floors: 2 (Northland); 1 (Buzz Westfall)
- Public transit: MetroBus

Buzz Westfall Plaza on the Boulevard is a shopping center in Jennings, Missouri, United States. Opened in 1955 as Northland Shopping Center, it initially featured a Famous-Barr department store as its anchor store. Extensive redevelopment of the property began in 2005, resulting in a strip mall anchored by Schnucks and Aldi, with a vacancy last occupied by Target.

== History ==
=== Northland Shopping Center ===
May Centers, a subsidiary of The May Department Stores Company, which then owned the St. Louis, Missouri-based department store Famous-Barr, announced plans to build Northland Shopping Center in 1954. Under these plans, a four-story 325,000-square-foot (30,200 m^{2}) Famous-Barr store would be the central anchor store. At time of construction, this would be the biggest department store in the St. Louis area. By October 1954, several tenants had been announced for the center, including a local jewelry store, a beauty salon, and a dry cleaners. Famous-Barr opened for business on August 19, 1955. Edison Brothers Stores operated two shoe stores at Northland: Burt's and Baker's. By the end of the month, the center's second-biggest tenant had opened as well: an S. S. Kresge Corporation dime store.

A 1977 article in the St. Louis Post-Dispatch described Northland as "the first auto age shopping center in the metropolitan area" and noted that the center's revenues had allowed for construction of sewer lines to accommodate newer housing developments surrounding the property. A directory published that same year indicated over 50 shops, including Lerner New York (now known as New York & Company), Walgreens, Schnucks, Waldenbooks, RadioShack, Hickory Farms, Kinney Shoes, a bowling alley, and a movie theater.

In 1987, Kmart eliminated all stores in the S. S. Kresge division.

In July 1992, then owner CenterMark Properties (formerly May Centers, a subsidiary of May Department Stores), sold the ailing Northland Shopping Center to San Antonio-based Spigel Properties for an undisclosed amount, just a year before CenterMark was sold to a consortium headed by Des Moines-based General Growth Properties and also included Australia-based Westfield Holdings Ltd. and Whitehall Street Real Estate L.P. III, an investment partnership formed by Goldman, Sachs & Co. At the time of the sale of the shopping center to Spigel, Famous-Barr was in the process of opening a newer store in the nearby Jamestown Mall. By early 1994, the Famous-Barr store was found to be in a state of disrepair, with portions of the store partitioned off and non-functional bathrooms. Famous-Barr finally closed their store there in June 1994. Following the closure of Famous-Barr, the center grew increasingly vacant, and was purchased by Sansone Group in late 2000 for redevelopment. Demolition of the structures finally occurred in 2005 with the last business at the site closing in June.

=== Buzz Westfall Plaza ===
In 2006, the shopping center officially reopened as Buzz Westfall Plaza on the Boulevard after the complete demolition of the previous structures on the site. The first major tenant to open in the new complex was Target. Soon afterward, a relocated Schnucks grocery store was announced as the second major tenant. Sansone Group sold the shopping center to Chicago-based Newport Capital Partners in 2015. Target closed in 2016.
