= Alton Square Mall =

Coordinates: 38.923702°N 90.174905°W

- The mall's southeast entrance in September 2026
- Location: Alton, Illinois, U.S.
- Opened: November 15, 1978
- Developer: May Centers, Inc.
- Owner: Hull Property Group
- Architect: Wedemeyer Cernik Corrubia
- Num. of stores: 22 (including outparcels)
- Num. of anchor tenants: 2
- Floor area: 634,181 sq ft (58,917.3 m^{2})
- Floors: 2
- Public transit: MCT

Alton Square Mall is a 634,181 square feet (58,917.3 m^{2}) shopping mall located in Alton, Illinois. Its anchors are JCPenney and an 8-screen NCG Cinemas, which is located in a converted Sears anchor store. A third anchor store, formerly Macy's, was demolished in 2017.

== History ==
The mall was built by The May Department Stores Company and groundbreaking began in 1976. The Famous-Barr anchor store, a division of May, was the first portion of the mall to open, on October 16, 1978. The remainder of the mall, including the J. C. Penney anchor store, opened on November 15, 1978. It was later sold to May Centers, Inc., the mall development arm of May Department Stores. They subsequently sold it to CenterMark Properties Inc. of St. Louis, which sold it to Melvin Simon and Associates of Indianapolis in February 1993. A third anchor structure, Sears, was added during a renovation in 1997.

The Famous-Barr anchor store was converted to Macy's in 2006. Simon Property Group Inc. sold the mall to Coyote Management of Texas in 2007.

In 2009, a 10-screen Premiere Cinemas theater was announced for the mall, but it did not open.

Coyote Management sold the mall to NorthMarq Capital in 2010.

In April 2012, it was announced that Sears would close on June 3, 2012. Sears was converted to Illinois Wholesale Furniture, which also soon closed.

In 2015, NorthMarq sold the mall to Hull Property Group. That same year, a Ross Dress For Less store was added, along with Hibbett Sports.

In March 2017, Family Christian Stores closed, and Hull Property Group announced a redevelopment of the mall. The old Sears site would be made into a movie theater. Macy's, which also closed in 2017, was demolished, leaving JCPenney and Ross Dress for Less as the only anchor stores left. As part of the redevelopment, the smaller stores from the second level would be moved to the first level so they could have room for 5 anchor stores. In May 2017, the mall announced that Hallmark and Things Remembered would both be closing their locations inside the mall. On November 22, Vitamin World announced they would close all their St. Louis area stores, including the Alton Square Mall location. Over the years, the mall continued to struggle with store after store closing. In February 2019, Slackers CDs and Games announced it would be moving to the Christian bookstore's former space from elsewhere in Alton. In April 2021, the NCG Cinema was added in the old Sears space, becoming the third anchor of Alton Square Mall. In December 2024, The Cookie Factory closed its doors after 46 years of operation.
