= Mid Rivers Mall =

Shopping center in St. Peters, Missouri, U.S.

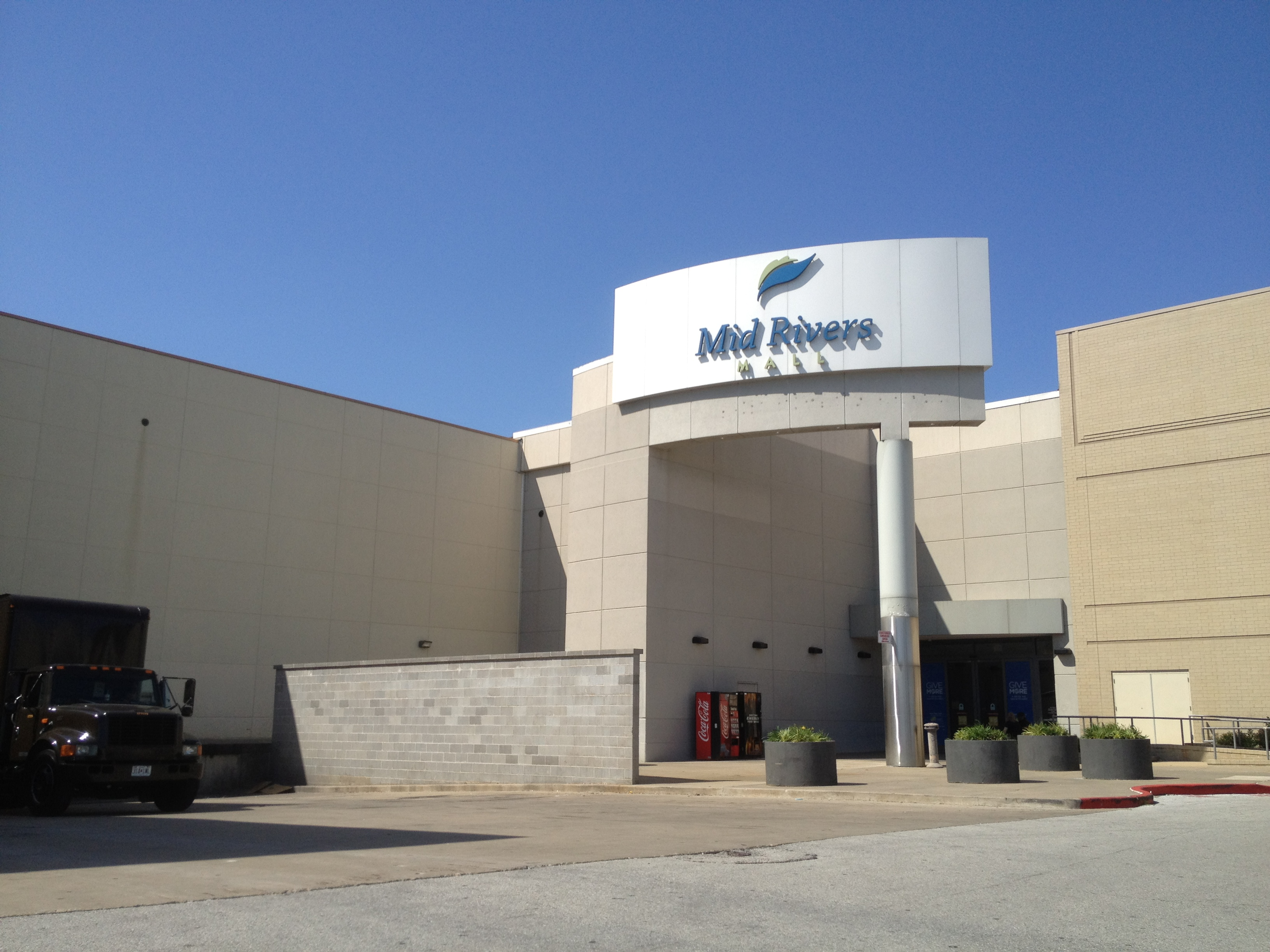
- Entrance to Mid Rivers Mall, May 2012
- Location: St. Peters, Missouri
- Coordinates: 38°47′45″N 90°37′0″W
- Address: 1600 Mid Rivers Mall Drive
- Opened: October 14, 1987; 39 years ago
- Developer: May Centers
- Owner: Stockbridge Missouri Investments, LLC
- Num. of stores: 140+
- Num. of anchor tenants: 8 (7 open, 1 vacant)
- Floor area: 1,089,190 sq ft (101,189 m^{2})
- Floors: 2

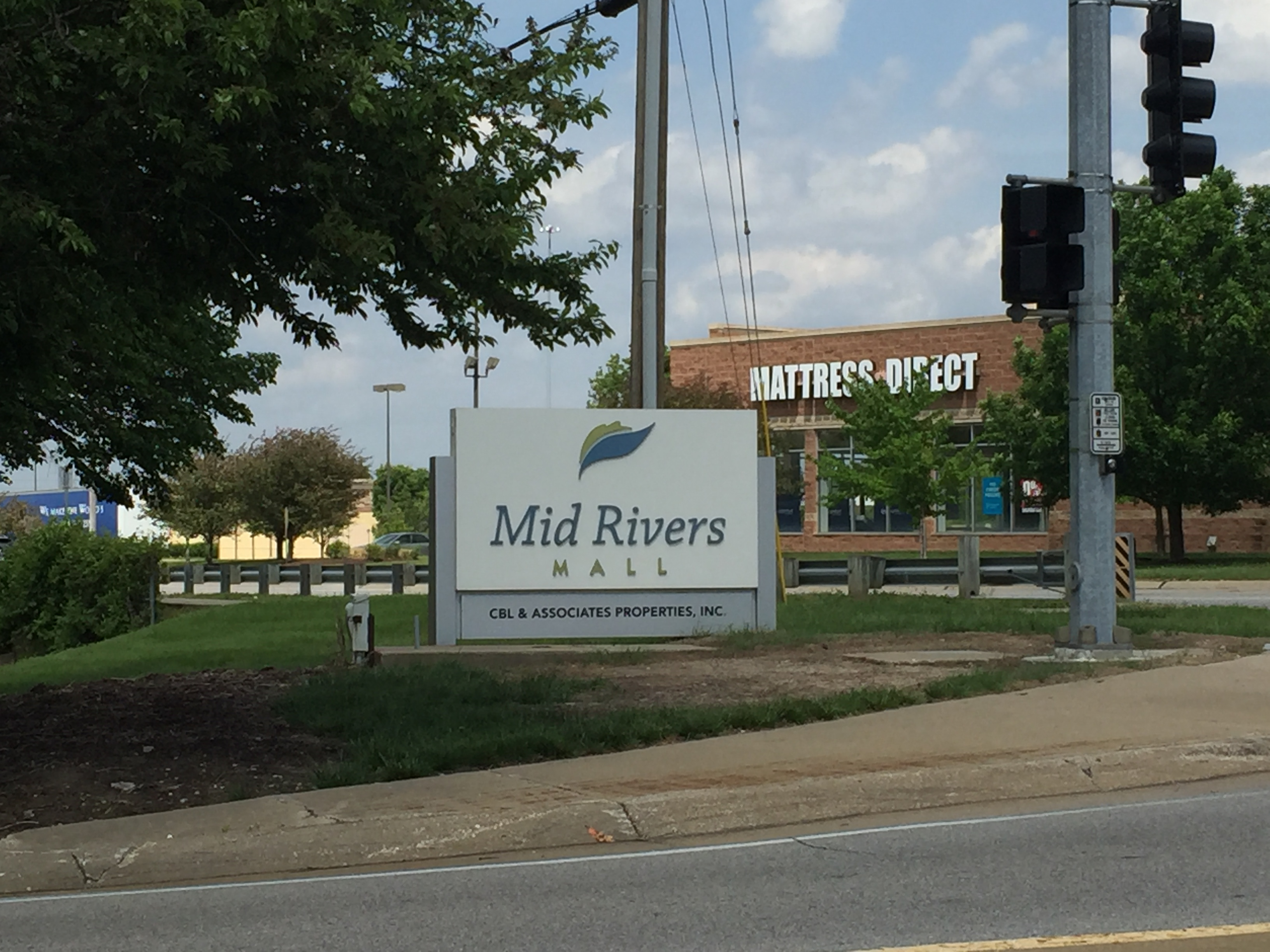
Entrance sign to Mid Rivers Mall, May 2018

Mid Rivers Mall (formerly Westfield Shoppingtown Mid Rivers) is a shopping center in St. Peters, Missouri, just off Interstate 70. The mall opened in 1987 and has since grown to be St. Charles County's largest shopping center. Mid Rivers Mall includes over 140 shops, including anchor stores Macy's, Dillard's, H&M, JCPenney, Marcus Theatres, Vintage Stock, and Dick's Sporting Goods. There is one vacant anchor store that was once Sears. The mall is owned by Stockbridge Missouri Investments LLC, who acquired the property in November of 2026.

== History ==
=== Famous-Barr ===
In 1976, Famous-Barr purchased 165 acres of the mall's present-day property, with its location near Interstate 70 and population growth in the surrounding St. Peters area. After opening in 1981, it marked the first major department store in St. Peters, where shoppers previously had to cross the Missouri River to find similar offerings. Soon after, plans for construction of the mall interior to connect to Famous-Barr were conceived.

=== Mall development ===
Famous-Barr opened their store in 1981 on the site of the future Mid Rivers Mall. The mall was finished in 1987 with two anchor stores, Dillard's and Famous-Barr, as well as a food court; a 6-screen cinema opened in 1988. The 1990 expansion of Mid Rivers Mall included a new anchor store, Sears. Another expansion of Mid Rivers Mall in 1996 added the fourth anchor, JCPenney, which moved from nearby Mark Twain Mall in St. Charles.

=== Westfield ===
Australian real estate investment company Westfield Properties acquired the mall in 1998, renaming it to Westfield Shoppingtown Mid Rivers. Shortly after the acquisition, in 1999, Wehrenberg demolished the mall's 6-screen theater and built a new 14-screen megaplex. Later that year, Chili's opened outside the mall. Best Buy then opened in April 2000. Upon the acquisition of The May Department Stores Company by Federated Department Stores, Famous-Barr was rebranded Macy's in 2006.

=== CBL Properties ===
In 2007, CBL Properties, a real estate investment trust based in Chattanooga, Tennessee, acquired the property from Westfield, renaming it back to Mid Rivers Mall.

Dick's Sporting Goods opened at the mall between JCPenney and Sears in 2008.

In February 2018, the mall began offering relatively inexpensive weekly lease rates so new retail businesses can test use of physical retail space. The initiative drives foot traffic to the mall while potentially bringing in long-term tenants. This same year the mall underwent renovation, with H&M opening, giving the mall another anchor store.

On August 6, 2019, it was announced that Sears would be closing this location as part of a plan to close 26 stores nationwide. The store closed on October 27, 2019, leaving Macy's, Dillard's, Marcus Theaters, V-Stock, H&M, JCPenney, and Dick's Sporting Goods as the remaining anchor stores.

=== Stockbridge ===
On November 19, 2026, CBL properties announced that Mid Rivers Mall would be sold to Stockbridge Missouri Investments LLC, a subsidiary of Stockbridge Enterprises. The sale was part of an effort by CBL to focus on core, high-margin properties, preceded by the sale of the Eastland Mall in Bloomington, Illinois, in October 2026.

== Crime and legal issues ==
In September 2017, the mall owner sued former tenant Max & Erma's, alleging that the franchisee owed over $680,000 in rent, interest, and fees after vacating their nearly 7,000-square-foot (650 m^{2}) mall space in August; its 2011 lease was to expire in January 2022.

In December 2017, a 59-year-old man was attacked and his vehicle carjacked late on a Saturday morning near the mall's Dillard's store.

In March 2018, Mid Rivers was reported as one of several St. Louis area malls at which a woman allegedly photographed young girls in bathroom stalls to share with a man. In July 2018, it was reported that a 33-year-old man had been charged with invasion of privacy after he was caught attempting to record a woman while she was in a dressing room at the mall's Windsor's Fashions store.

In July 2018, a shoplifting theft from a Mid Rivers Mall department store resulted in a high speed chase to St. Louis. In January 2020, two shoplifters drove over a police officer's foot while fleeing.
