= South County =

South County may refer to the following:

== Counties in the United States ==
- South County (Rhode Island), a vernacular name for Washington County, Rhode Island
- South County (Massachusetts), a region of Massachusetts
- South County, a name for the southern part of St. Louis County, Missouri used by residents of the Greater St. Louis area
- South County, a cultural and geographical area of Orange County, California
- South County, a name for the southern portion of Santa Clara County in California

== See also ==
- South County Airport, an airport in Santa Clara County, California
- South County Center, a shopping mall in Mehlville, Missouri
- South Dublin (UK Parliament constituency), a county constituency in Ireland from 1885 to 1922
- South County Secondary School, a school in Lorton, Virginia
