= St. Clair Square =

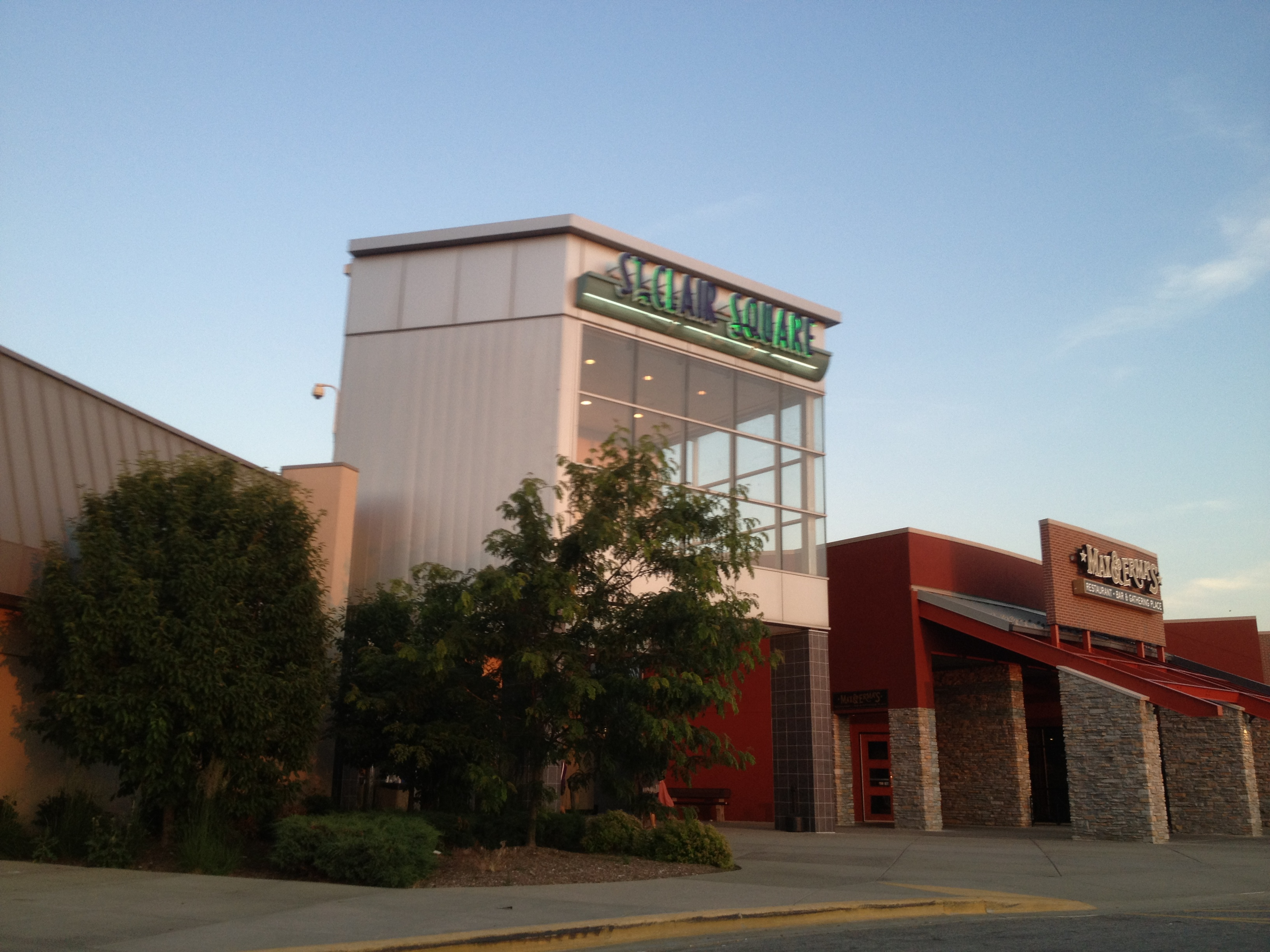
- St. Clair Square in 2012
- Location: Fairview Heights, Illinois
- Coordinates: 38.5961°N 89.9801°W
- Address: 134 St. Clair Square
- Opened: 1974
- Developer: May Centers, Inc.
- Manager: CBL Properties
- Owner: CBL Properties
- Num. of stores: 140
- Num. of anchor tenants: 4 (3 open, 1 vacant)
- Floor area: 1,084,898 square feet (100,000 m^{2})
- Floors: 2
- Public transit: St. Clair County Transit District
- Website: www.stclairsquare.com

St. Clair Square is a shopping mall in Fairview Heights, Illinois, United States. Opened in 1974, the mall features Macy's, Dillard's, and JCPenney as its anchor stores. It is managed by CBL Properties. The mall formerly had a Sears, which closed in 2019.

== History ==
The May Department Stores Company, through its subsidiary May Centers, Inc., built the mall in 1974 with Famous-Barr, JCPenney, and Sears. Stix Baer & Fuller built a store on the mall site in 1979. This store became Dillard's in 1984.

It was sold to The Hahn Company in 1989. A food court was added in the early 1990s. Hahn then sold it to CBL & Associates Properties in 1996. At the time, it was the fifth-largest mall in the St. Louis, Missouri metropolitan area. Famous-Barr became Macy's in 2006. The same year, the Dillard's store was expanded by 80,000 square feet (7,400 m^{2}).

On December 28, 2018, it was announced that Sears would be closing as part of a plan to close 80 stores nationwide. The store closed in March 2019.
