= Hastings Entertainment =

Defunct American retailer

- Type: Public
- Traded as: Nasdaq: HAST
- Industry: Entertainment retail
- Founded: 1968; 58 years ago, in Amarillo, Texas, United States
- Founder: Sam Marmaduke
- Defunct: October 31, 2016; 9 years ago
- Fate: Liquidation
- Headquarters: Amarillo, Texas, United States
- Number of locations: 123 (2016)
- Area served: Contiguous United States
- Products: Books, magazines, CDs, DVDs, software, video games, boutique, accessories, coffee
- Revenue: ▲$531,346,000 USD (2009)
- Net income: ▲$6,933,000 USD (2009)
- Number of employees: 3,850 (2016)
- Website: goHastings.com (archive)

Hastings Entertainment (also simply known as Hastings) was an American entertainment retail chain based in Amarillo, Texas. As of 2016 it had 123 superstores, which were mainly located in the South Central United States, Rocky Mountain States, and in parts of the Great Plains and Midwestern states. Hastings Entertainment stores were also located in many college towns in the U.S.

The company initially weathered the decline of video rental stores, outliving both Blockbuster Video and Hollywood Video. However, declining sales finally forced the company to shift its primary focus to collectibles and comic books in the 2010s. Through the early to mid 2010s, Hastings became the largest comic book retailer in the United States. While this strategy initially benefited the company, it ultimately suffered from a decision made during a mass expansion in the 1990s to lease all of its properties rather than purchase them, which lowered the business' overall value. Amidst ongoing rebranding, the company was sold to merchandising firm Draw Another Circle LLC in 2014 for $21.4 million (~$27.8 million in 2024). Hastings suffered under Draw's management, plunging the company $140 million into debt. In an effort to save the company, Draw Another Circle named Jim Litwak the president and CEO of Hastings in December 2015. Litwak had previously salvaged Macy's and Trans World Entertainment from near-bankruptcy in the 1990s and early 2000s, respectively,. However, this strategy did not save the company, and all stores were permanently closed by the end of October 2016.

== History ==
In 1968, the company was founded as West Texas News, a newsstand provider, later to become a division of Western Merchandisers, Inc., a books and music wholesaler. In 1990, Western Merchandisers became a subsidiary of Wal-Mart Stores, Inc. In 1994, Wal-Mart sold Western Merchandisers to Anderson Media Corporation, and the former Western Merchandisers then operated as Anderson Merchandisers.

On 7 March 2000, the company restated its earnings in the first three-quarters of fiscal 1999. On 14 March 2000, Hastings Entertainment, Inc. was sued for reporting profits of more than $12 million during the Class Period, while they used Hastings common stock to maintain false reports of the company's growth and profitability, by raising almost $40 million in an initial public offering. Hastings paid $5.75 million for settlement.

Despite the closure of other video rental stores such as Blockbuster and Hollywood video, Hastings initially thrived in the early 2010s due to a diversification of merchandise. In 2010, the company opened an account with Diamond Comic Distributors, making Hastings the largest direct market comic book retailer in the United States. The comic sections of all stores were expanded in connection with the Diamond account. The same year, the company opened up a sports equipment retailer called Sun Adventure Sport in Amarillo and later added a store in Lubbock, Texas. In August 2011, Hastings opened Tradesmart, a store in Littleton, Colorado, specializing in used electronics, media, and novelties.

In 2012, after years of losses and with more losses projected in the future, the company's directors decided to shop the company to potential buyers. In April 2014, Hastings agreed to be purchased by Draw Another Circle, LLC, a company controlled by merchandising executive Joel Weinshanker, for $21.4 million; another Weinshanker subsidiary had already owned 12.4 percent of Hastings. The buyout deal called for Hastings CEO John Marmaduke, son of the chain' founder Sam Marmaduke, to retire with a $1.5 million cash payment and for stockholders to be paid off at $3 a share. The purchase was completed in July 2014.

In 2013, Hastings redesigned its stores to emphasize toys, gifts, consumer electronics, musical instruments, disc golf, skateboards, hobby, and sport licensed and branded products, which had higher profit margins, as sales of books, music, and videos declined. The move also sought to combat the growing popularity of digital media, by emphasizing products which could not be downloaded.

In November 2014, Draw Another Circle—the parent company of Hastings Entertainment—purchased MovieStop, a 44-store regional chain in the southeastern U.S. that sold primarily used movies and related entertainment merchandise.

In June 2016, Hastings Entertainment filed for bankruptcy protection. Under Draw Another Circle's management, the company had suffered heavy losses, accumulating $140 million in debt. Hastings Entertainment was granted an extra week to find new investors or restructure the business as a franchise. Failing to find any interested parties, the company went up for auction on 20 July 2016. Although several businesses bid with the intention of continuing to operate Hastings, they were outbid when liquidation firms Hilco Merchant Resources LLC and Gordon Brothers Retail Partners LLC pooled their resources to outbid them. Rather than allow the few Hastings that were still profitable to continue operating, Hilco and Gordon Brothers opted to liquidate the entire company and closed all remaining stores by the end of October 2016. Calendar Holdings LLC, operator of calendars.com and the Go! calendar and game retail stores, purchased Hastings' intellectual property at auction for $300,000. One fan of the Hastings franchise, Mason Morgan, stated on an online video he contacted the Calendar Holding LLC to find out what they plan to do with the stores. He said they have yet to respond to any of his emails.

The number of retail stores in 23 states was about 150 a few years before bankruptcy with 3,850 employees.

Entertainment retailer Vintage Stock took over at least five former Hastings locations. In July 2017, 2nd & Charles took over the store location in Littleton, Colorado. In December 2017, 2nd & Charles took over the store location in Conroe, Texas.
