= Meriden Mall =

Coordinates: 41.5508°N 72.8035°W

- Location: Meriden, Connecticut
- Address: 470 Lewis Avenue, Meriden, Connecticut 06451 United States
- Opened: October 19, 1971
- Developer: May Centers, Inc.
- Manager: Mason Asset Management
- Owner: Namdar Realty Group
- Num. of stores: 140+ (at peak); 16 (as of July 2026)
- Num. of anchor tenants: 6 (3 open, 3 vacant)
- Floor area: 894,435 sq ft (83,095.7 m^{2})
- Parking: 4,065
- Website: www.meridenmall.com

Meriden Mall (formerly Meriden Square and Westfield Meriden) is a shopping mall located in Meriden, Connecticut. With nearly 900,000 square feet, Meriden Mall is Connecticut's seventh largest mall, and it once housed over 140 shops. The mall features Boscov's, and Furnish Cheap by Universal Hotel Liquidators as anchors, and Adventure Palace as a junior anchor.

== History ==
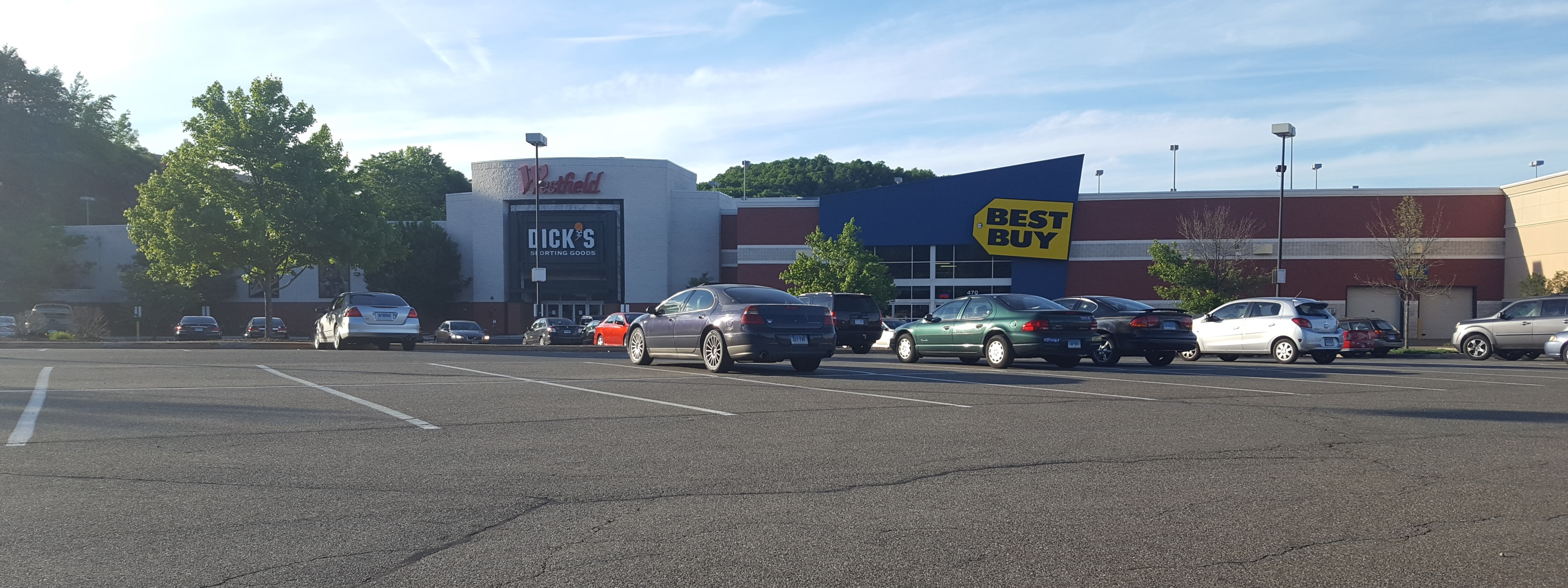
Exterior view of Meriden Mall, June 2016

The shopping complex, originally built and owned by The May Department Stores Company, opened in 1971. The original architecture was a two-level, dumbbell shaped shopping center with two anchor stores, Connecticut-based G. Fox, which was also owned by The May Company chain, and JCPenney. Original tenants also included Radio Shack, Spencer Gifts, Hickory Farms, Barricini Candy, Record World, Waldenbooks, CVS, a Singer sewing machine store, Bakers Shoes, Chess King, Child World Keyboard, a piano and organ store, a travel agency, Mall Liquor's, and C. B. Perkins tobacco store. The only restaurant in the main part of the mall was a Friendly's Ice Cream parlor and restaurant, though both JCPenney and G. Fox had in-house restaurants. The mall also featured an incline ramp-escalator in the center court.

A 1993 renovation added a two-level wing anchored by a new Sears department store and included a new food court, creating a T-shaped floor plan. Also in 1993, G. Fox parent, May Company, acquired Boston-based Filene's and merged the two department stores together under Filene's, thusly Meriden Mall's G. Fox was rebranded as Filene's.

The Westfield Group acquired the mall in 1997.

The mall was expanded again in an ambitious renovation announced in 1997. The renovation saw an extra floor area of 147,425 sq ft (13,696.2 m^{2}) added to the center, with an additional 30 stores, creating a cross-shaped floor plan. The new anchor, built opposite Sears, was upscale department store Lord & Taylor, the centerpiece of the $38 million revitalization and expansion plan. In addition to its new anchor, a multistory parking garage was built adjacent to Sears facing Lewis Avenue. The renovation was completed in 1999.

In 2005, Lord & Taylor shuttered their location due to repositioning. Westfield quickly moved to replace the vacancy with Dick's Sporting Goods.

During 2006, Filene's announced that all locations would rebrand as Macy's, including at Meriden Mall.

In 2014, Boscov's was announced as a replacement for JCPenney with an expanded and completely remodeled structure. The location was Boscov's first in Connecticut as well as the New England region. Boscov's opened in November 2015.

On November 8, 2018, it was announced Sears would close its anchor store.

On January 6, 2020, Macy's announced the closure of their anchor store.

In May 2020, Namdar Realty Group purchased the mall from Unibail-Rodamco-Westfield (formerly Westfield before Westfield was purchased and merged with Unibail-Rodamco out of Europe) and began operations as owners on June 1, 2020.

On September 21, 2021, Best Buy announced they would close their store, as a direct result of the COVID-19 pandemic.

On October 4, 2021, Yale New Haven Health bought the Macy's anchor to redevelop the site as a retail health center.

On March 20, 2024, it was announced that Dick's Sporting Goods would be closing by April 20, 2024. This left Boscov's and TJ Maxx as remaining anchors.

On March 7th 2026, TJ Maxx closed their store at the mall and relocated to The Shops at Stone Bridge in nearby Cheshire.

In May 2026, Furnish Cheap, a brand of Universal Hotel Furniture Liquidators, moved into the former Dick's Sporting Goods space. A new basketball training facility, known as The Half Courts, is currently under construction at the mall as of May 2026. It will be located across from Club Pickleball. Inside the facility will be basketball courts (with one on one training), weight training, and skills and fitness classes.
