= South County Center =

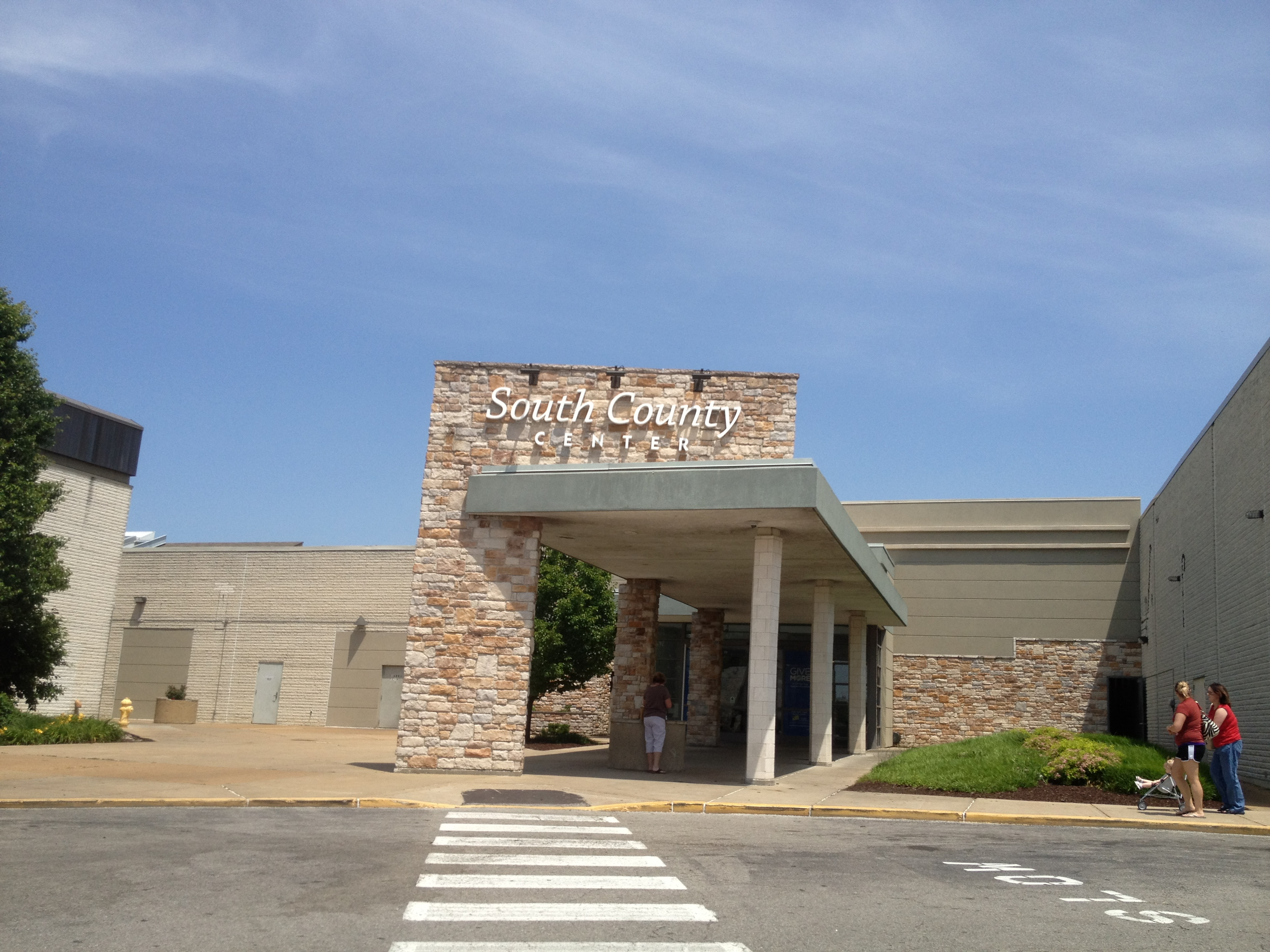
- South County Center in 2012
- Location: St. Louis, Missouri
- Coordinates: 38°30′22″N 90°19′54″W
- Address: 18 South County Center Way
- Opened: October 17, 1963
- Developer: May Centers, Inc.
- Manager: CBL Properties
- Owner: CBL Properties
- Architect: Victor Gruen Associates
- Num. of stores: 102 (As of January 2023)
- Num. of anchor tenants: 4 (2 open, 2 vacant)
- Floor area: 1,038,832 sq ft (96,510.7 m^{2})
- Floors: 1 in original wing, 2 with partial third floor in new wing (3 in former Sears)
- Public transit: MetroBus
- Website: shopsouthcountycenter.com

South County Center is a shopping mall located in Mehlville, Missouri, at the intersection between Interstate 55, Interstate 255, and U.S. Route 50. It opened on October 17, 1963 and was designed by Victor Gruen. It included a dome-roofed Famous-Barr, which became Macy's in 2006 (closed in 2025), a National Supermarket occupying the basement floor (closed in 1973), and later JCPenney as anchors. Stix, Baer & Fuller, (which became Dillard's in 1984), was added in 1973 along with a new wing of stores. A Sears, a food court, and additional mall stores were added in 2001. In 2004, several stores and restaurants were added that could be accessed from outside the mall including Qdoba, Applebee's (closed in 2015; replaced by DXL in 2016), Noodle's and Company (closed in 2023), and Borders (closed in 2011; replaced by Vintage Stock in 2012). The anchor stores are Dillard's and JCPenney.

In 1990, the mall was purchased by The Westfield Group, which retained ownership until 2007. CBL & Associates Properties, Inc. bought South County Center and three other Westfield malls as part of their expansion into the St. Louis area.

== History ==
South County Center was opened for business on 1963. The original anchors were Famous-Barr, National Supermarkets, and JCPenney. Ten years later, National Supermarkets was closed and was replaced by Stix, Baer and Fuller. Dillard's replaced Stix, Baer and Fuller in 1984. In 1990, the mall was purchased by the Westfield Group, which retained ownership in 2007. The CBL & Associates Properties, Inc. bought this mall and three other Westfield malls as part of the expansion into the St. Louis area. Sears was open for business in 2001. Junior anchors were added in 1969, starting with Pope's Restaurant, until it closed in 2001, which made way for the new junior anchors such as Destination XL, Vintage Stock, and many more. The Sears location in the mall closed in September 2018, along with the Sears location at what used to be the Chesterfield Mall.

A Dick's Sporting Goods store opened near the mall on November 8, 2013.

In May 2019, Japanese entertainment venue chain Round One Entertainment announced that a Round One venue would open in the currently vacant Sears store in 2020. The venue would've been the chain's first in the Greater St. Louis area, and the first in Missouri, but in January 2021, these plans were cancelled and the building plans were scrapped.

On January 9, 2025, it was announced that Macy's store would be closing as part of a plan to close 66 stores nationwide. The store closed on March 23, 2025. As of 2025, the entire second floor has been blocked off.
