= The Shoppes at Carlsbad =

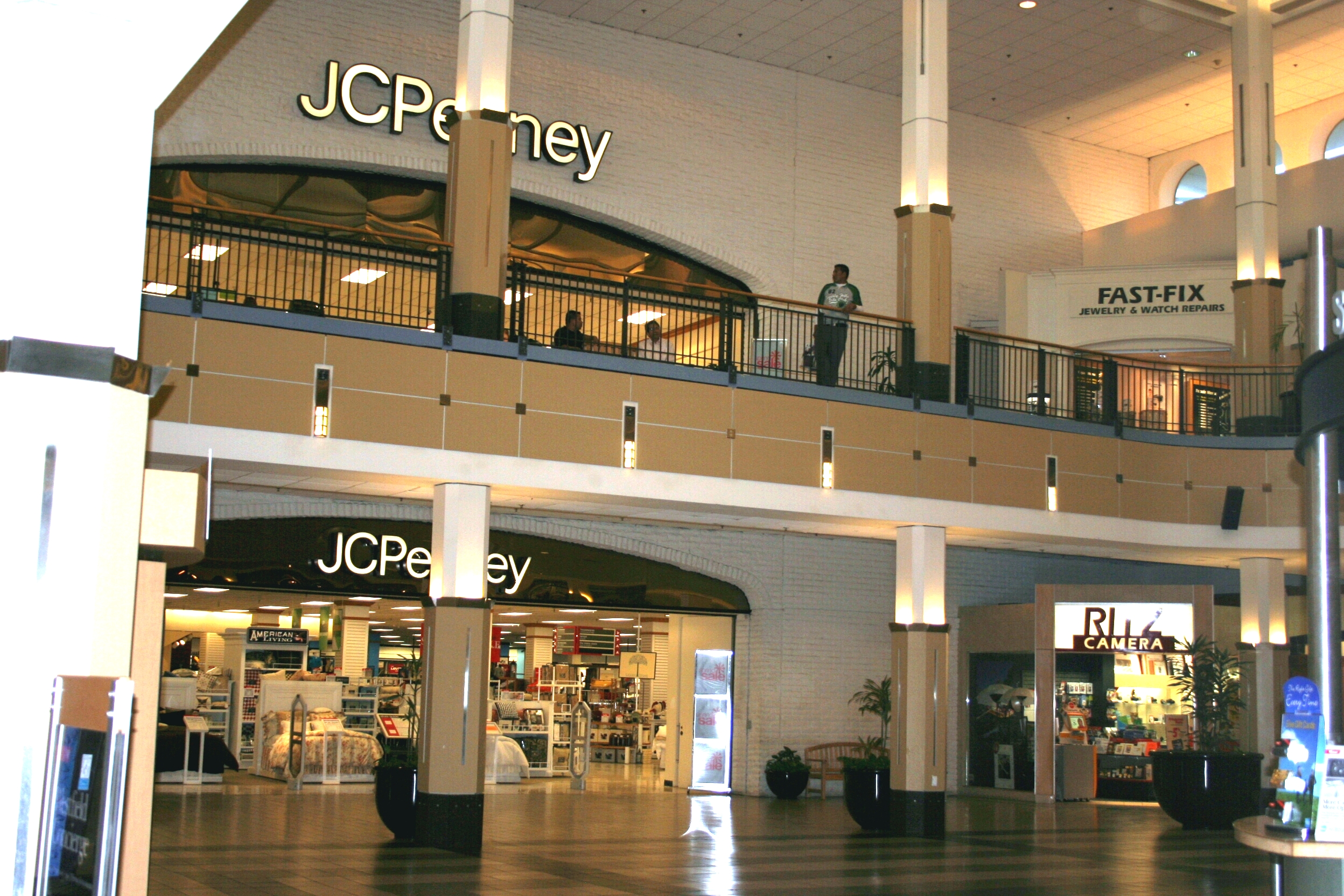
- The JCPenney courtyard inside Westfield Carlsbad (2009)
- Location: Carlsbad, California, United States
- Coordinates: 33.1782°N 117.3312°W
- Address: 2525 El Camino Real, Carlsbad, CA 92008
- Opened: 1969; 57 years ago
- Previous names: Plaza Camino Real (1969 - 1998) Westfield Shoppingtown Plaza Camino Real (1998 - 2005) Westfield Plaza Camino Real (2005 - 2013) Westfield Carlsbad (2013 - 2015)
- Developer: May Centers, Inc.
- Manager: Spinoso Real Estate Group
- Owner: Steerpoint Capital and SteelWave
- Num. of stores: 97 (at peak)
- Num. of anchor tenants: 4
- Floor area: 1.1 million ft²
- Floors: 2 (3 in both Macy's locations)
- Website: www.theshoppesatcarlsbad.com

The Shoppes at Carlsbad is a shopping mall in Carlsbad, California. The mall was originally named Plaza Camino Real when it was built in 1969, but was rebranded several times when it was a Westfield Holdings property (1994-2015). Its anchor stores are JCPenney and Macy's (in two locations), and Alternative Retail.

== History ==
=== 1969 launch ===
Opening as Plaza Camino Real, San Diego County's sixth mall was the first fully enclosed, regional-class shopping center in the metro area. At its dedication in 1969, Plaza Camino Real encompassed 548,000 leasable square feet, making it nearly three times the size of the region's first fully enclosed shopping complex, Escondido Village Mall (1964).

The 90-acre Plaza Camino Real site was located 32 miles north of San Diego's urban core. It extended along the southern side of the Vista Way / California Route 78 expressway, which had been dedicated in April 1962. Predominantly within the city of Carlsbad, the mall's parking area eventually included a small section in the city limits of Oceanside.

Plaza Camino Real was the second San Diego mall developed by May Centers. It was constructed in two phases, over a 10-year period. The first phase, featuring 63 stores, came inline in March 1969. Anchored by a 2-level (148,200 square foot) May Company California and 2-level (154,000 square foot) J.C. Penney, the mall structure consisted of two levels of retail and included an F.W. Woolworth on its Lower Level. There was also an outparcel movie house across Marron Road, the Cinema Plaza. It opened for business, in August 1969, as the first twinplex in San Diego County.

=== 1979 expansion ===
The second phase of Plaza Camino Real consisted of 500,000 leasable square feet. It was added to the west side of the existing mall, opening in 1979, and was anchored by a 3-level (152,000 square foot), Los Angeles-based The Broadway and 2-level (148,900 square foot) Sears.

An official dedication of the second phase expansion was held October 24, 1979. The third anchor of the addition, a 3-level (115,000 square foot), Los Angeles-based Bullock's, came inline October 2, 1980. With the newly completed enlargement, Plaza Camino Real encompassed 1,148,400 leasable square feet. The mall assumed the position as the largest shopping center in San Diego County with five department stores as anchors. It retained this distinction until Fashion Valley Mall was enlarged to 1,305,000 leasable square feet in 1981.

=== 1980s and 1990s ===
Shopping complex competitors in the North County suburbs were Escondido Village Mall (1964) and North County Fair (now known as Mershops North County) (1986), both in Escondido. The Forum lifestyle center, a competitor within the city of Carlsbad, was dedicated in 2003.

Plaza Camino Real was given a large-scale makeover during 1989, which included new tile flooring and escalators. A glass elevator was installed in the Penney's Court, along with innovative water fountains in front of the May Co. and Sears mall entrances. The Broadway Court was refitted with a unique mechanical clock.

Anchor rebrandings at Plaza Camino Real commenced with the conversion of May Company, to Robinsons-May, in January 1993. The Broadway was converted to a Macy's Women's Store in 1996. The Bullock's became a Macy's Men's and Home Store, in May 1996.

Meanwhile, in 1994, Australia-based Westfield Holdings had acquired the mall. They rebranded it as Westfield Shoppingtown Plaza Camino Real in late 1998, and then dropped the "Shoppingtown" reference in June 2005.

=== 2000s ===
Robinsons-May was shuttered in March 2006. Macy's was originally going to relocate its main store into the Robinsons-May space, but its first level became a Steve and Barry's University Sportswear in September of the same year. This store closed in late 2008. At this time, Westfield Plaza Camino Real housed 148 stores and services. The proprietors "down under" announced a plan for its revitalization in 2009, which ended up being delayed by the sour economy.

This project would have converted the vacant Robinsons-May / Steve & Barry's into a megaplex cinema. A "Dining Terrace" Food Court, new specialty shops and three freestanding restaurants would also be built. Moreover, the circa-1980s interior and exterior would have been given a much-needed upgrade. Work was scheduled to get underway in early 2011.

However, Westfield delayed remodeling its Plaza Camino Real property and invested heavily in the renovation of two other San Diego shopping hubs, namely Westfield UTC (University Towne Centre) (1977) in San Diego and the aforementioned Westfield North County (now known as Mershops North County).

=== 2010s ===
In January 2013, Westfield announced plans for a long-delayed renovation of the Plaza Camino Real property. The vacant May Company / Robinsons-May structure was to be renovated by San Ramon, California-based 24 Hour Fitness, who would refit 40,000 square feet as a Super-Sport club. This was to include a basketball court, state-of-the-art training area, lap pool and exterior aquatic area. The remainder of the old Robinsons-May structure would be rebuilt as a 12-screen Regal Cinemas multiplex. As part of the makeover from an indoor mall to an outdoor mall, Westfield Plaza Camino Real was being rebranded as Westfield Carlsbad.

In November 2015, Westfield sold Westfield Carlsbad to New York City-based Rouse Properties for $170 million who renamed the development as The Shoppes at Carlsbad. However, Rouse Properties was acquired by Brookfield Properties in 2016.

On August 31, 2019, it was announced that Sears would be closing this location a part of a plan to close 92 stores nationwide. The store closed on December 15, 2019.

Sometime after Sears closed, the space was sold to another retailer called Alternative Retail who took over the anchor space. Alternative Retail now sells clothing and other merchandise at a discounted price.

=== 2020s ===
The previous owner, Brookfield Properties, sold the mall to Steerpoint Capital and SteelWave for $71.5 million in September 2025. Spinoso Real Estate Group handles management of the mall.

In 2026, Picklr, an indoor pickleball franchise, announced that they would be opening the Pickleball Club of Carlsbad. Pickleball Club of Carlsbad will be a 36,300 square foot (3372.4 m²) facility, and is expected to have 10 indoor courts, a pro shop, a private event space, and instructional programs. The facility is projected to open in August 2026.
