= MovieStop =

Retailer of new and used movies

- Type: Private
- Industry: Retail
- Founded: 2004; 22 years ago
- Defunct: October 31, 2016; 9 years ago
- Number of locations: 44 (2014)

MovieStop was a retailer of new and used movies and related merchandise. It was founded in 2004 as a division of GameStop. GameStop spun off MovieStop to private owners in 2012. In November 2014 MovieStop was purchased by Draw Another Circle LLC, the parent company of Hastings Entertainment. The company website was folded into GoHastings.com the next year. As of November 2014, MovieStop operated 44 stores in 10 U.S. states. All stores were closed by October 31, 2016 as part of Hastings' liquidation.
