= Jamestown Mall =

Demolished shopping mall in Florissant, Missouri, United States

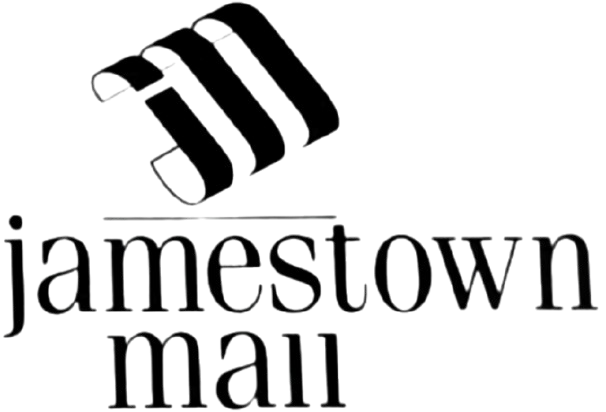

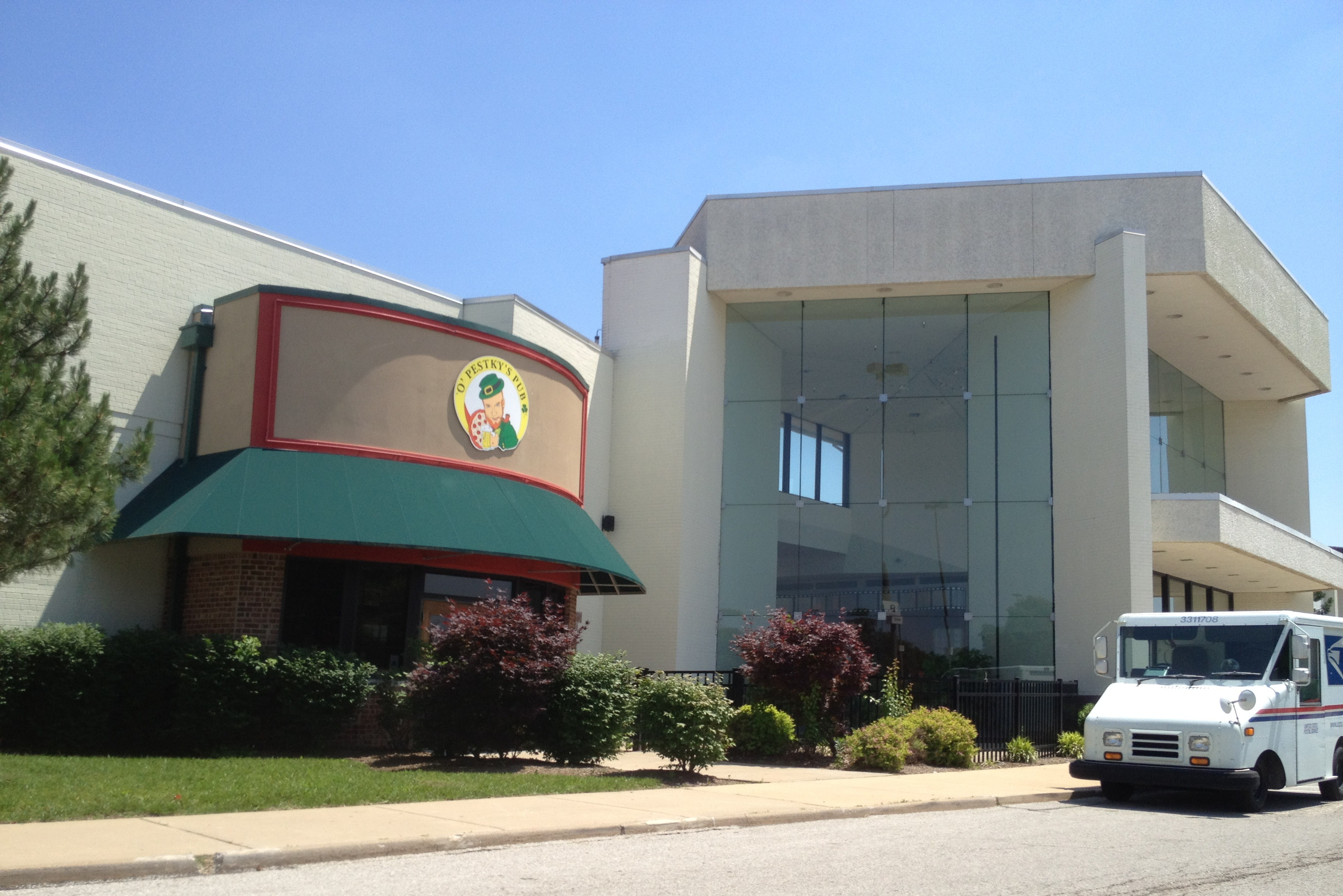
- Jamestown Mall in 2012
- Location: Florissant, Missouri, U.S.
- Coordinates: 38°49′12″N 90°14′50″W
- Address: 175 Jamestown Mall
- Opened: 1973; 53 years ago
- Closed: July 1, 2014; 12 years ago (demolition began on September 26, 2023)
- Developer: Richard E. Jacobs Group
- Owner: St. Louis County Port Authority
- Num. of stores: 100+
- Num. of anchor tenants: 4
- Floor area: 1,250,000 sq ft (116,000 m^{2})
- Floors: 1 (2 in former Macy's, former Sears, and former JCPenney, 4 in former Dillard's)

Jamestown Mall was an enclosed shopping mall in Florissant, Missouri, a suburb of St. Louis, Missouri, United States. Opened in 1973, the mall formerly included Dillard's, JCPenney, Macy's, and Sears as its anchor stores. The mall had become increasingly vacant since the beginning of the 2000s. It closed in July 2014 and was demolished from 2023 to 2024. The site has been slated for redevelopment as an open-air center.

== History ==
=== Early years ===
Construction began on the mall in 1972. Its anchor stores at the time were Sears and Stix Baer & Fuller, a local chain based in nearby St. Louis. The mall's initial roster of stores and services included Forum Cafeteria, Walgreen Drug, Baskin-Robbins Ice Cream, Camelot Music, Davy Jones Locker, The Limited, Orange Bowl snack bar, Pass Pets, and an Aladdin's Castle video arcade. On July 12, 1974, a theater owned by the General Cinema Corporation opened at Jamestown Mall.

The Stix Baer & Fuller store at Jamestown Mall was converted to Dillard's in 1984, after Dillard's acquired the chain. In 1994, Famous-Barr (later Macy's) became a third anchor, and JCPenney relocated from Florissant to the mall. Famous-Barr had announced plans for a new store in April 1992, and construction began in late 1993, with the grand opening on July 30, 1994. This new store, spanning 164,500 square feet over two levels, replaced a circa-1955 operation at Jennings' Northland Center. Additionally, a movie theater was added in the 1990s.

During the 1990s, the mall's movie theater was relocated from its original location, which later housed the food court, to the front of the mall. The cinema was owned and operated by Wehrenberg Theatres. In 1999, J.C. Penney demoted their full-line operation to an Outlet Store. The mall's Famous-Barr was rebranded as Macy's in September 2006.

=== Decline ===
Jacobs Group sold the mall to Carlyle Development Group in 2003. At the time, the complex was approximately 30 percent vacant. In April 2006, Dillard's Inc. announced the closure of the Jamestown Mall store.

In 2008, Carlyle announced ambitious redevelopment plans for the mall, intending to convert the former Dillard's into offices and close its retail wing. The Sears store closed early in 2009, prompting St. Louis County to commission researchers from the Urban Land Institute to assess the mall's viability. The study revealed that the center overlapped with existing retailers, making it nonviable as a shopping mall.

Despite these findings, the initial redevelopment plans faced a setback in 2009 when the developers lost financial support from the county following an unsuccessful attempt to auction the former Dillard's store. Subsequent plans in 2010 aimed to demolish everything except the JCPenney and Macy's stores, envisioning a mixed-use center.

In June 2011, Central States Liquidation opened in the former Dillard's space. However, the JCPenney Outlet store, later renamed JC's 5 Star Outlet, closed in late 2013. In 2009, amid financial challenges, Kohan purchased the mall for $3.3 million. Despite these ownership changes, the 2010 plans reiterated the intent to demolish everything except JCPenney and Macy's, with the goal of redeveloping the complex into a mixed-use center.

In late 2011, Kohan lost ownership of Jamestown Mall due to foreclosure but retained some ownership in late 2012. The mall had previously declared bankruptcy in August 2011. Subsequently, Carlyle reclaimed ownership of the mall. In late 2012, gas service to the mall was shut off but later restored.

=== Closure and demolition ===
The mall's closure was announced on Thanksgiving Eve in November 2013 due to the heat being shut off. The closure of the Macy's store was announced in January 2014, leaving the mall with no anchors. Jamestown Mall closed on July 1, 2014. Among the last remaining tenants were Foot Locker and LensCrafters.

In December 2017, Carlyle sold the mall to the St. Louis Port Authority with the intention of demolishing the mall and embarking on a complete redevelopment of the site. However, those plans never materialized as expected. The Port Authority permitted scrappers to access the site with the assumption that demolition would take place, but it never did. Consequently, the mall began to deteriorate rapidly.

In June 2020, firefighters entered the building and discovered large piles of furniture on fire, with heavy smoke emanating from Dillard's and Macy's inside the mall.

In October 2021, a portion of the shuttered Jamestown Mall in north St. Louis County faced a new challenge as burst pipes flooded the first floor of the Sears building. It remains unclear when the water and fire suppression lines at the Sears building broke, and the extent of the water release is still unknown.

In April 2022, St. Louis County approved a $6 million demolition plan to demolish the mall.

In April 2023, a fire broke out in front of the entrance to Dillard's inside Jamestown Mall, which resulted in a hole being left in the roof of the building. The fire caused significant damage to the surrounding area, and there were reports of smoke and water damage inside the mall as well. Fortunately, no one was injured in the incident. In September 2023, nearly a decade after its closure, St. Louis County finally initiated an announcement that demolition would begin on the former Jamestown Mall effective September 26, 2023, with a ceremony being hosted at the mall's site that same day. Demolition of all structures on the property was complete by March 2024. The future site is to be redeveloped.

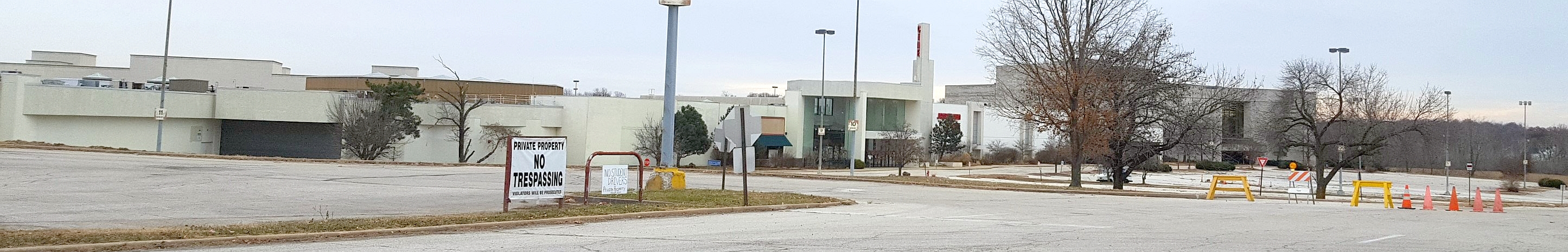
Jamestown Mall, 2016
