= Brixmor Property Group =

American real estate trust

Brixmor Property Group Inc.
- Formerly: Centro Watt (2003–2007); Centro Properties Group US (2007–2011)
- Type: Public company
- Traded as: NYSE: BRX; S&P 400 Component; Russell 1000 Index Component
- Industry: Real estate investment trust
- Founded: 2003; 23 years ago (as Centro Watt)
- Headquarters: 450 Lexington Avenue; New York City
- Key people: James M. Taylor, CEO & President; Sheryl M. Crosland, Chairman; Steven T. Gallagher, CFO
- Products: Shopping centers
- Revenue: ▲$1.285 billion (2024)
- Net income: ▲$339 million (2024)
- Total assets: ▲$8.908 billion (2024)
- Total equity: ▲$2.983 billion (2024)
- Number of employees: 454 (2024)
- Website: www.brixmor.com

Brixmor Property Group is a publicly traded real estate investment trust that invests in shopping centers.

As of December 31, 2024, the company owned 363 shopping centers containing 64 million square feet of retail space. The company's largest markets are Florida (14.0% of revenues), Texas (11.9% of revenues), and California (11.7% of revenues). The company's largest tenants are TJX Companies (3.3% of revenues), Kroger (2.3% of revenues), and Burlington (2.1% of revenues).

== History ==
In late 2003, Centro Properties Group, an Australian shopping center firm, and American-based Watt Commercial Realty formed Centro Watt, a joint venture, and acquired 14 shopping centers in California for $488 million.

In 2005, Centro acquired Kramont Reality Trust for $1.2 billion. In May 2006, Sydney-based Westfield Group sold seven shopping centers to Centro Watt. In 2007, Centro acquired Watt Companies' ownership stake, ending the joint venture, and renamed the company Centro Properties Group US.

In 2011, The Blackstone Group acquired Centro Properties Group US from Centro Retail Trust, and the entity changed its name to Brixmor. In 2012, the company hired Madison Marquette to manage 7 centers that were acquired from Westfield Group. In October 2013, the company became a public company via initial public offering.

In April 2016, president and CEO Michael Carroll, CFO Michael Pappagallo, and chief accounting officer Steven Splain resigned after an accounting scandal. Jim Taylor was named CEO and president.

In August 2016, The Blackstone Group sold its stake in the company.
