= Vintage Stock (retailer) =

American entertainment retailer

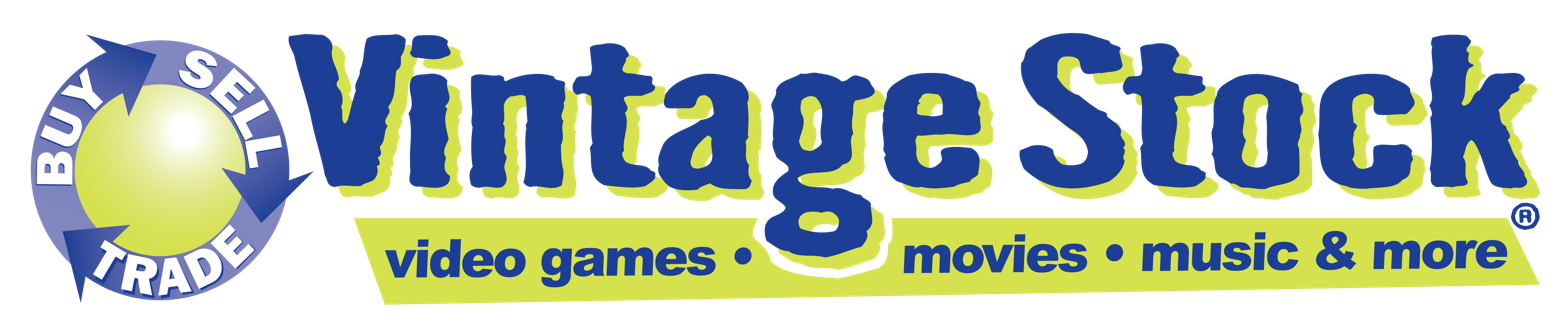
- Industry: Electronics and Comic Book stores
- Founded: 1980 (as The Book Barn) in Joplin, Missouri
- Headquarters: Joplin, Missouri, U.S.
- Number of locations: 70
- Key people: Rodney Spriggs (President), Steve Wilcox (Vice-President), Ken Caviness (CFO)
- Products: Music, Movies, Video Games, Comic Books, Posters, Toys and Trading Cards
- Number of employees: 300+
- Website: www.vintagestock.com

Vintage Stock is an American entertainment retailer. The company, headquartered in Joplin, Missouri, operates 70 retail stores throughout the United States. Retail stores operate primarily under the Vintage Stock name, as well as the Movie Trading Company/ Movie Trading Co. name (MTC stores are the Dallas, Texas, division of Vintage Stock, formerly owned by Blockbuster) and the V-Stock name in the St. Louis, Missouri, area. Vintage Stock buys and sells video games, DVDs, CDs, LPs, comic books, toys, trading cards and other related merchandise. The retailer typically occupies previously used store spaces.

Vintage Stock took over EntertainMART retail stores in Springfield, Missouri, in 2013 and Colorado Springs, Colorado, in 2016. Movie Trading Co. occupies the former location of Hastings Entertainment in Denton, Texas. In November 2016, Vintage Stock took over another seven locations (most of which operate under the EntertainMART brand) after Hastings Entertainment went out of business. In May 2017, Vintage Stock opened another EntertainMART in an eighth former Hastings Entertainment location. In November 2018 and May 2019, Vintage Stock opened 2 more EntertainMART stores in former Hastings markets of Tyler, Texas, and Wichita Falls, Texas.
