= Madison Marquette =

Real estate company in Washington

Madison Marquette Real Estate Services
- Industry: Real estate investments
- Genre: Mixed-Use Projects; Office; Retail; Multi-Family; Senior Housing; Medical; Industrial; Land
- Founded: 1992
- Headquarters: Washington, D.C., U.S.
- Number of locations: 330
- Number of employees: 600
- Website: madisonmarquette.com

Madison Marquette Real Estate Services is a Washington D.C.-based investor, developer and operator of mixed-use real estate. Madison Marquette provides investment management, development, leasing and property services to a diverse portfolio of 330 assets in 20 states and manages an investment portfolio valued at over $6 billion.

Madison Marquette has 14 offices in cities like New York, Boston, Philadelphia, Charlotte, San Francisco, Los Angeles, Seattle, San Diego and Fort Lauderdale, as well as overseas, with more than 23 million sq. ft. of retail, lifestyle and mixed-use space across 63 different properties. It manages various commercial, residential and entertainment properties. Its clients are concentrated in metropolitan areas on the East and West Coasts; California, Florida, and New Jersey being its primary markets. The company also performs development and management services, while tenant representation and leasing are handled by its Madison Retail Group affiliate.

Madison Marquette Real Estate Services is privately owned and currently has more than 600 employees.

It is also the publisher of the retail real estate industry magazine "PLACES Magazine."

== History ==
Madison Realty Partnership was founded in 1992 in Washington D.C. as a niche retail developer by Capital Guidance investment firm. In 1995, Madison Realty Partnership acquired and merged with Minneapolis-based property management firm Marquette Partners to create Madison Marquette. In 1997, it became Madison Marquette Retail Services, adding property management, leasing capabilities, marketing and property development to its services offered.

In 2002, Madison Marquette established its national headquarters in Washington D.C. In recent years, Madison Marquette has acquired and merged with commercial real estate partners including Capital Growth Properties, Hollis & Associates, and more. In 2012, Madison Marquette was hired by Brixmor to be the manager for seven shopping malls.

Recent acquisitions and projects include Mercato in Naples, Florida; The Wharf in Washington D.C. which will include a lighting overhaul of the Case Bridge; and the purchase of Pacific Place in Seattle, Washington. Recent repositioning of centers includes the rebranding of University Mall in Chapel Hill, North Carolina to University Place.

In 2018, Madison Marquette merged with PM Reality Group (PMRG), one of the nation’s premier privately held commercial real estate firms specializing in project leasing, property management, investment management and development services.

July 15, 2019, Madison Marquette merged operations with the Boston-based Roseview Group, adding capital markets and corporate advisory capabilities to the platform. Roseview's Vince Costantini assumed the role of Chief Executive Officer and Chief Investment Officer.
