= Famous-Barr =

Department store in Missouri, US

The Famous-Barr Co.
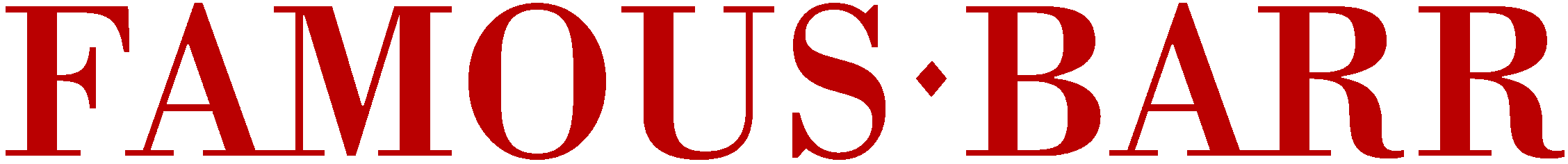
- Industry: Retail
- Founded: 1911
- Founder: David May
- Defunct: September 9, 2006
- Fate: Acquired by Macy's
- Successor: Macy's
- Headquarters: St. Louis, Missouri
- Products: Clothing, footwear, bedding, furniture, jewelry, beauty products, and housewares.
- Parent: The May Department Stores Company (1911–August 30, 2005); Federated Department Stores, Inc. (August 30, 2005–September 9, 2006)
- Website: Archived official website at the Wayback Machine (archive index)

The Famous-Barr Co. (originally Famous and Barr Co.) was a division of Macy's, Inc. (formerly Federated Department Stores). Headquartered in St. Louis, Missouri, in the Railway Exchange Building, it was the flagship store of The May Department Stores Company, which was acquired by Federated on August 30, 2005. On February 1, 2006, it was subsumed into the newly created Macy's Midwest division.

== History ==
Cursive logo used throughout the 70s and 80s

The company can be traced back to Motte's, a store founded in 1874 by Jesse W. Motte, who sold boots and shoes at 714 Franklin Street. In 1876, Motte took on as business partner his store's supervisor, Joseph Specht. The two added clothing to their wares, and presently moved the store to 703–705 Franklin, where it was listed in the city directory as Famous, Motte & Specht. It was more popularly known as the Famous Clothing Company — "famous" reportedly coming from the public's referring to the store as the "famous place for bargains".

Retailer David May acquired the Famous Clothing Store in 1892. Sometime later, he acquired William Barr Dry Goods Co. In 1911, he merged the two to create Famous-Barr.

Famous-Barr was one of many St. Louis retail companies that owned a resort along the Meramec River between the early 1900’s to 1940’s.

In 1914, David May opened a new Famous-Barr department store in downtown St. Louis, the first air-conditioned department store in the country.

On October 8, 1948, Famous-Barr opened its first branch store in Clayton, Missouri, at the intersection of Forsyth and Jackson.

In 1955, Famous-Barr opened another branch store, at the Northland Shopping Center in Jennings — a mall owned by Famous-Barr's corporate parent, the May Companies. The Northland store celebrated its 25th anniversary in 1980.

In 1991, it took operational control of the L.S. Ayres division in Indiana, and in 1998 took on The Jones Store in Kansas City when May acquired that chain in the aftermath of the Dillard's acquisition of Mercantile Stores Co. Both chains retained their names, but closed their headquarters.

The Famous-Barr name was retired on September 9, 2006, when Federated converted most of Macy's regional department stores to the Macy's nameplate, with the exception of the Eastland Mall store in Evansville, Indiana. The Eastland Mall store closed and became Dillard's instead due to the existing Lazarus store which already became Macy's in 2005. The downtown St. Louis store and headquarters were first downsized and then closed in summer 2013; the remaining retail employees moved to other stores, while the headquarters staff moved to Earth City.

== See also ==
- Stix, Baer & Fuller, an earlier competing St. Louis department store
- List of department stores converted to Macy's
- List of defunct department stores of the United States
