= Lake Murray (California) =

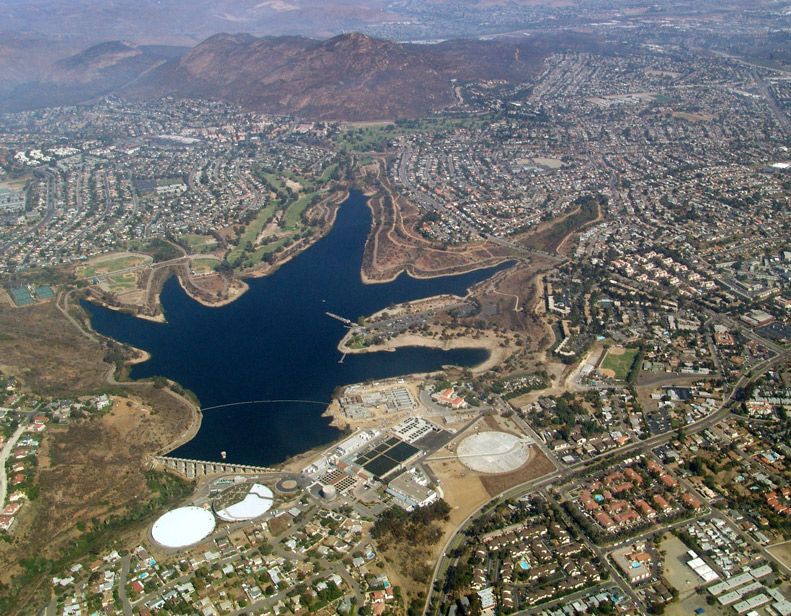
- Lake Murray viewed from the air

- Location within California Location within the United States
- Location: San Diego, California
- Coordinates: 32.7861°N 117.0442°W
- Type: Reservoir
- Basin countries: United States
- Managing agency: City of San Diego
- Surface area: 171.1 acres (69.2 ha)
- Max. depth: 95 ft (29 m)
- Website: www.sandiego.gov/reservoirs-lakes/murray-reservoir

Lake Murray is a reservoir in San Diego, California, operated by the City of San Diego's Public Utilities Department. When full, the reservoir covers 171.1 acres (69.2 ha), has a maximum water depth of 95 feet (29 m), and a shoreline of 3.2 miles (5.1 km). The asphalt-paved service road lining roughly two-thirds of the lake's perimeter is a popular recreation site for the Navajo community as well as residents of the northernmost neighborhoods in La Mesa. It lies south of Cowles Mountain and a small golf course. It also functions as an important aeronautical reporting point for aircraft inbound to land at Montgomery-Gibbs Executive Airport (identifier: KMYF).

== History ==
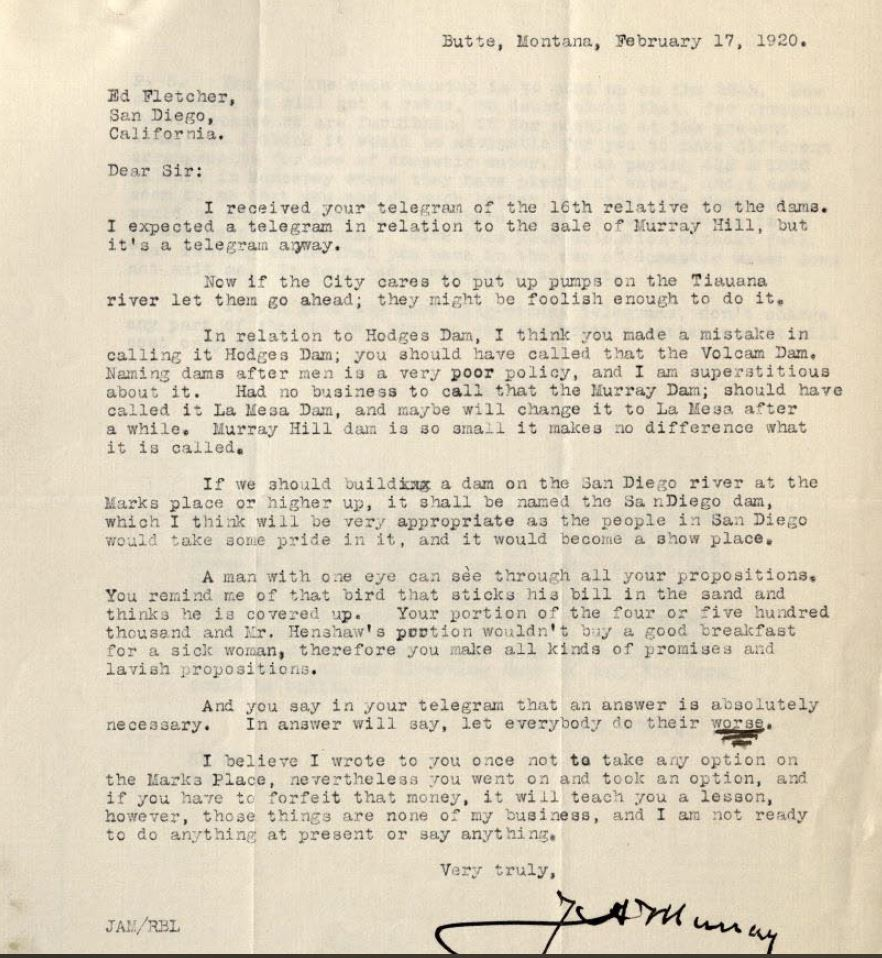
Murray chides his water company's operator for naming dams after men.

The reservoir was formed in 1894 with the construction of an earthen dam, and was known as La Mesa Reservoir. In 1910 the dam and reservoir were bought by James Andrew Murray and Ed Fletcher as part of the Cuyamaca Water Company. Following the great San Diego County flooding in 1916 (associated with the rainmaker Charles Hatfield), the reservoir was the principal source of water for the city of San Diego. In 1919, the dam was enlarged and the capacity of the reservoir greatly expanded. The dam and lake were renamed in 1920 after James Andrew Murray, the majority owner of the water company. Fletcher sold the Cuyamaca Water Company, including flooding rights to Lake Murray, to the La Mesa, Lemon Grove and Spring Valley Irrigation District in 1926. The city of San Diego took over operation of the reservoir in 1950, and purchased the reservoir and flooding rights from Helix Irrigation District in 1961.

== Ecology ==
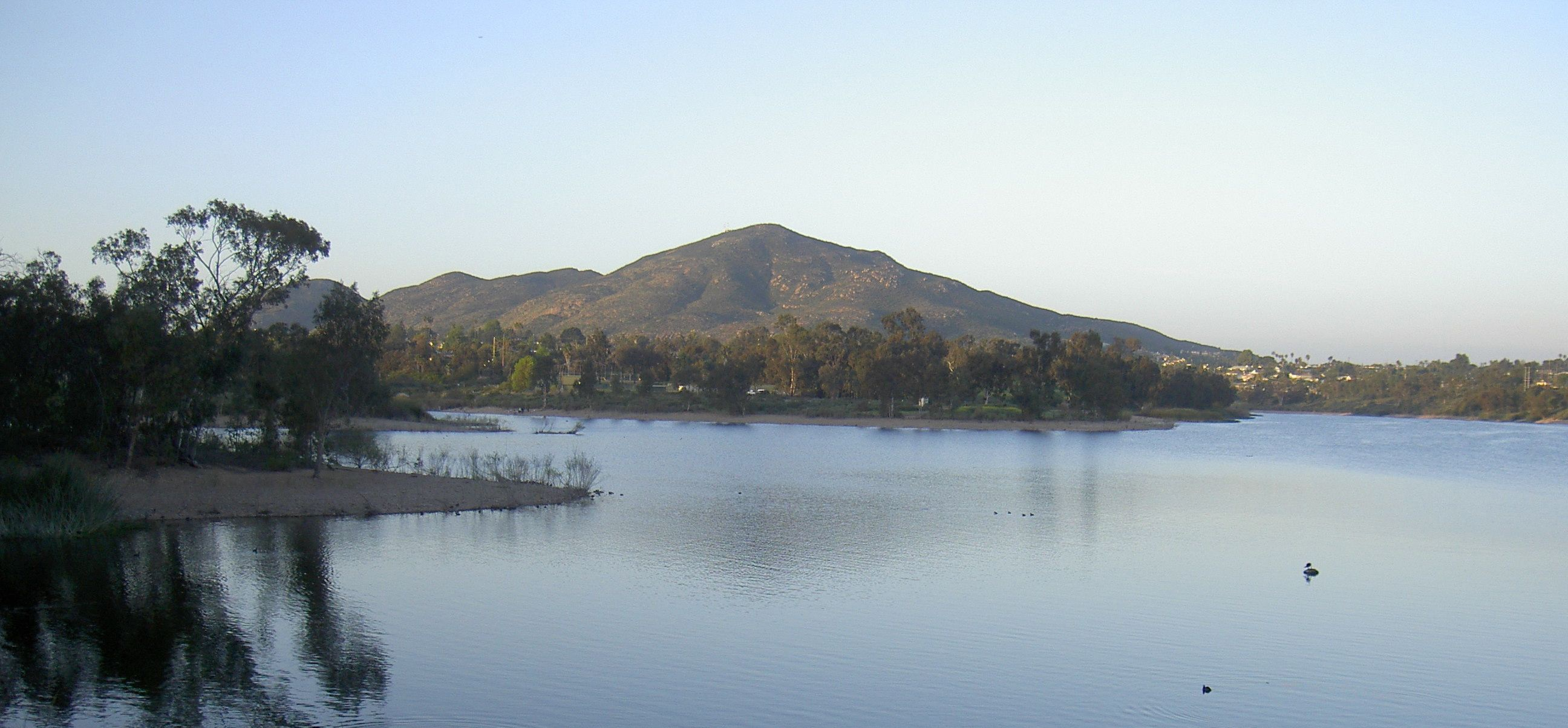
Cowles Mountain over Lake Murray, 2009

At least 149 species of birds have been observed and recorded at Lake Murray. Among other species, the lake supports flocks of the endangered tricolored blackbird. The reservoir also has Florida-strain largemouth bass, bluegill, channel catfish, black crappie, and trout (stocked November–May).

The area also contains many endemic or naturalized plant species which include: Baccharis sarothroides, encelia californica, eriogonum fasciculatum, agave attenuata (Foxtail agave), opuntia littoralis (Coastal prickly pear), ferocactus viridescens (San Diego barrel cactus), pseudognaphalium californicum, datura wrightii (Sacred datura), artemisia californica, malosma laurina, ambrosia deltoidea, corymbia citriodora, schinus molle (Peruvian peppertree), hesperoyucca whipplei, tamarix ramosissima, centaurea melitensis, calystegia macrostegia, adenostoma fasciculatum, euphorbia peplus, ricinus communis, hirschfeldia incana, crocanthemum scoparium, rumex crispus, carduus pycnocephalus, carpobrotus edulis, schoenoplectus californicus (California bulrush), myoporum laetum, salix nigra, foeniculum vulgare, callistemon citrinus and schinus terebinthifolia among others.

== Recreational usage ==
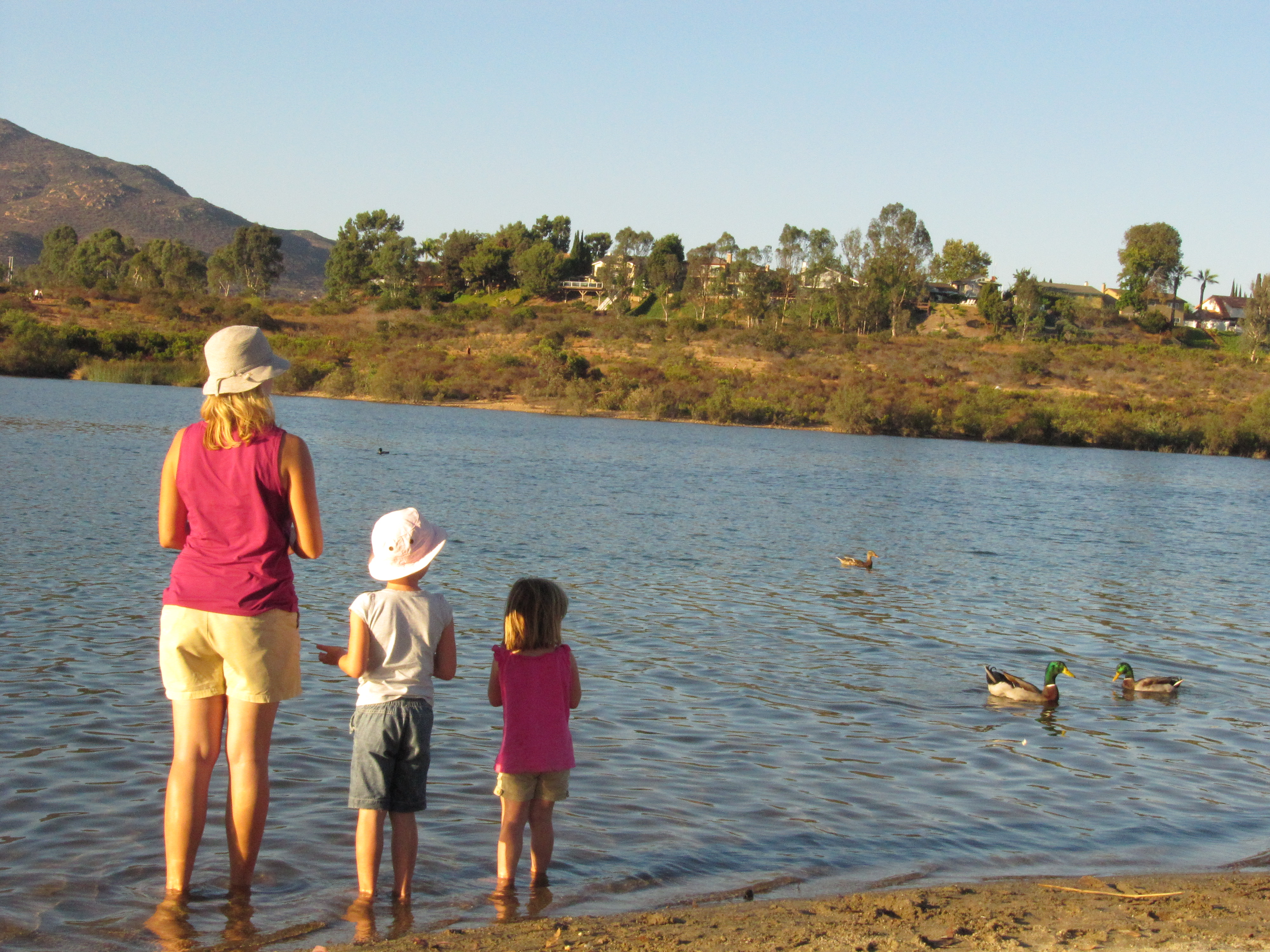
A family feeding the ducks at Lake Murray

Lake Murray is a popular site for hikers, cyclists, and runners who travel around the periphery of the lake. It is not possible to cross the dam and complete the loop like nearby Miramar Reservoir but there is 3.2 mi (5.1 km) of path with access at multiple points.

Kayaking and catch-and-release fishing are both allowed on the reservoir. Birdwatchers enjoy visiting Lake Murray where ducks, geese, and herons abound. At least 149 bird species have been observed and recorded here.

Lake Murray is open for shore fishing and private boats, kayaks, and float tubes seven days a week. The Department of Fish and Wildlife stock the reservoir with Florida-strain largemouth bass, bluegill, channel catfish, black crappie and trout.

== See also ==
- Mission Trails Regional Park
- List of lakes in California
