= Linda Vista, San Diego =

Linda Vista, San Diego The V
- Community of San Diego
- Linda Vista
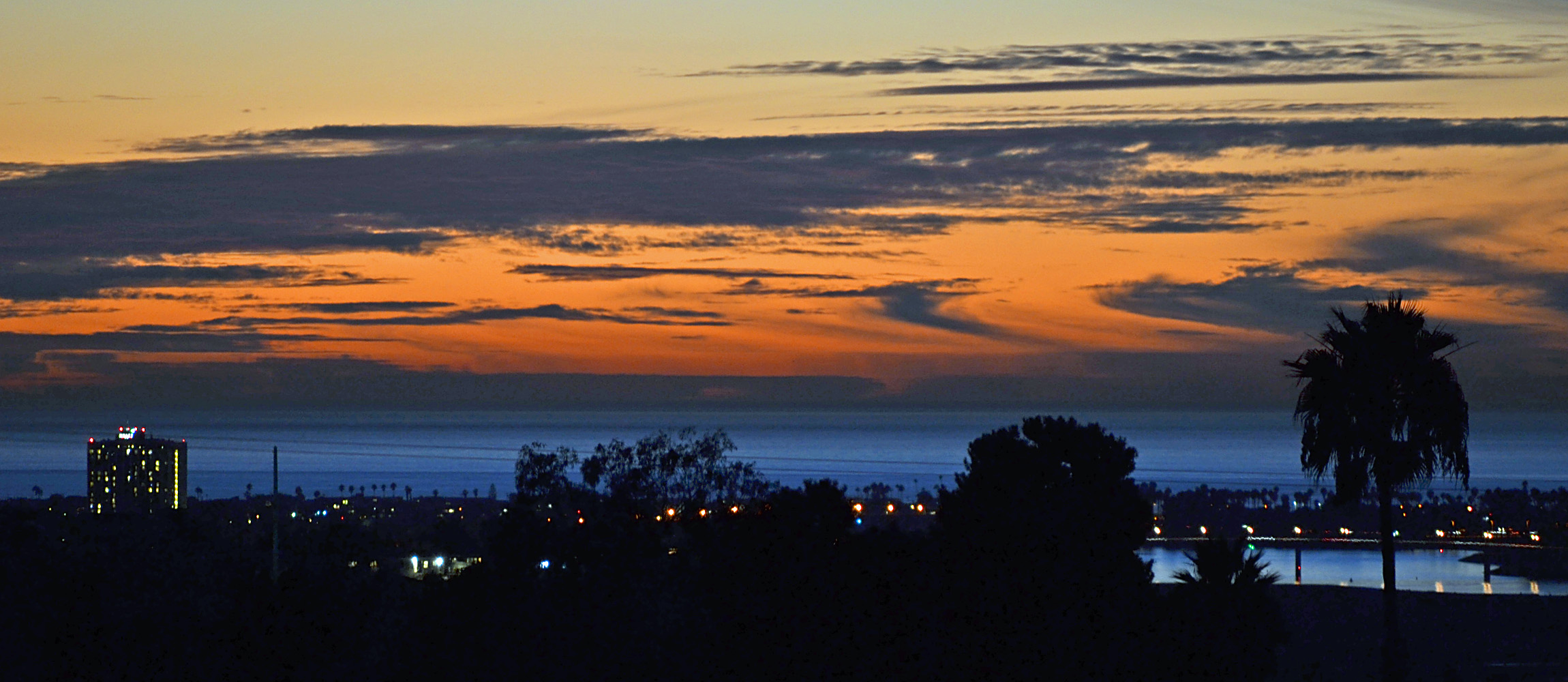
- Linda Vista, which means "Pretty View" in Latin American Spanish, overlooks Mission Bay and the Pacific Ocean to the west
- Nickname: The V
- Location within Central San Diego#California#USA
- Coordinates: 32°47′1″N 117°10′16″W
- Country: United States of America
- State: California
- County: San Diego
- City: San Diego
- Postal code: 92111
- Area codes: 619, 858
- Website: www.sandiego.gov/planning/community/profiles/lindavista/

Linda Vista (Spanish for "Pretty View") is a community in San Diego, California, United States. Located east of Mission Bay, north of Mission Valley, and south-east of Tecolote Canyon, it lies on a mesa overlooking Mission Valley to the south and Mission Bay and the Pacific Ocean to the west. It is home to the University of San Diego.

Linda Vista is divided between two City Council districts, with Councilmember Raul Campillo representing the majority of the neighborhood that lies in District 7 and Councilmember Jennifer Campbell representing the portion immediately surrounding the University of San Diego that lies in District 2.

== History ==
There was an old Linda Vista established in 1886, which was likely centered on San Clemente Canyon. However, it ceased to exist after it was heavily damaged by the 1916 flood.

Many of the homes in Linda Vista were built in 1940-41 as part of a government project to house aircraft workers for the war effort. A construction project that was assisted by Reuben H. Fleet beginning in October 1941 resulted in 3,001 houses built within 200 days.

The Linda Vista Shopping Center, built in 1943, demolished in 1972, was the first mall in San Diego and one of the first in the country. It won awards for its garden city-inspired design. A Walker Scott department store branch anchored the center.

Starting in the late 1970s, Vietnamese immigrants and refugees began resettling into Linda Vista after the Vietnam War and subsequently the Fall of Saigon. This would leave a huge impact into the community as many Vietnamese families still reside in Linda Vista.

=== 1995 San Diego tank rampage ===
On May 17, 1995, Shawn Nelson stole an M60A3 Patton tank out of the California Army National Guard Armory on Mesa College Drive and went on a tank rampage through Linda Vista, and then north to Kearny Mesa along Convoy Street. The 57-ton tank easily plowed through road signs, traffic lights, utility poles, and fire hydrants, and crushed approximately forty parked vehicles, including an RV. The damage to utility poles knocked out power to at least 5,100 San Diego Gas & Electric customers in the Linda Vista neighborhood.

== Schools and Universities ==
- University of San Diego (University)
- Kearny High School (Grades 9–12)
- Mark Twain Sr. High (Grades 7–12)
- Francis W. Parker School (Grades K–12)
- Linda Vista Elementary School (Grades K–5)
- Carson Elementary School (Pre-School–Grade 5)
- Holy Family Catholic School (Pre-School–Grade 8)
- Montgomery Middle School (Grades 6–8)
- Chesterton Elementary School (Linda Vista, California) (Grades Pre-K through Fifth grade)
- Empower Charter (Linda Vista, California) (Grades Kindergarten through Sixth grade)
