= Colonel Fletcher Building =

Building in Downtown San Diego

Coordinates: 32°42′57″N 117°9′32″W

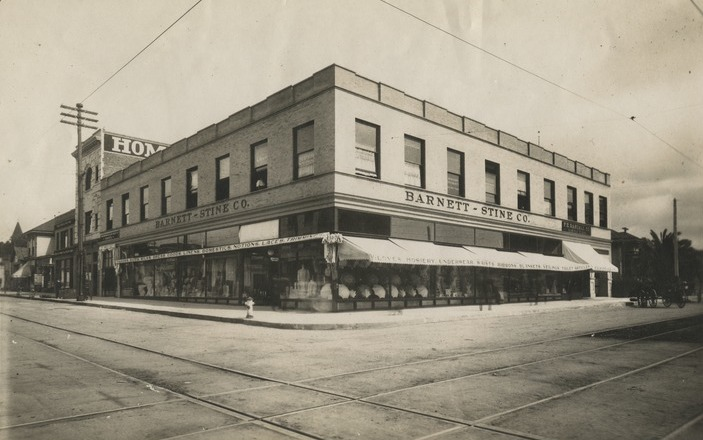
Barnett-Stine Co. 6th and D (Broadway) San Diego est. 1910

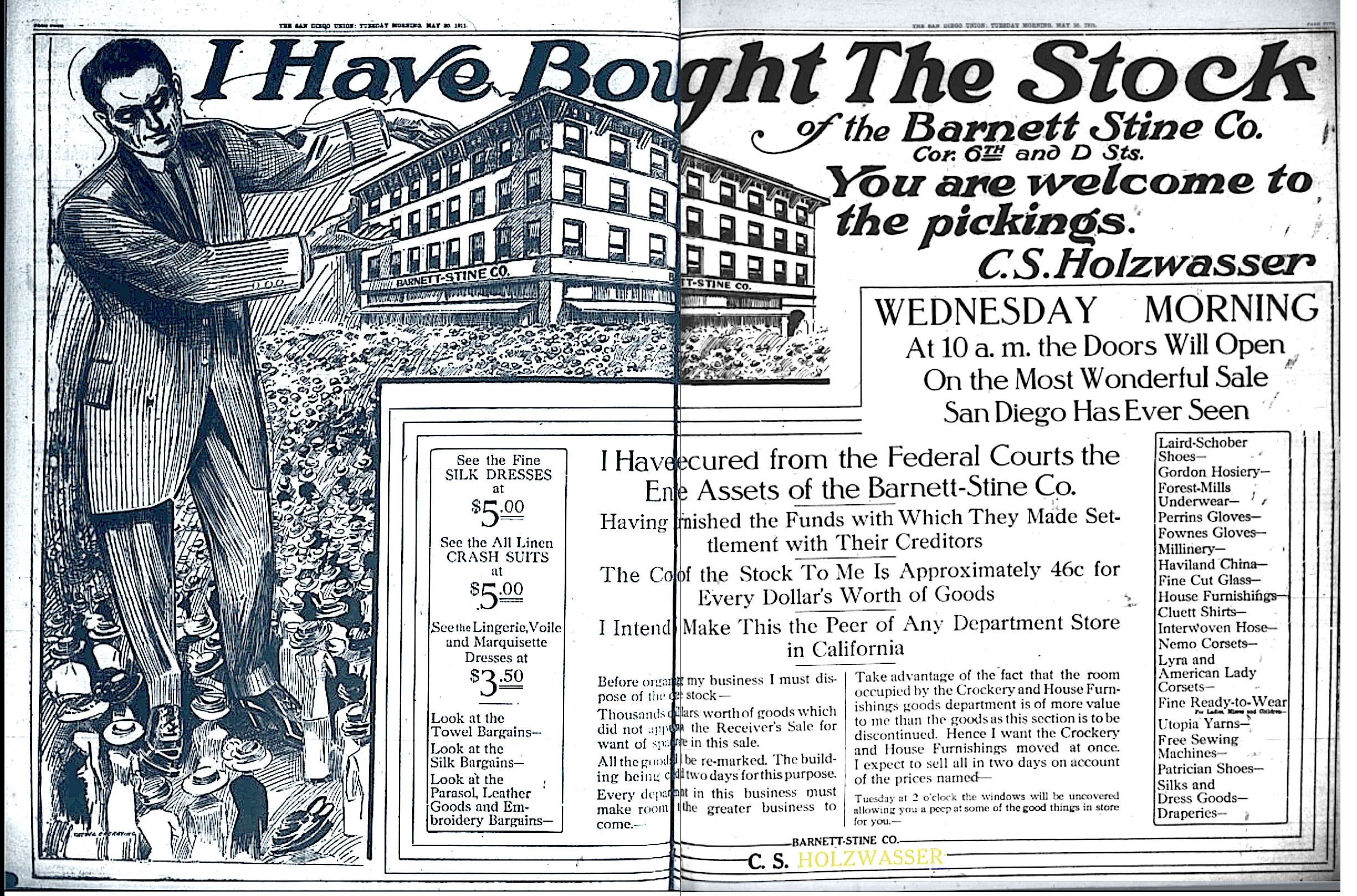
The building shown in an ad by the new department store Holzwasser's, which acquired the assets of Barnett-Stine. May 30, 1911

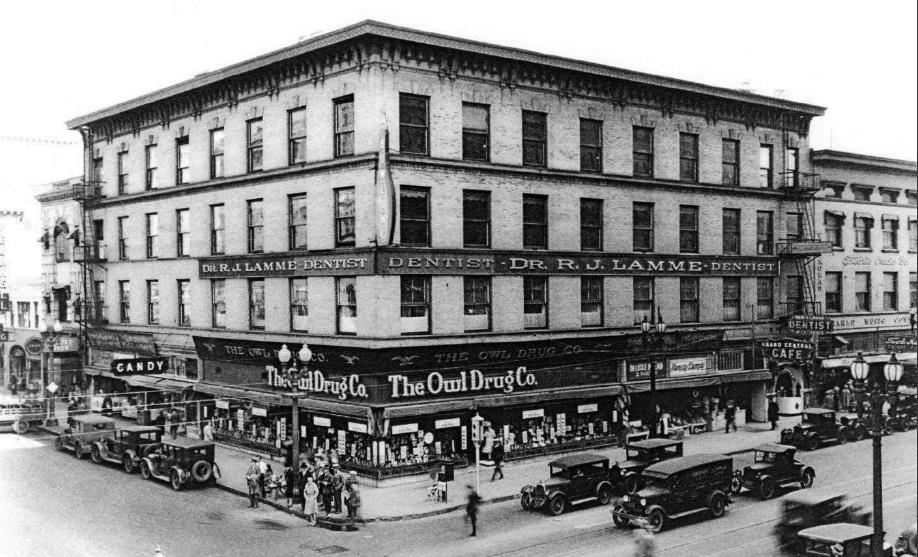
Colonel Fletcher Building around 1920, housing a store of the Owl Drug Company

The Colonel Fletcher Building at 602–632 Broadway, in Core, San Diego, was the site of some of the retail history of San Diego. The building is at the northeast corner of 6th and Broadway; Broadway was originally named D Street.

It was built by "Colonel" Ed Fletcher around 1906–1908 along with Frank Salmans, and designed by architect Edward Quayle of the Quayle Brothers (who would later do the 1935 renovation of the Walker Scott Building). It was remodeled around 2005 by Champion Development Group.

Originally it was a two-story building housing the Barnett-Stine Co. department store. Two more stories were added.

Barnett-Stine went out of business in 1911 and Holzwasser's department store, opened in the building. In 1919, Holzwasser's moved to a new, larger building, now known as the Walker Scott Building. (Holzwasser's would go out of business in 1933 and the first Walker Scott store would open there.)

The Owl Drug Company was then located in the building.

The building was renovated in 2008.
