= James Andrew Murray =

Irish entrepreneur (1840–1921)

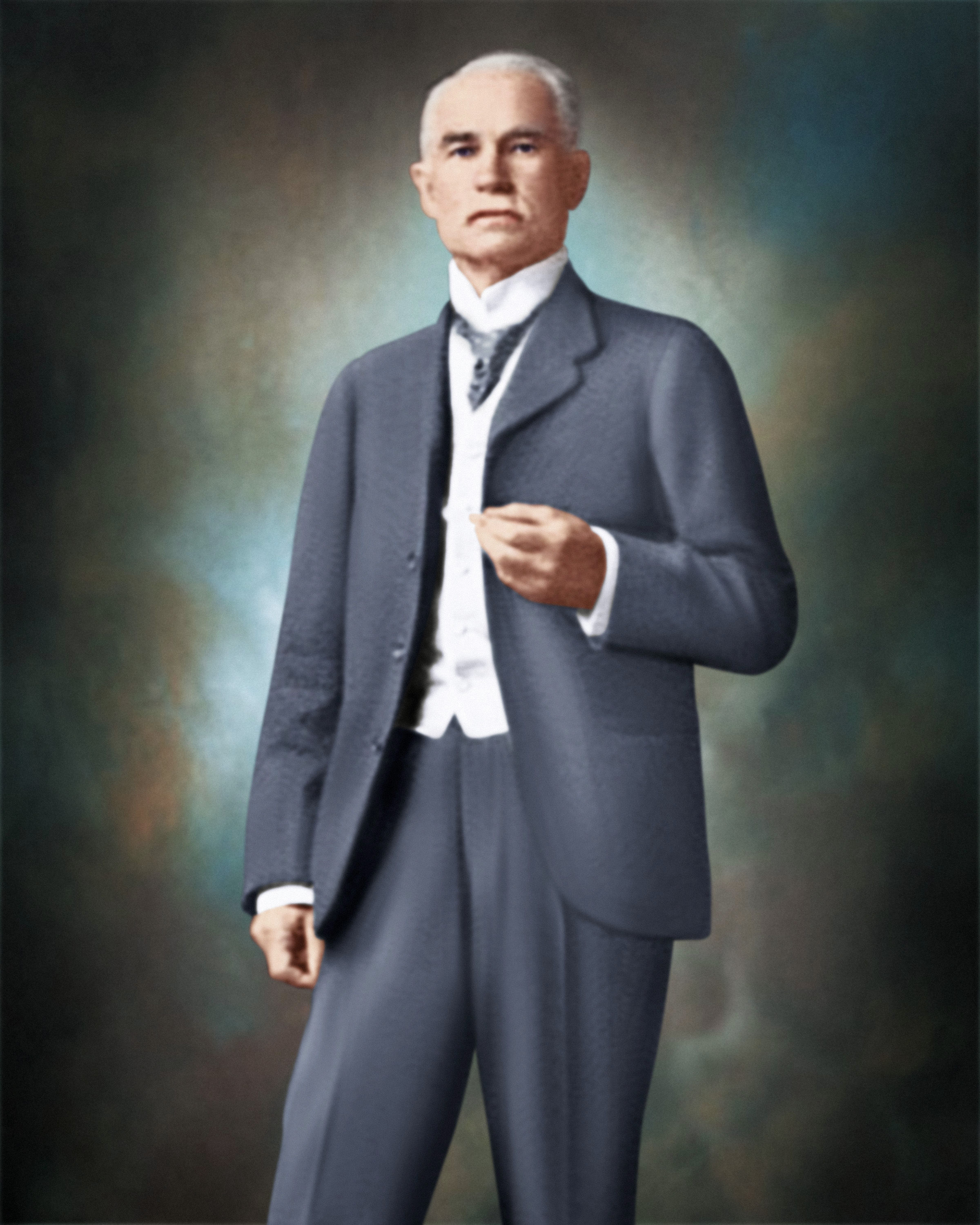
- Born: September 10, 1840; County Clare, Munster, Ireland
- Died: May 11, 1921 (aged 80); Monterey, California, U.S.
- Spouse(s): Ann MacNamara; Mary Coulture

James Andrew Murray (September 10, 1840 – May 11, 1921) was an Irish-born entrepreneur from County Clare, Ireland. He moved to Ontario, Canada with his family as young boy. As a young adult he travelled west to California during the Gold Rush days and then moved north to the Montana Territory. It was in the Montana Territories where he found success mining the streams near Pioneer, a small camp between Missoula and Helena. He parlayed his success in mining to build a business empire that stretched throughout the Western United States, He owned mines, banks, resorts, office buildings and water companies in Idaho, Washington State, Nevada, Arizona and California. The largest of the water companies was the Cuyamaca Water Company located in San Diego, California. Murray's operator, Ed Fletcher, named one of the man-made lakes in the system Lake Murray. Fletcher was rebuked for this decision as Murray was superstitious about naming dams after men.

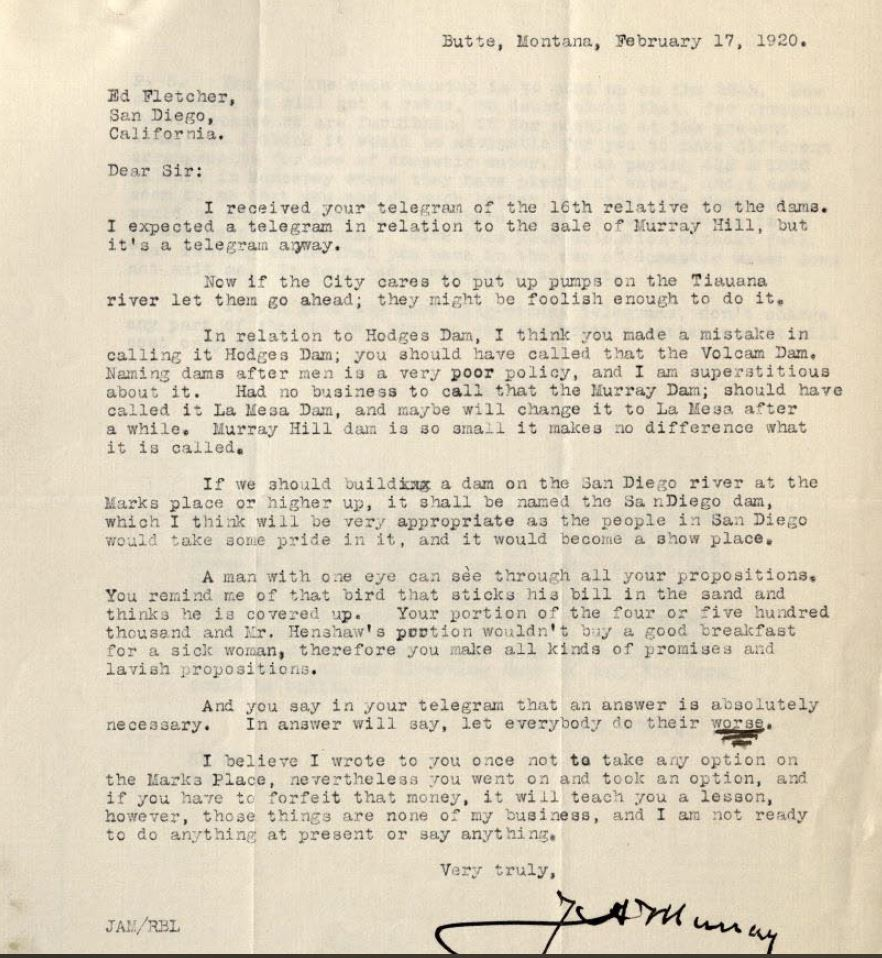
Murray chides the operator of his water company about naming dams after men,

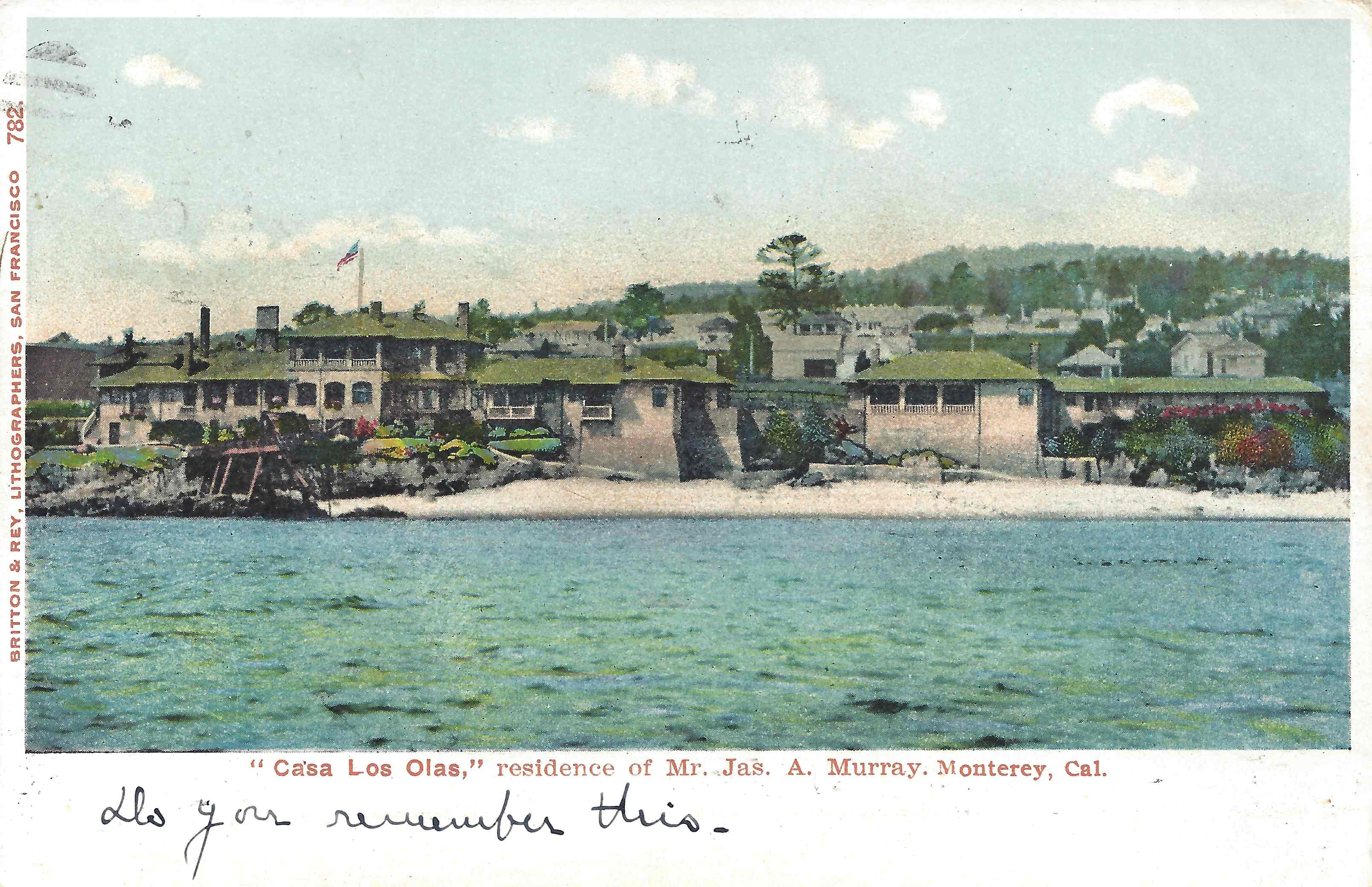
Mansion built by Hugh Tevis and purchased by James A. Murray.

Murray operated his businesses from Butte, Montana for many years, until he purchased the Tevis mansion adjacent to Cannery Row in Monterey California in 1900. His business partners included W.A. Clark, Marcus Daly, and Augustus Heinze. Murray was active in the Irish Nationalist movement in the United States. He employed his nephew, future U.S. Senator James E. Murray to assist with his business and advocate for an Independent Ireland. Murray's philanthropy included supporting the performing arts in the Montana Territory though a long-term partnership with John Maguire.
