= Holzwasser's =

Department store in San Diego, California

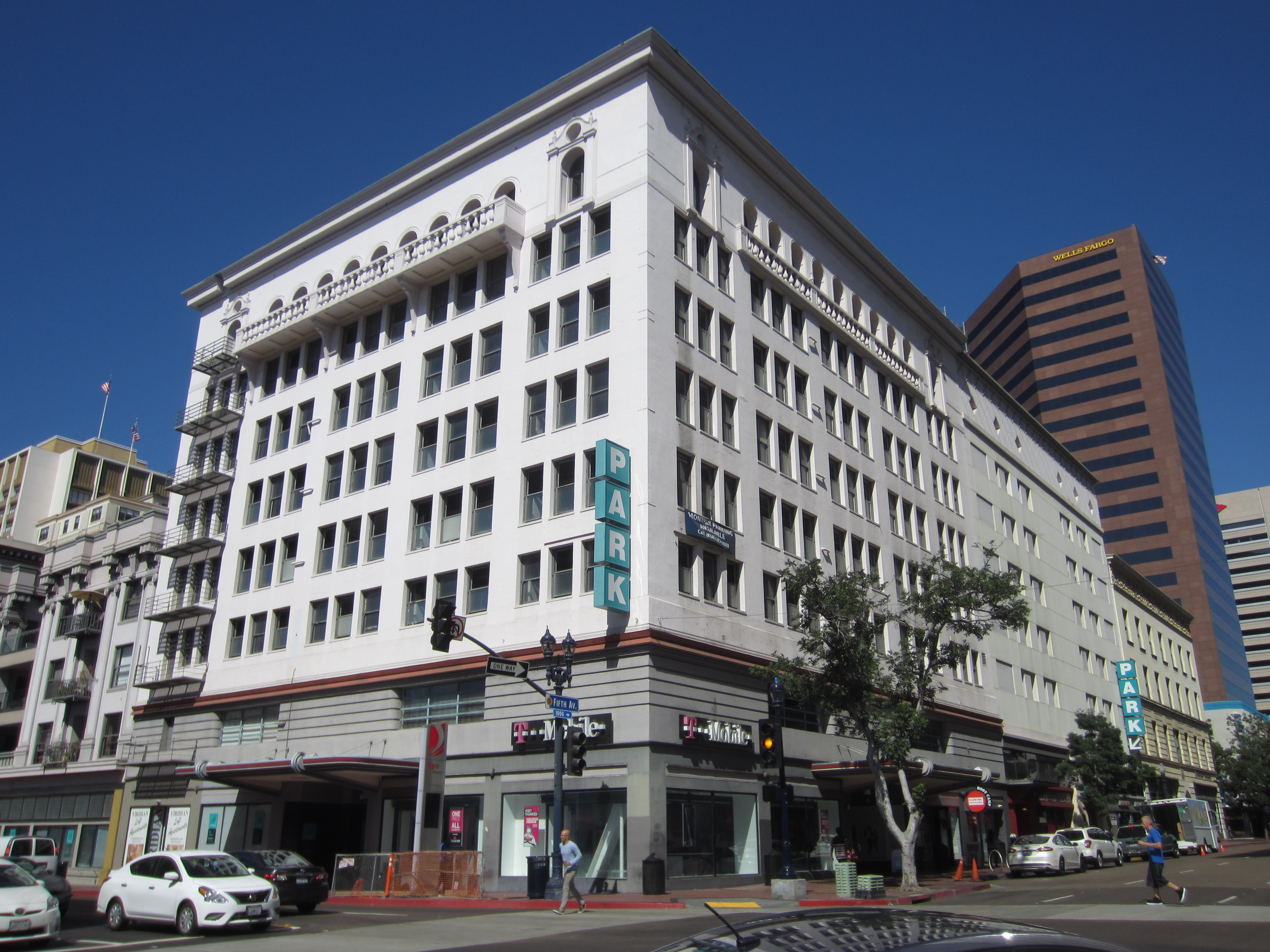
Holzwasser's second location at the NW corner of 5th & Broadway built in 1919 specifically to house the department store. It operated here till 1933. In 1935 it became the first store of the new store Walker Scott, which would grow into a chain.

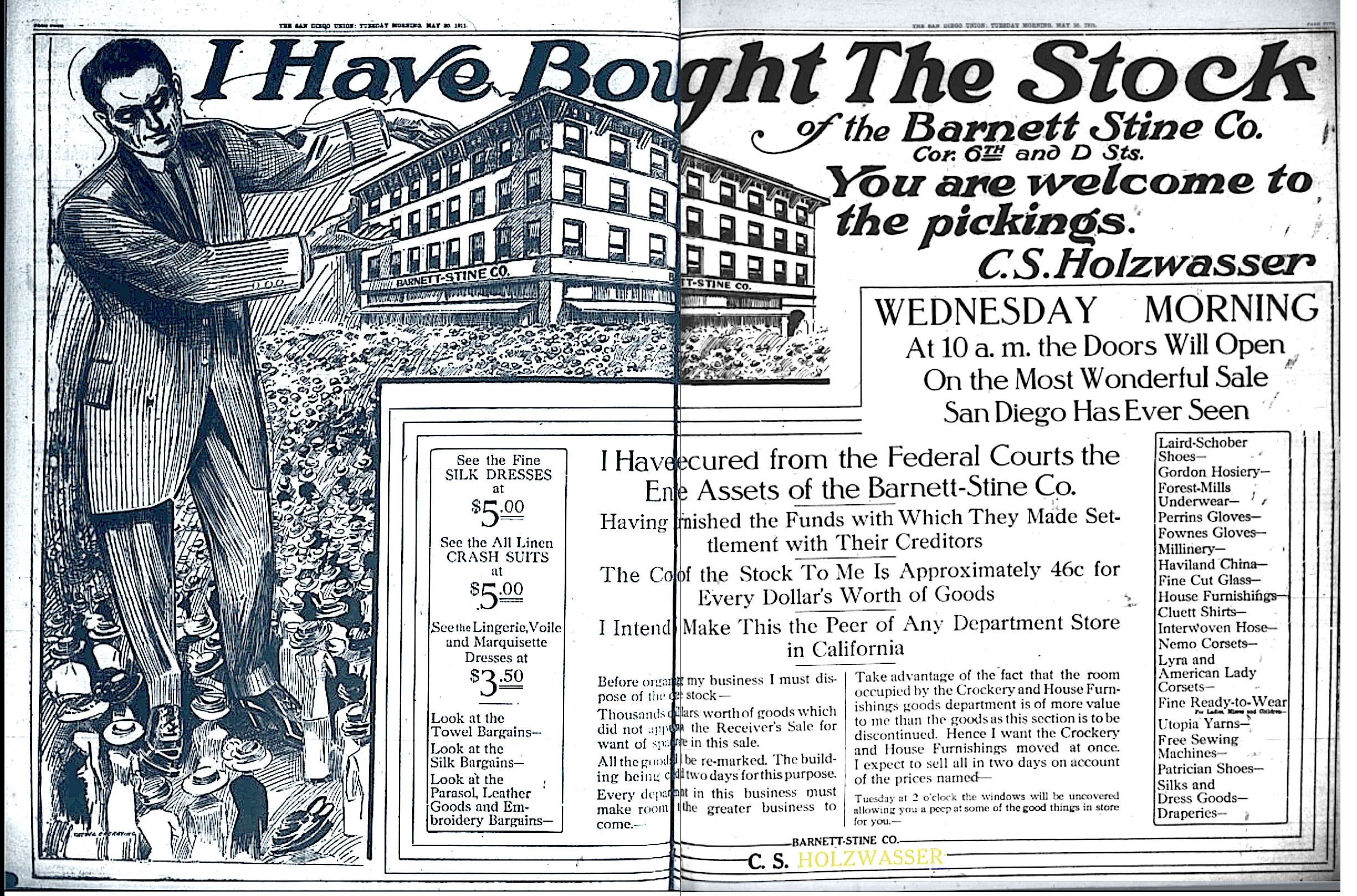
Holzwasser's original location at the NE corner of 6th & Broadway, shown in an ad when it first launched as a business in May 1911, having acquired the assets of Barnett-Stine.

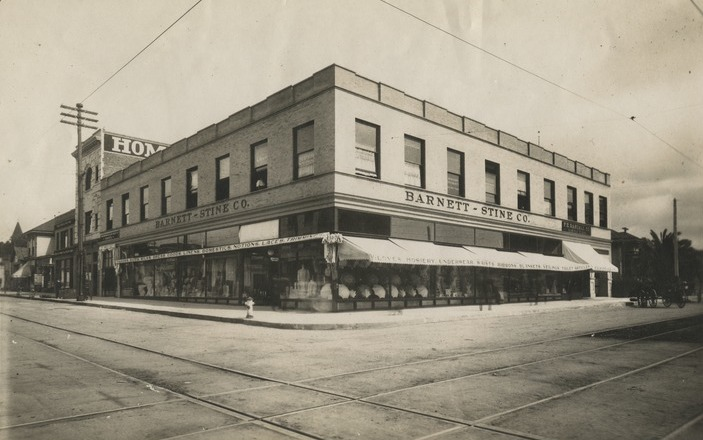
Holzwasser's first location before it opened; while it was still the Barnett-Stine Co. and only two stories. An additional two stories would be added. Around 1910

Holzwasser's was a large department store that operated from 1911 to 1933 in the downtown San Diego shopping district along Broadway and Fifth and Sixth avenues.

== First location ==
The first Holzwasser location, now known as the Colonel Fletcher Building, was built at the northeast corner of 6th and Broadway by "Colonel" Ed Fletcher around 1906–1908 along with Frank Salmans, and designed by architect Edward Quayle of the Quayle Brothers (who would later do the 1935 renovation of the Walker Scott Building). It was remodeled around 2005 by Champion Development Group. Originally it was a two-story building housing the Barnett-Stine Co. department store. Two more stories were added. Barnett-Stine went out of business in 1911 and Holzwasser's opened in the building.

== Second location and epilogue ==
In 1919, Holzwasser's built a new building to house its store in Spanish Colonial Revival style; John Terrel Vawter, architect. It opened in 1920.

Holzwasser's went out of business in 1933.

In 1935 Walker Scott, a venture of Messrs. Walker and Scott of the Fifth Street Store in Los Angeles and Walker's Long Beach, opened in the building, which would become the flagship of a chain of department stores across San Diego County and beyond.
