= Escondido Village =

Escondido Village may refer to:

- a complex of Stanford University student housing
- Escondido Village Mall, California's first enclosed mall
