= Linda Vista Shopping Center =

Mall in San Diego, California, US

The Linda Vista Shopping Center is a neighborhood shopping center in San Diego and one of the first in the United States, built in 1943. It was predated in California only by the Broadway & 87th Street shopping center in South Los Angeles, which opened seven years earlier in 1936.

Linda Vista was dedicated by Eleanor Roosevelt. Pasadena architects Karl F. Giberson and Whitney P. Smith designed the center. It is located in the neighborhood of Linda Vista, an area that saw population soar in 1941, when 3000 homes were constructed in less than a year to house aircraft workers and their families. Linda Vista was the largest U.S. defense housing project during World War II, and the world's largest low-cost modern housing development, according to the San Diego Historical Society.

The design was innovative for the time and place, with Pasadena architect Whitney Smith following garden city principles, with parking around the edges and a landscaped "main street" or "town green" interior with a lawn, trees, and an arc-shaped, bench-lined covered promenade. Uniform paint color, shopfronts, and signage were also relatively new concepts. The center measured 82,000 square feet (7,600 m^{2}) of leasable space, consisting of 10 specialty stores, a dime store, supermarket and small branch of the San Diego–based Walker Scott department store (originally the independent "Linda Vista department store"). There was parking for 261 cars around the entire perimeter, also an innovative feature.

The center won a Creditable Mention Award from the Southern California Chapter of the American Institute of Architects in January 1947.

Much (but not all) of the complex was demolished and replaced in 1972. It still hosts many shops, now having an Asian-centric offering, reflecting the evolving population in the area.
