= Pine Hills, San Diego County, California =

Unincorporated community in California, United States

Coordinates: 33°02′54″N 116°37′51″W

Pine Hills is an unincorporated community in San Diego County, California, about a mile south and slightly west of Julian. It is located along and at the southern end of Pine Hills Road, about two miles south of state Highway 78. The residents of Pine Hills have an address in Julian in the 92036 zip code.

Pine Hills is located largely within the Cleveland National Forest on a knoll that extends from about 3,900 feet (1,200 m) asl to about 4,300 feet (1,300 m) asl. The community includes the Pine Hills Lodge and the YMCA's Camp Marston and Raintree Ranch. It is near William Heise County Park, Pine Hills Fire Station and Robotic Weather Station. The Pine Hills Mutual Water Company is based in the community. Many homes in Pine Hills burnt in the 2003 Cedar Fire.

== History ==
Ed Fletcher acquired land adjacent to his existing property in 1910 to prevent logging. In 1912, Fletcher, George Marston, and banker Myron Gilmore developed part of the land into the Pine Hills development. Fletcher founded the Pine Hills Community Association in 1922. The neighboring Frisius Park subdivision was developed in the 1960s. Deer Lake Park is another subdivision of Pine Hills.

Pine Hills had its own post office from September 11, 1913, to June 30, 1931, when it was closed and moved to Julian.
