= Palm Springs Mall =

- Location: Palm Springs, California
- Address: 2365 E Tahquitz Canyon Way, Palm Springs, CA 92262
- Opened: 1959
- Closed: By 2015
- Owner: College of the Desert
- Architect: Mayer and Kanner; Leitch and Cleveland
- Num. of stores: 0 (space for 31)
- Num. of anchor tenants: 0 (space for 1)
- Floor area: 315,119 square feet (29275.51m²)
- Floors: 1 (2 in former Gottschalks)
- Parking: 1,200

Palm Springs Mall, formerly known as Palm Springs Shopping Center and Palm Springs Shopping Center Mall, was an enclosed shopping mall in Palm Springs, California. Originally constructed as an open air shopping center, the center would expand and be fully enclosed in 1965, which included the addition of a J.C. Penney. In 1970, Walker Scott would open up their own location at the mall, serving as its second anchor. In 1986, the mall went through a major renovation that added a food court, retail space, and a new exterior and interior design. By the 2000s, the mall saw a decrease in foot traffic, which caused tenants to move out of the mall. In 2014, College of the Desert offered the property owner to purchase the mall in order to turn it into a satellite campus. The owner refused to sell the property to the college, which resulted in both parties going to court. Subsequently, College of the Desert acquired the mall for $22 million. Demolition of the mall commenced in May 2019.

== History ==
In early 1959, oilman-turned-land developer Ray Ryan, along with the president of Seeterrra, Inc., A.R. Simon, collaborated on the concept of building a shopping center in Palm Springs, California. Two Los Angeles–based architectural firm, Meyer and Kanner and Leitch and Cleveland, were commissioned to design and plan out the buildings, while Ernest W. Hahn and Leonard Wolf were co-contracted for the construction of the project. In July, Ryan and Simon announced that the vice president of Market Basket, Duncan Shaw, had signed a lease to open the supermarket at the Palm Springs Shopping Center. A month later, a leasing agreement was arranged between Sid Rice of Los Angeles’ Phillips Lyon Company (the exclusive agent for the center), and a Southern California bowling operator. Some of the nation’s professional bowlers would gather in late October at the newly built 24-lane bowling with ceremonial dedication. Construction of the bowling center cost $1 million ($8 million in 2019), with a floor space of 25,000 square feet (2,300 m^{2}) and a proposed expansion of 32 lanes.

=== Second phase (1965) ===
In 1965, construction on the second phase of the project began on the center. Construction commenced on a 289,000 square feet (26,800 m^{2}) enclosed, air conditioned addition to the existing shopping center. The center would also be renamed to Palm Springs Shopping Center Mall. In addition, the new center would include a J.C. Penney department store in one of the retail space. Robert C. Moore, divisional and merchandising manager of fashion designs for J.C. Penney, left Tucson to become sales and merchandising manager at the Palm Springs location. Other tenants and activities include a Bank of America, Thrifty Drugstore, Winchell’s Donut House, a restaurant and coffee shop, cocktail lounge, an ice skating rink, and an indoor-outdoor children’s play area.

In April 1969, Palm Springs Shopping Center Mall was renamed simply to Palm Springs Mall. At the same time, the September 1969 issue of Palm Springs Life widely proclaimed the Palm Springs Mall as “the retail hub of the Coachella Valley”, largely due to the fact that shoppers came from low and high desert communities to shop at the mall.

=== Walker Scott ===
In 1970, San Diego–based Walker Scott opened up their location at the mall.

=== 1980s ===
In 1983, J.C. Penney left in favor of the newly constructed Palm Desert Town Center in Palm Desert.

==== 1986 Renovation ====
By 1986, the mall underwent a multi-million dollar renovation, which included the addition of a food court, multiple retail space, a Kmart, and local retailer The Alley. Kmart officials signed a lease with property owners Benequity Properties of Los Angeles, which would occupy the former J.C. Penney space. Furthermore, the mall also included a new facade, a revamped parking lot, and new landscaping and lighting fixtures. The renovation was designed by architectural firm David L. Christian Associates of Palm Springs. Walker Scott closed shortly after the renovation.

==== Buffums and Harris-Gottschalks ====
On October 18, 1989, Long Beach–based department store Buffums opened its doors in the former Walker Scott space. The grand opening of the new store was met with a ribbon-cutting ceremony by Sonny Bono, then-mayor of Palm Springs. The store was short-lived and was eventually replaced by a Harris-Gottschalks.

== Decline and redevelopment ==
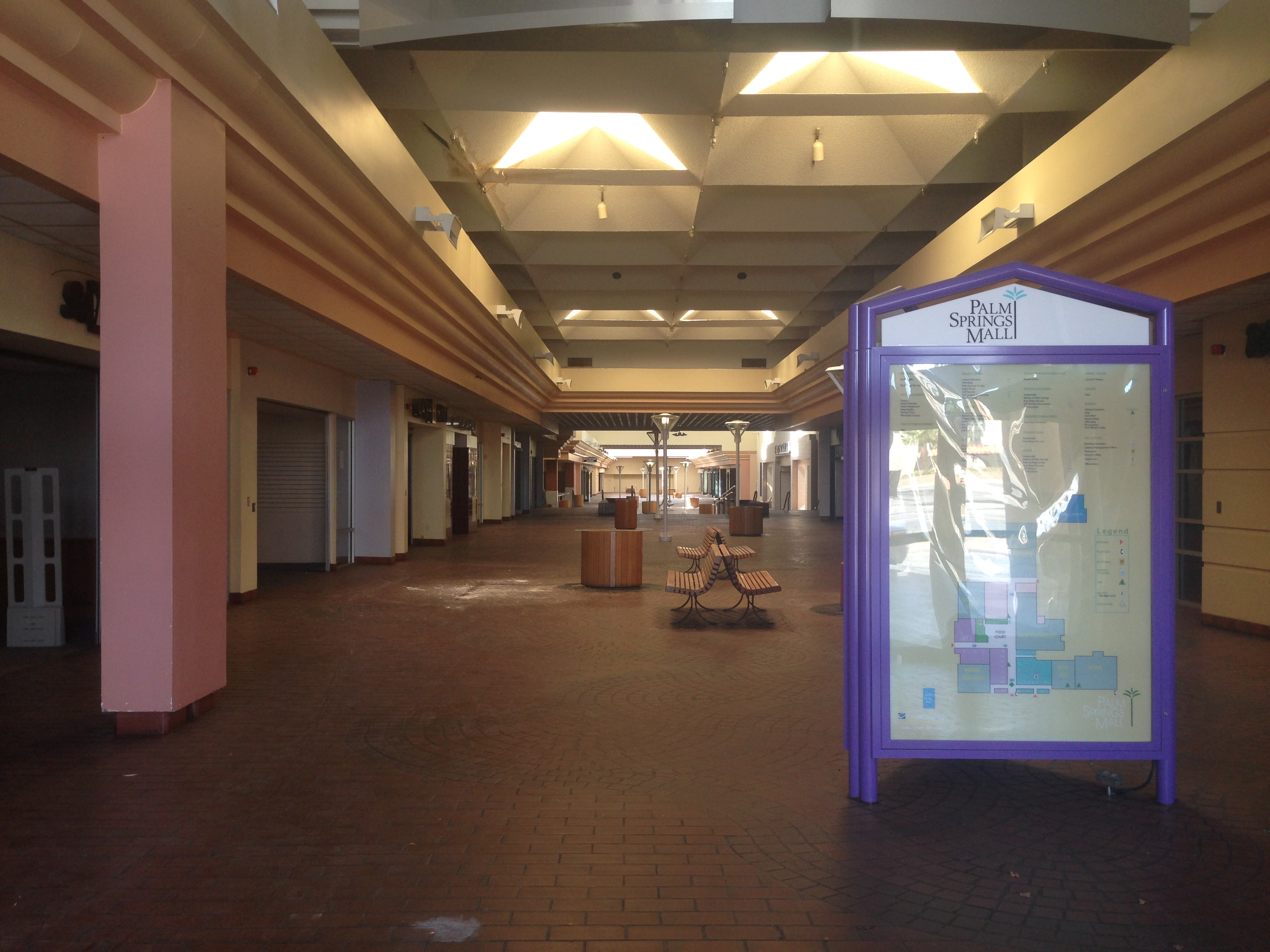
Empty storefronts inside the Palm Springs Mall.

By the 2000s, the mall saw a decrease in foot traffic that resulted in shuttered retail space. Gottschalks, the only anchor in the mall, closed its doors in 2009 after the company filed Chapter 11 bankruptcy. Other major tenants such as Vons, True Value, Ross Dress for Less, and OfficeMax closed and had relocated to other sites. In 2012, Chinese businessman, Haiming Tan, purchased the property for $9.2 million.

In 2014, College of the Desert considered redeveloping the property and proposed the location be turned into a satellite campus. College of the Desert officials made an offer to the owner in hopes of negotiating a purchase; however, the owner refused to sell the property to the college. This prompted the community college to take the owner to court, invoking eminent domain, and exercising their right to acquire the property. Attorneys for the owner claimed in court papers that the college did not notify Tan or his company, YTC Investments, and expressed concerns over the city’s involvement in the property. In 2017, Michael Leife, a representative speaking on behalf of the mall owner, stated the owner did not want to sell the mall and had plans to develop the property for both residential and commercial use.

After a four-year battle between the two parties, College of the Desert finally acquired the former Palm Springs Mall for $22 million. Demolition of the mall began in May 2019 with construction to begin in 2023 for the first phase of the new campus.
