= College Grove Shopping Center =

Shopping mall in San Diego, California

- Location: San Diego, CA 92115
- Coordinates: 32.7407°N 117.056°W
- Opened: July 28, 1960
- Developer: Michael Birkant, Phillip Lyons, George A. Scott
- Architect: John Graham & Company
- Floor area: 650,000 sq ft (60,000 m^{2}) (at opening)
- Public transit: MTS: 856 (weekends), 916, 917

College Grove Shopping Center, also Marketplace at the Grove, at SR-94 at College Avenue in Oak Park, San Diego, on the border of Lemon Grove, is an open-air shopping center, but was originally a regional shopping mall, only the second to be built in San Diego County, and the 37th in the country. It opened July 28, 1960 with an official grand opening ceremony on August 25, 1960. The site had 650,000 sq ft (60,000 m^{2}) of gross leasable space on its 70-acre (28 ha) site. The $28-million center had 60 stores (of which 20 were open at launch) and parking for 6,000 cars on two levels. There was a three-story branch of Walker Scott, the San Diego–based department store. The building contained the first escalator in Southern California and the first fire escape in San Diego. More than 250,000 people attended the first day the center was open on July 28.1960. There was a heliport with helicopter service to Lindbergh Field. A new amenity offered was "park-a-tot" child care. The architect was John Graham & Company of Seattle.

There was also a two-level (36,900 square foot) J.C. Penney, and J.J. Newberry and F.W. Woolworth variety stores. A one-level Mervyn's was added in the 1970s. In the mid-1980s the City of San Diego wished to have the center become a four-anchor enclosed mall, but anchor tenants could not be secured. Instead the center relaunched as Marketplace at the Grove in November 1988. By the late 1990s, the mall was half-vacant and in 1999 what remained of the original center was demolished, leaving Mervyn's and the mall's Longs Drugs store; the site was turned into a strip style power center, with the Mervyn's and a new HomeBase, Staples, Pic 'N' Save, Sam's Club and Walmart. HomeBase opened for business in December 1999, followed by Sam's Club, which made its debut in February 2000. Walmart welcomed its first shoppers on March 15 of the same year. Since 2002, Pic 'N' Save became Big Lots. Since 2003 the HomeBase site has been a Target. Since 2009 the Mervyn's site has been a Kohl's. In 2010 the Longs Drugs site became a Ross Dress For Less. In 2014, Staples closed, replacing it with a Sam Ash Music store two years later.

The Walker Scott building was demolished in 1987 to make way for a Mann 9-cinema multiplex. An iconic neon baton-majorette wearing an Indian headdress stood over the Mann 9 Theatres (now Sam's Club), from 1988 to 1999, before being moved to the front of the shopping center where artwork currently stands. Prior to display at the shopping center, the artwork was at the back of the College Drive-in's screen and shone onto El Cajon Boulevard for 36 years.

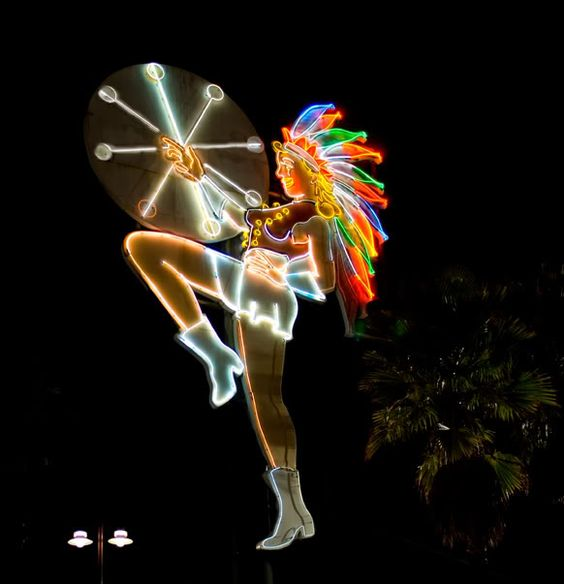

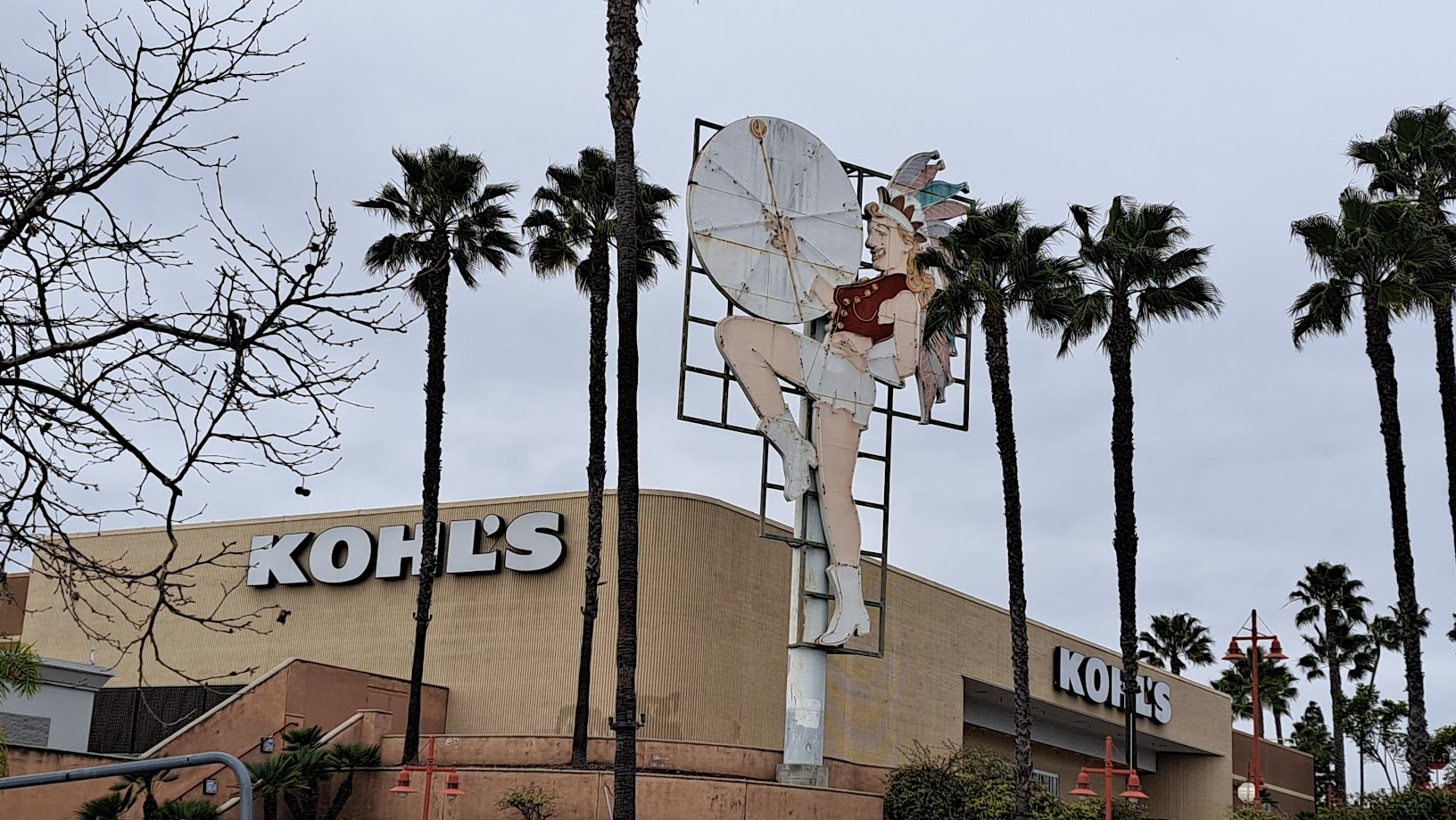
