= Cuyamaca Water Company =

Former water company in California, United States

The Cuyamaca Water Company (CWC) was a water company which operated in San Diego County, California, from 1910 to 1926. The origins of the Cuyamaca Water Company can be found in the San Diego Flume Company. The San Diego Flume Company was purchased on June 1, 1910, for $125,000 by the prominent San Diego politician and developer Ed Fletcher and a businessman from Montana, James Andrew Murray. The initial purchase transferred all water rights and properties owned by the San Diego Flume Company to the newly created Cuyamaca Water Company. CWC was principally financed by Murray, and managed by Fletcher.

== Early years ==
The CWC provided water to farming land stretching from the San Diego City Limits to the El Cajon valley. Fletcher realised the importance of water to farming, and used his real estate business to increase the profits of both companies by raising the cost of water in areas that he owned.

The CWC and the California Railway Commission had many disputes over the prices that the CWC wanted to charge their customers. When the company was bought all outstanding contracts went to the CWC, and the CWC had undertaken to uphold the prices that were in place. However, by the time that sales were finalized the prices had dropped. An appeal was made to the Railway Commission to raise prices, but it was denied because the CWC was declared a public utility by the Railway Commission.

== Expansion ==
The Railway Commission then wanted the San Diego Flume redone in concrete. Fletcher proposed that the flume be redone in a roofing material. The roofing material was approved and it cost $45,000. The material kept the flume running for another 20 years and the efficiency of the flume, helping to greatly increase profits from 1915 to 1923.

After the relining of the flume the CWC built two reservoirs near the downstream terminus of the flume. One was the Grossmont Reservoir which was built in 1913 with a capacity of 30 million gallons, and the other was the Murray Dam which replaced the La Mesa Dam.

In 1914, the CWC began to sell water to the city of San Diego. This led to the irrigators filing a complaint that they were getting poor water supply because the CWC was diverting water to the city. The CWC had a dual structure rate which determined how much the customers would pay by their land size. In 1917 the Railway Commission made the CWC disband the dual rate structure because of complaints by the customers and irrigators.

In 1920, in a case that was upheld by both the Railway Commission and the US Supreme Court prices were raised. Increased sales to the city interested the CWC because they purchased by the amount of water used and not by the land size.

Eventually, after several attempts, Ed Fletcher successfully sold the Cuyamaca Water Company to the La Mesa, Lemon Grove and Spring Valley Irrigation District for $1.4 million on January 4, 1926.
