= Ralf Marc Walker =

American businessperson

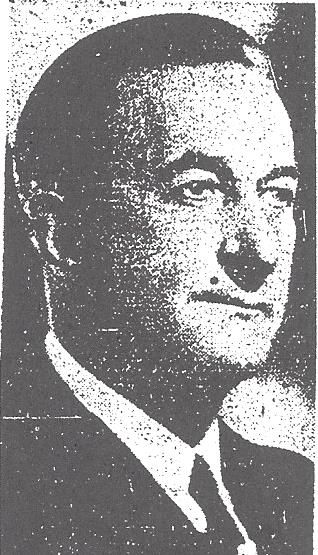
- Born: May 20, 1872; Bellevue Township, Eaton County, Michigan
- Died: August 28, 1935 (aged 63); New York City
- Resting place: Forest Lawn Memorial Park (Glendale); 34.125°N 118.240°W
- Occupations: Department store owner and executive
- Organization(s): The Broadway, Los Angeles; Fifth Street Store, Los Angeles; Walker Scott, San Diego

Ralf Marc (R.M.) Walker (May 20, 1872 Bellevue Township, Eaton County, Michigan — August 28, 1935, New York City, buried Glendale, California) was an American department store executive.

In his native Bellevue, Michigan, Walker worked in a grocery store for a certain Mr. C. D. Kimberley. He would later spend time in Wisconsin and Detroit before heading to Los Angeles where Arthur Letts trained him at Letts' Broadway department store, Walker was the co-founder/co-worker owner of the 125,000-square-foot department store known as the Fifth Street Store at Fifth and Broadway in downtown Los Angeles, established in 1905. Walker also owned what would later become known as the Houdini Mansion in Laurel Canyon. He died six months before the opening in San Diego of the first Walker Scott store – which would go on to become a regional chain – on October 3, 1935.
