= Escondido Village Mall =

Shopping mall in California, United States

Coordinates: 33.1303°N 117.0645°W

Escondido Village at Valley Boulevard (now Valley Parkway) and Ash Street in Escondido, California, was the first enclosed, and first fully air-conditioned, shopping mall in California, opening in 1964, and costing $10 million to build. It was advertised as a shopping center with an "enclosed sidewalk" or "an air-conditioned sidewalk and mall"; the term "mall" was not yet synonymous with an enclosed shopping center, and was used in its original meaning of "a long, planted or green space". Walker Scott, the San Diego–based department store chain, was an anchor, as was Mayfair Markets, with TG&Y discount stores joining later. At launch, the center was 1,200-foot (370 m) long on a single-axis mall, had 200,000 square feet (19,000 m^{2}) of gross leasable area, 40 stores, and 30 acres (120,000 m^{2}) of parking for 1,250 cars. Sears joined later as the second department store anchor, adding 120,000 sq ft (11,000 m^{2}).

The center had its official opening on August 6, 1964. Prior to then, several tenants had already opened for business:

- Alfredo's Restaurant
- Mayfair Market
- San Diego Trust and Savings
- Ting's Drugs
- Walker Scott
- Union Oil Service

Stores opening on August 6 were:

- Benbough's Furniture
- Bon Ton ice cream shop
- Bradley's Continental Coiffures
- Flynn's Candies
- Fraser's
- Hafter's-Haggarty
- House of Fabrics
- Leona Ray Sportswear
- Frances Formals—
  Little Fawn bridal shop
- Master's Candy
- Motherhood Shops
- Peter Pan (youth fashions)
- Polynesian Pet Shop
- Radio Station KOWN
- Rogers Barber Shop
- Rusty's Gifts
- T. G. & Y Variety
- The Ivy Shop (men's wear)
- Tish's Book and Art Gallery
- Valley Donut Shop

Stores with a planned opening after August 6 were:

- Village Nutrition
- Gallenkamp Shoes
- Joseph Jewelers
- Streicher's Shoes
- Sir George's Smorgasbord
- Chuck's Steak House
- Aunt Emma's Pancake House

== Walker Scott Escondido ==
The 60,000 sq ft (5,600 m^{2}) Walker Scott store, the chain's fifth, cost $3,750,000, and officially opened with a ribbon cutting at 11 a.m. on April 6, 1964, ahead of the center's formal opening on August 6. Designed by Brand-Worth & Associates, the store had numerous notable features. Walls, floors and fixtures were color coordinated. The signage was custom-made in a classic raised Roman typeface.

=== Carpet ===
The store featured a specially-made multi-color carpet in eight related shades around the perimeter of the store, in a progressive spectrum from red to blue. The men's department carpet was dark blue, the dress department reds and purples, the juniors and lingerie departments pink and orchid colors, and in ladies' sportswear, vermilion and lavender.

=== Walls ===
The store had wall murals in classic Roman themes by Rick Chase, a Southern California muralist. Other walls were covered in metal sculptures, including acid-etched brass trees in recesses in the walls of the apparel areas. In the sportswear department, three sculptured metal trees were made with more than 9,000 stylized leaves. Decorative grill work enclosed the glass well of the escalators.

== Anchor changes ==
Walker Scott and Sears (relocated to North County Fair mall) both closed in 1986, with Fedco taking the Sears space and expanding it to 215,000 sq ft (20,000 m^{2}). (now the site of The Home Depot).

== Transformation to strip-style center ==
The mall was transformed into an unenclosed strip-style neighborhood shopping center in 1991 to improve its competitive position after losing business to North County Fair, which opened in 1986.
