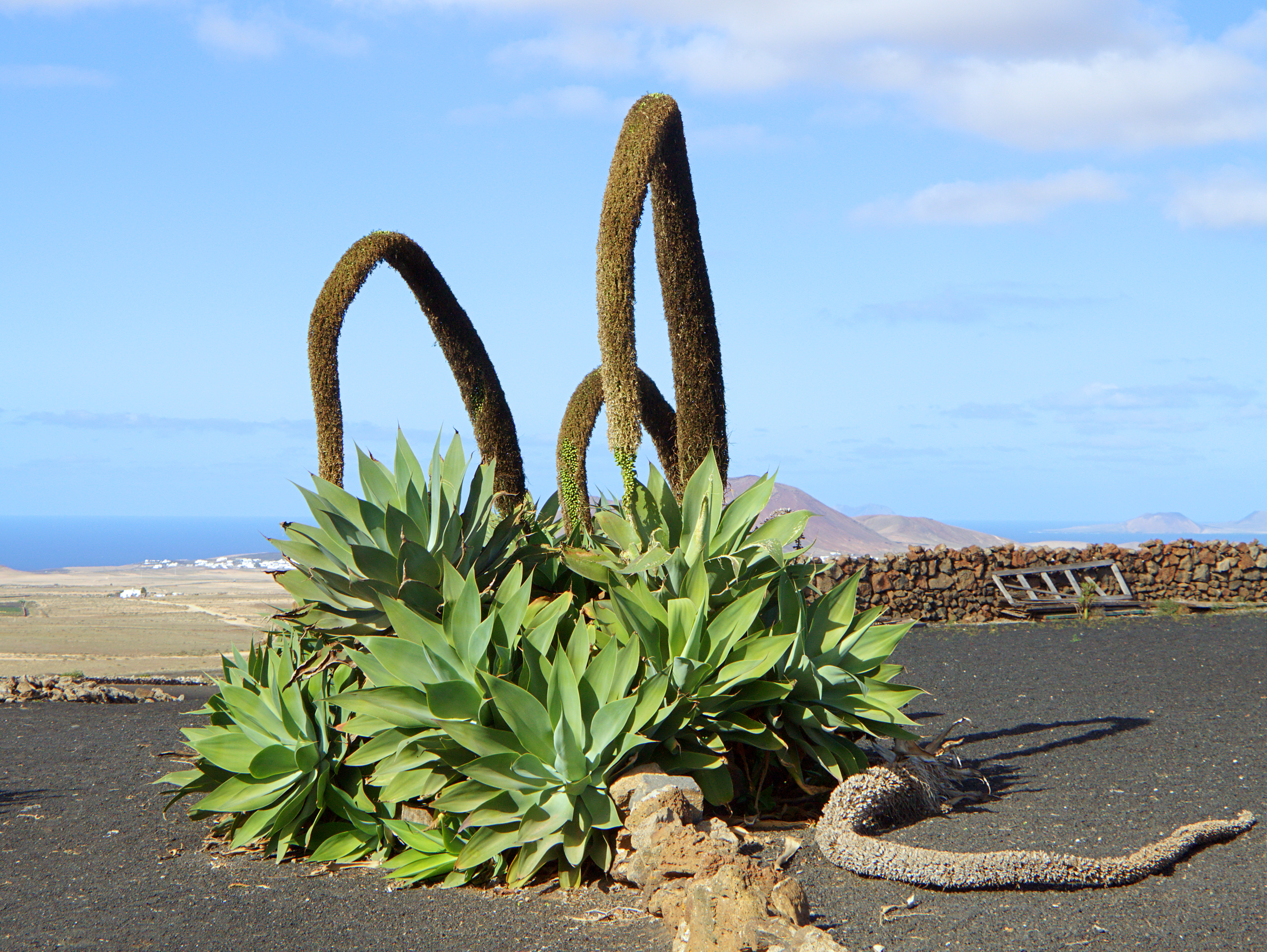

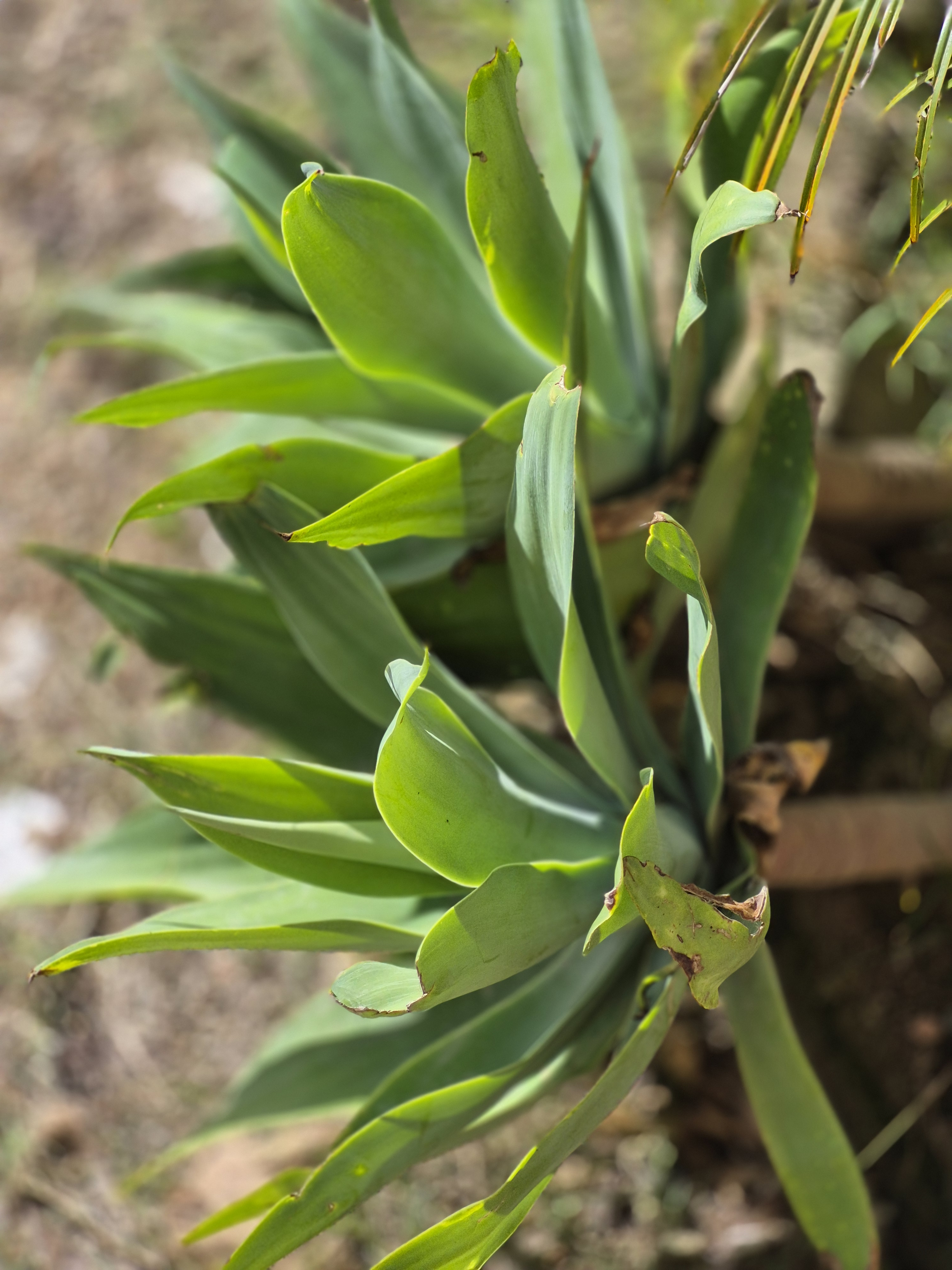
- A. attenuata in Brazil

Conservation status
- Least Concern (IUCN 3.1)

Scientific classification
- Kingdom: Plantae
- Clade: Tracheophytes
- Clade: Angiosperms
- Clade: Monocots
- Order: Asparagales
- Family: Asparagaceae
- Subfamily: Agavoideae
- Genus: Agave
- Species: A. attenuata

Binomial name
- Agave attenuata Salm-Dyck 1834

Synonyms
- Agave attenuata var. compacta Jacobi; Agave attenuata var. latifolia Salm-Dyck ex A.Terracc; Agave attenuata var. paucibracteata Trel.; Agave attenuata var. subdentata Cels ex Carrière; Agave attenuata var. subundulata Jacobi; Agave cernua A. Berger; Agave debaryana Jacobi; Agave glaucescens Hook.; Agave kellocki Jacobi; Agave pruinosa Lem. ex Jacobi; Ghiesbreghtia mollis Roezl. (invalid)

= Agave attenuata =

Species of flowering plant

Agave attenuata, commonly called the foxtail or lion's tail agave or the swan's neck agave, is a species of flowering plant in the family Asparagaceae (the asparaguses, agaves and yuccas). Sometimes called the soft-leaf or soft-leaved agave, the aforementioned animal-related names are a nod to the appearance of the plant's inflorescence, which—after years, generally—rises slightly before gravity brings it back down, giving the bloom a curved, "swan"-like or "foxtail" look. The species' specific manner of flowering is unique in the genus Agave as most other species produce a towering, vertical display, reminiscent of a miniature tree.

In addition to its inflorescence, when compared with other Agave species, A. attenuata is further unique with its soft, spineless leaves and the fact that it does not rapidly asexually produce dozens of "runners" or "pups" from the rhizome of the mother plant. These factors have helped A. attenuata earn a positive reputation amongst gardeners as easy-to-manage; the species has become extremely popular as an ornamental plant in appropriate climates and zones, especially the American Southwest, Latin America and the Mediterranean.

Several unique forms and cultivars have been created and made available on the plant market, such as the white-variegated A. attenuata 'Variegata' and 'Ray of Light', or the teal-hued 'Boutin Blue'. The similarly teal-leaved 'Blue Flame' was achieved with the cross of Agave attenuata x Agave shawii.

== Description ==
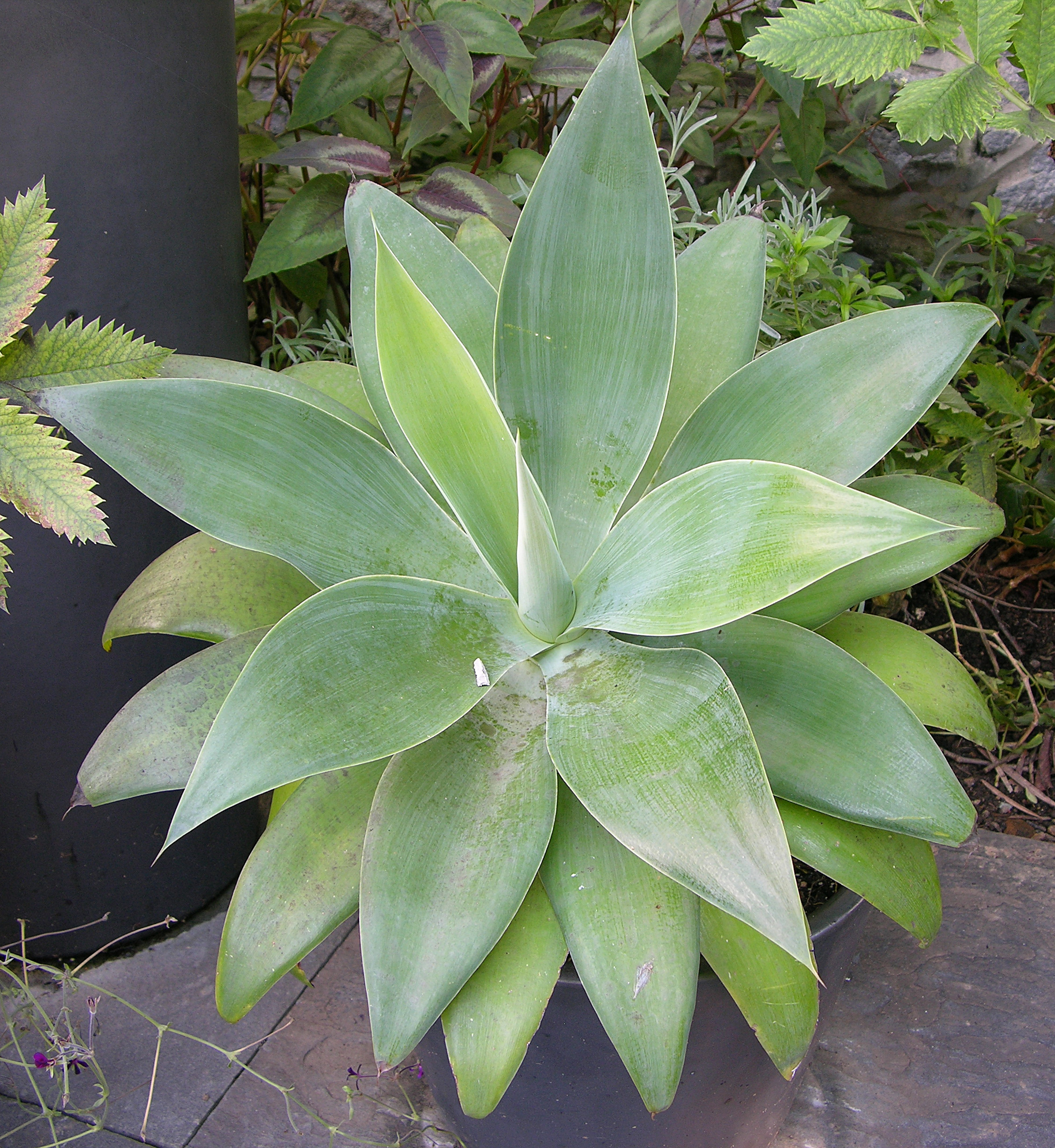

Although particularly young or smaller plants can appear acaulescent, stems often mature to between 50 and 150 cm (20 and 59 in) in length, with older, desiccated leaves falling off and leaving the woody stems visible. The leaves are ovate-acuminate, 50–70 cm (20–28 in) long and 12–16 cm (5–6 in) wide, pale in color, ranging from a light gray to a light yellowish-green. There are neither teeth, nor terminal spines, although the leaves taper to soft points that fray with age. The numerous, broad, succulent, tapering leaves are slightly less rigid than the leaves of most Agave species; they are a bright glaucous gray to light yellowish-green and stingless.

The inflorescence is a dense raceme 2.5 to 3 meters (8.2 to 9.8 ft) high (usually curved), with greenish-yellow flowers, developing after many years. As with other Agave species, the species is monocarpic, meaning that, rather than sending flowers out from the side of its stem and continuing living (like the succulent genera Crassula or Sedum, for example), the entire rosette morphs into the giant inflorescence. After many months, this blossom subsequently dies following pollination and seed development, although numerous plantlets consequently sprout, both from the base of the plant and from the flower raceme. In nature, when the inflorescence finally dries and falls to the ground, the young plants growing from it will inevitably root into the ground, thus forming a brand-new colony.

It has two subspecies:

- A. attenuata ssp. attenuata: Native to Central and Southwest Mexico and naturalized in Madeira and Libya.
- A. attenuata ssp. dentata (J.Verschaff.) B.Ullrich: Native to Northwest and Southwest Mexico.

== Etymology ==
The Latin specific epithet attenuata means "with a narrow point".

== Range ==
Specimens were sent to Kew Gardens by the explorer Galeotti in 1834 from an unspecified location in central Mexico. A more recent study has reported it from Jalisco, on the west coast and east of Mexico State, in small colonies at elevations between 1,900 to 2,500 meters (6,200 to 8,200 ft), but there have been few sightings, suggesting this species is rare in the wild. IUCN reports the species from the states of Colima, Durango, Guerrero, Jalisco, Michoacán, Nayarit and Mexico State, at altitudes between 400 and 2,500 meters (1,300 and 8,200 ft) on volcanic rock cliffs within pine forests and transitional zones of tropical dry and temperate forests types in mountains. It is reportedly naturalized in Libya and Madeira and is widely spread through the Mediterranean and the rest of Macaronesia.

== Cultivation ==
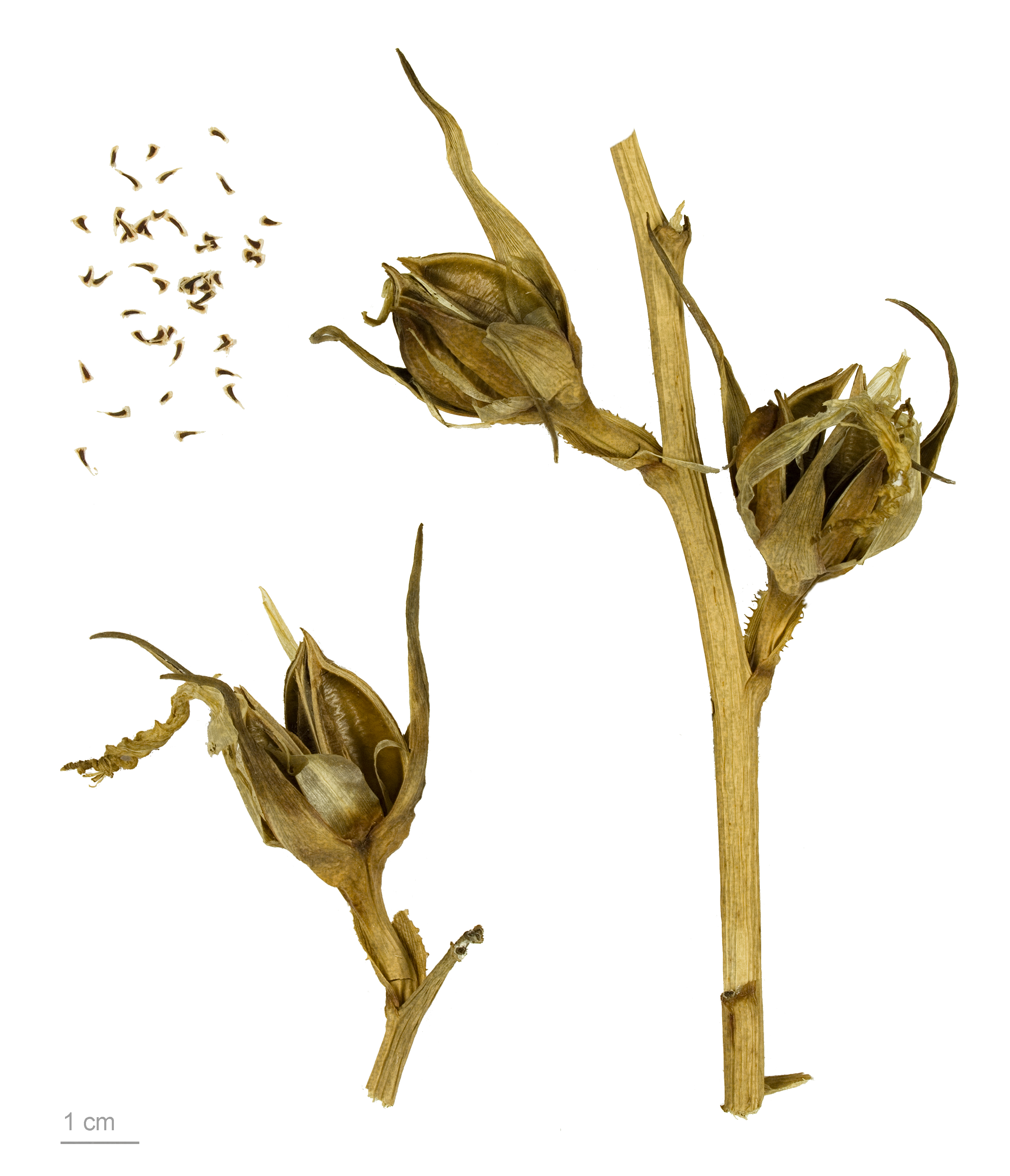
Dry seed capsules and seeds - MHNT

In cultivation, Agave attenuata is said to prefer relatively moist loamy soil, although it can cope with poor soil and dry conditions. It should be protected from direct sunlight in summer and from long periods of frost. It is hardy down to USDA Zone 9b.

== Gallery ==
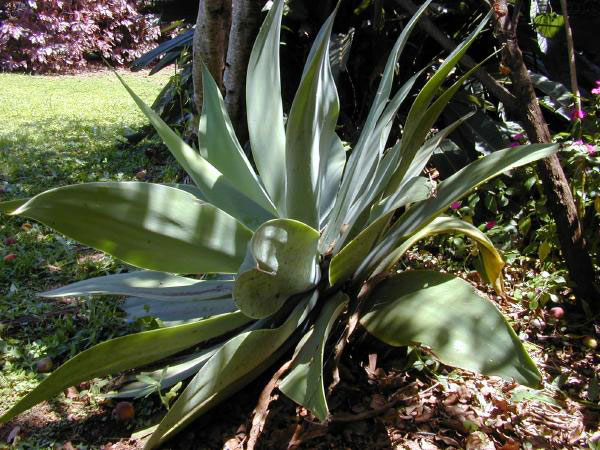
Leaning, as its inflorescence matures.

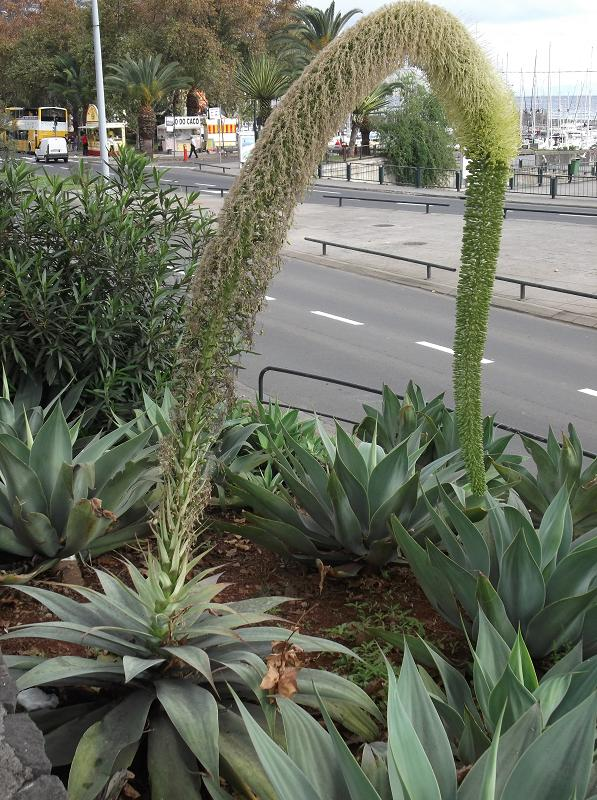
Flower raceme.

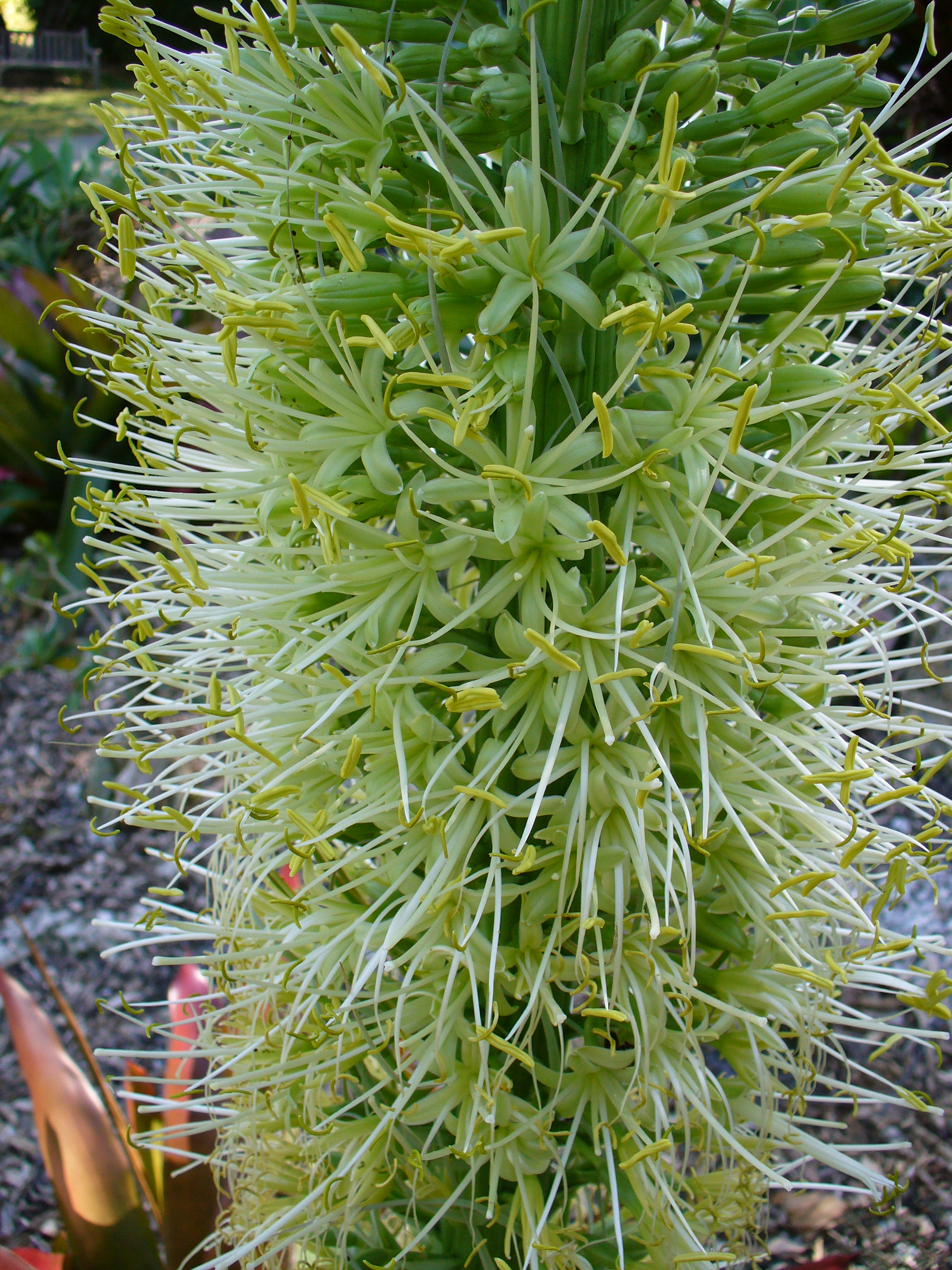
Flowers (close-up).

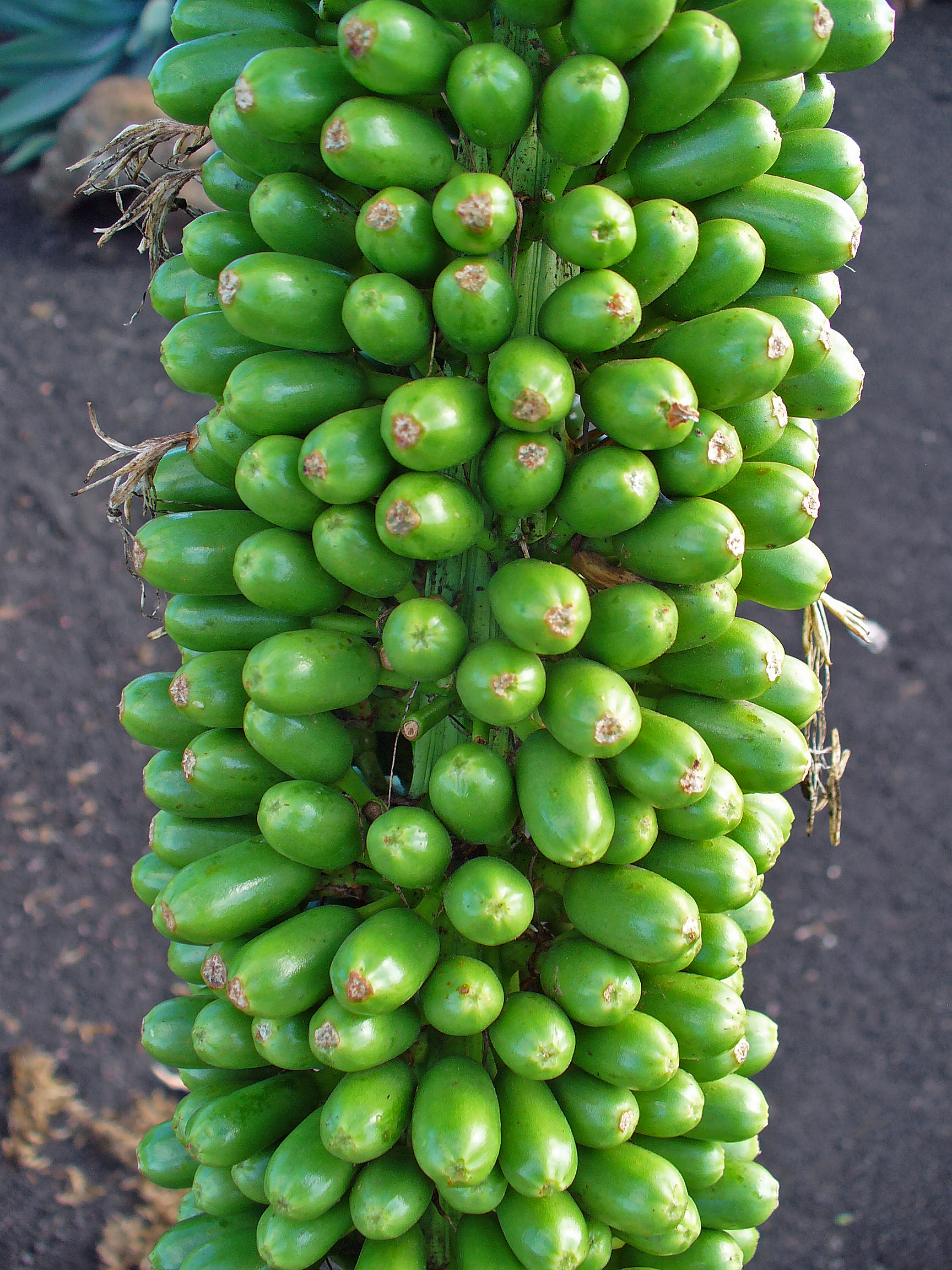
Fruits developing following pollination.

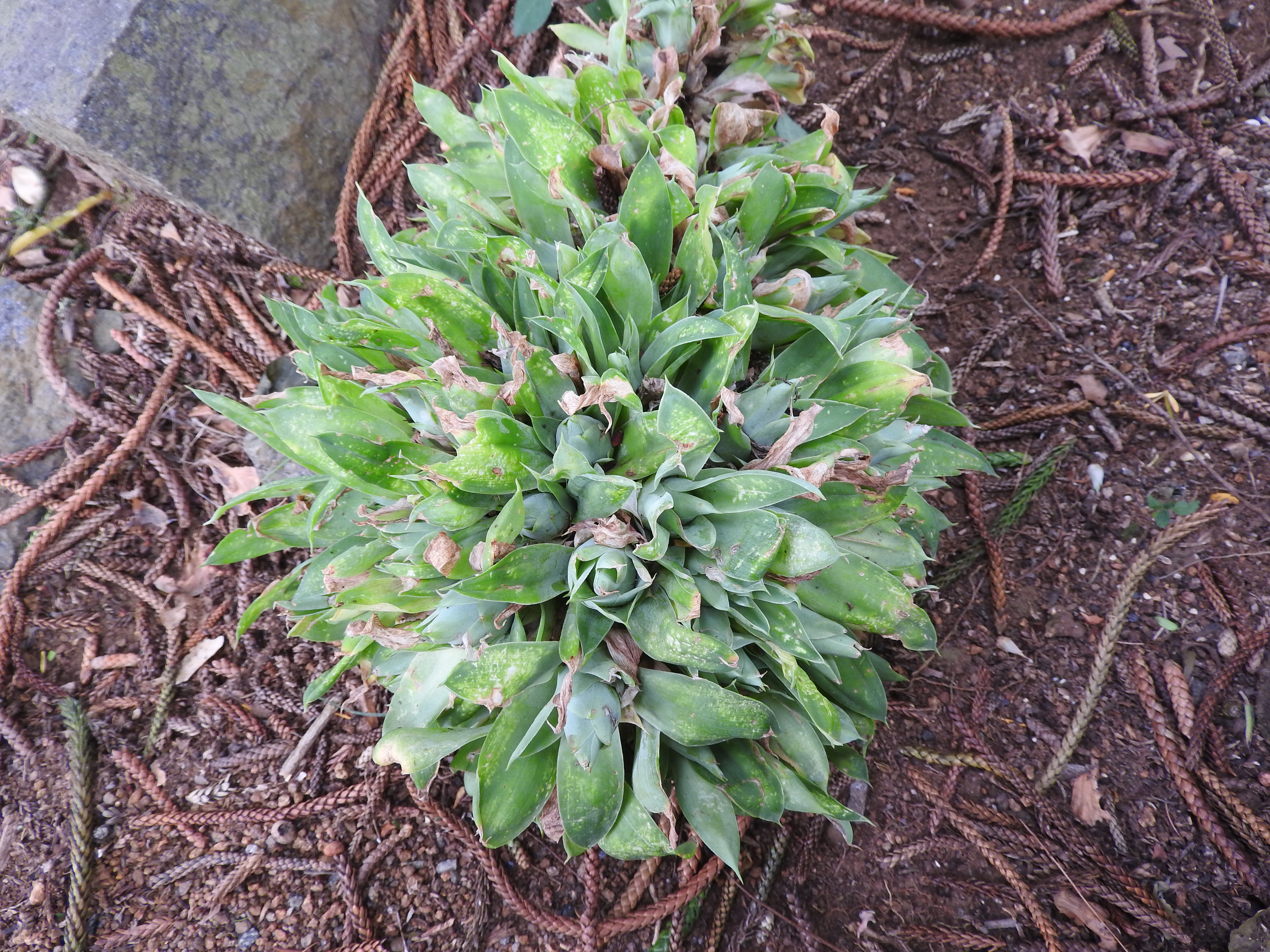
Cluster of A. attenuata starting to form their flower spikes (overhead view).

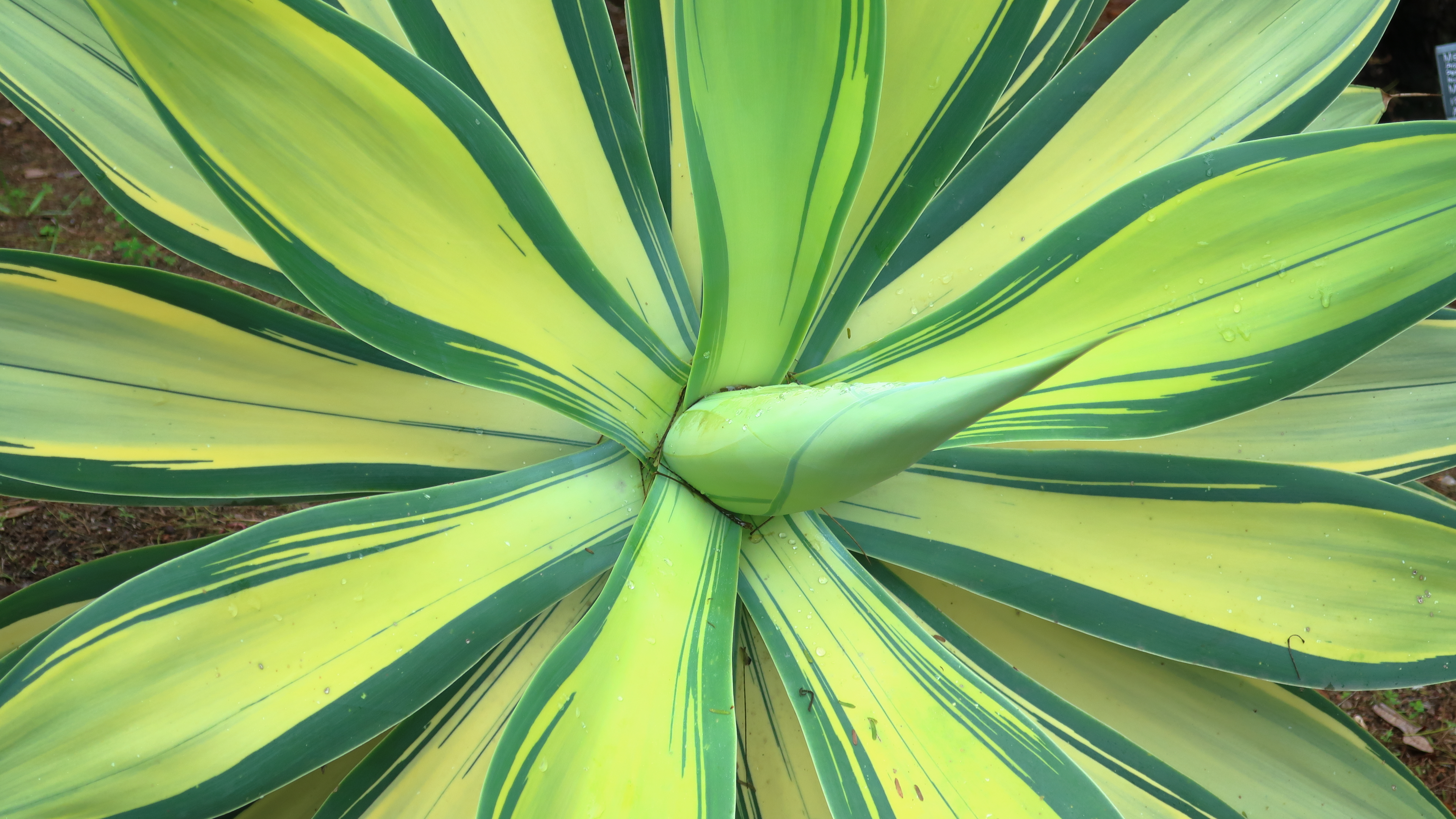
A. attenuata 'Variegata' at San Diego Botanic Garden.

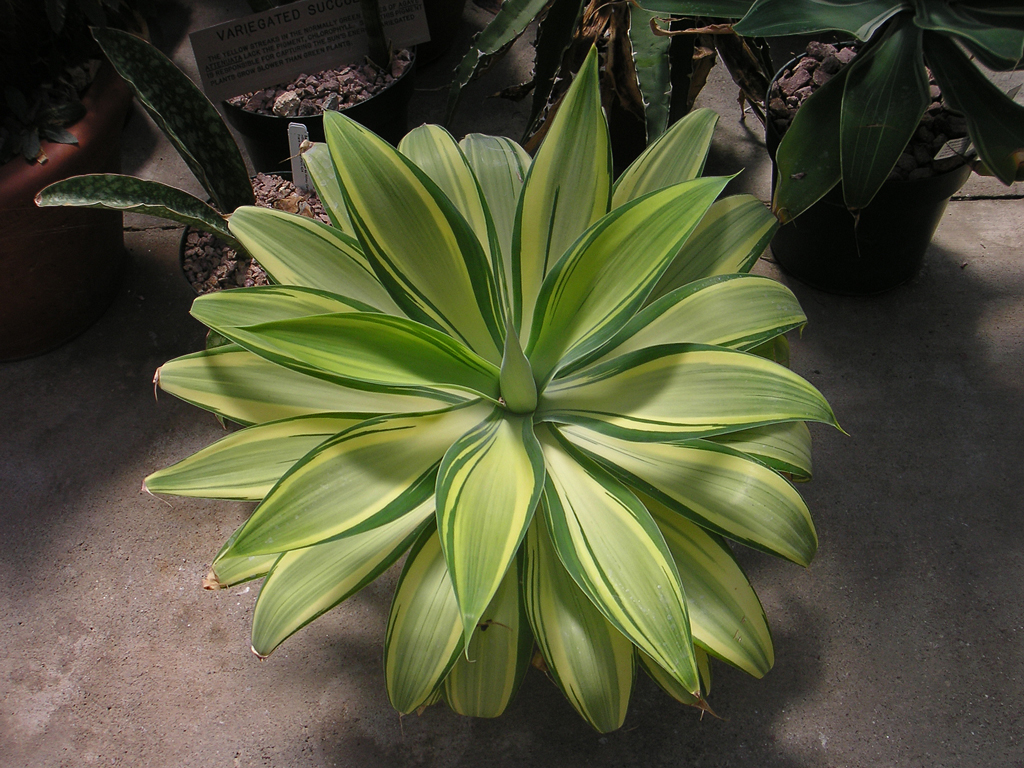
'Ray of Light'.

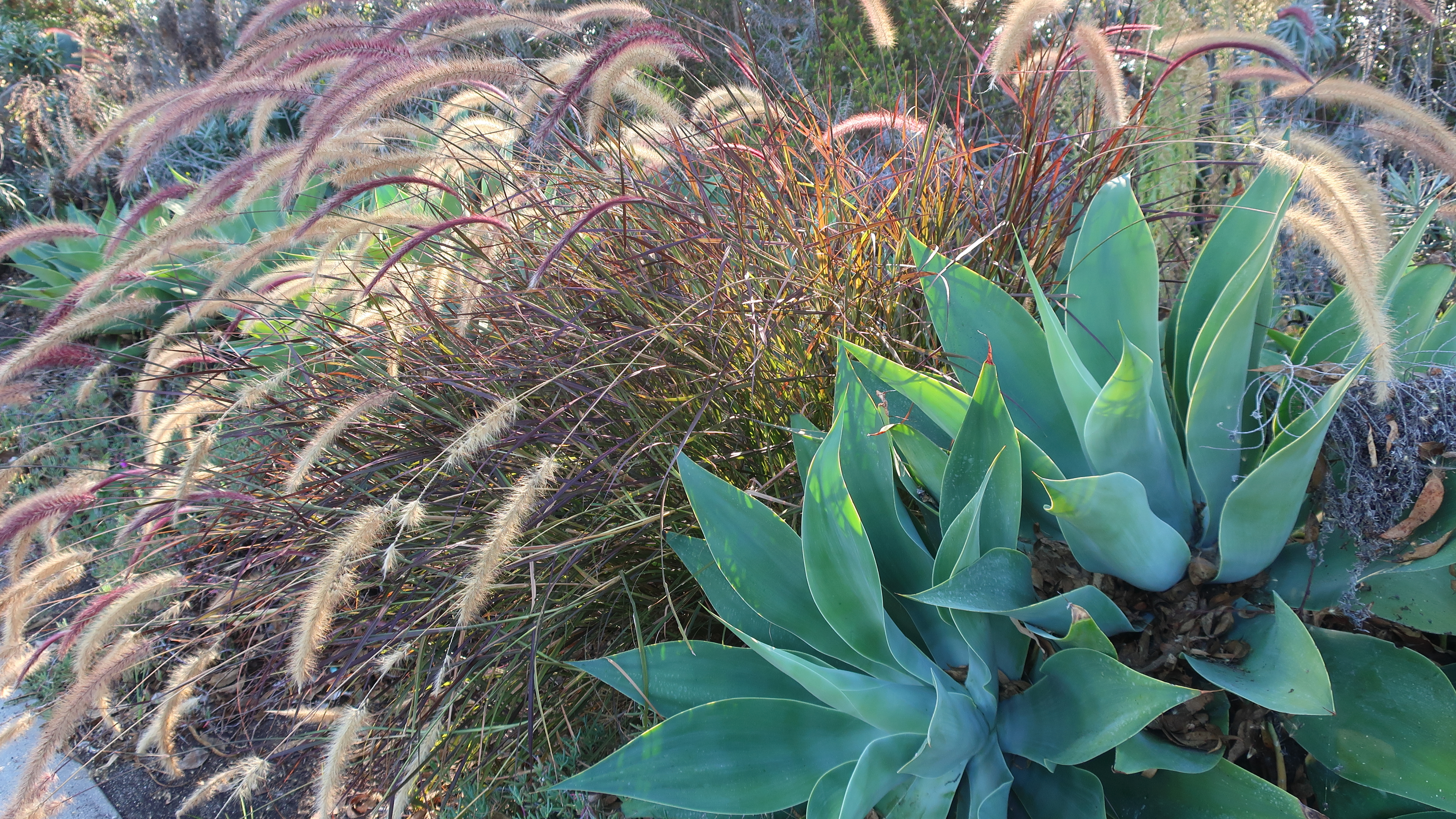
'Boutin Blue' in display bed at SD Botanic Garden.

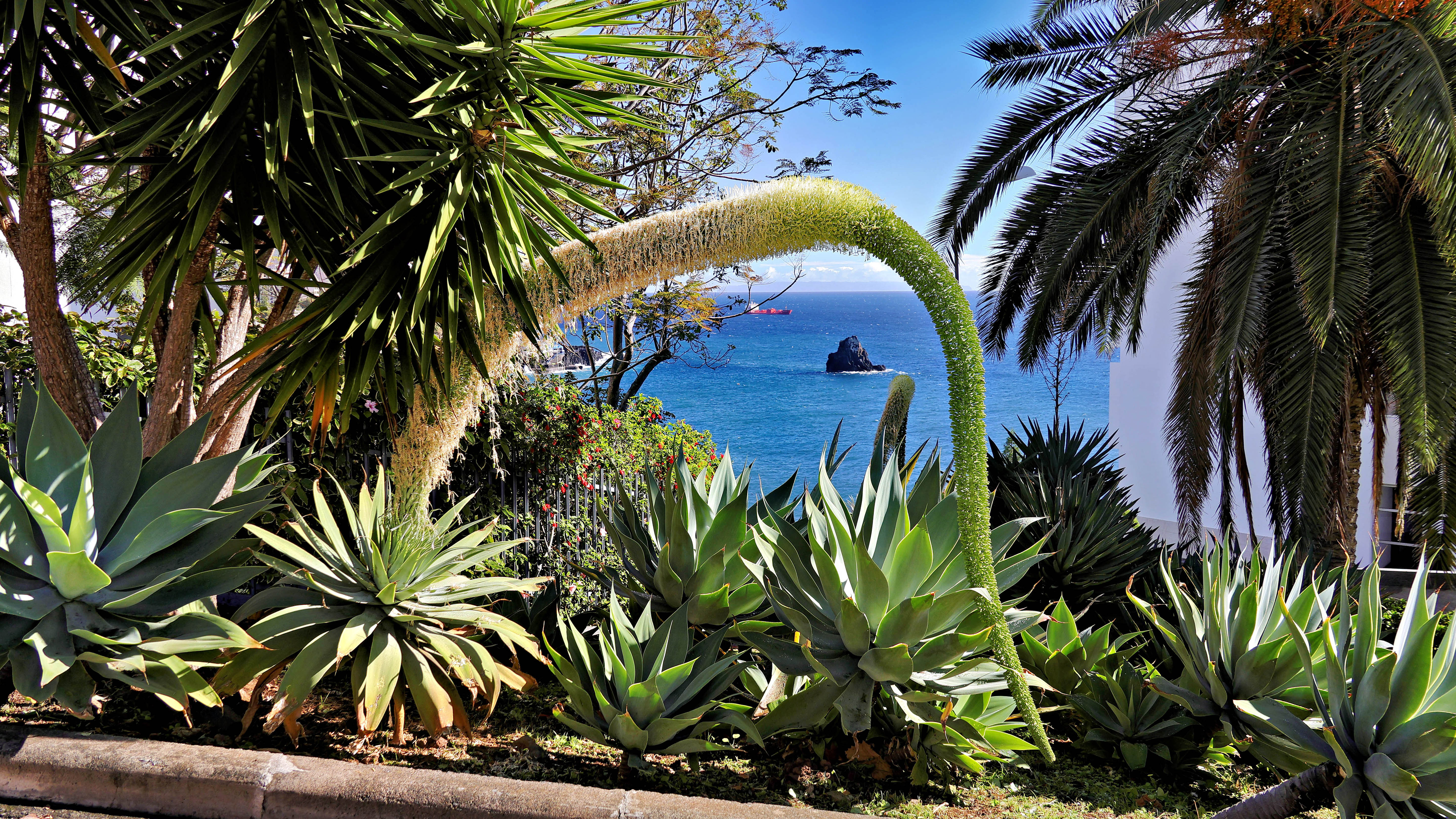
on Madeira

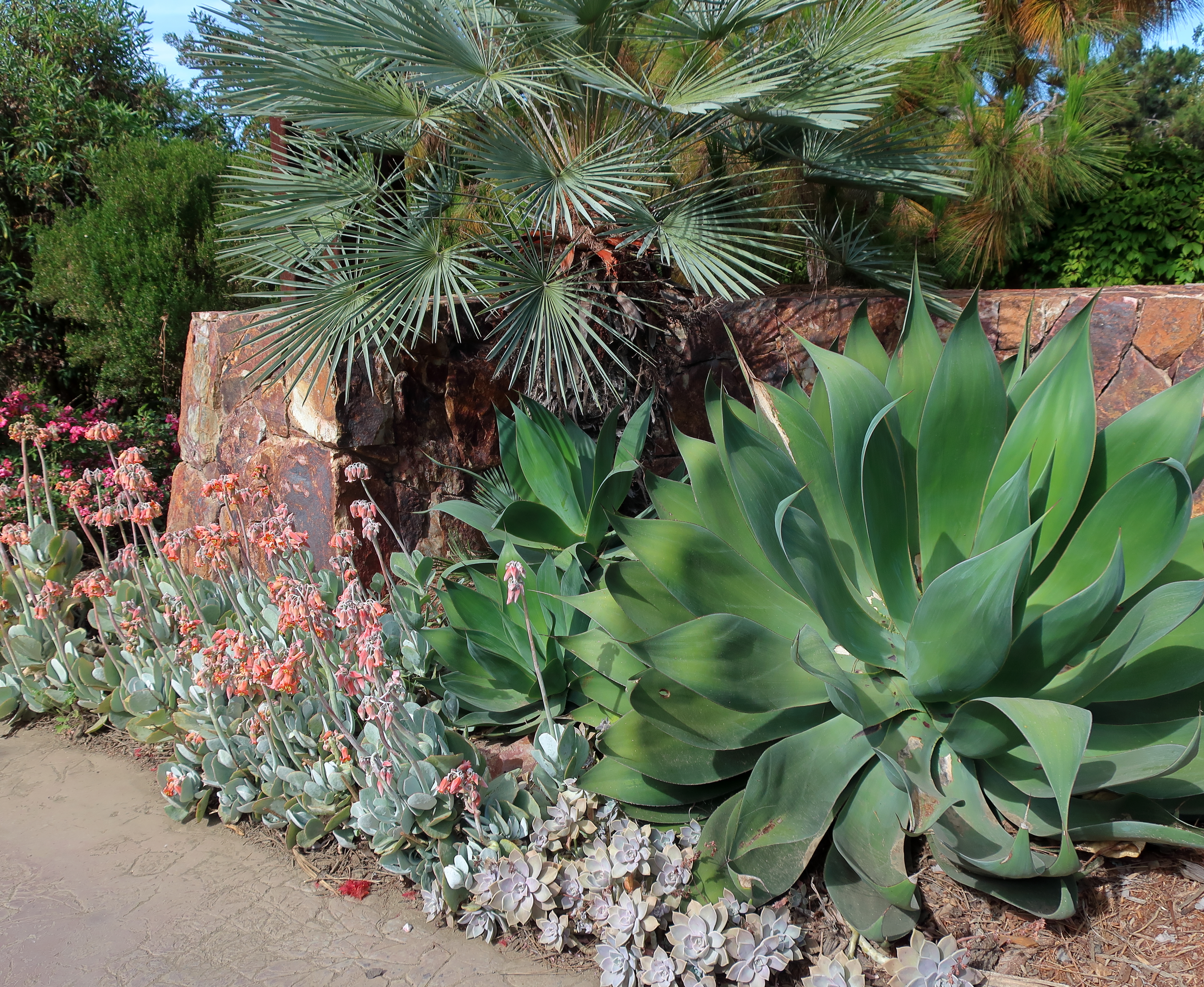
A. attenuata x A. shawii 'Blue Flame'
