= Walker Scott =

Former department store chain

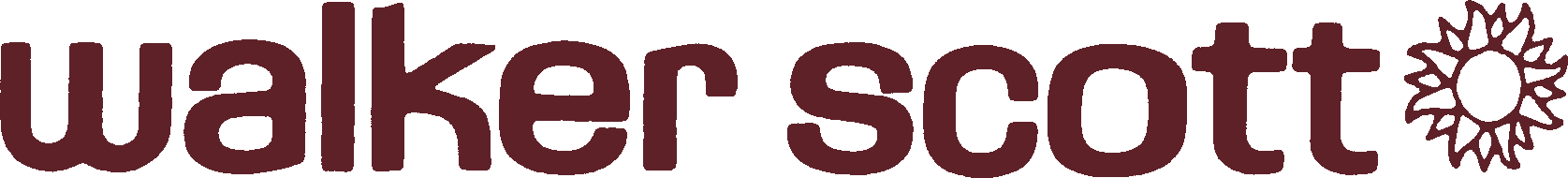
Walker Scott logo

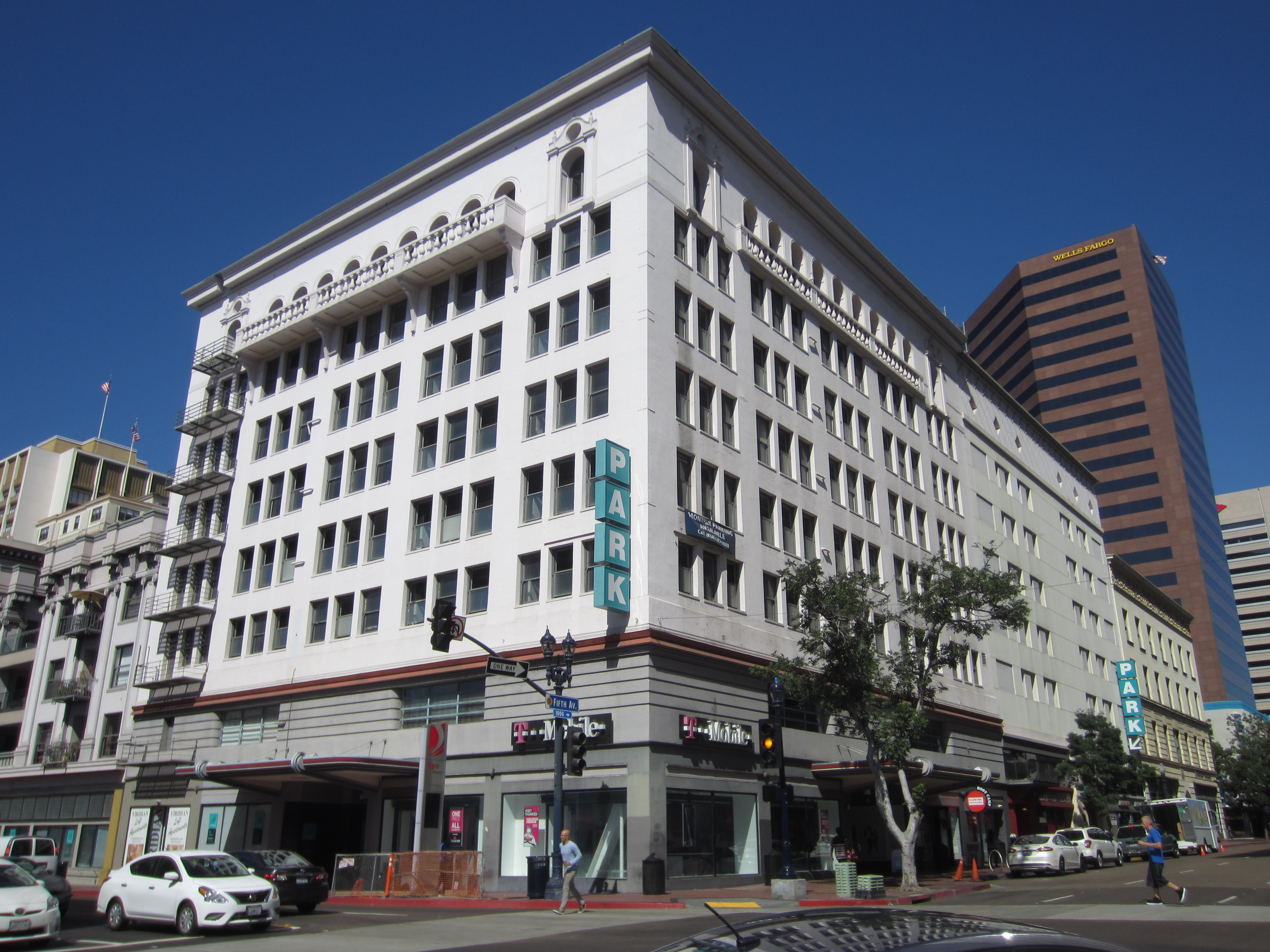
Former Walker Scott flagship store at Broadway and 5th, downtown San Diego, originally built for Holzwasser's in 1919

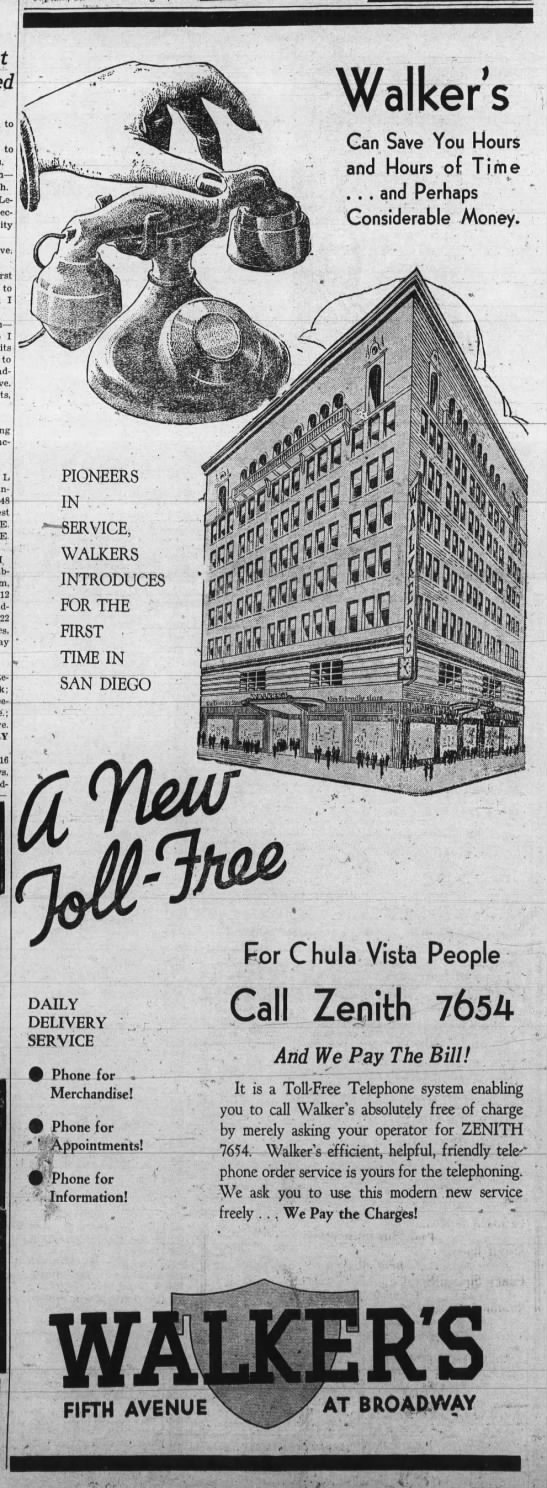
1935 Walker's ad in the Chula Vista Star

Walker Scott, also Walker-Scott or Walker's, was a chain of department stores in San Diego and surrounding area from 1935 to 1986 and had eight branches at the time of its closure. It was founded by Ralf Marc (or R.M.) Walker and George A. Scott.

== History ==
Trained under Arthur Letts at Los Angeles' Broadway department store, Ralf Marc Walker was the co-founder/co-worker owner of the 125,000-square-foot department store known as the Fifth Street Store at Fifth and Broadway in downtown Los Angeles, established in 1905. Walker also owned what would later become known as the Houdini Mansion in Laurel Canyon. He died six months before the opening of the San Diego store on October 3, 1935.

George A. Scott (b. Scotland, 1907 — d. United States, 1993) was a protégé of Walker, who had sent him to the New York University of Retailing and had treated him as a son; the two men had a very close personal relationship.

=== Downtown flagship ===
In 1935, the former Holzwasser's department store building, in San Diego's downtown shopping district at the northwest corner of 5th and Broadway, had been sitting empty for over two years after the 1933 liquidation of Holzwasser's, once San Diego's largest department store. The Spanish Colonial Revival building had been built in 1919; John Terrel Vawter was the architect.

Scott and Walker traveled to San Diego to investigate the possibilities of opening a branch of Walker's in the ex-Holzwasser space, and decided to do so. They renovated the interior and the first and second floors of the exterior; the Quayle Brothers were the architects for this renovation. Seven days before the planned grand opening, Walker died, on September 25, 1935.

Seven days later, on October 2, Scott opened the store with Mr. Walker's widow, Eliza Fitzgerald Walker, who became president of the company while Scott took the position of vice president. Present at the opening reception were Arthur H. Marston, son of George W. Marston, who had attended the Holzwasser's opening fifteen years before, and Charles S. Holzwasser, who had owned the by-then-defunct Holzwasser store that had occupied the site.

The store employed 503 people at opening of which 482 were local from San Diego. First year sales volume was $800,000. Escalators were added and the store was expanded into the Owl Drug building to the west. in 1954, the store was renamed Walker Scott.

=== 1969-70 chain expansion ===
Three full-line stores opened in the 1970 fiscal year, and sales for that year were around $36 million, with earnings of $850,000. There were 525,000 square feet (48,800 m^{2}) of retail space across the stores, with an expected 70% increase in the year to follow, with new stores planned for Solana Beach, Palm Springs, Genessee Shopping Center in Clairemont, City of Orange (The City Shopping Center), Point Loma at Sport Arena Way Shopping Center, a small store in Coronado and College Grove Shopping Center near Lemon Grove.

=== Winding-down ===
In 1984-5 Walker Scott eliminated major-appliance departments and de-emphasizing hardline areas such as housewares and small appliances. In January 1985, facing competition from other stores, the firm closed its downtown and La Jolla stores, leaving it with 12 outlets. Later that same year, Walker Scott sold to Los Angeles retailer Desmond's & Associates. In November 1986 Walker Scott closed its remaining stores.

== Branches ==
Branches and their years of opening:

- 1935 downtown San Diego, 1014 Fifth Avenue, NW corner of 5th and Broadway (formerly Holzwasser's department store)
- 1959 La Jolla (Walker's purchased Stevenson's Department Store, which it operated under its original name for a time). Closed in 1985.
- 1960 College Grove Shopping Center, in eastern San Diego adjacent to Lemon Grove; upon opening it was the largest Walker's store.
- 1963 Linda Vista Shopping Center
- 1964 Escondido Village: The 60,000 sq ft (5,600 m^{2}) cost $3,750,000, and officially opened with a ribbon-cutting at 11 A.M. on Monday, April 6, 1964. The store's interior design was by Brand-Worth & Associates. Walls, floors and fixtures were color coordinated. The signage was custom-made in classic raised Roman alphabet. The store featured a specially-made multi-color carpet in eight related shades around the perimeter of the store, in a progressive spectrum from red to blue. The men's department carpet was dark blue, the dress department reds and purples, the juniors and lingerie departments pink and orchid colors, and in ladies' sportswear, vermilion and lavender. There were wall murals in classic Roman themes by Rick Chase, a Southern California muralist. Other walls were covered in metal sculptures, including acid-etched brass trees in recesses in the walls of the apparel areas. In the sportswear department, three sculptured metal trees were made with more than 9,000 stylized leaves. Decorative grill work enclosed the glass well of the escalators.
- 1968 Clairemont and El Cajon (bought Whitney's Department Stores and operated them by that name for a time). Clairemont store was relocated to Clairemont Square. A third Whitney's outlet was converted to a Walker-Scott home and gift center.
- 1970, added fabric stores in Lakeside, Ocean Beach (later a men's a women's sportswear specialty shop) and El Cajon
- 1970 City of Orange, The City shopping center, 160,000 sq. ft., replaced by May Company in 1974.
- 1970 Palm Springs (Palm Springs Mall), replaced by Buffums in 1989, later Harris Gottschalks in 1990.
- 1970: Solana Beach, Lomas Santa Fe Plaza, which in 1988 or 1989 was bought by and opened as Buffums
- 1973 San Carlos
- 1973 Mission Valley Shopping Center
- 1975 Mira Mesa, 63,000 square feet (5,900 m^{2})
- 1976 Oceanside
- 1982 National City
- 1983 Pacific Beach
