= Ed Fletcher =

American politician (1872–1955)

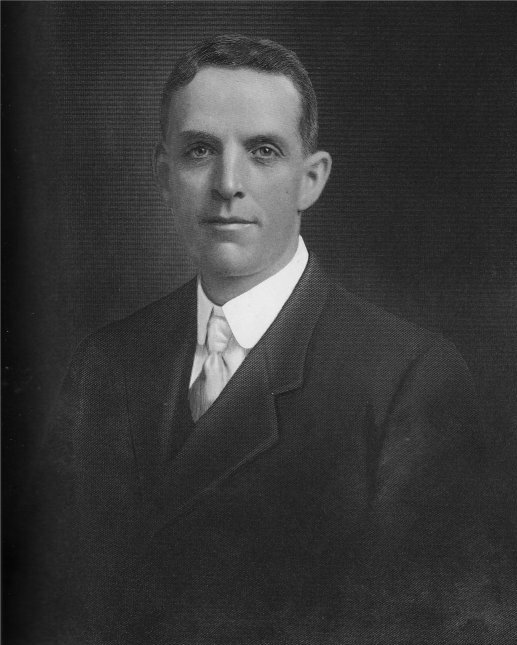

Member of the California Senate from the 40th district
- In office January 7, 1935 – January 6, 1947
- Preceded by: William E. Harper
- Succeeded by: Fred H. Kraft

Personal details
- Born: December 31, 1872 Littleton, Massachusetts, U.S.
- Died: October 15, 1955 (aged 82) San Diego, California, U.S.
- Party: Republican
- Spouse: Mary C. Batchelder (after 1896)
- Children: 10, including Charles

Military service
- Branch/service: California National Guard
- Rank: Lieutenant Colonel

"Colonel" Ed Fletcher (December 31, 1872 – October 15, 1955) was an American real estate developer and politician.

== Early life and career ==
Fletcher was born on December 31, 1872, in Littleton, Massachusetts, son of Charles Kimball Fletcher. His family moved to Worcester and Boston, where he attended school. In 1888, Fletcher came to San Diego alone, and with $6.10 in his pocket began selling produce. He was a born salesman and soon had his own business with a partner. In 1901, he entered the real estate business as a land agent, and started a partnership in 1908 with William J. Gross, silent film actor and producer. That partnership developed Grossmont, Casa de Oro-Mount Helix, and Del Mar. Fletcher donated land on Mt. Helix where Easter Sunrise services are held. With George Marston, he developed Pine Hills.

In 1907, Fletcher was appointed Lieutenant Colonel of the California National Guard, which earned him the title "Colonel", which stuck for the remainder of his life. Fletcher became interested in road building and saw to it many road projects were completed. With Fred Jackson, Fletcher raised civic interest to building a road to Imperial Valley, thence a plank road across the desert to Yuma, Arizona. Fletcher was later active in having state and U.S. highways built to San Diego.

== San Diego area land development and water rights ==
Fletcher also took an interest in developing projects delivering water to San Diego, including creating Lake Hodges. Fletcher and Montana businessman James A. Murray purchased the San Diego Flume Company on June 1, 1910, renaming it the Cuyamaca Water Company. Fletcher and Murray owned and operated the company for 15 years, making or planning improvements to the water system of San Diego County including the construction of San Vicente Dam and San Vicente Reservoir, among others. Fletcher was a director of the Panama–California Exposition in 1915, and California Pacific International Exposition in 1935. After the 1915 Exposition, he raised funds to save the well-received temporary buildings from destruction. He also raised funds to buy land for the Naval Training Station in San Diego, and for building the YMCA.

In 1919, Fletcher was elected the first president of the Dixie Overland Highway Association. In 1923, Fletcher presided over a ceremony full of fanfare dedicating a commemorative highway milestone honoring Robert E. Lee at Horton Plaza Park in downtown San Diego. The monument marked the arrival of the Robert E. Lee Highway at the Pacific coast. President Calvin Coolidge was reported to have pushed a button in the White House that triggered a gong at the ceremony.

== Political career ==
In 1934, Fletcher was elected to the California State Senate, and served until January 6, 1947. Sometime while in the Senate, he switched his party affiliation from Republican to Democratic. He authored laws creating the San Diego County Water Authority and transferring ownership of Mission Bay to the city. While in the Senate he was able to acquire for San Diego a heroic statue of Juan Rodríguez Cabrillo, donated to the state in 1939 by the government of Portugal and claimed by both San Diego and Oakland. Fletcher personally "kidnapped" the statue from its storage in a garage at a private residence in Oakland; the statue is now on display at Cabrillo National Monument.

== Personal life ==
Fletcher married Mary C. Batchelder on April 8, 1896 in Ayer, Massachusetts. They had ten children, including Charles K. Fletcher, who would become a Congressman in 1947 and served until 1949. Fletcher died on October 15, 1955, aged 82, in San Diego.

== Recognition ==
Ed Fletcher's legacy includes a number of landmarks in the San Diego area. These include:

- Fletcher Parkway in La Mesa
- Fletcher Hills in El Cajon
- Fletcher Chimes of Hardy Memorial Tower at San Diego State University
- Fletcher Cove in Solana Beach
- Fletcher Point on the southern shore of Lake Hodges

== Colonel Fletcher Building ==
The Fletcher Building, located at Sixth and Broadway in San Diego, housed the Barnett-Stine department store and later the Owl Drug Company, was built by Fletcher in 1906 along with Frank Salmans, and designed by Edward Quayle. As of 2005 it was being remodeled by Champion Development Group.
