= The Valley (shopping mall) =

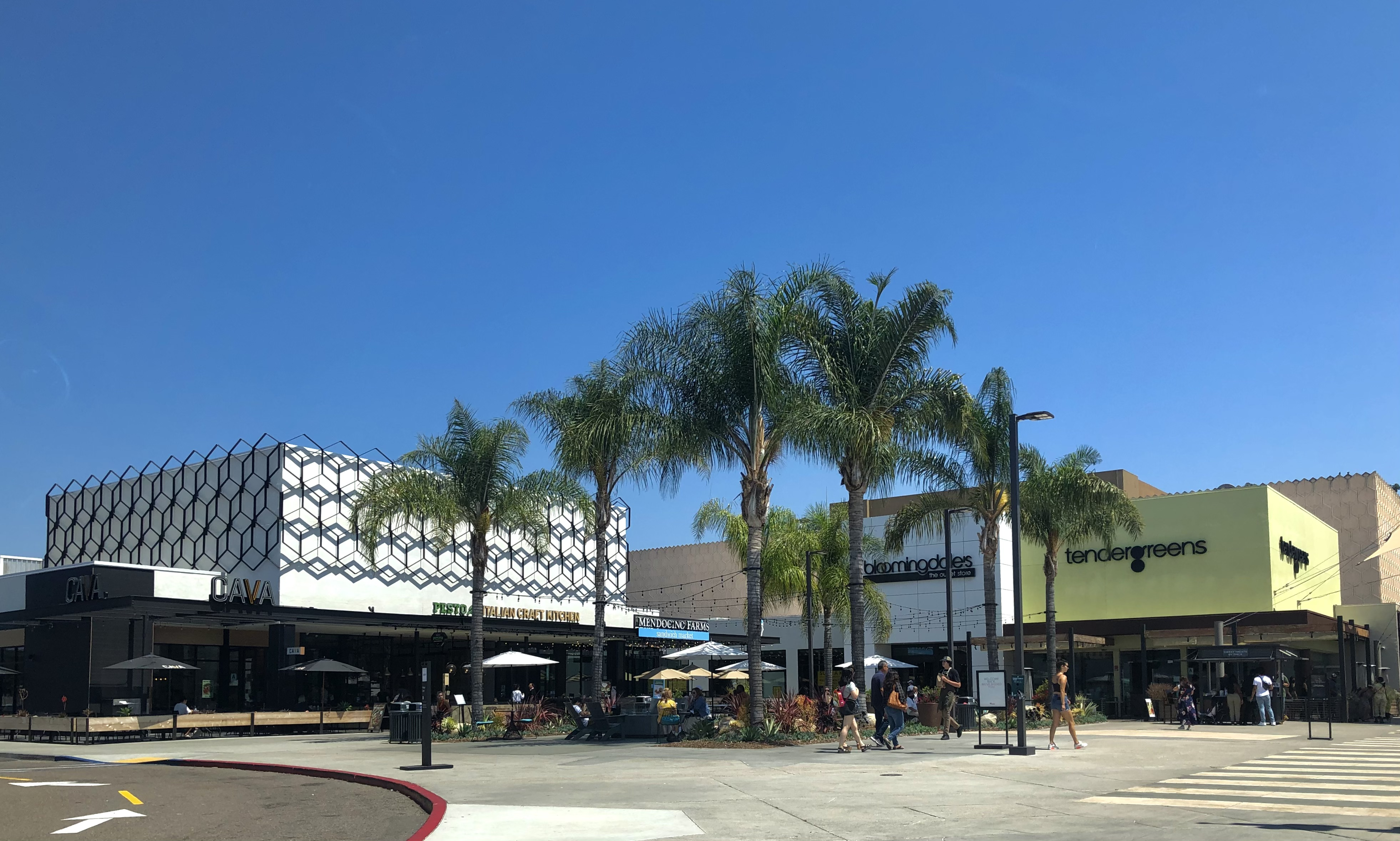
- Entrance from The Valley trolley station
- Location: San Diego, California
- Coordinates: 32°46′8″N 117°8′54″W
- Address: 1640 Camino Del Rio North, San Diego, CA 92108-1506
- Opened: February 20, 1961; 65 years ago
- Developer: May Centers, Inc.
- Manager: Centennial (Mission Valley East)
- Owner: Real Capital Solutions (Mission Valley East); Sunbelt Investment Holdings Inc. (Mission Valley West)
- Architect: Deems, Lewis, Martin & Associates
- Num. of stores: 100
- Num. of anchor tenants: 7 (6 open, 1 vacant)
- Floor area: 1,139,602 sq ft (105,872.5 m^{2})
- Floors: 1
- Parking: 7,181
- Public transit: Mission Valley Center
- Website: thevalleysd.com

The Valley (formerly Mission Valley Center, Mission Valley, and Westfield Mission Valley) is a retail complex consisting of a traditional open-air shopping mall owned by Real Capital Solutions and Lowe, and a power center owned by Sunbelt Investment Holdings Inc., in Mission Valley, San Diego. Mission Valley East was managed by the Dallas-based Centennial. Anchor stores include Michaels, Target, and Nordstrom Rack. Empty anchor buildings include the architecturally significant May Co. (later Macy's apparel) building, Bed Bath & Beyond (originally Saks Fifth Avenue). Another anchor space, Macy's Home & Furniture, closed on December 14, 2024.

The power center across Mission Center Road known as Mission Valley West is anchored by big box retailers like DSW Shoes, West Elm, Old Navy, Trader Joe's and Marshalls.

== History ==
1950s

In early 1958, May Centers proposed rezoning 90 acres (360,000 m^{2}) in the then sparsely populated Mission Valley area of San Diego to build a shopping mall. In June 1958, the San Diego City Council unanimously voted in favor of rezoning the 90 acres (360,000 m^{2}) for the May plan.

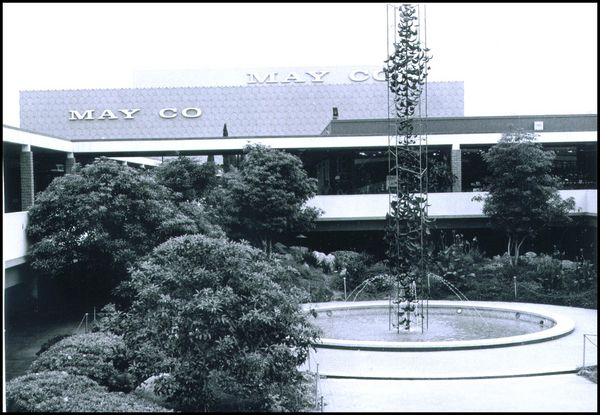
Center Courtyard at Mission Valley Center, 1961

1960s

By 1959, the mall was under construction, and it was completed in late 1960. The grand opening of the Mission Valley Center was held on February 20, 1961. Designed by the San Diego–based architectural firm Deems-Lewis, the mall contained two large anchor spaces, occupied by Montgomery Ward, and May Company, 70 inline stores, as well as a large central courtyard. Due to its location in the floodplain of the San Diego River, the mall was designed with stores on the level above the parking garage. Presumably, in the event of a flood, only the parking garage would be flooded, with the retail level untouched. It was San Diego's second mall, following the opening of the College Grove Center in 1960. National General Theatres Valley Circle Theater, part of the Mission Valley West strip center, opened on December 23, 1966.

1970s

The mall underwent its first expansion in 1975, with the completion of a new 3-story Bullock's.

1980s

In 1983, the mall underwent a significant remodel, with a new northeast wing built, which also added a two-story Saks Fifth Avenue. This helped mitigate the effect of a Mexican economic crisis and peso devaluation, as Mexican customers, who were estimated to make up about 15% of sales, were able to obtain fewer dollars with their pesos and thus had less to spend.

1990s

In 1993, May Company rebranded as Robinsons-May as the chain merged with J.W. Robinson's. Robinson's had a location at the nearby Fashion Valley Mall that also rebranded to that new name. In 1994, the Australian Westfield Group acquired the mall. They undertook another major renovation of the mall, with a new AMC Theatres 20-screen multiplex built atop the south parking lot. The renovation project also retrofitted several new stores in existing space in the northeast wing, including Michaels, Nordstrom Rack, Loehmann's, and Bed Bath & Beyond. Additionally, a large central courtyard, originally constructed as a children's playground, was covered over to provide space for a Ruby's Diner. Around this time, Macy's acquired the Bullock's chain of department stores, which led to a rebranding of the Bullock's as a Macy's (later became a Macy's Home and Furniture store since chain replaced The Broadway a month later at the nearby Fashion Valley Mall, moving all fashion departments to that location). Borders, Marshalls, DSW, The Good Guys, and Old Navy were added in 1995 in the adjacent power center, Mission Valley West. In 1998, the mall was renamed Westfield Shoppingtown Mission Valley

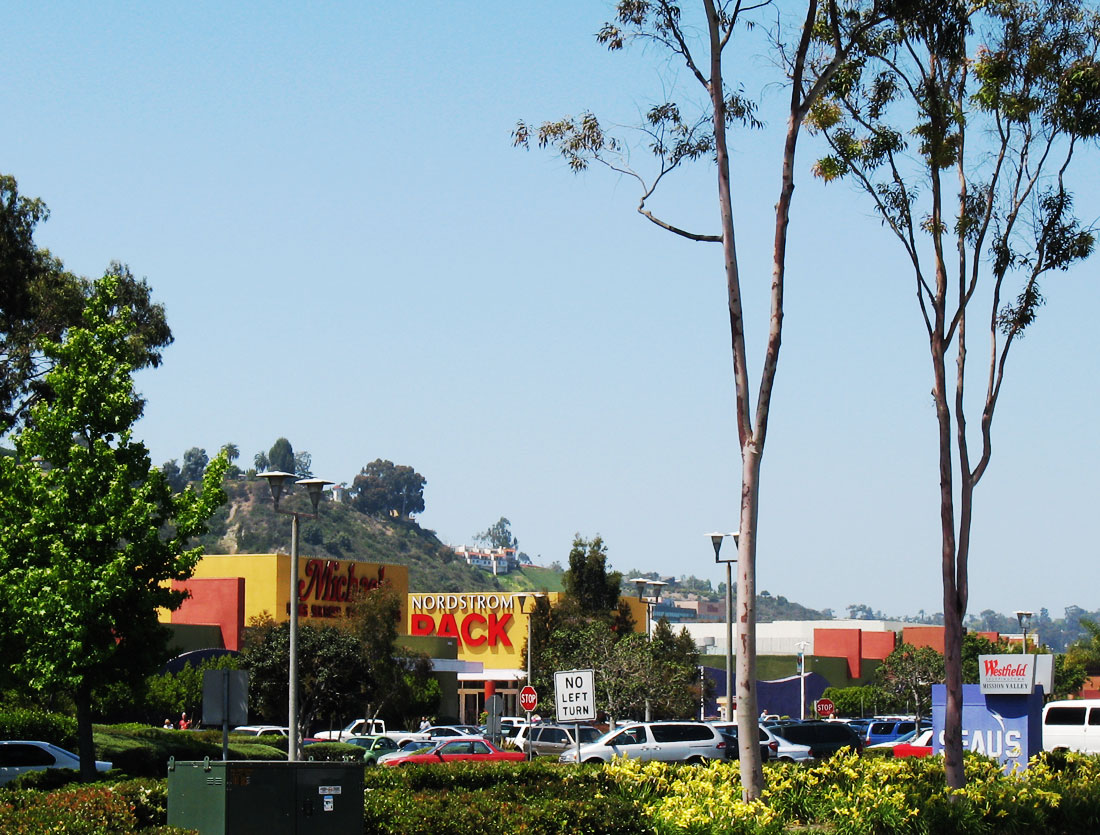
Westfield Mission Valley in 2006 before being painted Gray in 2008.

2000s

In 2001, one of the mall's original tenants, Montgomery Ward, was shuttered when the chain went bankrupt. A year later, Target opened in the former Ward's space. The Good Guys closed in 2005, and it was replaced by Golfsmith a year later in the power center. In June 200, the "Shoppingtown" moniker was dropped, and the mall became Westfield Mission Valley. In 2006, Macy's completed its acquisition of May Company, and the former Robinsons-May store was subsequently rebranded as Macy's. In August 2008, Westfield Group applied for a major renovation to the Westfield Mission Valley shopping center. The project envisioned a 500,000 sq ft (46,000 m^{2}) expansion of retail space for stores, 50,000 sq ft (4,600 m^{2}) of commercial space, adjacent condominiums and parking. Real estate industry experts expect the project to be long-term, and development to last five to ten years. However, as of 2021 renovations proposed in 2008 have not been done to Westfield Mission Valley.

2010s

In 2012 the Seau's restaurant closed after Junior Seau's death and was replaced by Buffalo Wild Wings in 2013. Meanwhile, at the power center Borders closed and was converted into Giant Book Sale under a short lease until 2012. Trader Joe's and Ulta Beauty opened up in the former Borders Books & Music location in 2013. In 2014 Loehmann's, liquidated their location and was replaced by a Bloomingdale's the outlet store and Tender Greens restaurant a year later in 2015. In late 2016 the indoor food court by Macy's Home and Furniture was shuttered, and a few months after that Sport Chalet had filed for bankruptcy and closed in 2016 as well. In 2017, Golfsmith was converted into a Golf Galaxy store. In March 2017, the Macy's closed as the chain closed 68 stores across the country. In 2018, Michaels moved into the former Sport Chalet space, taking over the part that faced the north parking lot. F21 Red (Forever 21's clearance store) also opened in the sub-divided former Sport Chalet location that year removing mall access to Michaels, but closed only a year after they had opened since they announced a restructuring of the company by closing 41 stores after filing for Chapter 7 bankruptcy.

2020s

In 2019, Westfield started the redevelopment of the former Michaels Arts & Crafts store, where the building was subdivided into main restaurants like Havana Grill, CAVA, Pesto Italian Craft Kitchen, and Mendocino Farms. This portion was completed in late 2020 during the COVID-19 pandemic and has some geometric inspiration after the former May Company building.

In July 2023, Westfield sold both Mission Valley shopping centers to new owners for $290 million. Real Capital Solutions and Lowe bought the original Mission Valley mall, while Sunbelt Investment Holdings Inc. bought Mission Valley West. The new manager for Mission Valley is Dallas-based Centennial. As a result of the sale, Westfield branding was dropped from both centers.

In 2026, it was announced that the former Macy's will be remodeled as Dick's House of Sport, which will open in 2027. The mall was renamed to The Valley in 2026.

Anchor stores

Current tenant	Former tenants/branding
Main anchors, main mall
(empty)	opened as Saks Fifth Avenue in 1983, closed in 1994, later Bed Bath and Beyond
Macy's Home and Furniture	opened as Bullock's on Feb. 19, 1975 Closed December 14, 2024.
Target	Montgomery Ward (opening tenant 1961)
Former May Co. Building currently empty Main article: May Company Building (Mission Valley, San Diego)	May Company (opening tenant 1961), Robinsons-May, Macy's
	Walker Scott (opened 1973)
Secondary anchors, main mall
AMC Theatres	(original tenant, opened 1995)
Bloomingdale's Outlet	Loehmann's (1994–2014)
F21 Red and Michaels	Sport Chalet (1999–2016), J. J. Newberry (1961–1999)
Nordstrom Rack	(opened in 1994)
CAVA, Pesto Italian Craft Kitchen, and Mendocino Farms (all restaurants)	Michaels (until its relocation in 2018)
Mission Valley West power center or strip mall
	The Akron (opened in 1971)
DSW Shoes	-
Golf Galaxy	The Good Guys, Golfsmith
Marshalls	-
Old Navy	-
	Thrifty Drug Stores
Trader Joe's and Ulta Beauty	Borders
West Elm	

== Architecture of the former May Company building ==
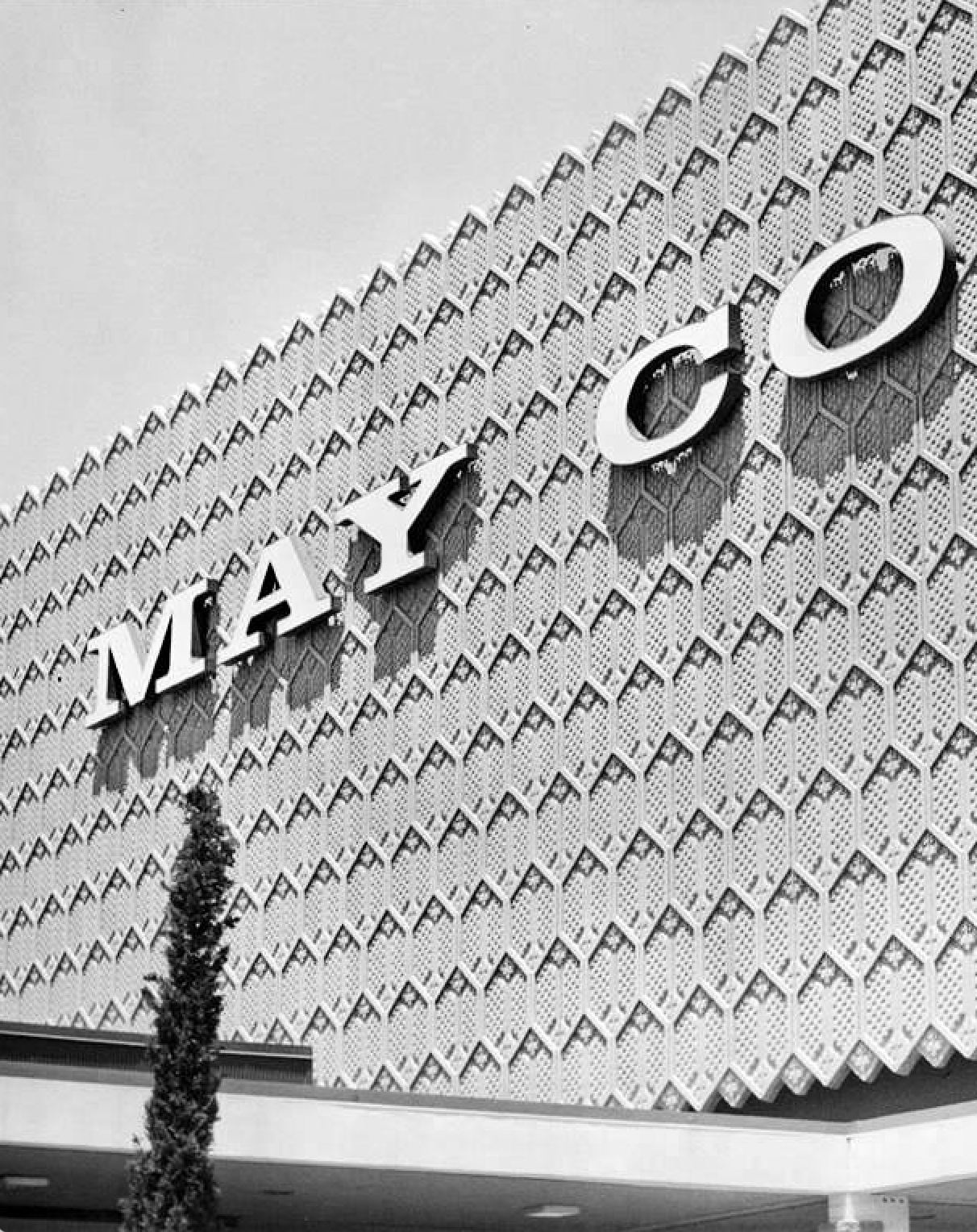
May Co Mission Valley San Diego exterior, 1960s

The original modernist May Company (later Macy's) building was designed in 1959 by William S. (Bill) Lewis, Jr. for LA-based AC Martin (later of Deems-Lewis), Frank L. Hope & Associates backstopped the project locally. It opened in 1961. It has been described by San Diego architectural photographer and historian Darren Bradley as an architectural icon, a "jewel box with a unique texture … striking architecture … the cladding all the way around the building … (is in) a modernist design that plays with light and shadow … designed to grab attention." This was part of a modernist landscape established in the area in the 1960s. As of January 2017, Westfield was considering several different plans for the use of the building.

A 2015 study by the City of San Diego concluded that the building meets several criteria for qualification for the San Diego Resources register: an example of community development and an identifiable architectural style (Modern Contemporary Architecture of 1955–1965). However the report stated that the building did not qualify because of the lack of integrity of the original construction, due to the replacement of some original tiles, altered walls, covering up of the building by new retail space set in front of it, removal of original pop-out display windows and "May Co." signage, and demolition of the 1958 canopy and columns, thus altogether the alteration of more than 50% of the surface area of the original building exterior. It also did not qualify because it is not the "identifiable work" of a "listed Master Architect".

== See also ==
- Fashion Valley Mall
- Westfield Plaza Bonita
- South Bay Plaza
