= Mershops North County =

Shopping mall in Escondido, California

Coordinates: 33°4′6.9″N 117°3′59.2″W

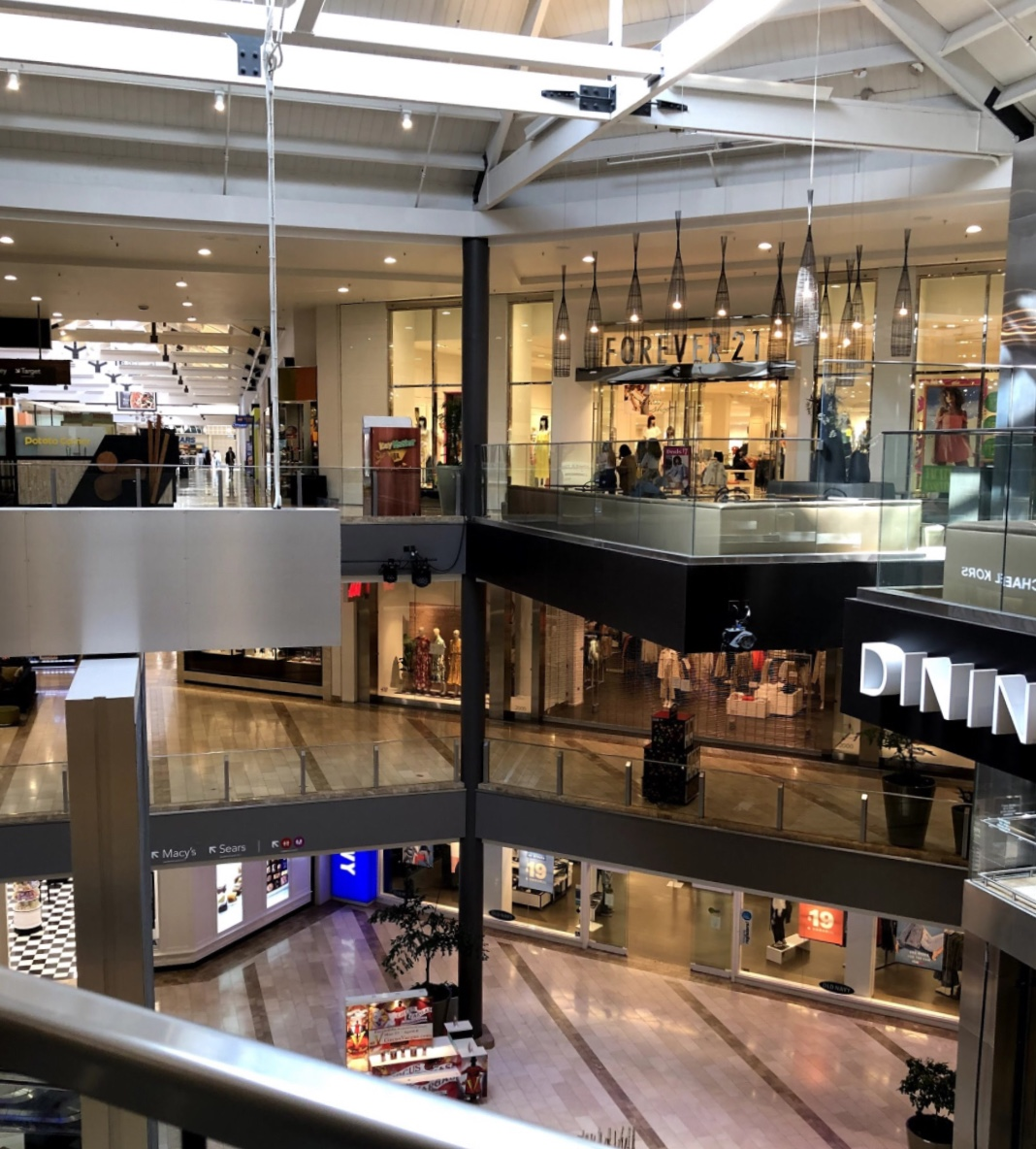
- Main atrium as seen from third floor
- Location: Escondido, California, United States
- Address: 272 East Via Rancho Parkway, Escondido, CA 92025
- Opened: February 1986; 40 years ago
- Previous names: North County Fair (1986 - 1998); Westfield Shoppingtown North County (1998 - 2005); Westfield North County (2005 - 2023); North County Mall (2023 - 2025)
- Developer: The Hahn Company
- Manager: Spinoso Real Estate Group
- Owner: Mershops
- Num. of stores: 160
- Num. of anchor tenants: 6 (3 open, 3 under development)
- Floor area: 1,300,000 square feet (120,000 m^{2})
- Floors: 3 (2 in JCPenney and former Sears)
- Website: https://www.northcountymall.com

Mershops North County is a shopping mall in Escondido, California, owned by Mershops and managed by Spinoso Real Estate Group. It is anchored by JCPenney, Macy's, Target, and an upcoming Round1, Costco, and Chuze Fitness.

== History ==
=== 1980s ===
The mall originally opened in February 1986 as North County Fair with JCPenney, May Company, Nordstrom, J.W. Robinson's, Sears, and The Broadway as its original anchors.

=== 1990s ===
In 1993, both the Robinson's and May Company anchors became Robinsons-May locations. In 1996, The Broadway became Macy's.

=== 2000s ===
Westfield dropped the "Shoppingtown" from the names of all centers they operated in June 2005. In 2006, following Federated Department Stores' merger with May Department Stores, the two Robinsons-May locations closed. The former Robinson's location has been subdivided into Forever 21, H&M and Old Navy, while the former May Company location is now Target.

=== 2010s ===
North County Tavern + Bowl opened on the second level of the mall in December 2010, replacing Oggi's Pizza & Brewing Co. and three adjacent stores. The 15,000 square foot facility encompassed a 300-seat restaurant, a 30-foot bar, and eight bowling lanes. The tavern closed in 2017 and was replaced by a Comic Book and Memorabilia store.

In 2012, Westfield announced a $55 million revitalization plan and included renovating the mall's interior, updating the exterior mall entrances, and resurfacing the parking lot.

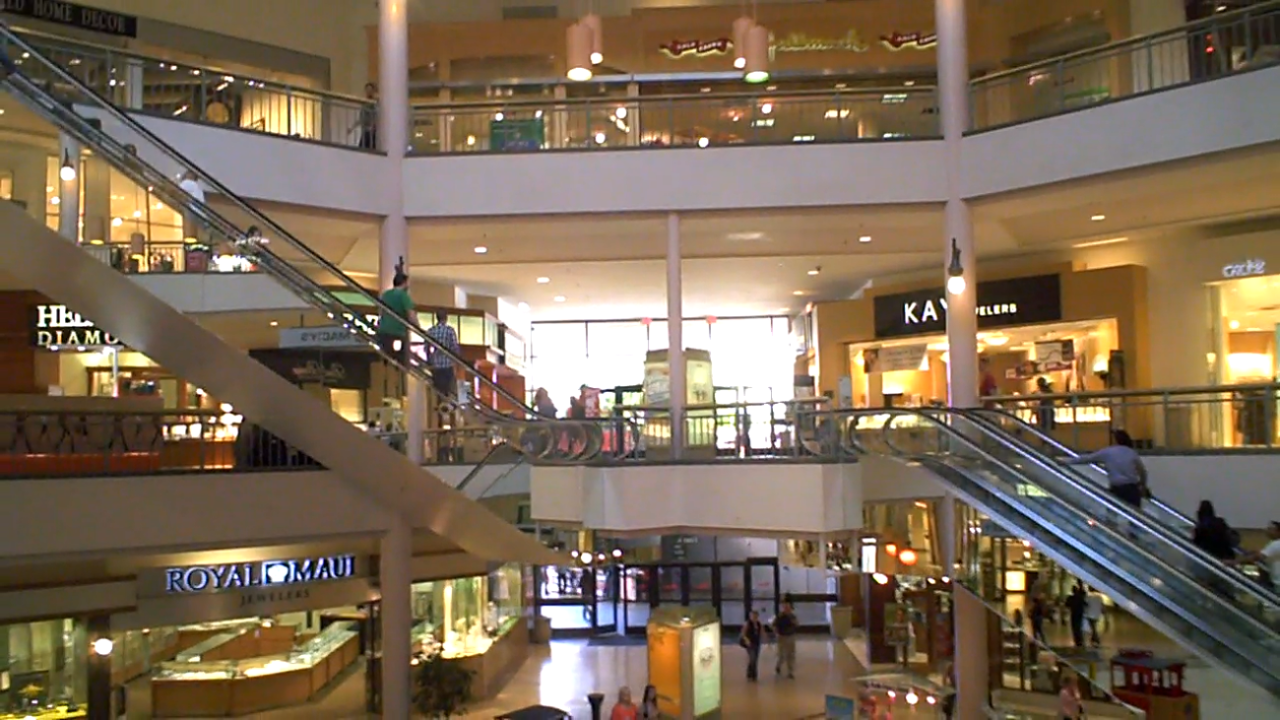
A view of the three-level center court of the mall in 2011.

=== 2020s ===
On May 7, 2020, it was announced that Nordstrom would close, as a result of the economic impact of the COVID-19 pandemic.

On June 22, 2020, it was announced that Sears would close. Costco planned to lease the Sears space, however, plans were cancelled a year later.

On February 7, 2023, it was announced that Westfield had sold the mall to a joint venture of Bridge Group Investments and Steerpoint Capital, with Spinoso Real Estate Group taking over management duties. As part of the sale the mall was renamed to North County Mall.

In late 2024, Round1 Entertainment signed a 20-year lease for the three-level space formerly occupied by Nordstrom, with construction slated to begin in 2025, the location will include a new YUU Japanese Food Hall concept.

On June 11, 2025, the Escondido Public Library opened a temporary location in the mall while the main library closed for remodeling. It remained open until July 2026.

In August 2025, North County Mall rebranded as Mershops North County after it's owner, Bridge Group Investments, rebranded to Mershops.

24 Hour Fitness closed its location at North County in March 2026. That vacancy would be short lived however as Chuze Fitness is planning on opening in the former 24 Hour Fitness according to its website.

In April 2026, Apple announced it would be closing its North County location in June 2026 citing 'declining conditions' at the mall. The store closed on June 20, 2026.

In 2025 and 2026, discussions about Costco potentially reviving plans to open in former Sears at North County were announced. On August 12, 2026, a lease was approved for Costco to open a store on the ground level of the former Sears site, alongside a gas station.

== See also ==
- Plaza Bonita
- Fashion Valley Mall
- Westfield UTC
- The Shoppes at Carlsbad
