= Westfield UTC =

Outdoor shopping mall in San Diego, California, United States

Coordinates: 32.8698°N 117.212°W

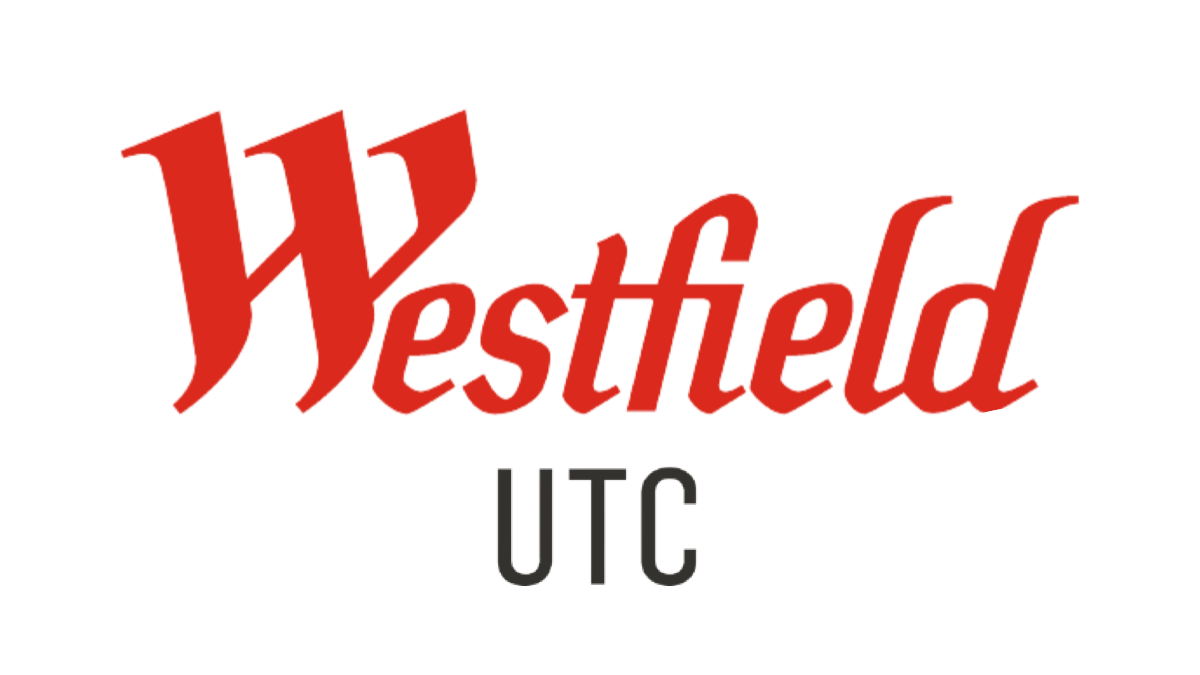

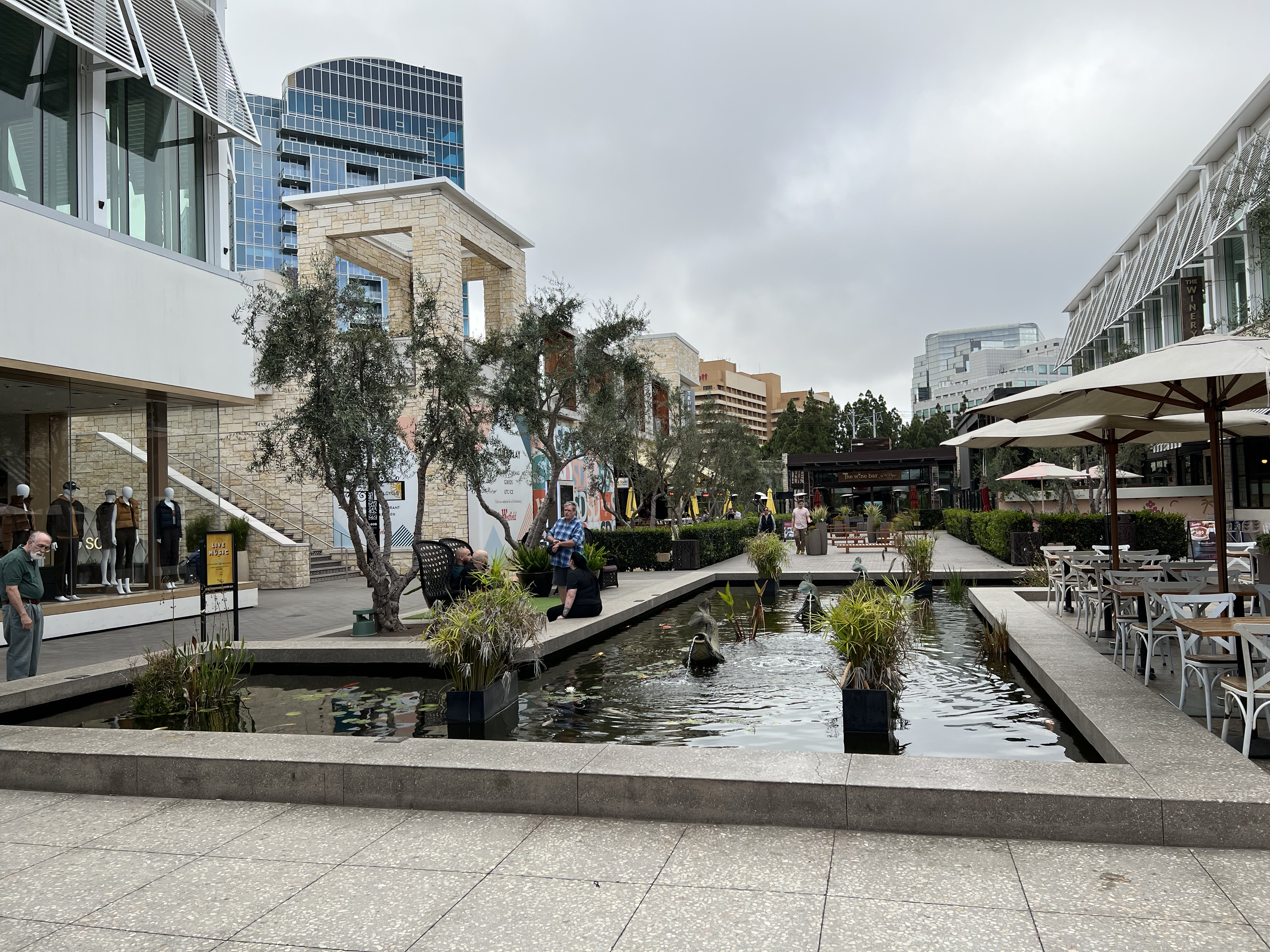
- Location: University City, San Diego, California
- Address: 4545 La Jolla Village Drive, San Diego, CA 92122
- Opened: 1977
- Developer: The Hahn Company
- Manager: Unibail-Rodamco-Westfield
- Owner: Unibail-Rodamco-Westfield
- Num. of stores: 199 (as of 2026)
- Num. of anchor tenants: 9
- Floor area: 1,066,842 ft²
- Floors: 2 (3 in Macy's)
- Public transit: UTC Transit Center
- Website: westfield.com/utc

Westfield UTC is an upscale, open-air shopping mall in the University City community of San Diego, California. It lies just east of La Jolla, near the University of California, San Diego. The mall is served by UTC Transit Center, which is the northern terminus of the Blue Line of the San Diego Trolley. UTC refers to University Towne Center.

== History ==
Ernest W. Hahn first proposed building UTC in 1972. Upon opening in 1977 as University Towne Centre, the anchor stores were Robinson's (later Robinsons-May), the Broadway (now Macy's), and Sears. In 1984, Nordstrom, 31 new stores, and new parking structures opened.

In 1989, UTC was the site of an international incident when a minivan belonging to William C. Rogers III, who had been implicated in the shootdown of Iran Air Flight 655, was bombed there.

In 1998, Westfield bought UTC, except for the parcel owned by Sears. That same year, the Macy's and Robinsons-May locations expanded. J.P. Morgan Investment bought a 50% interest in UTC.

A $12 million remodel in 2007 added grassy areas, trellises with flowering vines, palm trees and fountains, according to UTC in a park-like or "European village" atmosphere, with carts, flowers, fruits and an al fresco food pavilion.

=== 2010s phased expansion ===
In 2008, a one-billion-dollar revitalization plan for UTC was approved by the San Diego City Council. However, due to the Great Recession, the revitalization project was put on hold for several years and later reduced to $500 million, but later again revised up to $600 million.

==== Northwest side ====
In 2011, the first, $180 million phase of the revitalization commenced: the mall's food court was transformed into an indoor/outdoor Dining Terrace while the former Robinsons-May building was subdivided to house three new retailers: a large-scale Forever 21, a relocated 24 Hour Fitness, a 14-screen AMC Theatres (formerly ArcLight Cinema), plus Tiffany, J.Crew, and Lululemon stores.

In 2016, construction began on a 400,000-square-foot expansion on the northwest section, including:

- a new 144,000-square-foot Nordstrom, which opened in October 2017, with the old Nordstrom building left abandoned until it was demolished in 2022, also demolishing neighboring retailers which have been empty for many years.
- a new parking garage on the west-central side. The UTC Transit Center trolley station opened at its south end in November 2021, which is the northern terminus of the San Diego Trolley's Blue Line extension.
- 90 new shops, restaurants and services, of which about a third were open by the end of 2017.

In April 2016 the two-story Sport Chalet which opened in 1999, closed its UTC location due to Chapter 7 bankruptcy. Room & Board later took over the vacant space in 2017.

In 2019, Forever 21 filed for Chapter 11 bankruptcy and announced that they would be closing 3 San Diego locations to restructure the company including its UTC location which later closed late January 2024.

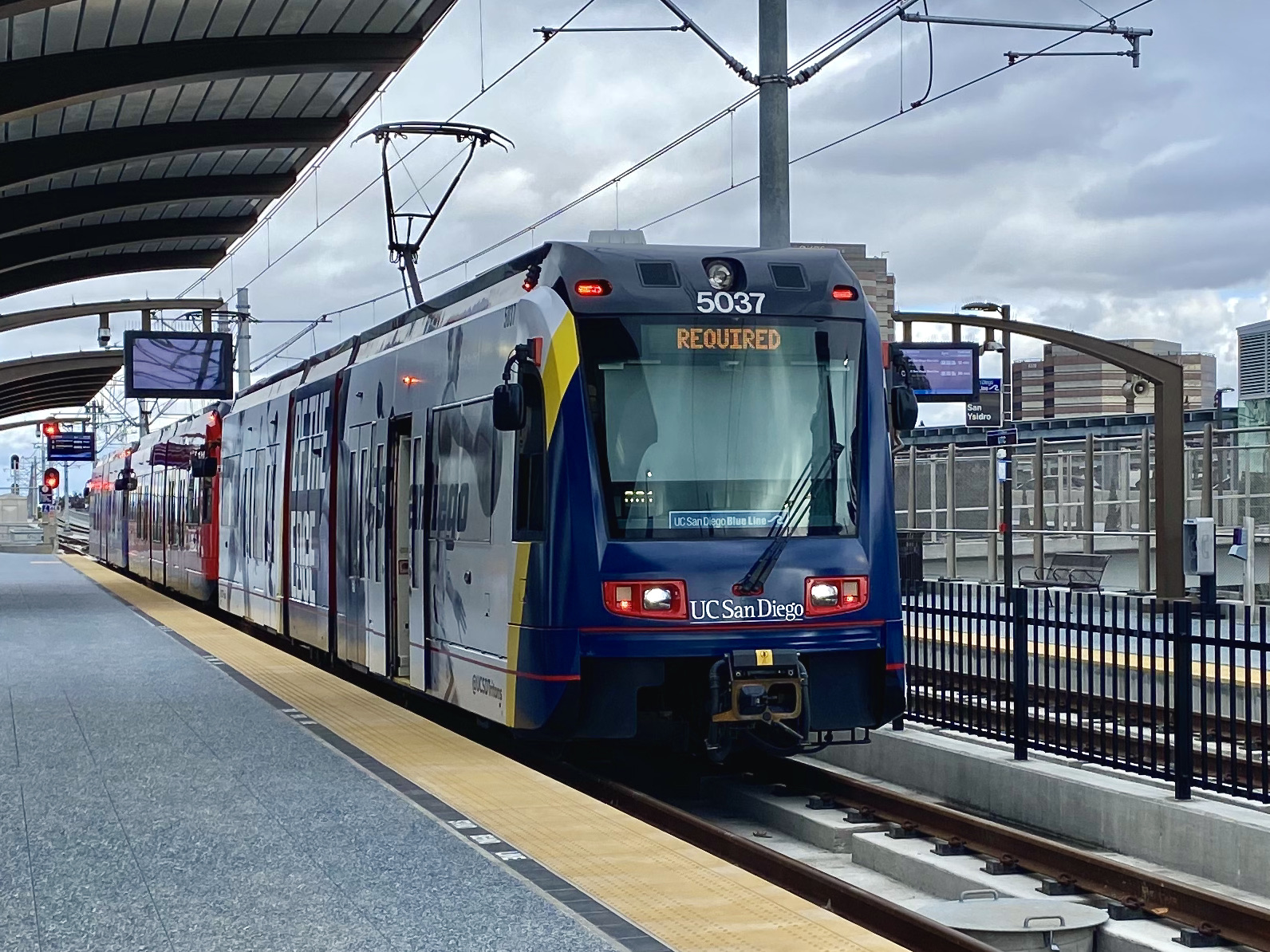
UTC Transit Center

==== Culinary emphasis ====
Many new restaurants were added during this period including a Shake Shack and a Javier's. Michele Parente, restaurant critic at The San Diego Union-Tribune, called UTC her favorite area for restaurants in San Diego County, noting the presence of Din Tai Fung, Sweetfin Poké, Paranà Empanadas, Napizza, The Winery, Smokehouse BBQ, True Food Kitchen, and La Colombe Coffee Roasters, stating: "eating is what they're selling there now".

==== Northeast side/former Sears ====
While construction continued at the northwest of UTC, on the northeast side, Sears closed in July 2017. The Sears parcel is owned by Seritage Growth Properties, a spinoff of Sears. Portions of the space have become Corner Bakery Cafe, Williams Sonoma/Pottery Barn Kids, with Crate & Barrel on an outparcel. The Sears building was demolished, and the site is now a two story building called The Collection. Parts of the project have been opened to the public, while the main building is still under construction.

==== Other ====
Palisades at UTC, a 23-story, 300-unit luxury apartment building located at the southeast corner of the site, opened in 2019.

On February 17, 2024, "El Chato" of the Tijuana Cartel was killed on the driveway to the parking garage of the Palisades on Nobel Drive after he and an unidentified man were shot in a targeted shooting.

== See also ==
- Fashion Valley Mall
- Plaza Bonita
