= May Company Building (Mission Valley, San Diego) =

Commercial building

Coordinates: 32.768964°N 117.146329°W

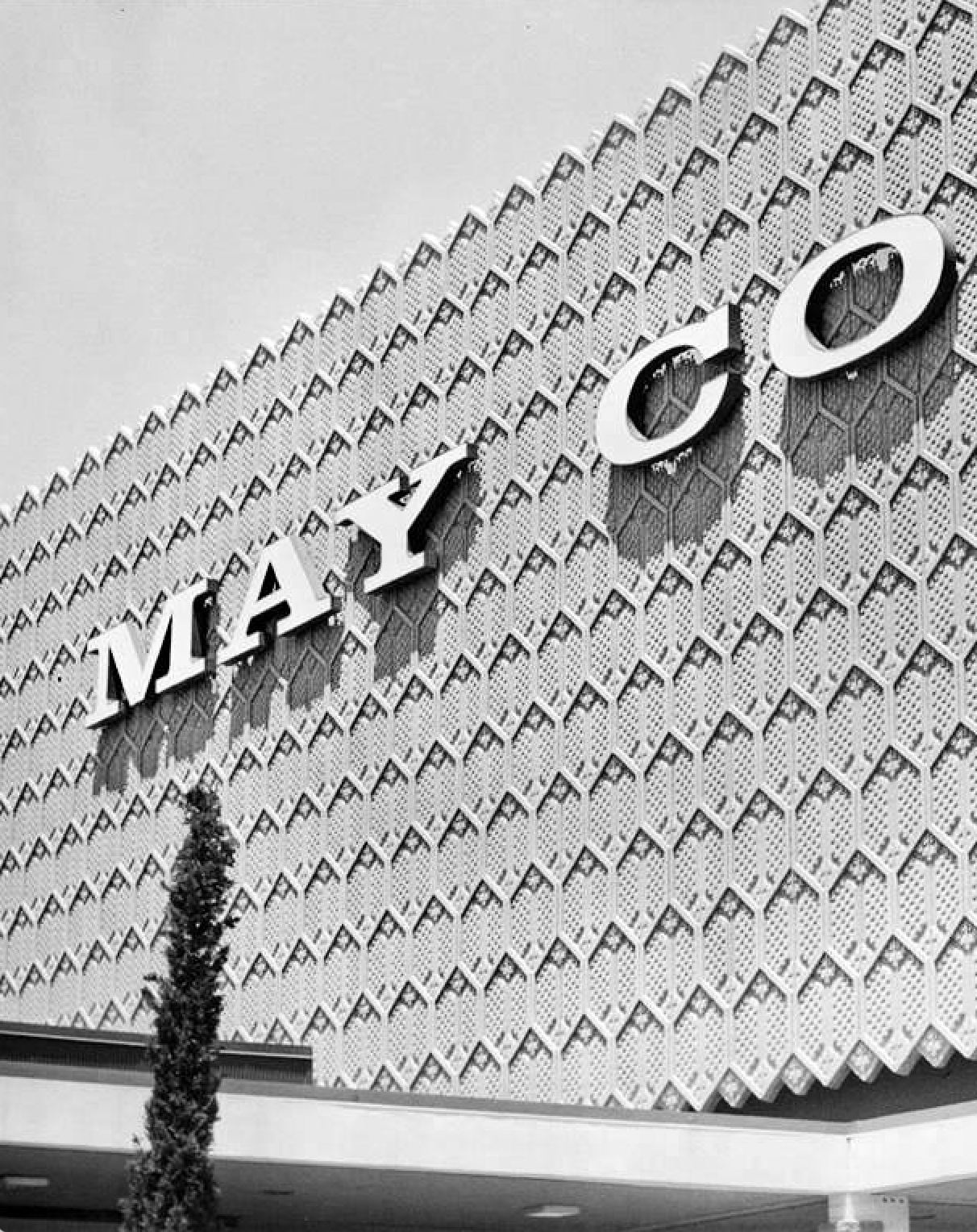
- May Co. Mission Valley San Diego exterior, 1960s
- Interactive map of the May Company Building area
- Former names: May Company Building (1961-1993); Robinsons-May Building (1993-2006); Macy's Building (2006-2017)

General information
- Status: Complete, currently unoccupied
- Type: Retail Anchor
- Architectural style: Modern
- Location: Mission Valley, San Diego, United States
- Construction started: 1959
- Completed: 1960
- Opened: February 20, 1961

Technical details
- Floor count: 4 (1 basement level)
- Floor area: 363,000 sq ft (33,700 m^{2})

Design and construction
- Architect: William S. Lewis (AC Martin and Associates)
- Developer: May Centers, Inc, May Company

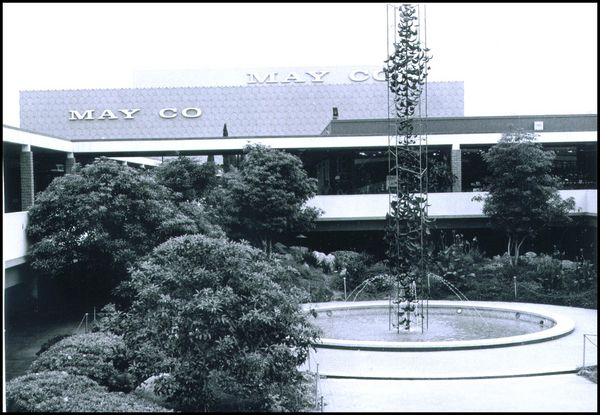
View of the May Co. bldg. from the center courtyard of Mission Valley center in 1965

The May Company Building is one of the anchor tenants of the Westfield Mission Valley shopping center in San Diego, and is an example of modernist architecture. The building opened as a May Company store on February 20, 1961; the first location of May Co. in San Diego. The store later rebranded as Robinsons-May in 1993 after May Company merged with Robinson's. A subsequent rebranding as Macy's occurred in 2006, upon Federated Department Stores merger with the May Department Stores Company. Macy's operated until the store was closed in 2017. It is currently empty.

The May Company Building at Mission Valley was designed in 1958. Construction began in 1959 with completion in late 1960; the store opened with the mall on February 20, 1961. It was designed by William S. (Bill) Lewis, Jr. for LA-based AC Martin (later of Deems-Lewis), Frank L. Hope & Associates backstopped the project locally. The building consists of 363,000 square feet on three levels, with one basement level. A large cafe, originally named The Mission Room extends from the second floor on the southern face of the building. Framed in floor-to-ceiling windows, it provided patrons expansive views of Highway 80 (later Interstate 8), and the hills of south Mission Valley. It has been described by San Diego architectural photographer and historian Darren Bradley as an architectural icon, a "jewel box with a unique texture … striking architecture … the cladding all the way around the building … (is in) a modernist design that plays with light and shadow … designed to grab attention." This was part of a modernist landscape established in the area in the 1960s. As of January 2017, Westfield was considering a number of different plans for the use of the building.

A 2015 study by the City of San Diego concluded that the building meets several criteria for qualification for the San Diego Resources register: an example of community development and of an identifiable architectural style (Modern Contemporary architecture of 1955–1965). However the report stated that the building did not qualify because of the lack of integrity of the original construction, due to replacement of some original tiles, altered walls, covering up of the building by new retail space set in front of it, removal of original pop-out display windows and "May Co." signage, and demolition of the 1958 canopy and columns, thus all together the alteration of more than 50% of the surface area of the original building exterior. It also did not qualify because it is not the "identifiable work" of a "listed Master Architect".
