= Fashion Valley (shopping mall) =

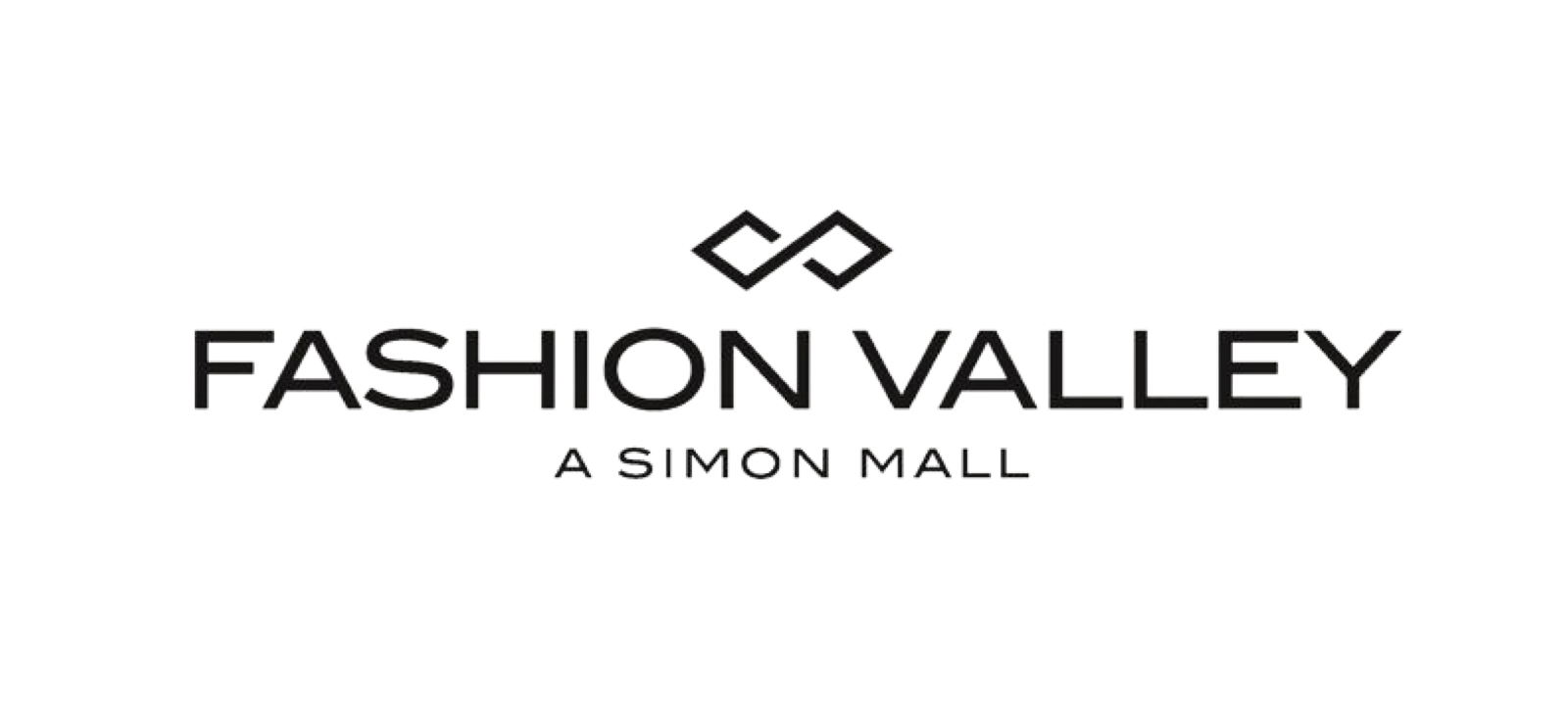

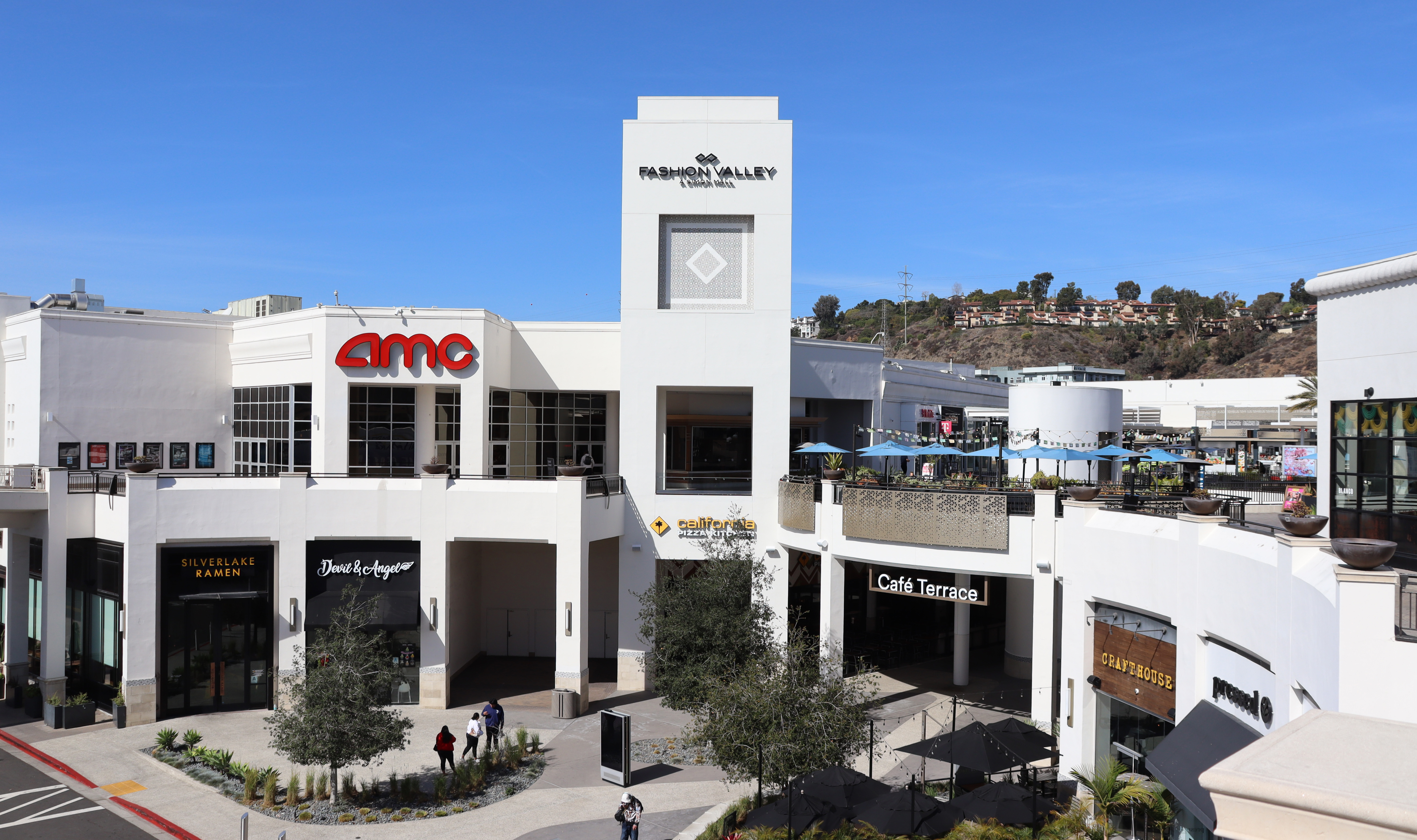
- Fashion Valley Mall
- Location: San Diego, California, United States
- Coordinates: 32.76725°N 117.16817°W
- Address: 7007 Friars Road
- Opened: October 12, 1969
- Developer: The Hahn Company
- Manager: Simon Property Group
- Owner: Simon Property Group (50%); Lendlease (50%)
- Num. of stores: 196
- Num. of anchor tenants: 5
- Floor area: 1,720,533 sq ft (159,842.7 m^{2})
- Floors: 2 (3 in Bloomingdales, Macy’s, Neiman Marcus, and Nordstrom)
- Public transit: Fashion Valley Transit Center
- Website: www.simon.com/mall/fashion-valley

Fashion Valley (also called Fashion Valley Mall) is an upscale, open-air shopping mall in Mission Valley in San Diego, California. The shopping center hosts 1,720,533 sq ft (159,842.7 m^{2}) of leasable floor area, making it the largest mall in San Diego and one of the largest in California. It is managed by the 50% owner Simon Property Group.

== History ==
=== Launch (1969) ===
Fashion Valley, developed by Ernest W. Hahn at a cost of $50 million, opened on October 12, 1969, (after a soft launch on September 8) on a 78-acre (32 ha) site, part of which had held the baseball stadium Westgate Park. Aiming to be the leading shopping center in the San Diego region, it opened with 3 full-line department store anchors:

- J. W. Robinson's — architects William Pereira and Associates
- Buffum's — architects Killingsworth, Brady and Associates
- The Broadway — designed by Charles Luckman and Associates and stated to have been the biggest Broadway opening of the 20 years up to that time. Broadway subsequently closed its downtown San Diego store, the former Marston's flagship.

Within a year, the center would add a two-story J. C. Penney (225,000 square feet (20,900 m^{2}), opened Fall 1970), a Joseph Magnin specialty department store and a Woolworth discount store or five and dime (opened March 1970). At opening, the center had around 1,000,000 square feet (93,000 m^{2}) of gross leasable area, parking for 6,000 cars, and a Spanish architectural theme, with quarry and red Spanish-style tile and a 50-foot (15 m)-high tower by sculptor Jerry Mahoney.

Since its opening, the mall has undergone several expansions and changes.

=== 1980s ===
The first major renovation was in August 1981, adding Nordstrom and Neiman Marcus, establishing Fashion Valley as the fashion leader in the valley. The Joseph Magnin chain went out of business in 1984.

=== 1990s ===
In 1991, Buffum's closed, and their location was reopened in 1992 by upscale specialty San Francisco department store I. Magnin. However, the upscale company eventually closed all stores in the mid-90s, and the Fashion Valley location was replaced by Saks Fifth Avenue in 1995. Robinson's became a Robinsons-May in 1993, while The Broadway was purchased by Macy's in 1996, rebranding it as a Macy's store with fashion departments only (the chain's home and furniture departments are found at Westfield Mission Valley's location, formerly Bullock's).

In October 1997, Gene Kemp led a $110 million renovation project, enlarging the Macy's, Nordstrom, and Robinsons-May stores. It increased the mall size to 1,720,533 square feet (159,842.7 m^{2}) and 200 stores, and added 5 parking structures to accommodate 8,000 cars. In 2001, the owner of the property, Lend Lease Prime Property Fund, sold a 50% shareholding to Simon Property Group who manage the property.

=== 2000s ===
Due to the merger of May Department Stores and Federated Department Stores in 2006, Robinsons-May closed their store in March of that year, and the location was replaced by San Diego's first Bloomingdale's on November 18, 2006.

=== 2010s ===
In 2010, Forever 21 opened to replace Saks Fifth Avenue.

In 2019, the Simon Property Group announced another renovation inspired by "San Diego's relaxed lifestyle" that would add public spaces, landscaping, a broader selection of dining, outdoor "lounges", and water features. This would be the largest renovation done to the center since the 1990s. RDC provided architectural design services. Renovations were estimated to be completed by November 2021, but due to the COVID-19 lockdown, renovations are yet to be completed as of Winter 2023.

On May 20, 2024, it was announced that the JCPenney location would be replaced with luxury apartments and JCPenney is slated to close its Fashion Valley location in Fall 2025. In March 2025, Forever 21 closed permanently.

== Anchors ==
- Bloomingdale's
- JCPenney
- Macy's
- Neiman Marcus
- Nordstrom

== Mexican customer base ==
Fashion Valley is one of many shopping centers in the San Diego area which has customers from both Tijuana (a city of more than 2 million bordering the City of San Diego, 20 miles to the south of Fashion Valley), and visitors from the interior of Mexico (such as Mexico City), as an important part of its customer base. In 1977, 10% of transactions were with Mexican nationals. In 2019 Simon Malls again reiterated the importance of its customers visiting from Mexico.

== Legal issues ==
Fashion Valley Mall was involved in a legal case involving the quasi-public nature of some private property. The printers union wanted to distribute leaflets in the mall encouraging patrons to boycott Robinsons-May, because Robinsons-May was an advertiser in the San Diego newspaper with which the printers union was negotiating. The court held that this activity was protected and allowed on the property, even though the action was contrary to the business interests of the targeted tenant. The decision is based on article 1 section 2 of the California Constitution.

== See also ==
- Westfield UTC
- Mission Valley (shopping mall)
- Westfield Plaza Bonita
- Otay Ranch Town Center
- Las Americas Premium Outlets
