= Otay Ranch Town Center =

Coordinates: 32.6237°N 116.9677°W

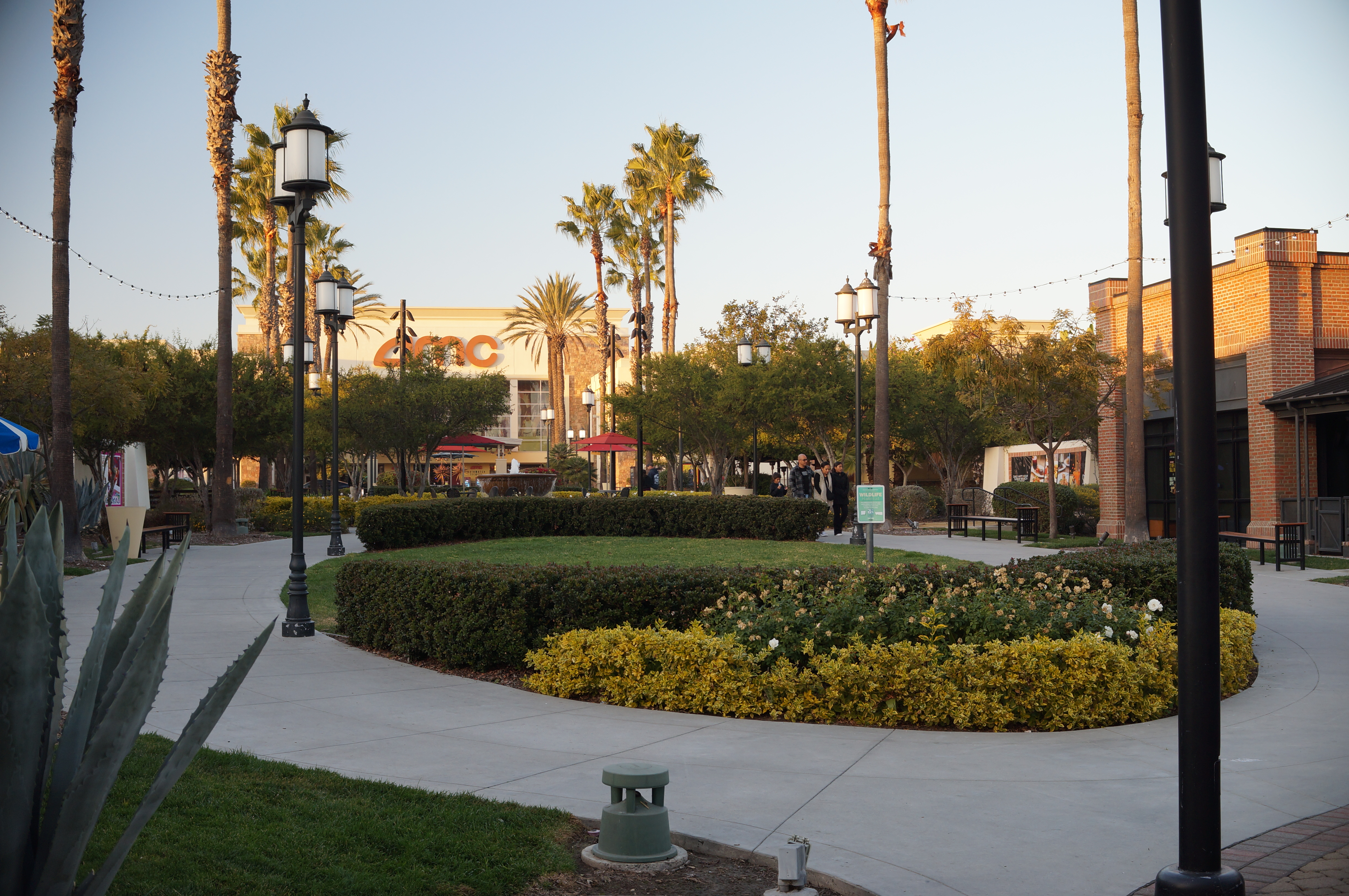
- Location: Chula Vista, California
- Opened: October 27, 2006; 20 years ago
- Developer: General Growth Properties
- Manager: GGP
- Owner: GGP
- Num. of stores: 103
- Num. of anchor tenants: 1 (vacant)
- Floor area: 654,646 square feet (60,818.6 m^{2})
- Public transit: South Bay Rapid 225
- Website: www.otayranchtowncenter.com/en.html

Otay Ranch Town Center is an open-air shopping mall/lifestyle center in the Otay Ranch area of Chula Vista, California, south of San Diego. Owned and operated by GGP, a subsidiary of Brookfield Properties, it has one vacant anchor store once occupied by Macy's, and features AMC Theatres, Barnes & Noble, and Planet Fitness.

Other retailers include Apple Inc., H&M, and Hollister Co. Dining options include The Cheesecake Factory, Chili's, and P.F. Chang's China Bistro.

== History ==
=== 2000s ===
Otay Ranch Town Center opened on October 27, 2006, with anchors, Borders, Macy's, REI, and AMC theaters. There is also a power center east of the mall with big box retailers like Best Buy and Ulta Beauty and a few restaurants.

The Mall had originally been planned to be a high-end mall attracting additional anchors like Nordstrom. Due to the 2008 financial crisis, those plans were changed, and the site is now a soccer field.

In 2007, Borders moved to (nearby competing mall) Westfield Plaza Bonita and was replaced with Barnes & Noble.

=== 2010s ===
Since 2010, many national chain stores including Gap, Anthropologie, Justice, Banana Republic closed. As more stores and eateries closed, Chula Vista Library opened a branch in the food pavilion in 2012 replacing the vacant Geppettos and three eateries to attract more foot traffic at the center. Around 2012, Party City and Designer Shoe Warehouse opened stores at the east end of the mall.

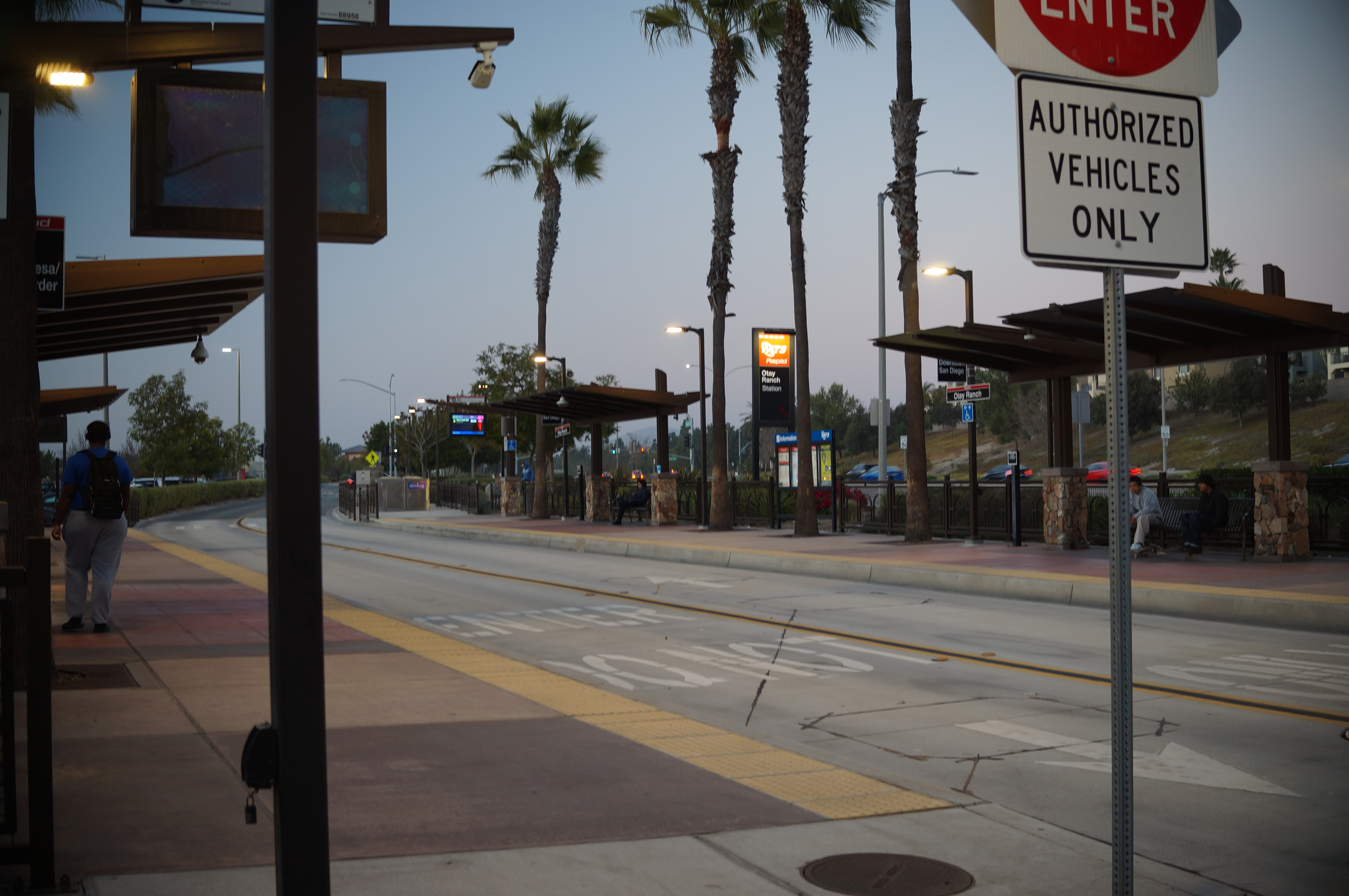
Otay Ranch Mall Rapid 225 Station

In 2017, Recreational Equipment, Inc. did not renew its lease and shuttered their location, and in 2018, Planet Fitness took its place. In 2018 and 2019 new eateries opened in the south parking lot including Panera and Jack in the Box.

In 2019, MTS had a Rapid Bus Route 225 stop built for Otay Ranch Town Center. This new bus route also brought with it a new bridge over SR 125, which meant that residents of the Santa Venetia area could have direct access to the town center.

=== 2020s ===
In 2020, a Barons Market opened in the former DSW location after they had relocated to the former Gap location/ Toys “R” Us express. Also in 2020 the lease of the Library Branch had been extended to 2023. As of 2021 Brookfield Properties announced a reimagination of the town center, making it into a mixed-use development adding many more apartment complexes to what is the current surrounding parking-lot areas (which originally had been planned to be retail spaces in a future extension) as well as “pedestrian-friendly green spaces”. They mentioned that there are no plans to alter retail at the existing Town Center, but the project will help bring in much more foot traffic into the mall much like the few years when the town center had first opened.

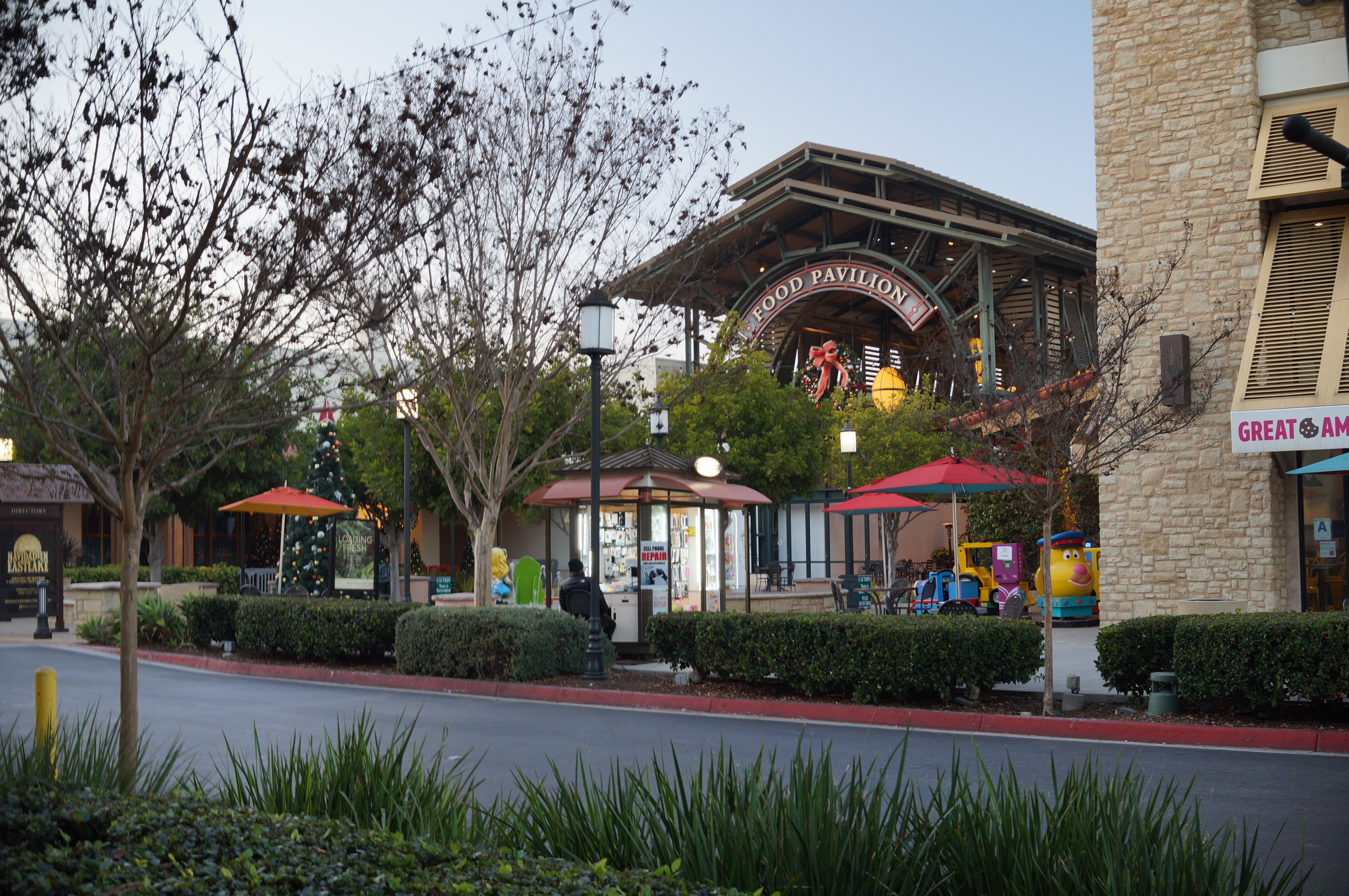
Otay Mall Food Pavilion

On January 9, 2025, it was announced that Macy's would be closing as part of a plan to close 66 stores nationwide. The store closed on March 23, 2025.

== Mall features ==
- The mall hosts a farmer's market every Tuesday afternoon
- Dog park
- Pet-friendly shopping center
- Family-friendly shopping center, with water fountains for children and artificial grass area
- Has an annual tree lighting with Christmas entertainment

== See also ==
- Westfield Plaza Bonita
- Chula Vista Center
- Las Americas Premium Outlets
- Fashion Valley Mall
