= South Bay Plaza =

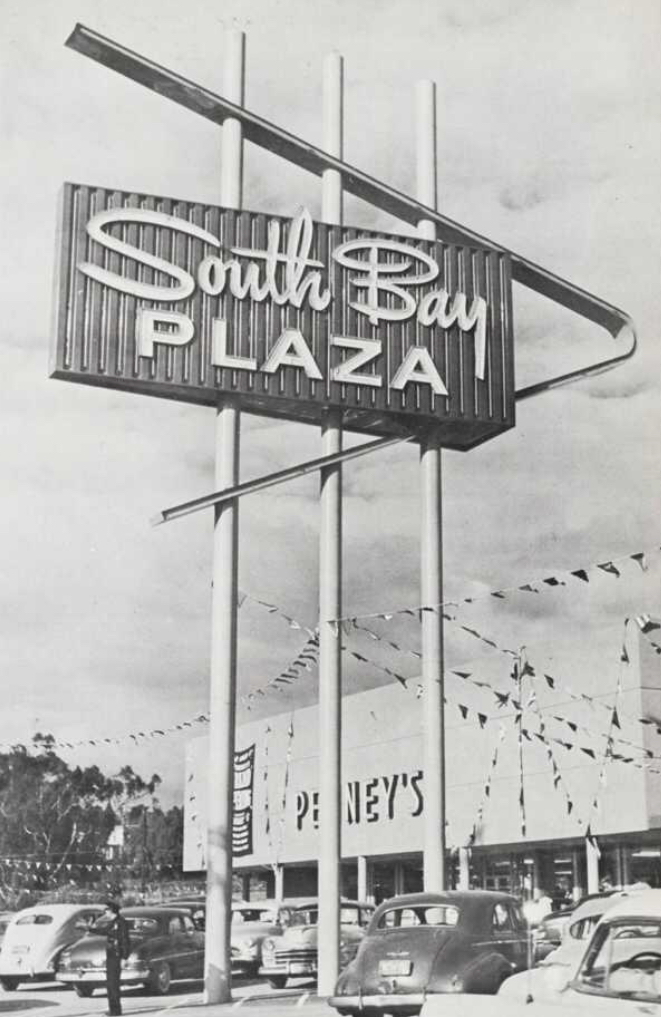
- Location: National City, California
- Coordinates: 32.6758°N 117.0966°W
- Address: 1021 Highland Ave, National City, CA 91950
- Opened: 1954
- Manager: Cal-American
- Num. of stores: 35
- Num. of anchor tenants: 4
- Floor area: 141,868 square feet (13,180.0 m^{2})
- Floors: 1
- Parking: 1000
- Website: https://www.calamerican.com/copy-of-residential

South Bay Plaza is a shopping center at the corner Highland and Plaza Blvds. in National City, California, opened in 1954, the first mall in South Bay, San Diego. Anchored by Price Breakers Indoor Baazar, Chuck E. Cheese, Rent-A-Center and is the second in San Diego metropolitan area after the smaller Linda Vista Shopping Center (opened 1943, demolished 1972).

The first store to open was Mayfair Market, followed by J. C. Penney, W. T. Grant, Woolworth's and 40 other stores. In the 1970s, South Bay Plaza was ravaged by a fire and multiple stores were destroyed. In the 1980s, Plaza Bonita was built, which attracted many businesses, causing business to slow down.

At its opening, the center attracted national attention, as it was considered a new and innovative format at the time. Today the center continues to operate; the former J.C. Penney anchor space is now used as the Price Breakers Indoor Bazaar, a collection of small vendors or an indoor swapmeet.

The center also had been divided into two; everything after the Royal Mandarin restaurant is considered South Bay Plaza East, which remains today. It includes more restaurants like 85°C Bakery Cafe and other shopping retailers.
