= Sweetfin Poke =

American restaurant chain

Sweetfin
- Industry: Restaurant
- Founded: 2013
- Founder: Alan Nathan, Brett Nestadt, Seth Cohen
- Headquarters: Los Angeles
- Website: sweetfin.com

Sweetfin (formerly Sweetfin Poké) is a Los Angeles–based fast casual restaurant chain that serves poke bowls. Sweetfin was founded in 2013 by Alan Nathan, Brett Nestadt, Seth Cohen and Executive Chef Dakota Weiss, with their first store opening in Santa Monica in April 2015. As of 2024, Sweetfin has 16 locations in California: thirteen in Los Angeles, two near Irvine, and one in San Diego.

Sweetfin is regarded as having helped start the trend of poke specific restaurants outside of Hawaii.
