= Seau =

Seau is a surname. Notable people with the surname include:

- Ian Seau (born 1992), American football player
- Junior Seau (1969–2012), American football player
