= John's Incredible Pizza Company =

Buffet and entertainment business

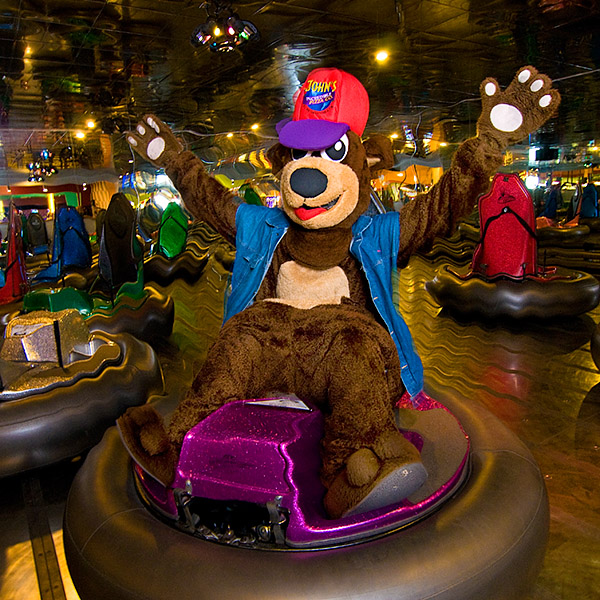
- Type: Private
- Industry: Family entertainment center: Buffet; Family entertainment center
- Founded: June 19, 1997; 29 years ago, in Victorville, California
- Founder: John Parlet
- Headquarters: Rancho Santa Margarita, California
- Number of locations: 9 locations in California and Nevada
- Key people: John Parlet (Owner and CEO)
- Products: Pizza; Pasta; Salads; Desserts
- Services: Arcade games Amusement rides Birthday parties
- Revenue: US$395.5 million (2024)
- Number of employees: 2,000 (2024)
- Website: www.johnspizza.com

John's Incredible Pizza Company is an American all-you-can-eat buffet restaurant, arcade, and family entertainment center business founded by John Parlet in 1997. The company has 9 locations on the West Coast of the United States as of October 2025 (8 in California, 1 in Nevada). Its corporate office is located in Rancho Santa Margarita, California.

== History ==
John's Incredible Pizza Company was founded in 1997 by John Parlet in Victorville, California. The original Victorville location was permanently closed in March 2020 due to the COVID-19 pandemic.

== Themed dining rooms ==
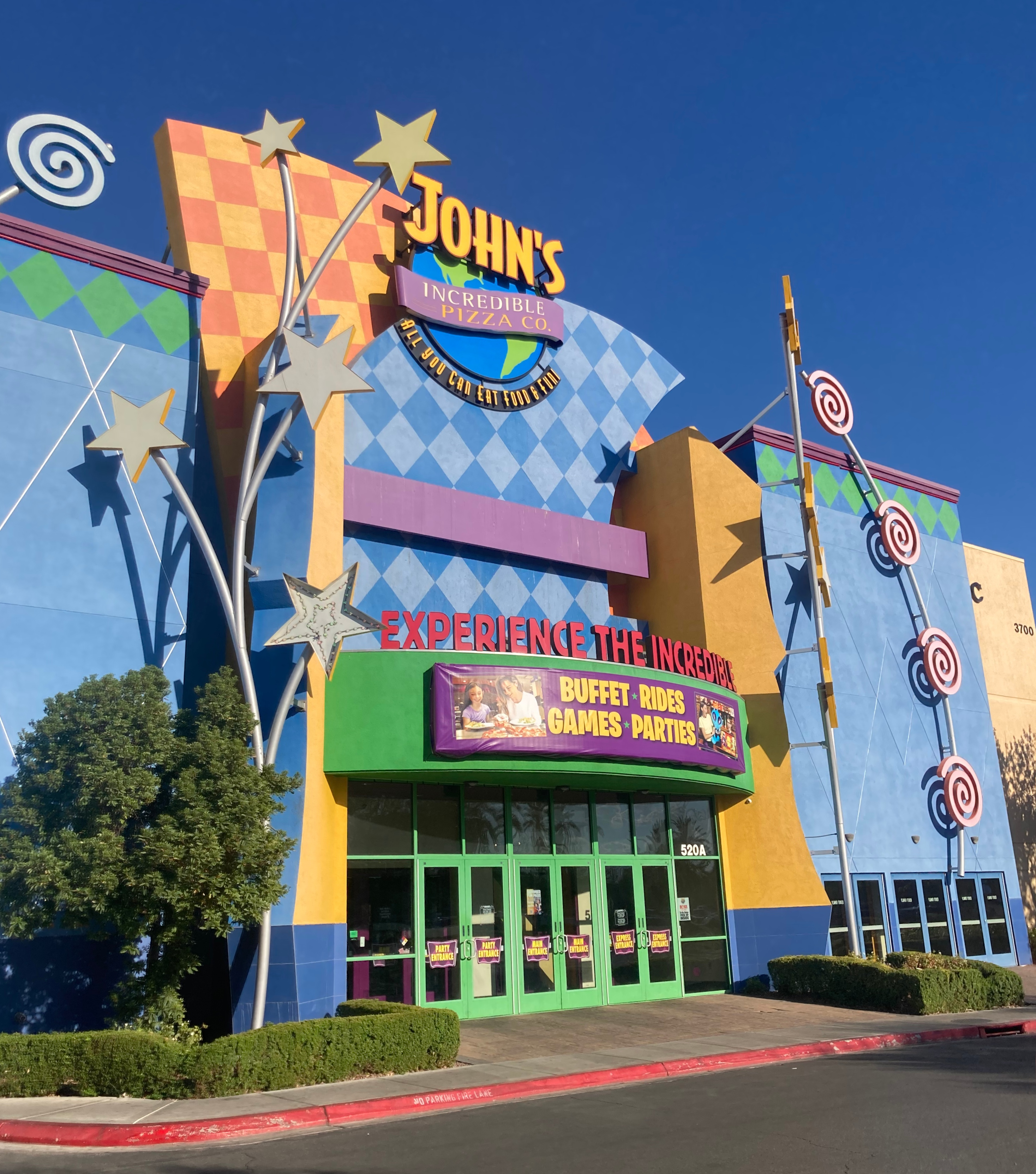
John's incredible Pizza in Las Vegas

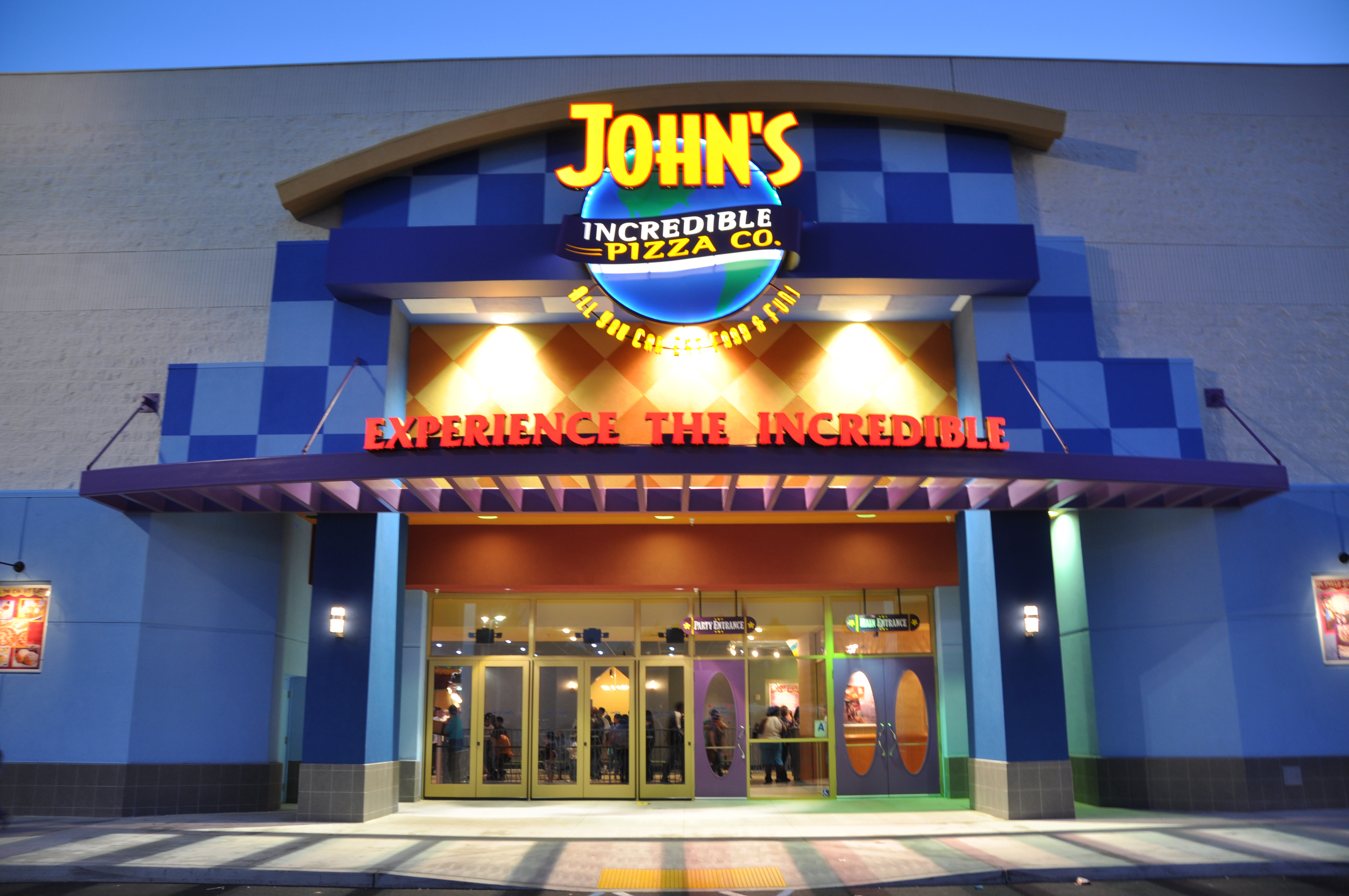
John's Incredible Pizza in National City, California, closed in 2020

Each John's location is approximately 60,000 square feet and has five or six themed dining rooms depending on location. Cabin Fever is similar to a Lake Tahoe-style environment with pine chairs, log-covered walls and a fireplace. The Toon Time Theatre plays cartoons on the television (either programming by Cartoon Network's Boomerang or Disney Junior depending on location) and projection screens throughout the room. The Hall of Fame is like a sports bar with team memorabilia and games on the big-screen televisions. The Vertical Room is an extreme sports room where the customer can watch motocross racing, extreme golf, surfing, snowboarding, or Disney XD. The Fusion Room, or the retreat room, is a room that plays music videos. The Veranda Room is an adult-centered tropical-themed dining room that presents a resort-like atmosphere with windows and wood furnishings. The Kaleidoscope is a room with various lights and hues.

== See also ==
- List of buffet restaurants
- List of pizza chains of the United States
