= Plaza Bonita =

Coordinates: 32°39′22″N 117°3′57″W

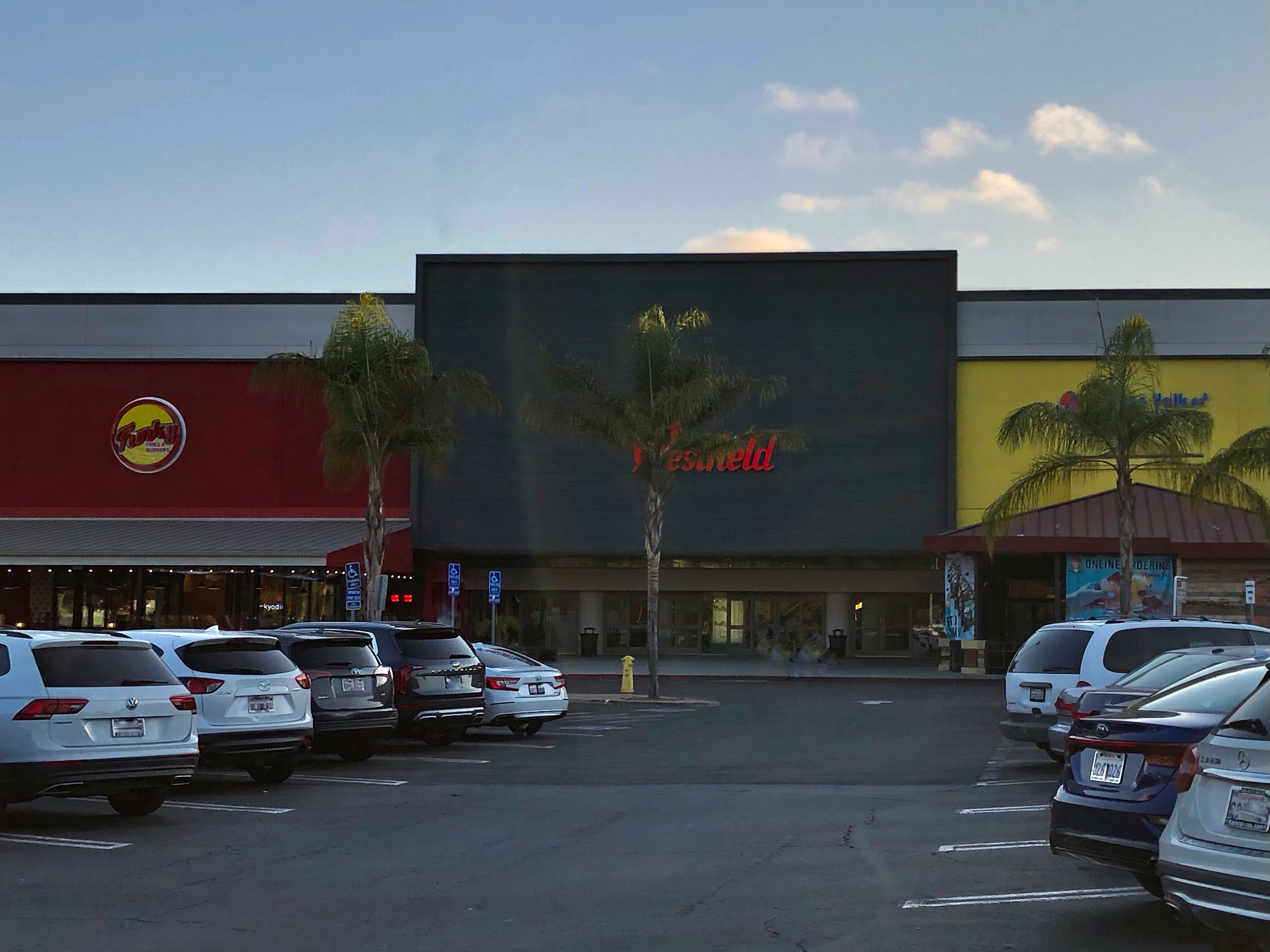
- East entrance of mall.
- Location: National City, California
- Address: 3030 Plaza Bonita Road, 91950
- Opened: February 8, 1981; 45 years ago as Plaza Bonita
- Previous names: Westfield Shoppingtown Plaza Bonita (1994–2005); Westfield Plaza Bonita (2005-2026)
- Developer: May Centers, Inc.
- Manager: Centennial Real Estate
- Owner: Henderson Park; Lowe Enterprises
- Num. of stores: 193
- Num. of anchor tenants: 5
- Floor area: 816,000 square feet (75,800 m^{2})
- Floors: 2
- Parking: 4,586 Parking Spaces (Outdoor Parking Lot/3-Story Parking Lot)
- Public transit: Plaza Bonita Transit Center
- Website: shopplazabonita.com

Plaza Bonita (formerly known as Westfield Plaza Bonita), is an indoor shopping mall in National City, California. It is owned by Henderson Park and Lowe Enterprises. Anchor tenants at the center include Macy's, JCPenney, Target, AMC Theatres, Nordstrom Rack and Round1.

Although it is within the boundaries of National City, the mall is closely associated with and takes its name from the nearby community of Bonita.

== History ==
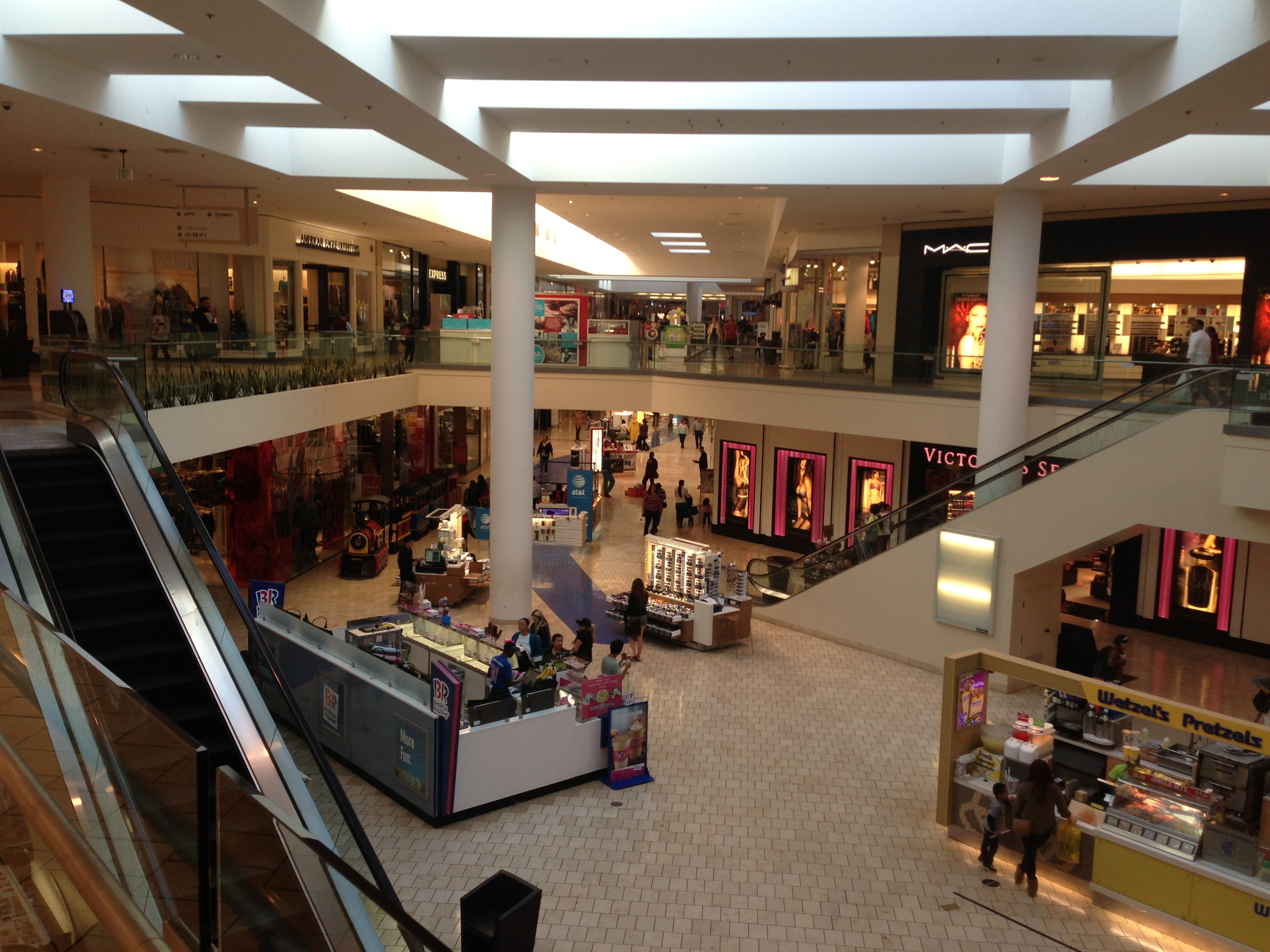
JCPenney Center Court in 2013, with tile work and Stucco from the mid-2002 renovation.

1980s

In the late 1970s May Centers bought the property from the city of National City and had developed the mall over what was the site of a 18-hole golf course. The center opened in the fall of 1981 and is the South Bay’s first and only indoor mall. When the shopping center opened, it housed JCPenney, Mervyn's, Montgomery Ward, and the May Company. The mall motif was inspired by fall tones. It had a brick interior and exterior, with many brown beige tones and fountains throughout the inside and main entrances. The original logo of the mall was a 3-toned rainbow which was red, orange, and yellow, and a font in Dynamo displaying ‘plaza bonita’. And in the spring of 1983 Mann Theaters opened their location near the east entrance of the mall near where the Broken Yolk Cafe is now.

1990s

Westfield America, Inc., a precursor to Westfield Group, acquired the shopping center in 1994 from May Centers and in 1998 the mall was renamed to "Westfield Shoppingtown Plaza Bonita", though the "Shoppingtown" name was dropped in June 2005 at all Westfield shopping centers nationwide. Also during the late 1990s, the sign that is currently seen from the 805 was put up and caused controversy to commuters, so it was modified to its current state. Mann Theaters Plaza Bonita 6 also closed around the late 90s early 2000s.

2000s

In mid-2002, the mall went through several phases of renovations, in which the brick exterior and interior was plastered with stucco then painted and had new ceramic tile installed. Its food court had been renovated, and an Outback Steakhouse restaurant opened in the North-west parking lot, it was the second full restaurant to open after Applebee's (which opened in 1993).

In mid-2006, the former Wards store, which had been the location of seasonal retailers (Halloween costumers and art shows) was stripped and gutted and a new plan was announced to the public that the south end of the mall would be demolished and rebuilt. The former location of the food court was also demolished in 2006 and converted into a Forever 21 (in 2007). Also in 2006, Robinsons-May had been acquired by Federated Department Stores and all locations were rebranded to Macy's.

In 2008 the newly renovated part of the mall had opened with additional anchors including Target, Borders (which had moved from Otay Ranch Town Center), and AMC Theatres as well as close to 40+ new shops like H&M, a new food court known as the Dining Terrace, as well as a three floor parking structure.

On March 3, 2009, the Jollibee Foods Corporation opened its first “Filipino food court” in the United States adjacent from Target, with bakery and restaurants Red Ribbon Bakeshop, Jollibee and Chowking and also had a party room which allowed to seat 40 people. The first of the kind in the United States, which was followed by one at Westfield Southcenter in Washington. However, JFC shuttered the dining hall by 2011 (a Hooters later took its place but then closed in 2020.) Further, Borders closed all locations in 2011 shortly after the company filed for bankruptcy.

2010s

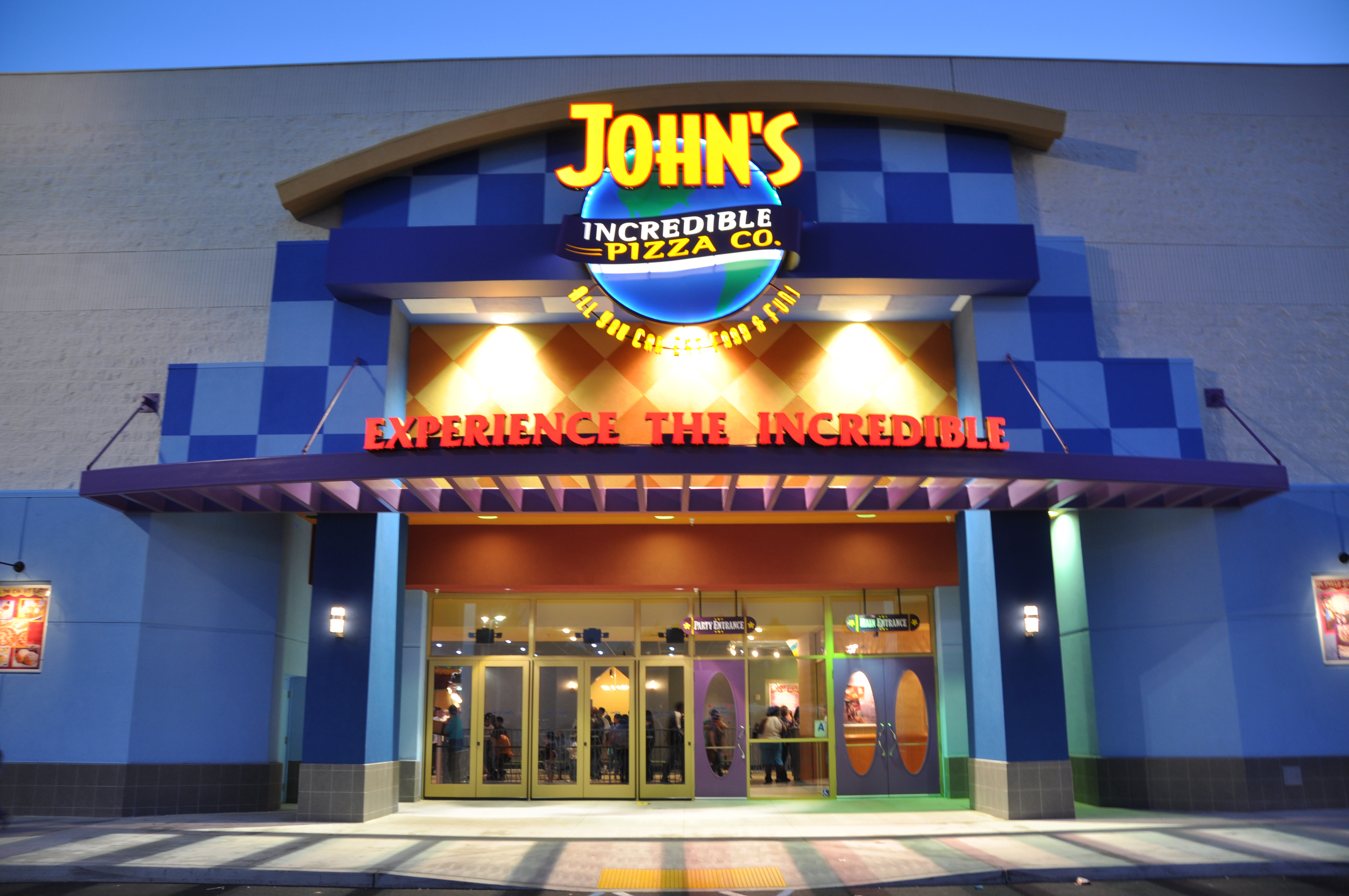
Exterior of former John's Incredible Pizza Company building at Westfield Plaza Bonita.

The John's Incredible Pizza Company opened its second mall location in 2010 on the first floor of the former Mervyn's store following the location at Buena Park Mall. In May 2011, Nordstrom had announced in a press release that they would be opening its third Nordstrom Rack location in San Diego County at Plaza Bonita taking over the second floor of the former Mervyn's location. Later, in August 2012 Crunch Fitness opened replacing Borders old location.

2020s

In May 2020, Unibail-Rodamco-Westfield announced the temporary closures of its centers nationwide during the COVID-19 pandemic. Many non-essential stores had been affected by the pandemic such as John's Incredible Pizza Company which did not reopen in the re-opening of Plaza Bonita in May 2021 and later was gutted by June 2021. In April 2022 Unibail-Rodamco-Westfield, Plaza Bonita's owner and management had announced that the company would be selling all of its 24 U.S. properties by the end of 2024. In the summer of 2022, Japan's Round 1 Bowling & Amusement planned to open its first San Diego location at Westfield North County this later changed to Plaza Bonita in September when the Round One Corporation website released the Plaza Bonita location would be 'coming soon', taking over the space formerly occupied by John's Incredible Pizza. Round 1 opened in June 2024. A month later a fire broke out outside Round 1 as when construction crews hit a gas line, causing a gas leak. In March 2025, Forever 21 closed following the company’s second bankruptcy filing, which led to the shuttering of all remaining store locations nationwide. In May 2025, Crunch Fitness abruptly ceased operations at the mall after failing to reach a lease renewal agreement with Westfield.

On July 21, 2026, Unibail-Rodamco-Westfield sold the mall to a joint venture led by private equity firm Henderson Park and national real estate investor Lowe Enterprises. The acquisition was officially announced 13 days later, on August 3.

== See also ==
- Otay Ranch Town Center
- Chula Vista Center
- South Bay Plaza
