= La Jolla =

Neighborhood in San Diego, California, United States

- Community of San Diego
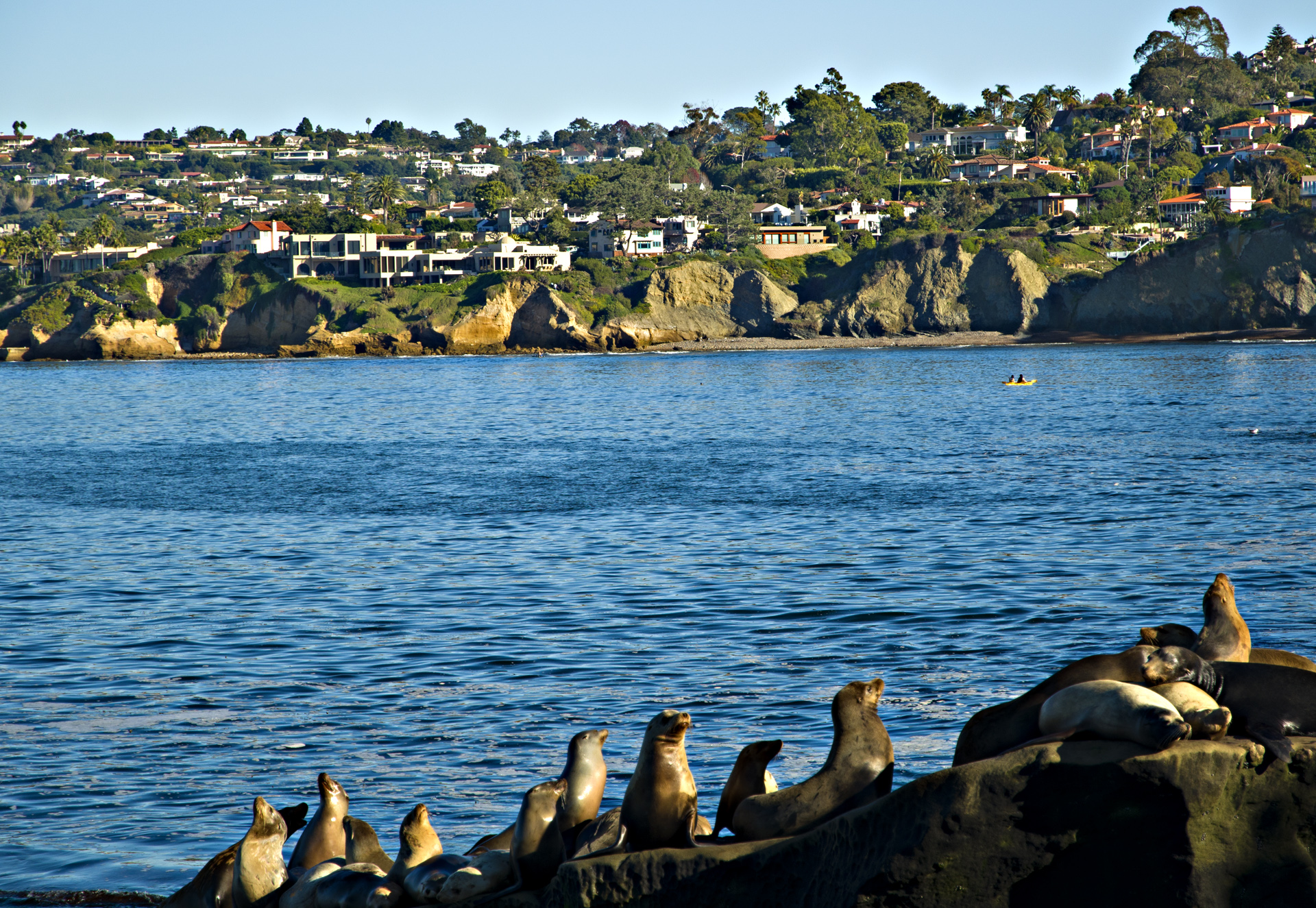
- Nickname: "The Jewel"
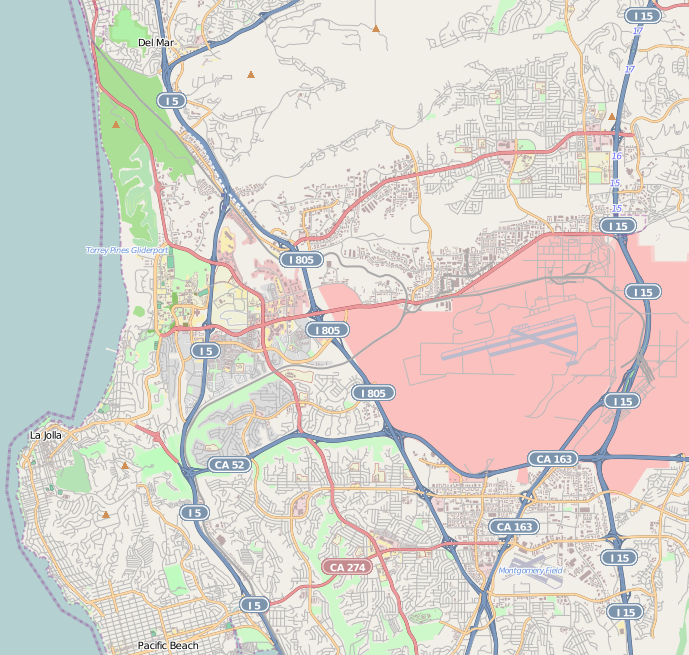
- Location within western San Diego
- Coordinates: 32°50′24″N 117°16′37″W
- Country: United States
- State: California
- County: San Diego
- City: San Diego
- Founded: 1850

Population (2010)
  - Total: 46,781
- Time zone: UTC−08:00 (UTC--08:00)
  - Summer (DST): UTC−07:00 (UTC--07:00)
- ZIP Code: 92037-92039, 92092, 92093
- Area codes: 858, 619

La Jolla (/lə ˈhɔɪə/ la HOY-uh, Latin American Spanish: [la ˈxoʝa]) is a neighborhood in San Diego, California, occupying 7 miles (11 km) of coastline along the Pacific Ocean.

La Jolla is located 12 miles (19 km) north of downtown San Diego and 45 miles (72 km) south of the Orange County line. The neighborhood's border borders Pacific Beach to the south and extends along the shoreline north to include Torrey Pines State Natural Reserve ending at Del Mar.

La Jolla is home to the University of California, San Diego, Birch Aquarium, Scripps Institution of Oceanography, Scripps Research, and the Salk Institute for Biological Studies.

== History ==
=== Etymology ===
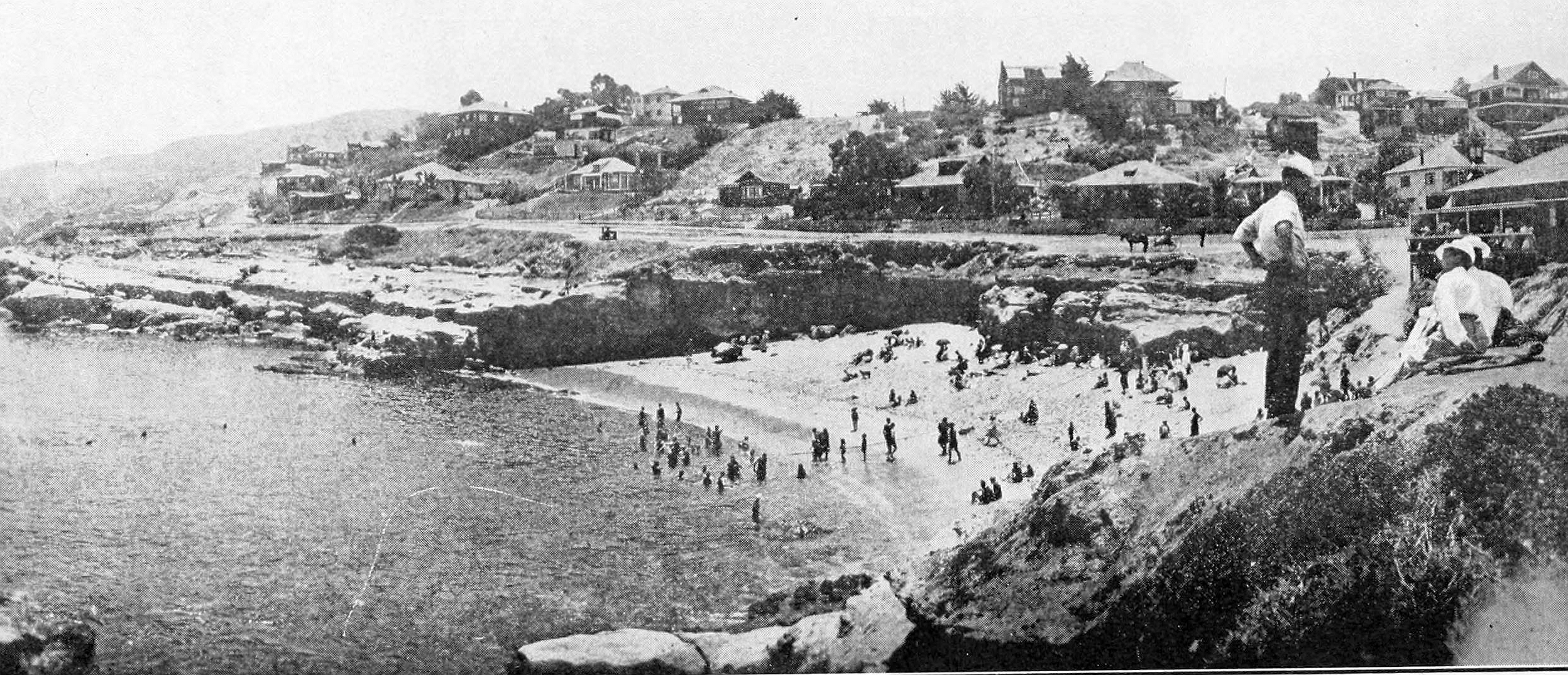
La Jolla, 1908.

Local Native Americans, the Kumeyaay, called this location mat kulaaxuuy (IPA: [mat kəlaːxuːj]), lit. 'land of holes' (mat = 'land'). The topographic feature that gave rise to the name "holes" is uncertain; it probably refers to sea-level caves located on the north-facing bluffs, which are visible from La Jolla Shores. It is suggested that the Kumeyaay name for the area was transcribed by the Spanish settlers as La Jolla. Another suggestion for the origin of the name is that it is an alternative spelling of the Spanish phrase la joya, which means 'the jewel'. Despite being disputed by scholars, this derivation of the name has been widely cited in popular culture. This supposed origin gave rise to the nickname "The Jewel". The name may also come from the Spanish La Hoya, meaning a geographic hollow. Different spelling conventions over the years would permit this to be written as La Jolla.

=== Early history ===
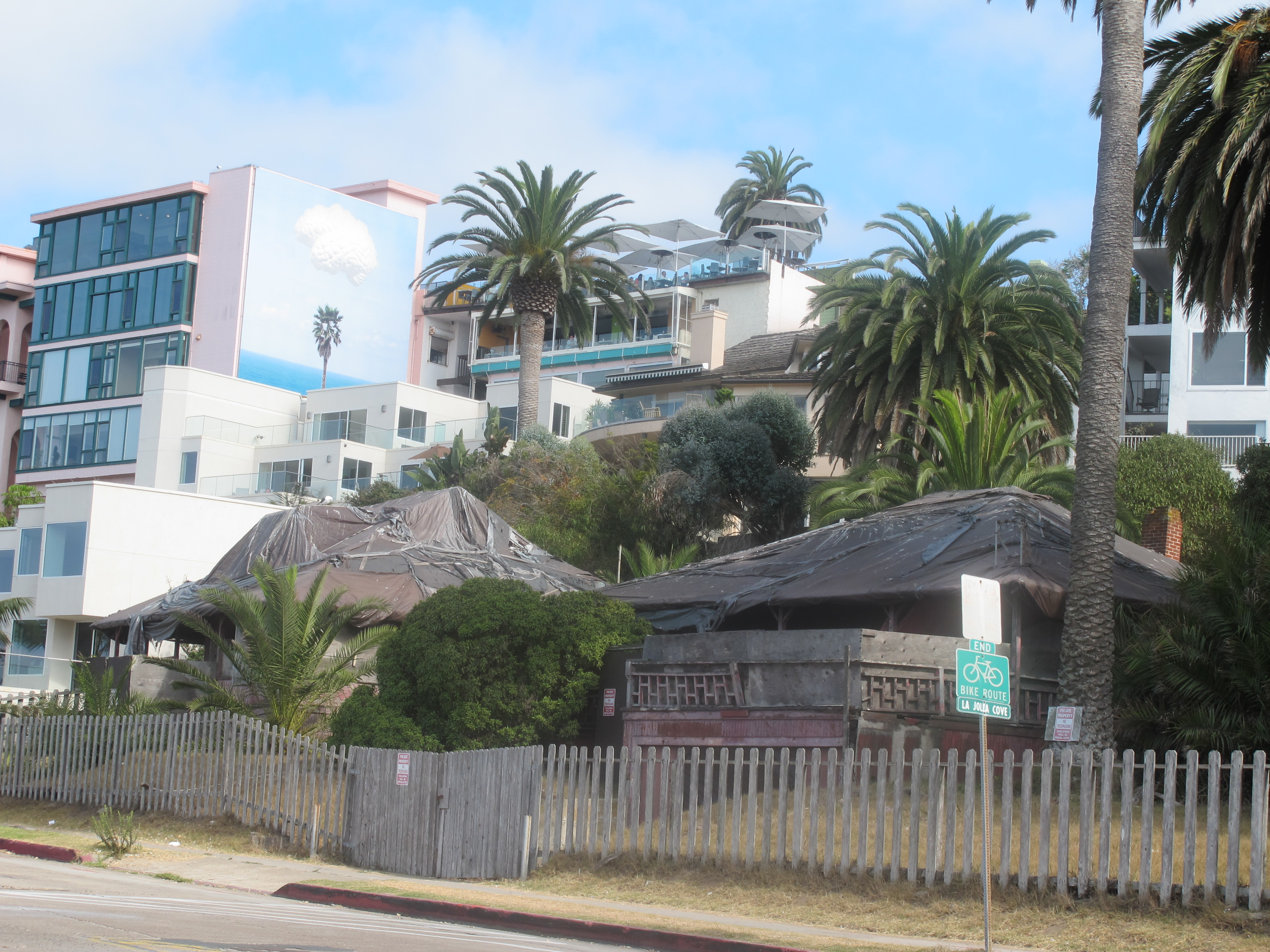
"Red Roost" and "Red Rest", two bungalow cottages built in 1894 on the road above La Jolla Cove. In recent years the cottages have been covered in tarpaulins.

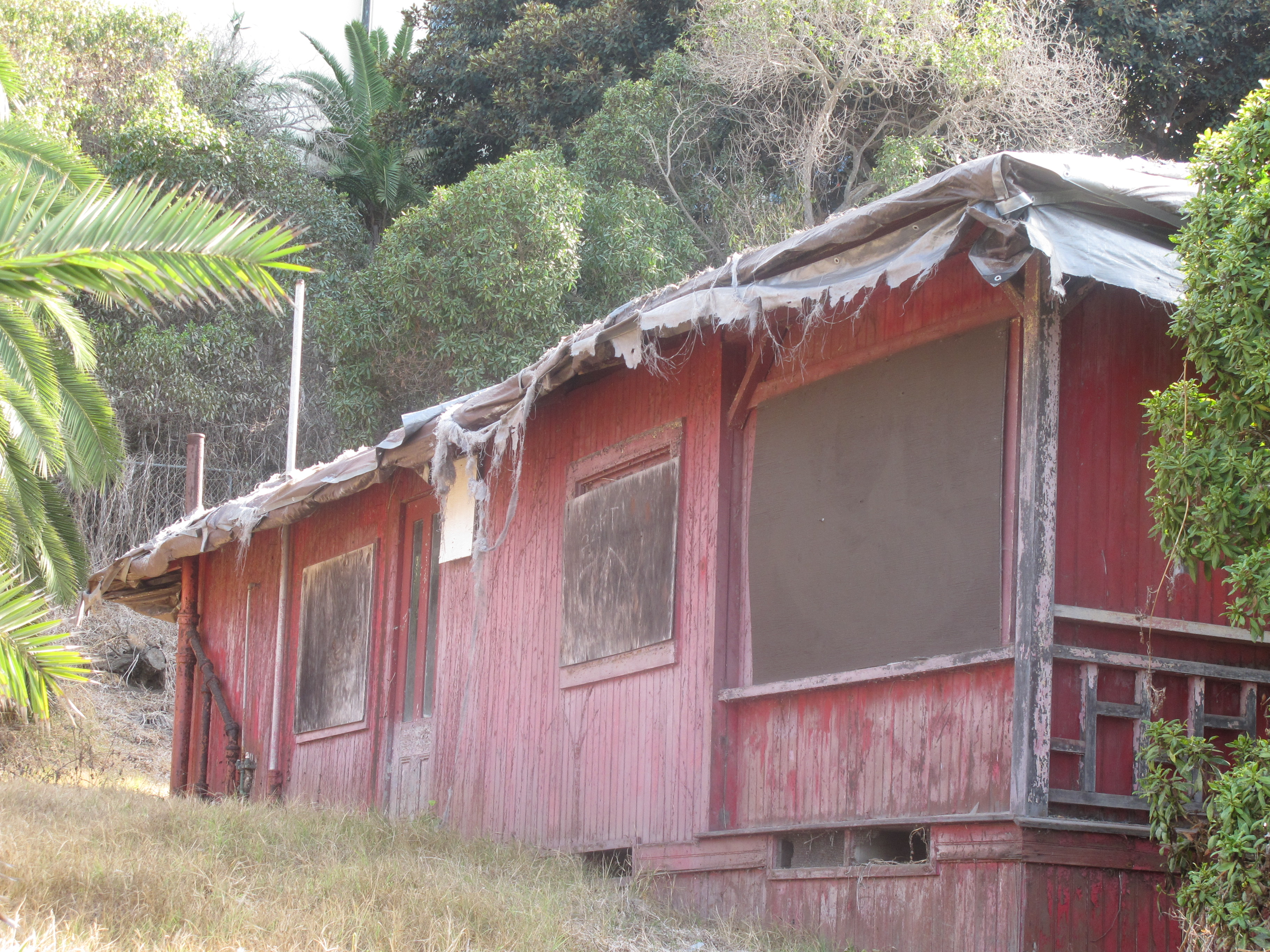
The side view of "Red Roost", a bungalow cottage built in 1894, one of two that still exist on the road above La Jolla Cove.

During the Mexican period of San Diego's history, La Jolla was mapped as pueblo land and contained about 60 lots. When California became a state in 1850, the La Jolla area was incorporated as part of the chartered City of San Diego. In 1870, Charles Dean acquired several of the pueblo lots and subdivided them into an area that became known as La Jolla Park. Dean was unable to develop the land and left San Diego in 1881. A real estate boom in the 1880s led speculators Frank T. Botsford and George W. Heald to further develop the sparsely settled area.

In the 1890s, the San Diego, Pacific Beach, and La Jolla Railway was built, connecting La Jolla to the rest of San Diego. La Jolla became known as a resort area. To attract visitors to the beach, the railway built facilities such as a bath house and a dance pavilion. Visitors were housed in small cottages and bungalows above La Jolla Cove, as well as a temporary tent city erected every summer. Two of the cottages that were built in 1894, the "Red Roost" and the "Red Rest", also known as the "Neptune and Cove Tea Room", still exist and are the oldest buildings in La Jolla that are still on their original site. The two cottages have been vacant since the 1980s, boarded up and covered in tarpaulins while their fate was debated. In November 2020 the Red Rest was largely destroyed by fire.

The La Jolla Park Hotel opened in 1893. The Hotel Cabrillo was built in 1908 by "Squire" James A. Wilson and was later incorporated into the La Valencia Hotel.

By 1900, La Jolla comprised 100 buildings and 350 residents. The first reading room (library) was built in 1898. A volunteer fire brigade was organized in 1907; the city of San Diego established a regular fire house in 1914. Livery stable owner Nathan Rannells served successively as La Jolla's volunteer fire captain, first police officer (the only San Diego police officer north of Mission Valley), and first postmaster.

La Jolla Elementary School began educating local children in 1896. The Bishop's School opened in 1909. La Jolla High School was established in 1922. Between 1951 and 1963, other elementary schools (Bird Rock, Decatur, Scripps, and Torrey Pines) were established in the area to ease overcrowding. The La Jolla Beach and Yacht Club (later the La Jolla Beach and Tennis Club) was built in 1927.

=== Ellen Browning Scripps ===
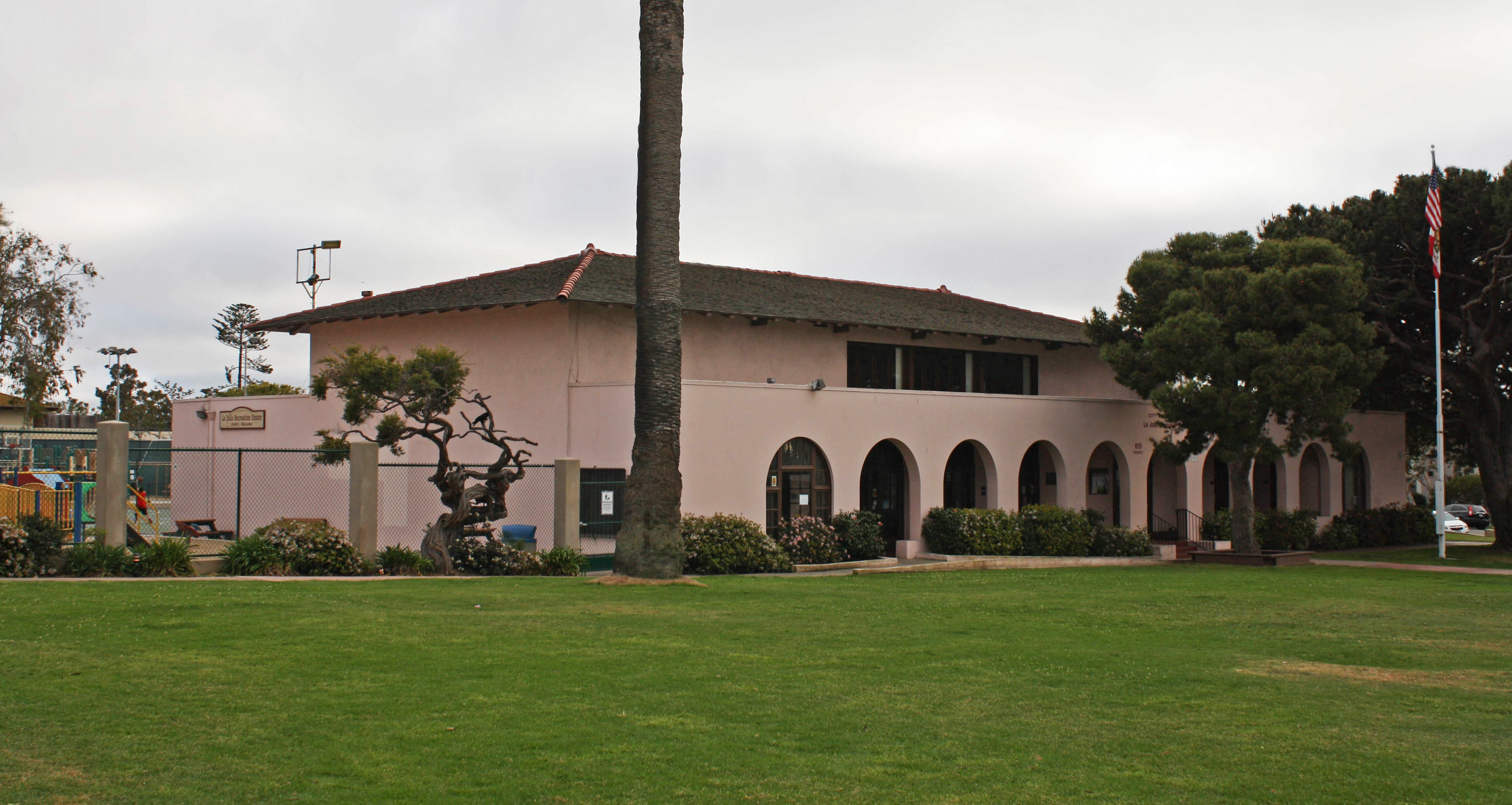
La Jolla Recreational Center.

In 1896 journalist and publisher Ellen Browning Scripps settled in La Jolla, where she lived for the last 35 years of her life. She was wealthy in her own right from her investments and writing, and she inherited a large sum from her brother George H. Scripps in 1900. She devoted herself to philanthropic endeavors, particularly those benefiting her adopted home of La Jolla. She commissioned many of La Jolla's most notable buildings, usually designed by Irving Gill or his nephew and partner Louis John Gill. Many of these buildings are now on the National Register of Historic Places or are listed as historic by the city of San Diego; these include the La Jolla Woman's Club (1914), the La Jolla Recreational Center (1915), the earliest buildings of The Bishop's School, and the Old Scripps Building at Scripps Institution of Oceanography, as well as her own residence, built in 1915 and now housing the Museum of Contemporary Art San Diego. Her donations also launched Scripps Memorial Hospital in 1924 (originally located on Prospect Street in La Jolla until it moved to its present site in 1964), the Scripps Metabolic Clinic (now Scripps Research), and the Children's Pool. Ellen Browning Scripps also founded Scripps College, a women's college, in 1926. Scripps College is located in Claremont in Los Angeles County (not to be confused with Clairemont, a neighborhood of San Diego).

=== Scripps Institution of Oceanography ===
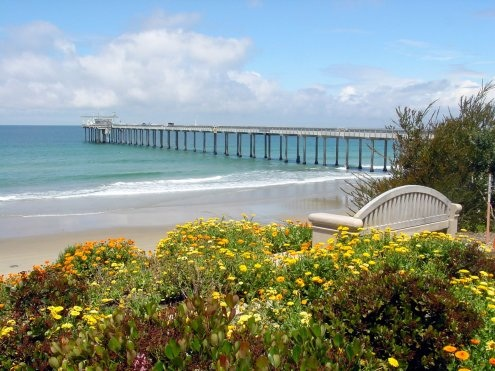
Scripps Institution of Oceanography pier.

Scripps Institution of Oceanography, one of the nation's oldest oceanographic institutes, was founded in 1903 by William Emerson Ritter, chair of the zoology department at the University of California, Berkeley, with financial support from Ellen Browning Scripps and her brother E. W. Scripps. At first the institution operated out of a boathouse in Coronado. In 1905, they purchased a 170-acre (69 ha) site in La Jolla, where the Institution still stands today. The first laboratory buildings there opened in 1907. The institution became part of the University of California in 1912. Ultimately, it became the nucleus for the establishment of the University of California, San Diego.

=== Camp Matthews ===
From 1917 through 1964, the United States Marine Corps maintained a military base in La Jolla. The base was used for marksmanship training and was known as Camp Calvin B. Matthews. During and after World War II, the population of La Jolla grew, causing residential development to draw close to the base, so that it became less and less suitable as a firing range because of risk to the adjacent civilian population. Meanwhile, the site was being eyed as a location for a proposed new campus of the University of California. In 1962, Camp Matthews was declared surplus by the Marine Corps. The base formally closed in 1964, and that same year, the first class of undergraduates enrolled in the University of California San Diego.

=== University of California, San Diego ===
Local civic leaders had long toyed with the idea of a San Diego campus of the University of California, and the quest became more definite following World War II. Scripps Institution of Oceanography, under its director Roger Revelle, had become an important defense contractor, and local aerospace companies like Convair were pressing for local training for their scientists and engineers. The state legislature proposed the idea in 1955, and the Regents of the university formally approved it in 1960. During the planning stage of the university's establishment, it was briefly known as the "University of California, La Jolla", but the name was changed to "University of California, San Diego" before its founding in 1960. The founding chancellor was Herbert York, named in 1961, and the second chancellor was John Semple Galbraith, named in 1964. The university was designed to have a "college" system; there are now eight colleges. The first college was established in 1965 and was named Revelle College after Roger Revelle, who is regarded as the "father" of the university. A medical school was established in 1968. The landmark Geisel Library with its Brutalist architecture opened in 1970. The university is the second largest employer in the city and (as of 2023) has the 8th largest research expenditure in the country.

=== Antisemitism ===
The Camp Matthews site for the university was selected with some hesitation; one of the concerns was "whether La Jollans in particular would lay aside old prejudices in order to welcome a culturally, ethnically, and religiously diverse professoriate into their midst". La Jolla had a history of restrictive housing policies, often specified in deeds and ownership documents. In La Jolla Shores and La Jolla Hermosa, only people with pure European ancestry could own property; this excluded Jews, who were not considered white. Such "restrictive covenants" were once fairly common throughout the United States; the 1948 Supreme Court case Shelley v. Kraemer ruled them to be unenforceable, and Congress outlawed them twenty years later via the Fair Housing Act (Title VII of the Civil Rights Act of 1968). However, realtors and property owners in La Jolla continued to use more subtle ways of preventing or discouraging Jews from owning property there. Revelle stated the issue bluntly: "You can't have a university without having Jewish professors. The Real Estate Broker's Association and their supporters in La Jolla had to make up their minds whether they wanted a university or an anti-Semitic covenant. You couldn't have both." The issue was overcome; La Jolla now boasts a thriving Jewish population, and there are four synagogues in La Jolla.

=== Mount Soledad cross ===
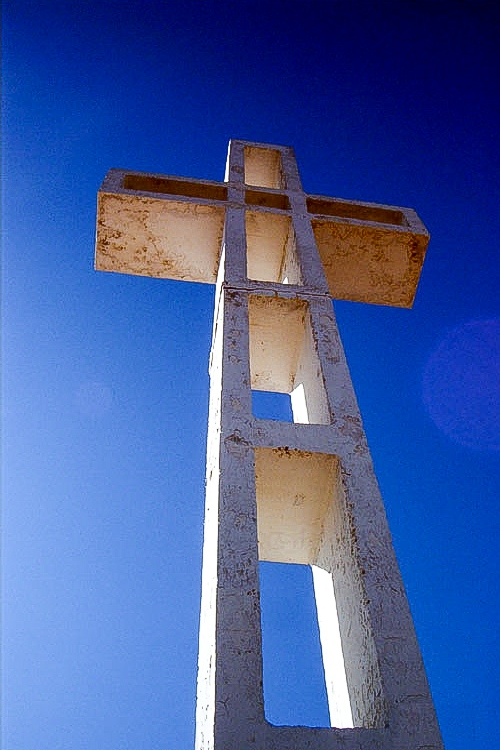
The Christian cross on Mount Soledad.

Mount Soledad is an 822-foot-tall (251 m) hill on the eastern edge of La Jolla and one of the highest points in San Diego. A large Christian cross was placed at the top in 1913 as a prominent landmark. It has been replaced twice, most recently in 1954 with a 29-foot-tall (8.8 m) cross (43 feet (13 m) tall including the base). Originally known as the "Mount Soledad Easter Cross", its presence on publicly owned land was challenged in the 1980s as a violation of the separation of church and state. Since then the cross has had a war memorial built around it and was renamed "Mount Soledad Veterans War Memorial".

The issue has been in almost continual litigation ever since, with the city attempting to sell or give away the land under the cross. By an act of Congress, the federal government took possession of it under eminent domain in 2006. The United States Court of Appeals for the Ninth Circuit declared the cross unconstitutional in 2011, and the Supreme Court of the United States declined to hear an appeal. In December 2013, U.S. District Judge Larry Burns ordered that the cross be removed within 90 days, but stayed the order pending a forthcoming appeal by the government.

On July 20, 2015, a group called the Mt. Soledad Memorial Association reported that it had bought the land under the cross from the Department of Defense for $1.4 million. On September 7, 2016, the 9th U.S. Circuit Court of Appeals issued a one-page ruling, ordering dismissal of the case and an end to all current appeals, stating that the case was now moot because the cross was no longer on government land. Both sides agreed that this decision puts a final end to the case.

=== Arts ===
La Jolla became an art colony in 1894 when Anna Held (also known as Anna Held Heinrich) established the Green Dragon Colony. This was a cluster of twelve rustic cottages that included The Green Dragon, Wahnfried, and The Ark, a boat-shaped structure with port holes and swinging bunks.

The La Jolla Playhouse was founded in 1947 by Gregory Peck, Dorothy McGuire, and Mel Ferrer. It became inactive in 1959, but was revived in 1983 on the University of California campus under the leadership of Des McAnuff. It now incorporates three theaters: the Mandell Weiss Theatre (1983), the Mandell Weiss Forum (1991) and the Potiker Theater (2005).

The Museum of Contemporary Art San Diego was founded in 1941 in La Jolla, in the former home of Ellen Browning Scripps (designed by Irving J. Gill). The museum has undergone several renovations and expansions, and is working on plans to triple its size.

The La Jolla Music Society was founded in 1941 as the Musical Arts Society of La Jolla by Nikolai Sokoloff, former conductor of the Cleveland Orchestra. It presented the premieres of commissioned works in the auditorium of La Jolla High School before presenting their concerts in the Sherwood Auditorium of the Museum of Contemporary Art San Diego. Since April 2019, the Conrad Prebys Performing Arts Center is the permanent home of La Jolla Music Society and hosts world-class performances presented by LJMS as well as other San Diego arts presenters. Additionally, The Conrad will see a wide range of conferences, corporate meetings, and private events.

== Geography ==
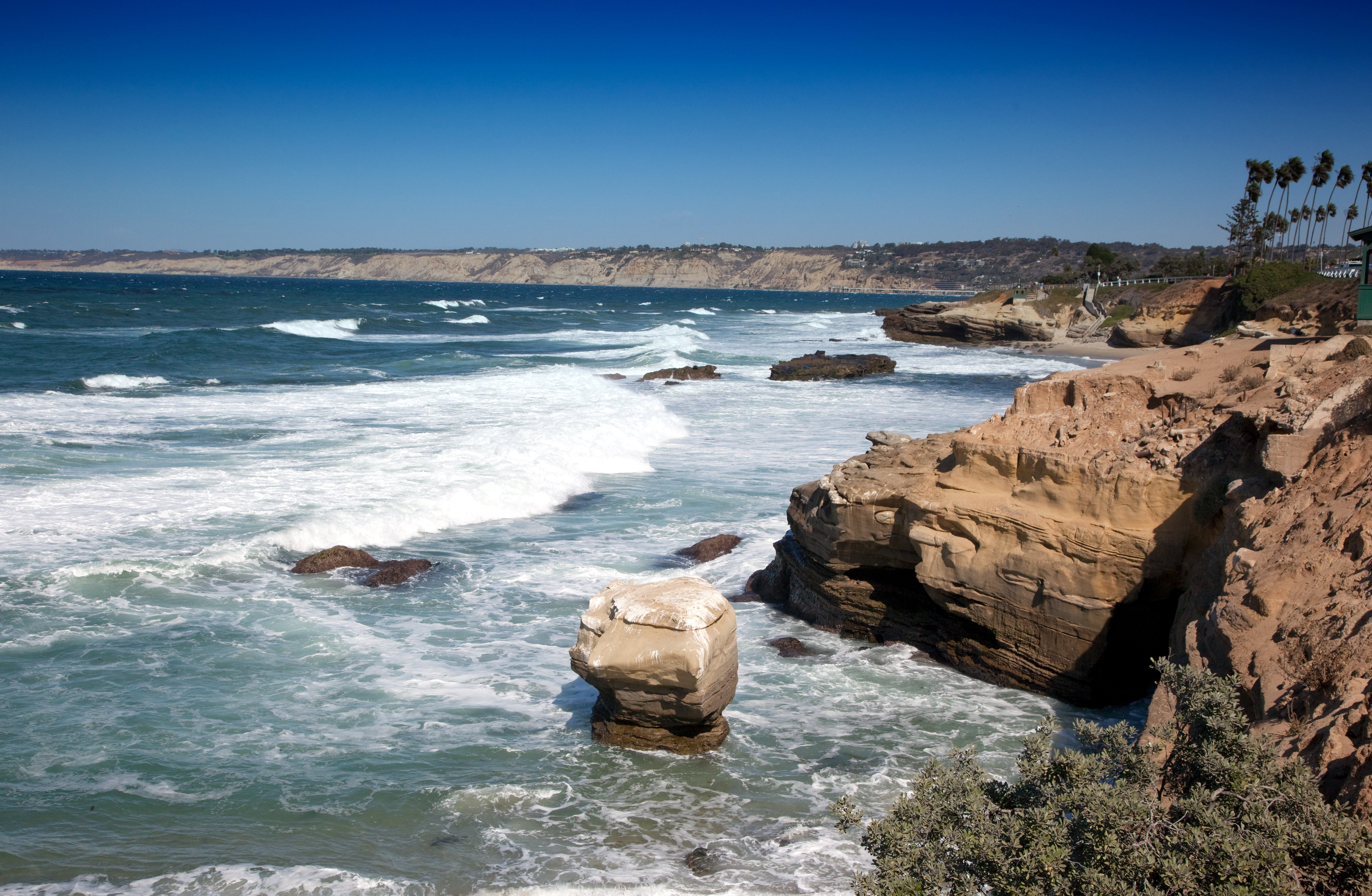
View looking north from above the Children's Pool.

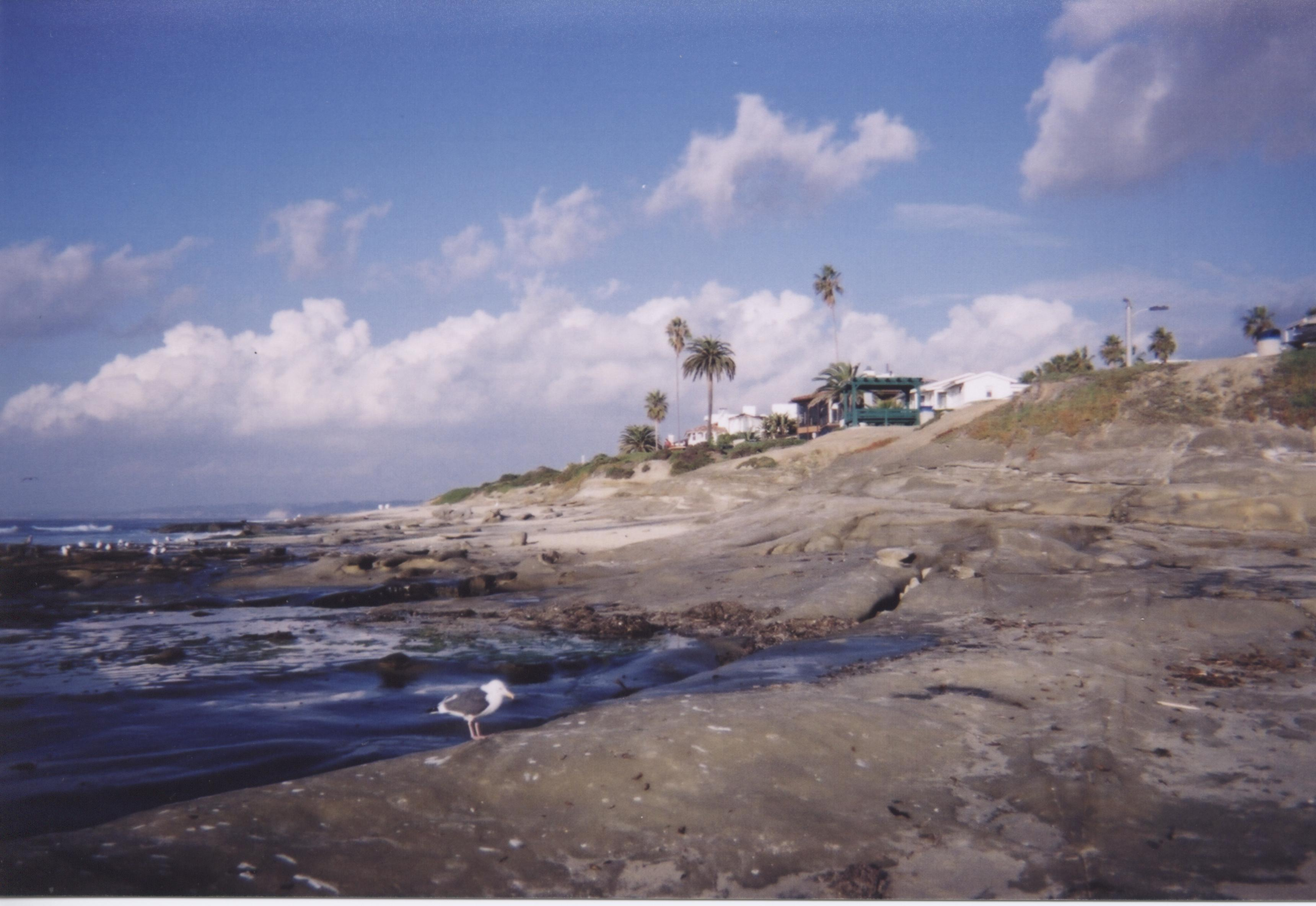
View from Horseshoe.

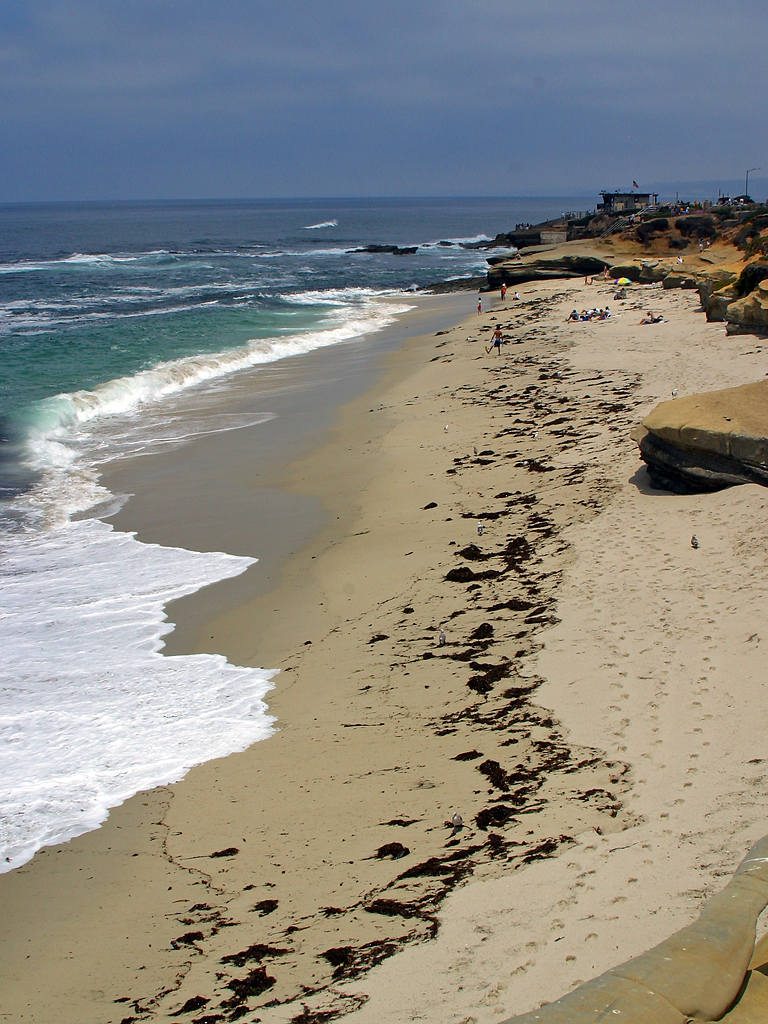
Wipeout Beach.

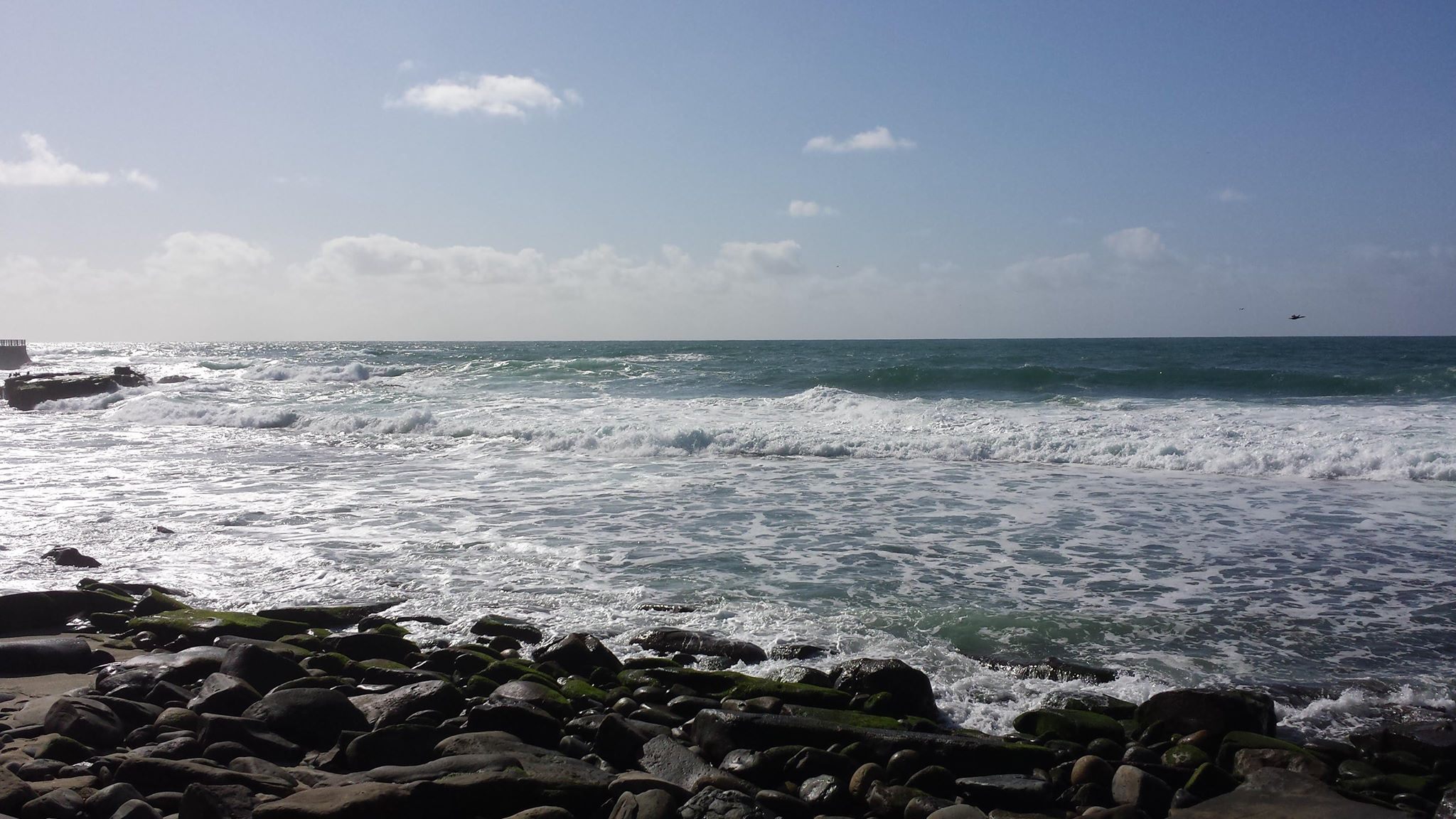
View from Coast Boulevard in between The Cave Store and Children's Pool.

=== Demarcation ===
The neighborhoods's border starts at Pacific Beach to the south and extends along the Pacific Ocean shoreline north to include Torrey Pines State Natural Reserve ending at Del Mar. La Jolla encompasses the neighborhoods of Bird Rock, Windansea Beach, the commercial center known as the Village of La Jolla, Muirlands, La Jolla Shores, La Jolla Farms, Torrey Pines, Mount Soledad and others.

The City of San Diego defines the neighborhood's eastern boundary as Gilman Drive and the Interstate 5 freeway and the northern boundary as UCSD.

The United States Postal Service defines a somewhat larger area, assigning the neighborhood the 92037 ZIP Code, recognizing it as a historically and geographically distinct area. Because it has its own ZIP code, addresses can read La Jolla, CA. It is the only neighborhood within the City of San Diego so recognized. Additionally, it is in the 919xx/920xx sequence used for suburban and rural ZIP Codes in San Diego County, rather than the 921xx sequence used for the remainder of the City of San Diego. These conditions sometimes lead to the erroneous impression that La Jolla is a separate city, rather than a part of San Diego. The 92037 ZIP code extends the northeasterly boundary to Genesee Avenue and the northerly boundary to Del Mar, California. The UCSD campus, also part of La Jolla, has ZIP Codes 92092 and 92093.

Despite the city and postal service definitions, La Jolla does not have universally accepted boundaries. In the 1980s, the trustees of Scripps Hospital voted to move the campus from downtown La Jolla to University City, east of Interstate 5 and not within the traditional boundaries of La Jolla. The governing documents of the hospital required it to be located in La Jolla, however. A court ruled that "La Jolla" exists as a "state of mind" and thus allowed the relocation of the hospital. Several businesses and housing developments located in the University City neighborhood of San Diego use "La Jolla" in their names.

=== Wildlife ===
La Jolla's offshore waters are home to diverse marine wildlife. Marine mammals, such as migratory gray, humpback and blue whales—harbor porpoises, dolphins (including, common dolphins, as well as rough-toothed, bottlenose, Pacific white-sided and Risso's dolphins) and orcas, can be found in the area. California sea lions and harbor seals are often seen hauled-out on the rocks, and their presence can lure bigger, predatory sharks.

Southern California also has many species of fish (such as garibaldi, sculpin), including sharks, such as clam-eating dogfish and leopard sharks and the great white shark. During the winter, great white sharks breed, hunting seals around the kelp forest, and sometimes coming closer to shore. For these reasons, piers, caves and buoys are areas that surfers avoid, as sharks in these locations can ambush pinnipeds diving back into the water. However, most encounters with great white sharks are uneventful.

Many of the marine animals live within and/or depend on the extensive offshore kelp forest, where scuba divers often explore. The kelp forests are also home to a number of invertebrate species, including sea urchins, abalone, sea stars and limpets to king crab and giant octopus. Green sea turtles and many migratory and resident sea and shorebirds, are also native to the area.

=== Geology ===
La Jolla is an area of mixed geology, including sandy beaches and rocky shorelines. The area is occasionally susceptible to flooding and ocean storms, as occurred in January and December 2010.

Mount Soledad, an 823-foot (251 m) mountain, lies between Interstate 5 to the east and the Pacific Ocean to the west. It is mostly within the community of La Jolla where the northern and eastern slopes form a sharp escarpment along the Rose Canyon Fault. The community of Pacific Beach is on the southern slope. There are many narrow roads and hundreds of homes overlooking the ocean on its slopes. It is the home of the Mount Soledad Cross, built in 1954, later designated a Korean War Memorial, that became the center of a controversy over the display of religious symbols on government property.

The La Jolla ocean front has an alternating rugged and sandy coastline that serves as a habitat for many wild seal congregations. There are many beaches accessible from the cliffs all throughout the coast of La Jolla.

=== Climate ===
Climate data for La Jolla, San Diego
Month	Jan	Feb	Mar	Apr	May	Jun	Jul	Aug	Sep	Oct	Nov	Dec	Year
Record high °F (°C)	89 (32)	91 (33)	93 (34)	99 (37)	101 (38)	103 (39)	108 (42)	104 (40)	111 (44)	107 (42)	100 (38)	88 (31)	111 (44)
Mean daily maximum °F (°C)	66 (19)	67 (19)	68 (20)	69 (21)	70 (21)	73 (23)	77 (25)	79 (26)	78 (26)	75 (24)	71 (22)	67 (19)	72 (22)
Mean daily minimum °F (°C)	47 (8)	49 (9)	51 (11)	54 (12)	58 (14)	61 (16)	64 (18)	66 (19)	64 (18)	59 (15)	51 (11)	47 (8)	56 (13)
Record low °F (°C)	29 (−2)	36 (2)	38 (3)	40 (4)	45 (7)	50 (10)	55 (13)	57 (14)	51 (11)	43 (6)	36 (2)	34 (1)	29 (−2)
Average precipitation inches (mm)	2.73 (69)	2.44 (62)	2.66 (68)	0.93 (24)	0.28 (7.1)	0.09 (2.3)	0.03 (0.76)	0.10 (2.5)	0.27 (6.9)	0.48 (12)	1.23 (31)	1.53 (39)	12.77 (324)

== Demographics ==
According to United States Census Bureau figures, the ethnic/racial makeup of La Jolla is 82.5% White, 0.8% Black, 0.2% American Indian, 11.2% Asian, 0.1% Pacific Islander, 2.0% any other race, and 3.1% two or more races. Latinos, who may be of any race, form 7.2% of La Jolla's population. There is also a sizable Persian population in La Jolla.

La Jolla had the highest home prices in the nation in 2008 and 2009, according to a survey by Coldwell Banker. The survey compares the cost of a standardized four-bedroom home in communities across the country. The average price for such a home in La Jolla was reported as US$1.842 million in 2008 and US$2.125 million in 2009.

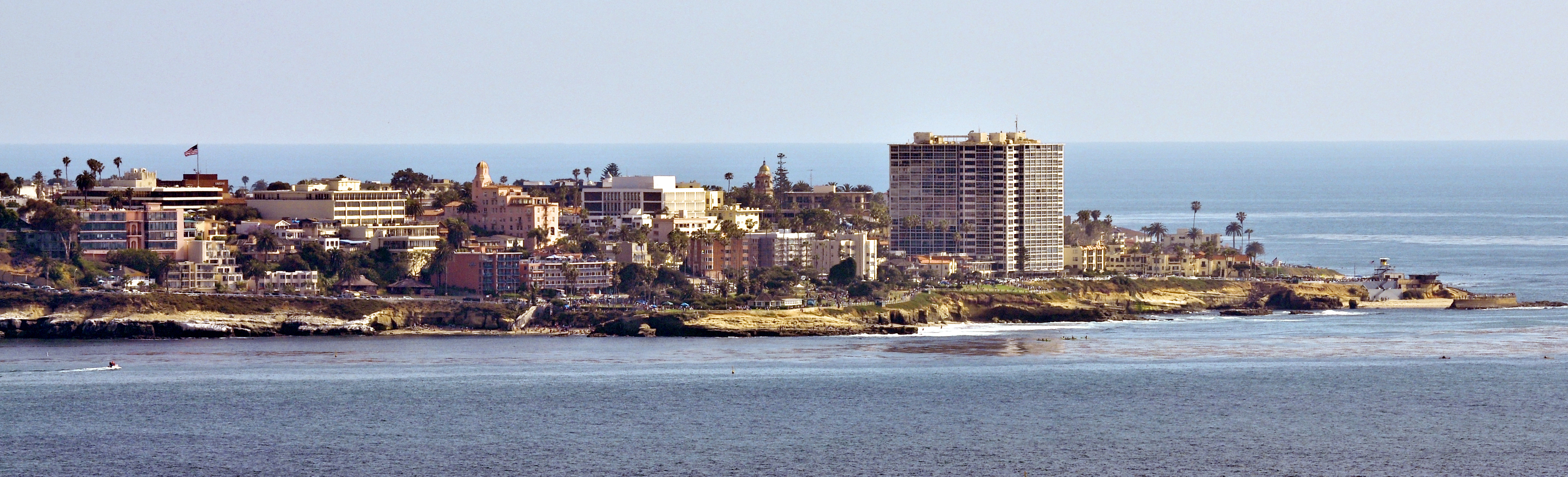
View of La Jolla

== Neighborhoods ==
- La Jolla Farms — This northern La Jolla neighborhood is just west of UCSD. It includes Torrey Pines Gliderport, the Salk Institute for Biological Studies, and a group of expensive homes on the cliffs above Black's Beach (one of which is the Audrey Geisel University House).
- La Jolla Shores — The residential area and Scripps Institution of Oceanography campus along La Jolla Shores Beach and east up the hillside. Also includes a small business district of shops and restaurants along Avenida de la Playa.
- La Jolla Heights — The homes on the hills overlooking La Jolla Shores. No businesses.
- Hidden Valley — Lower portion of Mount Soledad on the northern slopes. No businesses.
- Country Club — Lower Mt. Soledad on the northwest side, including the La Jolla Country Club golf course.
- Village — Also called Village of La Jolla (not to be confused with La Jolla Village) the "downtown" business district area, including most of La Jolla's shops and restaurants, and the immediately surrounding higher density and single family residential areas.
- Beach-Barber Tract — The coastal section from Windansea Beach to the Village. A few shops and restaurants along La Jolla Boulevard.
- Lower Hermosa — Coastal strip south of Beach-Barber Tract. No businesses.
- Bird Rock — Southern coastal La Jolla, and the very lowest slopes of Mt. Soledad in the area. Notable for shops and restaurants along La Jolla Boulevard, five traffic roundabouts on La Jolla Boulevard, coastal bluffs, and surfing areas just two blocks off the main drag.
- Muirlands — Relatively large area on western middle slope of Mt. Soledad. No businesses.
- La Jolla Mesa — A strip on the lower southern side of Mt. Soledad, bordering Pacific Beach. No businesses.
- La Jolla Alta — A master-planned development east of La Jolla Mesa. No businesses.
- Soledad South — Southeastern slopes of Mt. Soledad, all the way up to the top, east of La Jolla Alta.
- Muirlands West — The small neighborhood between Muirlands to the south, and Country Club to the north. No businesses.
- Upper Hermosa — Southwestern La Jolla, north of Bird Rock and east of La Jolla Blvd.
- La Jolla Village — Not to be confused with the Village (of La Jolla). In northeast La Jolla, east of La Jolla Heights, west of I-5 and south of UCSD. The neighborhood's namesake is the La Jolla Village Square shopping and residential mall, which includes La Jolla's only remaining movie theater.

== Community groups ==
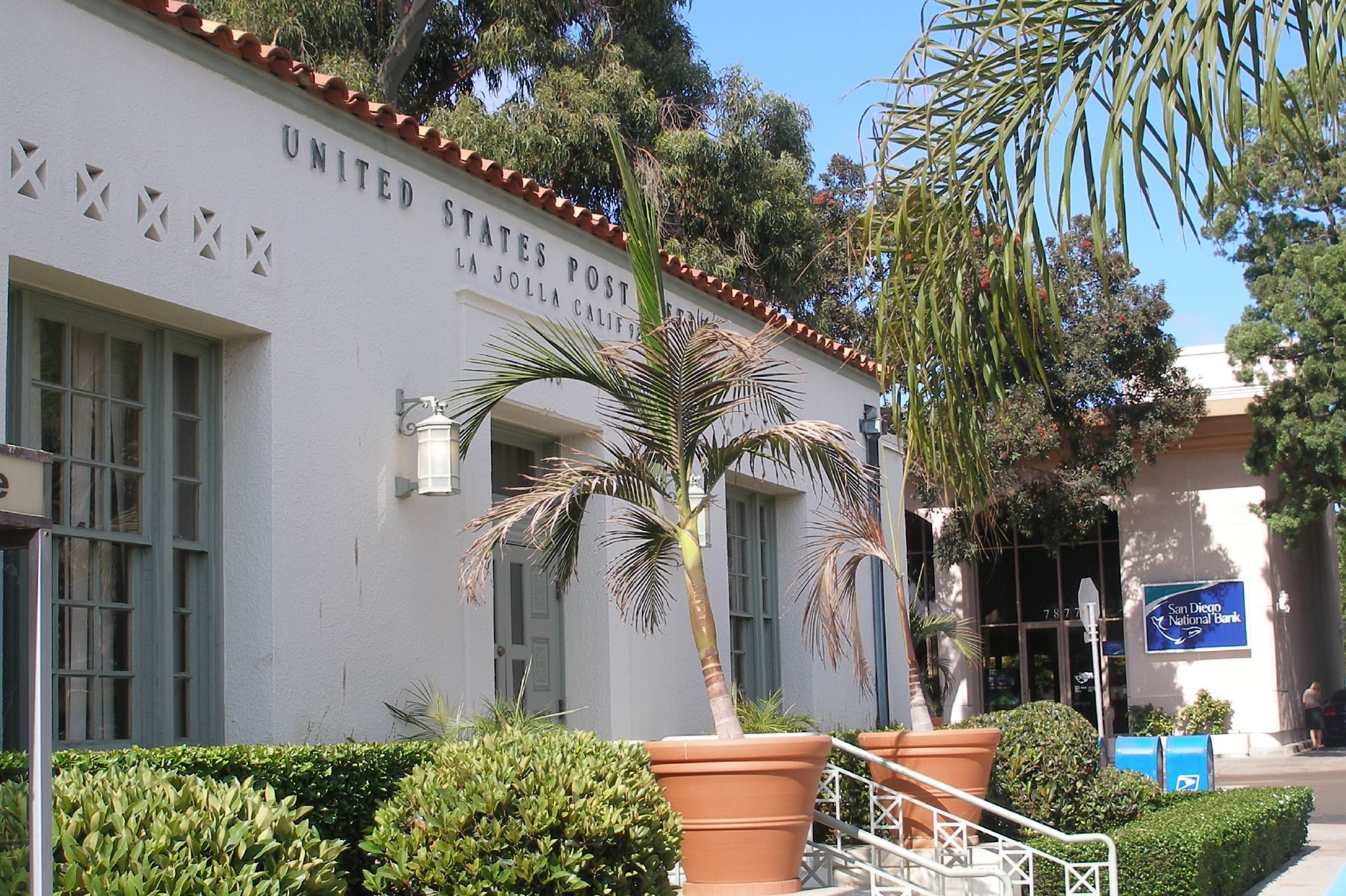
The historic La Jolla post office.

The La Jolla Community Planning Association advises the city council, Planning Commission, City Planning Department as well as other governmental agency as appropriate in the initial preparation, adoption of, implementation of, or amendment to the General or Community Plan as it pertains to the La Jolla area as well as review specific development proposals. The nonprofit La Jolla Town Council represents the interests of La Jolla businesses and residents that belong to the council. The Bird Rock Community Council serves the Bird Rock neighborhood, while the La Jolla Shores Association serves the La Jolla Shores neighborhood. La Jolla Village Merchants Association, Inc. is a non-profit organization formed in February 2011 to manage the La Jolla Village Business Improvement District for the City of San Diego.

Community organizations include Independent La Jolla, a membership-based citizens group seeking to secede from the city of San Diego. Service clubs in La Jolla include Kiwanis, Rotary, La Jolla Woman's Club and the Social Service League of La Jolla, to name a few.

La Jolla is a subsidiary location for Chicago-based Linking Efforts Against Drugs (LEAD), a national drug-prevention organization recognized nationally for its success in reducing substance use and abuse among teens.

La Jolla is the home of InspirED, a community-focused EdTech company that supports schools in supporting their students' mental health through therapeutic services, educational opportunities, and technology.

== Attractions and activities ==
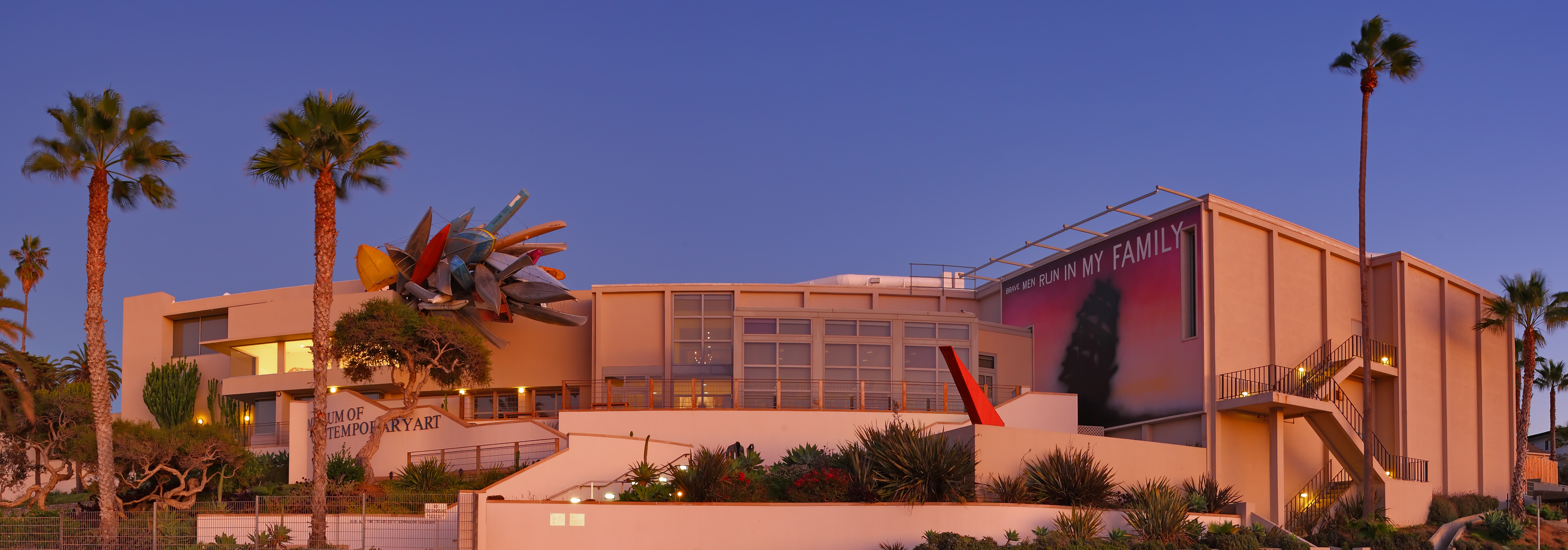
Museum of Contemporary Art - La Jolla.

La Jolla is the location of Torrey Pines Golf Course, the site each January or February of a PGA Tour event known as The Sentry. Torrey Pines also hosted the 2008 and 2021 U.S. Open. Nearby is the de facto nude beach, Black's Beach. Torrey Pines Gliderport is popular, where people fly and watch glider sailplanes.

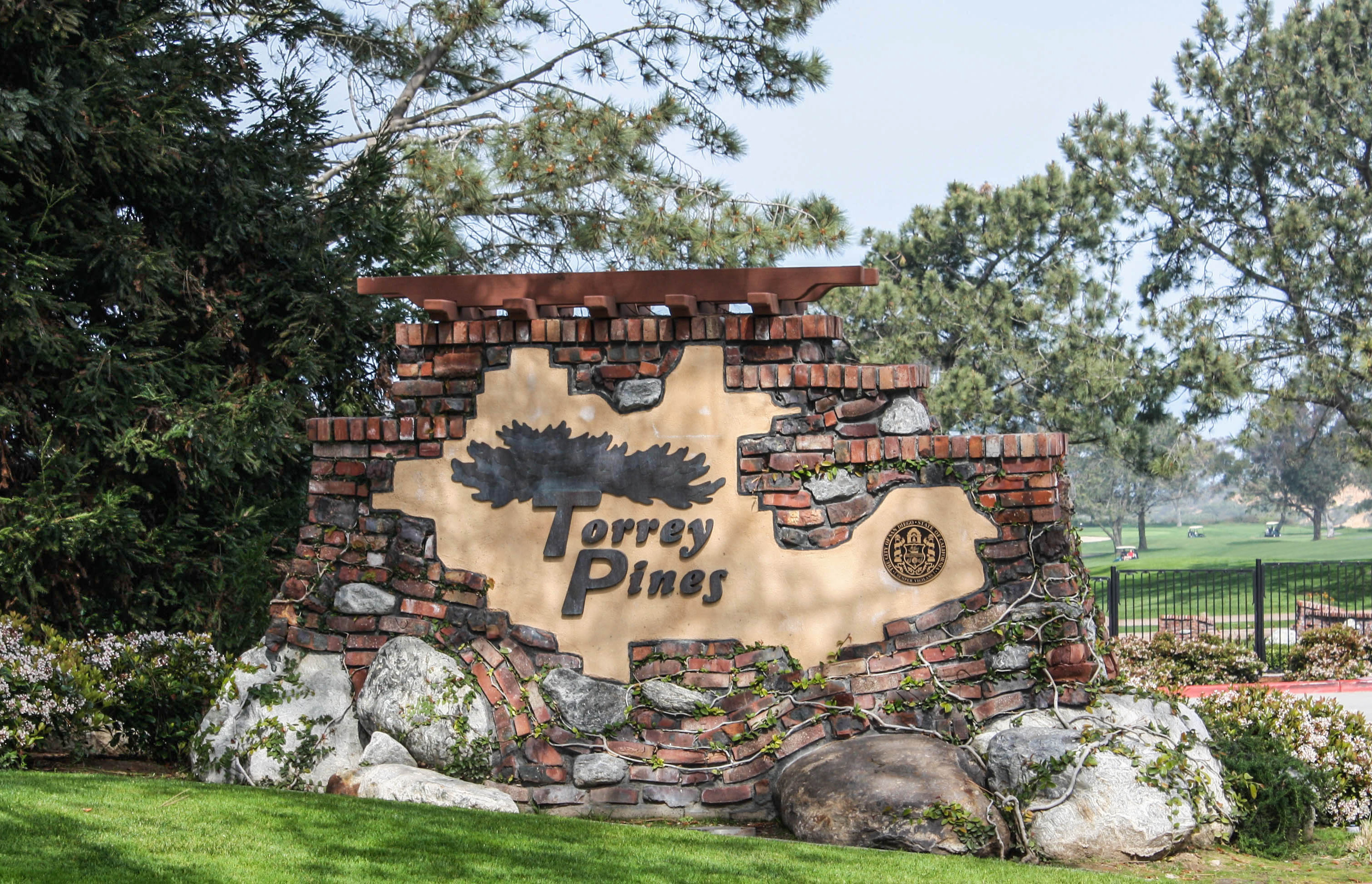
Torrey Pines Golf Course.

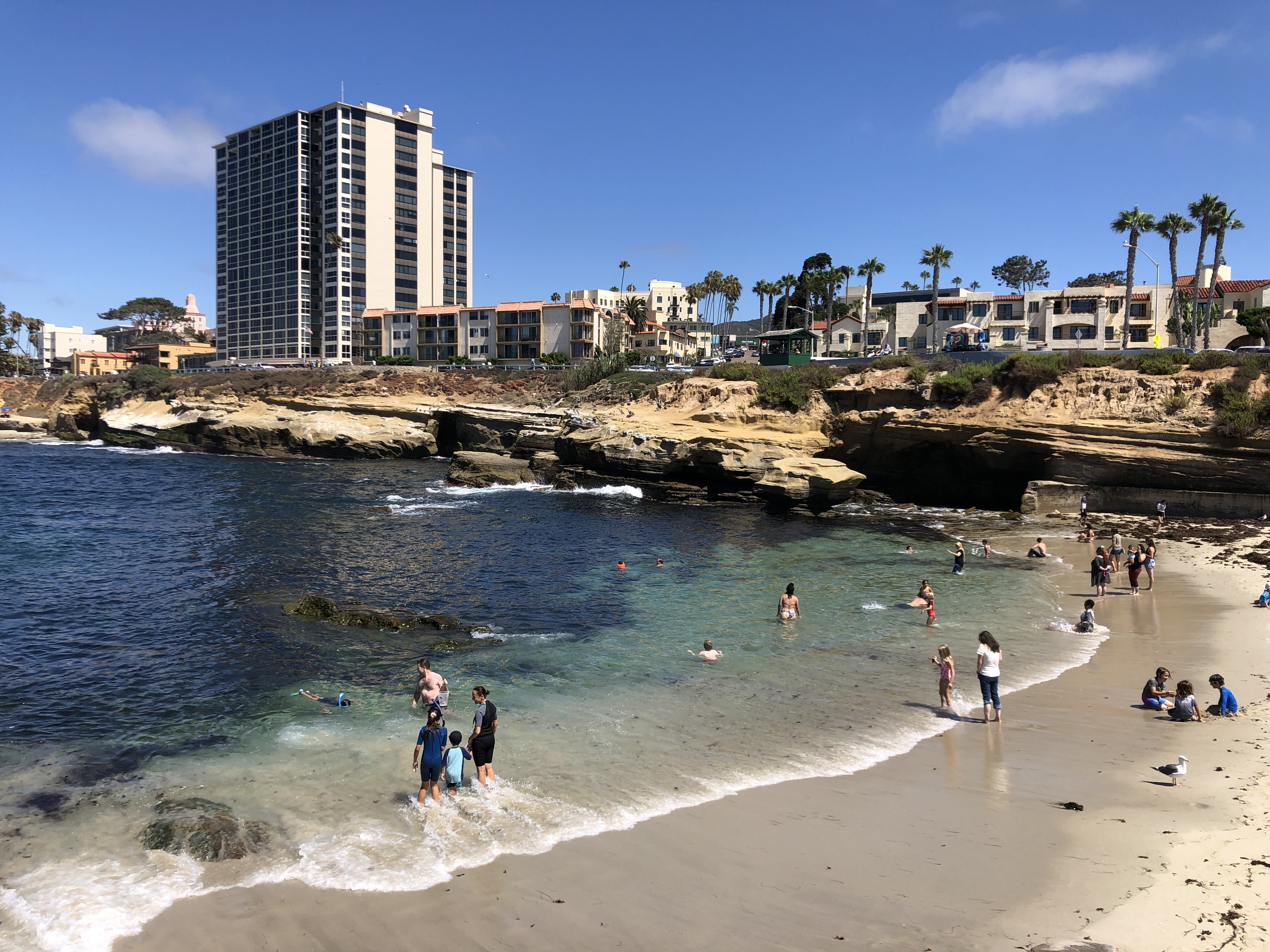
La Jolla Cove.

Downtown La Jolla is noted for jewelry stores, boutiques, upmarket restaurants and hotels. Prospect Street and Girard Avenue are also shopping and dining districts. The Museum of Contemporary Art, founded in 1941, is located above the waterfront in what was originally the 1915 residence of philanthropist Ellen Browning Scripps. The museum has a permanent collection with more than 3,500 post-1950 American and European works, including paintings, works on paper, sculptures, photographic art, design objects and video works. The museum was renamed Museum of Contemporary Art San Diego in 1990 to recognize its regional significance.

In 2011, the La Jolla Community Foundation commissioned various artists to contribute to the scenery of the town, through various murals. Some of the artists that are featured in the series are John Baldessari, Julian Opie and Kim MacConnel. There are 11 murals in the series, all of which will be on display for two years.

The La Jolla Fencing Academy opened in 2017 on Villa La Jolla Drive. Among its coaches is two-time world junior saber champion, and 2023 US saber champion, Konstantin Lokhanov.

La Jolla is home to another community landmark, a building nicknamed the Mushroom House. The Mushroom House has gone through restoration throughout the past couple of years. One noticeable change being during the COVID pandemic, when it went through a full scrub and was painted over any graffiti and/or harmful language. The Mushroom House is located on the La Jolla Shores coastline, more on the Northern side where it hits Black's Beach. You are able to access the Mushroom House from a trailhead down to a beach trailhead located in Torrey Pines, but as a reminder, it is still considered private property, and guests and trespassers will be prosecuted.

Beaches and ocean access include Windansea Beach, La Jolla Shores, La Jolla Cove and Children's Pool Beach. For many years, La Jolla has been the host of a rough water swim at La Jolla Cove. Black's Beach, one of the only nude beaches in the area, is one of the most popular lesser known surfer beaches throughout the year. Sunset Cliffs is a location popular amongst locals and tourists for views of the sunset off to the horizon past the cliffs and caves below. La Jolla Shores is located next to Scripps Pier and is close to many small shops, homes and restaurants. La Jolla Cove is the most popular tourist destination in La Jolla, featuring many snorkelers, swimmers and wildlife, such as seals. The La Jolla Concours d'Elegance auto show is hosted at La Jolla Cove annually. All of the popular beaches and coastal access points, listed from north to south, include:

- Torrey Pines State Natural Reserve
- Black's Beach (a de facto nude beach)
- Scripps, near the Scripps Institution of Oceanography
- La Jolla Shores
- La Jolla Beach & Tennis Club
- La Jolla Cove
- Boomers Beach
- Shell Beach
- Children's Pool Beach
- Wipeout Beach
- Horseshoes
- Marine Street Beach
- Windansea Beach
- Bird Rock

== Transportation ==
The San Diego Trolley light rail system has four stops on the Blue Line located in the La Jolla neighborhood:

- Nobel Drive, which serves the La Jolla Village Square shopping center in the La Jolla Village neighborhood.
- VA Medical Center, which serves the Veteran Affairs hospital of the same name next to UC San Diego.
- UC San Diego Central Campus, located in the center of the university of the same name.
- UC San Diego Health La Jolla, located near Scripps Memorial Health La Jolla, Jacobs Medical Center, the Moores Cancer Center, and the UC San Diego East Campus (contains the UC San Diego Health La Jolla campus of hospitals & medical facilities, and the Preuss School).

These four stations were opened on November 21, 2021, when the Blue Line was extended nine stops north from Old Town Transit Center to serve areas such as La Jolla Village, UC San Diego, and University City.

== Education ==
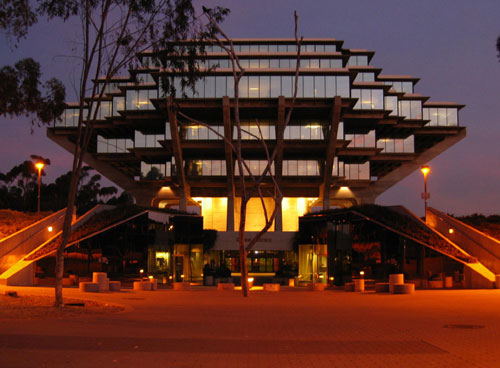
UCSD's distinctive Geisel Library, named after Theodor Seuss Geisel ("Dr. Seuss") and featured in UCSD's logo

=== Higher education ===
The University of California San Diego is the center of higher education in La Jolla. The campus' name was briefly UC La Jolla during the planning stage of the university's development. UCSD includes Scripps Institution of Oceanography and the San Diego Supercomputer Center.

National University is also headquartered in La Jolla, with several academic campuses located throughout the county and the state. Among the several research institutes near UCSD and in the nearby Torrey Pines Science Park are Scripps Research Institute, the Sanford Burnham Prebys Medical Discovery Institute (formerly called the La Jolla Cancer Research Foundation), La Jolla Institute for Allergy and Immunology (LJI), and the Salk Institute for Biological Studies.

=== Other schools ===
La Jolla is served by the San Diego Unified School District. Public schools include La Jolla High School, La Jolla Elementary, Muirlands Middle School, Torrey Pines Elementary, and Bird Rock Elementary, as well as Preuss School, a public charter school. The community's prep schools are The Bishop's School, The Children's School, Delphi Academy, Stella Maris Academy, The Gillispie School, and the Evans School. La Jolla Country Day School is located in the nearby community of University City.

== Religious institutions ==
Christian:

- All Hallows Catholic Church
- Assembly of God
- Christian Science Church
- Congregational Church (the first church built; burned down in 1915 and re-built in 1916 at 1216 Cave Street)
- Barabbas Road Church
- First Baptist Church
- La Jolla Christian Fellowship
- La Jolla Lutheran Church
- La Jolla Presbyterian Church
- La Jolla Religious Society of Friends
- La Jolla United Methodist Church
- Mary, Star of the Sea Catholic church
- Prince Chapel by the Sea (African Methodist Episcopal Church)
- St. James by-the-Sea Episcopal
- St. John Church of God in Christ
- Torrey Pines Christian Church
- The Church Of Jesus Christ of Latter-day Saints San Diego California Temple
- University Lutheran Church

Jewish:

- Congregation Beth El
- Congregation Adat Yeshurun
- Chabad Jewish Center of La Jolla

== Business and media ==
- La Jolla (under the fictionalized name "Esmerelda") is the setting for Raymond Chandler's final Philip Marlowe novel, Playback, published in 1958. Chandler lived in La Jolla for the previous decade. La Jolla's Hotel del Charro becomes "Rancho Descansado" in the novel. A number of landmarks described can still be found today.
- La Jolla was home to the comic book publisher WildStorm Productions, from its founding by Jim Lee in 1993, until its closing in 2012 when DC Comics, which had purchased the publisher as an imprint in 1998, absorbed the company and moved the office to Burbank, California.
- La Jolla is the base for the Sundt Memorial Foundation, a national organization aimed at discouraging youth from getting involved in drugs.
- La Jolla is also a subsidiary location for Chicago-based Linking Efforts Against Drugs (LEAD), a national drug-prevention organization recognized nationally for its success in reducing substance use and abuse among teens.
- La Jolla is the home of InspirED, an EdTech company that supports schools in supporting their students' mental health through therapeutic services, educational opportunities, and technology.
- La Jolla is mentioned in the Beach Boys' 1963 song Surfin' U.S.A. and in The Network's 2003 song Spike.
- "La Jolla" is the name of a song on Wilbur Soot's 2020 album Your City Gave Me Asthma.

=== Film ===
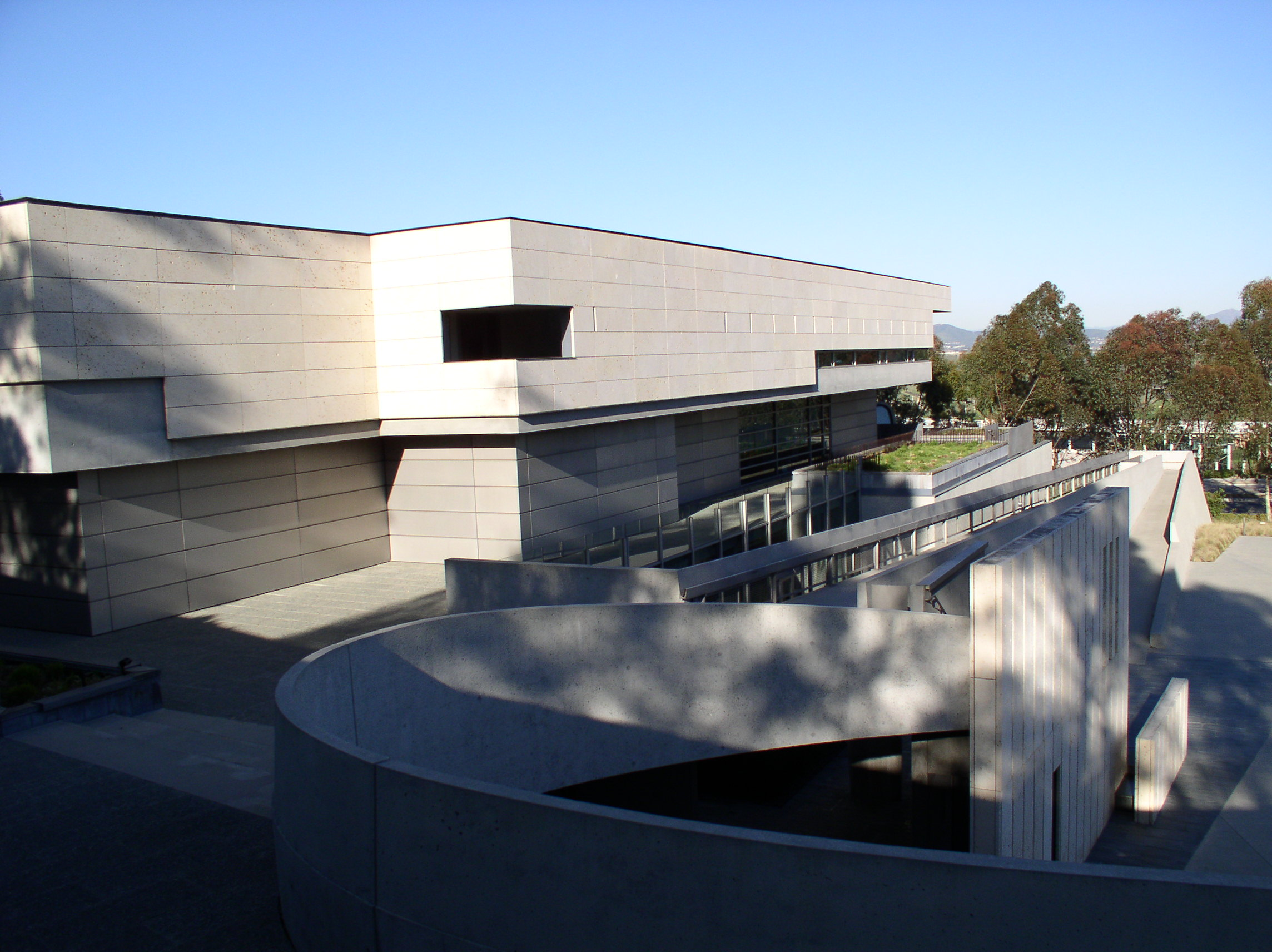
The Neurosciences Institute was a filming location for The Cell (2000)

- Laboratory scenes for the movie The Cell (2000) were filmed at The Neurosciences Institute in La Jolla.
- La Jolla is one of the backdrops in the movie Traffic (2000).
- Scenes for the movie The Samuel Project (2018) were filmed in La Jolla.
- The movie Hemet, or the Landlady Don't Drink Tea (2023) is set in Riverside County, California, but some scenes were filmed at the director's home in La Jolla.

=== Television ===
- La Jolla is the setting for the 2011 season of The Real World: San Diego, the twenty-sixth season of the long-running MTV reality television series.
- The Netflix sitcom Grace and Frankie is set in La Jolla, although filming takes place in other parts of California.
- Disney+'s Big Shot takes place in La Jolla.

== Notable people ==
La Jolla has been the home to many notable people, including prominent scientists, business people, artists, writers, surfers and performers.

== See also ==
- List of San Diego Historical Landmarks in La Jolla
- Birch Aquarium
- La Jolla Historical Society
