= David Sorensen =

David Sorensen may refer to:

- David E. Sorensen (1933–2014), general authority of The Church of Jesus Christ of Latter-day Saints
- David G. Sorensen (1937–2011), Canadian artist
