= San Diego California Temple =

LDS Church temple

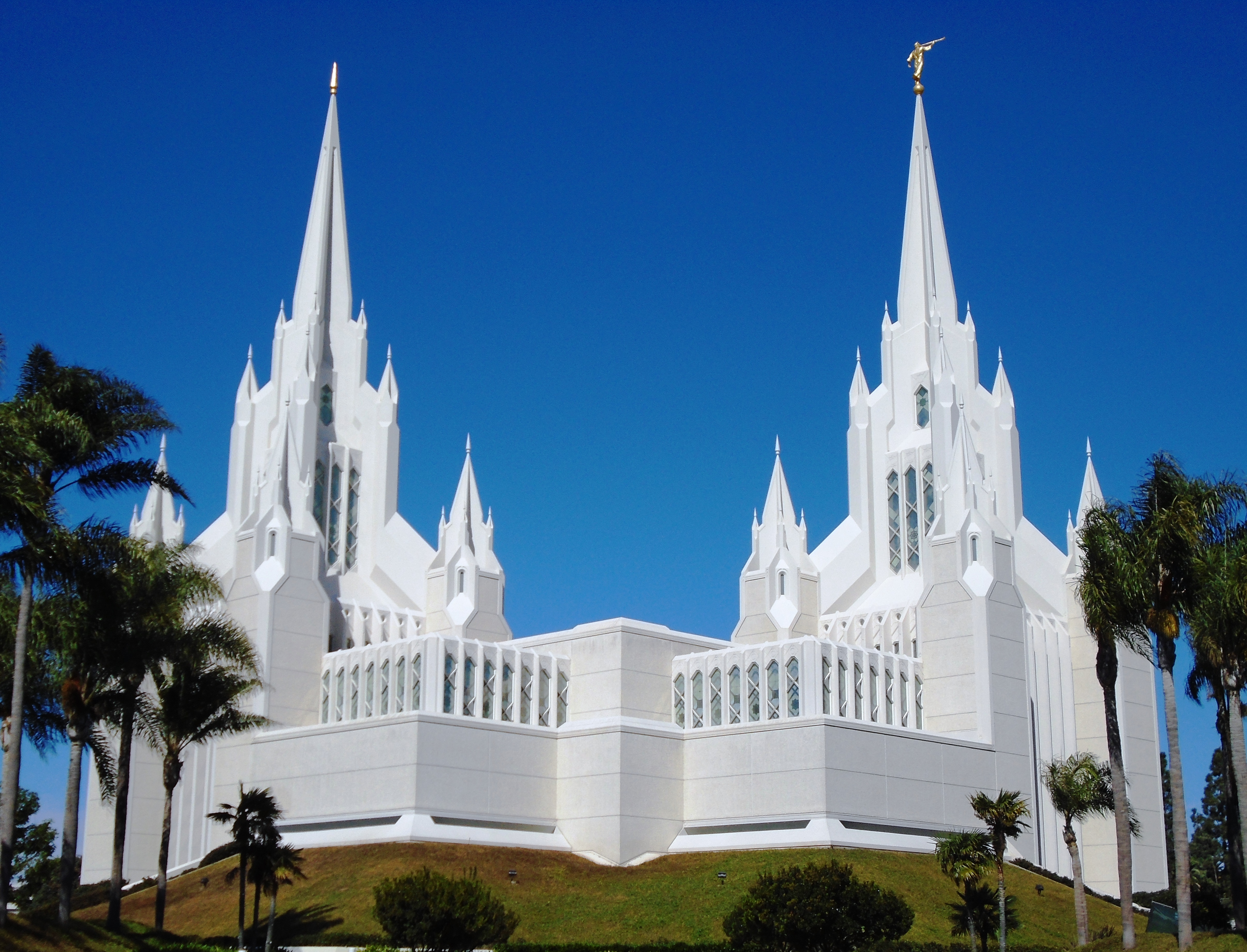
- Interactive map of San Diego California Temple
- Number: 45
- Dedication: 25 April 1993, by Gordon B. Hinckley
- Site: 7.2 acres (2.9 ha)
- Floor area: 58,005 ft^{2} (5,388.8 m^{2})
- Height: 169 ft (52 m)
- Official website • News & images

Church chronology
| ← Toronto Ontario Temple | San Diego California Temple | → Orlando Florida Temple |

Additional information
- Announced: 7 April 1984, by Gordon B. Hinckley
- Groundbreaking: 27 February 1988, by Ezra Taft Benson
- Open house: 20 February–3 April 1993; 18 June-11 July 2026
- Rededicated: 23 August 2026, by D. Todd Christofferson
- Current president: Richard G. Whittier (2026-present)
- Designed by: William S. Lewis, Jr.
- Location: San Diego, California, United States
- Coordinates: 32°51′59.1″N 117°13′43.3″W
- Exterior finish: Marble chips in plaster
- Design: Modern, two main towers
- Baptistries: 1
- Ordinance rooms: 4 (stationary)
- Sealing rooms: 6
- Clothing rental: Yes

The San Diego California Temple is the 45th operating temple of the Church of Jesus Christ of Latter-day Saints, located in San Diego, California, United States. It was the third to be built in California, following the Los Angeles and Oakland temples.

Plans to construct the temple were announced by Gordon B. Hinckley, a counselor in the church's First Presidency, on April 7, 1984, during general conference.

After construction was completed, a public open house was held from February 20 to April 3, 1993. Approximately 720,000 visitors toured the temple during the open house. In 1993, the temple was named "Headliner of the Year" in the landmark category by the San Diego Press Club, and publicity surrounding the open house received a Silver Anvil Award from the Public Relations Society of America. It was dedicated by Hinckley, with 23 sessions held from April 25 to April 30, 1993.

Located near the La Jolla community of San Diego, the temple is a Gothic-inspired structure with two main spires and four smaller spires at the base of each tower. The eastern spire has a statue of the angel Moroni on the top. The temple contains approximately 59,000 square feet (5481 m^{2}) of interior space and is recognized as a prominent landmark along Interstate 5.

Following nearly three decades of operation, the temple was closed in 2023 for an extensive renovation project. With renovation completed, a public open house was held from June 18 to July 11, 2026, with the rededication scheduled for August 23, 2026.

== History ==
The presence of Latter-day Saints in Southern California developed during the 19th and 20th centuries through westward migration from earlier pioneer settlements. By the early 1990s, the church reported approximately 725,000 members in California. In response to this growth, plans for the San Diego California Temple were announced during general conference on April 7, 1984. The temple was intended to serve approximately 80,000 members residing in the Southern California – Baja California megaregion. It was the third temple built in California, following the Los Angeles (1956) and Oakland temples (1964).

Construction of the temple began with a groundbreaking ceremony held on February 27, 1988, with church president Ezra Taft Benson presiding. The ceremony took place in the University City area, the Golden Triangle neighborhood near La Jolla Village Square. Benson was joined by his second counselor, Thomas S. Monson, and other church general authorities.

By the time the temple opened for public tours in February 1993, Benson was unable to attend due to his declining health and apostle David B. Haight attended in his place. The public open house, held from February 20 to April 3, 1993, was preceded by two days of preview tours for members of the news media, community leaders, clergy, and other invited guests. It was the first time the designers had toured a Latter-day Saint temple. Approximately 720,000 visitors attended the open house, exceeding the estimated 600,000 visitors.

The temple was dedicated in 23 sessions from April 25 to April 30, 1993. At least two sessions were held in Spanish to accommodate members from northern Mexico. Hinckley conducted 13 of the sessions, and Monson conducted the other 10. The dedication sessions were attended by a total of 49,273 people.

Following nearly two decades of operation, the temple underwent exterior maintenance in 2010. The work included repairs to the roof, towers, and other exterior features, along with cleaning and preservation work to protect the structure from weathering. In 2020, like all the church's others, the temple was temporarily closed in response to the COVID-19 pandemic. Three years later, in April 2023, the church announced that the temple would close in July for an extensive renovation project.

== Design and architecture ==
The San Diego California Temple is on a seven-acre site in the La Jolla–Golden Triangle area of San Diego, adjacent to Interstate 5 and is described as a prominent landmark for travelers.

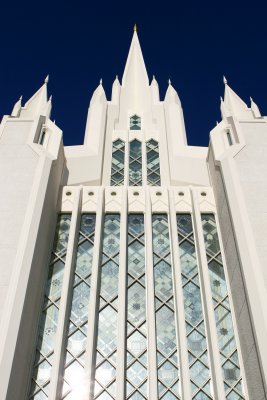
The stained glass wall of the West spire

The temple was designed by William S. Lewis, an architect and one of the church's bishops, working with a Roman Catholic couple, Dennis and Shelly Hyndman, who were responsible for the architectural and interior design work. As non-members of the church, the Hyndmans had not previously entered a Latter-day Saint temple. They relied on Lewis for guidance regarding temple requirements and later recalled being "really in the dark" until touring the interior of the Las Vegas Nevada Temple before its dedication, three years into the project. However, the principal design models for San Diego's construction were the Salt Lake and Washington D.C. temples. Design work began shortly after the church acquired the property in 1984, and the architects developed a custom design rather than following standardized temple plans. Early design concepts were later revised following review by church headquarters in Salt Lake City. According to Lewis, the designers also avoided architectural conventions commonly associated with Southern California, including stucco, tile, and arches.

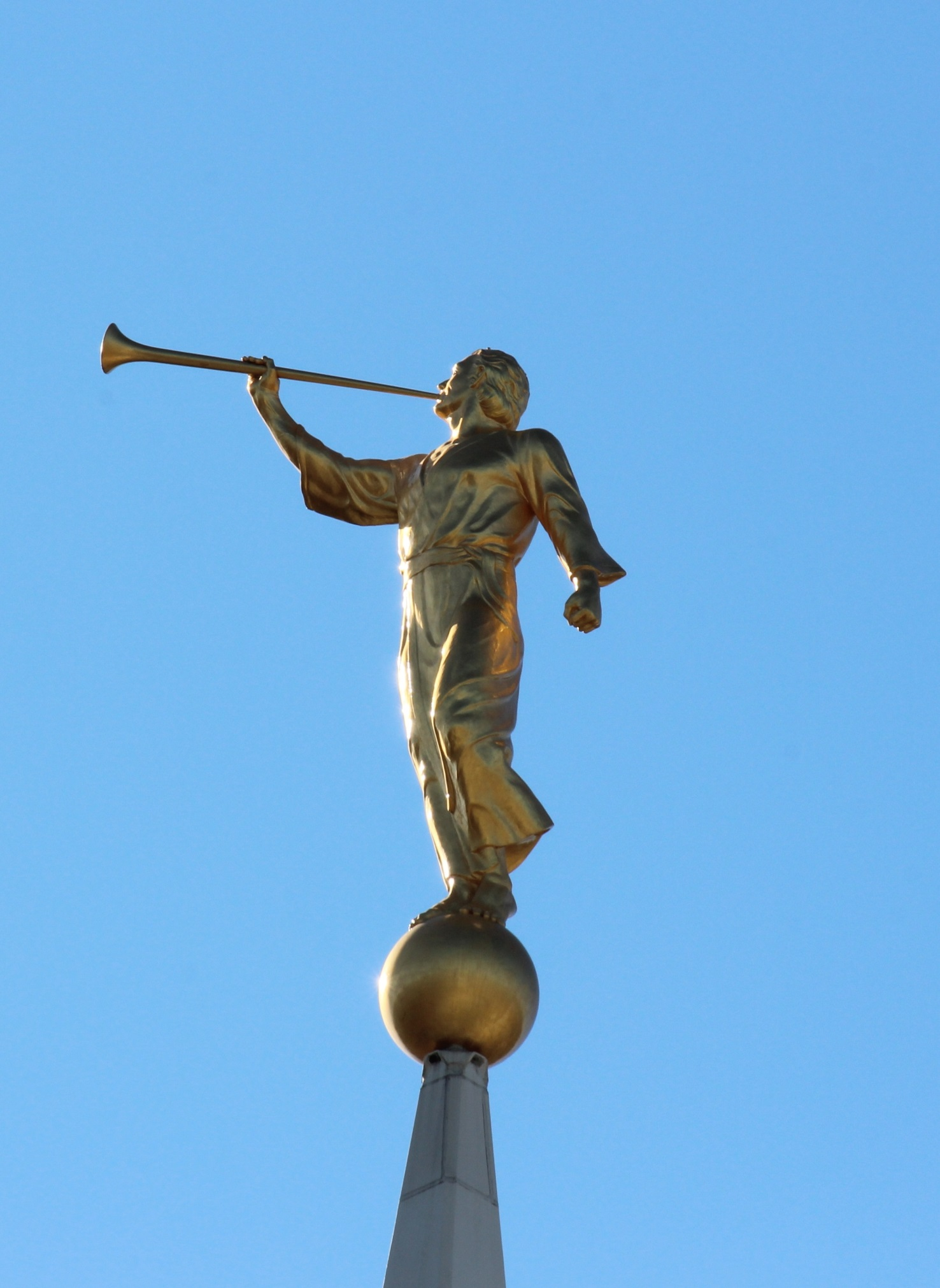
The Angel Moroni on the east spire

The temple is a Gothic-inspired structure with two principal spires, connected by a glass-enclosed, star-shaped atrium garden, and four smaller spires at their bases, for a total of ten spires. The spires rise to approximately 198 feet (60 m) and 203 feet (62 m), and the eastern spire is topped by a gold-leaf statue of the angel Moroni. The exterior is finished in white stone aggregate and plaster mixed with marble chips and incorporates vertical architectural elements, geometrically patterned leaded-glass windows, and etched glass in shades of green, white, and blue.

The temple contains approximately 59,000 square feet (5481 m^{2}) of interior space. Its interior includes a baptistry, four instruction rooms, six marriage sealing rooms (used to be eight), a celestial room, offices, and other facilities. The celestial room includes large art-glass windows, sofas, a staircase that leads to the balcony, and ceilings approximately 120 feet (37 m) high. The baptistry includes a font supported by twelve oxen sculptures, representing the Twelve tribes of Israel, and a painting on the wall depicting the baptism of Jesus. The building is arranged across four levels used for baptisms by proxy, instruction, and sealing ceremonies, with circulation provided by elevators, stairs, ramps, and a spiral staircase located within one of the towers.

A geometric motif, popularly referred to as the "Seal of Melchizedek" among church members, consisting of an eight-pointed star formed by two overlapping squares rotated 45 degrees, appears throughout the architecture. However, architect Lewis stated that the motif was selected for architectural reasons, while scholar Alonzo L. Gaskill found no evidence linking it to Melchizedek and interpreted it as a symbol of Christ.

Light is a recurring design element throughout the temple. Patterned leaded and art glass filter natural light into the interior, and the amount of light increases on the upper levels of the building.

=== Renovations ===
In July 2023, the temple was closed for extensive renovations. The renovation project included restoring and cleaning the marble-clad exterior, arresting freeway and marine staining, updating landscaping, upgrading interior finishes and bathrooms, repurposing the cafeteria and dining room into a worker break room and marriage waiting room, combining two sealing rooms into one larger room, and restoring all 144 original art-glass windows. As renovations neared completion, the church announced the public open house that was held from June 18 to July 11, 2026, excluding Sundays, followed by a rededication ceremony on August 23, 2026.

== Community impact ==
During its six-week public open house from February 20 to April 3, 1993, approximately 720,000 visitors toured the temple. The communications campaign associated with the open house received a Silver Anvil Award from the Public Relations Society of America for special events and observances by nonprofit organizations, and the temple was also named "Headliner of the Year" in the landmark category by the San Diego Press Club.

Former San Diego city architect Michael Stepner described the temple as a landmark along Interstate 5, noting that it helps distinguish San Diego from nearby communities, and called it "a big asset to San Diego".

== Temple presidents ==
The church's temples are directed by a temple president and matron, each typically serving for a term of three years. The president and matron oversee the administration of temple operations and provide guidance and training for both temple patrons and staff.

Those who have served as the temple president include J. Clifford Wallace (1998–1999), who was first, as well as emeritus general authorities Joe J. Christensen (1999–2002) and David E. Sorensen (2005–2008). In October 2025, the church announced that after rededication, Richard G. Whittier would be the president, with Stephanie L. Whittier as matron.

== Admittance ==
Prior to dedications, temples are open to the public only during its open house period. With renovations completed, it was open to the public from June 18 to July 11, 2026, except on Sundays. The rededication is scheduled for August 23, 2026.

Like all the church's temples, it is not used for Sunday worship services. To members of the church, temples are regarded as sacred houses of the Lord. Once dedicated, only church members with a current temple recommend can enter for worship.

== See also ==
Temples in California
Los Angeles Temples
Temples in the Los Angeles metropolitan
area
- = Operating
- = Under construction
- = Announced
- = Temporarily closed

- Comparison of temples (LDS Church)
- List of temples (LDS Church)
- List of temples by geographic region (LDS Church)
- Temple architecture (LDS Church)
- The Church of Jesus Christ of Latter-day Saints in California
