= La Jolla Beach & Tennis Club =

Social club in San Diego, California

Coordinates: 32.853129°N 117.258303°W

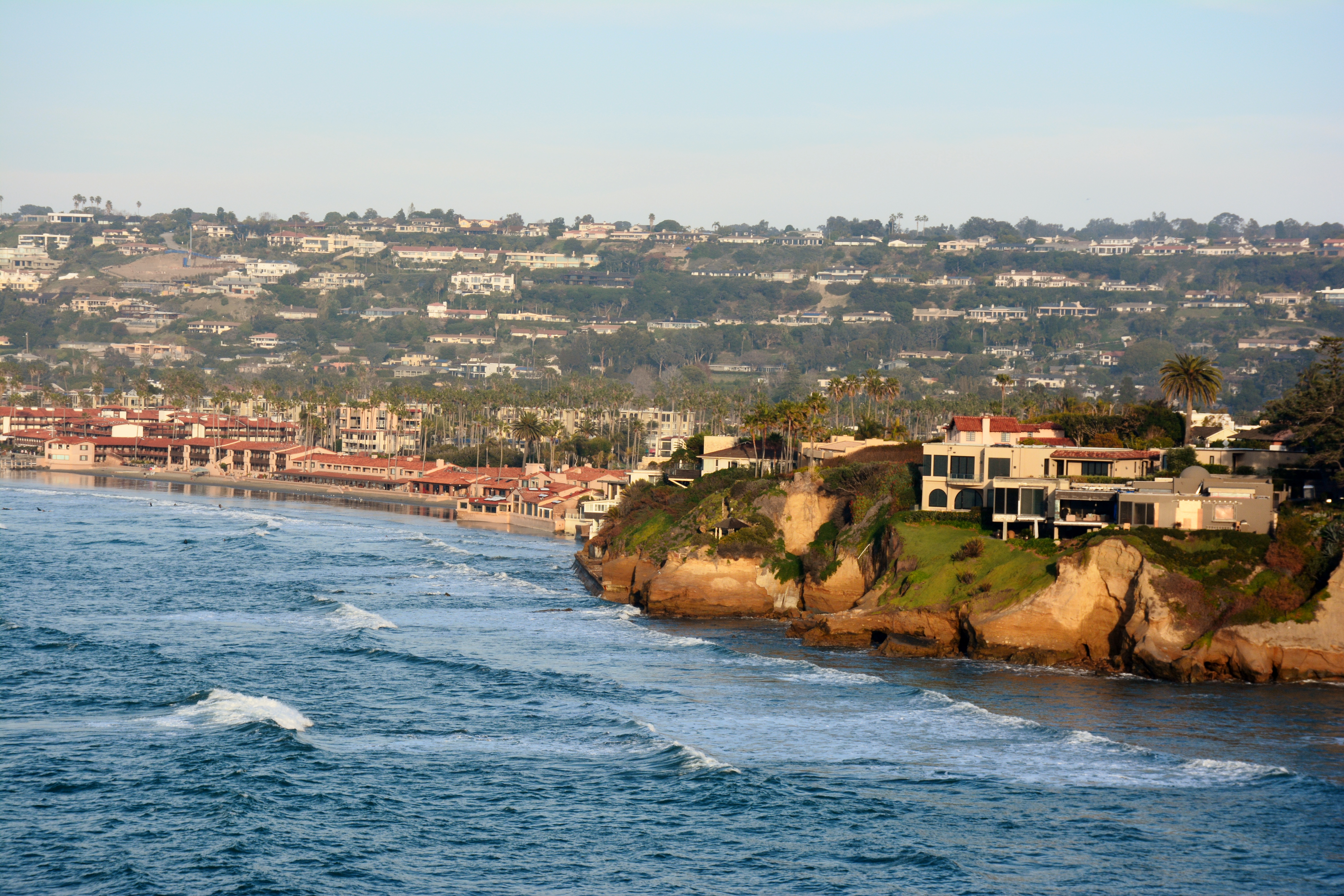
The La Jolla Beach & Tennis Club to the left

The La Jolla Beach & Tennis Club is a private social club and resort in La Jolla, a community in San Diego, California.

== History ==
The first foundation for the club began in 1927, when the area was designated for a private yacht club. The land was purchased in 1935 by newspaperman Frederick William Kellogg, who began developing the property into what it is today. As of 2024, the club is still owned by the Kellogg family.

== Overview ==
The 20-acre (81,000 m^{2}) property acts as both a private club and resort, and includes the La Jolla Shores Hotel, a 90 guest room facility open to the public. The property also includes a stretch of beach, a 9-hole pitch-and-putt golf course, and an outdoor, heated swimming pool. The La Jolla Shores Hotel offers dining at The Marine Room restaurant, which opened at the property in 1941.

The club hosted a first-round tie of the 2006 Davis Cup between the United States and Romania, and hosted a first round tie of the 2008 Fed Cup between the United States and Germany. In 2025, the club hosted the 136th Annual Pacific Coast Men's Doubles Tennis Championship.

In 2025, the club announced a $60 million renovation project.
