= Bird Rock, San Diego =

Coordinates: 32°48′40″N 117°16′0″W

Bird Rock is a seaside neighborhood within the larger community of La Jolla in San Diego, California. It lies on the Pacific Ocean at the southernmost end of La Jolla, just north of Pacific Beach. The mostly residential neighborhood includes homes for 1,400 to 1,500 families, with a commercial district along the main street, La Jolla Boulevard. The shore is rocky and has no beach, but offshore reefs are used for surfing.

== History ==
The neighborhood is named for an offshore rock that was described as having the shape of a bird and is often photographed with brown pelicans or other birds perching on it. The rock formerly included an arch with an opening under it, but the arch was eroded by wave action and collapsed in December 2010.

The neighborhood was subdivided by pioneer developer Michael Francis Hall in 1906. He named it Bird Rock City by the Sea.

During World War II, the area housed a unit of the United States Army Coast Artillery Corps called the Bird Rock Coastal Defense and Anti-Aircraft Training Center. The area was thinly-populated until a population explosion in the 1950s. Bird Rock Elementary School opened in 1951.

In 2005 the community installed a controversial series of roundabouts along La Jolla Boulevard and narrowed the street from four lanes to two, in an attempt to reduce traffic speed and discourage cut-through driving while encouraging visits to local businesses.

The area attracted attention in 2008 when local professional surfer Emery Kauanui died after an altercation with members of a local gang who called themselves the Bird Rock Bandits.

The Real World: San Diego was filmed in Bird Rock in 2011.

== Community associations ==
The La Jolla Community Planning Association advises the city on matters involving Bird Rock.

The Bird Rock Community Council is a local association aimed at maintaining and improving the quality of life in Bird Rock, maintaining a healthy business atmosphere along its main commercial street La Jolla Boulevard, and "honoring Bird Rock's history and preserving its unique identity within the community of La Jolla". It also maintains the Bird Rock Maintenance Assessment District.

== Nearby parkland ==
- Calumet Park
