= La Jolla Village, San Diego =

- Community of San Diego
- La Jolla Village
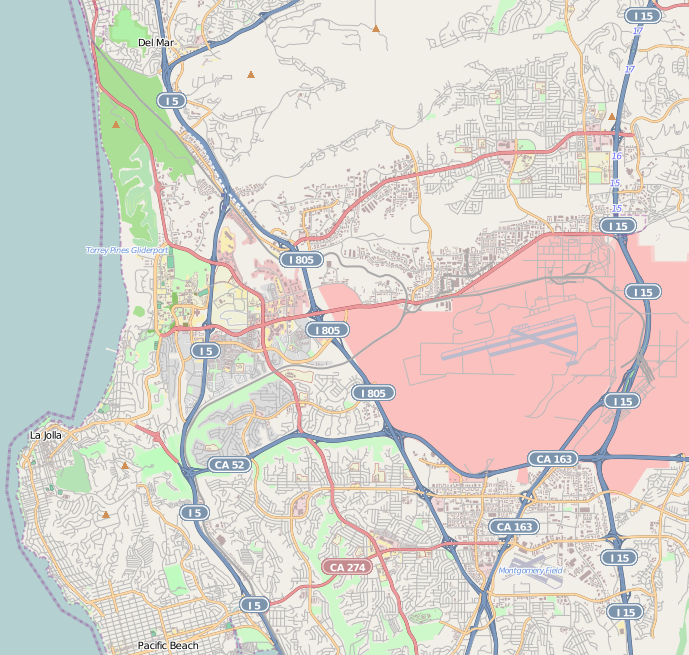
- Location within Northwestern San Diego
- Coordinates: 32°51′49″N 117°14′03″W
- Country: United States of America
- State: California
- County: San Diego
- City: San Diego

Area
  - Total: 0.638 sq mi (1.65 km^{2})

Population
  - Total: 5,783
  - Density: 9,060/sq mi (3,500/km^{2})
- ZIP Code: 92037
- Area code: 858

La Jolla Village is a mixed residential/business neighborhood in the community of La Jolla in San Diego, California. La Jolla Village Square and The Shops at La Jolla Village are in the center of the neighborhood and contain a variety of stores, restaurants, apartments, a post office and two movie theaters.

== Geography ==
La Jolla Village is bordered by I-5 and University City to the east; Gilman Drive and La Jolla Heights to the west and south and La Jolla Village Drive, UC San Diego, and Torrey Pines to the north.

== Demographics ==
As of the Census of 2010, there were 5,783 people living in 3,283 households in La Jolla Village. The population density was 9,064 people per square mile. The racial makeup of La Jolla Village was 69.03% White, 22.10% Asian, 1.68% African American, 0.07% American Indian and Alaska Native, 0.03% Native Hawaiian and Pacific Islander, 2.80% from other races and 4.29% from two or more races. Hispanic or Latino of any race were 9.99%.

== Education ==
La Jolla Village is served by Torrey Pines Elementary School (K-5) in La Jolla Heights, Muirlands Middle School (6-8) in the Muirlands, La Jolla High School (9-12) in the Beach-Barber Tract and University City High School (9-12) in University City.

The neighborhood is also adjacent to the University of California, San Diego campus.

== Transportation ==
La Jolla Village is served by the I-5 and SR-52 freeways, several MTS bus routes and the Rose Canyon Bike Path. A Mid-Coast Trolley station is located on Nobel Drive on the west side of I-5.

== Recreation ==
- Rose Canyon Open Space Park
- Villa La Jolla Park
