= UC San Diego Central Campus station =

San Diego Trolley station

UC San Diego Central Campus
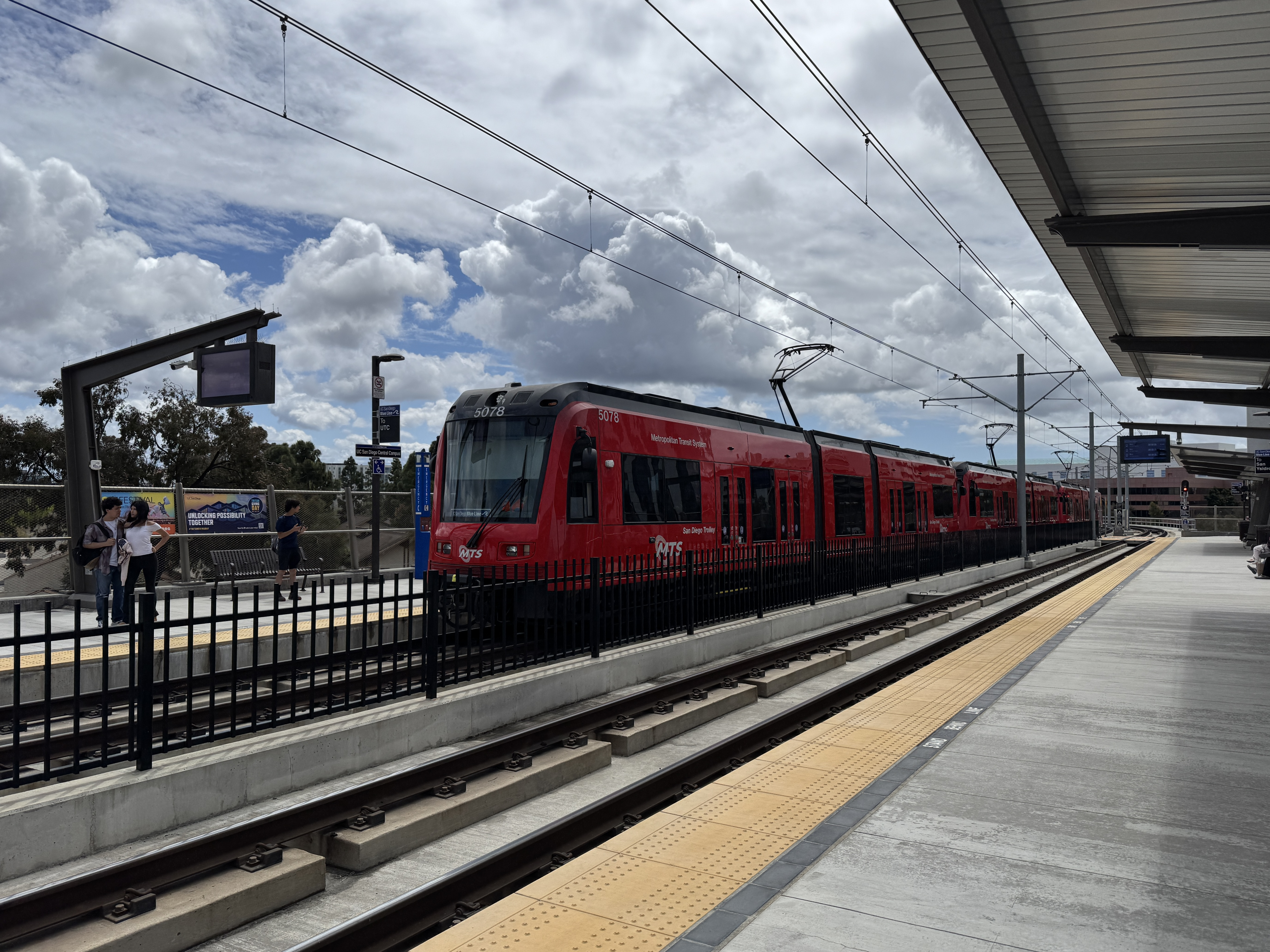
- UC San Diego Central Campus station platform

General information
- Location: 9482 Innovation Lane; San Diego, California; United States
- Coordinates: 32°52′42″N 117°13′55″W
- Owner: San Diego Metropolitan Transit System
- Operator: San Diego Trolley
- Platforms: 2 side platforms
- Tracks: 2
- Connections: MTS: 985; UC San Diego Triton Transit: Inside Loop, Outside Loop, Regents Express

Construction
- Structure type: Elevated
- Cycle facilities: 8 lockers
- Accessible: Disabled access

Other information
- Station code: 77781, 77782

History
- Opened: November 21, 2021
- Former names: UCSD West/Pepper Canyon

Services
Preceding station	San Diego Trolley	Following station
UC San Diego Health La Jolla toward UTC	Blue Line	VA Medical Center toward San Ysidro
Location

UC San Diego Central Campus station is a San Diego Trolley station located on the UC San Diego campus. The elevated station is located within the Pepper Canyon Living & Learning Neighborhood, with dormitories to the west and east. The station opened on November 21, 2021, as a new station on the Blue Line, constructed as part of the Mid-Coast Trolley extension project.

== Nearby destinations ==
The station is within walking distance of the following notable places:

- University of California, San Diego (UCSD)
- San Diego VA Medical Center (also served by VA Medical Center station)

== Connections ==
The station is served by the following UCSD Triton Transit bus routes:

- R – Regents Express
- IL – Inside Loop
- OL – Outside Loop

The station is also served by one MTS bus route:

- 985 – Loop to Torrey Pines / UCSD Central Campus

== Gallery ==
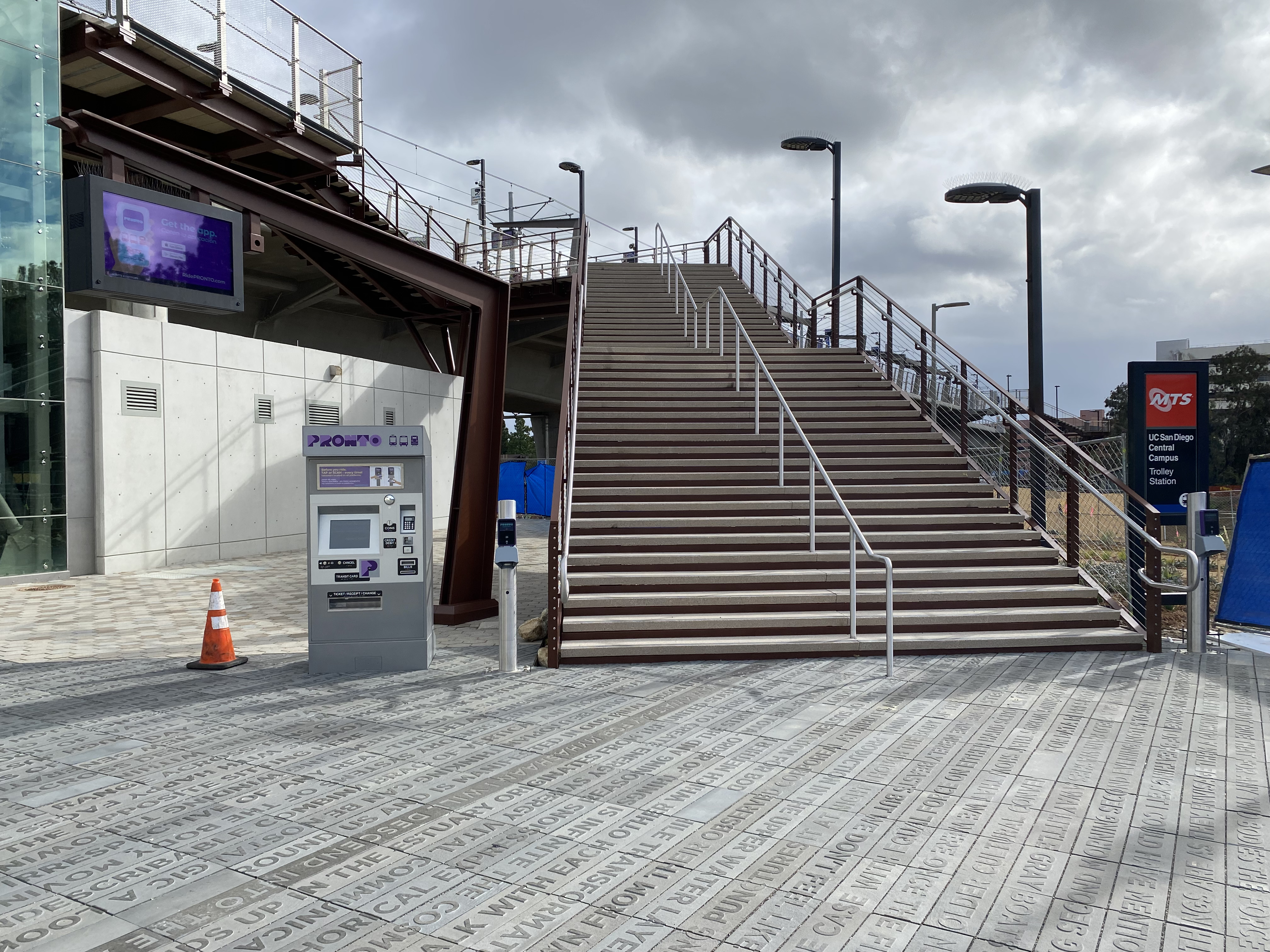
Station Entrance

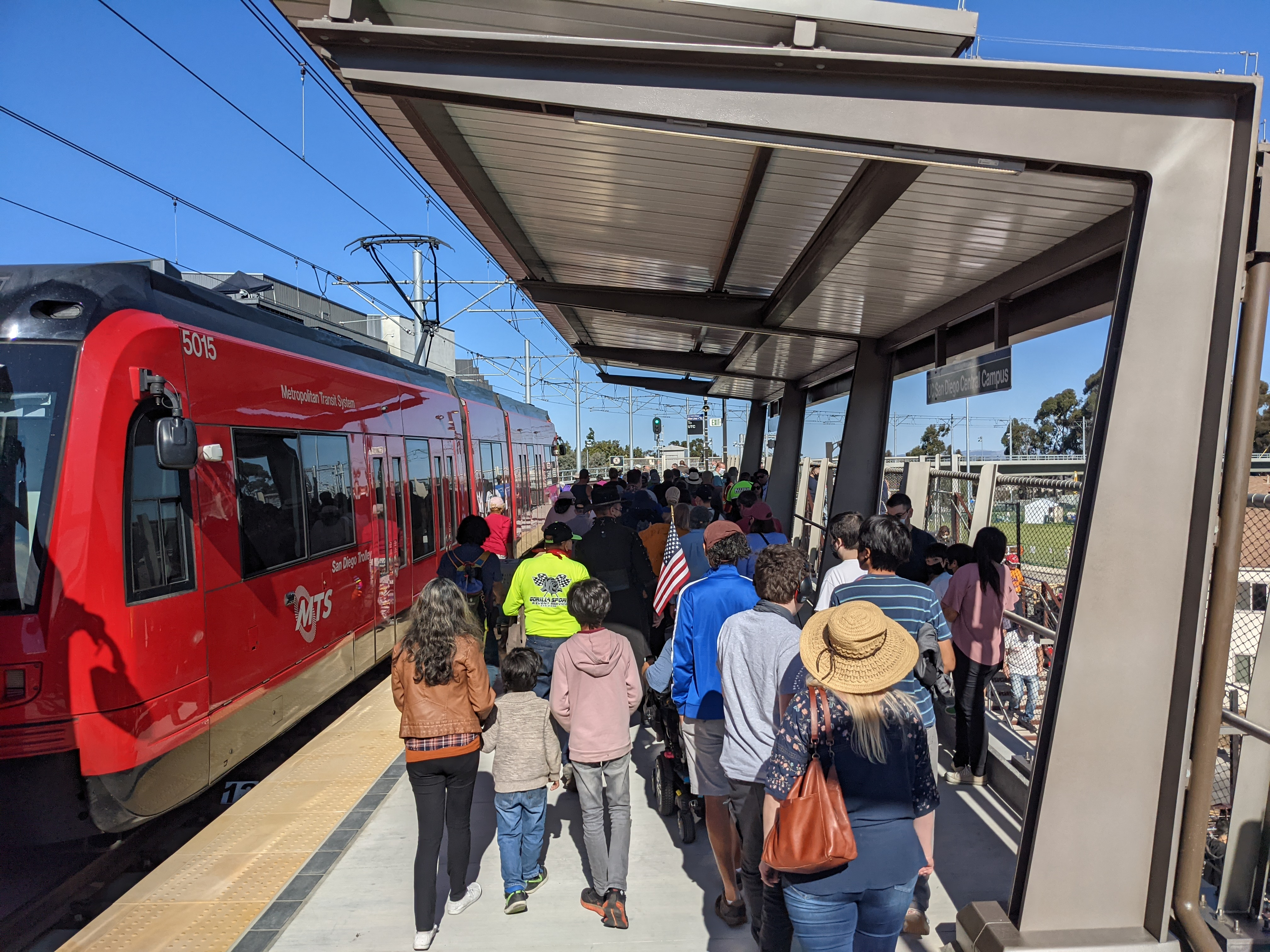
Platform on opening day in November 2021

Trolley arriving at station in February 2025
