= Nobel Drive station =

San Diego Trolley station

Nobel Drive
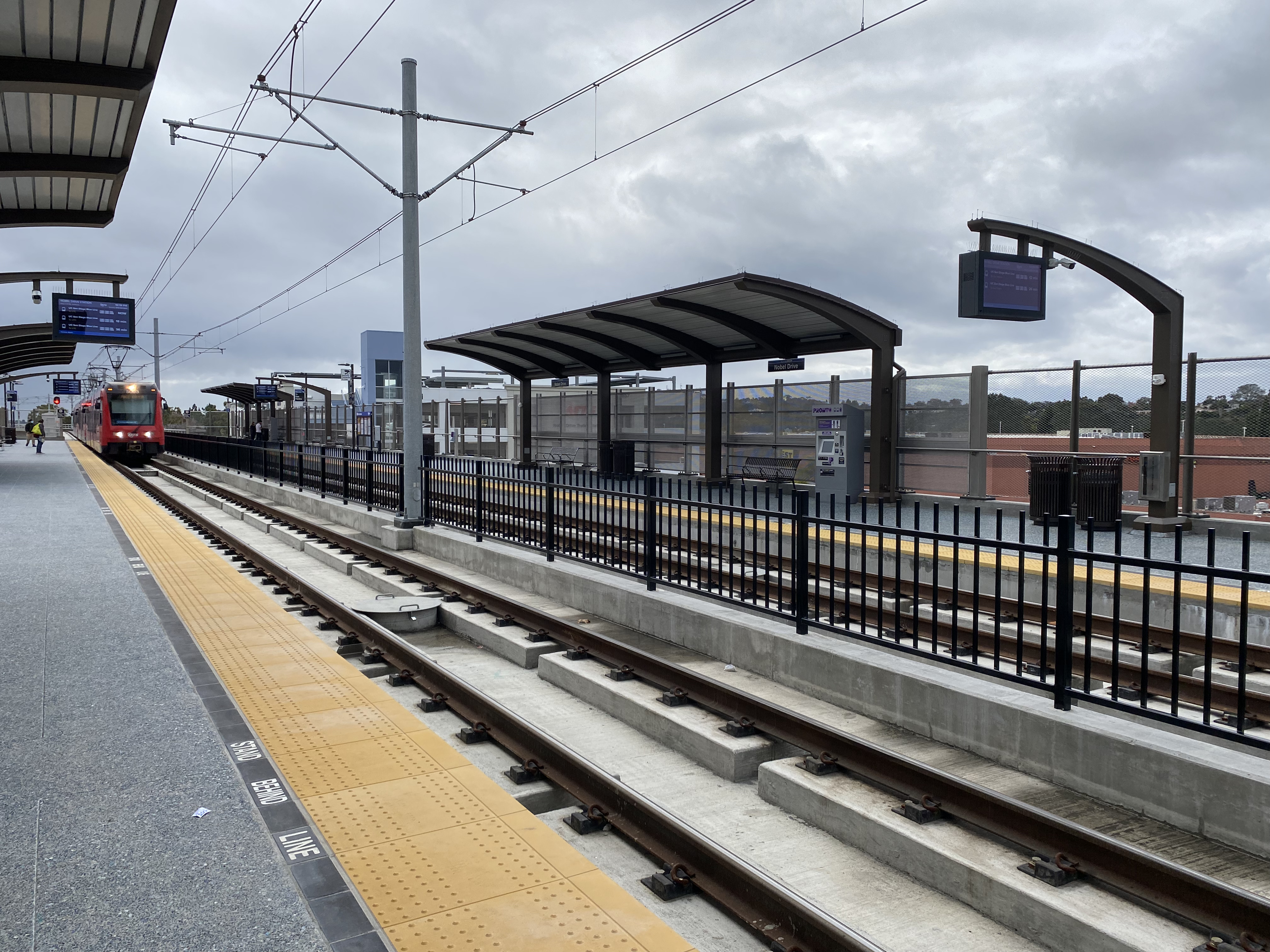
- Nobel Drive station platform

General information
- Location: 3449 Nobel Drive; San Diego, California; United States
- Coordinates: 32°52′00″N 117°13′49″W
- Owner: San Diego Metropolitan Transit System
- Operator: San Diego Trolley
- Platforms: 2 side platforms
- Tracks: 2
- Connections: MTS: 30, Rapid 201, Rapid 202; NCTD BREEZE: 101

Construction
- Structure type: Elevated
- Parking: 289 spaces
- Cycle facilities: Racks and 40 space parking station
- Accessible: Disabled access

Other information
- Station code: 77776, 77778

History
- Opened: November 21, 2021

Services
Preceding station	San Diego Trolley	Following station
VA Medical Center toward UTC	Blue Line	Balboa Avenue toward San Ysidro
Location

Nobel Drive station is a San Diego Trolley station located at the western side of the La Jolla Village Square shopping center in the La Jolla Village district of San Diego, California. The station is accessible from the shopping center's northern entrance at Nobel Drive. Service began on November 21, 2021, after the completion of the Blue Line Mid-Coast Trolley extension project.

Bus service connecting to the station include MTS routes 30, Rapid 201, and Rapid 202; and NCTD BREEZE route 101.
