= VA Medical Center station (San Diego) =

San Diego Trolley station

VA Medical Center
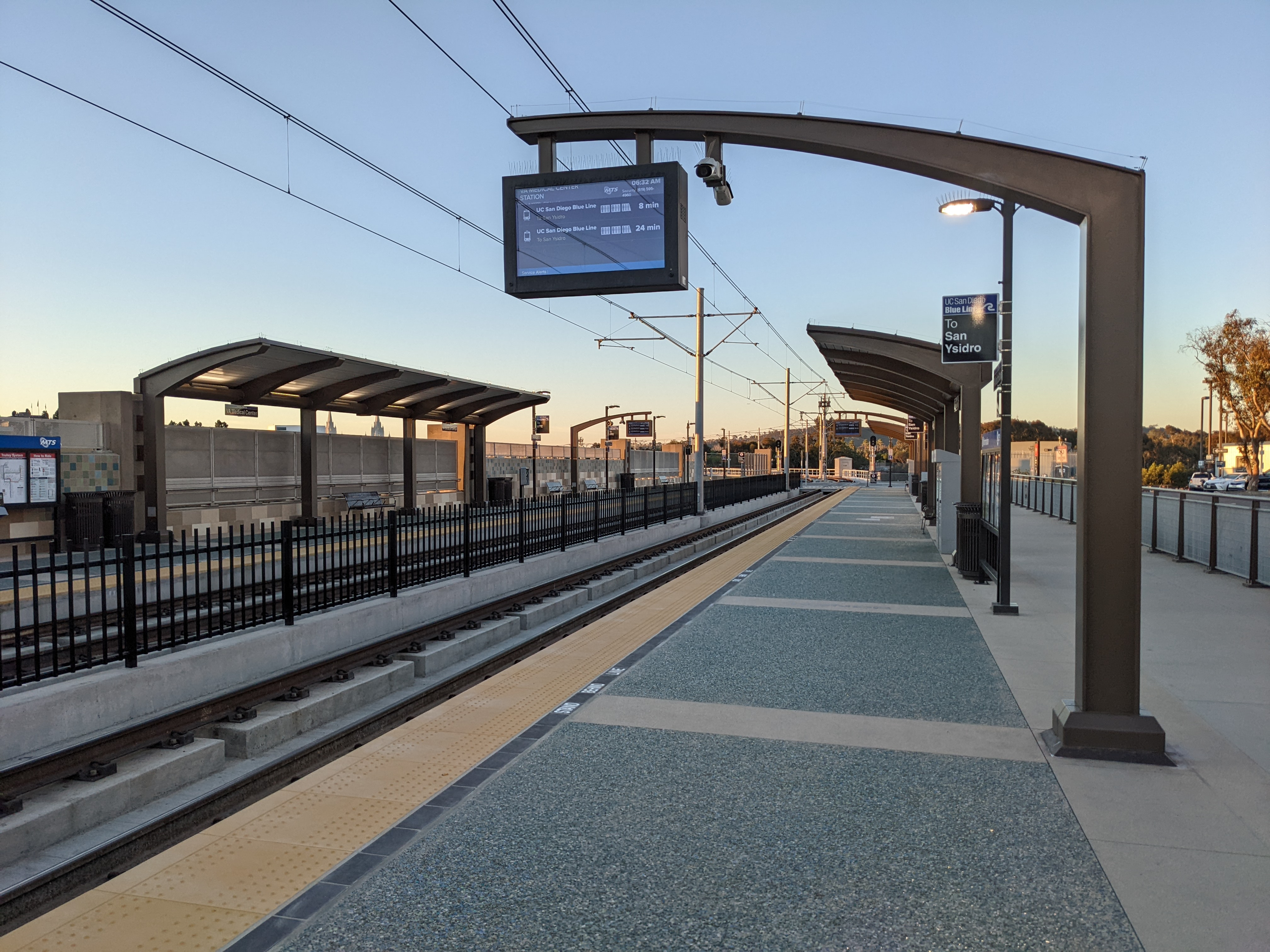
- VA Medical Center station platform

General information
- Location: 3380 La Jolla Village Drive; San Diego, California; United States
- Coordinates: 32°52′09″N 117°12′50″W
- Owner: San Diego Metropolitan Transit System
- Operator: San Diego Trolley
- Platforms: 2 side platforms
- Tracks: 2

Construction
- Structure type: Elevated
- Cycle facilities: 8 lockers
- Accessible: Disabled access

Other information
- Station code: 77779, 77780

History
- Opened: November 21, 2021

Services
Preceding station	San Diego Trolley	Following station
UC San Diego Central Campus toward UTC	Blue Line	Nobel Drive toward San Ysidro
Location

VA Medical Center station is a San Diego Trolley station in San Diego, California, elevated and adjacent to the Jennifer Moreno Department of Veterans Affairs Medical Center, a Veterans Affairs hospital next to UC San Diego. Service began on November 21, 2021 after the completion of the Blue Line Mid-Coast Trolley extension project.
