= David E. Sorensen =

American businessman and LDS Church leader

Second Quorum of the Seventy
- June 6, 1992 – April 1, 1995
- Called by: Ezra Taft Benson
- End reason: Transferred to the First Quorum of the Seventy

First Quorum of the Seventy
- April 1, 1995 – October 1, 2005
- Called by: Gordon B. Hinckley
- End reason: Granted general authority emeritus status

Presidency of the Seventy
- August 15, 1998 – August 15, 2005
- Called by: Gordon B. Hinckley
- End reason: Honorably released

Emeritus General Authority
- October 1, 2005 – August 26, 2014
- Called by: Gordon B. Hinckley

Personal details
- Born: David Eugene Sorensen; June 29, 1933; Aurora, Utah, United States
- Died: August 26, 2014 (aged 81); San Juan Capistrano, California, United States

David Eugene Sorensen (June 29, 1933 – August 26, 2014) was a general authority of the Church of Jesus Christ of Latter-day Saints (LDS Church) from 1992 until his death. He served in the First and Second Quorums of the Seventy and as a member of the Presidency of the Seventy. He was the executive director of the church's Temple Department during the temple building boom of the late 1990s and early 2000s.

Sorensen was born in Aurora, Utah. He grew up working on the family ranch. As a young man he served as a missionary in the Central Atlantic States Mission (centered on Virginia, West Virginia and North Carolina, Washington DC and probably some adjacent parts of Virginia were then in the Eastern States Mission headquartered in New York City) from 1954-1956. After his mission, he served for two years in the United States military. He married Verla Anderson in 1958 and they had seven children. He studied at Brigham Young University, the University of Utah and Utah State University but went to work full time to overcome debt associated with the family ranch before receiving a degree.

Sorensen spent his career as a business owner, operating a healthcare services company while living in California. He previously served in the LDS Church as a bishop, stake president, and as president of the Canada Halifax Mission. He also served as vice chair of the Nevada Community Bank in Las Vegas, Nevada.

Sorensen was called as a general authority and member of the Second Quorum of the Seventy in June 1992. He was transferred to the First Quorum of the Seventy in April 1995. Sorensen's assignments as a general authority included service as Executive Director of the church's Temple Department. He oversaw development of the new standardized temples announced by Gordon B. Hinckley in October 1997 and the associated construction program that saw the number of temples more than double from 1998 to 2000.

Sorensen also served as president of the church's North America West and Asia North areas as well as serving as a counselor in other area presidencies. From 1998 to 2005, Sorensen was a member of the seven-man Presidency of the Seventy.

After being designated as an emeritus general authority in 2005, Sorensen served as president of the church's San Diego California Temple from 2005 to 2008.

Sorensen died at his home in San Juan Capistrano, California.
