= La Jolla Village Square =

Shopping center in San Diego, California

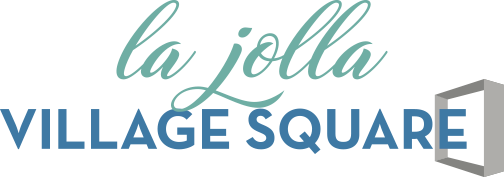

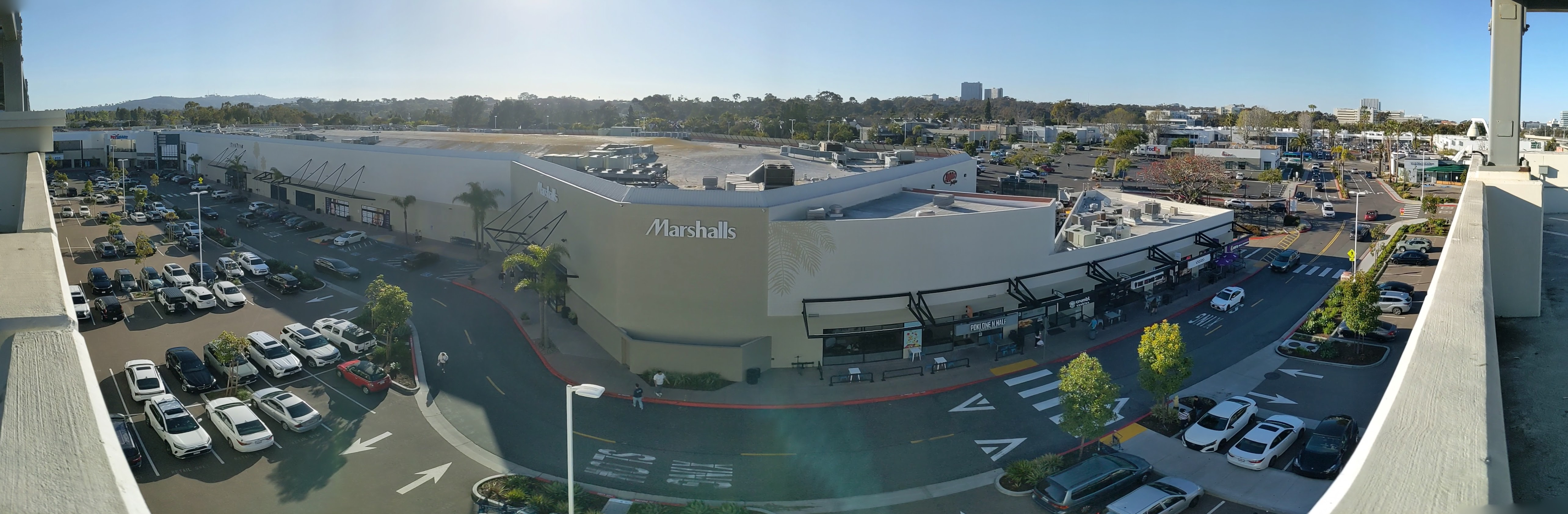
- View from Nobel Drive station
- Location: La Jolla Village, San Diego, California, US
- Coordinates: 32.8657°N 117.232°W
- Address: 8657 Villa La Jolla Drive, La Jolla, CA 92037
- Opened: 1993; 33 years ago
- Developer: May Centers; Power center: Gordon Beck Ventures
- Num. of stores: 30
- Num. of anchor tenants: 3
- Floors: 2
- Public transit: Nobel Drive station
- Website: ljvillagesquare.com

La Jolla Village Square (formerly La Jolla Village) is a retail power center with a collection of mostly big box retailers. Before 1992, was an enclosed upscale regional mall with department store anchors and an adjacent "convenience center" (or strip mall) portion. It is located in the La Jolla Village neighborhood of San Diego just south of UC San Diego and about one mile west of Westfield UTC, with which it used to compete as an upscale regional mall. It is across the street from "The Shops at La Jolla Village", whose tenants include Whole Foods Market, Nordstrom Rack, and CVS Pharmacy.

== History ==
Opened in 1979, original anchors were Bullocks Wilshire (later rebranded as I. Magnin) and May Company California. In 1988 when May Department Stores almost sold the mall to T&S Development Inc., it had 48 stores and 362,420 square feet of retail space, but the deal fell apart at the last minute. Four years later, May Centers was finally able to sell La Jolla Village Mall to Gordon/Beck Ventures in 1992 after a number of years of trying to locate a buyer for this particular property.

The San Diego Reader called the mall in 1982 the city's "'carriage-trade' center" and noted that the pace seemed "genteel":

while I’ve never heard anyone say UTC reminds them of Europe, people do say that of La Jolla Village Mall. It is elegant on the outside, with large gray concrete buttress columns standing out from the tan brick; and high-tech inside, with bright enamel-green rafters and narrow blue conduits in bold relief against the angled skylight panels. The sumptuous six-foot-high Christmas figures, the baby grand piano at the foot of the escalators, and the classical Muzak seem to beckon not to the masses…

— Amy Chu, San Diego Reader 1982

A 1992 plan led to the closure of the department stores (I. Magnin closed in 1993) and repurposed the property as a power center anchored by general and discount retailers, rather than upscale ones, including Whole Foods Market and Sav-on Drugs (became CVS in 2006).
