= Magnin =

Magnin is a surname. Notable people with the surname include:

- Albert Magnin (1846–1906), American politician
- Antoine Magnin (1848–1926), French botanist
- Charles Magnin (1793–1862), French writer
- Cyril Magnin (1899–1988), American businessman
- Edgar Magnin (1890–1984), American Reform rabbi
- Eduardo Magnin (born 1969), Argentine footballer
- Gérard Magnin (born 1951), French businessman
- Isaac Magnin (1842–1907), American carver and gilder; co-founder of I. Magnin, an upscale women's clothing store in San Francisco, California.
- Ludovic Magnin (born 1979), Swiss footballer
- Mae Magnin Brussell (1922–1988), American radio personality.
- Mary Ann Magnin (1850–1943), co-founder of I. Magnin, an upscale women's clothing store in San Francisco, California.

== See also ==
- I. Magnin, department store in San Francisco, California
- Joseph Magnin Co., department store in San Francisco, California
- Musée Magnin, museum in Dijon, France
