= Cyril Magnin =

American businessman (1899–1988)

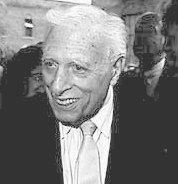
- Magnin in 1985
- Born: Cyril Isaac Magnin; July 6, 1899; San Francisco, California, United States
- Died: June 9, 1988 (aged 88)
- Education: University of California, Berkeley
- Occupations: Business executive, philanthropist
- Spouse(s): Anna (Smithline) Magnin; Lillian (Ryan Helwig) Magnin
- Children: 3
- Relatives: Isaac Magnin (paternal grandfather); Mary Ann Magnin (paternal grandmother); Edgar Magnin (cousin); Mae Magnin Brussell (niece)

Cyril Isaac Magnin (July 6, 1899 – June 9, 1988) was an American businessman from San Francisco, California. He was the chief executive of the Joseph Magnin Co.

== Early life ==
Cyril Isaac Magnin was born to a Jewish family on July 6, 1899. His father, Joseph Magnin, was the founder of specialty department store Joseph Magnin Co. His mother was Charlotte (Davis) Magnin. His paternal grandfather, Isaac Magnin, was a Dutch-born frame carver and gilder. His paternal grandmother, Mary Ann Magnin, was the founder of I. Magnin, an upscale women's clothing store in San Francisco. His cousin, Edgar Magnin, was the rabbi of the Wilshire Boulevard Temple, a Reform Jewish congregation. He was educated at Lowell High School. He then graduated from the University of California, Berkeley, where he went on to receive a law degree.

== Career ==
He served as the president of Joseph Magnin Co. from 1940 to 1952. He then served as its chairman and chief executive officer from 1952 to 1970. It evolved into a multimillion-dollar chain, selling fashion for young women. He served as general partner and chairman of Cyril Magnin Investments Ltd. as well as chairman of Lilli Ann Corp. He also served as president of the San Francisco Chamber of Commerce.

== Philanthropy ==
He was president of the Port of San Francisco and was instrumental in establishing such internationally renowned institutions as the Asian Art Museum, the American Conservatory Theater and the California Culinary Academy, serving as head of the California Museums Foundation. He served on the board of directors of the San Francisco Film Festival. Additionally, he served as the head of the National Conference of Christians and Jews for two terms. He was also a fundraiser for the March of Dimes and the American Cancer Society. He served as the "Chief of Protocol" for the City of San Francisco from 1964 to 1988. As a result, he was nicknamed "Mr. San Francisco" by columnist Herb Caen. He appeared in the films Foul Play, as Pope Pius XIII, and Maxie, as Mr. San Francisco. He published his autobiography, Call Me Cyril, in 1981. He was awarded the UCSF medal in 1977.

== Political advocacy ==
Magnin was a veteran political fund-raiser and power broker in the Democratic Party. He was treasurer of President Franklin D. Roosevelt's northern California re-election campaign in 1944, a delegate to the Democratic National Convention in 1948 (which nominated President Harry S. Truman) and again in 1964, when he co-chaired the Finance Committee of President Lyndon B. Johnson's campaign in California.

Throughout the 1950s and 1960s, Magnin was one of a quartet of wealthy San Francisco Jewish contributors to Democratic candidates, appreciatively called "The Green Machine" by career politicians, the others being the Fairmont Hotel magnate Benjamin Swig, Lilli Ann clothing company founder Adolph Schuman, and real estate mogul Walter Shorenstein. The four did not always agree in their choice of candidates. Magnin himself was a major donor to the presidential candidacies of John F. Kennedy in 1960 and Robert F. Kennedy in 1968, and, in the interim, developed a close friendship with Lyndon Johnson.

== Personal life and death ==
He was married to Anna (Smithline) Magnin, who died in 1948. They had two sons and a daughter: Donald I. Magnin, Jerry A. Magnin and Ellen Magnin Newman. He remarried to Lillian Ryan Helwig in 1951, only to divorce a decade later, in 1961. He identified as a non-practicing Jew. He died on June 9, 1988. The two-block stretch of Fifth Street North, north of Market and adjacent to Hallidie Plaza, was renamed Cyril Magnin Street in his honor during his lifetime.
