= History of retail in Palm Springs, California =

This article covers the history of department stores and retail in Palm Springs, California, particularly in that city's downtown.

== Palm Springs Plaza ==
Palm Springs Plaza, as it was then called, now La Plaza, opened November 1, 1936, one of the first shopping centers in Southern California with a single developer, owner and a uniform appearance, after Westwood Village (1929). It contained a parking garage on three levels with parking for 141 cars, the largest garage in Riverside County. Desmond's (department store) was an original anchor and continued to operate until 2005.

== Resort stores ==
Bullock's, a large upscale department store on Broadway in Los Angeles, opened a Spanish Colonial-style "resort store" in the Desert Inn complex in 1930. I. Magnin followed, opening a resort store in the El Mirador resort on December 1, 1933, closing when that resort was turned into a military hospital in 1942. When Bullock's opened a full department store at 151 Palm Canyon Drive in 1947, J. W. Robinson's, another large L.A. store, took the former Bullock's location and opened its own resort store there.

== Full-line and specialty department stores ==
After La Plaza was built, additional junior and full-line department stores started to be established on Palm Canyon Drive immediately adjacent to La Plaza. Bullock's/Bullocks Wilshire (#151, 1947–1990), J. W. Robinson's (#333, 1958–1987), and Saks Fifth Avenue (opened October 16, 1959 at No. 490), forming a large shopping district. In 1967 the Desert Fashion Plaza mall was built, I. Magnin opened there (closed 1992) and Saks closed its previous location and moved into a new larger store in the mall. Joseph Magnin Co. opened a 26,000 square foot department store in the mall in 1969, meaning that together with a Sears at 611 Palm Canyon Dr., for two decades, downtown boasted seven department stores, plus the Palm Springs Mall 1.5 miles to the east operating from 1959 to 2005.
