= La Plaza (Palm Springs) =

Shopping center in Palm Springs, California, United States

Coordinates: 33.821953°N 116.545959°W

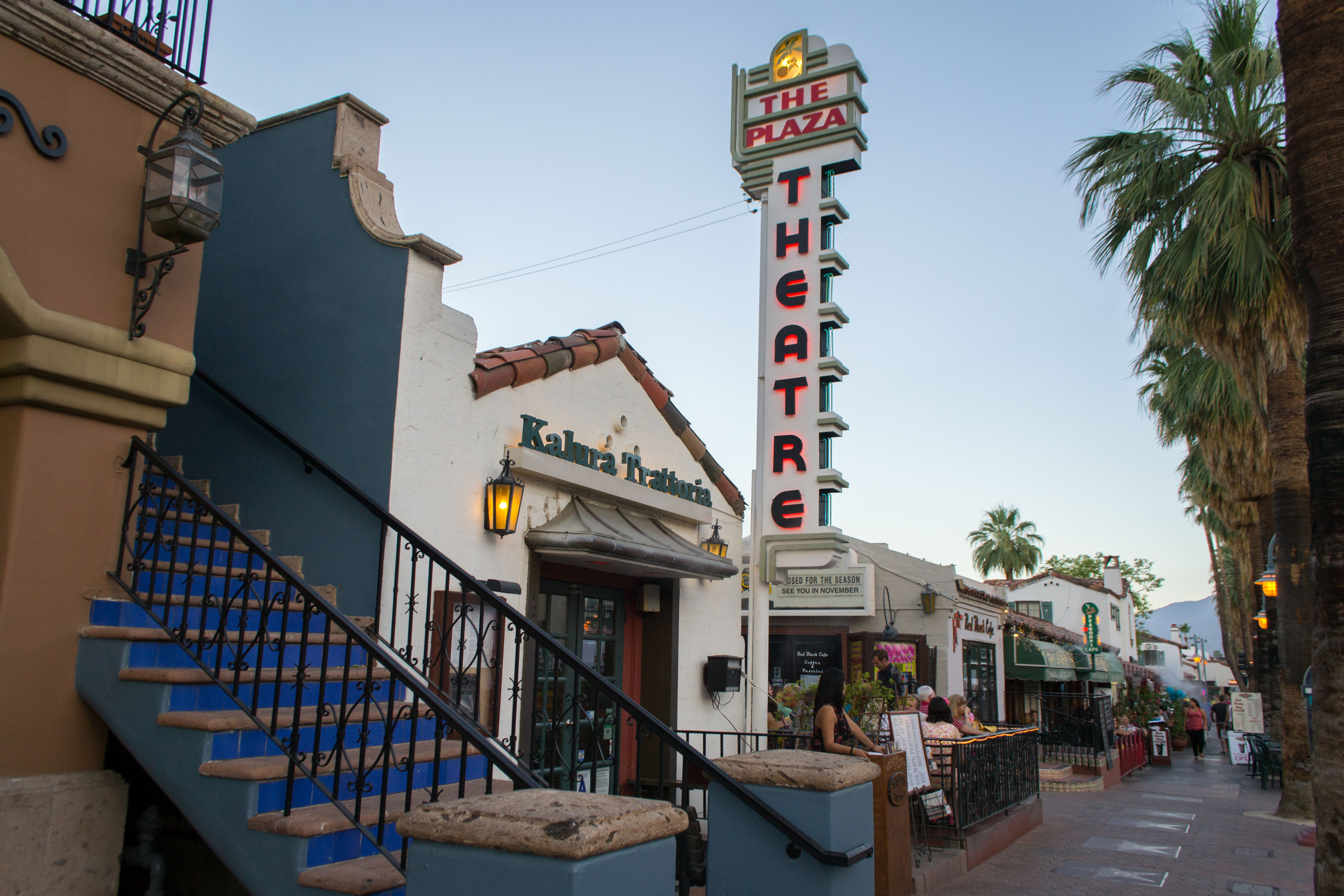
View along west side of La Plaza (S. Palm Canyon Dr.)

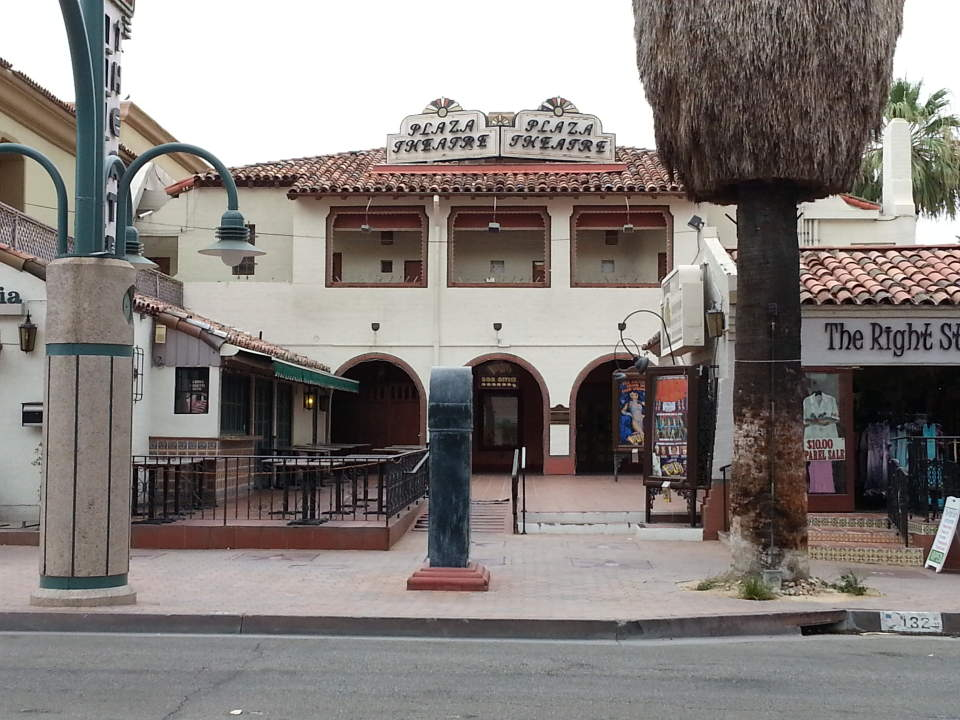
Plaza theater seen in 2012

La Plaza, originally Palm Springs Plaza and also known as La Plaza de California, is an on-street, open-air shopping center at the heart of downtown Palm Springs, California. It is located between the main southbound artery through downtown, South Palm Canyon Drive, and the northbound artery, Indian Canyon Drive, along a divided road called La Plaza, with storefronts on all of those streets as well as on the north backside (Tahquitz Canyon) and south backside (Arenas). The historic Plaza Theatre is an anchor.

== History ==
Palm Springs Plaza, as it was then called, opened November 1, 1936, one of the first shopping centers in Southern California with a single developer, owner and a uniform appearance, after Westwood Village (1929). It contained a parking garage on three levels with parking for 141 cars, the largest garage in Riverside County. Desmond's (department store) was an original anchor and continued to operate until 2005.

=== Downtown Palm Springs shopping district ===
==== Resort stores ====
Bullock's, a large upscale department store on Broadway in Los Angeles, opened a Spanish Colonial-style "resort store" in the Desert Inn complex in 1930. I. Magnin followed, opening a resort store in the El Mirador Hotel on December 1, 1933, closing when that resort was turned into a military hospital in 1942. When Bullock's opened a full department store at 151 Palm Canyon Drive in 1947, J. W. Robinson's, another large L.A. store, took the former Bullock's location and opened its own resort store there.

==== Full department stores ====
After La Plaza was built, additional junior and full-line department stores started to be established on Palm Canyon Drive immediately adjacent to La Plaza. Bullock's/Bullocks Wilshire (#151, 1947–1990), J. W. Robinson's (#333, 1958–1987), and Saks Fifth Avenue (opened October 16, 1959 at #490), forming a large shopping district. In 1967 the Desert Fashion Plaza mall was built, I. Magnin opened there (closed 1992) and Saks closed its previous location and moved into a new larger store in the mall. Joseph Magnin Co. opened a 26,000 sq ft (2,400 m^{2}) department store in the mall in 1969, meaning that together with a Sears at 611 Palm Canyon Dr., for two decades, downtown boasted seven department stores, plus the Palm Springs Mall 1.5 mi (2.4 km) to the east operating from 1959 through 2005.
