= Slessinger =

Slessinger is a surname. Notable people with the surname include:

- Mark Slessinger (born 1974), basketball head coach at the University of New Orleans
- May Slessinger (1872–1954), American artist specializing in miniatures
- Tess Slessinger (1905–1945), American writer and screenwriter
