= Hills of Eternity Memorial Park =

Jewish cemetery in Colma, California

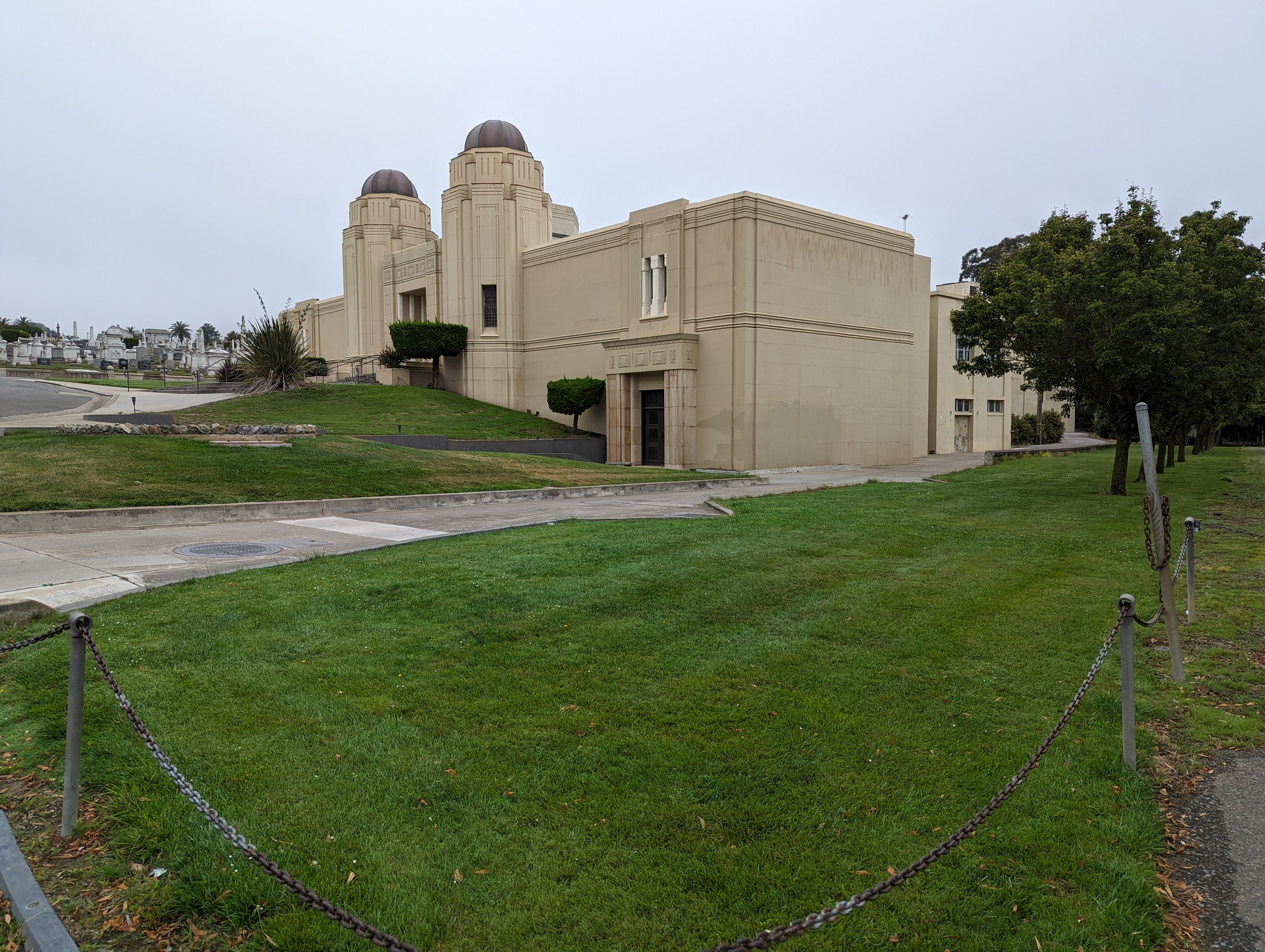
- Portals of Eternity mausoleum and chapel at Hills of Eternity, designed by Samuel Hyman and Abraham Appleton (completed 1934)

Details
- Established: 1889; 136 years ago
- Location: Colma, California
- Country: United States
- Coordinates: 37°40′35″N 122°27′14″W
- Type: Jewish
- Owned by: Congregation Sherith Israel
- Website: Official website
- Find a Grave: Hills of Eternity Memorial Park

Hills of Eternity Memorial Park, also known as Giboth Olam, is a Jewish cemetery founded in 1889, and is located at 1301 El Camino Real, in Colma, California. This cemetery is owned by Congregation Sherith Israel of San Francisco. It is one of four Jewish cemeteries near the city of San Francisco and it shares an adjacent space next to the Home of Peace cemetery (also a Jewish cemetery, and also founded in 1889). At Hills of Eternity Memorial Park, Jewish burials are traditionally done side-by-side, which means there is a need for larger grounds and ground maintenance.

== History ==
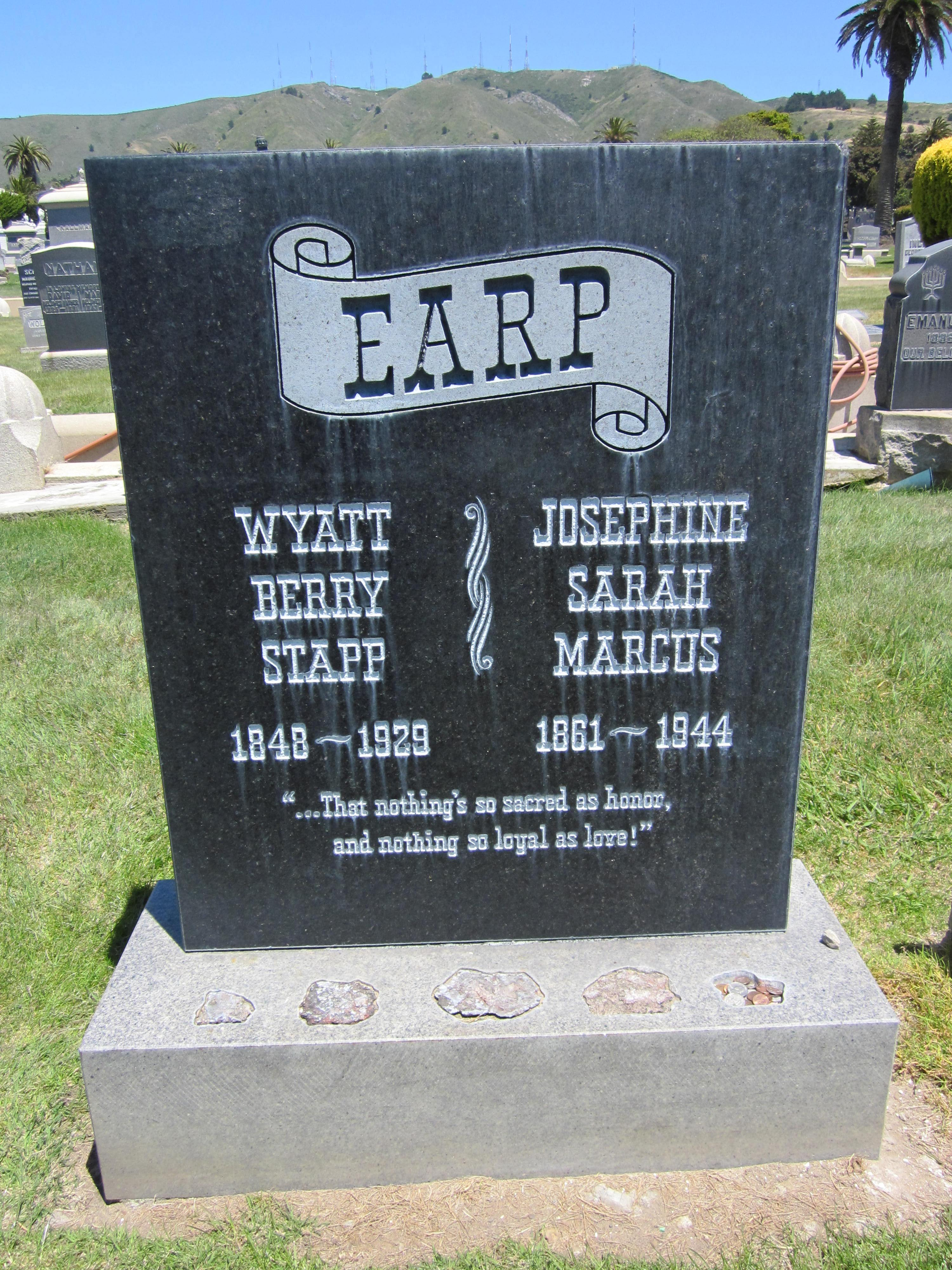
Wyatt and Josephine Earp grave at Hills of Eternity Memorial Park

Emanu-El Hart (or the "Old Jewish Cemetery") was built in 1847 at Gough Street and Vallejo Street in San Francisco; by 1860 the graves were relocated to an area that is now Mission Dolores Park and this served as a cemetery for both the Congregation Emanu-El and the Congregation Sherith Israel. When the city of San Francisco started to see dramatic growth in population; it was decided to move the cemetery outside of the city to Colma and they established Home of Peace Cemetery and Hills of Eternity Memorial Park with each cemetery serving a different congregation.

== Notable burials ==
- Jacob W. Davis (1831–1908), Russian Empire-born (now Latvia) American tailor, credited with inventing modern jeans.
- Josephine Earp (1861–1944), the common-law wife of Wyatt Earp.
- Wyatt Earp (1848–1929), gambler and Old West lawman.
- Dianne Feinstein (1933–2023), United States Senator from California and mayor of San Francisco.
- Phil Goldman (1964–2003), software engineer and entrepreneur, co-founded WebTV.
- Lionel Mark Jacobs (1840–1922), businessman and politician.
- Savely Kramarov (1934–1995), a Soviet-born Russian American actor.
- Isaac Magnin (1842–1907), Dutch-born American businessperson, carver and gilder; co-founder of I. Magnin.
- Mary Ann Magnin (1850–1943), Dutch-born American businessperson and the co-founder of I. Magnin.
- Judith Graham Pool (1919–1975), doctor known for the discovery of cryoprecipitation.

== See also ==
- List of cemeteries in California
- Bereavement in Judaism
