= Magnan =

Magnan may refer to:

- Magnan (surname)
- Magnan, Gers, a commune in Gers department, France
- Magnan (river), a river in Alpes-Maritimes department, France
- Magnan Lake (Gouin Reservoir), Quebec, Canada
