= Citrus Village =

Shopping center in Redlands, California, US

Coordinates: 34.0468275°N 117.1699384°W

Citrus Village is a shopping center in Redlands, California, on Redlands Boulevard between E. Palm Ave and E. Cypress Ave. One of the earliest planned shopping centers in the area and upon its opening on November 2, 1959, the largest retail area in Redlands, costing $2 million and housing 20 shops under one air-conditioned roof. Sage's Complete Shopping was the original main anchor, a large supermarket which included a pharmacy and lunch counter.

In 1967 it added 33,000 square feet to the complex and in May 1970 a 24,000-square-foot (2,200 m^{2}) "Milton's" apparel store, run by Milton Sage, owner of Sage's.

Webb's, a department store from Glendale, California, opened its first branch store here, measuring 42,000 square feet, on August 30, 1973 in the Citrus Village shopping center, a small center with 16 specialty stores.

Today, the shopping center is currently anchored by an Albertsons supermarket and Rite Aid pharmacy. As of 2026, Rite Aid shut its doors sometime in 2025, although Albertsons is still in the shopping center.
