= Webb's =

Department store in Glendale, California

- Type: Private
- Industry: Retail (Department store)
- Founded: 1917; 109 years ago in Glendale, California, United States
- Founder: Harry S. Webb
- Defunct: 1985
- Fate: Closed due to falling sales
- Headquarters: Glendale, California, United States
- Area served: Glendale and Redlands, California
- Key people: Harry S. Webb (founder), Ned Blanc (owner from 1949)
- Products: Department store goods
- Owner: Ned Blanc (from 1949)

Webb's a.k.a. H. S. Webb, was a department store based in Glendale, California, the first in that city.

== Origins ==
The store was founded by Harry S. Webb (d. 1947) in 1917 in Downtown Glendale in a single room. It had locations in the Glendale Fashion Center and in Redlands, California.

Ned Blanc purchased the store from Webb in 1949 but kept the name.

In 1951 Blanc expanded the original store at 139 N. Brand into the adjacent Lawson Building.

There was a fire at the store in 1977. Webb's moved to a former J. C. Penney store about half the size of Webb's original store, on the southeast corner of Brand Blvd. and California Avenue.

== Glendale Fashion Center ==
Two years later, it moved to the Glendale Fashion Center in a space vacated by Joseph Magnin when that store moved to the Glendale Galleria. Webb's expanded the space from 30,000 to 67,500 square feet and moved into it on September 27, 1979.

== Decline ==
For half a century, Webb's was the only major department store in Glendale. Competition first came from J. W. Robinson's which opened in the Glendale Fashion Center in 1966, and then from the Glendale Galleria, which opened in 1976 and a second phase in 1982. That mall offered branches of The Broadway, Buffums, J. C. Penney, Mervyn's and Nordstrom.

Sales peaked at $8 million in 1974, but averaged about $5 million per year during its last six years in business. The Glendale store closed in 1985 due to falling sales. It had 30,000 charge account holders at that time.

== Redlands store ==
The Redlands store measured 42,000 square feet and opened on August 30, 1973 in the Citrus Village shopping center, a small center with 16 specialty stores.
