= Carmel Plaza =

Shopping center in California

Coordinates: 36.55445°N 121.92054°W

Carmel Plaza is a 111,980 sq ft (10,403 m^{2}) self-described "upscale, outdoor lifestyle shopping center" in Carmel-by-the-Sea, California, in the block bounded by Ocean, Junipero, Mission and 7th streets. It is currently anchored by Anthropologie and is home to luxury goods retailers such as Tiffany. Three stories of shops surround an open-air courtyard.

Despite its small size, the center has been host to small branches of three department stores. At opening on August 18, 1960, I. Magnin opened a 10,000 sq ft (930 m^{2}) store here. Both the store and the center were designed by architect Olof Dahlstrand. Joseph Magnin opened in 1974. After the Joseph Magnin chain closed in 1984, Saks Fifth Avenue opened on May 31, 1986.

The shopping mall was built in 1960 by Gerson Bakar and Steve Jacobs. It was sold to Macerich in 1998, and again to the O'Connor Group in 2012.
