= Magnan (surname) =

Magnan is a French surname. Notable people with the surname include:

- Antoine Magnan (1881–1938), French zoologist and aeronautical engineer
- Bernard Pierre Magnan (1791–1865), Marshal of France
- Clothilde Magnan (born 1973), French fencer
- Dominique Magnan (1731–1796), French Minim friar
- Jean-Claude Magnan (born 1941), French fencer
- Marc Magnan (born 1962), Canadian ice hockey player
- Octave Magnan (1836–1921), Canadian politician
- Olivier Magnan (born 1986), Canadian ice hockey player
- Valentin Magnan (1835–1916), French psychiatrist

== See also ==
- Magnin, a surname
