= Edgar Magnin =

Rabbi of Wilshire Boulevard Temple

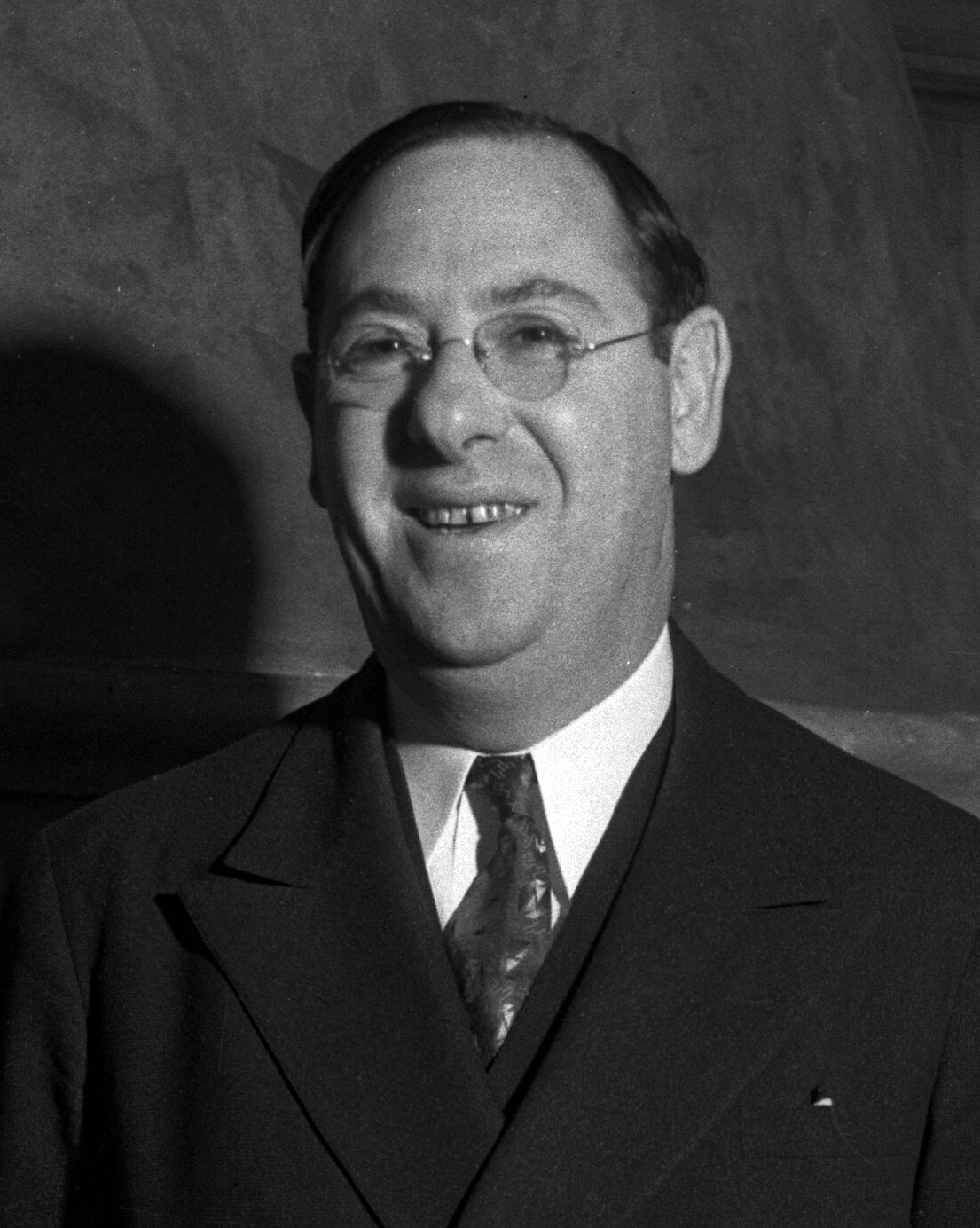
- Magnin in 1935
- Born: July 1, 1890; San Francisco, California, U.S.
- Died: July 17, 1984 (aged 94); Los Angeles, California, U.S.
- Resting place: Home of Peace Cemetery
- Occupation: Rabbi
- Spouse: Evelyn Magnin
- Children: 1 son, 1 daughter (Mae Magnin Brussell)

Edgar Magnin (July 1, 1890 – July 17, 1984) was rabbi and spiritual leader of Wilshire Boulevard Temple (previously Congregation B'nai B'rith), the oldest Jewish congregation in Los Angeles, California. Magnin served at the temple for 69 years and was considered one of the most prominent Jewish leaders in the United States, sometimes called the "Rabbi to the Stars" because of his close connections to the Hollywood film industry.

== Early life ==
Edgar Fogel Magnin was born on July 1, 1890, in San Francisco, California. His grandparents, Mary Ann Magnin and Isaac Magnin, founded the I. Magnin department store chain. He was ordained in Judaism's Reform movement by the Hebrew Union College in 1914.

== Career ==
Magnin became the rabbi of Congregation B'nai B'rith in Los Angeles, California in 1915. After becoming senior rabbi of the oldest Jewish congregation in Los Angeles in 1919, he distinguished his sixty-nine-year tenure at Wilshire Boulevard Temple through close ties with the motion picture and television industry.

Magnin was in charge of the temple during the construction and opening of its Wilshire Center building, now listed on the National Register of Historic Places. The building is known for its distinctive stained glass windows and its immense Byzantine revival dome. It is also known for Magnin's decision to include biblically-themed figurative murals, now known as the Warner Murals; these were highly unusual, given Judaism's traditional avoidance of figurative synagogue art.

Magnin was active in Los Angeles civic affairs and in interfaith dialogue. He was a charter board member of the Hollywood Bowl. Among the many life-cycle events he performed were the wedding of Norma Shearer and Irving Thalberg, and the funerals of numerous entertainment figures and movie moguls. He participated in the inaugural ceremonies of Presidents Richard M. Nixon and Ronald Reagan, and served on more than 20 executive boards and advisory councils.

== Personal life ==
He was married to Evelyn Magnin. They had a son and a daughter, radio host and conspiracy theorist Mae Brussell. They resided in Beverly Hills, California.

== Death ==
Magnin died on July 17, 1984, in Beverly Hills, California. He is buried at the Home of Peace Cemetery in East Los Angeles, California.
