= Lionel M. Jacobs =

American banker and politician (1840–1922)

Lionel Mark Jacobs
- Occupations: Businessman & Politician

Lionel Mark Jacobs (July 10, 1840 – February 7, 1922) was an American businessman and politician. Moving to Arizona Territory with his brother in 1867 to open a mercantile business, his business interests expanded into financial services and he was a co-founder of Tucson's first bank. Politically he was a member of the Arizona Territorial Legislature and served as territorial treasurer.

== Early life and education ==
Jacobs was born in London, England on July 10, 1840 to Mark Israel and Hannah (Solomon) Jacobs. He was the third of twelve children. His family moved to Baltimore in 1844 and young Jacobs was educated in local schools. His father went to California as part of the California Gold Rush with the rest of the family joining him in San Diego by 1851. There, the younger Jacobs helped establish the San Diego Lyceum and Debating Club and served as the group's first secretary. His family moved to San Bernardino in 1859, where, with the help of a partner, they operated two stores and a hotel.

== Relocation to Tucson ==
In April 1867, Jacobs' father spotted an announcement in the San Francisco Chronicle that the capital of Arizona Territory would be relocated to Tucson on November 1 of that year. Realizing the influx of governmental and military would likely cause Tucson's population to double to over 5,000 inhabitants, the elder Jacobs decided to send Lionel and his brother Barron to establish a branch of the family store in the new capital. Upon their arrival in Tucson, the brothers spent a day surveying the town, introducing themselves to the locals, and locating a store to rent.

They initially saw great success, quickly selling the load of merchandise they had brought with them along with two additional shipments from California. In June 1868, a shipment of merchandise was lost when the ship carrying it sank after striking a log embedded in a sandbar. The loss of the shipment forced the family business to declare bankruptcy. For a month, Lionel worked to fix problems with the way the business had shipped merchandise from California while his father came to terms with their creditors. In September 1868, the brothers received another shipment of merchandise and were back in business.

To improve business, the brothers spent their evenings in the town's saloons getting to know their customers. Lionel quickly learned enough Spanish to converse with the Mexican population. The brothers also became known for their ability to obtain hard to find items. They obtained "uncommon items like mirrors, violin and flute sheet music ... everything from hairpins to harmonicas" for their customers. By 1870, the brothers were able to invest their profits from the store into other ventures.

== Expansion into financial activities ==
Due to the expense of transporting goods to Tucson, most goods sold there demanded very high prices. A barrel of flour that could be purchased for $4 or $5 in San Francisco could go for $25 in Tucson. Due to these high prices, Tucson merchants were often forced to accept payment in instalments. Taking their father's advice to remember "the great power of money" and to "deal less in calico and more in money", the brothers began to offer other financial services to their customers.

At the time, Arizona Territory faced a shortage of hard currency. Banks outside the territory refused to ship money to Tucson due to the risk of robbery. Meanwhile, people in the territory avoided using banknotes because it was difficult to determine the fair value of a note issued by a distant bank. This limited the supply of currency to greenbacks and gold or silver coins. Between these two option, coins where the preferred currency. Greenbacks traded at a discount in Tucson, usually being worth between 65¢ and 85¢ on the dollar. In California, where hard currency was relatively abundant, greenbacks commanded a higher price.

Seeing an arbitrage opportunity in early 1870, the brothers opened a currency exchange within their mercantile business. Their father began mailing $200 in gold coins every week. The brothers exchanged the gold for greenbacks and shipped the paper money back to their father in San Francisco where it was used to buy more gold coins. By the end of the year the brothers were exchanging $4000/month, generating roughly $1000/month in profits. At the same time, the southern Arizona economy benefited from an increased availability of hard currency.

From their currency exchange, the brothers expanded into other financial services. In 1871, six years before the territory's first bank opened, they began offering loans. In 1875, they began to accept deposits and storing personal items in their company's safe. The same year, with the retirement of their father, the store name was changed to L. M. Jacobs & Company. A debt collection service was later added.

== Founding of Pima County Bank ==
By November 1877, Tucson was quickly growing and developments such as the railroads reaching Yuma and Ed Schieffelin's discovery of silver at Tombstone promised to accelerate the trend. The brothers decided to invest their resources and found a bank operating separately from their mercantile business, but were initially unable to raise the needed capital. They eventually partnered with Pinckney R. Tully, E. B. Gage, and others to open the Pima County Bank on January 2, 1879. While Phillip William Smith was elected the bank's first president, Jacobs was named as cashier and placed in charge of the bank's day-to-day operations. A rival bank, established by Anson P. K. Safford and James Henry Toole and others, opened three months later. Despite concerns that Tucson lacked the resources to support two banks, both establishments thrived for several years. In January 1880, Jacobs turned over his position as cashier to his brother Barron. With the growing demand imposed upon them by being bankers, the Jacobs brothers ended operation of their mercantile business in February 1880.

Jacobs and his brother continued to work at the Pima County Bank for the next three decades. From 1882 to 1885, the bank operated as the First National Bank of Tucson under a national charter. Between 1883 and 1890, Jacobs oversaw the Tombstone branch of the bank, which became an independent venture under the Cochise County Bank name. An economic downturn during the mid-1880s lead to the Tucson branch being renamed the Bank of Tucson before it found additional investors and became the Consolidated Bank of Tucson. The Cochise County Bank was closed in early 1890 following the closure of the Tombstone's mines.

== Political activity ==
Besides his business interests, Jacobs became active in civic matters. He was appointed to the Pima County Board of Supervisors on January 3, 1871. A week later he was elected the board's chairman. Jacobs was elected to the 1873 session of the territorial legislature. This was followed closely by him being appointed territorial treasurer. The appointment occurred after his brother, Barron, vacated the position because the territorial legislature refused to confirm his nomination. Jacobs signed his oath of office on March 7, 1873 and resigned on July 9 to allow Pinckney R. Tully to take the position. Jacobs was one of three delegates sent to Washington, D.C., in 1901 to lobby the U.S. Congress for Arizona statehood and he represented the territory at the Trans-Mississippi Commercial Congress.

== Personal life ==
Beyond his business interests, Jacobs was socially active. He was active in the Arizona Social Club and Tucson Literary Society while being an off and on member of Tucson's Owls Club between 1891 and 1899. Following the 1906 San Francisco earthquake, he oversaw Tucson's victim relief fund. Jacobs married Bertha Frank of San Francisco on June 15, 1909. Lionel and Bertha had no children. He retired in 1913. Jacobs died in San Francisco on February 7, 1922. He was buried in the Hills of Eternity Memorial Park in Colma, California.
