= Glendale Fashion Center =

Former shopping mall in Glendale, California

Coordinates: 34.1484419°N 118.2481995°W

Glendale Fashion Center was a regional shopping mall in Glendale, California anchored by department stores, which today is the site of a large power center by the same name.

The center opened in 1966 anchored by a J. W. Robinson's department store, as well as Joseph Magnin and Desmond's, with a total of 25 retailers. Later, Joseph Magnin moved to the Glendale Galleria and a local retailer, Webb's, expanded the space from 30,000 to 67,500 square feet and moved into it on September 27, 1979.

After damage from the 1994 Northridge earthquake, the mall was demolished and the site was turned into an open-air power center, the 264,474-square-foot center with anchors including World Market, Michaels, Ross Dress for Less, Ralphs supermarket, Staples, TJ Maxx, Total Wine, Bath & Body Works and Nordstrom Rack.
