= Adolph Schuman =

American businessman

Adolph P. Schuman (1902–1985) was a prominent San Francisco businessman. He was the founder and president of the Lilli Ann apparel company, and a longtime Democratic Party campaign contributor who had close ties to John F. Kennedy and Robert F. Kennedy.

His father was a Hungarian Jewish immigrant who came to America in the 1880s, was a diamond broker in San Francisco. Adolph started a wholesale women's clothing company in 1933 in two rented rooms with an $800 loan from his friend Rudy Schucci who drove a milk truck. In 1982, Lilli Ann reported retail sales of $20 million.

After World War II, Schuman opened a Lilli Ann showroom in Paris and promoted his line by organizing a “San Francisco to Paris Fashion Show”, with lavish runway productions in both cities which brought him into personal contact with such leading Paris fashion designers as Coco Chanel and Cristóbal Balenciaga. At the same time, Schuman's purchase of huge quantities of European fabrics helped revitalize the war-ravaged French and Italian textile industries in the early 1950s.

A liberal Democrat, Schuman frequently held campaign fund-raising dinners and parties at his Nob Hill home, and was one of the four wealthy San Francisco Jewish political contributors - the others were Cyril Magnin, Benjamin Swig and Walter Shorenstein - who formed what local Democratic politicians appreciatively called "The Green Machine" of the 1960s.
