= Country Club Centre =

Country Club Centre (Arden-Arcade)
- Location: El Camino & Watt Avenues, Sacramento, California, United States
- Coordinates: 38.608806°N 121.384661°W
- Opened: 1952
- Closed: 1992 (enclosed mall)
- Developer: James J. Cordano Company, Blumenfeld Enterprises
- Owner: Tourmaline Capital Management
- Num. of stores: 5
- Num. of anchor tenants: 4 (1 open, 3 vacant)
- Floor area: 370,353 square feet (34,406.9 m^{2}) (GLA)
- Floors: 1 (2 in the rear of the main building)

Country Club Centre is a shopping center in Arden-Arcade, California, United States (with a Sacramento address), in unincorporated Sacramento County of the Sacramento area. It is located at the southwest corner of El Camino and Watt Avenues, diagonally across from what was the first stand-alone store of the now defunct Tower Records chain. It originally opened as a small strip shopping center in 1952 that was later expanded into a regional mall and then later converted into a mixed use of office and retail.

As of 2026, the shopping center is anchored by the Sacramento area's only Costco Business Center. It was previously anchored by Walmart, Sam's Club, and Michaels.

== History ==
As one of the first suburban shopping centers in the Sacramento area, Country Club Centre opened on August 21, 1952, with a 40,000 sq ft (3,700 m^{2}) JCPenney and a Lucky supermarket anchoring the shopping center. Later additions included Joseph Magnin, Walgreens, Woolworth and a three-story Rhodes department store in 1954, which later became a Liberty House in 1976, anchoring the west end of the mall.

In 1971, JCPenney closed its store, relocating across Watt Avenue to the newer Country Club Plaza with a much larger store, which later relocated to Arden Fair Mall in 1994. Other retailers also withdrew from Country Club Centre, including Woolworth, which also relocated to Country Club Plaza.

In 1976, after experiencing a small decline, a Montgomery Ward opened up as the new east end anchor (which replaced Lucky), as well as a Longs Drugs, extension of the covered mall and addition of 6 acres (24,000 m^{2}) of parking facilities, sparking the Sacramento Bee to comment on its "strong comeback." At that time, store space totaled 680,790 square feet (63,247 m^{2}), 89% of which was leased.

In the 1980s, Country Club Centre saw a much sharper decline when Liberty House shuttered its store in 1984, followed by Joseph Magnin when the chain declared bankruptcy and shuttered all their remaining stores. In June 1987, after going through many absentee owners, including a possible name change to Sacramento Place, but never materialized, local Sacramento developer Marvin "Buzz" Oates acquired the shopping center from Macerich. By the early 1990s, much of the interior mall shops were vacant, further hampered by Country Club Plaza across Watt Avenue and the huge expansion of Arden Fair. The interior wing that connected Liberty House was later torn down for additional parking and access to the rear of the shopping center and the old Liberty House was later repurposed into an office building. Most of the mall's interior shops were then converted to office space. In 1992, Pace Membership Warehouse opened in the southwest corner of the shopping center. It was later rebranded to Sam's Club in 1994 when parent company Walmart acquired Pace from Kmart in 1993. In the later years, Longs Drugs shuttered their store and relocated about 1 mile (1.6 km) south on nearby Arden Way, where it was in operation as a CVS Pharmacy after the chain acquired Longs in 2008 and was converted to CVS in 2009. CVS shuttered the store on January 18, 2024.

In 2001, Montgomery Ward, the last traditional department store anchor, shuttered its store as the chain went out of business. A full renovation of the shopping center occurred in 2002, to bring it and its look up to date, which included the opening of an Office Depot store (it would later relocate across Watt Avenue to Country Club Plaza in 2013, before shuttering altogether a few years later). Walmart opened in 2004 in the former Montgomery Ward building.

In 2015, Country Club Centre was sold to San Diego investors Tourmaline Capital Management for $56 million. At that time, in addition to Walmart and Sam's Club, the shopping center was also anchored by Michaels and Anna's Linens. Anna's Linens was shuttered the same year when the chain filed for bankruptcy.

In 2018, the shopping center lost two of its major anchors. Sam's Club shuttered its warehouse store on January 26 and Walmart shuttered its store on February 9. Michaels soon followed suit when their store relocated to the Howe 'Bout Arden shopping center about 3 miles (4.8 km) away on Arden Way. This, in effect, left Country Club Centre anchorless for the first time in its history.

On June 4, 2020, the center gained back an anchor store as the first Costco Business Center in the Sacramento area opened in the former Sam's Club.

In 2021, the Walmart was demolished and part of it was rebuilt into a smaller single-story retail building. The newly built anchor spot was slated to become an Amazon Fresh store, but the opening of the store was put on hold at first after Amazon placed a hiatus on opening new stores to reevaluate the operations of its current stores. The future opening of the store was nullified when Amazon announced on January 27, 2026, that all Amazon Fresh stores and its smaller format Amazon Go stores would close.

As of 2026, with the exception of Costco, the center is mostly vacant, including the aforementioned anchors. The store was shuttered in July 2024.
