= May Slessinger =

American painter

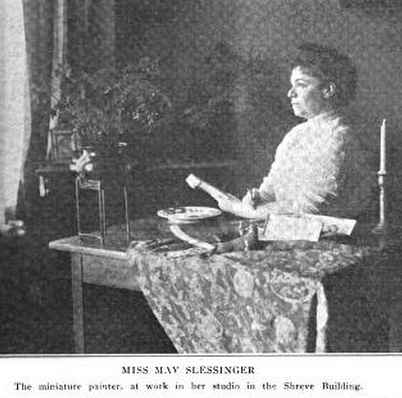
- May Slessinger, from a 1910 publication.
- Born: Mary Slessinger; May 4, 1872; San Francisco, California
- Died: October 25, 1954 (aged 82); San Francisco, California
- Other names: Mae Slessinger, May Slessinger Bachman (after 1922)
- Occupation: Artist

May Slessinger (May 4, 1872 – October 25, 1954) was an American artist specializing in miniatures, based in San Francisco, California.

== Early life ==
May Slessinger was born on May 4, 1872, in San Francisco, California, the daughter of Lewis (or Louis) Slessinger and Caroline Price Slessinger. Her Bavarian-born father, a shoemaker by training, was an American Civil War veteran, and one of the city's first businessmen. The Slessinger family was Jewish.

== Career ==
Slessinger was a painter who specialized in painting miniature portraits. She was a member of the San Francisco Art Association. Of her work at one of the Association's shows in 1903, one report commented that "Miss May Slessinger's work is of a high order of merit, for it shows the fire of the true artist and the technique of a careful worker. One of her miniatures is the size of a dime and every detail of the subject is carefully wrought."

Slessinger made miniature portraits of several prominent San Francisco citizens, including artist William Keith, businesswoman Mary Ann Magnin and her son Grover Magnin, and Elizabeth Meyerfeld Roos, the daughter of theatrical entrepreneur Morris Meyerfeld Jr. In 1920, Queen Marie of Romania named Slessinger her court miniaturist, in appreciation of Slessinger's portrait of the queen; dancer Loie Fuller, working with the Red Cross in Rumania during World War I, suggested Slessinger for the portrait commission.

== Personal life ==
Slessinger married oil executive David S. Bachman in 1922, on his deathbed and inherited half his fortune. She lived for many years at the Fairmont Hotel and died on October 25, 1954, in San Francisco. She was 82. Slessinger left a large estate to benefit her relatives and research at the Mount Zion Hospital.
