= Desert Fashion Plaza =

Former shopping mall in Palm Springs, California

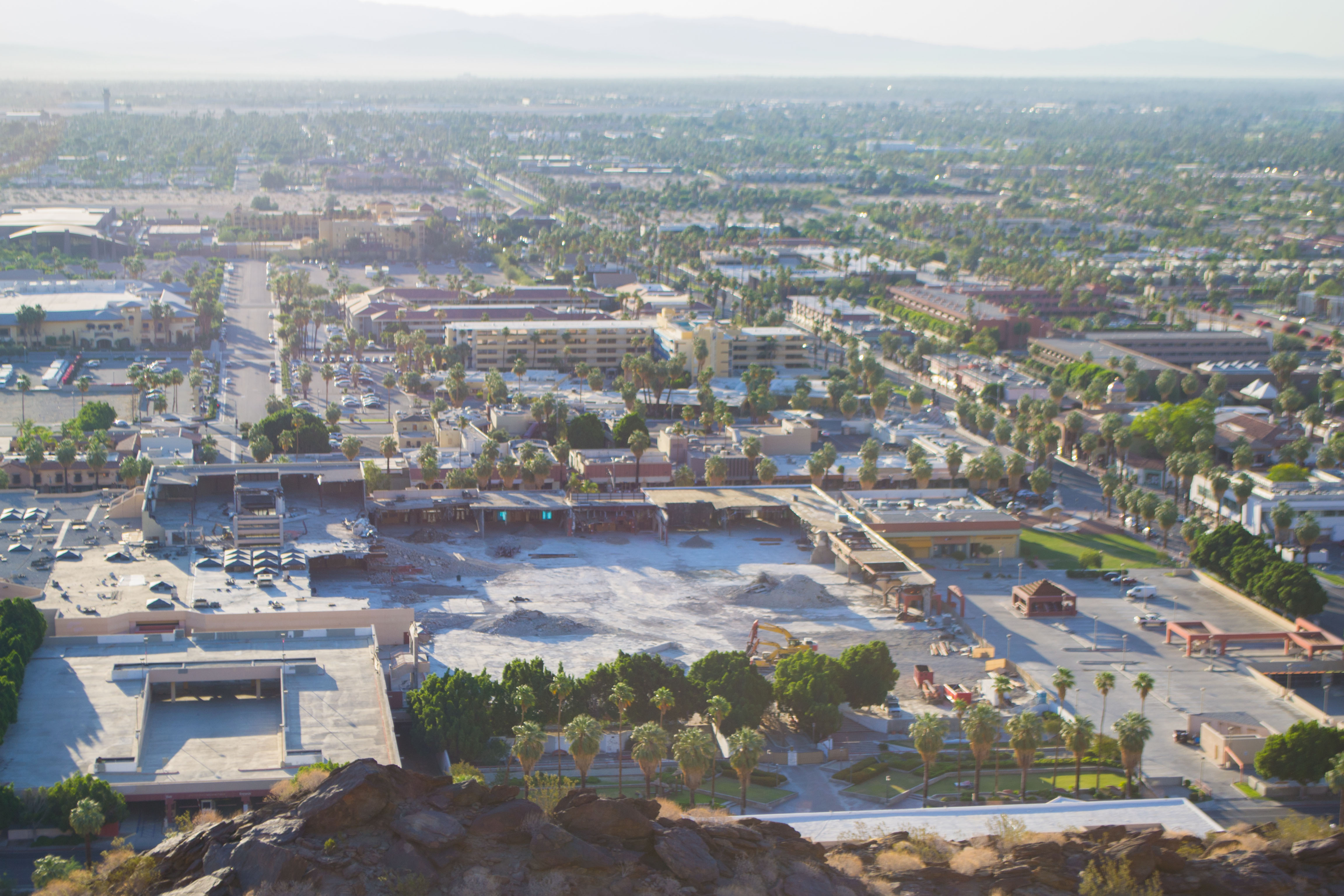
- Aerial view of the mall during demolition in 2013.
- Location: Palm Springs, California
- Address: 123 N Palm Canyon Dr, Palm Springs, CA 92262
- Opened: October 16, 1967
- Closed: 1992
- Demolished: February 7, 2013–2014
- Previous names: Desert Inn Fashion Plaza (1967–1985)
- Developer: Home Savings and Loan Association; Joseph K. Eichenbaum
- Manager: Grit Development
- Owner: Grit Development
- Architect: Charles Luckman.
- Num. of stores: 0 (space for 100+)
- Num. of anchor tenants: 0 (space for 2)
- Floors: 1 (2 in Saks Fifth Avenue; 3 in I. Magnin)

Desert Fashion Plaza, formerly known as Desert Inn Fashion Plaza, was an enclosed shopping mall located in Palm Springs, California. The mall was originally developed by the Home Savings and Loan Association, which sold the shopping center to Desert Plaza Partnership.

In the early 1980s, Desert Plaza Partnership sold the property to DeBartolo Corporation which expanded and revamped the mall to accommodate more shops. Subsequently, sales declined prompting major retailers to close down business at the Desert Fashion Plaza. In 2002, John Wessman of Wessman Development bought the property and proposed a significant redevelopment of the whole site. Demolition began to take place in 2013, and shops, restaurants, and a six-story hotel have opened on part of the site with more planned.

Former anchor tenants in the mall were Saks Fifth Avenue, I. Magnin, and Bank of America.

== History ==
The site of the Desert Fashion Plaza was formerly a resort hotel named the Desert Inn opened and operated by Nellie Coffman, an early settler of Palm Springs. After Nellie's death in the 1950s, her sons George Roberson and Earl Coffman, who had continuously assisted Nellie in the operation of the Inn, sold it in 1955 to actress Marion Davies.

By April 1956, there were plans for a $4.5 million, five-story hotel and shopping center on the site. The project would have originally included a swimming pool, a Las Vegas-style restaurant, and a theater for both Broadway plays and cinema films during the winter and summer seasons, respectively. The hotel itself would accommodate 200 rooms and suites, along with a parking space for 1,000 cars. Victor Gruen and Associates were to be the architects to design the project, with Joseph Bliti of New York being contracted for the proposed construction. The proposed center was scheduled for completion by November 1957. However, the plans never came to fruition due to Davies's health deteriorating at the time.

Davies eventually sold the land for $2.5 million to developers Samuel Firks and George Alexander in 1960. Alexander and Firks originally envisioned an eight-story hotel that would accommodate 300 rooms and a 1,600 parking space facility for a proposed $4 million. Plans for redeveloping the Desert Inn fell, which prompted the Alexander Construction Company to focus more on using the property for commercial use instead.

On November 14, 1965, Alexander and his spouse Mildred, along with their son Robert and his wife Helene, were all killed when their plane impacted shortly after taking off from Palm Springs International Airport. The plane was expected to reach Hollywood-Lockheed Air Terminal, but the plane lost control while in flight and collided with the Chocolate Mountains region near Indio, California. All plans for redeveloping the old site were dropped.

=== Operation ===
After Alexander's death, the Home Savings and Loan Association obtained the Desert Inn property in 1966. That same year, developer Joseph K. Eichenbaum released a statement on plans to construct a multi-million dollar commercial center on the old site. Architect Charles Luckman was commissioned to design the new shopping mall. Demolition of the Desert Inn began in August 1966.

The Desert Inn Fashion Plaza was officially opened to the public on October 16, 1967, with the grand opening of a 20,000-square-foot I. Magnin, which represented the retailer's return to Palm Springs after its 1933 to 1942 presence with a resort shop at the El Mirador Hotel. A month before the mall opened, Luckman and Leonard R. Lockhart, the first vice president of the Home Savings and Loan Associates, were both honored by Southern California Edison for the all-electrical design.

In 1969, Joseph Magnin Co. broke ground on a 26,000-square-foot department store in the mall. The new store would anchor at the corner of North Palm Canyon Drive and Andreas Road and was set to open in September of the same year. San Francisco–based architects, Skidmore, Owings & Merrill, would design the store, along with contractors Diversified Builders, Inc.

In addition, 12 other major establishments also opened up in the new mall, including Bank of America, Belmont Savings & Loan, P'iddlers Three Restaurant, Stuard's Sahara, Silverwoods, Islamania, Michael's, Robert Sands Hairstyling, Master's Candies, Village Card & Gift Shop and Orange Julius.

In 1978, the Home Savings and Loan Associates sold the Desert Inn Fashion Plaza to Desert Plaza Partnership. The group compromised Arthur Gilbert, David Blum and Gerson Fox; three partners that were based in Los Angeles.

=== Expansion ===
During the 1980s, major shopping destinations such as Palm Desert Town Center and the El Paseo Shopping District were growing rapidly in Palm Desert, California. National chains also opened up businesses throughout the Palm Desert area. Because of this, most local shops that were in the central hub of Palm Springs began to shift away into other areas that were also seeing growth. This situation prompted Desert Plaza Partnership to focus on plans to expand the mall.

In 1983, Edward J. DeBartolo Corp. announced an agreement with Desert Plaza Partnership to renovate the Desert Inn Fashion Plaza for $42 million. The Ohio-based corporation planned to enlarge the mall to accommodate more tenants, a six-story hotel, and underground parking. Meanwhile, the local redevelopment agency was authorized to help developers acquire the additional property needed for the potential project.

In 1984, the redevelopment took place by first razing historic-period buildings on the site and setting up the new section on top. At the same time, Joseph Magnin announced that they would close their remaining 24 stores, including the one in Palm Springs due to bankruptcy.

The mall was officially opened on November 16, 1985, under the new name of Desert Fashion Plaza. I. Magnin and Saks Fifth Avenue would serve as the main anchors of the newly redeveloped mall, as well as a hotel called Maxim's Paris Suite Hotel.

=== Decline ===
Despite the new stores that were opened, mall traffic did not increase considerably. In the years to come, retail sales declined and by 1991, Silverwoods men's clothing and Marie Callender's moved out of the still partially vacant Desert Fashion Plaza. Hyatt Regency Suites bought the hotel management and renamed it as Hyatt Palm Springs.

In 1992, R.H. Macy & Co. closed the Palm Springs location of I. Magnin after several years in operation, cited that their store was not a “suitable location" at the Desert Fashion Plaza.

In 1995, developer Mark Bragg, a former adviser to Ronald Reagan, and the ever-present Eddie DeBartolo Jr. teamed up to pass a measure which approved card clubs at three sites: two controlled by Bragg, and the third at DeBartolo's Desert Fashion Plaza mall. Palm Springs voted a ballot by a 2-to-1 margin for the gambling establishment.

At a cost of $13.5 million, Phoenix-based Arizona Partners became the new owners of Desert Fashion Plaza. Arizona Partners planned on expanding the Desert Fashion Plaza to over 350,000 square feet and removing the roof to make the mall open-air. The main entrance was to be an open-air plaza with outdoor dining, shops, and gathering places, plus a 3,000-seat cinema and a 2,400-seat live theater; the project would have been renamed The Promenade. The first phase of the project would begin in mid-1998 and be completed sometime at the end of the year.

By the beginning of 1999, about 75% of the tenants inside the mall were closed down. At the same time, San Diego–based Excel Legacy Corporation scrapped Arizona Partners's concepts and proposed its own project. Developer MBK Southern California Ltd. would design the center. Their decision was to bulldoze the whole mall and replace it with an open-air plaza. Proposed tenants included Saks, a two-story multiplex theater, a food court, a gourmet market, restaurants and various specialty shops. However, the concept was never realized, and the owners decided to sell the mall for an asking price of $25 million.

In 2000, the Agua Caliente Development Authority, a subsidiary of the Agua Caliente Band of Cahuilla Indians, considered the purchase and redevelopment of Desert Fashion Plaza and were in discussions with Palm Springs city officials and the director of the Palm Springs Desert Museum. Agua Caliente ultimately made the decision not to buy the property.

Developer John Wessman purchased the Desert Fashion Plaza and initially planned a Spanish-Mediterranean plaza on the site. Simultaneously, Saks Fifth Avenue closed down its location and moved to a new store in the El Paseo shopping district in Palm Desert. At the same time, the attacks on September 11, 2001, caused the project to slow down.

== Demolition and redevelopment ==
In 2011, it was announced that workers were to begin the process of removing the large tent behind the mall, which was removed in several phrases with the first stage.

The mall was used as the set for the fictional S'wallow Valley Mall in the 2012 comedy film, Tim and Eric's Billion Dollar Movie.

After more than a decade since the mall sat empty, the redevelopment finally moved forward on February 7, 2013, with the demolition of the mall. The large, vacant property would be turned into an outdoor shopping center with new shops, restaurants, and a six-story hotel. Wessman pledged that the demolition of the plaza would take just four months and that 90% of the materials would be recycled.

Before the construction commenced in the middle of the same year, a lawsuit was filed by Frank Tysen, a member of the Citizens for a Sustainable Palm Springs, and owner of Casa Cody Bed & Breakfast. Tysen and his group were suing because they believed the city did not follow the proper protocol when it came to a petition that was submitted. The petition asked the city to place a portion of the concept on a ticket. However, the city of Palm Springs opted out of the deal saying that the redevelopment action was considered as administrative, and not legislative action. In April 2014, the court denied the halt of the project.

Demolition was completed in 2014. A Kimpton Hotel (Rowan) opened in 2017 on the southeast portion of the site. Other shops on or near the former mall property include H&M and Free People, as well as several smaller shops and restaurants.
