= Mae Brussell =

American radio host (1922–1988)

Mae Magnin Brussell
- Born: Mae Magnin; May 29, 1922; Beverly Hills, California, US
- Died: October 3, 1988 (aged 66); Carmel-by-the-Sea, California, US
- Education: Stanford University; University of California, Berkeley
- Occupation: Radio host
- Children: 5
- Parent: Edgar Magnin
- Relatives: Isaac Magnin (paternal great-grandfather); Mary Ann Magnin (paternal great-grandmother)

Mae Magnin Brussell (May 29, 1922 – October 3, 1988) was an American radio personality and conspiracy theorist. She was the host of Dialogue: Conspiracy (later renamed World Watchers International).

== Early life ==
Mae Magnin was born on May 29, 1922, in Beverly Hills, California. Her father, Edgar Magnin, was a Reform rabbi at the Wilshire Boulevard Temple. Her paternal great-grandparents, Isaac Magnin and Mary Ann Magnin, were the founders of I. Magnin, an upscale women's clothing store in San Francisco, California.

She attended Stanford University in Palo Alto and received an associate degree from the University of California, Berkeley on June 3, 1942.

== Career ==
She was a radio host. Much of her radio programming focused on the conspiracy theories surrounding the assassination of President John F. Kennedy. She also covered the history of fascism.

Distraught by the murder of President Kennedy, she purchased all 26 printed volumes issued by the Warren Commission report, and attempted to make sense of them by cross-indexing the entire work with stories from major newspapers and magazines that she thought showed connections and patterns that she found disturbing.

Her career in radio started in May 1971 when, as a guest on the independently owned radio station KLRB, she questioned the Warren Commission. She suggested Lee Harvey Oswald might not have been the only person involved in the assassination of the president. She became a weekly guest. Shortly after, she became the host of Dialogue: Conspiracy (later renamed World Watchers International). From 1983 to 1988, she hosted the same show on KAZU, a radio station based in Pacific Grove.

Additionally, she wrote articles that were published in The Realist, a magazine published by Paul Krassner. An impressed John Lennon donated money so Krassner could afford to print Mae Brussell's work.

Brussell was profiled on Season 1, Episode six of Slate's Slow Burn podcast.

== Personal life ==
She married twice and had five children: two sons with her first husband, David Goodwin and John Goodwin; and three daughters with her second husband, Barbara Brussell, Keyenne Brussell, and Bonnie Brussell (who predeceased her in 1970).

== Death ==
She died of cancer on October 3, 1988 in Carmel-by-the-Sea, California.

== Bibliography ==
=== Articles ===
- "What's Your Opinion?" Monterey Peninsula Herald (Sep. 12, 1966).
- "Oswald Not a Communist?" Monterey Peninsula Herald (Jan. 17, 1967).
- "Who Killed Congressman Larry McDonald?" Hustler, vol. 10, no. 8 (Feb. 1984), pp. 40–44, 46, 52, 142, 194. Photos by Ladi von Jansky.

=== Collected works ===
- Constantine, Alex (ed). The Essential Mae Brussell: Investigations of Fascism in America. Introduction by Paul Krassner. Port Townsend, Was.: Feral House (2014). ISBN 978-1936239986, 1936239981. OCLC 937871969.
