= Lilli Ann =

American clothing company

Lilli Ann was a clothing company that was started in San Francisco, California in 1934 by Adolph Schuman, and named for his wife Lillian Brown.

== Lilli Ann company ==
Throughout the 1940s and 1950s, the company was known for its good workmanship and high-quality fabrics.

== Lilli Ann building ==
The former Lilli Ann building is at 2701 16th Street in the Mission District.

In 1986, local Chicano artist Elias Rocha painted a four-storey-high mural (46-feet by 46-feet), designed by Jesus "Chuy" Campusano on the 17th Street side wall of the Lilli Ann building, with the permission of the Lilli Ann Corp., and funded by $40,000 grant from the Mayor's Office of Community Development. The mural was painted over in July 1998, which spurred community protests, and a lawsuit. After more than a year of litigation, a settlement agreement awarded $200,000 to the plaintiffs, Andres Campusano and his sister, Sandra Campusano Camacho and Elias Rocha.

"The case ended with the payment of $200,000 by the Corts (Robert J. Cort, Individually and As Trustee of the Robert J. Cort Trust) in exchange for rights to the mural. St. Paul (St. Paul Fire and Marine Ins.) was the Corts' general liability carrier"

The mural will not be restored.

University Games Corporation has leased two floors of the Lilli Ann building.

== See also ==
- Visual Artists Rights Act
