= Joseph Magnin =

High-end department store

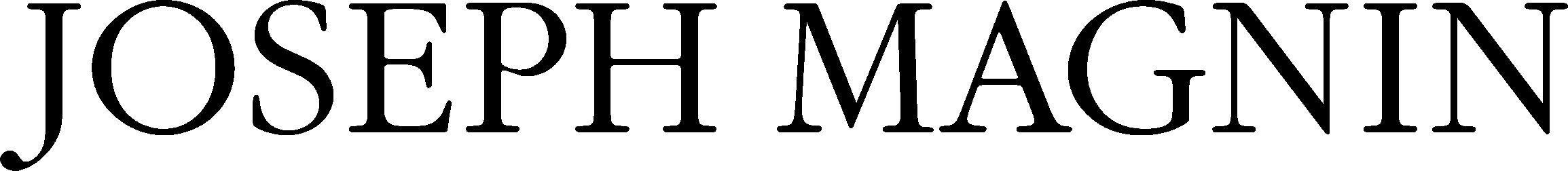
Joseph Magnin final logo

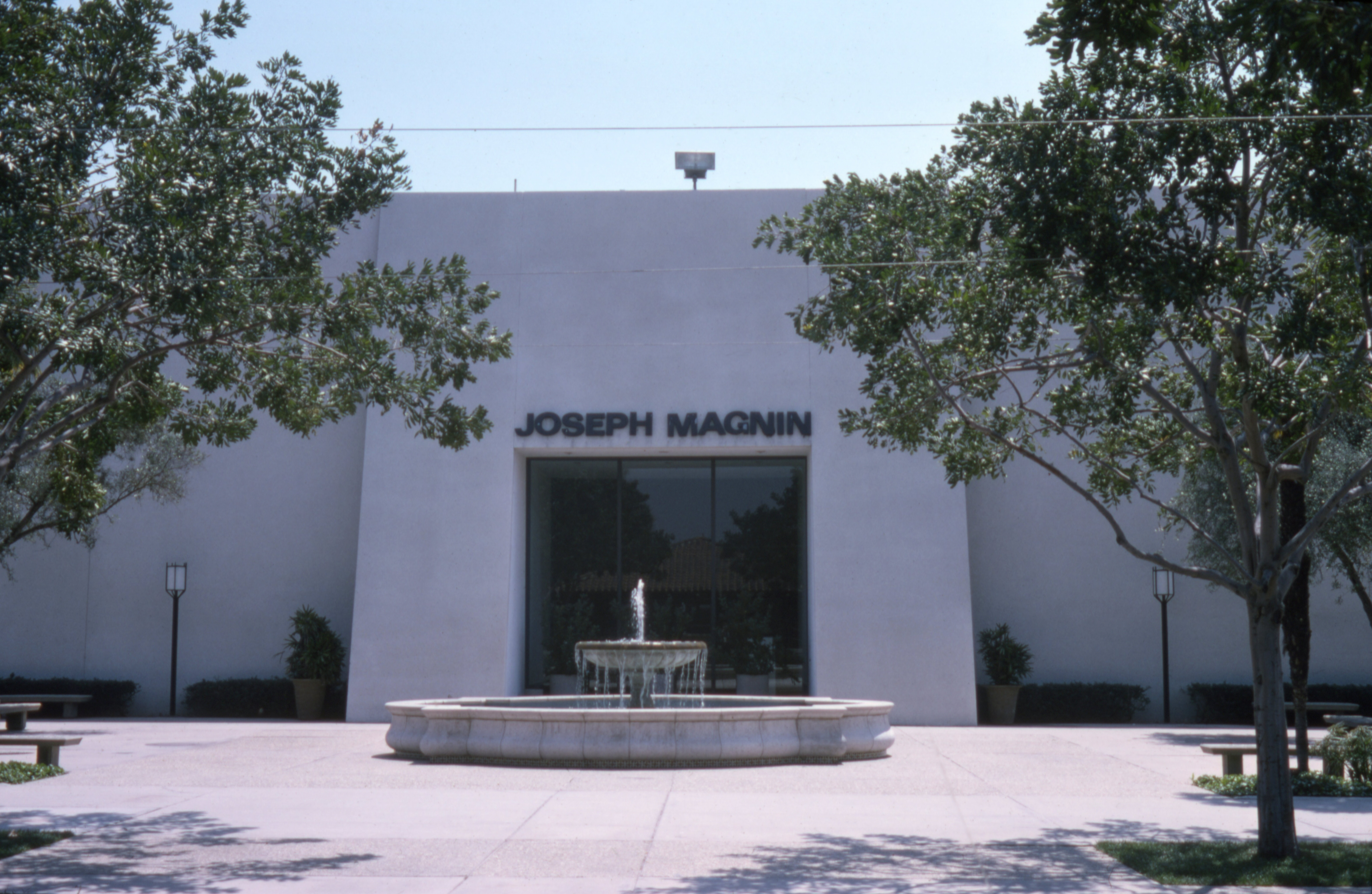
Historic photo of the Joseph Magnin department store, La Habra Fashion Square

The Joseph Magnin Company was a high-end specialty department store founded in San Francisco, California, by Joseph Magnin, 4th son of Isaac Magnin founder of the I. Magnin department store. Joseph Magnin Co. and I. Magnin Co. were rivals.

== History ==
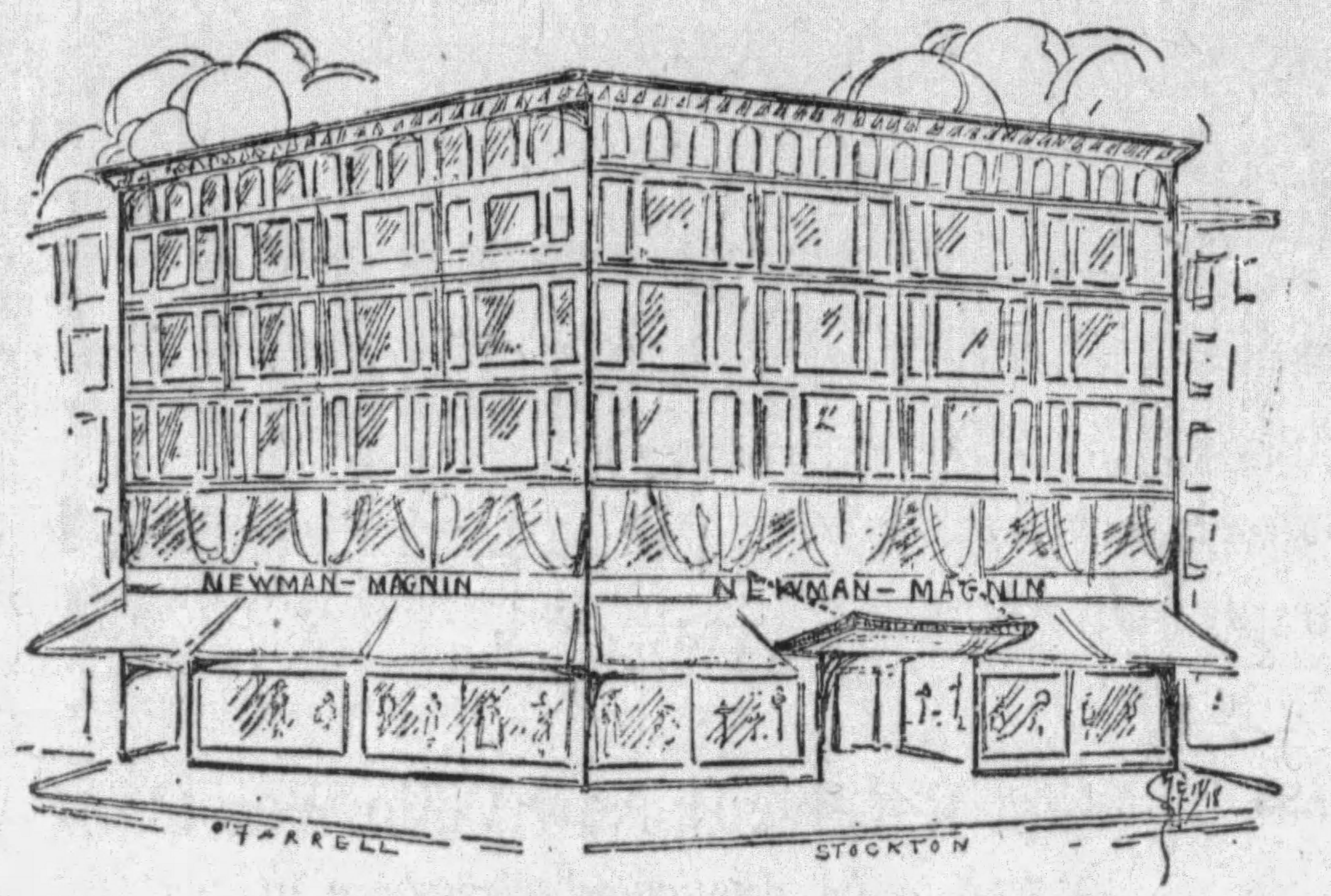
Newman-Magnin store in 1918

In 1913, Joseph Magnin left I. Magnin & Co. and bought into a partnership of the Newman-Levinson store, which changed its name to Newman-Magnin and in 1919 to Joseph Magnin Co.

The store was located at the corner of Stockton and O'Farrell Streets. At the time, I. Magnin Co. was located at Grant and Geary Streets. However in 1948 when I. Magnin built the new flagship store at Stockton and Geary streets, the two flagship stores were less than a block apart. Initially Joseph Magnin was a midrange purveyor of apparel and millinery and was viewed as a second-rate I. Magnin. Within the garment industry, Joseph Magnin Co. was known as "the other Magnin". For many years Joseph Magnin Co. operated in the shadows of I. Magnin. I. Magnin had many established providers of better fashions and demanded exclusivity. Vendors were barred from selling to Joseph Magnin if they wished to continue to do business with I. Magnin. To partially address this, Joseph Magnin rented the vacant 4th floor of the Stockton/O'Farrell store for a number of years to newly emerging local talent, the designer/manufacturer Eleanor Green, for her design studio and factory.

Joseph Magnin at times did use consumer confusion on the Magnin name to their advantage by calling the store J. Magnin in signage, advertisements, and store bags. The store also self identified as JM.

=== Post-war era ===
After World War II, under the leadership of Joseph's son Cyril Magnin, the Joseph Magnin Co. went more upscale and began courting the younger woman's market. JM advertisements were distinctive as being glamorous, sophisticated, trendy and youthful. One newspaper ad went to print without the Magnin name. Cyril was furious until he was told the item had sold out since everyone knew it was a JM ad. Marilyn Monroe purchased the suit she wore when she married Joe DiMaggio in 1954 at JM. As of 1960 the store was one of the first in San Francisco to employ Asian-Americans in customer service.

In 1967, JM was responsible for buying Lynda Bird Johnson's trousseau.

The store also included the "Wolves' Den" department for men only. Men could shop in a clublike area while seated, served martinis, smoking cigars, and being shown merchandise by JM's most attractive women.

=== Sale and Demise ===
In 1969, Cyril Magnin arranged for the Joseph Magnin Co. to be purchased by Amfac, Inc. of Hawaii. Amfac owned Liberty House, among other stores on the West Coast and Hawaii. Cyril remained the chairman of the board of JM. Joseph Magnin grew to a chain of 32 stores. In 1977, Amfac sold Joseph Magnin Co. to investors led by the Hillman Company and Gibbons, Green & Rice. Hillman sold the stores in 1982; in 1984, Joseph Magnin Co. filed for bankruptcy and closed its stores.

== South Coast Plaza store ==
The two-story Joseph Magnin store in South Coast Plaza, in Orange County, California, (branch #30), opened in the mall's Carousel Court on March 14, 1968. This store was notable for its original architect, Frank Gehry, and the architects and designers who worked on its 1979 renovation. Architects Massimo and Lella Vignelli, and Gere Kavanaugh designed some of the store interiors, including the in-store restaurant, Le Soupçon, which featured a plethora of market umbrellas. The renovation was a poster child of then-CEO Edward Gorman's effort to "breathe new life" into its stores at the end of the 1970s. The Los Angeles Times remarked: "The Costa Mesa store--remodeled and reopened last month, is that prototype. Its 27,000 square feet (2,500 m^{2}) were designed … to reflect JM's focus on the unique and contemporary, with shelf units, counters, even dressing rooms on wheels for flexibility in arranging merchandise, lighting on interchangeable ceiling tracks, and a "meandering" path laid out through the departments instead of in the standard grid pattern."

== Branches ==
Joseph Magnin had as many as 49 stores at one point, and 24 by the time of bankruptcy and closure.

Stores included:

=== San Francisco ===
- Stockton at O'Farrell at Union Square
- Three Embarcadero Center
- Montgomery at Bush
- Fox Plaza
- Stonestown Galleria
- Fox Plaza, Civic Center area

=== Rest of the San Francisco Bay Area ===
- San Mateo, East 4th Ave. at San Mateo Dr.
- Palo Alto, Stanford Shopping Center
- San Jose, Valley Fair
- San Jose, Eastridge
- Oakland, Kaiser Center
- Berkeley, 2560 Bancroft Way
- Hayward, Southland Mall
- Walnut Creek, Broadway Plaza
- Concord, Sun Valley
- Santa Rosa, Coddingtown Mall

=== Sacramento metropolitan area ===
- Downtown Plaza
- Florin Center
- Country Club Centre
- Citrus Heights, Sunrise Mall

=== Other Northern California ===
- Carmel Plaza
- Modesto

=== Southern California ===
- Airport Marina Hotel (a.k.a. Amfac Hotel), Lincoln Bl. at Manchester Ave., Westchester near LAX
- Broadway Plaza (now "The Bloc"), Downtown Los Angeles
- Canoga Park, Topanga Plaza
- Century City Shopping Center
- Glendale: Glendale Fashion Center (opened 1966) Later, Joseph Magnin moved to the Glendale Galleria and in 1979 a local retailer, Webb's, expanded into its space.
- Glendale Galleria
- Marina del Rey
- Santa Barbara
- Sherman Oaks Fashion Square
- Torrance, Del Amo Fashion Square
- Costa Mesa (Orange County), South Coast Plaza (opened March 14, 1968; see previous section for detailed history)
- La Habra Fashion Square (opened August 10, 1968, 19,500 square feet (1,810 m^{2}))
- Palm Springs, Desert Fashion Plaza - (opened 1969, 26,000 square feet (2,400 m^{2})). (see also History of retail in Palm Springs)
- San Diego, Fashion Valley (opened 1969)
- Ventura, Buenaventura Center

=== Nevada ===
- Crystal Bay, Lake Tahoe, Cal-Neva
- Stateline, Lake Tahoe, Crescent V shopping center
- Reno, Meadowood Mall
- Reno, Park Lane Centre (opened November 1966, 21,000 square feet (2,000 m^{2}))
- Las Vegas, Fashion Show Mall

=== Denver ===
- Cherry Creek Shopping Center
- Cinderella City
- Downtown Denver, 16th & Stout

=== Elsewhere ===
- Salt Lake City, Utah, ZCMI Center Mall
- Honolulu, Kahala Mall
- Honolulu, Amfac Center, now Topa Financial Center
- Aiea, Hawaii, Pearlridge Mall
