= Sages Complete Market =

American supermarket chain in California

Sage's Complete Markets
- Company type: Private
- Industry: Grocery store
- Founder: Milton R. Sage
- Defunct: 1973
- Headquarters: San Bernardino, California
- Number of locations: 7
- Products: Bakery, dairy, deli, general grocery, drug, coffee shop, meat, produce, toys

Sage's Complete Markets was a privately held supermarket chain, based in San Bernardino, California, consisting of 7 stores located throughout Southern California.

== Stores ==
Sages Del Rosa 1630 Highland Ave in San Bernardino on December 3, 1956

Sages Redlands, 450 Cypress Redlands November 1, 1959

Sages Magnolia 6491 Magnolia Ave Riverside 1951 remodeled in 1962.
