= Wilshire Center, Los Angeles =

Wilshire Center
- Neighborhood of Los Angeles
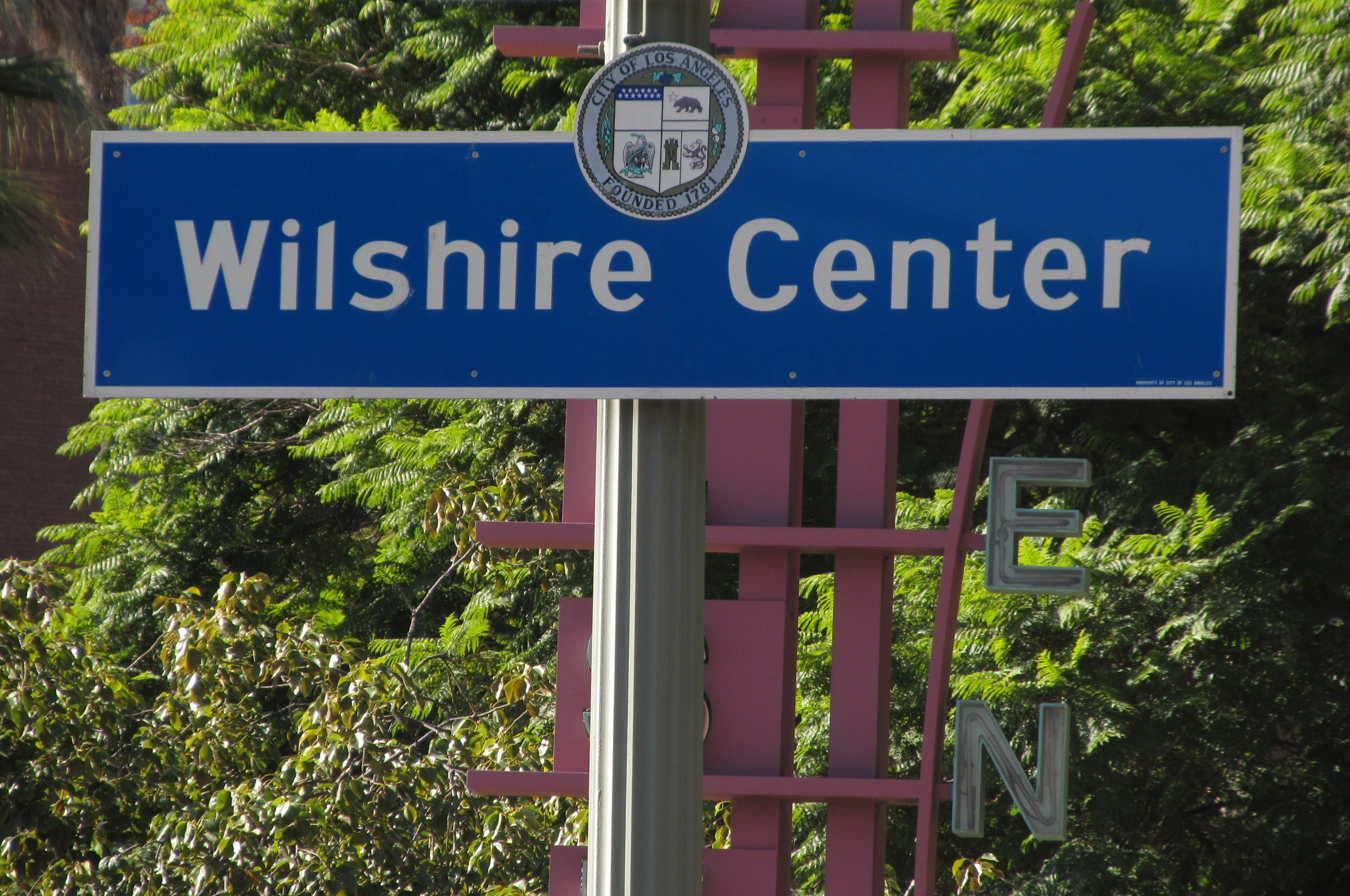
- Wilshire Center neighborhood sign located at the intersection of Wilshire Boulevard and Hoover Street

- Location within Los Angeles
- Coordinates: 34°03′34″N 118°17′55″W
- Country: United States of America
- State: California
- County: Los Angeles
- Time zone: Pacific
- Zip Code: 90006
- Area code: 213

Wilshire Center is a neighborhood in the Central region of Los Angeles, California.

== Geography ==
Wilshire Center is roughly bounded by Melrose Avenue on the north, Virgil Avenue and Hoover Street on the east, Wilton Place and Crenshaw Boulevard on the west, and Koreatown and part of Harvard Heights to the south.

The area was historically known as part of the Wilshire District. As the Wilshire area expanded westward, neighborhood names emerged to distinguish parts of the district from each other.

Wilshire Center includes some of the Wilshire CPA's oldest streetcar suburbs dating to the early 20th century. Historic Preservation Overlay Zones within Wilshire Center include Wilshire Park and Country Club Park.

Within the neighborhood, the "Wilshire Center Regional Commercial Center" (as defined in the city's general plan) is generally bounded by 3rd Street on the north, 8th Street on the south, Hoover Street on the east, and Wilton Place on the west. Google Maps uses the general boundaries of the Regional Commercial Center for the neighborhood. Services provided by the business improvement district are limited to the commercial area between Wilton Place, Hoover Street, Third Street and Eighth Street.

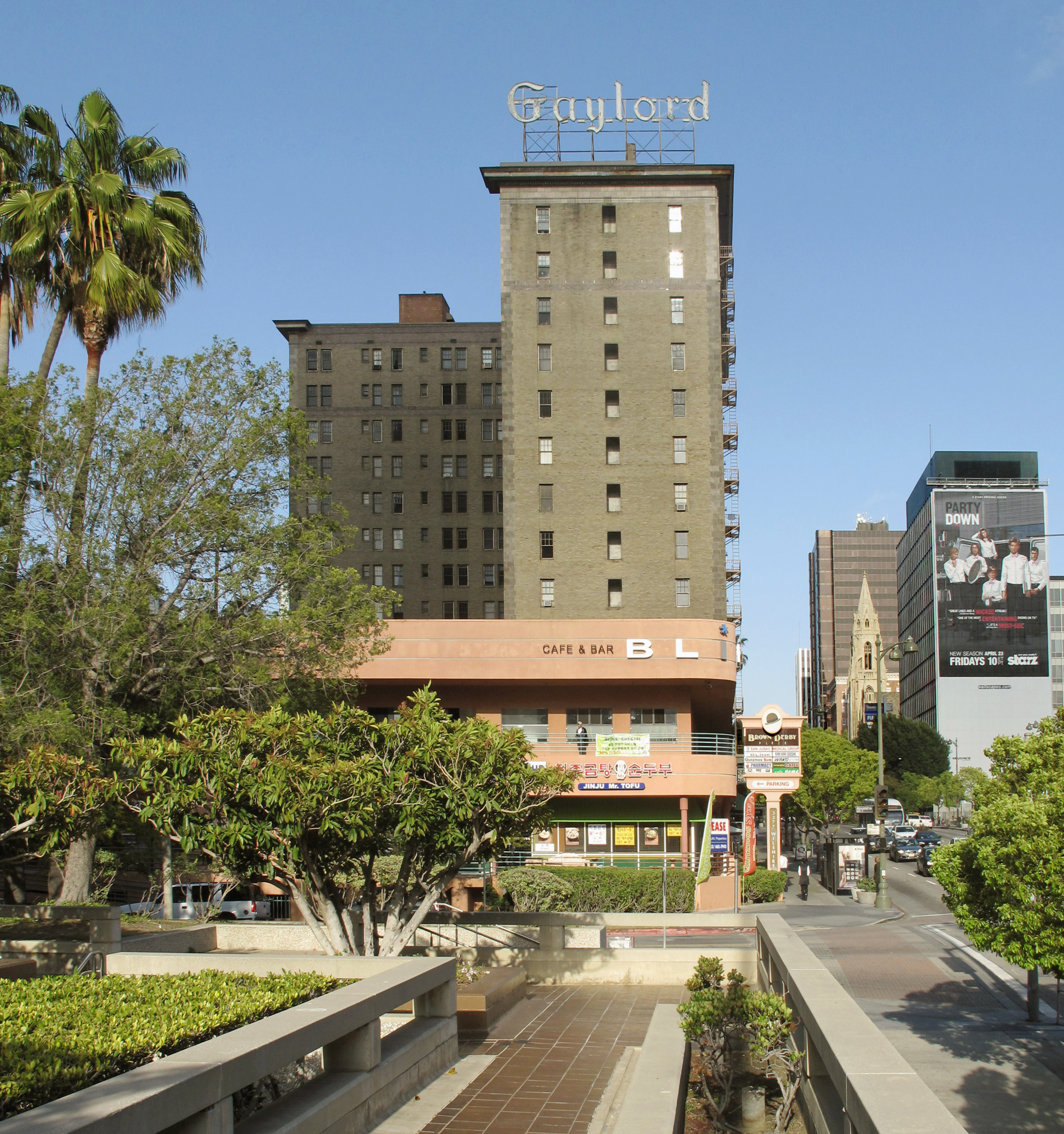
Gaylord Hotel and Wilshire Boulevard in Wilshire Center

== History ==
Wilshire Boulevard is named for Henry Gaylord Wilshire—a millionaire who in 1895 began developing a 35-acre (140,000 m^{2}) parcel stretching westward from Westlake Park (MacArthur Park) for an elite residential subdivision. A socialist, Wilshire donated to the city a strip of land for a boulevard on the conditions that it would be named for him and ban public transit, railroad lines, and commercial or industrial trucking and freight trains.

A Los Angeles Times overview of the area referred to "the corridor's former glory as a haven for blue-chip corporations and fine shopping."

In the early 1900s, steam-driven motorcars started sharing Wilshire Boulevard with horse-drawn carriages. At the turn of the century, Germain Pellissier raised sheep and barley between Normandie and Western Avenues. Reuben Schmidt purchased land east of Normandie for his dairy farm.

In the mid-1990s, it had a reputation for "crime and grime," and many businesses had left the area, but by 2001 it had recovered. The Los Angeles Times noted that: "Another sign of the district's popularity emerged this summer with the opening of a plush, $35-million spa, mall and golf complex called Aroma Wilshire Center just east of Western Avenue that caters to the city's affluent Korean population, many of them entrepreneurs who own businesses in the area."

=== Apartment buildings ===
Distinguished high-rise apartment buildings and hotels were erected along Wilshire Boulevard. The lavish Ambassador Hotel was built in 1921 on 23 acres (93,000 m^{2}) of the former site of Reuben Schmidt's dairy farm. In approximately 1929, the Academy Awards ceremony was moved from the Hollywood Roosevelt Hotel to the Ambassador Hotel. It closed in 1989 and, despite efforts of historic preservationists, has been demolished. The site is owned by the Los Angeles Unified School District, which in 2010 opened the Robert F. Kennedy Community Schools and a small park on the site. It is the most expensive public school in the United States.

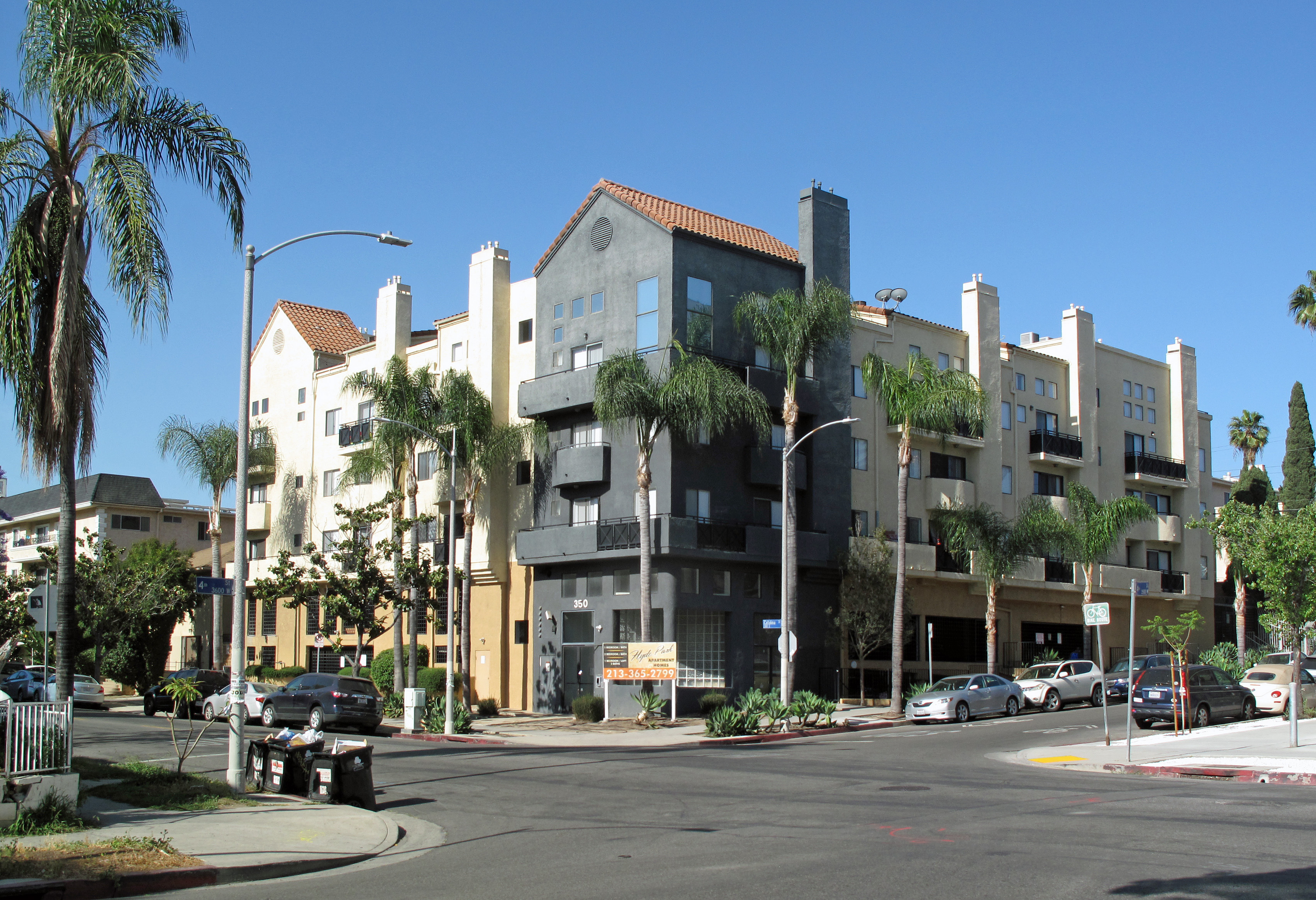
Typical side street apartments at 4th and Catalina

The area nearby became the site of elegant New York-style apartment buildings such as the Asbury, the Langham, the Fox Normandie, the Picadilly, the Talmadge (after Norma Talmadge), the Gaylord, and the Windsor. Many film stars lived in these buildings.

As of 2021, a building boom fueled by density bonuses and the City of Los Angeles's Transit-Oriented Community incentives has increased the supply of apartments and condominiums in the area, and older office buildings have been converted into apartments and condos. Large apartment buildings have been constructed at the Metro stops at Wilshire/Western and Wilshire/Vermont.

=== Commercial ===
Gloria Swanson's husband, Herbert Somborn, opened the Brown Derby Restaurant, a hat-shaped building at Wilshire and Alexandria, in 1926. The hat now sits on top of a restaurant in a mini-mall.

In 1929, the elegant Art-Deco Bullocks Wilshire was built at Wilshire and Westmoreland as the city's first branch department store in the suburbs. It closed in 1993 and now houses the library of Southwestern Law School.

A section of Germain Pellessier's sheep farm became the site of the Pellessier Building and Wiltern Theatre, which began construction at the corner of Wilshire and Western in 1929. The theater, operated by Warner Brothers, opened in 1931.

In 1929, the Chapman Market drew motorcars to the world's first drive-through grocery store at Sixth St and Alexandria.

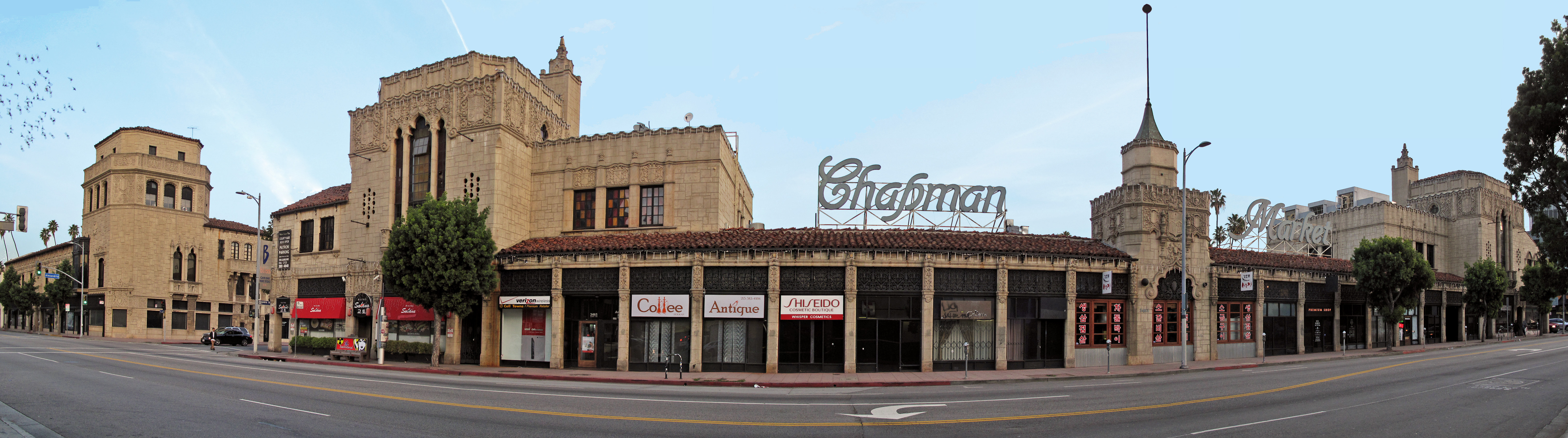
Chapman Market today

The San Francisco-based I. Magnin opened a store in 1939 at Wilshire and New Hampshire.

In 2001, David Y. Lee was the largest landlord in the district, owning 20 buildings comprising about 7 million square feet of space in Mid-Wilshire and three buildings in nearby Park Mile.

=== Office buildings ===
In 1952, on the driving range on the south side of Wilshire between Mariposa and Normandie, the first three 12-story Tishman Plaza buildings were built in 1952 (they're now known as Central Plaza), designed by Claude Beelman.

Insurance companies began locating their West Coast headquarters in Wilshire Center because of tax incentives provided by the State. Some 22 high-rise office buildings were erected on Wilshire Boulevard from 1966 to 1976 to provide office space for such companies as Getty Oil Co., Ahmanson Financial Co., Beneficial Standard Life Insurance, Wausau, and Equitable Life Insurance. The Chapman Park Hotel, built in 1936, was torn down to make way for the 34-story Equitable Plaza office building erected in 1969. By 1970, firms such as CNA, Pacific Indemnity, and Pierce National Life were starting construction of their own high-rise buildings. Southwestern University School of Law moved from its downtown location of 50 years to a four-story campus just south of Wilshire Boulevard on Westmoreland in 1973.

In the 1970s and 1980s, commerce moved to the city's less congested Westside as well as the San Fernando Valley, and businesses and affluent residents eventually followed. I. Magnin closed, while Bullocks Wilshire held out until 1993. Rental rates in office buildings plummeted from an average of $1.65/sq ft to a dollar between 1991 and 1996; property values dropped from a high of $120/sq ft to $30 or $40 per foot in 1998.

Wilshire Center lost most of its remaining original glitter following the 1992 Los Angeles riots and the 1994 Northridge earthquake.

Subsequently, the Wilshire Center Streetscape Project used federal funds to rejuvenate Wilshire Boulevard. It was one of the most ambitious and significant urban rehabilitation projects found anywhere in America and in 1999 was awarded the Lady Bird Johnson Award from The National Arbor Day Foundation.

== Government ==
- The community is served by the Wilshire Center/Koreatown Neighborhood Council.
- Pio Pico–Koreatown branch of the Los Angeles Public Library - 694 S Oxford Avenue.

== Education ==
The Los Angeles Unified School District operates the following public schools in the neighborhood:

- Wilton Place Elementary School -745 S Wilton Place
- Burroughs Middle School - 600 McCadden Place

== Religion ==
- Wilshire Christian Church - 634 South Normandie Avenue. It was the first church on Wilshire Boulevard in 1911.

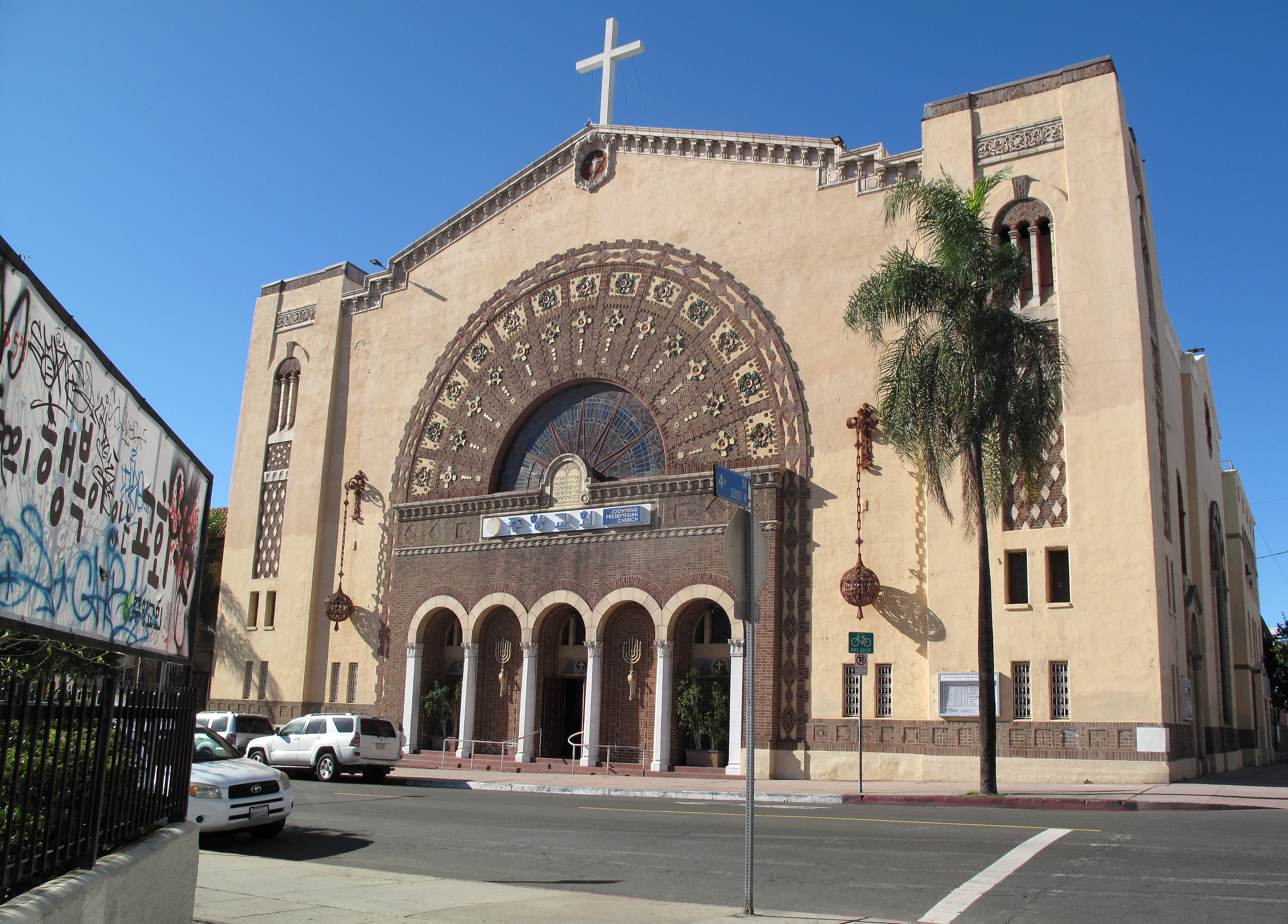
Korean Philadelphia Presbyterian Church

- Korean Philadelphia Presbyterian Church - 407 S. New Hampshire Avenue. Formerly the Sinai Congregation.
- The Los Angeles Korean Methodist Church - 433 S Normandie Avenue. Formerly a Christian Science congregation
- Immanuel Presbyterian Church - 3300 Wilshire Boulevard.
- First Congregational Church of Los Angeles - 540 S Commonwealth Avenue.
- St. James Episcopal Church - 3903 Wilshire Boulevard.
- First Baptist Church of Los Angeles - 760 South Westmoreland Avenue.
- St. Basil Catholic Church - 3611 Wilshire Boulevard
- Founder's Church of Religious Science - 3281 W 6th Street.
- Wilshire Boulevard Temple - 3663 Wilshire Boulevard.
- The Islamic Center of Southern California - 434 Vermont Avenue.

== Transportation ==
Wilshire Center is served by city buses, including several Metro Rapid lines, and three subway stations along Wilshire Boulevard. The Metro D Line, which begins at Union Station in Downtown Los Angeles, has stations at Vermont Ave., Normandie Ave., and Western Ave., at which it currently terminates. An extension of the D Line subway under Wilshire Boulevard to Westwood is scheduled for completion in 2027. The Vermont station is also served by the Metro B Line, which continues north through Hollywood to North Hollywood.

== See also ==
- Harold A. Henry, Los Angeles City Council president active in improving Wilshire Center
- List of Los Angeles Historic-Cultural Monuments in the Wilshire and Westlake areas
