= Mary Ann Magnin =

Dutch-American businesswoman

- Born: Mary Ann Cohen; 1850; Scheveningen, The Hague, the Netherlands
- Died: December 15, 1943 (aged 93); San Francisco, California, U.S.
- Resting place: Hills of Eternity Memorial Park, Colma, California, US
- Occupation: Businesswoman
- Spouse: Isaac Magnin
- Children: 8
- Relatives: Edgar Magnin (grandson); Cyril Magnin (grandson); Mae Brussell (great granddaughter)

Mary Ann Magnin (1850–1943) was a Dutch-American businesswoman. She was the co-founder of I. Magnin, an upscale "specialty store" in San Francisco, California.

== Early life ==
Mary Ann Cohen was born in 1850 in Scheveningen, The Hague, the Netherlands. Her father was a rabbi. She immigrated to England with her parents, settling in London, where she grew up.

== Career ==
In the wake of the California Gold Rush, she decided to immigrate to the West coast of the United States with her husband and children. They arrived in San Francisco in 1875, traveling via Cape Horn. She established a clothing store in Oakland, where she sold baby clothes, lingerie, and bridal trousseaux. Two years later, in 1877, she moved the business to a larger store in San Francisco, and it became known as I. Magnin.

Even though she retired in 1900, she kept visiting her store daily until her death.

== Personal life ==
She married Isaac Magnin on October 8, 1865, at the Great Synagogue of London. She was only fifteen years old. They had eight children: Samuel, Henrietta, Joseph, Emanuel John, Victor, Lucille, Flora, and Grover. They resided at the Saint Francis Hotel on Union Square. San Francisco artist May Slessinger painted miniature portraits of Mary Ann Magnin and her son Grover.

== Death ==
She died on December 15, 1943, in San Francisco, California. She was ninety-three years old. She is buried at Hills of Eternity Memorial Park in Colma, California.
