= Isaac Magnin =

- Born: Isaac Moeijen; 1842; Assen or Groningen, the Netherlands
- Died: January 27, 1907 (aged 65); San Francisco, California, U.S.
- Resting place: Hills of Eternity Memorial Park, Colma, California, US
- Spouse: Mary Ann Cohen
- Relatives: Edgar Magnin (grandson); Cyril Magnin (grandson); Mae Brussell (great granddaughter)

Isaac Magnin (1842–1907) was a Dutch-born American businessperson, carver and gilder. He was the co-founder of I. Magnin, an upscale women's clothing store in San Francisco, California.

== Early life ==
Isaac Magnin (or Moeijen) was born into a Jewish family in Assen or Groningen, the Netherlands in 1842. His father was from Russia and his mother, Dutch-born. He moved to the United States with his parents when he was eight years old.

== Career ==
He worked as a businessman in Texas and New Mexico. During the American Civil War of 1861–1865, he served in the Union Army. He then worked as a pushcart peddler in New Orleans, Louisiana. Next, he moved to London, where he established an arts goods store. A decade later, in 1876, he set sail for San Francisco via Cape Horn, with his wife and children. There, he worked as a frame carver and gilder for Solomon Gump, an art and antique dealer and owner of Gump's. By 1880, he was listed in the census as the keeper of a fancy bazaar. With his wife, he was also the co-founder of I. Magnin, an upscale women's clothing store in San Francisco.

He was interested in socialism.

== Personal life ==
He married Mary Ann Cohen on October 8, 1865, at the Great Synagogue of London. They had eight children: Samuel, Henrietta, Joseph, Emanuel John, Victor, Lucille, Flora, and Grover. They attended the Temple Emanu-El in San Francisco.

He was a freemason, having joined in London and gone up the ranks in California. Magnin lived at 1478–1482 Page Street, San Francisco, and his two daughters lived in the attached unit, the building was designed by Newsom and Newsom.

== Death ==
He died on January 27, 1907, in San Francisco, California. He is buried at Hills of Eternity Memorial Park in Colma, California.
