= I. Magnin =

American luxury department store chain

I Magnin
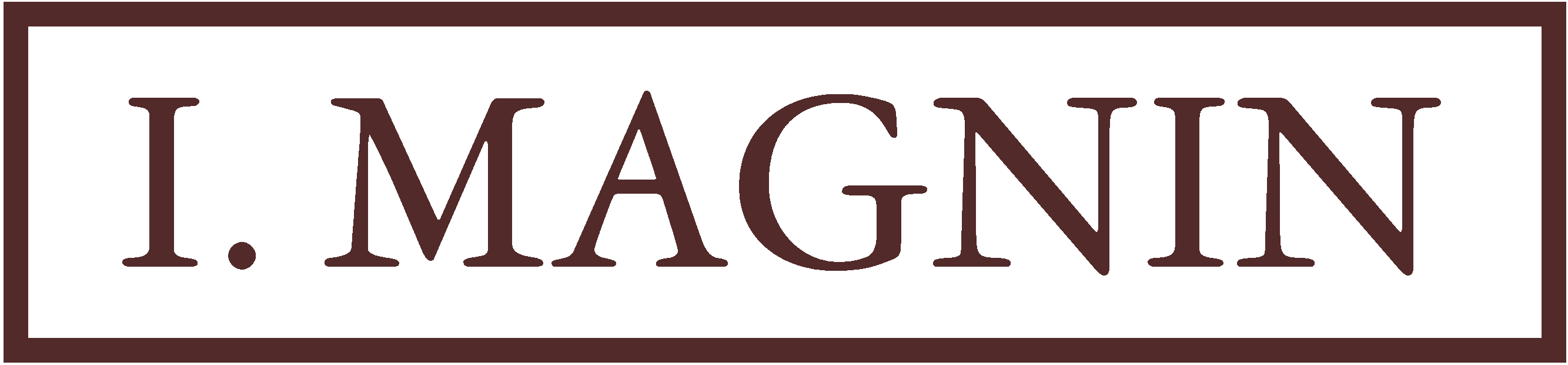
- Type: Private
- Industry: Retail
- Founded: 1876; 150 years ago
- Founders: Mary Ann Magnin; Isaac Magnin
- Defunct: 1994
- Fate: Acquired by Macy's
- Successor: Macy's
- Headquarters: San Francisco, California, U.S.
- Key people: Mary Ann Magnin; Isaac Magnin
- Products: Clothing, footwear, jewelry, beauty products
- Owner: Federated Department Stores (1964–1988, 1994); R. H. Macy & Co. (1988–1994)

I. Magnin & Company was a San Francisco, California, based high fashion and specialty goods luxury department store. Over the course of its existence, it expanded across the West into Southern California and the adjoining states of Arizona, Oregon, and Washington. In the 1970s, under Federated Department Stores ownership, the chain entered the Chicago, and Washington, D.C., metropolitan areas. Mary Ann Magnin founded the company in 1876 and named the chain after her husband Isaac.

== History ==
=== Beginnings ===
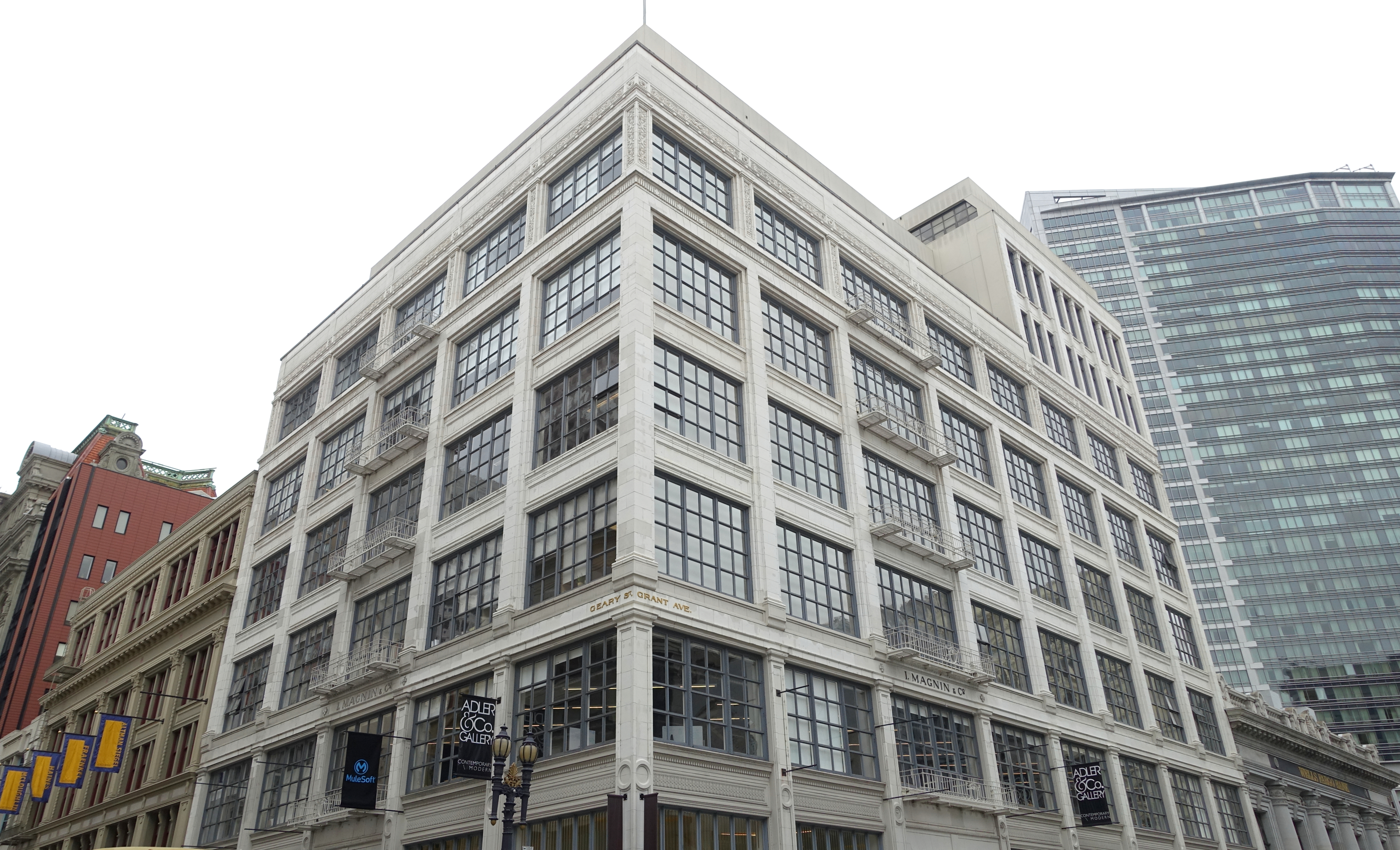
San Francisco store at 50 Grant Avenue, 1912 to 1948

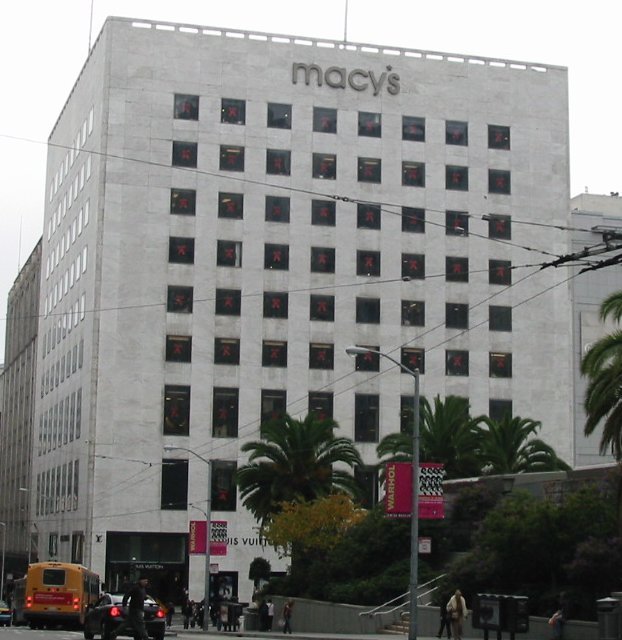
San Francisco store on Union Square, 1948 to 1994

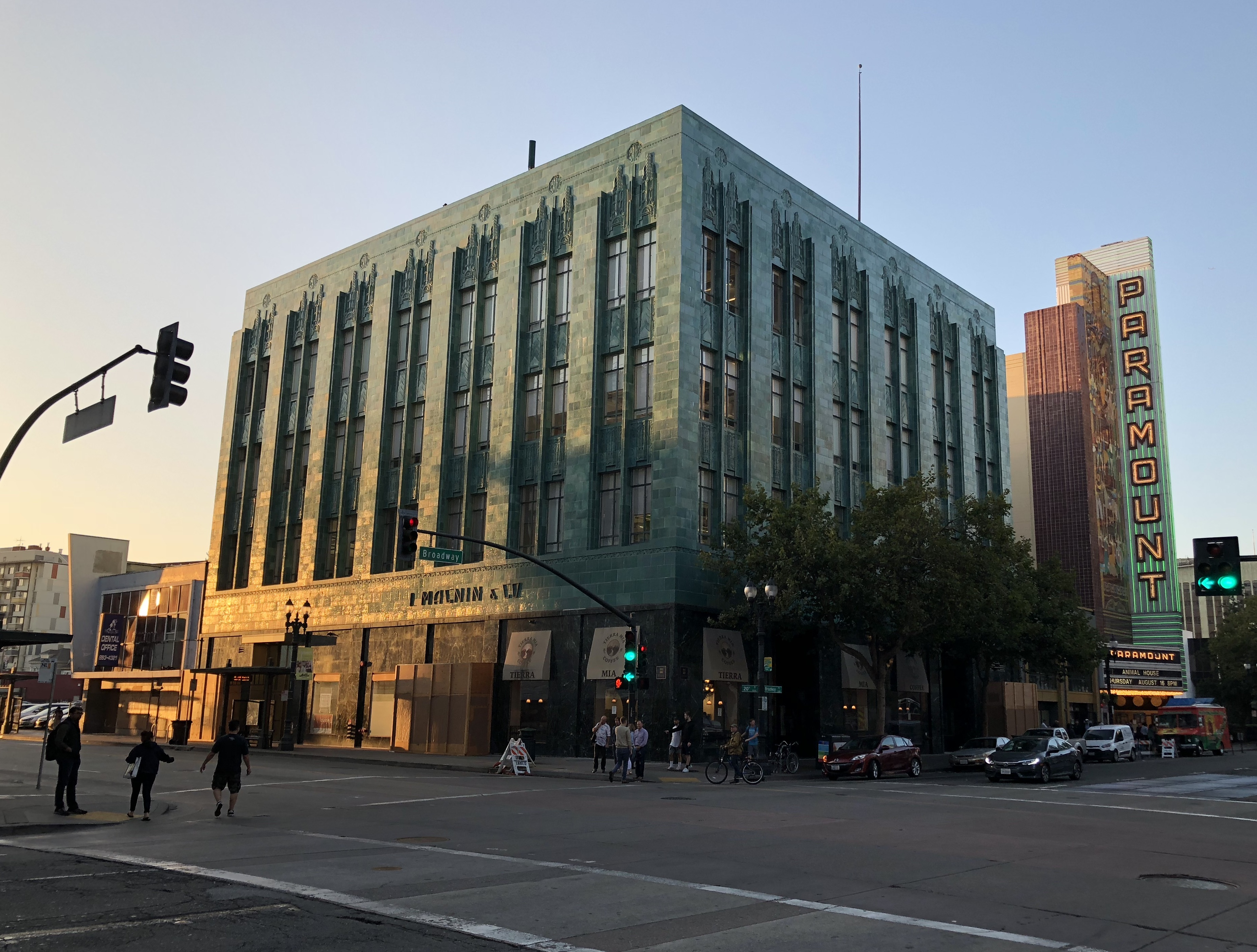
Former I. Magnin store in Oakland, California

In the early 1870s, Dutch-born Mary Ann Magnin and her husband Isaac Magnin left England and settled in San Francisco. Mary Ann opened a shop in 1876 selling lotions and high-end clothing for infants. Later, she expanded into bridal wear. As her business grew, her exclusive clientele relied on her for the newest fashions from Paris. In the 20th century I. Magnin imported clothing by major designers including Jeanne Lanvin, Hattie Carnegie, and Christian Dior.

At the turn of the century, Mary Ann's four sons entered the business. While John, Grover, and Sam became associated with the I. Magnin store, the fourth son, Joseph, became known for his own store, Joseph Magnin Co.

The 1906 earthquake and fire leveled the San Francisco store with the remainder of the downtown area. The store reopened in new quarters at 50 Grant Avenue at Geary Boulevard in 1912. During the 1910s, the chain opened shops in six high-end hotels in California. The Los Angeles Wilshire Boulevard branch (opened in 1939) and the Union Square store (opened in 1948) were among the most elegant in the United States. When designer Christian Dior visited, he toured the Union Square store, and called it the "White Marble Palace".

==== In Los Angeles ====
Daughter Flora married Myer Siegel, who launched a namesake department store in Los Angeles, which would later become a chain. In Los Angeles in 1897 and 1898, I. Magnin & Co. advertised its wares for retail sale at 237 South Spring Street, noting that Mr. Myer Siegel was the manager. The I. Magnin store that Siegel managed moved to 251 S. Broadway on January 2, 1899; on June 19, 1904, I. Magnin announced that the Los Angeles store would henceforth be known as "Myer Siegel". I. Magnin would return with its own Los Angeles-area retail store later when it opened boutiques in the Maryland Hotel in Pasadena and the Ambassador Hotel in Mid-Wilshire, a branch at 6340 Hollywood Boulevard, and in 1939 a landmark store at 3240 Wilshire Boulevard near Bullocks Wilshire, designed by Myron Hunt, architect of the Ambassador Hotel.

=== Sale to Bullock's ===
In 1944, the chain was bought by the Los Angeles-based Bullock's department store chain. In the late 1950s the combined chain expanded into the Southern California suburbs by opening the Fashion Square concept in Santa Ana in 1958, the San Fernando Valley (Sherman Oaks) in 1962 and Del Amo (Torrance) in 1965.

After a major proxy battle in 1964, Bullocks-I. Magnin was merged into Federated Department Stores. Bullock's, I. Magnin, and eventually Bullocks Wilshire were run as separate divisions of Federated. I. Magnin expanded in the Chicago and Washington, D.C. areas in the 1970s.

=== Sale to Macy's ===
R.H. Macy & Company had long yearned in the 1980s to enter the Southern California market. Along with trying to build their own stores, they attempted to purchase Federated, eventually losing a takeover war to the Campeau Corporation in 1988. As part of the settlement with Campeau, Macy's purchased Bullock's, Bullock's Wilshire and I. Magnin, subsequently beginning a reorganization of its divisions and consolidating the I. Magnin and Bullock's Wilshire stores into a semi-autonomous division under Macy's California. The seven Bullock's Wilshire stores were renamed I. Magnin in 1989.

In 1991 Macy's announced plans to re-align its divisional structure and created a new Macy's West/Bullock's division by February 1992. While in the process of doing so, it declared bankruptcy on January 27, 1992. During the next two years, the I. Magnin group shuttered 11 stores of an already-reduced franchise with the historic original Bullock's Wilshire flagship on Wilshire Boulevard closed in early 1993 after months of losses aggravated by the effects of the 1992 Rodney King riots. The Oakland, California, store was closed in 1995.

=== Liquidation ===
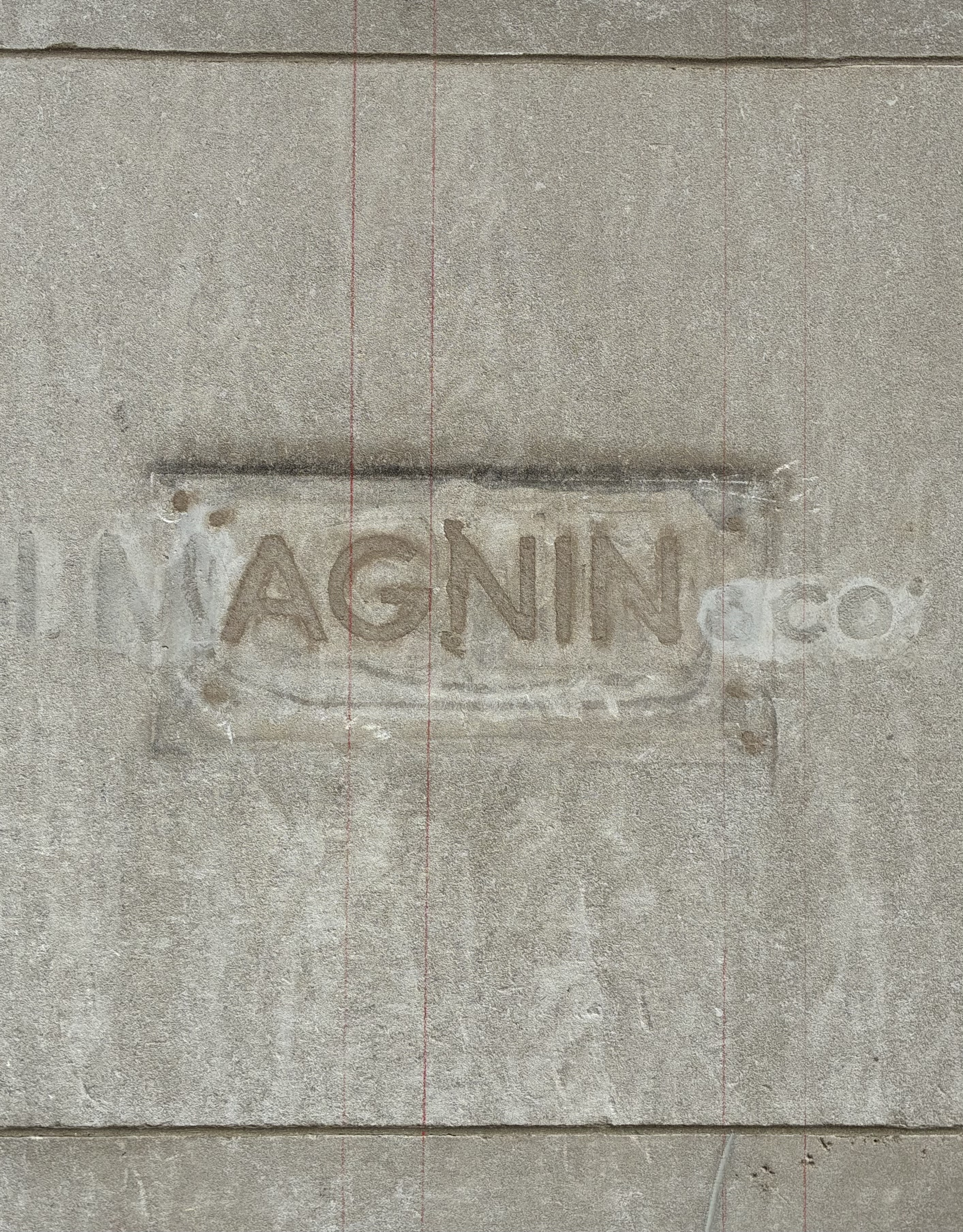
Façade of former I. Magnin store at Michigan Avenue in Chicago

In 1994 Federated Department Stores reached an agreement with R.H. Macy's creditors to buy the company out of bankruptcy, completing the acquisition on December 19 and making Macy's West/Bullock's a division of Federated. Even before the acquisition closed, it pulled the plug on the remainder of the I. Magnin chain, eventually selling four stores (Carmel, Beverly Hills, San Diego, and Phoenix) to Saks Fifth Avenue and ultimately converting six former I. Magnin locations in Palo Alto, Walnut Creek, Woodland Hills, Palm Desert, Newport Beach, and Palos Verdes to specialty Macy's or Bullock's locations, replicating the success of the 1991 conversion of I. Magnin at South Coast Plaza in Costa Mesa, California, into a separate Bullock's Men's location. The upper floors of the former I. Magnin store on Union Square were later converted to an expansion of Macy's Union Square, Macy's West's own adjoining flagship.

== Store locations ==
City	Location	Opened	Closed	Became	Notes
San Francisco single-store locations and flagship stores
San Francisco	144 Third Street				operating in 1885
San Francisco	848 Market opposite Fourth	1887?	Oct 1895		1887 ad refers to "Magnin's Pacific Underwear House"
San Francisco	840 Market opposite Fourth	Oct 1894	1901		
San Francisco	Baldwin Block, 918-920-922 Market	Mar 11, 1901	Apr 17, 1906		"Almost 10,000" sq. ft. of floor space. Had a 2nd entrance on Ellis Street. Damaged in 1906 San Francisco Earthquake.
San Francisco	Van Ness at Bush	1906			Temporary store after 1906 San Francisco Earthquake
San Francisco	Post at Stockton				The second floor was a "French room" for "costumes and wraps" with Circassian walnut finishes and hard-carved lattice glass doors. An annex of several thousand square feet for women's millinery (hats) was added on Post Street in 1911. The interior had private hat rooms and was Louis XVI style, with "goblin blue carpets" and "old rose colored" rugs, and cut-glass chandeliers. The second floor had all-mahogany fixtures, with heavy French plate mirrors and was "richly carpeted in green". The mezzanine held a millinery workroom.
San Francisco	50 Geary Street	1912	1948		
San Francisco	135 Stockton Street	1948	1994	Macy's Union Square (1995-2018)	
Early boutiques in hotels
Santa Barbara	Potter Hotel	Jan 6, 1912			Hotel destroyed by fire 1921
Pasadena	Hotel Maryland	1913			
Monterey	Hotel Del Monte	1914			
Coronado	Hotel Del Coronado	1914	1950s? before 1954		
Wilshire Center	Ambassador Hotel, 3400 Wilshire Boulevard	Jan 18, 1921			
Downtown Los Angeles	Biltmore Hotel	1927			
Santa Barbara	Biltmore at Montecito	1927			
Palm Springs	El Mirador Hotel	1932	1942	El Mirador became a military hospital	
Pasadena	Huntington Hotel				was operating in 1947
Arrowhead Springs	Arrowhead Springs Hotel	1953			
Sacramento	Senator Hotel	1953			
Other Northern California stores
Carmel	Carmel Plaza	1960	1994		10,000 sq ft (930 m^{2})
Cupertino	Vallco Fashion Park	1976	1992	Express; later Dynasty Chinese Seafood Restaurant	56,000 sq. ft.
Fresno	1630-1632 Van Ness Avenue	1955			17,000 sq. ft.
Oakland			1994		
Palo Alto	Stanford Shopping Center		1994		
Sacramento	Downtown Plaza	1984	1992	America Live! (shuttered in 1996)	Building originally opened as a Liberty House in 1981.
Santa Clara	Valley Fair Mall				
San Mateo					Converted to clearance store
Walnut Creek			1994		
Southern California stores opened as I. Magnin
Downtown Los Angeles	237 South Spring Street	1897	1898 or -9		
Downtown Los Angeles	237 South Broadway	Jan 2, 1899	Jun 1904	Myer Siegel	
Hollywood	6340 Hollywood Boulevard	Apr 1923			
Pasadena (1st full store)	550 East Colorado Boulevard	1933	Aug 1949		
Beverly Hills (1st store)	9626 Wilshire at Bedford	1928	1947		
Wilshire Center (full store)	3240 Wilshire Boulevard	Feb 10, 1939			Near Bullocks Wilshire. Designed by Myron Hunt, architect of the Ambassador Hotel
Beverly Hills (2nd store)	9634 Wilshire Boulevard	1947	Jan 1995	Saks Fifth Avenue Men's Store	100,000 square feet (9,300 m^{2})
Santa Barbara (full store)	1415 State Street	1947			Timothy L. Pflueger, architect. Now the United States Bankruptcy Court.
Pasadena (2nd full store)	475 S. Lake Avenue	Aug 1949			
San Diego - La Jolla	7661 Girard Avenue	1954	1993	Stores and offices	6,000 sq ft (560 m^{2}) at opening
San Diego–Fashion Valley	Fashion Valley	Sep 26, 1992	1993 or -4	Saks Fifth Avenue, Forever 21	Took over Buffums space. Employees from the to-be-closed La Jolla branch were transferred here. Saks Fifth Avenue relocated its Mission Valley store into the space. Space later divided into six retail slots; Forever 21 took over the building's upper and most of the lower levels.
Santa Ana	Santa Ana Fashion Square	1958			
Sherman Oaks	Sherman Oaks Fashion Square	1962			
Torrance	Del Amo Fashion Square	1965			
Southern California stores opened as Bullocks Wilshire
Wilshire Center	3050 Wilshire Boulevard	Sep 24, 1929	Jan 1995	Southwestern Law School	An architectural and retail landmark. See Bullocks Wilshire
Palm Springs	151 Palm Canyon Drive	Oct 18, 1947 (as Bullock's)	1992		
Palm Desert	Palm Desert Town Center	1987			Took over the space of Bonwit Teller
Woodland Hills	Woodland Hills Promenade	Aug 20, 1973			
Newport Beach	Fashion Island	Aug 1, 1977		Razed, now site of Nordstrom	
La Jolla	La Jolla Village Square			shuttered, mall converted to "power centre"	
Chicago area
Chicago	830 North Michigan Avenue, Magnificent Mile	Oct 22, 1971	February 1991		Building was originally Bonwit Teller; as of July 2020 multi-tenant retail space incl. Uniqlo
Northbrook	Northbrook Court		1991 (est.)		
Oak Brook	Oakbrook Center		1991 (est.)		
Other states
Phoenix	Biltmore Fashion Park		Dec 1994	Saks Fifth Avenue	
North Bethesda, Md. (Washington, D.C. area)	White Flint Mall	Aug 11, 1978	Jun 1992	Borders Books & Music	81,000 square feet (7,500 m^{2}), 150 employees, $10 million to build. Was the 24th I. Magnin store at the time.
Portland, Oregon	930 SW Sixth (Sixth and Salmon)	1962	1988		
Seattle	601 Pine Street (after 1953)	1926	1993		

== See also ==
- I. Magnin Building
- List of department stores converted to Macy's
