= Achard =

Achard is a French surname. During the Middle Ages, it was also a given name from Norman.

As a surname, it may refer to:

- Albert Achard (1894–1972), French World War I flying ace
- Antoine Achard (1696–1772), Swiss Protestant minister
- Claude-François Achard (1751–1809), French physician
- Emile Achard (1860–1944), French physician
- Franz Karl Achard (1753–1821), Prussian chemist
- Gilbert Achard-Picard (1918–1954), French bobsledder
- Guy Achard (born 1936), French Latinist
- Jean Achard (painter) (1807–1884), French painter
- Jean Achard (racing driver) (1918–1951), French race-car driver and journalist
- Julien Alexandre Achard de Bonvouloir (1749–1783), secret French envoy to the American colonies
- Léon Achard (1831–1905), French tenor
- Louis Amédée Achard (1814–1875), French novelist
- Marcel Achard (1899–1974), French playwright
- Michel Jacques François Achard (1778–1865), French general
- Sophie Achard (born 1977), French statistical neuroscientist

As a given name, it may refer to:

- Achard of Saint Victor (c. 1100–1171), cannon regular and bishop
- Count Achard of Lecce, Norman count of Lecce
