= Bancel =

Bancel is a surname. Notable people with the surname include:

- Louis Bancel (theologian) (1628–1685), French Dominican theologian
- Louis Bancel (sculptor) (1926–1978), French sculptor
- Stéphane Bancel (born 1972), French billionaire businessman
