= Louis Bancel =

Louis Bancel may refer to:

- Louis Bancel (theologian) (1628–1685), French Dominican theologian
- Louis Bancel (sculptor) (1926–1978), French sculptor
