= INGOs Conference of the Council of Europe =

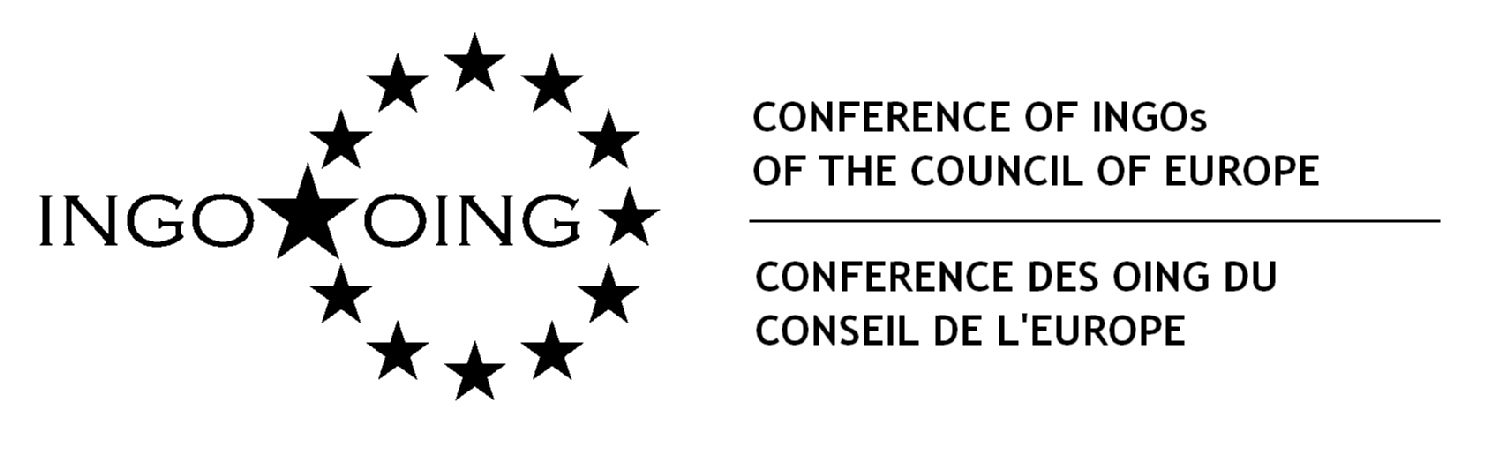
- Founded: 1949
- Founded at: Strasbourg, France
- Headquarters: Strasbourg, France
- Region served: Europe, international
- Key people: Gerhard Ermischer (president)
- Website: www.coe.int/en/web/ingo/home

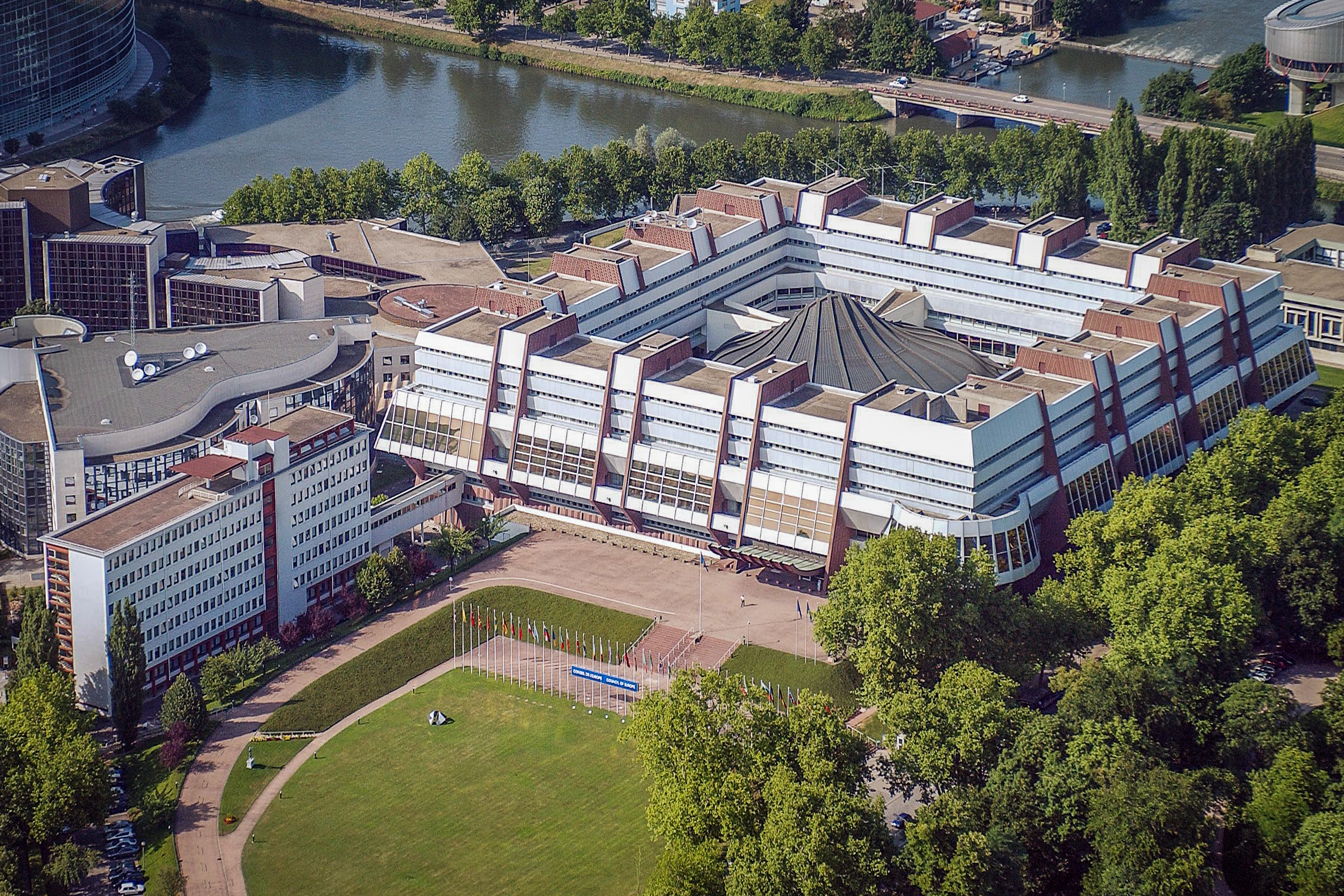
Headquarter of Council of Europe

The INGO (international non-governmental organisations) Conference is the body representing civil society in the Council of Europe, a European organisation founded in 1949. The Council of Europe has 46 member states with some 700 million citizens and its seat is in Strasbourg, France. The current president is Gerhard Ermischer.

The INGO Conference of the Council of Europe is a space for free and innovative participation of committed citizens, offering the possibility to contribute directly to the construction of Europe. It is the only assembly of NGOs playing an institutional role in an international intergovernmental organization.

== History ==
=== First step: Consultative status ===
At its 8th session, in May 1951, the Committee of Ministers stated that it "may, on behalf of the Council of Europe, make suitable arrangements for consultation with international non-governmental Organisations which deal with matters that are within the competence of the Council of Europe" (Resolution (51) 30Fe). In October 1972, it adopted the "Rules for Consultative Status" for INGOs (Resolution (72) 35).

The Secretary General of the Council of Europe Georg Kahn-Ackermann increased the cooperation with the INGOs and suggested that they should get organised among themselves. This led to establishing in January 1976 the Liaison Committee, a body made up of 17 INGOs elected by the "Plenary Conference of the INGOs enjoying consultative status with the Council of Europe". In 1979, the Committee of Ministers decided to establish, within the Directorate of Political Affairs, a secretariat for the Liaison Committee and to put interpretation and meeting rooms at the disposal of the INGOs. In order to finance the collective work the Liaison Committee set up, in 1995, the association "INGO Service" to receive voluntary financial contributions from INGOs. The Committee of Ministers supported this initiative by contributing 15 000 FF (10’€200 in 2009).

In 1991 the Plenary Conference of INGOs set up "groupings" in order to enable the INGOs to work collectively on specific thematic issues and to reinforce their cooperation with the directions concerned, often allowing for more synergy among them.

In order to make the cooperation with the INGOs more flexible and easy, and at the same time, to strengthen the conditions set for obtaining the consultative status, the Committee of Ministers adopted, in October 1993, a new resolution "on relations between the Council of Europe and the international non-governmental organisations" (Resolution (93) 38).

In October 2001, the Ministers' Deputies decided "to examine possibilities to adapt the Committee of Ministers Resolution (93)38 on relations between the Council of Europe and international non-governmental organisations in order that the Council may take greater advantage of its relations with NGOs in the pursuit of its aims. The Liaison Committee and the Plenary Conference were associated to this work."

=== Second step: Attribution of the participatory status ===
On 19 November 2003, the Committee of Ministers changed the consultative status into a participatory status (Resolution Res (2003) 8), "considering that it is indispensable that the rules governing the relations between the Council of Europe and NGOs evolve to reflect the active participation of international non-governmental organisations (INGOs) in the Organisation's policy and work programme, and to facilitate INGO participation and access to such bodies as the steering committees and governmental expert committees, and other subsidiary bodies of the Committee of Ministers" and "recognising the important role to be played by the Liaison Committee as the democratically elected representative body of all of the INGOs enjoying participatory status with the Council of Europe, and by the INGO thematic groupings as their collective voice and, thus, of millions of European citizens, working in each of the fields represented by them".

At the same time, the Committee of Ministers created a status of partnership for national NGOs (Resolution (2003) 9). It is one of the priorities of the INGO Conference to enable national and local NGOs to benefit more from the Council of Europe's achievements and to contribute themselves to its work.

=== Third step: Political recognition ===
The INGOs enjoying now participatory status adapt the functioning of their bodies and, in January 2005. The Plenary Conference is given the title of "the INGO Conference of the Council of Europe" and adopts its new rules of procedure. The Council of Europe's activity report of the same year states that "this change in the title reflects the political recognition of the INGOs as a partner within the Council of Europe".

At the 3rd Summit of Head of States and governments of the Council of Europe in May 2005 in Warsaw, for the first time, the president of the INGO Conference is invited to take the floor in one's official capacity. In connection with the Summit, the INGO Conference holds an extraordinary meeting in Warsaw University to confirm its determination to support the Council of Europe through its connection to the grass root level, contributing to reduce the gap between politicians' actions and the needs and visions of the citizens.

In December 2005, the Committee of Ministers stipulates that the INGO Conference may delegate its representatives to the steering committees and subordinate bodies, like the Parliamentarian Assembly and the Congress of Local and Regional Authorities (Resolution (2005)47). The political recognition is followed by a progressive increase of the operational budget for the activities, organised by of the INGO Conference and the secretariat, and by the reinforcement of the latter. In June 2008, the INGO Conference reforms its organs to adapt further its functioning to the other pillars of the Council of Europe.

== Functioning ==
=== Voluntary work ===
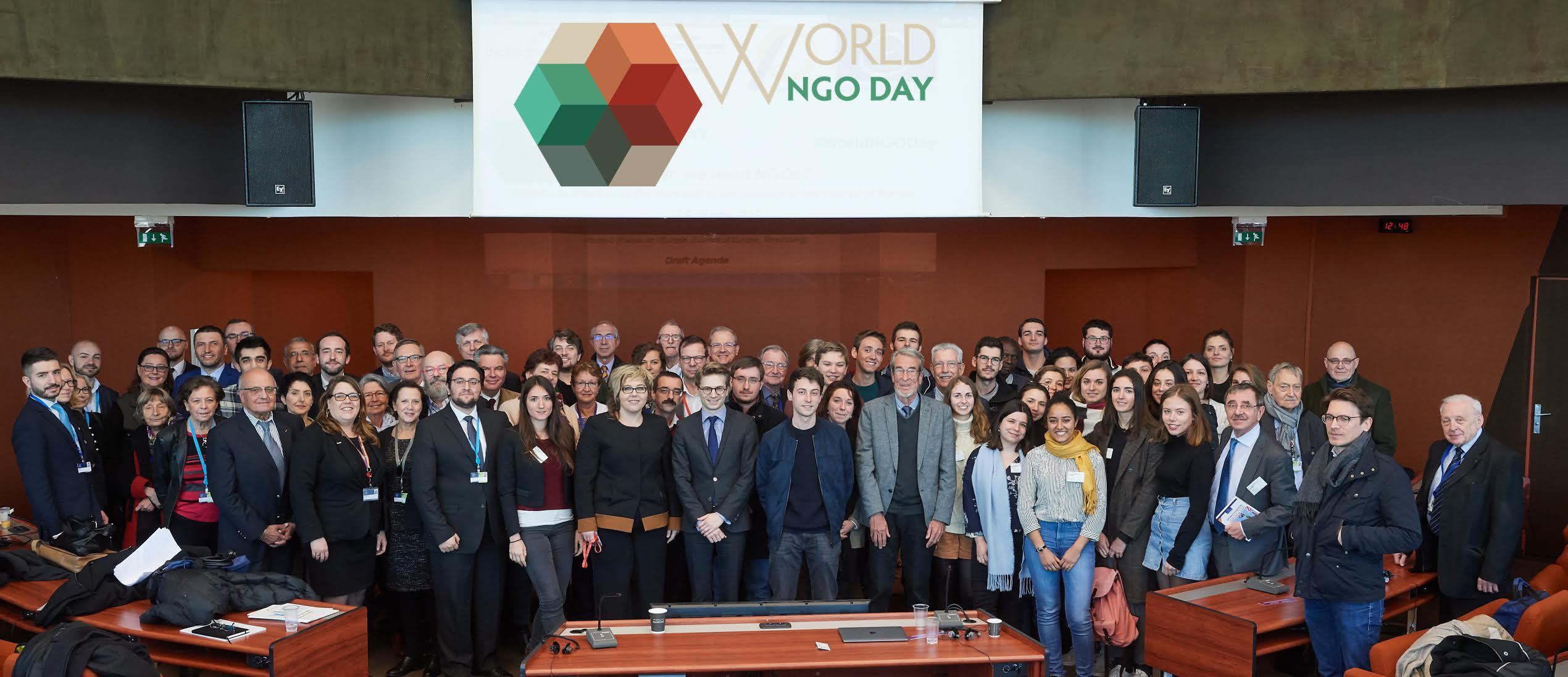
INGOs Conference of The Council of Europe is celebrating World NGO Day on 27 February 2019 in Strasbourg, France.

A characteristic of the representation of INGOs at the Council of Europe is the fact that it is done on a voluntary basis. On the one hand, the INGO representatives do not get any compensation for their work, regardless if they have an official function in the INGO Conference's structure or not. On the other hand, they themselves or their INGOs pay for their travel and subsistence costs during their stay in Strasbourg. With one exception: The members of the Standing Committee have their travel costs reimbursed by the Council of Europe for the four ordinary annual sessions of the Conference. This means that the representation is subordinated to each INGO's human and financial resources.

=== Internal organisation and "quadrilogue" ===
The INGO Conference of the Council of Europe, in 2010 made up of 366 INGOs enjoying participatory status, is the main decision-making body of the non-governmental organisations. It identifies the general action needed to organise its participation in the Council of Europe "quadrilogue" (partnership between the four pillars of the Council of Europe: Committee of Ministers, Parliamentary Assembly, Congress of Local and Regional Authorities, and INGO Conference). It ensures that the participatory system functions adequately and so helps to strengthen the political say of the civil society at the Council of Europe. It decides on policy lines and defines and adopts action programmes. The Conference of INGOs meets in Strasbourg three to four times a year during the ordinary sessions of the Parliamentary Assembly of the Council of Europe. It is chaired by its president in office, whom it elects every three years. The current President of the Conference of INGOs, Mr Jean-Marie Heydt, was elected in January 2009.

In its Madrid Declaration of May 2009, the Committee of Ministers confirms the role of the INGO Conference in the "quadrilogue" and states that "developing – with the help of the Conference of the International Non-Governmental Organisations (INGO) – interaction with civil society, whose action on the ground we applaud, will also remain one of our priorities" (CM(2009)50 final 12 May 2009).

A good practice of this "quadrilogue" is to be found in the Forum for the Future of Democracy, governed by the Council of Europe's quadripartite stakeholders. This is a guarantee of its crosscutting impact. Another example for the "quadrilogue" is the North-South Center of the Council of Europe, to the creation of which INGOs have contributed. In January 2010, a cooperation agreement was concluded between the North-South Center and the INGO Conference in order to strengthen their collaboration.

The Standing Committee is the second decision-making body of the non-governmental organisations. It has a consultative and proposal-making role vis-à-vis the INGO Conference and its Bureau and adopts the recommendations and resolutions expressing their commitment. It is responsible for co-ordination between the INGO Conference and its Committees; it promotes participation by the INGOs in the work of the other partners in the Council of Europe. The Bureau prepares the agenda for the meetings of the INGO Conference and its Standing Committee and implements the decisions taken by these two bodies.

During and between the sessions, the main work is done by the three committees where INGOs involved at local, national and European level cooperate on issues in the competence of the Council of Europe:

Committees

- Democracy, Social Cohesion and Global Challenges addressing since June 2011 the thematics of three previous committees ("Democracy and Civil Society", "Social cohesion and eradication of poverty", "Sustainable territorial development") and a transversal group "Europe and global challenges"
- Education and Culture
- Human rights

A delegate will be elected next January 2012 to deal with the Gender equality theme.

The committees prepare the contributions to the steering committees and subordinate bodies, organise with the secretariat the activities on these issues both in the Council of Europe and its member States and elaborate draft declarations and recommendations to the other pillars of the Council of Europe that will be adopted by the INGO Conference or its standing committee. They share their expertise with the directorates general and other constituencies of the Council of Europe.

In addition to this collective work, national and international NGOs are cooperating individually as experts with the different organs and directorates general of the Council of Europe.

=== Relations with the Parliamentary Assembly and the Congress ===
The committees work in synergy with the committees of the Parliamentary Assembly and the Congress of Local and Regional Authorities. They issue statements on their demand or at own initiative. To strengthen this cooperation, the Parliamentary Assembly adopted, in November 2007, a resolution on the "Co-operation between the Parliamentary Assembly and the Conference of INGOs" (Resolution 1589 (2007)1), noting "with satisfaction that the work programme of the Conference of INGOs contains several major themes which are closely related to the priorities of the Assembly. On this basis, it is convinced that additional steps should be taken with a view to an enhanced co-operation aimed at further developing citizen participation and dialogue with civil society".

In May 2008, the Congress of Local and Regional Authorities and the INGO Conference concluded "a resolution on Partnership between local and regional authorities and NGOs in Council of Europe member States to promote progressive and appropriate procedures for citizen participation between elections". This memorandum was established mainly to strengthen the position of national and local NGOs, which in their great majority do not have any link with the Council of Europe.

In April 2010, during the International Year of Biodiversity, the President of the INGO Conference Jean-Marie Heydt, Parliamentary Assembly President Mevlüt Çavusoglu and Acting President of the Congress Ian Micallef, signed for the first time a joint Declaration "Working together for Biodiversity".

=== Strengthening of civil society ===
The INGO Conference is also committed to strengthening the civil society in Council of Europe member States and in Belarus. Thus, it established the Expert Council on NGO Law which mainly monitors the implementation of the Recommendation of the Committee of Ministers to member states on the legal status of non-governmental organisations in Europe (CM/Rec (2007)14).

In October 2009 it adopted the Code of Good Practice for Civil Participation in the Decision-Making Process, recognised by the Committee of Ministers "as a reference document for the Council of Europe, and as a basis for a possible further development of the framework for the empowerment of citizens to be involved in conducting public affairs in European countries" (Declaration CM 21 October 2009).

Furthermore, since 2006 the INGO Conference organises Regional NGO Congresses designed for NGOs from Central and Eastern European countries. They took place in Warsaw, Kyiv, Penza (Russian Federation) and, last June 2010, Vilnius (Lithuania).
