= University Network of the European Capitals of Culture =

International non-profit association

The University Network of the European Capitals of Culture (UNeECC) is an international non-profit association founded upon the initiative of the University of Pécs in Pécs, Hungary in December 2006 by 15 founding members. The Secretariat of UNEECC is at the University of Pécs in Hungary.

== General assemblies and annual conferences ==
In 2007, the UNeECC GA and Conference was hosted by Lucian Blaga University in Sibiu. The Keynote Speaker of the Conference was Mr. Roger O’Keeffe Principal Administrator, from European Commission Directorate for Education and Culture.
In 2008, the GA and Annual Conference was organized by Liverpool Hope University and the University of Liverpool. The Keynote Speaker of the Conference was Prince Charles-Louis d’Arenberg.
In 2010, when the European Capital of Culture Programme celebrated its 25th anniversary. The University of Pécs hosted the General Assembly and Annual Conference of UNeECC. We were organizing a joint conference of UNeECC and the Compostela Group of Universities providing a unique platform for scientific collaboration and networking.
In 2011, UNeECC celebrated its 5th year of founding. The Annual Conference was held in Antwerp, Belgium, European Capital of Culture 1993.
In 2012, UNeECC organized its Annual Conference jointly with EMUNI and the University of Maribor in Maribor, Slovenia, European Capital of Culture 2012.
In 2013, UNeECC organized its Annual Conference jointly with Aix-Marseille University and EHESS School for Advanced Studies in the Social Sciences in Marseille, France, European Capital of Culture 2012.

1. 2007: Sibiu – 'Town and Gown'
2. 2008: Liverpool – 'Whose Culture(?)'
3. 2009: Vilnius – 'Innovation, Creativity and Culture'
4. 2010: Pécs
5. 2011: Antwerp
6. 2012: Maribor
7. 2013: Marseille
8. 2014: Umeå
9. 2015: Plzeň
10. 2016: Wrocław
11. 2017: Aarhus
12. 2018: Valletta
13. 2019: Matera
14. 2020: Galway
15. 2021: Not held
16. 2022: Kaunas
17. 2023: Veszprém
18. 2024: Timișoara
19. 2025: Avignon
20. 2026: Novi Sad

== Membership ==
UNeECC invites memberships in three different categories:

- Full Membership: Universities from cities of the European Capitals of Culture
- Associate Membership: Universities from applicant cities
- Supportive Membership: All others, including cities and cultural organizations with parallel interests

== Members ==
As of 2020, UNeECC has 61 members:

| University | City | Country |
|---|---|---|
| FH Joanneum; Fachhochschule Joanneum | Graz | Austria |
| University of Applied Sciences Kufstein; Fachhochschule Kufstein Tirol | Kufstein | Austria |
| University of Antwerp; Universiteit Antwerpen | Antwerp | Belgium |
| College of Europe; Collège d'Europe | Bruges | Belgium |
| Vesalius College | Brussels | Belgium |
| Free University of Brussels; Vrije Universiteit Brussel | Brussels | Belgium |
| Brussels Management School; Institut catholique des Hautes Études commerciales | Brussels | Belgium |
| Catholic University of Leuven; Katholieke Universiteit Leuven | Leuven | Belgium |
| Catholic University of Louvain; Université catholique de Louvain | Louvain-la-Neuve | Belgium |
| University of Economics Varna; Икономически университет – Варна | Varna | Bulgaria |
| University of Dubrovnik; Sveučilište u Dubrovniku | Dubrovnik | Croatia |
| Academy of Arts and Culture in Osijek; Akademija za umjetnost i kulturu u Osijeku | Osijek | Croatia |
| Juraj Dobrila University of Pula; Sveučilište Jurja Dobrile u Puli | Pula | Croatia |
| Neapolis University Paphos; Πανεπιστήμιο Νεάπολις Πάφου | Paphos | Cyprus |
| Ladislav Sutnar Faculty of Design and Art, University of West Bohemia; Fakulta designu a umění Ladislava Sutnara Západočeské univerzity | Plzeň | Czechia |
| Aarhus University; Aarhus Universitet | Aarhus | Denmark |
| Avignon University; Avignon Université | Avignon | France |
| Catholic University of Lille; Université catholique de Lille | Lille | France |
| University of Lille; Université de Lille | Lille | France |
| National and Kapodistrian University of Athens; Εθνικό και Καποδιστριακό Πανεπιστήμιο Αθηνών | Athens | Greece |
| School of Architecture, Aristotle University of Thessaloniki; Τμήμα Αρχιτεκτόνων Μηχανικών, Αριστοτέλειο Πανεπιστήμιο Θεσσαλονίκης | Thessaloniki | Greece |
| University of Patras; Πανεπιστήμιο Πατρών | Patras | Greece |
| University of Piraeus; Πανεπιστήμιο Πειραιώς | Piraeus | Greece |
| University Center of International Programmes of Studies, International Hellenic University; Διεθνές Πανεπιστήμιο της Ελλάδος | Thermi | Greece |
| Széchenyi István University; Széchenyi István Egyetem | Győr | Hungary |
| Archiepiscopal College of Veszprém; Veszprémi Érseki Főiskola | Veszprém | Hungary |
| University of Pécs; Pécsi Tudományegyetem | Pécs | Hungary |
| University of Pannonia; Pannon Egyetem | Veszprém | Hungary |
| Cork Institute of Technology; Institiúid Teicneolaíochta Chorcaí | Cork | Ireland |
| University College Cork; Coláiste na hOllscoile Corcaigh | Cork | Ireland |
| University of Basilicata; Università degli Studi della Basilicata | Potenza; Matera | Italy |
| University of Genoa; Università di Genova | Genoa | Italy |
| University of Perugia; Università degli Studi di Perugia | Perugia | Italy |
| University of Daugavpils; Daugavpils Universitāte | Daugavpils | Latvia |
| Turība University; Biznesa augstskola "Turība" | Riga | Latvia |
| Latvian Academy of Culture; Latvijas Kultūras akadēmija | Riga | Latvia |
| Mykolas Romeris University; Mykolo Romerio universitetas | Vilnius; Kaunas | Lithuania |
| Vilnius Gediminas Technical University; Vilniaus Gedimino technikos universitetas | Vilnius | Lithuania |
| Vytautas Magnus University; Vytauto Didžiojo universitetas | Kaunas | Lithuania |
| University of Luxembourg; Université du Luxembourg / Universität Luxemburg / Universitéit Lëtzebuerg | Luxembourg; Esch-sur-Alzette | Luxembourg |
| University of Malta; L-Università ta' Malta | Msida | Malta |
| Nord University; Nord universitet / Nuortta universitiehtta | Bodø | Norway |
| University of Stavanger; Universitetet i Stavanger | Stavanger | Norway |
| Kraków University of Economics; Uniwersytet Ekonomiczny w Krakowie | Kraków | Poland |
| AGH University of Kraków; Akademia Górniczo-Hutnicza w Krakowie | Kraków | Poland |
| University of Wrocław; Uniwersytet Wrocławski | Wrocław | Poland |
| Pontifical University of John Paul II; Uniwersytet Papieski Jana Pawła II w Krakowie | Kraków | Poland |
| Fernando Pessoa University; Universidade Fernando Pessoa | Porto | Portugal |
| Politehnica University of Timișoara; Universitatea Politehnica Timișoara | Timișoara | Romania |
| Sapientia Hungarian University of Transylvania; Universitatea Sapientia / Sapientia Erdélyi Magyar Tudományegyetem | Cluj-Napoca | Romania |
| West University of Timișoara; Universitatea de Vest din Timișoara | Timișoara | Romania |
| University Business Academy in Novi Sad; Univerzitet Privredna akademija u Novom Sadu | Novi Sad | Serbia |
| University of Novi Sad; Универзитет у Новом Саду / Univerzitet u Novom Sadu | Novi Sad | Serbia |
| University of Maribor; Univerza v Mariboru | Maribor | Slovenia |
| Alfonso X El Sabio University; Universidad Alfonso X El Sabio | Villanueva de la Cañada; Madrid | Spain |
| Umeå University; Umeå universitet | Umeå | Sweden |
| Bahçeşehir University; Bahçeşehir Üniversitesi | Istanbul | Turkey |
| Istanbul University; İstanbul Üniversitesi | Istanbul | Turkey |
| Istanbul Technical University; İstanbul Teknik Üniversitesi | Istanbul | Turkey |
| Istanbul Gedik University; İstanbul Gedik Üniversites | Istanbul | Turkey |
| Liverpool Hope University | Liverpool | United Kingdom |

== See also ==
- European Capital of Culture – Cities recognized by the European Union as culturally significant for Europe
- American Capital of Culture – Latin American and Caribbean initiative
- Arab Capital of Culture – Arab League effort to promote and celebrate Arab culture
