= Dominique Magnan =

18th-century French Minim friar

Dominique Magnan (1731–1796), a learned French abbot of the Trinità dei Monti convent, of the Order of Minims, in Rome, who was deeply involved in the intellectual life of his community during the second half of the 18th century.

== Biography ==
Dominique Magnan was born at Reillanne, in Provence, on May 29, 1731.

He studied at the University of Avignon, then joined the Order of Minims of La Ciotat at age 20, where he began his career as a collector of ancient coins and medals. Appointed professor of theology in Marseille, he continued his work. He got in touch with the most famous antiquaries of the time, both in Italy and Germany, and speedily acquired an extensive reputation.

According to the nineteenth-century biographers, he was invited by Francis I to attend the Imperial Medal Cabinet. But results of recent research provide no evidence that it does. Neither in the archives of the Hofburg nor in published studies on Vienna Collections. We don't known why he ended up in Rome instead of Vienna but he lived for nearly thirty years in the old convent of Trinity.

True to a well-established tradition in the Minims, the Trinità dei Monti knew how to develop assets to participate in the Enlightenment debate. In the first place, a library. But they also did astronomy, botany, numismatics and published a lot. And Dominique Magnan was mainly the leader of this small group of religious. He had found here a good environment to undertake his scientific work.

His first books received critical acclaim. But his most significant works were on numismatics, though heavily criticized by specialists of the time in that universal and complete coverage of the subject could maintain confusion between authentic coins and the fake ones.

Having become treasurer of the convent, he had had to be accountable during the Apostolic Visit in 1794, which was fatal to him. Cardinal de Bernis directed that an inventory of his goods should be taken. About sixty in-folios in geography, numismatics, archeology were found, but also books of biblical scholarship, dictionaries and the Encyclopédie.

Asked to leave the Papal States in three days, he fled to Florence where he died in extreme misery in 1796.

== Sources ==
- Balsamo, Isabelle (1981). "La vie intellectuelle à la Trinité-des-Monts au XVIIIe siècle. In: Les fondations nationales dans la Rome pontificale. Actes du colloque de Rome (16-19 mai 1978)" [Intellectual life in the Trinità dei Monti in the 18th century. In: National foundations in pontifical Rome. Proceedings of the Rome Symposium (May 16–19, 1978)]. Publications de l'École française de Rome (in French). 52: 453–478.
