= Turība University =

Business school in Riga, Latvia

Coordinates: 56°54′37″N 24°04′53″E

- Biznesa augstskola „Turība”
- Motto: Non scholae, sed vitae discimus (We do not study for our school, but rather for our lives)
- Type: Private
- Established: 1993; 33 years ago
- Rector: Zane Driņķe
- Students: 4400 (year 2024/2025)
- Location: Riga, Latvia
- Website: www.turiba.lv

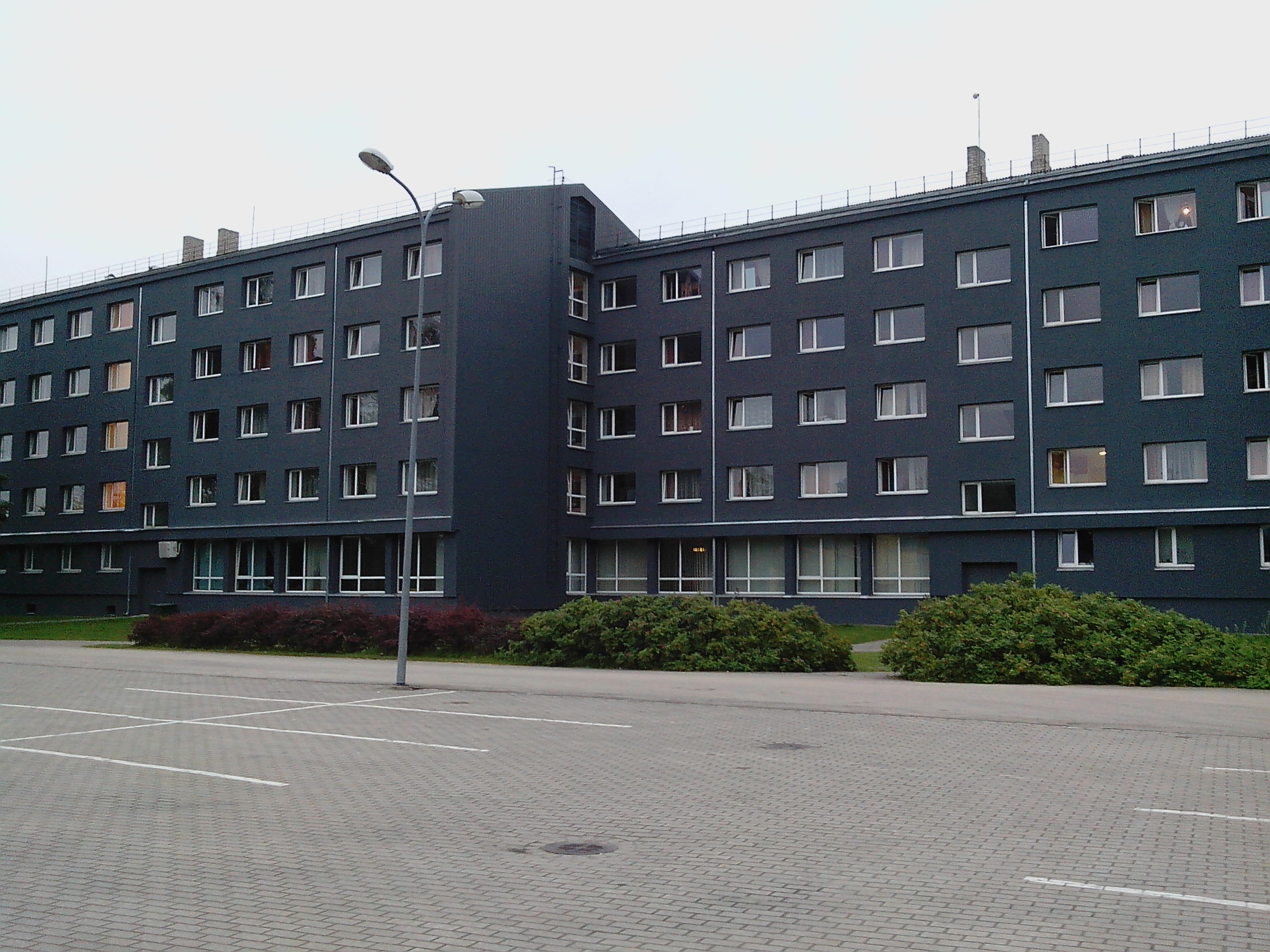
Turība University hostel

Turība University (Latvian: Biznesa augstskola "Turība"; formerly known as the Turība School of Business Administration) is the largest business school in Baltic states. The university was established in 1993. It has three branches located in Liepāja, Cēsis, and Talsi.

== Faculties ==
The university has four faculties and several study programs offering professional bachelor's, professional master's and doctoral degrees, as well as first-level professional higher education. The university offers 32 study programs, 13 of which are also available in English.

Faculty of Business Administration (Dean — Evija Kļave, Associate Professor);

Faculty of Law (Dean — Ivo Krievs, Mg.iur., Lecturer);

Faculty of International Tourism (Dean — Ēriks Lingebērziņš, Dr.oec., Associate Professor);

Faculty of Information Technology (Dean — Jānis Pekša, Ph.D., Associate Professor)

Communication Department (Head — Jana Bunkus, Mg.soc.comm., Lecturer)

Health Care Department (Head — Marika Kaprano-Ģederte, Mg.Soc.admin., Lecturer)

== International activities ==
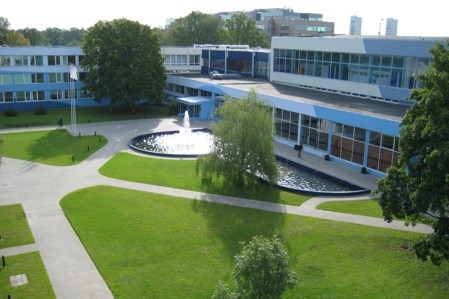
A building of Turība University in Riga, Latvia

The professional bachelor study programme Management of Tourism and Hospitality Companies and the professional master study programme Tourism Strategic Management have obtained the WTO TedQual certificate - accreditation of the United Nations World Tourism Organization (UNWTO). Turība has become the first higher education institution in the Baltic region and Scandinavian countries to receive accreditation by the UNWTO and a high evaluation by internationally recognised experts. The school is an active member of University Network of the European Capitals of Culture (UNeECC) and has been admitted as a member in the AACSB International, the Association to Advance Collegiate Schools of Business, which unites the leading higher educational institutions of business, in EURASHE - European Association of Institutions of Higher Education and ELFA, European Law Faculties Association. In addition, Turība University offers students an opportunity to study in more than 120 partner universities as part of ERASMUS + study mobility program.

== Notable alumni ==
Notable alumni include:

- Ilona Marhele, women's marathon runner, participant of the 2016 Summer Olympics;
- Ilona Jurševska former Minister of Welfare of Latvia, Member of the Saeima.

=== Honorary fellows ===
Since 2015, the university has awarded honorary degrees (honoris causa) to notable individuals as part of their Annual Award “Freedom. Susceptibility. Competence.” ceremony. The title of honorary confirms Turība University's recognition to person's merits which are for society and university's benefits, and it does not give any material or financial benefits. The title of honorary (honoris causa) is granted for life. The title of honorary can be withdrawn due to very serious reasons by a decision of the Constituent Assembly of Turība University.

Doctor honoris causa, Dr.h.c: Vaira Vīķe-Freiberga (Sixth President of Latvia and the first female President of Latvia. Currently serves as the president of Club of Madrid, the world's largest forum of former Heads of State and Government), the Latvian academician, physics chemist, science historian Jānis Stradiņš.

Professor honoris causa, Prof.h.c: Guntis Zemītis (Professor of Turība University), Aivars Endziņš, chairman of the Commission of development of legal environment of President, the member of Council of Europe Commission for Democracy through Law, Venice Commission, and the professor of Turība University.

Notable alumnus/alumna honoris causa like: Ināra Pētersone (former director general of Latvian Revenues and Customs Authority), Mārcis Liors Skadmanis FRSA founder of World NGO Day - 27 February, for NGOs worldwide, Edgars Štelmahers (Chairman of SIA „New Rosme”), Guna Paidere, the main state notary of the Register of Enterprises of Latvia.

== See also ==
- List of universities in Latvia
