= Avignon University =

Public university based in Avignon, France

- Avignon Université
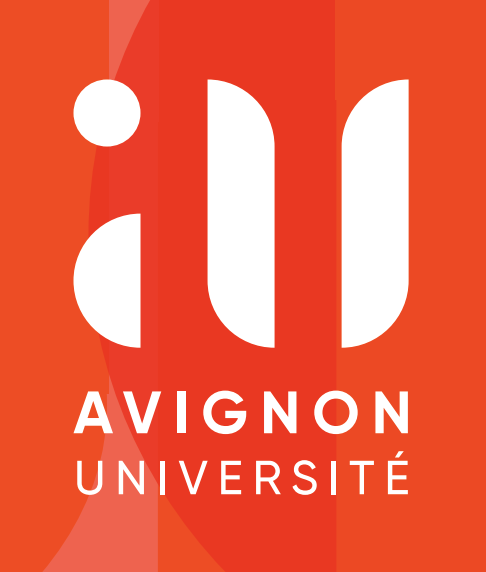
- Motto: Ne pas attendre l'avenir, le faire Do not wait for the future, make it happen
- Type: Public
- Established: 1303–1792 (original formation): Université d'Avignon 1984 (reopened): Université d'Avignon et des Pays de Vaucluse 2018 (renamed): Avignon Université
- Affiliations: AUF, EAIE, UNeECC
- Budget: €60.6 million
- President: Philippe Ellerkamp
- Faculty: 712 including 379 professors, 333 personnel
- Students: 7,505
- Location: Avignon, Vaucluse, Provence-Alpes-Côte d'Azur, France
- Campus: Urban
- Website: Official Site

Avignon University (French: Avignon Université; formerly known as Université d'Avignon et des Pays de Vaucluse) is a public university located in Avignon, France, and founded in 1303.

Avignon University is situated on two campuses: the Hannah Arendt Campus, located in the city centre of Avignon, and the Jean-Henri Fabre Campus, which is on the outskirts of town and includes the Agroparc facility for STEM teaching and research, as well as the Avignon University Institute of Technology.

The university is well regarded for its international education outreach, and was awarded the ERASMUS University Charter for Higher Education by the European Commission in 2021.

Avignon University is a member of the Association of Francophone Universities, the European Association for International Education, and the University Network of the European Capitals of Culture.

== History ==
The university was founded in 1303 by Pope Boniface VIII, and closed in 1792 during the French Revolution. It was re-opened as L'Université d'Avignon et des Pays de Vaucluse in 1984 following the 1963 establishment of an annex of Faculté des Sciences d'Aix-Marseille in Avignon. The university was renamed Avignon Université in 2018.

== Academics ==
Avignon University offers bachelors, masters, doctoral, and BUT/DUT certifications in the following disciplines:

- Business
- Computer Science
- Economic and Social Administration
- Economy, Management
- Engineering
- Foreign Languages
- French Literature
- Geography
- History
- Information and Communication
- Languages, Literatures and Foreign Civilisations
- Law
- Life Science
- Mathematics
- Packaging
- Physics, Chemistry
- Public Administration
- Sports

== Campus ==
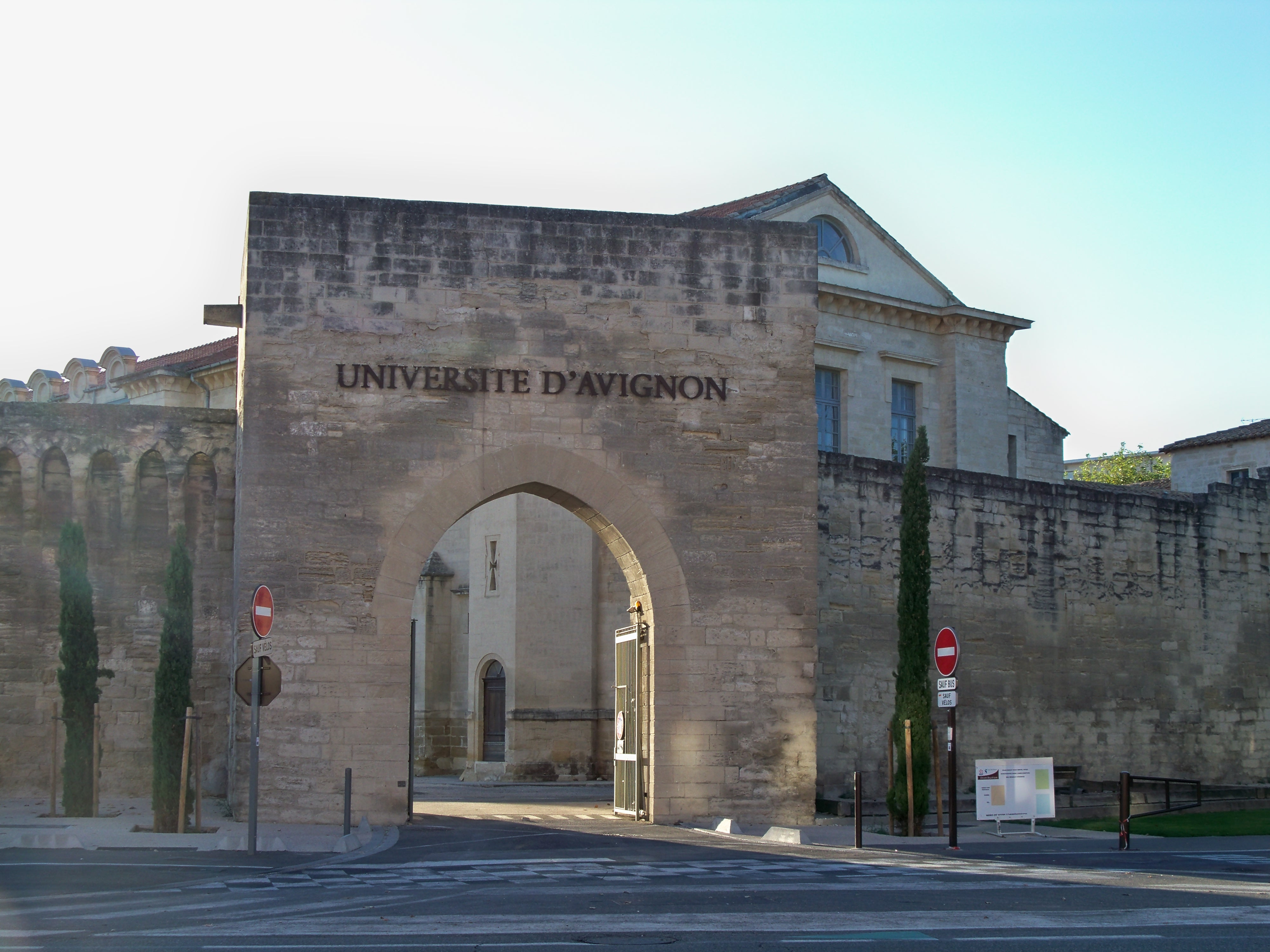
Entrance to the Hannah Arendt Campus

The Hannah Arendt Campus is located in the heart of Avignon. It includes several historic buildings, including the former Sainte-Marthe Hospital. The Hannah Arendt Campus is principally used for arts, humanities, and law courses. University administration, the Maurice Agulhon university library, and a fitness center are also housed on Hannah Arendt.

The Jean-Henri Fabre Campus is located 9 km (5 miles) southeast of Hannah Arendt. It features more modern buildings and spacious lawns. Being home to the Agroparc STEM facility and the Institute of Technology, the Jean-Henri Fabre Campus is principally used for science and technology courses. It is also home to the Agroparc library.

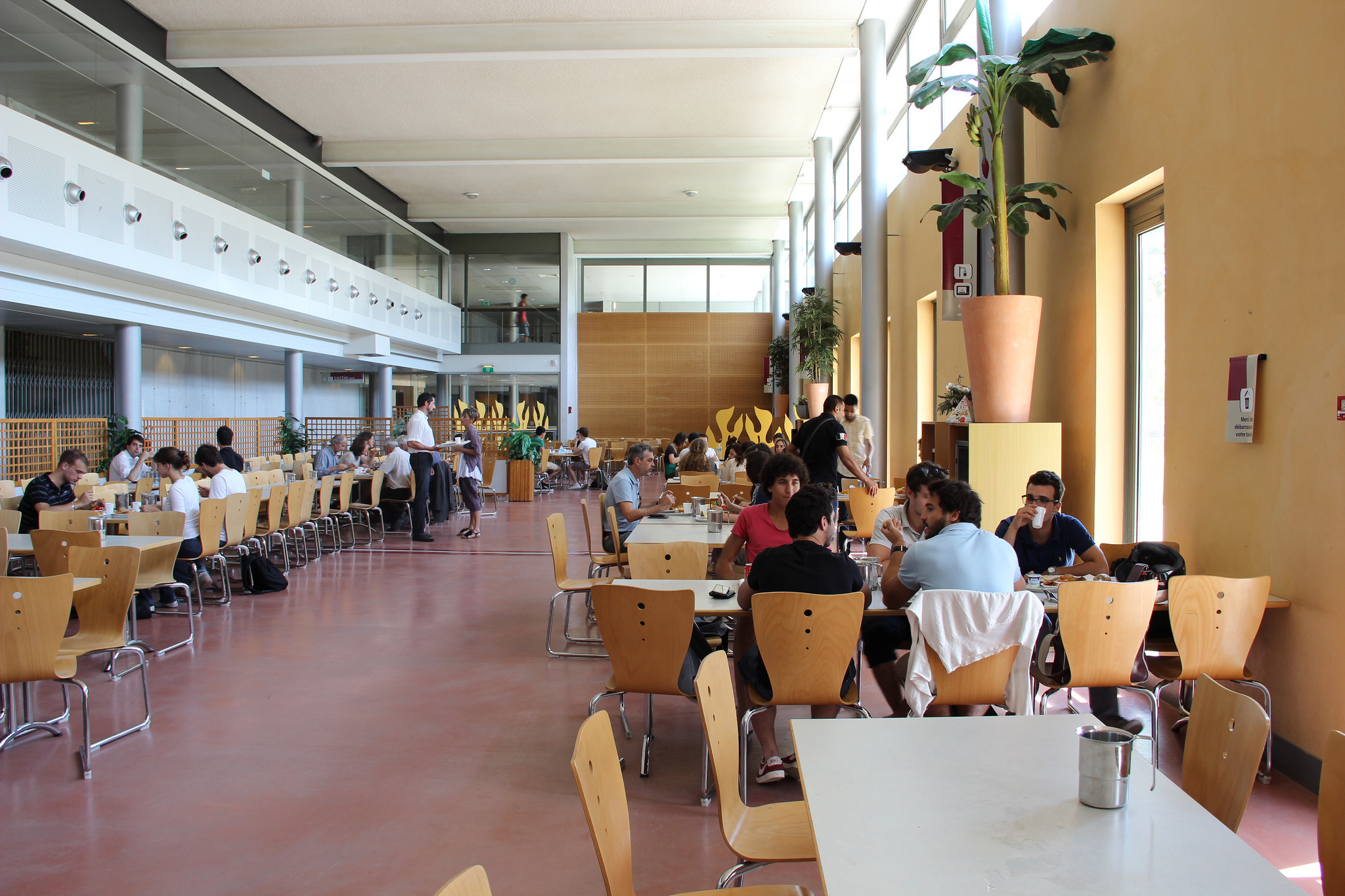
Sainte-Marthe Dining Hall

Avignon University has several Centre régional des œuvres universitaires et scolaires student residences and dining halls, as well as a number of student clubs and organisations.

Avignon University is the place of study for students from 96 different countries, as of the 2018–2019 academic year. International students comprise 13% of the student body.

== Notable faculty ==
=== Ancient ===
- Jean de Tulles (died 1608) - university chamberlain and abbott
- Louis Bancel (1628–1685) - Dominican theologian
- Joseph Galien (1699–1762) - Dominican professor of philosophy and theology, meteorologist, physicist, and writer on aeronautics
- Pierre-Louis Moline (c. 1740–1820) - dramatist, poet and librettist

=== Modern ===
- Anna Livia (author) (1955–2007) - Irish feminist author and linguist
- Marie-Claude Arnaud (born 1963) - mathematician,

== Notable alumni ==
=== Pre-Modern ===
- Honoré Bonet (c. 1340 – c. 1410) - Provençal Benedictine, the prior of Salon
- Jean-Allarmet de Brogny (1342–1426) - Catholic Cardinal
- Paulus Castrensis - Italian jurist
- Thomas de Buittle (died c. 1420–1422) - Scottish prelate, clerk and papal auditor
- Michel de Nostredame, (1503-1566) - astrologer and physician
- Jérôme Nadal (1507–1580) - Spanish Jesuit priest; known as the Ignatian theologian for having developed the theology behind Ignatian spirituality
- Bernado Luis Cotoner y Ballester (1571–1641) - member of the Dominican Order; Apostolic Inquisitor of Sardinia
- Pierre Gassendi (1592–1655) - philosopher, Catholic priest, astronomer, and mathematician
- Athanasius Kircher (1602–1680) - German Jesuit scholar and polymath
- Nicolas Saboly (1614–1675) - poet, composer and choirmaster
- Girolamo Grimaldi (1674–1733) - catholic cardinal who worked in the Vatican diplomatic service
- Dominique Magnan (1731–1796) - learned French abbot
- Claude-François Achard (1751–1809) - physician and author

=== Modern ===
- Charles de Ferry de Fontnouvelle (1877–1956) - diplomat and pedagogue
- Ina Hartwig (born 1963) - German writer, literature critic
- Mehdi Soltani (born 1971) - Iranian actor
- Vincent Almendros (born 1978) - novelist
- Hamidou Tembine (born 1982) - game theorist
- Astrid Vayson de Pradenne (born 1985) - professional golfer.

== See also ==
- Media related to Université d'Avignon at Wikimedia Commons
- List of public universities in France
