= Joseph Galien =

- Born: 1699; Saint-Paulien, France
- Died: c. 1772 (aged c. 73); France

Joseph Galien OP (1699 – c. 1772) was a Dominican professor of philosophy and theology at the University of Avignon, meteorologist, physicist, and writer on aeronautics.

== Biography ==
Born at Saint-Paulien, near Le Puy-en-Velay in southern France, Galien entered the Dominican Order at Le Puy. He studied philosophy and theology at the Dominican institution in Avignon with such success that he was sent to Bordeaux as professor of philosophy as early as 1726. From the year 1745 on he held the chair of theology at Avignon, and from 1747, the chair of philosophy. He seems to have resigned his professorship in 1751 to devote his energies entirely to the study of meteorology and physics. Galien died in 1762 in the Dominican monastery at Le Puy, or, according to other accounts, in 1782 at Avignon.

== Publications ==
He published Lettres théologiques touchant l'état de pure nature, la distinction du naturel et du sur-naturel, et les autres matières qui en sont de conséquences (Avignon, 1745); also the Explication physique des effets de l'électricité (Avignon, 1747).

But Galien's most important contribution was a booklet that he issued anonymously in 1755 at Avignon under the title "Mémoire touchant la nature et la formation de la grêle et des autres météores qui y ont rapport, avec une conséquence ultérieure de la possibilité de naviger [sic] dans l'air à la hauteur de la région de la grêle. Amusement physique et géométrique". The second edition of this booklet, this time with the name of its author, appeared as early as 1757. The change in its title renders it easy to discern what made the monograph so interesting. It was now called: "L'art de naviguer dans les airs, amusement physique et géométrique, précédé d'un mémoire sur la formation de la grêle."

== The airship ==
After propounding his theory regarding hailstorms, Galien calculates how large an airship would have to be in order to transport an entire army with its equipment to Africa. His scheme was to construct a gigantic cubic vessel of good, strong canvas of double thickness plastered with wax and tar, covered with leather and reinforced in places with ropes and rigging; its edge was to be 1,000 toises (roughly 2,000 m), and each surface 1,000,000 sq. toises (approximately 4,000,000 m²) in area. In both length and breadth it would be larger than the city of Avignon, and would resemble a fair-sized mountain. It would carry 54 times as much weight as did Noah's Ark, and be capable of transporting an army with its artillery and provisions for a year.

The air being lighter at the summit of a mountain than at the level of the sea, by filling this vessel with the mountain air, it must displace, being on the ground, a mass of air of greater weight than that with which it was filledplus the weight of the craft and its cargo. This vessel would have to float in the atmospheric level of the "hail belt", as the atmosphere there is a thousand times lighter than water, while in the strata above this, into which the top of the cube would extend, the air is two thousand times lighter than water.

For the scientific principles of his proposal Galien relied on Francesco de Lana, S.J. and perhaps also on Gaspar Schott. His chief claim to importance lies in the fact that the Montgolfier brothers were acquainted with him, or at least his booklet. His birthplace was very near to theirs and like Galien, the Montgolfiers began with meteorological observations; moreover, the elder of the brothers made a first ascension at Avignon in 1782. In aeronautical works Galien is, for the most part, unfairly treated; as the writers assume that his scheme was meant seriously, contrary to his statement given on the title page.

== See also ==
- List of Roman Catholic scientist-clerics
