= Saint-Julien-Molin-Molette =

- Commune
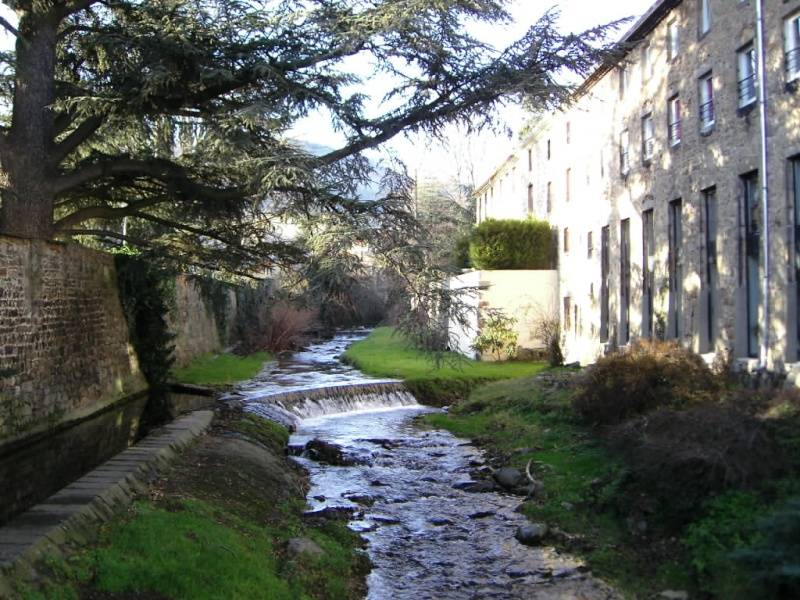
- Ternay River

- Coat of arms
- Location of Saint-Julien-Molin-Molette
- Location within France Location within Auvergne-Rhône-Alpes
- Coordinates: 45°19′23″N 4°36′58″E
- Country: France
- Region: Auvergne-Rhône-Alpes
- Department: Loire
- Arrondissement: Saint-Étienne
- Canton: Le Pilat
- Intercommunality: Monts du Pilat

Government
  - Mayor (2020–2026): Céline Elie
- Area^{1}: 9.45 km^{2} (3.65 sq mi)
- Elevation: 589 m (1,932 ft)
- Highest elevation: 880 m (2,890 ft)
- Lowest elevation: 441 m (1,447 ft)
- Population (2023): 1,140
  - Density: 121/km^{2} (312/sq mi)
- Time zone: UTC+01:00 (CET)
  - Summer (DST): UTC+02:00 (CEST)
- INSEE/Postal code: 42246 /42220
- ^{1} French Land Register data, which excludes lakes, ponds, glaciers > 1 km^{2} (0.386 sq mi or 247 acres) and river estuaries.

Saint-Julien-Molin-Molette (Occitan: Sant Julian-Molin-Moleta; French pronunciation: [sɛ̃ ʒyljɛ̃ mɔlɛ̃ mɔlɛt]) is a commune in the Loire department in central France.

== Population ==
Historical population
Year	Pop.	±% p.a.
1968	1,285	—
1975	1,219	−0.75%
1982	1,193	−0.31%
1990	1,067	−1.39%
1999	1,132	+0.66%
2007	1,193	+0.66%
2012	1,262	+1.13%
2017	1,147	−1.89%
2023	1,140	−0.10%
Source: INSEE

== See also ==
- Communes of the Loire department
- Louis Bancel, French sculptor born in Saint-Julien-Molin-Molette
