= Sophie Achard =

French statistical neuroscientist

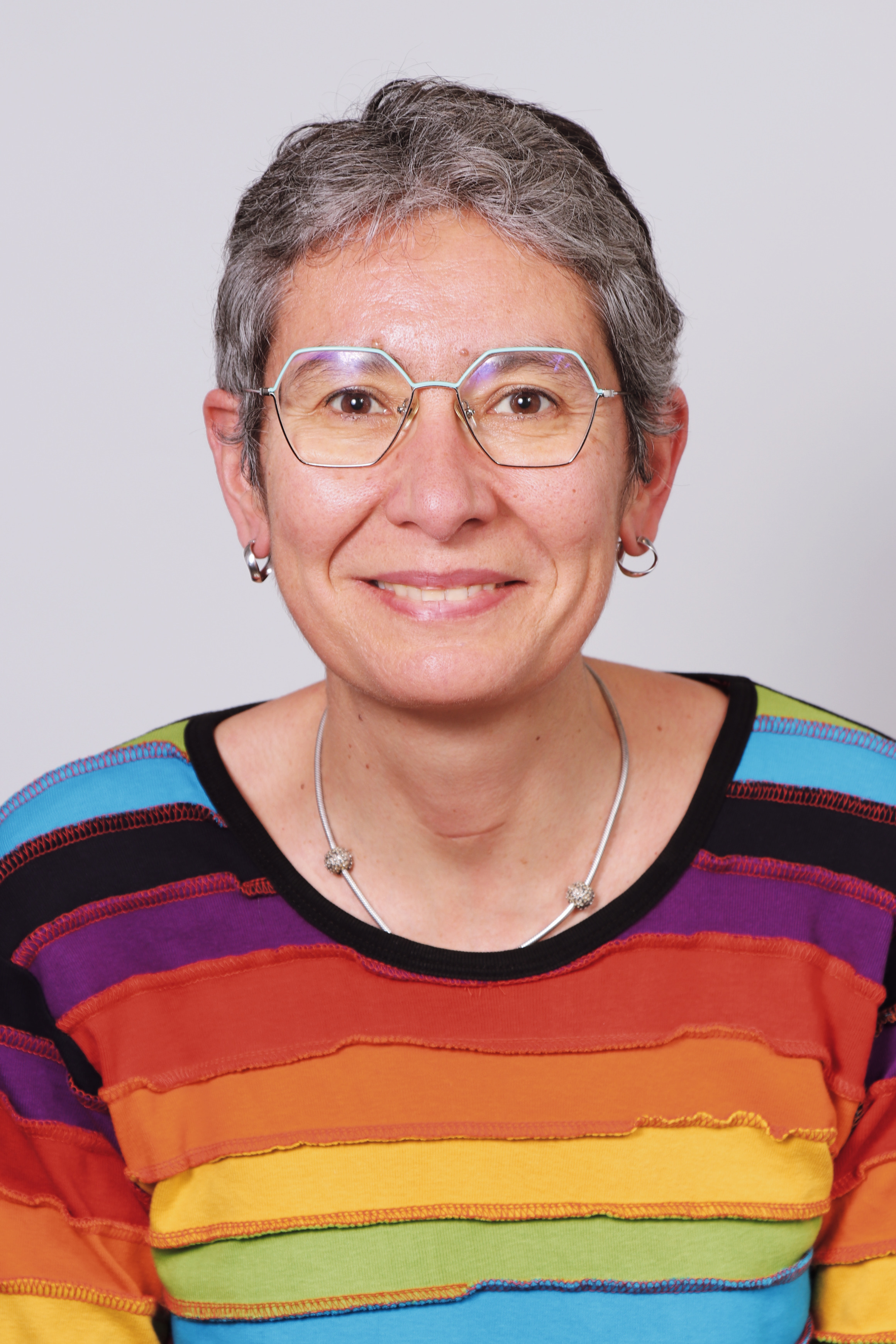

Sophie Achard (born 1977) is a French statistician and neuroscientist whose research concerns the statistics of the pattern of connectivity in the brain. She is a director of research for the French National Centre for Scientific Research (CNRS), affiliated with the French Institute for Research in Computer Science and Automation (Inria) laboratory at Grenoble Alpes University.

== Education and career ==
Achard studied mathematics, statistics, and numerical analysis at Jean Monnet University, earning a bachelor's degree in 1999. She earned a master's degree through research on the statistics of mixture models at Joseph Fourier University in Grenoble 2000, and completed a Ph.D. there in 2003. Her doctoral dissertation, Mesures de dépendance pour la séparation aveugle de sources : application aux mélanges post non linéaires, was directed by Dinh-Tuan Pham and Christian Jutten.

After postdoctoral research in the Brain Mapping Unit at the University of Cambridge with Edward Bullmore from 2004 to 2007, she returned to Grenoble as a CNRS researcher in 2008, and was promoted to director of research in 2017.

== Recognition ==
Achard received the CNRS Silver Medal in 2023.
