= Claude-François Achard =

French physician and author

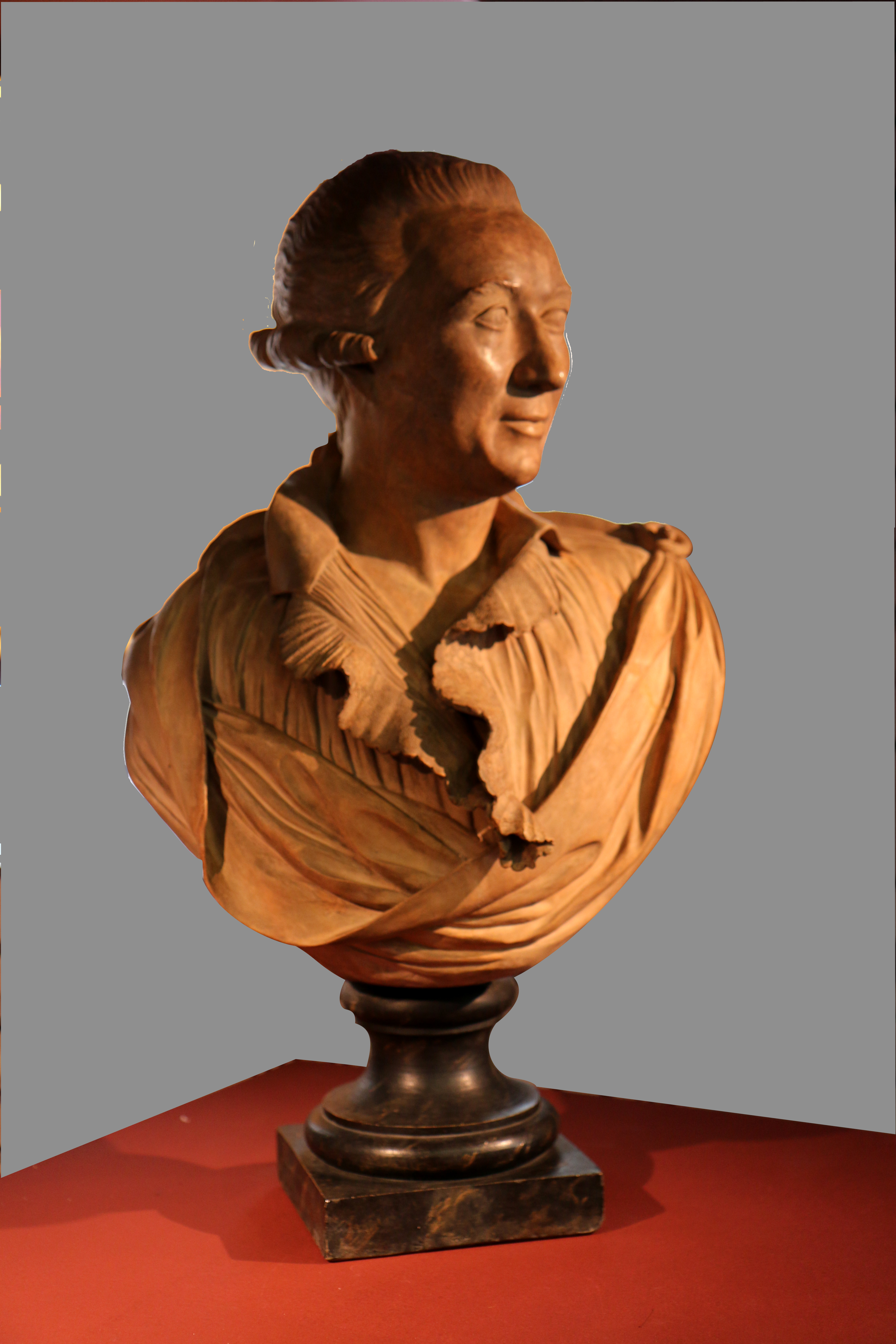
- Bust designed by Barthélémy-François Chardigny
- Born: 23 May 1751; Marseille, France
- Died: 29 September 1809 (aged 58); Marseille, France
- Education: University of Avignon
- Occupations: Physician, author

Claude-François Achard (1751–1809) was a French physician and author. He was the founder of the first public library in Marseille. He was the author of several books, including the first French-Provençal dictionary.

== Early life ==
Claude-François Achard was born on 23 May 1751 in Marseille, France. He was raised as a Roman Catholic. He was educated in Montpellier, and he earned a doctorate in medicine from the University of Avignon in 1772.

== Career ==
Achard started his career as a physician in Aubagne from 1772 to 1775. He subsequently practised medicine in Marseille, and he became a member of the Société Royale de médecine de Paris in 1785.

Achard was also the author of several non-fiction books. For example, he wrote the first French-Provençal dictionary. He became a member of the Académie de Marseille in 1786.

Achard began collecting books from Catholic schools and monasteries closed down during the French Revolution in 1790. By 1793, he was a founder of the first public library in Marseille, based in the Couvent des Bernardines.

Achard was a Freemason. He spearheaded the growth of Freemasonry in Marseille during the French Consulate, and he reopened a lodge known as "La Triple union".

== Death and legacy ==
Achard died on 29 September 1809 in Marseille. The Rue Achard in the 4th arrondissement of Marseille was named in his honor.

== Works ==
- Achard, Claude-François (1785). Le vocabulaire Français-Provençal et Provençal-Français.
- Achard, Claude-François (1786–1787). Histoire des hommes illustres de la Provence. J. Mossy.
- Achard, Claude-François (1787–1788). Description historique, géographique et topographique des villes, bourgs, villages et hameaux de Provence ancienne et moderne, du Comtat Venaissin et de la principauté d'Orange, du comté de Nice pour servir de suite au dictionnaire de la Provence.
