= Antoine Achard =

Antoine Achard (1696–1772) was a Genevan Protestant minister born in Geneva. He settled in Berlin in 1724 where he received the title of privy counsellor and was admitted into the Royal Academy of Berlin in 1743. He died in 1772.

After his death two volumes of his sermons were prepared, and they were published in 1774.
