= Léon Achard =

French tenor

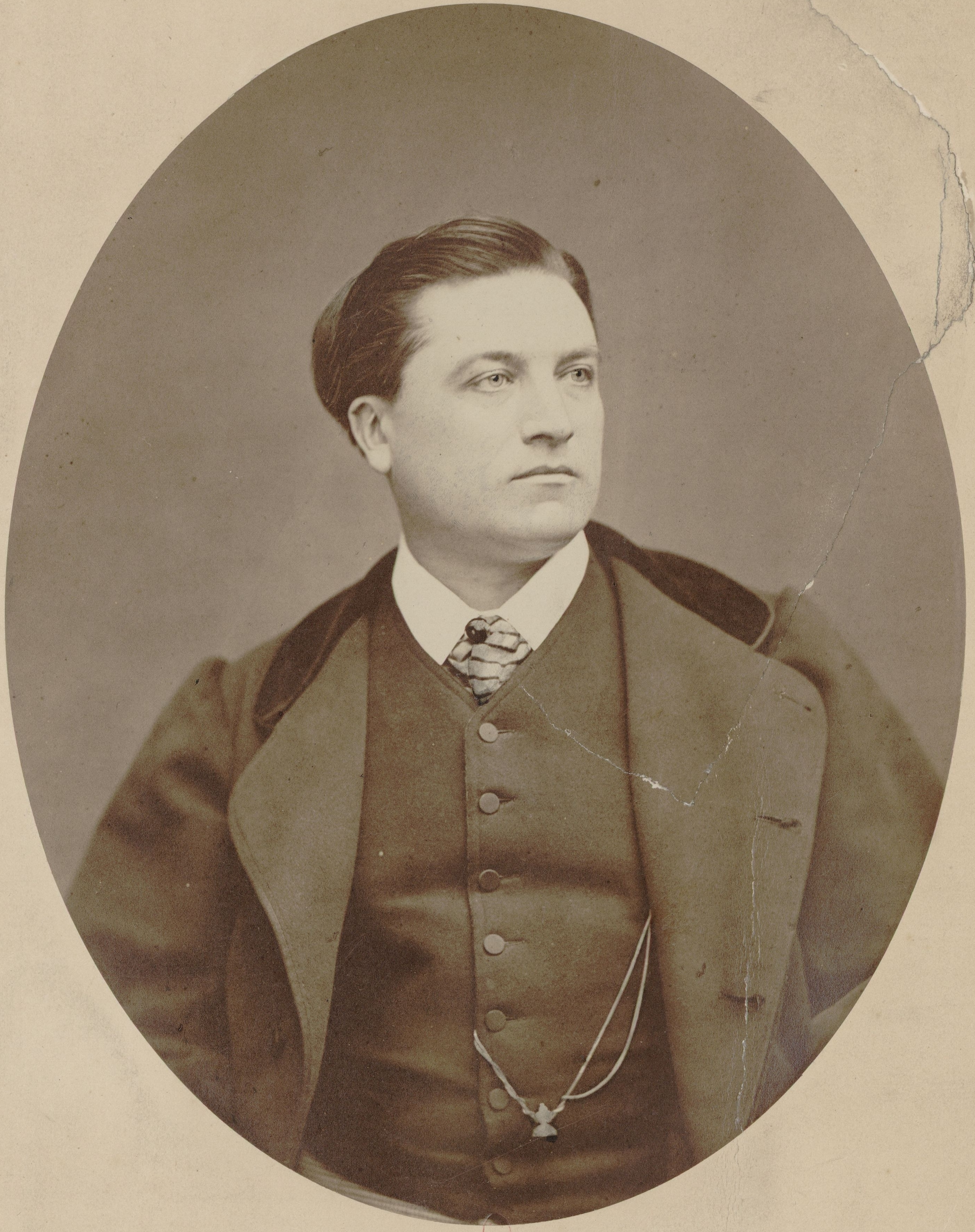
- Léon Achard photographed by Étienne Carjat in 1890
- Born: 16 February 1831; Lyon, France
- Died: 10 July 1905 (aged 74); Paris
- Education: Conservatoire de Paris
- Occupations: opera singer; tenor

Léon Achard (16 February 1831 – 10 July 1905) was a French tenor.

== Biography ==
Born in Lyon, Achard was the son of Pierre-Frédéric Achard, modest canut became an artist who has distinguished himself in the world of theatre. He studied at a major Parisian high school, Louis-le-Grand or Henri IV, and then went on to study law. After completing his law studies, Achard entered a lawyer's office, while taking courses at the Conservatoire de Paris. After one year, he was awarded the First Prizes in singing and opéra comique.

Subsequently, Achard was hired by the Théâtre-Lyrique, then directed by Léon Carvalho. There he interpreted Tobias, alongside Pauline Lauters, in Le Billet de Marguerite by Gevaert, play premiered on 7 October 1854.

== Bibliography ==
- Vachet, Adolphe (1910). Nos lyonnais d'hier : 1831-1910 (in French). Lyon: Aux Chartreux..
