= World NGO Day =

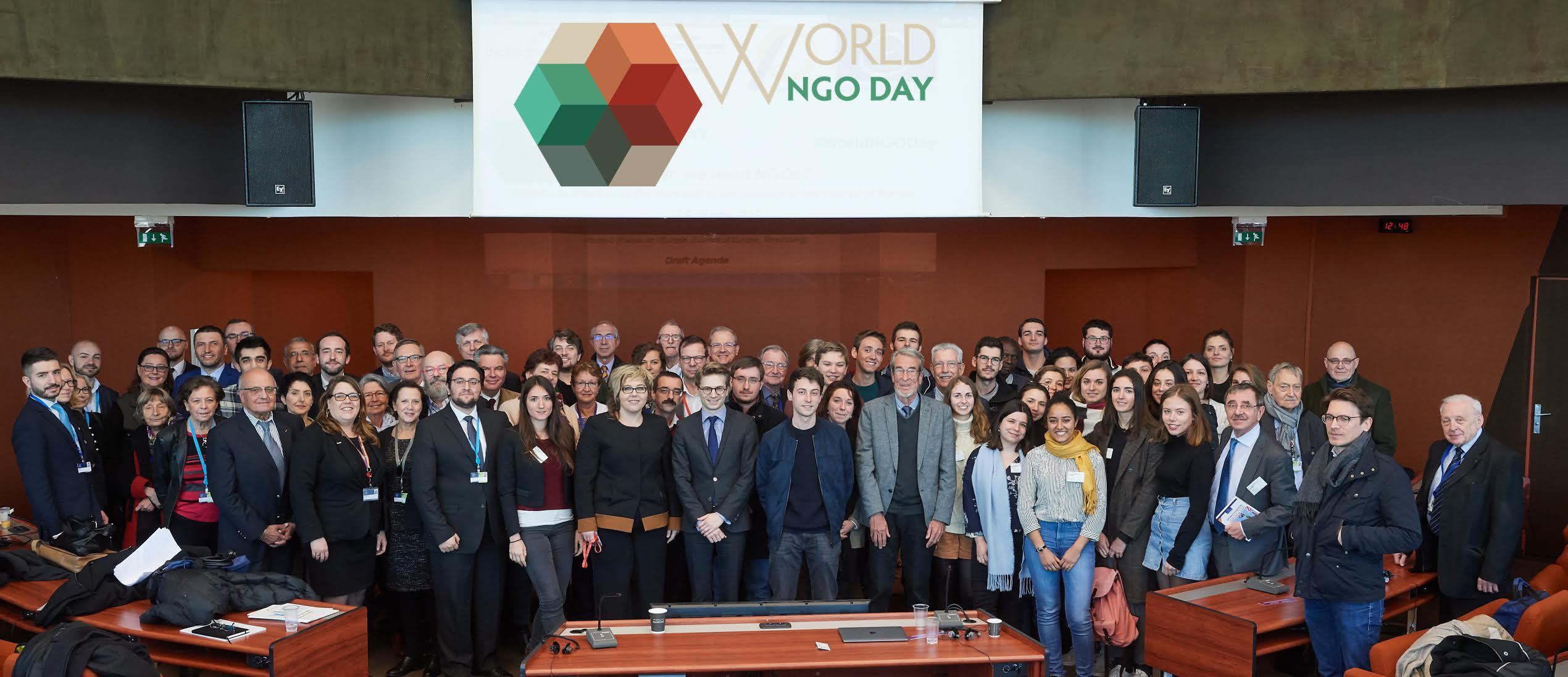
- World NGO Day 2019 at the Council of Europe in Strasbourg, France, with the day's founder Mārcis Skadmanis.
- Type: International
- Significance: Highlighting the importance of NGOs, honoring their employees and volunteers.
- Date: February 27
- Frequency: Annual

World NGO Day is an international day observed annually on February 27. Its purpose is to highlight the importance of non-governmental organizations (NGOs), associations, and foundations, honor their employees and volunteers, and promote public involvement in strengthening civil society. This day is actively celebrated in over 145 countries across all six inhabited continents.

== History ==
The concept of World NGO Day was created and initiated in 2009 by Latvian-British lawyer and philanthropist Mārcis Skadmanis. He initially developed this initiative during his studies at the Turība University in Riga, and later continued its international advancement in London, United Kingdom. Initially, thanks to the support of the Civic Alliance - Latvia, it was recognized in 2010 by 12 Baltic Sea Region countries at the X Baltic Sea NGO Forum.

Internationally, the day was first officially launched and marked on February 27, 2014, in Helsinki, Finland. This historic inaugural forum was supported by the Ministry for Foreign Affairs of Finland and attended by representatives of the United Nations (UN), UNESCO, and the European Union, including the then-head of the UN Development Programme and former Prime Minister of New Zealand, Helen Clark.

Since 2017, the European External Action Service (EEAS) and other global leaders have officially highlighted this day in their annual statements, and since 2024 it has been officially included in the European Union's list of recognized international days.

In Lithuania, on 8 June 2023, the Seimas (Lithuanian Parliament) became the first national parliament in the world to officially recognize World NGO Day by amending the Law on Days of Remembrance (Lithuanian: Atmintinų dienų įstatymas), designating 27 February as World NGO Day (Lithuanian: Pasaulinė NVO diena). The amendments were approved with 94 votes in favor, 1 against, and 10 abstentions.

In Latvia, since 2025, February 27 has been officially recognized as World NGO Day, with the Saeima (Latvian Parliament) including it in the law "On Holidays, Remembrance and Observance Days".

== Mission and significance ==
World NGO Day has several core objectives:

- Highlight and honor: Celebrate the global contributions of NGOs in areas such as health, education, human rights, and environmental protection.
- Remembrance: Commemorate NGO workers who have lost their lives or suffered while carrying out their professional and mission duties.
- Collaboration and education: Foster stronger cooperation between the non-governmental sector and the public or private sectors, educate the public about the role of these organizations, and encourage volunteering.
