= Louis Bancel (sculptor) =

French sculptor

Louis Bancel (26 September, 1926 – 2 December, 1978) was a French sculptor born in Saint-Julien-Molin-Molette.

He was the husband of Chantal Bancel. He is the father of linguist Pierre Bancel, musician Marie Bancel, historian Nicolas Bancel and computer scientist Renaud Bancel.

== Biography ==
Bancel obtained his baccalaureate early and began to study Further Mathematics at the Lycée du Parc in Lyon, only to stop them at 17 when he decided to join the French Resistance.
After the war, his life in the resistance and his recent introduction to art history led him to drop the idea of a life as an engineer. After 3 years as an apprentice for the French sculptor Lucien Descombe in Lyon, he moved in Paris in 1948.

Citing moderns like Picasso, Matisse and Laurens, but also the primitive sculptures from the Cyclades, Bancel's work on forms and design gradually evolved towards purity and simplicity.

=== Memorial to the deportees of Buchenwald ===
Through his friend, painter Boris Taslitsky, Louis Bancel was asked in 1957 by the Association des déportés de Buchenwald-Dora to create the monument dedicated to the memory of the camp's victims. The monumental bronze sculpture (inaugurated April 5, 1964) now stands in Père Lachaise Cemetery, in the area dedicated to victims of the World War II. It stands on a granite support from the architect M. Romer (a deportee himself) engraved with a text from Louis Aragon:

Qu’à jamais ceci montre comme l'Homme dut tomber

Et comment le courage et le dévouement

Lui conservent son nom d'Homme.

(Let this forever show how the Man had to fall
And how courage and devotion
Maintain his name of Man)

== Sources ==
- GOUTTENOIRE Bernard, Dictionnaire des peintres et sculpteurs à Lyon aux XIXe et XXe siècles, Lyon, La Taillanderie, 2000.
- Société des Amis de Louis Aragon et Elsa Triolet, Faites entrer l'infini n°26, Paris, Société des Amis de Louis Aragon et Elsa Triolet, Decembre 1998.
- Monuments à la mémoire des déporté(e)s victimes des camps de concentration et d'extermination nazis, Mairie de Paris : Musée de la Résistance nationale, 2005
