= Louis Bancel (theologian) =

French theologian

Louis Bancel (1628 at Valence – 1685 at Avignon) was a French Dominican theologian.

== Life ==
When very young he entered the Dominican Order at Avignon. Even before his ordination to the priesthood he was appointed lector of philosophy. He afterwards taught theology at Avignon.

He was the first to receive the appointment to the chair of theology in the University of Avignon (1654). This chair he held till his death. He was elected several times Dean of the Theological Faculty and always presided at the public defence of the theses of the candidates for academical degrees.

He was also Synodal Examiner of the Diocese of Avignon, and Prefect of the Avignon legation.

== Works ==
He wrote: "Moralis D. Thomae, Doctoris Angelici ex omnibus ipsius operibus deprompta" (Avignon, 1677; Venice, 1723, 1757, 1758, 1780); and "Brevis universae theologiae cursus" (Avignon, 1684–92). As the author died while the third volume was in press, the editing of the work was finished by Joseph Patin, O.P. From the last tome was expunged a thesis maintaining as probable the salvation of unbaptized infants by the faith of their parents.

Unpublished manuscripts of "Opus integrum de Castitate" and "Opus de veritate solius religionis Christianae" were left with the Dominicans at Avignon.
