= TriMet rolling stock =

List of MAX and WES rolling stock used by Trimet

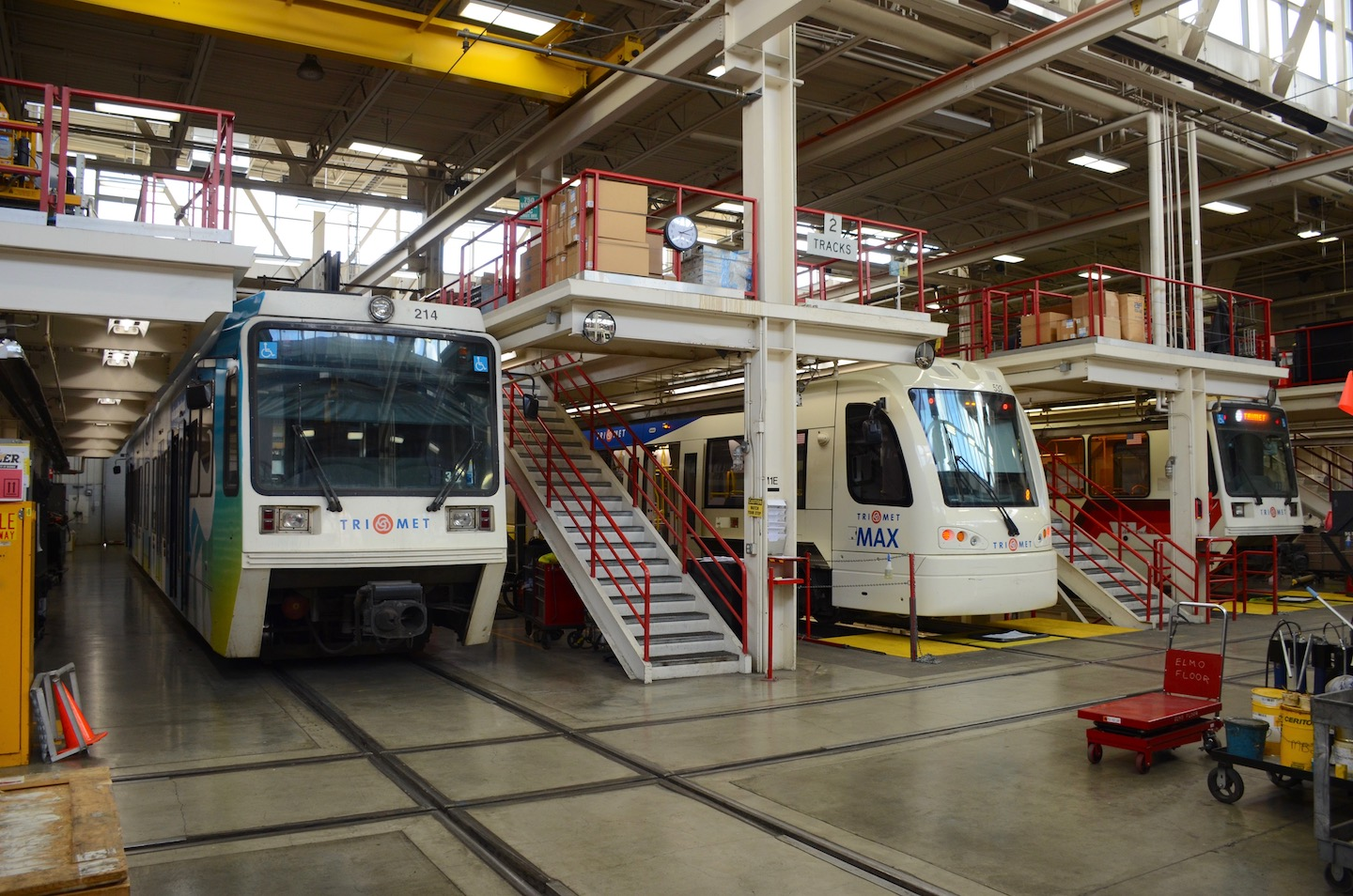
Interior of TriMet's Elmonica maintenance facility (located next to Elmonica/SW 170th station), one of two vehicle maintenance complexes for the MAX system

The TriMet transit system, serving the Portland metropolitan area in Oregon, owns and operates two different rail transit systems: a light rail system known as MAX, and a commuter rail system known as WES. The fleet of approximately 150 MAX electric light rail vehicles (LRVs) has included four different models, designated by TriMet as "Type 1" through "Type 6", with all but Type 1 still in use. All types are used on all of the MAX lines. The comparatively very small WES fleet includes three different types of diesel commuter rail cars.

== Light rail fleet ==
Rolling stock interiors

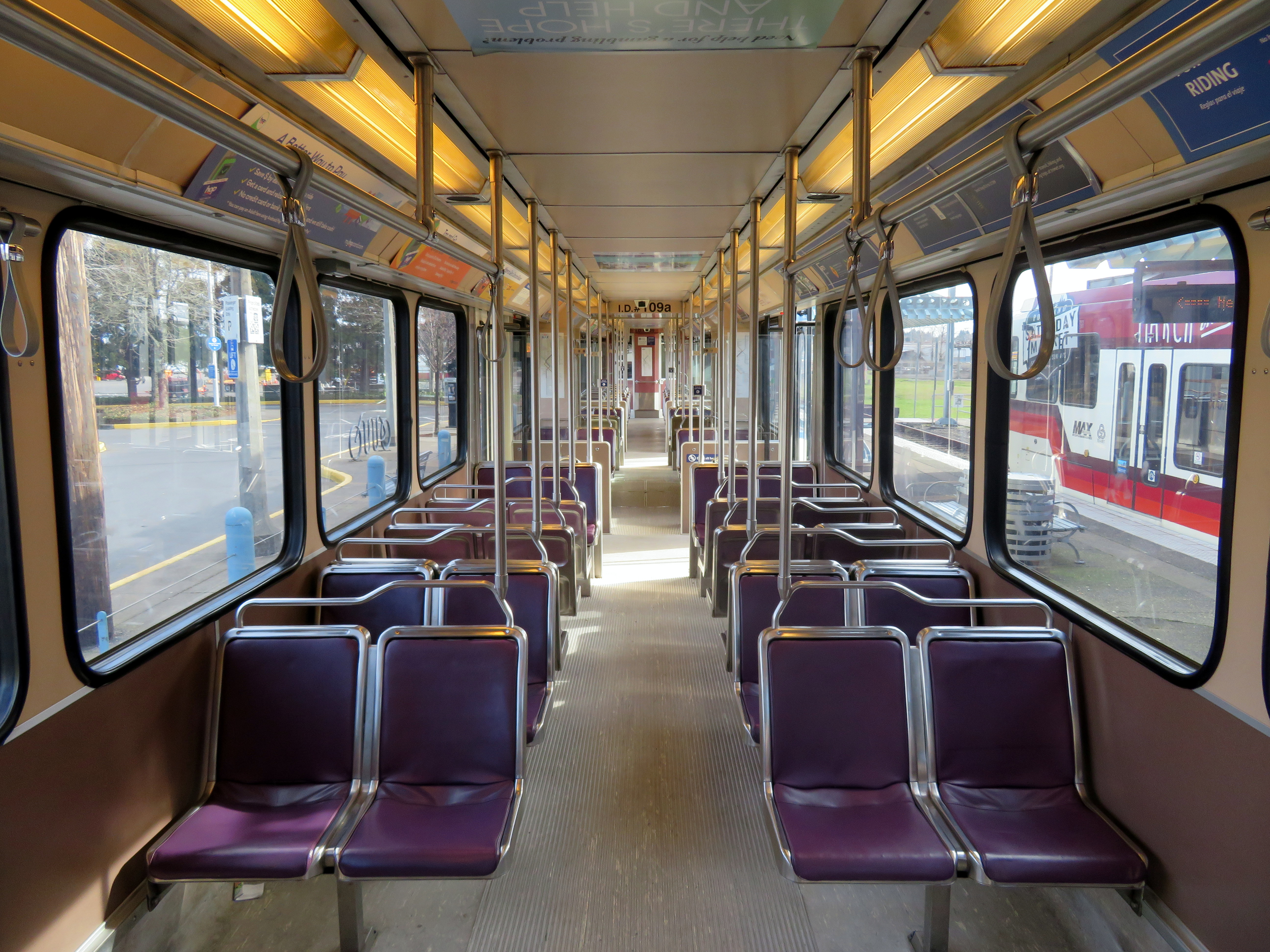
Type 1

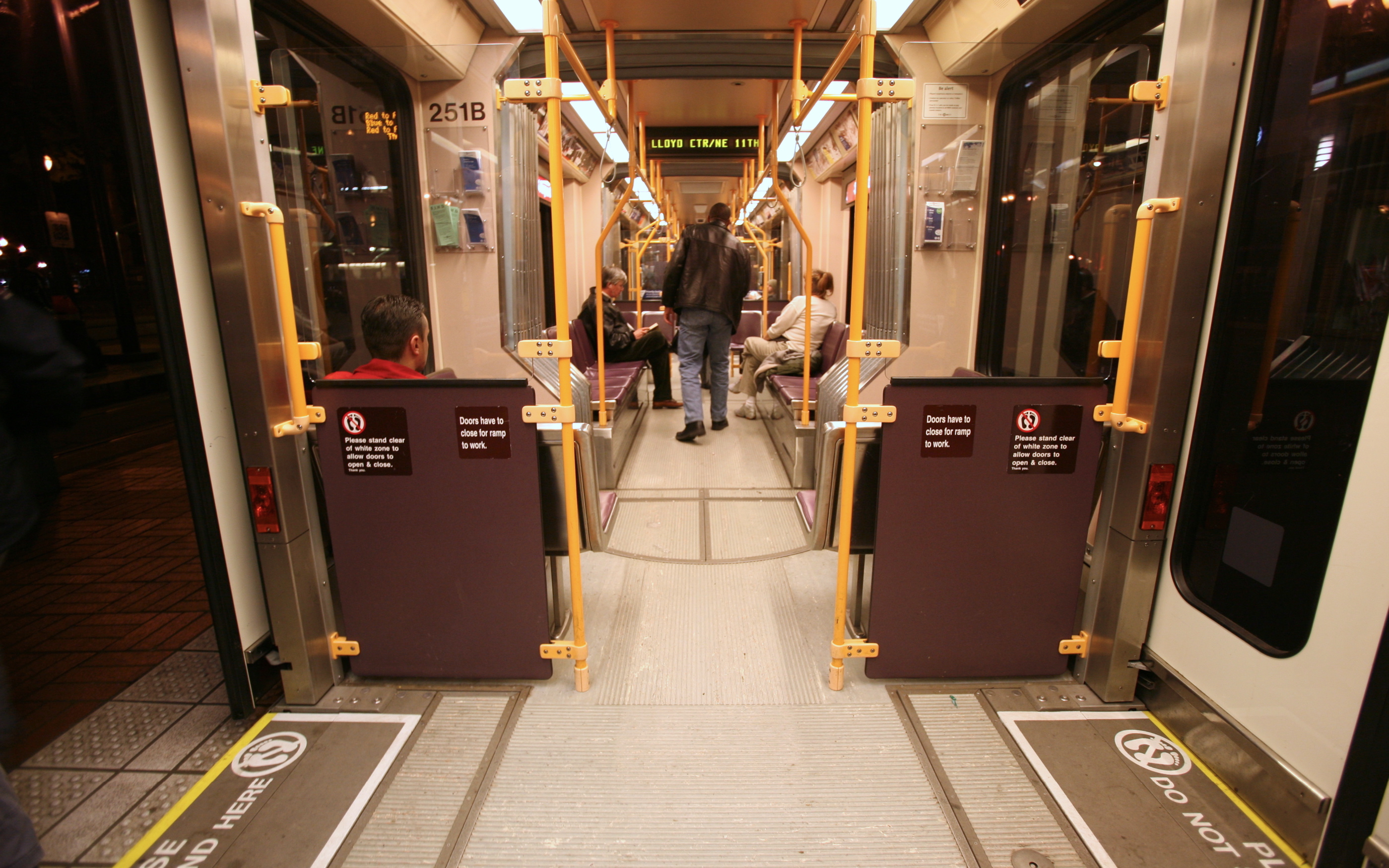
Type 2

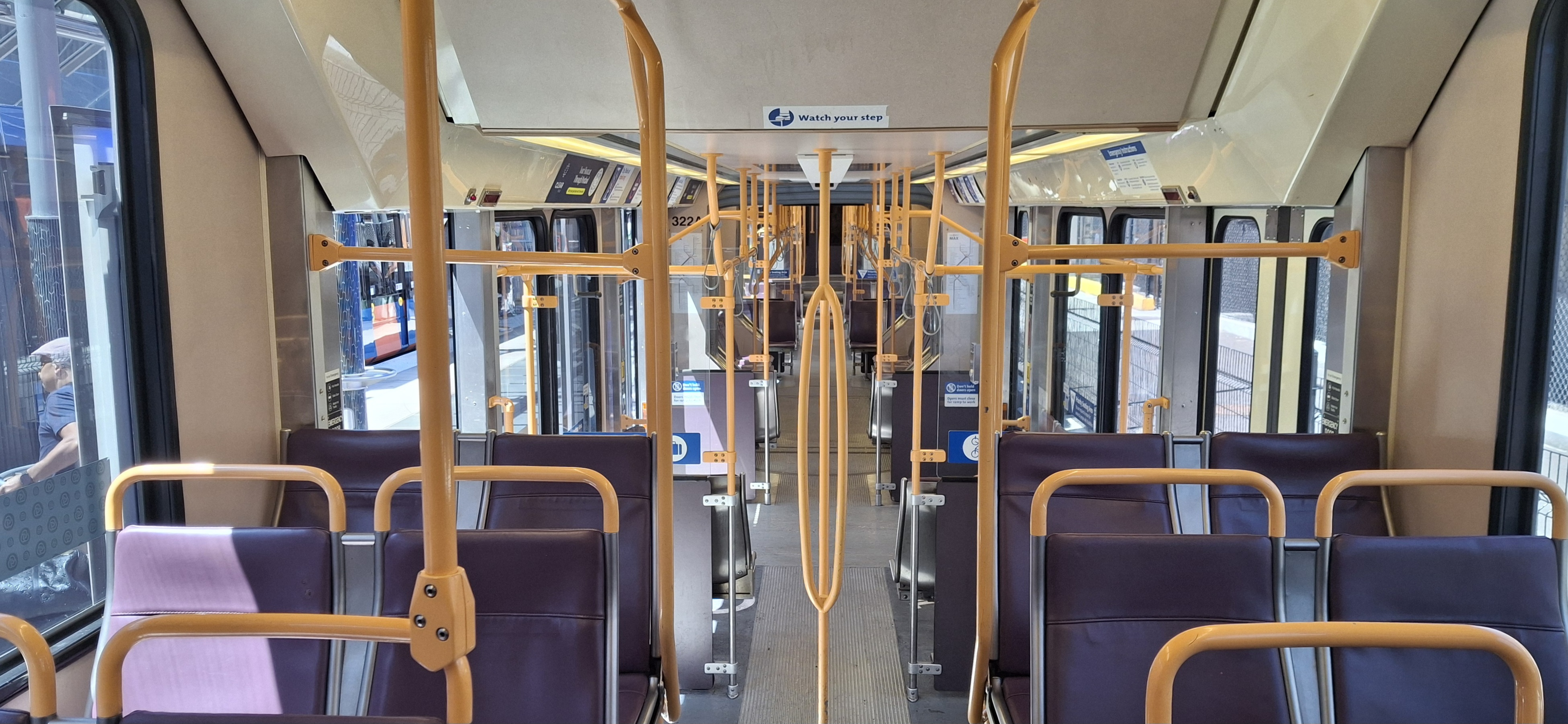
Type 3

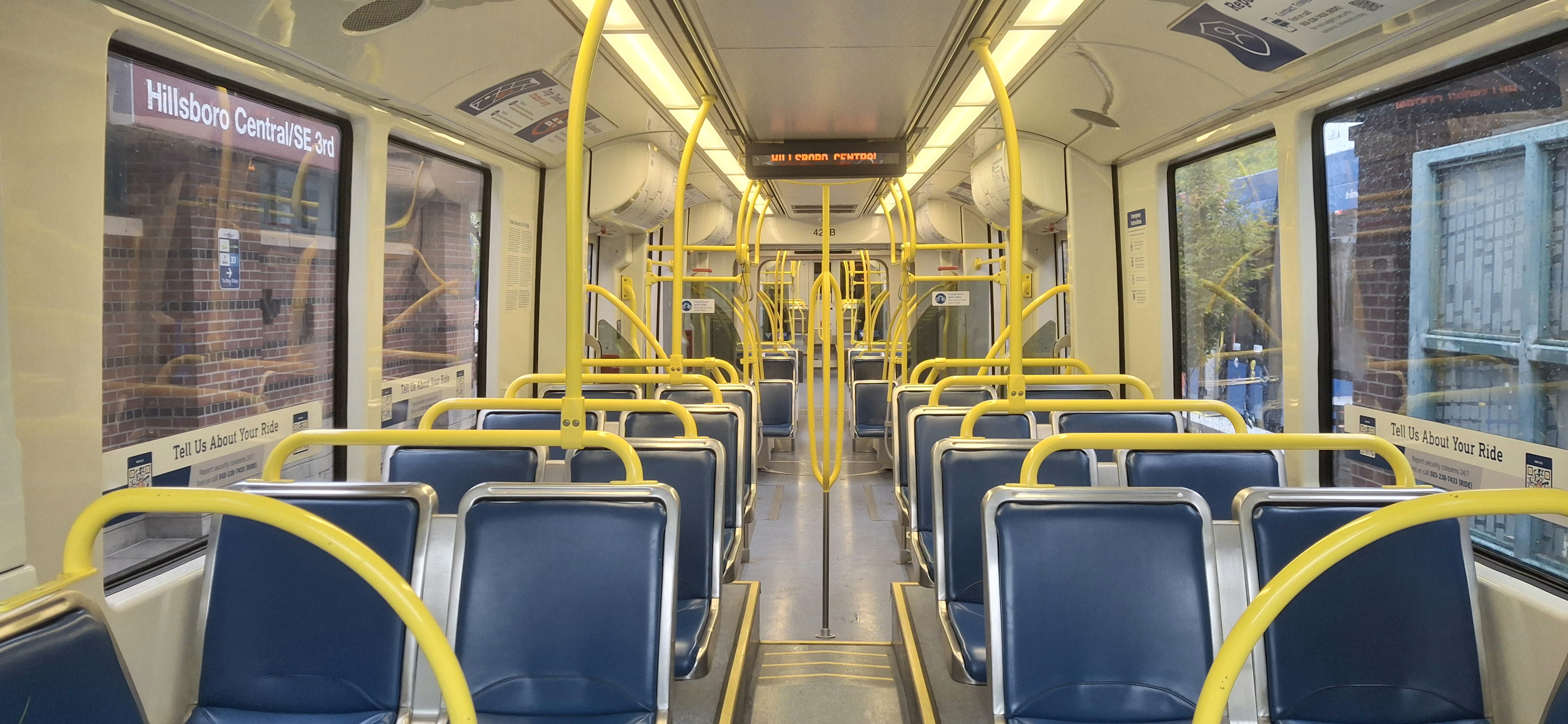
Type 4

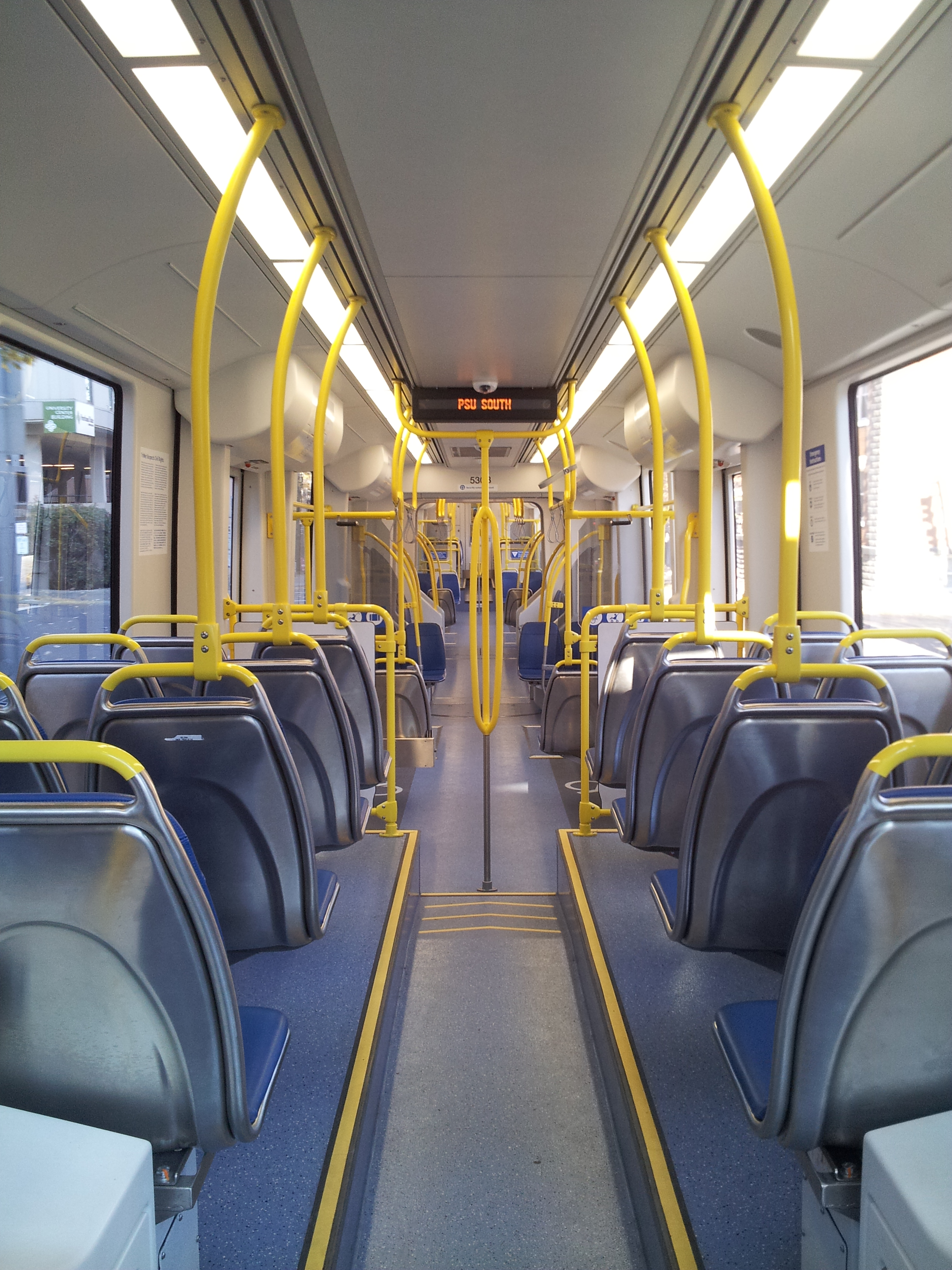
Type 5

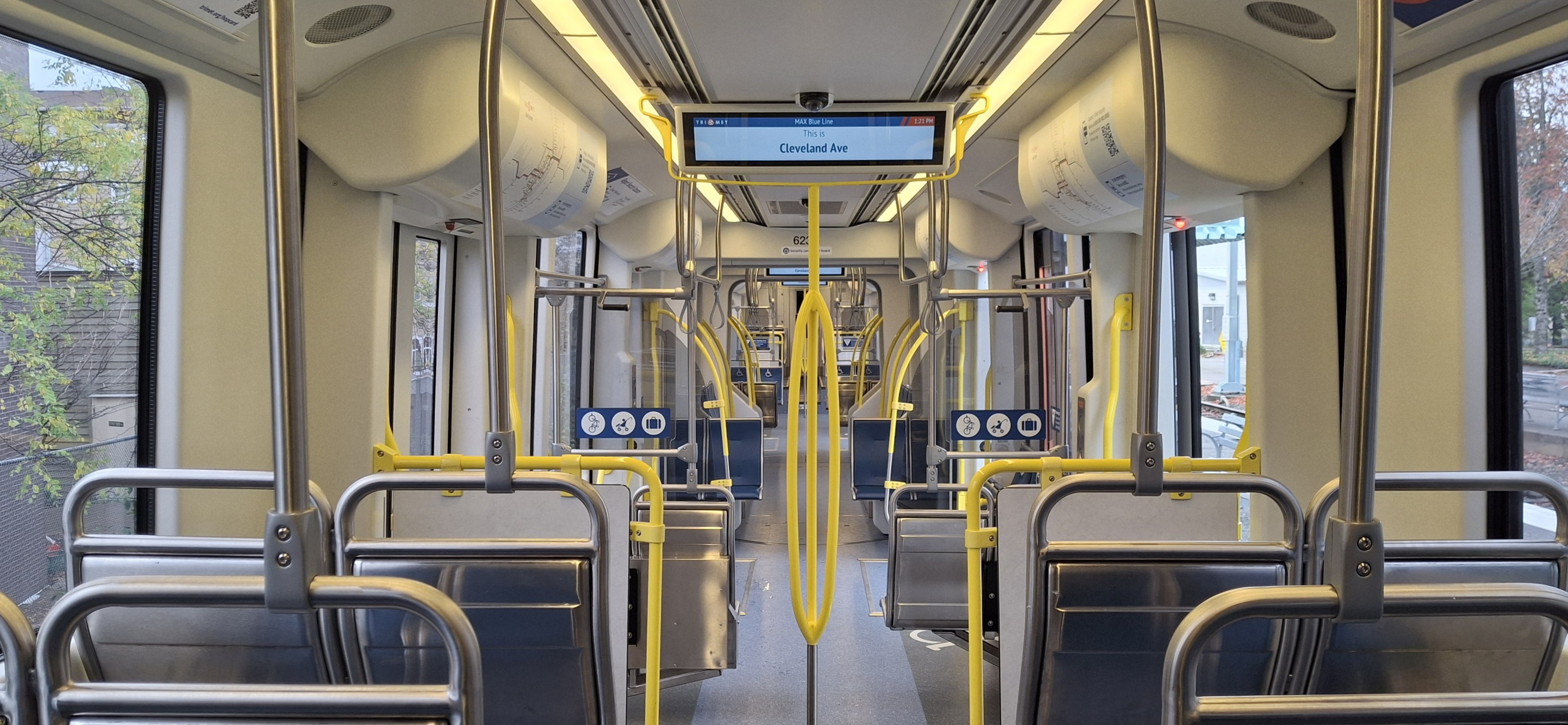
Type 6

Current fleet
Image	TriMet designation	Car numbers	Manufacturer	Model	First used	No. of seats/overall capacity	Quantity	Notes
	Type 2	201–252	Siemens	SD660	1997	64/166	52	Most LRVs were given a new paint-scheme wrap in 2024. Nos. 215, 231, and 241 were overhauled and repainted.
A MAX type 3 LRV wrapped in the phase 4 scheme.	Type 3	301–327	Siemens	SD660	2003	64/166	27	Most LRVs received a wrap in the new paint scheme. No. 315 was overhauled.
"Type 4" MAX vehicle (Siemens S70) no. 418 in service on the Blue Line.	Type 4	401–422	Siemens	S70	2009	68/172	22	Single-ended. Must be run in two-car sets.
Type 5 LRVs laying over on the Blue Line in Hillsboro, May 2015	Type 5	521–538	Siemens	S700 (Note: TriMet's "Type 5" cars were model S70 when purchased and placed in service, but in 2020 were retroactively redesignated as model S700 by Siemens.)	2015	72/186	18	Single-ended. Must be run in two-car sets.
	Type 6	601–630	Siemens	S700	2025	62/168	30	First two cars entered service on January 16, 2025. Are only able to couple to other Type 6 cars.
On order
	Type 6	(631–682)	Siemens	S700	(2029–2031)	62/168	52	Order placed March 2026, for eventual replacement of all Type 2 LRVs.

Retired fleet
Image	TriMet designation	Car numbers	Manufacturer	First used	No. of seats/overall capacity	Last used	Quantity	Notes
	Type 1	101–126	Bombardier	1986	76/166	2026	26	Built between 1983 and 1986, but all 26 entered service in 1986, when the MAX system opened. Three cars (102, 103, and 116) never received the body overhaul and remained in the original paint scheme until retired. No. 101 is preserved at the Oregon Electric Railway Museum.

Notes on capacities:

- The capacities given are for a single car; a two-car train has double the capacity.
- The Type 2 cars originally had 72 seats, but eight seats were later removed, to make space for bicycles.
- All of these capacity figures are based on "normal" loading conditions (defined as 4 standing passengers per square meter by industry standards); under so-called "crush" loading conditions (6-8 standees per m^{2}), all of these cars are capable of carrying many more passengers than stated here.

=== Type 1 ===
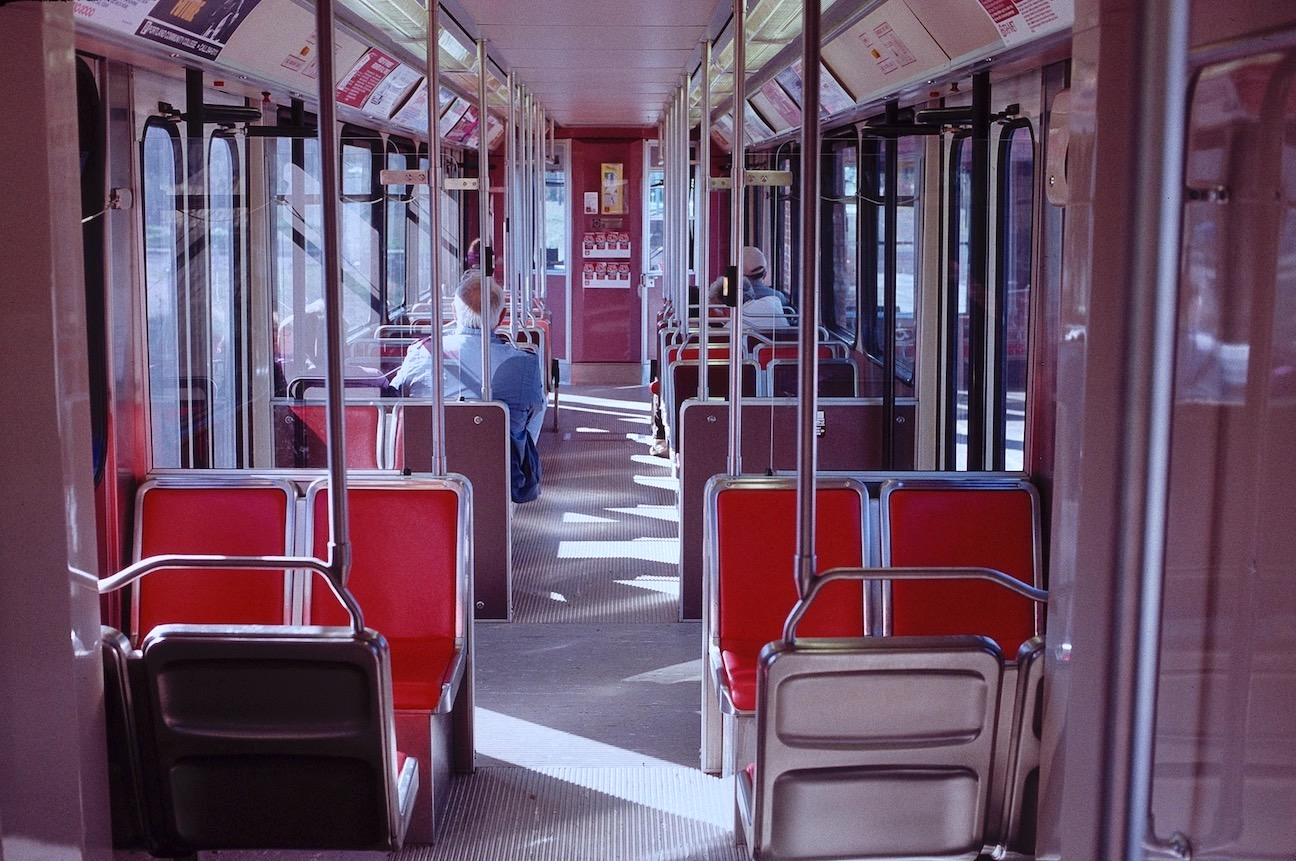
Interior of a Type 1 car in 1987, showing the original seat colors and the stop-request bell cords that were removed in 1994

The Type 1 cars were manufactured by a joint venture between Bombardier Corporation and La Brugeoise et Nivelles (BN; Bombardier would later acquire the company) and featured a raised floor with steps at the doors. TriMet had hoped that American firm Budd Corporation would bid on the contract, but the company backed out at the last minute. TriMet announced it would purchase an additional seven vehicles in August 1983, but a budget shortfall forced the agency to withdraw this proposal the following November. The cars were built, with some modifications for Portland, to a BN design that had previously been used – under license by Brazilian manufacturer Cobrasma^{(PT)} – for 68 rail cars for Rio de Janeiro. The electrical propulsion equipment was supplied by Brown, Boveri & Company. Bombardier built the frames in Quebec, but its factory in Barre, Vermont, manufactured the majority of each car, with 80 percent of the production and assembly taking place in Barre. The first vehicle was completed at the factory in late 1983, and two cars were sent to the federal government's Transportation Test Center in Colorado for testing in the last weeks of that year. The first car arrived in Portland in 1984. The Type 1 cars were the only light rail cars in TriMet's fleet that lacked regenerative braking capability.

The Type 1 cars were delivered without air-conditioning, but it was added to all cars during a retrofit in 1997–98. These cars were originally equipped with stop-request bell cords (as are commonly found on American transit buses), which passengers needed to pull to signal the operator that they wanted to get off at the next stop, similar to a typical bus or some streetcars. As ridership increased, the stop request feature was relegated to certain lighter used stations during periods of lighter traffic. Finally, in 1994, the bell cords were removed after TriMet adopted an operating practice of having MAX trains stop at every station at all times. The bodies of the Type 1 vehicles included cutaway areas by each truck, for maintenance access. In 1995, TriMet began installing wheel skirts to cover these, to reduce noise, and said that these would be included on all LRVs purchased in the future.

For their first 30 years (until 2016) the Type 1 cars had roll-type, printed destination signs. The Type 1 cars were the only MAX cars whose rollsigns were hand-cranked. Because of the time-consuming process to change the signs, only the sign on the exposed end of the car in a two-car train was changed to the correct destination. After the 2001 opening of the Red Line, the side signs only listed the designated route color (such as "Blue Line") rather than a destination, and the sign on the coupled end of each car in a two-car train was left blank. A two-year program that began in October 2014 and was completed in September 2016 gradually replaced all of the rollsigns in the Type 1 cars (as well as those in the Types 2 and 3) with digital, LED-type destination signs.

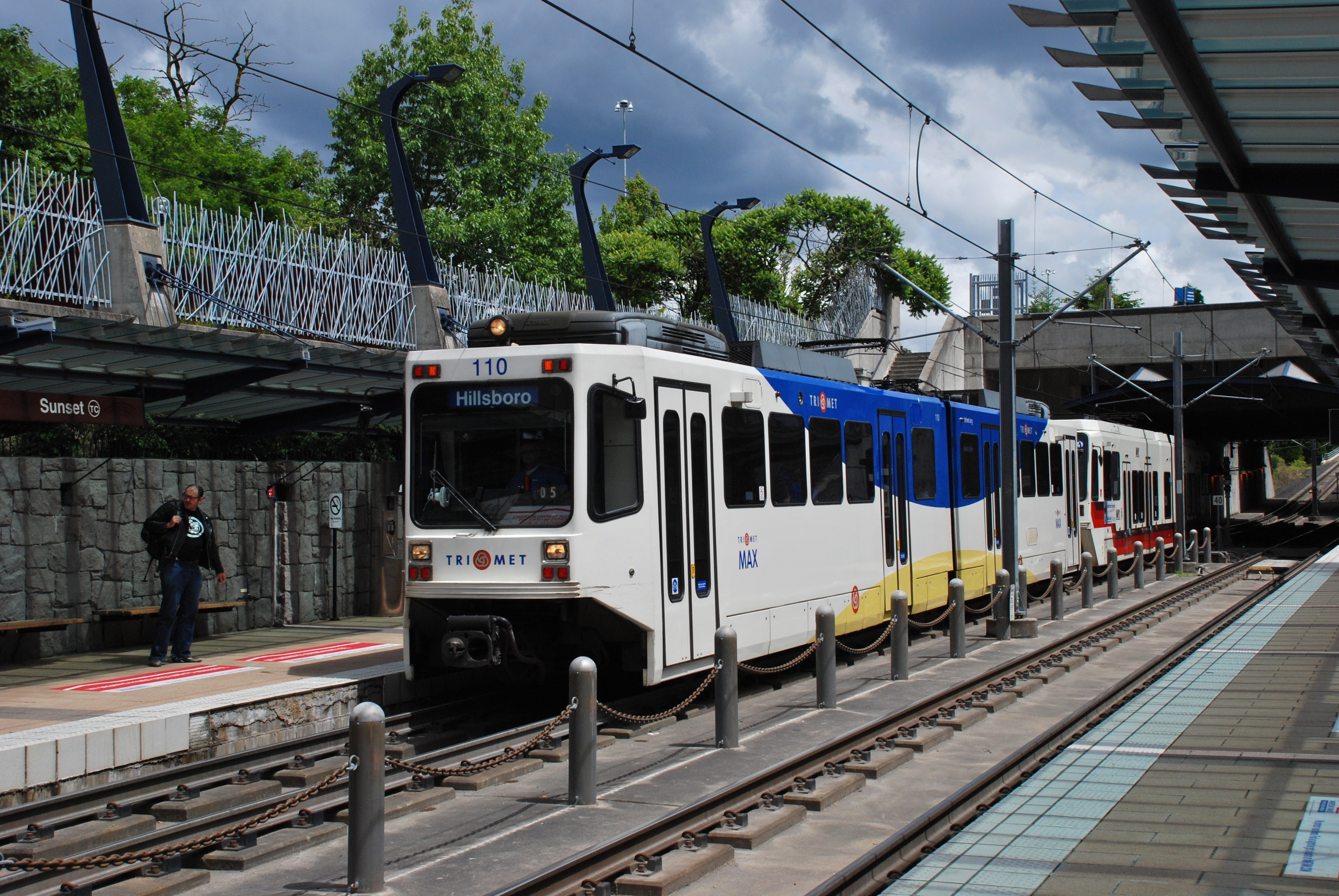
An overhauled Type 1 in the second MAX paint scheme. By the mid-2010s, most Type 1 cars looked like this.

Starting in 2003, TriMet began a program to refurbish the bodies of the Type 1 cars, carried out by its own employees. Known as the Body Overhaul program, it included extensive body renovation, replacement of all windows, repainting into the new paint scheme the agency adopted in 2002, and minor interior refurbishment, but not any work on the cars' mechanical or propulsion equipment. The program proceeded at a slower pace than originally anticipated because of staffing issues, with only two cars being worked on at a time, and each taking one to two years. By 2018, when only 23 of the 26 cars had been completed, TriMet had terminated the program because, by that time, the Type 1 fleet was only a few years away from retirement. The last overhauled car, No. 112, returned to service in April 2018. The three cars that never received the body overhaul and repainting were Nos. 102, 103 and 116.

In February 2018, TriMet announced its intention to purchase replacements for all 26 Type 1 cars. In July 2019, TriMet did place such an order, for 26 new cars which it designated Type 6 (see below).

Retirement began in October 2023, when car 102, one of the three which was never refurbished, was retired following the delivery of the first several new Type 6 cars. In June 2025, TriMet donated car 101 to the Oregon Electric Railway Museum and held a farewell event on July 8 at its Ruby Junction yard, where contest winners viewed the car before its planned move to the museum.

The Type 1 series was officially retired in April 2026, with the last day of service being April 2 (when only car 113 operated in service) and a special farewell event taking place on April 18. In July 2026, car 122 was moved to North Portland to be retrofitted by an organization named AfroVillage as a community outreach center, on which started construction in September 2026.

=== Type 2 ===
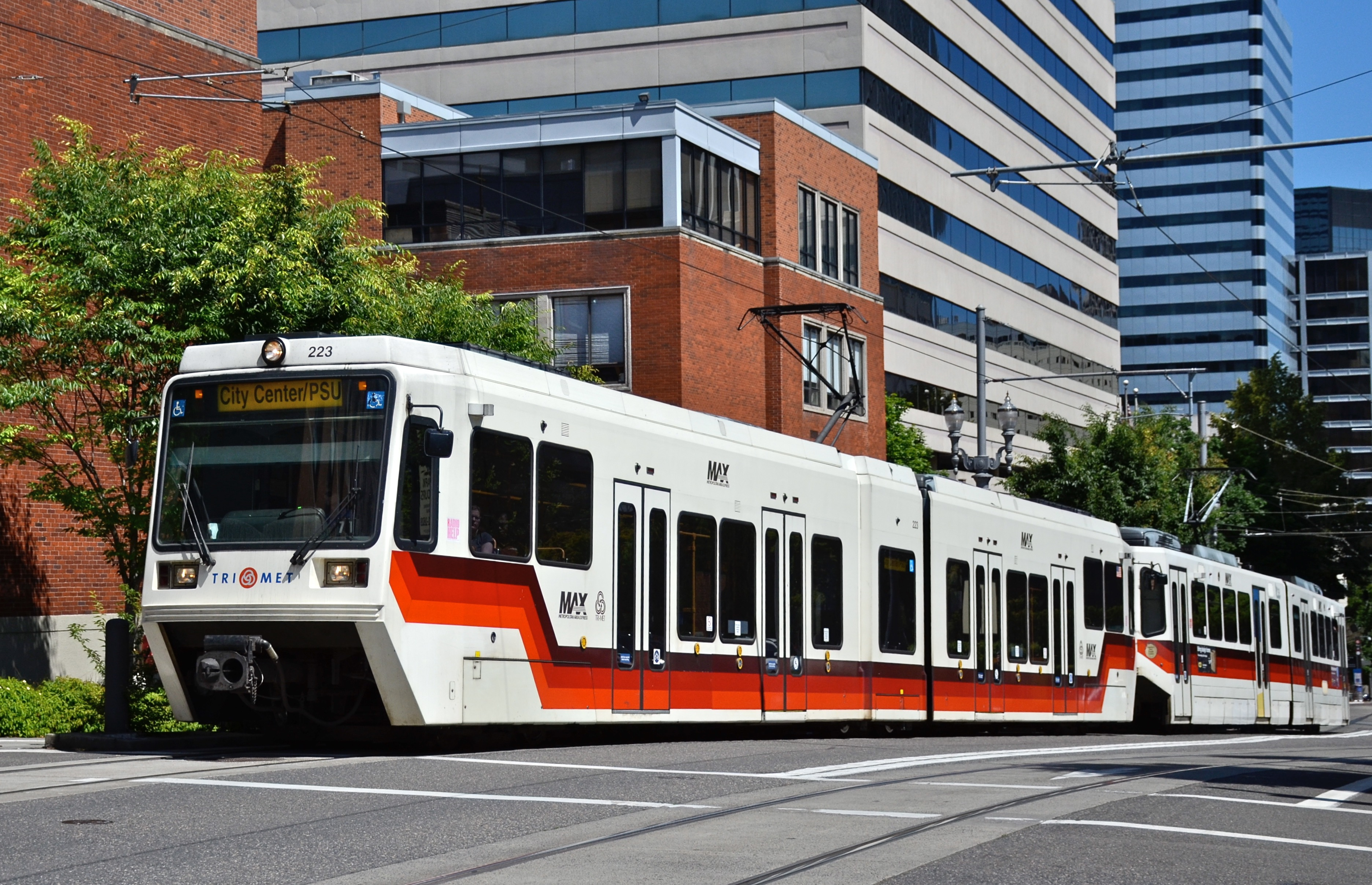
A MAX train composed of one low-floor car and one high-floor car on the Portland Transit Mall in 2015

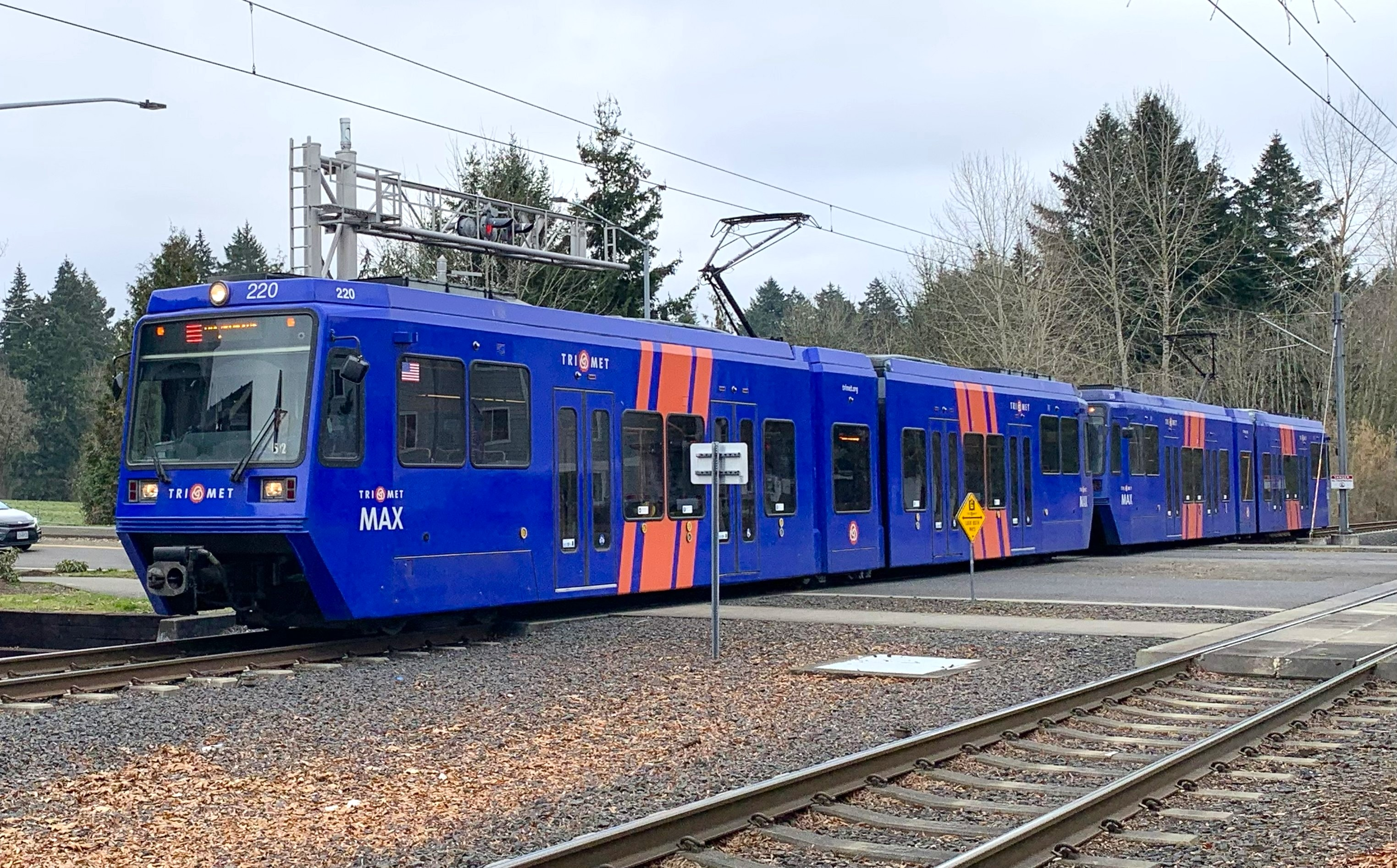
Example of a Type 2 train wrapped in the newest paint scheme

With the partial opening of Westside MAX in 1997, TriMet's "Type 2" light rail vehicles were introduced. The Siemens model SD660 (originally SD600, but retroactively redesignated SD660 in 1998) have a low-floor design, a first for light rail vehicles in North America, digital next-station reader boards and a slightly more open floor plan. The floor is nearly level with the platforms, and small ramps called "bridge plates" extend (on request) from two of the four doors, enabling passengers in wheelchairs to roll on and off of the vehicle easily. These permitted the elimination of wheelchair lifts that had been located at every station and were time-consuming to use. From 1997 until their retirement, high-floor Type 1 cars were always paired with a low-floor Type 2 or 3 car so that each train was wheelchair-accessible.

The first low-floor light rail vehicle was delivered in 1996 and first used in service on August 31, 1997. The new vehicles also came equipped with air-conditioning, a feature originally lacking from the Type 1 vehicles. The initial order of 39 Type 2 vehicles was expanded, in stages, to a total of 52 vehicles.

Some of the later models of light rail vehicles had automatic passenger counters retrofitted; in these models, they are on the floor of the doorways.

In 2001–02, TriMet modified the interior of the Type 2 cars to add space for bicycles. Eight seats per vehicle were removed and replaced—in four places per car—with hooks from which a bicycle can be hung. All later cars have been delivered from the manufacturer with these bike hooks already installed. In 2014–2016, the rollsign-type destination signs in these cars and the almost-identical Type 3 cars were gradually replaced with digital signs in a two-year conversion program.

=== Type 3 ===
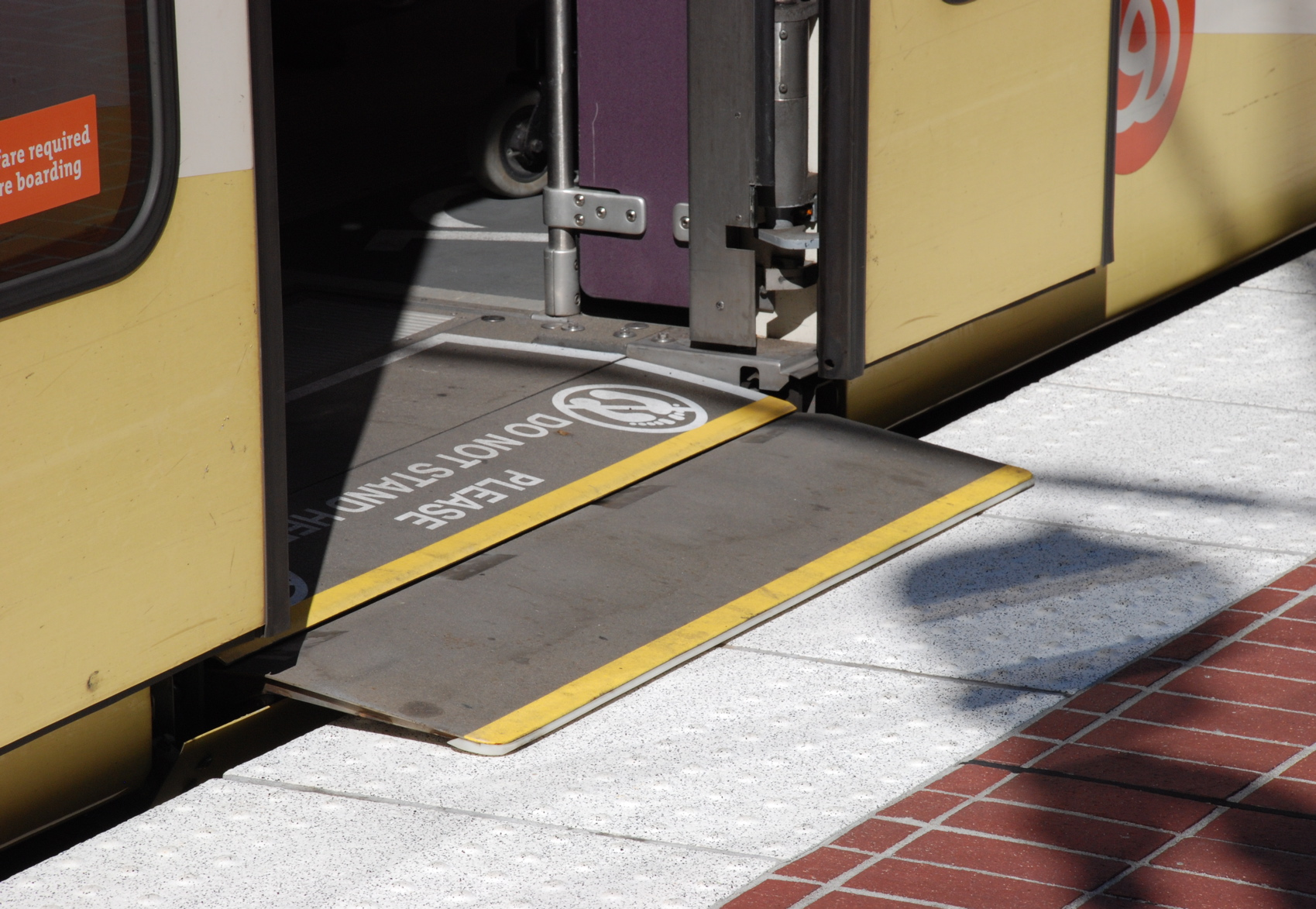
An extended doorway bridge plate, or wheelchair ramp, in a low-floor MAX car

The second series of Siemens SD660 cars, TriMet's "Type 3" MAX light rail vehicle, are outwardly identical to the Type 2 cars in design, the primary difference being various technical upgrades. Siemens installed an improved air-conditioning system, more ergonomic seats and automatic passenger counters using photoelectric sensors above the doorways. The Type 3 cars were the first to wear the transit agency's newer (2002-adopted) paint scheme. Purchased for the opening of the Yellow Line in May 2004, delivery of the Type 3 series began in February 2003, and the vehicles began to enter service in September 2003.

=== Type 4 ===
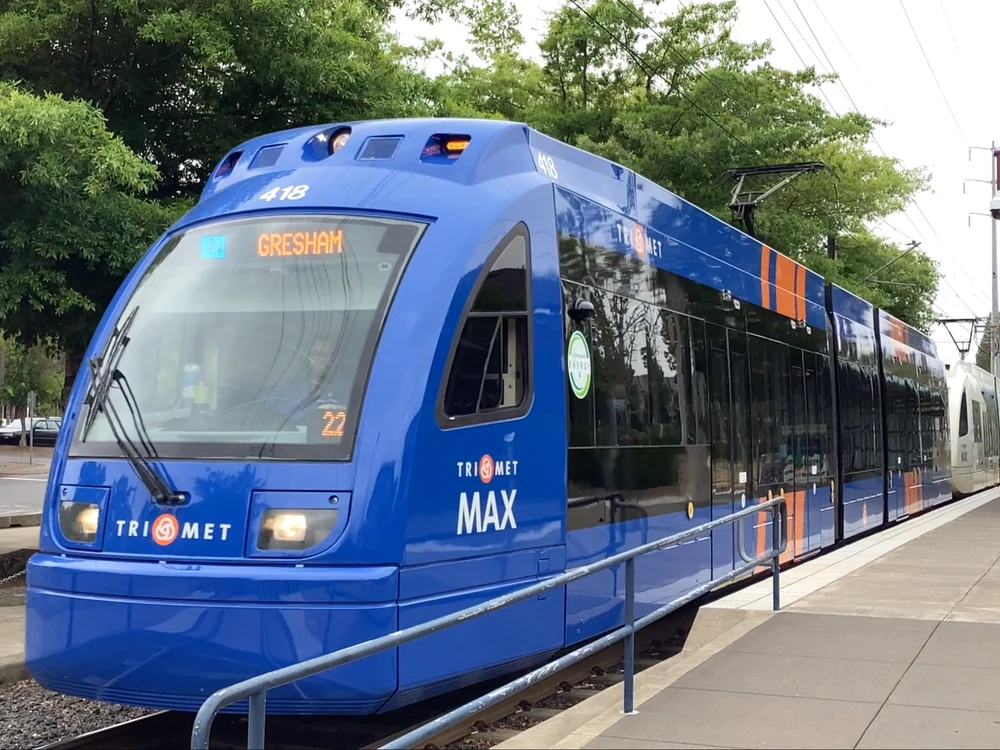
"Type 4" MAX vehicle (Siemens S70) no. 418 in service on the Blue Line. This unit was the first Type 4 to be repainted into TriMet's current paint scheme.

Twenty-two new Siemens S70 low-floor cars, designated Type 4, were purchased in conjunction with the I-205 and Portland Mall MAX projects. They feature a more streamlined design than previous models, have more seating and are lighter in weight and therefore more energy-efficient. They can only operate in pairs, since each car has just one operator's cab, at the "A" end (the "B" end has additional passenger seating). At about 95 feet (28.96 m) long, they are about three feet longer than Type 2 and Type 3 cars, which were 92 feet (28.04 m). The Type 4 MAX cars began to enter service in August 2009.

The Type 4 cars were the first to use LED-type destination signs. On the rollsign-type destination signs used—until 2016—on the Type 1, 2 and 3 cars the designated route color (blue, green, red, or yellow) was shown as a colored background under white or black text, while in the LED signs the route color is indicated by a colored square at the left end of the display, and all text is orange lettering against a black background. In October 2014, TriMet began a two-year program to gradually replace all rollsigns in its MAX fleet with LED signs, affecting a total of 105 cars (and four signs per car). The conversion program was completed in September 2016 (with the last use of a rollsign in service being on August 19).

=== Type 5 ===
The second series of Siemens S70 cars, TriMet's "Type 5" MAX vehicle, were purchased in conjunction with the Portland–Milwaukie (MAX Orange Line) project, but are used on all lines in the system. These vehicles include some improvements over the Type 4 cars, including a less-cramped interior seating layout and improvements to the air-conditioning system and wheelchair ramps. TriMet placed the order for the Type 5 cars with Siemens in April 2012 and they began to be delivered in September 2014. The first two cars entered service on April 27, 2015, and all but the last two had entered service by the time the Orange Line opened in September 2015. The fleet numbers for the Type 5 cars are 521–538 (at the time the first cars were built, fleet numbers 511–514 were in use for the Vintage Trolley cars). In 2020, Siemens retroactively rebranded TriMet's Type 5 cars as model S700 instead of S70.

=== Type 6 ===
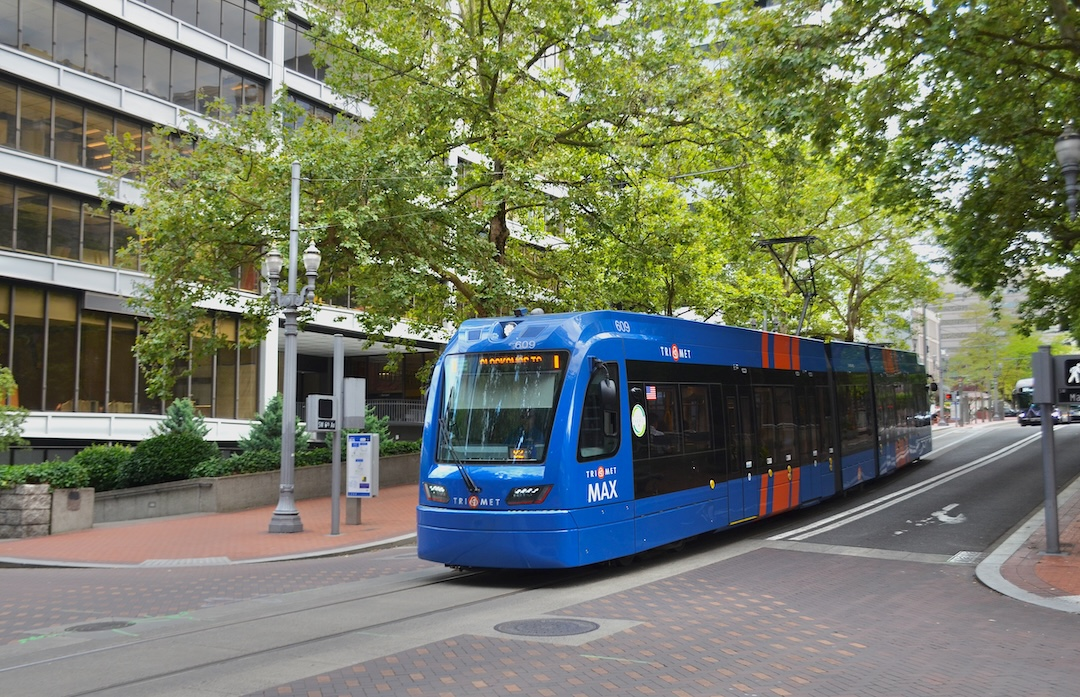
Car 609 running as a single car on the Portland Transit Mall, downtown. The Type 6 cars are first TriMet S70/S700 LRVs with operating cabs at both ends.

Ordered in 2019 as replacements for the Type 1 cars, TriMet's Type 6 are Siemens model S700 (the S700 is a 2019 redesignation by Siemens of the version of its S70 model that resulted from a 2013 redesign of the center truck, of which TriMet's Type 5 cars were the first built by Siemens). The initial order, finalized in July 2019, was for 26 cars, but the contract includes options for additional cars, for service expansion and the proposed Southwest Corridor MAX line, if built. Although identical to the Type 5 cars in most respects, the Type 6 has several new additions, including operating cabs at both ends, improved next-station displays, and extra LEDs to indicate usable doors. Type 6 cars also feature a new paint scheme that TriMet introduced on its bus fleet in early 2019: overall blue with orange stripes. They are only able to couple to other Type 6 cars. The first car was originally expected to arrive around spring 2022 and the last of the initial 26 in mid-2023. The order was increased to 30 cars in June 2021. Car 601 arrived at Ruby Junction Yard in December 2022, followed by 604 in March 2023. TriMet stated that all Type 6 cars would undergo a 1,500-mile "burn-in" testing on the system before entering service. The first two cars entered service on January 16, 2025. In March 2026, TriMet placed an order for an additional 52 Type 6 LRVs, the single largest order in the MAX system's history. Intended to replace all 52 Type 2 LRVs, the additional Type 6 cars are due for delivery beginning in mid-2029.

=== Ice-cutting pantographs ===
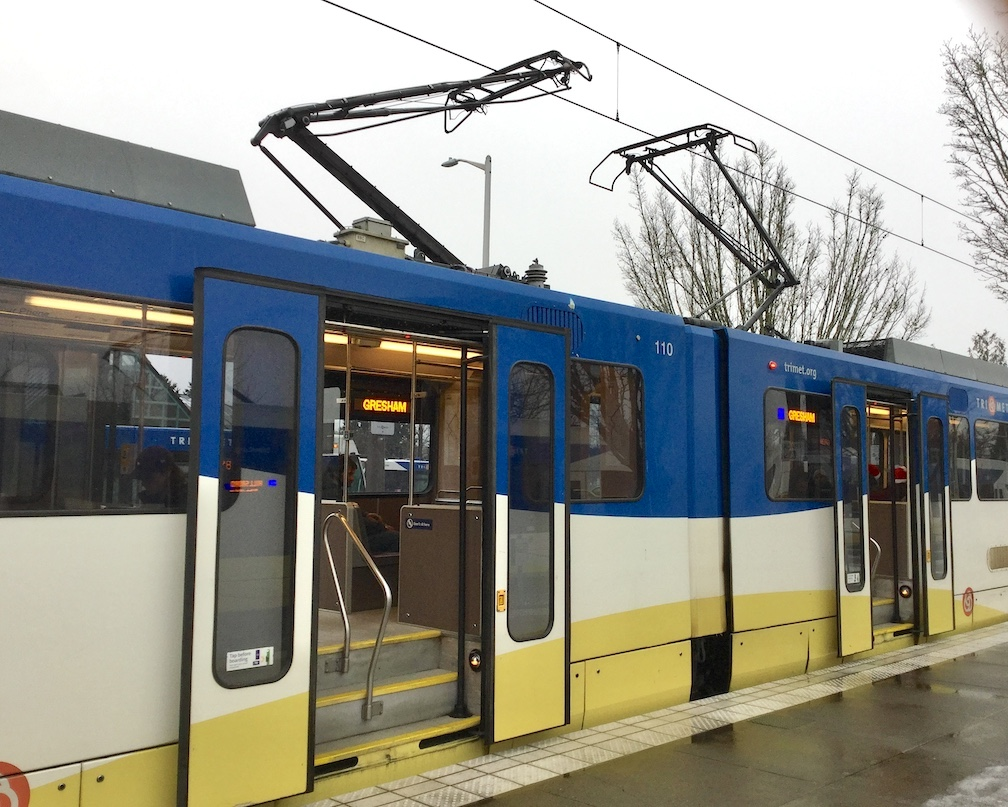
Ice-cutting pantograph of a Type 1 LRV in use (on the right) alongside the regular pantograph

After a January 2004 Portland-area snow and ice storm that shut down the entire two-line MAX system for a day and a half, TriMet decided to install second, ice-cutting pantographs on some Type 1 light rail vehicles, which it would run (empty) all night under certain weather conditions, to prevent ice from building up on the overhead lines. Unlike the regular pantographs, these "ice cutters" do not draw power from the overhead wire, but instead are fitted with a head designed to scrape ice off of the wire. Six cars (Nos. 107–112) were equipped in 2006, and a seventh (113) in early 2018. In early 2019, TriMet installed ice-cutting pantographs on all 18 of its Type 5 cars. On the Type 5 cars, the ice-cutting pantographs are located near the outer end of each car, near the operating cab. The 26 Type 6 cars that were ordered in 2019 and were in the process of being delivered in 2023–2024 are also equipped with second pantographs for ice cutting.

=== Mid-life overhaul of Type 2/Type 3 cars ===
In March 2019, after a competitive bidding process, TriMet signed an $88.3-million contract with Siemens Mobility to carry out a heavy "mid-life overhaul" of all 79 of its Siemens SD660 LRVs (52 TriMet Type 2 and 27 TriMet Type 3), over a period of seven years, to extend their lives. The contract covered options for potential additional work, to be approved or declined by TriMet at its discretion, which would increase the total value to $105.6 million if all options are chosen. The work is taking place at one of two large Siemens plants in the Sacramento metropolitan area. (Siemens was also the manufacturer of these LRVs.) However, amid the COVID-19 pandemic and supply-chain disruptions, the work has proceeded more slowly than originally expected, and as of December 2023 only two LRVs had returned from Sacramento after being overhauled and only two other cars had been sent to Sacramento for the overhaul (the latter being cars 231 and 241 in summer 2022).

The inside of a refurbished Type 2 car

One car of each type was chosen to be a prototype for the work, because the work on the Type 2 vehicles, which are older, would be slightly more extensive. Cars 315 and 215 were sent to Siemens in April and September 2019, respectively. The 77 subsequent overhauls were originally planned to be carried out in the Portland metropolitan area, at former United Streetcar facilities owned by Oregon Iron Works, but those plans were later dropped, and all 79 overhauls are to be carried out at Siemens's own facilities in Sacramento. The first overhauled LRV, car 315, returned to TriMet in December 2019 and, after extensive testing and evaluation, returned to service in July 2021. Car 215, the second (and first Type 2) to be overhauled, did not return from Sacramento until October 2023, the work having been delayed by the COVID-19 pandemic, among other factors. The work includes repainting into TriMet's 2019-introduced paint scheme of blue with orange stripes, and car 315 was the first MAX car of any series to receive that livery. However, with the overhaul program years behind schedule, TriMet decided to speed up the application of the newer paint scheme via a temporary vinyl "wrap" given to Type 2 and Type 3 LRVs starting in March 2024. Only four cars had received the mid-life overhaul as of mid-2025.

== Commuter rail fleet ==
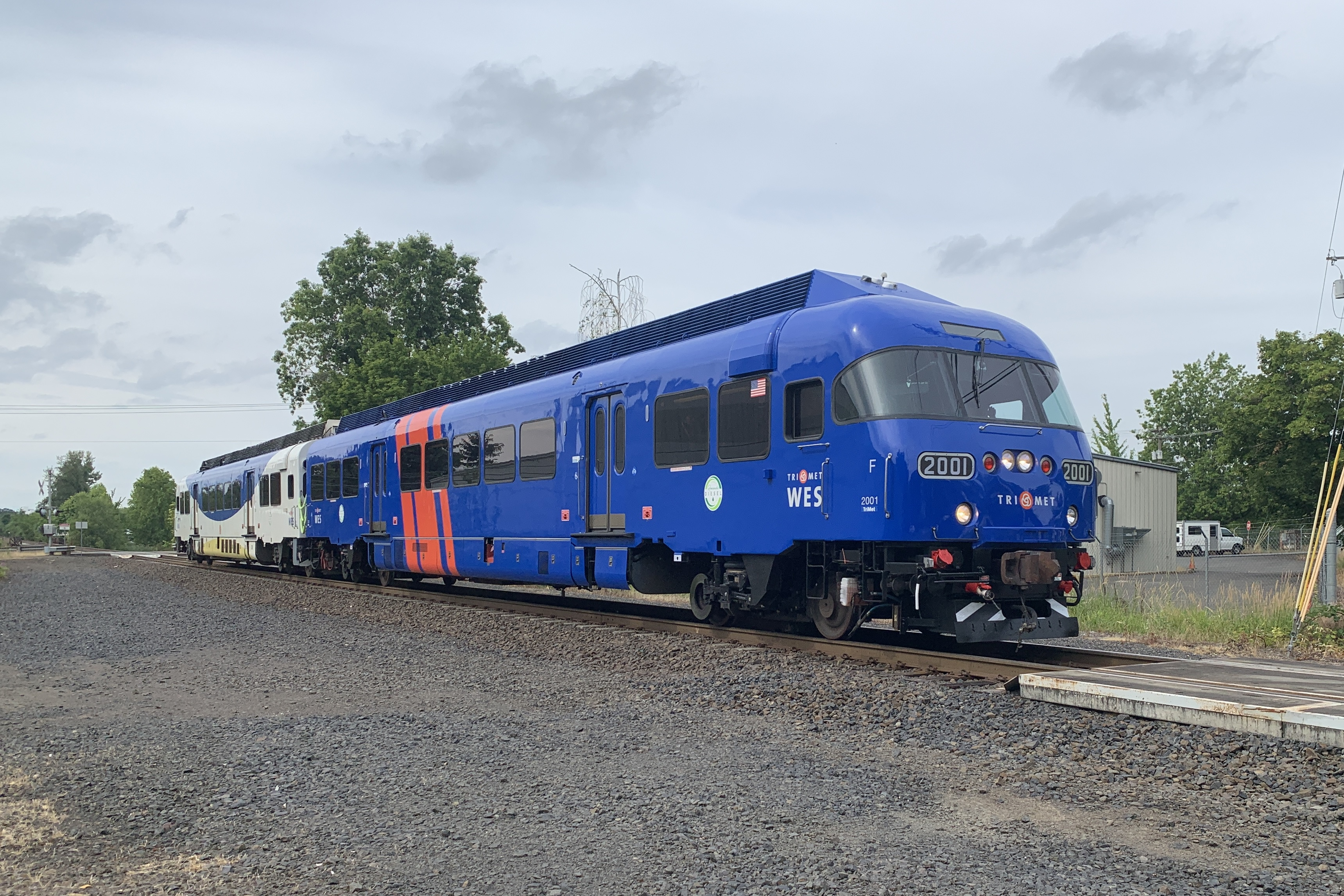
A DMU/cab car set with the cab car in TriMet's new paint scheme.

The commuter rail line between Beaverton and Wilsonville is operated primarily with trains made up from a fleet of four Colorado Railcar Aero diesel multiple unit (DMU) railcars. Of these, three are self-propelled and the fourth is an unpowered trailer car with operating cab. TriMet also owns four Budd RDC DMU railcars, of which two have entered service and are used as a backup.

WES rolling stock
Car number(s)	Image	Manufacturer	Model	Year built	First used on WES	Notes
1001–1003	A WES train parked next to the maintenance building. Each of WES's Colorado Railcar-built cars has one streamlined end (on the right in this view) and one non-streamlined end.	Colorado Railcar	Aero	2008	2009	Diesel multiple units (DMUs)
2001	A WES train parked next to the maintenance building. Each of WES's Colorado Railcar-built cars has one streamlined end (on the right in this view) and one non-streamlined end.	Colorado Railcar	Aero	2008	2009	Unpowered control car
1702	TriMet's RDC train 1702+1711 on Lombard Avenue in Beaverton in 2017	Budd	RDC-3	1953	2011	Ex-Alaska Railroad 702; originally New Haven 129
1711	TriMet's RDC train 1702+1711 on Lombard Avenue in Beaverton in 2017	Budd	RDC-2	1952	2011	Ex-Alaska Railroad 711; originally New Haven 121
2007		Budd	RDC-1	1957	TBD	Ex-Trinity Railway Express (Dallas) 2007; ex-Via Rail
2011		Budd	RDC-1	1957	TBD	Ex-Trinity Railway Express (Dallas) 2011; ex-Via Rail

== See also ==
- Portland Vintage Trolley
