= Siemens SD-100 and SD-160 =

Light rail vehicle

Siemens SD-100; Siemens SD-160
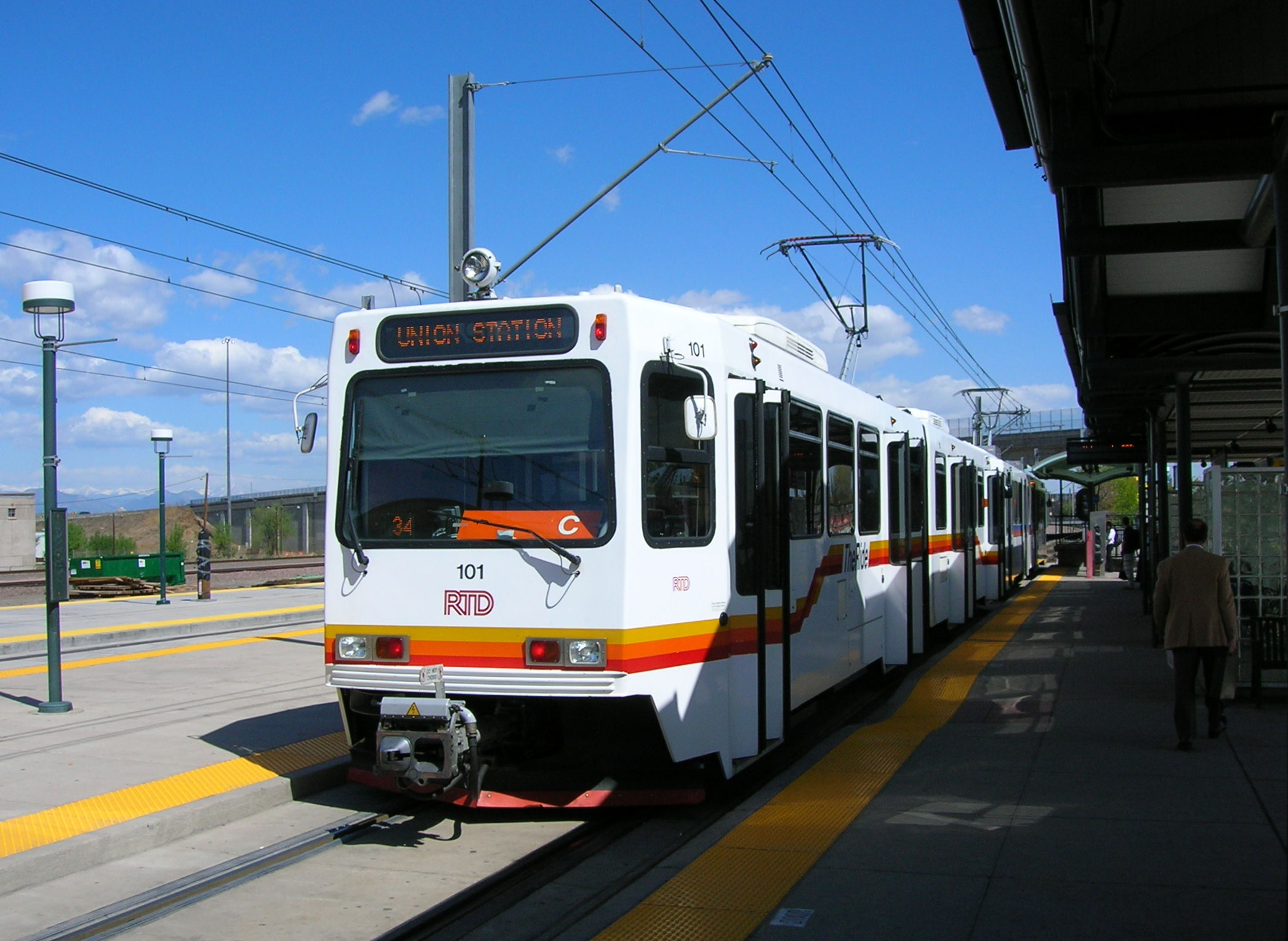
- RTD #101, the first SD-100 built, at I-25 & Broadway station in 2012

- Diagram of the Siemens SD100
- In service: 1994–present
- Manufacturer: Siemens Mobility
- Built at: Florin, California
- Constructed: 1992–2013
- Entered service: 1995–present
- Number built: 431
- Successor: Siemens S700 and S70; Siemens S200
- Capacity: 60 (seated); 190 (maximum)
- Operators: RTD Denver; San Diego Trolley; Calgary Transit; Edmonton Transit System; Metrotranvía de Mendoza; Salt Lake City UTA TRAX

Specifications
- Car length: 24.799 m (81 ft 4 3/8 in)
- Width: 2,652 mm (8 ft 8 3/8 in)
- Height: 3,780 mm (12 ft 4 7/8 in)
- Floor height: 991 mm (3 ft 3 in)
- Doors: 8 (4 per side)
- Articulated sections: 1
- Maximum speed: 80 km/h (50 mph)
- Weight: 40,370 kg (89,000 lb)
- Traction motors: 2 × 200 hp (150 kW); 4 × 194 hp (145 kW)
- Acceleration: 1.07 m/s^{2} (2.39 mph/s)
- Deceleration: 1.31 m/s^{2} (2.93 mph/s) (service); 2.63 m/s^{2} (5.88 mph/s) (emergency)
- HVAC: Roof-mounted air conditioning
- Electric system: 600-750 V DC overhead lines
- Current collection: Faiveley pantograph
- UIC classification: Bo’2Bo’
- AAR wheel arrangement: B-2-B
- Coupling system: Scharfenberg
- Multiple working: up to five cars
- Track gauge: 1,435 mm (4 ft 8 1/2 in) standard gauge

The Siemens SD-100 and SD-160 are two related types of high-floor light rail vehicles (LRV), manufactured by Siemens Mobility for the North American market. A total of 431 vehicles were built by Siemens in Florin, California from 1992 to 2013.

The SD-100 began production in 1992, and is equipped with direct current traction motors and folding doors. It was succeeded in 2001 by the revised SD-160, which is equipped with alternating current motors and plug doors. The first orders for the SD-160 were placed in 2001, and production continued until 2013.

A related design is the SD-400/SD-460 high-floor light rail vehicle, which was initially built by a Siemens–Duewag joint venture. Siemens purchased Duewag in 1999, and assembled the SD-460 model alongside the SD-100/SD-160 in Florin, California.

The SD-100, SD-160, SD-400, and SD-460 were succeeded in the 2010s by newer LRV designs from Siemens, including the low-floor S700 and S70 and the high-floor S200. As of 2024, most SD-100 and SD-160 vehicles remain in service with their original operators.

== History ==
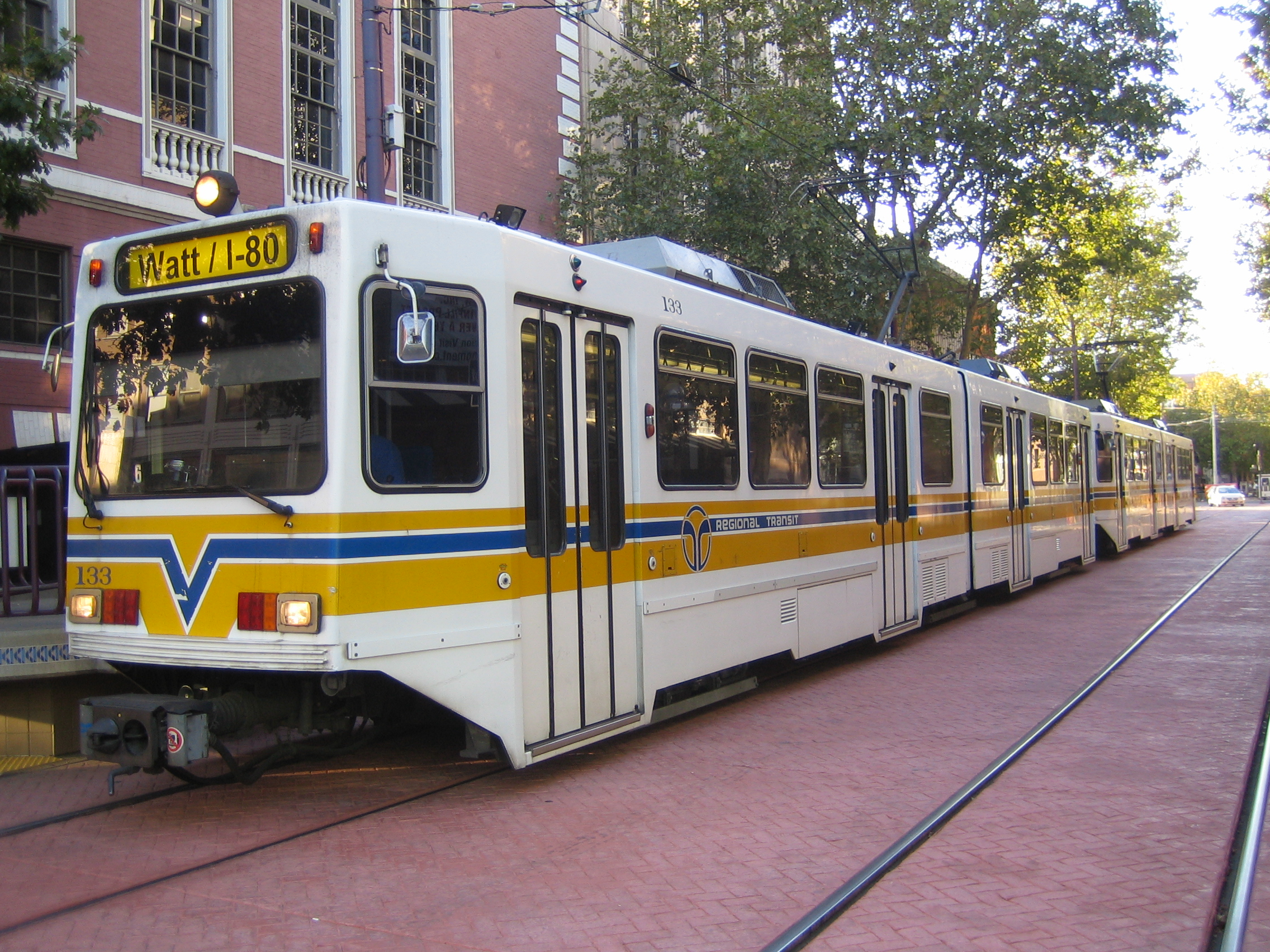
A U2A car in Sacramento, the design from which the SD-100 and SD-160 series cars were derived.

=== Orders ===
Production of the SD-100 was launched in 1992 when the Regional Transportation District, located in Denver, Colorado placed an order for 49 vehicles. The physical design was derived from the U2A car that was built between 1985 and 1991, but built with more modern mechanical equipment.

The first vehicles rolled off the production line at the Siemens facility in Florin, California in 1994, in time for the start of Light Rail service in Denver.

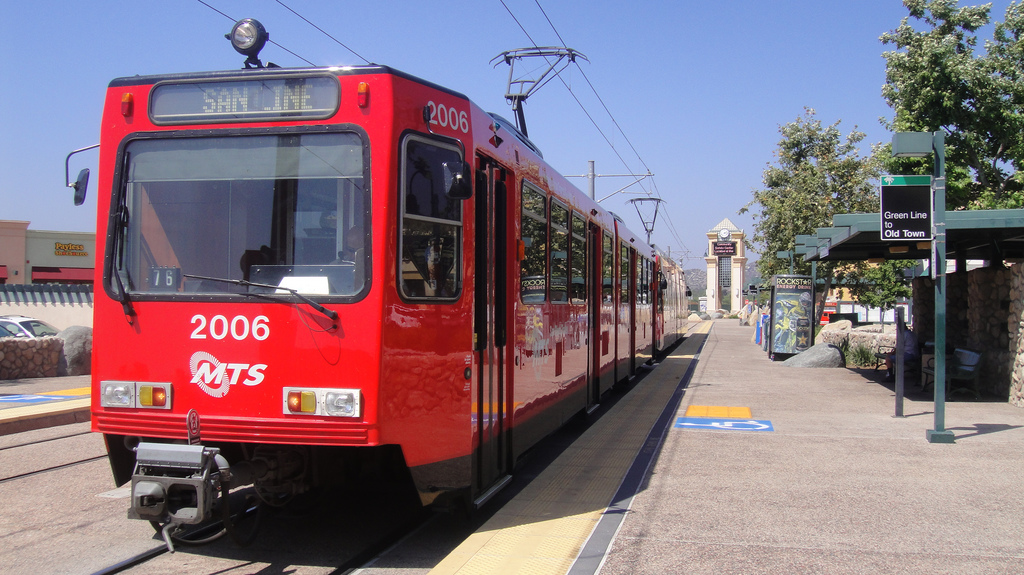
SDMTS #2006, an early SD-100 unit, at Santee in 2009

In 1993, the San Diego Metropolitan Transit System ordered 52 SD-100 cars as the San Diego Trolley system was expanded with a new line, these entered service in 1995. In early 2021, they were being phased out and in 2023 have been retired from service being replaced by the newer Siemens S700 models.

The final order for the SD-100 came in 1996, when the Utah Transit Authority, located in Salt Lake City placed an order for 23 vehicles that were delivered before the start of the TRAX light rail service in 1999.

In 2001, Siemens launched the SD-160 light rail vehicle, which used alternating current motors instead of direct current motors and outward sliding doors. Calgary Transit ordered 72 vehicles for its CTrain service, while the Utah Transit Authority ordered 17 vehicles as it expanded the TRAX light rail service. Deliveries to both agencies started in 2003.

The physical design of the SD-160 was updated in 2005 with a new end cap that changed the look of the front/rear of the train. The Edmonton Transit Service ordered 57 of the redesigned SD-160 vehicles and Calgary Transit ordered 38.

=== Service history ===
Starting in late 2017, Calgary has been sending SD-160s to Siemens' facility in Florin for mid-life refurbishment. The refurbished units contain several components and electronics already present on the S200, the successor to the SD-160. Along with some electronic improvements, they have been upgraded to be compatible with Calgary's newer SD-160s, which were previously incompatible due to software differences. The refurbished fleet will eventually start to run with the newer units once the software has been adjusted to allow seamless operation.

Since 2022, 39 retired San Diego SD-100s were transferred to Metrotranvía Mendoza to supplement its existing fleet of Siemens–Duewag U2 which had also been purchased from San Diego.

Currently, the Metropolitan Transportation System (MTS) of San Diego, California is in the process of donating its Siemens SD100 pairs to the Mendoza Transportation Society, which has an urban metro-tram service that connects four departments (Las Heras, Ciudad, Godoy Cruz and Maipú) of the Province of Mendoza, Argentine Republic. The donation consists of 39 pairs of the mentioned model, until June 2023 9 of the total pairs that are operating and providing regular service in Mendoza, Argentina have arrived, while for the remaining 30 MTS is expected to withdraw them from their service between this year and the next in order to coordinate the shipping logistics of these pairs between the two cities.

The arrival of these formations is important for Mendoza since it is carrying out works to double the route of its metro-tram service (it is estimated that they will end in 2026 or 2027), the arrival at the Mendoza International Airport and the department of Luján de Cuyo stands out. In addition, due to its speed compared to other means of transport, it is increasingly chosen and presents a greater demand for people, which is why it is also planned to join two pairs to increase passenger capacity.

== Technical details ==
The SD-160's dimensions are 24.802 metres (81 ft 4 1/2 in) by 2.654 metres (8 ft 8 1/2 in) by 3.811 metres (12 ft 6 in) and can be joined together to form trains of up to six cars in length. It is powered by four AC motors which provide a maximum of 580 kW. In most applications, the SD-160 has a maximum speed of 80 kilometres per hour (50 mph). Some SD-160 trains, such as those operated in Denver, are configured to reach higher speeds of 90 kilometres per hour (56 mph). It accelerates at 1.07 m/s^{2} (3.5 ft/s^{2}) and decelerates at 1.31 m/s^{2} (4.3 ft/s^{2}), with emergency braking deceleration of 2.63 m/s^{2} (8.6 ft/s^{2}). The brakes also serve as a generator, regenerating power back to a city's electrical lines. The SD-160 has a passenger capacity of 236 passengers (standing) with 64 seats.

Compared to its predecessor, the Siemens–Duewag U2, the SD-160's driver's cabin is significantly larger, but its total length is still less than 25 metres (82 ft 1/4 in), allowing three vehicles to be combined and still be under the 75-metre (246 ft 3/4 in) maximum length of a German streetcar train assembly. Each vehicle also features an onboard closed-circuit TV security camera system for increased passenger safety. Unlike the Siemens SD-100, the Siemens SD-160 does not use the bi-folded doors, instead using sliding doors similar to designs featured on the Siemens S70. In addition, both can be used together in mixed trains consisting of SD-100s and SD-160s. The new, streetcar-length S70 cars ordered for San Diego are designed to be compatible with the SD-100, allowing the SD-100 to operate in a mixed consist, sandwiched between two S70 cars.

The SD-160NG for Calgary have been taking over some features from the SD-460 series including IGBT equipment.

== Operators ==
Service	SD-100				SD-160			
Service	Image	Ordered	In service	Qty	Image	Ordered	In service	Qty
RTD (Denver)		1992	1994	49		2006	2008	152
San Diego Trolley (San Diego)		1993	1995	52	—			
UTA TRAX (Salt Lake City)		1996	1999	23		2001	2003	17
CTrain (Calgary)	—					2001	2003	72
CTrain (Calgary)	—					2007	2010	38
ETS (Edmonton)	—					2005	2008	57
MTS (Mendoza)		2022	2024	39				

== See also ==
Other Siemens light rail vehicles for the American market:

- Siemens–Duewag U2 – high-floor LRV for either level boarding at high-platform stations or steps for passenger loading at street level
- SD-400 and SD-460 – high-floor LRV for both level boarding at high-platform stations and with steps for passenger loading at street level
- SD660 – low-floor LRV for passenger loading at street level, custom built for Portland, Oregon
- P2000 – high-floor LRV for level boarding at high-platform stations, custom built for Los Angeles
- S700 and S70 – low-floor LRV for passenger loading at street level
- S200 – high-floor LRV for level boarding at high-platform stations
