= Siemens S700 and S70 =

Light rail transit vehicle

Siemens S70; Siemens S700; Siemens Avanto
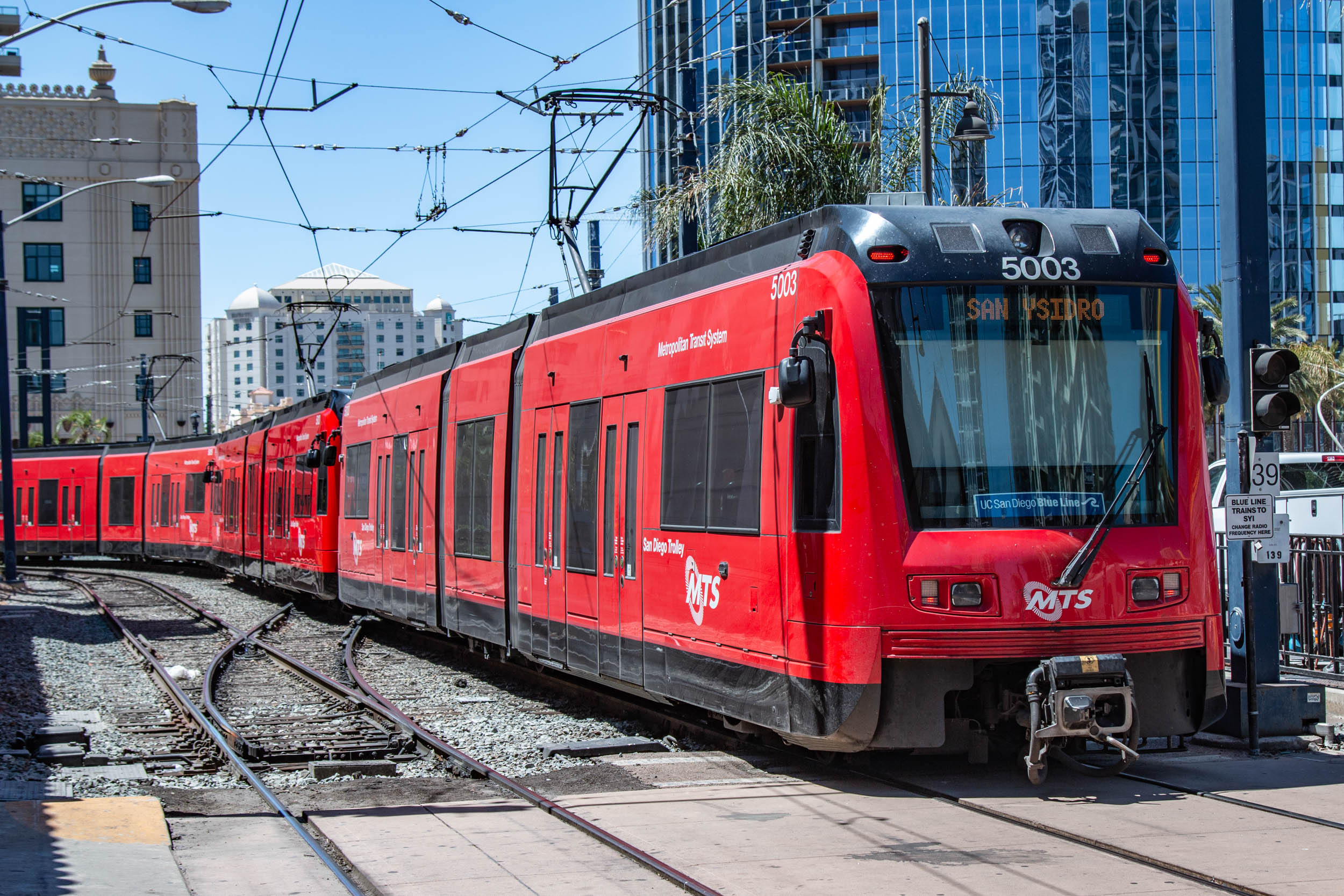
- San Diego Trolley #5003, a 2019-built S700 Ultra Short unit

- The inside of an S700 on the Link Light Rail
- Manufacturer: Siemens Mobility
- Constructed: since 2002
- Entered service: since 2004
- Predecessor: Siemens SD-100 and SD-160; Siemens SD660

Specifications
- Articulated sections: S70/S700: 3 (two articulations); Avanto: 5 (four articulations)
- Wheel diameter: 660 mm (26 in) (new); 580 mm (23 in) (worn)
- Wheelbase: 1.9 m (6 ft 3 in) (power truck); 1.8 m (5 ft 11 in) (center truck)
- Traction system: IGBT–VVVF inverter control
- Electric systems: Overhead line: 600 V DC (Note: Houston METRORail (dual voltage with 750 V), San Diego Trolley); 750 V DC (Note: Most systems); 1,500 V DC (Note: Seattle Link light rail); 25 kV 50 Hz AC (Note: Selected sections in Paris and Mulhouse, France)
- Current collection: Pantograph
- UIC classification: Bo′+2′+Bo′ (S70/S700); Bo′+2′+0′+2′+Bo′ (Avanto)
- AAR wheel arrangement: B-2-B (S70/S700)
- Wheels driven: 8
- Bogies: Siemens SF 70 (power truck); Siemens SF 40 (center truck)
- Minimum turning radius: 25 m (82 ft)
- Coupling system: Dellner/Scharfenberg
- Multiple working: Within type
- Track gauge: 4 ft 8 1/2 in (1,435 mm) standard gauge

The Siemens S70 and its successor, the Siemens S700, are a series of articulated low-floor light-rail vehicles (LRV) and modern streetcars manufactured for the United States market by Siemens Mobility, a division of German conglomerate Siemens. The series also includes a European tram-train variant, the Siemens Avanto.

The S70 was manufactured from 2002 to 2017 and the improved S700 since 2014. The S700 designation was introduced in 2019 and then retroactively applied to certain versions of the S70 built in earlier years. In this market, it competes mainly with Alstom and Kinki Sharyo low-floor LRVs and streetcars manufactured by Brookville and Inekon.

The Avanto was built for the European market starting in 2006 and was principally sold to tram-train systems which, in whole or part, share their tracks with heavy rail trains. In Europe, the Siemens Combino and Avenio models are the preferred offerings for purely light rail or tramway systems. In the tram-train market, its principal competitors are Alstom's Flexity and Citadis, as well as CAF's Urbos series.

== History ==
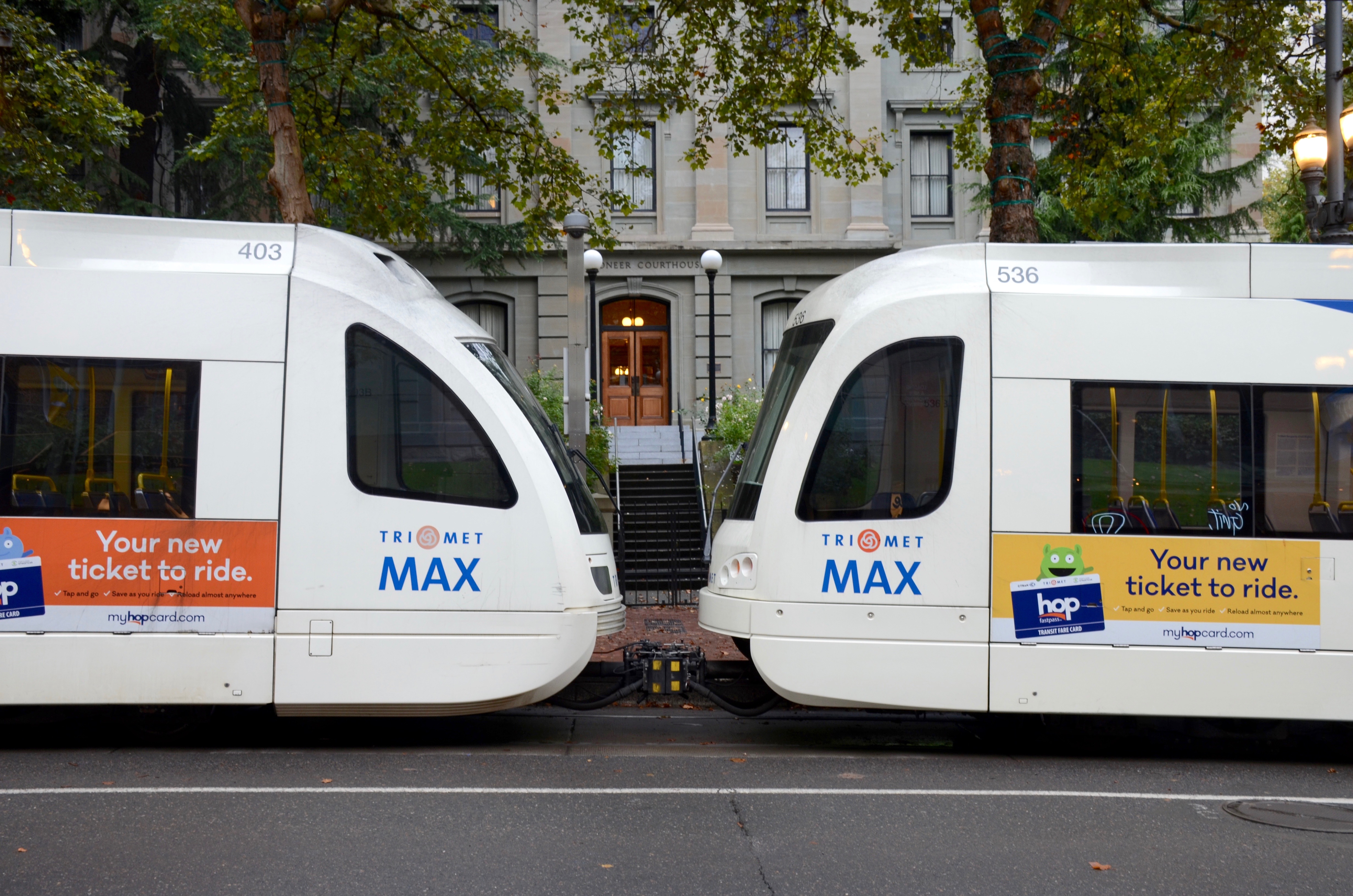
The design of the car ends of the S70 has been modified over time. The original end design, with a more pronounced slope, is shown at left and the later style at right.

The first order for S70 vehicles in the U.S. – where the three-section model was originally known as S70 Avanto but soon became known simply as the S70 – was placed in 2001 for the METRORail system in Houston, Texas, and the first car was received by Houston in April 2003. This first series of S70 cars entered service on January 1, 2004, the opening day of Houston's light rail system. At Siemens's U.S. manufacturing facilities (in Sacramento, California), only the model S700 remains in production, the last S70s having been built in 2017, for Minneapolis–Saint Paul's Metro Transit light rail system.

The first purchase of the European version, a five-section tram-train design sold under the Avanto brand name, was a 15-car order placed in July 2002 by SNCF, for its line between Aulnay-sous-Bois and Bondy, which is now known as Île-de-France tramway Line 4.

=== S700 redesign and model number change ===
The model number S700 was adopted by Siemens Mobility in 2019 as a rebranding of a version of the S70 that had been in production since 2014. Versions later branded as the S700 used an adapted form of Siemens' model SF 40 center truck, first used in its SD660 model (first built in 1996 for Portland, Oregon's MAX Light Rail system) to the S70. This truck allowed longitudinal (sideways-facing) seating to be used in the center section, in place of the transverse seating used in the S70. The design change provided better passenger comfort and movement. The first LRVs built to the newer design were the "Type 5" cars for the MAX Light Rail system, in 2014. Initially Siemens continued to sell LRVs with either center-section configuration and used the designation S70 for both. In 2019, the company began using the designation S700 for new orders, and in 2020 it retroactively applied the S700 designation to all LRVs and streetcars that had been built to the newer design since its creation in 2013 or 2014.

== Size and configuration ==
The S70, S700, and Avanto have a modular design and can be built in a number of different sizes and configurations, including both light-rail vehicle (LRV) and streetcar versions.

The standard version of the S70 and S700 LRV is 95.4 feet (29.1 m) long, although the earliest S70 units delivered had a different, longer cab design that extended the length to 96 feet (29.3 m). The streetcar version of the S700 is 85.25 feet (25.98 m) long, about 10 feet (3.0 m) shorter than the standard LRV. Siemens also offers a US ("Ultra Short") variant of the LRV at 81.4 feet (24.8 m), about 14 feet (4.3 m) shorter than the standard version. The San Diego Trolley and the Salt Lake City TRAX systems have purchased the US variants. The Avantos built for France have a length of 120 feet 4 inches (36.68 m). A seven-unit variant, which would extend to 190 feet (58 m), was proposed in 2026 to serve customers that use longer consists of three or four cars. All versions of the S70 and S700 have the suspended articulation construction.

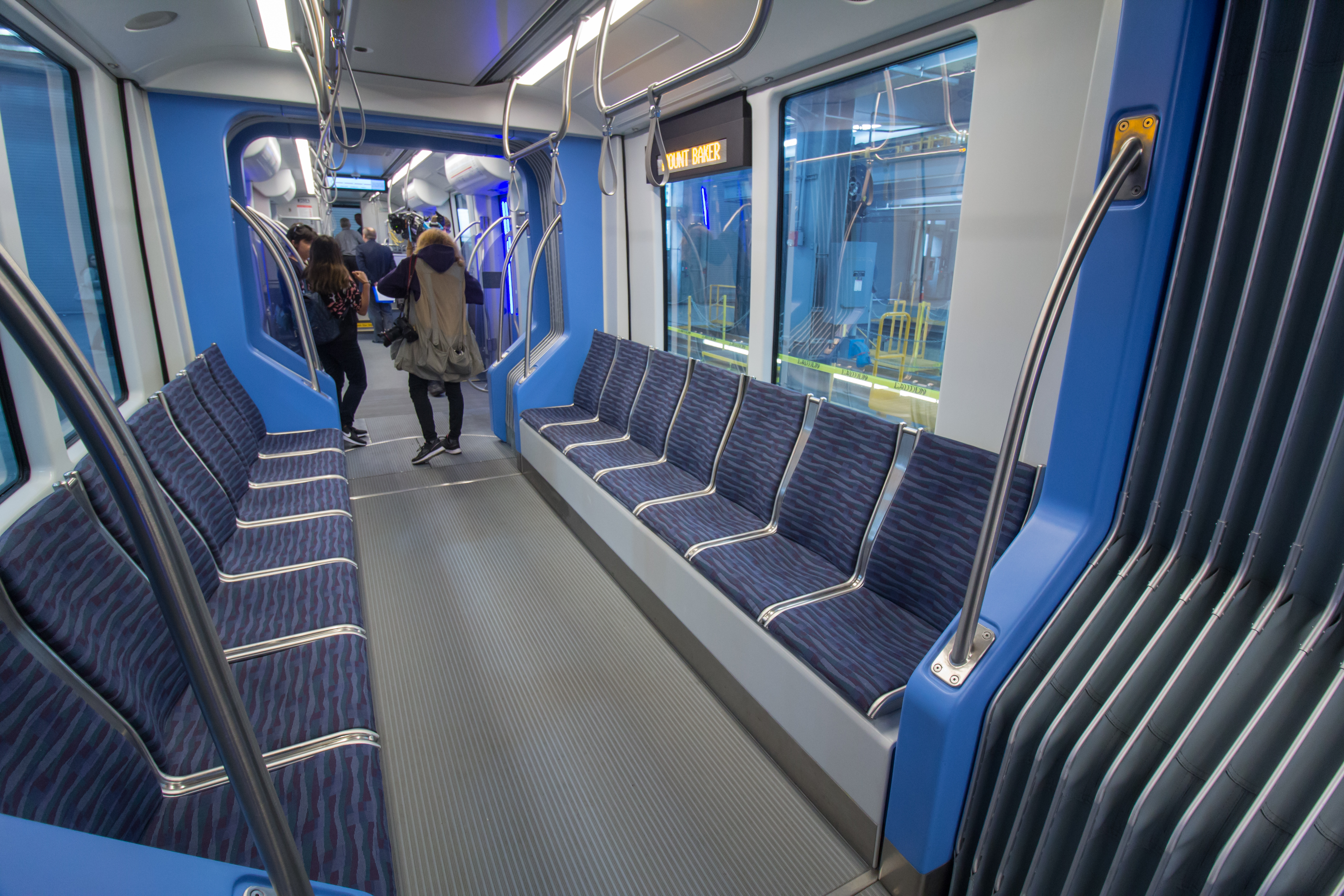
Unlike the S70, the S700 has longitudinal seating in the center section, with a wider aisle.

The major change between the S70 and the S700 is the seating in the center section of the vehicle. The S700 has longitudinal seating in this section with passengers facing the aisle, while the S70 had more traditional seating with passengers sitting four-across, facing forward or back, with an aisle in between. This 2013 change, which was made to eliminate a seating layout that had been criticized as cramped and ease the movement of passengers within that section, was the primary design change that led Siemens eventually to adopt (in 2019) the new model number for the modified S70 design. The S700 also has some technology upgrades.

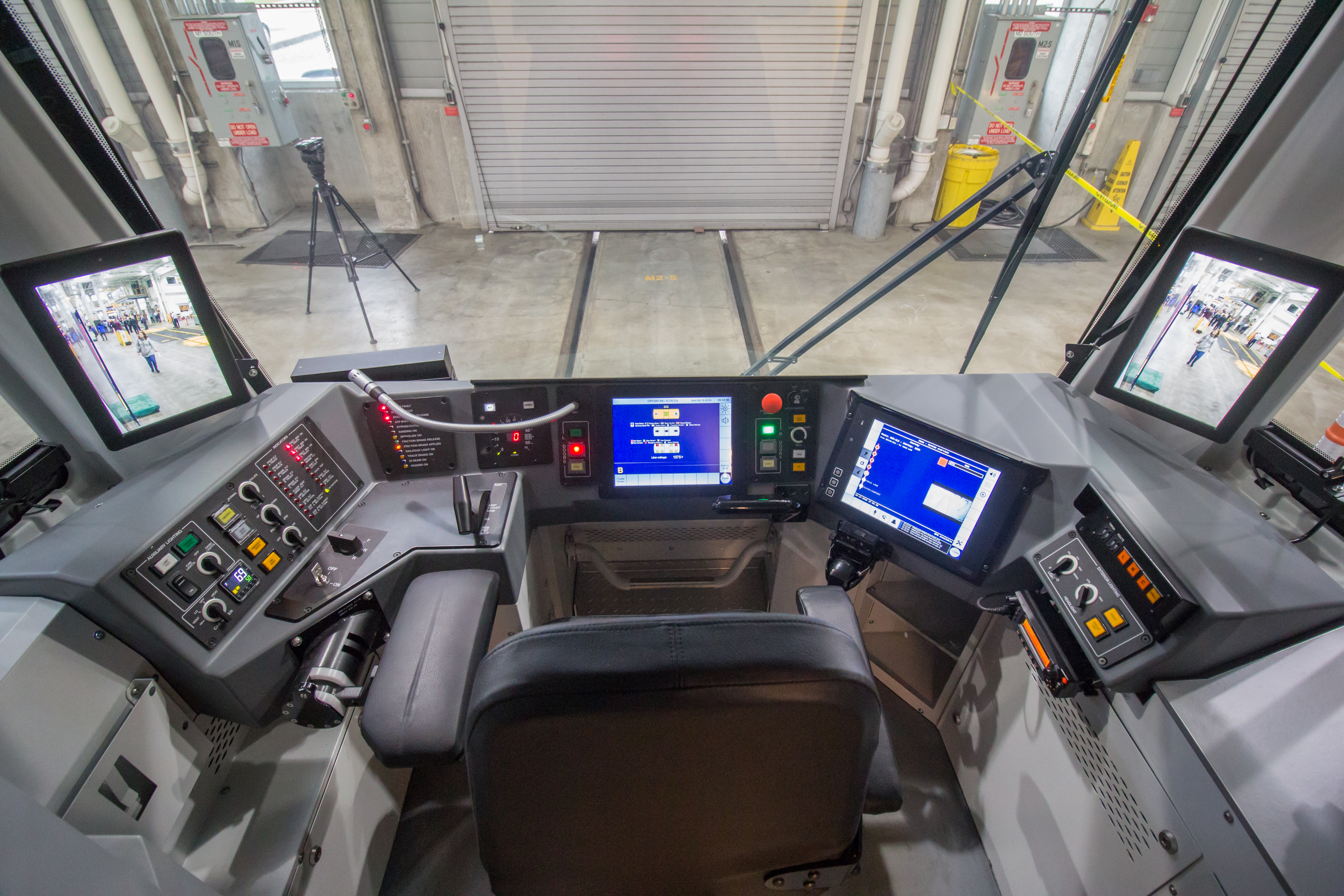
Operator's cab of a Sound Transit S700 built in 2019

Most vehicles are double-ended, with operating controls at both ends and doors on both sides. An exception are 40 cars in service on TriMet's MAX system, which are single-ended and have cabs at only one end of each car. However, in service they always operate in pairs, coupled back-to-back, so that each consist has operating cabs at both ends. TriMet reverted to a double-ended design for its latest order of S700s (placed in 2019).

The S70, S700 and Avanto can be configured to operate on various overhead power supply systems. For example, the Avantos ordered for France are dual voltage, capable of operating on 750 V DC when running on tram or light rail tracks and on 25 kV 50 Hz AC when running on main line tracks. Systems in the Americas most commonly use the 750 V DC system, but S700s are used on 600 V DC in San Diego and on 1500 V DC in Seattle. On the CityLynx Gold Line in Charlotte, the vehicles are additionally equipped with onboard batteries.

The S70 and S700 can also be equipped to interface with older Siemens light rail vehicles. The San Diego Trolley's S70 and S700 vehicles frequently operate with high-floor SD-100 vehicles.

== Usage and current orders ==
=== United States ===
Operator	Service	Image	Began service	Qty	Type
MARTA (Atlanta)	Atlanta Streetcar		2014	4	S70 Ultra Short
CATS (Charlotte)	Lynx Blue Line		2007-2017	42	S70
CATS (Charlotte)	CityLynx Gold Line		2019-2020	6	S700 Ultra Short
METRO (Houston)	METRORail		2004-2022	51	S70, S70 Ultra Short, S700
Metro Transit (Minneapolis-Saint Paul)	Metro		2013-2020	91	S70, S700
Hampton Roads Transit (Norfolk)	The Tide		2011	9	S70
Valley Metro (Phoenix)	Valley Metro Rail		2022	25	S700
TriMet (Portland)	MAX Light Rail		2009-2025	70	S70, S700
SacRT (Sacramento)	SacRT light rail		2024	63	S700 Ultra Short
UTA (Salt Lake City)	TRAX		2010-2012	77	S70 Ultra Short
UTA (Salt Lake City)	S Line		2010-2012	77	S70 Ultra Short
MTS (San Diego)	San Diego Trolley		2005-2024	168	S70, S70 Ultra Short, S700 Ultra Short
OCTA (Santa Ana)	OC Streetcar		2027	8	S700
Sound Transit (Seattle)	Link light rail		2021	152	S700

- Atlanta, Georgia (Atlanta Streetcar): 4 S70 Streetcar units, ordered in 2011. In May 2011, Siemens announced that it had won the $17.2 million contract to build the four streetcars that run on the Atlanta Streetcar. The vehicles were built at Siemens' plant in Florin, California, but with major components, including the propulsion system, assembled at Siemens' plant in Alpharetta, Georgia. The first of the streetcars was delivered on February 17, 2014, and began passenger service on December 30, 2014.
- Charlotte, North Carolina
  - Lynx Blue Line: 42 S70 units purchased and now operating. First 16 cars, purchased for $50 million, have been in service since the opening of the Charlotte light rail system in November 2007. Four additional units purchased in 2008 to keep up with higher-than-expected ridership were received in early 2010. In 2012, after 4 years of operation, the original 16 cars had to be repaired at the Siemens facility in California for an estimated cost of $400,000 each. A third order, for 22 LRVs, was delivered in stages between fall 2014 and spring 2017, and CATS now operates 42 S70 vehicles.
  - CityLynx Gold Line: Six S700 (Note: The cars in this order were considered to be model S70 at the time the order was placed, but in 2020 were retroactively rebranded as model S700 by Siemens.) streetcar units were ordered in 2016, and were delivered in 2019–2020. These six cars were specified to have internal batteries to allow off-wire operations in some areas. The S700 streetcars are a compact version of the S70 light rail vehicles that currently operate on the LYNX Blue Line. The cost to purchase these six vehicles and spare parts is $40.4 million.
- Houston, Texas (METRORail): 18 S70 units purchased, the first of which was delivered in April 2003; delivery was completed in late 2004. Nineteen additional units were purchased in 2011, procured using Utah Transit Authority (Salt Lake City) options, delivered starting in late 2012. The original cars are the long variant; the 2012–13 cars are the US ("Ultra Short") variant. 14 more S700 units were ordered in early 2019.
- Minneapolis–Saint Paul, Minnesota (Metro): 64 S70 units purchased. Delivery of initial order of 59 began in 2012, with the first unit entering service in February 2013. In October 2015, an option was exercised for five additional vehicles at a cost of $20 million, and these were received in fall 2017. In October 2016, an order was placed for 27 more S70s, to a modified design that has since been rebranded S700 by Siemens. Delivery began in May 2020.
- Norfolk, Virginia (The Tide): 9 S70 cars, ordered in 2007. First cars delivered October 2009. Entered service with the opening of the Norfolk system, in 2011.
- Phoenix, Arizona (Valley Metro Rail): 11 S700 vehicles ordered, in June 2017, with options for up to 67 more. Fourteen options exercised in October 2020. Began to enter service January 2022.
- Portland, Oregon (MAX Light Rail): 22 S70 and 18 S700 units purchased and now in operation. Order for initial 21 S70 cars announced on May 11, 2006; later expanded by one car. Entered service starting August 6, 2009. Order placed 2012 for another 18 cars; delivered in 2014–2015 and subsequently rebranded as S700 by Siemens. An order for 26 S700 units was placed in July 2019 and increased to 30 in 2021. First two cars entered service in January 2025. Unlike Portland's previous S70 and S700 LRVs, these are double-ended.
- Sacramento, California (SacRT light rail): 20 S700 units ordered in 2020 for the SacRT light rail system, with options for a total of 76 cars. Shortly after the initial 20-unit order, Sacramento was awarded by the California State Transportation Agency another $23.6 million dollars to purchase an additional 8 units, thus bringing the total number of S700 units on order for delivery beginning in 2022 to 28. Seventeen additional cars were purchased in 2023 and early 2024, bringing the total number of S700 units to 45. Began to enter service September 2024. On October 24, 2024, SacRT announced they received another round of funding allowing them to acquire another 10 S700 units bringing the total to 55 units out of the contract option of up to 76. On December 11, 2025, SacRT announced they acquired another round of funding which helped in the acquisition of additional S700 LRVs and thus bringing the total ordered as 63 S700s out of the original option of 76.
- Salt Lake City, Utah
  - TRAX: 77 S70 US ("Ultra Short") units ordered; in service since August 7, 2011.
  - S Line: S70 US units
- San Diego, California (San Diego Trolley): 11 S70 (92-foot; 28.04 m) units purchased in first order in October 2004, with delivery complete in July 2005. A second order, for 57 S70 US ("Ultra Short" 81-foot; 24.69 m) cars, was placed in October 2009; the order was later increased to a total of 65 S70 US units in 2012. 45 additional cars, now of the rebranded model S700 US, entered service in April 2019 and the last cars in the order were received in October 2020. Meanwhile, an additional 25 S700s were ordered in mid-2019.
- Santa Ana, California (OC Streetcar): 8 S700 streetcar units ordered in March 2018 for the under construction OC Streetcar light rail line. First unit delivered in May 2025, planned to enter service in 2026.
- Seattle, Washington (Link light rail): 152 S700 units on order. Of these, an order for 122 was placed in September 2016 and delivery began in 2019. This $554 million contract was the largest contract in Sound Transit's history. The order was expanded by 30 cars in spring 2017. The LRVs will be used for expansion of the Central Link system. Entered service in May 2021.

=== France ===
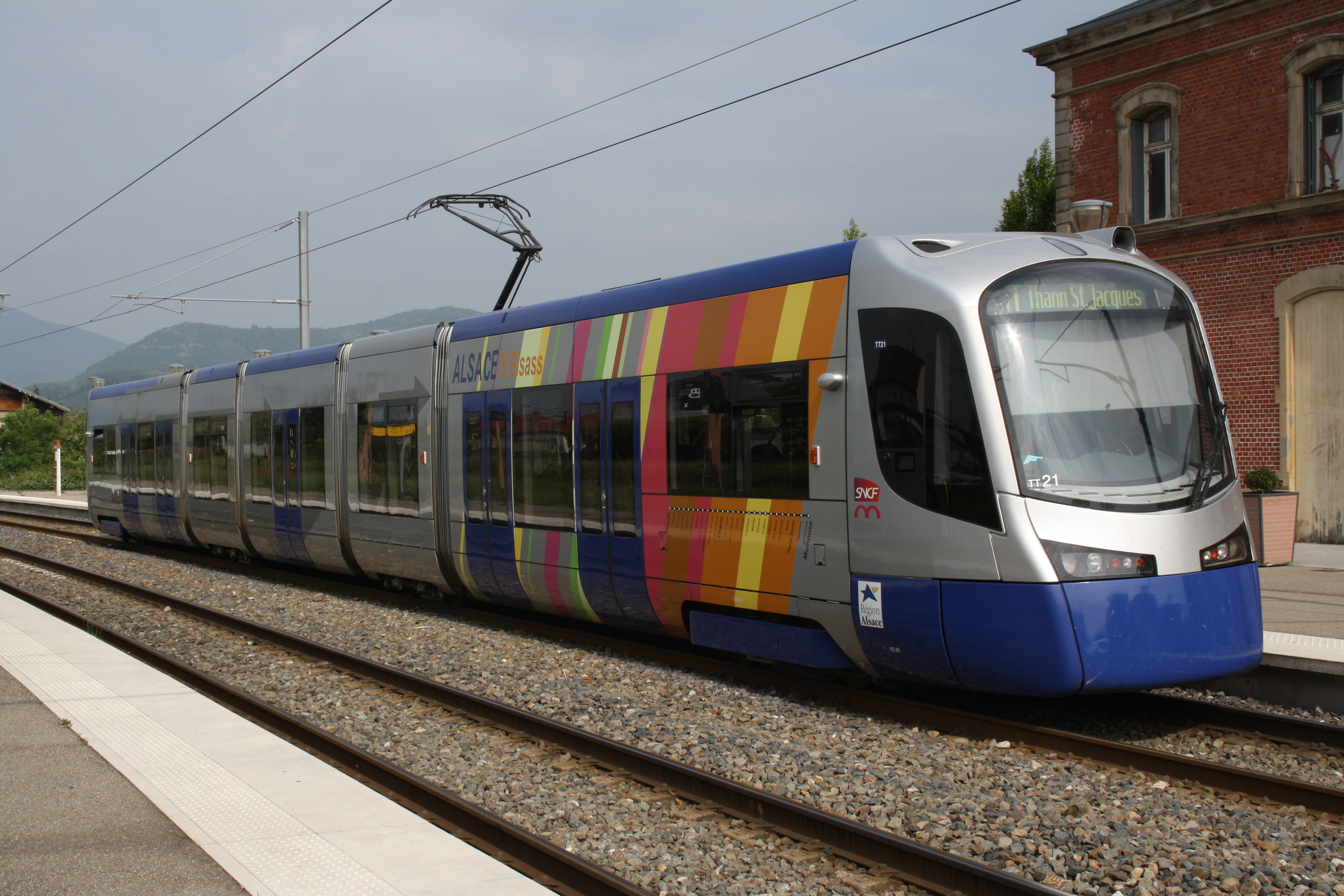
An Avanto model on the Mulhouse tram-train.

The S70 model used in France is known as the Avanto and locally designated as the U 25500. Unlike the S70 models in the U.S., the Avanto has 5 sections instead of 3.

- Paris (Île-de-France tramway Line 4): 15 tram-train units purchased. Entered service starting on November 18, 2006. Units started to be replaced on the line by newer Alstom Citadis Dualis trainsets starting in 2023, with all trains being removed from service by April 2024.
- Mulhouse (Mulhouse tramway): 12 tram-train units delivered, for use on an SNCF line from Mulhouse to Thann, Haut-Rhin. First unit delivered on November 6, 2009. Entered service on December 11, 2010.

=== Cancelled orders ===
- An order for 22 S70 cars, placed in 2006 by Ottawa, Ontario for a planned expansion of its O-Train system, was later cancelled. Political problems had resulted in cancellation of the entire expansion project, which in turn led to lawsuits by Siemens and other contractors against the City of Ottawa.

== See also ==
- Light rail in North America
- Streetcars in North America

Other Siemens light rail vehicles for the American market:

- Siemens–Duewag U2 – high-floor LRV for either level boarding at high-platform stations or steps for passenger loading at street level
- SD-100 and SD-160 – high-floor LRV for either level boarding at high-platform stations or steps for passenger loading at street level
- SD-400 and SD-460 – high-floor LRV for both level boarding at high-platform stations and with steps for passenger loading at street level
- SD660 – low-floor LRV for passenger loading at street level, custom built for Portland, Oregon
- P2000 – high-floor LRV for level boarding at high-platform stations, custom built for Los Angeles
- S200 – high-floor LRV for level boarding at high-platform stations (with movable steps for passenger loading at street level in San Francisco)
