= Siemens SD-400 and SD-460 =

Light rail vehicle

Siemens SD-400; Siemens SD-460
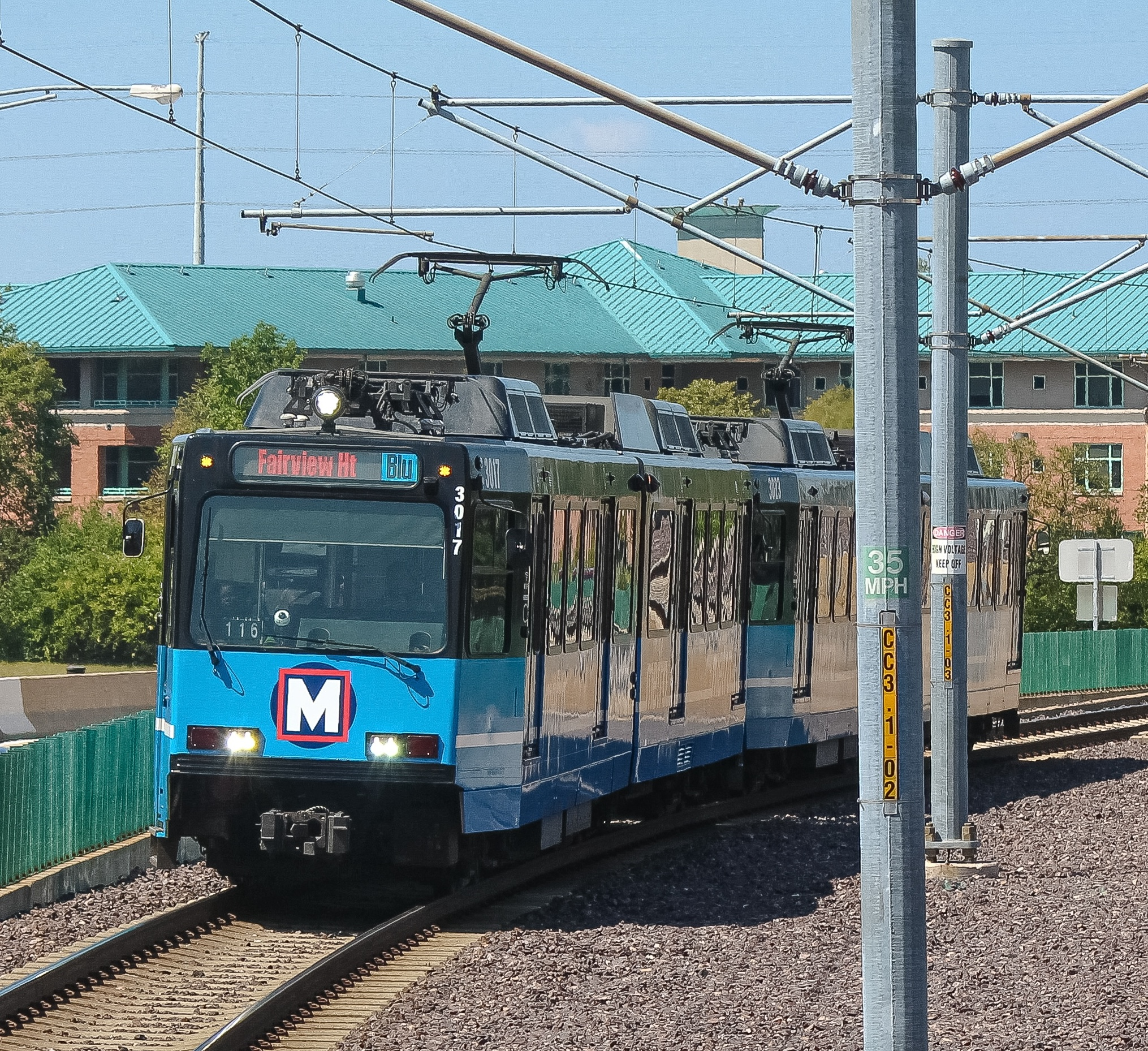
- Two Siemens SD-460 LRVs on St. Louis MetroLink

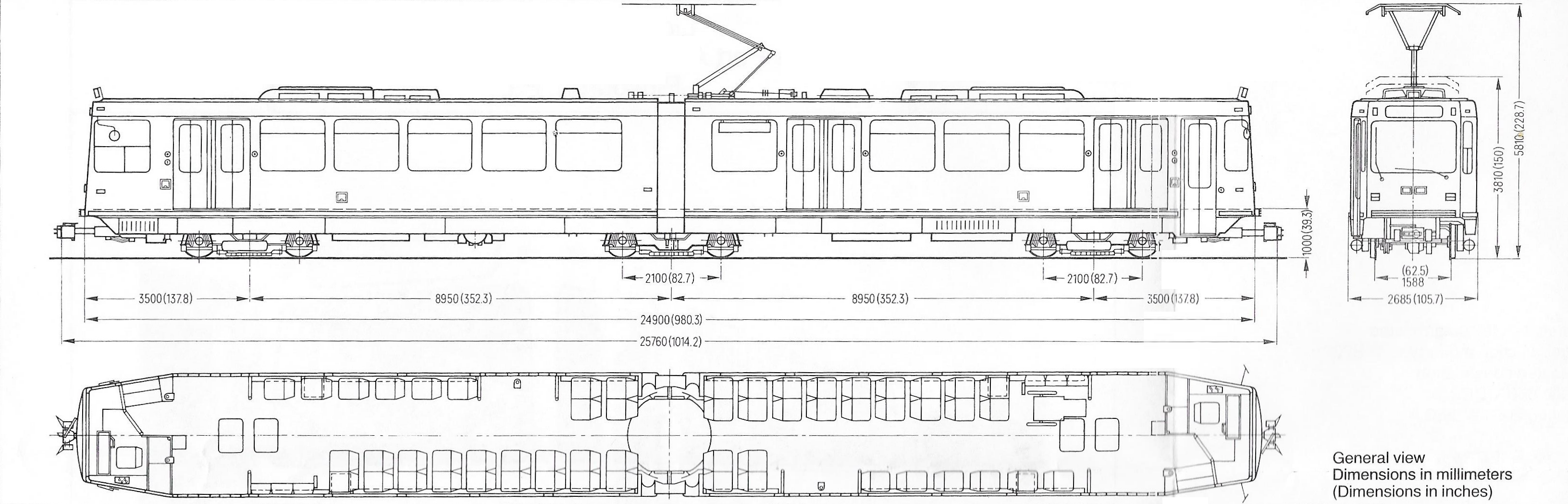
- Interior diagram of the Siemens SD-400
- Manufacturer: Siemens Mobility
- Built at: SD-400: Düsseldorf; SD-460: Florin, California
- Constructed: SD-400: 1985–1993; SD-460: 1999–2005
- Number built: SD-400: 86; SD-460: 68
- Operators: Metro Transit (St. Louis); Pittsburgh Regional Transit; Valencia Metro

Specifications
- Car length: 89.4 ft (27.25 m)
- Width: 8.7 ft (2.65 m)
- Height: 12.5 ft (3.81 m)
- Maximum speed: 65 mph (105 km/h)
- Weight: SD-400: 89,560 lb (40,620 kg); SD-460: 92,500 lb (42,000 kg)
- Traction system: SD-400: Siemens chopper control SD-460: Siemens IGBT-VVVF
- Traction motors: 4 × 200 hp (149 kW); SD-400: DC motor SD-460: 3-phase AC induction motor
- Power output: 800 hp (597 kW)
- Acceleration: 3 mph/s (4.8 km/(h⋅s))
- Deceleration: 3 mph/s (4.8 km/(h⋅s)) (service)
- Electric system: Overhead line 650–750 V DC
- Current collection: Faiveley & Brecknell Willis pantographs
- UIC classification: Bo'2'Bo'
- AAR wheel arrangement: B-2-B
- Coupling system: Tomlinson
- Track gauge: 4 ft 8 1/2 in (1,435 mm) standard gauge; 5 ft 2 1/2 in (1,588 mm) Pennsylvania trolley gauge (Pittsburgh)

The Siemens SD-400 and SD-460 are light rail vehicles (LRV) that were manufactured by Siemens Mobility between 1985 and 2005 for the North and South American markets. The SD-400 was built under Siemens' joint venture with Duewag and assembled at both Duewag's factory in Düsseldorf, West Germany (Germany after reunification in 1990) and the Siemens factory in Florin, California. Siemens purchased Duewag in 1999 and the SD-460 was assembled entirely at the Siemens factory in California.

The primary difference between the models is that the older SD-400 uses direct current motors, while the newer SD-460 uses alternating current motors. Both models were built with a "high-floor" design and equipped with 3-4 doors on each side for level boarding at high-platform stations and one door with steps for boarding at street-level.

The SD-400 and SD-460 were manufactured and marketed alongside the older Siemens–Duewag U2 LRV and later the Siemens SD-100 and SD-160 vehicles. The U2, SD-100, and SD-160 all offered either level boarding at high-platform stations or steps for passenger loading at street level.

This model has been replaced by the Siemens S700 and S70, low-floor vehicles for passenger loading at street level and the Siemens S200, a high-floor LRV for level boarding at high-platform stations.

== Technical details ==
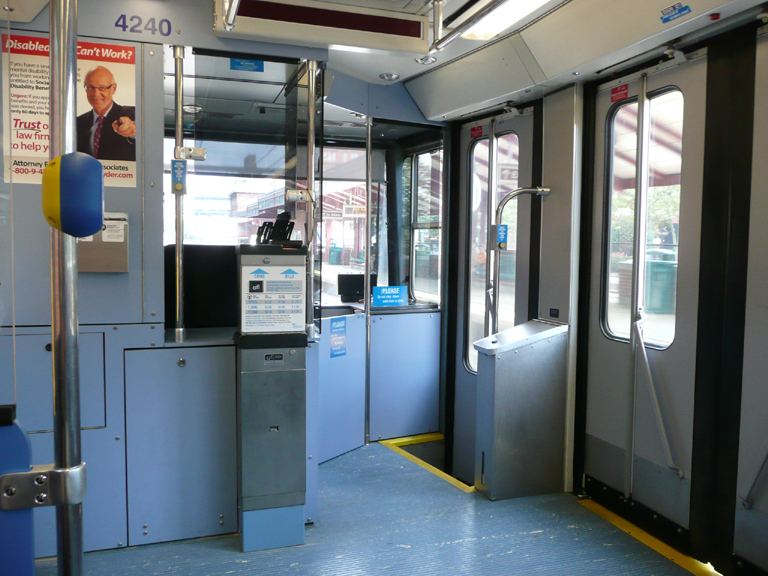
The interior of a Siemens SD-400 operated by Pittsburgh Regional Transit on the Pittsburgh Light Rail system. The door in the foreground is for level boarding at high-platform stations, and the door in the background has steps for boarding at street level.

Both models have a common design, with frames built upon a B-2-B truck configuration mounted underneath a double-ended articulated body, which has a seating capacity for 72 people and room for an additional 106 standing passengers. There are four high-level, inward-opening double bifold doors on each side of the vehicle for level boarding, along with an additional low-level, single right-side doorway and steps at each end of the vehicle for low-level boarding. The dual-height door design was necessary on the Pittsburgh Light Rail system, which has both high-platform stations and traditional street-level streetcar stops. The Pittsburgh cars also have only three sets of doors per side as opposed to four on the others, omitting the left-side doors immediately ahead of the articulation joint in the direction of travel. The other operators of the SD-400 and SD-460 do not use the street-level doors in regular service.

Both the SD-400 and SD-460 are powered by four individual Siemens electric traction motors with each one developing 200 horsepower (149 kW) and creating a combined total power output of 800 horsepower (597 kW). The older SD-400 uses direct current (DC) motors, while the newer SD-460 uses alternating current (AC) motors. The SD-460 also uses updated electronic equipment with insulated-gate bipolar transistors (IGBT) compared to the SD-400. On both types, electric current is received via an overhead catenary wire, which supplies 750 volts into the motors.

More than 80 SD-400 units were produced between 1985 and 1993, with all being manufactured at Siemens' primary manufacturing plant at its home base in Germany, while nearly 70 SD-460 units have been produced since 1999, with all being manufactured at Siemens' secondary manufacturing plant at their American base in California as opposed to Germany. The SD-400 is used by Pittsburgh Regional Transit for the Pittsburgh Light Rail in Pennsylvania, while the SD-460 is used for the Valencia Metro in Venezuela. Both types are also used on the MetroLink system operated by Metro Transit in St. Louis. In 2023, Metro's board approved a $390.4 million contract with Siemens for as many 55 S200 battery-hybrid light rail vehicles to replace the oldest SD-400/460 cars.

== Operators ==
Service	SD-400			SD-460		
Service	Image	Built	Qty	Image	Built	Qty
Pittsburgh Regional Transit (Pittsburgh Light Rail)		1985–87	55	—		
Metro Transit (St. Louis) (MetroLink)		1991–93	31		1999–2005	56
Valencia Metro	—				1999	12

== See also ==
Other Siemens light rail vehicles for the American market:

- Siemens–Duewag U2 – high-floor LRV for either level boarding at high-platform stations or steps for passenger loading at street level
- SD-100 and SD-160 – high-floor LRV for either level boarding at high-platform stations or steps for passenger loading at street level
- SD660 – low-floor LRV for passenger loading at street level, custom built for Portland, Oregon
- P2000 – high-floor LRV for level boarding at high-platform stations, custom built for Los Angeles
- S700 and S70 – low-floor LRV for passenger loading at street level
- S200 – high-floor LRV for level boarding at high-platform stations
