= Siemens SD660 =

Light rail vehicle

Siemens SD660 (Types 2 and 3)
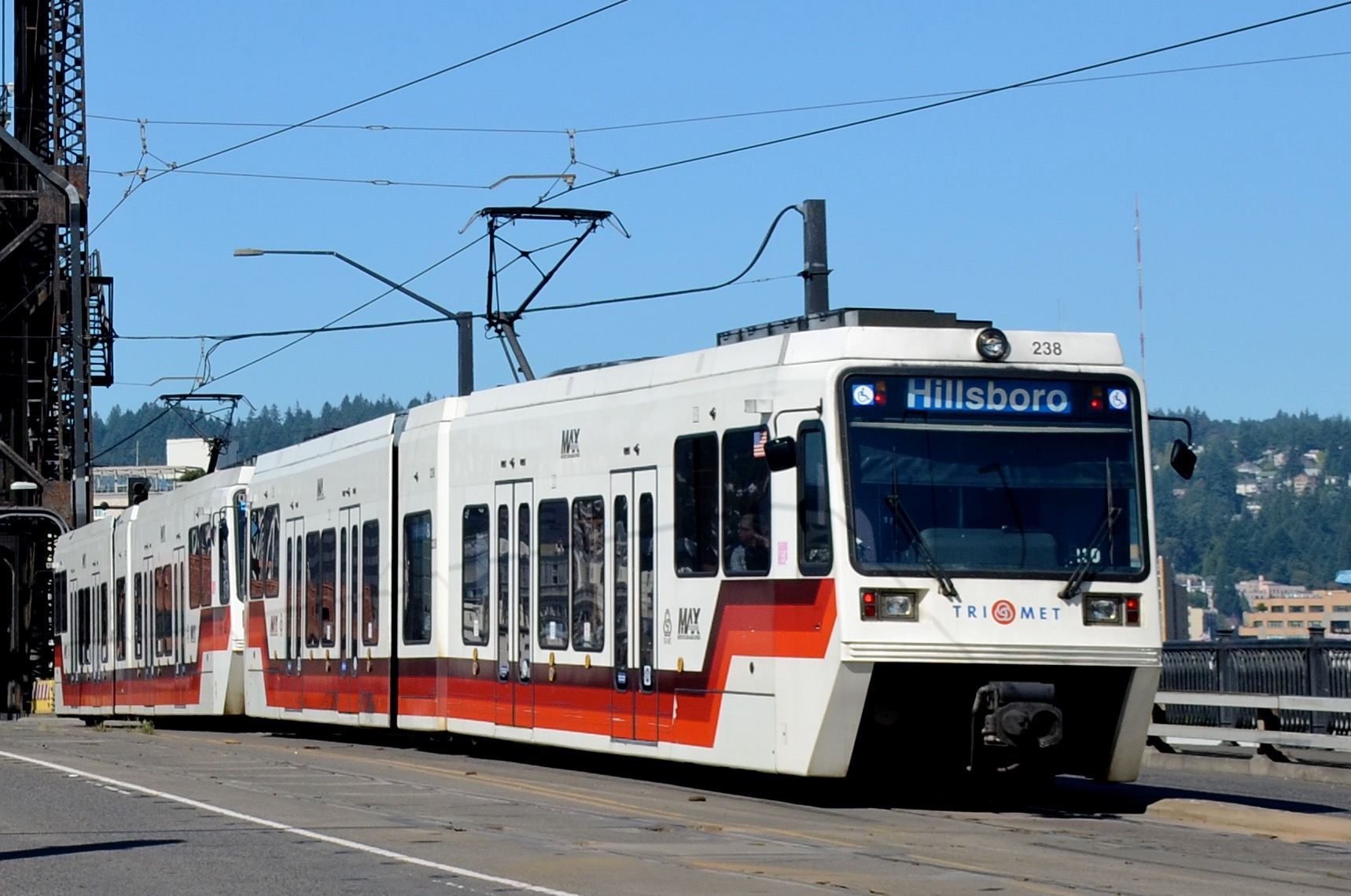
- A Blue Line train of SD660s on the Steel Bridge in Portland, Oregon

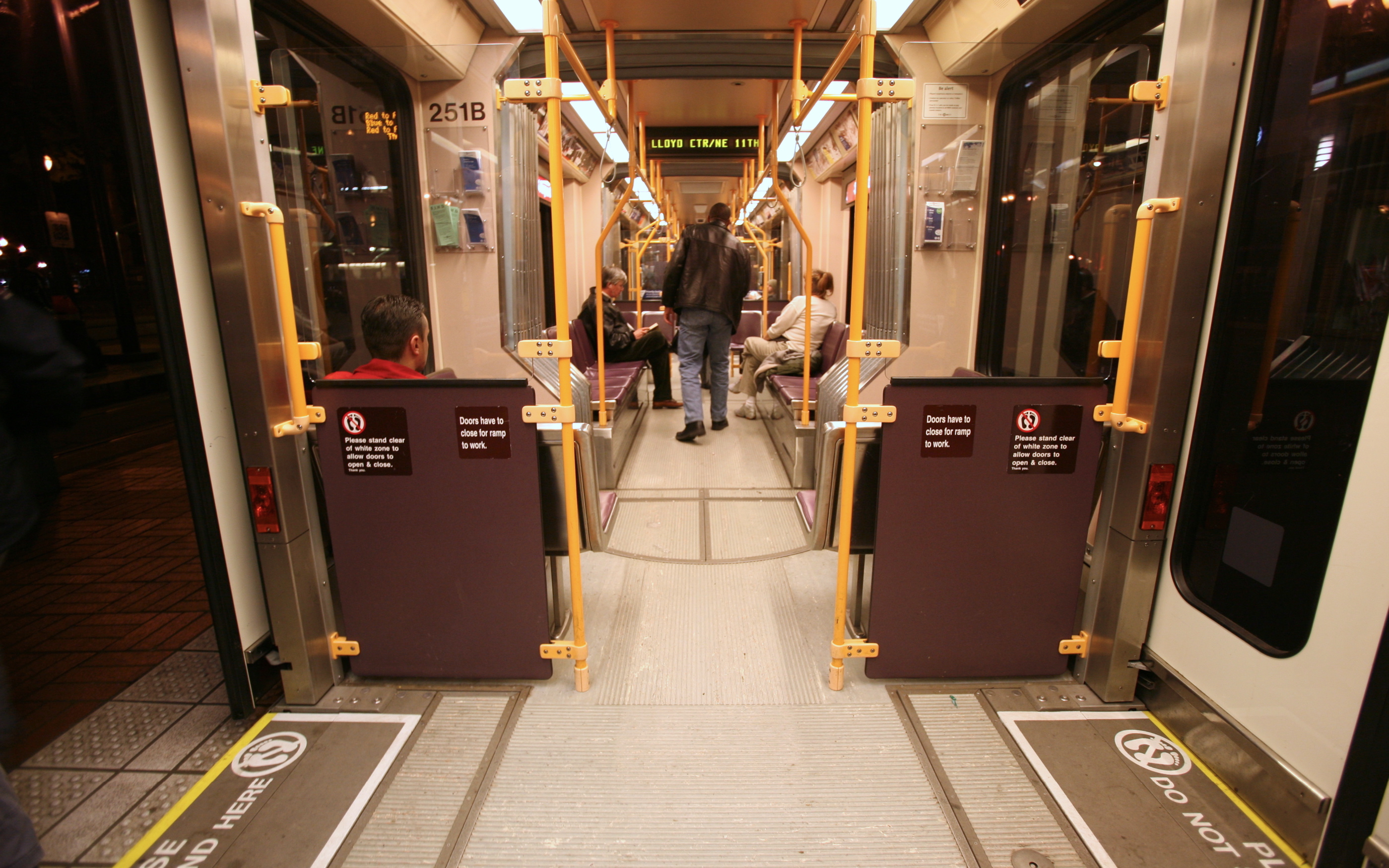
- Interior of an SD660
- Manufacturer: Siemens
- Built at: Sacramento, California
- Constructed: 1996–2005
- Entered service: 1997
- Number built: 79
- Number in service: 79
- Successor: Siemens S70/S700
- Fleet numbers: Type 2: 201–252; Type 3: 301–327
- Operator: TriMet

Specifications
- Car length: 91.93 ft (28.02 m) over couplers
- Width: 8.71 ft (2.65 m)
- Height: 13 ft (4.0 m)
- Floor height: High floor section: 3.22 ft (980 mm); Low floor section: 1.18 ft (360 mm)
- Low-floor: 70%
- Entry: Level
- Doors: 8 per car (4 per side)
- Articulated sections: 3
- Wheelbase: 5.90 ft (1,800 mm)
- Maximum speed: 55 mph (89 km/h)
- Weight: 108,000 lb (49 t)
- Traction system: Siemens IGBT–VVVF
- Traction motors: 4 × Siemens 175 kW (235 hp) 3-phase AC induction motor
- Power output: 700 kW (940 hp)
- Acceleration: 3 mph/s (1.3 m/s^{2})
- Deceleration: 3 mph/s (1.3 m/s^{2}) (service); 5 mph/s (2.2 m/s^{2}) (emergency)
- Electric systems: Overhead line, 750 V DC
- Current collection: Pantograph
- UIC classification: Bo′+2′+Bo′
- AAR wheel arrangement: B-2-B
- Minimum turning radius: 82.02 ft (25.00 m) (horizontal); 820 ft (250 m) (crest vertical); 1,150 ft (350 m) (sag vertical)
- Coupling system: Scharfenberg
- Multiple working: Within type; With Bombardier Type 1
- Track gauge: 4 ft 8 1/2 in (1,435 mm) standard gauge

The Siemens SD660, originally known as the Siemens SD600, is a double-articulated, 70%-low-floor light rail vehicle (LRV) manufactured by Siemens Transportation Systems. It was the first low-floor light rail vehicle to be used in the United States. It first entered service in 1997 with its only operator, TriMet, on the MAX light rail system in Portland, Oregon, United States.

== History ==
The initial order placed by TriMet in May 1993 was for 39 cars. It was the first order for low-floor light rail vehicles (LRVs) in North America. The order was subsequently expanded to 46 cars and ultimately to 52. TriMet received the first car, which it numbered 201, in July 1996, and the first nine cars entered service on August 31, 1997. Siemens retroactively changed the car's model designation from SD600 to SD660, a change relating to its use of AC motors running on 60 Hz instead of DC ones, in 1998. The 52nd car was received by TriMet in April 2000.

TriMet later purchased 27 more SD660s (initially 17 cars, with another 10 added to the order in 2002), which were built between 2003 and 2005. TriMet designated these "Type 3" in its fleet and numbered them 301–327. The last car was delivered in March 2005.

All 79 SD660 cars were originally equipped with rollsign-type destination signs. TriMet replaced the original signs with LED-type signs in a two-year conversion program that lasted from fall 2014 to August 2016.

== Features ==
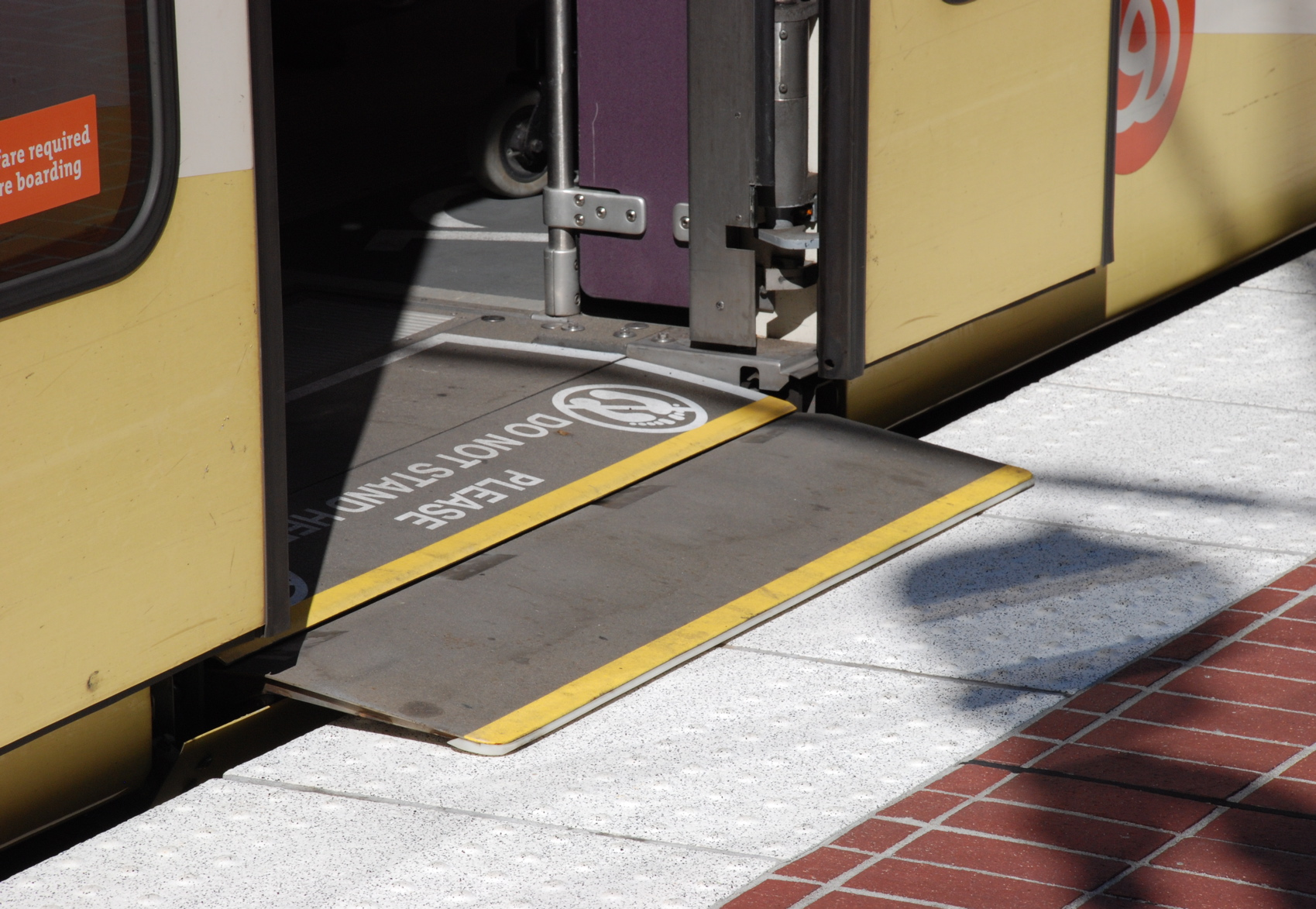
Bridgeplate on an SD660

- Bridgeplate wheelchair ramps. These are located at two of the four doorways on each side of an LRV, the two closest to the car's center.
- Bi-directional (or "double-ended"), with operating cabs at both ends

== See also ==
Other Siemens light rail vehicles for the American market:

- Siemens–Duewag U2 – high-floor LRV for either level boarding at high-platform stations or steps for passenger loading at street level
- SD-100 and SD-160 – high-floor LRV for either level boarding at high-platform stations or steps for passenger loading at street level
- SD-400 and SD-460 – high-floor LRV for both level boarding at high-platform stations and with steps for passenger loading at street level
- P2000 – high-floor LRV for level boarding at high-platform stations, custom built for Los Angeles
- S700 and S70 – low-floor LRV for passenger loading at street level
- S200 – high-floor LRV for level boarding at high-platform stations
