= Film Threat =

American online film review publication

- Film Threat homepage
- Website type: Film criticism
- Available in: English
- Owner: Chris Gore
- Editors: Chris Gore; Mark Bell
- Website: filmthreat.com
- Launched: 1985 (magazine); 1997 (website)
- Current status: Active

Film Threat is an American online film review publication, and earlier, a national magazine that focused primarily on independent film, although it also reviewed videos and DVDs of mainstream films, as well as Hollywood movies in theaters. It first appeared as a photocopied zine in 1985, created by Wayne State University students Chris Gore and André Seewood. In 1997, Film Threat was converted to a solely online resource.

The current incarnation of Film Threat accepts money from filmmakers who are looking for a way to promote their films. Since 2011, those seeking a review from the site can pay between $50 and $400 for varying levels of service, ranging from a "guaranteed review within 7–10 days" to a package that includes a guarantee of "100K minimum impressions".

== Beginning ==
The initial issues of Film Threat combined theories on cinematic narrative form and political ideology by Seewood and cinematic material and parody of mainstream film by Gore. In Gore's own words, "I thought, wouldn't it be great to start a punk rock-attitude movie magazine—and then, the people from this magazine would eventually go off and make films. Wouldn't it be great?"

In issue 9, Film Threat became a printed magazine, and also around this time, Seewood left the project to pursue independent filmmaking and to write seriously about the cinema. This second life of Film Threat included Gore and "Square Dance Instructor" Paul Zimmerman getting kicked out of the 1988 Toronto Festival of Festivals, only to return the following year under fake names representing a fake publication, Film Forum. In issue 18, San Francisco State student David E. Williams wrote in, sparking a friendship with Gore that led to both of them relocating to Los Angeles in summer 1989 to work on the magazine.

== Larry Flynt Publications ==
During the early 1990s, Film Threat was transformed as Gore attempted to find a more mainstream release for the magazine, while its new offshoot Film Threat Video Guide, edited by Williams, continued to focus on the underground films and filmmakers that the magazine had featured in its early days. Film Threat eventually found a new home with Larry Flynt Publications (LFP), relaunching in November, 1991 as Volume 2, Issue 1. "I darted to the newsstand to grab the first glossy edition of what promised to be the turning of the tide for 'Let's-Blow-and-Stroke-the-Interviewee' type film journalism. And whose face did I see? Macaulay Culkin's," stated filmmaker Kevin Smith of the first issue of Film Threat's new edition.

In 1993, the magazine—then published bimonthly—had a circulation of 125,000, and was competing with such titles as Premiere. Paul Zimmerman became executive editor in 1994, and the magazine continued to grow, but Film Threat's tenure with LFP ended after 28 issues in February 1993.

Gore managed to buy back the rights from LFP, and launched the magazine, for a third time, in December 1996. He printed only two issues, before retiring the magazine in 1997.

== Website ==
Gore launched Film Threat as a website in 1996. At first a sparse collection of film news, FilmThreat.com grew, covering both the indie and mainstream equally. Over the first 14 years of its online life, FilmThreat.com continued in the tradition of its print counterpart, courting controversy—such as when editor Ron Wells wrote a scathing criticism of Harry Knowles.

Chris Gore was succeeded as editor of the website by Ron Wells (1997–2003), who was then followed by Eric Campos (2003–6) and then Mark Bell (2006–8). Over the course of 2009, the site was edited by Don R. Lewis and Matthew Sorrento, before a brief hiatus where the site went offline in December 2009. On January 25, 2010, during the Sundance Film Festival, Gore sold the website and rights to the magazine to former editor Bell, who then relocated Film Threat to New Jersey and relaunched the website on February 23, 2010.

On May 11, 2011, Film Threat announced that it planned to produce a quarterly print and e-book edition beginning in September 2011, relying upon crowdfunding for the resources. The campaign to return Film Threat to print raised only $5,111 of its $60,000 crowd-funding goal (based on two coinciding $30000 campaigns, one of which was cancelled on June 11), and were unsuccessful in its attempt to raise the necessary monies by the conclusion of the crowdfunding campaign.

In 2011, Film Threat instituted a for-profit "unsolicited submission" service, charging independent filmmakers who wished to have their work reviewed by the site.

In 2015, Gore reacquired Film Threat and took the site offline, seeking to reboot the brand with a "Save Film Threat..." crowdfunding attempt at Kickstarter, which ran from March 19 to April 22. The attempt failed, with pledges totaling $63,725 falling short of the goal of $125,000. In late August 2016, Gore started another Kickstarter campaign to save and revamp the website with a more modest goal of $37,500. The campaign brought in $56,199 (against the stretch goal of $50,000, enabling the production of a documentary about Film Threat.)

=== Film Threat website relaunch ===
On February 6, 2017, the Film Threat website was relaunched.

It also has a presence on YouTube, where Gore reviews films, many of which are mainstream releases, alongside new personality Alan Ng. Gore also has playlists dedicated to various film festivals, and so-called "Gore Rants" where he rails against certain practices in Hollywood. One rant targeted people trying to profit from the untimely death of Collider founder John Schnepp, whom Gore knew.

== Award This! ==
Film Threat held its fifth Award This! ceremony at the Frida Cinema on December 10, 2023, a venue they have returned to since 2021. Previous events were held at Studio Movie Grill in Glendale, California.
