= OC Streetcar =

Future streetcar line in Orange County, California

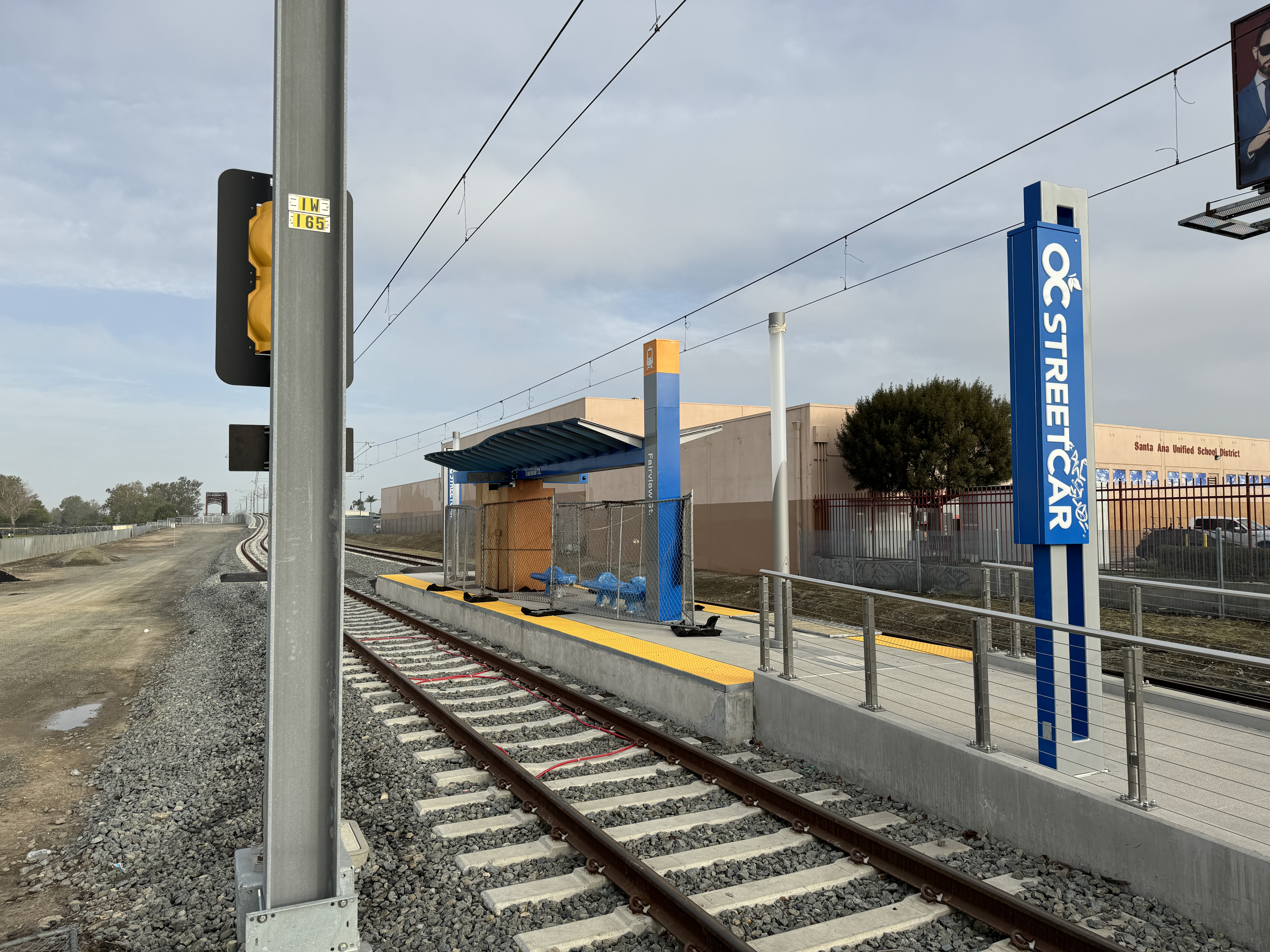
- Fairview Street station under construction in March 2025

Overview
- Status: In testing
- Owner: Orange County Transportation Authority
- Locale: Santa Ana and Garden Grove, California
- Termini: Santa Ana Regional Transportation Center; Harbor Transit Center
- Stations: 10
- Website: OC Streetcar

Service
- Type: Streetcar
- Operator: Herzog Transit Services
- Rolling stock: Siemens S700 (Note: These were model S70 when the order was placed, but in 2020 were retroactively rebranded as model S700 by Siemens.)

History
- Planned opening: March 2027; 5 months' time

Technical
- Line length: 4.15 mi (7 km)
- Track gauge: 4 ft 8 1/2 in (1,435 mm) standard gauge
- Electrification: Overhead lines, 750 V DC
- Operating speed: 11.3 mph (18.2 km/h) (avg.); 44 mph (71 km/h) (top)
Route map
OC Streetcar highlighted in orange

The OC Streetcar is a modern streetcar line currently in testing in Orange County, California, running through the cities of Santa Ana and Garden Grove. The electric-powered streetcar will be operated by the Orange County Transportation Authority (OCTA), and will serve ten stops in each direction along its 4.15-mile (6.68 km) route.

With the exception of a short loop in downtown Santa Ana, the line will be double-tracked for its entire length. Most of the route follows the original path of the Pacific Electric Railway "Red Cars" that served Santa Ana in the early 20th century, before being abandoned in 1950. Construction on the streetcar broke ground on November 30, 2018. As of May 2026, the line's expected revenue service date has been pushed to March 2027, per OCTA staff, despite initial plans for a 2021 start.

The streetcar will operate between the Santa Ana Regional Transportation Center to a new Harbor Transit Center in Garden Grove, linking the Metrolink station and downtown Santa Ana.

== Route ==
The streetcar's planned eastern terminus is the Santa Ana Regional Transportation Center, which is served by Metrolink commuter rail and the Amtrak Pacific Surfliner, as well as a number of bus routes.

From the train station, the streetcar route runs west along Santa Ana Boulevard to downtown Santa Ana and the Santa Ana Civic Center, the main administrative center for the City of Santa Ana and the County of Orange. The route will split at Mortimer Street onto existing one-way streets with westbound service continuing on Santa Ana Boulevard through Civic Center, while returning eastbound service will travel on 4th Street (two blocks south), through the Arts District.

After rejoining at Ross Street near the Santa Ana City Hall, the line will continue west along Santa Ana Boulevard to Raitt Street, where it will continue on the former Pacific Electric West Santa Ana Branch right-of-way along the north side of 4th Street. Turning northwest, the line will cross over the Santa Ana River and Westminster Avenue on bridges.

At the northwest end of the line, it will briefly enter the city of Garden Grove where an intermodal transit center will be constructed at the line's terminus at the intersection of Westminster Avenue and Harbor Boulevard. The transit center will connect streetcars to OCTA's Harbor Boulevard bus routes, which are the busiest in the county, accounting for about 8 percent of OCTA's ridership and Westminster Avenue bus routes.

== Operations and infrastructure ==
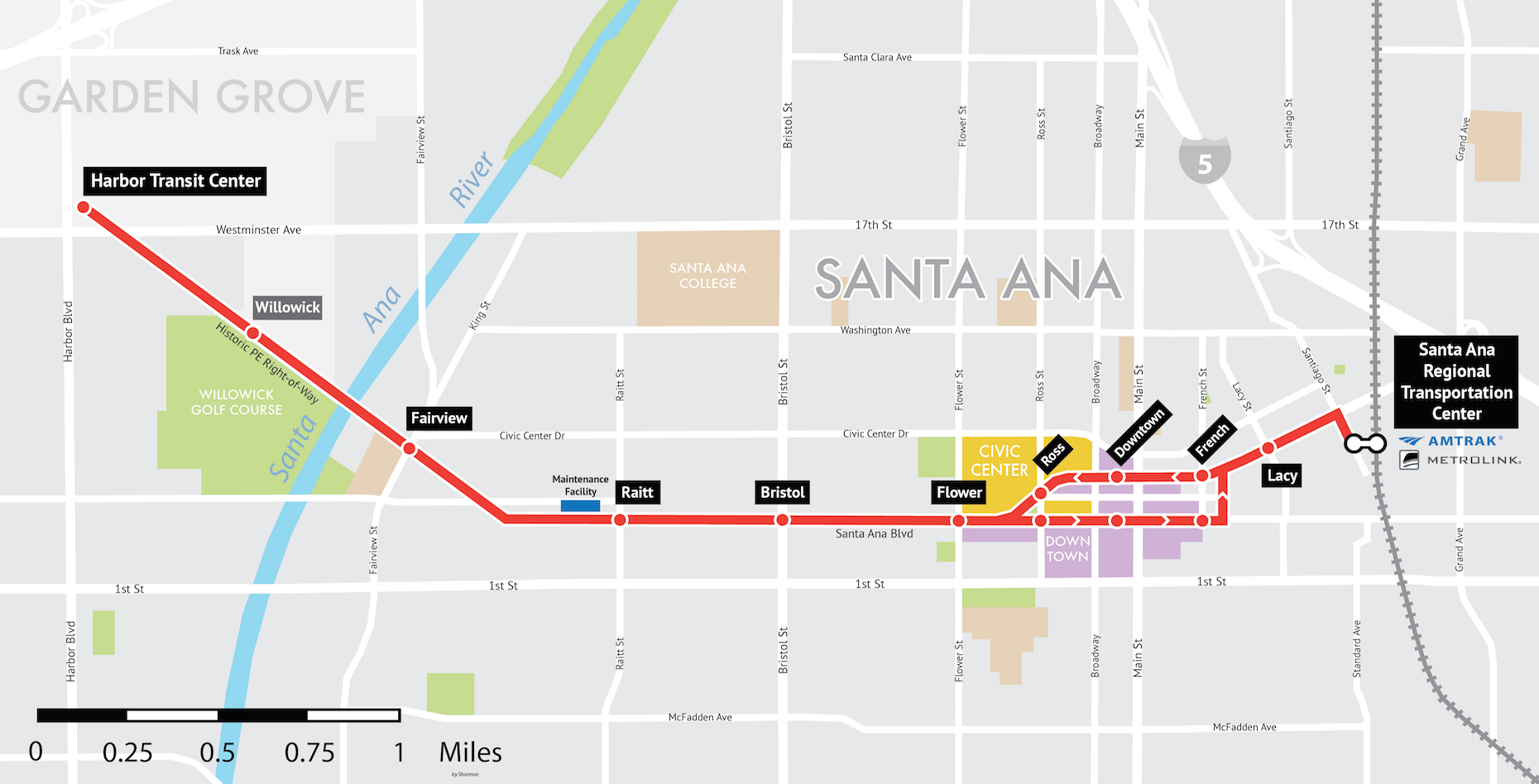
Route map of the OC Streetcar

The streetcar will operate as a curbside, street running system between the Santa Ana station and Raitt Street; west of there, it will operate in a dedicated right-of-way. The streetcar is proposed to operate from 6 a.m. to 11 p.m. Monday through Thursday; 6 a.m. to 1 a.m. on Fridays and Saturdays; and 7 a.m. to 10 p.m. on Sundays and holidays. Trains will run every 10 minutes between 6 a.m. and 6 p.m., and every 15 minutes at other hours. A single trip from end-to-end on the 4.15-mile (6.68 km) line is expected to take 22 minutes, an average speed of 11.3 miles per hour (18.2 km/h).

The route will include 10 stations in each direction, which will connect to 18 existing OCTA bus lines. Each station will include platforms near major cross streets. The route will be double-tracked for its entire length. The maintenance and storage facility will be located adjacent to 5th Street near the eastern terminus of the Pacific Electric right-of-way at Raitt Street. The Harbor Transit Center and Raitt Street station will include park and ride lots in addition to the existing parking structure at the Santa Ana train station.

Although the former Pacific Electric rail bridge over the Santa Ana River still exists, it is single-track and considered structurally inadequate due to its age. A new double-track bridge is being built parallel to the old bridge. In addition, the line will cross Westminster Avenue on an elevated bridge to reach the Harbor Transit Center in Garden Grove.

Eight Siemens S700 light rail vehicles assembled in Sacramento will service the route, with six in operation at any one time. Overhead lines will deliver power to the trains at 750 volts, direct current. OCTA projects a daily ridership of between 6,000 and 7,300 passengers, and each streetcar's total capacity is up to 180 people.

The OC Streetcar will use a proof-of-payment system, requiring valid payment before boarding and lacking a turnstile barrier at stations. Fares will be implemented using contactless smart cards, or through their Wave mobile ticketing app.

Fares will be the same as charged on OCTA's OC Bus service. Herzog Transit Services won the contract to operate the service in 2020.

=== List of stops ===
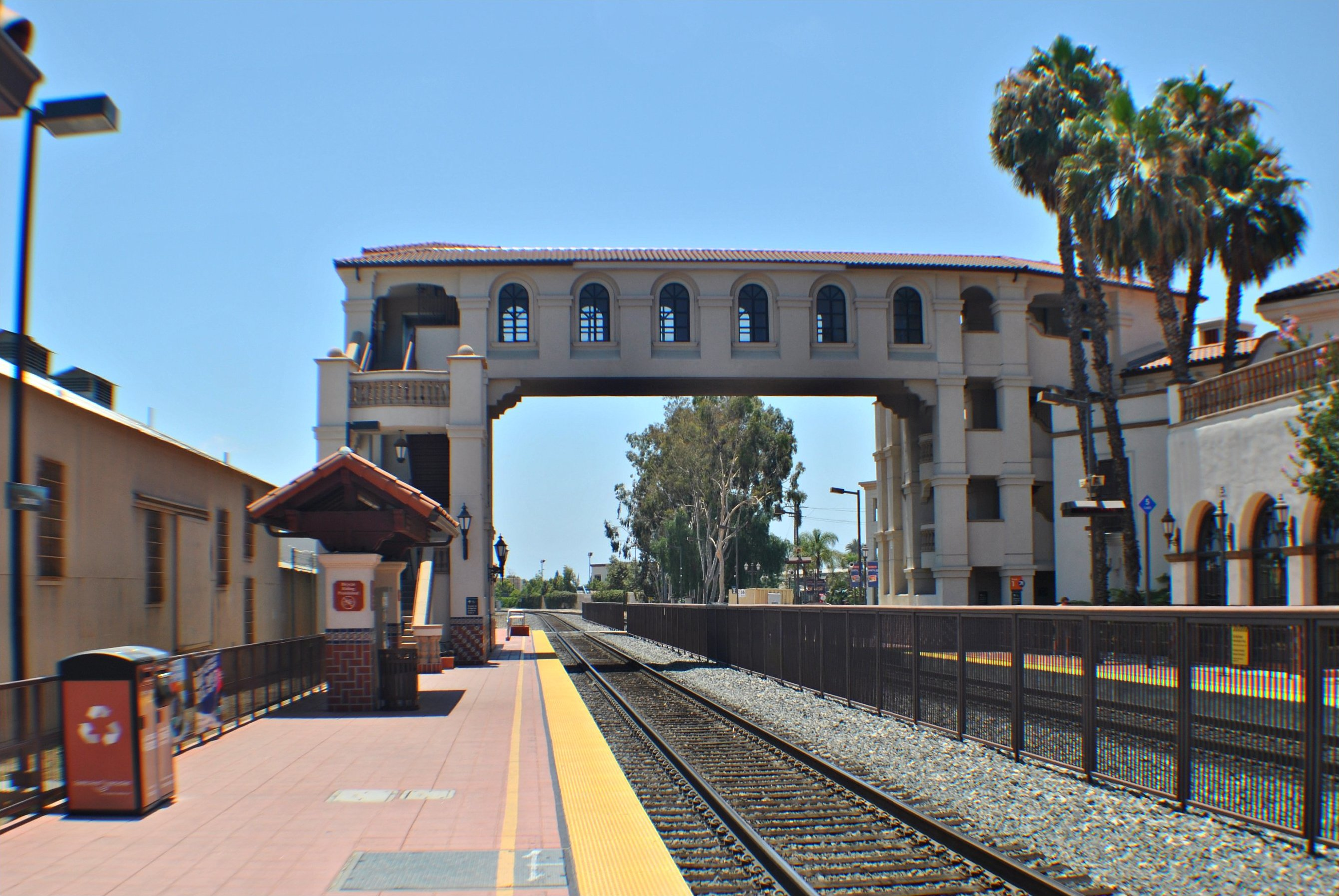
Santa Ana Regional Transportation Center, at the future eastern terminus

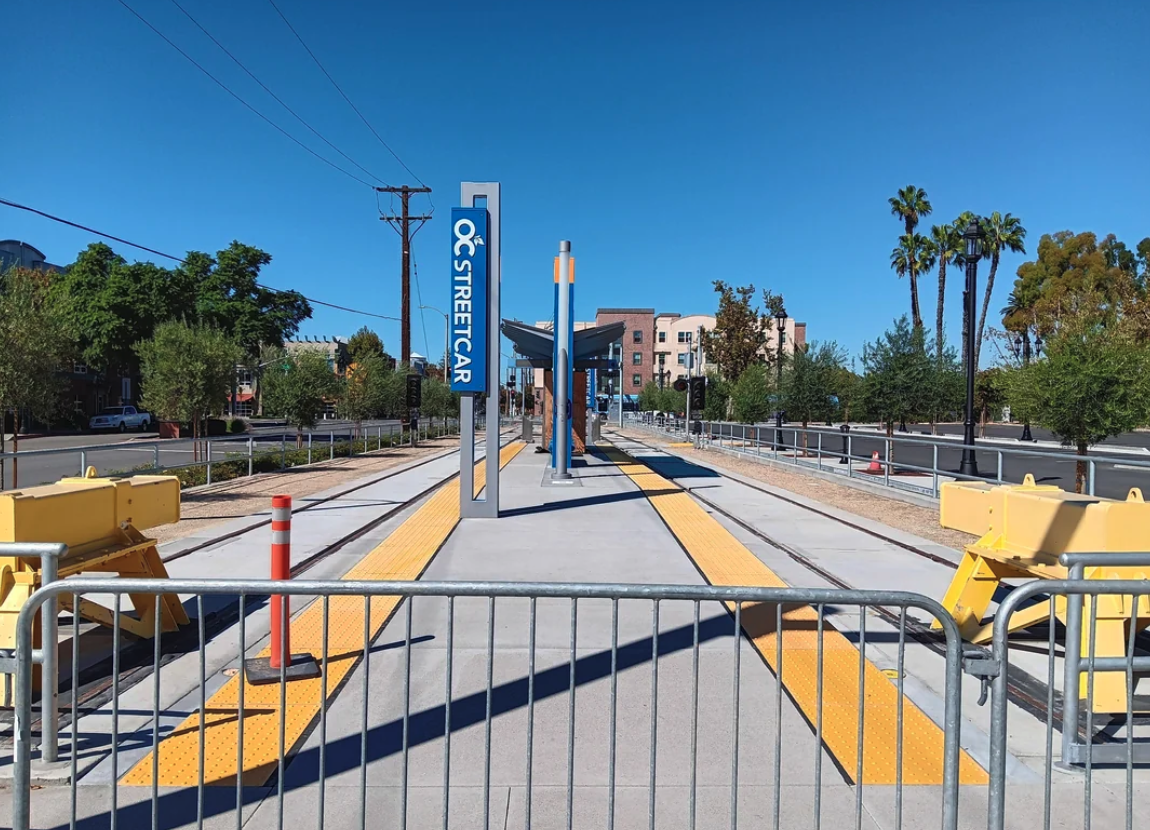
SARTC station platform

| District | Stop | Locale | Connecting services |
|---|---|---|---|
| Station District | Santa Ana Regional Transportation Center | Santa Ana Boulevard and Santiago Street, near the Santiago Arts District | Pacific Surfliner; Inland Empire–Orange County Orange County; Greyhound; OC Bus: 59, 83, 862, Rapid 560; Park and ride: 315 spaces |
| Station District | Lacy | Santa Ana Boulevard and Lacy Street | |
| Station District | French | Santa Ana Boulevard and French Street (westbound), 4th Street and French Street (eastbound), near the Yost Theater and Frida Cinema | |
| Downtown; Santa Ana | Sycamore | Santa Ana Boulevard and Sycamore Street (westbound), 4th Street and Sycamore Street (eastbound), near the Arts District and Old Orange County Courthouse | OC Bus: 53, Rapid 553 |
| Civic; Center | Ross | Santa Ana Boulevard and Ross Street (westbound), 4th Street and Ross Street (eastbound), near Santa Ana City Hall and Ronald Reagan Federal Building and Courthouse | OC Bus: 55 |
| Civic; Center | Flower | Santa Ana Boulevard and Flower Street, near Sheriff's Department, Superior Court, Department of Public Works, and Santa Ana Stadium | OC Bus: 55, 150/151, 862 |
| Artesia; Pilar | Bristol | Santa Ana Boulevard and Bristol Street | OC Bus: 57 |
| Artesia; Pilar | Raitt | Santa Ana Boulevard and Raitt Street | OC Bus: 150/151 |
| Artesia; Pilar | Fairview | Civic Center Drive and Fairview Street | OC Bus: 47, Santa Ana River Trail |
| City of Garden Grove | Willowick (potential future stop) | Near Clinton Street and Redwood Street, north of Willowick Golf Course | Santa Ana River Trail |
| City of Garden Grove | Harbor/Westminster | Westminster Avenue and Harbor Boulevard; the only station located in Garden Grove | OC Bus: 43, 60, Rapid 543, Rapid 560 |

== Background and construction ==
=== Pacific Electric ===
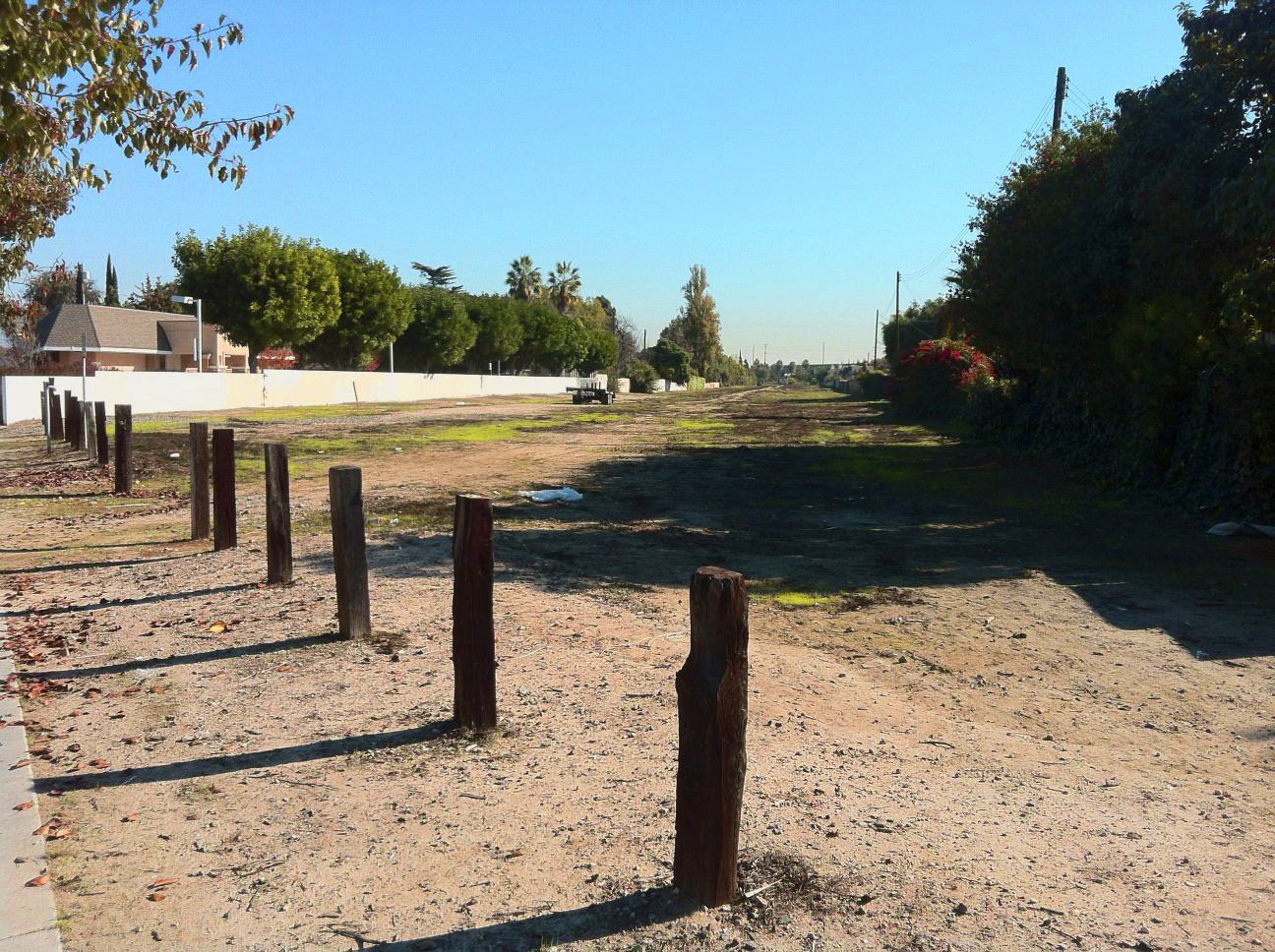
View of the old PE right of way in Garden Grove, which will be developed into the Harbor Transit Center at the streetcar's western terminus

The streetcar will partially follow the historic route of the Pacific Electric interurban railway's Santa Ana Line, whose Red Cars operated between Santa Ana and Downtown Los Angeles via the West Santa Ana Branch right-of-way starting in 1905. The Santa Ana Line began at the old Southern Pacific Station (now demolished) at Terminal Street just south of the current Santa Ana train station, and traversed downtown Santa Ana via 4th Street. Service to Orange County was terminated in 1950 due to the increasing use of automobiles and buses, resulting in competition which did not rely on being profitable like the railroad, and the original tracks through town were removed and paved over.

West of downtown Santa Ana, the original 100-foot (30 m) wide right of way – purchased by OCTA after its abandonment – remains as a strip of vacant land extending diagonally across Orange County's cardinal street grid, from Santa Ana northwest to Cypress/La Palma on the Los Angeles County line. Although OCTA has allowed some temporary uses (such as parking) in the historic right of way, and most of the tracks have been removed, the authority always intended to return this corridor to transit use in the future.

=== CenterLine proposal ===
As opposed to a streetcar system, the first proposals for a modern, second-generation light rail system serving north Orange County appeared in the 1990s. The CenterLine project would have created several light rail lines, including a main line running from Fullerton via Santa Ana to Irvine. It would have included service along the current OC Streetcar route between the Santa Ana train station and Bristol Street, but not along the diagonal West Santa Ana Branch right-of-way. Multiple branches were also proposed for the line to serve other areas of Orange County; most of the lines would have been elevated. The initial 1992 proposal called for 90 miles (140 km) of light rail, which due to political opposition was reduced to 32 miles (51 km) by 2001, and 9.3 miles (15.0 km) by 2004. The CenterLine was opposed mainly due to its high cost (more than $1 billion for the 9.3-mile (15.0 km) segment between Santa Ana and John Wayne Airport) and was ultimately canceled in 2005.

=== Current project and construction ===
A streetcar along the current, east-west route (the "Santa Ana-Garden Grove Fixed Guideway Corridor") was first proposed by OCTA in 2006. The streetcar was the result of OCTA's "Go Local" initiative, which offered funds for Orange County cities to study potential new transit links to existing Metrolink rail stations. The Measure M2 sales tax increase, also known as OC Go, will be partly used to fund transit projects in Orange County, was also passed in 2006. In 2008, the cities of Santa Ana and Garden Grove partnered with OCTA to develop the project. The design was modeled after street-running light rail services of the Portland Streetcar (Portland, Oregon) and TRAX (Salt Lake City, Utah).

Environmental reports were completed and the project qualified for federal funding status by 2015. Former President Barack Obama included $125 million for OC Streetcar in the 2016–17 federal budget under the Major Capital Investments (New Starts) program. In January 2017, Congress approved an additional $50 million in funding for the project, for a total of $175 million. The streetcar was also one of the "Top 10 State Infrastructure Projects" that Governor Jerry Brown has recommended for expedited federal review. The total funding would be 72.2 percent from the federal government, 8.6 percent from California's state cap and trade program, and 19.2 percent from the county sales tax.

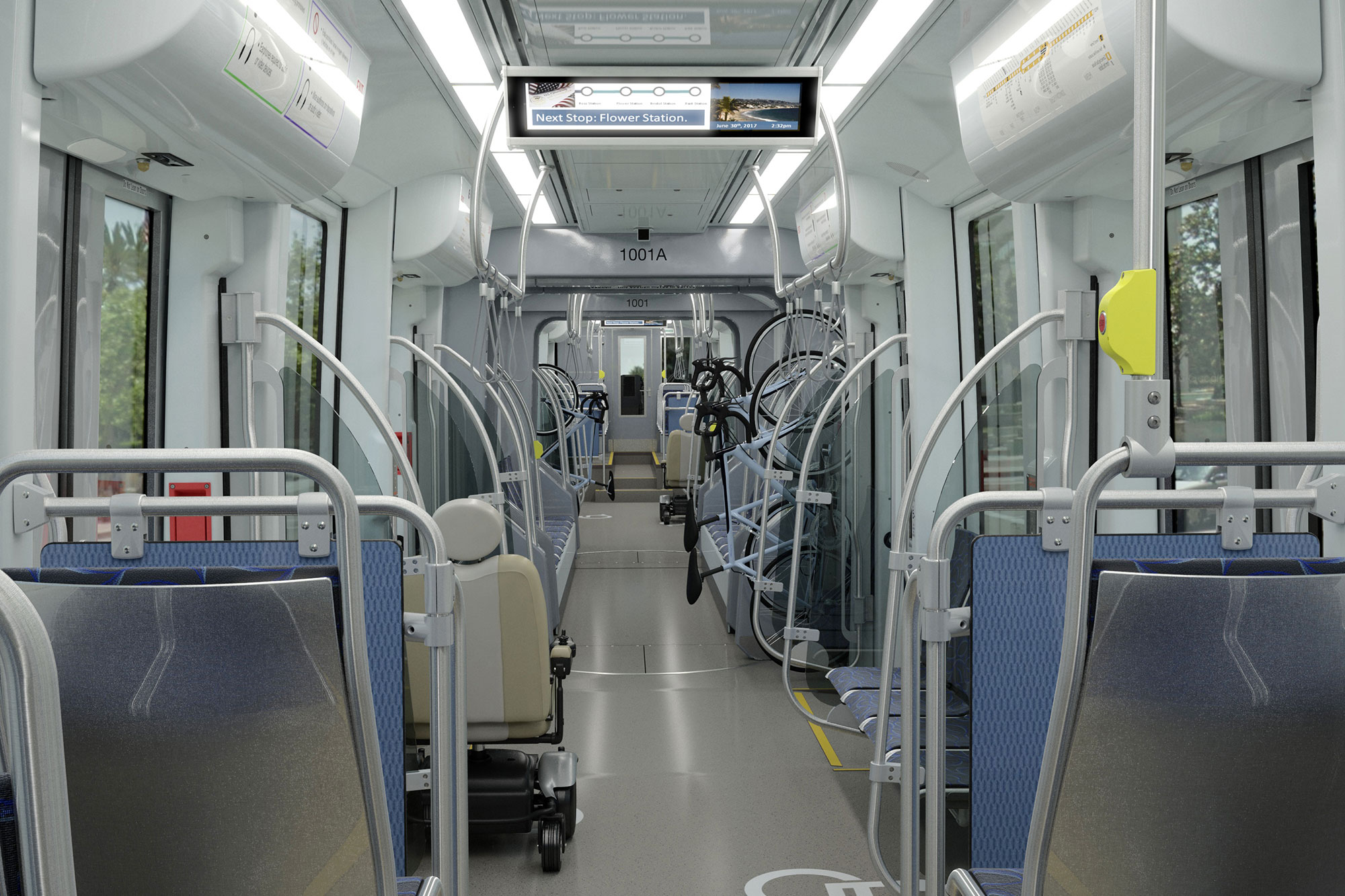
Interior of OC Streetcar vehicle

OCTA announced in September 2015 that HNTB Corporation would carry out design work. The $15 million contract covered design of tracks, bridges, stations, associated utilities and the vehicle maintenance and storage facility. In December 2016 OCTA released a request for proposals for the manufacturing and delivery of the light rail vehicles. Construction is planned to start in 2018, and revenue service was expected to begin in 2020. In March 2018, OCTA placed an order for 8 S70 vehicles (later rebranded as S700 by Siemens), at a cost of $51.5 million. By July 2018, costs had increased to a projected $407.76 million (up from an estimated $299.3 million as of June 2017) with an expected completion in 2021.

On September 24, 2018, OCTA awarded a $220.5 million contract to Walsh Construction Company to build the streetcar.

On November 30, 2018, a groundbreaking ceremony was held, and the Federal Transit Administration announced that federal funding would be increased to $217 million.

The line was expected to start operations in 2021, but the project has faced delays and setbacks, including the discovery of human remains at a construction site in September 2020 and lawsuits from Walsh Construction Company in March 2022. In October 2023, OCTA staff reported a revenue service date of August 2025 to the Federal Transit Administration. However, in February 2025 OCTA extended the opening date further to March 2026, citing "challenges related to construction," and again to March 2027 in May 2026.

On October 16, 2025, the OC Streetcar started testing on the Pacific Electric Right-of-Way, Between Raitt Street and Westminster Avenue.

On February 20, 2026, the OC Streetcar started street testing on Santa Ana Boulevard between Raitt Street and Sasscer Park.

=== Future expansions ===
Santa Ana mayor Miguel Pulido has suggested the OC Streetcar system could become "the hub of a light-rail system that could connect the county's core," with potential future extensions to Disneyland, Anaheim's Platinum Triangle and the John Wayne Airport. An extension north to Anaheim along Harbor Boulevard could connect with the Katella Avenue streetcar project, the Anaheim Rapid Connection. Although the Anaheim City Council rejected the Katella streetcar in January 2017, OCTA has listed a streetcar connection in its Central Harbor Boulevard Transit Corridor Study, leaving the possibility that it could be built as a state project, rather than a city project.

OC Streetcar is one of two current transit projects intended to use the historic West Santa Ana Branch, the other being a Los Angeles Metro Rail Southeast Gateway Line. The two services are not planned to connect; however, the possibility of re-establishing service between Santa Ana and Los Angeles has been studied by the Southern California Association of Governments (SCAG) since 2012. Restoring full service to the Pacific Electric Santa Ana Line via light rail would cost about $3 billion to construct, and is expected to serve about 80,000 riders daily.

== Impact ==
Reception of the streetcar has been mixed among business owners and residents along the proposed corridor. Supporters suggest that the project would increase property values and increase economic activity along the route, as has occurred with light rail projects such as the E Line in Los Angeles County. Underutilized areas along the route could be reappropriated for denser transit-oriented development, reducing the need for automobiles among new residents. The Willowick Golf Course in Garden Grove is being considered for redevelopment, potentially as a regional park with sports arenas and outdoor amphitheater, with mixed-used neighborhoods adjacent to a proposed stop on the streetcar route. In addition, 17.8 percent of households in the service area do not own a car, and the streetcar would markedly improve their access to the regional transit system.

However, some businesses have opposed the project, citing that customers might avoid the area during construction, and that the rail line would eliminate parking spaces and increase traffic congestion. In addition, low-income residents have expressed concern over the potential gentrification of their neighborhoods and being unable to afford increased rents as a result of the rise in property value. The streetcar project has been criticized for its high cost (currently standing at about $129 million per mile), and the inflexibility of a fixed-guideway transit system to adjust to system changes, as compared to buses.

== Gallery ==
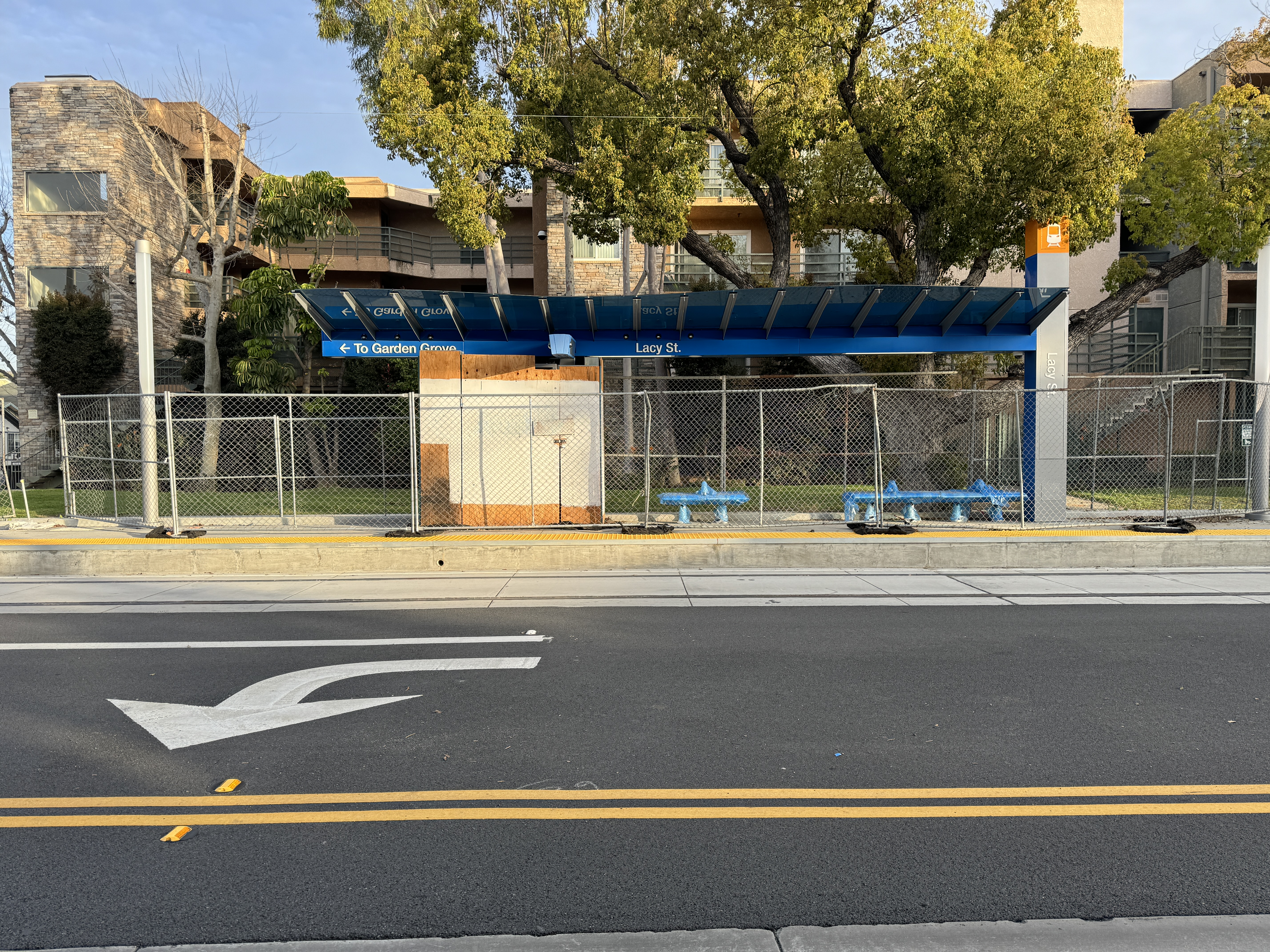
Lacy Street station westbound platform

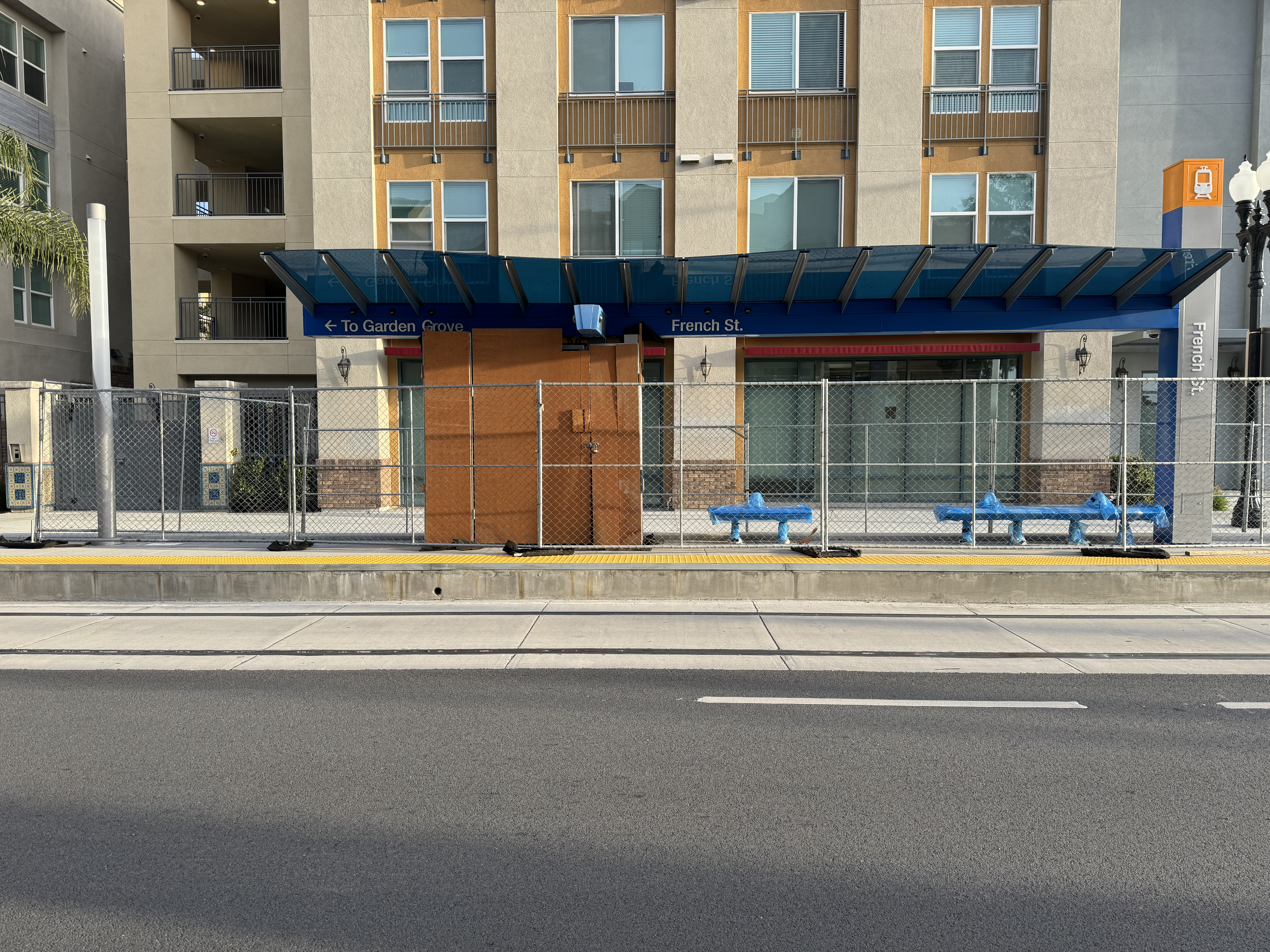
French Street station westbound platform

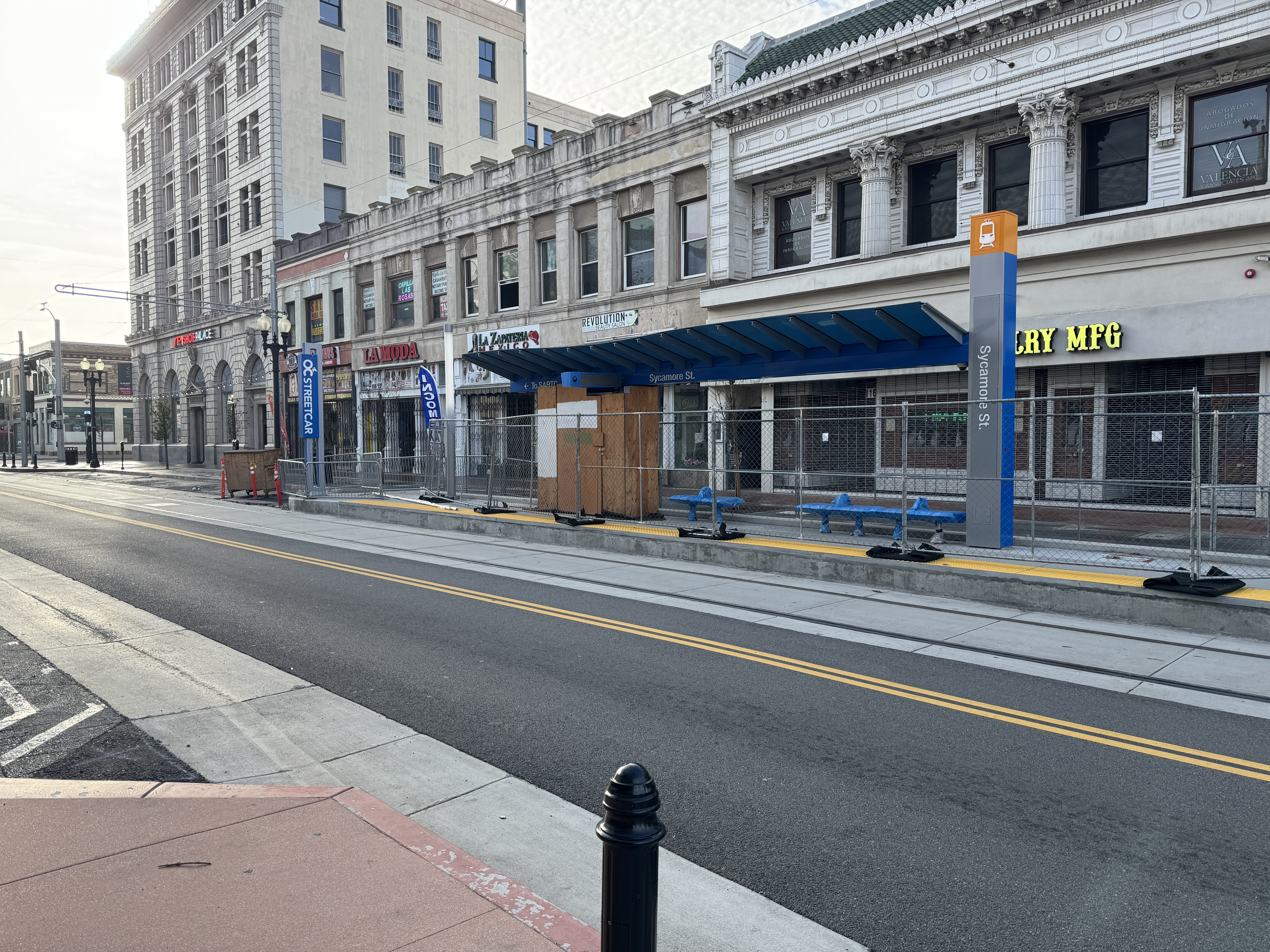
Sycamore Street station eastbound platform

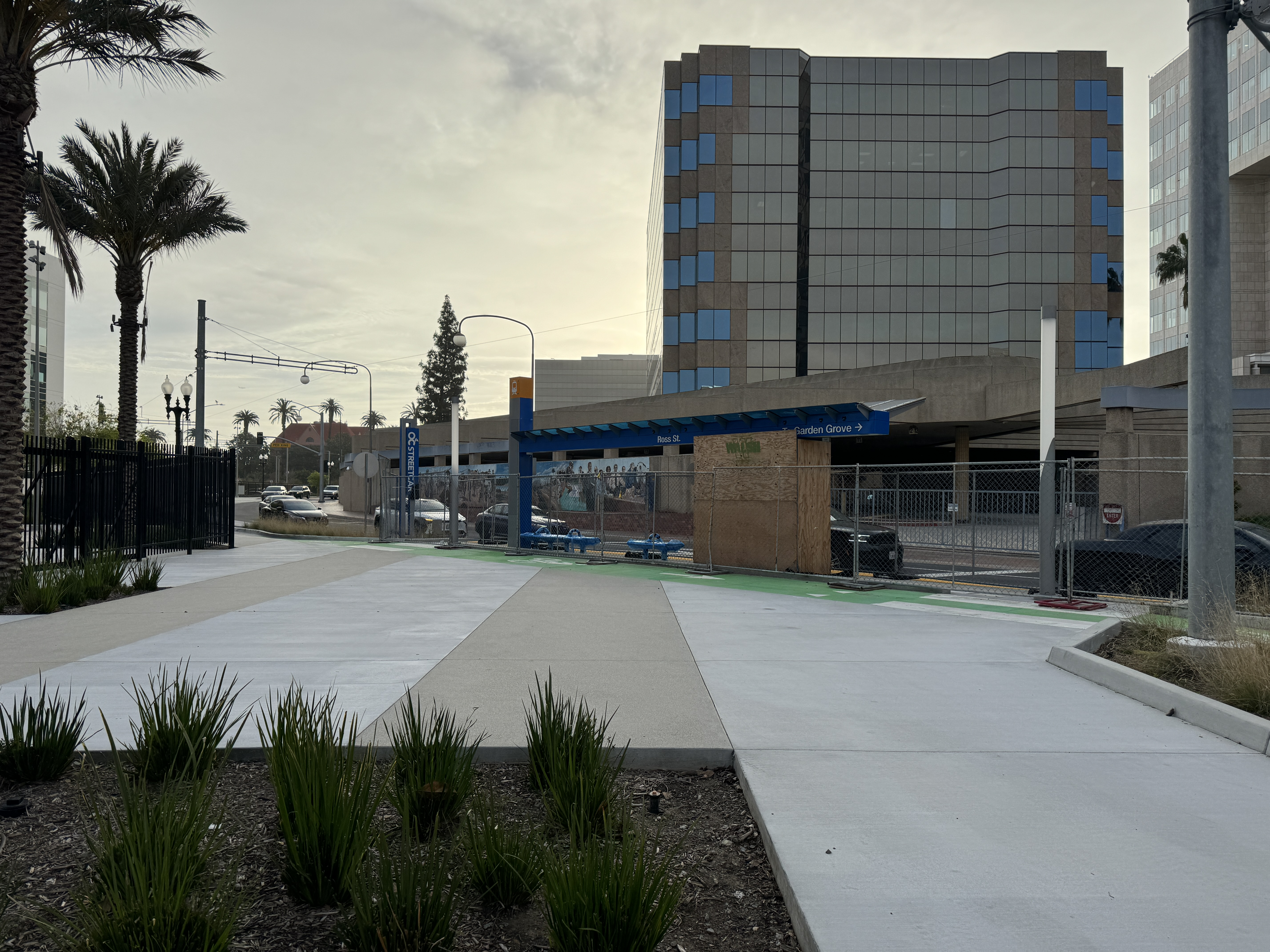
Ross Street station westbound platform

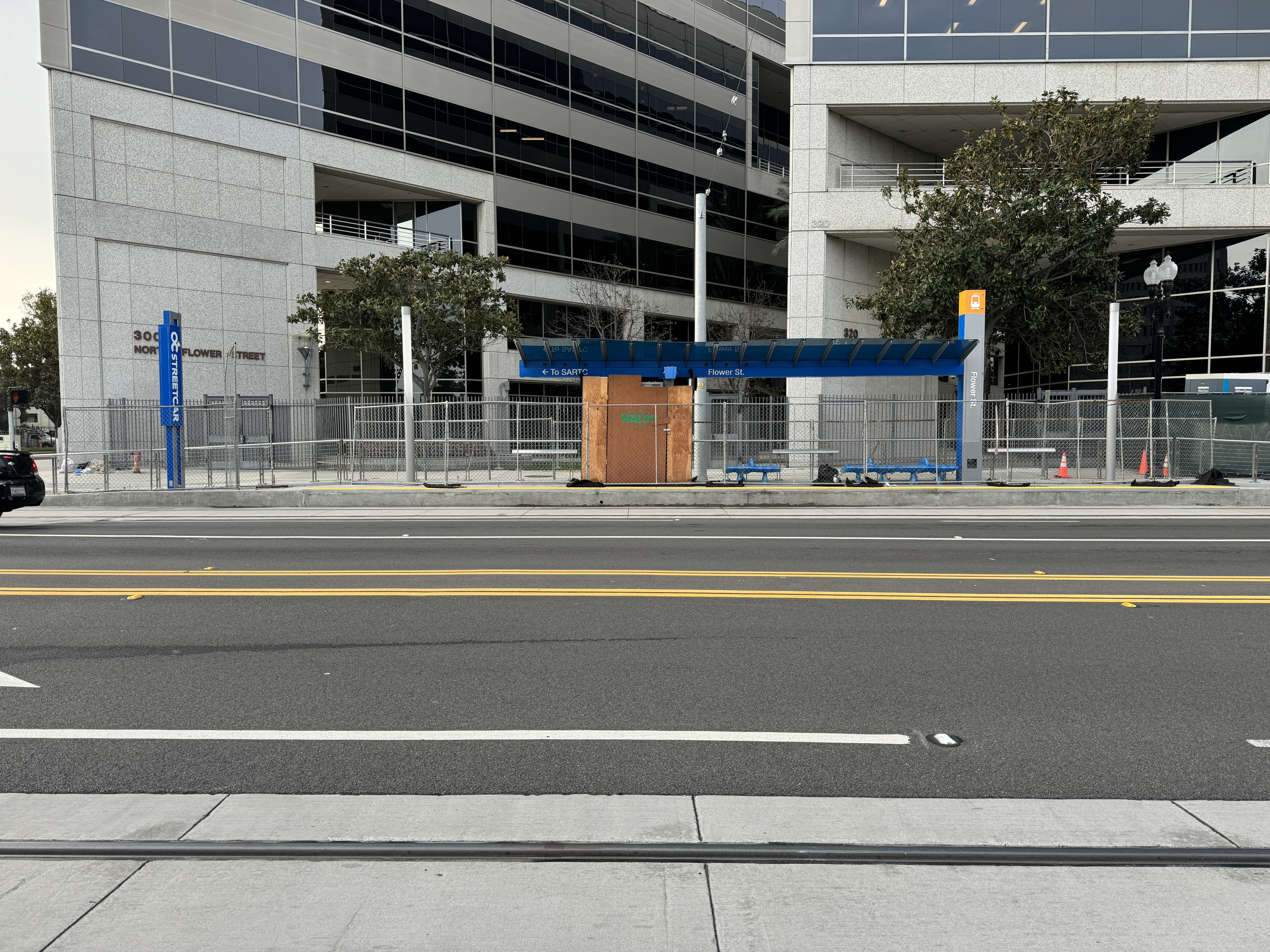
Flower Street station eastbound platform

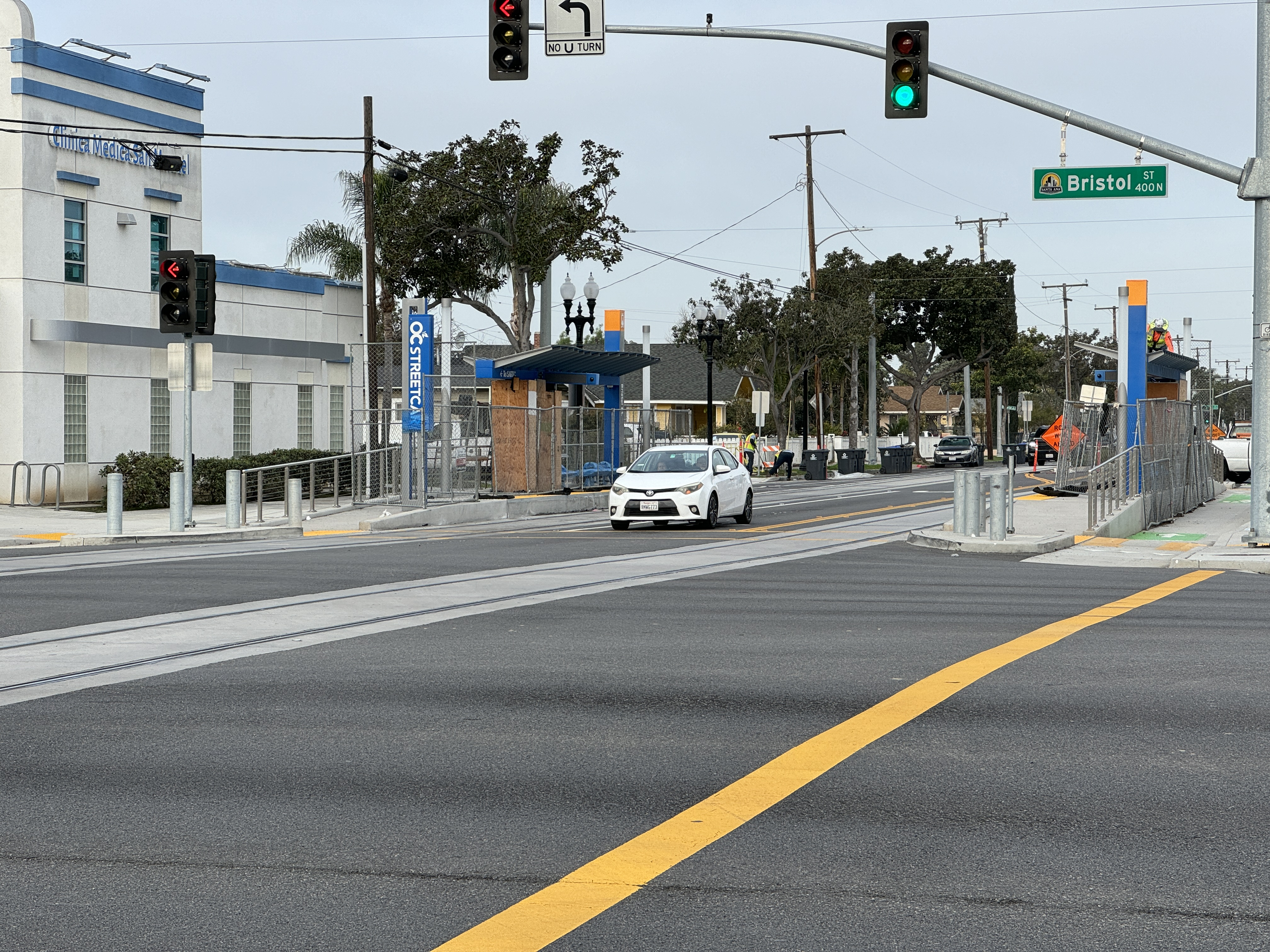
Bristol Street station platforms

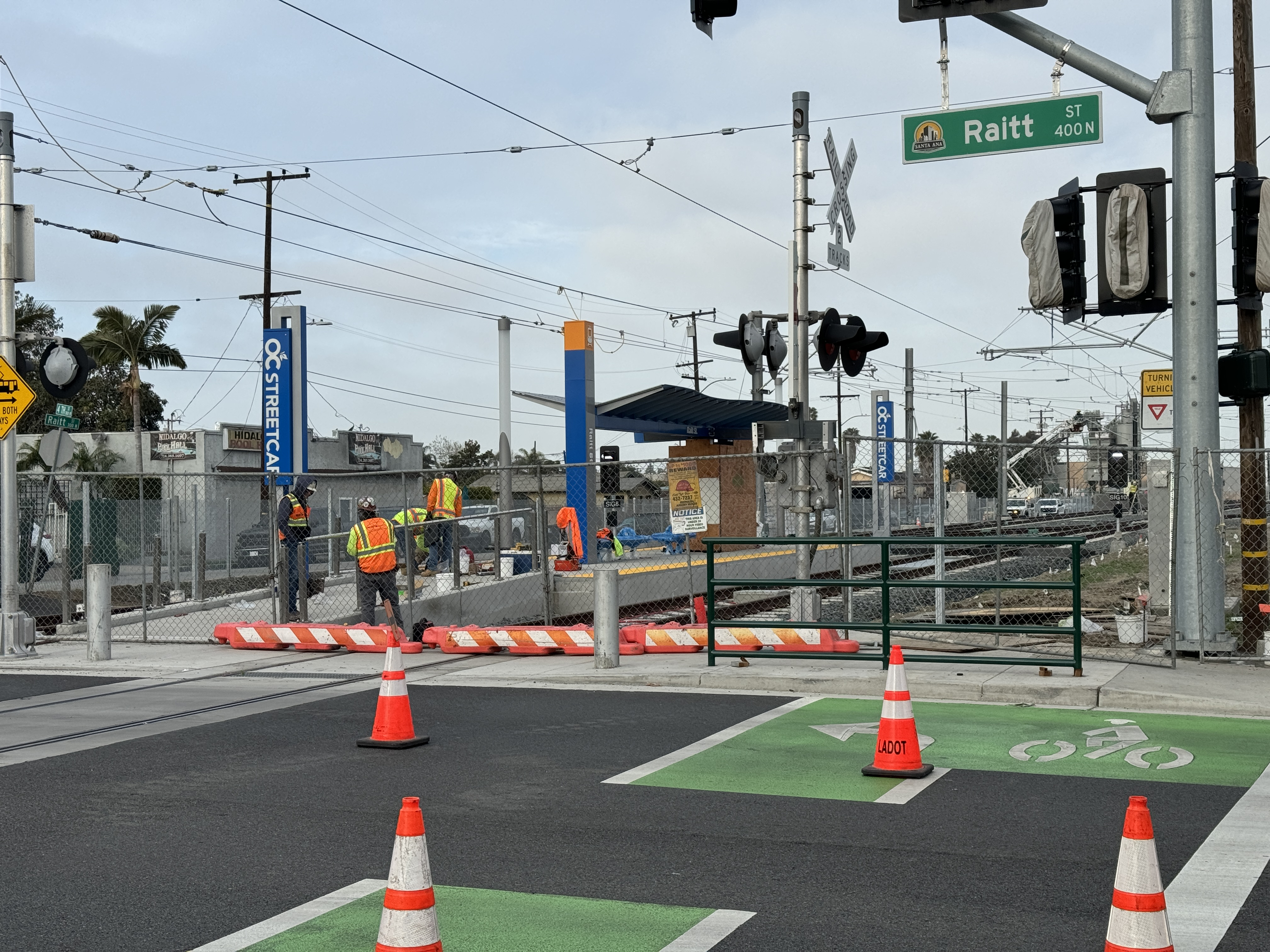
Raitt Street station platform

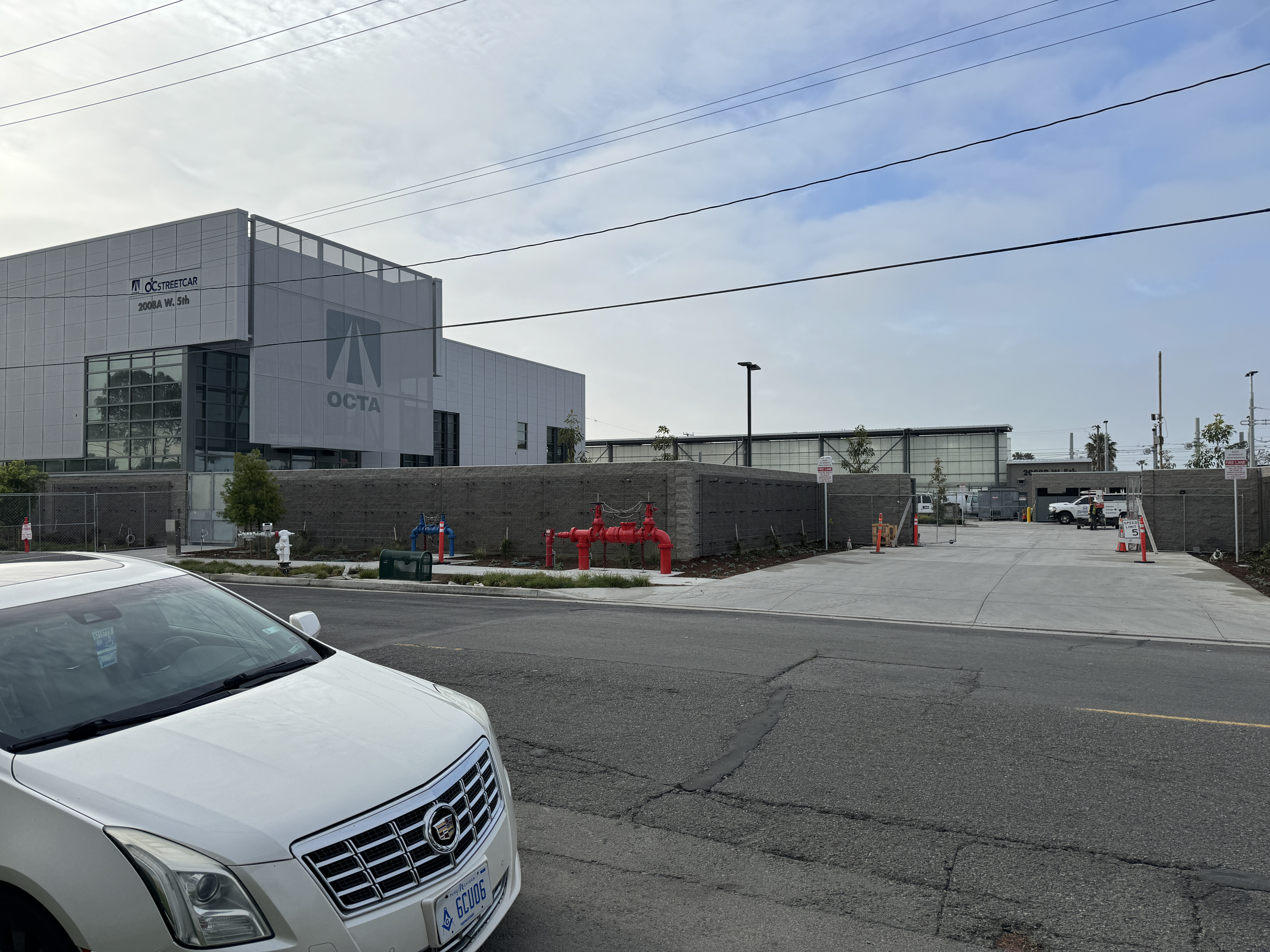
Maintenance and Storage Facility

== See also ==
- Anaheim Rapid Connection
- List of United States light rail systems by ridership
- List of rail transit systems in the United States
- Light rail in the United States
- List of North American light rail systems by ridership
- Light rail in North America
