= Delek US =

Independent refiner and marketer of petroleum products

Delek US Holdings, Inc.
- Company type: Public
- Traded as: NYSE: DK
- ISIN: US24665A1034
- Industry: Oil & Gas Refining & Marketing
- Predecessor: Petrofina, Alon USA Energy, Inc., MAPCO Express, Lion Oil Company
- Founded: 2001; 25 years ago
- Headquarters: Brentwood, Tennessee, U.S.
- Key people: Avigal Soreq (chairman, president and CEO); Reuven Spiegel (EVP and CFO); Todd O'Malley (EVP and CCO); Denise McWatters (EVP general counsel, and corporate secretary); Louis LaBella (EVP and president of refining); Jared Serff (EVP and CHRO)
- Products: Fuels
- Revenue: ▲US$16.917 billion (2023) ▼US$20.246 billion (2022)
- Operating income: ▲US$ 683 Million (FY 2019)
- Net income: ▲US$ 305 Million (FY 2019)
- Number of employees: 3,746 (2023)
- Website: www.delekus.com

Delek US Holdings, Inc. is an oil refining, logistics and biofuels company founded in 2001 and headquartered in Brentwood, Tennessee.

The company has a platform consisting of:

- Four oil refineries with approximately 300,000 barrels per day of crude through put capacity.
- Logistics operations including Delek Logistics.
- An integrated asphalt business.

== Operations ==
Refining

Delek US owns and operates four inland refineries with a combined crude throughput capacity of 302,000 barrels per day. The refineries are located in Tyler, Texas; Big Spring, Texas; Krotz Springs, Louisiana; and El Dorado, Arkansas.

Delek's refineries process primarily light crude oil sourced from the Permian Basin, East Texas, Gulf Coast and local production.

Logistics

Delek's logistics segment gathers, transports, and stores crude oil, as well as markets, distributes, transports and stores refined product in West Texas and the Southeast U.S.

Renewables

Delek owns and operates three biodiesel plants with a capacity of approximately 40 million gallons a year, which are located in Cleburne, Texas, Crossett, Arkansas and New Albany, Mississippi.

== History ==
Delek US was founded in 2001 as a fully owned subsidiary of Israeli conglomerate Delek Group. Delek US was introduced in the New York Stock Exchange in 2006, and Delek Group reduced its share over the next decade.

Key events in its history are summarized below:

Acquisitions/Divestitures

- May 2001: Acquired MAPCO Express, Inc., with 198 retail fuel and convenience stores
- April 2005: Acquired the Tyler Refinery and its related assets
- July 2006: Acquired 40 retail fuel and convenience stores from Fast Petroleum
- August 2006: Acquired refining equipment, pipelines, storage tanks and terminals from Pride Companies
- October 2011: Acquired sole ownership of Lion Oil Company, with a refinery, pipeline and other refining, product terminal, and crude oil pipeline assets in and around El Dorado, Arkansas, and product terminals in Memphis and Nashville, Tennessee
- January 2013: Announced agreement to purchase a biodiesel facility in Cleburne, Texas from EQM Technologies & Energy, Inc.
- February 2014: Announced agreement to purchase a biodiesel facility in Crossett, Arkansas
- November 2016: Completed sale of MAPCO Retail Related Assets for $535 million
- March 2018: Sold refineries in Paramount, California and Long Beach, California to World Energy LLC.
- November 2018: Announced Big Spring Crude Oil Gathering System in the Permian Basin
- May 2019: Acquired 33% Interest in Red River pipeline joint venture
- August 2019: Acquired 15% Interest in Wink to Webster Pipeline LLC
- November 2019: Announced agreement to purchase a biodiesel facility in New Albany, Mississippi
- May 2020: Sold Bakersfield refinery to Global Clean Energy Holdings
- June 2022: Acquired 3Bear Energy through Delek's master limited partnership, Delek Logistics Partners, LP. 3Bear's operations included crude oil and gas gathering, processing and transportation businesses, as well as water disposal and recycling operations in the Delaware Basin in New Mexico.
- October 2024: Sold its retail network to FEMSA.

Mergers

- May 2015: Acquired 33.7 million shares of common stock of Alon USA Energy, Inc, a subsidiary of Alon Israel Oil Co. Ltd. This represented approximately 48% of Alon USA shares outstanding in May 2015
- July 2017: Acquired the remaining shares of common stock of Alon USA Energy, Inc. Operations included refining, retail, asphalt, and renewable fuel, including Paramount Petroleum.
