= Anaheim Rapid Connection =

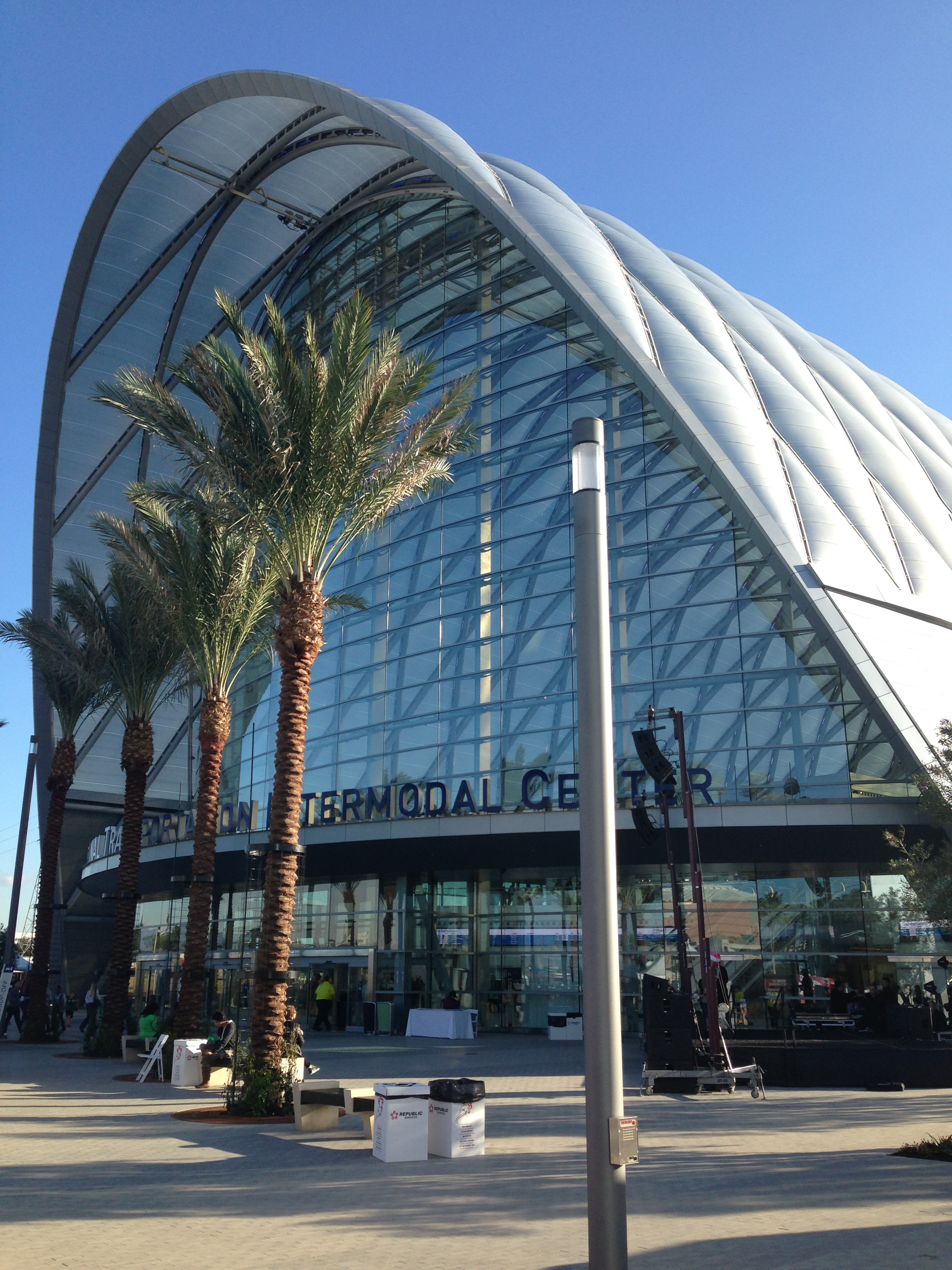
- The Anaheim Regional Transportation Intermodal Center (ARTIC) was one of the proposed locations for a stop on the streetcar system.

Overview
- Status: Cancelled
- Owner: City of Anaheim
- Locale: Anaheim, California
- Termini: ARTIC; Anaheim Convention Center
- Stations: 8

Service
- Type: Streetcar
- Services: 1

Technical
- Character: At-grade, street running

Anaheim Rapid Connection (ARC) was a proposed streetcar line in Anaheim, California. It would have been located in the Anaheim Resort and Platinum Triangle, with stops at the Disneyland Resort, the Anaheim Convention Center, and the Anaheim Regional Transportation Intermodal Center (ARTIC), among others. It has been the subject of much political controversy, which led to the project being cancelled by OCTA in 2018. Councilmembers from the cities of Anaheim and Fullerton stated opposition to the streetcar mode citing concerns about traffic impacts, safety, capital costs, and recent declining transit ridership. These cities also shared concerns about how implementation of dedicated transit lanes would impact automobile traffic.

== See also ==
- OC Streetcar
- Orange County Transportation Authority
- Streetcars in North America
- West Santa Ana Branch
