= West Santa Ana Branch =

Rail line in California, US

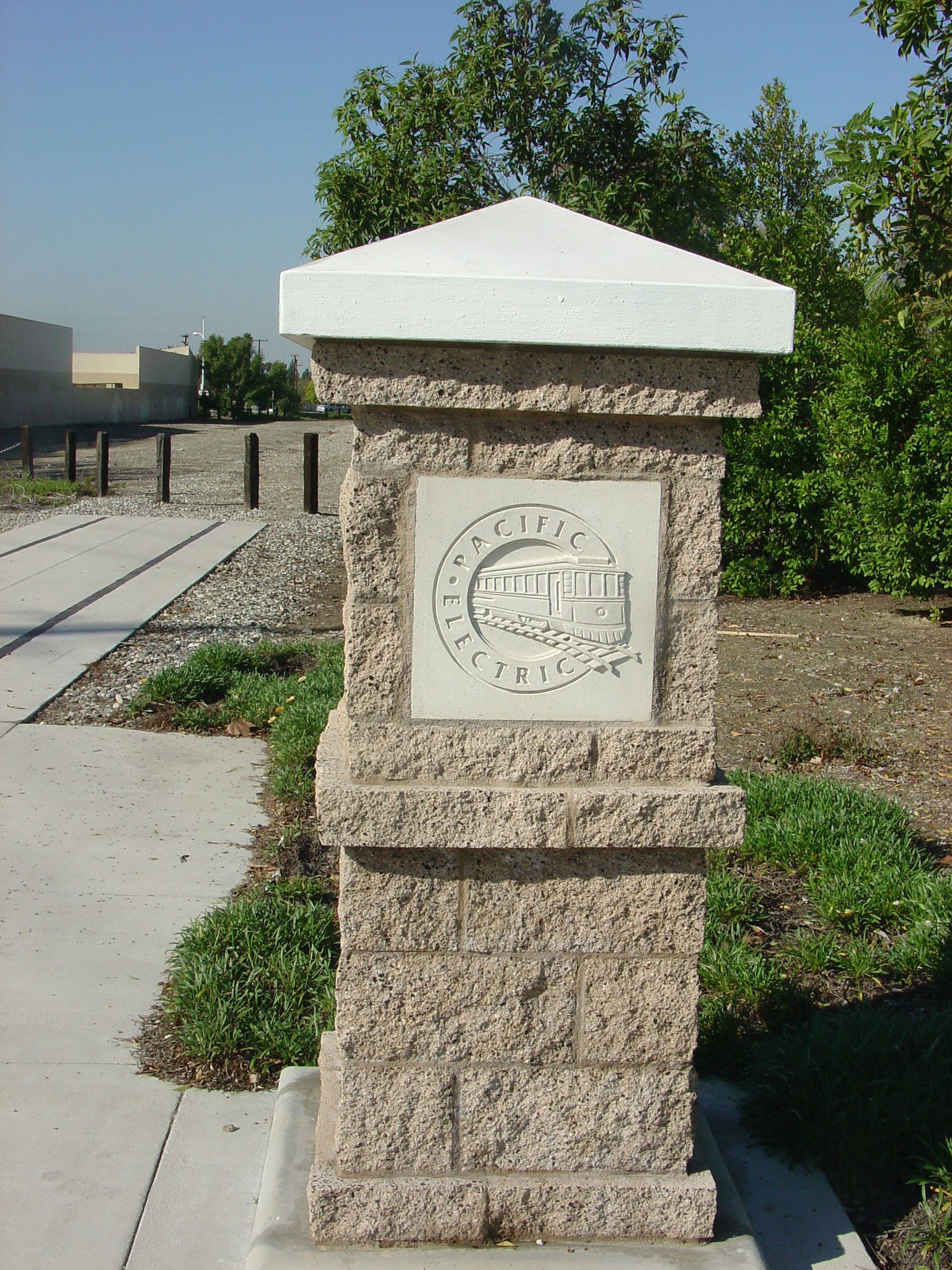
A monument along the right of way in Stanton, commemorating the Pacific Electric streetcars.

The West Santa Ana Branch is a rail right of way formerly used by the Pacific Electric's (PE) Santa Ana route in Los Angeles County and Orange County in Southern California. The Los Angeles County Metropolitan Transportation Authority (Metro) owns the segment of the right-of-way in Los Angeles County, and the Orange County Transportation Authority (OCTA) owns the segment in Orange County.

The line runs from the Watts Towers in the city of Los Angeles, southeast to the intersection of 4th Street and Santa Ana Boulevard in downtown Santa Ana. A two-mile (3.2 km) portion of it is occupied by Interstate 105 and the C Line. The right-of-way runs nearly straight on a diagonal between the two cities, in contrast to the cardinal grid of Orange County.

== History ==
The right-of-way was established as an interurban route for the Pacific Electric Railway. Grading of the route began on September 30, 1904, and service commenced in 1905. The line was double-tracked for its length except for single track bridges. One set of tracks was removed in 1941. Service was truncated to Bellflower in 1950, and finally discontinued in 1958. Southern Pacific continued to use the line for freight. Tracks on 4th Street in Santa Ana were removed in 1955 when connections to the SP line were made in Stanton. A Caltrans survey in 1981 reported that the line had been reduced to a single track railway, which had several level crossings removed and was in poor condition. The 12.5-mile (20 km) section in Orange County between Paramount and Stanton was acquired by the Southern California Regional Rail Authority in 1990 as part of the $450 million package deal with Southern Pacific (equivalent to $1.11 billion in 2025). The Century Freeway and the Green Line were constructed along a segment in Lynwood, opening in 1993 and 1995 respectively. The city of Cypress began the process of removing the seven level crossings in their jurisdiction in 1999.

=== Remnants ===
Pacific Electric Sub-Station No. 14 in Santa Ana was added to the list of National Register of Historic Places on September 22, 1983.

The Ghost Town & Calico Railroad attraction at Knott's Berry Farm uses a PE depot formerly located at Hansen station along the ROW in Stanton as the main station building. The building was moved to the theme park in 1952.

The Bellflower station was restored to its opening condition in 2008.

Despite the inactivity of the line, parts of the right-of-way still hold tracks that are in working order. For example, a warehouse stub of the San Pedro Branch Rail is located between Garfield Avenue and Rosecrans Avenue. The Paramount Industrial Lead, another branch of the San Pedro Branch Rail, also occupies the right-of-way with a non-gated level crossing at the intersection of Rosecrans Avenue and Paramount Boulevard, a gated crossing at Downey Avenue, and a depot near Somerset Boulevard's Paramount Petroleum plant.

Several disconnected and dilapidated fragments of tracks remain at random intervals throughout the right-of-way.

== Future development ==
The Southern California Association of Governments (SCAG), in conjunction with Metro and OCTA, conducted an alternatives analysis to determine the list of all feasible alternatives for the project. These alternatives may use all or part of the ROW. Modes under consideration were bus rapid transit, light rail, commuter rail and high-speed rail. SCAG organized a first round of public meetings in June 2010. A second round of public meetings were held in November and December 2010. All currently planned projects on the WSAB right-of-way have been various forms of light rail, including modern streetcars using light-rail vehicles (LRVs).

=== Los Angeles Metro project ===
Metro has prioritized the corridor on its Long Range Transportation Plan (LRTP), and funding for it was guaranteed in the LA County Measure R and Measure M transportation funding ballot measures. As proposed, the light rail line will travel between Artesia and Union Station, using the ROW between Paramount and Artesia.

=== OC Streetcar ===
As of 2016, the Orange County Transportation Authority (OCTA) is collaborating with the cities of Santa Ana and Garden Grove to build a streetcar line. The western terminus of the proposed route would follow the Pacific Electric right-of-way near the intersection of Harbor Boulevard and Westminster Avenue in Garden Grove.

== See also ==
- Anaheim Rapid Connection
