= Frida Cinema =

Non-profit movie theater in Santa Ana, California

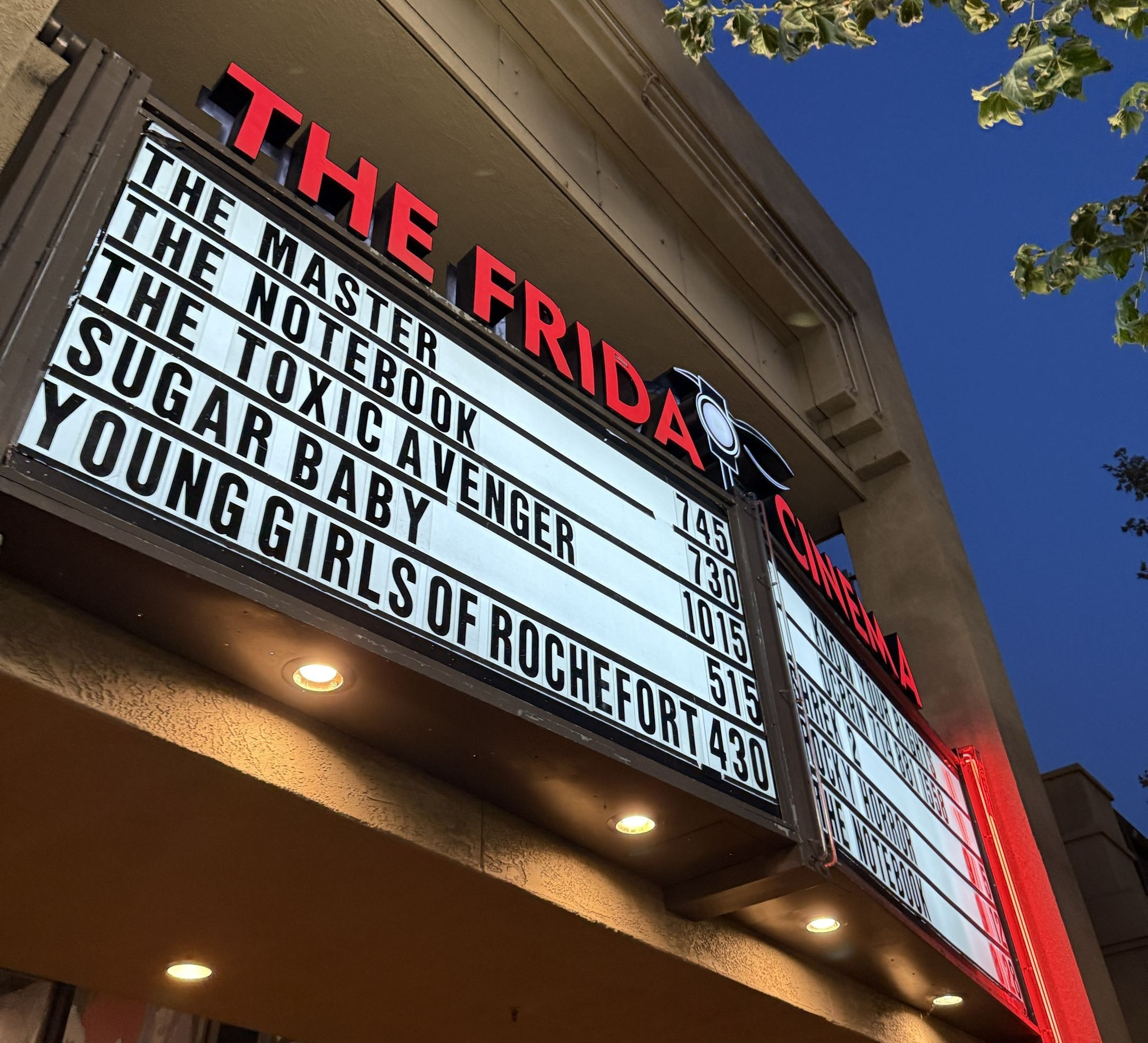
- The Frida's marquee in 2025
- Interactive map of Frida Cinema
- Address: 305 E 4th Street; Santa Ana, California, U.S.
- Coordinates: 33°44′53″N 117°51′55″W
- Type: Arthouse movie theater
- Screen: 2
- Public transit: OC Streetcar: French (beginning 2025)

Construction
- Opened: February 21, 2014; 12 years ago

Website
- thefridacinema.org

The Frida Cinema is a non-profit arthouse movie theater in Santa Ana, California. The theater, named after Mexican painter Frida Kahlo, is located in the 4th Street Market shopping district of the East End neighborhood in Downtown Santa Ana. The Frida has two screens and is the only non-profit theater in Orange County, California. The theater screens vintage blockbusters, cult classics, and independent films.

== History ==
From 1985 until the end of 2013, the Fiesta Twin Theatre was operated as a mainstream theater screening blockbusters with Spanish-language subtitles. In February 2013, the facility was leased by Logan Crow, a cinema proprietor with previous arthouse operations in Long Beach. The Fiesta Twin Theatre remained in operation for a year under Crow's lease until it was reopened as the Frida Cinema on February 21, 2014. It opened with the 2014 edition of the South East European Film Festival. The first public screening at the Frida was a showing of Tango Abrazos, a Slovenian romantic comedy.

In 2020, the Frida was closed indefinitely in response to the COVID-19 pandemic. During the pandemic, the theater organization operated a drive-in theater in Tustin. In April 2021, the theater re-opened with tentative facemask and capacity restrictions. In January 2022, the Frida postponed its events amidst the spread of the Omicron variant of the COVID-19 virus.

On February 21, 2023, the Frida Cinema celebrated its ninth anniversary with a screening of the 1998 Coen brothers comedy The Big Lebowski and an associated themed party. Moviegoers wore costumes of characters from the film and were served White Russian cocktails, a drink popularized by the movie. On March 17, 2023, the Frida hosted a Jesus Christ Superstar screening and cast reunion for the film's 50th anniversary.
