= Paramount Petroleum =

Company headquartered in Paramount, Los Angeles County, California

- Industry: Oil Refining
- Successor: Delek US
- Headquarters: Paramount, Los Angeles County, California, United States
- Key people: Bill Thorpe
- Parent: Alon USA
- Website: www.ppcla.com

Paramount Petroleum Corporation was headquartered in Paramount, Los Angeles County, California. It operated a refinery at that location, and was the largest seller of asphalt in California.

Paramount also operated a refinery near Portland, Oregon, as well as several marketing terminals in the Western United States.

== Company ==
Paramount had been a subsidiary of Alon USA, a publicly traded refining and marketing company (NYSE:ALJ), since 2006. The president of the company was Alan P Moret. The company was largely financed by two prominent multi billionaires of the United States.

Delek US acquired Alon USA in 2017.
