= Siemens S200 =

Series of high-floor light rail vehicles built by Siemens Mobility

Siemens S200 LRV
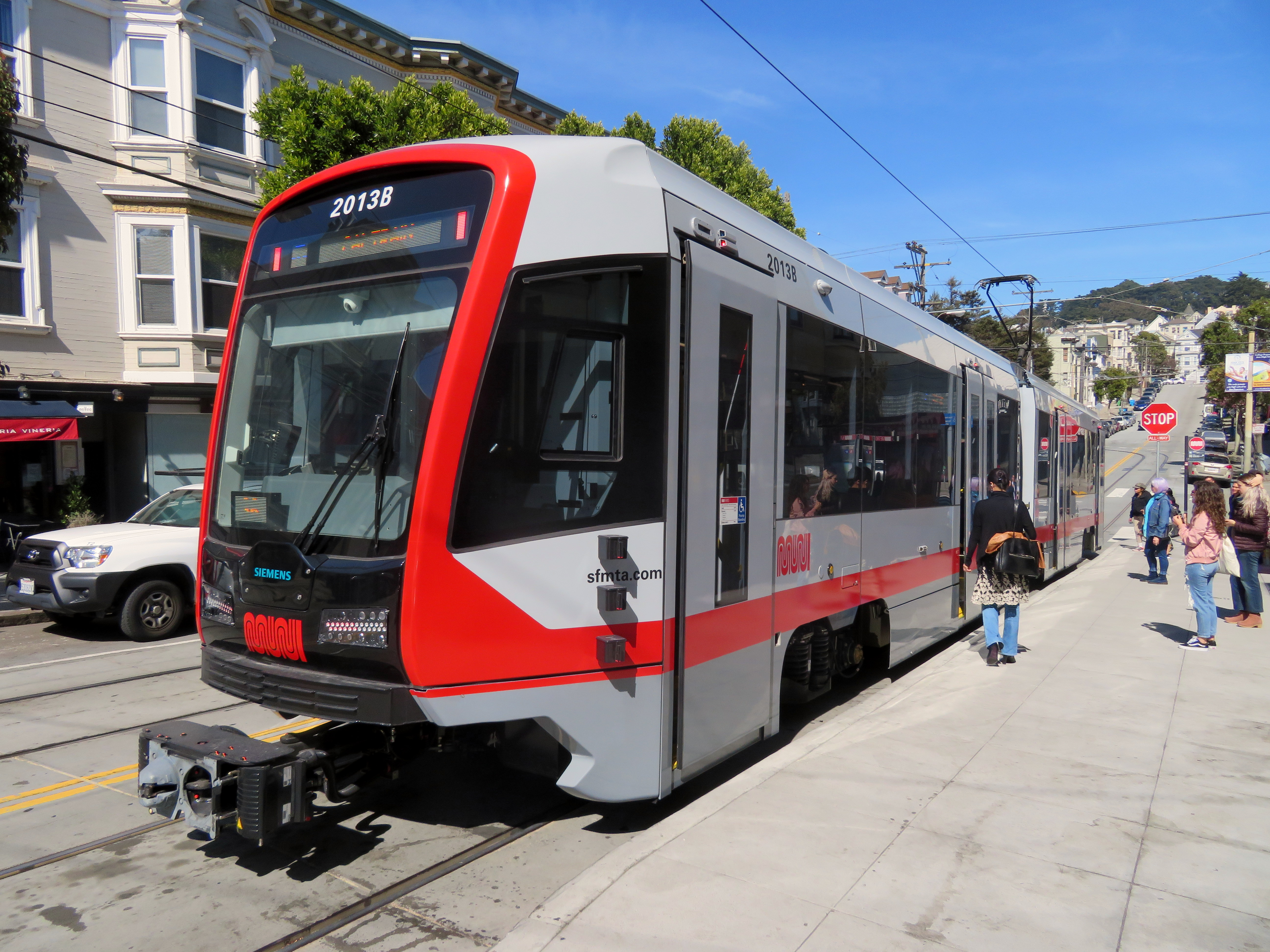
- S200 SF of San Francisco Muni in April 2018
- Stock type: Light rail vehicle
- In service: 2016–present
- Manufacturer: Siemens USA
- Built at: Florin, California
- Constructed: 2015–present
- Number built: 405 (includes units on order; see Operators section for details)
- Number in service: 69 (Calgary); ~150 (San Francisco)
- Predecessor: Siemens SD-400 and SD-460
- Capacity: 250–300
- Operators: Calgary Transit; Greater Cleveland Regional Transit Authority; Metro Transit (St. Louis); San Francisco Municipal Railway

Specifications
- Car length: 75–89 ft (23–27 m)
- Width: 104.32 in (2.650 m)
- Height: 11.5–13.5 ft (3.5–4.1 m)
- Floor height: 3.2 ft (0.98 m) (Calgary); 2.8 ft (0.85 m) (SF); 3.4 ft (1.0 m) (Cleveland); 3.3 ft (1.0 m) (St. Louis)
- Entry: Level boarding (Calgary, Cleveland, St. Louis); Level boarding with retractable steps (SF)
- Doors: 8 plug doors
- Articulated sections: 2 (one articulation)
- Maximum speed: 60 mph (97 km/h)
- Weight: 76,000–97,328 lb (34,473–44,147 kg)
- Steep gradient: 10%
- Power output: 696–776 hp (519–579 kW)
- Acceleration: 3.0 mph/s (1.3 m/s^{2}) maximum
- Deceleration: 5.0 mph/s (2.2 m/s^{2}) maximum
- Electric systems: Overhead line; 600 V DC (Calgary, SF, Cleveland); 860 V DC (St. Louis)
- Current collection: Faiveley pantograph
- UIC classification: Bo′(2)′Bo′
- AAR wheel arrangement: B-2-B
- Minimum turning radius: 82 ft (25 m); 42 ft 7 in (12.98 m) (SF)
- Coupling system: Scharfenberg
- Headlight type: Light Emitting Diode
- Track gauge: 4 ft 8 1/2 in (1,435 mm) standard gauge

The Siemens S200 is a high-floor light rail vehicle (LRV) manufactured by Siemens Mobility in Florin, California, beginning service in 2016.

The S200 succeeds earlier Siemens high-floor LRV models, including the SD-100/SD-160 and the SD-400/SD-460. Its low-floor counterpart is the Siemens S700. The S200 is designed specifically for the North American market and is built to the specifications of each individual operator.

== Description and predecessors ==
The S200 is a new design by Siemens for the North American market, building upon its previous models. Siemens entered the North American light rail market in the late 1970s with the Siemens–Duewag U2, which was initially built in Düsseldorf, West Germany. The U2's successors in the high-floor LRV market were manufactured in Florin, California, along with low-floor designs including the SD660 and the S70/S700.

Calgary Transit selected Siemens to manufacture 60 light rail vehicles in 2013, to replace part of its initial fleet of U2 trains. The S200 was designed for service in Calgary, whose CTrain system uses high platforms for level boarding. The second customer, the San Francisco Municipal Railway, uses a combination of high platforms and street-level stops for its Muni Metro system. This distinct environment prompted the inclusion of retractable stairs in San Francisco's S200 trains, which entered service in 2017.

The basic design of the S200 is a high-floor design, designed for level boarding. The design is customized for each operator, to account for varying platform heights, loading gauges, and service requirements. All S200 vehicles are powered by direct current, collected from overhead lines with a pantograph.

== Operators ==
Owner	Qty.
Calgary Transit	84
Greater Cleveland Regional Transit Authority	54
Metro Transit (St. Louis)	48
San Francisco Municipal Railway	219
Total	405

=== Calgary ===
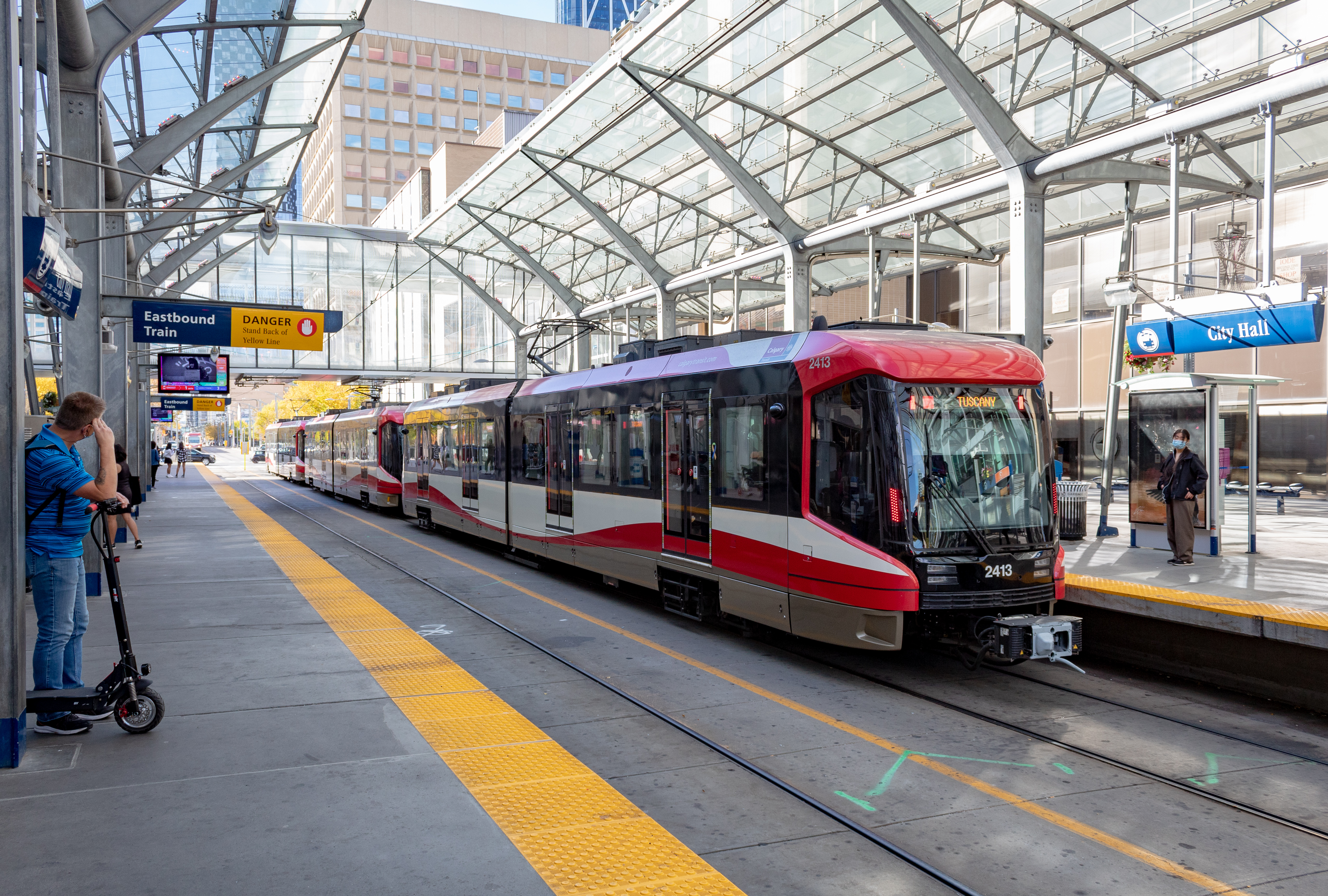
An S200 in Calgary in 2021

In September 2013, 60 light rail vehicles were ordered, costing $200 million, for the Calgary CTrain; the order was later slightly expanded to 63 LRVs at a cost of $201.6 million. The first car was delivered on January 6, 2016.

Later, an additional 6 cars were ordered. The first of this order was delivered in May 2019 and was put into service on July 11, 2019.

In February 2020, 15 more LRVs were ordered bringing the total fleet to 84 S200 LRVs.

The new cars feature a host of new and upgraded technologies. Heated floors and triple-pane windows were added to combat Calgary's harsh winter climate, as well as sloped entryways to eliminate moving ramps found on older trains. A new speaker system adjusts the volume output depending on the number of passengers in each car. Dynamic interior LED lights adjust to become brighter when it is dark and dimmer when light is shining through the windows. The end doors were moved back to improve passenger flow and include LED lights to indicate if a door can be opened or if it is closing/locked. New infotainment systems were added alongside LED info signs to display next stop and line information. It is also capable of showing advertisements, although it has not been implemented yet. Some of these features (LCD information screens, security cameras, LED exterior signs) have been implemented on the refurbished Siemens SD-160 cars as part of mid-lifecycle refurbishment.

=== San Francisco ===
Siemens have designated the S200 light rail vehicles for San Francisco as S200 SF, and the San Francisco Municipal Transportation Agency internally designates them as the LRV4. San Francisco's S200 LRVs succeed prior LRV designs from Boeing-Vertol (LRV1) and AnsaldoBreda (LRV2 and LRV3).

SFMTA ordered 175 LRVs in September 2014 at a total cost of $648 million. Additional S200 LRVs were ordered in 2015, 2017, and 2021. The S200 trains will replace the entire Muni Metro fleet, and will provide additional capacity for service expansions. These expansions include additional game day service to the Chase Center and full service on the Central Subway.

The first S200 LRV for the Muni Metro entered service on November 17, 2017, and the final LRV of the 219-vehicle order is expected to be delivered in 2025.

==== Reliability ====
One of the primary concerns for the LRV4 fleet in San Francisco was improving the mean distance between failures (MDBF) compared to the existing Breda LRV2/3 fleet. The Breda fleet was able to achieve an MDBF of 2,000–5,500 miles (3,200–8,900 km) in fiscal years 2005 and 2006; the contract with Siemens called for a MDBF of 25,000 miles (40,000 km). When they were initially placed in service, the Siemens LRV4 had a MDBF of 5,000 miles (8,000 km), improving to 17,000 miles (27,000 km) by January 2020.

==== Seating ====
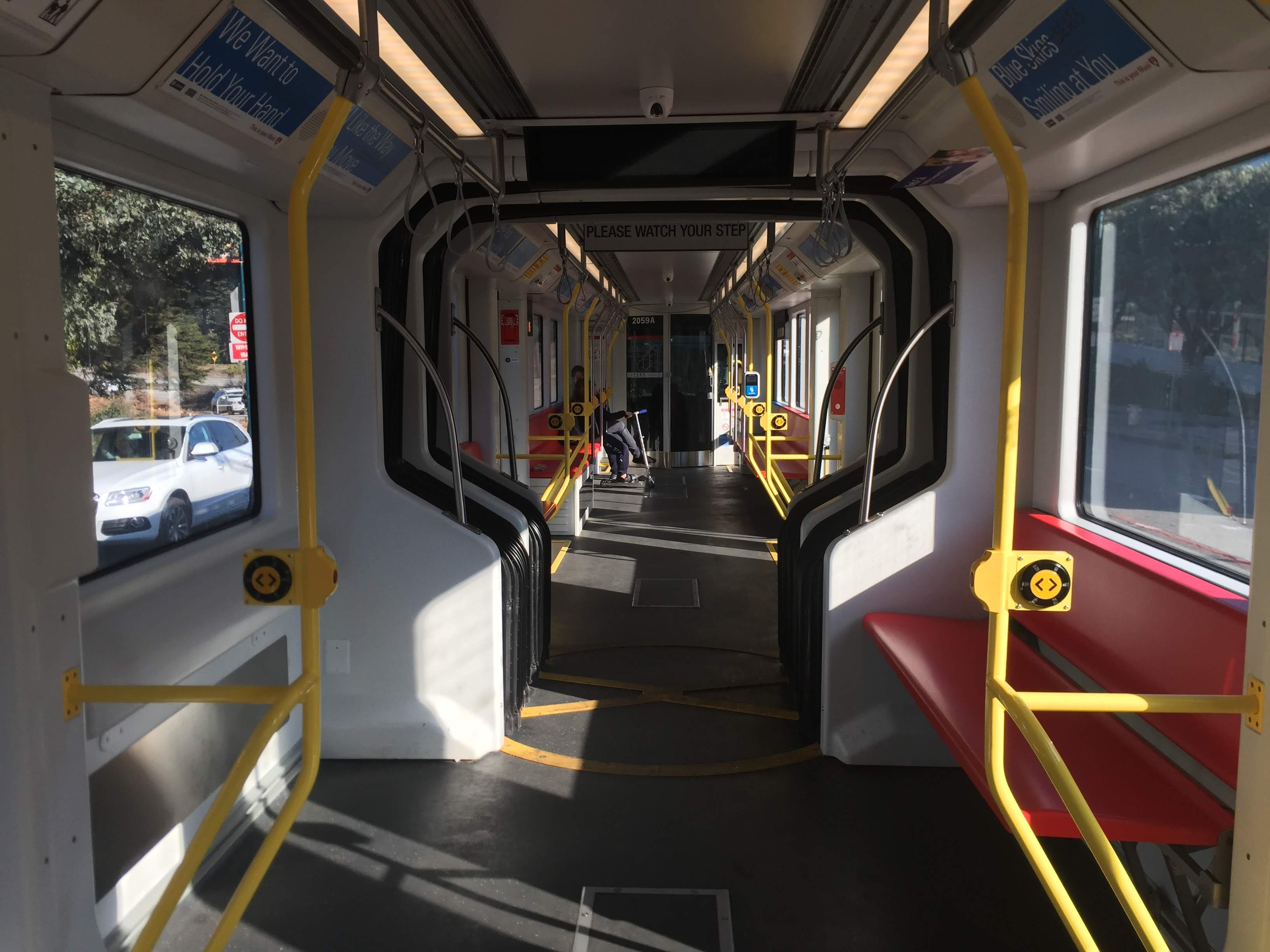
All-longitudinal seating configuration of the first 68 LRV4’s 2001–2068

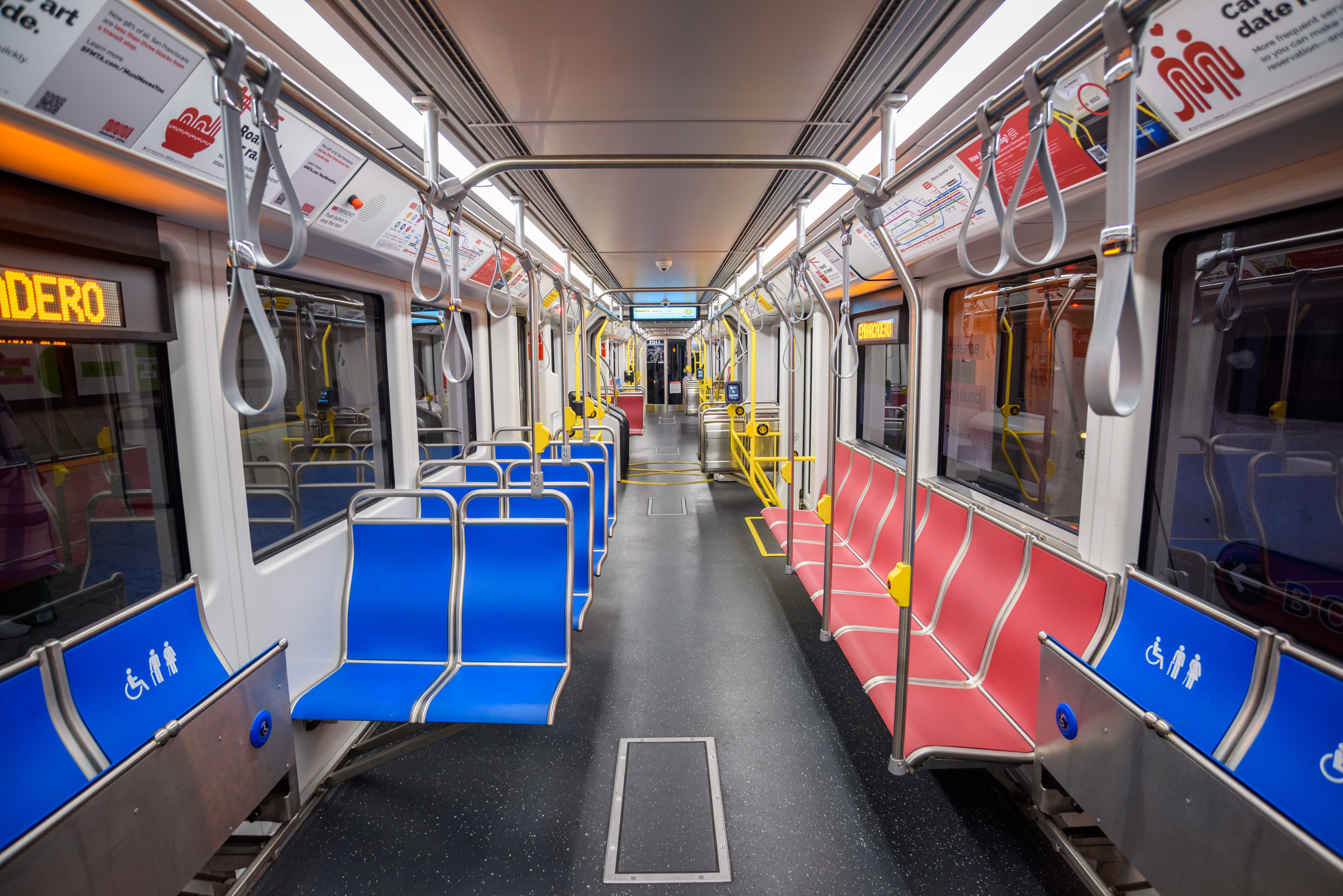
A later seating configuration with partial longitudinal and partial double transverse seating

Ridership surveys and SFMTA staff recommendations resulted in an all-longitudinal seating configuration for the initial "future fleet" delivery of 68 LRVs, where seats are placed along the long sides of the car, rather than lateral seating, where seats face the front and back of the vehicle. The longitudinal seating creates wider aisles, is preferred by disability rights advocates, provides more room for standing passengers, and may accommodate bicycles on board, as the bicycle policy only allows folding bikes on board.

However, in "future fleet" of 68 LRV4s, the long benches were flat and lacked the individual seating pockets used in the Breda longitudinal benches. In a November 2019 report, Muni provided details for a retrofit of the already-delivered "future fleet": half the flat longitudinal benches will be replaced with single transverse seats, and the other half will be replaced with individual longitudinal seats. For the "replacement fleet" of 151 cars, 50 will be delivered with seating to match the retrofitted "future fleet" of 68; the remaining 101 will have double transverse seats instead of the single transverse seats. The seats also will be lowered, enabling riders shorter than 5 ft 4 in (163 cm) to rest their feet on the floor.

=== Cleveland ===
The Greater Cleveland Regional Transit Authority intends to acquire 24 S200 vehicles to replace heavy rail vehicles used on the Red Line, with an option to acquire 36 additional units to replace the light rail vehicles used on the Blue, Green, and Waterfront lines. As of March 2025, 24 of the options had been exercised, for a total of 48 vehicles ordered. In October 2025, six additional vehicles were ordered, bringing the total number of LRVs up to 54. The first car was delivered on August 31, 2026.

GCRTA's S200 vehicles will include steps at the front and back doors for boarding and alighting at street-level light rail stations and stops. These doors will also have manually operated trapdoors for use on the Red Line, which exclusively uses high-level platforms. The introduction of S200 LRVs for the Red Line will require modifications at Red Line stations, as the S200 cars are narrower than the existing Tokyu trains.

The plan was first announced in January 2023, and the deal was finalized in May 2023, after the RTA received a grant from the Federal Transit Administration. The S200s are expected to begin service in Cleveland in 2027.

=== St. Louis ===
In May 2023, Metro Transit of St. Louis announced its intention to acquire 48 vehicles for their MetroLink service to replace its aging fleet of SD-400 light rail vehicles. The S200 vehicles for St. Louis will be equipped with batteries for operation on tracks without overhead lines, allowing for flexibility in future expansions.

In December 2025 the Saint Louis Metro raised the intended number of LRVs being added to the 2027 fleet to 55, with the update that the vehicles were in the design review phase.

== Operational history ==
=== San Francisco ===
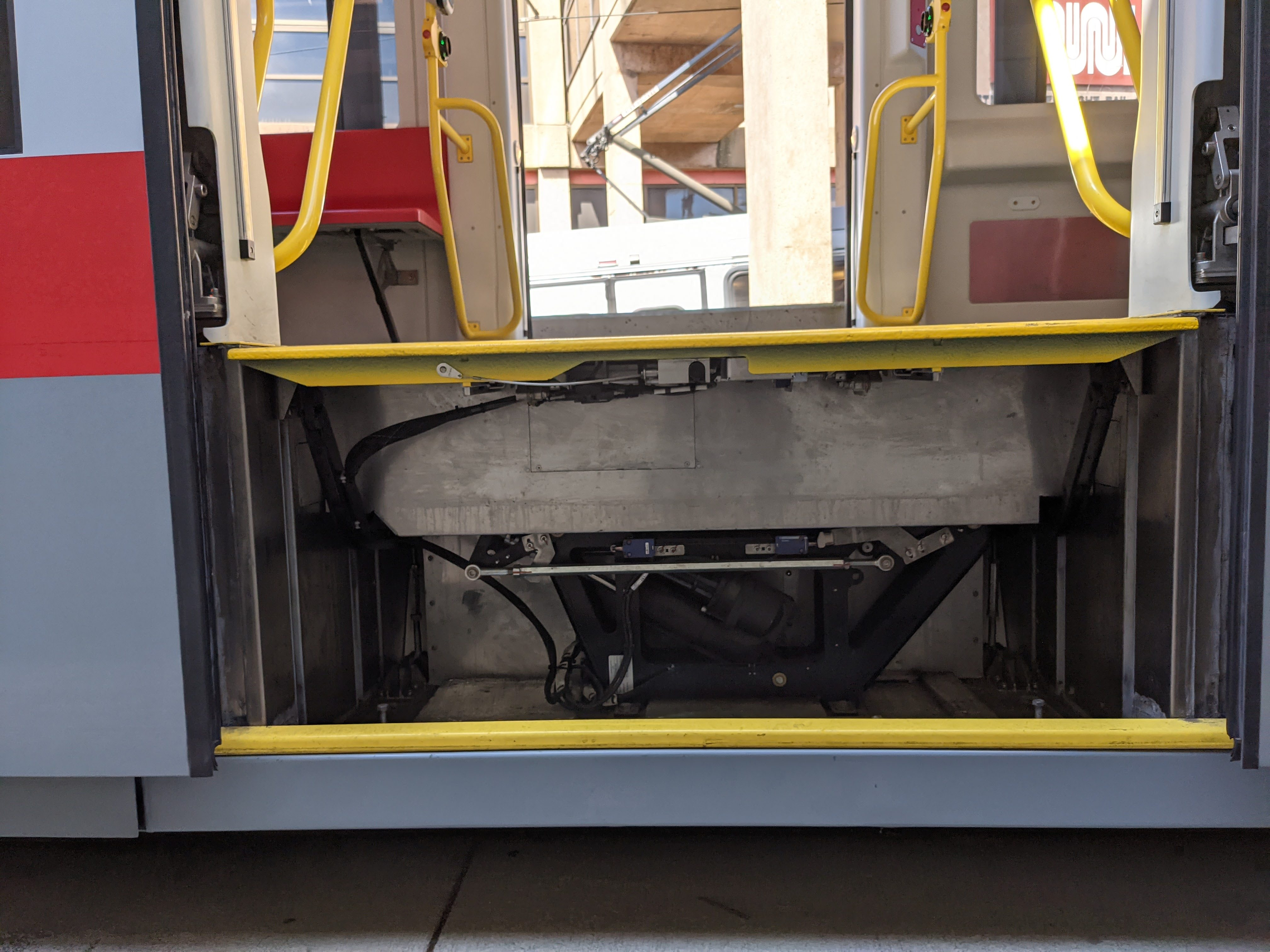
Movable step mechanism in a Muni S200

Multiple defects were reported in April 2019 with San Francisco's fleet of S200 trains, which it refers to as the LRV4. The issues, involving doors, couplers, and brakes, drew widespread media attention. In response, the San Francisco Municipal Transportation Authority delayed a $62 million payment to Siemens. The issues with the LRV4 fleet, combined with the high failure rate of SFMTA's older trains, caused delays and overcrowding on multiple services.

On April 12, 2019, a passenger on the N-Judah line was dragged along a platform after her hand became stuck in a door. The passenger was thrown down to track level after freeing her hand, and was seriously injured. The April 2019 incident was the fourth reported incident where passengers were trapped by doors on the LRV4. As a temporary measure, the rear doors on S200 trains were locked shut to prevent additional trapped passengers. Siemens redesigned the door sensor system under warranty, and normal operation resumed in June 2019.

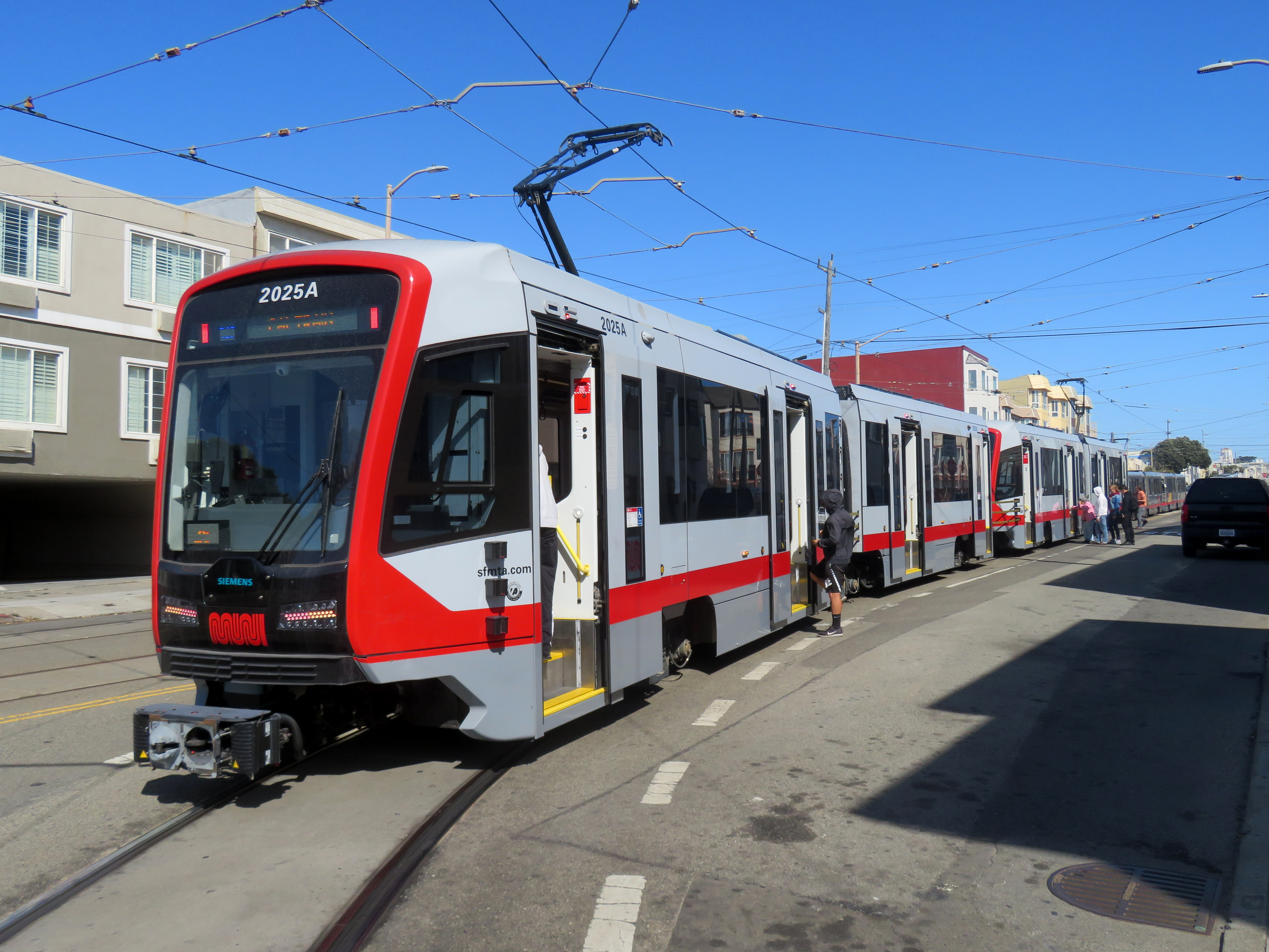
A two-car train in coupled operation on the N Judah line; the coupler is prominent on the front of the lead car (#2025).

In a separate incident on April 12, a two-car train of LRV4 cars was found with a faulty shear pin in its couplers. The S200's coupler shear pins allow the couplers to retract inwards in a collision, working in tandem with an anti-climber on the front of the train, which protects the train operator and passengers. The faulty shear pins put trains at risk of unintentionally separating in service, and Muni responded by running trains with only one car. More extensive inspections in May 2019 showed that approximately 1/3 of the couplers were damaged.

At the Board of Supervisors meeting in April 2019, Muni officials also reported that the wheels on the LRV4s required resurfacing before their expected end-of-life because of the use of emergency brakes, which are engaged once a week on average. At any given time, only half (or fewer) of the LRV4s were available for service because of wheels with flat spots caused by emergency braking.

Muni and the California Public Utilities Commission investigated the issues. The investigation into the coupler issues found that maintenance technicians were overtightening an adjustment screw in the couplers, which placed additional stress on the shear pins, which then failed. Maintenance procedures were revised, and redesigned brackets and spacers were installed in the couplers. Two-car and three-car trains resumed service in June 2019, but were again withdrawn in December 2019 after issues with the shear pins resumed. The later issues with shear pins were attributed to stresses on the couplers brought on by San Francisco's hilly terrain. Siemens provided new shear pins under warranty until it completed a redesign of the system, and the shear pin issues were resolved by the end of 2021.

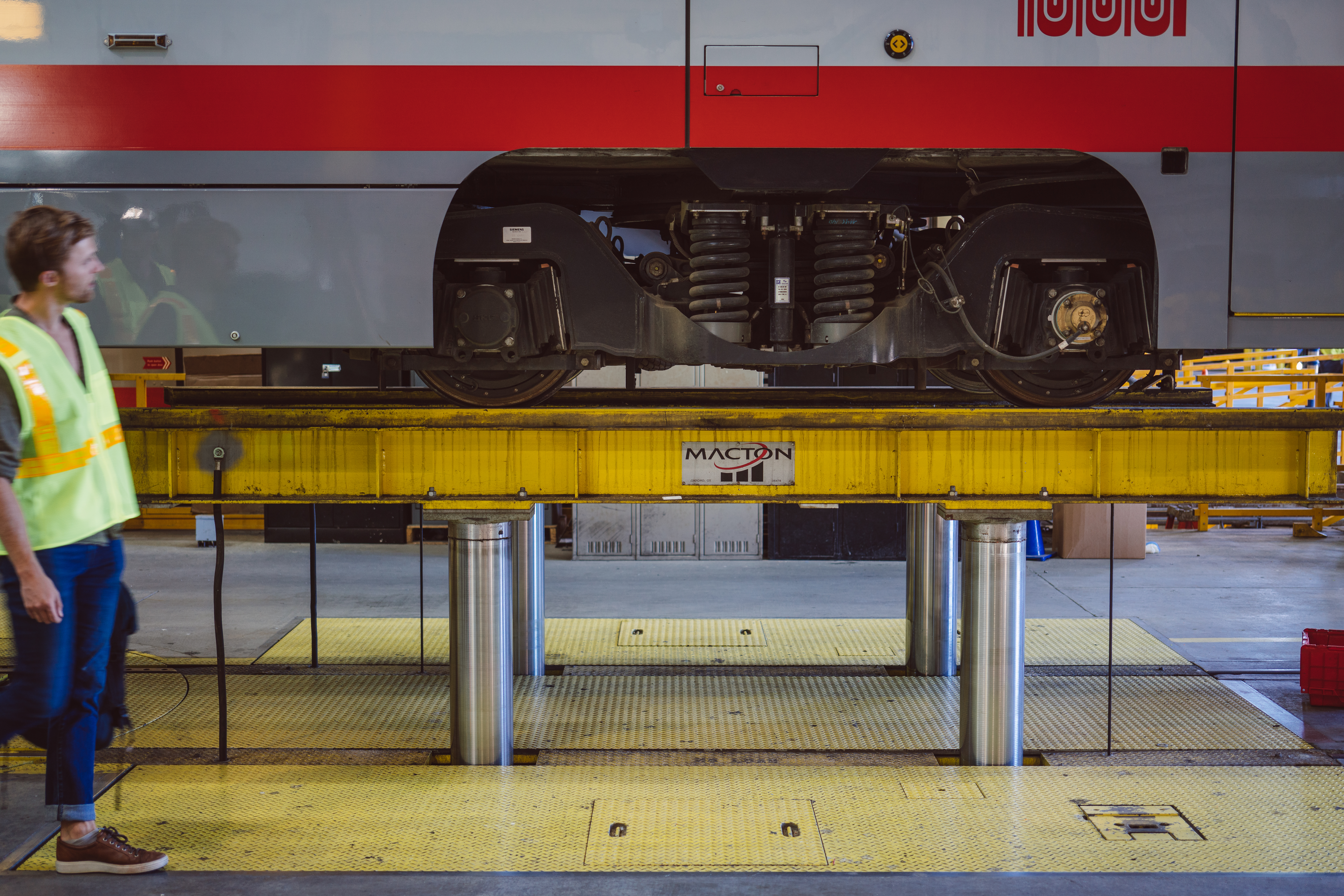
Powered end truck of an LRV4 on a lift at the Muni Metro East yard in July 2019, prior to retrofit with track brakes

The investigation into the wheel issues found faults in the design of the brake system on the S200 LRVs, and also highlighted issues with operator training. Operators were trained to use the emergency stop button on San Francisco's older LRVs when requiring a quick stop, because of the sometimes faulty nature of their braking systems. Emergency braking in the S200 LRVs was found to be effective, but applying the emergency brakes disables anti-lock braking, leading to flat spots on wheels as they grind against the rails. The braking system on the S200 LRVs was redesigned in late 2019 to incorporate additional track brakes, and modifications were completed in 2020.

=== Calgary ===
Calgary Transit's S200 LRVs, which it refers to as the Series 9, experienced minor issues in October 2016. Software glitches in some newly-introduced S200 trains activated a safety mode, which reduced their service speed from 80 to 40 km/h (50 to 25 mph). The trains' doors were too slow to open, also causing delays. The issues were resolved by Siemens staff in Calgary, and the S200 cars continued in service.

In the aftermath of the April 2019 incidents in San Francisco's S200 fleet, Calgary City Council transportation committee chair Shane Keating requested that Calgary Transit review its S200 fleet for similar issues. Calgary Transit officials highlighted their maintenance and inspection procedures, and emphasized that their trains' doors are built to a different specification than in San Francisco's fleet.

== See also ==
- Siemens–Duewag U2
- Siemens SD-100 and SD-160
- Siemens SD-400 and SD-460
- Siemens SD660
- Siemens P2000
- Siemens S700 and S70
