= Siemens–Duewag U2 =

Light rail vehicle

Siemens-Duewag U2
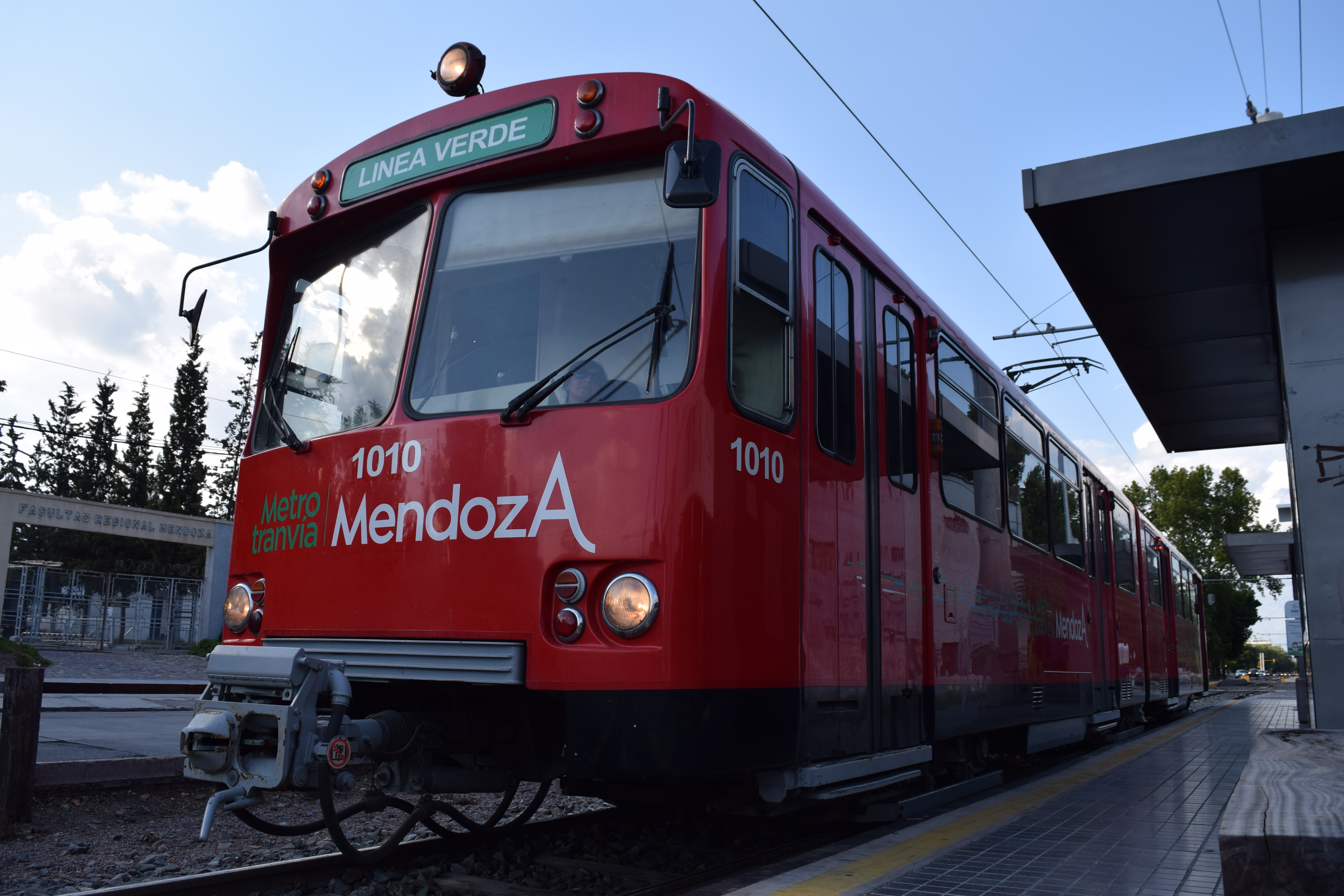
- A Siemens U2 in service in Mendoza

- A diagram of the U2 vehicles
- Manufacturers: Siemens; Duewag
- Built at: Düsseldorf, West Germany (Duewag); Florin, California (Siemens California)
- Constructed: 1968–1990
- Entered service: 1968 (Frankfurt U-Bahn); 1978 (Edmonton LRT); 1981 (Calgary CTrain); 1981 (San Diego MTS); 1987 (Sacramento SacRT); 2012 (Mendoza Línea Verde); TBA (Memphis MATA Trolley)
- Refurbished: 2010, 2013 (Edmonton); 2012 (Mendoza)
- Retired: 2015 (San Diego); 2016 (Frankfurt); 2028 (Calgary); 2029 (Edmonton)
- Number built: 297
- Number in service: 116 (Calgary: 32, Edmonton: 37, Sacramento: 36, Mendoza: 11)
- Number preserved: 11 (US museums: 6, Frankfurt: 3, San Diego: 1)
- Successor: Siemens SD-160, Siemens S70 and S200
- Capacity: 264 people (including standees)
- Operators: Frankfurt U-Bahn (formerly); Metrotranvia Mendoza; Edmonton LRT; CTrain; San Diego Trolley (formerly); SacRT light rail MATA Trolley (future)

Specifications
- Car body construction: Fibreglass (cabs), Steel (body)
- Car length: 24 m (78 ft 8 7/8 in)
- Width: 2,562 mm (8 ft 4 7/8 in)
- Height: 3,780 mm (12 ft 4 7/8 in)
- Doors: 8
- Articulated sections: 1
- Maximum speed: 80 km/h (50 mph)
- Weight: 35,000 kg (77,000 lb)
- Power output: 300 kW (400 hp)
- Electric system: 600-750 V DC OHLE
- Current collection: Pantograph
- UIC classification: Bo’2Bo’
- AAR wheel arrangement: B-2-B
- Braking system: Dynamic Air
- Safety system: CBTC
- Coupling system: Scharfenberg
- Multiple working: up to 5 cars
- Seating: upholstered neoprene foam
- Track gauge: 1,435 mm (4 ft 8 1/2 in) standard gauge

The Siemens–Duewag U2 is a type of light rail vehicle (LRV), built by consortium of Siemens, Duewag and Wegmann & Co built between 1968 and 1990.

The design was based on the prototype U1 tram built in 1965 for the Frankfurt U-Bahn. The U2 was also designed for and used by the Frankfurt U-Bahn. The name is derived from the class identifier given to the cars in the Frankfurt.

The U2 was later exported to North America and adapted for use on light rail systems in Edmonton, Calgary, and San Diego, during a period in which few purpose-built LRVs were being manufactured. The U2 cars were retired from the San Diego Metropolitan Transit System (MTS) and shipped to Argentina. The first batch arrived in early 2011, with full service beginning in October 2012. More than 18 cars were originally sent to Mendoza. While some were used for spare parts, others were refurbished for service. In 2022, San Diego sent additional Siemens SD-100 cars to supplement the fleet. The system acts as a "Green Line" (Línea Verde), running along repurposed, existing rail infrastructure.

== History ==
=== U1 prototype ===
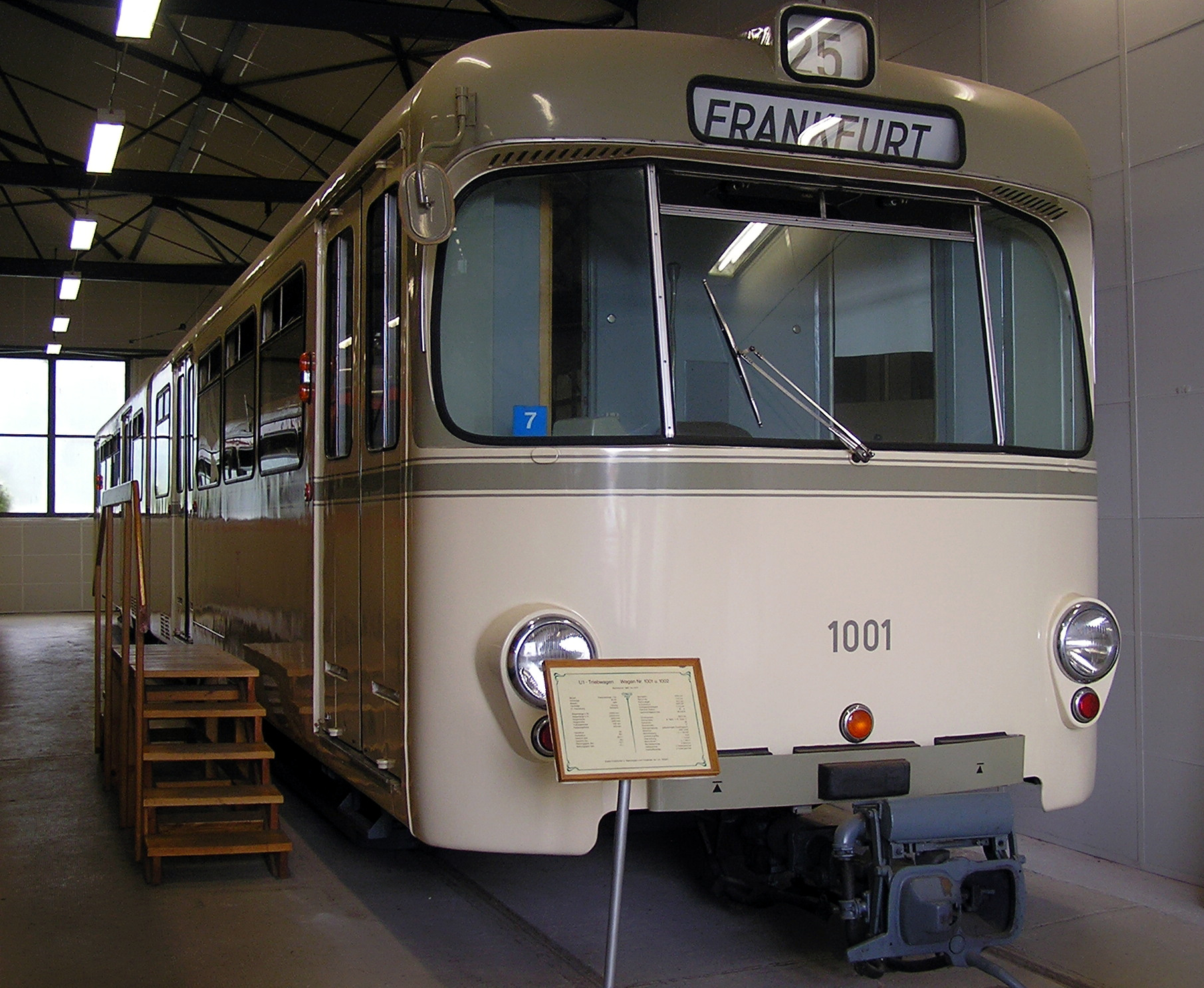
Siemens U1 car 1001 prototype

In the early 1960s, Duewag developed and manufactured a prototype of a new tram for the Frankfurt U-Bahn. The design was largely based on the previously delivered trams, but added electronic controls that allowed several railcars to be coupled together to form trains, and a floor height of 93 cm (37 in) that made it possible to board from platforms with a height of 32 to 56 cm (13 to 22 in) without having to add a folding step previously used. The new car was debuted at the International Transport Exhibition in Munich in 1965 and two vehicles arrived in Frankfurt in May 1966. There was no further production of the U1, and they were only used in regular service for a few years before being retired in 1976 because of their incompatibility with the rest of the fleet.

=== U2 production vehicles ===
With the experience learned from the two prototypes, several changes were made for the production series of cars.

The vehicles were built by consortium of Siemens, Duewag and Wegmann & Co. Duewag was the primary developer and manufacturer, Siemens provided the electrical equipment, and Wegmann did some assembly under contract.

The U2 vehicle was originally developed for the light rail system in Frankfurt. Its design was later used for systems in Edmonton and Calgary. The model was chosen for operations in San Diego in 1979, however, the planned platform level was lower than their counterpart system, so a street-level version was developed, and 71 vehicles were eventually delivered in stages.

=== In Mendoza ===
Between 2011 and 2014 San Diego Metropolitan Transit System exported 18 cars to the Metrotranvia Mendoza system in Argentina. Eleven of the cars were renumbered 1001–1011, nine entering service in 2012, and further two in 2019. The remaining seven cars were used as spare parts donors and were scrapped in 2022.

=== Refurbishment ===
Edmonton Transit Service refurbished all 37 of its U2s to extend their operational life by another 10 years. Upgrades included overhauls to the mechanical and electrical systems, the addition of new LED interior and exterior destination signs, additional speakers to improve sound volume, and retrofits for CBTC operation for the Metro Line. Refurbishment was done by Bombardier Transportation in Buffalo, New York.

=== Retirement ===
In 2010, the San Diego Metropolitan Transit System sold 35 cars to Mendoza, Argentina, followed by the bulk of its U2 fleet retiring in 2013, when the Orange Line received low-floor cars. The remainder were used on its initial operating segment until January 2015. In 2016, two cars were shipped to Texas for use at a dog training facility. The majority of the U2's had left the property by 2018, having been either scrapped or donated to museums, with car 1001 being retained.

After 48 years of service, the last Frankfurt examples were retired in April 2016. The Frankfurt cars have been replaced by Bombardier Flexity Swifts, there are three cars left for museum purposes.

Calgary Transit has begun a similar retirement system as they have begun to introduce the Siemens S200 as both a replacement and expansion of the fleet. The city has begun to explore additional disposition options. The U2s in Calgary had been retired in 2016 but there are still 32 in service out of 83 DCs and 2 ACs.

In 2022, Edmonton Transit Service announced that its 37 U2s will be replaced by 2030, as they intend to procure new LRV's in the next eight to ten years.

On February 6, 2026, the City of Edmonton awarded Hyundai Rotem a contract for 32 high-floor light rail vehicles to replace the fleet of U2s, with deliveries from 2029 to 2030.

== Technical details ==
The U2's dimensions are 24.284 m (79 ft 8 1/8 in) by 2.650 m (8 ft 8 3/8 in) by 3.66 m (12 ft 1/8 in). In the US and Canada, usually up to five U2 cars are coupled to run as a train. Calgary Transit regularly couples up six U2 cars to shuttle them from Anderson Garage to Haysboro storage. These unique shuttle trains can be commonly seen after the evening rush hour. Each articulated car has a total passenger capacity of 264 passengers. It may be equipped with two DC motors for a total power output of 300 kW (400 hp) and a maximum speed of 80 km/h (50 mph), or with four AC motors for an output of 544 kW (730 hp) and speed of 88 km/h (55 mph).

As the length of a tram or light-rail train running on shared track is restricted to a maximum of 105 meters (344 ft) in Germany, up to four U2 cars may be used in a single consist on such track.

Frankfurt U2 cars use Scheren (diamond) or single-arm (z-shaped) pantographs, while Calgary, Edmonton and San Diego vehicles use the latter style pantograph exclusively.

In order to operate safely, the cars require 500 kW (670 hp) to accelerate from a station, and 150 kW (200 hp) to maintain speed.

== Variants ==
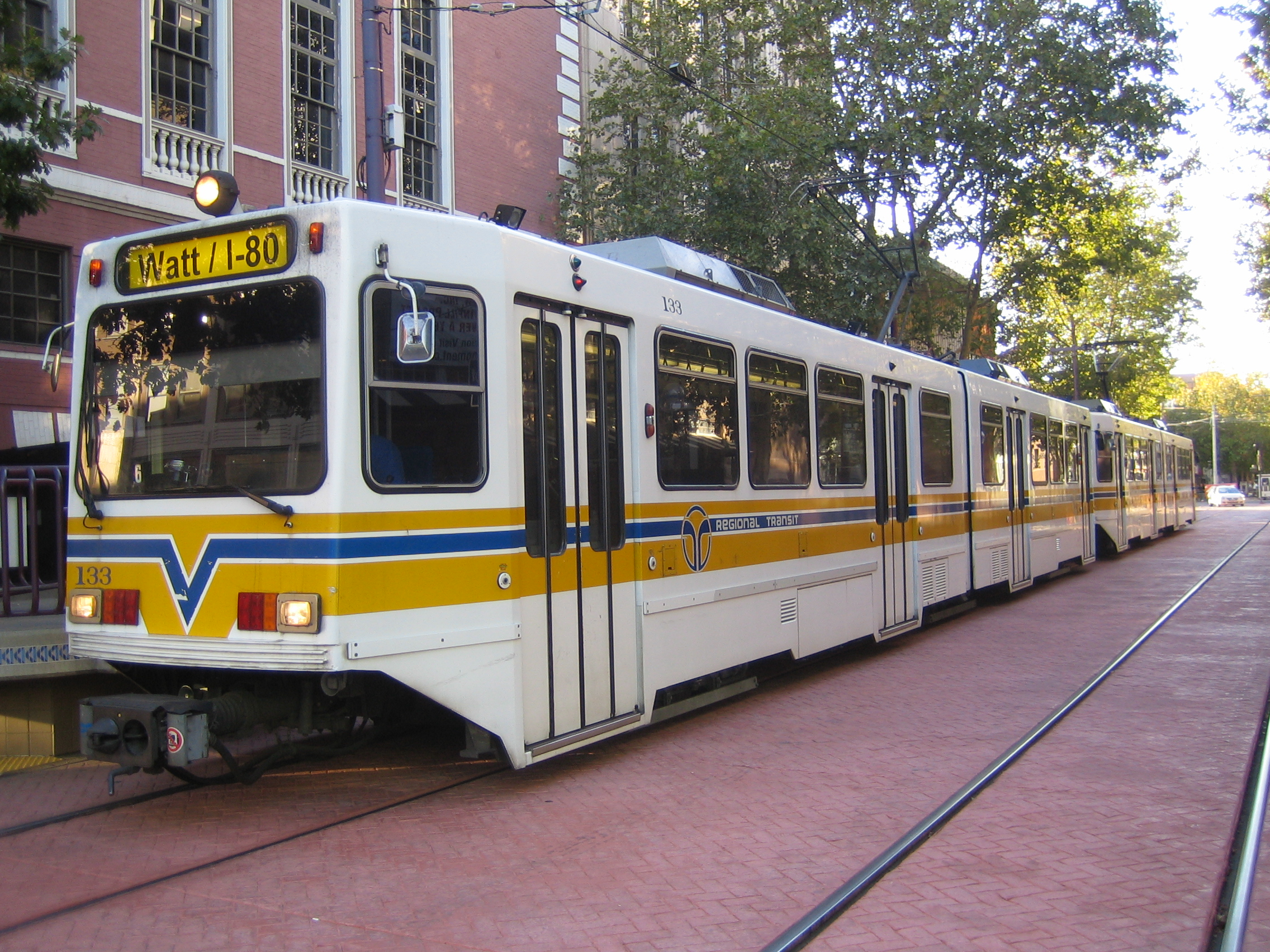
Siemens-Duewag U2a

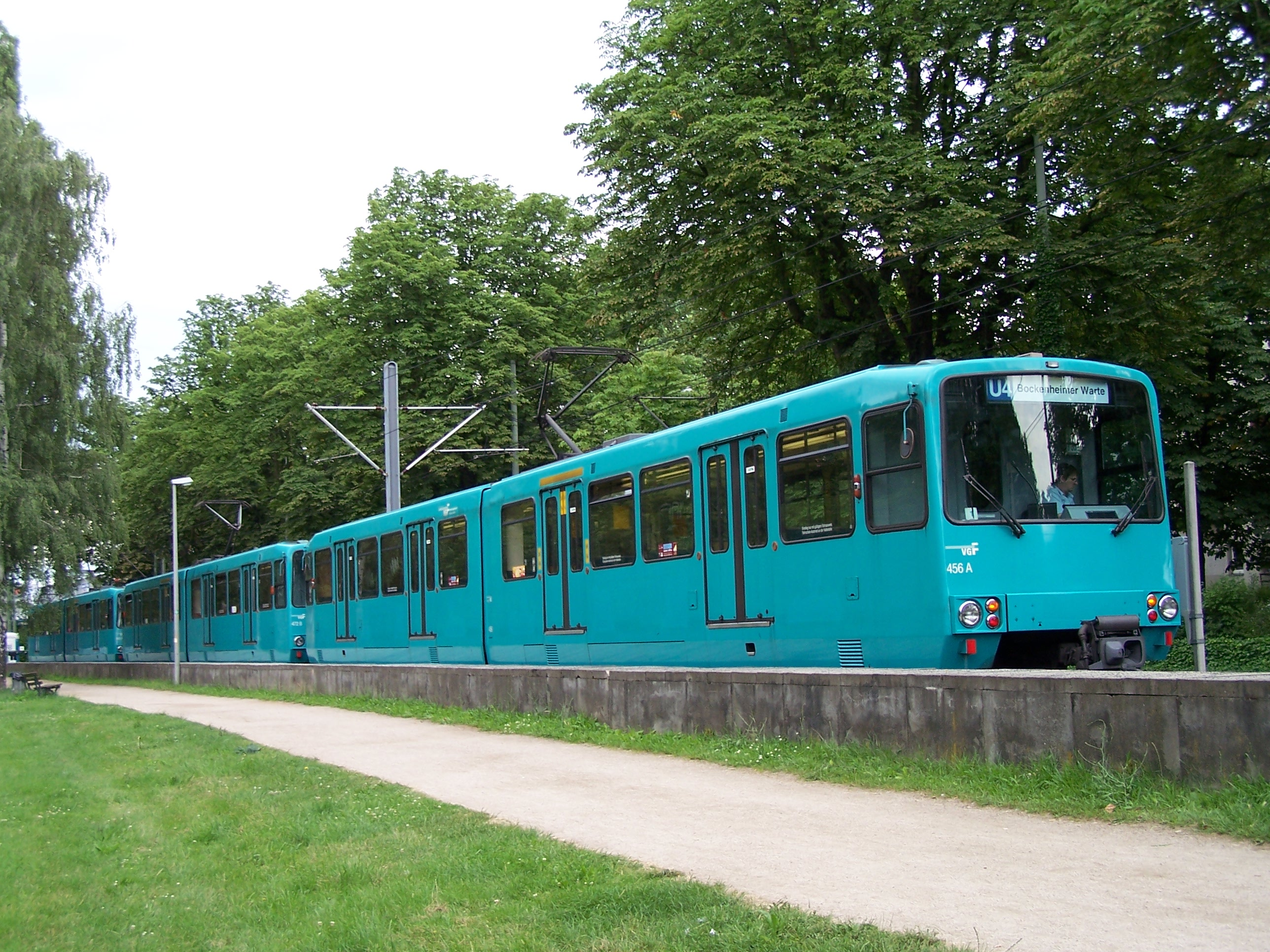
Siemens-Duewag U3

Siemens-Duewag Type U3 is an upgraded version of the U2 with a slightly longer length and cosmetic changes. Introduced in 1977, they entered service in 1980 and will be exported to Monterrey in Mexico, after being retired from service by Germany's Frankfurt U-Bahn. Three examples will be preserved for museum service

Siemens-Duewag Type U2a on Sacramento Regional Transit's light rail system is an upgraded version of the U2 that shares similar characteristics of the newer SD-100s and SD-160s, yet it still uses the mechanical equipment of the U2.

Siemens also developed a U2 running on alternating current motors using inverters (nicknamed the U2-AC). 2 units were purchased by the Government of Alberta in 1988 and operated as demo units for Edmonton and Calgary. Calgary ended up adding the two units to their main fleet until 2015, when both were retired due to part issues. One of the units is still active as a track inspection vehicle, while the other was scrapped for spare parts.

Two variants, designated U2h and U2e, were locally created during the early 2000s in Frankfurt to serve different platform heights on the network. Originally the trains were designed to serve platforms of 32 and 56 cm (13 and 22 in) height, with one large step at each door. As platforms were rebuilt to create a unified standard height of 80 cm (31 in), modifications were required to the fleet: U2h retained a small step to serve 56 and 80 cm (22 and 31 in) platforms on lines U1 to U3, while U2e lost the step entirely to serve 87 cm (34 in) and later 80 cm (31 in) platforms on lines U4, U6 and U7.

== U2 cars acquired, by city ==
- Calgary (CTrain) — 85 cars (83 U2-DC, and 2 U2-AC acquired from Edmonton)
- Edmonton (Edmonton LRT) — 37 cars, 2 U2-AC cars operated as demonstrators between 1988 and 1990, plus 3 parts cars acquired from Calgary.
  - Retrofitted to have electronic LED destination signs on the exterior and interior among other changes, including introducing moving block communications-based train control systems installed by Thales which allow the trains to run in a fully automated mode
- Frankfurt (Frankfurt U-Bahn) — 104 cars; U2 cars completely retired from service as of 2016.
- San Diego (San Diego Trolley) — 71 cars; U2 cars completely retired from service on January 26, 2015
- Mendoza (Metrotranvía Mendoza) — 18 cars (purchased used from San Diego)
- Memphis (MATA Trolley) — 8 cars (purchased used from San Diego)

=== U2a cars acquired, by city ===
- Sacramento (SacRT light rail) - 26 cars

== Preservation ==
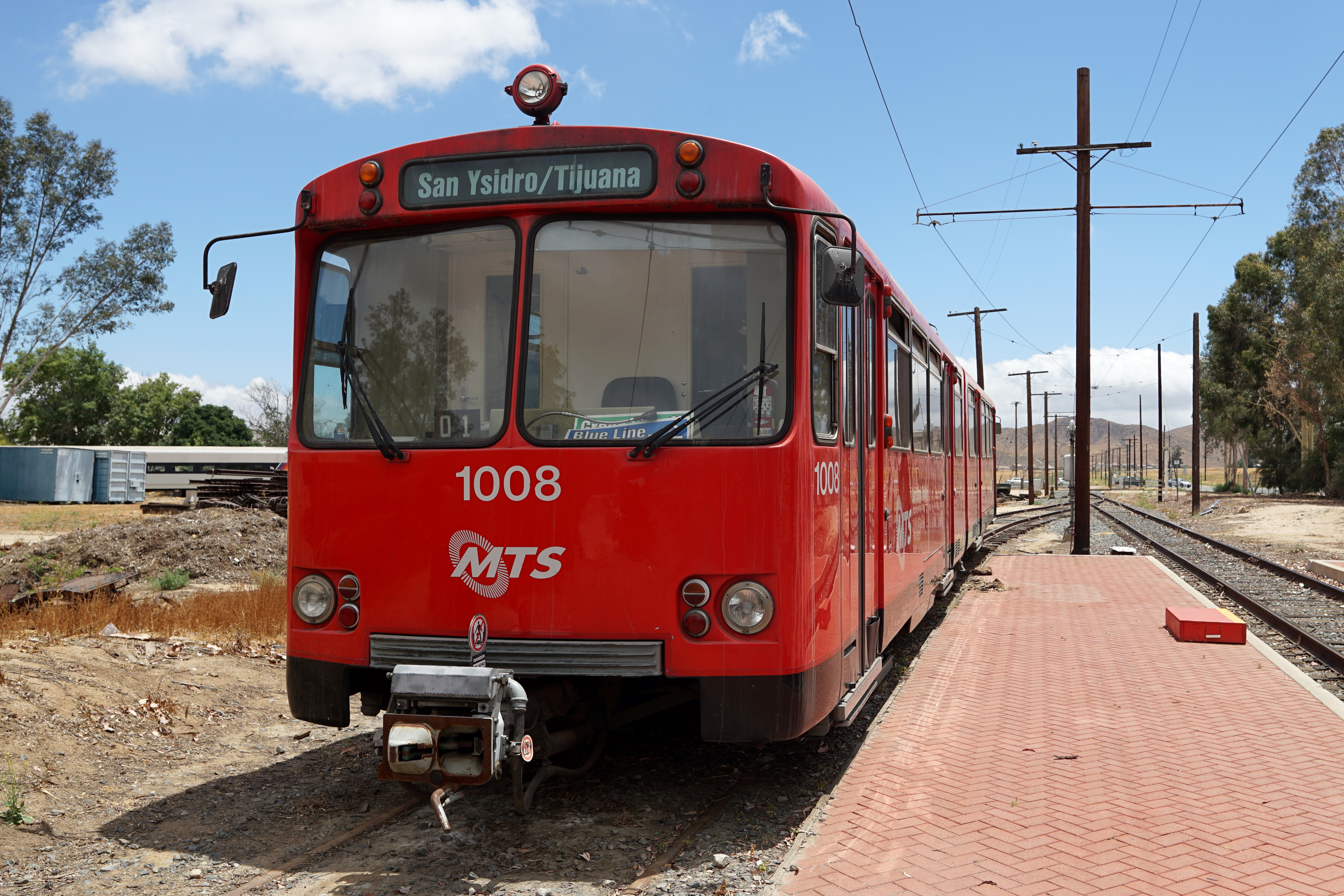
Car 1008 of the San Diego trolley system is preserved at the Southern California Railway Museum

San Diego MTS retired their last U2 vehicles in January 2015, coinciding with low floor S70 cars being deployed on its Blue Line, six examples are preserved by various museums and nonprofits.

- San Diego Electric Railway Association (SDERA) - Car 1002, now on display in National City
- Southern California Railway Museum - Cars 1003 and 1008, operate regularly on the Museum system, independently and as a two-car train.
- Western Railway Museum - Cars 1017 and 1018, operate on museum excursions
- Rockhill Trolley Museum - Car 1019 operates regularly on the Museum system.

MTS has retained Car 1001 as part of its heritage fleet of light rail vehicles. The car was unveiled as part of a celebration at 12th & Imperial on July 11, 2019, and re-entered service two days later. The car operates on the Silver Line, alongside San Diego PCC cars 529 and 530.

The City of Edmonton has stated that at least one U2 will be preserved and operational for their historical fleet. The City of Calgary is currently looking into putting one on static display.

Cars 303-305 of the Frankfurt system have also been preserved following retirement in 2016.

== Gallery ==
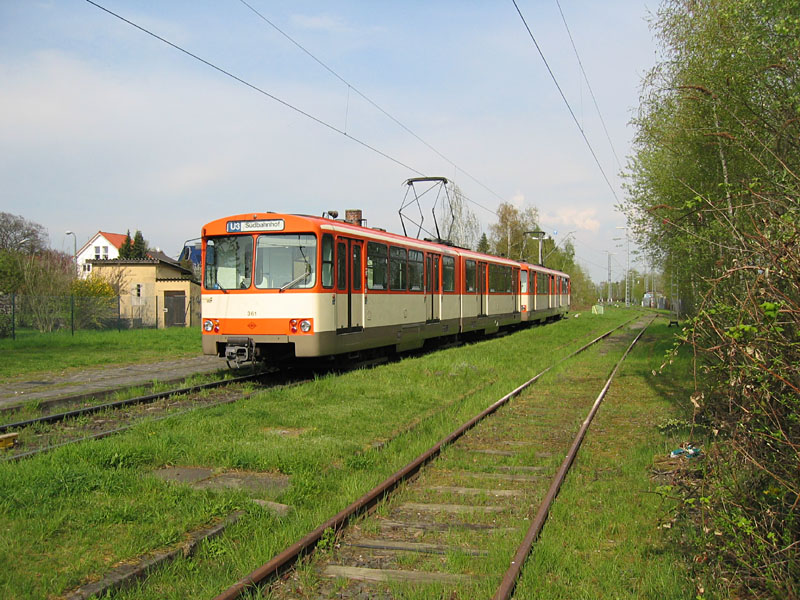
U-Bahn Frankfurt U2 car 361. The U2 cars originate on the Frankfurt network.

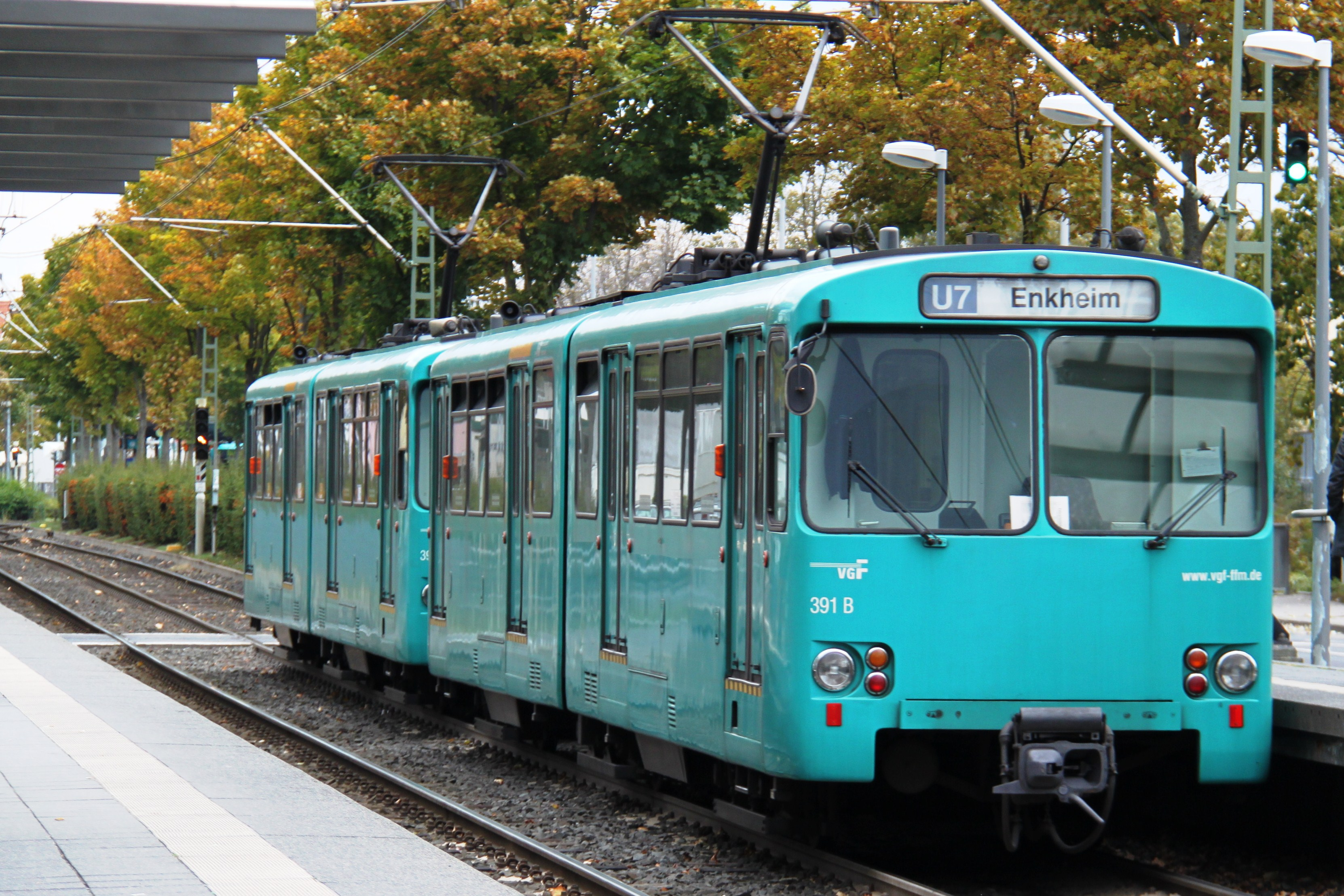
Frankfurt U-Bahn U2e in Frankfurt am Main

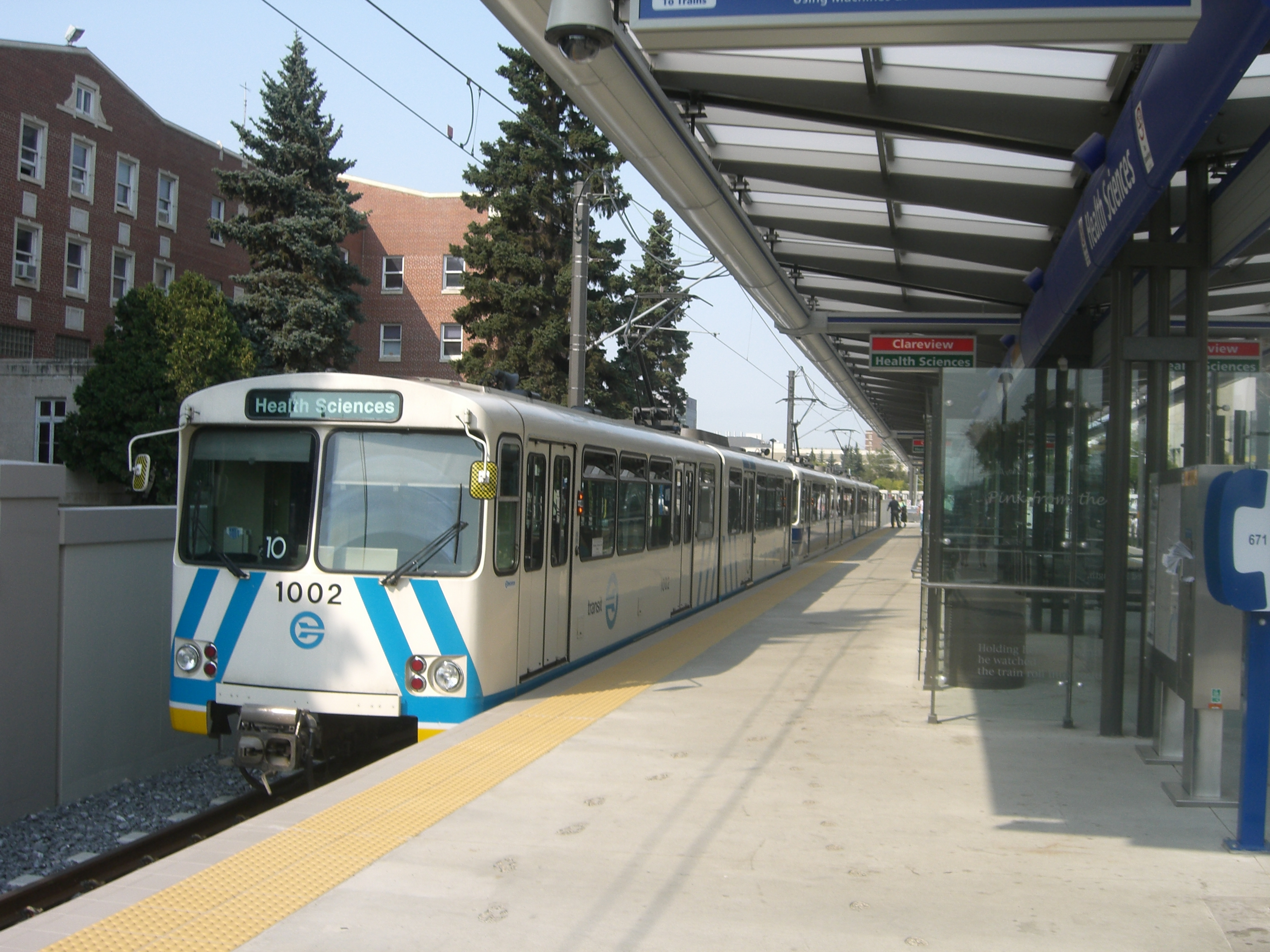
Edmonton U2 car 1002 (Before retrofit)

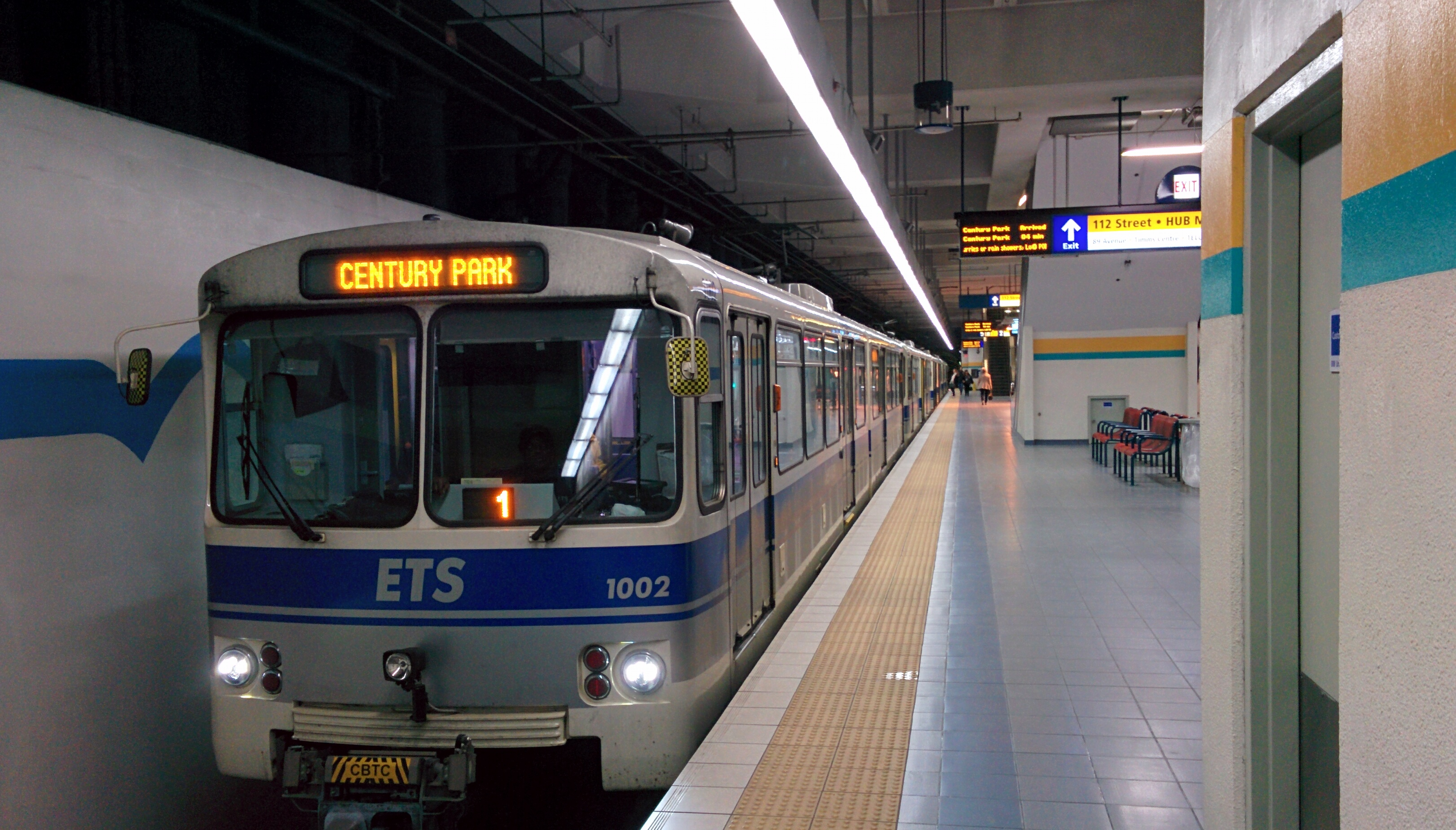
Edmonton U2 car 1002 (After retrofit, with electronic LED destination signs and new paint)

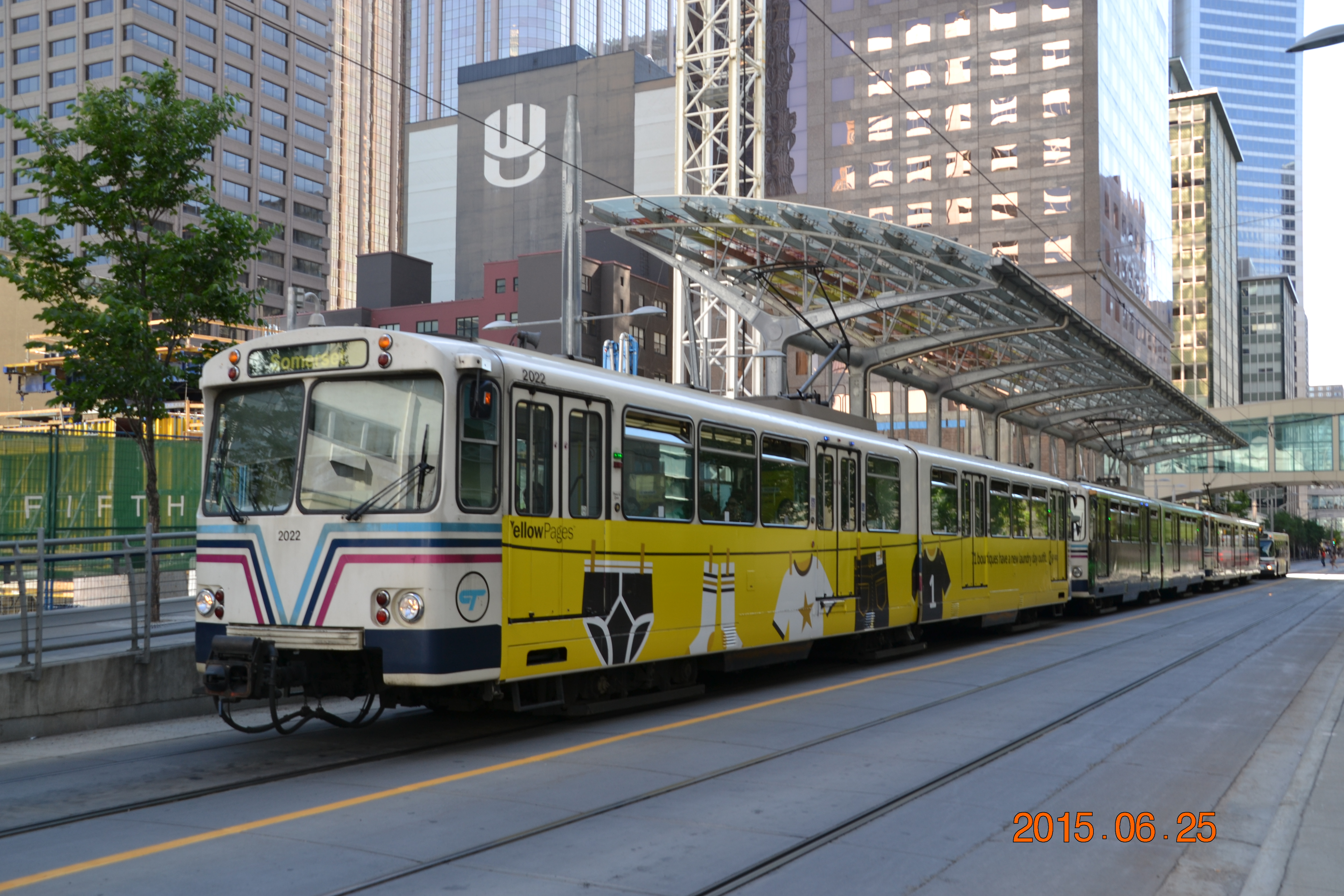
Calgary Transit CTrain U2 car 2022

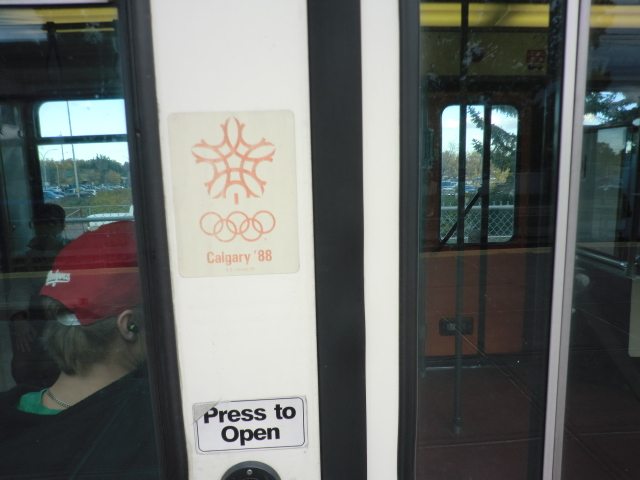
Calgary Transit CTrain U2 Duewag door emblazoned with logo of the 1988 Winter Olympics.

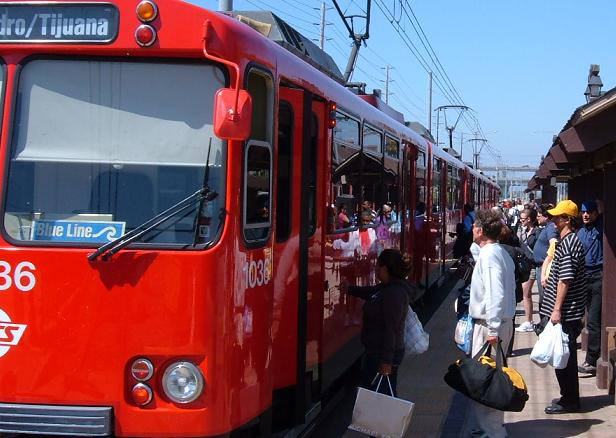
San Diego Trolley U2 car 1036 operating on the Blue Line, at the Old Town Transit Center

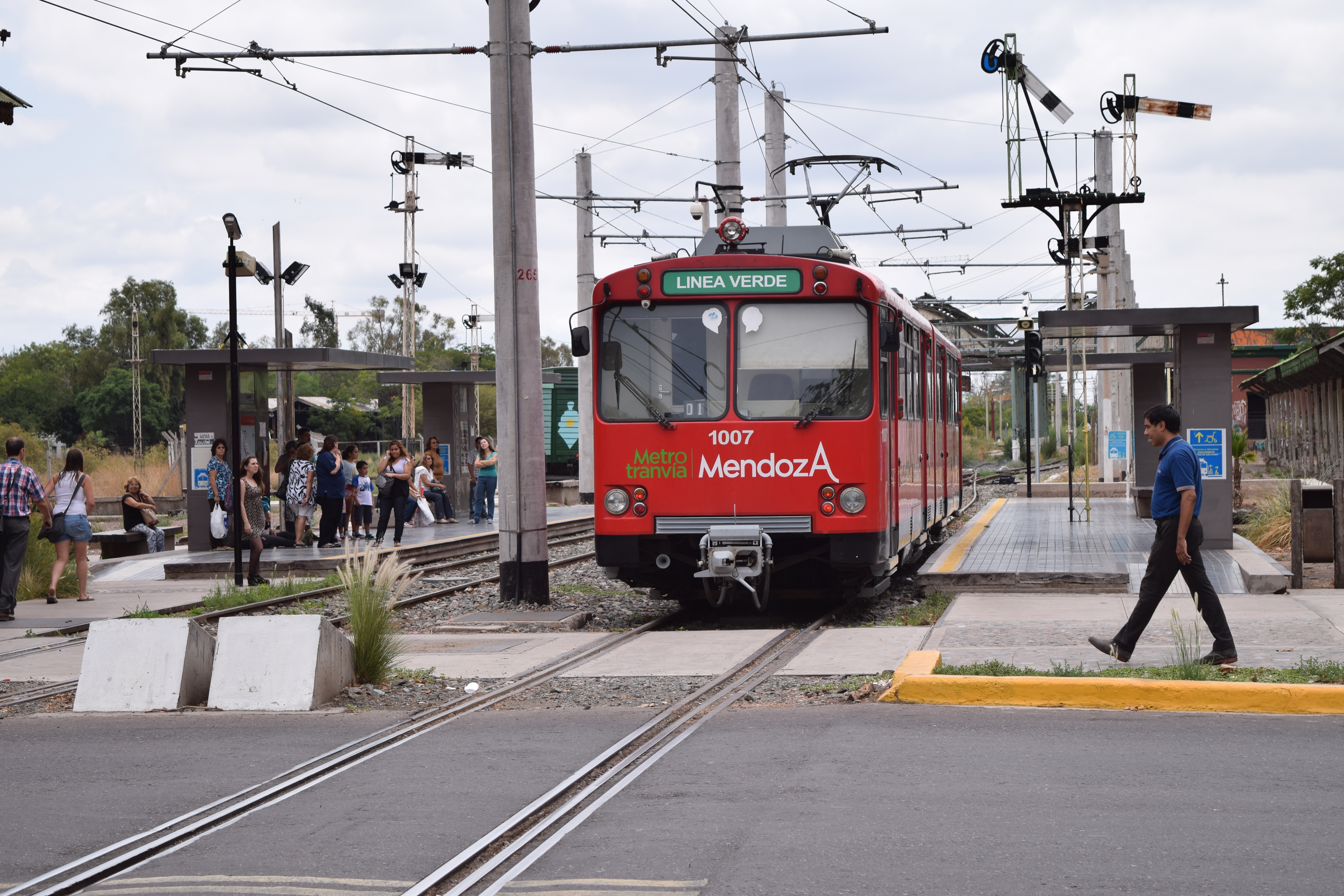
Metrotranvía Mendoza U2 car 1007 in Mendoza, Argentina

== See also ==
Other Siemens light rail vehicles for the American market:

- SD-100 and SD-160 – high-floor LRV for either level boarding at high-platform stations or steps for passenger loading at street level
- SD-400 and SD-460 – high-floor LRV for both level boarding at high-platform stations and with steps for passenger loading at street level
- SD660 – low-floor LRV for passenger loading at street level, custom built for Portland, Oregon
- P2000 – high-floor LRV for level boarding at high-platform stations, custom built for Los Angeles
- S700 and S70 – low-floor LRV for passenger loading at street level
- S200 – high-floor LRV for level boarding at high-platform stations

== See also ==
- CTrain
- Edmonton LRT
- Frankfurt U-Bahn
- San Diego Trolley
