= 1984 San Diego mayoral election =

- November 6, 1984
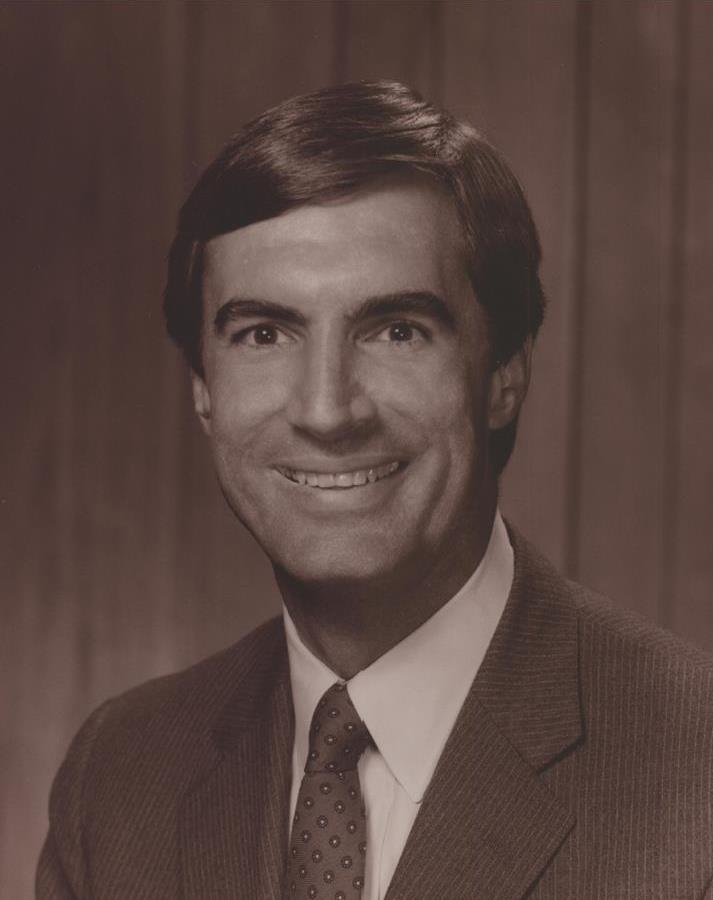

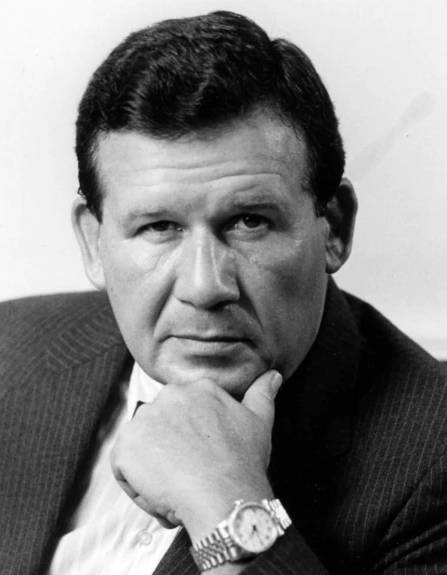
Nominee	Roger Hedgecock	Dick Carlson
Party	Republican	Republican
Popular vote	205,990	149,939
Percentage	57.9%	42.1%
Mayor before election
Roger Hedgecock
Republican
Elected mayor
Roger Hedgecock
Republican

The 1984 San Diego mayoral election was held on November 6, 1984, to elect the mayor for San Diego. Incumbent mayor Roger Hedgecock stood for reelection.

Municipal elections in California are officially non-partisan, though some candidates do receive funding and support from various political parties. The non-partisan primary was held June 5, 1984. Roger Hedgecock and Dick Carlson received the most votes and advanced to the November runoff. Hedgecock was reelected with a majority of the votes in the November election.

== Candidates ==
- Roger Hedgecock, mayor of San Diego
- Dick Carlson, former news anchorman and savings-and-loan executive
- Nancy Bradshaw, self-employed law clerk
- Rich Riel, property manager
- Warren Nielsen, businessman
- Don Parker, businessman
- Robertson Whittemore, real estate attorney
- Rose Lynne, retired teacher and perennial candidate
- James Wyrick, artist

== Campaign ==
Incumbent mayor Roger Hedgecock stood for reelection for his first full term, having previously been elected to finish Pete Wilson's third term. Maureen O'Connor, who had previously come in second to Hedgecock in the 1983 mayoral election, declined to run. Dick Carlson, a former anchorman and savings-and-loans executive, was considered Hedgecock's main challenger.

A major issue during the campaign were allegations that Hedgecock's 1983 mayoral campaign benefited from $357,000 in illegal contributions. Carlson, on the other hand, was criticized for being inexperienced in government and for going back on a promises not to use his personal fortune in the campaign.

On June 5, 1984, Hedgecock came in first in the primary with 47.0 percent of the vote, followed by Carlson with 37.7 percent of the vote. The remaining 15.3 percent of the primary vote was scattered among seven minor candidates, none of whom received more than 5 percent individually. Local newspapers interpreted the relatively high vote for the minor candidates as protest votes and an indication that the electorate was dissatisfied with both Hedgecock and Carlson.

Because Hedgecock was short of an overall majority of the vote, he and Carlson advanced to a runoff election scheduled for November 6, 1984. Hedgecock ultimately prevailed in the general election with 57.9 percent of the vote, and was reelected as mayor.

== Primary election results ==
San Diego mayoral primary election, 1984
Party	Candidate	Votes	%
Republican	Roger Hedgecock (incumbent)	95,097	47.0
Republican	Dick Carlson	76,296	37.7
Nonpartisan	Nancy Bradshaw	9,394	4.6
Nonpartisan	Rich Riel	6,584	3.3
Nonpartisan	Warren Nielsen	4,345	2.2
Nonpartisan	Don Parker	4,237	2.1
Nonpartisan	Robertson Whittemore	3,061	1.5
Nonpartisan	Rose Lynne	2,332	1.2
National Democratic Policy Committee	James Wyrick	1,103	0.5
Total votes		202,449	100

== General election results ==
San Diego mayoral general election, 1984
Party	Candidate	Votes	%
Republican	Roger Hedgecock (incumbent)	205,990	57.9
Republican	Dick Carlson	149,939	42.1
Total votes		355,929	100
