= 1986 San Diego mayoral special election =

- June 3, 1986
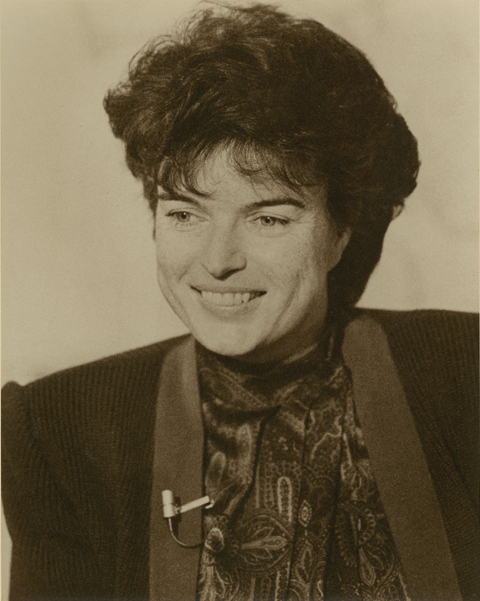

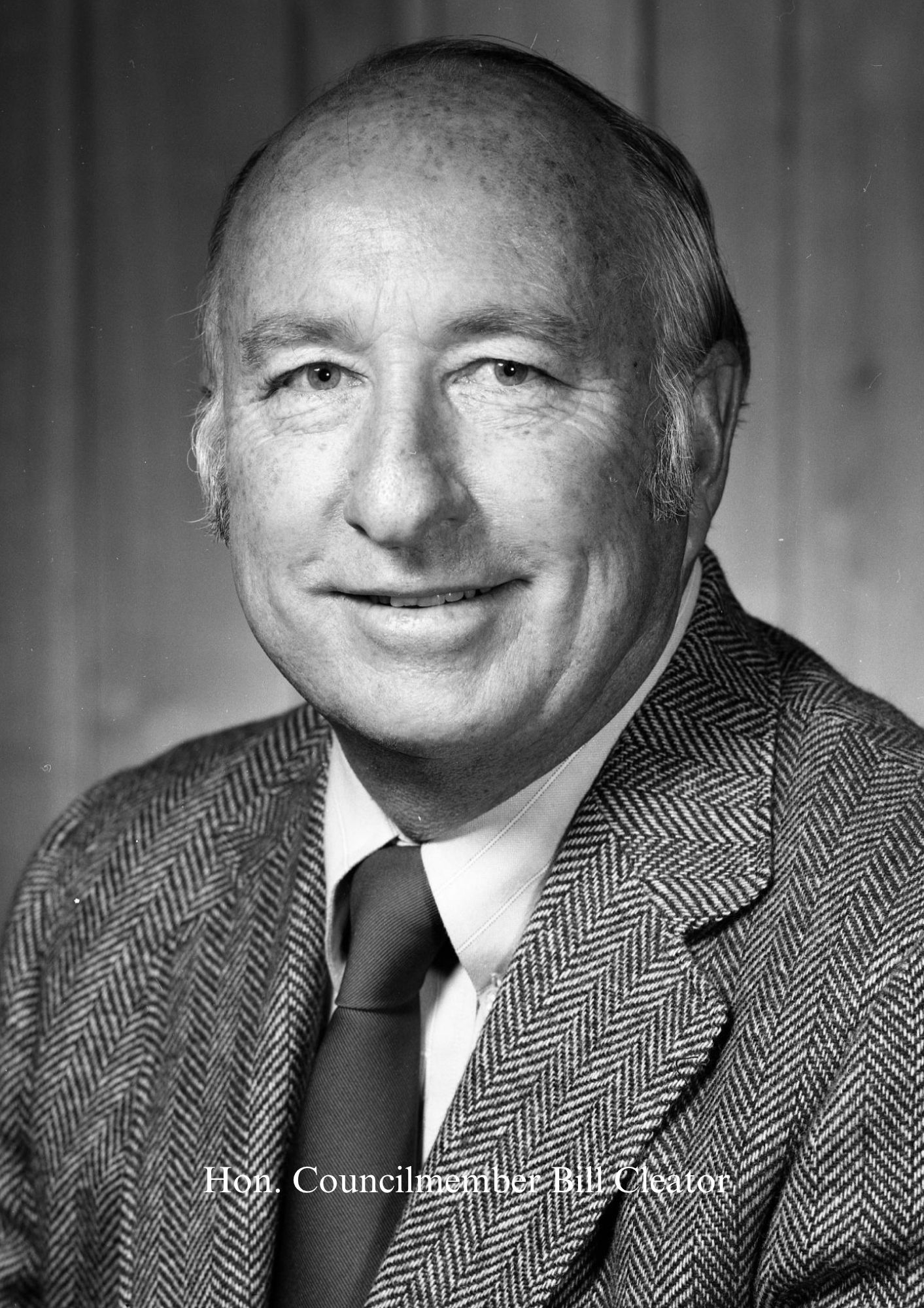
Nominee	Maureen O'Connor	Bill Cleator
Party	Democratic	Republican
Popular vote	112,308	90,811
Percentage	55.3%	44.7%
Mayor before election
Ed Struiksma (acting)
Republican
Elected mayor
Maureen O'Connor
Democratic

The 1986 San Diego mayoral special election was held on June 3, 1986, to elect the mayor for San Diego. The special election was necessary due to the resignation of former Mayor Roger Hedgecock.

Municipal elections in California are officially non-partisan, though some candidates do receive funding and support from various political parties. The non-partisan special primary was held Tuesday, February 25, 1986. Former San Diego City Council member Maureen O'Connor and current council member Bill Cleator received the most votes and advanced to the June runoff. O'Connor was elected mayor with a majority of the votes in the June runoff.

== Roger Hedgecock resignation ==
On December 10, 1985, Roger Hedgecock resigned as mayor of San Diego after losing an attempt to overturn a felony conviction on one count of conspiracy and 12 counts of perjury. Deputy Mayor Ed Struiksma assumed the role of acting mayor until a special election could be held to fill the vacancy.

== Candidates ==
- Maureen O'Connor, former member of the San Diego City Council and mayoral candidate in 1983
- Bill Cleator, member of the San Diego City Council and mayoral candidate in 1983
- Floyd Morrow, former member of the San Diego City Council
- Ed Struiksma, member of the San Diego City Council and acting mayor
- Mary Christian-Heising, political scientist
- Loch David Crane, magician, college instructor, and perennial candidate
- Robert McCullough, environmental developer
- Raymond Peters, former owner of New World Airways
- John Kelley, semi-retired public relations man, and perennial candidate
- Warren Nielsen, construction company owner
- Vernon Watts Jr., unemployed
- Nicholas Walpert, part-time pilot
- Rose Lynne, retired teacher and perennial candidate
- Arthur Helliwell, veteran

== Campaign ==
The special election to replace Hedgecock attracted a crowded field of candidates. The three candidates considered front-runners were San Diego City Council member Bill Cleator, a Republican, and former council members Maureen O'Connor and Floyd Morrow, both Democrats. Acting mayor Ed Struiksma initially filed to run for election, but dropped out of the race after learning that he would be subject of a criminal investigation related to allegedly fabricated expense accounts.

In the primary election held February 25, 1986, O'Connor placed first with 45.9 percent of the vote followed by Cleator with 30.1 percent. Morrow finished in third with 19.1 percent of the vote. Struiksma, whose name remained on the ballot despite dropping out, received 1.6 percent of the vote. The remaining votes were distributed between 12 other candidates, none of whom received more than one percent of the vote. As the top two vote-getters, O'Connor and Cleator advanced to the June runoff. O'Connor was then elected mayor with 55.3 percent of the vote on June 3, 1986.

== Primary election results ==
San Diego mayoral special election, 1986
Party	Candidate	Votes	%
Democratic	Maureen O'Connor	112,308	45.9
Republican	Bill Cleator	53,239	30.1
Democratic	Floyd Morrow	33,743	19.1
Republican	Ed Struiksma	2,862	1.6
Democratic	Mary Christian-Heising	988	0.6
Nonpartisan	Loch David Crane	860	0.5
Nonpartisan	Robert McCullough	851	0.5
Nonpartisan	Raymond Peters	806	0.5
Nonpartisan	John Kelley	672	0.4
Nonpartisan	Warren Nielsen	572	0.3
Nonpartisan	Vernon Watts, Jr.	338	0.2
Nonpartisan	Nicholas Walpert	247	0.1
Nonpartisan	Rose Lynne	213	0.1
Nonpartisan	Arthur Helliwell	189	0.1
Nonpartisan	Gladwin Salway (write-in)	18	–
Nonpartisan	Armand Benjamin, Jr. (write-in)	6	–
Total votes		176,869	100.0

== Runoff election results ==
San Diego mayoral special runoff election, 1986
Party	Candidate	Votes	%
Democratic	Maureen O'Connor	112,308	55.3
Republican	Bill Cleator	90,811	44.7
Nonpartisan	Merrill Cohen (write-in)	28	–
Nonpartisan	Robert McCullough (write-in)	24	–
Total votes		203,171	100.0
