= 1988 San Diego mayoral election =

- June 7, 1988
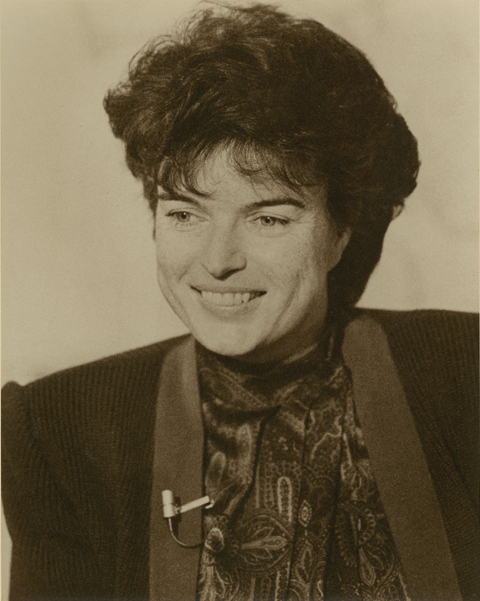

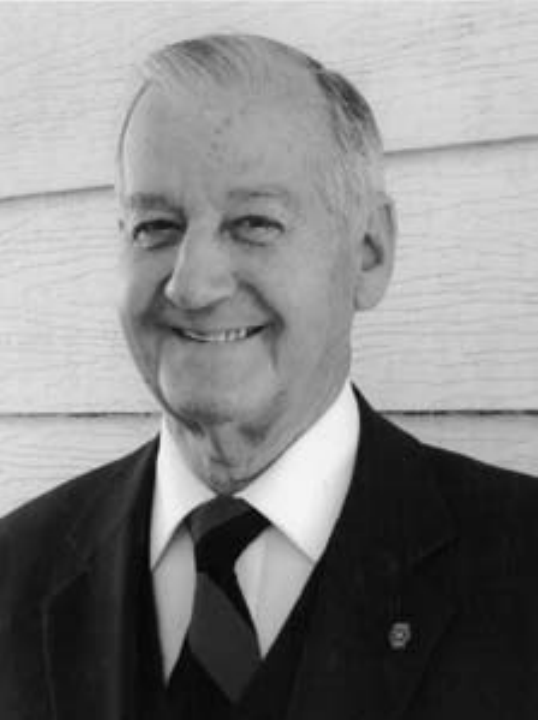
Nominee	Maureen O'Connor	Floyd Morrow
Party	Democratic	Democratic
Popular vote	126,366	71,293
Percentage	59.5%	33.6%
Mayor before election
Maureen O'Connor
Democratic
Elected mayor
Maureen O'Connor
Democratic

The 1988 San Diego mayoral election was held on June 7, 1988, to elect the mayor for San Diego. Incumbent mayor Maureen O'Connor stood for reelection.

Municipal elections in California are officially non-partisan, though some candidates do receive funding and support from various political parties. The non-partisan primary was held June 7, 1988. Since the incumbent O'Connor received a majority of the primary votes, she was reelected outright with no need for a runoff.

== Candidates ==
- Maureen O'Connor, mayor of San Diego
- Floyd Morrow, former member of the San Diego City Council and mayoral candidate in 1986
- Charles Ulmshneider, newspaper distributor
- John Kelley, semi-retired public relations man, bible distributor, and perennial candidate
- Rose Lynne, retired teacher and perennial candidate

== Campaign ==
Incumbent mayor Maureen O'Connor was seen as the favorite going into the election. Former City Council member Floyd Morrow was considered her chief challenger, though he consistently polled well short of O'Connor. Morrow struggled to gain attention in the race, with O'Connor refusing to attend candidate forums where he might appear. On June 7, 1988, O'Connor received the majority of the votes and was re-elected mayor.

== Primary election results ==
San Diego mayoral primary election, 1988
Party	Candidate	Votes	%
Democratic	Maureen O'Connor (incumbent)	126,366	59.5
Democratic	Floyd Morrow	71,293	33.6
Democratic	Charles Ulmschneider	7,653	3.6
Nonpartisan	John Kelley	4,095	1.9
Nonpartisan	Rose Lynne	2,976	1.4
Total votes		212,383	100

== General election ==
Because O'Connor won a majority of the votes in the March primary, there was no need for a runoff in the November general election.
