= Twentieth Century Motor Car Corporation =

American automobile company

- Industry: Automobile
- Founded: 1974
- Defunct: 1978
- Fate: Dissolved
- Headquarters: Burbank, California, US
- Key people: Geraldine Elizabeth Carmichael; Dale Clifft
- Products: Vehicles (none produced)
- Number of employees: None known other than key people

The Twentieth Century Motor Car Corporation was an American automobile company started by Geraldine Elizabeth "Liz" Carmichael in 1974 and incorporated in Nevada. The company's flagship vehicle was the Dale, a prototype three-wheeled two-seater automobile designed and built by Dale Clifft. It was touted as being powered by an 850 cc air-cooled engine and featuring 70 mpg_{‑US} (3.4 L/100 km; 84 mpg_{‑imp}) fuel economy and a $2,000 price (roughly equivalent to $12,000 in 2025), which were popular specifications during the mid-1970s US fuel crisis. No vehicles were produced.

The company would ultimately prove fraudulent when Carmichael went into hiding with investors' money.

== Vehicles ==
=== The Dale ===
Before meeting Geraldine Elizabeth "Liz" Carmichael, Dale Clifft hand-built a car made of tubing and covered in red metal flake Naugahyde. It was powered by a 305cc Honda Super Hawk motorcycle welded into the metal frame. The Dale prototype was designed and built by Clifft, and Carmichael subsequently marketed the project. Much of the interest in the Dale resulted from the 1973 oil crisis: fuel-economy automobiles like the Dale were viewed as a solution to the oil crunch. Speaking to the Chicago Sun-Times in November 1974, Carmichael said she "was on the way to taking on General Motors or any other car manufacturer for that matter". She also claimed she had millions of dollars in backing "from private parties" and talked of a 150,000 sq ft (14,000 m^{2}) corporate office in Encino, California. The prototypes were built in Canoga Park, and an aircraft hangar in Burbank was supposedly leased for the assembly plant, with more than 100 employees claimed to be on the payroll.

The Dale was also marketed as high-tech, lightweight, and safer than any existing car at the time. "By eliminating a wheel in the rear, we saved 300 pounds and knocked more than $300 from the car's price. The Dale is 190 inches long, 51 inches high and weighs less than 1,000 pounds," Carmichael claimed. She maintained that the car's lightness did not affect its stability or safety. She claimed the low center of gravity always remained inside the triangle of the three wheels, making it nearly impossible to tip over. She also went on record to say that she drove it into a wall at 30 mph (48 km/h) and there was no structural damage to the car (or her). Carmichael claimed the Dale was powered by a thoroughly overhauled BMW two-cylinder motorcycle engine, which generated 40 hp (30 kW) and would allow the car to reach 85 mph (137 km/h). She said she expected sales of 88,000 cars in the first year and 250,000 in the second year. The vehicle's wheelbase was 114 in (2.90 m).

A non-functional model of the Dale was displayed at the 1975 Los Angeles Auto Show. A model of the car was also shown on the television game show The Price Is Right as a prize.

=== Other vehicles ===
Carmichael proposed two additional vehicles to complement the Dale: the Revelle and the Vanagen, which are station wagons. Both featured a three-wheeled design and used the same two-cylinder engine. None of the vehicles were produced, and only three prototype Dale vehicles were made. Only one prototype could move under its own power.

== Fraud ==
The company had already encountered legal troubles when California's Corporations Department ordered it to stop offering stock for public sale because it had no permit.

Rumors of fraud emerged, followed by investigations by a TV reporter and some newspapers. The California Department of Corporations began an investigation as well. Although Clifft said he still believed in the project and was promised $3 million in royalties once the Dale went into production, he only received $1,001, plus a $2,000 check, which bounced. Carmichael went into hiding and was featured in a 1989 episode of Unsolved Mysteries, which detailed the fraud behind the Dale for which she was a wanted fugitive. She was eventually found working at a flower shop in Dale, Texas, under the alias Katherine Elizabeth Johnson. She was arrested, extradited to California, tried, and sent to prison for eighteen months.

Carmichael died of cancer in 2004. Clifft, who was never shown to have been involved in the fraud, later formed The Dale Development Co. and developed and received several patents before dying in 1981.

== HBO documentary ==
HBO premiered a four-part documentary titled The Lady and the Dale on January 31, 2021. The directors of the series are Nick Cammilleri and Zackary Drucker. The documentary has been described as "... a lot of stories - about fraud, flight, FBI manhunts, transgender politics, selective prosecution, bias in the media, and corruption in the courts."
