= Bill Cleator =

American politician from California (1927–1993)

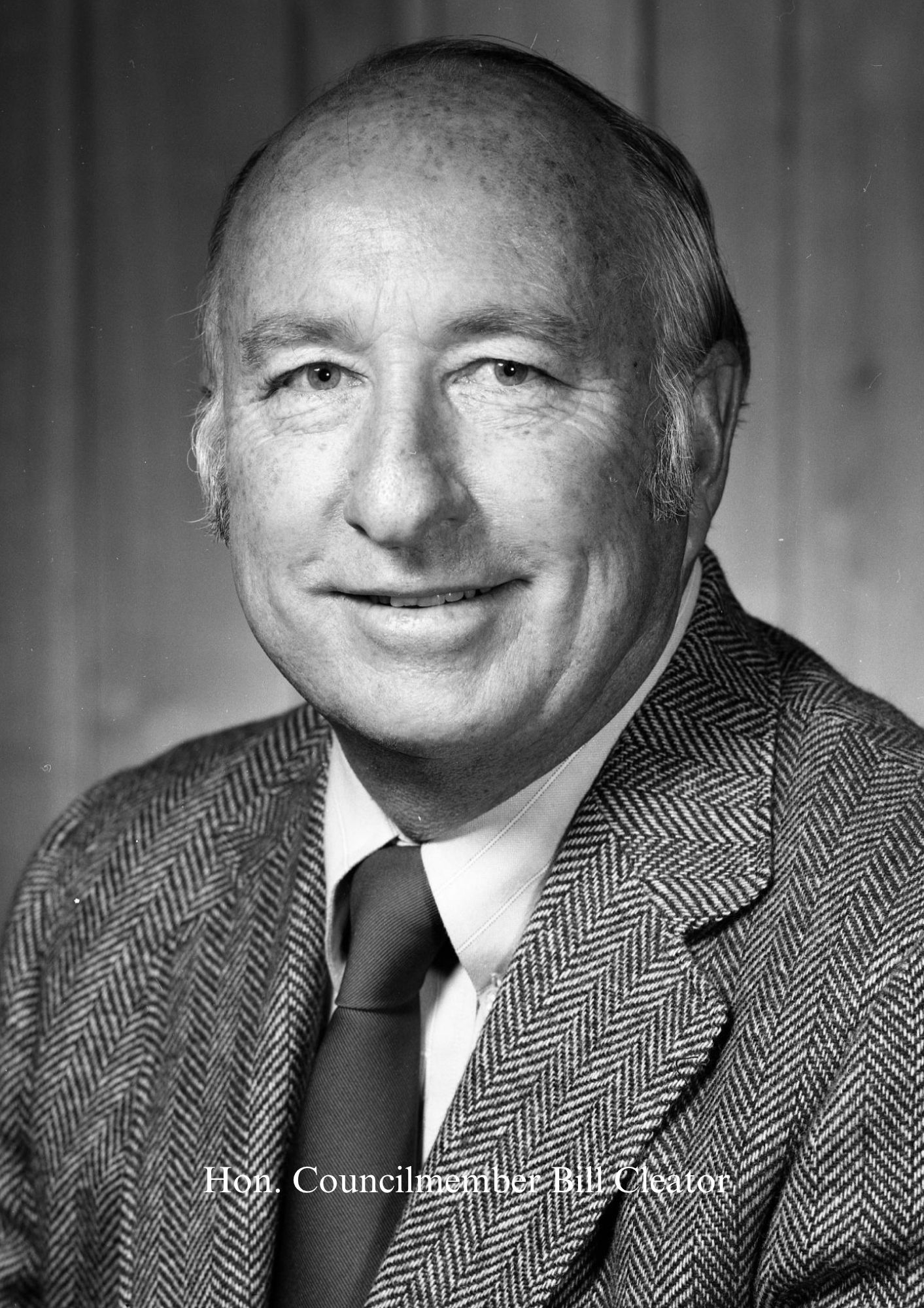

Member of San Diego City Council representing the Second District
- In office 1979–1987
- Preceded by: Maureen O'Connor
- Succeeded by: Ron Roberts

Acting Mayor of San Diego
- In office January 3, 1983 – May 3, 1983
- Preceded by: Pete Wilson
- Succeeded by: Roger Hedgecock

Personal details
- Born: May 25, 1927 California
- Died: February 10, 1993 (aged 65) San Diego
- Party: Republican
- Spouse: Marilyn Manville Cleator
- Children: 3
- Profession: Politician, Businessman

William Edward Cleator Sr. (May 25, 1927 – February 10, 1993) was an American politician from San Diego, California. He served on the San Diego City Council for six years including five months as acting mayor of San Diego. He was a Republican, although city positions are officially nonpartisan per California state law.

== Life and career ==
Cleator was born in San Diego and served in the Navy. He was a successful industrialist, retiring as CEO of Tool Research Inc. in 1977. He then started Cleator Furniture, a custom office furniture manufacturing business in San Diego, with his nephew, Robert K. Cleator Jr.

In 1979 Cleator was elected to the San Diego City Council representing district 2. He served for six years, from 1979 to 1986. He was known as a rather outspoken populist. When Mayor Pete Wilson was elected to the U.S. Senate, Cleator served as acting mayor of San Diego from January to May 1983. While serving as acting mayor he hosted a February 1983 visit by Queen Elizabeth II, during which he was heavily criticized for a faux pas. Trying to be helpful on a harbor tour, he lightly touched the queen's back and said "This way, your Majesty," but touching the Queen is against royal protocol.

He ran for mayor in 1983 in the special election to replace Wilson, but was defeated. He ran again for mayor in 1986 and was defeated in the primary election. He decided not to run for a third term on the city council.

Cleator helped start the San Diego Cruise Industry Consortium in the 1980s, which attracted cruise ships to call at a new downtown cruise ship terminal.

He died of cancer in 1993 at his home in the Point Loma neighborhood of San Diego. He is buried with his wife, Marilyn, at Fort Rosecrans National Cemetery. Bill Cleator Community Park in Point Loma is named for him.

== See also ==
- Oral history interview, San Diego Historical Society

Political offices
| Preceded by Pete Wilson | Mayor of San Diego, California (acting); 1983 | Succeeded by Roger Hedgecock |
