= Light of Freedom =

Sculpture by Abigail DeVille

- Light of Freedom installed at the Hirshhorn Museum and Sculpture Garden
- Artist: Abigail DeVille
- Year: 2020
- Medium: Metal scaffolding, mannequin arms, welded steel, mixed media
- Dimensions: 400 cm × 240 cm × 240 cm (156 in × 96 in × 96 in)

Light of Freedom is a sculpture installation by American artist Abigail DeVille created in 2020. DeVille has said the sculpture celebrates "people that hooked each other arm-in-arm, and protested ... to fight for whatever this nation actually pretends that it was founded or based on."

== Artwork ==
Light of Freedom is a sculptural reimagining of the torch from Frédéric Auguste Bartholdi's Statue of Liberty (Liberty Enlightening the World) in New York Harbor. Specifically, DeVille was inspired by a photo of the torch from 1876 when it was being exhibited, separately from the rest of the statue, in Madison Square Park.

The work consists of steel welded to form a hollow cage in the shape of a torch with a flame. At the top of the torch handle, inside the welded steel, is a reclaimed rusted metal school bell that cannot be rung. The flame is filled with outstretched mannequin arms painted blue. The torch is surrounded by metal scaffolding painted gold with metal cables attached to keep the torch aloft within the scaffolding. Three wooden planks are positioned at different angles on the scaffolding platforms, surrounding the torch. The entire structure sits on top of four small concrete pedestals.

== History ==
The piece was created and displayed for the first time following the George Floyd protests in 2020. It was commissioned by the Madison Square Park Conservancy and originally installed in the park from October 27, 2020 to January 31, 2021. The work was shown at the Crystal Bridges Museum's the Momentary in 2021 and the Hirshhorn Museum and Sculpture Garden in 2021 and 2022.

== Reception ==
Light of Freedom was widely acclaimed after its unveiling. Writing in the Observer, journalist Helen Holmes said that DeVille's use of the torch motif was "challenging us to look hard at the flimsiness of the lies we’ve been told about who has been allowed to be truly free." Curator and critic Lilly Wei described the work as "much more accessible than most monuments, able to be seen almost at eye level, transforming it from a lofty ideal to something more mundane: liberty and justice as an ordinary right within reach of all" in Studio International.
