= St. Mary's Colony, Texas =

- Unincorporated community
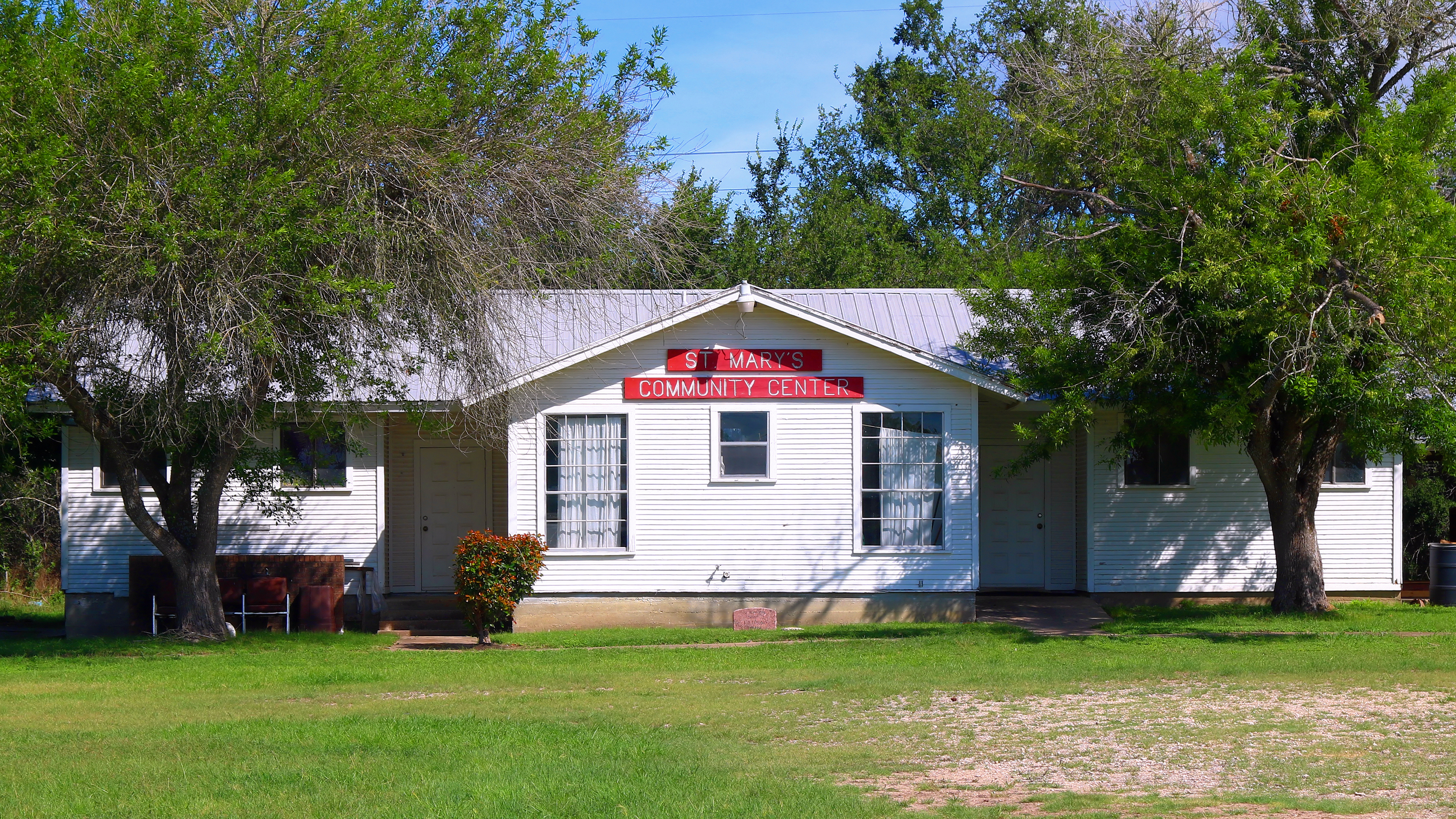
- The St. Mary's Colony community center

- Location within Texas Location within the United States
- Coordinates: 30°03′38″N 97°36′22″W
- Country: United States
- State: Texas
- County: Bastrop
- Time zone: UTC-6 (Central (CST))
  - Summer (DST): UTC-5 (CDT)
- Area codes: 512 & 737

St. Mary's Colony is an unincorporated community in Bastrop County, Texas, United States. It is located in the far western corner of the county, 17 miles west of the town of Bastrop on State Highway 21.

== History ==
The black farming community was established by the Doyle and Patton families following emancipation when James and Mary Doyle transferred 2,000 acres of land to their former slaves. A preacher known as Meridan gave the town its name. A two-room, two-teacher Rosenwald School was constructed in 1925-1926. Prior to World War II, the population of St. Mary's exceeded 300 residents.

Following the war, many people moved to Austin for employment rather than suffer the difficult life of dry-land farming. The colony's population had dropped to only a few families when Willie Mae Wilson, a former resident, sought to bring water lines to the area. In 1976, with the help of U.S. representative J. J. Pickle, a $2.7 million grant was secured. It enabled the Farmer's Home Administration and Aqua Water Supply Corporation, a regional water cooperative serving rural Bastrop County, to complete the project. When water lines started serving St. Mary's Colony in early 1979, former members of the community began to return and set up summer homes.

== Location ==
Although the town does not appear on county highway maps, The Texas Almanac 2018-2019 lists St. Mary's population at 50. St. Mary's Community Center, formerly the old Rosenwald schoolhouse, is located on Highway 21 near the intersection of Laredo Drive. On maps, the address is shown as Dale, Texas.
