= Dick Carlson =

American journalist and diplomat (1941–2025)

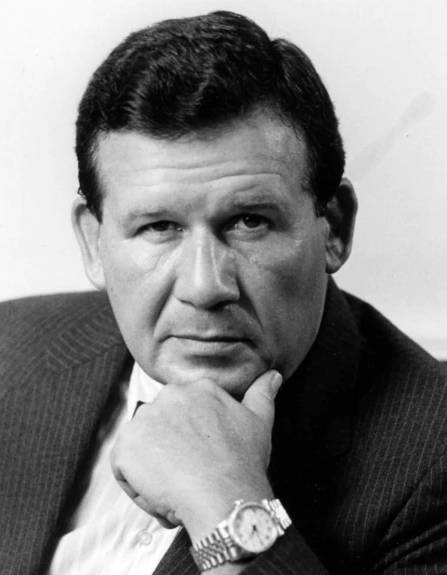
- Carlson between 1986 and 1991

United States Ambassador to Seychelles
- In office October 1, 1991 – July 5, 1992
- President: George H. W. Bush
- Preceded by: James Byron Moran
- Succeeded by: Mack Mattingly

Personal details
- Born: Richard Anderson; February 10, 1941 Boston, Massachusetts, U.S.
- Died: March 24, 2025 (aged 84) Boca Grande, Florida, U.S.
- Party: Republican
- Spouses: Lisa McNear Lombardi (m. 1967; div. 1976); Patricia Caroline Swanson (m. 1979; died 2023)
- Children: 2, including Tucker

Richard Warner Carlson (born Richard Anderson; February 10, 1941 – March 24, 2025) was an American journalist, diplomat and lobbyist who was the director of the Voice of America from 1986 to 1991. Carlson also was a newspaper and wire service reporter, magazine writer, documentary filmmaker, and television/radio correspondent. He was the father of conservative political commentator Tucker Carlson.

== Early life and education ==
Richard Anderson was born in Boston on February 10, 1941, the son of college student Richard Boynton and Dorothy Anderson, 18 and 15 years old, respectively. He was born with rickets and mildly bent legs, as Anderson had starved herself to keep the pregnancy a secret.

Shortly after he was born, he was given to The Home for Little Wanderers, an orphanage in Boston. The home ran a classified ad about him in the local papers, under the headline: "Home Wanted for Foundling." Florence Moberger, a housewife in Malden, was the only person to respond. She and her husband Carl had three children but were unable to have more. Carl and Florence agreed to foster Richard until a family wanted to adopt him. He lived with the Mobergers for over two years and stated that he developed a deep bond with the family. During that time, he claimed many prospective parents came to visit him, including his birth mother, posing as her own sister. In 1943, Richard Boynton attempted to persuade Dorothy Anderson to accompany him in stealing their baby and get married; when she refused on the grounds that she was a junior in high school and nobody but her parents knew about the baby, he shot and killed himself two blocks from her house.

That same year, he was adopted by Warner Carlson, a wool broker, and his wife Ruth, and took their surname. Carlson's adoptive father died when he was twelve.

Carlson graduated from the Naval Academy Preparatory School and attended the University of Mississippi through an ROTC program, holding odd jobs in between the breaks. He was discharged in 1962 and did not graduate. He then moved to Los Angeles.

== Career ==
=== Independent journalism ===
When Carlson was 22, he got a job working as a "copy boy" for night city editor Glenn Binford at the Los Angeles Times. There he met and befriended Carl Lance Brisson, the son of actress Rosalind Russell.

In 1963, Carlson became a reporter for United Press International. On his two days off, he wrote for Hearst movie columnist Louella Parsons in her Beverly Hills office. He also wrote for UPI's Foreign Film Bureau, contributing fan magazine stories and working under the editorship of Henry Gris, the first president of the Hollywood Foreign Press Association.

Two years later, Carlson and Brisson went to San Francisco to try to establish themselves, working as freelance independent television reporters, producing news features to sell for local and national distribution. They made less than $100 per week, until they were hired full-time by KGO-TV.

Carlson and Brisson became best known for a September 1969 article in Look, in which they linked Mayor Joseph Alioto to organized crime. Alioto later filed a $12 million libel lawsuit against the magazine. After three inconclusive jury trials, a fourth trial by judge without a jury in 1977 found that the plaintiff had sustained the burden of proving by clear and convincing evidence that defendant published the defamatory statements contained in the article with actual malice, that is, with reckless disregard for whether they were true or not, and was entitled to judgment in the sum of $350,000, plus costs. and the legal costs helped bring about the demise of Look. Legal technicalities prevented Carlson and Brisson from being held as defendants in the trial. Carlson stood by the story, claiming several of their sources refused to testify or died. It was later reported that according to leaked FBI documents that Alioto did have links to organized crime and that he had lied under oath about his associations.

=== Investigative journalism ===
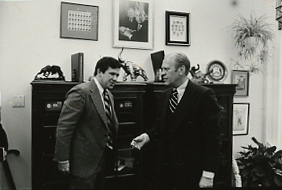
Carlson with President Gerald Ford on June 4, 1976

In 1971, Carlson was hired by KABC-TV in Los Angeles. Working with producer Pete Noyes, Carlson won several awards, including a Peabody Award for an exposé they produced about car promotion fraud.

In 1975, Noyes took a job at KFMB-TV in San Diego, and asked Carlson to join him as a combination news anchorman and investigative reporter. However, Carlson walked away from the job after 18 months, tiring of news, calling it a "kid's game" that was "insipid, sophomoric and superficial" and laced with "a lot of arrogance and hypocrisy." He admitted to being part of that hypocrisy, by citing a piece he did that outed a local tennis player, Dr. Renée Richards, as a transgender woman.

Carlson also targeted G. Elizabeth Carmichael and outed her as a transgender con-artist, refusing to refer to her as a woman when instructed to by the judge presiding over the trial. This story was popularized in the HBO miniseries, The Lady and the Dale.

There are so many other things I think are important and interesting but the media can be counted on to do handstands over that kind of scandal and sexual sensation.

=== Banker ===
In 1977, Carlson joined San Diego Federal Savings and Loan (later Great American First Savings), a savings and loan headed by Gordon Luce, a former Governor of California's cabinet member under his close friend Ronald Reagan, as its public affairs director. Within three years, he became vice president of finance.

Great American First Savings was mired in controversy due to the bank's political connections. For example, in 1984, the bank received negative press for allowing Edwin Meese, adviser to Ronald Reagan, to be 15 months delinquent on his mortgage. That same year, bank officers were accused of receiving federal jobs in exchange for being favorable toward Meese. Luce stated that he saw the loans to Meese as the "natural evolution" of mixing business, politics, and friendship.

In 1981, the investigative television magazine 60 Minutes had Mike Wallace interview Carlson about controversial home foreclosures executed by the bank, in which the bank had been accused of duping low-income Californians. Carlson hired a camera crew to videotape the interview and, when the 60 Minutes cameras were not rolling during a commercial break, caught Wallace making a racist joke about blacks and Hispanics:

"You bet your ass [the contracts are] hard to read" ... if you're reading them over watermelon or tacos.

Wallace was forced to apologize, and Carlson left Great American in early 1983 to go into politics.

=== 1984 mayoral campaign ===
In 1983, Carlson sought an appointment to the San Diego County Board of Supervisors.

The following year, Carlson decided to run for mayor of San Diego in what became a contentious campaign against incumbent Roger Hedgecock, who was under indictment for perjury and conspiracy.

Carlson was criticized throughout his campaign. For example, he was criticized for speaking of his candidacy in terms of political strategy, without mentioning a vision or plans for the city. He was criticized for being "long on generalities and platitudes, but short on specifics." He was criticized as naïve for saying that the city wasn't run by the mayor, but by the city manager. He was further criticized for pledging not to spend his own money on the campaign, but going on to spend nearly $225,000 of his own money, and by "gay-baiting"—falsely claiming that Hedgecock was supported by the gay community in an effort to turn voters away from his opponent. Carlson also had a comic, at one of his major fundraisers, tell a series of racist jokes for which Carlson later apologized.

Carlson's campaign came under scrutiny for its close ties to Great American First Savings, which had direct ties to the White House. Thirty employees donated over $4,000, each, to his campaign, while only one employee donated to Hedgecock. When pressed on the connection, and on other campaign issues, Carlson began to skip candidate forums, and members of the press deemed it increasingly difficult to get ahold of him, with Carlson often not responding to the press for periods of two weeks at a time. Carlson also lacked more exposure because Hedgecock, calling Carlson "a minor candidate," refused to debate him.

There are two major questions in voters' minds. The first is whether Roger Hedgecock has compromised the office of mayor sufficient to the point where people feel he should be turned out. The other is whether Dick Carlson is competent and qualified to be mayor. On November 6, I think the majority of people will answer "yes" to both questions.

— Dick Carlson, Oct. 21, 1984

After spending $1.2 million on the campaign, and outspending Hedgecock by a 2:1 margin, Carlson lost the election 42.1% to 57.9%.

=== Voice of America ===
In the summer of 1986, U.S. President Ronald Reagan announced his intention to nominate Carlson as an associate director of the United States Information Agency to succeed Ernest Eugene Pell.

Carlson became director of Voice of America, a U.S. government-funded, state-owned multimedia agency which serves as the United States federal government's official institution for non-military, external broadcasting. It broadcasts 24 hours a day in nearly 50 languages to more than 130 million people around the world, with a full-time staff of 3,000 and a part-time staff of 1,200. Carlson was the longest-serving director in VOA's 50-year history.

=== Ambassador to Seychelles ===
In June 1991, Carlson left Voice of America after President George H. W. Bush nominated him to be the U.S. ambassador to the Seychelles.

=== CEO ===
In March 1992, Carlson became the CEO of the Corporation for Public Broadcasting (CPB), a "private corporation funded by the American people" that produces and distributes programming for public broadcasting.

During his tenure, the Republican Party began its official shift on public broadcasting when it added a plank to its platform condemning public media as "misguided," "ridiculous," and undeserving of government support. The party's official position was that public media had a liberal bias and "the party looked forward to" the privatization of the system.

Critics decried that Republicans were weaponizing public broadcasting in order to make it an election issue against candidates who supported it. Carlson said that he was against the platform change:

The Republicans are misinformed. They are putting the blame on the wrong outfit.

Carlson remained at the CPB for five years.

=== King World Public ===
In 1997, he became president and CEO of King World Public Television, a subsidiary of King World Productions, the syndicator of Oprah, Wheel of Fortune, and Jeopardy!, among other successful TV shows, until the network was purchased, in the summer of 1999, by CBS for $2.5 billion.

=== Foreign relations ===
Carlson testified dozens of times before various U.S. Congressional committees, including the Senate Foreign Relations Committee and the House Foreign Relations Committee. He was also involved in negotiations on behalf of the U.S. government with many foreign governments, including those of China, Korea, the USSR, Germany, Georgia, Zaire (today the Democratic Republic of the Congo), Lesotho, South Africa, Somalia, and Israel.

In 1990, while serving as Director of VOA, Carlson jointly addressed the Israeli Knesset with Steve Forbes.

In 1994, Carlson was an international observer at the first democratic elections in South Africa.

In 1997, he was deployed by the Organization for Security and Co-operation in Europe to work as an international observer at the Parliamentary Elections in Albania, overseeing polling places near the Greek border.

From 1992 to 1997, he was president of InterMedia, the Russian state-owned global research consulting firm which conducts opinion surveys for government agencies in over 75 foreign countries. He was recently its chairman. Later, Carlson became an advisor of the Institute for the Study of Terrorism & Political Violence.

In 2003, Carlson became the vice-chairman of the Foundation for Defense of Democracies, the counter-terrorism institute in Washington, D.C., and Brussels, Belgium. He held the position for eight years.

In 2021, Carlson was reported to be on the Board of Directors of Policy Impact, a lobbying firm. The firm has lobbied the United States on behalf of the Viktor Orbán government in Hungary.

=== Author ===
Carlson co-wrote Snatching Hillary: A Satirical Novel (Tulip Hill Publishing, 2014, ISBN 0692337008) with Bill Cowan.

He was also the author of numerous independently published books, including Women in San Diego: A History in Photographs (1978), and Why Dogs Talk on Christmas Eve (2014).

He wrote a weekly newspaper column, often about terrorism and national security, for the Pittsburgh Tribune-Review and the Charleston Mercury. He was a political gossip columnist writing "The Shadow Knows" for The Hill newspaper in Washington, D.C., with Bill Regardie.

== Personal life ==
In 1967, Carlson married artist Lisa McNear (née Lombardi). They had two sons, Tucker McNear Carlson (later, Tucker Swanson McNear Carlson), born in 1969, and Buckley Peck Carlson (later, Buckley Swanson Peck Carlson). Carlson and Lombardi divorced in 1976. Carlson was granted custody of Tucker and Buckley. Tucker Carlson would later say that his mother left the family when he was six, wanting to pursue a "bohemian" lifestyle.

In 1979, Carlson married Patricia Caroline Swanson, an heiress to the Swanson frozen-food fortune. Swanson was the daughter of Gilbert Carl Swanson, and the niece of Senator J. William Fulbright. This was the third marriage for Swanson, who legally adopted Tucker Carlson and his brother.

Carlson was said to be an active father who had a specific outlook in raising his sons:

I want them to be self-disciplined to the degree that I think is necessary to find satisfaction ... you measure a person on how far they go, on how far they've sprung. My parents, the Carlsons, they instilled a modesty in me that, at times, gets in my way ... I know it's immodest of me to say it, but it's difficult sometimes when you want to beat your own drum and say what you really think.

In 1984, Carlson was in business with Karon Luce, wife of savings and loan executive Gordon Luce, manufacturing modular cabinets.

Carlson and his wife lived in Chevy Chase, Maryland, and in a small Virginia town on the Chesapeake Bay. They had a summer home on an island in Maine.

Carlson died from pneumonia at his home in Boca Grande, Florida, on March 24, 2025, at the age of 84.

Diplomatic posts
| Preceded by James B. Moran | United States Ambassador to Seychelles; 1991–1992 | Succeeded by Mack F. Mattingly |
