= Peter Noyes (journalist) =

American newscaster and reporter

Peter "Pete" Noyes was an American newscaster and reporter.

== Biography ==
He began his career working for Stars and Stripes while serving in the Korean War, before going on to work for the City News Service in LA. Noyes worked at KNXT (now KCBS-TV) from 1961 to 1972. He was an inspiration for the television character Lou Grant.

In 1973 his book Legacy of Doubt: Did the Mafia Kill JFK? was released, which argued that organized crime had a role in the assassination of John F. Kennedy. It was the first book to suggest that the mafia were behind the assassination. Noyes recalled that "the book was so controversial that I got threatened with lawsuits six times, sued four times and I won them all". In 1975 he and Dick Carlson were recipients of the Peabody Award for their reporting on the fraudulent practices of G. Elizabeth Carmichael. After he retired from news he published a number of books. In 2008 The Real L.A. Confidential was released, it detailed some of Los Angeles' most infamous crimes. In 2015 he published Who Killed the Big News.

Noyes taught newswriting classes at the University of Southern California and Cal State Northridge. He was also a long-term member of the board of the 8-Ball Emergency Fund for Journalists, which provides grants to journalists. He died on 1 February 2021 at his Westlake Village home, aged 90. Over the course of his career he accumulated one Peabody Award, ten Emmys, two Edward R. Murrow awards and many Golden Mike Awards. He had a son, Jack Noyes, who worked for KNBC.

== Bibliography ==
- Legacy Of Doubt. Pinnacle Books. 1973.
