= Bill Cowan =

United States Marine Corps officer

- Born: Sacramento, California
- Education: United States Naval Academy
- Military career
- Branch: USMC
- Rank: Lieutenant colonel
- Conflicts: Vietnam War

William V. Cowan, is a retired USMC lieutenant colonel and a former contributor for the Fox News Channel from 2001 to 2016.

Cowan was born in Sacramento, California. He enlisted in the United States Navy at the age of 17, received an appointment to and graduated from the U.S. Naval Academy in 1966, and was commissioned as a lieutenant the United States Marine Corps. He subsequently spent three and a half years in Vietnam. On his first tour he served as a platoon commander with the 3rd Battalion, 26th Marines, along the DMZ and at the siege of Khe Sanh, and later was in charge of the 3rd Marine Division's Kit Carson Scouts program for five months. From 1969 onwards, he was advisor for the South Vietnam military in the Rung Sat Special Zone for two and a half years. Most of that time was spent with small units and getting experience of raids, ambushes, riverine operations and intelligence gathering with the Central Intelligence Agency. During his last year he led the Rung Sat's Provincial Reconnaissance Unit. He received numerous awards for valor in combat and was wounded three times.

== Intelligence Support Activity (ISA) ==
In April 1983, after having been offered a job at the White House Science Advisor's office, he was approached by the Intelligence Support Activity (ISA) to replace the previous U.S. Marine representative as ISA deputy operations officer. He turned down the White House offer, going instead to ISA where he conducted numerous missions as an ISA operative, including being with the team that hunted down and targeted those responsible for the bombing of the Marine barracks in Beirut, which killed 241 servicemen (220 Marines, 18 Navy personnel and 3 Army personnel). He retired from the Marine Corps after what he perceived as inaction by the Pentagon towards dealing with this incident.

== Special Operations Command ==
After he retired from the ISA, he worked as legislative assistant to Senator Warren B. Rudman during the hearings of the Iran Contra scandal, and was a key staff member in drafting the legislation which created the U.S. Special Operations Command in Tampa, Florida. Against strong opposition from the Reagan White House, Rudman was instrumental in getting the legislation passed.

== The Middle East ==
Following his time as a staff assistant to Senator Warren Rudman he again became involved with global terrorism and the Middle East. Cowan was involved in some of the most famous hostage rescues of the Middle East. One of his rescues, the 1990 rescue of American businessmen in Kuwait after Saddam Hussein had invaded that country, was the subject of a documentary where some secrets about his organization were revealed, such as the fact that organization operatives used fake passports issued by a man in Paris to enter countries where people were being held. This operation was conducted in combination with former CIA director Bill Colby. It also included him being part of a three-man team who secretly met with the Iranians at the request of the White House to lay the formal groundwork for the release of the Western hostages being held in Lebanon.

== Unacknowledged Pentagon Programs ==
According to an article published in Politico in 2018, from 2002 to 2015 Cowan was involved in work for the Pentagon that “was so secret that only about a half-dozen people in the U.S. government were aware of it.” That work involved running numerous unacknowledged “special access programs” (SAPs) into the Middle East, including Iraq and Iran — assignments so secretive that information about them is restricted to only those with an absolute need-to-know.

== Other ==
Cowan has a graduate degree in computer science and is a member of Mensa. He was a co-host with Ambassador Dick Carlson on the radio and television show Danger Zone, and he has written articles for The Washington Times, The Washington Post, The Daily Caller, Breitbart, The Hill, and has been featured in several television shows apart from the documentary such as 60 Minutes, Larry King Live and others.

He co-wrote Snatching Hillary, A Satirical Novel (Tulip Hill Publishing, 2014, ISBN 0692337008) with Dick Carlson.
