= Artstar =

- Created by: Christopher Sperandio & James Fuentes
- Starring: Jeffrey Deitch
- Country of origin: United States

Production
- Running time: 46 minutes

Original release
- Network: Gallery HD
- Release: June 1 – July 19, 2006

Artstar is an unscripted reality television series set in the New York City art world, considered to be the first in the visual arts. Selected from an open call of over 400 applicants, eight artists participate in a group exhibition at Deitch Projects with the opportunity for a solo exhibition as well. The program documents the selected artists as they interact with leading critics, curators, collectors, and artists in New York, while making new works as part of the collaborative exhibition.

== Featured guest critics and artists ==
Critics/curators featured on the program include Barbara Pollack, Debra Singer, David Rimanelli, Carlo McCormick, RoseLee Goldberg, Cary Leitzes, Alan Vega, Yvonne Force, James Fuentes and Mark Fletcher. Established artists interacting with the selected emerging artists include Jeff Koons, Kehinde Wiley, Jon Kessler, Lee Quiñones and Steve Powers.

== Exhibition ==
In the second episode of the series, the Artstars were asked to participate in The Art Parade, a Deitch Projects event where artists, performers and designers were invited to create floats, placards, spectacles and street performances. The Artstars were less than enthusiastic about the prospect (Abigail Deville is quoted in The New York Times on May 28, 2006 as saying, "I mean, come on, a parade?"). Christian Dietkus, one of the other artists, confronted Jeffrey Deitch about whether or not an actual Artstar exhibition would also be part of the television program, as originally promised. Deitch was vague about specifics at the time but promised that there would be a gallery show at some point.

On February 9, 2006, Deitch Projects opened the Artstar exhibition to the public, showcasing the culminating product of the Artstars' individual efforts during the program. Anney Fresh created a giant polar bear with its head stuck in a crate. Visitors could comb the bear's hair and look into the crate to see the bear's dreams. Virgil Wong exhibited a twenty foot tall mural depicting a walking figure composed of both paint and digital three-dimensional video projections. Visitors to the gallery could inject medical nanotechnology into the body using a video game controller, and a pool of moving MRI brain images reflected in a Zen-like garden.

== Biographies of the Artstars ==
Virgil Wong is an NEA grant recipient and a multimedia artist who creates installations, films, and paintings that visualize future medical technologies. Virgil received his fine arts degree in 2005 in illustration from the Rhode Island School of Design (RISD). Virgil earned a master's degree from Danube University in Austria and continued studies towards a doctorate degree from Teachers College. Columbia University. He started a company, Medical Avatar, creating medical visualizing tools for the healthcare industry.

Bec Stupak is an artist living and working in New York City, and is also the founding member of Honeygun Labs, an experimental video project that after a few years blossomed into a collaborative effort that at any given time had several people creating and experimenting with different styles and techniques.

Anney Fresh (Anney McKilligan) is an "Action Stylist" who has created enormous inflatables and other public art works with an artists collective called the Madagascar Institute. She is also a professional puppeteer and builder who has worked on Sesame Street, Johnny and The Sprites, Blue's Clues, Chappelle's Show, The Book of Pooh, and Bear in the Big Blue House. In 2007, Anney received a Daytime Emmy Award for Outstanding Achievement in Costume Design/Styling, after three previous nominations for the same award. A regular at the Loser's Lounge, Anney can be seen singing on stage at Joe's Pub.

Zackary Drucker is a fine art photographer. A recent graduate from the School of Visual Arts, Zackary is now studying at the California Institute of the Arts (started the Fall of 2005), where she is pursuing an MFA degree in Photography and Media. Past group exhibitions include One Man Show, an exhibition curated by Isabelle Woodley in Cooper Union's Great Hall Gallery, and Mentors, at the Visual Arts Gallery.

Gigi Chen was born in China and raised in New York, where she attended Fiorello H. LaGuardia high school, and studied fine arts techniques. From there, she went on to the School of Visual Arts, majoring in Traditional Animation. Gigi sold her first piece during the Artstar show.

Sy Colen is a retired social worker from Brownsville, New York, who creates wood and clay sculptures. Sy is the father of Dan Colen, a painter and sculptor whose work was included in the 2006 Whitney Biennial.

Christian Dietkus graduated from Cooper Union in 2005, and received his M.F.A. in 2013 from Columbia University.

Abigail DeVille graduated with a B.F.A. from Fashion Institute of Technology (FIT) in 2007. Followed by receiving a 2011 M.F.A. graduate degree in painting at Yale School of Art at Yale University. Abigail is also the first Artstar artist to sell her work on the television show.

== Screenings and broadcasts ==
The pilot episode of Artstar was privately screened during the Cannes Film Festival in 2005. The first public screening was held at the Museum of the Moving Image in New York City on May 12, 2006 at 8pm. Artstar premiered on Gallery HD on June 1, 2006 at 9pm.

- Episode 1 (June 1, 2006) - 400 artists appear on the coldest day of the year for an open call at Deitch Projects to compete for 8 spots on the program.
- Episode 2 (June 8, 2006) - The Artstars move into a huge studio space in Tribeca and must collaborate on a project for The Art Parade.
- Episode 3 (June 15, 2006) - The Artstars host a party at the Soho Grand Hotel rooftop penthouse and produce installations and performances.
- Episode 4 (June 22, 2006) - The Artstars are sent to Coney Island to paint signs with Artist Steve Powers.
- Episode 5 (June 29, 2006) - The Artstars are critiqued by art consultants and collectors Yvonne Force and Mark Fletcher—and decide on a project for The Art Parade.
- Episode 6 (July 5, 2006) - The Artstars work with graffiti artist Lee Quiñones and also visit the studios of artists Kehinde Wiley, Marc Kessler, and Jeff Koons.
- Episode 7 (July 12, 2006) - The Artstars collaborate on their project for The Art Parade and hold their open studio exhibition.
- Episode 8 (July 19, 2006) - The Art Parade launches into the streets of SoHo. The Artstar group exhibition opens at Deitch Projects.

== Criticism ==
Early episodes of Artstar have been criticized for being extended infomercials for Deitch Projects. Like Donald Trump on The Apprentice, art dealer Jeffrey Deitch is described in glowingly positive terms, by other dealers and artists in this case, and there are constant references to the "exciting" work that happens in his gallery. Also, Deitch was quoted as saying,

"In the 1970s … no self-respecting artist would have stood in line to try to get on a television show," and critics have claimed that self-respecting artists were still declining Deitch's invitation today.

While some observers have appreciated the show's avoidance of reality television cliches like eliminating contestants each week and salacious personal dramas, others contend that Artstar should have been billed instead (and produced) as an art documentary. Some have also noted that many contestants already had previous ties to Deitch Projects, making the show more scripted than it had been advertised. (For example, Sy Colen is the father of a successful artist represented by the gallery, and Bec Stupak appeared multiple times in Deitch's 2005 book Live Through This)
