= Jimmy Weldon =

American actor (1923–2023)

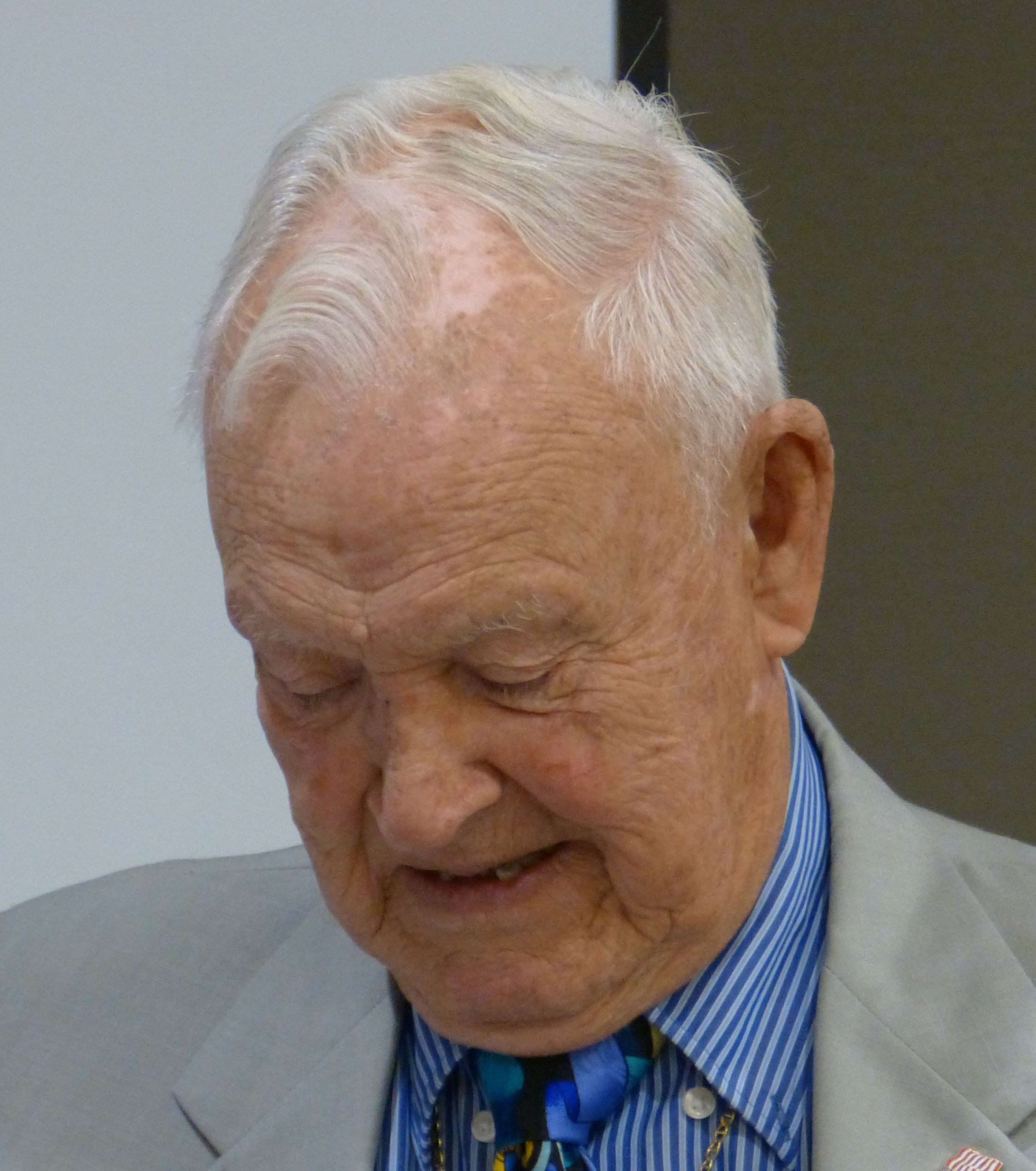
- Weldon in 2015
- Born: Ivy Laverne Shinn; September 23, 1923; Dale, Texas, U.S.
- Died: July 6, 2023 (aged 99); Paso Robles, California, U.S.
- Occupation: Actor
- Years active: 1946–2015
- Spouse: Muriel Jones (m. 1947; died 1988)

Jimmy Weldon (born Ivy Laverne Shinn, September 23, 1923 – July 6, 2023) was an American actor, ventriloquist, and television host. He was best known as the voice of the Hanna-Barbera cartoon character Yakky Doodle and the host and ventriloquist in the locally produced television series The Webster Webfoot Show. He also had a YouTube channel titled Jimmy's Lecture, where he documented stories of his time in World War II.

== Early life ==
Born Ivy Laverne Shinn on September 23, 1923, in Dale, Texas, he began his career in 1946 as a disc jockey at KWCO, the radio station which began its operations shortly after he returned home following WWII. He was the first announcer hired at this new radio station.

While there, he developed a character named Webster Webfoot, a little duck who visited him while he was playing record requests from listeners calling in. Often they just wanted to talk to little Webster. They thought Webster was someone other than Weldon, and so he became an important part of Weldon's disc jockey presentations.

== Television acting ==
In 1948, Weldon (and Webster Webfoot) moved to Duncan, Oklahoma, where they performed on another 250-watt AM station, KRHD, for two more years. The big 50,000-watt radio station WFAA in Dallas, Texas, recruited Webster and Weldon as entertainers, and Webster became a real person on television on April 4, 1950, on The Webster Webfoot Show, produced locally by station WFAA-TV.

They moved to California on September 5, 1952, joining KCOP-TV, Channel 13, in Hollywood and continued their television careers. During an appearance at a middle school in Brentwood, Jeff Chandler and Randolph Scott collected the tickets from the children and parents who came to see the show. These two movie stars made Weldon feel very lucky indeed when they commented, "Our children think more of little Webster than they do OUR movie careers." Also, Ralph Edwards was there, and he later gave Webster and Weldon the positions as co-hosts of a new children's game show titled Funny Boners, a junior version of his famous Truth or Consequences radio and television shows, which aired on ABC.

In 1956, Weldon and Webster moved to Fresno, California, which began a career in the San Joaquin Valley at KFRE-TV, Channel 12. This was interrupted, however, when NBC executives called them to New York to replace Shari Lewis on the Hi, Mom show on NBC flagship station, WRCA-TV, Channel 4.

In 1959, Channel 13 in Hollywood once again became their television home.

In 1961, Weldon and Webster were called back to the San Joaquin Valley. They continued performing their show on KJEO-TV, Channel 47, in Fresno, California, throughout the 1960s. During this time, Weldon and Webster also did TV shows in Salinas and Bakersfield, California, flying their airplane from city to city for those shows.

== Voice acting and other work ==
It was thanks to Webster's voice that Weldon earned the voice-over for the Hanna-Barbera cartoon character, Yakky Doodle. He also was the voice of Solomon Grundy on Hanna-Barbera's series Challenge of the Superfriends, and made appearances in acting on shows such as Dragnet, Alfred Hitchcock Presents, The Waltons, Dallas, and Diff'rent Strokes.

Weldon also played some supporting characters on the popular radio drama Adventures in Odyssey, and was a member of the Premiere Speakers Bureau.

== Death ==
Weldon died at an assisted living residence in Paso Robles, California, on July 6, 2023, at the age of 99.

== Filmography ==
Year	Title	Role	Notes
1950	Webster Webfoot Show	Uncle Jimmy	
1955	The Halls of Ivy		Episode: "Calhoun Gaddy"
1955	Alfred Hitchcock Presents	Guard	Season 1 Episode 7: "Breakdown"
1956-1957	Dragnet	Hotel Clerk	2 episodes
1959	Cartooneroony	Uncle Jimmy	
1961	The Phantom Planet	Lieutenant Webb	
1961-1962	The Yogi Bear Show	Yakky Doodle	Voice, 33 episodes
1975	The Waltons	Railroad Clerk	Episode: "The Runaway"
1975	S.W.A.T.	Diner Owner	Episode: "Kill S.W.A.T."
1975	The Family Holvak	Auctioneer	Episode: "First Love: Part 1"
1976	The New Daughters of Joshua Cabe		Television film
1977	Fred Flintstone and Friends	Yakky-Doodle	Voice
1977	The Oregon Trail	Ludlow	Episode: "Hard Ride Home"
1978	Challenge of the Superfriends	Solomon Grundy	Voice, 16 episodes
1979	B.J. and the Bear	Crockett	Episode: "Lobo's Revenge"
1979	Americathon	Big Jim, VP Research	
1979	Scooby-Doo and Scrappy-Doo	Additional voices	
1979	Dallas	Sy Stevens	Episode: "Ellie Saves the Day"
1979	The Rockford Files	John Rockfield	Episode: "The Big Cheese"
1981	Diff'rent Strokes	Ben	Episode: "Drummond's Fair Lady"
1982	The Little Rascals	Additional voices	Episode: "Rascal's Revenge"
1982	Father Murphy	Official	Episode: "Happiness Is..."
1982	Knight Rider	Announcer	Episode: "Slammin' Sammy's Stunt Show Spectacular"
1982	Ri¢hie Ri¢h	Additional voices	Episode: "Dollar's Exercise"/"Richie's Cube"/"The Maltese Monkey"/"Everybody's Doing It"
1982	Yogi Bear's All Star Comedy Christmas Caper	Yakky Doodle	Voice, television film
1983	The New Scooby and Scrappy-Doo Show	Voice	
1983	Shirt Tales	Additional voices	10 Episodes
1983	Super Friends	Solomon Grundy	Voice, episode: "The Revenge of Doom"
1984	Chattanooga Choo Choo	Rev. Norbert Puckett	Uncredited
1984	Challenge of the GoBots	Additional Voices	
1985	CBS Storybreak		Voice, episode: "Robbut A Tale Of Tails"
1985	Yogi's Treasure Hunt	Yakky Doodle, additional voices	2 episodes
1987	Popeye and Son	Additional voices	13 episodes
1988	The Wrong Guys	Scoutmaster	
1988-1991	Fantastic Max	Additional voices	3 episodes
1989	It's a Living	Billy Lee Lord	Episode: "Wedding, Wedding"
1992	Tom & Jerry Kids Show	Additional voices	Episode: "Penthouse Mouse"/"12 Angry Sheep"/"The Ant Attack"
2015	The 7D	Beansie McBean-Bean	Voice, episode: "Bing Bong Bean!"; Final role
