= Abram Lincoln Harris =

African-American economist and academic (1899–1963)

- Born: January 17, 1899; Richmond, Virginia, U.S.
- Died: November 6, 1963 (aged 64); Dale, Texas, U.S.
- Occupations: Economist; academic; anthropologist
- Spouse: 2
- Children: 1

Abram Lincoln Harris Jr. (January 17, 1899 – November 6, 1963) was an American economist, academic, anthropologist and a social critic of the condition of black people in the United States. He was considered by many as the first African American to achieve prominence in the field of economics. He was also known for his heavy influence on black radical and neo-conservative thought in the United States. As an economist, Harris is most famous for his 1931 collaboration with political scientist Sterling Spero to produce a study on African-American labor history titled The Black Worker and his 1936 work The Negro as Capitalist, in which he criticized black businessmen for not promoting interracial trade. He headed the economics department at Howard University from 1936 to 1945, and was a professor at the University of Chicago from 1945 until his death. As a social critic, Harris took an active radical stance on racial relations by examining historical black involvement in the workplace, and suggested that African Americans needed to take more action in race relations.

He received multiple fellowships from the Rosenwald Fund, established by Julius Rosenwald. He first received one in 1929 and then in 1939 and then again in 1945. The Fellowships were designed to help fund breaks or travel for African-Americans to help them pursue education or educational projects.

== Early life ==
Harris was born into a middle-class African-American family on January 17, 1899, in Richmond, Virginia. His father was a butcher at a German American-owned meat shop, and his mother was a schoolteacher. As a result of his frequent contact with the meat shop's owner, Harris learned German and became a fluent speaker of the language. His mastery of the language would help him later in life, when he examined the writings of German economists and social reformers, such as Karl Marx.

Harris served in World War I and then finished his degree at Virginia Union University, graduating in 1922 with a Bachelor of Science degree.

== Career ==
He later published two articles in the National Urban League's journal, Opportunity, that discussed the difficulties faced by African-American mineworkers. His work in this field also addressed his concern about blacks and their white counterparts. Harris examined race prejudice of blacks by white workers. Meanwhile, Harris taught at West Virginia State University, a small historically black public college in Institute, West Virginia. During this year, he began a long and sustaining friendship with V. F. Calverton. Harris taught for a year, before he shifted direction and took the position as director of the Minneapolis Urban League. As director, he prepared a detailed report titled The Negro Population in Minneapolis: A Study of Race Relations dealing with the living conditions of African Americans in Minneapolis, Minnesota. Harris described the physical and socio-economic conditions of African Americans in Minneapolis in 1926. Using census data and statistical surveys, Harris tried to show that there was a strong social rift at the workplace between blacks and whites. Harris then enrolled at Columbia University to pursue a PhD in economics. In 1927, just a year into his doctorate studies, Harris joined the faculty of Howard University. There, Harris collaborated with fellow black colleagues Ralph Bunche and E. Franklin Frazier, and attacked older values and outlooks on race.

Continuing with previous writings, Harris wrote his PhD thesis on the rift between African-American and white labor in the United States. In 1930, he became the second African American to receive a doctorate in economics in the United States, following Sadie Mossell Alexander. The following year, he collaborated his thesis with political scientist, Sterling Spero, to produce a famous study of African-American labor history entitled The Black Worker, the Negro & the Labor Movement. Harris believed that African Americans needed to contribute to the development of a working-class political party in the United States. He expressed dislike for other strategies like rebellion, secession, or the various Back to Africa movements—which Harris described as "Negro Zionism"—led by such figures as Marcus Garvey and Haile Selassie I.

In The Black Worker, Spero and Harris asserted that African Americans could put an end to the racial antagonism in the working class. They wrote about the history of the racial predicament between whites and blacks that had stemmed from the days of slavery. They argued that many African Americans had just recently migrated to the urban setting, and had been unaware of trade unionism and its benefits. They stated that the anti-union beliefs held by organizations such as the National Urban League also provided for the racial division seen in the working class between blacks and whites. Harris also was the author of a Progressive Labor Party pamphlet in 1930 that called for the formation of a working-class political party in the United States.

Harris, along with Frazier and Bunche, led the attack on the older generations at the NAACP's 1933 Amenia Conference. Harris's radical beliefs prompted a 1935 report entitled the Harris Report suggesting that the NAACP take a more active and affirmative stance on race relations in the United States. As the Great Depression progressed, Harris's radicalism declined. As Harris wrote in the 1957 introduction to his personal collection of essays, he was "emerging from a state of social rebellion [while] still adher[ing] somewhat to socialistic ideas by the late 1920s." He published his most famous economics work in 1936, The Negro as Capitalist: A Study of Banking and Business. In the work, Harris wrote about the growing anti-business sentiment of the Great Depression. Harris argued that black businessmen were under the false sense of racial solidarity between whites and blacks. He said that African Americans needed to participate in trade unionism with white businessmen. This was the reason for the problems in the development of black business. Harris concluded that the black middle class was using their racial pride and unity to support businesses controlled by the American middle class. He felt that blacks were not reaching out to whites, and black business would not grow if there was no interracial trade. In reference to black complaints against Jewish businessmen, Harris said:

In their confusion, the masses are led to direct their animus against the Jew and against whiteness. The real forces behind their discomfort are masked by race which prevents them from seeing that what the Negro businessman wants most of all is freedom to monopolize and exploit the market they provide. They cannot see that they have no greater exploiter than the black capitalist who lives upon low-waged if not sweated labor, although he and his family may and often do, live in conspicuous luxury.

Despite the heavy criticism against fellow black businesspeople, Harris's book achieved notability and recognition in the field of economics during the Great Depression. In 1937, Harris founded the liberal Social Science Division of Howard University, and served as the group's leader through the late 1930s and early 1940s.

Harris left Howard in 1945 and moved to the University of Chicago, and became one of the first African-American academics with a high position at a historically white institution. His move was facilitated in part by the efforts of the Chicago economist Frank Knight, one of the founders of the famed Chicago School of economics that fostered the likes of Nobel Prize-winning economists Milton Friedman and George Stigler. Knight had been publishing many of Harris's papers on the subject of economic doctrine in The Journal of Political Economy since the late 1920s when Harris was at Howard. With his move to Chicago, Harris's economic ideologies also seemed to change. His writings took more of the tone of orthodox economics, and his previous defense of Karl Marx and other radical economists had turned into critical examinations of the works of these men.

Harris expressed deep concerns about the Soviet Union's totalitarian direction led by Joseph Stalin in works such as Black Communist in Dixie, published in the National Urban League magazine, Opportunity.

== Legacy ==
Harris is best known for his work as an economist and social critic of African American business. He had a heavy influence on both black radical and neo-conservative thought. A recipient of the Guggenheim Fellowship for Economics in 1935, 1936, 1943 and 1953, Harris was one of the leaders of black economics through the early and mid-20th century. His early works such as The Negro as Capitalist set the precedent for contemporary African-American radical thought. Harris's great number of works on race relations, such as The Black Worker, served as a model for future African-American studies. His essays in The Journal of Political Economy have played a significant role for institutionalist economists and for economists studying the history of economic doctrines.

== Texts online ==
- 1942 "Sombart and German (National) Socialism", Journal of Political Economy, Vol. 50, No. 6 (Dec. 1942), pp. 805–835
