= The Lady and the Dale =

- Genre: Documentary
- Directed by: Nick Cammilleri; Zackary Drucker
- Country of origin: United States
- Original language: English
- No. of episodes: 4

Production
- Executive producers: Mark Duplass; Jay Duplass; Mel Eslyn; Allen Bain; Andre Gaines; Nick Cammilleri; Zackary Drucker; Alana Carithers; Nancy Abraham; Lisa Heller
- Producers: Madison Passarelli; Tina Nguyen; Precious Brady-Davis
- Cinematography: Nathan M. Miller
- Editors: Christopher Donlon; Nicholas Alden; Mel Mel Sukekawa Mooring
- Production companies: HBO Documentary Films; Duplass Brothers Productions; Cinemation Studios

Original release
- Network: HBO
- Release: January 31 – February 14, 2021

The Lady and the Dale is an American documentary television miniseries revolving around Elizabeth Carmichael, who launched Twentieth Century Motor Car Corporation and created a car called "The Dale". It consists of four episodes and premiered on HBO on January 31, 2021.

== Synopsis ==
In 1970, entrepreneur Elizabeth Carmichael rose to fame with her creation: "The Dale", a fuel efficient three-wheeled car. As the car rose to prominence, it thrust Carmichael into media scrutiny about the car's technology and her own past.

The series features interviews with Carmichael's children Candi Michael and Michael Michael; grandchild Jeri Buchard; news anchors and journalists Dick Carlson, Pete Noyes and Mark Lisheron; Carmichael's brother-in-law Charles Richard Barrett; former employees of Twentieth Century Motor Car Corporation; and Susan Stryker, Mia Yamamoto and Sandy Stone.

== Episodes ==
| No. | Title | Directed by | Original release date | U.S. viewers (millions) |
|---|---|---|---|---|
| 1 | "Soldier of Fortune" | Nick Cammilleri & Zackary Drucker | January 31, 2021 | 0.206 |
| 2 | "Caveat Emptor: Buyer Beware" | Nick Cammilleri & Zackary Drucker | January 31, 2021 | 0.139 |
| 3 | "The Guilty Fleeth" | Nick Cammilleri & Zackary Drucker | February 7, 2021 | 0.114 |
| 4 | "Celestial Bodies" | Nick Cammilleri & Zackary Drucker | February 14, 2021 | 0.167 |

== Production ==
In August 2020, it was announced that Nick Cammilleri and Zackary Drucker would direct the series and executive produce, with Mark Duplass and Jay Duplass serving as executive producers under their Duplass Brothers Productions banner, with HBO Documentary Films producing and HBO set to distribute.

== Reception ==
On Rotten Tomatoes, the series holds an approval rating of 100% based on 25 reviews. The website's critical consensus states, "An intoxicating blend of historical footage, candid interviews, and animation that deftly captures Liz Carmichael's incredible life, The Lady and the Dale is a wild ride." On Metacritic, the series has a weighted average score of 76 out of 100, based on 11 critics, indicating "generally favorable reviews".

Writing for The Wall Street Journal media critic John Anderson described the series as "A lot of stories - about fraud, flight, FBI manhunts, transgender politics, selective prosecution, bias in the media, and corruption in the courts." Anderson faulted the series for its extensive use of cutout animation, an approach described as "too flippant for the subject matter."

=== Accolades ===
| Year | Award | Category | Recipient(s) | Result | Ref. |
|---|---|---|---|---|---|
| 2022 | GLAAD Media Awards | Outstanding Documentary | The Lady and the Dale | Nominated | |
