= Alberd Tersargyan =

Armenian serial killer

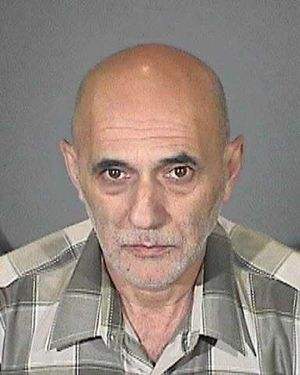
- Booking photo (2010)
- Born: 1951; Armenian SSR
- Died: April 1, 2018 (aged 66–67); Men's Central Jail, California, U.S.
- Other name: Albert Huratunyan
- Conviction: N/A (committed suicide before trial)

Details
- Victims: 4
- Span of crimes: 2008–2010
- Country: United States
- State: California
- Date apprehended: April 19, 2010

Alberd Tersargyan (Armenian: Ալբերտ Տեր-Սարգսյան; 1951 – April 1, 2018) was an Armenian-American serial killer who murdered four people in Hollywood, California from 2008 to 2010, including a woman he had been stalking and her child. Charged with four counts of murder in 2011, he committed suicide in 2018 before his trial could begin.

== Background ==
Little is known about Tersargyan's early life. Born in 1951 in the Armenian SSR, the only publicly available details about his life prior to his emigration are that he served in the Armed Forces of Armenia and styled himself as a "professional killer". He and his wife emigrated to the United States circa 2001, settling in Los Angeles' Little Armenia neighborhood, where Tersargyan found a job at a cabinet-manufacturing plant.

Around 2003, the family became acquainted with Khachik Safaryan and Karine Hakobyan, a married couple and fellow Armenians who had recently emigrated to California together with their infant daughters. The families were on good terms, and would sometimes even go on vacation together. Tersargyan reportedly became infatuated with Hakobyan and courted her on several occasions, but was rejected each time. Around mid-2008, Safaryan confided to his friend that he was secretly cheating on his wife with an old girlfriend back in Armenia, which Tersargyan secretly relayed to his wife in an attempt to have them divorced. To his dismay, Hakobyan did not want to end the marriage, which greatly angered Tersargyan. Some time afterwards, he reportedly sent an anonymous letter to Safaryan, threatening to harm him if he did not leave the country.

== Murders ==
On December 11, 2008, the Safaryan family's 12-year-old daughter returned to the family's home on 1200 Tamarind Avenue, only to find the bodies of Khachik Safaryan, her 43-year-old father, and Lusine, her 8-year-old sister. Both had been shot in the head and the incident was investigated as a double-homicide. No suspect was identified at the time. Authorities later revealed that they had questioned Tersargyan as a witness, but noted that he never mentioned his romantic feelings towards Hakobyan and was not considered a suspect at the time.

On March 12, 2010, a 46-year old prostitute named Julie Kates was fatally shot in broad daylight on Sunset Avenue. According to the testimony of an acquaintance, she was shot from across the street by a man in a dark gray van, supposedly a client who had accused Kates of stealing a DVD player from him. Police believed that she was killed with a rifle, possibly equipped with a silencer.

On March 26, 2010, the then-38-year-old Karine Hakobyan returned home from work and parked her Honda CR-V at a parking lot near her apartment complex on 5800 Lexington Avenue. Before she could exit the car, someone approached and shot her in the head before leaving the crime scene.

== Arrest, detention, and suicide ==
Soon after the murders, a colleague of Tersargyan's at the cabinet-manufacturing plant noticed that he was carrying a gun and acting in a strange manner - because of this, he reported him to an Armenian-American officer serving in the Glendale Police Department, who in turn notified investigators in Los Angeles. On April 19, Tersargyan was arrested on weapon violation charges after detectives located several handguns and rifles they believed to be unregistered. Among them was a small-caliber handgun which was sent to a lab for ballistics testing - the result determined it to be the weapon used in Hakobyan's murder.

Four days later, Tersargyan was officially charged with Hakobyan's murder and held without bail. A couple of months later, he was charged with the other three murders after ballistic evidence linked him to the crimes. The indictment made him eligible for the death penalty, and as it superseded the existing charges, it meant that no preliminary hearing would be necessary.

In a hearing discussing the case, Judge Hilleri G. Merritt issued an order to prohibit a photographer for The Los Angeles Times from publishing pictures of Tersargyan, arguing that this could result in an unfair bias against him. This was disputed by an executive for the Reporters Committee for Freedom of the Press, who said that there was no legal basis for this order. A final decision for this issue was delayed in August 2010, but its ultimate outcome remains unclear.

In 2014, Tersargyan pleaded not guilty to the Hakobyan murder charge. Tersargyan would never go on trial, as he would commit suicide at the Men's Central Jail on April 1, 2018. Court records indicate that he had been suffering from worsening Alzheimer's disease and supposed suicidal ideation.

== See also ==
- List of serial killers in the United States
