= 1983 San Diego mayoral special election =

- May 3, 1983
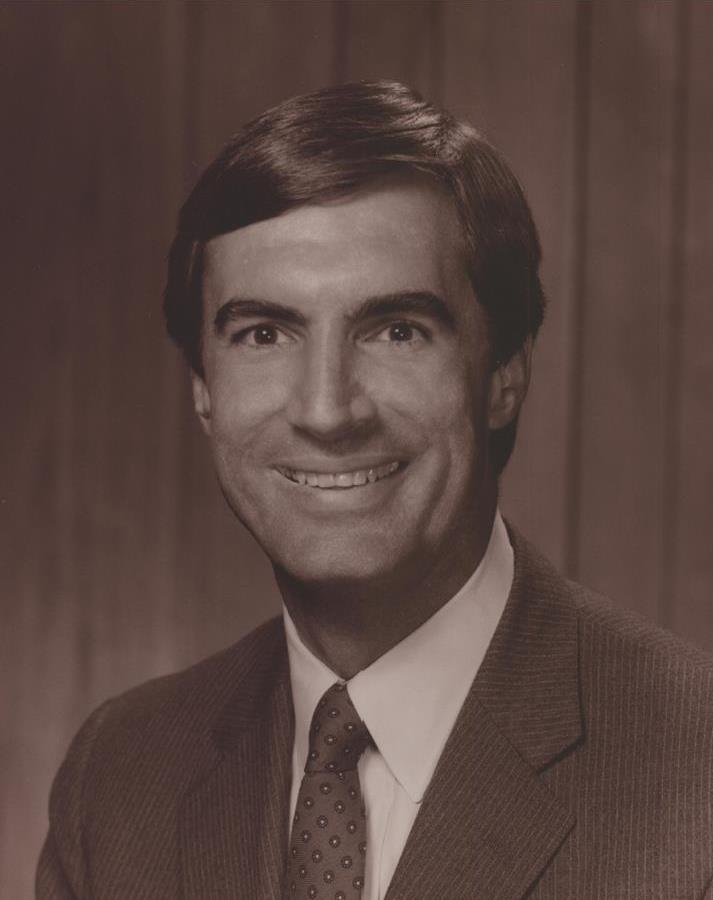

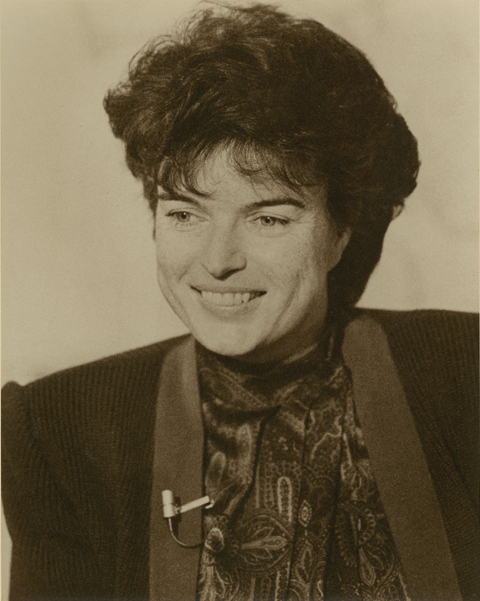
Nominee	Roger Hedgecock	Maureen O'Connor
Party	Republican	Democratic
Popular vote	105,385	96,238
Percentage	52.3%	47.7%
Mayor before election
Bill Cleator (acting)
Republican
Elected mayor
Roger Hedgecock
Republican

The 1983 San Diego mayoral special election was held on May 3, 1983, to elect the mayor for San Diego. The special election was necessary due to former mayor Pete Wilson's resignation to take a seat in the United States Senate.

Municipal elections in California are officially non-partisan, though some candidates do receive funding and support from various political parties. The non-partisan primary was held March 15, 1983. Maureen O'Connor and Roger Hedgecock received the most votes and advanced to the May runoff. Hedgecock received a majority of the votes in the May election, and was elected mayor for the remainder of Wilson's term.

== Pete Wilson resignation ==
In November 1982, San Diego Mayor Pete Wilson was elected to the United States Senate representing California. On January 3, 1983, Wilson resigned as mayor of San Diego to be sworn in as a senator. Deputy Mayor Bill Cleator served as acting mayor until an election could be held to fill the office for the remainder of Wilson's third term.

== Candidates ==
- Roger Hedgecock, San Diego County supervisor
- Maureen O'Connor, former member of the San Diego City Council
- Bill Cleator, member of the San Diego City Council and acting mayor
- Bill Mitchell, member of the San Diego City Council
- Rich Riel, businessman
- Joe Jaffe, college student
- Don Parker, businessman
- Rosalyn, retired teacher and perennial candidate
- George Hollis, optical manufacturer and engineer
- William Armstrong, unemployed former police officer
- Jim Cunradi, activist
- Paul Clark, daycare school owner
- Dan Russell, firefighter
- Oren Cox, businessman
- Jerry Shine, plastic injection molder
- Alex Weaver, economist
- John Yuskiw, potter and musician
- Art Walters, singles group founder and leader
- Leon Haake, marine engineering technician
- Walter Sweadner, computer hardware service manager

== Campaign ==
Four candidates with prior elected experience contested the special mayoral election. Former city council member Maureen O'Connor, a Democrat, was considered the early front-runner and likely to advance to a runoff election, if not win the first round outright. O'Connor's major opponents in the first round election included county supervisor Roger Hedgecock, city council member and acting mayor Bill Cleator, and city council member Bill Mitchell, all self-identified Republicans. In addition to the main four candidates, an additional 16 other candidates qualified for the ballot.

In her campaign, O'Connor proposed freezing utility rates, focusing on creating jobs, and improving public transportation. Hedgecock ran as a political moderate and emphasized environmental protection. Cleator positioned himself as a pro-business Republican, and he criticized Hedgecock as a renegade Republican.

On March 15, 1983, O'Connor came in first in the primary with 36.8 percent of the vote, followed by Hedgecock with 31.1 percent of the vote. Cleator finished in third with 25.6 percent of the vote. Mitchell, whose campaign never really took off, trailed behind in fourth with only 5.0 percent of the vote. None of the 16 minor candidates received more than 1 percent individually.

Because no candidate received a majority of the vote, O'Connor and Hedgecock advanced to a runoff election scheduled for May 3, 1983. Hedgecock ultimately prevailed in the runoff with 52.2 percent of the vote, and was elected mayor.

== Primary election results ==
San Diego mayoral special primary election, 1983
Party	Candidate	Votes	%
Democratic	Maureen O'Connor	66,054	36.8
Republican	Roger Hedgecock	55,811	31.1
Republican	Bill Cleator	46,062	25.6
Republican	Bill Mitchell	9,028	5.0
Nonpartisan	Rich Riel	1,239	0.7
Nonpartisan	Joe Jaffe	1,152	0.6
Nonpartisan	Don Parker	558	0.3
Nonpartisan	Rosalyn	416	0.2
Nonpartisan	George Hollis	384	0.2
Nonpartisan	William Armstrong	312	0.2
Nonpartisan	Paul Clark	276	0.2
Nonpartisan	Jim Cunradi	269	0.1
Nonpartisan	Dan Russell	236	0.1
Nonpartisan	Oren Cox	227	0.1
Nonpartisan	Jerry Shine	184	0.1
Nonpartisan	Alex Weaver	174	0.1
Nonpartisan	John Yuskiw	172	0.1
Nonpartisan	Art Walters	99	0.1
Nonpartisan	Leon Haake	75	–
Nonpartisan	Walter Sweadner	34	–
Total votes		179,620	100

== Runoff election results ==
San Diego mayoral special runoff election, 1983
Party	Candidate	Votes	%
Republican	Roger Hedgecock	105,385	52.3
Democratic	Maureen O'Connor	96,238	47.7
Total votes		201,623	100
