= Zackary Drucker =

American artist (born 1983)

- Born: 1983 (age 42–43); Syracuse, New York, U.S.
- Education: School of Visual Arts (BFA); California Institute of the Arts (MFA)
- Occupations: Television production, actress, performance art, photography, film
- Known for: This Is Me (2015), Transparent (2014–2016)
- Website: zackarydrucker.com

Zackary Drucker (born 1983) is an American multimedia artist, cultural producer, LGBT activist, actress, and television producer. She is an Emmy-nominated producer for the docu-series This Is Me (2015), a consultant on the TV series Transparent, and is based out of Los Angeles. Drucker is an artist whose work explores themes of gender and sexuality and critiques predominant two-dimensional representations. Drucker has stated that she considers discovering, telling, and preserving trans history to be not only an artistic opportunity but a political responsibility. Drucker's work has been exhibited in galleries, museums, and film festivals including but not limited to the 2014 Whitney Biennial, MoMA PS1, Hammer Museum, Art Gallery of Ontario, Museum of Contemporary Art San Diego, the Hammer Museum and the San Francisco Museum of Modern Art.

== Early life and education ==
Zackary Drucker was born in 1983 and raised in Syracuse, New York by what she calls "two really fantastic, progressive, educated parents." Her paternal grandfather, Eugene Drucker, was an aeronautical engineering professor at Syracuse University who consulted on the Apollo space program. Drucker did not have role models growing up, but her parents were progressive and supported her gender nonconformity. In high school, Drucker aligned herself with Kate Bornstein's books about ways of living that do not ascribe to traditional gender conventions. Drucker is a trans woman.

She received a B.F.A. degree in 2005, from the School of Visual Arts (SVA) in New York City; and a M.F.A. degree in 2007, from the California Institute of the Arts (CalArts) in Santa Clarita, California.

Her work challenges the way the audience perceives gender, and sexuality. In 2006, Drucker made her first television appearance as a contestant on Jeffrey Deitch's Artstar. After graduating from CalArts in 2007, Drucker decided to stay in Los Angeles. Photographs from her 2007 graduate thesis show, "5 East 73rd Street", feature photographs of mentor Flawless Sabrina. That same year, her work was included in a group exhibition called "Girly Show: Pin-ups, Zines & the So-Called Third Wave" at the Wignall Museum of Contemporary Art at Chaffey College in Rancho Cucamonga.

== Personal life ==
When Drucker met Rhys Ernst, Drucker had recently graduated from the School of Visual Arts and was on the TV show "Artstar". Drucker had never dated a man before and Ernst had never dated a woman. In 2014, Drucker and Ernst had a show at the Whitney Museum of American Art which captured them in day-to-day relatable scenarios like celebrating anniversaries, staying in, or relaxing by the pool. The former couple published the photographs of them together, which the New York Times stated was an important public record for transgender life. Although the couple is no longer together, Drucker and Ernst want to show that transgender people can live ordinary lives, filled with love. In a 2014 magazine, Drucker stated that she hopes that one day we can surpass the binaries of gender entirely.

Drucker chose to keep the first name Zackary after transitioning despite it being a traditionally masculine name. Drucker explained her choice by saying "I considered changing my name and when I realized that I didn’t want to, that I’d only be doing it to make everyone around me more comfortable, I decided that it was the epitome of a bad decision. Gandhi said, 'Be the change you wish to see in the world,' and the world I decided to live in is one in which a woman is named 'Zackary.'"

== Career ==
In 2011, Drucker and photographer Amos Mac collaborated on a series take in Drucker's hometown of Syracuse, titled "Home is Where the Heart is, Distance is Where You Hang Your Heart." This series was also published in "TransLady Fanzine".

Drucker and collaborator Rhys Ernst were included in the first iteration of the Hammer/LAX Art biennial. There they premiered the film "She Gone Rogue" and the film was also included in Outfest 2013. "She Gone Rogue" includes several of Drucker's mentors including Holly Woodlawn, Vaginal Davis, and Flawless Sabrina.

In 2014, Drucker and Ernst exhibited "Relationship", at the Whitney Biennial. This series of photos chronicled one couple's relationship and gender transitions. The photographic series was later exhibited at Luis De Jesus Gallery, where Drucker is represented. In 2016, "Relationship" was released as a book.

Since 2013, Drucker had worked as a consultant and producer on Amazon's original series Transparent. Media scholar Nicole Morse argues that Drucker's use of double casting in Transparent brings to light transfeminine history from the 1930s to 1994. For this role, Drucker was also involved with writing, hiring, casting, producing, providing notes on script, offering feedback, and postproduction. According to the New York Times Magazine, Drucker's and Ernst's goal for Transparent is to ensure that trans people are depicted authentically on screen and that they are also working behind the scenes. Drucker mostly contributed to the plot, script, wardrobe, and casting of episode 8, "Best New Girl" from Season 1. In this episode, Drucker believed it was crucial to capture the historical tension between those who identified as male cross-dressers and those who transition. In Season 2, Drucker was involved with shaping the historical context and casting.

In 2015, Drucker joined the cast of the E! docu-series, I Am Cait and also served as a supervising producer on the Emmy-nominated series of docu-short entitled This is Me.

In 2017, Drucker collaborated with the ACLU, Laverne Cox, Molly Crabapple, and Kim Boekbinder, for a video entitled history and "Time Marches Forward & So Do We".

In 2021, Drucker directed and executive produced alongside Nick Cammilleri, The Lady and the Dale, a HBO documentary series profiling Liz Carmichael, a trans woman who had perpetuated an ambitious con involving a 3-wheeled car.

Drucker continues her art practice and works on independent film and photography projects. Drucker focuses work on obscure aspects of the history of transgender people. In an interview with The Creative Independent Drucker mentioned, "I feel an acute sense of responsibility, of service, to the trans and gender non-conforming communities, and I think that all of us have to use our platforms to create more empathy and understanding in the world."

== Exhibitions, film festivals, performances ==
- 2007- "Girly Show: Pin-ups, Zines & the So-Called Third Wave", Wignall Museum of Contemporary Art at Chaffey College, Rancho Cucamonga, California
- 2009 - NOW Fest, "P.I.G." a multimedia performance and film with Wu Ingrid Tsang, Mariana Marroquin, REDCAT, Los Angeles, California
- 2011 - 54th Venice Biennale, Swiss Off-Site Pavilion, Venice, Italy
- 2012 - "At least you know: you exist", short film, Hammer Museum, University of California, Los Angeles (UCLA)
- 2012 - "Female Trouble" curated by Dirty Looks NYC, "Fish" video (2008), Human Resources LA
- 2012 - "Zackary Drucker: At Least You Know You Exist" July 7 - September 10, 2012 MoMA PS1, New York
- 2014 - Whitney Biennial, "Relationship", photo series with Rhys Ernst, Whitney Museum of American Art, New York City
- 2019 - "School for Endurance Work," Cal State LA Fine Arts Gallery
- 2020 - "Rosalyne" (photographs), presented at Orlando, McEvoy Foundation, San Francisco, California
- 2020 - "Icons" (photographs), presented at Baltimore Museum of Art, Baltimore, Maryland

== Filmography ==
=== Film and video art ===
Year	Film and video art	Role	Type	Citation
2008	Fish	Actress		
2008	You Will Never Be a Woman			collaboration with Van Barnes, Mariah Garnett, and A.L. Steiner
2009	P.I.G.	Actress	multimedia performance and film	collaboration with Rhys Ernst.
2010	Lost Lake	Actress	short film	collaboration with Van Barnes
2011	At Least You Know You Exist	Director	short film	
2012	She Gone Rogue	Actress, Writer & Producer	short film	
2015	Southern For Pussy	Director, Writer & Actress	short film	
2017	Time Marches Forward & So Do We		short documentary video	
2020	Disclosure: Trans Lives on Screen	Herself	documentary film	
2022	Framing Agnes	Agnes	documentary film	
2022	Biosphere	Producer	feature film	
2023	The Stroll	Director	feature film	
2023	Queenmaker: The Making of an It Girl	Director	Hulu documentary	
2025	Enigma	Director	feature film	

=== Television ===
Year	Television	Role	Citation
2006	Artstar	Herself	
2014–2016	Transparent	Producer, Actress/Herself	
2015	This is me (documentary)	Producer, Actress/Herself	
2015–2016	I am Cait	Actress/Herself	
2021	The Lady and the Dale	Director; executive producer	

=== Performance ===
Year	Title	Role	Location	Notes
2015	Bring Your Own Body: the Story of Lynn Harris	Artist	Cooper Union, New York City, New York	A multimedia performance featuring paint, sculpture, textiles, film, digital collage, and performance.

== See also ==
- List of transgender film and television directors
