= Geraldine Elizabeth Carmichael =

American automobile executive and fraudster

- Carmichael, 1974 or 1975, with a model of the Dale automobile
- Born: Jerome Dean Michael; 1927; Indiana, U.S.
- Died: February 2004 (aged 76–77)
- Other names: Katherine Elizabeth Johnson; Liz Charmichael; Susan Raines
- Occupations: Counterfeiter; thief; fraudster; corporate securities violator
- Known for: Twentieth Century Motor Car Corporation
- Criminal charges: Conspiracy; grand theft; fraud
- Spouses: Marga (div. 1954) Juanita Ledbetter (m. 1954–1957) Betty Sweets (m. 1958–1959) Vivian Barrett (m. 1959–1976)
- Children: 10

Geraldine Elizabeth Carmichael (1927 – February 2004) was an American automobile executive and convicted fraudster. During the 1970s energy crisis, Carmichael promoted a prototype for a low-cost fuel-efficient car via Twentieth Century Motor Car Corporation, which was never produced. The company would ultimately prove to be fraudulent and was only in existence for four years. Charmichael fled with investor money. She was captured in 1989, and served 18 months on fraud charges.

In the 1960s, Carmichael changed her name to Liz Carmichael and came out as a transgender woman to her family.

== Early life ==
Geraldine Elizabeth Carmichael was born in 1927, as Jerome Dean Michael, and was known as such until the late 1960s. She grew up in Jasonville, Indiana, later moving to Detroit, Michigan with her family.

She served in the United States Army and was stationed in Germany for a time period.

== Career and legal issues ==
Early on, Carmichael worked as a door-to-door salesman and a newspaper publisher. She was reportedly arrested multiple times and fired for her schemes. In 1961, she was arrested for counterfeiting U.S. currency in the Los Angeles, California area. She jumped bail and went on the run in 1962 with her wife, Vivian Barrett, and their children. The family moved constantly, never living in an area for more than a few months. They changed identities using stolen records and would only home-school the children.

While on the run, Carmichael drove her car into a tree and shot it, in an effort to fake "Jerry's" death. She changed her name to Liz Carmichael in the late 1960s and would often introduce Barrett as her secretary.

=== Twentieth Century Motor Car Coporation ===
In 1973, still on the run from her 1961 arrest, Carmichael was working at the United States Marketing Institute (USMI), in Los Angeles. There she met Dale Clifft, who had invented a three-wheeled car with low fuel consumption.

In August 1974, she and Clifft left the USMI to form the Twentieth Century Motor Car Corporation, named for her favorite book, Atlas Shrugged by Ayn Rand. The company's main product, the Dale car, was widely covered in the press, with its claim of 70 miles per gallon coming at the time of the Arab oil embargo. The Dale was also marketed as high-tech, lightweight, and safer than any existing car at the time. Other features included impact-resistant windows and a body that would not dent or shatter for just $2,000. At one point, she claimed that she had driven the car into a wall at 50 mph will no ill effects to herself or the car. Carmichael touted the companies goal to disrupt their competitors General Motors and Ford.

Carmichael served as president of the company in Encino, California. Appearing in multiple outlets, Carmichael claimed to be a widowed mother of five, with her husband "Jim" that had supposedly died in 1966. She also claimed to hold degrees in mechanical engineering and business from Ohio State University and Miami University, respectively.

The company received a number of investors, pre-orders, and offers for franchises. Carmichael announced that 88,000 Dales would be produced in the first year, with a 150,000 square foot plant opening in Burbank, California and 100 employees already working. Later, a postal inspector would investigate this claim and find an empty hanger with no assembly line. Despite promising two other vechicles - the Revelle and the Venagen - to investors, only three Dale prototypes were ever made. The presented prototypes were not in any working conditions.

Rumors of fraud emerged, followed by investigations by a TV reporter and some newspapers - Dick Carlson leading the journalistic investigations. The California Department of Corporations began an investigation and in the fall of 1974, sent a cease and desist to the company to stop selling stock. Carmichael would ignore the notice and move the company to Dallas, Texas in January 1975, however the company remained under investigation. Investigations would uncover receipts for $2 million in orders for cars that were never built and estimated that over 5,000 customers had been scammed. Company officials were arrested that February and Carmichael went on the run.

The police would raid her home and discover a pleathora of wigs and padded bras. The authorities contacted Carmichael's brother-in-law, who confirmed her trans identity. Using fingerprints, they connected Carmichael back to her charges from 1961, under the name "Jerry Dean Michael," that she was still wanted for. She was eventually tracked down and arrested in Miami, Florida, where she was living under the name Susan Raines. She once again attempted to run, but was captured. Carmichael was extradited back to California and was charged with 31 counts of grand theft, fraud, conspiracy to commit theft of over $10,000 and corporate securities violations.

Carmichael opted to represent herself in court, claiming that the product would be successful with more time. In 1977, Carmichael was found guilty on 26 counts, having defrauded customers and investors of $1 to $3 million. She was sentenced to 2 to 20 years in prison. A local television station posted Carmichael's $50,000 bail in exchange for her story, while she appealed her conviction.

=== Fugative life and capture ===
After her final appeal was rejected in 1980 and she was still out on bail, Carmichael fled with her five children. She went into hiding, and was featured in a 1989 episode of Unsolved Mysteries, which detailed the fraud behind the Dale, for which she was a wanted fugitive.

Roughly two weeks after the episode aired, a tip from a viewer led police to Dale, Texas, where Carmichael was eventually found working at a flower shop in Bastrop under the alias Katherine Elizabeth Johnson. She was arrested in April 1989 and extradited to California. She served two and one-half years in the Los Angeles Men's Central Jail, despite having been recognized as a woman by the courts.

She was released and lived in an undisclosed location for years.

== Personal life ==
According to the Federal Bureau of Investigation, Carmichael married four times. She was charged with desertion for leaving her first wife, Marga, whom she met while stationed in Germany, and their two children. In 1954, she married a woman named Juanita, with whom she had two children before their relationship ended in 1956. In 1958, she married a woman named Betty Sweets after knowing her for four weeks. They conceived a daughter, but the marriage ended within a year.

In 1959, she married Vivian Barrett Michael, her fourth wife, and together they had five children; Brian, Candi, Wendy, Shawn, and Michael. The two separated briefly when Carmichael came out as transgender, however reunited and stayed together for another decade. They would finally divorce during Carmichael's 1976 trial, but remained close friends until Barrett's death.

Carmichael died of cancer in February 2004.

=== Transition ===
Carmichael began her gender transitioning in the 1960s. Due to being on the run, Carmichael would self-administer her own hormone injections. She would obtain these medications from veterinarians. In 1969, she traveled to Mexico for a breast augmentation surgery. In 1989, Carmichael was sentenced to serve time in a men's jail, despite courts addressing her as female. District Attorney Robert Youngdahl justified this decision with his claim that Carmichael had not completed a sex change surgery.

== In popular culture ==
On January 31, 2021, HBO premiered a four-part documentary, The Lady and the Dale, directed by Nick Cammilleri and Zackary Drucker. The documentary was described by the Wall Street Journal as "... a lot of stories—about fraud, flight, FBI manhunts, transgender politics, selective prosecution, bias in the media, and corruption in the courts."

Carmichael, in more modern times, has been compared to convicted businesswoman Elizabeth Holmes by media outlets and investigators. Comparisons have been made of Carmichael's promises on the Dale car to Holmes' company Thernaos. Founded in 2003, Thernaos valuation soared in the early 2010s after it claimed to have revolutionized blood testing by developing methods that needed only very small volumes of blood, such as from a fingerprick. In 2018, the company was investigated on fraud charges with Holmes being charged and sentenced. Carmichael's charisma, demeanour, and claims have been closely compared to Holmes.
