= Abigail DeVille =

American artist (born 1981)

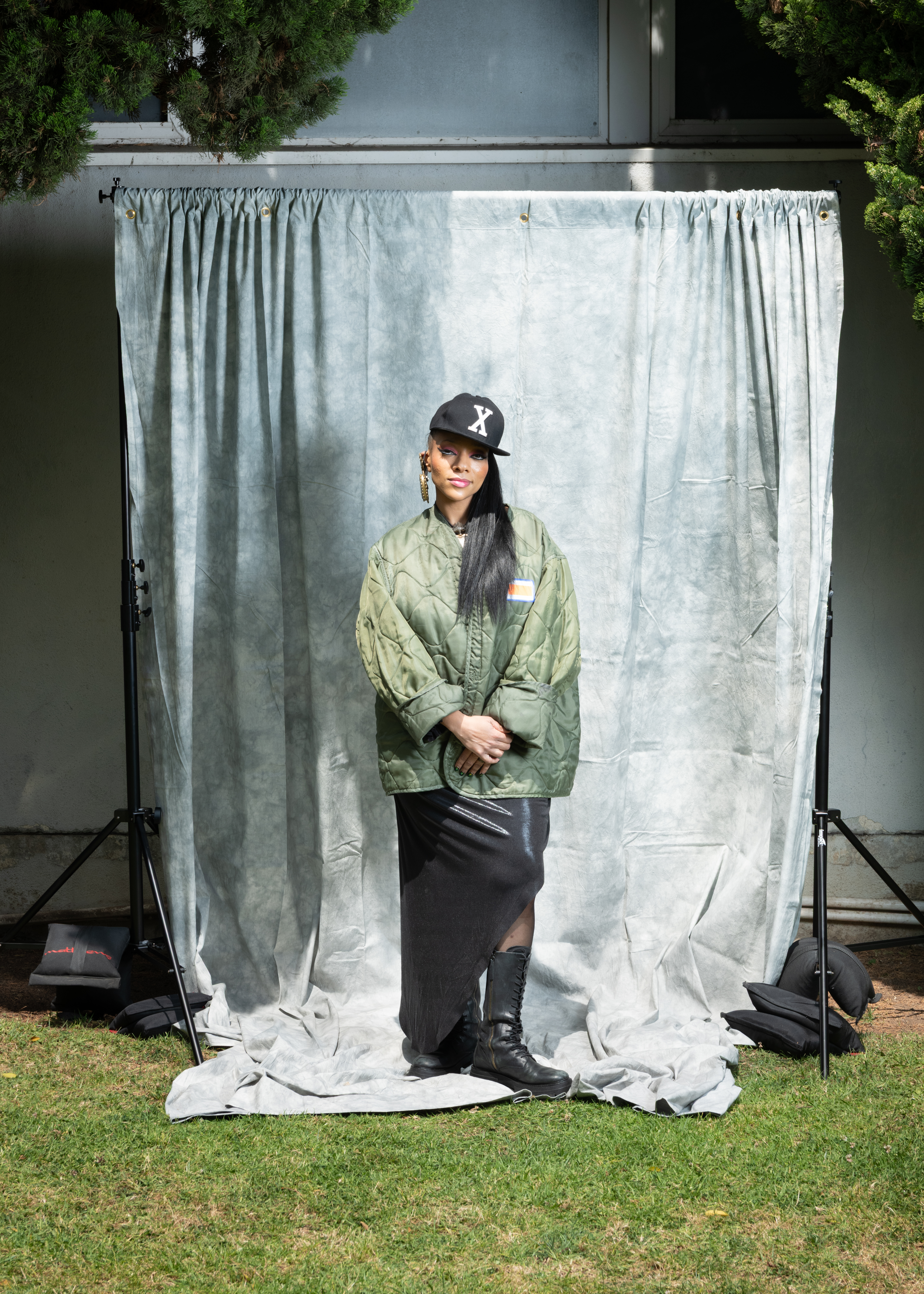
- Born: 1981 (age 44–45); New York City, New York, U.S.
- Education: Pratt Institute; Skowhegan School of Painting and Sculpture; Fashion Institute of Technology; Yale University
- Occupations: Artist, sculptor
- Known for: Large sculptures and installations
- Website: abigaildeville.com

Abigail DeVille (born 1981) is an American artist who creates large sculptures and installations, often incorporating found materials from the neighborhoods around the exhibition venues. DeVille's sculptures and installations often focus on themes of the history of racist violence, gentrification, and lost regional history. Her work often involves a performance element that brings the artwork out of its exhibition space and into the streets; DeVille has organized these public events, which she calls "processionals," in several U.S. cities, including Washington, D.C., Baltimore, and New York. DeVille likes to use her own family as inspiration for her artwork. She decided to use her grandmother as inspiration because of her vibrant personality, to help her articulate ideas from the neighborhoods of the Bronx. DeVille is pleased that her art works are unique, as many people see trash as useless to them, while DeVille instead sees an opportunity.

== Early life and education ==
DeVille was born in New York and lives and works in the Bronx, New York. DeVille tries to direct attention to historical realities that are largely unknown; she tries to illuminate truths, which people give little care or thought to, from the history of a group of people seen through the light of violence. She attended the High School of Art & Design (1999) and the Cooper Union Saturday Program. DeVille teaches at the Maryland Institute College of Art. She earned a B.F.A. from the Fashion Institute of Technology (2007) and an M.F.A. from Yale University (2011) and studied at Pratt Institute (2000) and the Skowhegan School of Painting and Sculpture (2007). She has held residencies at the Studio Museum in Harlem (2013–2014) and the International Studio and Curatorial Program, Brooklyn (2012).

DeVille took part in the reality television series Artstar (2006), the first art-based reality show.

== Awards ==
DeVille has received awards from the Joan Mitchell Foundation (2012), the Edward and Sally Van Lier Fund of The New York Community Trust (2012), and Creative Capital (2015). In 2015, she also received the Obie Award for design for her work as a scenic and costume designer on Prophetika: An Oratorio, a production at La Mama Experimental Theatre Club. In 2016, she was awarded a Rome Prize of the American Academy in Rome (for 2017–2018).
