= Ed Struiksma =

American politician (born 1946)

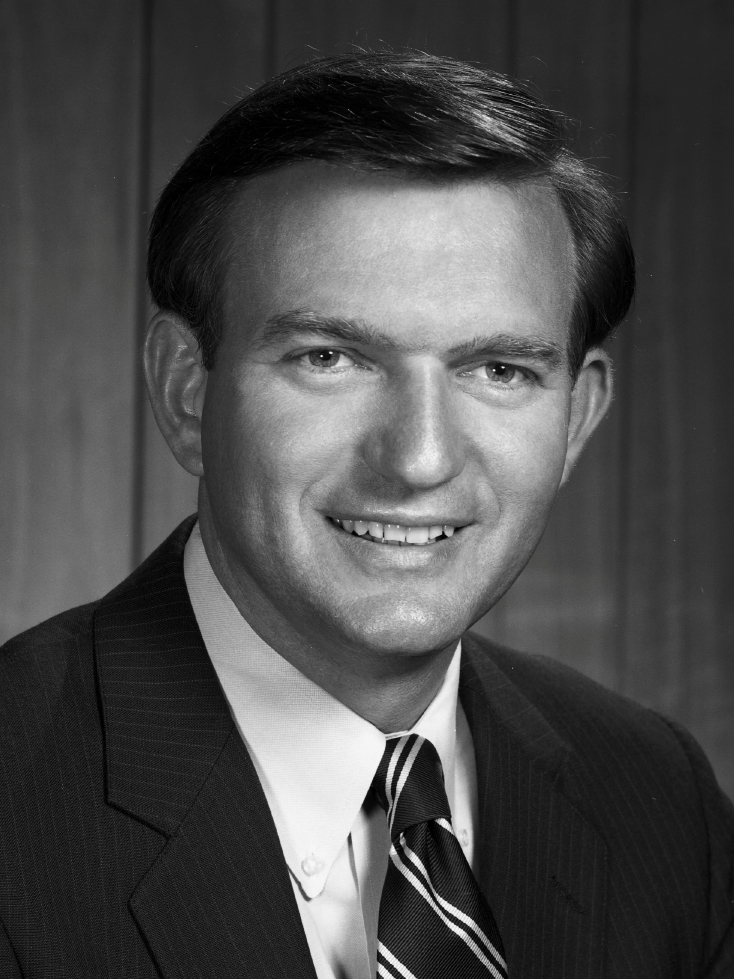
- Official portrait, 1981

Member of San Diego City Council representing the 5th District
- In office 1981–1989
- Preceded by: Linda Bernhardt
- Succeeded by: Fred Shnaubelt

Acting Mayor of San Diego
- In office December 5, 1985 – June 3, 1986
- Preceded by: Roger Hedgecock
- Succeeded by: Maureen O'Connor

Personal details
- Born: Edward John Struiksma; 1946 (age 79–80) San Diego, California, US
- Party: Republican
- Spouse: Jean Struiksma
- Profession: Marine, police officer

Edward John Struiksma (born 1946) is an American Republican politician from California. He served two terms on the San Diego City Council representing District 5. He served as acting mayor of San Diego after the resignation of Roger Hedgecock until the special election of Maureen O'Connor.

Prior to elected office, Struiksma served in the Vietnam War as a member of the United States Marine Corps. After leaving the Marines, he worked as a police officer for the City of San Diego for nine years.

Political offices
Preceded by Roger Hedgecock	Mayor of San Diego, California (acting); 1985–1986	Succeeded by Maureen O'Connor
