= Dale, Texas =

- Unincorporated community
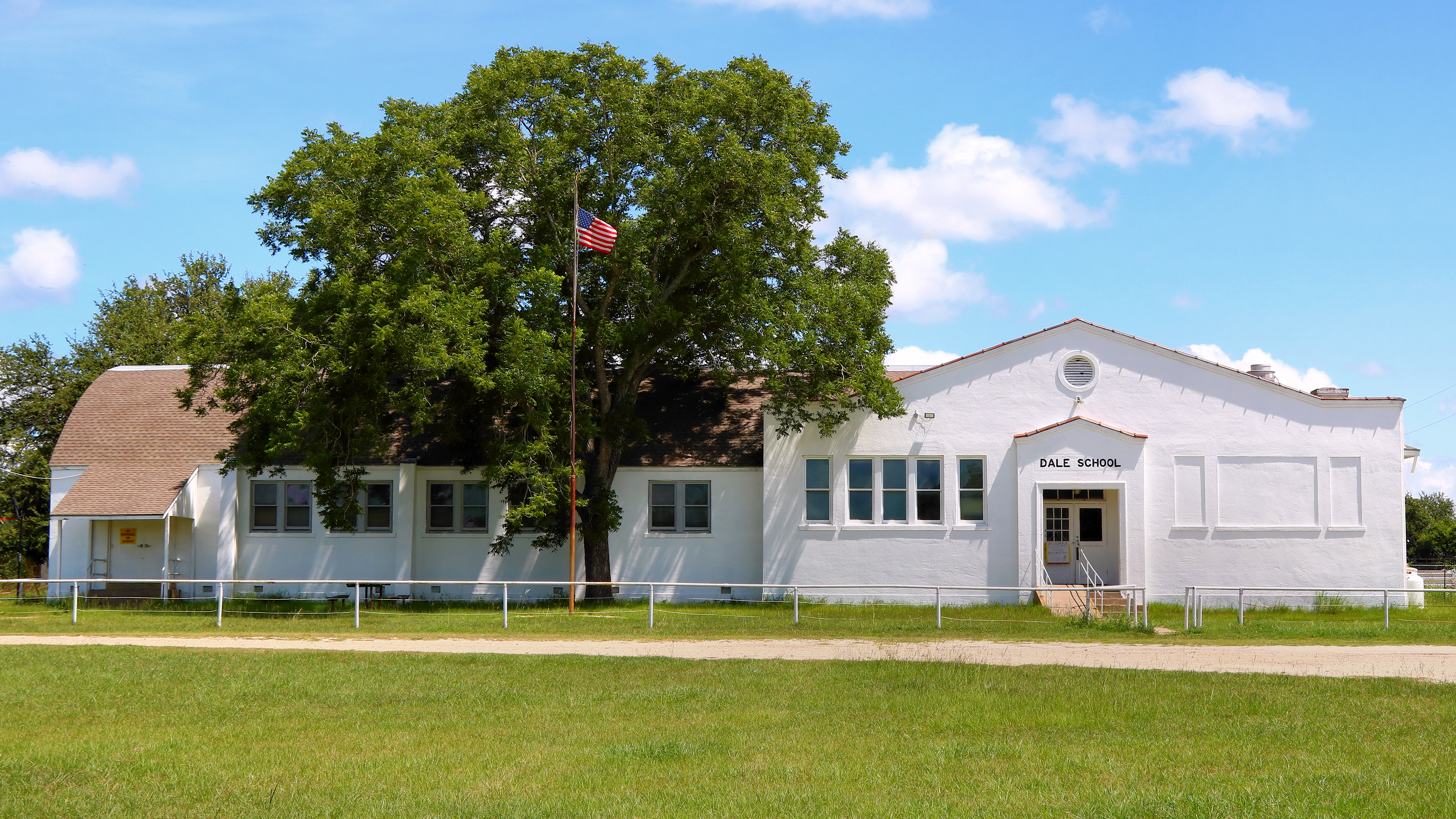
- The Dale Community Center

- Location within Texas Location within the United States
- Coordinates: 29°55′39″N 97°33′52″W
- Country: United States
- State: Texas
- County: Caldwell
- Elevation: 522 ft (159 m)
- Time zone: UTC-6 (Central (CST))
  - Summer (DST): UTC-5 (CDT)
- Area codes: 512 & 737
- GNIS feature ID: 1333879

Dale is an unincorporated community in Caldwell County, Texas, United States. The settlement had a population of 500 in 2000. It is located within the Greater Austin metropolitan area.

== History ==
The population was 126 in 2010.

Although it is unincorporated, Dale has a post office, with the ZIP code of 78616.

== Geography ==
Dale is located along Farm to Market Road 1854, approximately 7 mi (11 km) northeast of Lockhart in north-central Caldwell County. It is also located 16 mi (26 km) southwest of Bastrop and 32 mi (51 km) southeast of Austin.

== Education ==
Today the community is served by the Lockhart Independent School District.

== Notable people ==
- Geraldine Elizabeth Carmichael was arrested in Dale. She had been on the run after defrauding many people who had wanted to purchase a small fuel-efficient car that had never begun production.
- Abram Lincoln Harris, economist, academic, anthropologist.
- Azie Taylor Morton, the only African American to serve as Treasurer of the United States.
- Jimmy Weldon, entertainer.
