= Roger Hedgecock =

American mayor and talk radio host (born 1946)

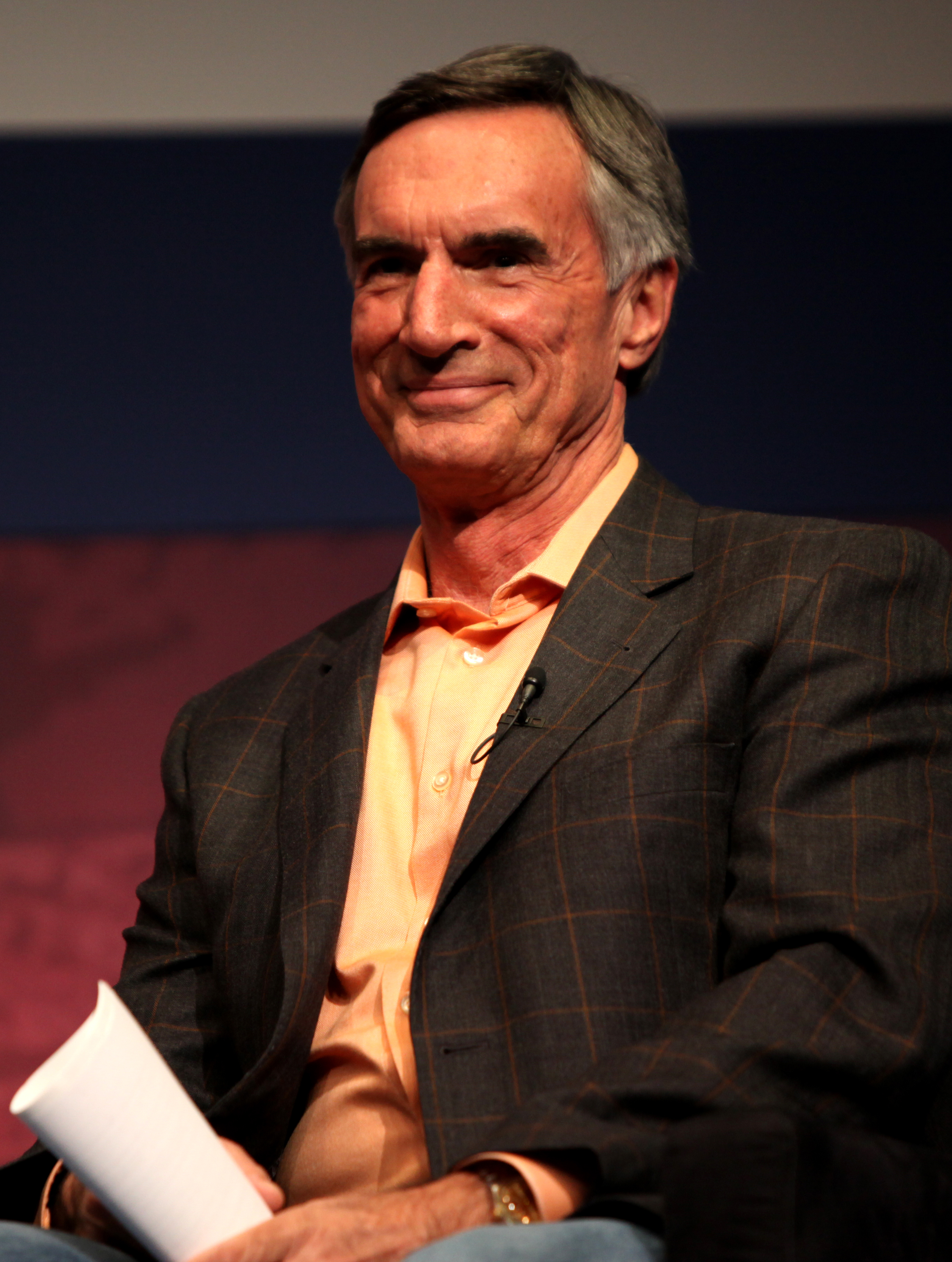

30th Mayor of San Diego
- In office May 3, 1983 – December 5, 1985
- Preceded by: Bill Cleator (acting)
- Succeeded by: Ed Struiksma (acting)

Personal details
- Born: Roger Allan Hedgecock; May 2, 1946 (age 80) Compton, California, U.S.
- Party: Republican
- Spouse: Cindy Hedgecock
- Children: 2
- Education: UC Santa Barbara; UC Hastings College of Law
- Profession: Radio talk show host, politician
- Website: www.rogerhedgecock.com

Roger Allan Hedgecock (born May 2, 1946) is an American politician and conservative talk radio host, who served as 30th mayor of San Diego between May 1983 and December 1985. His show is syndicated by Radio America.

== Early life and education ==
He graduated from the Roman Catholic-affiliated St. Augustine High School. He received a bachelor's degree from University of California, Santa Barbara in 1968 and a Juris Doctor degree from University of California, Hastings College of the Law in 1971. In 1970, he was an intern for the president of the Sierra Club.

Hedgecock was not qualified for military service during the Vietnam War for medical reasons: his severe acne caused him to be rated first 1-Y and then 4-F.

== Political career ==
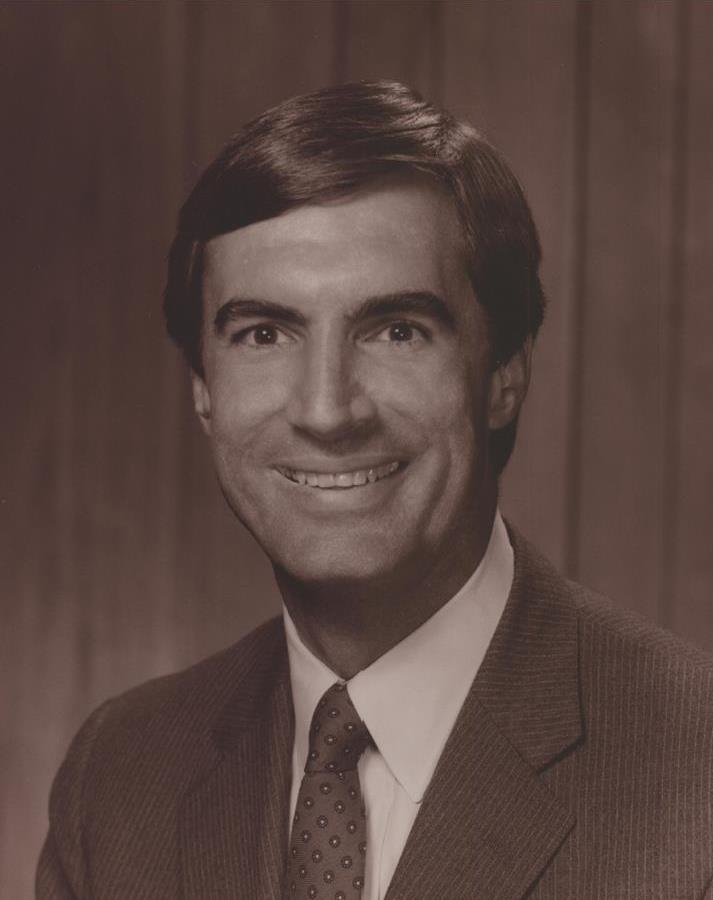
Hedgecock during his tenure as mayor of San Diego

Hedgecock became politically active at an early age, volunteering to work in US Senator Barry Goldwater's 1964 presidential campaign. In 1976, he was elected to the San Diego County Board of Supervisors and served until 1983.

In 1983 he was elected mayor of San Diego. Although San Diego municipal elections are "non-partisan" (party affiliation is not listed on the ballot), Hedgecock ran as a "progressive" Republican. He campaigned to stop the "Los Angelization" of San Diego, a term in San Diego that is synonymous with the uncontrolled urban and suburban development, overcrowding and pollution of Los Angeles.

In 1985, Hedgecock was charged with felonies related to receiving over $350,000 in illegal campaign funds and was forced from office because of the scandal. The key players, including Hedgecock and his associates, admitted in sworn statements that they knowingly and willingly broke the law when they conspired to funnel money from a wealthy financier into Hedgecock's 1983 mayoral campaign fund. Though Hedgecock claimed none of it was true, he pleaded guilty to one count of conspiracy and was found guilty of 12 counts of perjury, related to the alleged failure to report all campaign contributions. Since California, like most other states, does not allow convicted felons to hold elected office, Hedgecock resigned on December 5 of that year. His first trial ended in a mistrial with a hung jury after the jury deadlocked 11–1 in favor of conviction. However, two of the 12 jurors in the first trial submitted sworn statements that the jury bailiff, Al Burroughs, provided them with alcohol and tried to pressure them into finding Hedgecock guilty. State prosecutors investigated the possibility of criminal jury tampering. As part of the investigation, Burroughs admitted trying to influence the verdict. Under California superior court rules, any attempt on a bailiff's part to influence a verdict is serious misconduct that can be grounds for reversal. However, prosecutors refused to release transcripts of their investigation interviews to Hedgecock's attorneys.

A San Diego appellate court ruled in 1988 that the judge presiding over the second trial, who had announced from the bench that he believed Hedgecock was guilty, was wrong to block release of the transcripts to the defendant. Hedgecock was denied access to the documents for two more years until he appealed to the California Supreme Court, which ordered the transcripts released. In that appeal, the Supreme Court threw out 12 perjury convictions and set aside the remaining conspiracy charge pending a hearing on Hedgecock's motion for a jury trial on grounds of jury tampering.

The defense obtained the transcripts in October 1990. The following month, Hedgecock reached a plea deal with prosecutors of one count of conspiracy in return for no prison time and no retrial. As part of the deal, a judge reduced the felony to a misdemeanor and dismissed the case on December 31, 1990.

== Radio and television career ==
With the controversy ending his political career, Hedgecock accepted a job as a talk show host on San Diego's AM 1130 KSDO, where he remained until moving to KOGO AM 600 in 1997. He started four days after resigning from the mayoralty, with his first show on January 20, 1986. His show aired from 9 a.m. to 12 noon. Several years later, Hedgecock's time slot moved to 12 noon to 3 p.m., to make room for The Rush Limbaugh Show in the schedule. His show eventually moved to the 3 p.m. to 6 p.m. time slot.

Beginning in November 2007, Hedgecock hosted a nationally syndicated radio talk show on Saturdays from 9:00 a.m. to 12 p.m., Pacific Time, the flagship station being KOGO. On January 5, 2009, his show began being syndicated nationwide by Radio America. Originally, the plan was for the fourth hour of the show to continue only on KOGO and continue the discussion of topics relevant to the local San Diego/Southern California audience, but KOGO later decided to drop the fourth hour altogether, thus bringing to an end the Community Forum, which had been his focus since the show's inception in 1986.

In November 2011, it was announced that Hedgecock would be leaving his local flagship station, KOGO, and would move his nationally syndicated show to a new flagship home, radio station AM 760 KFMB, San Diego's CBS radio and television network affiliate. His weekday 3 p.m. to 6 p.m. Pacific Time broadcast debuted there on January 2, 2012. The show's format continues to focus on political and social topics from a conservative point of view.

He has done simulcasts with talk hosts from other areas of the country, such as Lars Larson of AM 750 KXL in Portland, Oregon, and he often does transatlantic simulcasts with James Whale, on UK station, Talksport.

Until October 2007, he was also a frequent guest host for The Rush Limbaugh Show, also nationally syndicated. Hedgecock was not invited again to guest host for Limbaugh after that time, according to Hedgecock's producer of 15 years, because Limbaugh became angry when Hedgecock started a syndicated radio program on Saturdays without first informing Limbaugh.

To do his show, Hedgecock receives over $300,000 per year from Radio America, a division of the tax-exempt American Studies Center, based in Arlington, Virginia. Hedgecock also hosts a cable television program at U-T TV, run by Republican donor Doug Manchester.

Hedgecock appeared as a guest on HBO's Real Time With Bill Maher in September 2012 and was joined on the panel by MSNBC’s Chris Matthews and Time magazine reporter Rana Foroohar.

On February 23, 2015, during the opening of his radio program, Hedgecock announced that he would be leaving his show on March 27, 2015. He made clear he would continue to do correspondence and interviews, but it would be the end of his radio show that he started in 1986, "before Rush and before Hannity," when people told him that talking politics on the radio was taboo.

== Controversies ==
In 1994, Hedgecock organized a group of protesters calling themselves "The Normal People". They applied to march in the Pride parade “in political disagreement to the homosexual agenda.” When rejected by the organizers of the parade, Hedgecock filed a lawsuit, arguing that their exclusion violated San Diego's "Human Dignity Ordinance." The Superior Court rejected their claim, arguing that their right to march was not protected under the ordinance, since the parade was a private event and the "Normal People" message was intended to interfere with the event.

Hedgecock drew the attention of civil rights groups in 2006 when he invited white nationalists and other extremists to an anti-immigrant conference that he organized. He also was criticized for inviting one of the white nationalists, Peter Brimelow, onto a radio program Hedgecock hosted in 2008.

== Lawsuit against the City of San Diego ==
In April 2017, Hedgecock sued the City of San Diego for "the loss of support, service, love, companionship, society, affection, relations and solace from his wife" (according to court records) after his wife broke her breast implants when she tripped on a public street; the lawsuit alleges that the sidewalk was uneven due to a nearby tree, causing Hedgecock's wife to fall.

== Other endeavors ==
In his early years, Hedgecock was an entrepreneur and worked in music concert promotions. One notable co-production of his was the 1969 Mother's Day concert at Aztec Bowl (now the site of Viejas Arena, San Diego State University). Performers included Canned Heat, Grateful Dead, and Santana. Security was provided by the local Hells Angels motorcycle club to whom Hedgecock paid a signing bonus of a case of Jack Daniel's.

In 1986 he formed a band with well-known San Diego journalist Thomas K. Arnold called The Arnold-Hedgecock Experience. Arnold was a writer for the San Diego Reader, San Diego Magazine, the Los Angeles Times and numerous other publications; in the early 1980s he also engineered 1960s pop star Gary Puckett's comeback. They recorded a cover of "Louie, Louie" and donated proceeds to St. Vincent de Paul, a local charity; they played several concerts around town, including opening for The Kingsmen in Oceanside in front of 10,000 people. Arnold is currently the publisher and editorial director of Media Play News, one of five Hollywood trades and the only one dedicated to the home entertainment sector.

== Personal life ==
He resides in San Diego. Since 2016, Hedgecock and his wife Cindy Hedgecock also own a 10-acre apple orchard in Julian, California, a mountain town east of San Diego. They have two sons.

== Published works ==
- Roger Hedgecock and Francine Phillips, If We Say it Enough We'll Believe It (1992)
- Roger Hedgecock and Francine Phillips, Fight City Hall and Win (1993)

Political offices
Preceded by Bill Cleator (acting)	Mayor of San Diego, California; 1983—1985	Succeeded by Ed Struiksma (acting)
