= Maureen O'Connor (California politician) =

Former mayor of San Diego (born 1946)

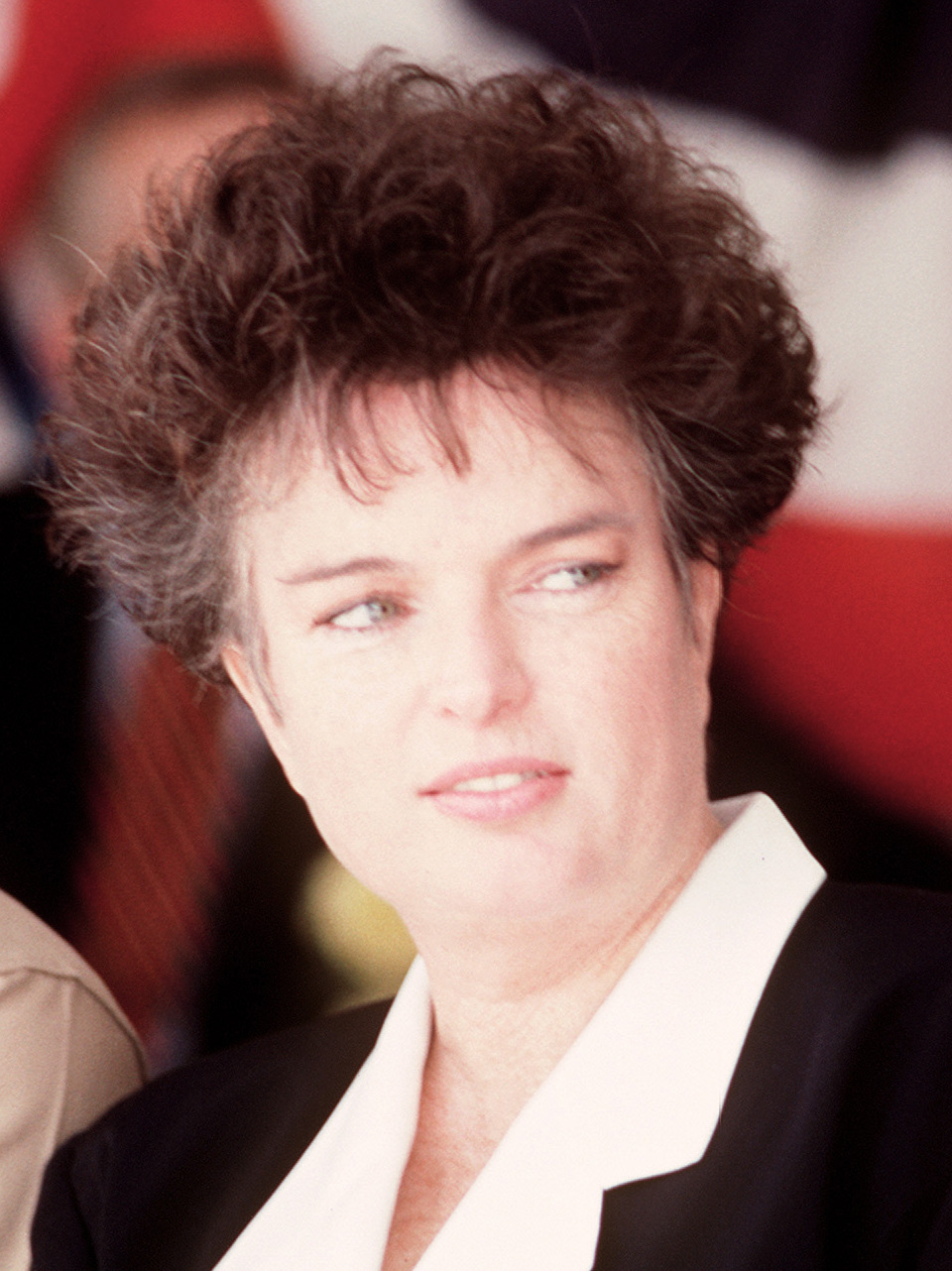
- O'Connor in 1991

31st Mayor of San Diego
- In office June 3, 1986 – December 7, 1992
- Preceded by: Ed Struiksma (acting)
- Succeeded by: Susan Golding

Personal details
- Born: July 14, 1946 (age 80) San Diego, California, U.S.
- Party: Democratic
- Spouse: Robert O. Peterson (m. 1977; died 1994)
- Education: San Diego State University

Maureen Frances O'Connor (born July 14, 1946) is an American politician who served as the 31st and first female mayor of San Diego from 1986 to 1992. A member of the Democratic Party, she was the youngest person ever to be elected to the San Diego City Council and the first woman to serve as mayor of San Diego.

In 2013, federal prosecutors charged her with money laundering, but deferred prosecution based on her agreement to pay back the funds involved. The charges were formally dismissed on February 24, 2015.

== Early life ==
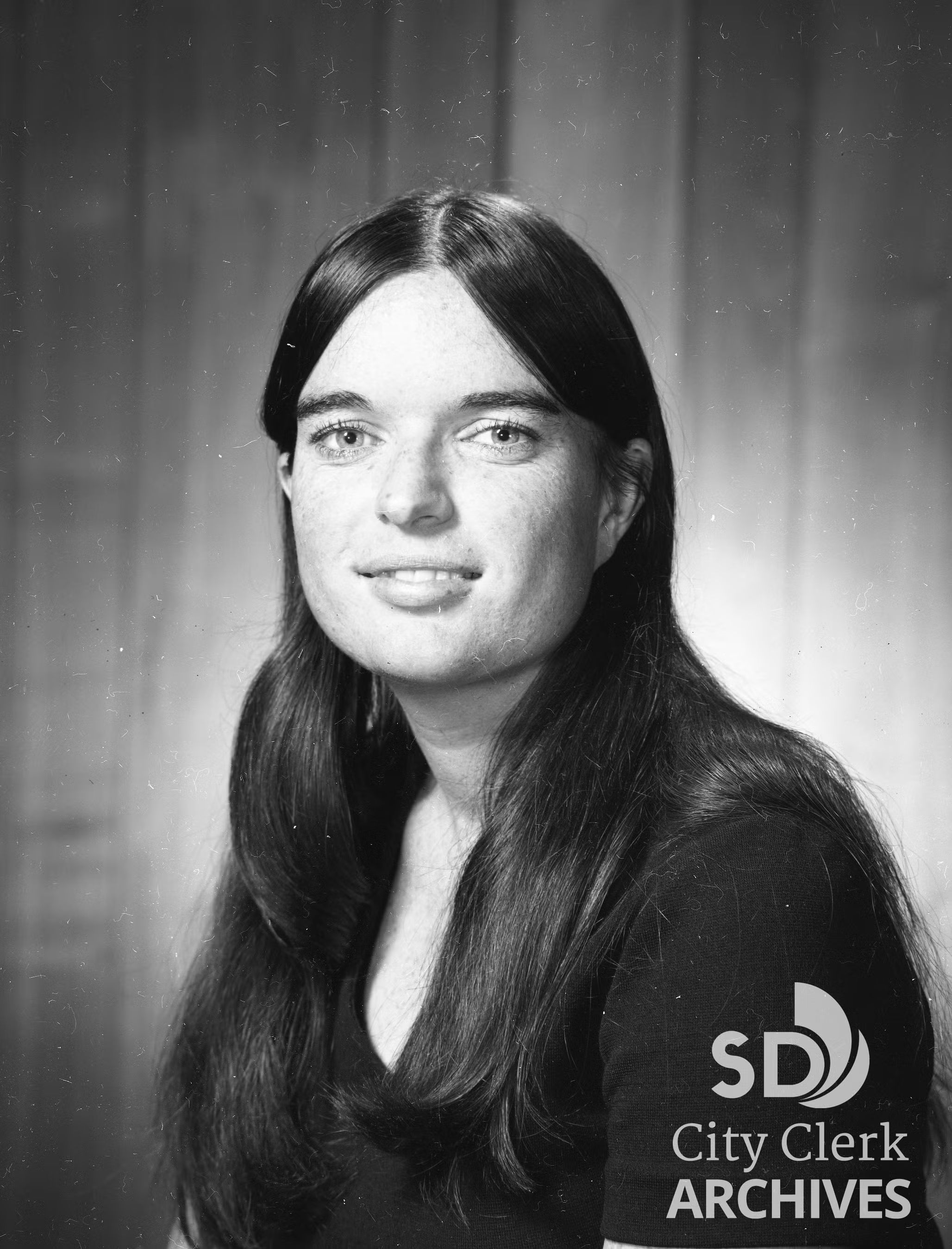
In 1971, O'Connor became the youngest person elected to the San Diego City Council.

Maureen O'Connor was born in 1946 in San Diego, California. She was one of 13 children, including a twin named Mavourneen who later became her campaign manager. Her Irish-American parents were Jerome O'Connor, formerly a local boxer known as "Kid Jerome" who later owned a liquor store in Point Loma, and Frances Shinnick O'Connor a nurse from Fargo, North Dakota, who was named "Mother of the Year" by Parade magazine in 1956.

The O'Connors moved to the Mission Hills neighborhood when Bishop Charles F. Buddy was looking for a "good Catholic family" to move into his mansion when he moved to the University of San Diego; but they only lived there for one year. All seven O'Connor daughters competed as precision swimmers, together winning more than 1000 team and individual medals and trophies.

In 1961, one of her brothers was stabbed by an employee at the Campus Drive-in movie theater in Rolando who was eventually convicted of involuntary manslaughter. The family unsuccessfully sued the Campus company and her father became locally famous as the president of the San Diego Court Watchers Association.

O'Connor graduated from San Diego State University in 1970 with a Bachelor's degree in Psychology. After graduation, O'Connor was a physical education teacher and counselor for Rosary High School . She became inspired to enter politics after seeing Indians being treated poorly at a bicentennial celebration for the city and a City Hall taxicab scandal.

== Political career ==
In 1971, O'Connor became the youngest member elected to the San Diego City Council at age 25 and served to 1979. O'Connor was commissioner for the Port of San Diego from 1980–1985.

In 1983, she ran for mayor against Roger Hedgecock, but lost the race amid criticism that she and her millionaire husband attempted to buy the election after spending $560,000 of their own money. O'Connor ran again and won in 1985 after Hedgecock resigned over a political corruption scandal. O'Connor was San Diego's first female mayor, and the first Democrat to hold the office since 1971. She served two terms.

Her nickname was "Mayor Mo" among her supporters. Former councilman (and future city mayor) Bob Filner accused her of avoiding debate and "bullying people, one issue at a time." Others charged that she avoided difficult issues and concentrated on her "'populist' appeal that [is] . . . 'a mile wide and an inch deep.'"

In 2000, during the 2000–2001 California electricity crisis, she joined consumer activists like Ralph Nader in decrying the notoriously destructive effects of utility deregulation on California.

In 1987, she was the first mayor of San Diego to march in the San Diego Pride Parade, alongside the mother of an AIDS patient. She was fulfilling a campaign promise to the LGBT community. She was cheered and booed. She said she was not condoning or condemning anyone, just showing support.

In 1988, as mayor, O'Connor spent 36 hours posing undercover as a homeless person, under the watchful eye of two plainclothes San Diego police officers. A nun recognized her and whispered to her that "if you want to conceal your identity, you should remember that homeless women don't read the financial pages."

== Personal life ==
O'Connor met her future husband Robert O. Peterson, founder of the Jack in the Box fast food chain, while first running for city council. They were married in 1977 in Europe. They lived in a Japanese-style mansion in the La Playa area of Point Loma designed by architects Russell Forester and Kenneth Hayashi. Although a Republican, he supported her in her political campaigns. He filed for divorce in 1985 but they soon reconciled. Peterson died in 1994. They had no children.

=== 2013 money laundering charges ===
In February 2013, O'Connor was charged in federal court with money laundering. Under an agreement with prosecutors, prosecution was deferred, contingent on her repaying $2 million which she allegedly took from a nonprofit foundation she managed, the R. P. Foundation, created by her late husband Robert O. Peterson. The fund is reported to be virtually defunct, its sole assets being $2 million owed to it by unspecified foundation insiders. Prosecutors said her gambling activity exceeded $1 billion over the period 2000–2008, with net losses of around $13 million, leaving her "destitute".

O'Connor attributed her behavior to a gambling addiction aggravated by a brain tumor, for which she had surgery in 2011.

Political offices
Preceded by Ed Struiksma (acting)	Mayor of San Diego, California; 1986—1992	Succeeded by Susan Golding
