= 2024 San Diego elections =

2024 San Diego City Council election
- November 5, 2024

5 of the 9 seats on the San Diego City Council
	Majority party
Party	Democratic
Seats before	9
Seats after	9
Seat change	Steady
Council President before election
Sean Elo-Rivera
Democratic
Elected Council President
Joe LaCava
Democratic

Municipal elections were held in San Diego in 2024 for mayor, city attorney, and city council. The primary election occurred Tuesday, March 5, 2024, and the general election occurred Tuesday, November 5, 2024.

Five of the nine city council seats were up for election, with all five incumbents winning re-election. A special election was also held at the time of the primary to fill the District 4 seat vacated by Monica Montgomery Steppe, who had resigned following her election to the San Diego County Board of Supervisors in 2023.

Municipal elections in California are officially non-partisan, although most members do identify a party preference. A two-round system is used for the elections, starting with primaries in March followed by runoff elections in November between the top-two candidates in each race.

== Mayor ==
Incumbent Todd Gloria, a Democrat, and Larry Turner, an independent, defeated three other candidates and advanced from the primary on March 5, 2024. Gloria went on to defeat Turner in the general election.

2024 San Diego mayoral election
Primary election
Party	Candidate	Votes	%
Democratic	Todd Gloria (incumbent)	132,055	50.0
Independent	Larry Turner	60,931	23.1
Democratic	Geneviéve Jones-Wright	42,196	16.0
Republican	Jane Glasson	18,990	7.2
Democratic	Dan Smiechowski	9,973	3.8
Total votes		264,145	100.0
General election
Democratic	Todd Gloria	301,923	55.4
Independent	Larry Turner	243,467	44.6
Total votes		545,390	100.0
Democratic hold			

== City Attorney ==
Incumbent city attorney Mara Elliott was ineligible for re-election due to term limits. Chief Deputy City Attorney Heather Ferbert and California state assemblymember Brian Maienschein advanced from the March primary with 53.2% and 46.8% of the vote, respectively. Ferbert went on to defeat Maeinschein in the general election.

2024 San Diego city attorney election
Primary election
Party	Candidate	Votes	%
Democratic	Heather Ferbert	122,894	53.2
Democratic	Brian Maienschein	108,264	46.8
Total votes		231,158	100.0
General election
Democratic	Heather Ferbert	280,368	56.8
Democratic	Brian Maienschein	213,211	43.2
Total votes		493,579	100.0
Democratic hold			

== City Council ==
=== Background ===
Seats in San Diego City Council districts 1, 3, 5, 7, and 9 were up for election. Incumbents Joe LaCava, Stephen Whitburn, Marni von Wilpert, Raul Campillo, and Sean Elo-Rivera ran for re-election. LaCava, von Wilpert and Campillo won re-election unopposed in the March primary, while Whitburn and Elo-Rivera defeated fellow Democratic challengers in the November general election.

Top election issues included homelessness, infrastructure deficits, and housing affordability, part of a broader housing crisis statewide.

=== Results ===
==== District 1 ====
District 1 consisted of the communities of Carmel Valley, Del Mar Heights, Del Mar Mesa, Pacific Highlands Ranch, La Jolla, Torrey Hills, Torrey Pines, University City, and the University of California, San Diego (UCSD) campus.

Incumbent Joe LaCava ran unopposed for re-election and won the election outright in the primary on March 5, 2024.

2024 San Diego City Council District 1 election
Primary election
Party	Candidate	Votes	%
Democratic	Joe LaCava (incumbent)	24,283	100.0
Total votes		24,283	100.0
Democratic hold			

==== District 3 ====
District 3 consisted of the communities of Balboa Park, Bankers Hill/Park West, Downtown, Golden Hill, Hillcrest, Little Italy, Middleton, Mission Hills, North Park, South Park, and University Heights.

Incumbent Stephen Whitburn and Coleen Cusack, both Democrats, defeated two other candidates and advanced from the primary on March 5, 2024. Whitburn went on to defeat Cusack in the general election.

===== Candidates =====
====== Qualified ======
- Stephen Whitburn, San Diego City Councilmember from District 3 (2020–present)
- Coleen Cusack, public interest attorney and community activist
- Kate Callen, writer and community activist
- Ellis T. California Jones III, home energy inspector and ex-felon

====== Endorsements ======
Stephen Whitburn

Organizations

- San Diego County Democratic Party
- San Diego & Imperial Counties Labor Council, AFL–CIO
- San Diego City Firefighters Association, International Association of Fire Fighters Local 145
- San Diego Police Officers Association
- San Diego County Young Democrats
- San Diego Democrats for Equality
- YIMBY Democrats of San Diego

U.S. Representatives

- Scott Peters, U.S. Representative from California's 50th congressional district, 2008 candidate for San Diego City Attorney, and former San Diego City Councilmember from District 1 (2000-2008)
- Sara Jacobs, U.S Representative from California's 51st congressional district

Local politicians

- Nora Vargas, member of the San Diego County Board of Supervisors (2021–present)
- Todd Gloria, 37th mayor of San Diego (2020-Present), former State Assemblymember from the 78th District (2016-2020), former San Diego City Councilmember from District 3 (2008-2016)
- Joe LaCava, San Diego City Councilmember from the District 1 (2020-present)
- Jennifer Campbell, San Diego City Councilmember from District 2 (2018-present), former President of the San Diego City Council (2020-2021)
- Marni von Wilpert, San Diego City Councilmember from District 5 (2020–present)
- Raul Campillo, San Diego City Councilmember from District 7 (2020–present)
Coleen Cusack

Organizations

- California Democratic Renters Council
- Run Women Run
- San Diego Education Association

Newspapers

- San Diego Union-Tribune

Local politicians

- Geneviéve Jones-Wright, 2018 candidate for San Diego County District Attorney and 2024 candidate for mayor of San Diego
Ellis T. California Jones III

Organizations

- San Diego Republican Party

Individuals

- Zack Gianino, President of the San Diego County Young Republicans

2024 San Diego City Council District 3 election
Primary election
Party	Candidate	Votes	%
Democratic	Stephen Whitburn (incumbent)	17,033	52.4
Democratic	Coleen Cusack	6,811	20.9
Democratic	Kate Callen	5,417	16.7
Republican	Ellis T. California Jones III	3,254	10.0
Total votes		32,515	100.0
General election
Democratic	Stephen Whitburn	37,374	58.1
Democratic	Coleen Cusack	26,923	41.9
Total votes		64,297	100.0
Democratic hold			

==== District 4 Special ====
District 4 consisted of the communities of Alta Vista, Broadway Heights, Chollas View, Emerald Hills, Encanto, Greater Skyline Hills, Jamacha, Lincoln Park, Lomita Village, Mountain View, North Bay Terrace, Oak Park, O'Farrell, Paradise Hills, Ridgeview, South Bay Terrace, Valencia Park, and Webster.

Monica Montgomery Steppe, who had represented district 4 since 2018, won election to the San Diego County Board of Supervisors in a special election on November 7, 2023. She resigned from her seat on the city council on December 5, 2023. During the vacancy, her chief of staff, Henry Foster III, acted as the de facto manager of the District 4 office.

Foster won the special election on March 5, 2024, to serve the remainder of the term until 2026. His election resulted in the restoration of a 9-0 Democratic supermajority on the city council.

===== Candidates =====
====== Qualified ======
- Henry Foster III, chief of staff to former city councilmember Monica Montgomery Steppe
- Tylisa Suseberry, executive assistant in the office of State Senator Toni Atkins
- Chida Warren-Darby, boards and commissions director for Mayor Todd Gloria

====== Endorsements ======
Henry Foster III

Organizations

- San Diego County Democratic Party

Local politicians

- Monica Montgomery Steppe, member of the San Diego County Board of Supervisors from District 4 (2023-Present), former San Diego City Councilmember from District 4 (2018-2023)
- Sean Elo-Rivera, President of the San Diego City Council (2021-Present), San Diego City Councilmember from District 9 (2020-Present)
Chida Warren-Darby

Organizations

- San Diego County Young Democrats

U.S. Representatives

- Juan Vargas, U.S. Representative from California's 52nd congressional district

Local politicians

- Todd Gloria, 37th mayor of San Diego (2020-Present), former State Assemblymember from the 78th District (2016-2020), former San Diego City Councilmember from District 3 (2008-2016)

2024 San Diego City Council District 4 election
Primary election
Party	Candidate	Votes	%
Democratic	Henry Foster III	8,840	53.83
Democratic	Chida Warren-Darby	4,481	27.29
Democratic	Tylisa D. Suseberry	3,100	18.88
Total votes		16,421	100.0
Democratic hold			

==== District 5 ====
District 5 consisted of the communities of Black Mountain Ranch, Carmel Mountain Ranch, Miramar, Rancho Bernardo, Rancho Encantada, Rancho Peñasquitos, Sabre Springs, San Pasqual Valley, Scripps Ranch, and Torrey Highlands.

Incumbent Marni von Wilpert ran unopposed for re-election and won the election outright in the primary on March 5, 2024.

2024 San Diego City Council District 5 election
Primary election
Party	Candidate	Votes	%
Democratic	Marni von Wilpert (incumbent)	28,231	100.0
Total votes		28,231	100.0
Democratic hold			

==== District 7 ====
District 7 consisted of the communities of Allied Gardens, Del Cerro, Grantville, Linda Vista, Mission Valley, San Carlos, Serra Mesa, and Tierrasanta.

Incumbent Raul Campillo ran unopposed for re-election and won the election outright in the primary on March 5, 2024.

2024 San Diego City Council District 5 election
Primary election
Party	Candidate	Votes	%
Democratic	Raul Campillo (incumbent)	23,196	100.0
Total votes		23,196	100.0
Democratic hold			

==== District 9 ====
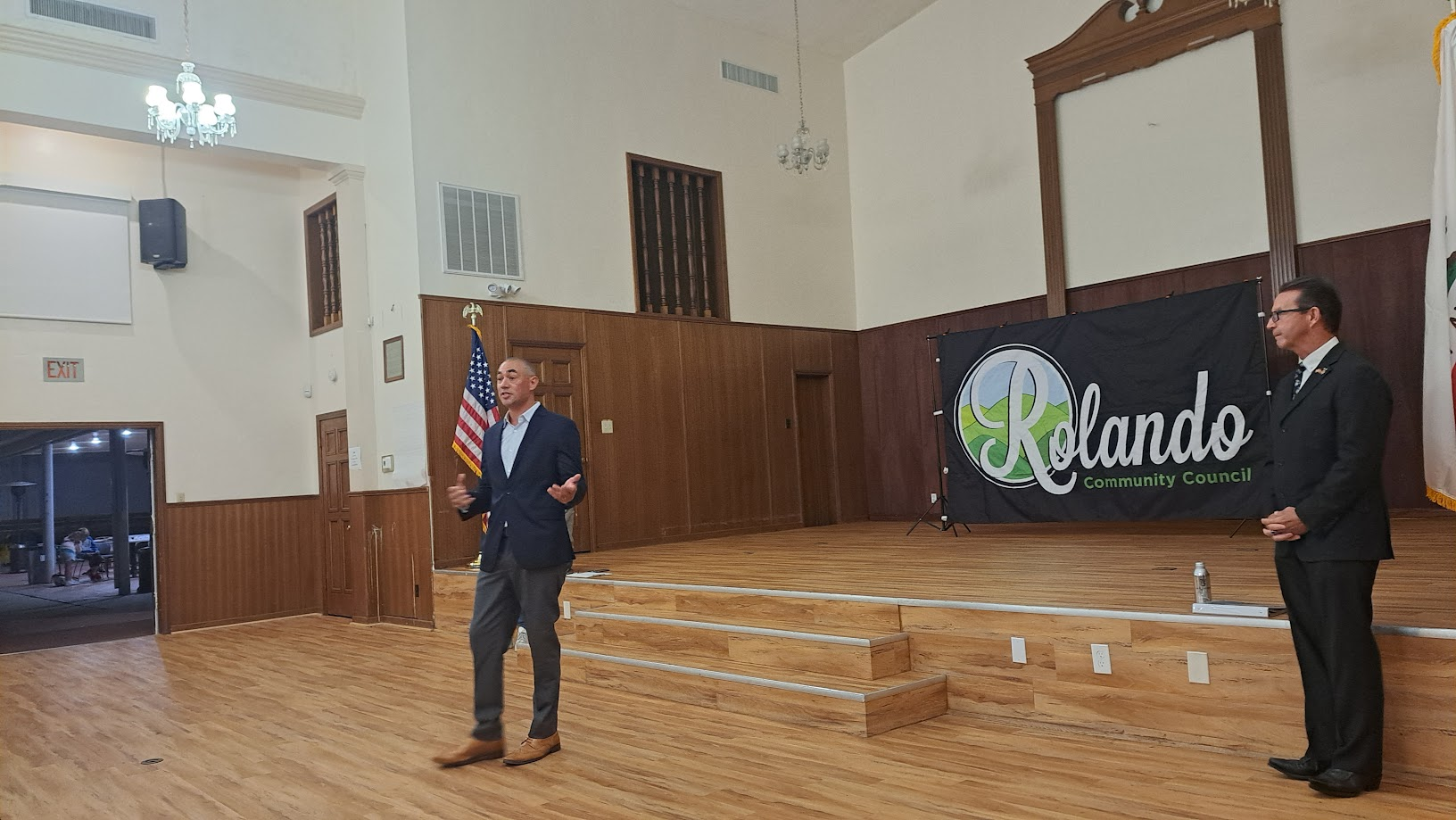
Sean Elo-Rivera and Terry Hoskins debate in Rolando (October 15, 2024)

District 9 consisted of the communities of Kensington, Normal Heights, and East San Diego, as well as the main campus of San Diego State University.

Incumbent Sean Elo-Rivera and Terry Hoskins, both Democrats, advanced from the primary on March 5, 2024, to the general election. Elo-Rivera went on to defeat Hoskins in the general election.

===== Candidates =====
====== Qualified ======
- Sean Elo-Rivera, San Diego City Council president (2021–present), San Diego City Councilmember from District 9 (2020–present)
- Terry Hoskins
- Fernando Garcia

====== Endorsements ======
Sean Elo-Rivera

Organizations

- California Working Families Party
- San Diego County Democratic Party
- San Diego & Imperial Counties Labor Council, AFL–CIO
- San Diego Democrats for Equality
- YIMBY Democrats of San Diego

U.S. Representatives

- Sara Jacobs, U.S Representative from California's 51st congressional district

Local politicians

- Monica Montgomery Steppe, member of the San Diego County Board of Supervisors from District 4(2023-Present), former San Diego City Councilmember from District 4 (2018-2023)
- Nora Vargas, member of the San Diego County Board of Supervisors from District 1(2021–present)
- Todd Gloria, 37th mayor of San Diego (2020-Present), former State Assemblymember from the 78th District (2016-2020), former San Diego City Councilmember from District 3 (2008-2016)
- Joe LaCava, San Diego City Councilmember from District 1 (2020-present)
- Kent Lee, San Diego City Councilmember from District 6 (2022-present)
Terry Hoskins

Organizations

- San Diego Police Officers Association

Local politicians

- Myrtle Cole, former San Diego City Councilmember from District 4 (2008-2016)
- Marti Emerald, former San Diego City Councilmember from District 7 (2008-2012) and District 9 (2012-2016)

2024 San Diego City Council District 9 election
Primary election
Party	Candidate	Votes	%
Democratic	Sean Elo-Rivera (incumbent)	10,042	51.9
Democratic	Terry Hoskins	5,816	30.1
Independent	Fernando Garcia	3,491	18.0
Total votes		19,349	100.0
General election
Democratic	Sean Elo-Rivera	26,765	60.9
Democratic	Terry Hoskins	17,213	39.1
Total votes		43,978	100.00
Democratic hold			

==== Council president ====
After the election, incumbent council president Elo-Rivera, who had served since 2021, announced that he would not seek another term as council president. He was succeeded by president pro tempore Joe LaCava, who was elected in a 9–0 vote on December 10, 2024.
