= 2004 San Diego City Council election =

- November 2, 2004

4 of the 8 seats on the San Diego City Council
| | Majority party | Minority party |
|---|---|---|
| Party | Democratic | Republican |
| Seats before | 6 | 2 |
| Seats after | 6 | 2 |
| Seat change | Steady | Steady |

The 2004 San Diego City Council election occurred on November 2, 2004. The primary election was held on March 2, 2004. Four of the eight seats of the San Diego City Council were contested. This election used the boundaries created by the 2000 Redistricting Committee for the odd-numbered districts. All four incumbent council members ran for reelection in their respective districts.

Municipal elections in California are officially non-partisan, although most candidates do identify a party preference. A two-round system was used for the election, starting with a primary in March followed by a runoff in November between the top-two candidates if no candidate received a majority of the votes in the first round.

== Campaign ==
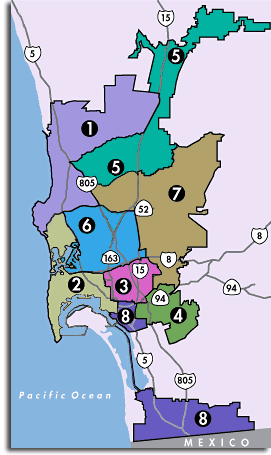
Council Districts used for the 2004 election

The 2004 election used the eight district boundaries created by the 2000 Redistricting Commission for the odd numbered districts. Seats in districts 1, 3, 5, and 7 were up for election.

== Results ==
=== District 1 ===
District 1 consisted of the communities of Black Mountain Ranch, Carmel Valley, Del Mar Mesa, La Jolla, Pacific Highlands Ranch, Rancho Peñasquitos, Torrey Highlands, Torrey Hills, Torrey Pines, and University City. Incumbent council member Scott Peters stood for reelection. Peters advanced out of the March primary with a plurality of the vote and was reelected with a majority of the vote in the November general election.

San Diego City Council District 1 election, 2004
Primary election
| Party | Candidate | Votes | % |
|---|---|---|---|
| Democratic | Scott Peters | 19,983 | 48.43 |
| Republican | Phil Thalheimer | 12,816 | 31.06 |
| Democratic | Kathryn Burton | 8,433 | 20.44 |
| Total votes | | 41,260 | 100 |
General election
| Democratic | Scott Peters | 38,087 | 54.71 |
| Republican | Phil Thalheimer | 31,535 | 45.29 |
| Total votes | | 69,622 | 100 |

=== District 3 ===
District 3 consisted of the communities of Balboa Park, City Heights, Golden Hill, Hillcrest, Kensington, Normal Heights, North Park, South Park, Talmadge, and University Heights. Incumbent council member Toni Atkins stood for reelection. Atkins was reelected with a majority of the vote in the March primary.

San Diego City Council District 3 election, 2004
Primary election
| Party | Candidate | Votes | % |
|---|---|---|---|
| Democratic | Toni Atkins | 16,273 | 60.37 |
| Democratic | John Hartley | 8,746 | 32.45 |
| Republican | Gonzalo Garcia | 1,898 | 7.04 |
| Total votes | | 26,954 | 100 |

=== District 5 ===
District 5 consisted of the communities of Carmel Mountain Ranch, Mira Mesa, Rancho Bernardo, Sabre Springs, Scripps Ranch, and San Pasqual. Incumbent council member Brian Maienschein ran for reelection uncontested and was therefore elected with 100 percent of the vote in the March primary.

San Diego City Council District 5 election, 2004
Primary election
| Party | Candidate | Votes | % |
|---|---|---|---|
| Republican | Brian Maienschein | 33,024 | 100.00 |
| Total votes | | 33,024 | 100 |

=== District 7 ===
District 7 consisted of the communities of Allied Gardens, City Heights, College Area, Del Cerro, El Cerrito, Grantville, MCAS Miramar, Mission Trails Regional Park, Redwood Village – Oak Park, Rolando, San Carlos, Stonebridge Estates, and Tierrasanta. Incumbent council member Jim Madaffer stood for reelection. Madaffer was reelected with a majority of the vote in the March primary.

San Diego City Council District 7 election, 2004
Primary election
| Party | Candidate | Votes | % |
|---|---|---|---|
| Republican | Jim Madaffer | 20,977 | 68.35 |
| Democratic | Irene Stallard-Rodriguez | 9,659 | 31.47 |
| Total votes | | 30,689 | 100 |

== Deputy Mayor ==
The new city council was sworn in December 2004. Council member Michael Zucchet of district 2 was initially tapped to serve as deputy mayor. Zucchet briefly served as acting mayor of San Diego after the resignation of Dick Murphy. Atkins took over as acting mayor when Zucchet was forced to resign shortly thereafter due to a corruption conviction.
