= Mission Times Courier =

- Type: Community newspaper
- Format: Tabloid
- Owner: San Diego Community Newspaper Group
- Editor: Dave Thomas
- Founded: 1995 (as Navajo Times)
- Headquarters: 1621 Grand Ave., Suite C San Diego, California 92109
- Circulation: 30,000 delivered to all homes in their circulation area 5,500 delivered to over 140 retail businesses
- Website: MissionTimesCourier.com

The Mission Times Courier is a monthly community newspaper published in San Diego, California, by Mannis Communications, Inc. The newspaper was founded May 11, 1995, by Sally and Jim Madaffer. On July 1, 2014, it was purchased by David Mannis, publisher of the San Diego Community News Network, Inc. In April 2019 the paper was sold to Julie Main, publisher of the San Diego Community Newspaper Group, SDNews.com SDCNG also publishes the La Jolla Village News, Beach & Bay Press, Peninsula Beacon, San Diego Uptown News, San Diego Uptown News and La Mesa Courier.

The Mission Times Courier carries news of local community interest covering the San Diego communities of Mission Gorge, Mission Trails, Fletcher Hills, Allied Gardens, Del Cerro, Grantville, Rolando, San Carlos and surrounding areas.

Approximately 4,800 Mission Times Courier newspapers are distributed to over 120 high-traffic locations. An additional 21,000 copies are directly delivered door-to-door to homes in these communities.

== San Diego Press Club Awards ==
- Non-Daily Newspapers Feature Layout: Mission Times Courier, for Happy 50th Birthday Allied Gardens

== Publishers ==
- Sally Ortega Madaffer and Jim Madaffer, 1995–2010
- Jim Madaffer, 2010–2014
- David Mannis, 2014–2019
- Julie Main, 2019–present
