= 2008 San Diego City Attorney election =

- November 4, 2008
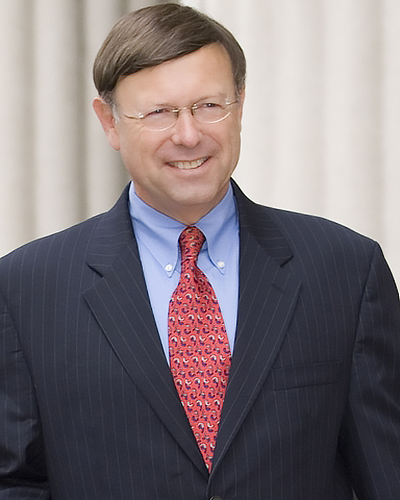

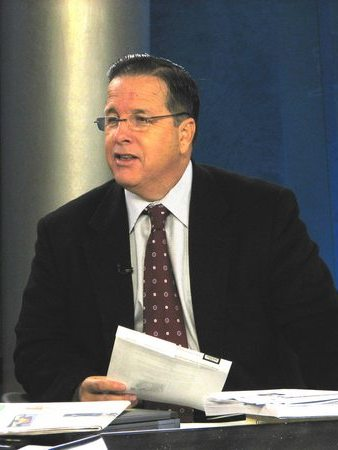
| Nominee | Jan Goldsmith | Mike Aguirre |
| Party | Republican | Democratic |
| Popular vote | 278,830 | 189,628 |
| Percentage | 59.5% | 40.5% |
City Attorney before election
Mike Aguirre
Democratic
Elected City Attorney
Jan Goldsmith
Republican

The 2008 San Diego City Attorney election occurred on Tuesday, November 4, 2008. The primary election was held on Tuesday, June 3, 2008.

Municipal elections in California are officially non-partisan, although most members do identify a party preference. A two-round system was used for the election, starting with a primary in June followed by a runoff in November between the top-two candidates.

== Results ==
San Diego City Attorney primary election, 2008
| Party | Candidate | Votes | % |
|---|---|---|---|
| Republican | Jan Goldsmith | 68,326 | 32.25% |
| Democratic | Michael J. Aguirre | 61,257 | 28.92% |
| Democratic | Scott Peters | 43,295 | 20.44% |
| Republican | Brian Maienschein | 26,267 | 12.40% |
| Democratic | Amy J. Lepine | 12,687 | 5.99% |
| Total votes | | 211,832 | 100% |

San Diego City Attorney general election, 2008
| Party | Candidate | Votes | % |
|---|---|---|---|
| Republican | Jan Goldsmith | 278,830 | 59.50% |
| Democratic | Michael J. Aguirre | 189,628 | 40.50% |
| Total votes | | 469,663 | 100% |
