= Jim Madaffer =

American politician (born 1960)

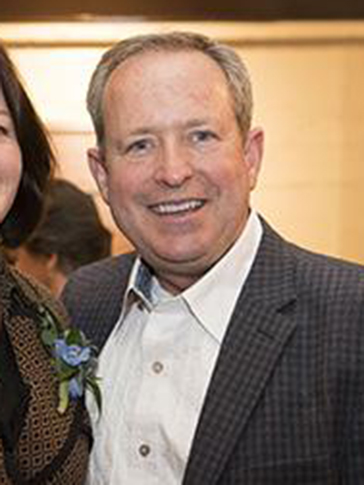
- Madaffer in 2018

Member of San Diego City Council for the 7th district
- In office December 2000 – December 2008
- Preceded by: Judy McCarty
- Succeeded by: Marti Emerald

Personal details
- Born: March 4, 1960 (age 66) San Diego, California
- Spouse: Robin Madaffer
- Children: 2
- Education: San Diego State University, Grossmont College
- Website: Madaffer Enterprises Inc.

Jim Madaffer (born March 4, 1960) is an American businessman, entrepreneur, and former politician. He served two terms as Chief of staff to a City Councilmember and was elected to the San Diego City Council from 2000 to 2008. Jim has also served in a variety of leadership roles including Deputy Mayor. He was appointed to the California Transportation Commission by Gov. Jerry Brown and also is on the board of the San Diego County Water Authority. In 2019, Madaffer was appointed by Gov. Gavin Newsom to the Colorado River Board of California. Jim is CEO of Madaffer Enterprises, Inc., a public policy and government relations firm.

== City Council ==
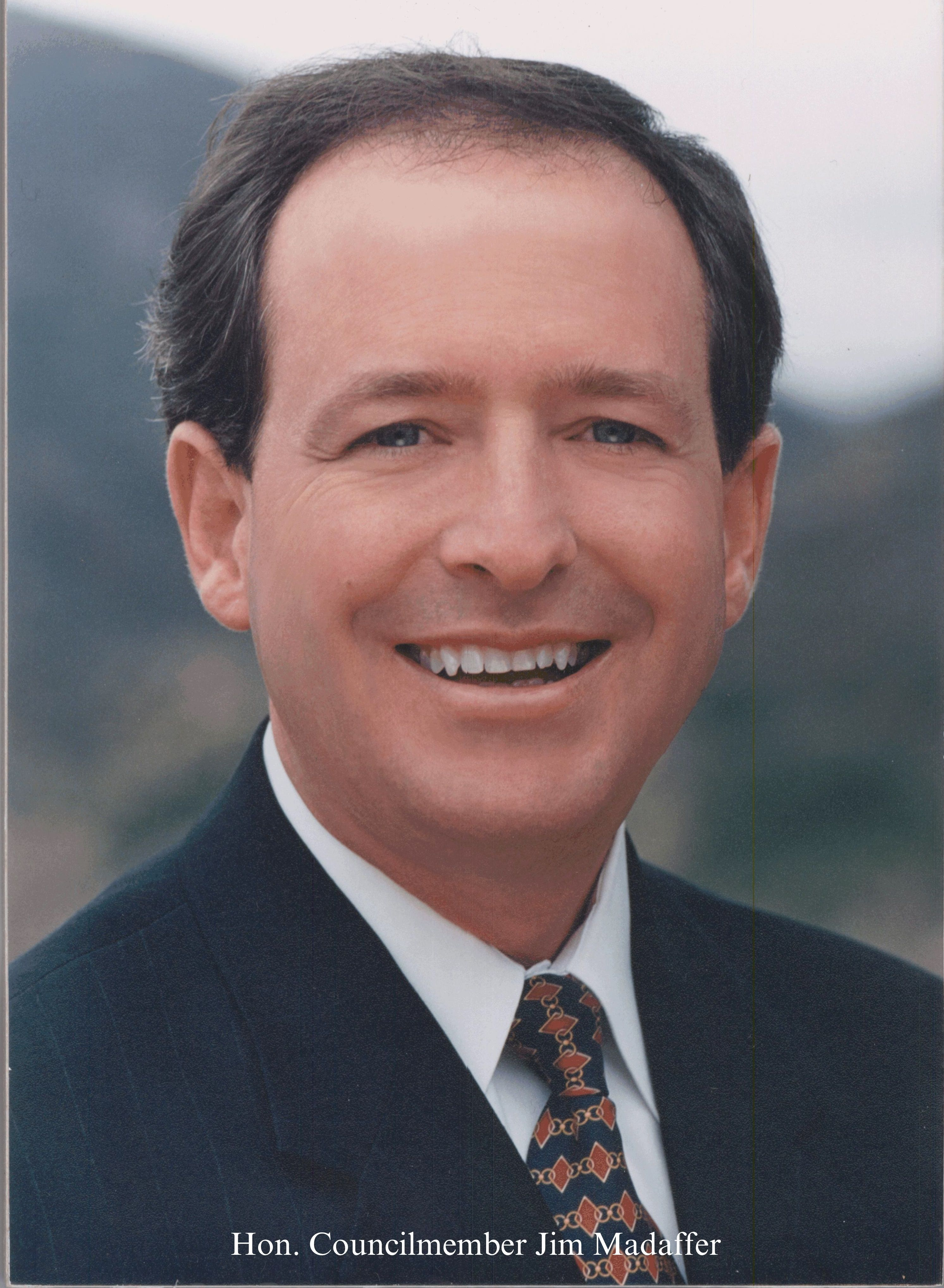
San Diego City Council member Madaffer

Madaffer began his career in government by serving as chief of staff to San Diego Councilwoman Judy McCarty from 1993 to 2000. He was re-elected in 2004 Jim was appointed to serve as Deputy Mayor in 2005 following the resignation of Mayor Dick Murphy.

Madaffer led the effort to pass a city law that required all new buildings to have automated external defibrillators. The law was passed in November 2008. He also co-founded San Diego Project Heart Beat in 2001, which helps distributes automated external defibrillators. Madaffer led the effort to pass a city law that required all new buildings to have automated external defibrillators. The law was passed in November 2008. Madaffer also was instrumental in working with Senator Ben Hueso in passing Senate Bill 287 (Hueso) which mandates AEDs in all new buildings over a certain size in the State of California.

In 2015, while traveling home with his wife, Robin, he stumbled across a jogger who was down – he pulled over his car and removed the AED he carries in his vehicle. Jim attached the device to the man's chest and began delivering electric pulses, saving his life. He was later honored by the American Red Cross for his heroic lifesaving efforts.

== Business career ==
After leaving the City Council due to term limits, he started his own government relations firm, Madaffer Enterprises Inc. He also owned four community newspapers, Mission Times Courier, Mission Valley News, La Mesa Courier and Seaside Courier, before selling them for an undisclosed amount in 2014.

He serves on the advisory board for Keenan & Associates.

== Education ==
He attended San Diego State University and studied business.

== San Diego County Water Authority ==
Madaffer is an active board member of the San Diego County Water Authority. He has served as a member since 2012 and is a part of numerous committees such as the Legislative, Public Outreach, and Imported Water. Madaffer was appointed as vice-chair in 2016 and eventually Board Chair in 2018. Madaffer led efforts by the Water Authority to minimize rate increases, develop an agriculture water rate program, and to enhance communication with board member agencies. He fulfilled his two-year term and still serves as a board member.

== California Transportation Commission ==
In 2014, Jim was appointed to the California Transportation Commission by Governor Jerry Brown. At the commission, Madaffer was appointed to chair the Road Charge Technical Advisory Committee. This group worked to create a program to replace the gasoline tax in California. The California Road Charge Technical Advisory Committee was established in 2014 by Senate Bill 1077 (DeSaulnier - Chapter 835, Statutes of 2014). SB 1077 created the California Road Charge Pilot Program and tasked the Chair of the commission, in consultation with the California State Transportation Agency (CalSTA) to convene a fifteen-member Technical Advisory Committee (TAC) to study alternatives to the gas tax, gather public comment, and make recommendations to CalSTA regarding the design of a road charge pilot program. CalSTA published the Road Charge Pilot Program Report on December 8, 2017. The Commission included their recommendations regarding the pilot program in its annual report to the Legislature. Madaffer resigned from the Commission in January 2019 to devote his efforts as Chair of the San Diego County Water Authority. He was then appointed by the commission as a public member to the Road Charge Task Force which he continues to serve on today.
