= Navajo, San Diego =

Coordinates: 32°47′29.25″N 117°4′32.9″W

Navajo is a hilly community in San Diego, California, near East County. It is a designated planning area for the city of San Diego. It includes the neighborhoods of Del Cerro, Grantville, San Carlos, and Allied Gardens.

The area encompasses approximately 14 square miles (36 km^{2}). Its boundaries are Interstate 8 on the south, La Mesa on the southeast, El Cajon and Santee on the east, and the San Diego River on the north.

Navajo is known for its natural attractions such as Mission Trails Regional Park, Lake Murray, and the San Diego River. The community was named for Navajo Road, a major street that runs through the area.

The area is also served by the San Diego Trolley.
