= BIG WIRES Act =

Proposed electrical transmission legislation

Building Integrated Grids With Inter-Regional Energy Supply Act
- Other short titles: BIG WIRES Act
- Long title: A bill to require the Federal Energy Regulatory Commission to establish minimum interregional transfer capabilities, and for other purposes.

Legislative history
- Introduced in the 118th as S. 2827 H.R. 5551 by John Hickenlooper D‑CO, Scott Peters D‑CA on September 18, 2023

The Building Integrated Grids With Inter-Regional Energy Supply (BIG WIRES) Act is a bill in the 118th United States Congress. Its provisions direct the Federal Energy Regulatory Commission (FERC) to "establish minimum interregional transfer capabilities", better coordinating construction of electrical transmission lines.

The BIG WIRES Act was introduced in the United States Senate on September 18, 2023 by Senator John Hickenlooper (D‑CO) as S. 2827 and in the House of Representatives by Representative Scott Peters (D‑CA) as H.R. 5551.

A map of United States electrical transmission needs; the 2021 Average $/MWh value of interregional price differences. The highest-value links are from Texas (Electric Reliability Council of Texas) to its neighboring regional interconnections, such as from Texas to the west, with a value of $138 million/MWh.

The BIG WIRES Act's provisions require each of the FERC transmission planning regions to have interregional transfer capacity equal to 30% of their peak electrical demand, or an increase of 15% from the present, whichever is lower. Its intent is to improve the United States electrical grid and make electricity more affordable. After an 18-month rulemaking period, FERC would give its individual planning regions two years to plan grid upgrades. Among other steps, regions would negotiate bilateral agreements on construction responsibility, funding, and timelines. If a region fails to file a plan with FERC for approval, FERC would be empowered to make those interregional plans.

Representative Peters describes the bill as part of a larger effort to address climate change by reforming the construction permitting process in the United States and constructing more high-voltage transmission lines to enable clean energy investments.

== Policy goals ==
=== Grid reliability ===
The BIG WIRES Act contains provisions to increase interregional power transfer capacity in order to avoid grid collapse or insufficiency, as during times of stress on the grid, such as the February 2021 Texas power crisis, in which a winter storm caused outages in the state's isolated system, killing almost 250 people. Freezing temperatures shut down natural gas power plants and delivery systems. If power from further away could flow in to meet local shortfalls, the grid would be more resilient. Weather emergencies, such as cold snaps and heat waves, can disable electrical generation infrastructure, but when electrically interconnected geographic regions are larger than typical weather patterns, regions suffering the effects can import electricity from unaffected regions.

=== Lower costs ===
The price of electricity decreases when increased transfer capacity allows electricity from lower-priced sources to flow to demand centers. Transmission capacity is most needed in the Great Plains, Midwest, and Texas. The highest demand exists between the Western and Eastern interconnections, with the annual (2022) value of a 1-gigawatt interregional power line ranging from $29 million to $505 million.

=== Clean energy ===
The Act's provisions enable the installation of more clean energy, as increased transmission capacity is needed to transfer power from new wind and solar farms to population centers. The Inflation Reduction Act resulted in increased investments in clean energy, but Democrats consider a more efficient permitting process necessary in order to enable construction of those projects. A Princeton University study found that the Inflation Reduction Act could reduce greenhouse gas emissions in the United States by 6.3 billion tons over 10 years, though that result is contingent on more than doubling the pace of transmission line construction; specifically, 80% of the emissions reductions possible under the IRA would require a tripling of transmission line construction. Representative Peters noted that 200,000 miles of new high-voltage transmission lines are needed to meet United States climate goals, with only 1,800 miles being built per year.

The Biden administration's larger goal of decarbonizing electrical generation by 2035 is not possible without drastically increased electrical transmission. In order to reach net-zero carbon emissions, thousands of miles of high-voltage electrical lines are needed to transmit energy from solar farms fields and wind farms, mostly in rural areas, to urban demand centers, though many of these transmission lines are currently blocked in permitting by regulations and local opposition. Liza Reed of the Niskanen Center argues that giving the federal government, such as FERC, authority to permit high-voltage transmission lines would be better than the current situation, in which each state involved must grant approval. (FERC currently has similar authority to permit natural gas pipelines.)

== Implementation details ==
BIG WIRES supporters position an interregional transfer capacity requirement as less contentious than other Democratic proposals for increasing transmission, such as giving the federal government backstop permitting authority for interstate transmission lines, overruling state objections, or giving FERC the authority to spread transmission line construction costs among utility ratepayers instead of leaving them to be borne by a single wind or solar developer. An interregional transfer capability requirement is endorsed by the Biden administration and Republican-leaning groups such as the R Street Institute. While FERC had by May 2023 already set out a proposal to mandate minimum interregional transfer capacity, it was yet to issue a final rule. BIG WIRES would require FERC to implement a rule within 18 months.

David Kelley, an executive for the Southwest Power Pool, acknowledged the need for a federal requirement, stating that without federal intervention the required construction would be unlikely.

=== Responsibility ===
In response to criticism from monopoly utilities in the Southern United States that the original 30% mandate was onerous, Peters and Hickenlooper adjusted the required increase to be no more than 15% of the peak load.

The bill's provisions do not increase government expenditure, instead giving FERC oversight on the construction of an inter-regional electrical transmission network, with each FERC region required to have interregional transfer capacity equal to 30% of their peak electrical demand. The provisions also not favor any technology, countering Republican accusations that Democrats favor renewables. Rather than altering environmental regulations, "utilities and other transmission developers would be responsible for upgrading the grid."

=== Grid upgrades ===
Under provisions of the Act, FERC would give its planning regions flexibility in meeting the interregional transfer requirement. Grid upgrades could include new transmission lines or upgrades to existing ones, new or upgraded intra-regional transmission lines (to the degree that it increases interregional capacity), new generation, grid-enhancing technologies, or means to reduce peak loads such as energy efficiency or demand response measures.

== Legislative history ==
The BIG WIRES Act was introduced to Congress in September 2023 by Representative Scott Peters and Senator John Hickenlooper. In May 2023, two Democrats had unsuccessfully attempted to insert a version of their proposal into the deal to address the 2023 United States debt-ceiling crisis.

=== Debt ceiling deal ===
The BIG WIRES proposal was among six other Democratic proposals in debt ceiling negotiations to accelerate construction of transmission lines and renewable energy projects. As part of the permitting reform negotiations within debt ceiling talks, Democrats saw expanded electrical transmission as essential, while in exchange Republicans desired changes to the National Environmental Policy Act (NEPA), a bedrock piece of environmental legislation, beneficial to the fossil fuel industry, such as accelerated permitting for fuel pipelines—alongside other infrastructure such as roads and bridges—as seen in, for example, Louisiana Republican Representative Garret Graves's BUILDER Act.

Progressive Democrats in the House of Representatives opposed changes to NEPA and any debt ceiling deal that would help permit oil and gas projects, though Congressional Progressive Caucus Chair Pramila Jayapal and other Democrats left open the possibility of changes to NEPA in exchange for expanded transmission. Peters, a moderate, is one of few Democrats in favor of changes to NEPA; he hopes for NEPA changes as a means of climate action, in opposition to democratic hardliners on NEPA and in conversation with Republicans hopeful for bipartisan permitting reform agreement, such as Representatives Bruce Westerman of Arkansas and Kevin McCarthy of California.

Legislators came close to an agreement on permitting reform in the debt ceiling crisis; Democrats held transmission lines as a key priority for Biden's climate goals, while agreeing on modest NEPA changes. Due to time limits, provisions of the BIG WIRES Act were not included in the deal. Transmission legislation failed to draw bipartisan support, with Republicans being generally indifferent to hostile. The deal did include a preliminary measure, a directive that the North American Electric Reliability Corporation (NERC) deliver a report quantifying the need for interregional transfer capacity to improve grid reliability to the Federal Energy Regulatory Commission by December 2024. Climate advocates argue that waiting for the study would be an unacceptable delay. In particular, the debt ceiling bill directed the NERC to study, in consultation with all US grid operators and utilities, existing transfer capacity versus capacity required to "demonstrably strengthen reliability", with a time limit of 18 months to send its findings to FERC, which would then have 12 months to study the report and then issue conclusions to Congress. FERC by itself, without congressional approval or study results, already has the authority to establish a minimum interregional transfer capacity. The June debt deal also included a limit on the duration of environmental impact studies under NEPA.

In August 2023, the 30% threshold was considered subject to data review.

=== September introduction ===
As they introduced the bill in September 2023, Hickenlooper and Peters hoped to gain Republican assent to aid renewable energy as well as oil and gas development. In September there was bipartisan interest in permitting reform, with Republicans stating interest in inclusion of an electrical transmission component. Appealing to conservatives, the bill's provisions do not increase government expenditure or favor any technology, countering Republican accusations that Democrats favor renewables. Peters and Hickenlooper have continued to discuss their proposal with Republican allies, seeking Republican co-sponsors.

However, Senator Kevin Cramer (R‑ND) called the 30% requirement "impossible" and "impractical", an argument that Peters describes as having motivated revisions. Representative Jeff Duncan (R‑SC 3rd), who chairs the Energy and Commerce Subcommittee on Energy, Climate and Grid Security, provided no timeline for a planned hearing on transmission, but added, "However, it’s important to remember that talking solely about transmission is not going to solve our country’s energy needs." A spokesperson for the Republicans of the Energy and Commerce Committee said that "... transmission is not a substitute for generation."
