= Heather Ferbert =

American lawyer and San Diego City Attorney since 2024

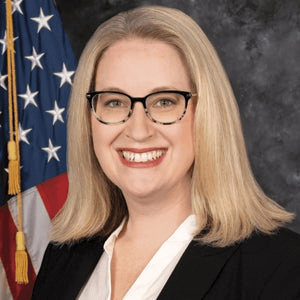

City Attorney of San Diego
- Incumbent
- Assumed office December 10, 2024
- Preceded by: Mara Elliott

Personal details
- Born: Heather Marie Ferbert California, U.S.
- Party: Democratic
- Education: California State University Long Beach (BA); University of San Diego School of Law (JD)
- Profession: Lawyer; Professor

Heather Marie Ferbert is an American lawyer and educator serving as the San Diego City Attorney since December 2024. A member of the Democratic Party, she previously served as a Chief Deputy City Attorney under her predecessor, Mara Elliott.

== Early life and education ==
Ferbert was born in California. She attended California State University, Long Beach, where she was a member of the Phi Beta Kappa honor society and graduated with a bachelor's degree in 2002. She then obtained her Juris Doctor from the University of San Diego School of Law in 2006.

== Career ==
Ferbert began her legal career in private practice, working for a firm that handled property transactions and policymaking with the San Diego Housing Commission. In 2014, she joined the San Diego City Attorney's Office, eventually rising to the position of Chief Deputy City Attorney. In this role, she led the legal team advising the San Diego City Council and ensuring compliance with the law across city departments. Her work encompassed women's rights issues, facilitating the opening of emergency homeless shelters, and prosecuting real estate fraud cases. She wrote the city's temporary eviction moratorium in 2022 and the unsafe camping ban in 2023. She has also taught at the University of San Diego School of Law, her alma mater, since 2018.

Ferbert ran for San Diego City Attorney in the 2024 election. She was endorsed by outgoing City Attorney Mara Elliott, the Deputy City Attorneys Association of San Diego, and the San Diego Union-Tribune. Ferbert and California state assemblymember Brian Maienschein advanced from the March 2024 primary with 53.2% and 46.8% of the vote, respectively. Ferbert went on to defeat Maienschein in the general election with 56.8% of the vote.

== Electoral history ==
2024 San Diego city attorney election
Primary election
Party	Candidate	Votes	%
Democratic	Heather Ferbert	122,894	53.2
Democratic	Brian Maienschein	108,264	46.8
Total votes		231,158	100.0
General election
Democratic	Heather Ferbert	282,912	56.8
Democratic	Brian Maienschein	214,872	43.2
Total votes		497,784	100.0
Democratic hold			
