= Scott Peters (politician) =

American lawyer & politician (born 1958)

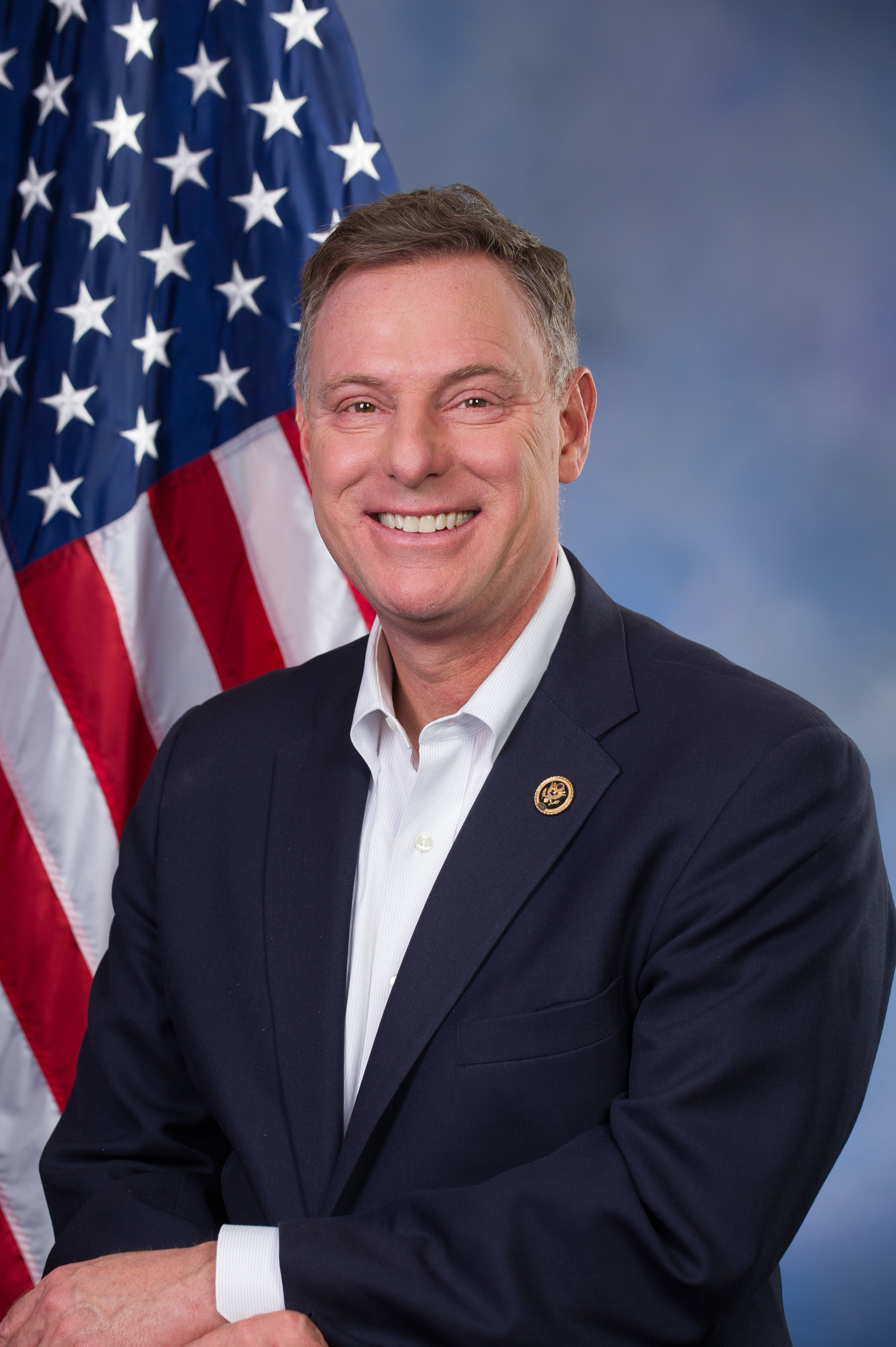

Member of the U.S. House of Representatives from California
- Incumbent
- Assumed office January 3, 2013
- Preceded by: Brian Bilbray
- Constituency: 52nd district (2013–2023); 50th district (2023–present)

President of San Diego City Council
- In office December 2006 – December 2008
- Preceded by: Position established
- Succeeded by: Ben Hueso

Member of San Diego City Council from the 1st district
- In office December 2000 – December 2008
- Preceded by: Harry Mathis
- Succeeded by: Sherri Lightner

Personal details
- Born: Scott Harvey Peters; June 17, 1958 (age 68) Springfield, Ohio, U.S.
- Party: Democratic
- Spouse: Lynn Gorguze (m. 1986)
- Children: 2
- Education: Duke University (BA); New York University (JD)
- Website: House website Campaign website
- Peters's voice Peters supporting the American Rescue Plan Act. Recorded February 26, 2021

Scott Harvey Peters (born June 17, 1958) is an American lawyer and politician serving as the U.S. representative from California's 50th congressional district since 2023, previously representing the 52nd congressional district from 2013 to 2023. His district includes both coastal and central portions of San Diego, as well as the suburbs of Poway and Coronado.

A member of the Democratic Party, Peters served two terms on the San Diego City Council from 2000 to 2008, and was the first person to serve as president of the city council from 2006 to 2008. He served as a commissioner for the Unified Port of San Diego before becoming a member of Congress.

== Early life, education, and legal career ==
Peters was born in 1958 in Springfield, Ohio. He was raised in Michigan. His father was a Lutheran minister, and his mother was a homemaker. Peters has said that he took out student loans and participated in his school's work-study program, through which he was given jobs answering phones and cleaning pigeon cages. He received his undergraduate degree from Duke University in 1980.

Peters served as an economist on the staff of the U.S. Environmental Protection Agency (EPA), then earned a J.D. degree from the New York University School of Law (’84). Before his election to the city council, he worked as a deputy county counsel for San Diego County and as an attorney in private practice focusing on environmental law. He gained notability in a lawsuit against a local shipbuilder.

== California government career ==
=== California Coastal Commission ===
In 2002, Peters was appointed to the California Coastal Commission. He served one three-year term on the Commission. A coalition of environmental groups gave his votes an environmental score of 31% in 2002, 52% in 2003 and 40% in 2004. He was "involuntarily retired" in 2005 when new State Assembly Speaker Fabian Nunez did not renew his appointment.

=== City Council (2000–2008) ===
==== Elections ====
In 2000, Peters ran for the San Diego City Council's 1st district. In the open primary, he ranked second with 24% of the vote, qualifying for the November general election. Businesswoman Linda Davis ranked first with 32% of the vote. Peters defeated Davis, 53%-47%.

In the 2004 open primary, he came in first with 48% of the vote. Businessman Phil Thalheimer ranked second with 31% of the vote. In the November election, Peters was reelected, defeating Thalheimer 55%-45%.

==== Tenure ====
In 2004, San Diego city residents voted to change the structure of city government from a council-city manager form to a mayor-council form, which made the mayor the city's chief executive officer. Serving as a member of the city council during this time, Peters was elected to chair the transition committee in charge of this project.

In 2005, Peters's fellow council members elected him to serve as the first president of the San Diego City Council, which under the new form of government made him the chief officer of the city's newly defined legislative branch. In 2008, San Diego's mayor vetoed a 24% pay raise for the city council that Peters and four other council members had voted for.

Peters was a member of the San Diego City Council during the San Diego pension scandal. In 2002, he voted with the majority to underfund the employee pension system. The ensuing Securities and Exchange Commission investigation cleared Peters and the other council members of fraud, but the Kroll Report investigation called them "negligent." The city spent $7 million defending officials involved in this case, including $631,000 defending Peters. During the 2012 congressional election campaign, his Republican opponent, Brian Bilbray, made the scandal a major issue.

In 2007, Peters was criticized for excessive water use during a drought. He ended the year having consumed more than 1 million gallons of water for his home, which sits on a 34,848-square-foot lot near Mount Soledad, and for an adjacent landscaped parcel.

Peters cited a reduction in sewer spills and beach closure days as accomplishments during his city council tenure. He stated that the city averaged one spill per day when he was elected in 2000, but that the incidence of such spills fell 80% during his terms in office. He was involved in the push to ban alcohol from the city's beaches, as well as to ban smoking from public beaches and parks.

=== 2008 city attorney election ===
Having reached the end of his eight-year term limit on the city council, Peters ran for San Diego City Attorney in 2008, challenging incumbent City Attorney Mike Aguirre. In the open primary, state legislator Jan Goldsmith ranked first with 32% of the vote. The incumbent ranked second with 29% of the vote, qualifying for the runoff election. Peters ranked third with 20% of the vote and did not advance to the runoff. He later served as deputy county counsel for the County of San Diego.

=== Port Commission (2009–2012) ===
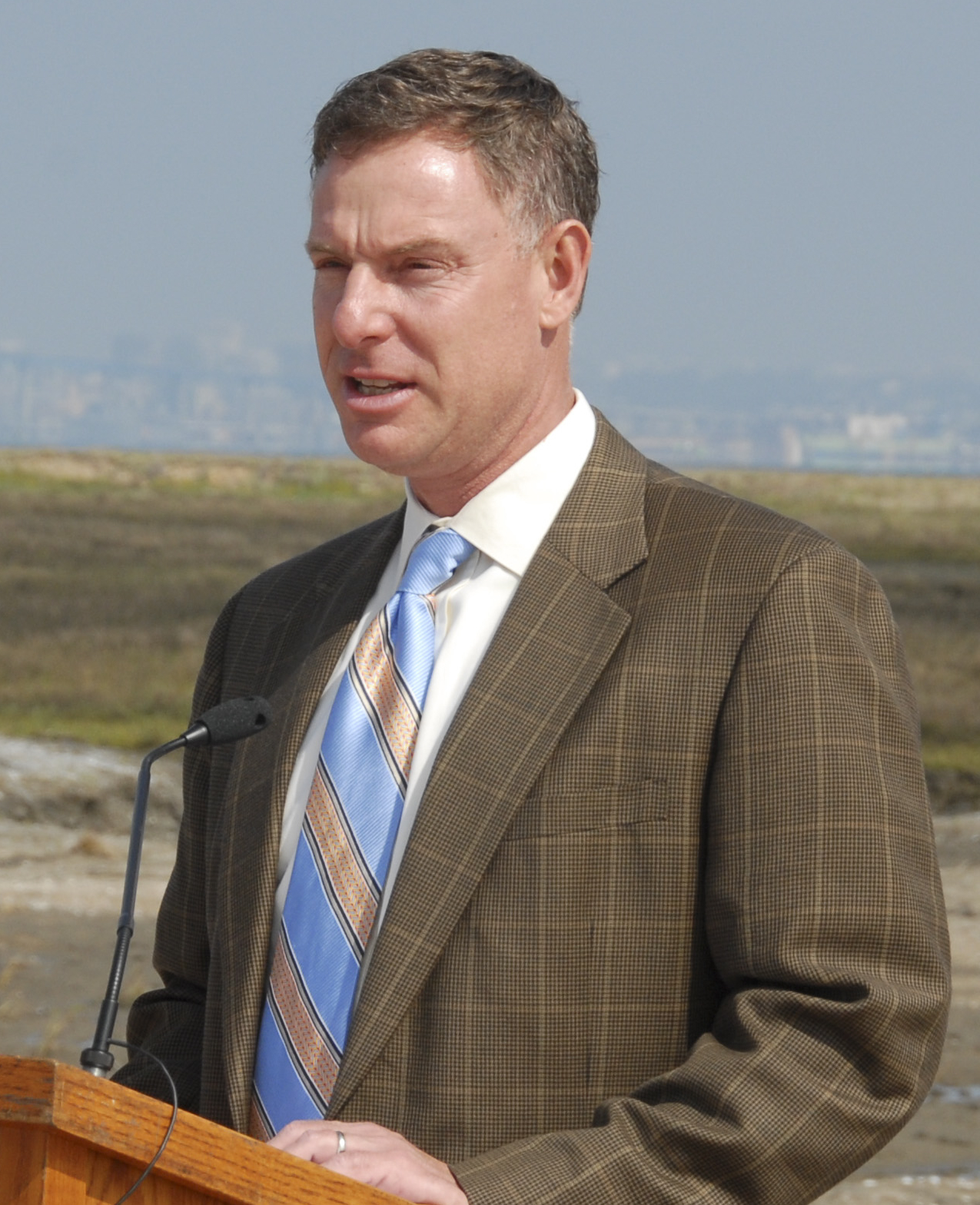
Scott Peters in 2011

Peters was a port commissioner from 2009 through 2012, serving as chair of the Port Commission in 2011. He was sworn in as a commissioner in January 2009, after having been appointed by the San Diego City Council. He represented the City of San Diego on the Port Commission, making decisions about the uses of San Diego Bay and its adjacent waterfront land.

Peters's fellow commissioners chose him to serve as chair of the board of commissioners for 2011. In January 2011, he said one of his top priorities was to decommission the South Bay Power Plant in Chula Vista to make room for better use. In the year Peters served as chair, the board of commissioners reached a deal with the former operator of the plant for its demolition. The Port also conducted community outreach for six months to gather ideas for improving San Diego's waterfront "front porch" between the airport and Seaport Village.

== U.S. House of Representatives (2013–present) ==
=== Elections ===
==== 2012 ====
Peters ran for the newly redrawn 52nd district in 2012. The district had previously been the 50th district, represented by Republican incumbent Brian Bilbray. In the final month of the race, Peters lent $1.25 million to his own campaign. In the open primary, Bilbray ranked first with 41% of the vote. Peters ranked second with 23% of the vote, qualifying for the November general election ballot. He narrowly edged out State Assemblywoman Lori Saldaña, a fellow Democrat, who earned 22% of the vote. The other candidates all received single-digit percentages. During the primary, Peters received the endorsement of retiring congressman Bob Filner of the neighboring 51st district. On election night the vote was too close to call, but Peters's small lead increased each day as more absentee, vote-by-mail, and provisional ballots were processed. On November 16, Bilbray conceded to Peters. Peters defeated Bilbray 51%-49%, a difference of 6,956 votes. He became the first Democrat to represent what is now the 52nd since 1991, when Jim Bates was unseated in what was then the 44th district (it was renumbered the 51st in 1993 and the 50th in 2003).

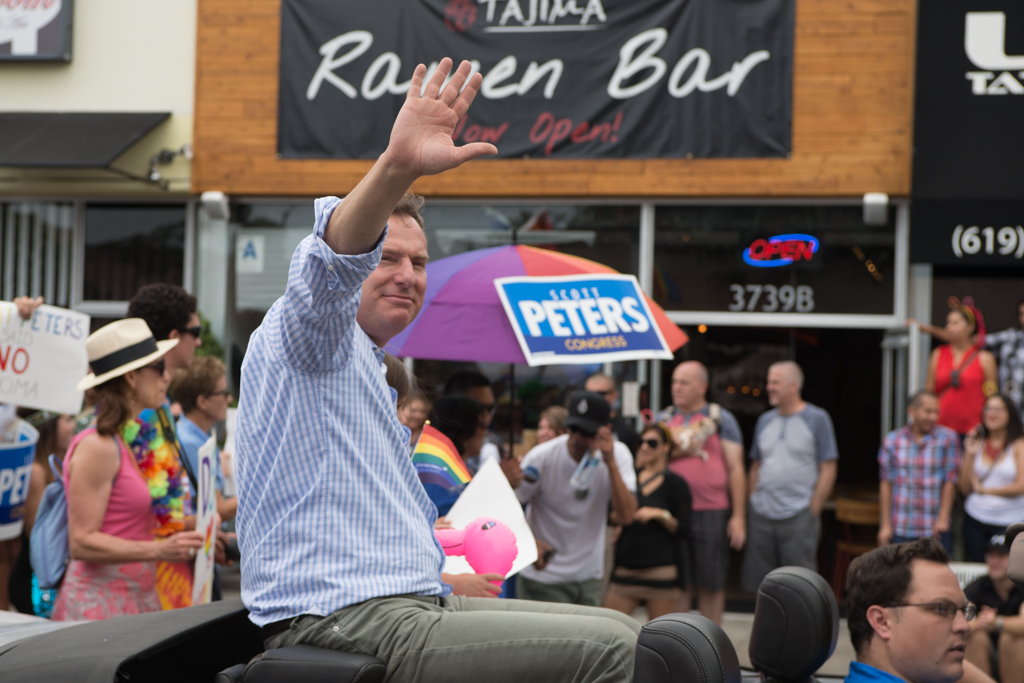
Scott Peters in the 2014 San Diego LGBT Pride Parade

==== 2014 ====
In the June 2014 primary, Peters was opposed by three Republicans. Peters was the top vote-getter with 42%. Under California's "top two" primary system, he faced the second-place finisher, former city councilman Carl DeMaio, in the November general election. Peters was a member of the Democratic Congressional Campaign Committee's Frontline Program. The program is designed to help protect vulnerable Democratic candidates. In August, Peters was endorsed by the United States Chamber of Commerce, which usually endorses Republicans. Peters was supported by 100 PACs that had supported the Republican incumbent, Brian Bilbray, in the previous cycle.

In a poll conducted by SurveyUSA for U-T San Diego and 10News during September 11–15, 2014, Peters polled at 47% and DeMaio at 46%. The same poll taken October 2–6 showed DeMaio with a 3-point lead over Peters, within the margin of error. An earlier Survey USA poll showed Peters leading by one point.

On election night the result was too close to call, with DeMaio ahead by 751 votes. Over the next few days Peters pulled into the lead. By Friday, Peters had a lead of 4,491 votes, and the Associated Press called the election for him. The final result was Peters 51.59% and DeMaio 48.41%.

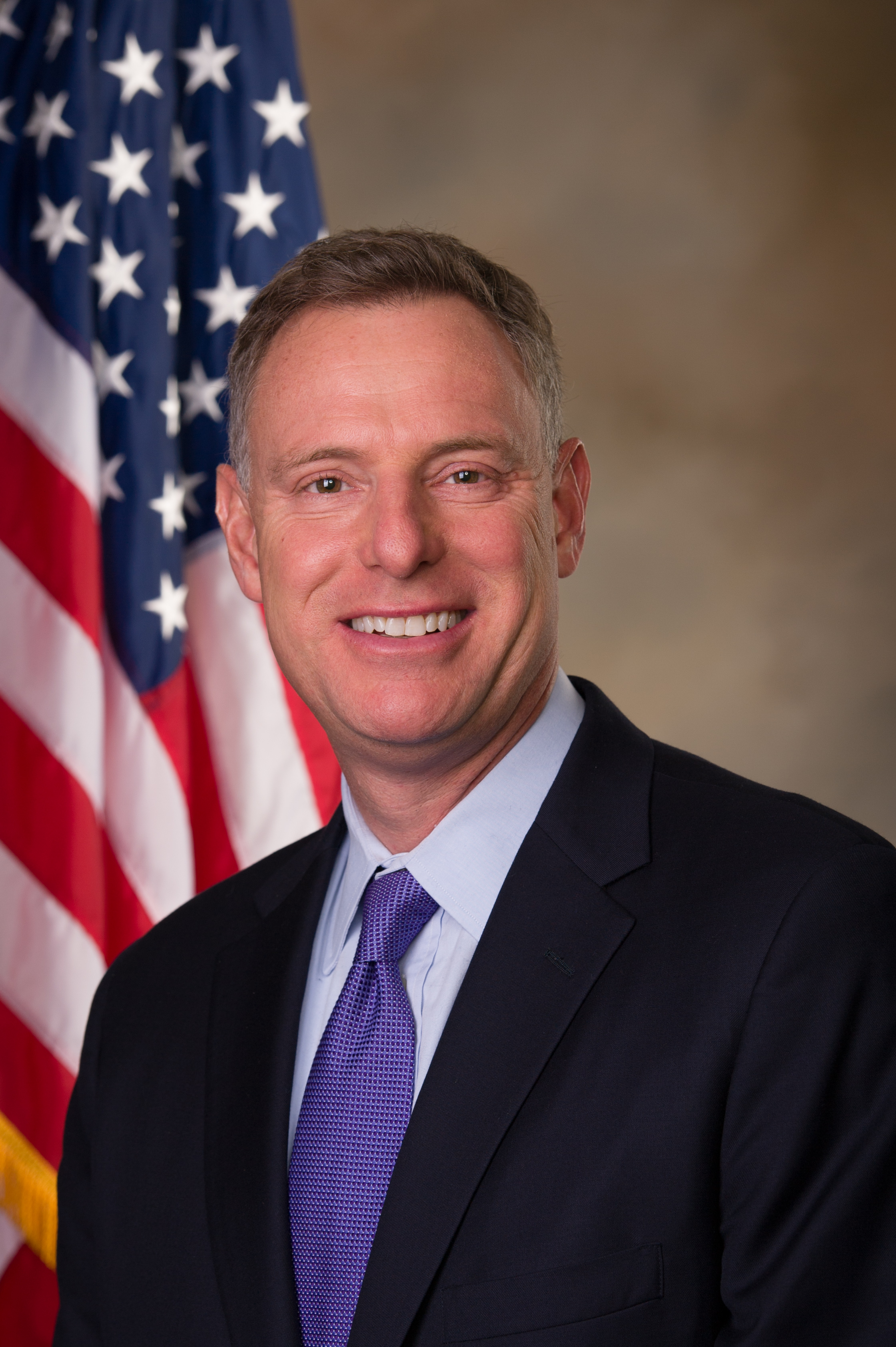
Peters freshman portrait

==== 2022 ====
After his district changed to the 50th district, Peters was reelected with 62.8% of the vote over Republican Corey Gustafson.

=== Tenure ===
Peters supported reauthorizing the Violence Against Women Act in early 2013. In April of that year, he voted for the Cyber Intelligence Sharing and Protection Act, a bill that would allow federal intelligence agencies to share cybersecurity intelligence and information with private entities and utilities. Peters co-sponsored the BREATHE Act in March 2013. In May, he voted against repeal of the Patient Protection and Affordable Care Act (PPACA). The same year, he co-sponsored the Student Non-Discrimination Act. In October 2013, Peters was one of nine Democratic co-sponsors of HR3425, an unsuccessful proposal to delay any penalties under the PPACA until four months after the program's website was fully functional. As of late 2013, Peters had voted the same way as Republican Speaker of the House John Boehner nine of the 16 times that Boehner had cast a vote.

In 2014, the U.S. Chamber of Commerce, a Republican-affiliated lobbying group, said Peters voted with the Chamber's position on key bills 69% of the time. Also in 2014, Peters said he would prefer that Congress develop a strategy to deal with climate change, but that in lieu of congressional action, he would support President Obama's moves to bypass Congress and look for an international climate change deal.

Peters signed the Respect for Marriage Act in early 2015. Months later, the Supreme Court decided Obergefell v. Hodges, making the act de facto federal law.

Peters co-sponsored the Safe Drinking Water Act Improved Compliance Awareness Act, which would have required lead in drinking water to be reported to the public. In June 2016, House Democrats staged a sit-in on the House floor to protest the lack of a vote on gun control. The Speaker pro tem, Ted Poe, declared the House was in recess, and the video feed to C-SPAN was shut off. But after a brief interruption, C-SPAN was able to broadcast the sit-in because Peters streamed the activity using his Periscope account. That same month, Peters voted in support of the DARK Act.

In 2019, Peters sponsored the bipartisan Super Pollutants Act, which according to a press release from his office "aims to slow climate change by regulating black carbon, hydrofluorocarbons, and methane–some of the most potent greenhouse gases. These short-lived climate pollutants, also called super pollutants, are significantly more potent than carbon dioxide."

In 2021, Peters voted against moving forward with the Build Back Better Act, leading to protest from environmentalist and progressive groups.

=== Committee assignments ===
For the 119th Congress:

- Committee on Energy and Commerce
  - Subcommittee on Communications and Technology
  - Subcommittee on Energy, Climate, and Grid Security
  - Subcommittee on Environment, Manufacturing and Critical Minerals
- Committee on the Budget

=== Caucus memberships ===
- Congressional Equality Caucus
- House Democratic Caucus
- New Democrat Coalition
- Problem Solvers Caucus
- Congressional Arts Caucus
- Congressional Asian Pacific American Caucus
- United States Congressional International Conservation Caucus
- Climate Solutions Caucus
- U.S.-Japan Caucus
- Congressional YIMBY Caucus
- Congressional Taiwan Caucus
- Rare Disease Caucus

== Political positions ==
Peters is a moderate Democrat. He is vice-chair of the centrist New Democrat Coalition. A 2016 analysis found that Peters was among the House members "most likely to vote against his fellow party members." He was quoted saying "I’m proud of my independent record." Peters endorsed Michael Bloomberg's 2020 presidential campaign, saying that "we need an alternative to Sen. Sanders and Sen. Warren... I disagree with them more on policy."

=== Abortion ===
Peters is pro-choice. He has a 100% rating from NARAL Pro-Choice America and an F grade from the Susan B. Anthony List, an anti-abortion organization, for his abortion-related voting record. He opposed the overturning of Roe v. Wade.

=== Civil rights ===
==== LGBTQ+ ====
Peters supports same-sex marriage.

==== Women's rights ====
His efforts to support women's rights earned him an endorsement from the Feminist Majority in 2012.

=== Climate change ===
Peters supports bipartisan climate action. Peters has called climate change "a global emergency and imminent threat that requires us to work across party lines to take bold, immediate action." He supports efforts to decarbonize the economy to become net-zero carbon, including charging for carbon expenditures. He also wants to regulate methane, hydrofluorocarbons and black carbon, which he believes contribute to climate change. Peters also wants to see the auto industry transition to electric vehicles.

Wildfires

Peters acknowledges that wildfires have increased due to climate change. He considers wildfires, and natural disasters, high priority in his district. He has sponsored legislation to ensure transparency in government spending on disaster responses. He also has supported the Wildfire Disaster Funding Act to fund wildfire suppression and prevention efforts.

=== COVID-19 ===
Peters called the Trump administration's response to COVID-19 "abysmal" and said that "other countries look on with a mixture of horror and pity for how this has gone for us.” He pushed to oppose a patent waiver that would allow developing nations to create their own vaccines.

=== Energy and oil ===
Peters opposes expanding offshore drilling and has supported efforts to ban it in the Gulf of Mexico. He supports nuclear energy and investing in advanced nuclear technologies. In September 2023, Peters introduced the BIG WIRES Act in the House as H.R. 5551 alongside Senator John Hickenlooper (D‑CO), who introduced it in the United States Senate. The bill's provisions direct the Federal Energy Regulatory Commission (FERC) to "establish minimum interregional transfer capabilities", better coordinating construction of electrical transmission lines. The bill is part of broader push to accelerate permitting for clean energy.

In January 2025, Peters introduced the Fix Our Forests Act alongside Representative Bruce Westerman. The bill aims to improve forest management for wildfire risk reduction.

=== Government reform ===
Peters supports D.C. statehood.

Voting rights

Peters opposes requiring photo ID to vote. He supports automatic voter registration for eligible voters and making election day a federal holiday.

=== Guns ===
Peters supports background check requirements for every firearm sale and transfer.

=== Health care ===
He supports the Affordable Care Act and opposes efforts to repeal it.

In 2019, Peters supported a bill to lower drug costs, but in 2021, he played a leading role in preventing its passage. Peters was one of three Democrats on the House Energy Committee to oppose allowing Medicare to negotiate drug prices, except in a small subset of cases. In September 2021, he and Representatives Kurt Schrader and Kathleen Rice joined Republican members to block committee passage of such a bill, 29-29. Peters appeared to be the leader of the opposition group. Peters has received consistent and considerable financial support from the pharmaceutical industry since he was first elected in 2012. Over his career, pharmaceutical PACs and employees have donated $860,465 to his campaigns, the second-most of any industry, according to Open Secrets. By mid-September in the 2022 election cycle, pharmaceutical industry contributions to Peters exceeded those of all other House members and candidates at $88,550.

=== Housing ===
Peters considers housing and homelessness top concerns in his district. He supports affordable housing and building dense housing near transit, with the goal of getting more homes being built while improving transit infrastructure.

=== Immigration ===
Peters supports the DREAM Act and creating paths to citizenship for longtime immigrant U.S. residents. He opposed the Trump administration family separation policy. Peters co-sponsored the Providing Justice for Asylum Seekers Act to make it easier for immigration judges to reschedule cases to avoid automatic deportation of people seeking asylum.

=== Military ===
Peters has led efforts to improve infrastructure at Marine Corps Air Station Miramar. He has encouraged the building of new Navy ships based in San Diego. He supports a new Navy SEALs training facility in the San Diego area.

=== Police ===
Peters co-sponsored the Justice in Policing Act. He believes in partnering with law enforcement officers "to change the culture."

=== U.S.-Mexico relations ===
Peters considers the border relations between San Diego and Mexico one of his district's top priorities. He opposed Donald Trump's proposed Mexico–United States border wall and supports the USMCA. He has led efforts to upgrade the San Ysidro Port of Entry to reduce border waits. He also supports modernizing border security.

=== Big Tech ===
In 2022, Peters was one of 16 Democrats to vote against the Merger Filing Fee Modernization Act of 2022, an antitrust package that would crack down on corporations for anti-competitive behavior.

== Personal life ==
Peters lives with his family in La Jolla. He and his wife, Lynn E. Gorguze, have two children. Gorguze is president and CEO of Cameron Holdings, and his family has a net worth of $112 million. As of 2014, Peters was the sixth-wealthiest member of Congress.

== Electoral history ==
San Diego City Council election, 2000: District 1
Candidate	First-round		Runoff	
Candidate	Votes	%	Votes	%
Scott Peters	8,380	23.90	33,438	52.82
Linda Davis	11,342	32.35	29,872	47.18
Lisa Ross	7,971	22.73		
Paul Kennerson	4,059	11.58		
Jim Ryan	3,312	9.45		
Total	35,064	100	63,310	100

San Diego City Council election, 2004: District 1
Primary election
Party	Candidate	Votes	%
Democratic	Scott Peters (incumbent)	19,983	48.43
Republican	Phil Thalheimer	12,816	31.06
Democratic	Kathryn Burton	8,433	20.44
Total votes		41,260	100
General election
Democratic	Scott Peters (incumbent)	38,087	54.71
Republican	Phil Thalheimer	31,535	45.29
Total votes		69,622	100

2008 San Diego City Attorney primary election
Party	Candidate	Votes	%
Republican	Jan Goldsmith	68,326	32.25
Democratic	Mike Aguirre (incumbent)	61,257	28.92
Democratic	Scott Peters	43,295	20.44
Republican	Brian Maienschein	26,267	12.40
Democratic	Amy Lepine	12,687	5.99
Total votes		211,832	100

US House election, 2012: California District 52
Primary election
Party	Candidate	Votes	%
Republican	Brian Bilbray (incumbent)	61,930	41.02
Democratic	Scott Peters	34,106	22.59
Democratic	Lori Saldaña	33,387	22.11
No party preference	Jack Doyle	6,138	4.07
Republican	John K. Stahl	5,502	3.64
Republican	Wayne Iverson	4,476	2.96
Democratic	Shirley Decourt-Park	2,368	1.57
No party preference	Ehab Shehata	1,156	0.77
Republican	John Subka	1,091	0.72
Republican	Gene Hamilton Carswell	828	0.55
Total votes		150,982	100
General election
Democratic	Scott Peters	151,451	51.18
Republican	Brian Bilbray (incumbent)	144,495	48.82
Total votes		295,946	100.0
Democratic gain from Republican			

US House election, 2014: California District 52
Primary election
Party	Candidate	Votes	%
Democratic	Scott Peters (incumbent)	53,926	42.29
Republican	Carl DeMaio	44,954	35.26
Republican	Kirk Jorgensen	23,588	18.50
Republican	Fred Simon Jr.	5,040	3.95
Total votes		127,508	100
General election
Democratic	Scott Peters (incumbent)	98,826	51.59
Republican	Carl DeMaio	92,746	48.41
Total votes		191,572	100
Democratic hold			

US House election, 2016: California District 52
Primary election
Party	Candidate	Votes	%
Democratic	Scott Peters (incumbent)	108,020	58.87
Republican	Denise Gitsham	29,658	16.16
Republican	Jacquie Atkinson	23,927	13.04
Republican	Kenneth "Mike" Canada	8,268	4.51
Republican	Terry Reagan Allvord	8,194	4.47
Republican	John Horst	5,435	2.96
Total votes		183,502	100
General election
Democratic	Scott Peters (incumbent)	181,253	56.53
Republican	Denise Gitsham	139,403	43.47
Total votes		320,656	100
Democratic hold			

US House election, 2018: California District 52
Primary election
Party	Candidate	Votes	%
Democratic	Scott Peters (incumbent)	98,744	59.04
Republican	Omar Qudrat	25,530	15.27
Republican	James Veltmeyer	19,040	11.39
Republican	Daniel Casara	7,680	4.59
Republican	Michael Allman	6,561	3.92
Republican	John Horst	5,654	3.38
Republican	Jeffery Cullen	4,027	2.41
Total votes		167,236	100
General election
Democratic	Scott Peters (incumbent)	188,992	63.85
Republican	Omar Qudrat	107,015	36.15
Total votes		296,007	100
Democratic hold			

US House election, 2020: California District 52
Primary election
Party	Candidate	Votes	%
Democratic	Scott Peters (incumbent)	111,897	49.12
Republican	Jim DeBello	73,779	32.39
Democratic	Nancy Casady	36,422	15.99
No party preference	Ryan Cunningham	5,701	2.50
Total votes		227,799	100
General election
Democratic	Scott Peters (incumbent)	244,145	61.58
Republican	Jim DeBello	152,350	38.42
Total votes		396,495	100
Democratic hold			

US House election, 2022: California District 50
Primary election
Party	Candidate	Votes	%
Democratic	Scott Peters (incumbent)	89,894	52.33
Republican	Corey Gustafson	51,312	29.87
Democratic	Kylie Taitano	16,065	9.35
Republican	David Chiddick	9,333	5.43
No party preference	Adam Schindler	5,168	3.01
Total votes		171,772	100
General election
Democratic	Scott Peters (incumbent)	168,816	62.84
Republican	Corey Gustafson	99,819	37.16
Total votes		268,635	100
Democratic hold			

US House election, 2024: California District 50
Primary election
Party	Candidate	Votes	%
Democratic	Scott Peters (incumbent)	97,601	57.00
Republican	Peter Bono	40,284	23.52
Republican	Solomon Moss	20,252	11.83
Democratic	Timothy Bilash	13,106	7.65
Total votes		171,243	100
General election
Democratic	Scott Peters (incumbent)	231,836	64.27
Republican	Peter Bono	128,859	35.73
Total votes		360,695	100
Democratic hold			

US House election, 2026: California District 50
Primary election
Party	Candidate	Votes	%
Democratic	Scott Peters (incumbent)	102,057	48.15
Republican	Steve Cohen	84,340	39.79
Democratic	Aishwarya "Sparky" Mitra	16,982	8.01
Democratic	Tim Arnous	3,793	1.79
Libertarian	Joe Shea	3,667	1.73
No party preference	Lucinda Jahn	1,125	0.53
Total votes		211,964	100

Political offices
New office	President of San Diego City Council; 2006–2008	Succeeded by Ben Hueso
U.S. House of Representatives
Preceded by Duncan D. Hunter	Member of the U.S. House of Representatives from California's 52nd congressional district 2013–2023	Succeeded by Juan Vargas
Preceded by Darrell Issa	Member of the U.S. House of Representatives from California's 50th congressional district 2023–present	Incumbent
U.S. order of precedence (ceremonial)
Preceded by Scott Perry	United States representatives by seniority 110th	Succeeded by Mark Pocan
