= Jan Goldsmith =

American politician (born 1951)

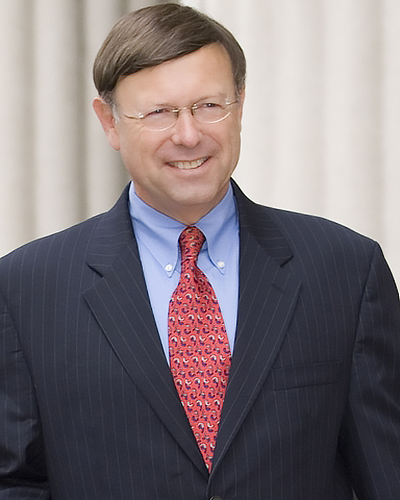

City Attorney of San Diego
- In office 2008–2016
- Preceded by: Mike Aguirre
- Succeeded by: Mara Elliott

Judge of the San Diego Superior Court
- In office 1998 – December 2008

Member of the California State Assembly from the 75th district
- In office December 7, 1992 – November 30, 1998
- Preceded by: Dede Alpert
- Succeeded by: Charlene Zettel

Mayor of Poway, California
- In office December 4, 1990 – November 3, 1992
- Preceded by: Carl Kruse
- Succeeded by: Don Higginson, Jr.

Deputy Mayor of Poway, California
- In office December 5, 1989 – December 4, 1990
- Preceded by: Linda Brannon
- Succeeded by: Bob Emery

Member of the Poway City Council
- In office December 5, 1989 – November 3, 1992

Personal details
- Born: Jan Ira Goldsmith; January 26, 1951 (age 75) New Rochelle, New York, U.S.
- Party: Republican
- Spouse: Christine (m. 1974)
- Children: 3
- Education: American University (BA); University of San Diego (JD)

Jan Ira Goldsmith (born January 26, 1951) is a Republican politician from San Diego, California, United States who served as the San Diego City Attorney from 2008 to 2016.

== Education ==
He received his undergraduate degree from American University in Washington, D.C. and his J.D. degree from the University of San Diego School of Law.

== Career ==
Upon graduating from law school he worked in private practice specializing in business litigation. He was also a council member and mayor for the city of Poway, California.

=== California State Legislature ===
Goldsmith was elected to three terms in the California state legislature, representing California's 75th State Assembly district from 1992 until 1998. The district covers Poway and other northern suburbs of San Diego County.

According to Goldsmith, his greatest legislative accomplishment had to do with juvenile justice. He chaired the Assembly subcommittee that put together a package of legislation that eventually became initiatives that the public got to vote on. He also felt foster care was another of his accomplishments. He was named legislator of the year for the Children’s Lobby. He carried the legislation that eliminated the bias against trans-racial adoption.

Goldsmith was the author of two bills, in 1994 and 1997, that attempted to legalize ferrets as pets in California. However, the California Department of Fish and Game opposed any introduction of ferrets into the state, and the bills failed.

=== Superior Court judge ===
Upon being term limited from the Assembly in 1998, Goldsmith made an unsuccessful bid for California State Treasurer, losing the primary to former Assembly Speaker Curt Pringle, who lost that election and went on to serve as mayor of Anaheim. Following his loss, Goldsmith became a San Diego County Superior Court judge, serving for 9½ years before stepping down to run for San Diego City Attorney.

=== San Diego City Attorney ===
Goldsmith ran for San Diego City attorney in 2008. In the June primary he received the most votes (32.2%) among five candidates, but not a majority. In the November runoff he defeated incumbent City Attorney Mike Aguirre, 59.4% to 40.4%. In 2012 he was re-elected without opposition.

In 2010 Goldsmith's office threatened the owners of a local restaurant with fines and jail for charging a fixed service charge instead of tipping; the issue was whether they were violating state disclosure laws. The city attorney later dropped the issue and did not pursue the case.

In 2013, Goldsmith was criticized by Mayor Bob Filner for prosecuting Jeff Olson for chalking anti-bank slogans on city sidewalks outside Bank of America branches, calling it "a stupid case" and a waste of city money. The prosecution was ultimately unsuccessful. With the defendant refusing a plea bargain, facing up to 13 years in jail and US$13,000.00 in fines, Judge Howard Shore admonished Olson's attorney, Tom Tosdal, from mentioning the First Amendment and political speech references during the trial. Additionally, Judge Shore issued a gag order, preventing communications with the media concerning the trial.

Goldsmith and Filner were in conflict almost from the day Filner took office, over several issues including medical marijuana, tourism funding, cuts to the City Attorney budget, road paving bonds, and the presence of Goldsmith's aide at confidential city meetings. Goldsmith was a key figure in the August 2013 mediated negotiations that led to Filner's agreeing to resign.

Goldsmith left the City Attorney's office in 2016 as a result of term limits.

=== Post-political career ===
In March 2017 Goldsmith returned to private practice, joining the San Diego law firm Procopio as an of-counsel attorney on its litigation team.

== Electoral history ==
=== Poway City Council ===
1988 Poway City Council at-large election (2 seats)
Candidate	Votes	%
Jan Goldsmith	8,709	23.81
Bob Emery (incumbent)	7,984	21.82
Lawrence V. Valente	6,687	18.28
Gordon Meyer	4,968	13.58
Total votes	36,582	100

=== California State Assembly ===
1992

1992 California State Assembly district 75 Republican primary
Party	Candidate	Votes	%
Republican	Jan Goldsmith	26,084	49.27
Republican	Connie Youngkin	14,987	28.31
Republican	Ken Harrell	8,668	16.37
Republican	Mike Schaefer	3,200	6.04
Total votes		52,939	100

1992 California State Assembly district 75 election
Party	Candidate	Votes	%
Republican	Jan Goldsmith	100,858	64.47
Democratic	Dante Cosentino	42,375	27.09
Libertarian	J. C. Anderson	6,282	4.02
Peace and Freedom	Alfredo R. Felix	3,037	1.94
Green	Daniel Ford Tarr	3,899	2.49
Total votes		156,451	100

1994

1994 California State Assembly district 75 Republican primary
Party	Candidate	Votes	%
Republican	Jan Goldsmith (incumbent)	38,299	100
Total votes		38,299	100

1994 California State Assembly district 75 election
Party	Candidate	Votes	%
Republican	Jan Goldsmith (incumbent)	91,109	70.02
Democratic	Katherine Wodehouse	31,145	23.94
Libertarian	J. C. Anderson	4,768	3.66
Peace and Freedom	Ann Archer	3,037	2.38

1996

1996 California State Assembly district 75 Republican primary
Party	Candidate	Votes	%
Republican	Jan Goldsmith (incumbent)	44,708	100
Total votes		44,708	100

1996 California State Assembly district 75 election
Party	Candidate	Votes	%
Republican	Jan Goldsmith (incumbent)	106,944	71.62
Democratic	Adrian S Kwiatkowski	35,805	23.98
Natural Law	William S. Cowling	6,573	4.40

=== California State Treasurer ===
1998 California State Treasurer Republican primary
Party	Candidate	Votes	%
Republican	Curt Pringle	1,506,892	62.20
Republican	Jan Goldsmith	915,787	37.80
Total votes		2,422,679	100

=== San Diego City Attorney ===
2008 San Diego City Attorney election
Candidate	First-round		Runoff	
Candidate	Votes	%	Votes	%
Jan Goldsmith	68,326	32.22	278,830	52.89
Michael J. Aguirre (incumbent)	61,257	28.89	189,628	40.38
Scott Peters	43,295	20.42		
Brian Maienschein	26,267	12.39		
Amy J. Lepine	12,687	5.98		
Total	212,035	100	469,663	100

2012 San Diego City Attorney election
Candidate	Votes	%
Jan Goldsmith (incumbent)	182,787	97.82
Write-ins	4,066	2.18
Total votes	186,853	100
