= John W. Witt =

American attorney (1932–2018)

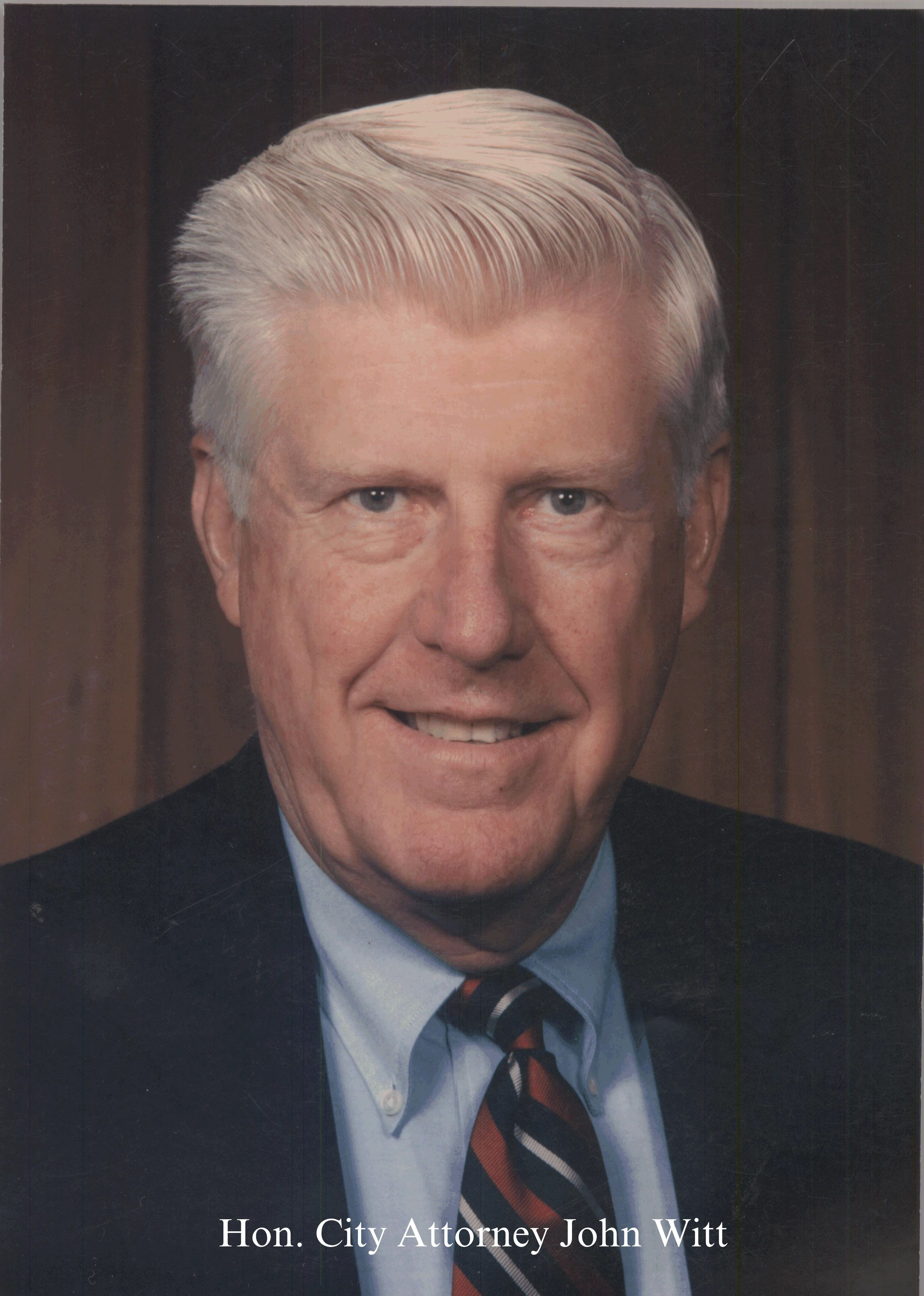

City Attorney of San Diego
- In office 1969–1996
- Preceded by: Ed Butler
- Succeeded by: Casey Gwinn

Personal details
- Born: August 30, 1932 Los Angeles, California, U.S.
- Died: November 4, 2018 (aged 86) San Diego, California, U.S.
- Education: University of Southern California (BA) (J.D.)
- Profession: Lawyer politician

John W. Witt (August 30, 1932 – November 4, 2018) was an American attorney who served as the City Attorney of San Diego, California for 27 years, from 1969 to 1996.

== Early life and education ==
He was born and raised in Los Angeles, the son of John Udo Witt and Alice Josephine Westervelt. He was active in the Boy Scouts of America and earned the rank of Eagle Scout. He graduated from Hollywood High School. He attended the University of Southern California on an NROTC scholarship; he played baseball as a freshman and wrote for the Daily Trojan. Upon receiving his BA degree he was commissioned as an infantry officer in the U.S. Marine Corps, later transferring to the Marine Corps Reserves until he retired with the rank of colonel. He graduated from the University of Southern California School of Law in 1960 and was admitted to the State Bar of California in 1961.

== Career ==
Immediately upon passing the bar in 1961 he went to work in the Office of the City Attorney, serving variously as a prosecutor, civil trial lawyer, and public utility specialist. In 1969 he was appointed to the post of San Diego City Attorney by the San Diego City Council. He was then elected six times. He retired at the end of his seventh term in 1996. He then went into private practice with the firm of Lounsbery Ferguson Altona & Peak.

As city attorney he advised the City Council on legal matters and supervised a staff of 100 attorneys. He is credited with keeping the San Diego Padres in town in 1973, when a move to Washington, D.C. had been proposed; as city attorney he won a legal decision that the new owner would have to pay the club's lease of the city-owned San Diego Stadium through 1989, making any move financially unattractive. The Padres team was then purchased by local businessman Ray Kroc, founder of McDonald's. Witt also served on a Select Committee of the Federal Communications Commission, evaluating government regulation of cable television. He lectured for several years on civil rights law for the Georgetown University Law Center.

== Community service ==
He was active lifelong with the Boy Scouts of America, the Boys & Girls Clubs of San Diego, and Lions International, as well as his local church, Holy Trinity Parish. In 1975 the National Court of Honor of the Boy Scouts presented him with its Distinguished Eagle Scout Award.

== Personal life ==
He married Lenora Jane Ticknor in 1961 and they settled in the Point Loma neighborhood of San Diego. They had three children and four grandchildren.
