= Casey Gwinn =

American attorney

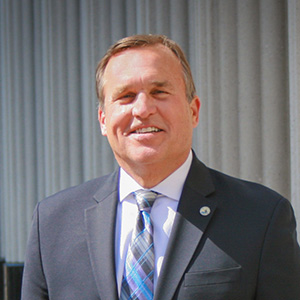
- Casey Gwinn in 2018

City Attorney of San Diego
- In office 1996–2004
- Preceded by: John W. Witt
- Succeeded by: Mike Aguirre

Personal details
- Education: Stanford University (BA); University of California, Los Angeles (JD)
- Profession: Lawyer politician

Casey Gwinn is an American attorney who served as the elected City Attorney of San Diego, California, from 1996 through 2004. He is credited as a pioneer of the Family Justice Center concept, under which multiple agencies work together under one roof to provide services to victims of domestic violence and sexual abuse.

== Early life and education ==
Gwinn grew up on the campus of Mt. Hermon Christian Conference Center, a facility in the Santa Cruz Mountains of Northern California; his father, a Congregational minister, was director of the center. Gwinn graduated from San Lorenzo Valley High School in 1978. He then obtained a political science degree from Stanford University and a J.D. degree from UCLA.

== Career ==
Gwinn went to work for the San Diego City Attorney's office right after law school. He founded the city's Child Abuse/Domestic Violence Unit in August 1986. Starting in 1985 he led the Domestic Violence Unit within the City Attorney's office. He became known as a hard-line prosecutor of domestic violence cases, winning 19 of his first 21 cases and eventually prosecuting more than 10,000 such cases. Gwinn pioneered an approach to domestic violence prosecution known as "evidence-based" prosecution, promoting the investigation and prosecution of cases even if the victim was unable or unwilling to participate with the prosecution. His approach was adopted by jurisdictions across the United States and he became a frequent lecturer for the National District Attorney's Association.

In 1989, Gwinn created the San Diego Task Force Against Domestic Violence with Ashley Walker, the founder of Battered Women's Services at the YWCA of San Diego County. The task force created the first countywide protocols in San Diego County on the investigation and prosecution of domestic violence cases, embracing Gwinn's pro-prosecution approach toward domestic violence offenders.

In August 1989, Gwinn first proposed the creation of a center where all the agencies, government and non-government, would co-locate in one place, allowing adult and child survivors to receive all their services in one place. His proposal was rejected by the district attorney, police chief, and sheriff. Nevertheless, Gwinn, working with fellow prosecutor Gael Strack, began adding on-site partner agencies in the San Diego City Attorney's Office in 1990. In 1991, Gwinn founded the San Diego Domestic Violence Council and served as its first president until 1999.

The collaborative approach in the San Diego City Attorney's Office, which began after Gwinn's proposal for multi-agency center was rejected in 1989, gained national attention in 1993 when his Child Abuse/Domestic Violence Unit was profiled as a model for the nation by the National Council of Juvenile and Family Court Judges. Later in 1993, Gwinn's work was profiled on "NOW" with Tom Brokaw and Katie Couric on NBC.

=== 1996–2004: San Diego City Attorney ===
In 1996, Gwinn was elected San Diego City Attorney, taking leadership of a staff of nearly 330 attorneys, investigators, and support professionals. As City Attorney he led the creation in 2002 of the multi-agency San Diego Family Justice Center serving victims of domestic violence and their children. He had first proposed the concept in 1989. He named Assistant City Attorney Gael Strack to be the first Family Justice Center Director. Along with opening the San Diego Family Justice Center, Gwinn also founded a camping and mentoring program as part of the Center called Camp HOPE San Diego. He argued that children who witnessed domestic violence are more likely to be violent in the future, and goes on to say, "once we increase hope, we can change the trajectory of their lives". He was also strongly against pornography, saying "I have seen a very strong link between pornography and child abuse and sexual assault as a prosecutor for many years." In 2003, his work was on the Oprah Winfrey Show rapidly expanding knowledge of the Family Justice Center framework for helping adult and child victims of abuse. In October 2003, President George W. Bush recognized him as the founder of the Family Justice Center movement and asked him to help develop Family Justice Centers across the United States.

There are now more than 100 Family Justice Centers across the United States as well as centers in more than 20 countries around the world. Family Justice Centers have been identified as a "best practice" in helping domestic violence victims and their children.

After being term-limited out of his position as City Attorney in 2004, he helped to lead President George W. Bush's Family Justice Center Initiative, which over the period 2004–2006 helped to open fifteen Family Justice Centers modeled on the one in San Diego.

=== 2004–present ===
In 2007, Casey Gwinn and Gael Strack were featured on CBS The Early Show with Harry Smith. In 2011, Gwinn and Strack co-founded the Training Institute on Strangulation Prevention, focused on addressing near and non-fatal strangulation cases in domestic violence, sexual assault, elder abuse, and child abuse cases. Gwinn and Strack have argued that non-fatal strangulation cases should be identified as the "edge of a homicide".

In 2013, Gwinn developed a statewide model for Camp HOPE California, bringing children exposed to domestic violence to camp from across the state. In 2015, Camp HOPE America went nationwide under Gwinn's leadership. In 2018, Camp HOPE America operated in 18 states.

He continues to be active in the family justice movement. He is president of Alliance for HOPE International, formerly the Family Justice Center Alliance.

Gwinn and Gael Strack have been recognized for identifying the relationship between domestic violence, trauma-exposed children, and strangulation of women. Gwinn has published or co-published ten books since 2006. In 2015, he published a book, Cheering for the Children, in which he contends that childhood trauma is the number one public health issue in the country.

== Personal ==
He is married and has three children.

== Electoral history ==
1994 San Diego County District Attorney democratic primary
Candidate	Votes	%
Paul Pfingst	129,353	31.40
Larry Stirling	94,093	22.84
Casey Gwinn	89,981	21.85
Ed Miller (incumbent)	55,341	13.44
Mike Schaefer	43,134	10.47
Total votes	411,902	100

1996 San Diego City Attorney election
Candidate	Votes	%
Casey Gwinn	122,559	100
Total votes	122,559	100

2000 San Diego City Attorney election
Candidate	Votes	%
Casey Gwinn	139,620	100
Total votes	139,620	100
