= Keenan & Associates =

Privately held insurance consulting

Keenan & Associates is a privately held insurance consulting and brokerage firm that was founded in 1972 by John Keenan. The firm is based in Torrance, California and is the largest independent broker in California. The firm works with schools, healthcare organizations and municipalities for employee benefits, workers' compensation, health benefit management services, risk management, and property and liability. In April 2013, the Upland City Council appointed Keenan as the Insurance Broker of Record. In April 2017, Keenan became part of AssuredPartners, Inc.

John Keenan is the founder and chairman of Keenan & Associates.

Since it was first established in the 1970s, the company has grown to contain nine offices located throughout California, employing over 750 people.
