= San Diego City Attorney =

Elected official in San Diego, California

City Attorney of San Diego
- Seal of San Diego, California

- Flag of San Diego, California
- Incumbent; Heather Ferbert since December 10, 2024
- Term length: Four years, renewable once
- Inaugural holder: Thomas W. Sutherland
- Formation: 1850
- Salary: $193,648 annually
- Website: Office of the City Attorney

The San Diego City Attorney is an elected official who serves as the chief legal adviser to the City of San Diego. The city attorney is responsible for representing the city government in legal matters and for prosecuting misdemeanor and infractions that occur within city limits. Elected every four years, officeholders may serve up to two terms.

The current city attorney is Heather Ferbert, who has held the office since 2024. She is the second woman to hold the office after her predecessor, Mara Elliott.

== Composition ==
The San Diego City Attorney's Office has four divisions.

- Civil Advisory Division
- Civil Litigation Division
- Criminal Division
- Community Justice Division

== List of City Attorneys ==
The following list shows San Diego City Attorneys since the incorporation of the City of San Diego. From 1852 until 1888 the City government was dissolved due to a bankruptcy and there was no official city attorney.

City Attorney	Term start	Term end
Thomas W. Sutherland	1850	1851
James W. Robinson	1852	1852
Harry L. Titus	1888	1888
James P. Goodwin	1889	1890
William H. Fuller	1891	1894
Herbert E. Doolittle	1895	1904
William R. Andrews	1905	1906
George Puterbaugh	1907	1909
William R. Andrews	1910	1913
Terence B. Cosgrove	1914	1919
Shelley J. Higgins	1919	1927
James O'Keefe	1927	1928
Marvin W. Conkling	1928	1931
Frank H. Heskett	1931	1931
Clinton L. Byers	1931	1936
Dayton L. Ault	1937	1941
Jacob Weinberger	1941	1941
Dayton L. Ault	1941	1942
Clarence J. Novotny	1943	1943
Jean F. Du Paul	1943	1961
Alan M. Firestone	1961	1963
Richard J. Curran	1963	1965
Ed Butler	1965	1969
John W. Witt	1969	1996
Casey Gwinn	1996	2004
Mike Aguirre	2004	2008
Jan Goldsmith	2008	2016
Mara Elliott	2016	2024
Heather Ferbert	2024	Incumbent
