= Del Cerro, San Diego =

- Community of San Diego
- Del Cerro
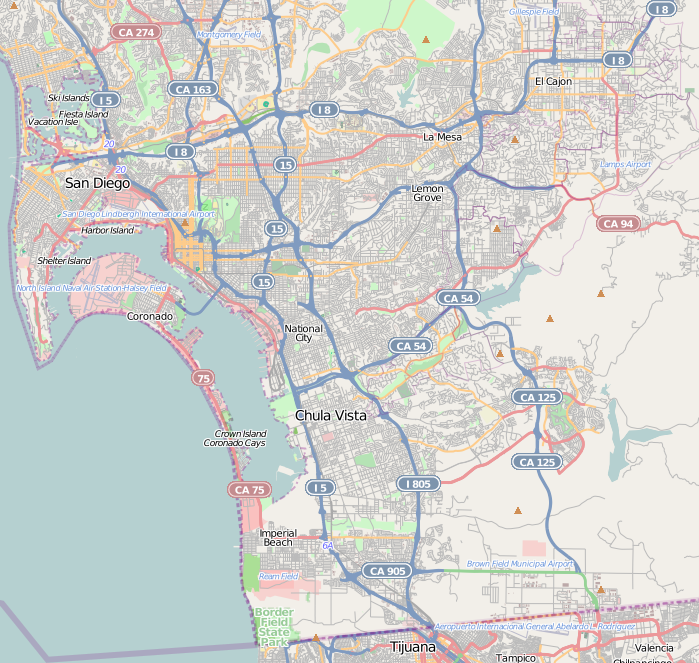
- Location within San Diego
- Coordinates: 32.784167°N 117.071111°W
- Country: United States of America
- State: California
- County: San Diego
- City: San Diego

Del Cerro (Spanish for "of the hill") is an affluent, hilly residential neighborhood of approximately 2,300 residents in the eastern part of San Diego, California. Del Cerro borders the communities of San Carlos, Allied Gardens, College Area, Grantville, and the city of La Mesa, and is adjacent to Lake Murray and San Diego State University (SDSU).

== History ==
The Del Cerro area was developed as a residential suburb during the 1950s, 1960s and 1970s.

In 2007, California State University trustees endorsed a Master Plan proposing to build a housing project for faculty and staff on university-owned undeveloped open space in Del Cerro (at the site of Adobe Falls, a city historic landmark). The plan to expand the university's facilities into Del Cerro was initially proposed in 2005 but was blocked by a judge's ruling. The plan's Environmental Impact Report had been contested since 2005 through litigation brought by the Del Cerro Action Council, the City of San Diego, and others. On February 11, 2010, a judge issued a decision in favor of SDSU, but the city appealed the denial of its writ. The case remains under review at the Court of Appeal.

The area is vulnerable to wildfires, but residents have battled with the city over getting permission to clear brush from slopes and around homes.

== Economy ==
=== Retail ===
The community's commercial center along Del Cerro Blvd. includes a Windmill Farms, a Chevron station with mini-mart, two liquor/deli stores, a Mexican restaurant, fitness spa, dental office, property management company that has been in Del Cerro over 50 years (FBS Property Management) and several other professional services.

=== Tourism ===
The community includes the western end of Mission Trails Regional Park.

== Community ==
=== Community groups ===
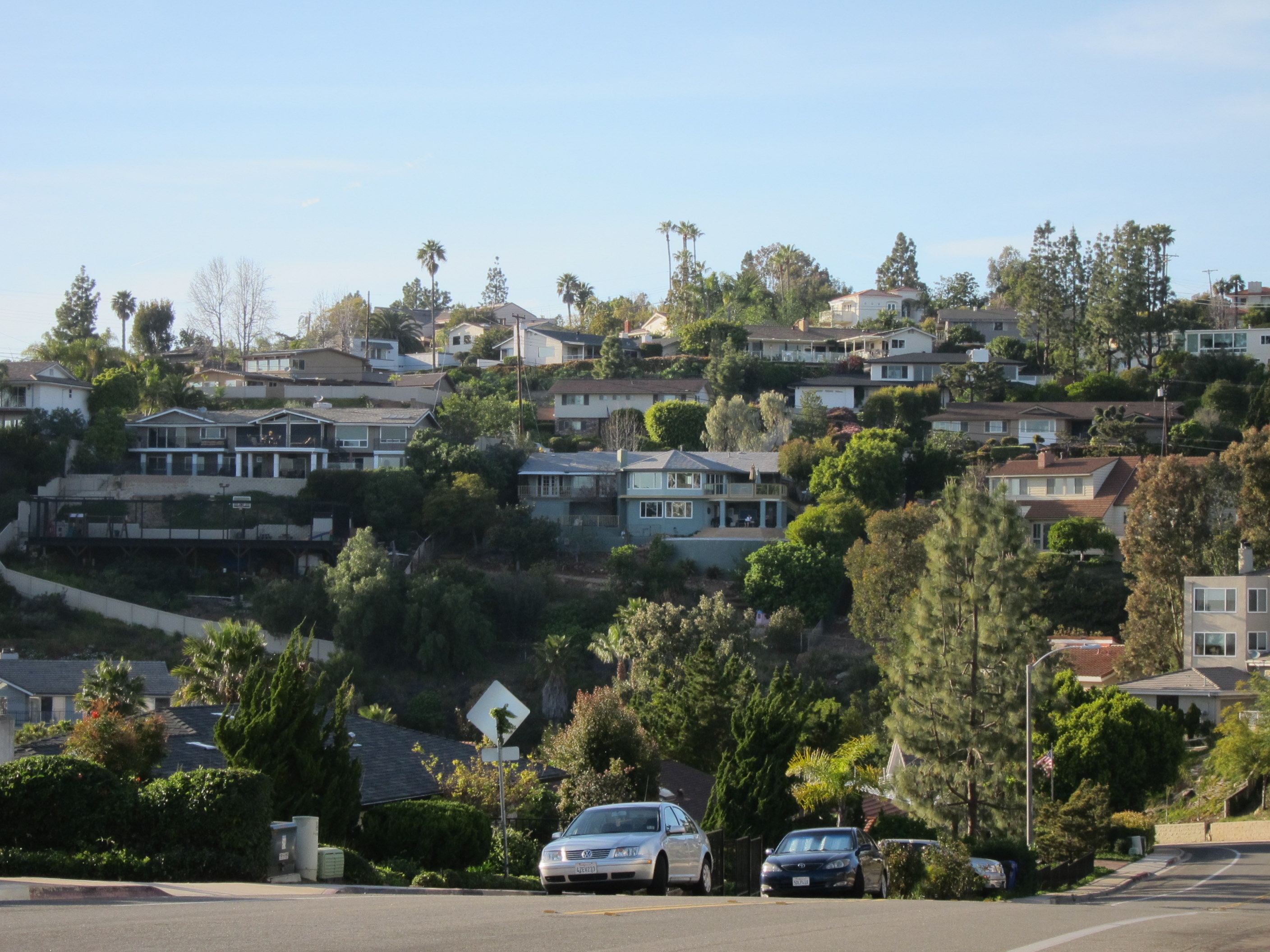
Homes in Del Cerro, pictured from Madra Avenue

Volunteer community groups include the Save Del Cerro coalition, as well as the Del Cerro Action Council. The neighborhood is one of several communities represented by the Navajo Community Planners which advises the mayor and city council on land use issues in the area.

=== Annual events ===
In 2012 a group of volunteers raised over 200k to rebuild the playground at Lake Murray.

A volunteer committee hosts an annual Fourth of July celebration at the Lake Murray Playground, featuring live music, food, games, and a fireworks display.

A Block Party is held annually with live bands, food, and entertainment for children.

The private Del Cerro Park and Pool hosts an annual Fourth of July party with food and games for its membership. The park celebrated its 50th anniversary at the 2011 Fourth of July party.

=== Media ===
The area is served by the Mission Times Courier, a greater area community newspaper delivered to residents and covering Del Cerro news.

== Education ==
- Phoebe A. Hearst Elementary School is located on Del Cerro Blvd.*

== Government ==
Del Cerro is located in City Council District 7 and is currently represented by Councilmember Raul Campillo. For planning purposes the city includes it in the Navajo community planning area.
