= Grantville, San Diego =

Grantville
- Community
- Grantville
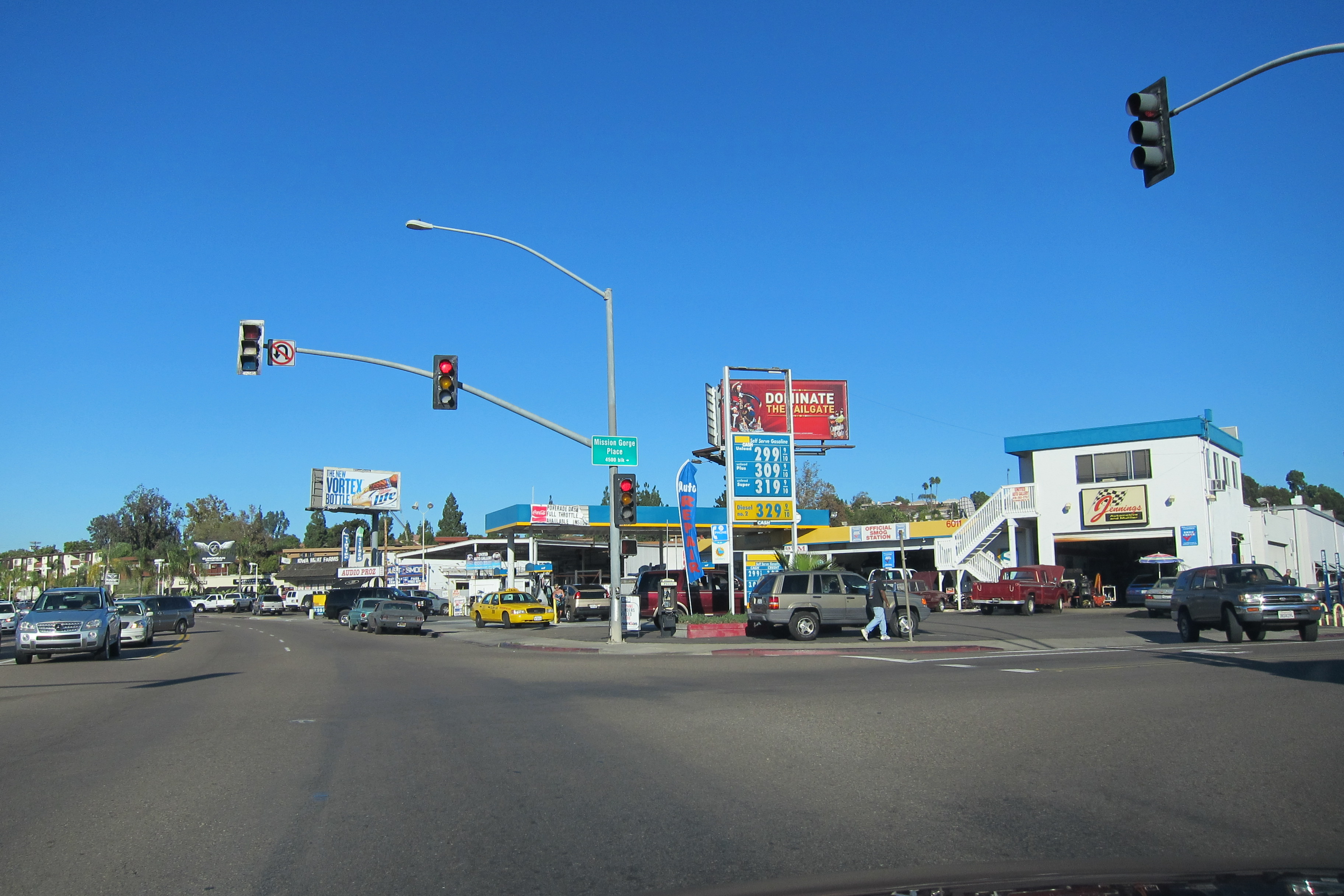
- Grantville Business district

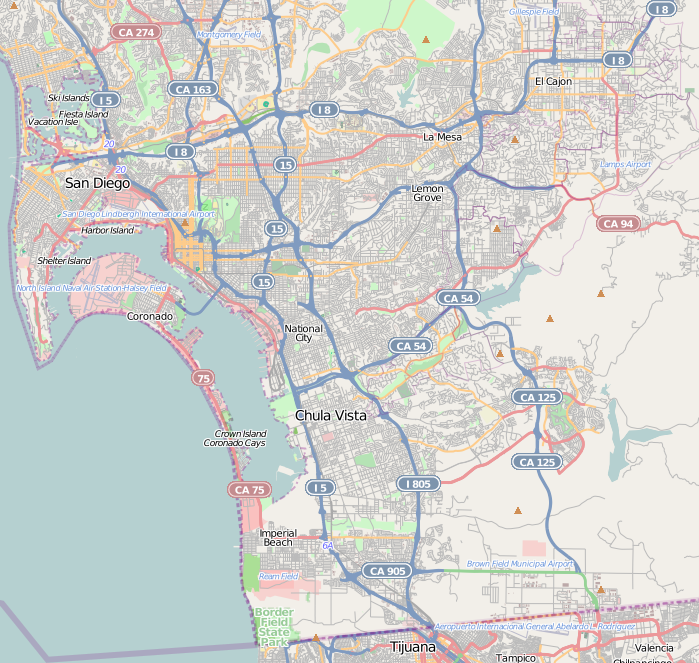
- Location within San Diego
- Coordinates: 32.785556°N 117.098333°W
- Country: United States of America
- State: California
- County: San Diego
- City: San Diego

Grantville is a neighborhood in San Diego, California, United States. It borders the communities of Allied Gardens, San Carlos, Tierrasanta and Mission Valley East.

== History ==
Grantville is one of the oldest communities in San Diego and the State of California. The first European settlement in California was established in San Diego in 1769, in the area which is now Old Town San Diego State Historic Park. The mission itself, Mission San Diego de Alcalá, was moved in 1774 to what is now the Grantville area. The restored Mission is a major landmark and tourist destination in Grantville. It is listed on the National Register of Historic Places.

In the late 1800s the area became referred to as Grantville in honor of U. S. President Ulysses S. Grant. It was annexed to the city of San Diego in a series of moves between 1948 and 1954.

The community is the gateway to Mission Trails Regional Park, established in 1974.

Grantville was the focus of the Grantville Redevelopment Project Area, established by the city of San Diego in 2005. However, all redevelopment areas were dissolved in 2012 by the state of California. The City of San Diego assumed responsibility for any remaining redevelopment projects in the area.

== Government ==
Grantville is part of the Navajo Community Plan, and the Navajo Community Planners group advises the city on land use and other issues affecting Grantville. The community is located within the 7th City Council District currently represented by Councilman Raul Campillo.

== Transportation ==
Its main roads are Friars Road (which also serves Mission Valley) and Mission Gorge Road which leads into Mission Trails Regional Park to the north and continues south of Interstate 8 where it merges with Fairmount Avenue. Grantville is also served by public transit including San Diego Transit buses along major arteries and the San Diego Trolley's Green Line, whose Grantville station is situated on Alvarado Canyon Road near Fairmount Avenue adjacent to Interstate 8.

== Schools ==
Grantville is served by San Diego Unified School District. The area contains Foster Elementary School and Lewis Middle School. Grantville students attend Patrick Henry High School in nearby Del Cerro.

== Religious Institutions ==
Christian:

- Flood Church
- Mission Church of the Nazarene
- Grove Church
- Mission Valley Christian Fellowship

== Businesses ==
Grantville is primarily a commercial and light industrial neighborhood, containing businesses ranging from recording studios to a Home Depot, as well as dozens of small retail business, service firms, and factories. The Kaiser Permanente Hospital and its associated clinics and offices are a major employer. Grantville is home to several craft breweries including San Diego Brewing Company, Benchmark, and Groundswell. A popular destination is Irish pub McGregor's Grill. Mission Times Courier community newspaper covers Grantville news.
