= Brian Maienschein =

American politician (born 1969)

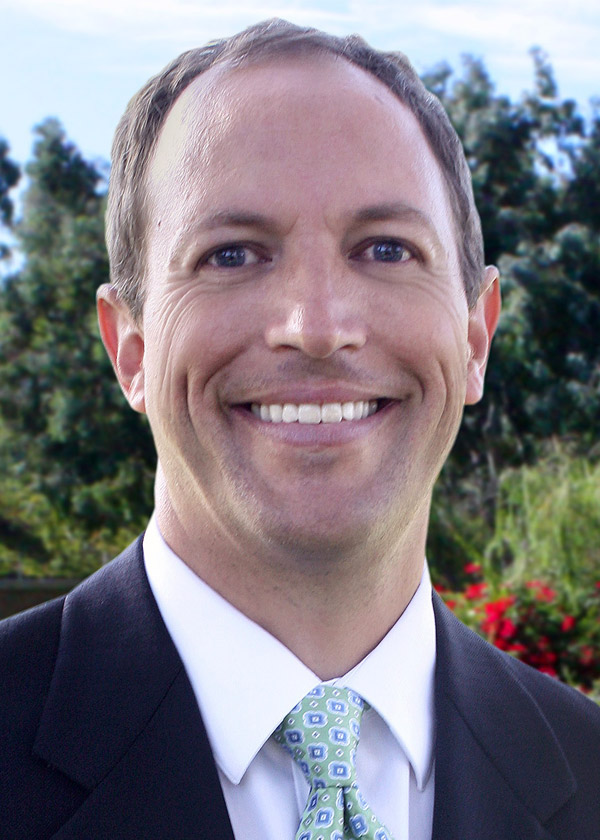
- Official portrait, 2009

Member of the California State Assembly
- In office December 3, 2012 – November 30, 2024
- Preceded by: Brian Jones (redistricted)
- Succeeded by: Darshana Patel
- Constituency: 77th district (2012–2022); 76th district (2022–2024)

Member of San Diego City Council from the 5th district
- In office December 2000 – December 2008
- Preceded by: Barbara Warden
- Succeeded by: Carl DeMaio

Personal details
- Born: May 22, 1969 (age 57) Independence, Missouri, U.S.
- Party: Democratic (2019–present)
- Other political affiliations: Republican (before 2019)
- Spouse: Elly Maienschein
- Children: 2
- Education: University of California, Santa Barbara (BA); California Western School of Law (JD)

Brian Kurt Maienschein (born May 22, 1969) is an American attorney and politician who served in the California State Assembly from 2012 to 2024, representing the 76th district, which encompasses parts of northeastern San Diego. Initially elected as a Republican, Maienschein switched to the Democratic Party in 2019, and was re-elected twice as a Democrat. Before serving in the state assembly, he was a member of the San Diego City Council, and the city's first Commissioner on Homelessness.

Maienschein unsuccessfully ran for San Diego City Attorney in 2024. In September 2025, he joined Brownstein Hyatt Farber Schreck's California state government relations team.

== Early life and education ==
Maienschein graduated from the University of California, Santa Barbara in 1991 with a bachelor of arts degree in communications. He returned to San Diego to attend California Western School of Law. He clerked for Judge Norbert Ehrenfreud focusing on the mental health calendar in San Diego. Maienschein also teaches a course on Election Law at USD School of Law.

== Career ==
After passing the bar, Maienschein worked as a business attorney in private practice and became actively engaged with the community. Maienschein helped develop San Diego's Community Youth Court, bringing together community service agencies, schools, and law enforcement to provide intervention and help first-time juvenile offenders. Maienschein served as the Community Youth Court's Executive Director and received the District Attorney's Crime Victims' Rights Award in 1999. The program has since been transitioned into the San Diego Youth Commission.

=== San Diego City Council ===
Maienschein was elected to the San Diego City Council in November 2000 with 63% of the vote, the most ever received by a non-incumbent, and was re-elected without opposition in 2004.

In 2003 and 2007, wildfires swept through the district, devastating homes and businesses. Maienschein walked the burned-out neighborhood streets himself before constituents were allowed to return, developing a list of homes and businesses that had been destroyed. In response to the fires, Maienschein created a one-stop disaster hub for victims to support and streamline rebuilding efforts, bringing together the all the government agencies and services for those impacted by fires. The plan and programs Maienschein created are still national models for disaster response.

=== Homelessness Commissioner ===
On January 5, 2009, the United Way appointed Maienschein as San Diego's first "Commissioner of the Plan to End Chronic Homelessness" (also called the Homelessness Commissioner). In that role, Maienschein created Project 25, an innovative pilot program for people experiencing homelessness coupling permanent housing with intensive individualized support, including a medical home. The program's mission was to show how housing and medical care, when delivered in concert, could improve health and housing outcomes for vulnerable people while reducing costs.

Leading both the fundraising and coordination efforts, Maienschein worked with more than 20 organizations including the United Way, St. Vincent de Paul, the San Diego Housing Commission, the County of San Diego, the City of San Diego, and area hospitals, among others.

Project 25 launched in 2011, serving 35 individuals experiencing homelessness who had been identified as the most frequent users of public services, including emergency rooms, hospitals, jails, and ambulances.

=== California State Assembly ===
In 2011, Maienschein announced he would run for the 77th District seat in the California State Assembly. He was elected on November 6, 2012, with more than 60% of the vote, and was sworn in on December 3, 2012. Maienschein served as Vice Chair of both the Health and Human Services Committees. In addition, Maienschein served on the Housing, Judiciary, and Business, Professions, and Consumer Protection Committees.

Maienschein was reelected in 2014, winning more than 65% in the primary election and then 70% of the vote in the general election on November 4, 2014. In 2015, Maienschein was named the Chair of the Assembly Local Government Committee – the only Republican appointed to lead a committee in the California legislature. In addition to chairing the Local Government Committee, Maienschein served again as vice-chair of the Health and Human Services Committees, as well as serving on the Housing, Judiciary and Business, Professions and Consumer Protection Committees. After the term, Maienschein had 25 bills signed into law – the most bills amongst the San Diego delegation.

In 2016, Maienschein was re-elected to his third term in the California State Assembly. During the two-year term, Maienschein served as vice-chair of the Health Committee and served on the Housing and Community Development, Judiciary, and Government Organization Committees. This year, Maienschein was the lead Republican negotiator in renewing the Managed Care Organization (MCO) tax, which helped save Medi-Cal.

Maienschein was re-elected on November 6, 2018, by 607 votes. On January 24, 2019, Maienschein announced he switched his political party affiliation to the Democratic party. Maienschein penned an op-ed in the San Diego Union-Tribune explaining the switch.

Maienschein was reelected to the California State Assembly on November 3, 2020. He was narrowly reelected in 2022. He serves on the Communications and Conveyance, Health, Judiciary, and Rules Committees.

==== Legislation ====
Maienschein has been a strong advocate for child safety laws. In 2014, Maienschein passed AB 230, which requires youth sports leagues to disclose their background check policies to parents and whether or not they include federal and state-level criminal histories.

Assembly District 77 has a large Navy population, and Maienschein has made it a priority to advocate for the families of active and retired service members. In 2013, Maienschein introduced AB 186, which made it easier for military spouses to obtain a temporary professional or vocational license, allowing them to find work and support their families while stationed in California.

In 2018, Maienschein's AB 2193 was signed into law, requiring obstetric providers including OB/GYNs, family practice providers, and nurse practitioners to either confirm screening has occurred or screen for maternal mental health disorders at least once during the perinatal period. AB 2193 also requires health plans and health insurers to create programs to address these maternal mental health disorders.

Also in 2018, Maienschein took action to expand protections against human trafficking. AB 2105 allows courts to triple any fine, add a civil penalty, or damage award regarding the purchase of sex from a minor.

Maienschein addressed California's housing crisis in 2019 by authoring AB 960. This bill allows CalWORKS recipients to use housing assistance vouchers in a shared housing setting, such as staying with family and friends, rather than solely at motels and hotels.

In 2019, the community of Poway was devastated by the Poway synagogue shooting, which injured 3 and killed 1. Maienschein responded to this tragedy by authoring AB 1548. This bill established a grant program for nonprofits at high risk of terrorist attacks to access funding for security.

In 2020, Maienschein authored AB 856, which helps active military service members and their families access a broader range of community college courses offered on military bases by waiving open course provisions.

In the fall of 2021, the community of Rancho Bernardo was proposed as the placement for a sexually violent predator (SVP). In joining the community in opposition to the placement, Maienschein found various flaws in the law regarding where an SVP can be placed. In response, Maienschein introduced AB 1641 in 2022, which placed restrictions on where an SVP can be housed in a community. However, the bill was heavily amended before passage, and the final version only required GPS monitoring of sexually violent predators until they are legally discharged.

As of 2021, Maienschein has authored 107 bills into law.

=== 2024 San Diego City Attorney campaign ===
Maienschein ran an unsuccessful campaign for San Diego City Attorney in 2024, losing to Chief Deputy City Attorney Heather Ferbert.

=== Later career ===
In September 2025, Brownstein Hyatt Farber Schreck announced Maienschein had joined the firm's California state government relations team.

== Personal life ==
Maienschein lives in San Diego with his wife, Elly, and daughters, Taylin and Brenna. He also teaches election law at the University of San Diego School of Law.

In July 2013, The San Diego Union-Tribune reported that Maienschein was dating California Medical Association lobbyist Carolyn Ginno and that the relationship had been to disclosed to and cleared by the assembly's ethics committee.

== Electoral history ==
=== 2014 California State Assembly ===
California's 77th State Assembly district election, 2014
Primary election
Party	Candidate	Votes	%
Republican	Brian Maienschein (incumbent)	57,147	70.6
Democratic	Ruben "RJ" Hernandez	23,821	29.4
Total votes		80,968	100.0
General election
Republican	Brian Maienschein (incumbent)	82,987	65.8
Democratic	Ruben "RJ" Hernandez	43,038	34.2
Total votes		126,025	100.0
Republican hold			

=== 2018 California State Assembly ===
California's 77th State Assembly district election, 2018
Primary election
Party	Candidate	Votes	%
Republican	Brian Maienschein (incumbent)	63,269	56.1
Democratic	Sunday Gover	49,554	43.9
Total votes		112,823	100.0
General election
Republican	Brian Maienschein (incumbent)	99,880	50.2
Democratic	Sunday Gover	99,273	49.8
Total votes		199,153	100.0
Republican hold			

=== 2020 California State Assembly ===
2020 California's 77th State Assembly district election
Primary election
Party	Candidate	Votes	%
Democratic	Brian Maienschein (incumbent)	86,998	57.5
Republican	June Yang Cutter	64,384	42.5
Total votes		151,382	100.0
General election
Democratic	Brian Maienschein (incumbent)	149,367	55.8
Republican	June Yang Cutter	118,396	44.2
Total votes		267,763	100.0
Democratic hold			

=== 2022 California State Assembly ===
2022 California's 76th State Assembly district election
Primary election
Party	Candidate	Votes	%
Democratic	Brian Maienschein (incumbent)	48,635	49.9
Republican	Kristie Bruce-Lane	27,375	28.1
Republican	June Cutter	21,381	22.0
Total votes		97,391	100.0
General election
Democratic	Brian Maienschein (incumbent)	78,895	51.6
Republican	Kristie Bruce-Lane	73,944	48.4
Total votes		152,839	100.0
Democratic hold			

== See also ==
- 2004 San Diego City Council election
- List of party switchers in the United States
