= Allied Gardens, San Diego =

Coordinates: 32.801615°N 117.07058°W

Allied Gardens is a residential neighborhood in the eastern Navajo community of San Diego, California. It neighbors San Carlos to the east, Del Cerro to the south, the College Area to the southeast and Grantville to the southwest.

== History ==
In conjunction with Grantville, Allied Gardens began to see development with the relocation of the Mission de Alcalá in 1774.Allied Gardens was developed by Louis L. Kelton and Walter Bollenbacher in 1955. They purchased the 1,000 acres (400 ha; 4.0 km^{2}) from the Waring estate. Their original business name was the Allied Contractors, hence the name.

The region's recreation center used to hold two radio towers owned by Marrieta Broadcasting Company. However, after the towers were relocated, the land returned to the city. After community organization and effort, the city built the family recreation center.

In February of 2024, Allied Gardens opened the very first city-funded off-leash dog park in District 7, aptly named Allied Gardens Off-Leash Dog Park. The park is located by the Allied Gardens Pool. The park was created with support from the local Navajo community and City Councilman Raul Campillo.

== Facilities ==
The Allied Gardens Recreation Center and Allied Gardens Pool are located on Greenbrier Avenue, next to Lewis Middle School. Further down the hill, just off Greenbrier on Estrella, are the community Little League fields. The area has a small business district located on Waring Road between Orcutt and Zion, where it borders the community of Grantville. The abundance of parks and schools in the community has resulted in a very family-friendly reputation.

== Businesses ==
Allied Gardens is primarily a family neighborhood, but does contain several businesses, service firms, and restaurants.

== Education ==
The area is served by the San Diego Unified School District. The neighborhood contains Foster Elementary School, Marvin Elementary School, and Lewis Middle School. Older students from the area attend Patrick Henry High School, located between San Carlos and Del Cerro on Wandermere Ave.

== Governance ==
The area is part of City Council District 7, represented by Councilman Raul Campillo. It is part of the Navajo Community Planning Area. In 2005 the City Council granted the area status as a redevelopment area.
