= San Carlos, San Diego =

- Community of San Diego
- San Carlos
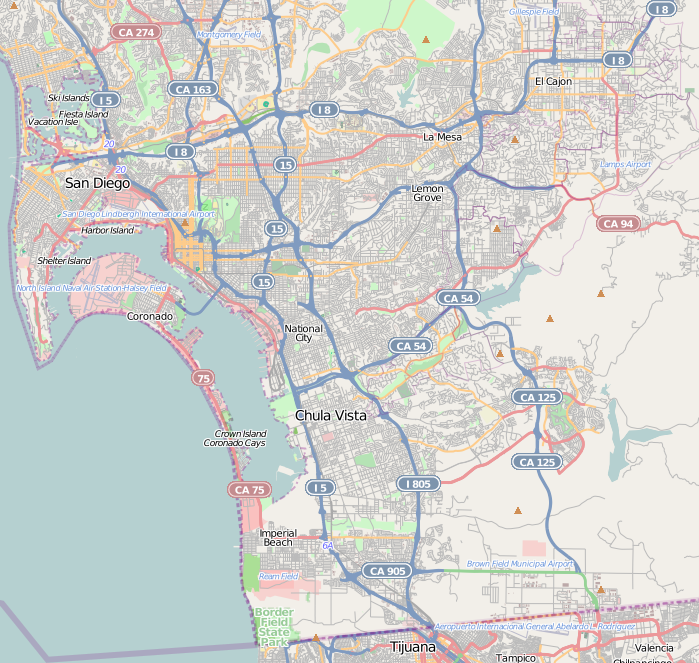
- Location within San Diego
- Coordinates: 32.808486°N 117.032976°W
- Country: United States of America
- State: California
- County: San Diego
- City: San Diego

San Carlos is a neighborhood in the eastern area of San Diego, California. It borders the neighborhoods of Del Cerro, Tierrasanta, Allied Gardens, the city of La Mesa, and Mission Trails Regional Park. The neighborhood extends to Cowles Mountain at the north.

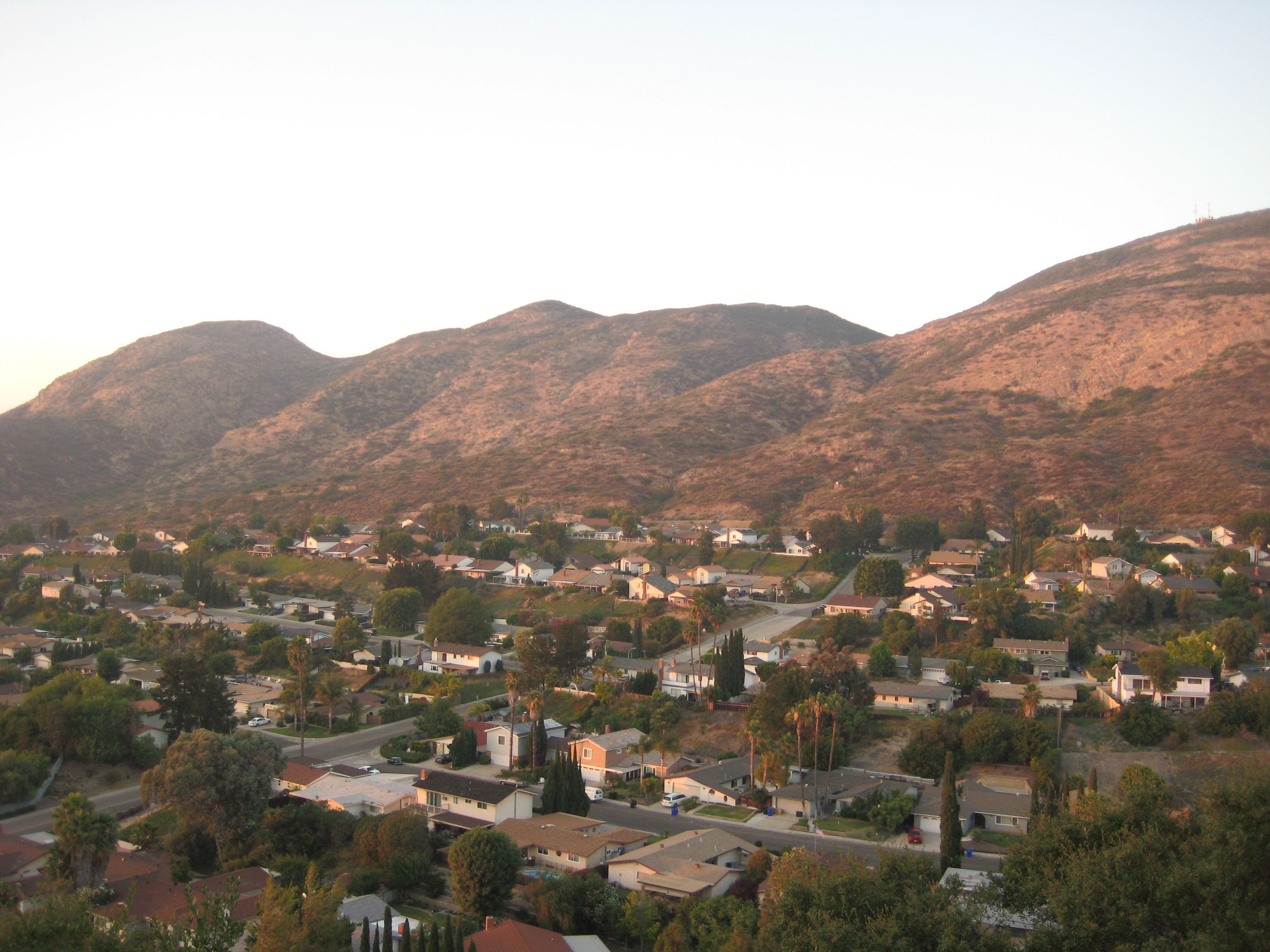
Cowles Mountain and San Carlos neighborhood, San Diego, California, 2010

San Carlos is geographically defined largely by its proximity to Mission Trails Regional Park and to the man-made reservoir Lake Murray. The area consists primarily of single-family homes.

== History ==
The area was developed by Carlos Tavares, after whom it was named, and it was founded in 1970. Carlos Tavares also named Clairemont in reference to his wife Claire.

San Carlos is home to an annual Independence Day fireworks show and music festival. The event is operated and funded by a volunteer committee.

== Government ==
San Carlos is in the 7th City Council District and is represented by Councilmember Raul Campillo.

== Education ==
The neighborhood is served by San Diego Unified School District. It contains Daillard Elementary School, Gage Elementary School, Green Elementary School, Benchley/Weinberger Elementary School, Pershing Middle School, and Patrick Henry High School, which serves all three neighboring communities of San Carlos, Allied Gardens, and Del Cerro.

== Facilities ==
Community centers include the city-owned San Carlos Recreation Center, which opened in 1970. There also is a privately owned park known as Del Cerro Park and Pool. Lake Murray Community Park, Mission Trails Regional Park Lake Murray, and Lake Murray Tennis Club are also very popular recreational locations.

== Local newspaper ==
- Mission Times Courier, community newspaper delivered to and covering San Carlos news.
