= 2013–2014 San Diego mayoral special election =

- November 19, 2013 and February 11, 2014
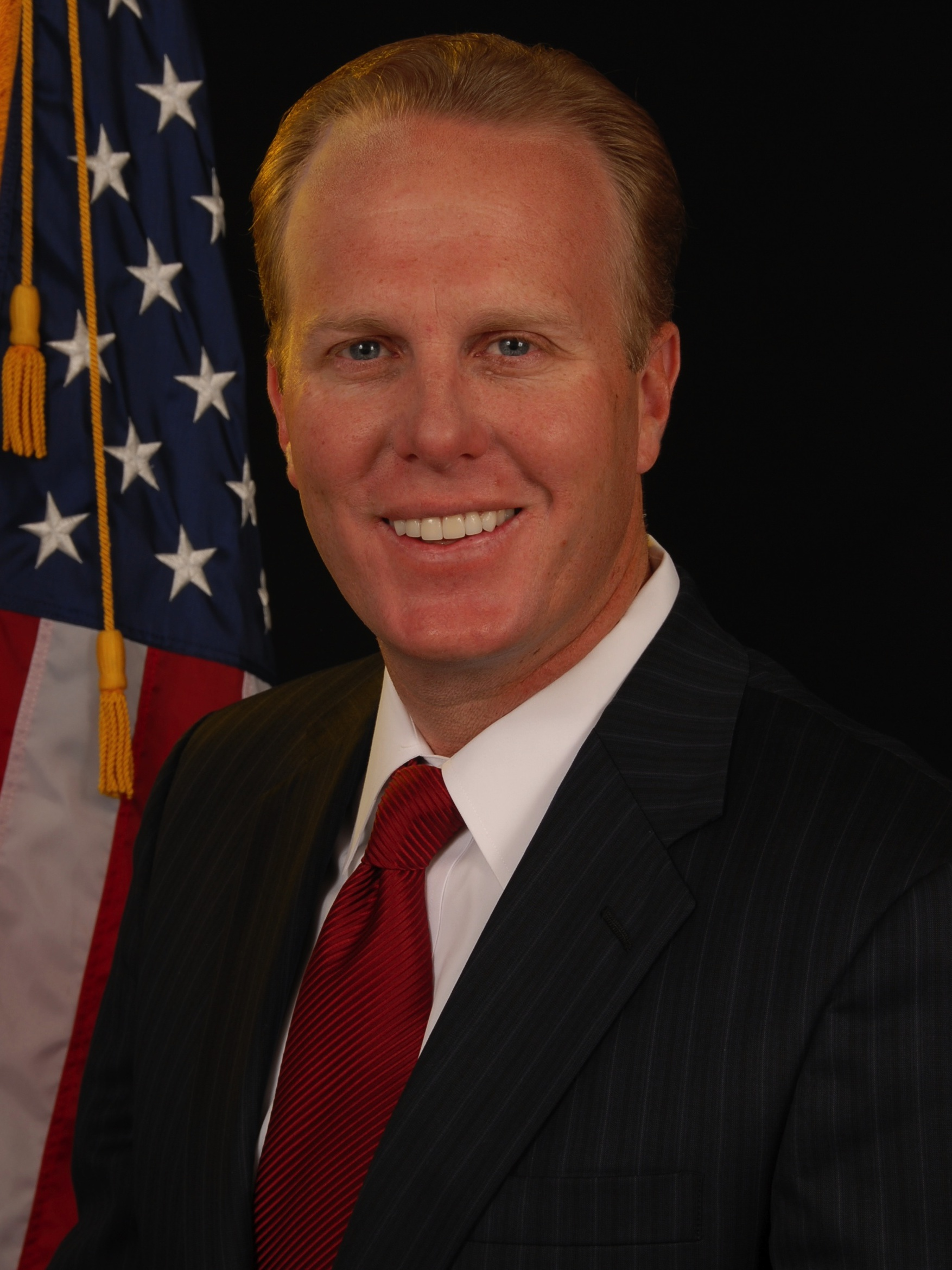

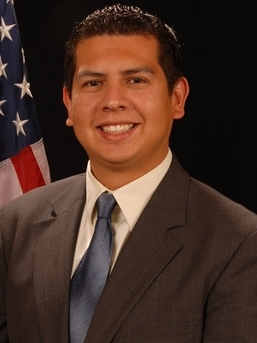
Candidate	Kevin Faulconer	David Alvarez
Party	Republican	Democratic
Vote	153,491	136,701
Percentage	52.9%	47.1%
- Results by city council district Faulconer: 50–60% 60–70% 70–80% Alvarez: 60–70% 70–80%
Mayor before election
Todd Gloria (acting)
Democratic
Elected Mayor
Kevin Faulconer
Republican

The 2013–2014 San Diego mayoral special election was a special election to elect the mayor of San Diego. The election was made necessary by the resignation of Bob Filner on August 30, 2013. The winner stood to serve out the balance of Filner's term, which ended in 2016.

The election was nonpartisan, in accordance with the California Constitution, and candidates appeared on the ballot with no party affiliation, although most chose to state a political party affiliation. A primary election was held on November 19, 2013. Since no candidate received a majority of the vote in the first round, a runoff election was held between the top two vote-getters on February 11, 2014. In the runoff, Kevin Faulconer defeated David Alvarez.

== Filner's resignation ==
In July 2013, Filner was accused of sexual harassment by multiple women. Despite continuing pressure to resign, he remained in office until he and the city reached a mediated agreement in August 2013, under which he agreed to resign and the city of San Diego agreed to help pay his legal fees. According to the city charter, Todd Gloria, the president of the San Diego City Council, served as interim mayor until a new mayor was sworn into office.

== Candidates ==
=== Declared ===
- Mike Aguirre, former San Diego city attorney
- David Alvarez, San Diego city councilman
- Hud Collins, lawyer
- Bruce Coons, executive director of Save Our Heritage Organisation
- Harry Dirks, business administrator and realtor
- Kevin Faulconer, San Diego city councilman
- Nathan Fletcher, former state assemblyman and mayoral candidate in 2012
- Michael Kemmer, student
- Sina "Simon" Moghadam, businessman and engineer
- Tobiah Pettus, construction superintendent and mayoral candidate in 2012
- Lincoln Pickard, retired contractor and gun rights advocate

=== Declined ===
- Toni Atkins, Majority Leader of the California State Assembly and former Acting Mayor
- Ruben Barrales, former aide to George W. Bush, former CEO of the San Diego Regional Chamber of Commerce
- Carl DeMaio, former San Diego City Councilman and mayoral candidate in 2012 (running for Congress)
- Bonnie Dumanis, San Diego County District Attorney and mayoral candidate in 2012
- Donna Frye, former San Diego city councilwoman and mayoral candidate in 2004 and 2005
- Todd Gloria, interim mayor of San Diego and president of San Diego City Council
- Jan Goldsmith, San Diego City Attorney
- Lorena Gonzalez, state assemblywoman
- William Gore, San Diego County Sheriff
- Christine Kehoe, former state senator
- Ron Roberts, San Diego County Supervisor and mayoral candidate in 1992, 2000, and 2004
- Matt Romney, investor and son of Mitt Romney
- Lori Saldaña, former state assemblywoman

== Special election ==
In the special election held November 19, 2013, Kevin Faulconer received 43.6 percent of the vote and David Alvarez received 25.6 percent. The two of them advanced to a runoff election on February 11, 2014. Nathan Fletcher narrowly missed the runoff with 24.3 percent of the vote, just as he had when he previously run in the 2012 mayoral election. Mike Aguirre placed a distant fourth with 4.4 percent. The other eight candidates each received less than 1 percent of the vote each.

=== Polling ===
Poll source	Date(s) administered	Sample size	Margin of error	Mike Aguirre	David Alvarez	Kevin Faulconer	Nathan Fletcher	Other	Undecided
SurveyUSA	November 11–14, 2013	510	±4.4%	7%	22%	40%	24%	4%	3%
SurveyUSA	October 28–31, 2013	550	±4.3%	7%	17%	41%	28%	3%	4%
SurveyUSA	October 7–10, 2013	513	±4.4%	8%	20%	28%	32%	4%	8%
SurveyUSA	September 19–23, 2013	527	±4.4%	9%	17%	22%	30%	6% (Note: Bruce Coons 2%, Other 4%)	15%

=== Debate ===
2013–2014 San Diego mayoral special election debate
No.	Date	Host	Moderator	Link	Democratic	Democratic	Republican	Democratic
Key: P Participant A Absent N Not invited I Invited W Withdrawn								
Key: P Participant A Absent N Not invited I Invited W Withdrawn					Mike Aguirre	David Alvarez	Kevin Faulconer	Nathan Fletcher
1	Oct. 14, 2013	10News; KPBS; San Diego State University School of Public Affairs	Virginia Cha; Peggy Pico	YouTube	P	P	P	P

=== Results ===
Although local elections are officially non-partisan per the California constitution, major candidates typically publicly align themselves with political parties. Therefore, political preference of candidates is indicated in the table below where it is known.

2013–2014 San Diego mayoral special election
Party	Candidate	Votes	%
Republican	Kevin Faulconer	101,953	42.1%
Democratic	David Alvarez	65,740	27.1%
Democratic	Nathan Fletcher	58,355	24.1%
Democratic	Mike Aguirre	10,783	4.5%
Republican	Lincoln Pickard	1,144	0.5%
Democratic	Bruce Coons	1,012	0.4%
Nonpartisan	Sina "Simon" Moghadam	748	0.3%
Nonpartisan	Hud Collins	647	0.3%
Nonpartisan	Michael Kemmer	612	0.3%
Nonpartisan	Harry Dirks	434	0.2%
Nonpartisan	Tobiah Pettus	344	0.1%
Nonpartisan	Farrah Pirahanchi (write-in)	5	0.0%
Total votes		242,828	100%

== Special run-off election ==
On February 11, 2014, Kevin Faulconer received 52.9 percent majority in the run-off vote and was elected mayor of San Diego.

=== Polling ===
Poll source	Date(s) administered	Sample size	Margin of error	Kevin Faulconer	David Alvarez	Undecided
SurveyUSA	February 3–6, 2014	639	± 4%	47%	46%	7%
SurveyUSA	January 20–23, 2014	646	± 3.9%	49%	44%	7%
Public Policy Polling	January 13–14, 2014	526	± 4.3%	45%	46%	9%
SurveyUSA	January 4–9, 2014	800	± 4.3%	53%	37%	10%
SurveyUSA	December 2–5, 2013	515	± 4.4%	47%	46%	7%
SurveyUSA	November 11–14, 2013	510	± 4.4%	51%	38%	11%
SurveyUSA	October 28–31, 2013	550	± 4.3%	52%	36%	12%
SurveyUSA	October 7–10, 2013	513	± 4.4%	44%	35%	21%
SurveyUSA	September 19–23, 2013	527	± 4.4%	38%	35%	26%

Hypothetical polling

With Aguirre

Poll source	Date(s) administered	Sample size	Margin of error	Mike Aguirre	David Alvarez	Undecided
SurveyUSA	November 11–14, 2013	510	± 4.4%	29%	46%	25%
SurveyUSA	October 28–31, 2013	550	± 4.3%	31%	43%	26%
SurveyUSA	October 7–10, 2013	513	± 4.4%	23%	46%	31%
SurveyUSA	September 19–23, 2013	527	± 4.4%	32%	40%	28%

Poll source	Date(s) administered	Sample size	Margin of error	Mike Aguirre	Kevin Faulconer	Undecided
SurveyUSA	November 11–14, 2013	510	± 4.4%	28%	55%	16%
SurveyUSA	October 28–31, 2013	550	± 4.3%	25%	59%	16%
SurveyUSA	October 7–10, 2013	513	± 4.4%	27%	53%	20%
SurveyUSA	September 19–23, 2013	527	± 4.4%	35%	42%	23%

Poll source	Date(s) administered	Sample size	Margin of error	Mike Aguirre	Nathan Fletcher	Undecided
SurveyUSA	November 11–14, 2013	510	± 4.4%	30%	46%	24%
SurveyUSA	October 28–31, 2013	550	± 4.3%	27%	54%	19%
SurveyUSA	October 7–10, 2013	513	± 4.4%	25%	54%	20%
SurveyUSA	September 19–23, 201	527	± 4.4%	23%	53%	24%

With DeMaio

Poll source	Date(s) administered	Sample size	Margin of error	Carl DeMaio	Nathan Fletcher	Undecided
SurveyUSA	July 16–18, 2013	564	± 4.2%	41%	42%	16%

Poll source	Date(s) administered	Sample size	Margin of error	Carl DeMaio	Donna Frye	Undecided
SurveyUSA	July 16–18, 2013	564	± 4.2%	51%	33%	16%

Poll source	Date(s) administered	Sample size	Margin of error	Carl DeMaio	Todd Gloria	Undecided
SurveyUSA	July 16–18, 2013	564	± 4.2%	50%	29%	21%

With Fletcher

Poll source	Date(s) administered	Sample size	Margin of error	David Alvarez	Nathan Fletcher	Undecided
SurveyUSA	November 11–14, 2013	510	± 4.4%	38%	42%	20%
SurveyUSA	October 28–31, 2013	550	± 4.3%	31%	51%	18%
SurveyUSA	October 7–10, 2013	513	± 4.4%	29%	49%	22%
SurveyUSA	September 19–23, 2013	527	± 4.4%	24%	52%	24%

Poll source	Date(s) administered	Sample size	Margin of error	Kevin Faulconer	Nathan Fletcher	Undecided
SurveyUSA	November 11–14, 2013	510	± 4.4%	47%	38%	14%
SurveyUSA	October 28–31, 2013	550	± 4.3%	46%	41%	12%
SurveyUSA	October 7–10, 2013	513	± 4.4%	36%	46%	17%
SurveyUSA	September 19–23, 2013	527	± 4.4%	30%	44%	26%
SurveyUSA	July 16–18, 2013	564	± 4.2%	24%	50%	26%

With Frye

Poll source	Date(s) administered	Sample size	Margin of error	Kevin Faulconer	Donna Frye	Undecided
SurveyUSA	July 16–18, 2013	564	± 4.2%	40%	37%	23%

With Gloria

Poll source	Date(s) administered	Sample size	Margin of error	Kevin Faulconer	Todd Gloria	Undecided
SurveyUSA	July 16–18, 2013	564	± 4.2%	36%	30%	34%

With Goldsmith

Poll source	Date(s) administered	Sample size	Margin of error	Nathan Fletcher	Jan Goldsmith	Undecided
SurveyUSA	July 16–18, 2013	564	± 4.2%	47%	28%	25%

=== Results ===
2013–14 San Diego mayoral special election runoff
Party	Candidate	Votes	%
Republican	Kevin Faulconer	153,491	52.9%
Democratic	David Alvarez	136,701	47.1%
Total votes		290,192	100%
