= 2012 San Diego mayoral election =

- November 6, 2012
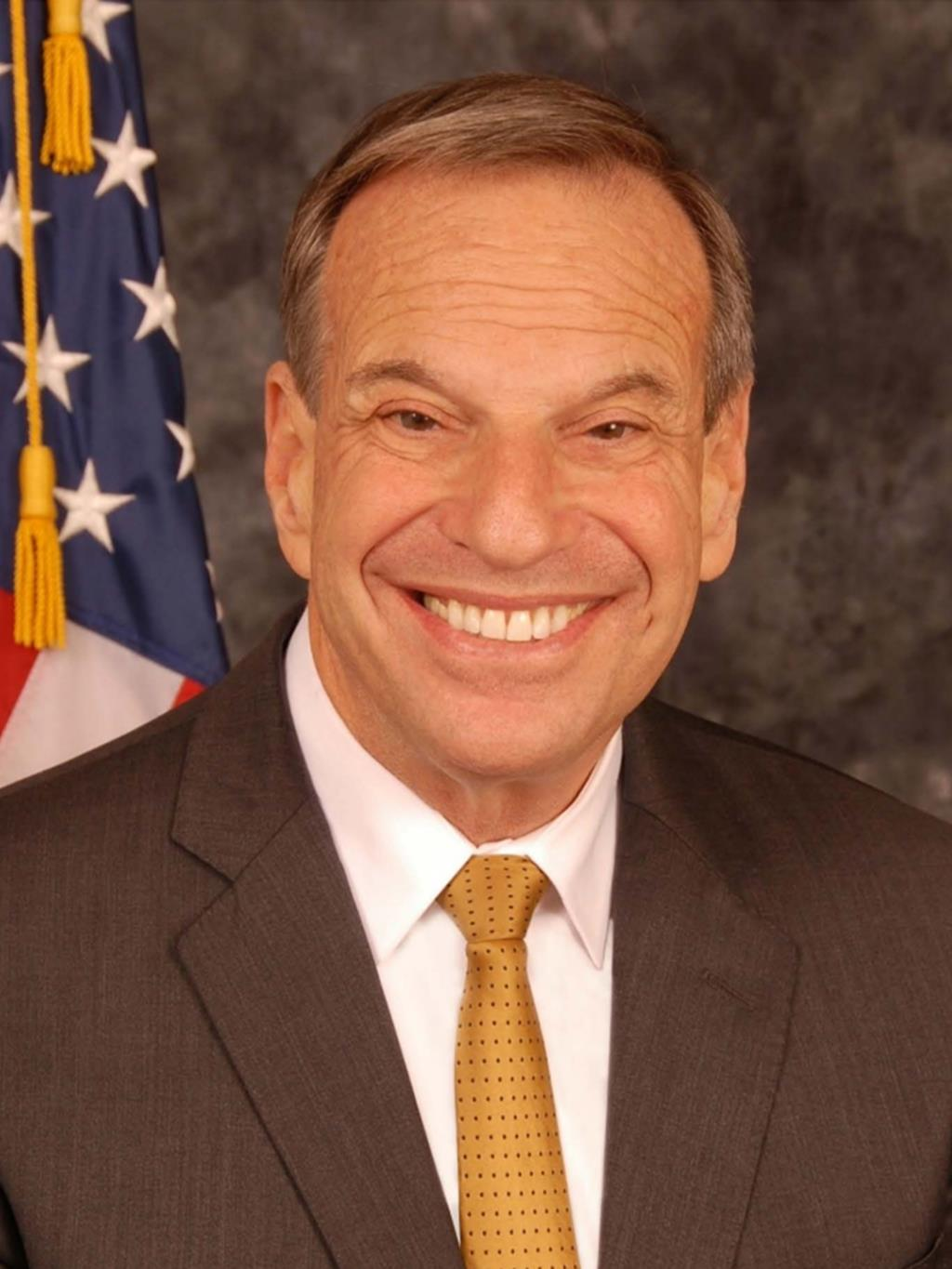

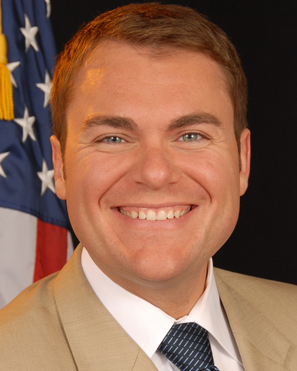
Nominee	Bob Filner	Carl DeMaio
Party	Democratic	Republican
Popular vote	245,092	221,870
Percentage	52.5%	47.5%
- Results by city council district Filner: 60–70% DeMaio: 50–60% 60–70%
Mayor before election
Jerry Sanders
Republican
Elected Mayor
Bob Filner
Democratic

The 2012 San Diego mayoral election was held on Tuesday, November 6, 2012, to elect the mayor of San Diego. Incumbent mayor Jerry Sanders was term-limited and ineligible to run for re-election.

Municipal elections in California are officially non-partisan, though some candidates do receive funding and support from various political parties. The non-partisan primary was held Tuesday, June 5, 2012. As no candidate received a majority of primary votes to be declared elected outright, the top two finishers, San Diego City Councilman Carl DeMaio and Congressman Bob Filner, advanced to the November general election. Filner was elected mayor with a majority of the votes in the November election.

The top two candidates received official support from their respective parties in the primaries and the general election; DeMaio was endorsed by the California Republican Party and Filner was endorsed by the California Democratic Party.

== Candidates ==
=== Declared ===
- Carl DeMaio, member of the San Diego City Council (Voter registration: Republican)
- Bonnie Dumanis, District Attorney of San Diego County (Voter registration: Republican)
- Bob Filner, U. S. Representative (Voter registration: Democratic)
- Nathan Fletcher, state Assemblyman (Voter registration: Republican (until March 2012), Independent (after March 2012))
- Tobiah Pettus, businessman (Voter registration: Republican)

=== Declined ===
- Kevin Faulconer, member of the San Diego City Council (Voter registration: Republican)
- Steve Francis, businessman and mayoral candidate in 2005 and 2008 (Voter registration: Republican)
- Christine Kehoe, state Senator (Voter registration: Democratic)

== Campaign ==
The mayoral race received national attention in March 2012 when The New York Times columnist David Brooks penned a column praising the moderate Nathan Fletcher and decrying the San Diego GOP's decision to back "orthodox conservative" Carl DeMaio over Fletcher for the post. Brooks was criticized by Reason's Matt Welch, who pointed out that DeMaio is openly gay and described him as having libertarian leanings. A few weeks after the local Republican party endorsed DeMaio, Fletcher announced he was leaving the Republican party and becoming an independent.

In the primary election held June 5, DeMaio placed first with 31.4 percent of the vote, followed by Filner with 30.5 percent. Trailing were Fletcher with 24.1 percent and Dumanis with 13.3 percent. As the top two vote-getters, DeMaio and Filner advanced to the November ballot. Filner was then elected mayor with 52.5 percent of the votes in the November election.

== Primary election ==
=== Polling ===
Poll source	Date(s) administered	Sample size	Margin of error	Carl DeMaio	Bonnie Dumanis	Bob Filner	Nathan Fletcher	Other	Undecided
SurveyUSA/KGTV	May 28–30, 2012	542	± 4.3%	31%	11%	28%	23%	3%	4%
SurveyUSA/KGTV	May 11–13, 2012	525	± 4.4%	31%	13%	21%	21%	6%	8%
SurveyUSA/KGTV	April 9–12, 2012	532	± 4.3%	28%	13%	20%	26%	4%	10%
SurveyUSA/KGTV	January 30–February 3, 2012	511	± 4.4%	25%	14%	24%	13%	11%	13%
SurveyUSA/KGTV	September 23–27, 2011	588	± 4.1%	25%	16%	25%	10%	9%	16%

=== Results ===
San Diego Mayoral Primary election, 2012
Party	Candidate	Votes	%
Republican	Carl DeMaio	73,508	31.4
Democratic	Bob Filner	73,216	30.5
Independent	Nathan Fletcher	57,939	24.1
Republican	Bonnie Dumanis	31,926	13.3
Nonpartisan	Tobiah Pettus	1,709	0.7
Write-in		752	0.3
Total votes		241,050	100

== General election ==
=== Polling ===
Poll source	Date(s) administered	Sample size	Margin of error	Carl DeMaio	Bob Filner	Undecided
Pharos Research	October 19–21, 2012	708	± 3.7%	38.3%	46.8%	15.1%
SurveyUSA/KGTV	October 12–14, 2012	601	n/a	40%	47%	13%
SurveyUSA/KGTV	September 21–24, 2012	581	± 4.1%	38%	50%	12%
SurveyUSA/KGTV	August 20–23, 2012	553	± 4.3%	41%	47%	12%
SurveyUSA/KGTV	June 6–11, 2012	537	± 4.3%	43%	46%	11%

=== Results ===
San Diego Mayoral General election, 2012
Party	Candidate	Votes	%
Democratic	Bob Filner	245,092	52.5
Republican	Carl DeMaio	221,870	47.5
Total votes		466,962	100
