= 2000 Puerto Rico Democratic presidential caucuses =

- April 2, 2000

58 delegates to the Democratic National Convention

Candidate	Al Gore	Uncommitted (voting option)
Home state	Tennessee	n/a
Delegate count	51	7
Percentage	100.0%

The 2000 Puerto Rico Democratic presidential caucuses were held on April 2, 2000, as part of the Democratic Party primaries for the 2000 presidential election. 58 delegates to the Democratic National Convention were allocated to presidential candidates.

Although Puerto Rico would not participate in the 2000 presidential general election because it is a U.S. territory and not a state, it equally participated in the U.S. presidential caucuses and primaries.

== Candidates ==
The following candidates achieved on the ballot:

- Al Gore
- Uncommitted (voting option)
- Bill Bradley

== Results ==
Puerto Rico Democratic caucus, April 2, 2000
Candidate	Votes	Percentage	Actual delegate count		
Candidate	Votes	Percentage	Bound	Unbound	Total
AI Gore			51		51
Uncommitted (voting option)			7		7
Bill Bradley					
Total:			58		58

== See also ==
- 2000 Republican Party presidential primaries
- 2000 United States presidential election
- 2000 United States elections
- 2000 Democratic Party presidential primaries
- 2000 Puerto Rico Republican presidential primary
- 2000 Puerto Rico presidential nominating contests
