= 2004 United States elections =

- ← 2002 2003 2004 2005 2006 → Presidential election year
- Election day: November 2
- Incumbent president: ▌George W. Bush (R)
- Next Congress: 109th

Presidential election
- Partisan control: Republican hold
- Popular vote margin: Republican +2.4%
- Electoral vote
- George W. Bush (R): 286
- John Kerry (D): 251
- 2004 presidential election results map. Red denotes states/districts won by Republican George W. Bush, and Blue denotes those won by Democrat John Kerry. Numbers indicate electoral votes allotted to the winner of each state.

Senate elections
- Overall control: Republican hold
- Seats contested: 34 of 100 seats
- Net seat change: Republican +4
- 2004 Senate election results map

House elections
- Overall control: Republican hold
- Popular vote margin: Republican +2.6%
- Net seat change: Republican +3
- 2004 House election results map

Gubernatorial elections
- Seats contested: 13 (11 states, 2 territories)
- Net seat change: 0
- 2004 gubernatorial election results map

Legend
- Democratic gain Republican gain Democratic hold Republican hold Popular Democratic hold Nonpartisan

Elections were held in the United States on November 2, 2004, during the early years of the war on terror and after the 2003 invasion of Iraq. Republican President George W. Bush won re-election and Republicans retained control of Congress.

Democratic Senator John Kerry of Massachusetts won his party's nomination after defeating Senator John Edwards and several other candidates in the 2004 Democratic presidential primaries. In the general election, Bush won 286 of the 538 electoral votes and 50.7 percent of the popular vote. Foreign policy was the dominant theme throughout the election campaign, particularly Bush's conduct of the war on terrorism and the 2003 invasion of Iraq.

Riding Bush's coattails, the Republicans picked up net gains of four Senate seats and three House seats. In the gubernatorial elections, neither party won a net gain of seats. Bush became the first president since Ronald Reagan in 1980 to see his party gain seats in both Houses of Congress during a presidential election year. Republicans would not win another trifecta until 2016.

Future President Barack Obama was elected to the United States Senate in Illinois, and he was elected president in the next presidential election.

As of 2024, this is the last time the incumbent party retained control over both the presidency and Congress after a single term. Democrats would maintain control of the presidency in 2012, but control of Congress remained split.

== Federal elections ==
=== President ===
Republican incumbent President George W. Bush was re-elected, defeating Democratic Senator John Kerry from Massachusetts.

=== United States Senate ===
The 34 seats in the United States Senate Class 3 were up for election. Republicans had a net gain of 4 seats. Summary of the 2004 United States Senate elections results

Parties							Total
Parties		Democratic	Republican	Independent	Libertarian	Others	Total
Before these elections		48	51	1	—	—	100
End of this Congress (two months later)		48	51	1	—	—	100
Not Up		29	36	1	—	—	66
Up		19	15	—	—	—	34
Incumbent retired	Total before	5	3	—	—	—	8
Incumbent retired	Held by same party	—	1	—	—	—	1
Incumbent retired	Replaced by other party	▼2 Republicans replaced by ▲2 Democrats ▼5 Democrats replaced by ▲5 Republicans		—	—	—	7
Incumbent retired	Result after	2	6	—	—	—	8
Incumbent ran	Total before	14	12 (Note: Includes the interim appointee ran for election.)	—	—	—	26
Incumbent ran	Won re-election	13	12	—	—	—	25
Incumbent ran	Lost re-election	▼1 Democrat replaced by ▲1 Republican		—	—	—	1
Incumbent ran	Lost renomination, held by same party	—	—	—	—	—	0
Incumbent ran	Lost renomination, and party lost	—	—	—	—	—	0
Incumbent ran	Result after	13	13	—	—	—	26
Net gain/loss		▼4	▲4	—	—	—	4
Total elected		15	19	—	—	—	34
Result		44	55	1	—	—	100
Popular vote	Votes	44,754,618	39,920,562	186,231	754,861	2,481,075	88,097,347
Popular vote	Share	50.80%	45.31%	0.21%	0.86%	2.82%	100%

Sources:

- Dave Leip's Atlas of U.S. Elections
- United States Elections Project at George Mason University Archived 2013-07-09 at the Wayback Machine

=== United States House of Representatives ===
Republicans gained a couple of seats in the House, mainly due to the 2003 Texas redistricting. Republicans won the national popular vote for the House of Representatives by a margin of 2.6 percentage points.

Summary of the 2004 United States House of Representatives elections results
Parties	Seats				Popular vote		
Parties	2002	2004	Net change	Strength	Vote	%	Change
Republican Party	229	232	▲3	53.3%	55,958,144	49.4%	-0.6%
Democratic Party	205	202	▼3	46.4%	52,969,786	46.8%	+1.6%
Libertarian Party	—	—	—	—	1,056,844	0.9%	-0.5%
Independent	1	1	0	0.2%	674,202	0.6%	+0.1%
Green Party	—	—	—	—	344,549	0.3%	-0.1%
Constitution Party	—	—	—	—	187,006	0.2%	-
Reform Party	—	—	—	—	85,539	0.1%	+0.1%
Independence Party	—	—	—	—	76,053	0.1%	+0.1%
Others	—	—	—	—	1,840,163	1.6%	-0.6%
Total	434	435	0	100.0%	113,192,286	100.0%	–
Source: Election Statistics - Office of the Clerk

== State elections ==
=== Governors ===
Eleven of the fifty United States governors were up for re-election, as were the governorships of two U.S. territories. The final results were a net change of zero between the political parties. The Democrats picked up the governorships in Montana and New Hampshire, but the Republicans picked up the ones in Indiana and Missouri.

=== Other statewide elections ===
In many states where if the following positions were elective offices, voters cast votes for candidates for state executive branch offices of Lieutenant Governor (though some were voted for on the same ticket as the gubernatorial nominee), Secretary of state, state Treasurer, state Auditor, state Attorney General, state Superintendent of Education, Commissioners of Insurance, Agriculture or, Labor, etc.) and state judicial branch offices (seats on state Supreme Courts and, in some states, state appellate courts).

=== State legislative elections ===
Elections to state legislatures were held on November 2, 2004, alongside other elections. Elections were held for 85 legislative chambers, with all states but Louisiana, Mississippi, New Jersey, Alabama, Maryland, and Virginia holding elections in at least one house. Michigan and Minnesota held elections for their lower, but not upper houses. Six chambers in three territories and the District of Columbia were up as well.

The 2004 elections created narrow legislative divisions across the country. Both parties flipped seats and chambers across the country, with most Democratic gains coming from the Northeast and West and most Republican gains coming from the South. Over 20 states featured statehouses controlled by fewer than four seats, and nearly 30 states featured divided governments. Both parties took advantage of heavy spending from 527 organizations.

Republicans won control of four chambers from the Democrats. The institution of term limits contributed to the Republican takeover of the Oklahoma House of Representatives for the first time since 1923, and favorable redistricting aided Republicans in winning the Georgia House of Representatives (and a trifecta) for the first time ever. Republicans additionally won the Tennessee Senate, for the time since 1870, and the Indiana House of Representatives.

Democrats performed better than Republicans overall at the state-legislative level, despite their defeat in the concurrent presidential election, winning control of eight additional chambers. Favorable redistricting enabled the Democratic takeover of the Montana Legislature and their retaking of control of the North Carolina House of Representatives, which was previously tied. Additionally, they took control of the Washington Senate; the Oregon Senate, which was previously tied; both houses of the Colorado General Assembly for the first time since 1963, and the Vermont House of Representatives. The Iowa Senate became tied after previously being controlled by the Republicans prior to the election. Democrats' takeover of the Montana House only came after the Montana Supreme Court declared a Democrat a victor in a contested election that evenly split the chamber. This gave Democrats control of the chamber with the help of incoming governor Brian Schweitzer.

The Democrats also regained the title of holding the most legislative seats across the country, winning one more seat than the Republicans.

=== Initiatives and referendums ===
Vote for same-sex marriage ban by counties: 90% – 100% 80% – 90% 70% – 80% 60% – 70% 50% – 60% Vote against same-sex marriage ban by counties: 60% – 70% 50% – 60%

- State constitutional amendments prohibiting same-sex marriage are passed in eleven states: Arkansas, Georgia, Kentucky, Michigan, Mississippi, Montana, North Dakota, Ohio, Oklahoma, Oregon, and Utah. The measures in Oregon, Mississippi, and Montana bans same-sex marriage only, while Arkansas, Georgia, Kentucky, North Dakota, Oklahoma, Ohio, and Utah bans both same-sex marriage and civil unions and Michigan bans granting any benefits whatsoever to same-sex couples.

== Local elections ==
=== Mayoral elections ===
Some of the major American cities that held their mayoral elections in 2004 included:

- Chesapeake – Dalton S. Edge won an open seat race to succeed outgoing Mayor William E. Ward.
- Jersey City- In a special election triggered due to the passing of Glenn Cunningham (D), attorney Jerramiah Healy (D) defeated General Assemblyman Louis Manzo (D) and Acting Mayor L. Harvey Smith (D) to serve the rest of the unexpired term.
- San Diego – Incumbent Mayor Dick Murphy (R) was re-elected, but resigned five months later.
