= 2000 Puerto Rico Republican presidential primary =

- February 27, 2000

14 delegates to the Republican National Convention
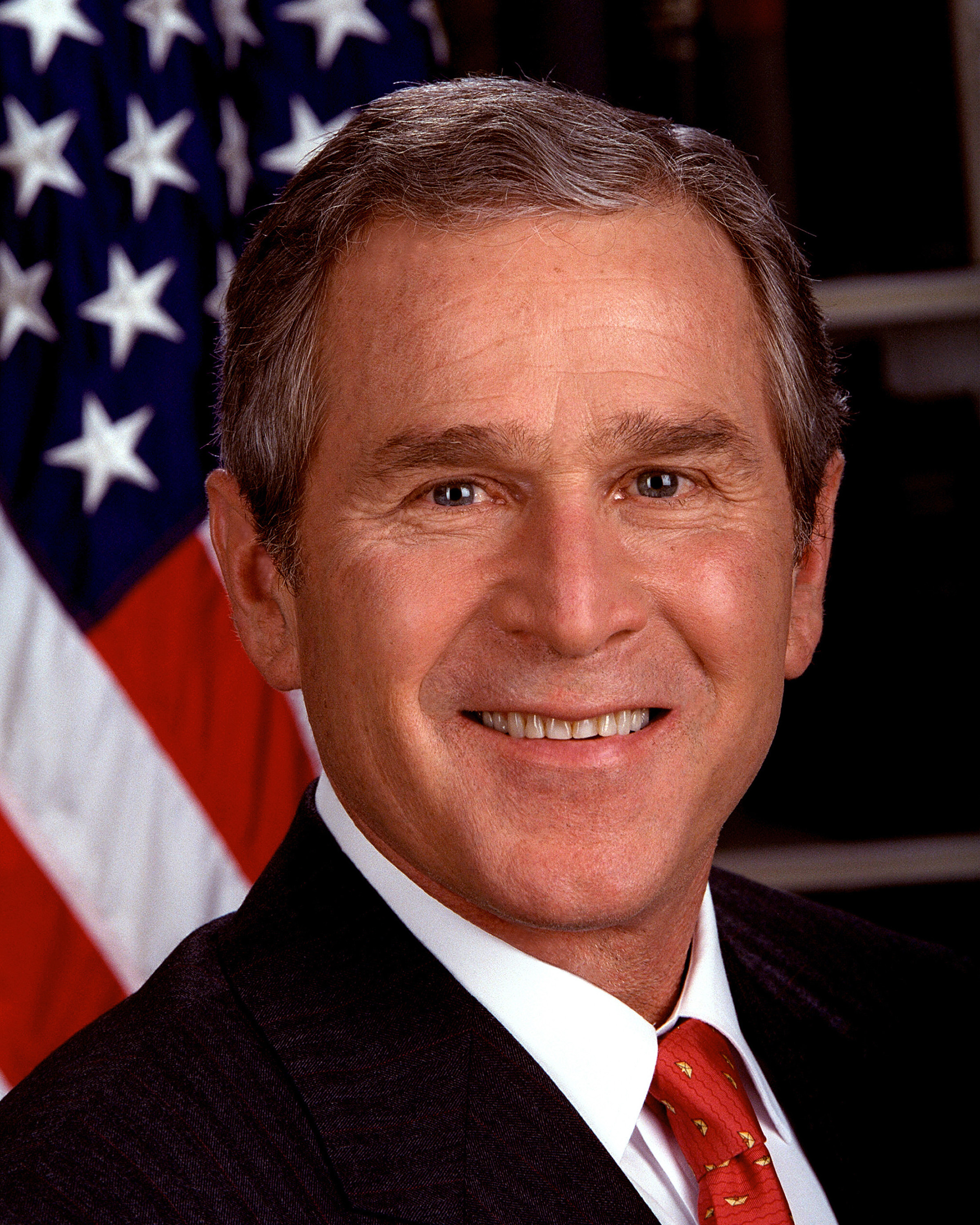

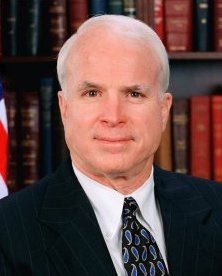
Candidate	George W. Bush	John McCain
Home state	Texas	Arizona
Delegate count	14
Popular vote	87,375	4,903
Percentage	92.6%	5.9%

The 2000 Puerto Rico Republican presidential primary was held on February 27, 2000, as part of the Republican Party primaries for the 2000 presidential election. 14 delegates to the Republican National Convention were allocated to presidential candidates.

Although Puerto Rico would not participate in the 2000 presidential general election because it is a U.S. territory and not a state, it equally participated in the U.S. presidential caucuses and primaries.

== Candidates ==
The following candidates achieved on the ballot:

- George W. Bush
- John McCain
- Steve Forbes
- Write-in candidate
- Alan Keyes
- Gary Bauer

== Results ==
Puerto Rico Republican primary, February 27, 2000
Candidate	Votes	Percentage	Actual delegate count		
Candidate	Votes	Percentage	Bound	Unbound	Total
George W. Bush	87,375	92.6%	14		14
John McCain	4,903	5.9%			
Steve Forbes	210	<1%			
Write-in candidate	178	<1%			
Alan Keyes	49	<1%			
Gary Bauer	34	<1%			
Total:	92,749	100%	14		14

== See also ==
- 2000 Republican Party presidential primaries
- 2000 United States presidential election
- 2000 United States elections
- 2000 Puerto Rico Democratic presidential caucuses
- 2000 Puerto Rico presidential nominating contests
