= Institute for Policy Research =

Institute for Policy Research may refer to:

- Institute for Policy Research and Catholic Studies at The Catholic University of America
- Institute for Jewish Policy Research
- Institute for Public Policy Research
- Institute for Women's Policy Research
- Calvert Institute for Policy Research
- Kenya Institute for Public Policy Research and Analysis
- Manhattan Institute for Policy Research
- Northwestern University Institute for Policy Research
- San Diego Institute for Policy Research

== See also ==
- International Food Policy Research Institute
- Stanford Institute for Economic Policy Research
