= Diann Shipione =

American businesswoman

Diann Shipione is a former trustee of the San Diego City Employees' Retirement System pension board, credited with exposing unlawful underfunding of the pension fund and omissions in municipal bond sales documents. She was formerly a vice president at UBS financial services and is the wife of businessman Patrick C. Shea.

== Situation background ==
The San Diego City Employees' Retirement System had been underfunded in some form for more than a decade. In 2001, as a result of years of sharp increases in pension benefits combined with decreases in pension funding and a decrease in the value of investments, the fund fell below certain funding targets.

== Revelation of the problem ==
In 2002 Shipione, as a pension board trustee, raised concerns to the San Diego mayor and City Council about a proposal that would essentially reduce money going into the retirement fund and increase money going out of it. In 2003 she raised additional concerns that an announced $500 million City of San Diego municipal bond sale prospectus had material omissions about the pension fund.

City officials and other pension board members made efforts to discredit and sideline her. At one point they bought an ad in the San Diego Union-Tribune that scoffed, "Chicken Little Would Be Proud." In a continued effort to remove her from the retirement board, the mayor and a City Council majority voted to ban investment advisers from the board; Shipione was the only investment adviser on the retirement board. Eventually the City Council rescinded its vote to ban investment advisors after the national press picked up coverage on the matter. Later, the City Council decided to terminate the remaining terms of all members of the board and have the entire board replaced. Despite calls for Shipione to be appointed to the new board, she was not.

Conflict came to a peak on November 19, 2004 when she was ordered to leave a closed session of the trustees. A plan to place her under citizen's arrest and have police remove her was almost implemented, but she left as ordered. The other board members voted to file ethics charges against her, ask for her removal as a board member, and ban her from meetings. The San Diego Ethics Commission later dismissed the complaints levied against her by the pension board.

The United States Securities and Exchange Commission began investigations into the city's municipal bond disclosures regarding its pension and retiree health care obligations. By 2005, several city officials had resigned, including the City Auditor, City Manager, City Treasurer, and newly reelected Mayor Dick Murphy.

== Aftermath ==
The City of San Diego was the target of two federal investigations following revelations in January 2004 that financial documents used to secure bonds had been filled with errors and omissions.

In November 2006, the SEC entered an order sanctioning the City of San Diego for committing securities fraud by failing to disclose to the investing public important information about its pension and retiree health care obligations in the sale of its municipal bonds in 2002 and 2003. To settle that action, the City agreed to cease and desist from future securities fraud violations and to retain an independent consultant for three years to foster compliance with its disclosure obligations under the federal securities laws.

In 2007 the SEC filed a civil injunctive action for fraud against outside auditors for the city and its pension system. The auditors consented to the entry of a final judgment permanently enjoining them from violating the antifraud provisions of federal securities laws and paid a civil penalty.

Shipione's work is regularly cited in the area of City financial irregularities that go unattended.

Notwithstanding the multi-year smear campaign and plan to arrest her concocted by city officials and pension board trustees, Diann Shipione was eventually proven right.

In 2009 Shipione was admitted to the Harvard Kennedy School of Government Master's program in Public Administration. While at Harvard she remained active in the national public pension debate and participated in three separate Governmental Accounting Standards Board official Invitations to Comment regarding potential changes to pension accounting and financial reporting standards.

== Recognition ==
Shipione received the following public recognitions for her pension system related services:

- 12/11/2003 San Diego Retired City Employees' Association Annual Outstanding Contribution Award for "distinguished pro-bono services to the City Employees' Retirement System Board of Administration."
- 1/8/2005 Californians Aware NOVA Award for a "high standard of integrity, diligence and courage."
- 2/8/2005 County of San Diego California Board of Supervisors' Proclamation for "outstanding service, leadership, and commitment to area residents."
- 3/2005 City of San Diego Mayoral Service Award for "outstanding service and continuous dedication."
- 3/18/2005 San Diego City Council Member Donna Frye Special Commendation Award for earning "the respect and trust of the public."
- 2005 San Diego Regional Chamber of Commerce Catalyst for Change Award "for valor and dedication in calling for reform of the City of San Diego Pension System."
- 2005 Public Relations Society of America, San Diego Chapter Diogenes Award for "remarkable and commendable understanding of the need for candor when dealing with the public and the news media, regardless of any potential negative outcome from the resulting publicity."
- 4/19/2006 League of Women Voters Civic Service Award
- 4/16/2006 California State Assembly Certificate of Appreciation Award for "encouraging the informed and active participation of citizens in public affairs."
- 4/19/2006 San Diego City Council Civic Service Award for "dedication and valuable contributions to the citizens of San Diego."
- 12/11/2006 San Diego City Attorney Outstanding Citizen Award.
- 3/25/2015 San Diego County Commission on the Status of Women - Women's Herstory Month Notable "for bringing attention to the underfunded pension system and challenging fraud on behalf of the public."

== Education ==
Shipione received a B.A. from the University of Arizona and a M.P.A. from Harvard University.

== Personal Background ==
Raised in Boston MA, Athens Greece, Salt Lake City Utah, and Tucson Arizona, Shipione was the first AFS Intercultural Programs exchange student from the United States to Sri Lanka, then known as Ceylon. She graduated from the University of Arizona and Harvard. Shipione worked in the technology field, first for Metamorphic Systems in the “Utility Muffin Research Kitchen” with Phil Zimmermann, legendary encryption engineer and creator of Pretty Good Privacy (PGP), hardware wizard Steve Welch, and futurist Tom Meyer. She later worked with early "Case for Mars" conference organizers, including NASA planetary scientist Dr. Christopher P. McKay.

In 1986, she began a 20-year career in the financial services industry that included Morgan Stanley, Merrill Lynch and U.B.S.

In 1995, she was appointed to the San Diego Funds Commission that invested and oversaw a ~$36 million civic trust. She was later appointed one of four public representative Trustees on the thirteen member San Diego City Employees' Retirement System Board ($5 bl.). She remained a Trustee until 2005 when the board was completely stood down and replaced during the San Diego pension scandal brought to light by Shipione.
