= 2004 San Diego City Attorney election =

- November 4, 2004
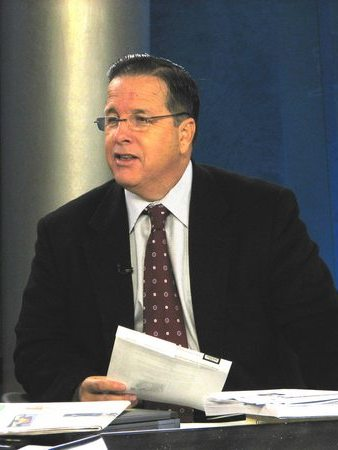
Nominee	Mike Aguirre	Leslie Devaney
Party	Democratic	Republican
Popular vote	206,594	203,301
Percentage	50.4%	49.6%
City Attorney before election
Casey Gwinn
Republican
Elected City Attorney
Mike Aguirre
Democratic

The 2004 San Diego City Attorney election occurred on Tuesday, November 2, 2004. The primary election was held on Tuesday, June 2, 2004.

Municipal elections in California are officially non-partisan, although most members do identify a party preference. A two-round system was used for the election, starting with a primary in June followed by a runoff in November between the top-two candidates.

== Results ==
San Diego City Attorney primary election, 2004
Party	Candidate	Votes	%
Democratic	Michael J. Aguirre	104,610	45.93%
Republican	Leslie Devaney	63,664	27.95%
Democratic	Deborah L. Berger	59,335	26.05%
Total votes		227,782	100%

San Diego City Attorney general election, 2004
Party	Candidate	Votes	%
Democratic	Michael J. Aguirre	206,594	50.40%
Republican	Leslie Devaney	203,301	49.60%
Total votes		409,895	100%
