= 2004 San Diego mayoral election =

- November 2, 2004
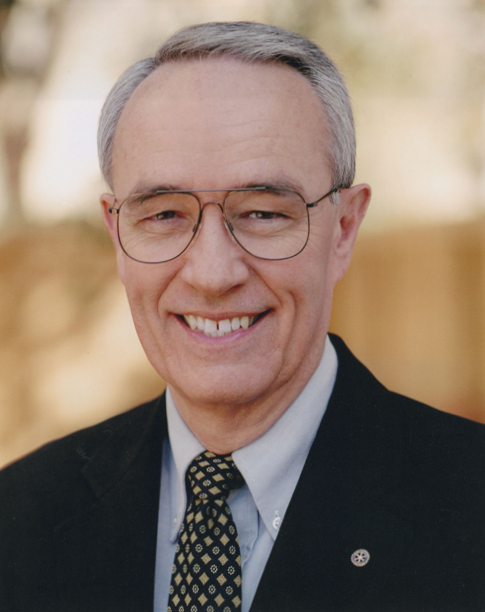

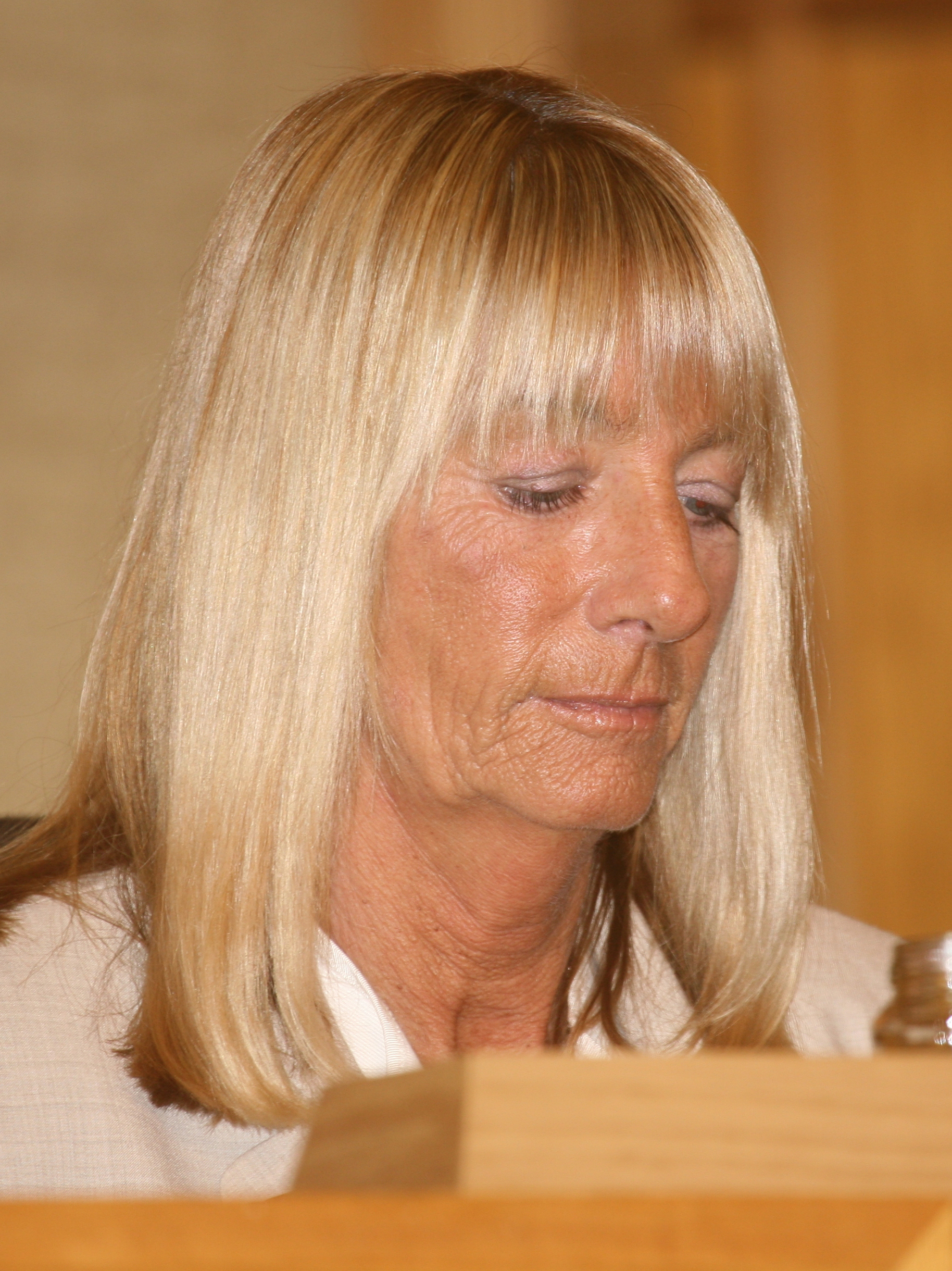

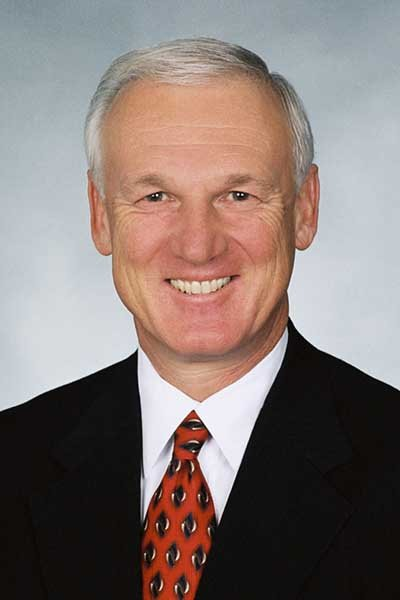
Nominee	Dick Murphy	Donna Frye (write-in)	Ron Roberts
Party	Republican	Democratic	Republican
Popular vote	157,929	155,851	141,884
Percentage	34.7%	34.2%	31.1%
Mayor before election
Dick Murphy
Republican
Elected Mayor
Dick Murphy
Republican

The 2004 San Diego mayoral election was held on Tuesday, November 2, 2004 to elect the mayor of San Diego. Incumbent mayor Dick Murphy stood for reelection for a second term.

Municipal elections in California are officially non-partisan, though some candidates do receive funding and support from various political parties. The non-partisan primary was held Tuesday, June 3, 2004. Murphy and county supervisor Ron Roberts received the most votes and advanced to the November general election.

After the primary San Diego City Council member Donna Frye entered the race as a write-in candidate for the November general election. Murphy was certified as winner with a narrow plurality of the votes in the general election over runner-up Frye. This result was subject to a recount and litigation before ultimately being upheld by the courts in February 2005.

== Candidates ==
=== Declared ===
- Dick Murphy, incumbent mayor of San Diego (Voter registration: Republican)
- Ron Roberts, San Diego County supervisor and mayoral candidate in 1992 and 2000 (Voter registration: Republican)
- Peter Q. Davis, banker (Voter registration: Republican)
- Jim Bell, environmental designer (Party preference: Democratic)

=== Write-in ===
- Donna Frye, city council member (Voter registration: Democratic)

== Campaign ==
In the March primary Dick Murphy received the most votes but not a majority, denying him the outright majority needed for an outright victory. This was the first time in twenty years that an incumbent mayor was forced to face a runoff election. San Diego County Supervisor Ron Roberts received the second most votes and advanced to the general election alongside Murphy. Roberts had also been the runner-up in the 2000 mayoral election against Murphy.

After the primary elections, San Diego City Council member Donna Frye announced that she would run as a write-in candidate. Frye ran a maverick campaign against Murphy and Roberts, who were both considered establishment candidates by the media. Frye was the only member of the city council to vote against the underfunding of San Diego's pension liabilities that led to the San Diego pension scandal. As mayor, Murphy had voted in favor of the underfunding.

== Recount and litigation ==
In the general election, Dick Murphy was certified as winner of a plurality of votes by a margin of 2,108 votes over runner-up Frye. However, news outlets uncovered 5,547 ballots that were not counted on which voters had written in Frye's name but not filled in the adjacent oval. If these votes had been counted, Frye would have been elected mayor instead of Murphy. Members of the media requested a recount indirectly on Frye's behalf, leading to allegations of bias from Murphy's lawyers.

Attorney Fred Woocher filed a lawsuit on behalf of three voters contesting Murphy's victory due to the 5,000 uncounted ballots. On February 2, 2005, Judge Michael Brenner ruled that the unfilled ovals did not count as votes under California state law, ending the post-election litigation battle.

== Aftermath ==
In April 2005, only two months after the results of the election were officially upheld by the courts, Murphy announced that he would be resigning as mayor. In the face of a deepening pension scandal that he was personally involved in, Murphy stated that San Diego needed a mayor with the support of the majority of residents and a clear mandate to lead the city out of its crisis. The city held a special election to fill the vacancy at mayor.

In response to Donna Frye's nearly successful write-in candidacy, the San Diego City Council amended the municipal code so that write-in candidates could not run in general elections or run-off elections. Write-ins are still permitted in primary elections and recall elections.

== Primary election results ==
San Diego mayoral primary election, 2004
Party	Candidate	Votes	%
Republican	Dick Murphy (incumbent)	100,086	40.3
Republican	Ron Roberts	73,223	29.4
Republican	Peter Q. Davis	56,037	22.5
Democratic	Jim Bell	18,933	7.6
Total votes		248,868	100.0

== General election results ==
San Diego mayoral general election, 2004
Party	Candidate	Votes	%
Republican	Dick Murphy (incumbent)	157,929	34.7
Democratic	Donna Frye (write-in)	155,851	34.2
Republican	Ron Roberts	141,884	31.1
Total votes		455,694	100.0
