= Paul Erdman =

American economist and banker

- Born: Paul Emil Erdman; May 19, 1932; Stratford, Ontario, Canada
- Died: April 23, 2007 (aged 74); Healdsburg, California, U.S.
- Education: Georgetown University; University of Basel (Ph.D.)

Paul Emil Erdman was a Canadian-born American economist and banker who became known for writing novels based on monetary trends and international finance.

== Early life ==
Erdman was born in Stratford, Ontario, Canada, on 19 May 1932 to an American Lutheran minister and his wife. He graduated from Concordia Seminary in 1954 receiving a bachelor of divinity degree, and from Georgetown University's School of Foreign Service. He was an assistant editor of the editorial page at the Washington Post and worked in a brokerage house in Washington. He received his PhD in economics, European history and theology from the University of Basel in Switzerland in 1958. In 1958 he worked as a financial analyst for the European Coal and Steel Community. Between 1959 and 1961, he worked as an economist at the SRI International in Menlo Park, California.

== Banking career ==
"the Swiss, who tried to block publication of his 1959 doctoral thesis at the University of Basel because it uncovered part of the story of Swiss banks and their Nazi clients."

Charles E. Salik hired Erdman to help his tax-protected, Bermuda-based Electronics International Capital (EIC). Salik and Richard Silberman were ousted from EIC by Jerome Kohlberg. Salik then launched Salik Bank, a Swiss bank, and hired Erdman as president, in 1965. In 1969, First Interstate Bancorp bought a majority stake and renamed it the United California Bank in Basel. The bank collapsed after taking large losses speculating in the cocoa market. Erdman and other board members were accused of fraud and mismanagement. Erdman spent 10 months in solitary confinement without being charged before being released on a $133,000 bail bond in 1971. Erdman skipped out on the bail and flew to England, later returning to the United States. Several officers of the bank were convicted and served prison terms. Erdman was convicted and given a sentence of nine years in absentia.

== Writing career ==
During his time in prison, Erdman occupied his time by writing, on an Olivetti typewriter, fiction, because he lacked research resources, including the first 60 pages of his novel, The Billion Dollar Sure Thing. It received a 1974 Edgar Award from the Mystery Writers of America for Best First Novel and was published in the UK as The Billion Dollar Killing. His second novel, The Silver Bears (1974) was turned into a 1978 movie of nearly the same name, starring Michael Caine. His best-selling novels are credited with the invention of the "financial thriller" genre. Additionally, the information in The Swiss Account is credited with providing a basis for helping track down the assets of Jewish victims of the Holocaust.

Erdman became a founding financial columnist for MarketWatch and regularly wrote financial columns.

Erdman also wrote The New York Times book reviews.

Erdman also wrote newspaper articles on professional football.

Erdman was a leading expert in the international economics field and published non-fictional works, such as Tug of War, which set out his views on exchange rates and the international financial system.

== Personal life ==
Erdman was married to Helly Boeglin and they had two daughters. After the collapse of the Swiss bank, they moved to England and later Northern California. Erdman died from cancer at his ranch in Healdsburg, California on April 23, 2007.

== Selected fictional works ==
- The Billion Dollar Sure Thing (1973)
- The Silver Bears (1974)
- The Crash Of '79 (1976)
- The Last Days Of America (1981)
- The Panic Of '89 (1986)
- The Palace (1987)
- What's Next? (1988)
- The Swiss Account (1992)
- Zero Coupon (1993)
- The Set-up (1997)
- The Great Game (2007)

== Selected non-fictional works ==
- Erdman, Paul (1984). Paul Erdman's Money Book: An Investor's Guide to Economics and Finance. Random House. ISBN 978-0-394-52482-5.
- Erdman, Paul (1988). What's Next?: How to Prepare Yourself for the Crash of '89 and Profit in the 1990's. Doubleday. ISBN 978-0-385-24698-9.
- Erdman, Paul (1996). Tug of War: Today's Global Currency Crisis. St. Martin's Press. ISBN 978-0-312-15899-6.
