= 2008 San Diego mayoral election =

- June 3, 2008
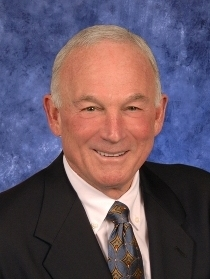

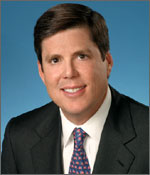
Nominee	Jerry Sanders	Steve Francis
Party	Republican	Republican
Popular vote	116,527	73,665
Percentage	54.3%	34.3%
Mayor before election
Jerry Sanders
Republican
Elected Mayor
Jerry Sanders
Republican

The 2008 San Diego mayoral election was held on Tuesday, June 3, 2008, to elect the mayor of San Diego. Incumbent mayor Jerry Sanders ran for a second term as mayor against field of four other candidates.

Municipal elections in California are officially non-partisan, though some candidates do receive funding and support from various political parties. The non-partisan primary was held Tuesday, June 3, 2008. Since the incumbent Sanders received a majority of primary votes, he was elected outright with no need for a runoff in the November general election.

== Candidates ==
- Jerry Sanders, incumbent mayor of San Diego (Voter registration: Republican)
- Steve Francis, businessman and mayoral candidate in 2005 (Voter registration: Republican)
- Floyd L. Morrow, former member of the San Diego City Council and mayoral candidate in 1986 and 1988 (Voter registration: Democratic)
- Eric M. Bidwell, T-shirt designer (No political affiliation)
- James B. Hart, aircraft mechanic and perennial candidate (Voter registration: Republican)

== Campaign ==
Fellow republican Steve Francis was considered the main opponent to incumbent Jerry Sanders by local reporters. The race was notable for the open hostility between the two front-runners. Memorably, after an April debate in Balboa Park, instead of shaking Francis's hand, Sanders privately said "Fuck you, Steve" instead. Francis later reported the profanity to the local media. In response to questions about the incident, Sanders claimed that he was frustrated with Francis trying to "buy the office" with his personal fortune and conducting push polls impugning his record as mayor.

== Primary election results ==
San Diego Mayoral Primary election, 2008
Party	Candidate	Votes	%
Republican	Jerry Sanders (incumbent)	116,527	54.3
Republican	Steve Francis	73,665	34.3
Democratic	Floyd L. Morrow	13,620	6.4
Nonpartisan	Eric M. Bidwell	8,368	3.9
Republican	James B. Hart	2,392	0.7
Total votes		214,572	100

== General election ==
Because Sanders won a majority of the votes in the June primary, there was no need for a runoff in the November general election.
