= Patrick Shea (California lawyer) =

American lawyer

Patrick C. Shea is an attorney in California. He was the federal court-appointed attorney that represented 170-plus municipal entities with investments of over $5 billion in the Orange County, California, Chapter 9 bankruptcy. On December 6, 1994, the County of Orange declared Chapter 9 bankruptcy, from which it emerged in June 1995. The Orange County bankruptcy was the largest municipal bankruptcy in U.S. history. Following a tumultuous several year period of financial disclosures by the City of San Diego relating to its massively underfunded pension and retiree health care system, in 2005 Shea ran for mayor of San Diego on a platform of filing a Chapter 9 bankruptcy for the city in order to restructure its troubled financial condition.

== Career ==
Shea is a lawyer and businessman, as well as a strategic adviser in financial structures, capital structures, capital projects, and private/public sector He has represented or advised many of the nation's largest financial institutions, their boards of directors, individual officers and board members. He has been appointed to represent large classes of financial interests in difficult capital and finance-related restructures. He has managed large law firms and corporate entities and served as outside counsel to various trusts. He was president and chief executive officer of Brown Field Aviation Park LLC, a company formed to convert a little-used municipal airport (San Diego Brown Field Airport) into a regional airport cargo facility. The City of San Diego elected not to complete the cargo airport conversion. Before that, Shea served as Partner in the San Diego office of Pillsbury Winthrop LLP, where he specialized in commercial finance, litigation and financial reorganization.

In 2005, Shea ran unsuccessfully for mayor of San Diego, California, advocating that the city should file for Chapter 9 bankruptcy to address its financial problems.

He has served as chairman of the board of directors of the San Diego Convention Center Corporation and chairman of the San Diego Ballpark Task Force which led to the development and construction of the city's downtown professional baseball venue, Petco Park. He was general counsel and corporate secretary to the San Diego Host Committee for the 1996 Republican National Convention in San Diego. He is a cofounder and director of a regional bank with branches in California and Washington. He has authored and edited commercial, legal, and business publications. He is a national speaker on matters related to corporate and municipal debt, restructuring and reorganizations.

== Education ==
Shea received an undergraduate degree in philosophy from Stanford and holds both an MBA and Juris Doctor degree from Harvard University.

== Personal ==
He is married to financial advisor Diann Shipione, the former City of San Diego, California pension-board member, who in 2002 was the first to say San Diego's finances were vulnerable because the city was raising public employee retirement benefits without making the necessary pension fund contributions to pay for them.
