= Ronald W. Dworkin =

Anesthesiologist and author

- Born: Ronald William Dworkin
- Education: Johns Hopkins University (PhD); University of California, San Diego (MD)
- Occupations: Non-fiction writer, anesthesiologist
- Writing career
- Period: 1996–present
- Notable works: Artificial Happiness (2006); The Rise of the Imperial Self (1996)

Ronald William Dworkin (/ˈdwɔːrkɪn/) is an anesthesiologist and author who is a senior fellow at the Hudson Institute.

== Biography ==
Ronald W. Dworkin has practiced anesthesiology at the Greater Baltimore Medical Center since 1989. In 1995, Dworkin was awarded a Ph.D. in political philosophy from the Johns Hopkins University. He writes widely on topics where medical research intersects with political control, often focusing on what he sees as obsession with pushing happiness above all else. In other words, society likes to see unhappiness as a disease that must be stamped out with a mixture of drugs and denial. His book, Artificial Happiness published in 2006, lays out the dangers in the blind pursuit of happiness, arguing that it leads us to ignore or avoid some fundamental truths about life.

Richard John Neuhaus wrote of the book,

A particular strength of Artificial Happiness is its treatment of the doping of millions of children with Ritalin and other drugs. We are running the grave risk of depriving the next generation of experiences that are essential to growing up. Sadness, failure, disappointment, and other aspects of unhappiness are both inevitable and necessary in learning and achievement. What is often called attention deficit disorder (ADD) is in many cases the most natural of childhood conditions, notably among boys. Dworkin makes a convincing case that the life experience of young people is often being repressed and distorted for the convenience of teachers and parents.

In 1996, he co-founded the Calvert Institute for Policy Research. His recent focus has been on social alienation with an application of Marx's theory of alienation.

== Bibliography ==
Dworkin has published several books including:

- The Rise of the Imperial Self (1996)
- Artificial Happiness: The Dark Side of the New Happy Class (2006)
- How Karl Marx Can Save American Capitalism, Lexington Books, (2015) ISBN 978-1498509725
