= Richard Silberman =

American businessman and investor

Richard T. Silberman is an American businessman and political figure. He was a major investor in the Jack in the Box fast food chain and helped fund its expansion. He then served as an aide and campaign fundraiser for California governor Jerry Brown. In 1990 he pleaded guilty to conspiring to launder purported drug profits.

== Business ==
A native of San Diego, Silberman graduated from San Diego State College with a degree in physics. In 1946 he earned his master's degree from Ohio State University. He led Convair's electronic and computer guided missile program until 1952, when he was named president of Kay Lab. In 1960, Silberman and Charles E. Salik began selling stock in Electronics International Capital, a business based in the tax haven of Bermuda that was formed to invest in European electronics companies. After some poor investments, Silberman hired Paul Erdman to help turn things around. Silberman and Salik were eventually removed from the company in a coup orchestrated by Jerome Kohlberg Jr.

In 1965, Silberman became a general partner of Jack in the Box and helped finance the expansion of the fast food chain. In 1968 the company was sold to Ralston Purina for $58 million. Soon thereafter, Silberman and Jack in the Box founder Robert O. Peterson purchased First National Bank. In 1975 the bank was sold to The Bank of Tokyo, which renamed it again as Union Bank. After leaving the governor's office, Silberman became a chairman and chief executive officer of Yuba Natural Resources Inc..

== Politics ==
Silberman's political involvement began in 1963, when he was appointed to the San Diego Unified School District Board of Education. He later served as chairman of the San Diego Stadium Authority. In 1975, Silberman backed mayor Pete Wilson for reelection and Wilson appointed Silberman to chair the Centre City Development Corp. and the San Diego Transit Authority.

Silberman served as financial chairman for California Governor Jerry Brown's 1976 presidential campaign. The following year, Brown appointed Silberman to the position of state secretary of Business and Transportation. In 1978 he served as Brown's interim chief of staff while Gray Davis managed the Governor's reelection campaign. Later that year, Brown appointed Silberman to the position of state Director of Finance. He stepped down in August 1979 to serve as co-chair of Brown's 1980 presidential exploratory committee.

In 1984, Silberman married Republican politician Susan Golding. Silberman's marriage to Golding led to him and Robert O. Peterson severing ties, as one of Golding's political rivals was Peterson's wife Maureen O'Connor. Silberman and Golding divorced in 1991.

== Legal issues ==
In 1979, the Internal Revenue Service sought $278,982 in back taxes from Silberman and his ex-wife. The agency alleged that Silberman had over-valued 917 acres of land he and four associates had donated to a non-profit.

On April 7, 1989, Silberman was arrested on money laundering charges. According to the Federal Bureau of Investigation, Silberman had agreed to launder over $1 million he believed came from Colombian cocaine traffickers. On June 28, 1990, Silberman was found guilty on one count of violating currency reporting laws. However, the jury was unable to return a verdict on five other counts. That September he pleaded guilty to conspiracy to launder purported drug profits in exchange for the government dropping the other four charges. He was sentenced to 46 months in prison.
