= Brage Golding =

American academic administrator (1920–2016)

- Born: April 28, 1920; Chicago, Illinois, U.S.
- Died: August 24, 2016 (aged 96); San Diego, California, U.S.
- Education: Purdue University (BS, PhD); University of Chicago
- Occupations: Chemical engineer, academic administrator
- Known for: President of Wright State University, San Diego State University, and Kent State University
- Spouse: Hinda F. Wolf
- Children: 3, including Susan Golding

Brage Golding (April 28, 1920 - August 24, 2016) was an American chemical engineer and president of five universities including Wright State University, San Diego State University, and Kent State University. He was also the father of Susan Golding, a California politician and the mayor of San Diego.

== Early life and education ==
Brage Golding was born into a Jewish family on April 28, 1920, in Chicago. He earned a B.S. in chemical engineering from Purdue University and began graduate study in chemistry at the University of Chicago. He served over four years in the U.S. Army Field Artillery during World War II, and left the military as a major in 1946. Golding returned to Purdue and worked as an instructor in mathematics and Lilly Fellow in chemical engineering. He received a Ph.D. from Purdue in 1948.

== Career ==
One of Golding’s earliest jobs after his military service was as assistant director of research at the Lilly Varnish Company. He became director of research at the Lilly Varnish Company and visiting professor of engineering at Purdue in 1957. That year he published the textbook Polymers and Resins: Their Chemistry and Engineering. In 1959 he was appointed Dean of Purdue’s School of Chemical Engineering. He later served as vice president at both Miami University (Ohio) and the Ohio State University.

In 1966, Golding was appointed the first president of Wright State University. He became president of San Diego State University in 1972 and served there until 1977. He was president of Kent State University from 1977 to 1982. He later served as acting president at both Metropolitan State University of Denver and Western State University in Gunnison, Colorado.

== Awards and honors ==
- AAAS Fellow of the American Association for the Advancement of Science
- Honored by Wright State through the Brage Golding Distinguished Professor of Research

== Controversy ==
In 1975, Golding was the last president in the California State University system to oppose arming his campus police force. He authorized the change after a directive from the CSU chancellor. Golding also had disputes with the CSU chancellor and the California legislature during his tenure at SDSU.

At Kent State, Golding faced criticism over plans to build a gymnasium near the site of the 1970 shootings.

== Personal life and death ==
Golding was married to Hinda F. Wolf for 48 years until she died in 1989. Together they had one son and two daughters, including the politician Susan Golding. Golding died on August 24, 2016, in San Diego at age 96.

== Archival collections ==
Golding's archives are held in Special Collections in the Malcolm A. Love Library at San Diego State University and in the University Libraries at Kent State University.
