= Jerry Sanders (politician) =

American politician and law enforcement officer

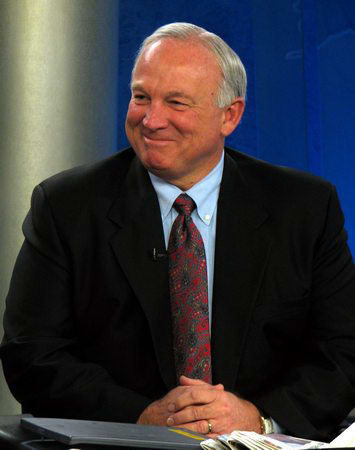

34th Mayor of San Diego
- In office December 5, 2005 – December 3, 2012
- Preceded by: Dick Murphy
- Succeeded by: Bob Filner

Personal details
- Born: July 14, 1950 (age 76) Los Angeles, California, U.S.
- Party: Republican (until 2021)
- Spouse: Rana Sampson (?–present)
- Children: 3
- Education: National University, San Diego State University

Gerald Robert "Jerry" Sanders (born July 14, 1950) is an American politician and retired law enforcement officer who served as the 34th mayor of San Diego from 2005 to 2012. A member of the Republican Party until 2021, he previously served as chief of the San Diego Police Department from 1993 to 1999.

Sanders served as president and CEO of the San Diego Regional Chamber of Commerce from 2012 to 2024, when he was succeeded by Chris Cate.

== Personal life ==
Sanders was born in San Pedro in Los Angeles, California. His alma maters are San Diego Miramar College, San Diego State University, and National University. He was also a member of the Sigma Alpha Epsilon fraternity while at San Diego State. Sanders lives in the Kensington neighborhood of San Diego with his wife Rana Sampson. He has two daughters, Lisa and Jamie. His brother, Tom Sanders, was an Oscar-nominated production designer.

== San Diego Police ==
During his senior year at San Diego State University, Jerry Sanders became a police officer with the San Diego Police Department. He served in the police department from 1973 until 1999, and served as chief of police from 1993 until 1999. As chief of police, Sanders and the department's employees gained national recognition for work with community policing and achieving a 40% decrease in crime, including a 67% drop in murders during his six-year term as chief. Sanders also re-organized the department, making it more responsive to the community, reaching out to neighborhoods, and utilizing more than 1,000 volunteers to address San Diego's public safety needs. Prior to his assignments as division commander, police captain, Sanders, then police lieutenant, was the police academy commander at the San Diego Criminal Justice Training Center - Police Academy at Miramar College.

He was commander of the San Diego SWAT team at the time of the 1984 San Ysidro McDonald's massacre, and his management of the tragedy, which resulted in twenty-one deaths, earned him criticism from the city's Mexican-American community. As a result, the newspaper La Prensa San Diego called Sanders "unfit to be mayor."

== Community service ==
Sanders left the Police Department in 1999 to become president and CEO of the United Way of San Diego County. He also served as United Way Community Campaign Chair in 2002.

In July 2002, Sanders was appointed to the board of the American Red Cross San Diego/Imperial Counties Chapter after the previous CEO was fired in the aftermath of controversy concerning a wildfire in Alpine, California. Sanders helped recruit retired Navy Rear Admiral Ronne Froman to be CEO, and supported the turnaround of the local chapter, which resulted in support for victims of the Cedar wildfire, praise from former critics for the transparency of fund raising efforts, and a staff re-organization that substantially reduced overhead costs.

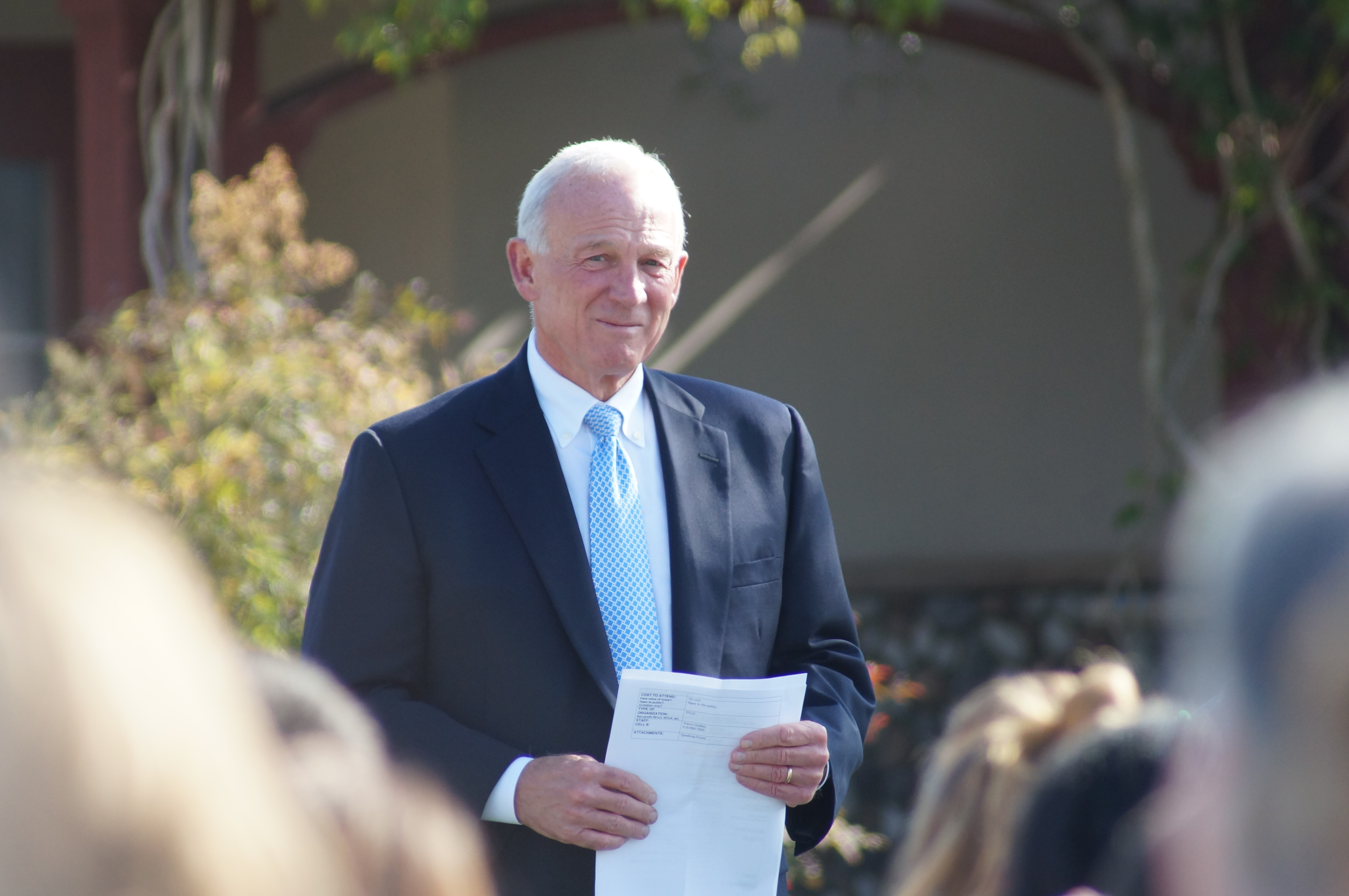
The mayor waiting to speak at the graduation ceremony of the San Diego Center for Children, 2012

Sanders had also been active in the private sector, serving as founding partner and consultant for local high-tech start-ups involved with homeland security and infrastructure assessment. He is currently board chair of the San Diego Police Foundation, established to raise private funds for SDPD equipment and programs. He serves on the board of STAR/PAL, the San Diego Chapter of the National Multiple Sclerosis Society, San Diego State University's Dean's advisory board, and Coronado First Bank (in organization). Sanders has served on the Wells Fargo Community Bank Board, the Mediation Center's Board, the National Conference for Community and Justice Board, the Vera Institute of Justice's advisory board on Foster Children, and the Children's Initiative. Sanders has been nominated to the National Red Cross Board of Governors.

== Mayor ==
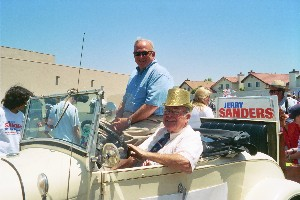
Jerry Sanders in the 2005 4th of July Parade in the Mira Mesa neighborhood of San Diego with John Witt, County Board of Education, driving

Jerry Sanders was elected mayor in a special run-off election held November 8, 2005, following the resignation of Mayor Dick Murphy in the wake of the San Diego pension scandal. He received 54% of the vote against city council member Donna Frye. Sanders was the first mayor under San Diego's "strong mayor system" of city government. Sanders is a member of the Mayors Against Illegal Guns Coalition, an organization formed in 2006 and co-chaired by New York City mayor Michael Bloomberg and Boston mayor Thomas Menino. Coincidentally, when Bloomberg left the Republican Party in 2007, San Diego became the largest U.S. city with a Republican mayor.

On September 19, 2007, Sanders abruptly reversed his public opposition to same-sex marriage before signing a City Council resolution aimed at overturning the state's ban on same-sex weddings. He gave a tearful speech in which he explained that he could not tell his daughter Lisa, who is gay, that her relationship with a partner is not as important as that of a straight couple and that he had "decided to lead with my heart...to take a stand on behalf of equality and social justice."

Sanders won reelection over businessman Steve Francis in 2008. He left office on December 3, 2012, due to term limits. The next day he became the president and CEO of the San Diego Regional Chamber of Commerce.

== In popular culture ==
- In the 2012 episode "Butterballs" of the sixteenth season of South Park, Sanders appears in a music video about masturbating in San Diego (a reference to Jason Russell) where he's promoting the city and suggests people should "try spanking it in one of our charming city streets" and its new motto "come, take a load off".

Political offices
Preceded by Toni Atkins (acting)	Mayor of San Diego, California; 2005–2012	Succeeded by Bob Filner
