= Calvert Institute for Policy Research =

American think tank

Calvert Institute for Public Policy
- Formation: 1995
- Founder: Douglas P. Munro; Ronald W. Dworkin
- Location: Baltimore, Maryland
- Executive Director: George W. Liebmann
- Website: www.calvertinstitute.org

The Calvert Institute for Policy Research is a think tank based in Baltimore, Maryland, that espouses limited government ideas.
