= 2000 San Diego mayoral election =

- November 7, 2000
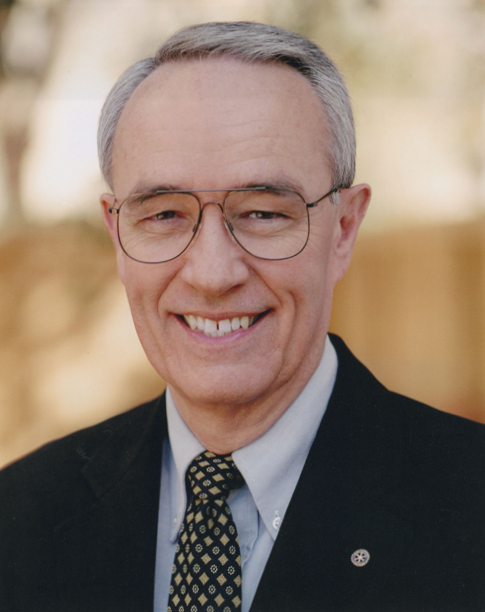

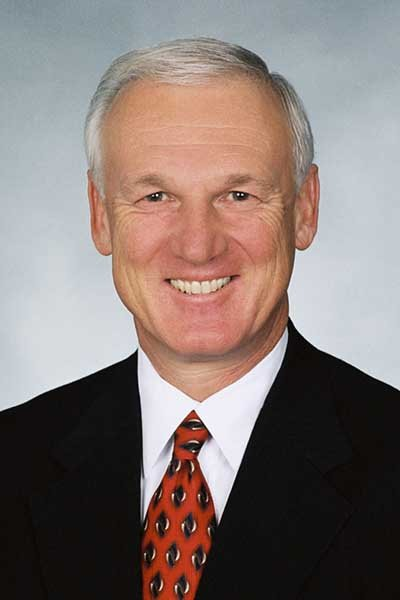
Nominee	Dick Murphy	Ron Roberts
Party	Republican	Republican
Popular vote	203,048	189,939
Percentage	51.6%	48.3%
Mayor before election
Susan Golding
Republican
Elected mayor
Dick Murphy
Republican

The 2000 San Diego mayoral election was held on Tuesday, November 7, 2000, to elect the mayor of San Diego. Incumbent mayor Susan Golding was ineligible to run for reelection due to term limits.

Municipal elections in California are officially non-partisan, though some candidates do receive funding and support from various political parties. The non-partisan primary was held Tuesday, March 7, 2000. County supervisor Ron Roberts and superior court judge Dick Murphy received the most votes and advanced to the November general election. Murphy was elected mayor with a majority of the votes in the November runoff election.

== Candidates ==
- Dick Murphy, superior court judge (Voter registration: Republican)
- Ron Roberts, San Diego County supervisor and mayoral candidate in 1992 (Voter registration: Republican)
- Peter Q. Davis, banker (Voter registration: Republican)
- Barbara Warden, San Diego City Council member (Voter registration: Republican)
- George Stevens, San Diego City Council member (Voter registration: Democratic)
- Byron Wear, San Diego City Council member (Voter registration: Republican)
- Jim Bell, environmental designer (Party Preference: Democratic)
- Janice Jordan (Party Preference: Peace and Freedom Party)
- Loch David Crane
- Glen D. Adkins
- Robert H. Schmitt
- Jim Hart, aircraft mechanic and perennial candidate (Voter registration: Republican)

== Campaign ==
With incumbent mayor Susan Golding termed out and ineligible to run, the primary election attracted a crowded field of candidates. Despite Democrats in San Diego holding 39% to 36.5% lead in registered voters, all but one of the candidates considered serious contenders by the media were Republicans. Many of the candidates had ties to Pete Wilson, the former mayor of San Diego, U.S. senator, and California governor. County supervisor Ron Roberts advanced to the November runoff with 25% of the primary vote. He was joined by Superior Court Judge Dick Murphy, who narrowly defeated banker Peter Q. Davis for second place and a place in the runoff with 15% of the vote.

Due to his advantages in fund raising, endorsements, political experience and his comfortable lead in the primary election Roberts was initially considered the front runner. However, Murphy was able to pull even by campaigning as an incorruptible political independent compared to his "career politician" opponent. Sports also played a large role in the general election campaign, including controversy over a deal where the city agreed to pay the San Diego Chargers for unsold tickets and city participation in the financing of a new stadium for the San Diego Padres.

Murphy ultimately defeated Roberts 52% to 48% and was elected mayor.

== Primary election results ==
San Diego mayoral primary election, 2000
Party	Candidate	Votes	%
Republican	Ron Roberts	69,059	25.7
Republican	Dick Murphy	42,103	15.7
Republican	Peter Q. Davis	41,937	15.6
Republican	Barbara Warden	40,716	15.2
Democratic	George Stevens	27,983	10.4
Republican	Byron Wear	24,214	9.0
Democratic	Jim Bell	8,779	3.3
Peace and Freedom	Janice Jordan	5,370	2.0
Nonpartisan	Loch David Crane	3,323	1.2
Nonpartisan	Glen D. Adkins	1,976	0.7
Nonpartisan	Robert H. Schmitt	1,547	0.6
Republican	Jim Hart	1,507	0.6
Total votes		292,904	100

== General election results ==
San Diego mayoral general election, 2000
Party	Candidate	Votes	%
Republican	Dick Murphy	203,048	51.6
Republican	Ron Roberts	189,939	48.3
Nonpartisan	H. Diane Dixon (write-in)	172	0.1
Total votes		393,939	100
