= National University System Institute for Policy Research =

The National University System Institute for Policy Research, established in 2006 as the San Diego Institute for Policy Research (SDI), formulates and promotes high quality economics, policy, and public opinion research. It aims to improve the efficiency and effectiveness of local governments in San Diego County and to improve the quality of life enjoyed by the region's citizens. It was established in San Diego by businessman and entrepreneur Steve Francis. In 2009 the San Diego Institute for Policy Research was absorbed into the National University System, a San Diego–based private nonprofit university, and became known as the National University System Institute for Policy Research.

Since its founding in 2006, the institute has published a bi-monthly update on the San Diego Economy, several policy briefs on issues impacting San Diego, a half-dozen longer monographs and done extensive polling with CERC. The institute also publishes a weekly column in the San Diego Daily Transcript.

SDI's president and CEO W. Erik Bruvold was formerly the Vice President for Public Policy for the San Diego Regional Economic Development Corporation.
