= Mike Aguirre =

American politician (born 1949)

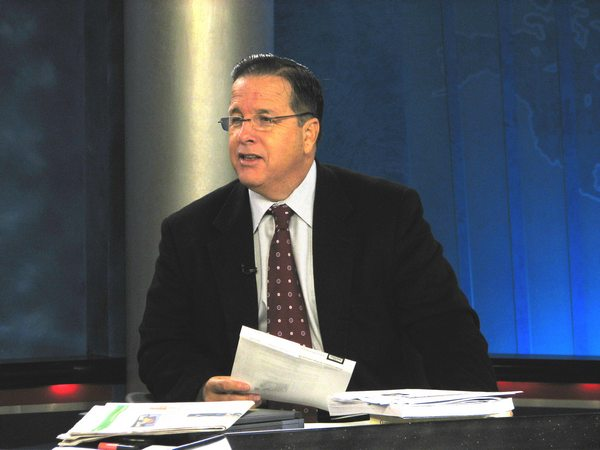

City Attorney of San Diego
- In office 2004–2008
- Preceded by: Casey Gwinn
- Succeeded by: Jan Goldsmith

Personal details
- Party: Democratic
- Education: Arizona State University (BA); University of California, Berkeley (JD)
- Profession: Lawyer; Politician

Jules Michael Aguirre (born 1949), more commonly known as Michael Jules Aguirre, is a politician who was the San Diego City Attorney from 2004 to 2008.

In 2013, he was a candidate for mayor in a special election following Mayor Bob Filner's resignation. He lost to Kevin Faulconer, placing fourth in a field of eleven candidates.

== Early life ==
Aguirre was born to Julio and Margaret Aguirre. His father was of Spanish descent and his mother was of Mexican descent.

== Early career ==
Aguirre worked as Assistant U.S. Attorney for the Department of Justice and directed a grand jury investigation of pension racketeering. He was then appointed as assistant counsel to the U.S. Senate's Permanent Subcommittee on Investigations. After leaving government work, Aguirre set up his own firm specializing in securities fraud.

In the 1990s, Aguirre continued his securities practice and his electoral campaigns. In 1990, Aguirre allied with the Chicano Movement to file a successful federal voting rights lawsuit to overturn San Diego’s redistricting. In 1993, Aguirre successfully defended the United Farm Workers Union in Yuma, Arizona, in a case with lettuce grower Bruce Church. Aguirre took over the defense of the case after UFW President Cesar Chavez died following two days of testimony. Aguirre finished the jury trial, which the UFW lost, but he succeeded in getting the case overturned on appeal.

In 1996, Aguirre went to court to throw out a 1995 contract between the City of San Diego and the San Diego Chargers football team. In the contract, the city agreed to issue $60 million of bonds to renovate the football team's stadium, and, in a controversial clause, promised to constantly maintain the stadium as a state-of-the-art venue. The city had also agreed to guarantee the sale of 60,000 game tickets at prices to be set by the Chargers. Aguirre’s suit and the ensuing scandal surrounding the maintenance clause compelled the city to renegotiate with the Chargers in 1998.

== City Attorney ==
Aguirre ran for San Diego City Attorney in 2004, in the midst of a financial crisis and investigations by the Securities and Exchange Commission. Scandal had erupted in the summer of 2003 over a pension deal that municipal employees received between 1996 and 2002. Workers were given increased benefits during this period, but the city did not contribute enough to municipal pension funds to cover the increased benefits. The resulting deficit of some $1.4 billion left the city’s finances in shambles and made it virtually impossible to issue municipal bonds. Aguirre ran as a "clean up the mess" outsider, with support from Democrats in the officially nonpartisan race, and won with 50.4% of the vote. A 2008 Wall Street Journal article praised Aguirre’s efforts to address the City of San Diego's hundreds of millions of dollars of unfunded pension liabilities.

In October 2007, The San Diego Union-Tribune reported that during the California wildfires of October 2007, Aguirre had called for an evacuation of the entire City of San Diego. Aguirre was heavily criticized for the idea but said that the paper had distorted his position. Aguirre's claim was that he had written a memo to the San Diego Mayor at the height of the fires, advising that the city should draw up a voluntary evacuation plan in light of federal regulations, the immediate threat of the fire, as well as concerns over weather conditions and air quality.

As City Attorney, Aguirre filed a legal action to force a developer to reduce the height of an already constructed office building near an airport. Federal Aviation Administration officials had later determined that the height of the building posed a threat to public safety, even if a city building permit had been issued. In 2009, a California Superior Court judge affirmed the City Attorney's position by determining the developer had no legal right to erect the building to the unsafe height, and the top several stories were ordered to be removed from the building.

In 2005, immediately upon taking office, Aguirre attempted unsuccessfully to overturn a city grant of $900 million in pension benefits to police and other city workers, which Aguirre contended had been illegal.

Aguirre sued Countrywide Financial in July 2008 over lending practices and convinced a federal multi-district litigation judicial panel to move all Countrywide Financial foreclosure cases to the jurisdiction of the City of San Diego.

In 2008, Aguirre ran for a second term as City Attorney but was challenged by several other candidates. The president of the San Diego City Council Scott Peters ran with the backing of city unions, while Superior Court Judge Jan Goldsmith was backed by the Republican political establishment. In the five-candidate nonpartisan primary election in June 2008, Aguirre qualified for the general election by coming in second place after Goldsmith. In the general election on November 4, 2008, Aguirre lost to Goldsmith: 59.5 percent to 40.5 percent.

== After leaving office ==
After leaving his post as City Attorney, Aguirre returned to private legal practice by forming the law firm of Aguirre Morris & Severson, along with two colleagues from the City Attorney's office: Mia Severson, who had headed the City Attorney's civil litigation division; and Chris Morris, who had headed the City's Criminal Division. Aguirre also started the National Center for Regulatory Reform, which has issued extensive reports on the Market Crash of 2008.

Following the resignation of Mayor Bob Filner in August 2013, Aguirre declared his intention to run in the special election for mayor to replace him. In the primary election held November 19, 2013, Aguirre came in a distant fourth with 4.44 percent of the vote, and thus did not advance to the runoff election held in November.

In 2014, Aguirre represented a woman named Ruth Hendricks who was challenging the $4.7 billion settlement deal for the failed San Onofre nuclear plant in San Diego County. His questions during the settlement approval process were not addressed. By 2015, his questions about backchannel dealings between regulators and utility companies were being taken more seriously, as criminal investigators seized notes from a secret meeting in Poland where the framework of a San Onofre deal was first discussed.

== Electoral history ==
2004 San Diego City Attorney election
Candidate	First-round		Runoff	
Candidate	Votes	%	Votes	%
Michael J. Aguirre	104,610	45.93	206,594	50.23
Leslie Devaney	63,664	27.95	203,301	49.43
Deborah L. Berger	59,335	26.05		
Total	227,782	100	411,332	100

2008 San Diego City Attorney election
Candidate	First-round		Runoff	
Candidate	Votes	%	Votes	%
Jan Goldsmith	68,326	32.22	278,830	52.89
Michael J. Aguirre (incumbent)	61,257	28.89	189,628	40.38
Scott Peters	43,295	20.42		
Brian Maienschein	26,267	12.39		
Amy J. Lepine	12,687	5.98		
Total	212,035	100	469,663	100

2013–14 San Diego mayoral special election
Candidate	First-round		Runoff	
Candidate	Votes	%	Votes	%
Kevin Faulconer	101,953	42.08	153,491	52.89
David Alvarez	65,740	27.13	136,701	47.11
Nathan Fletcher	58,355	24.09		
Mike Aguirre	10,783	4.45		
Lincoln Pickard	1,144	0.47		
Bruce Coons	1,012	0.42		
S. "Simon" Moghadam	748	0.31		
Hud Collins	647	0.27		
Michael A. Kemmer	612	0.25		
Harry Dirks	434	0.18		
Tobiah L. Pettus	344	0.14		
Total	242,282	100	290,192	100
