= 2000 United States elections =

- ← 1998 1999 2000 2001 2002 → Presidential election year
- Election day: November 7, 2000
- Incumbent president: ▌Bill Clinton (D)
- Next Congress: 107th

Presidential election
- Partisan control: Republican gain
- Popular vote margin: Democratic +0.5%
- Electoral vote
- George W. Bush (R): 271
- Al Gore (D): 266
- 2000 presidential election results. Red denotes states won by Bush, blue denotes states won by Gore. Numbers indicate the electoral votes won by each candidate.

Senate elections
- Overall control: Republican hold (Note: Republicans briefly lost their Senate majority in January 2001 when the 107th Congress was seated, but they regained their majority that same month when Republican Dick Cheney was sworn in as vice president. Democrats gained the majority in the Senate in May 2001 after Senator Jim Jeffords left the Republican Senate Caucus.)
- Seats contested: 34 of 100 seats (33 Class I seats +1 special election)
- Net seat change: Democratic +4
- 2000 Senate results Republican hold Republican gain Democratic hold Democratic gain

House elections
- Overall control: Republican hold
- Seats contested: All 435 voting members
- Popular vote margin: Republican +0.5%
- Net seat change: Democratic +1
- 2000 House of Representatives results (territorial delegate races not shown); Republican hold Republican gain Democratic hold Democratic gain Independent hold Independent gain

Gubernatorial elections
- Seats contested: 14 (12 states, 2 territories)
- Net seat change: Democratic +1
- 2000 gubernatorial election results Republican hold Democratic gain Democratic hold Popular Democratic gain Nonpartisan

Elections were held in the United States on November 7, 2000. Republican governor George W. Bush of Texas defeated Democratic Vice President Al Gore of Tennessee in the presidential election. Republicans retained control of both houses of Congress, giving the party unified control of Congress and the presidency for the first time since the 1954 elections.

With Democratic President Bill Clinton term-limited, Gore won his party's nomination by defeating Senator Bill Bradley in the Democratic primaries. Bush defeated Senator John McCain in the Republican primaries to win his party's presidential nomination. Bush took 271 of the 538 electoral votes, winning the decisive state of Florida by a margin of 537 votes after a recount was halted by the Supreme Court in the case of Bush v. Gore. Bush was the first winning presidential candidate to lose the popular vote since the 1888 presidential election. This marked the first time since 1992 where the winning presidential candidate's party failed to have any coattails in either house of Congress, and the first time since 1988 where this happened with the winning Republican candidate; Bush's father George H. W. was elected president that year.

Democrats picked up a net of four seats in the Senate, tying Republicans, but Dick Cheney provided the tie-breaking vote as Vice President of the United States. Republicans maintained control of the chamber until June 6, 2001, when Senator Jim Jeffords left the Republican Party and began caucusing with the Democrats. Democrats also picked up a net of one seat in the House, but Republicans retained an overall narrow majority. In the gubernatorial elections, Democrats won a net gain of one seat.

== Federal elections ==
=== President ===
In the 2000 presidential election, Republican Texas Governor George W. Bush defeated Democratic incumbent vice president Al Gore. The election was eye-catchingly close, but was the third straight election where neither party won a majority of the popular vote.

=== United States Senate ===
The 33 seats in the United States Senate Class 1 were up for election plus one special election. Democrats picked up net of four seats. Six senators were defeated in the November 2000 election. The five defeated Republicans included Spencer Abraham of Michigan, John Ashcroft of Missouri, Slade Gorton of Washington, Rod Grams of Minnesota, and William V. Roth of Delaware. The single defeated Democrat was Charles S. Robb of Virginia.

The Senate elections left both parties with control of fifty Senate seats. In the subsequent 107th United States Congress, Democrats controlled the Senate from January 3, 2001, to January 20, 2001, when Dick Cheney was sworn in as vice president. Republicans maintained control of the chamber until June 6, 2001, when Senator Jim Jeffords left the Republican Party and began caucusing with the Democrats.

=== United States House of Representatives ===
Republicans won the national popular vote for the House of Representatives by a margin of 0.5 points. Republicans lost two seats in the House, while Democrats gained one seat, and one independent, Virgil Goode, was elected. Following the 2000 election, the majority of the House seaters in the South and Midwest were held by the Republican party, while the larger number of seats in the Northeast and West were held by the Democratic party.

== State elections ==
=== Gubernatorial elections ===
One sitting governor was defeated in the November 2000 general election. Cecil H. Underwood, Republican of West Virginia, concluded the 2000 election with a 47.2 election percentage. Democrat Bob Wise was elected to a four-year term.

=== State legislative elections ===
Elections to state legislatures were held on November 7, 2000, simultaneously with the 2000 United States presidential election. Elections were held for 86 legislative chambers in 44 states, simultaneous to those states' gubernatorial elections. Election occurred in both chambers of each state's legislature, except for Alabama, Louisiana, Maryland, Mississippi, New Jersey, and Virginia. Michigan held elections for the lower house. Six territorial chambers in four territories and the District of Columbia were up as well. These elections determined the redistricting process after the 2000 census.

Democrats won control of the Colorado Senate for the first time since 1963. Republicans won control of the Missouri Senate for the first time since 1949, the New Hampshire Senate (which was previously tied), the South Carolina Senate for the first time since 1879 (which also meant they controlled both chambers of the state legislature for the first time since 1877), and the Vermont House of Representatives. Additionally, a coalition government replaced the Republican-controlled Arizona Senate, and the Democratic-controlled Maine Senate became tied.

=== Ballot initiatives ===
Vote for same-sex marriage ban by counties: 90–100% 80–90% 70–80% 60–70% 50–60%

- State constitutional amendments prohibiting same-sex marriage and civil unions was passed in Nebraska. Nevada passed a constitutional ban on same-sex marriage only, but it did not go into effect because the Nevada Constitution requires two ballot votes for citizen-initiated constitutional amendments.

== Local elections ==
=== Mayoral elections ===
Some of the major American cities that held their mayoral elections in 2000 included:

- San Diego – Superior Court Judge Dick Murphy (R) was elected to a first term as mayor.
