= 2005 San Diego mayoral special election =

- November 8, 2005
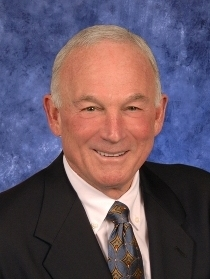

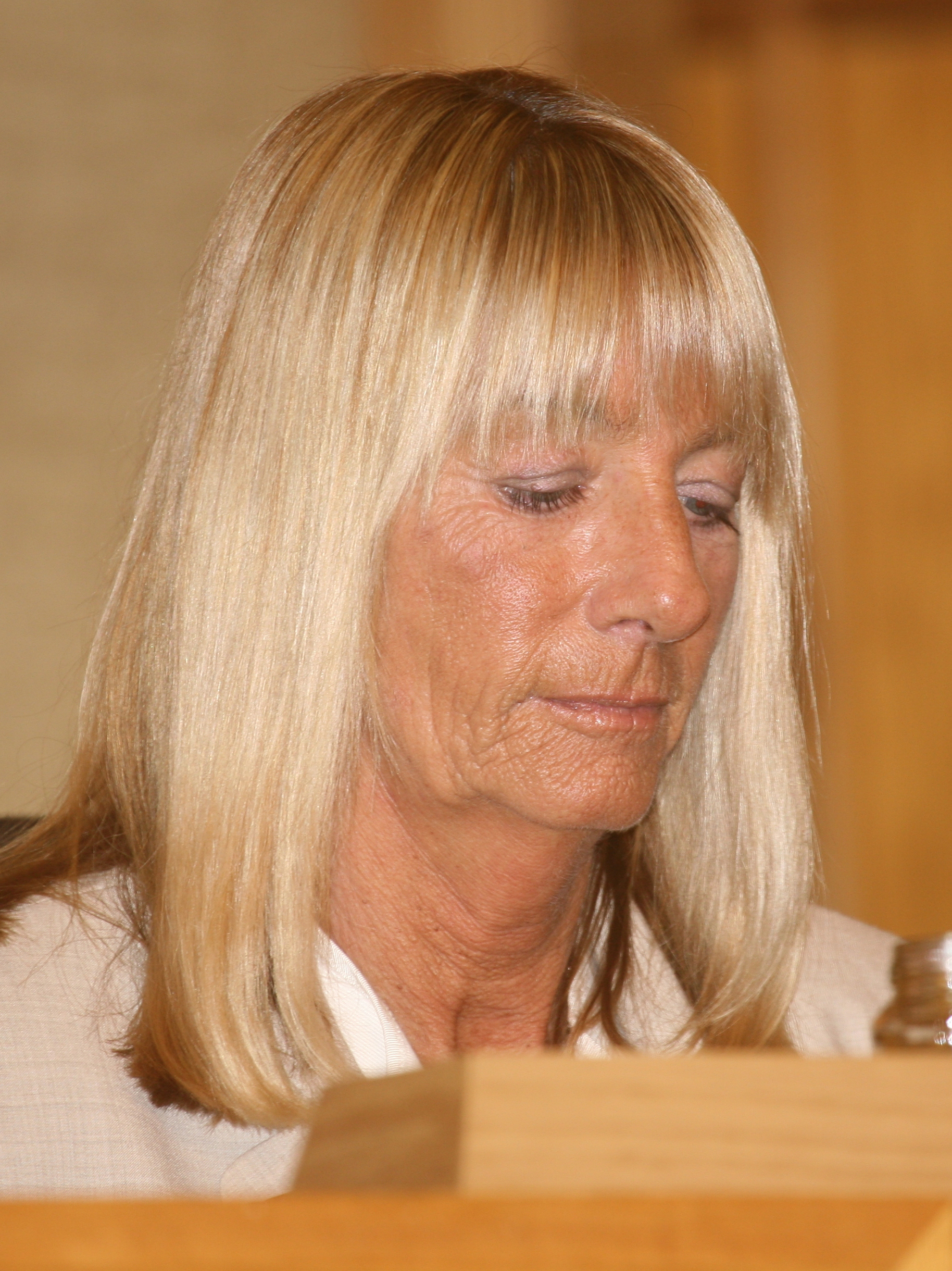
Nominee	Jerry Sanders	Donna Frye
Party	Republican	Democratic
Popular vote	176,893	152,105
Percentage	53.6%	46.1%
Mayor before election
Toni Atkins (acting)
Democratic
Elected Mayor
Jerry Sanders
Republican

The 2005 San Diego mayoral special election was a special election held on Tuesday, November 8, 2005, to elect the mayor for San Diego. The special election was necessary due to the resignation of former Mayor Dick Murphy.

Municipal elections in California are officially non-partisan, though some candidates do receive funding and support from various political parties. The non-partisan special primary was held Tuesday, June 3, 2008. San Diego City Council member Donna Frye and former San Diego police chief Jerry Sanders received the most votes and advanced to the November special general election. Sanders was elected mayor with a majority of the votes in November.

== Dick Murphy resignation ==
On April 25, 2005, Dick Murphy announced that he would resign as mayor of San Diego, effective July 15, 2005. Murphy had only recently been reelected as mayor in the highly contested 2004 mayoral election. Murphy's resignation occurred during investigations by the SEC and the FBI into the San Diego pension scandal. The city held a special election to fill the vacancy at mayor. Following Murphy's resignation, Michael Zucchet served as acting mayor for three days before he too resigned due to a corruption conviction that was later overturned. Council member Toni Atkins then served as acting mayor until the mayoral election was complete.

== Candidates ==
=== Declared ===
- Jerry Sanders, former San Diego police chief (Voter registration: Republican)
- Donna Frye, city council member (Voter registration: Democratic)
- Steve Francis, businessman (Voter registration: Republican)
- Pat Shea, lawyer (Voter registration: Republican)
- Richard Rider, retired stock broker and financial planner (Voter registration: Libertarian)
- Myke Shelby, Harley Davidson dealer (Voter registration: Republican)
- Shawn A. McMillan, lawyer (Voter registration: Republican)
- Jim Bell, environmental designer (Party preference: Democratic)
- Ed Kolker
- Jeremy Ledford
- Thomas Knapp

== Campaign ==
The special election to replace Murphy attracted a crowded field of eleven official candidates on the ballot. Donna Frye, a member of the San Diego City Council who had almost beaten Murphy with a write-in campaign in the 2004 election, was the only democrat among the top-tier candidates. Former police chief Jerry Sanders ran on a platform of executive experience, having successfully turned around the financial situations of the local chapters of the Red Cross and United Way since retiring as police chief. Steve Francis, founder and chairman of AMN Healthcare Services emphasized downsizing city government and implementing business principles. Francis outspent his rivals in the campaign, putting nearly $2 million of his own money into his campaign. Lawyer Pat Shea ran on a platform that San Diego should declare bankruptcy to deal with the pension scandal, a position that the other front runners disagreed with.

Frye won the plurality of votes in the July primary and advanced to the general election along with runner-up Sanders. However, Sanders and third-place finisher Francis, both republicans, combined for a majority of votes cast in the primary. After conceding the primary election, Francis endorsed Sanders for the general election. Sanders was elected mayor with a majority of the votes in the November general election.

== Primary election ==
=== Polling ===
Poll source	Date(s) administered	Sample size (Note: Key: A – all adults RV – registered voters LV – likely voters V – unclear)	Margin of error	Donna Frye (D)	Jerry Sanders (R)	Steve Francis (R)	Other	Undecided
SurveyUSA	July 22–24, 2005	804 (LV)	± 3.5%	45%	24%	23%	7%	1%

=== Results ===
San Diego mayoral special primary election, 2005
Party	Candidate	Votes	%
Democratic	Donna Frye	114,573	43.1
Republican	Jerry Sanders	71,767	27.0
Republican	Steve Francis	62,500	23.5
Republican	Pat Shea	6,299	2.4
Libertarian	Richard Rider	4,173	1.6
Republican	Myke Shelby	3,881	1.5
Republican	Shawn A. McMillan	619	0.2
Democratic	Jim Bell	529	0.2
Nonpartisan	Ed Kolker	452	0.2
Nonpartisan	Jeremy Ledford	425	0.2
Nonpartisan	Thomas Knapp	109	–
Total votes		265,573	100.0

== General election ==
=== Polling ===
Poll source	Date(s) administered	Sample size	Margin of error	Jerry Sanders (R)	Donna Frye (D)	Undecided
SurveyUSA	November 4–6, 2005	627 (LV)	± 4.0%	52%	47%	1%
SurveyUSA	October 28–30, 2005	532 (LV)	± 4.3%	50%	48%	3%
SurveyUSA	August 27–29, 2005	528 (LV)	± 4.3%	54%	44%	2%

=== Results ===
San Diego mayoral special general election, 2005
Party	Candidate	Votes	%
Republican	Jerry Sanders	176,893	53.6
Democratic	Donna Frye	152,105	46.1
Total votes		334,249	100.0
