= Steve Francis (businessman) =

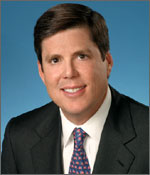

Nevada's 41st Assembly District Assemblyperson
- In office 1983–1987

Personal details
- Born: October 8, 1954 (age 71) Phoenix, Arizona, U.S.
- Party: Republican
- Occupation: Founder of AMN Healthcare
- Known for: Running for mayor of San Diego

Steven C. Francis (born October 8, 1954) is an American politician and businessman. He served in the Nevada State Assembly for five years and twice ran unsuccessfully for mayor of San Diego. He is a Republican. He is co-founder of AMN Healthcare.

== Personal life ==
Francis was born in 1954 in Phoenix, Arizona. He attended the University of Nevada, Las Vegas, graduating with a Bachelor of Science in 1978. He has lived in San Diego with his wife, Gayle, since 1987.

== Government experience ==
Steve Francis was elected to a seat in the Nevada State Assembly in 1982. At only 28, he was one of the youngest assemblypersons ever. His colleagues elected him majority leader in 1985, which he held until 1987.

During his tenure, he authored successful legislation to outlaw the sale and use of armor-piercing "cop-killer" bullets in the state. He also introduced legislation to reform the state's mental health system and establish a state commission on mental health.

He sponsored a bill to strengthen tenants' rights against unfair landlord practices.

After moving to San Diego, Francis unsuccessfully ran for mayor in 2005 and 2008.

== Business entrepreneurship ==
In 1985, he and Gayle, a registered nurse, founded AMN Healthcare, a nurse staffing business. In 1987 after completing his legislative service in Nevada, they relocated AMN Healthcare to San Diego. As AMN Healthcare grew in its early years, Steven and Gayle oversaw the company's development. From 1990 to 2005, Francis served as AMN's chief executive officer and he became chairman of the board in 2005. He retired from the board of directors in 2008.

During the 22 years of AMN's history, the company transitioned from a private enterprise to a national public company with over 2,000 corporate employees, with over 8,000 nurse and allied healthcare professionals providing staffing services to over 2,000 healthcare facility clients. Today, AMN (NYSE:AMN) is the nation's largest healthcare staffing firm and is traded on the New York Stock Exchange.

Francis also founded the San Diego Institute for Policy Research (which now resides at National University), a non-partisan organization that generates economic and policy research for the San Diego region.

Francis served as chairman of the board of Medical Solutions, Inc., a national healthcare staffing company from 2012 to 2015. Francis is currently executive chairman of the board of AHS Staffing. In addition, Francis is president of Francis Enterprises, LLC., a healthcare staffing advisory firm.

== Community leadership ==
Francis is a long-serving board member of Father Joe's Villages (chairman 2005–2015), which provides transitional housing for low-income families, rehabilitative services for the homeless, and residential and educational services for homeless teens. He has served in the past as the chairman of the San Diego Chapter of the American Red Cross as well as vice chairman of the local YMCA. In addition, he has served as a director for the San Diego Regional Chamber of Commerce and the San Diego Regional Economic Development Corporation.

== Awards and honors ==
Francis has been honored as a Father of the Year by the American Diabetes Association/San Diego Father's Day Council, as Patriot of the Year by the Boy Scouts of America San Diego-Imperial Council and as Corporate Director of the Year by the Corporate Directors Forum.
