= Susan Golding =

American politician (born 1945)

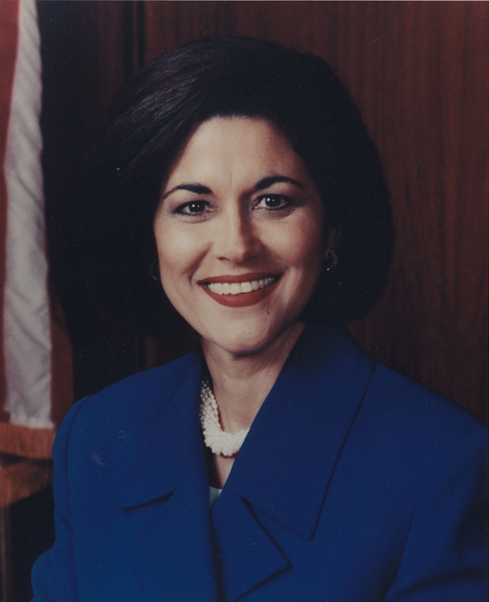

32nd Mayor of San Diego
- In office December 7, 1992 — December 4, 2000
- Preceded by: Maureen O'Connor
- Succeeded by: Dick Murphy

Chair of the San Diego County Board of Supervisors
- In office January 5, 1989 – January 5, 1990
- Preceded by: George Bailey
- Succeeded by: Leon Williams

Member of the San Diego County Board of Supervisors for the 3rd district
- In office 1985 – December 7, 1992
- Preceded by: Patrick Boarman
- Succeeded by: Pam Slater-Price

Member of the San Diego City Council from the 4th district
- In office January 23, 1981 – April 6, 1983
- Preceded by: Bill Lowery
- Succeeded by: Gloria McColl

Personal details
- Born: August 18, 1945 (age 81) Muskogee, Oklahoma, U.S.
- Party: Republican
- Spouse(s): Stanley D. Prowse; Richard Silberman (1984–1991)
- Children: 2
- Education: Carleton College; Columbia University

Susan G. Golding (born August 18, 1945) is an American politician who served as the 32nd mayor of San Diego from 1992 to 2000. A member of the Republican Party, she previously served as a member of the San Diego County Board of Supervisors from 1985 to 1992 and as a member of the San Diego City Council from 1981 to 1983.

Golding currently serves president and CEO of the Child Abuse Prevention Foundation in San Diego. She also serves on the boards and advisory committees of the Pacific Council on International Policy and the International Republican Institute.

== Personal life ==
Golding was born in Muskogee, Oklahoma, and grew up in Lafayette and Indianapolis, Indiana. She earned a B.A. in Government & International Relations from Carleton College, and a M.A. from Columbia University. Her father, Brage Golding, was president of San Diego State University from 1972 to 1977, then became president of Kent State University until 1982.

Susan Golding married Stanley D. Prowse, an attorney. They moved to Atlanta, where she was a college instructor at Emory University. In 1974 they moved to California and she was Associate Publisher of NewsPress, a community newspaper. After they divorced, Golding raised her two children, Samuel and Vanessa, as a single mother under her maiden name.

On July 22, 1984, Susan Golding married Richard Silberman, a financier and prominent Democrat. They divorced in 1991 after Silberman was convicted of money laundering.

== Political life ==
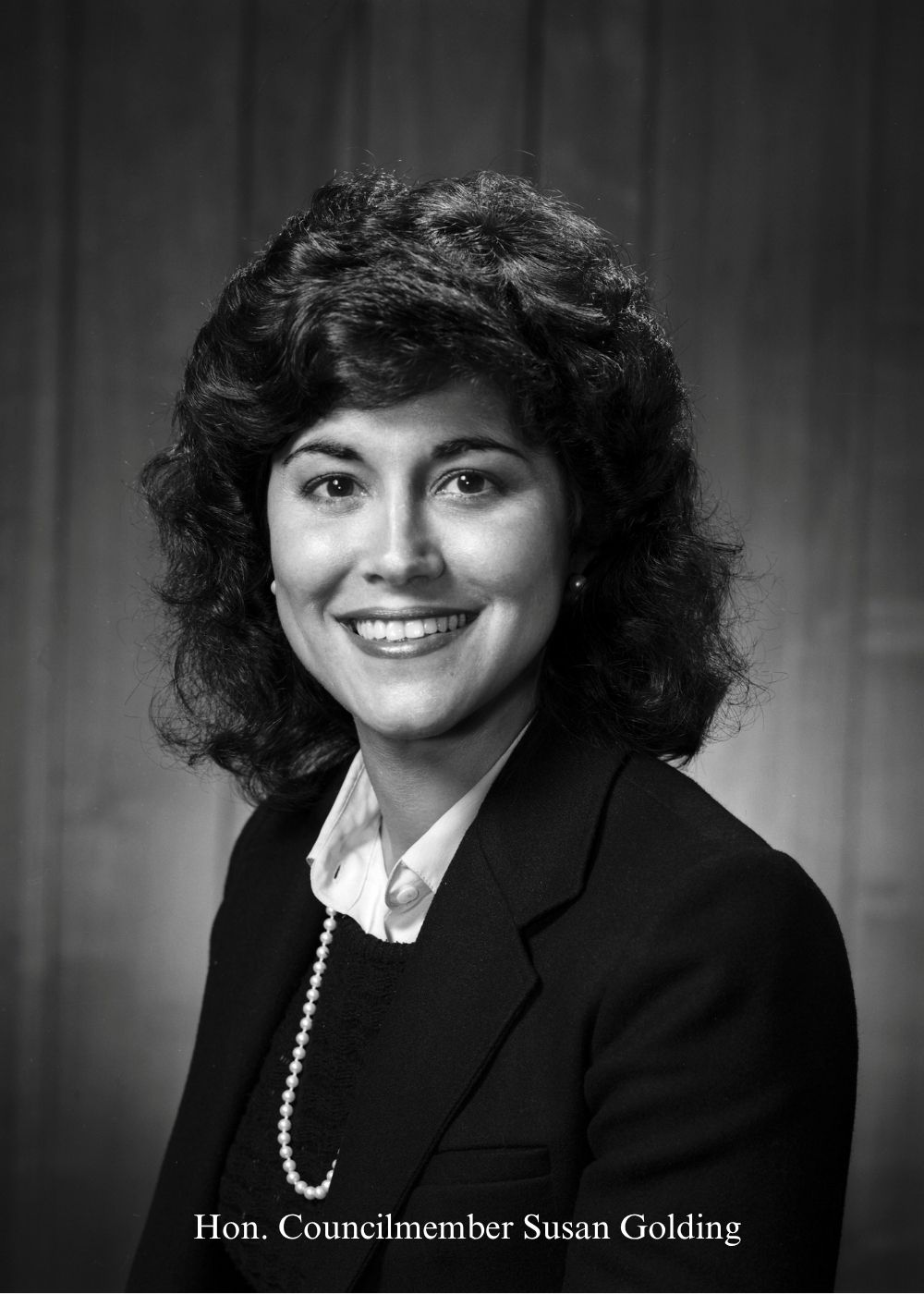
San Diego City Councilmember Susan Golding

Golding was appointed to the San Diego city council from in 1981, and then won re-election in 1982. In 1983 she briefly served in the Deukmejian administration in Sacramento, and in 1984 she was elected to the Board of Supervisors for San Diego County, California, serving 1985–1992.

In 1992, Golding was elected mayor of San Diego. She campaigned as a progressive Republican, as a supporter of gay rights, abortion rights, affirmative action, and increased environmental protections. Her first campaign was against political science professor Peter Navarro, whom she narrowly defeated. Peter Navarro had a campaign to restrain the "Los Angelization" of the county, by keeping more open space. He won the primary by a large measure but didn't reach the 50% threshold to avoid a runner-up election. The land developer and hospitality lobbies supported Golding against Navarro in the election.

Her major accomplishment as mayor was to streamline city government for businesses, including setting up a "one-stop" shop for permits. She helped set aside 52,000 acres (21,000 ha) in the city as part of a comprehensive Multiple Species Conservation Plan. She also increased police funding and patrols, created neighborhood service centers, and helped create the city's first winter shelter for the homeless. During her administration, she was instrumental in San Diego's successful bid to host the 1996 Republican National Convention at the San Diego Convention Center. This helped soothe the pain of losing the 1972 Republican National Convention, which was scheduled for San Diego but moved under scandal.

Golding and the city council faced a problem getting funding for the convention, however. They felt it was too politically risky to raise taxes or cut services. They were accused of paying less into the city's pension fund instead.

In 1996, political scientist Samuel L. Popkin was quoted as saying that Golding would likely have opportunities to run for higher office in California. She made a run for Barbara Boxer's Senate seat in 1998, but dropped out due to lagging polling numbers and fundraising difficulties.

In 1995, after the San Diego rampage in which a former US Marine stole a tank, Golding wrote a letter to the California demanding answers and demanding changes

In 1999, a grand jury accused Golding of misconduct related to the building of a new baseball stadium for the San Diego Padres in downtown San Diego. District Attorney Paul Pfingst later exonerated Golding of this charge.

=== 1989 Richard Silberman money scandal ===
In 1989, Golding's husband Richard Silberman, described by the Voice of San Diego as a major player in San Diego politics, was caught in a money laundering scheme by the FBI. The scheme involved $300,000 that was said to be Colombian drug money. Silberman was sent to prison, and Golding divorced him. The scandal did not adversely affect her subsequent run for mayor.

=== The Chargers deal ===
In 1995, Golding helped spearhead a deal to expand Jack Murphy Stadium in order to keep the San Diego Chargers in town and attract a second Super Bowl to the city. In it, the city agreed to expand the stadium, which was later renamed Qualcomm Stadium, and add 35 new luxury boxes. In exchange, the Chargers promised to stay in San Diego through 2020.

However, the deal also contained an agreement by the city to buy any tickets the Chargers didn't sell starting in the 1997 season—thus preventing Chargers home games from being blacked out in San Diego. Opponents of the deal got 50,000 signatures for a referendum on this portion of the deal, but the referendum was thrown out by a superior court judge. In part due to the controversy over the so-called "ticket guarantee", public anger over the failed Chargers deal and the related financial losses to San Diego was still high. A city term-limit ordinance prevented Golding from seeking a third term.

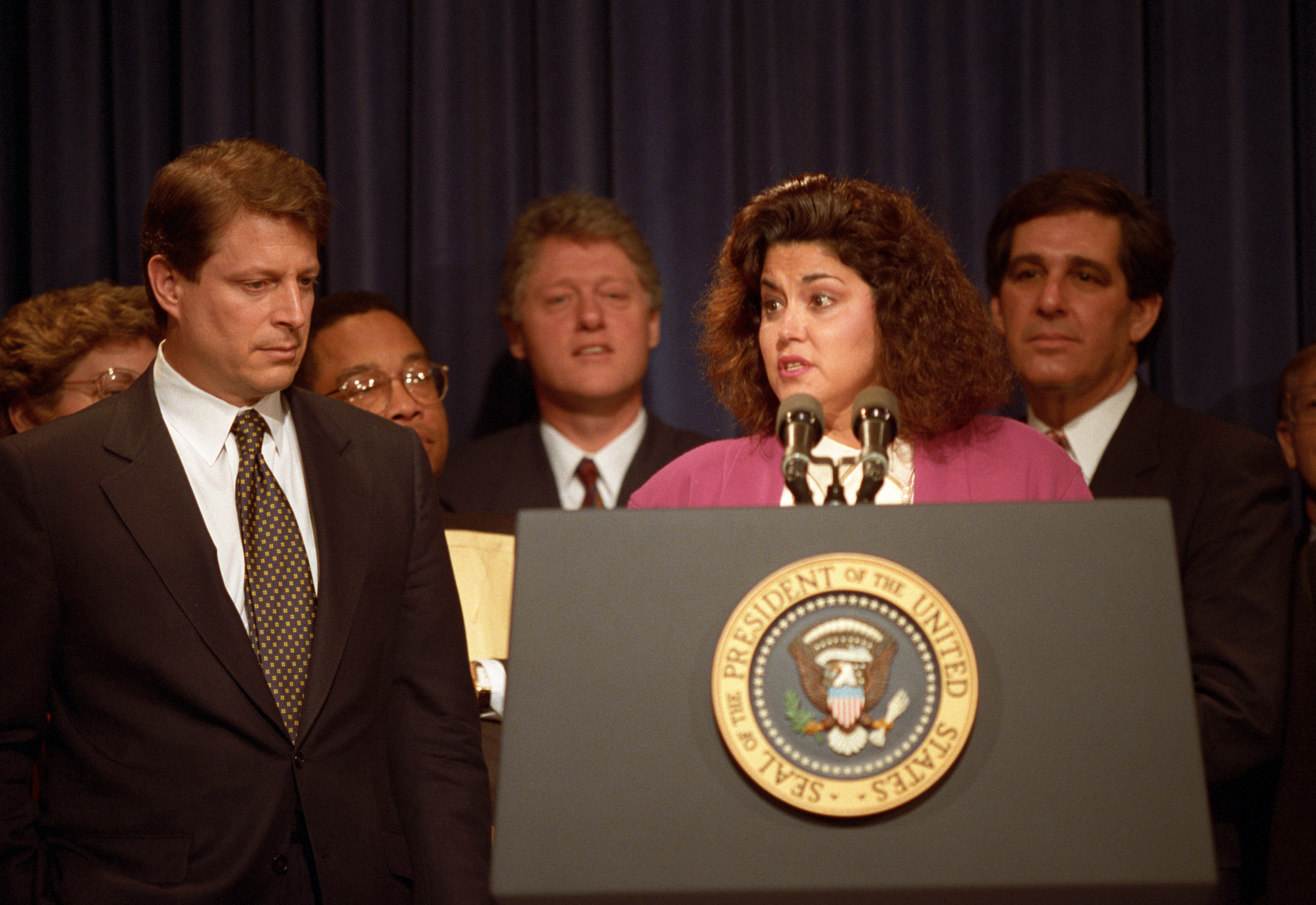
Bill Clinton in the Old Executive Office Building with mayors; while Golding is speaking on March 5, 1993.

== Later career ==
Golding went to work for a San Diego non-profit, "Promises 2 Kids", after leaving her political career behind. As of 2024 she is no longer affiliated with Promises2Kids ( Formerly “The Child Abuse Prevention Foundation”.

Political offices
Preceded by Maureen O'Connor	Mayor of San Diego, California; 1992–2000	Succeeded by Dick Murphy
