= 1992 San Diego mayoral election =

- November 3, 1992
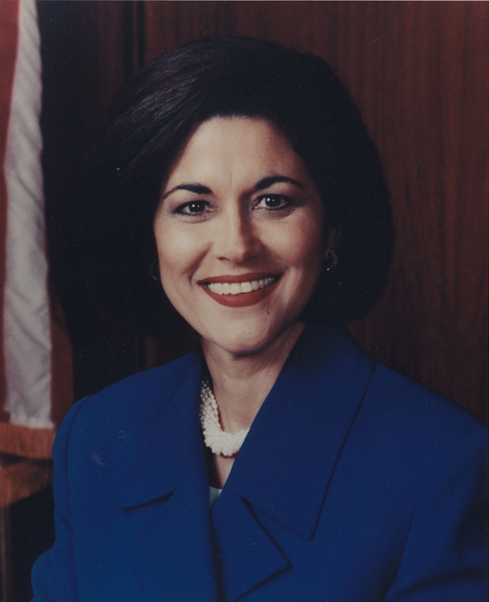

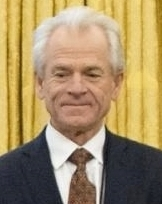
Nominee	Susan Golding	Peter Navarro
Party	Republican	Independent
Popular vote	222,603	205,448
Percentage	52.0%	48.0%
Mayor before election
Maureen O'Connor
Democratic
Elected mayor
Susan Golding
Republican

The 1992 San Diego mayoral election was held on November 3, 1992, to elect the mayor for San Diego. Incumbent mayor Maureen O'Connor chose not to run for reelection.

Municipal elections in California are officially non-partisan, though some candidates do receive funding and support from various political parties. The non-partisan primary was held June 2, 1992. Peter Navarro and Susan Golding received the most votes and advanced to the November general election. Golding was elected mayor with a majority of the votes in the November election.

== Candidates ==
- Susan Golding, San Diego County Supervisor (Party preference: Republican)
- Peter Navarro, business professor (Party preference: Independent)
- Ron Roberts, San Diego City Councilmember (Party preference: Republican)
- Tom Carter, businessman (Party preference: Democratic)
- Loch David Crane, magician, college instructor, and perennial candidate
- Bill Thomas, accountant (Party preference: Republican)

== Campaign ==
Incumbent mayor Maureen O'Connor announced in her 1990 State of the City address that she would not run for reelection, but would focus instead on political reforms including giving future mayors more power. She declined to endorse any of the candidates vying to replace her. Among the primary candidates, County Supervisor Susan Golding and City Councilmember Ron Roberts ran on their experience in local government. Economist Peter Navarro and businessman Tom Carter ran as political outsiders. Navarro also emphasized his advocacy for slow-growth policies as chairman of the grassroots organization Prevent Los Angelization Now! (PLAN). Navarro considered himself a conservative Republican, but had changed his affiliation to independent prior to the primary election.

In the primary election held June 2, 1992, Navarro placed first with 38.2 percent of the vote followed by Golding with 31.1 percent. Trailing far behind were Roberts with 16.4 percent, Carter with 9.8 percent and scattered votes for other minor candidates. As the top two vote-getters, Navarro and Golding advanced to the November ballot. Golding was then elected mayor with 52 percent of the votes on November 3, 1992.

== Primary election results ==
San Diego mayoral primary election, 1992
Party	Candidate	Votes	%
Independent	Peter Navarro	91,836	38.2
Republican	Susan Golding	74,863	31.1
Republican	Ron Roberts	39,321	16.4
Democratic	Tom Carter	23,525	9.8
Nonpartisan	Loch David Crane	6,711	2.8
Republican	Bill Thomas	4,149	1.8
Total votes		240,405	100

== General election results ==
San Diego mayoral general election, 1992
Party	Candidate	Votes	%
Republican	Susan Golding	222,603	52.0
Independent	Peter Navarro	205,448	48.0
Nonpartisan	Jim Turner (write-in)	382	–
Nonpartisan	Robert Reed (write-in)	28	–
Total votes		428,051	100
