= San Diego pension scandal =

The San Diego pension scandal was a multi-year scandal involving the City Employee's Retirement Pension Fund in San Diego, California.

== Situation background ==
The San Diego City Employees' Retirement System had been underfunded in some form for more than a decade. In 2001, as a result of years of sharp increases in pension benefits combined with decreases in pension funding and a decrease in the value of investments, the fund fell below certain funding targets.

== Revelation of the problem ==
Diann Shipione, a former trustee of the San Diego City Employees' Retirement System pension board, is credited with exposing unlawful underfunding of the pension fund to the media.

In 2002 Shipione, as a pension board trustee, raised concerns to the San Diego Mayor and City Council about a proposal that would essentially reduce money going into the retirement fund and increase money going out of it. This tactic went unnoticed due to an accounting trick that would be termed a "snake in the garden" by a city investigation report. The city aggressively used "surplus earnings", which are defined as realized returns on assets above the projected actuarial target, reallocating them to fund additional projects. However, as the investigative report notes, this creates a serious problem should returns fall below the actuarial target requirement for any length of time.

In 2003 Shipione raised additional concerns that an announced $500 million City of San Diego bond sale prospectus had material omissions about the pension fund.

City officials and other pension board members made efforts to discredit and sideline her. At one point they bought an ad in the San Diego Union-Tribune that scoffed, "Chicken Little Would Be Proud." In a continued effort to remove her from the retirement board, the Mayor and a City Council majority voted to ban investment advisors from the board; Shipione was the only investment advisor on the retirement board. Eventually the City Council rescinded its vote to ban investment advisors after the national press picked up coverage on the matter. Later, the city council decided to terminate the remaining terms of all members of the board and have the entire board replaced. Despite calls for Shipione to be appointed to the new board, she was not.

Conflict came to a peak on November 19, 2004, when she was ordered to leave a closed session board meeting of the trustees. A plan to place her under citizen's arrest and have police remove her was almost implemented, but she left as ordered. The other board members voted to file ethics charges against her, ask for her removal as a board member, and ban her from future meetings. The San Diego Ethics Commission later dismissed the complaints levied against her by the pension board.

Meanwhile, the United States Securities and Exchange Commission had begun investigations into the city's municipal bond disclosures regarding its pension and retiree health care obligations.

== Aftermath ==
The scandal had widespread fallout in the city's political and financial situation.

By 2005, several city officials had resigned, including the City Auditor, City Manager, City Treasurer and newly reelected Mayor Dick Murphy. Murphy was replaced in a special election by former police chief Jerry Sanders. Mike Aguirre, an advocate for pension reform, was elected city attorney. In addition, the scandal led to a voter approved proposition for complete change in the constitution of the pension board.

The City of San Diego became the target of two federal investigations following revelations in January 2004 that financial documents used to secure bonds had been filled with errors and omissions.

In November 2006, the SEC entered an order sanctioning the City of San Diego for committing securities fraud by failing to disclose to the investing public important information about its pension and retiree health care obligations in the sale of its municipal bonds in 2002 and 2003. To settle that action, the City agreed to cease and desist from future securities fraud violations and to retain an independent consultant for three years to foster compliance with its disclosure obligations under the federal securities laws.

In 2007 the SEC filed a civil injunctive action for fraud against outside auditors for the city and its pension system. The auditors consented to the entry of a final judgment permanently enjoining them from violating the antifraud provisions of federal securities laws and paid a civil penalty.

Notwithstanding the multi-year smear campaign and plan to arrest her concocted by city officials and pension board trustees, Diann Shipione was eventually proven right and received public recognition for her pension system related services from organizations such as: San Diego Retired City Employees' Association, Californians Aware, County of San Diego California Board of Supervisors, San Diego City Council, San Diego Mayor's Office, San Diego Regional Chamber of Commerce, League of Women Voters, California State Assembly, San Diego City Attorney, and the San Diego County Commission on the Status of Women.
