= Dick Murphy =

American mayor and judge (born 1942)

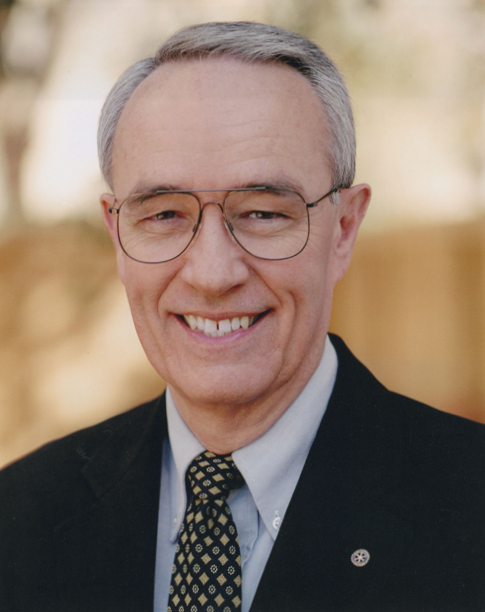

33rd Mayor of San Diego
- In office December 4, 2000 – July 15, 2005
- Preceded by: Susan Golding
- Succeeded by: Jerry Sanders

Personal details
- Born: Richard M. Murphy; December 16, 1942 (age 83) Oak Park, Illinois, U.S.
- Party: Republican
- Spouse: Jan Murphy (m. 1969)
- Children: 3
- Education: University of Illinois (BA); Harvard University (MBA); Stanford University (JD)

Richard M. Murphy (born December 16, 1942) is an American politician who served as the 33rd mayor of San Diego from 2000 to 2005. He is a member of the Republican Party.

== Early life and education ==
Murphy was born in 1942 in Oak Park, Illinois. He was captain of the varsity basketball team and Senior Class President of Proviso West High School in its first graduating class in 1961. He graduated Phi Beta Kappa from the University of Illinois with a degree in economics and served as president of the Alpha Tau Omega fraternity. He received his Master of Business Administration from Harvard University and his Doctor of Jurisprudence degree from Stanford University.

Murphy served as an officer in the U.S. Army, in the Pentagon and the White House as a military aide to the Nixon administration. In the early 1970s he moved to San Diego, where he was marketing director for Bank of America, and an attorney at the law firm of Luce, Forward, Hamilton & Scripps. In 1980, he was elected to the San Diego City Council, and served from 1981 through 1985 helping create Mission Trails Regional Park. In 1985, he was appointed municipal court judge by Governor George Deukmejian. In 1989, the governor elevated him to superior court judge where he served for more than a decade.

== Mayor ==
"I want to be mayor, but I don't need to be mayor. I'm not a career politician."

— Dick Murphy, during his 2000 campaign

Murphy was first elected mayor in November 2000. His election was a long shot against Ron Roberts, who had the support of the business community. He campaigned on providing "Leadership With 2020 Vision"—a promise to set forth a clear long-term vision for the city and to provide the leadership to implement that vision. Murphy had previously served one term on the San Diego City Council representing the Seventh District. While elections for municipal offices in California are non-partisan, he is a registered Republican.

During his first term in office, Murphy set ten goals for the city and had success in accomplishing many of them. The most significant included establishing the city's first ethics commission, completing construction of a new downtown ballpark for the San Diego Padres baseball team, forming the San Diego Regional Airport Authority, creating the San Diego River Conservancy, building the Veterans Memorial Garden in Balboa Park, jump starting plans for a new central library, and implementing a plan to underground all overhead utility lines in the city.

Murphy ran for a second term in 2004 again against Ron Roberts. His re-election campaign saw controversy with a last minute write-in candidate, Donna Frye, a member of the San Diego City Council. A number of voters did not follow the proper procedure for supporting a write-in candidate, either misspelling the name of Donna Frye (usually as "Donna Fry") or writing her name in the blank but neglecting to fill in the corresponding bubble to indicate their preference. After a legal imbroglio involving three (unsuccessful) lawsuits, these votes were ultimately not counted, resulting in Murphy winning the official tally by approximately 2,000 votes.

During Murphy's second term, the city faced serious fiscal problems from years of financial mismanagement by past city governments, problems including an underfunded pension program and a series of credit-score downgrades. Facing mounting criticism over his controversial election victory and failure to adequately address the pension underfunding problem, Murphy announced his plans to resign as Mayor and resigned July 15, 2005. Murphy has written a book about his experiences as mayor entitled "San Diego's Judge Mayor: How Murphy's Law Blindsided Leadership with 2020 Vision" Sunbelt Publications San Diego.

Political offices
Preceded by Susan Golding	Mayor of San Diego, California; 2000—2005	Succeeded by Michael Zucchet (acting)
