= Philip Boyd =

Philip Boyd or Phillip Boyd could refer to:

- Phil Boyd (1876–1967), Canadian Olympic athlete
- Philip L. Boyd (1900–1989), American businessman and regent of the University of California
  - Philip L. Boyd Deep Canyon Desert Research Center, a site in the University of California Natural Reserve System, named in honor of Boyd
