= Frank C. Prescott =

American politician

Brigadier Frank C. Prescott, N.G.C
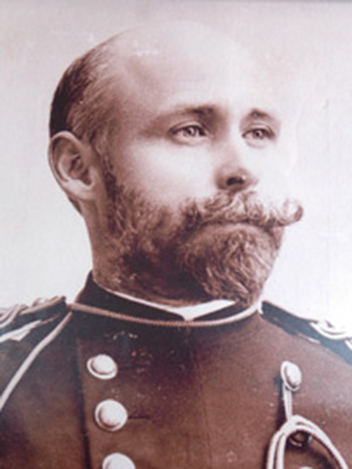

35th Speaker of the California State Assembly
- In office January 2, 1905 – January 1, 1906
- Preceded by: Arthur G. Fisk
- Succeeded by: Robert L. Beardslee Sr.

Member of the California State Assembly from the 76th district
- In office January 5, 1903 – January 1, 1906
- Preceded by: D. W. Hasson
- Succeeded by: William Fletcher Lemon

Personal details
- Born: November 15, 1859 Ottawa, Illinois, US
- Died: January 6, 1934 (aged 74) Los Angeles, California, US
- Party: Republican
- Spouse: Maria Virginia Delos Reyes Tebbetts
- Children: Frank Clarke Prescott, Jr.

Military service
- Branch/service: United States Army
- Battles/wars: Spanish–American War

Brigadier General Frank Clark Prescott, N.G.C. (November 15, 1859 – January 6, 1934) was a Republican politician who served in the California State Assembly from the 76th district from 1903 to 1907 and served as its Speaker from 1905 to 1906. He served in the United States Army during the Spanish–American War. He married Maria Virginia Delos Reyes Tebbetts (m. 13 Jan 1879) daughter of George Parrish Tebbetts (1828 – January 9, 1909) 3rd mayor of San Diego, California.
