= Ed Harris (politician) =

American lifeguard, union leader, and politician (born 1965)

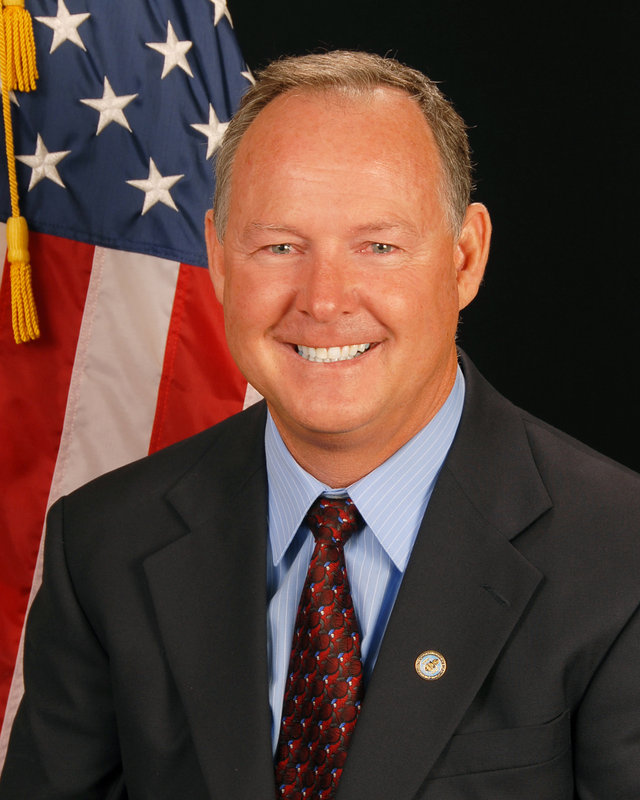

Member of the San Diego City Council from the 2nd district
- In office April 7, 2014 – December 10, 2014
- Preceded by: Kevin Faulconer
- Succeeded by: Lorie Zapf

Personal details
- Born: c. 1965
- Party: Democratic
- Profession: lifeguard and union leader

Military service
- Allegiance: United States
- Branch/service: United States Marine Corps
- Years of service: 1984–1988
- Rank: Corporal

Edward Brian Harris (born c. 1965) is an American politician, lifeguard, and union leader from San Diego, California. He was a member of the San Diego City Council representing City Council District 2, which includes the communities of Pacific Beach, Mission Beach, Ocean Beach, Point Loma, Bay Ho, Bay Park, Morena, and Midway. He was appointed to the City Council on April 7, 2014.

== Life and career ==
Harris received his high school diploma from Troy High School in Fullerton, California. He studied fire science at Palomar College.

Harris served in the U.S. Marine Corps from 1984 through 1988, attaining the rank of corporal. He has been a lifeguard for the City of San Diego since 1989. In addition to his duties as a lifeguard sergeant, Harris was also a longtime leader of the city's lifeguard union.

Harris is married, has two children, and lives in Point Loma.

== City Council ==
In the summer of 2013 Harris expressed interest in running for District 2 of the San Diego City Council. Harris is a Democrat, although City Council positions are officially nonpartisan per California state law. The seat was set to be vacated by its council member, Kevin Faulconer, due to term limits. Harris decided against running due to the concerns of his family.

In March 2014 the District 2 seat became vacant when Faulconer was elected mayor of San Diego in a special election to replace Bob Filner. Since there was less than a year remaining in Faulconer's term in office, the City Charter empowers the City Council to appoint a council member; however, that appointed member may not run in the subsequent election. Twenty people applied for the appointment. The City Council chose Harris on its second ballot by a 5-3 vote. He served the balance of the unfinished term until replaced by Lorie Zapf in December 2014. Describing himself as "a normal guy, a normal Joe," Harris said “I’m excited and I’m anxious to get to work. I will push for things that are important to people like crosswalks and clean beaches.”

In March 2016, Harris declared his intention to run in the 2016 San Diego mayoral election against incumbent Faulconer and Lori Saldaña. Harris came in third place with 19 percent of the vote in the June primary.

== Electoral history ==
2016 San Diego mayoral election
Candidate	Votes	%
Kevin Faulconer (incumbent)	181,147	57.16
Lori Saldaña	73,932	23.33
Ed Harris	61,458	19.39
Total votes	316,891	100
