= 2016 San Diego mayoral election =

- June 7, 2016
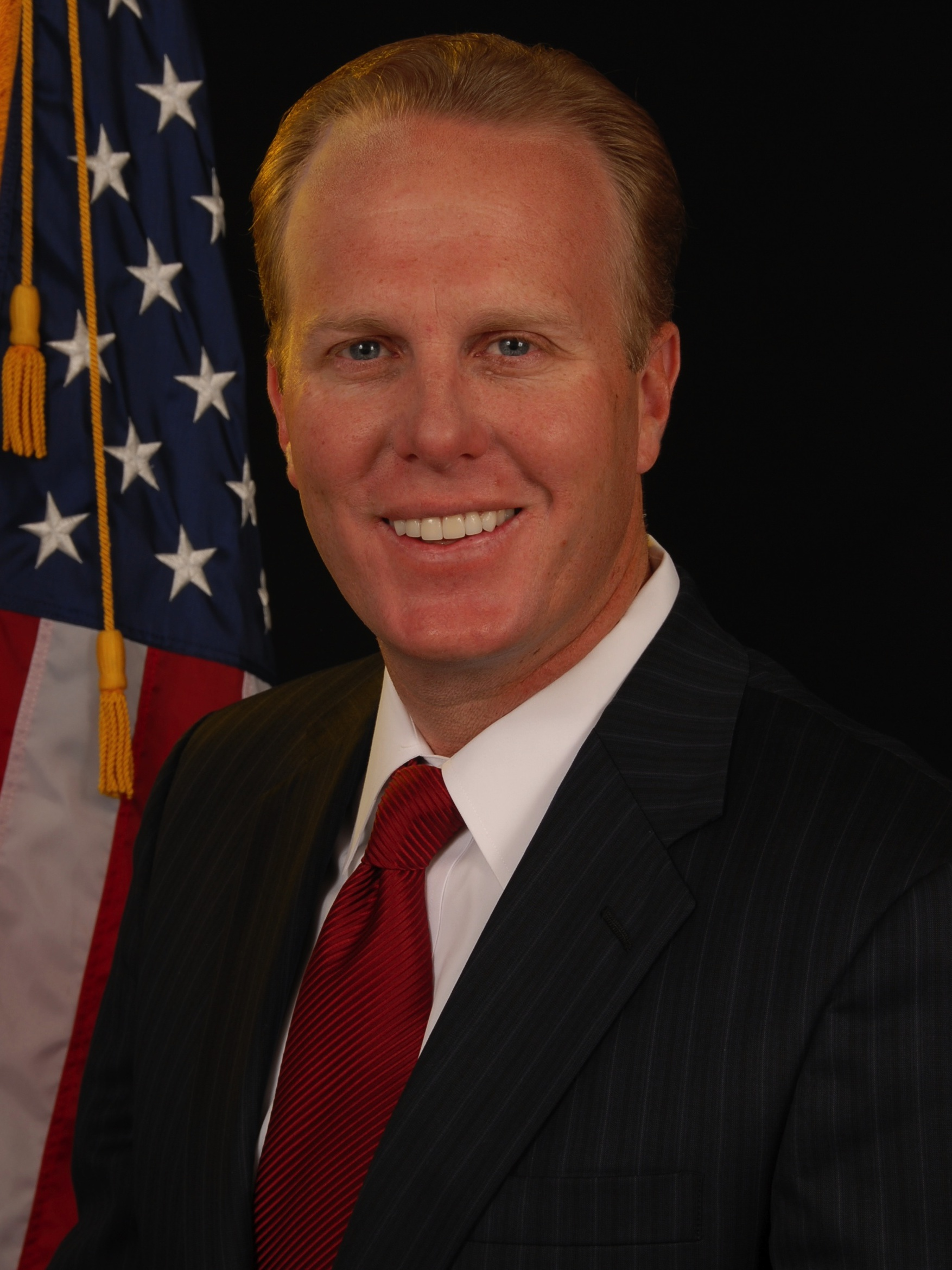

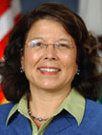

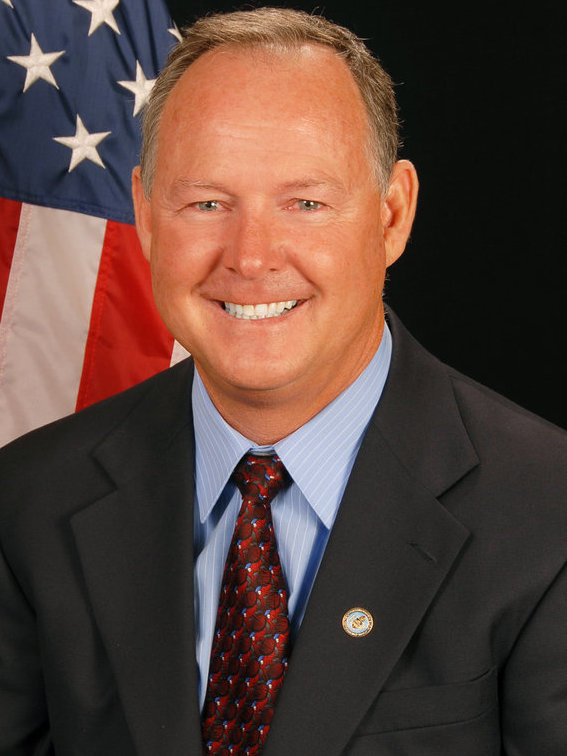
Candidate	Kevin Faulconer	Lori Saldaña	Ed Harris
Party	Republican	Independent	Democratic
Popular vote	181,147	73,932	61,458
Percentage	57.2%	23.3%	19.4%
- Results by city council district Faulconer: 40–50% 50–60% 60–70% 70–80%
Mayor before election
Kevin Faulconer
Republican
Elected Mayor
Kevin Faulconer
Republican

The 2016 San Diego mayoral election was held on Tuesday, June 7, 2016, to elect the mayor of San Diego. Incumbent Kevin Faulconer ran for a second term as mayor against former San Diego City Council member Ed Harris and former California State Assembly member Lori Saldaña.

Municipal elections in California are officially non-partisan, though some candidates do receive funding and support from various political parties. The non-partisan primary was held Tuesday, June 7, 2016. Faulconer received a majority of votes in the general election, precluding the need for a November runoff.

== Candidates ==
=== Qualified ===
- Kevin Faulconer, incumbent Mayor of San Diego (voter registration: Republican)
- Ed Harris, former San Diego City Council member (voter registration: Democrat)
- Lori Saldaña, former California State Assembly member (voter registration: no party preference)

== Campaign ==
In October 2015, Ocean Beach Town Council president Gretchen Newsom became the first major Democratic candidate to announce that she would challenge Kevin Faulconer's bid for re-election. However, Newsom dropped out of the race only seven weeks after declaring her candidacy.

In January 2016, former California State Assembly member Lori Saldaña announced that she intended to run for mayor against Faulconer. Although Saldaña had been a Democrat while in the state assembly, she subsequently left the party in September 2014 and intended to run for mayor as an independent.

In March 2016, former San Diego City Council member Ed Harris declared his intention to run for mayor.

== General election ==
The general election was held on Tuesday, June 7, 2016.

=== Results ===
2016 San Diego mayoral election
Party	Candidate	Votes	%
Republican	Kevin Faulconer (incumbent)	181,147	57.2%
Independent	Lori Saldaña	73,932	23.3%
Democratic	Ed Harris	61,458	19.4%
Total votes		316,537	100.0%
