= California Legislative LGBTQ Caucus =

Caucus in the California State Assembly

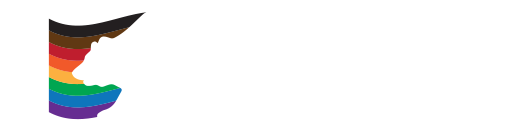
- Chair: Chris Ward
- Founded: 2002; 24 years ago
- Seats in the State Senate: 7 / 40
- Seats in the State Assembly: 7 / 80

The California Legislative LGBTQ Caucus (formerly the California Legislative LGBT Caucus) is an American political organization formed in June 2002 and composed of openly lesbian, gay, bisexual and transgender members of the California State Legislature. The caucus currently has 14 members, a record high.

This group is contrasted to other LGBT Equality Caucuses in that the California caucus consists entirely of LGBT legislators while other LGBT Equality Caucuses consist of all orientations. Both, however, promote the promulgation of LGBT-affirming laws within the legislature.

== Role ==
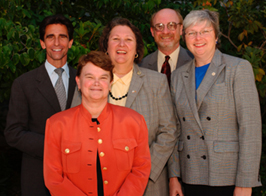
Founding members of the Caucus (left to right): Mark Leno, Sheila Kuehl, Jackie Goldberg, John Laird, Christine Kehoe

The caucus was established to champion legislation that advances equality and the rights of LGBT Californians. Its members have introduced and passed numerous measures related to gay rights, including two same-sex marriage bills (both vetoed by the governor), bills prohibiting discrimination in state government, tackling orientation-based bullying in schools and adequately funding HIV/AIDS treatment. In December 2008, in the wake of the passage of Proposition 8, members of the LGBTQ Caucus pushed a resolution expressing the legislature's opinion that the proposition was unconstitutional.

In addition, the caucus sponsors an annual LGBT Pride Exhibit every June and presents the LGBT Pride Recognition Awards to outstanding Californians. In 2006, several Republican legislators boycotted the awards ceremony, walking off the Assembly floor as the awards were presented. This boycott stalled the ceremony for several years until 2009 when it was resurrected. In each year since, many Republicans have boycotted the ceremony.

== Feature in a documentary ==
A 2016 documentary film, Political Animals, by Jonah Markowitz features the accomplishments of California legislators Carole Migden, Sheila Kuehl, Jackie Goldberg, and Christine Kehoe.

== Members ==
27 openly LGBT people have served in the legislature and been members of the caucus – all gay or lesbian and Democrats. 13 of them are current office holders.

In addition, there have been two gay members of the legislature who, despite being open about their sexual orientation, were not members of the caucus. Republican state senator Roy Ashburn from Kern County came out in March 2010 after having been arrested while driving under the influence on his way home from a gay bar. He served the remaining eight months of his term but did not join the caucus. Republican Assemblymember Carl DeMaio, also openly gay, did not join the caucus after being elected in 2024.

There have also been members of the legislature who, though not open about their sexuality at the time they served in public office, subsequently declared themselves gay or lesbian. Dennis Mangers, who represented Orange County in the Assembly from 1976 to 1980, married his partner of 17 years, Michael Sestak, in June 2008. Art Torres, who served 8 years in the Assembly and 12 in the State Senate before going on to spend 13 years as chair of the California Democratic Party, came out publicly in April 2009.

=== Current members ===
Name	Residence	Party	Years in Assembly	Years in Senate
John Laird	Santa Cruz	Democratic	2002—2008	2020—present
Sabrina Cervantes	Eastvale	Democratic	2016—2024	2024—present
Scott Wiener	San Francisco	Democratic	—	2016—present
Chris Ward	San Diego	Democratic	2020—present	—
Alex Lee	San Jose	Democratic	2020–present	—
Corey Jackson	Perris	Democratic	2022–present	—
Rick Chavez Zbur	West Hollywood	Democratic	2022—present	—
Caroline Menjivar	San Fernando Valley	Democratic	—	2022—present
Steve Padilla	Chula Vista	Democratic	—	2022—present
Sasha Renée Pérez	Pasadena	Democratic	—	2024—present
Jose Solache	Lynwood, California	Democratic	2024—present	—
Mark González	Los Angeles	Democratic	2024—present	—
Sade Elhawary	South Los Angeles	Democratic	2024—present	—
Christopher Cabaldon	Davis	Democratic	—	2024—present

=== Former members ===
Name	Residence	Party	Years in Assembly	Years in Senate
Sheila Kuehl	Santa Monica	Democratic	1994–2000	2000–2008
Carole Migden	San Francisco	Democratic	1996–2002	2004–2008
Christine Kehoe	San Diego	Democratic	2000–2004	2004–2012
Jackie Goldberg	Los Angeles	Democratic	2000–2006	—
Tom Ammiano	San Francisco	Democratic	2008–2014	—
John Pérez	Los Angeles	Democratic	2008–2014	—
Mark Leno	San Francisco	Democratic	2002–2008	2008–2016
Rich Gordon	Menlo Park	Democratic	2010–2016	—
Ricardo Lara	Bell Gardens	Democratic	2010–2012	2012–2019
Cathleen Galgiani	Livingston	Democratic	2006–2012 (Note: Galgiani came out in November 2011)	2012–2020
Todd Gloria	San Diego	Democratic	2016–2020	—
Toni Atkins	San Diego	Democratic	2010–2016	2016–2024
Susan Eggman	Stockton	Democratic	2012–2020	2020–2024
Evan Low	Campbell	Democratic	2014–2024	—

=== Chronology of openly LGBT legislators ===
The table below shows members of the legislature who were openly LGBT at the time they served. It extends back to the election of the first openly gay member of the California legislature: Sheila Kuehl (elected November 1994). The caucus was founded in 2002.

Legislative session																Openly LGBT members (in Assembly, in Senate)
1995–1996	Sheila Kuehl; Assembly, 41st district															1 (1, 0)
1997–1998	Sheila Kuehl; Assembly, 41st district	Carole Migden; Assembly, 13th district														2 (2, 0)
1999–2000	Sheila Kuehl; Assembly, 41st district	Carole Migden; Assembly, 13th district														2 (2, 0)
2001–2002	Sheila Kuehl; Senate, 23rd district	Carole Migden; Assembly, 13th district	Christine Kehoe; Assembly, 76th district	Jackie Goldberg; Assembly, 45th district												4 (3, 1)
2003–2004	Sheila Kuehl; Senate, 23rd district		Christine Kehoe; Assembly, 76th district	Jackie Goldberg; Assembly, 45th district	Mark Leno; Assembly, 13th district	John Laird; Assembly, 27th district										5 (4, 1)
2005–2006	Sheila Kuehl; Senate, 23rd district	Carole Migden; Senate, 3rd district	Christine Kehoe; Senate, 39th district	Jackie Goldberg; Assembly, 45th district	Mark Leno; Assembly, 13th district	John Laird; Assembly, 27th district										6 (3, 3)
2007–2008	Sheila Kuehl; Senate, 23rd district	Carole Migden; Senate, 3rd district	Christine Kehoe; Senate, 39th district		Mark Leno; Assembly, 13th district	John Laird; Assembly, 27th district										5 (2, 3)
2009–2010	John Pérez; Assembly, 46th district	Tom Ammiano; Assembly, 13th district	Christine Kehoe; Senate, 39th district	Roy Ashburn; Senate, 18th district	Mark Leno; Senate, 3rd district											5 (2, 3)
2011–2012	John Pérez; Assembly, 46th district	Tom Ammiano; Assembly, 13th district	Christine Kehoe; Senate, 39th district	Ricardo Lara; Assembly, 50th district	Mark Leno; Senate, 3rd district	Rich Gordon; Assembly, 21st district	Toni Atkins; Assembly, 76th district	Cathleen Galgiani; Assembly, 17th district								8 (6, 2)
2013–2014	John Pérez; Assembly, 46th district	Tom Ammiano; Assembly, 13th district	Susan Eggman; Assembly, 13th district	Ricardo Lara; Senate, 33rd district	Mark Leno; Senate, 3rd district	Rich Gordon; Assembly, 21st district	Toni Atkins; Assembly, 76th district	Cathleen Galgiani; Senate, 5th district								8 (5, 3)
2015–2016	Evan Low; Assembly, 28th district		Susan Eggman; Assembly, 13th district	Ricardo Lara; Senate, 33rd district	Mark Leno; Senate, 3rd district	Rich Gordon; Assembly, 21st district	Toni Atkins; Assembly, 76th district	Cathleen Galgiani; Senate, 5th district								7 (4, 3)
2017–2018	Evan Low; Assembly, 28th district	Sabrina Cervantes; Assembly, 60th district	Susan Eggman; Assembly, 13th district	Ricardo Lara; Senate, 33rd district	Scott Wiener; Senate, 11th district	Todd Gloria; Assembly, 78th district	Toni Atkins; Senate, 39th district	Cathleen Galgiani; Senate, 5th district								8 (4, 4)
2019–2020	Evan Low; Assembly, 28th district	Sabrina Cervantes; Assembly, 60th district	Susan Eggman; Assembly, 13th district		Scott Wiener; Senate, 11th district	Todd Gloria; Assembly, 78th district	Toni Atkins; Senate, 39th district	Cathleen Galgiani; Senate, 5th district								7 (4, 3)
2021–2022	Evan Low; Assembly, 28th district	Sabrina Cervantes; Assembly, 60th district	Susan Eggman; Senate, 5th district	Chris Ward; Assembly, 78th district	Scott Wiener; Senate, 11th district	John Laird; Senate, 17th district	Toni Atkins; Senate, 39th district	Alex Lee; Assembly, 25th district								8 (4, 4)
2023–2024	Evan Low; Assembly, 28th district	Sabrina Cervantes; Assembly, 60th district	Susan Eggman; Senate, 5th district	Chris Ward; Assembly, 78th district	Scott Wiener; Senate, 11th district	John Laird; Senate, 17th district	Toni Atkins; Senate, 39th district	Alex Lee; Assembly, 25th district	Corey Jackson; Assembly, 60th district	Rick Zbur; Assembly, 51st district	Caroline Menjivar; Senate, 20th district	Steve Padilla; Senate, 18th district				12 (6, 6)
2025–2026	Christopher Cabaldon; Senate, 3rd district	Sabrina Cervantes; Senate, 31st district	Sasha Renée Pérez; Senate, 25th district	Chris Ward; Assembly, 78th district	Scott Wiener; Senate, 11th district	John Laird; Senate, 17th district	Mark Gonzalez; Assembly, 54th district	Alex Lee; Assembly, 25th district	Corey Jackson; Assembly, 60th district	Rick Zbur; Assembly, 51st district	Caroline Menjivar; Senate, 20th district	Steve Padilla; Senate, 18th district	Sade Elhawary; Assembly, 57th district	Jose Solache; Assembly, 62nd district	Carl DeMaio; Assembly, 75th district	15 (8, 7)
2027–2028	Christopher Cabaldon; Senate, 3rd district	Sabrina Cervantes; Senate, 31st district	Sasha Renée Pérez; Senate, 25th district	Chris Ward; Assembly, 78th district	Clarissa Cervantes; Assembly, 58th district	John Laird; Senate, 17th district	Mark Gonzalez; Assembly, 54th district	Alex Lee; Assembly, 25th district	Corey Jackson; Assembly, 60th district	Rick Zbur; Assembly, 51st district	Caroline Menjivar; Senate, 20th district	Steve Padilla; Senate, 18th district	Sade Elhawary; Assembly, 57th district	Jose Solache; Assembly, 62nd district	Carl DeMaio; Assembly, 75th district	15 (9, 6)

Notes:
1. Roy Ashburn came out in March 2010, having served since 1996 (Assembly, 1996–2002; Senate, 2002–2010). Ashburn did not join the caucus after coming out.
2. Cathleen Galgiani came out in November 2011, having served in the Assembly since 2006.
3. Carl DiMaio did not join the caucus

== Chairs ==
Term of office	Name	Chamber
2002–2003	Christine Kehoe	Assembly
2003–2006	Mark Leno	Assembly
2006–2008	John Laird	Assembly
2008–2010	Mark Leno	Senate
2010–2011	Tom Ammiano	Assembly
2011–2012	Christine Kehoe	Senate
2012–2015	Rich Gordon	Assembly
2015–2017	Susan Eggman	Assembly
2017–2019	Evan Low	Assembly
2019–2022	Scott Wiener	Senate
2022–2024	Susan Eggman	Senate
2024–present	Chris Ward	Assembly
