= Tricia Hunter =

American politician

Member of the California State Assembly from the 76th district
- In office October 10, 1989 - November 30, 1992
- Preceded by: Bill Randolph Bradley
- Succeeded by: Mike Gotch

Personal details
- Born: February 2, 1949 (age 77) North Dakota, U.S.
- Party: Republican

Patricia Rae Hunter (February 2, 1949), known by her nickname Tricia, is a former state legislator in California. She served in the California Assembly. A nurse by profession and a former member of the Registered Nurse Board, she won a special election to the state Assembly in 1989 in a major upset that caught both political parties by surprise. In the Assembly, she became known as an expert in health care and an advocate for the practicing registered nurses. Considered a moderate, she was disliked by conservatives and faced vigorous primary challenges. She was reelected by a comfortable margin in 1990, and in 1991, an attempt was made to recall her but it failed. However, the following year, redistricting dramatically changed the boundaries of her district and she had to run in a different district in 1992. That year, she was narrowly defeated by Democrat Julie Bornstein. After the election, she also worked for the Flannery Group, a lobbying firm. She sought to return to the state Assembly in 1996, but lost a close race to Democrat Howard Wayne, a former state Assistant Attorney General. After her second election loss, she was appointed Special Assistant to the Health and Human Services Agency and to the California Medical Assistance Commission by Governor Pete Wilson. In 2004, she sought to return to the state Assembly again in, but lost the election to Democrat Lori Saldaña.

Hunter is currently a member of the Government Relations Group, a lobbying group that she helped found. She continues to be outspoken on health care issues and do volunteer nursing work.
