= John D. Babbage =

American politician

Member of the California State Assembly from the 76th district
- In office January 3, 1949 – January 5, 1953
- Preceded by: Philip L. Boyd
- Succeeded by: J. Ward Casey

Personal details
- Born: March 28, 1916 New York, U.S.
- Died: April 28, 1990 (aged 74)
- Party: Republican
- Education: University of Southern California; Columbia University

John D. Babbage (March 28, 1916 – April 28, 1990) was an American politician. He served as a Republican member for the 76th district of the California State Assembly.

== Life and career ==
Babbage was born in New York. He attended Miami Military Academy, the University of Southern California and Columbia University.

In 1948, Babbage was elected to represent the 76th district of the California State Assembly, succeeding Philip L. Boyd. He served until 1953, when he was succeeded by J. Ward Casey.

Babbage died on April 28, 1990, at the age of 74.
