= Cornelius Gerrit Hendrik Bennink =

American politician

Cornelius Gerrit Hendrik Bennink (October 27, 1842 – August 10, 1917) was an American politician. He served in the California State Assembly, and represented the 76th district and 78th district. He also served in the Massachusetts House of Representatives.
