= Darshana Patel =

American politician (born 1974)

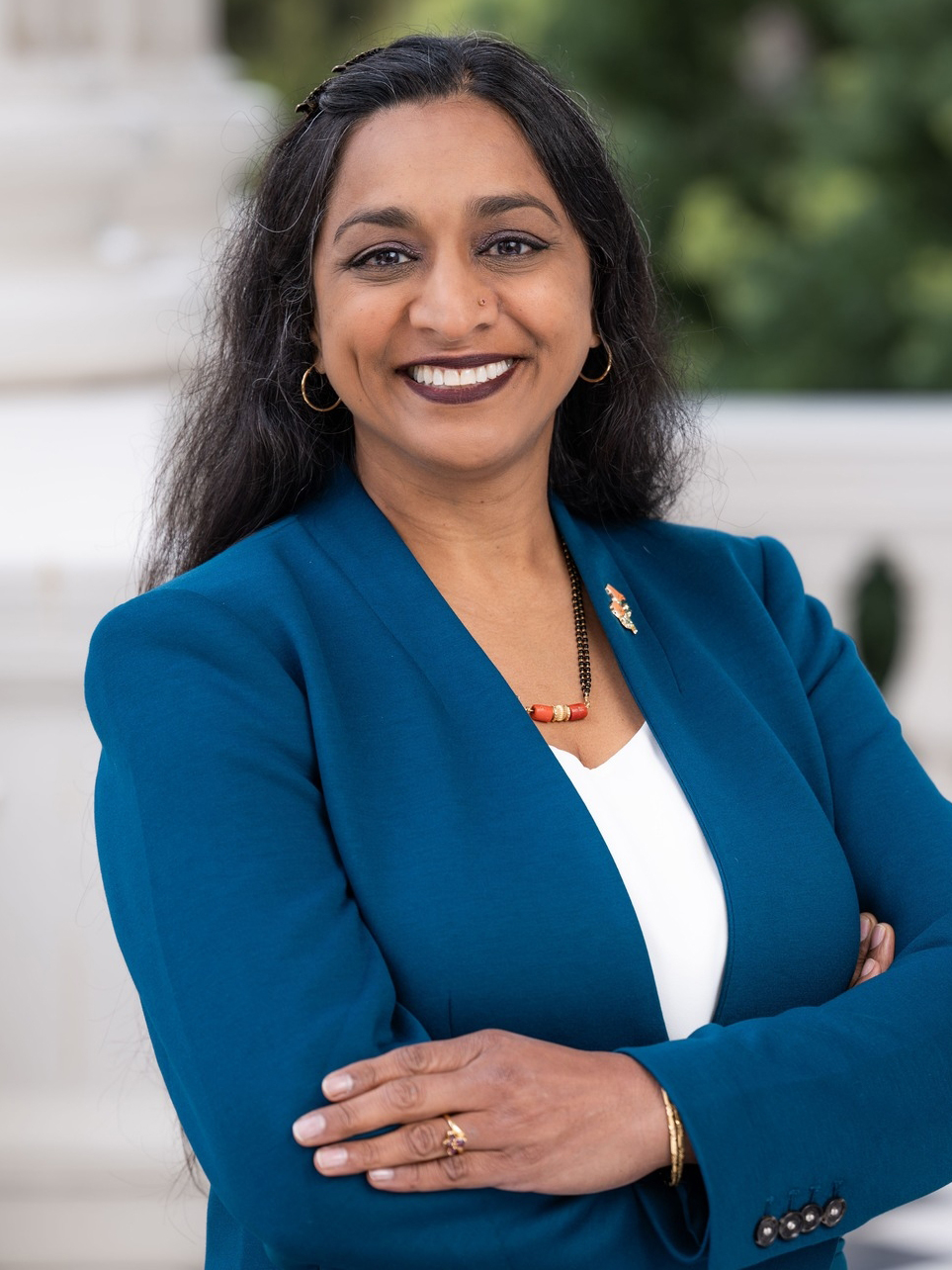
- Official portrait, 2024

Member of the California State Assembly from the 76th district
- Incumbent
- Assumed office December 2, 2024
- Preceded by: Brian Maienschein

Personal details
- Born: 1974 (age 51–52) Pittsburgh, Pennsylvania
- Party: Democratic
- Education: Occidental College(BA); UC Irvine(PhD)
- Website: Campaign website

Academic background
- Thesis: Characterization of membrane binding properties of annexins (1997)

Academic work
- Discipline: Biophysics

Darshana Ramesh Patel (born 1974) is an American scientist and politician serving as a member of the California State Assembly for the 76th district since 2024. A member of the Democratic Party, she previously served as President of the Poway Unified School District and as a commissioner of the California Commission on Asian and Pacific Islander Affairs.

== Early life, education, and career ==
Patel was born in Pittsburgh, Pennsylvania to Gujarati parents from India. She holds a Bachelor of Arts in biochemistry with a minor in religious studies from Occidental College and a Ph.D. in biophysics from University of California, Irvine.

Patel previously worked in oncology research at Genentech, where she researched new methods of cancer treatment and delivering chemotherapy.

== California Assembly ==
Patel was elected to the California State Assembly in 2024, defeating Republican Kristie Bruce-Lane. She is the first Hindu woman to serve in the California State Legislature.

In March 2025, Patel introduced a bill to close a loophole which made threats only illegal if they target specific individuals thus preventing the prosecution of threats made against institutions such as schools, places of worship, or medical facilities. In June, Patel and Ash Kalra's bill to make Diwali a new state public holiday passed the assembly unanimously.

== Personal life ==
Patel lives in the Rancho Peñasquitos neighborhood of San Diego with her husband and three daughters.

== Electoral history ==
2024 California State Assembly 76th district election
Primary election
Party	Candidate	Votes	%
Republican	Kristie Bruce-Lane	49,316	49.5
Democratic	Darshana Patel	34,066	34.2
Democratic	Joseph Rocha	16,312	16.4
Total votes		99,694	100.0
General election
Democratic	Darshana Patel	113,242	54.0
Republican	Kristie Bruce-Lane	96,358	46.0
Total votes		209,600	100.0
Democratic hold			
