= Mike Gotch =

American politician (1947–2008)

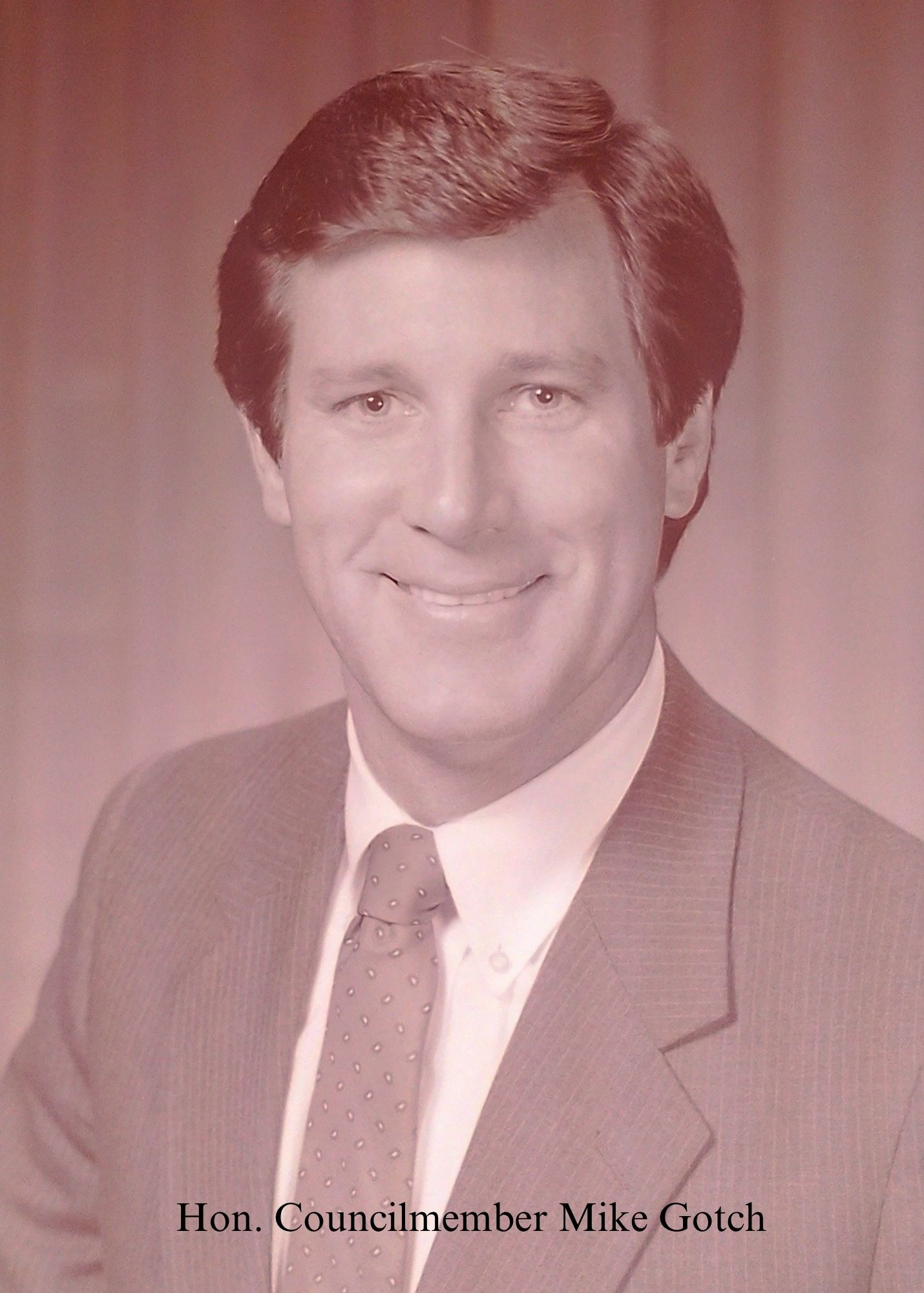

Member of the California State Assembly from the 76th district
- In office December 7, 1992 – November 30, 1994
- Preceded by: Tricia Hunter
- Succeeded by: Susan Davis

Member of the California State Assembly from the 78th district
- In office December 3, 1990 – November 30, 1992
- Preceded by: Jeff Marston
- Succeeded by: Dede Alpert

Member of San Diego City Council representing the Sixth District
- In office 1979–1987

Personal details
- Born: October 4, 1947 San Francisco, California, U.S.
- Died: May 18, 2008 (aged 60) La Jolla, California, U.S.
- Party: Democratic
- Spouse: Janet Lee Clare (m. 1988)
- Education: San Diego State University
- Occupation: Politician

Mike Gotch (October 4, 1947 – May 18, 2008) was an American politician who was a San Diego City Council member, a California state assemblyman, and a state advocate for environmental issues. He is remembered for his representation of the beach area with the dedication of a bridge in his name.

== Early life and education ==
Gotch grew up in San Francisco. He graduated from San Diego State University with a bachelor's degree in public administration.

== Political career ==
Gotch's public career began in the 1970s as president of the Mission Beach Town Council while working as analyst and then director for the San Diego County Local Agency Formation Commission. He was then elected to the San Diego City Council in 1979, representing the Mission Beach and Pacific Beach communities. He was reelected in 1983 with a record 91.4 percent of the vote. His community support, however, fell in 1988 when he pushed through a development project to turn historic Belmont Park, an amusement park that had fallen into disrepair, into an $18-million shopping center, which the council approved.

He was appointed to the Stadium Authority Board from 1988 to 1990 and was instrumental in instituting a smoking ban in the facility. He worked on former senator Gary Hart's short-lived presidential campaign before returning to run for a beach-area Assembly district.

He was elected to the 78th District of the California State Assembly, serving from 1990 to 1992, and then elected to the 76th District from 1992 to 1994. On the city council and in the Assembly, he represented areas that included coastal communities. He retired from the Assembly at the end of his second term. He went to work as a lobbyist for the Tribal Alliance of Northern California.

Gotch returned to Sacramento in 2000 as the legislative liaison for then-governor. Gray Davis until 2003.

== Personal life ==
Gotch married his wife, Janet Clare, in 1988. They bought a home in Yountville in the Napa Valley in 1992. Gotch died of melanoma cancer in 2008.

== Mike Gotch Memorial Bridge ==
In April 2012, the San Diego City Council officially renamed the 260-foot Rose Creek Bikeway and Pedestrian Bridge as the Mike Gotch Memorial Bridge, which now connects a bike and pedestrian path that traverses around Mission Bay. The bridge was dedicated to him at its opening on April 26, 2012.

California Assembly
Preceded by Tricia Hunter	California State Assemblyman, 76th Assembly District; 1992-1994	Succeeded by Susan Davis

California Assembly
Preceded by Jeff Marston	California State Assemblyman, 78th Assembly District; 1990-1992	Succeeded by Dede Alpert
