= John R. Brierly =

American politician

John R. Brierly (died January 6, 1891) was an American politician. He served in the California State Assembly and represented the 76th district.
