= F. N. Marion =

American politician

F. N. Marion was an American politician. He served in the California State Assembly and represented the 76th district.
