= Charles Sumner McKelvey =

American politician

Charles Sumner McKelvey (February 19, 1859 – September 13, 1941) was an American politician. He served as major of the California National Guard. He served in the California State Assembly and represented the 76th district.
