= Christine Kehoe =

American politician (born 1950)

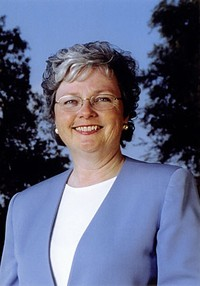

Member of the California Senate from the 39th district
- In office December 6, 2004 – November 30, 2012
- Preceded by: Dede Alpert
- Succeeded by: Marty Block

Member of the California State Assembly from the 76th district
- In office December 4, 2000 – November 30, 2004
- Preceded by: Susan Davis
- Succeeded by: Lori Saldaña

Member of San Diego City Council for the 3rd district
- In office December 6, 1993 – December 4, 2000
- Preceded by: John Hartley
- Succeeded by: Toni Atkins

Personal details
- Born: October 3, 1950 (age 76) Troy, New York, U.S.
- Party: Democratic
- Domestic partner: Julie Warren
- Education: State University of New York, Albany
- Occupation: Legislative aide Newspaper editor

Christine T. Kehoe (born October 3, 1950) is an American politician from San Diego, California. A Democrat, she served from 2004 to 2012 as a member of the California State Senate, representing the 39th district. She was previously a member of the California State Assembly (2000–2004), and of San Diego City Council (1993–2000).

== Early life and activism ==
Kehoe was born in 1950 in Troy, New York. She earned a bachelor's degree from University at Albany, The State University of New York in 1977. She became active in politics in 1978 as a volunteer with the Center for Women's Studies and Services in San Diego. Kehoe was editor of the San Diego Gayzette during 1984–1986, and was San Diego County chair for the campaign to defeat California Proposition 64 (1986) and restore AIDS to the state list of communicable diseases. She was the coordinator of the San Diego AIDS Assistance Fund 1987–1988, executive director of the Hillcrest Business Association 1988–1989, and a city council aide during 1989–1992.

Kehoe, who is a lesbian, is a strong supporter of equal rights for gays and lesbians. A former chair of the California Legislative LGBT Caucus, she was one of five openly LGBT members of the California State Legislature, alongside Senator Mark Leno (D–San Francisco) and Assemblymembers Tom Ammiano (D–San Francisco), Toni Atkins (D-San Diego) and John Pérez (D–Los Angeles).

== City Council ==
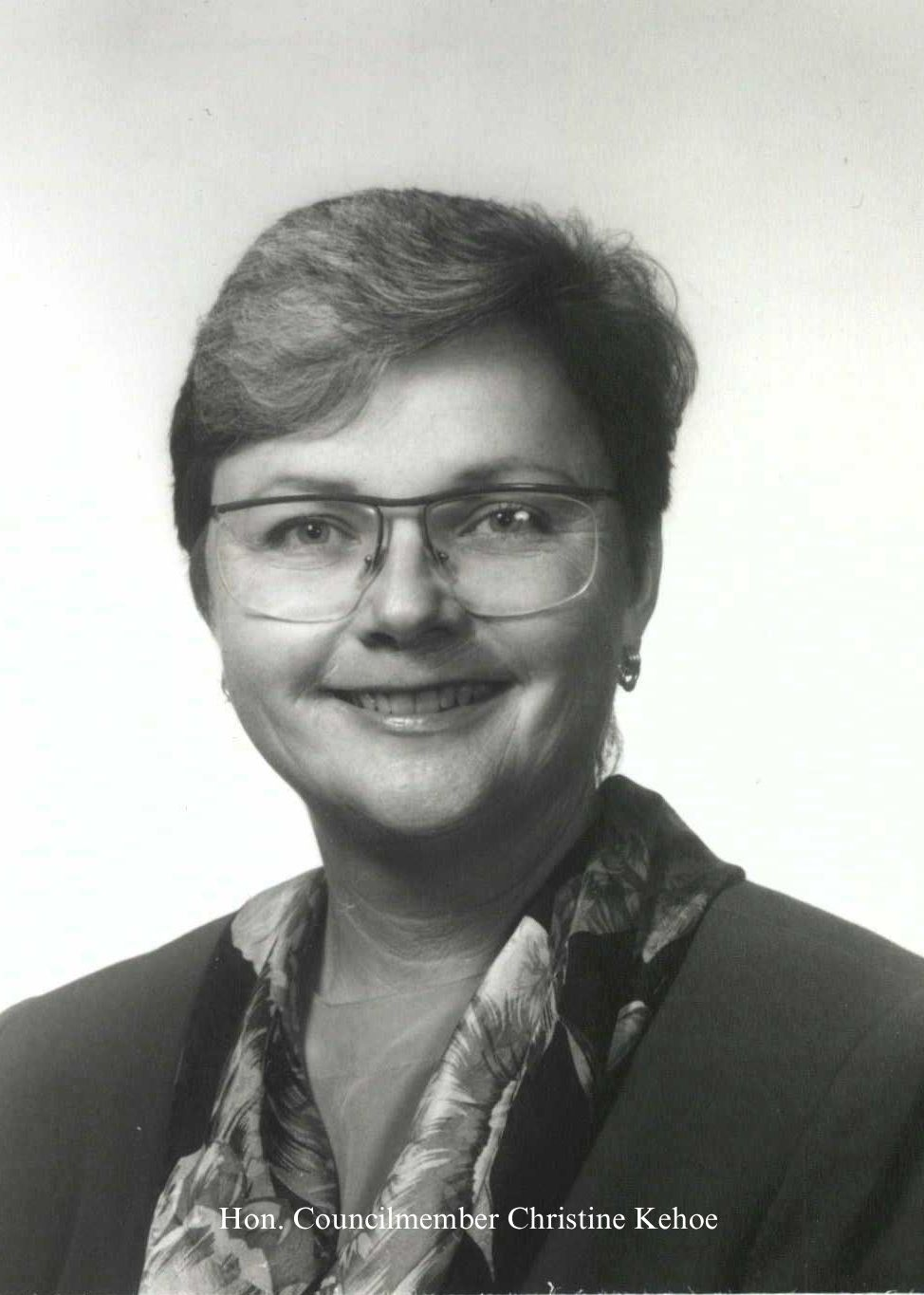
Kehoe as a member of the San Diego City Council

Kehoe represented San Diego's 3rd City Council District from 1993 to 2000, and the 76th District in the California State Assembly from 2000 to 2004. She was the city's first openly gay elected official. In 1998, she ran for the U.S. House of Representatives in the 49th Congressional District against incumbent Congressman Brian Bilbray, but was defeated.

As City Councilmember, she facilitated a decrease in crime in her district by initiating a public/private partnership that built a center housing a library, theater and Head Start classrooms, in addition to other community services. She was also instrumental in the construction of Interstate 15 after multiple delays.

== State Assembly ==
Kehoe was first elected to the California State Assembly in 2000, winning the primary election unopposed and the general election with 61 percent of the vote. She was re-elected without difficulty in 2002.

Kehoe was elected Assembly Speaker pro Tempore, the Assembly's second highest-ranking position. She is the second woman to hold the post.

== State Senate ==
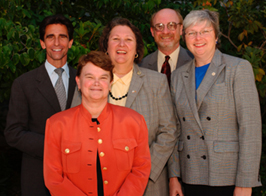
Kehoe in the California Legislative LGBTQ Caucus.

After two terms in the Assembly, Kehoe ran for the California State Senate in 2004 to succeed Dede Alpert in the 39th district. Alpert was termed out in 2004 after eight years in the State Senate.

The district includes the San Diego County communities of City Heights, Clairemont, Del Mar, Emerald Hills, Encanto, Hillcrest, Kearny Mesa, La Jolla, Lemon Grove, Linda Vista, Mira Mesa, Mission Beach, Mission Hills, Mission Valley, Normal Heights, North Park, Ocean Beach, Old Town, Pacific Beach and Valencia Park.

She was re-elected in 2008. She left office in December 2012 due to term limits.

== Post-Senate career ==
In November 2012 she announced that she will become executive director of the California Plug-In Vehicle Collaborative effective January 1, 2013. The collaborative, founded in July 2012, promotes the acceptance and availability of all-electric cars.

In 2016 Kehoe served as one of California's 55 electors in the Electoral College.

== Organizations and memberships ==
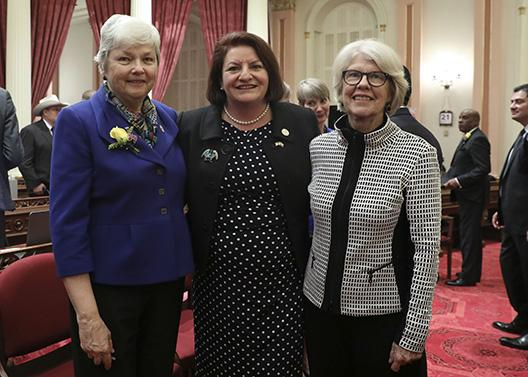
Kehoe with Toni Atkins and Dede Alpert in 2018.

Kehoe has been an ardent supporter of increased environmental protection for the state's resources in her appointed position on the California Coastal Commission. Kehoe is a member of the Sierra Club, the National Organization for Women (NOW), National Women's Political Caucus, Uptown Democratic Club, and California Women in Government, the San Diego Democratic Club, and the Women's Transportation Seminar. She is also a member of the Board of Directors of the California Elected Women's Association for Education and Research (CEWAER).

California Assembly
Preceded by Susan Davis	California State Assemblywoman, 76th Assembly District; December 4, 2000 – November 30, 2004	Succeeded by Lori Saldaña
California Senate
Preceded by Dede Alpert	California State Senator, 39th Senate District; December 6, 2004 – November 30, 2012	Succeeded by Marty Block
