= Cornelius W. Pendleton =

American politician

Corneilus W. Pendleton
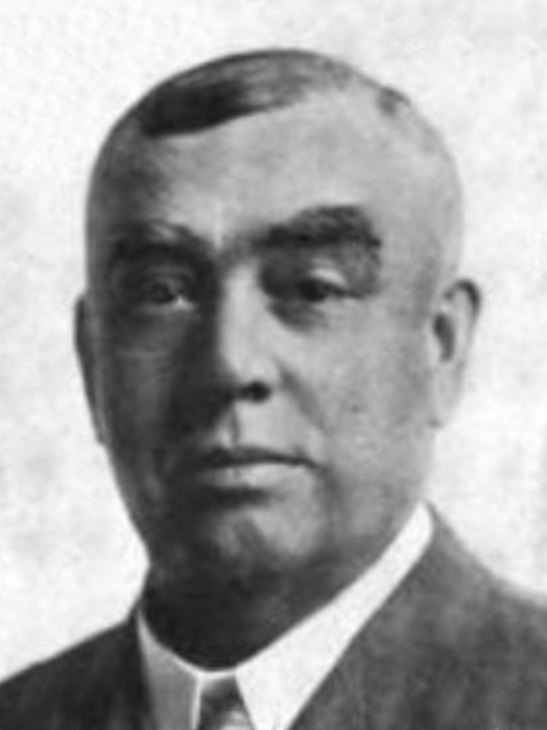
- Pendleton in 1912

Member of the California Senate from the 38th district
- In office January 5, 1903 – January 7, 1907
- Preceded by: Alvan T. Currier
- Succeeded by: H. S. G. McCartney

33rd Speaker of the California State Assembly
- In office January 1901 – March 1901
- Preceded by: Alden Anderson
- Succeeded by: Arthur G. Fisk

Member of the California State Assembly from the 74th district
- In office January 1, 1901 – January 2, 1903
- Preceded by: L. H. Valentine
- Succeeded by: Frederick W. Houser
- In office January 2, 1893 – January 4, 1897
- Preceded by: W. A. Hawley
- Succeeded by: L. H. Valentine

Personal details
- Born: Cornelius Welles Pendleton; January 4, 1859 Brooklyn, New York, U.S.
- Died: September 17, 1936 (age 77) Los Angeles, California, U.S.
- Party: Republican
- Spouse: Elizabeth E. Brower (m. 1886)
- Children: 2
- Education: Brown University

Cornelius Welles Pendleton (January 4, 1859 – September 17, 1936), was a Republican politician from California who served in the California State Assembly, also serving as Speaker of the Assembly and later served in the state Senate.

== Life ==
Cornelius Welles Pendleton was born in 1859 in Brooklyn, and attended Brown University, graduating in 1881. He later studied law and taught school in Salinas, California. He was admitted to the California bar in 1884 and practiced for a year in San Francisco, where he was also married, before moving to Los Angeles.

He was elected to the California State Assembly from the 74th district in 1892 and served as Speaker in 1901. He was elected to the California State Senate in 1902, serving for 2 years. Pendleton was then appointed the U. S. Collector of Customs for the District of Los Angeles in 1906.

In April 1906, Pendleton was staying at the Hotel Vendome in San Jose, California when the earthquake hit, and the wing of the hotel he was staying in collapsed, he survived the event.

Pendleton died on September 17, 1936, in Los Angeles.

Preceded by Alden Anderson	Speaker of the California State Assembly; January 1901 – March 1901	Succeeded by Arthur G. Fisk
