= Tasha Boerner =

American politician (born 1973)

- Official portrait, 2026

Member of the California State Assembly
- Incumbent
- Assumed office December 3, 2018
- Preceded by: Rocky Chávez
- Constituency: 76th district (2018–2022); 77th district (2022–present)

Personal details
- Born: Tasha Nicolle Boerner; February 1, 1973 (age 53) Encinitas, California, U.S.
- Party: Democratic
- Spouse: Istvan (divorced)
- Children: 2
- Education: University of California, Berkeley (BA); Claremont Graduate University (MA)

Tasha Nicolle Boerner (formerly Boerner Horvath; born February 1, 1973) is an American politician serving since 2018 as a member of the California State Assembly. A Democrat, she represents the 77th Assembly district, which encompasses coastal parts of northern San Diego County and the city of San Diego, including Carlsbad, Encinitas, Solana Beach, Del Mar, and the coastal communities of La Jolla south to Downtown and Coronado. Prior to being elected to the State Assembly, she served on the Encinitas City Council.

== Early life and education ==
Boerner earned an Master of Arts in international studies from Claremont Graduate University Institute of Politics and Policy. Part of her graduate work was done at Humboldt University of Berlin, where she met her former husband Istvan. She received her Bachelor of Arts in political science in 1995 from the University of California, Berkeley.

== Political career ==
Boerner was first elected to the State Assembly in November 2018 after defeating fellow Democrat Elizabeth Warren, a freelance journalist not related to the U.S. Senator and former Presidential candidate of the same name. In 2020, she won a second term over former Secret Service Agent Melanie Burkholder. In 2022, Boerner announced her intention to seek election to a third term, this time for the 77th district following redistricting. In 2022, she was opposed in the general election by Republican entrepreneur and investment advisor Dan Downey.

In the 2026 California gubernatorial election, Boerner endorsed Tom Steyer; she had previously endorsed four other candidates who dropped out.

== Electoral history ==
=== Encinitas City Council ===
2018 Encinitas City Council election
Candidate	Votes	%
Tony Kranz	14,511	22.6
Tasha Boerner	14,051	21.9
Mark Muir	13,553	21.1
Phil Graham	11,088	17.3
Tony Brandenburg	10,945	17.0
Total votes	64,148	100.0

=== California State Assembly ===
2018 California State Assembly 76th district election
Primary election
Party	Candidate	Votes	%
Democratic	Elizabeth Warren	28,755	26.2
Democratic	Tasha Boerner	27,566	25.1
Republican	Philip "Phil" Graham	23,155	21.1
Republican	Maureen "Mo" Muir	9,642	8.8
Republican	Thomas E. Krouse	8,675	7.9
Republican	Amanda Rigby	5,919	5.4
Republican	Jerome Stocks	5,119	4.7
Republican	Brian Wimmer	840	0.8
Total votes		109,671	100.0
General election
Democratic	Tasha Boerner	79,769	54.6
Democratic	Elizabeth Warren	66,427	45.4
Total votes		146,196	100.0
Democratic gain from Republican			

2020 California State Assembly 76th district election
Primary election
Party	Candidate	Votes	%
Democratic	Tasha Boerner (incumbent)	77,792	57.5
Republican	Melanie Burkholder	57,391	42.5
Total votes		135,183	100.0
General election
Democratic	Tasha Boerner (incumbent)	132,668	55.6
Republican	Melanie Burkholder	105,855	44.4
Total votes		238,523	100.0
Democratic hold			

2022 California State Assembly 77th district election
Primary election
Party	Candidate	Votes	%
Democratic	Tasha Boerner (incumbent)	78,673	60.9
Republican	Dan Downey	50,530	39.1
Total votes		129,203	100.0
General election
Democratic	Tasha Boerner (incumbent)	121,447	60.4
Republican	Dan Downey	79,637	39.6
Total votes		201,084	100.0
Democratic hold			

2024 California State Assembly 77th district election
Primary election
Party	Candidate	Votes	%
Democratic	Tasha Boerner (incumbent)	72,606	56.9
Republican	James Browne	49,017	38.4
Democratic	Henny Kupferstein	5,977	4.7
Total votes		127,600	100.0
General election
Democratic	Tasha Boerner (incumbent)	154,202	60.4
Republican	James Browne	100,954	39.6
Total votes		255,156	100.0
Democratic hold			
