= Toni Atkins =

American politician (born 1962)

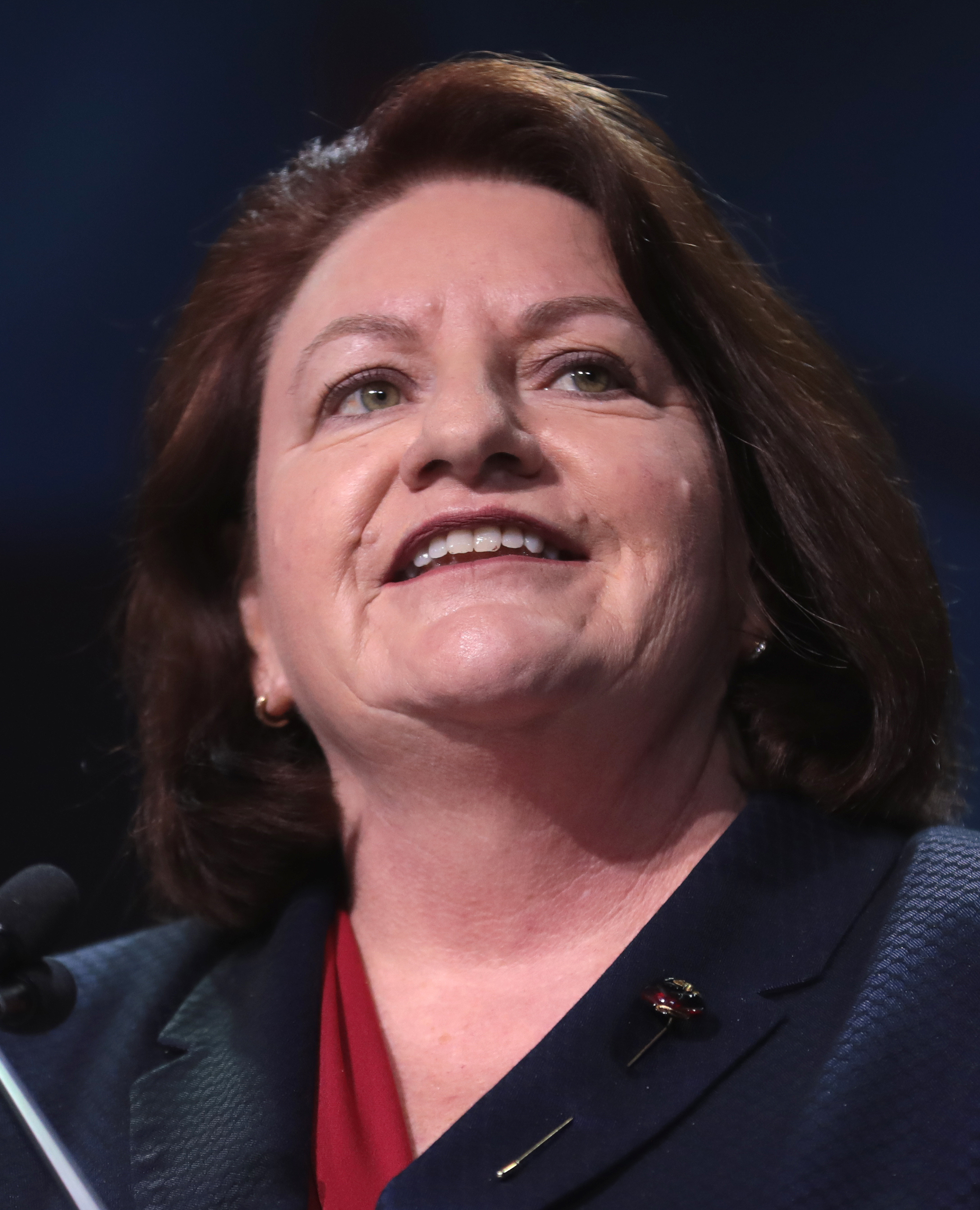
- Atkins speaking in 2019

51st President pro tempore of the California State Senate
- In office March 21, 2018 – February 5, 2024
- Preceded by: Kevin de León
- Succeeded by: Mike McGuire

Member of the California State Senate from the 39th district
- In office December 5, 2016 – December 2, 2024
- Preceded by: Marty Block
- Succeeded by: Akilah Weber

69th Speaker of the California State Assembly
- In office May 12, 2014 – March 7, 2016
- Preceded by: John Pérez
- Succeeded by: Anthony Rendon

Majority Leader of the California Assembly
- In office September 1, 2012 – May 12, 2014
- Preceded by: Charles Calderon
- Succeeded by: Manuel Perez

Member of the California State Assembly
- In office December 6, 2010 – November 30, 2016
- Preceded by: Lori Saldaña
- Succeeded by: Todd Gloria
- Constituency: 76th district (2010–2012); 78th district (2012–2016)

Mayor of San Diego
- In office July 18, 2005 – December 5, 2005; Acting
- Preceded by: Michael Zucchet (acting)
- Succeeded by: Jerry Sanders

Member of San Diego City Council from the 3rd district
- In office December 4, 2000 – December 8, 2008
- Preceded by: Christine Kehoe
- Succeeded by: Todd Gloria

Personal details
- Born: Toni Gayle Atkins; August 1, 1962 (age 63) Wythe County, Virginia, U.S.
- Party: Democratic
- Spouse: Jennifer LeSar
- Education: Emory and Henry College (BA)

Toni Gayle Atkins (born August 1, 1962) is an American politician who served as the 51st president pro tempore of the California State Senate from 2018 to 2024. A member of the Democratic Party, she previously served as the 69th speaker of the California State Assembly from 2014 to 2016 and the California State Assembly majority leader from 2012 to 2014. She represented the 39th State Senate district from 2016 to 2024, encompassing most of San Diego.

Upon her election as speaker of the State Assembly, she became the third woman and first acknowledged lesbian to be elected to the position, as well as the first lawmaker from San Diego holding the office. She served on the San Diego City Council from 2000 to 2008, including a term as acting mayor of San Diego in 2005. She also served as acting governor of California for nine hours on July 30, 2014, which made her California's "first openly gay governor" and again on July 6, 2023, where she became the first openly LGBT person to sign a bill into law in the state. In 2018, she was elected as State Senate president pro tempore, becoming the first woman and the first openly LGBT person to lead the California State Senate, and the first woman and LGBT person to lead both chambers of the state legislature. On January 19, 2024, she launched her campaign for governor in the 2026 election. In September 2025, she suspended her campaign for governor.

== Early life and education ==
Atkins spent her early years in Max Meadows, Virginia, moving to Roanoke at the age of seven. Her father was a miner and her mother a seamstress; she grew up in a home with no running water. She graduated from Emory & Henry College in 1984 and earned a BA in political science, focusing on community organizing. In 2004, Atkins completed Harvard University's John F. Kennedy School of Government program for Senior Executives in State and Local Government as a David Bohnett LGBTQ Victory Institute Leadership Fellow. Atkins relocated to San Diego in 1985.

== San Diego City Council ==
When she first came to San Diego, she joined the staff of Womancare Health Center as Director of Clinic Services. She then served for a number of years as council representative and policy analyst to City Councilmember Christine Kehoe. When Kehoe was elected to the state legislature, Atkins was elected to Kehoe's City Council seat on November 7, 2000. She was reelected in March 2004, without the need for a November runoff.

In April 2005 Mayor Dick Murphy resigned after criticism of his handling of the city's fiscal problems. Councilmember Michael Zucchet, who was deputy mayor, took over, but three days later, resigned along with Councilmember Ralph Inzunza after they were convicted of wire fraud and Hobbs Act violations. In an emergency vote on July 19, Atkins was chosen by the other five council members to take over as mayor pro-tem for one week. On July 25 they reaffirmed their choice and designated Atkins deputy mayor to serve until Jerry Sanders was sworn in as mayor on December 5. Atkins was the first openly lesbian mayor of San Diego.

While on the council, she represented the City of San Diego at the San Diego Chapter of the League of Cities as well as on the board and executive committee of the San Diego Metropolitan Transit System. She sat on the San Diego Association of Governments (SANDAG) Regional Housing Working Group, as an alternate to the Transportation Committee and the Regional Planning Committee, and the City/County Joint Homeless Task Force. She continues to serve on the San Diego River Conservancy as an appointee of former California State Assembly Speaker Herb Wesson. She lists among her priorities affordable housing, workers' rights, neighborhood revitalization and redevelopment of San Diego's older urban neighborhoods.

== State legislature ==
=== State Assembly ===
She was elected to the State Assembly in November 2010, receiving 57.7% of the vote. She represented the 76th Assembly district. In November 2012 she ran in the 78th Assembly district due to redistricting, and won with 62% of the vote.

In 2012 she introduced AB 1522, a bill to prevent the granting of financial support and other spousal rights to abusive spouses. The bill was inspired by the case of a San Diego woman who was ordered to pay legal fees and spousal support to her ex-husband even though he was in prison for abusing her.

In 2012, she was the Majority Leader of the California State Assembly; in January 2014 she was chosen by the Democratic Caucus to take over as Speaker of the Assembly later in the year, replacing termed-out speaker John Pérez. She was the first Speaker of the Assembly from San Diego, the first lesbian to hold the position, and the third woman to do so. Atkins was reelected as Speaker by the Democratic caucus in November 2014. As Speaker she helped to write and secure passage for a $7.5-billion water bond that was approved by the legislature and the voters in 2014. Atkins faced protest over her vote for legislation that would limit community choice aggregation. Atkins stepped down as Assembly speaker in March 2016.

==== 2014 California State Assembly election ====
California's 78th State Assembly district election, 2014
Primary election
Party	Candidate	Votes	%
Democratic	Toni Atkins (incumbent)	45,922	60.2
Republican	Barbara Decker	21,545	28.2
Republican	Kevin D. Melton	8,855	11.6
Total votes		76,322	100.0
General election
Democratic	Toni Atkins (incumbent)	72,224	61.6
Republican	Barbara Decker	45,088	38.4
Total votes		117,312	100.0
Democratic hold			

=== State Senate ===
She ran as candidate for the California's 39th State Senate district in 2016, initially challenging the incumbent Marty Block, also a Democrat, before Block bowed out. In the general election, she defeated Republican John Renison with 63% of the vote.

In 2018, Atkins succeeded Kevin de León as State Senate President pro tempore. This made her the first woman and the first openly LGBT person to lead the California State Senate. She is the third person to serve as both Speaker of the Assembly and President pro tempore of the Senate, after Ransom Burnell and James T. Farley.

==== Housing legislation ====
In May 2019, Senate Appropriations Committee Chair Anthony Portantino blocked Senate Bill 50 from leaving committee and entering the Senate for debate and voting. The bill proposed major reforms to address the California housing shortage by reducing local control (such as requiring the permitting of more apartment construction near public transit and in suburbs with high-paying jobs). Atkins refused to step in and take the bill out of committee, which was within her powers. Proponents of the bill accused Portantino of abusing his powers to deny SB50 a debate and a vote in the Senate. Atkins' action stopped legislators from bringing the bill back for consideration that year. Due to this delay, the bill could not be considered by the Senate until 2020.

In January 2020, when the bill was being reconsidered, Atkins exercised her parliamentary powers to move the bill out of Portantino's committee. The bill made it to the senate floor and was subsequently defeated after multiple floor votes.

==== Climate legislation ====
Atkins has faced criticism for accepting donations from fossil fuel corporations and failing to pass major climate legislation. In particular, critics noted that she appointed opponents of climate action to committees on which they would have an outsized impact on climate legislation.

== Personal life ==
Atkins is one of eight members of the California Legislative LGBT Caucus. She lives in the South Park neighborhood of San Diego with her spouse, Jennifer LeSar.

== See also ==
- List of female speakers of legislatures in the United States

California Assembly
Preceded by Charles Calderon	Majority Leader of the California Assembly; 2012–2014	Succeeded by Manuel Perez
Political offices
Preceded by John Pérez	Speaker of the California Assembly; 2014–2016	Succeeded by Anthony Rendon
California Senate
Preceded by Kevin de León	President pro tempore of the California State Senate; 2018–2024	Succeeded by Mike McGuire
