= Susan Davis (politician) =

American politician (born 1944)

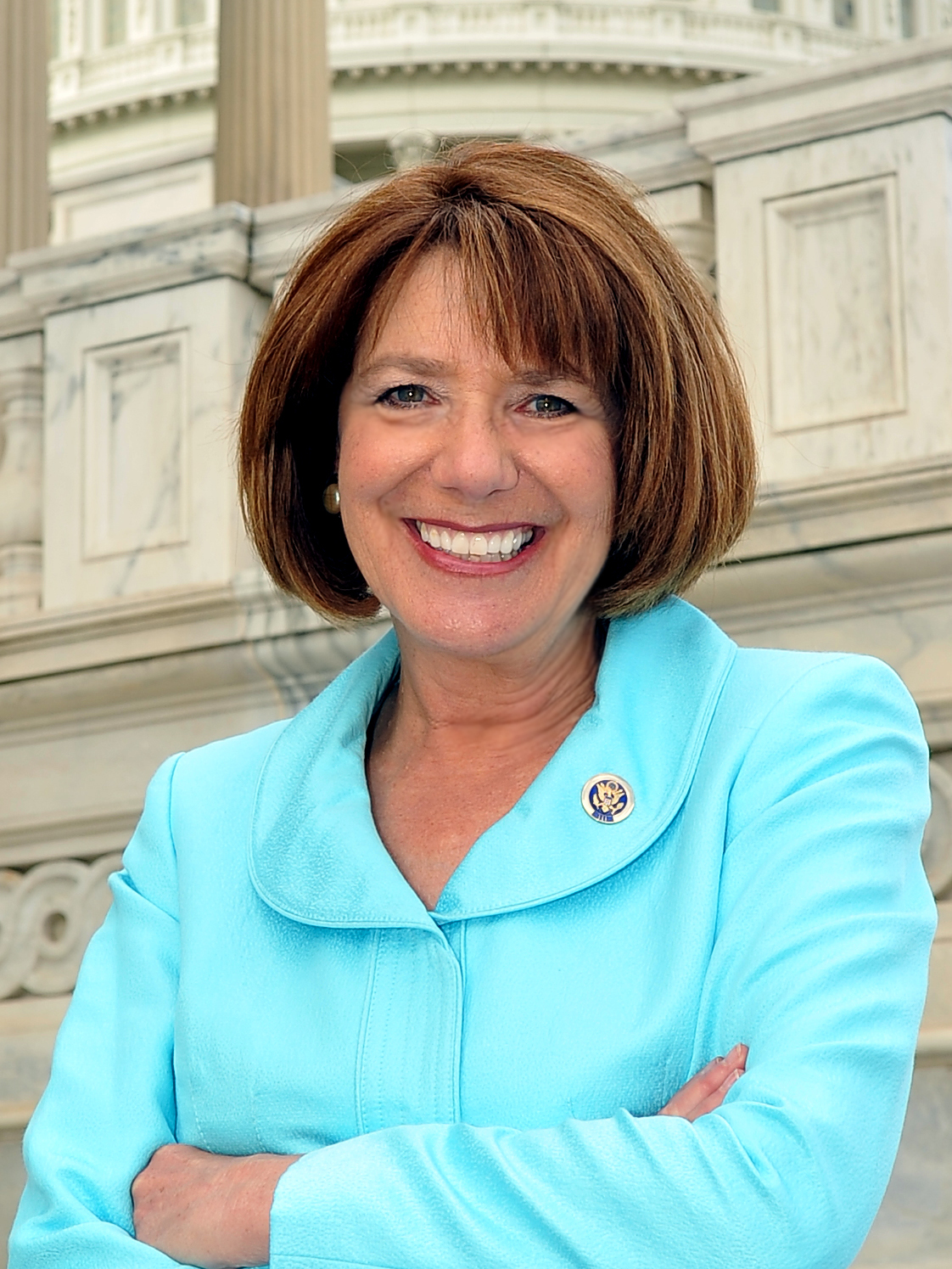

Member of the U.S. House of Representatives from California
- In office January 3, 2001 – January 3, 2021
- Preceded by: Brian Bilbray
- Succeeded by: Sara Jacobs
- Constituency: 49th district (2001–2003); 53rd district (2003–2021)

Member of the California State Assembly from the 76th district
- In office December 5, 1994 – November 30, 2000
- Preceded by: Mike Gotch
- Succeeded by: Christine Kehoe

Personal details
- Born: Susan Carol Alpert; April 13, 1944 (age 82) Cambridge, Massachusetts, U.S.
- Party: Democratic
- Spouse: Steven Davis (m. 1972)
- Education: University of California, Berkeley (BA); University of North Carolina, Chapel Hill (MSW)

Susan Carol Davis (née Alpert; born April 13, 1944) is a former American politician who served as the U.S. representative for California's 49th congressional district for one term and California's 53rd congressional district for nine terms from 2003 to 2021. She is a member of the Democratic Party.

Her district included central and eastern portions of the city of San Diego, as well as eastern suburbs such as El Cajon, La Mesa, Spring Valley, and Lemon Grove.

== Early life, education, and career ==
Davis was born in Cambridge, Massachusetts. She has spent most of her life in California. She graduated with a Bachelor of Arts degree from the University of California, Berkeley, where she was a member of Delta Phi Epsilon sorority. She earned a master's degree in social work from the University of North Carolina at Chapel Hill. Her husband Steve Davis was a doctor in the U.S. Air Force during the Vietnam War. After returning to California, she became a social worker in San Diego.

== Early political career ==
Davis became active in politics through her membership in the local branch of the League of Women Voters, of which she became president in 1977. She was elected to the board of San Diego Unified School District in 1983. She served there until 1992, including two years as president of the body.

In 1994, she was elected to the California State Assembly, and was reelected in 1996 and 1998. In the Assembly, Davis chaired the Committee on Consumer Protection, Government Efficiency and Economic Development. She authored a state law giving women direct access to their OB/Gyn doctors without requiring a referral from their primary care physicians. Other legislation she authored established the right of a patient to obtain a second medical opinion and allowed frail senior citizens to remain in their homes while receiving state-funded nursing care. She introduced laws to reward high-achieving teachers and to establish after-school programs at public schools.

== U.S. House of Representatives ==
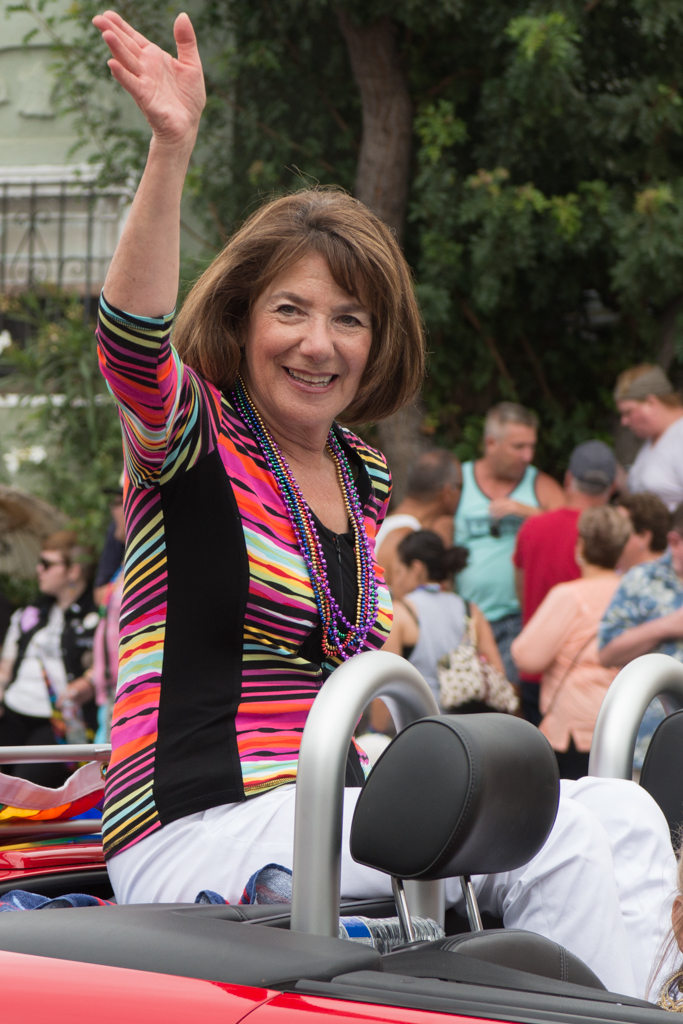
Susan Davis marching in the 2014 San Diego LGBT Pride Parade

In 2000, Davis challenged three-term Republican incumbent Brian Bilbray in what was then the 49th district, winning with 50 percent of the vote. Her district was renumbered the 53rd district after the 2000 census redistricting and made somewhat more Democratic than its predecessor. Following the redistricting, she was reelected eight times without much difficulty. She is the first Democrat to represent what is now the 53rd district for more than one term in over half a century. The only other Democrat to represent this district since the Harry Truman administration, Lynn Schenk, was toppled by Bilbray in the 1994 Republican wave.

Davis introduced a federal version of the California OB/Gyn law she authored at the start of every Congress from 2001 to 2009. Provisions of her OB/Gyn bill were included in the health care reform bill enacted into law.

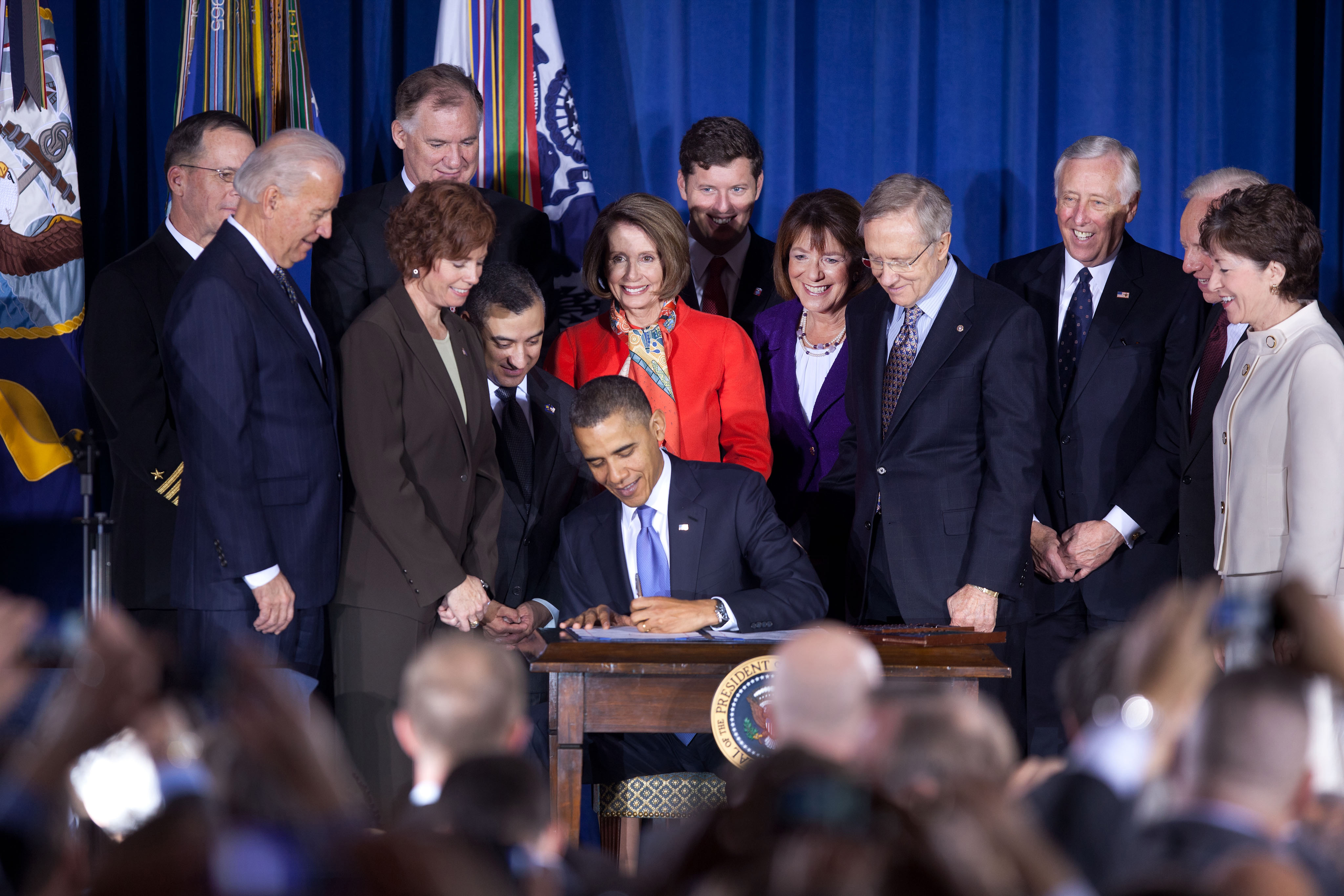
Susan Davis stands behind President Barack Obama as his signs the repeal of Don't Ask Don't Tell

In 2011, Davis voted for the National Defense Authorization Act for Fiscal Year 2012 as part of a controversial provision that allows the government and the military to indefinitely detain American citizens and others without trial.

Davis was a member of the New Democrat Coalition and she portrayed herself as someone who was willing to work across party lines. She served on the House Armed Services Committee. She also served on the Education and Workforce Committee, where she was the Ranking Member of the Subcommittee on Higher Education and Workforce Development.

In 2012, Davis filed a lawsuit to recover over $150,000 in campaign funds from her former campaign treasurer, Kinde Durkee. Durkee was later sentenced to eight years in prison for fraud after pleading guilty to stealing seven million dollars from more than fifty people.

On September 4, 2019, Davis announced that she would not seek re-election in 2020.

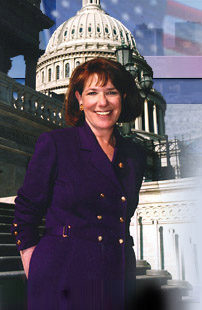
Earlier photo of Davis

=== Committee assignments ===
- Committee on Education and the Workforce
  - Subcommittee on Higher Education and Workforce Development (Chair)
  - Subcommittee on Early Childhood, Elementary and Secondary Education
- Committee on Armed Services
  - Subcommittee on Strategic Forces
  - Subcommittee on Seapower and Projection Forces
- Committee on House Administration

=== Caucus memberships ===
- Congressional Arts Caucus
- Congressional Friends of Animals Caucus
- Congressional Mental Health Caucus
- House Mentoring Caucus (Co-Chair)
- United States Congressional International Conservation Caucus
- Pro-Choice Caucus
- Congressional COPD Caucus
- Congressional EOD Caucus (Co-Chair)
- Veterinary Medicine Caucus
- Congressional Navy-Marine Corps Caucus (Co-Founder)
- Afterschool Caucuses
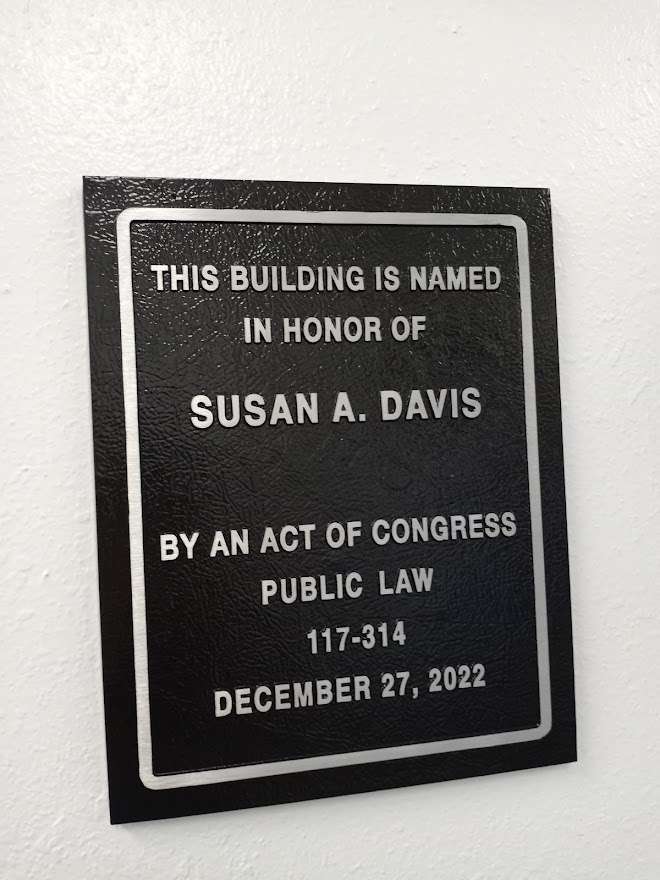
- Congressional Asian Pacific American Caucus
- U.S.-Japan Caucus

=== Legacy ===
Davis was inducted into the San Diego Women's Hall of Fame in 2020. On November 29, 2022, the House passed a bill to name a post office on El Cajon Boulevard in Rolando, San Diego after Davis. President Joe Biden signed the bill into law on December 27, 2022. On July 7, 2023, a ceremony was held to rename the former Andrew Jackson Post Office in Rolando after Davis.

== See also ==
- List of Jewish members of the United States Congress
- Women in the United States House of Representatives

U.S. House of Representatives
| Preceded by Brian Bilbray | Member of the U.S. House of Representatives from California's 49th congressional district 2001–2003 | Succeeded by Darrell Issa |
| New constituency | Member of the U.S. House of Representatives from California's 53rd congressional district 2003–2021 | Succeeded by Sara Jacobs |
U.S. order of precedence (ceremonial)
| Preceded by Loretta Sanchez as Former U.S. Representative | Order of precedence of the United States as Former U.S. Representative | Succeeded by Joel Hefley as Former U.S. Representative |
