= Rocky Chávez =

American politician (born 1951)

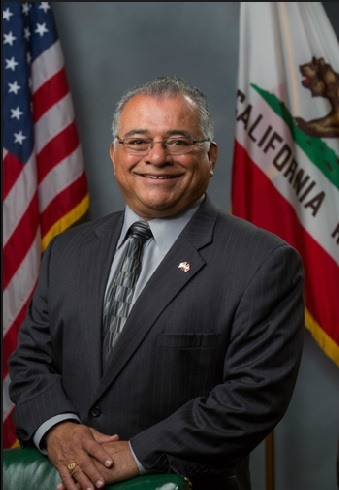

Member of the California State Assembly from the 76th district
- In office December 3, 2012 – November 30, 2018
- Preceded by: Martin Garrick
- Succeeded by: Tasha Boerner Horvath

Personal details
- Born: May 12, 1951 (age 75) Los Angeles, California, U.S.
- Party: Republican
- Spouse: Mary Margaret
- Children: 3
- Education: El Camino College; California State University, Chico

Military service
- Allegiance: United States
- Branch/service: United States Marine Corps
- Rank: Colonel

Rocky John Chávez (born May 12, 1951) is an American politician who served in the California State Assembly. A Republican, he represented the 76th district, encompassing parts of northern coastal San Diego County. He was a candidate for the United States House of Representatives, having run in the 2018 midterm election in California's 49th congressional district to replace Darrell Issa, but he failed to place in the top two during the primary election.

== Early life and career ==
Chávez was born on May 12, 1951, in Los Angeles, California. He graduated from Torrance High School in 1969 where he was a varsity wrestler. He qualified for the US Olympic trials in 1968 and 1972. After graduating high school, Chávez attended El Camino Junior College where he earned an associate degree. He then attended Chico State, where he earned a Bachelor of Arts degree in English in 1973. Chávez helped his family during grade school and college by working in agriculture, including summers picking grapes in Fresno County, California, working at a packing plant in Chico, California and gathering almonds in Hamilton City, California near Chico.

== Military career ==
Chávez began his career in public service after graduating from Chico State when he joined the United States Marine Corps. Chávez served in the USMC for 28 years, rising to the rank of Colonel. Chávez served in all four active Marine divisions, including serving as Chief of Staff for the 4th Marine Division.

== Post-military career ==
Chávez continued his career in public service after retiring from the Marine Corps. by founding the School of Business and Technology, a charter High School located in the Oceanside Unified School District. Chávez served as the school’s director from 2002-2008.

Chávez was elected to the Oceanside City Council in November, 2002. He served on the Council for seven years, focusing on economic development, public safety, and good governance. Chávez was selected as the Deputy Mayor of Oceanside in 2004.

Chávez was appointed as the Undersecretary of the California Department of Veteran Affairs by Governor Arnold Schwarzenegger in 2009. In January, 2011, Chávez was appointed Acting Secretary. During his time working at the California Department of Veteran Affairs, Chávez focused on streamlining procedures and increasing services for veterans.

Chávez was elected to the California State Assembly to represent 76th District on November 6, 2012. He ran on a campaign of education, veteran’s issues and good governance. The 76th District includes Marine Corps Base Camp Pendleton and the cities of Carlsbad, Encinitas, Oceanside and Vista.

Chávez served as Vice-Chair of the Assembly Veterans Affairs Committee and the Higher Education Committee. He was a member of the Rules, Education, Budget, Utilities and Commerce and Health committees. Chávez also served on a number of select committees, joint committees, and caucuses tackling issues ranging from justice reinvestment to environmental issues and K-12 education.

=== 2014 California State Assembly ===
California's 76th State Assembly district election, 2014
Primary election
Party	Candidate	Votes	%
Republican	Rocky Chavez (incumbent)	40,764	99.9
Republican	Thomas Krouse (write-in)	28	0.1
Total votes		40,792	100.0
General election
Republican	Rocky Chavez (incumbent)	58,823	66.9
Republican	Thomas Krouse	29,065	33.1
Total votes		87,888	100.0
Republican hold			

=== 2016 Senate run ===
Chávez briefly ran for the United States Senate to replace the retiring Democrat Barbara Boxer. On KOGO, before a radio debate, he announced he was no longer going to run.

=== 2016 California State Assembly ===
California's 76th State Assembly district election, 2016
Primary election
Party	Candidate	Votes	%
Republican	Rocky Chávez (incumbent)	68,819	99.5
Republican	Thomas E. Krouse (write-in)	376	0.5
Total votes		69,195	100.0
General election
Republican	Rocky Chávez (incumbent)	95,477	59.4
Republican	Thomas E. Krouse	65,377	40.6
Total votes		160,854	100.0
Republican hold			

=== 2018 United States House of Representatives ===
Chávez was a candidate for the United States House of Representatives, having run in the 2018 midterm election in California's 49th congressional district to replace Darrell Issa. He failed to place in the top two during the primary election, finishing sixth in a field of sixteen candidates.

==== Primary for U.S. House California District 49 ====
The following candidates ran in the primary for U.S. House California District 49 on June 5, 2018.

Candidate	%	Votes	Candidate	%	Votes
Diane Harkey (R)	25.5	46,468	Mike Schmitt (R)	1.3	2,379
Mike Levin (D)	17.5	31,850	Joshua Schoonover (R)	0.7	1,362
Sara Jacobs (D)	15.8	28,778	Craig Nordal (R)	0.6	1,156
Douglas Applegate (D)	13.1	23,850	David Medway (R)	0.6	1,066
Kristin Gaspar (R)	8.5	15,467	Robert Pendleton (Independent)	0.5	905
Rocky Chávez (R)	7.5	13,739	Danielle St. John (G)	0.4	690
Paul Kerr (D)	4.4	8,099	Joshua Hancock (L)	0.3	552
Brian Maryott (R)	3.0	5,496	Jordan Mills (Peace and Freedom Party)	0.1	233
There were no incumbents in this race. The results have been certified.	Total votes: 182,090				

== Personal life ==
Chávez and his wife Mary live in Oceanside, California. They have three children and five grandchildren. Mary studied at the University of New Orleans and also holds an M.B.A. from California State University, San Marcos. His son Temujin Tom is a physician in South Carolina. Chávez's daughter Regina Ann Shepperson and youngest son Sage John are both college graduates. Chávez is Catholic.
