= Hotel Vendome (San Jose, California) =

Hotel in Santa Clara County, California (1889–1930)

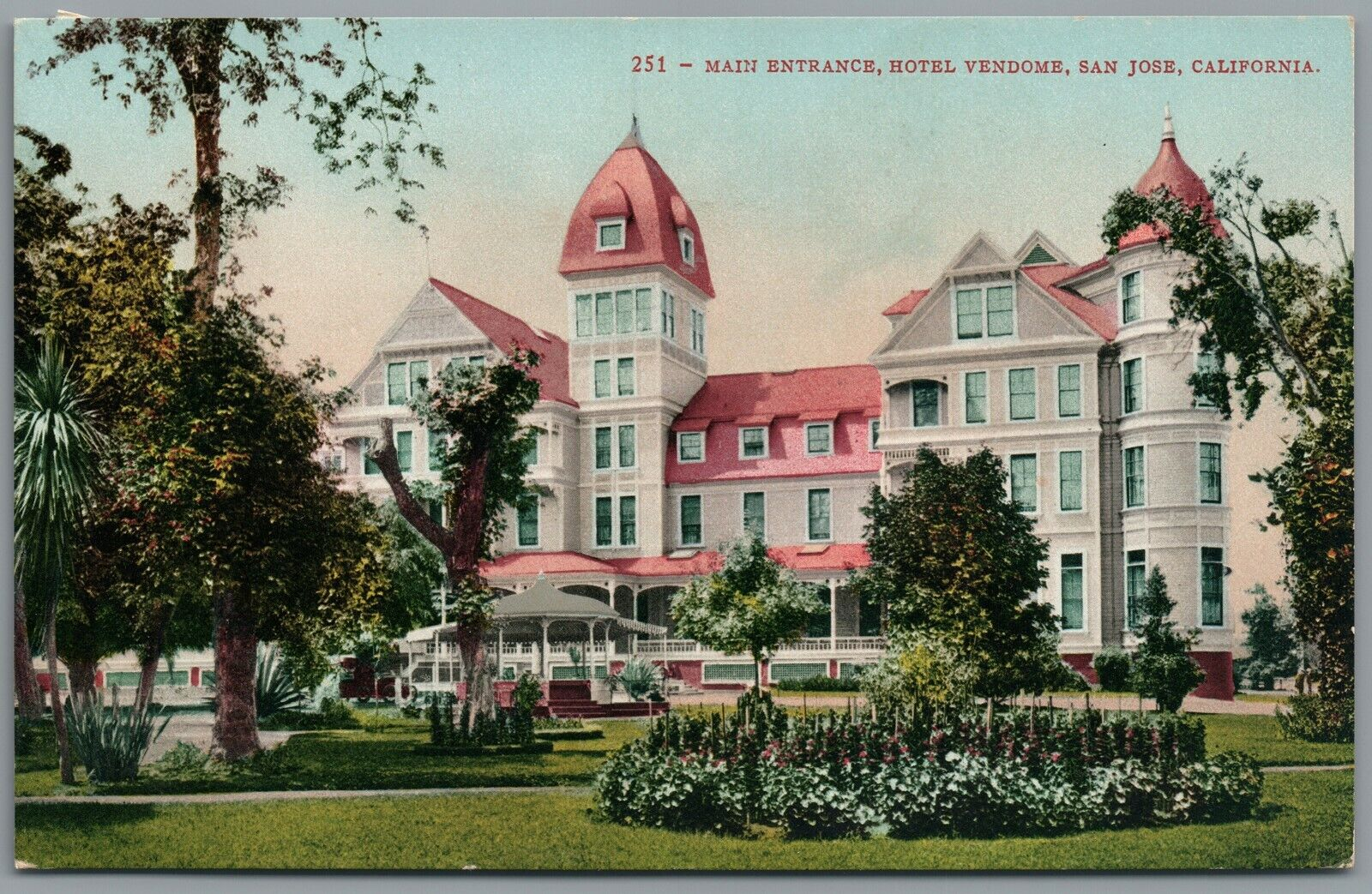
- Interactive map of the Hotel Vendome area

General information
- Architectural style: Queen Anne style
- Location: 549 North First Street, San Jose, California, U.S.
- Coordinates: 37.345528°N 121.8977735°W
- Opened: January 1889
- Closed: April 30, 1930

Technical details
- Size: 11 acres (4.5 ha)

Design and construction
- Architects: Jacob Lenzen and Son, Architects

Other information
- Number of rooms: 150

Hotel Vendome was a hotel active from 1889 until 1930 in San Jose, California. It was designed in Queen Anne style architecture, and has since been demolished. It was a major resort with 150 rooms, extensive grounds, and offered excursions to local attractions such as Lick Observatory, the New Almaden Mine, and Alum Rock Park.

== History ==
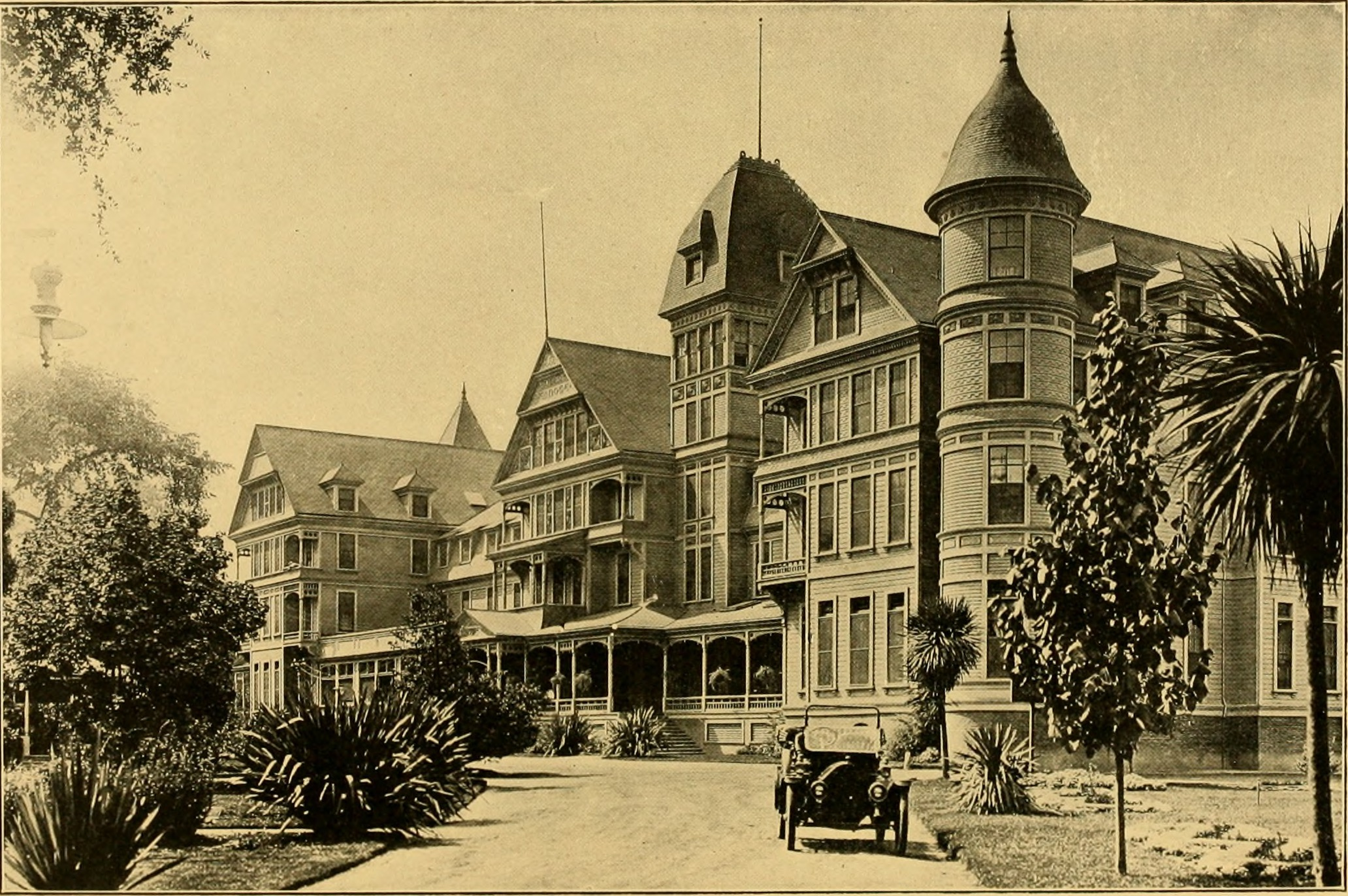
Hotel Vendome, 1910

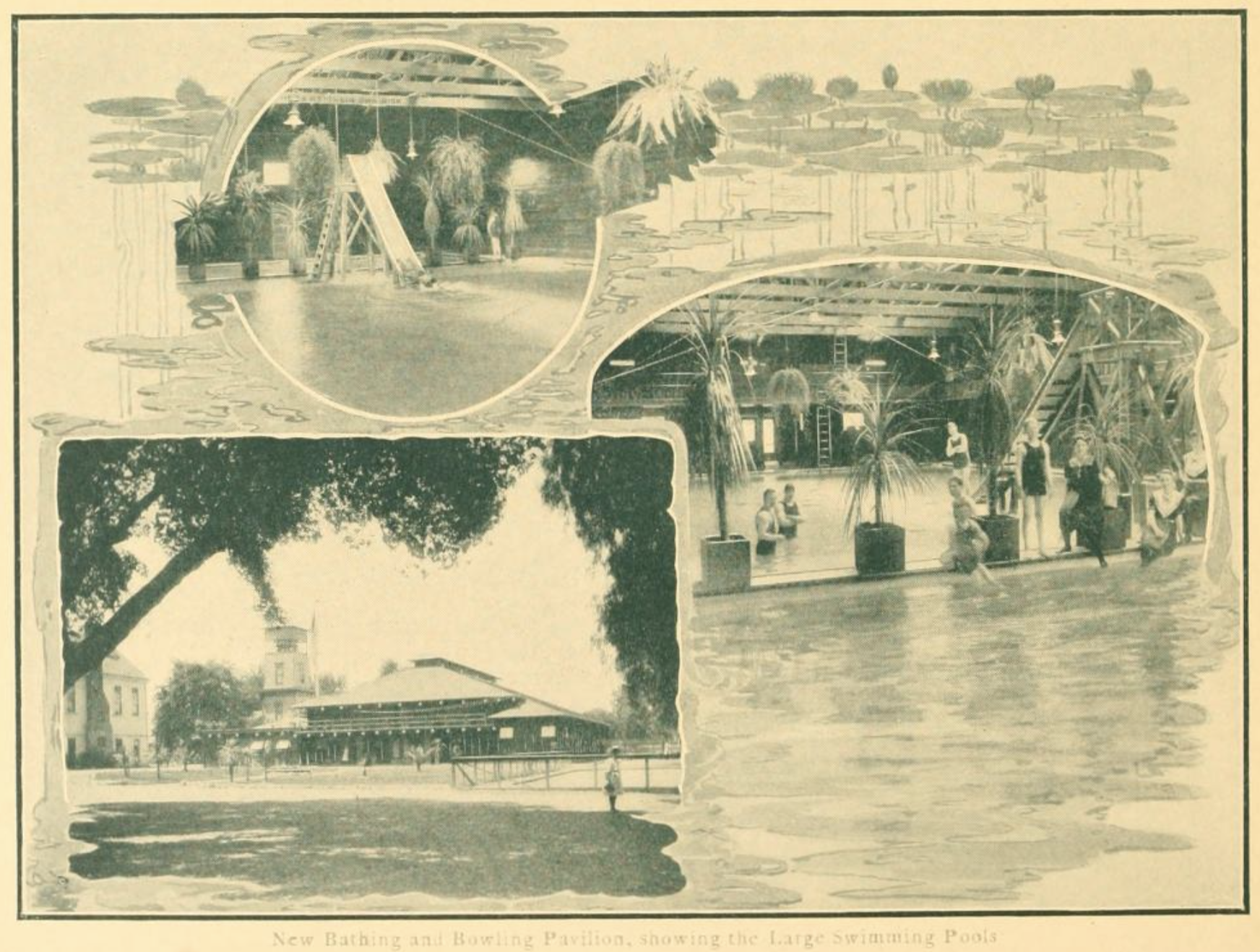
Bathing Pavilion at the Hotel Vendome (c. 1900)

Hotel Vendome was founded under the incorporated business name of The Hotel Vendome Company by James Butterworth Randol (J. B. Randol, serving as president), T. S. Potts (as vice president), T. Montgomery (as secretary), Thomas S. Morrison, Lazard Lion (L. Lion), Gustave F. Lion, A. McDonald, M. C. Mabury, and W. P. Dougherty. It was named after Paris's Place Vendôme, a common name used by hotels in the late 19th century in the United States. This hotel was built on land that had previously housed the residence of Senator Cabell H. Maddox (commonly known as C. H. Maddox), at 549 North First Street in San Jose, California.

The building was designed by the architecture firm of Jacob Lenzen and Son, Architects, led by Jacob Lenzen Jr., his brother Theodore W. Lenzen, and Theodore's son Louis Theodore Lenzen Sr. It was designed in a grand Queen Anne architectural style, featuring three and a half floors, a tower, a belvedere, and multiple porches.

The hotel opened in January 1889 with a breakfast party. Hotel Vendome had 150 rooms with en suite bathrooms, steam heat, Otis elevators, a ballroom, a barbershop, banquet rooms, and kitchens. It had 11 acres (4.5 ha) of landscaped grounds, which included numerous trees such as pines, elms, live oaks, redwoods, palms, and various tropical plants. The Vendome Stables were located on the hotel grounds along San Pedro Street and housed 40 to 60 horses of the Mount Hamilton Stage Company.

During its history, the hotel experienced many small fires, which was common in this era. In 1903, a new wing of the building was completed; it was three stories and had 34 rooms. After the 1906 San Francisco earthquake in April, the new wing of Hotel Vendome collapsed, with an estimated US$55,000 in damage. The wing housed 14 people when it collapsed, and one died. Senator Cornelius W. Pendleton from Los Angeles was staying in the hotel wing when it was destroyed; he survived the event.

The building was sold to new owners in October 1906, although the name of the new owner was not published. The hotel was closed for repairs until May 1, 1907, and the wing was never rebuilt. A few people were boarders at the Hotel Vendome, including city attorney Archer Bowden, and actress Olivia de Havilland.

== Closure ==
By March 1930, a group of real estate developers purchased for US $125,000 the hotel and the grounds, in order to demolish the building and create a new housing tract. The purchase was led by J. Bradley Clayton, the vice president of First National Bank, and the vice president of James A. Clayton and Company, a real estate firm.

Many of the local service clubs working for San Jose had asked the city to turn the land into a large public park, which never came to fruition. The location of the former hotel resides around Losse Court, in the Vendome neighborhood (near Ryland).
