= Arthur G. Fisk =

American politician

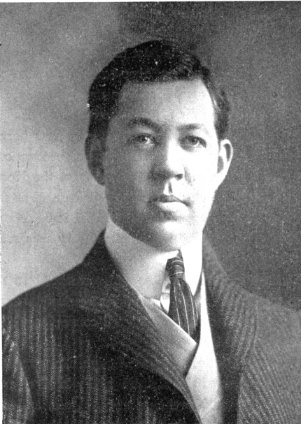

34th Speaker of the California State Assembly
- In office January 1903 – March 1903
- Preceded by: Cornelius W. Pendleton
- Succeeded by: Frank C. Prescott

Member of the California State Assembly from the 37th district
- In office January 1, 1901 – December 30, 1903
- Preceded by: William E. White
- Succeeded by: Fred C. Jones

Personal details
- Born: November 23, 1868 Baltimore, Maryland
- Died: February 25, 1938 (aged 69) Los Angeles, California
- Party: Republican
- Education: Harvard University (LLB)

Arthur G. Fisk (November 23, 1868 – February 25, 1938), was an American politician and attorney who served as the Speaker of the California State Assembly. He also served as Postmaster of San Francisco during the 1906 San Francisco earthquake, and U.S. Commissioner for Northern California in his later years. At age 65, he was sentenced to federal prison for embezzling bail bond money under his control.

== Early life and education ==
Born in Baltimore, Maryland, Fisk relocated to Santa Barbara, California with his parents in 1869. His family soon moved to San Francisco, where Fisk grew up and attended public schools. Fisk graduated from Harvard Law School in 1894.

== Career ==
After graduating from law school, Fisk returned to San Francisco to work in the law firm of former Assembly Speaker Morris M. Estee.

=== California Assembly ===
In 1900, Fisk was elected to the California State Assembly for the 37th district and served as chairman of the powerful Ways and Means Committee in 1901. Since the legislature was part-time, Fisk also ran for District Attorney of San Francisco but narrowly lost. In 1903, he was elected as Speaker of the Assembly.

=== Postmaster of San Francisco ===
Soon thereafter, Fisk was appointed as Postmaster of San Francisco. It was in this position he suffered his first public controversy. In the wake of the 1906 earthquake, Fisk had allowed mail to be sent without postage, which was technically illegal, and was estimated to cost the federal government $60,000. Fisk said he "forwarded hundreds of thousands of letters without postage throughout the United States. These letters were written on old cuffs, pieces of cardboard, anything. They went into the mail bags and I was liable to criminal prosecution...Thousands were homeless, without food and without means of communicating with relatives. I established kitchens in the basement of the post office and fed hundreds of starving people." Five years later, an act of Congress exonerated Fisk. When Democrats gained the White House in 1912, President Wilson asked for Fisk's resignation as Postmaster.

In 1913, Fisk began managing the finances of Anita Baldwin McClaugry, heiress to the fortunes of famous California businessman and racetrack industry pioneer Lucky Baldwin.

=== Sentence and incarceration ===
In 1928, Fisk was appointed as United States Commissioner for Northern California. It was in this capacity that Fisk was sued by the federal government for $25,000 for his mishandling of alien property cases. Unable to adequately fund his legal defense, Fisk embezzled bail bond money in his custody to fight the government charges against him. Although he won the original lawsuit, it was discovered he misappropriated the bail bond funds and therefore was charged for embezzlement. At age 65, Fisk pleaded guilty to charges of mishandling the bail bond money in his custody. As a result, he served two years in federal prison near Carson City, Nevada. He was released on parole in 1935 at the age of 67.

== Death ==
Fisk died in Los Angeles at age 69 on February 25, 1938, at the home of his daughter.

== Sources ==
- San Francisco Chronicle, February 26, 1938.
- Government of the State of California 1903, Fred Coleman, Sacramento: 1903.
- California Blue Book, 1903, Office of State Printing: Sacramento.
- 黄金 (1913). 萬國寄信便覽. International Chinese Business Directory Co.

Preceded by Cornelius W. Pendleton	Speaker of the California State Assembly; January 1903 – March 1903	Succeeded by Frank C. Prescott
