= William Fletcher Lemon =

American politician

William Fletcher Lemon (May 18, 1872 – December 9, 1946) was an American politician. He served in the California State Assembly and represented the 76th district.
