= Philip L. Boyd =

American politician

1st Mayor of Palm Springs
- In office April 1938 – April 1942
- Preceded by: Office established
- Succeeded by: Frank V. Shannon

Member of the California State Assembly from the 76th district
- In office January 8, 1945 - January 3, 1949
- Preceded by: Nelson S. Dilworth
- Succeeded by: John D. Babbage

Personal details
- Born: October 8, 1900 Richmond, Indiana, US
- Died: September 9, 1989 (aged 88) Rancho Mirage, California, US
- Resting place: Crown Hill Cemetery and Arboretum, Indianapolis, Indiana, U.S. 39.81664°N 86.17134°W
- Party: Republican
- Spouse: Dorothy Burroughs Marmon (m. 1926)
- Children: 4
- Parents: Linnaes Cox Boyd (father); Mary Thomas Spencer (mother)
- Education: Wabash College
- Occupation: businessman
- Awards: Zoological Society of San Diego Conservation Medal (1972)
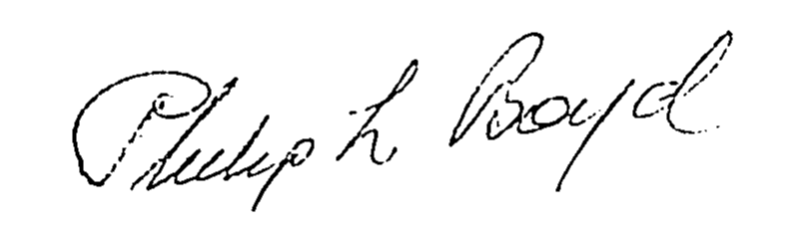
- Signature

Philip Linnaes Boyd (October 8, 1900 – September 9, 1989) was the first mayor of Palm Springs, California, a regent of the University of California and the namesake of the Deep Canyon Desert Research Center.

== Personal life ==
Philip Boyd was born October 8, 1900, in Richmond, Indiana, the son of lawyer and corporate executive Linnaes Cox Boyd and Mary Thomas Spencer, daughter of prominent businessman William F. Spencer. Boyd fell ill and was forced to drop out of Wabash College, where he was a student. In 1921, his parents brought him to Palm Springs in the hope the dry climate would help him recover. According to Boyd, his long illness forced him to consider what he would do with his life once he was healed. Boyd started work as a secretary for the Palm Springs Chamber of Commerce and opened the first branch of Bank of America in Palm Springs.

During the Great Depression, Boyd was able to delve into real estate, buying ranch lands in the area of Deep Canyon. In 1953 Boyd, who was on the board of trustees for the Palm Springs Art Museum, leased property for a nature reserve now part of the Living Desert Zoo and Gardens. Boyd encouraged faculty from the newly opened University of California, Riverside to use his nature reserve for research only to realize his public nature reserve was not a fitting setting for academic research.

In 1958, Boyd donated another parcel of land 1,701 acres (6.88 km^{2}) and funding to purchase a total of 3,500 acres (14 km^{2}) in Deep Canyon to open what is now the research center. The University of California has since acquired other contiguous property to expand the research area to its current size. The acquired lands were named after Boyd in 1961. Clark Kerr (then the President of the University) and Herman Spieth (the chancellor of the Riverside campus) commented that the reservation would allow ongoing research to continue in ecosystems threatened by urban sprawl. Boyd and his wife donated funds in 1966 to support the construction of UCR's carillon and bell tower. Boyd's memoir is archived at UCR in the Special Collections Department of Rivera Library. Boyd and his wife also donated a set of silver Towle salt and pepper shakers to the Indianapolis Museum of Art.

== Political life ==
Boyd was instrumental in incorporating Palm Springs, serving as the town's first mayor from 1938 to 1942. He ran unopposed for a seat in the California State Assembly, representing Riverside in what had been then called the 76th Assembly District from 1945 to 1949. While an assemblyman, Boyd voted to establish University of California, Riverside. As a member of California's State Public Works Boards Boyd participated in the logistical process of establishing the UCR campus. In 1950, he was elected chairman of the California Republican Party's central committee, beating out the serving vice-chairman who would traditionally have been elected. In 1957, Goodwin J. Knight, then Governor of California, appointed Boyd as a Regent of the University of California system. Boyd resigned his position as regent April 1, 1970 after new laws changed the financial disclosure requirements for state officials.
