= D. W. Hasson =

American physician and politician

D. W. Hasson (February 20, 1847 – 1927) was an American physician and politician. He served as a member of the California State Assembly, representing the 76th district.

== Early life and military service ==
Hasson was born in Illinois on February 20, 1847. During the American Civil War, he served in the Union Army as a private in Company F of the 92nd Illinois Volunteer Infantry Regiment and later in Company G of the 65th Illinois Volunteer Infantry Regiment. He was mustered out in July 1865 at Greensboro, North Carolina.

== Medical career ==
Hasson studied medicine at the Medical Department of Iowa State University and received his M.D. degree in 1877. He practiced medicine in several communities before settling in Buena Park, California. He practiced there for many years and was for much of that time the community's only physician.

Hasson was a member of the Orange County Medical Association, served as superintendent of Norfolk Hospital in Nebraska, and was a trustee of the Buena Park school system. He also served as clerk and recorder of Union County, South Dakota.

== Political career ==
Hasson represented the 76th district in the California State Assembly.

== Personal life and death ==
Hasson married Susan Amie Madison in 1877, and they had three sons. He was a member and commander of Malvern Hill Post No. 131 of the Grand Army of the Republic.

Hasson died in 1927 in Buena Park, California, and was buried at Anaheim Cemetery.
