= Philip L. Boyd Deep Canyon Desert Research Center =

Research site in California, United States

- Location within California Location within the United States
- Nearest city: Palm Desert, California
- Coordinates: 33°38′N 116°24′W
- Area: 2,469 hectares [ha] (24.69 km^{2}) (Note: The University of California has agreements with federal agencies for the use of tens of thousands of acres adjacent to the Research Center. Studies at Deep Canyon often cover transects across the adjacent properties.)
- Created: 1958
- Operator: University of California, Riverside
- Website: deepcanyon.ucnrs.org

The Philip L. Boyd Deep Canyon Desert Research Center is one of the original seven of the total 39 sites in the University of California Natural Reserve System. It contains lands originally donated to the university by regent Philip L. Boyd in 1958. The Research Center is contained within UNESCO's Mojave and Colorado Deserts Biosphere Reserve.

== Background ==
Deep Canyon, immediately east of the Palms to Pines Scenic Byway, is located inside the Santa Rosa and San Jacinto Mountains National Monument at the western edge of the Colorado Desert. The canyon cuts into the north face of the Santa Rosa Mountains creating cliffs 394 metres (1,293 ft) high. The canyon, created by an intermittent stream carrying moisture from the mountains, extends 13 kilometres (8.1 mi) dropping 1,500 metres (4,900 ft) in elevation down to 300 metres (980 ft) where an alluvial fan pours into the Coachella Valley. The temporary flows of Deep Canyon Creek seldom reach the alluvial fan and never meet Salton Sea. Because the canyon lies in a rain shadow the climate is very arid and summertime temperatures reach 36 °C (97 °F). The upper Sonoran, lower Sonoran, and transitional life zones are represented across this expanse. The flora includes creosote bushes, palo verde trees, and ocotillo. In places where water collects California fan palms and bighorn sheep can be found.

The first scientific expedition to the site was carried out in 1908 by Harry Swarth and Joseph Grinnell on behalf of University of California, Berkeley's Museum of Vertebrate Zoology. Philip L. Boyd, a Regent of the University of California, leased the land for the Living Desert Zoo and Gardens and invited faculty of the newly opened University of California, Riverside to use the property for research. When the need for a non-public range became evident, Boyd donated the initial 1,701 acres (6.88 km^{2}) of land in Deep Canyon in 1958 as well as the funding to spur the university to acquire other contiguous properties. Construction began on the first hard facilities on site in 1961 and commemoration of the site with a bronze plaque took place on March 7, 1970, naming the center after Boyd. The first director of the research center was Irwin P. Ting. As of 2015 the director of the research center is Dr. Chris Tracy.

The cactus Opuntia acanthocarpa has been studied at Agave Hill. In 2010 a study of 35 species of Mutillid wasps revealed four new species, two of which (Odontophotopsis hammetti and Sphaeropthalma mankelli) are only known to exist at the center. The center was the study ground for a 2013 National Science Foundation grant to develop a new method for identifying species of nematodes. A series of five books (Mammals of Deep Canyon in 1968, Ants of Deep Canyon in 1973, Deep Canyon, a Desert Wilderness for Science in 1976, Birds of Deep Canyon in 1979, and Birds of Southern California's Deep Canyon in 1983) discuss the biodiversity of the area.

Because of the remoteness of Deep Canyon, it hosts one of the 300 worldwide optical fiber infrasound sensors (OFIS) used to implement the Comprehensive Nuclear-Test-Ban Treaty.
