= California's 76th State Assembly district =

American legislative district

Current assemblymember
| Darshana Patel; D–San Diego |
- Population (2010) • Voting age • Citizen voting age: 468,627; 355,819; 294,133
- Demographics: 57.89% White; 3.50% Black; 29.33% Latino; 6.75% Asian; 0.73% Native American; 0.86% Hawaiian/Pacific Islander; 0.28% other; 0.66% remainder of multiracial
- Registered voters: 270,093
- Registration: 37.21% Democratic; 31.12% Republican; 25.33% No party preference

California's 76th State Assembly district is one of 80 California State Assembly districts. It is currently represented by Democrat Darshana Patel of San Diego.

== District profile ==
Prior to the 2021 redirecting, the district encompassed coastal North County, stretching from Marine Corps Base Camp Pendleton in the north to Encinitas in the south. The district at the time comprised a relatively affluent and military-centered population.

San Diego County – 15.1%

- Camp Pendleton North
- Camp Pendleton South
- Carlsbad
- Encinitas
- Oceanside
- Vista

== Election results from statewide races ==
| Year | Office | Results |
|---|---|---|
| 2020 | President | Biden 58.2 – 39.3% |
| 2018 | Governor | Newsom 54.7 – 45.3% |
| 2018 | Senator | Feinstein 51.9 – 48.1% |
| 2016 | President | Clinton 53.1 – 40.4% |
| 2016 | Senator | Harris 61.0 – 39.0% |
| 2014 | Governor | Kashkari 52.2 – 47.8% |
| 2012 | President | Romney 49.0 – 48.8% |
| 2012 | Senator | Emken 50.7 – 49.3% |

== List of assembly members representing the district ==
Due to redistricting, the 76th district has been moved around different parts of the state. The current iteration resulted from the 2021 redistricting by the California Citizens Redistricting Commission.

| Assembly members | Party | Years served | Counties represented | Notes |
|---|---|---|---|---|
| Jabez Banbury | Republican | January 5, 1885 – January 3, 1887 | Los Angeles | |
| John R. Brierly | Republican | January 3, 1887 – January 5, 1891 | Los Angeles | |
| F. N. Marion | Republican | January 5, 1891 – January 2, 1893 | Los Angeles | |
| Charles Franklin Bennett | Democratic | January 2, 1893 – January 7, 1895 | Orange | |
| Charles Sumner McKelvey | Republican | January 7, 1895 – January 4, 1897 | Orange | |
| H. W. Chynoweth | Republican | January 4, 1897 – January 1, 1901 | Orange | |
| D. W. Hasson | Republican | January 1, 1901 – January 5, 1903 | Orange | |
| Frank C. Prescott | Republican | January 5, 1903 – January 7, 1907 | San Bernardino | |
| William Fletcher Lemon | Republican | January 7, 1907 – January 4, 1909 | San Bernardino | |
| John Wesley Flavelle | Republican | January 4, 1909 – January 2, 1911 | San Bernardino | |
| Cornelius Gerrit Hendrik Bennink | Republican | January 2, 1911 – January 6, 1913 | San Bernardino | |
| Hans V. Weisel | Republican | January 6, 1913 – January 4, 1915 | Orange | |
| Joe Charles Burke | Republican | January 4, 1915 – January 6, 1919 | Orange | |
| Walter Eden | Republican | January 6, 1919 – January 3, 1921 | Orange | |
| William O. Hart | Republican | January 3, 1921 – January 8, 1923 | Orange | |
| Charles Dexter Ball | Republican | January 8, 1923 – January 5, 1925 | Orange | |
| Samuel Cloyd Hartranft | Republican | January 5, 1925 – January 3, 1927 | Orange | |
| Charles Dexter Ball | Republican | January 3, 1927 – January 7, 1929 | Orange | |
| Edward Craig | Republican | January 7, 1929 – January 5, 1931 | Orange | |
| Chester M. Kline | Republican | January 5, 1931 – January 2, 1933 | Riverside | |
| John R. Phillips | Republican | January 2, 1933 – January 4, 1937 | Riverside | |
| Nelson S. Dilworth | Republican | January 4, 1937 – January 8, 1945 | Riverside | |
| Philip L. Boyd | Republican | January 8, 1945 – January 3, 1949 | Riverside | |
| John D. Babbage | Republican | January 3, 1949 – January 5, 1953 | Riverside | |
| J. Ward Casey | Republican | January 5, 1953 – January 7, 1957 | Imperial | |
| Leverette D. House | Democratic | January 7, 1957 – January 7, 1963 | Imperial | |
| Clair Burgener | Republican | January 7, 1963 – January 2, 1967 | San Diego | |
| Pete Wilson | Republican | January 2, 1967 – December 5, 1971 | San Diego | Resigned to become mayor of San Diego. |
| Vacant | | December 5, 1971 – March 6, 1972 | San Diego | |
| Bob Wilson | Democratic | March 6, 1972 – November 30, 1974 | San Diego | Sworn in after winning special election. |
| William A. Craven | Republican | December 2, 1974 – November 30, 1978 | San Diego | |
| Robert C. Frazee | Republican | December 4, 1978 – November 30, 1982 | San Diego | |
| Bill Randolph Bradley | Republican | December 6, 1982 – June 1, 1989 | Riverside, San Diego | Died in office from cancer. |
| Vacant | | June 1, 1989 – October 10, 1989 | Riverside, San Diego | |
| Tricia Hunter | Republican | October 10, 1989 – November 30, 1992 | Riverside, San Diego | Sworn in office after winning special election. |
| Mike Gotch | Democratic | December 7, 1992 – November 30, 1994 | San Diego | |
| Susan Davis | Democratic | December 5, 1994 – November 30, 2000 | San Diego | |
| Christine Kehoe | Democratic | December 4, 2000 – November 30, 2004 | San Diego | |
| Lori Saldaña | Democratic | December 6, 2004 – November 30, 2010 | San Diego | |
| Toni Atkins | Democratic | December 6, 2010 – November 30, 2012 | San Diego | |
| Rocky Chávez | Republican | December 3, 2012 – November 30, 2018 | San Diego | |
| Tasha Boerner Horvath | Democratic | December 3, 2018 – November 30, 2022 | San Diego | |
| Brian Maienschein | Democratic | December 5, 2022 – November 30, 2024 | San Diego | |
| Darshana Patel | Democratic | December 2, 2024 – present | San Diego | |

== Election results (1989–present) ==
=== 2024 ===
2024 California State Assembly 76th district election
Primary election
| Party | Candidate | Votes | % |
|---|---|---|---|
| Republican | Kristie Bruce-Lane | 49,316 | 49.5 |
| Democratic | Darshana Patel | 34,066 | 34.2 |
| Democratic | Joseph Rocha | 16,312 | 16.4 |
| Total votes | | 99,694 | 100.0 |
General election
| Democratic | Darshana Patel | 113,242 | 54.0 |
| Republican | Kristie Bruce-Lane | 96,358 | 46.0 |
| Total votes | | 209,600 | 100.0 |
| Democratic hold | | | |

=== 2022 ===
2022 California State Assembly 76th district election
Primary election
| Party | Candidate | Votes | % |
|---|---|---|---|
| Democratic | Brian Maienschein (incumbent) | 48,635 | 49.9 |
| Republican | Kristie Bruce-Lane | 27,375 | 28.1 |
| Republican | June Cutter | 21,381 | 22.0 |
| Total votes | | 97,391 | 100.0 |
General election
| Democratic | Brian Maienschein (incumbent) | 78,895 | 51.6 |
| Republican | Kristie Bruce-Lane | 73,944 | 48.4 |
| Total votes | | 152,839 | 100.0 |
| Democratic hold | | | |

=== 2020 ===
2020 California State Assembly 76th district election
Primary election
| Party | Candidate | Votes | % |
|---|---|---|---|
| Democratic | Tasha Boerner (incumbent) | 77,792 | 57.5 |
| Republican | Melanie Burkholder | 57,391 | 42.5 |
| Total votes | | 135,183 | 100.0 |
General election
| Democratic | Tasha Boerner (incumbent) | 132,688 | 55.6 |
| Republican | Melanie Burkholder | 105,855 | 44.4 |
| Total votes | | 238,543 | 100.0 |
| Democratic hold | | | |

=== 2018 ===
2018 California State Assembly 76th district election
Primary election
| Party | Candidate | Votes | % |
|---|---|---|---|
| Democratic | Elizabeth Warren | 28,755 | 26.2 |
| Democratic | Tasha Boerner | 27,566 | 25.1 |
| Republican | Phil Graham | 23,155 | 21.1 |
| Republican | Mo Muir | 9,642 | 8.8 |
| Republican | Thomas E. Krouse | 8,675 | 7.9 |
| Republican | Amanda Rigby | 5,919 | 5.4 |
| Republican | Jerome Stocks | 5,119 | 4.7 |
| Republican | Brian Wimmer | 840 | 0.8 |
| Total votes | | 109,671 | 100.0 |
General election
| Democratic | Tasha Boerner | 79,769 | 54.6 |
| Democratic | Elizabeth Warren | 66,427 | 45.4 |
| Total votes | | 146,196 | 100.0 |
| Democratic gain from Republican | | | |

=== 2016 ===
2016 California State Assembly 76th district election
Primary election
| Party | Candidate | Votes | % |
|---|---|---|---|
| Republican | Rocky Chávez (incumbent) | 68,819 | 99.5 |
| Republican | Thomas E. Krouse (write-in) | 376 | 0.5 |
| Total votes | | 69,195 | 100.0 |
General election
| Republican | Rocky Chávez (incumbent) | 95,477 | 59.4 |
| Republican | Thomas E. Krouse | 65,377 | 40.6 |
| Total votes | | 160,854 | 100.0 |
| Republican hold | | | |

=== 2014 ===
2014 California State Assembly 76th district election
Primary election
| Party | Candidate | Votes | % |
|---|---|---|---|
| Republican | Rocky Chávez (incumbent) | 40,764 | 99.9 |
| Republican | Thomas Krouse (write-in) | 28 | 0.1 |
| Total votes | | 40,792 | 100.0 |
General election
| Republican | Rocky Chávez (incumbent) | 58,824 | 66.9 |
| Republican | Thomas Krouse | 29,065 | 33.1 |
| Total votes | | 87,889 | 100.0 |
| Republican hold | | | |

=== 2012 ===
2012 California State Assembly 76th district election
Primary election
| Party | Candidate | Votes | % |
|---|---|---|---|
| Republican | Rocky Chávez | 25,143 | 38.8 |
| Republican | Sherry Hodges | 21,100 | 32.6 |
| Republican | Farrah Douglas | 18,570 | 28.7 |
| Total votes | | 64,813 | 100.0 |
General election
| Republican | Rocky Chávez | 88,295 | 58.2 |
| Republican | Sherry Hodges | 63,526 | 41.8 |
| Total votes | | 151,821 | 100.0 |
| Republican gain from Democratic | | | |

=== 2010 ===
2010 California State Assembly 76th district election
| Party | Candidate | Votes | % |
|---|---|---|---|
| Democratic | Toni Atkins | 75,357 | 57.7 |
| Republican | Ralph Denney | 48,610 | 37.2 |
| Libertarian | Daniel H. Baehr | 6,679 | 5.1 |
| Total votes | | 130,646 | 100.0 |
| Democratic hold | | | |

=== 2008 ===
2008 California State Assembly 76th district election
| Party | Candidate | Votes | % |
|---|---|---|---|
| Democratic | Lori Saldaña (incumbent) | 113,754 | 64.2 |
| Republican | Ralph Denney | 55,128 | 31.1 |
| Libertarian | Daniel Baehr | 8,224 | 4.6 |
| Total votes | | 177,106 | 100.0 |
| Democratic hold | | | |

=== 2006 ===
2006 California State Assembly 76th district election
| Party | Candidate | Votes | % |
|---|---|---|---|
| Democratic | Lori Saldaña (incumbent) | 73,932 | 64.4 |
| Republican | Ralph Denney | 39,530 | 34.4 |
| Republican | Kim Tran (write-in) | 1,335 | 1.2 |
| Total votes | | 114,797 | 100.0 |
| Democratic hold | | | |

=== 2004 ===
2004 California State Assembly 76th district election
| Party | Candidate | Votes | % |
|---|---|---|---|
| Democratic | Lori Saldaña | 93,601 | 54.2 |
| Republican | Tricia Hunter | 71,320 | 41.3 |
| Libertarian | Jennifer Osborne | 7,918 | 4.6 |
| Total votes | | 172,839 | 100.0 |
| Democratic hold | | | |

=== 2002 ===
2002 California State Assembly 76th district election
| Party | Candidate | Votes | % |
|---|---|---|---|
| Democratic | Christine Kehoe (incumbent) | 63,682 | 62.4 |
| Republican | Bob Divine | 34,872 | 34.1 |
| Libertarian | Sarah N. Baker | 3,580 | 3.5 |
| Total votes | | 102,134 | 100.0 |
| Democratic hold | | | |

=== 2000 ===
2000 California State Assembly 76th district election
| Party | Candidate | Votes | % |
|---|---|---|---|
| Democratic | Christine Kehoe | 82,965 | 61.1 |
| Republican | Michelle M. Nash-Hoff | 47,295 | 34.8 |
| Libertarian | David T. Oakey | 5,544 | 4.1 |
| Total votes | | 135,804 | 100.0 |
| Democratic hold | | | |

=== 1998 ===
1998 California State Assembly 76th district election
| Party | Candidate | Votes | % |
|---|---|---|---|
| Democratic | Susan Davis (incumbent) | 70,244 | 65.3 |
| Republican | Duane A. Admire | 34,143 | 31.7 |
| Libertarian | Edward M. Teyssier | 3,159 | 2.9 |
| Total votes | | 107,546 | 100.0 |
| Democratic hold | | | |

=== 1996 ===
1996 California State Assembly 76th district election
| Party | Candidate | Votes | % |
|---|---|---|---|
| Democratic | Susan Davis (incumbent) | 70,799 | 53.0 |
| Republican | Bob Trettin | 59,128 | 44.3 |
| Peace and Freedom | Christine Freel | 3,534 | 2.6 |
| Total votes | | 133,461 | 100.0 |
| Democratic hold | | | |

=== 1994 ===
1994 California State Assembly 76th district election
| Party | Candidate | Votes | % |
|---|---|---|---|
| Democratic | Susan Davis | 54,055 | 49.4 |
| Republican | Bob Trettin | 49,884 | 45.6 |
| Libertarian | Jerry Balistreri | 3,525 | 3.2 |
| Peace and Freedom | Donald R. Lake | 1,883 | 1.7 |
| Total votes | | 109,347 | 100.0 |
| Democratic hold | | | |

=== 1992 ===
1992 California State Assembly 76th district election
| Party | Candidate | Votes | % |
|---|---|---|---|
| Democratic | Mike Gotch (incumbent) | 85,409 | 57.2 |
| Republican | Dick Dajeke | 55,230 | 37.0 |
| Libertarian | Pat Wright | 5,366 | 3.6 |
| Peace and Freedom | Forest H. Worten | 3,189 | 2.1 |
| Total votes | | 149,194 | 100.0 |
| Democratic gain from Republican | | | |

=== 1990 ===
1990 California State Assembly 76th district election
| Party | Candidate | Votes | % |
|---|---|---|---|
| Republican | Tricia Hunter (incumbent) | 83,895 | 57.1 |
| Democratic | Steve Thorne | 39,304 | 26.7 |
| Libertarian | Bill Holmes | 13,751 | 9.4 |
| Peace and Freedom | Renale M. Kline | 6,958 | 4.7 |
| No party | Edward L. Day (write-in) | 3,123 | 2.1 |
| Total votes | | 147,031 | 100.0 |
| Republican hold | | | |

=== 1989 (special) ===
1989 California State Assembly 76th district special election Vacancy resulting from the death of Bill Bradley
| Party | Candidate | Votes | % |
|---|---|---|---|
| Republican | Tricia Hunter | 25,736 | 48.8 |
| No party | Dick Lyles (write-in) | 20,157 | 38.3 |
| Democratic | Jeannine Correia | 6,734 | 12.8 |
| No party | Kirby Bowser (write-in) | 63 | 0.1 |
| Total votes | | 52,690 | 100.0 |
| Republican hold | | | |

== See also ==
- California State Assembly
- California State Assembly districts
- Districts in California
