= Lori Saldaña =

American politician

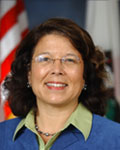

Speaker pro tempore of the California State Assembly
- In office December 1, 2008 – March 18, 2010
- Preceded by: Sally Lieber
- Succeeded by: Fiona Ma

Member of the California State Assembly from the 76th district
- In office December 6, 2004 – November 30, 2010
- Preceded by: Christine Kehoe
- Succeeded by: Toni Atkins

Personal details
- Born: November 7, 1958 (age 67) San Diego, California, U.S.
- Party: Democratic (before 2014, 2017–present)
- Other political affiliations: Independent (2014–2016)
- Education: San Diego State University

Lori R. Saldaña (born November 7, 1958) is an American politician who served as Speaker pro tempore of the California State Assembly from 2008 to 2010. A member of the Democratic Party, she served in the California State Assembly from 2004 to 2010, representing the 76th Assembly district.

After leaving the Assembly, Saldaña has run unsuccessfully for a number of other elected offices, including California's 52nd congressional district, mayor of San Diego, San Diego County Board of Supervisors, and member of the San Diego City Council from District 2.

== Early life, education, and academic career ==
Lori Saldaña was born in 1958 in San Diego, the third of four daughters born to Virginia and Frank Saldaña. Frank Saldaña served in the Marine Corps and was a reporter for the San Diego Evening Tribune. Saldaña grew up in the Clairemont area of San Diego. After graduation from Madison High School, she attended San Diego State University (SDSU), earning both a Bachelor of Arts degree and a master's degree in Education.

Saldaña started her post-graduate life as a coach at San Diego City College, Clairemont High School, and Madison High School. Later, she worked as a professor and administrator in the San Diego Community College District, where she taught Business Information Technology and managed Department of Labor grants used to provide technical skills and training to the student base. She has also taught at her alma mater, San Diego State University.

She is the author of Lori Saldaña's Backpacking Primer (1995).

== California Assembly ==
=== Elections ===
In 2004, incumbent State Assemblywoman Christine Kehoe of California's 76th State Assembly district decided to retire in order to run for a seat in the California Senate. Saldaña ran for the open seat and won the Democratic primary with a plurality of 41% of the vote. In the general election, she defeated Republican Tricia Hunter, a former Assemblywoman, 54%-41%. In 2006, she won re-election to a second term with 64% of the vote. In 2008, she won re-election to a third term with 64% of the vote. She left the Assembly due to term limits in 2010.

=== Tenure ===
In 2007 Saldaña was named Legislator of the Year by Californians Against Waste for her legislation regarding E-waste.

In the 2009 session of the state legislature, Saldana introduced three bills that would restrict California's ballot initiative process:

- Assembly Bill 6, which would require petition drive management companies to pay an annual fee and register with the California Secretary of State
- Assembly Bill 426, which would increase the fee that proponents of an initiative measure are required to pay at the time of submitting the draft of the measure to the Attorney General from $200 to $2,000.
- Assembly Bill 1068, which would forbid contracts with signature gatherers premised upon whether or not the measure qualifies for the ballot.

Due to California's term limits, Saldaña's assembly career ended on August 31, 2010 in an acrimonious late-night session as she pushed legislation banning the open carry of firearms known as AB 1934. Saldaña presented her bill to the Assembly with 70 minutes remaining in the 2010 regular session, and would not suspend debate when it became clear that its opponents would not let it come to an early vote. Saldaña later clashed with fellow Democrats over their refusal to employ parliamentary procedure tactics to end debate so her measure could be heard.

=== Committee assignments ===
She was appointed Assistant Majority Whip and served on the Appropriations, Natural Resources, Veteran's Affairs, and Water, Parks and Wildlife committees.

== 2012 Congressional election ==
Originally, she was planning on running for a seat in the California Senate, but instead decided to run in the newly redrawn California's 52nd congressional district. She came in third place in the open primary and did not advance to the general election, which was ultimately won by Scott Peters.

== 2016 San Diego Mayoral election ==
In January 2016, she announced her candidacy for the mayor of San Diego against incumbent mayor Kevin Faulconer in his bid for re-election. For this election, she ran with a party affiliation of "no preference," though the office of mayor is officially nonpartisan. She lost in the primary to Faulconer, coming in second.

== 2018 San Diego County Board of Supervisors election ==
In 2018, Saldaña ran for a seat on the officially nonpartisan San Diego County Board of Supervisors. She campaigned as a Democrat, having changed her party affiliation back after the mayoral election. She came in third place in the open primary and did not advance to the general election, which was ultimately won by Nathan Fletcher.

== 2022 San Diego City Council election ==
In 2022, Saldaña ran in the primary for the officially nonpartisan San Diego City Council. She campaigned as a Democrat, She came in third place in the open primary and did not advance to the general election, which was won by Jennifer Campbell.

California Assembly
| Preceded by Sally Lieber | Speaker pro tempore of the California Assembly; December 1, 2008 – March 18, 2010 | Succeeded by Fiona Ma |
Political offices
| Preceded by Christine Kehoe | California State Assemblymember, 76th district December 6, 2004 – December 5, 2010 | Succeeded by Toni Atkins |
