= 2020 San Diego elections =

2020 San Diego City Council election
- November 3, 2020

5 of the 9 seats on the San Diego City Council
	Majority party	Minority party	Third party
Party	Democratic	Republican	Independent
Seats before	6	2	1
Seats after	8	1	0
Seat change	▲2	▼1	▼1
Council President before election
Georgette Gómez
Democratic
Elected Council President
Jennifer Campbell
Democratic

Municipal elections were held in San Diego in 2020 for mayor, city attorney, and city council. The primary election occurred Tuesday, March 3, 2020, and the general election occurred Tuesday, November 3, 2020. Five of the nine council seats were contested. No council incumbents stood for reelection.

Municipal elections in California are officially non-partisan, although most members do identify a party preference. A two-round system was used for the elections, starting with primaries in March followed by runoff elections in November between the top-two candidates in each race.

== City council ==
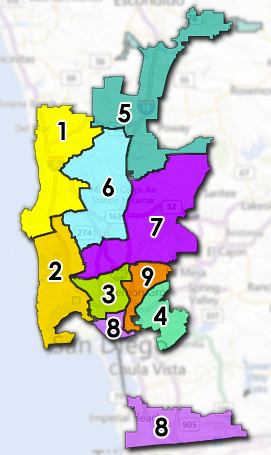
Council Districts used for the 2020 election

Seats in San Diego City Council districts 1, 3, 5, 7, and 9 were up for election. Incumbents Mark Kersey (District 5) and Scott Sherman (District 7) were ineligible to run for reelection due to term limits. The other three incumbent council members chose to run for higher office rather than seek reelection: Barbara Bry (District 1) for mayor of San Diego, Chris Ward (District 3) for California's 78th State Assembly district, and Georgette Gómez (District 9) for California's 53rd congressional district.

=== District 1 ===
District 1 consists of the communities of Carmel Valley, Del Mar Mesa, Del Mar Heights, La Jolla, Pacific Highlands Ranch, Torrey Hills, Torrey Pines, and University City. No Republican candidates contested the race.

2020 San Diego City Council District 1 election
Primary election
Party	Candidate	Votes	%
Democratic	Joe LaCava	10,355	24.1
Democratic	Will Moore	7,054	16.4
Democratic	Aaron Brennan	6,399	14.9
Democratic	Sam Nejabat	5,884	13.7
Independent	Lijun (Lily) Zhou	3,910	9.1
Democratic	James P. Rudolph	3,505	8.2
Democratic	Harid "H." Puentes	3,340	7.8
Democratic	Louis A. Rodolico	2,484	5.8
Total votes		42,911	100%
General election
Democratic	Joe LaCava	42,613	61.0
Democratic	Will Moore	27,250	39.0
Total votes		69,863	100%

=== District 3 ===
District 3 consists of the communities of Balboa Park, Bankers Hill/Park West, Downtown San Diego, Golden Hill, Hillcrest, Little Italy, Mission Hills, Normal Heights, North Park, Old Town, South Park, and University Heights.

2020 San Diego City Council District 3 election
Primary election
Party	Candidate	Votes	%
Democratic	Stephen Whitburn	14,844	31.1
Democratic	Toni Duran	10,836	22.7
Democratic	Chris Olsen	9,705	20.3
Republican	Michelle Nguyen	8,340	17.5
Democratic	Adrian Kwiatkowski	3,996	8.4
Total votes		47,721	100%
General election
Democratic	Stephen Whitburn	49,119	63.0
Democratic	Toni Duran	28,813	37.0
Total votes		77,932	100%

=== District 5 ===
District 5 consists of the neighborhoods of Black Mountain Ranch, Carmel Mountain Ranch, Miramar, Rancho Bernardo, Rancho Encantada, Rancho Peñasquitos, Sabre Springs, San Pasqual Valley, Scripps Ranch, and Torrey Highlands.

2020 San Diego City Council District 5 election
Primary election
Party	Candidate	Votes	%
Democratic	Marni von Wilpert	18,084	39.8
Republican	Joe Leventhal	16,778	36.9
Democratic	Isaac Wang	8,764	19.3
Republican	Simon Moghadam	1,836	4.0
Total votes		45,462	100%
General election
Democratic	Marni von Wilpert	43,630	53.2
Republican	Joe Leventhal	38,308	46.8
Total votes		81,938	100%

=== District 7 ===
District 7 consists of the neighborhoods of Allied Gardens, Del Cerro, Grantville, Linda Vista, Mission Valley, San Carlos, Serra Mesa, and Tierrasanta.

2020 San Diego City Council District 7 election
Primary election
Party	Candidate	Votes	%
Democratic	Raul Campillo	15,025	35.9
Republican	Noli Zosa	12,783	30.5
Democratic	Wendy Wheatcroft	8,526	20.4
Democratic	Monty McIntyre	5,558	13.3
Total votes		41,892	100%
General election
Democratic	Raul Campillo	40,310	55.0
Republican	Noli Zosa	32,963	45.0
Total votes		73,273	100%

=== District 9 ===
District 9 consists of the communities of Alvarado Estates, City Heights, College Area, College View Estates, El Cerrito, Kensington, Mountain View, Mount Hope, Rolando, Southcrest, and Talmadge.

2020 San Diego City Council District 9 election
Primary election
Party	Candidate	Votes	%
Democratic	Kelvin H. Barrios	7,426	31.6
Democratic	Sean Elo-Rivera	4,819	20.5
Independent	Johnny Lee Dang	3,473	14.8
Republican	Andrew Gade	2,222	9.5
Democratic	Ross Naismith	1,997	8.5
Democratic	Sam Bedwell	1,986	8.5
Democratic	Alex Soto	1,564	6.7
Total votes		23,487	100%
General election
Democratic	Sean Elo-Rivera	26,835	62.7
Democratic	Kelvin H. Barrios	15,990	37.3
Total votes		42,825	100%

=== Council president ===
At their first meeting on December 10, 2020, the newly seated City Council selected Jen Campbell to serve as the Council President on a 5–4 vote. The other four council members supported Monica Montgomery Steppe.

== Ballot measures ==
=== Polling ===
==== Primary election ====
Measure C in the primary was distinct from Measure C in the general election. The first of these did not pass.

Measure C

Poll source	Date(s) administered	Sample size (Note: Key: A – all adults RV – registered voters LV – likely voters V – unclear)	Margin of error	For Measure C	Against Measure C	Undecided
SurveyUSA/KGTV-TV/San Diego Union-Tribune	February 6–8, 2020	527 (LV)	± 5.3%	61%	21%	18%
SurveyUSA/KGTV-TV/San Diego Union-Tribune	January 16–19, 2020	518 (LV)	± 5.2%	51%	27%	22%

On whether to raise taxes to pay for the expansion of the San Diego convention centre (Measure C fit this building)

Poll source	Date(s) administered	Sample size	Margin of error	For this proposal	Against this proposal	Undecided
SurveyUSA/KGTV-TV/San Diego Union-Tribune	September 3–5, 2019	550 (LV)	± 4.9%	50%	34%	15%

==== General election ====
Measure A

Poll source	Date(s) administered	Sample size	Margin of error	For Measure A	Against Measure A	Undecided
SurveyUSA/KGTV-TV/San Diego Union-Tribune	October 1–5, 2020	547 (LV)	± 5.3%	38%	33%	29%
SurveyUSA/KGTV-TV/San Diego Union-Tribune	August 28–31, 2020	517 (LV)	± 5.3%	36%	32%	32%

Measure B

Poll source	Date(s) administered	Sample size	Margin of error	For Measure B	Against Measure B	Undecided
SurveyUSA/KGTV-TV/San Diego Union-Tribune	October 1–5, 2020	547 (LV)	± 5.3%	53%	21%	27%
SurveyUSA/KGTV-TV/San Diego Union-Tribune	August 28–31, 2020	517 (LV)	± 5.3%	55%	19%	26%

Measure C

Poll source	Date(s) administered	Sample size	Margin of error	For Measure C	Against Measure C	Undecided
SurveyUSA/KGTV-TV/San Diego Union-Tribune	October 1–5, 2020	547 (LV)	± 5.3%	39%	14%	47%
SurveyUSA/KGTV-TV/San Diego Union-Tribune	August 28–31, 2020	517 (LV)	± 5.3%	39%	12%	49%

Measure E

Poll source	Date(s) administered	Sample size	Margin of error	For Measure E	Against Measure E	Undecided
SurveyUSA/KGTV-TV/San Diego Union-Tribune	October 1–5, 2020	547 (LV)	± 5.3%	37%	25%	38%
SurveyUSA/KGTV-TV/San Diego Union-Tribune	August 28–31, 2020	517 (LV)	± 5.3%	31%	29%	39%
