= 2028 San Diego mayoral election =

- November 7, 2028
Incumbent Mayor
Todd Gloria
Democratic

The 2028 San Diego mayoral election will be held on November 7, 2028, to elect the mayor of San Diego, California. The primary election will be held on March 7, 2028, after which the two top vote-getting candidates will advance to the general election. Incumbent mayor Todd Gloria is ineligible for re-election due to term limits.

Municipal elections in California are officially non-partisan, although most members do identify a party preference. A two-round system is used for the elections, starting with primaries in March followed by runoff elections in November between the top-two candidates in each race.

== Candidates ==
=== Publicly expressed interest ===
- Raul Campillo, San Diego city councilmember from the 7th district (2020–present)
- Scott Peters, U.S. representative from CA-50 (2023–present) and CA-52 (2013–2023), 2008 candidate for San Diego City Attorney, former president of the San Diego city council (2006–2008) from the 1st district (2000–2008)

=== Potential ===
- David Alvarez, California state assemblymember from the 80th district (2022–present), candidate for mayor of San Diego in the 2013–2014 special election, former San Diego city councilmember from the 8th district (2010–2018)
- Toni Atkins, former president pro tempore of the California State Senate (2018–2024) from the 39th district (2016–2024) and former speaker of the California State Assembly (2012–2016) from the 78th district (2010–2016), former San Diego city councilmember from the 3rd district (2000–2008)
- Carl DeMaio, California state assemblymember from the 75th district (2024–present), 2014 candidate for California's 52nd congressional district, 2020 candidate for California's 50th congressional district, 2012 candidate for mayor of San Diego, former San Diego city councilmember from the 5th district (2008–2012)
- Sean Elo-Rivera, San Diego city councilmember from the 9th district (2020–present), former president of the San Diego city council (2021–2024)
- Lorena Gonzalez, president of the California Labor Federation (2022–present), former California state assemblymember from the 80th district (2013–2022)
- Sara Jacobs, U.S. representative from CA-51 (2023–present) and CA-53 (2021–2023)
- Kent Lee, San Diego city councilmember from the 6th district (2020–present)
- Monica Montgomery Steppe, member of the San Diego County Board of Supervisors from the 4th district (2023–present), former San Diego city councilmember from the 4th district (2018–2023)
- Marni von Wilpert, San Diego city councilmember from the 5th district (2020–present)

== Primary election ==
=== Campaign ===
After declining to run in the 2024 election against Todd Gloria, Democratic congressman and former San Diego city councilmember Scott Peters has publicly expressed interest in running for mayor of San Diego in the 2028 election, as well as city councilmember Raul Campillo. As of November 10, 2026, no candidates have formally announced a bid for mayor of San Diego.
