= 2026 San Diego City Council election =

- November 3, 2026

4 of the 9 seats on the San Diego City Council
	Majority party
Party	Democratic
Seats before	9
Seats after	9
Seat change	Steady
Council President before election
Joe LaCava
Democratic
Elected Council President
TBD

The 2026 San Diego City Council election was held on November 3, 2026, to elect four of the nine members on the San Diego City Council. The primary election was held on June 2, 2026.

Of the two incumbents eligible for re-election, Kent Lee won re-election while Henry Foster III lost re-election to Martha Abraham, becoming the first incumbent councilmember to lose re-election since 2018 and the third since 1992. Term-limited incumbents Jennifer Campbell and Vivian Moreno were succeeded by Nicole Crosby and Antonio Martinez, respectively.

Though municipal elections in California are officially non-partisan, the election resulted in the continuation of a 9-0 Democratic majority on the city council, which had remained unanimously Democratic since 2022.

== Background ==
Seats in San Diego City Council districts 2, 4, 6, and 8 were up for election in 2026. Incumbents Henry Foster III (District 4) and Kent Lee (District 6) sought re-election, while Jennifer Campbell (District 2) and Vivian Moreno (District 8) were ineligible for re-election due to term limits.

Major election issues included budget shortfalls, backlogged street and stormwater infrastructure repairs, rising cost of living, homelessness, police usage of automatic license plate readers through Flock Safety, parking fees, and housing affordability, part of a statewide housing shortage.

== District 2 ==
District 2 consisted of the communities of Clairemont, Midway, Mission Beach, Mission Bay Park, Ocean Beach, Old Town, and Point Loma.

Democratic incumbent Jennifer Campbell was ineligible for re-election due to term limits. Former Coronado mayor Richard Bailey, an independent who left the Republican Party in February 2026, and deputy city attorney Nicole Crosby, a Democrat, defeated five other candidates and advanced from the primary on June 2, 2026. Crosby went on to defeat Bailey in the general election.

=== Candidates ===
==== Advanced to general ====
- Richard Bailey, former mayor of Coronado, California (2016–2024)
- Nicole Crosby, deputy city attorney

==== Eliminated in primary ====
- Josh Coyne, former aide to councilmember Jennifer Campbell
- Mandy Havlik, community activist
- Jacob J. Mitchell, chemist
- Mike Rickey, merchant marine
- Paul Suppa, attorney

==== Disqualified ====
- Michael Blow
- Leisa A. Bockenhauser
- Sandra Kay
- Mark B. Potocki
- Nicole A. Quillin
- Daniel Smiechowski
- Eric Tims

=== Endorsements ===
Richard Bailey

State legislators

- Carl DeMaio, AD-75 (2024–present)

Newspapers

- The San Diego Union-Tribune
Josh Coyne

State legislators

- Catherine Blakespear, SD-38 (2022–present)
- Chris Ward, AD-78 (2020–present)

Labor unions

- AFSCME Local 127 (dual endorsed with Nicole Crosby)
Nicole Crosby

Organizations

- San Diego Democrats for Equality

Labor unions

- AFSCME Local 127 (dual endorsed with Josh Coyne)

Political parties

- California Working Families Party
- San Diego County Democratic Party

Newspapers

- OB Rag
Mandy Havlik

Local officials

- Ed Harris, former San Diego city councilmember from the 2nd district (2014)

Newspapers

- ~~OB Rag~~ (switched to Crosby in the general election)
Mike Rickey

Political parties

- San Diego Libertarian Party

=== Results ===
2026 San Diego City Council District 2 election
Primary election
Party	Candidate	Votes	%
Independent (Note: During his tenure on the Coronado city council and as mayor of Coronado, Bailey was a registered Republican. He changed his voter registration from Republican to no party preference on February 20, 2026.)	Richard Bailey	14,800	34.84
Democratic	Nicole Crosby	14,325	33.72
Democratic	Josh Coyne	5,630	13.25
Democratic	Mandy Havlik	4,759	11.20
Libertarian	Mike Rickey	1,436	3.38
Democratic	Jacob J. Mitchell	824	1.94
Independent	Paul Suppa	698	1.66
Total votes		42,477	100.0
General election
Democratic	Nicole Crosby	19,694	54.19
Independent	Richard Bailey	16,650	45.81
Total votes		36,344	100.0

== District 4 ==
District 4 consisted of the communities of Alta Vista, Broadway Heights, Chollas View, Emerald Hills, Encanto, Greater Skyline Hills, Jamacha, Lincoln Park, Lomita Village, North Bay Terrace, Oak Park, O'Farrell, Paradise Hills, Redwood Village, Rolando Park, South Bay Terrace, Valencia Park, and Webster.

Incumbent Henry Foster III and ICU nurse Martha Abraham, both Democrats, defeated one other candidate and advanced from the primary on June 2, 2026. Abraham went on to defeat Foster in the general election.

=== Candidates ===
==== Advanced to general ====
- Martha Abraham, ICU nurse
- Henry L. Foster III, San Diego city councilmember from the 4th district (2023–present)

==== Eliminated in primary ====
- Johnny Lee Dang, administrative assistant

==== Disqualified ====
- Mykel Gadson
- Erik Ibarra
- Tylisa D. Suseberry

==== Withdrawn ====
- Mathew Gordon, former aide to Councilmember Myrtle Cole

=== Endorsements ===
Martha Abraham

Organizations

- Sierra Club San Diego

Labor unions

- IAFF Local 145
- United Nurses Associations of California

Newspapers

- La Prensa
- San Diego Voice & Viewpoint
Johnny Lee Dang

Political parties

- San Diego County Republican Party
Henry Foster III

Labor unions

- AFSCME Local 127
- ~~IAFF Local 145~~ (switched to Abraham in the general election)

Political parties

- California Working Families Party
- San Diego County Democratic Party

Newspapers

- The San Diego Union-Tribune

=== Results ===
2026 San Diego City Council District 4 election
Primary election
Party	Candidate	Votes	%
Democratic	Henry Foster III (incumbent)	9,138	40.73
Democratic	Martha Abraham	9,126	40.67
Independent	Johnny Lee Dang	4,174	18.60
Total votes		22,438	100.0
General election
Democratic	Martha Abraham	12,258	53.46
Democratic	Henry Foster III (incumbent)	10,673	46.54
Total votes		22,931	100.0

== District 6 ==
District 6 consisted of the communities of Clairemont Mesa, Kearny Mesa, Mira Mesa, Mission Valley, North Clairemont, and Rancho Peñasquitos.

Democratic incumbent Kent Lee and Republican businessman Mark Powell advanced from the primary on June 2, 2026. Lee went on to defeat Powell in the general election.

=== Candidates ===
==== Advanced to general ====
- Kent F. Lee, San Diego city councilmember from the 6th district (2022–present)
- Mark Powell, businessman

==== Disqualified ====
- Bea Bautista
- Jane L. Glasson

=== Endorsements ===
Kent Lee

Labor unions

- AFSCME Local 127

Political parties

- San Diego County Democratic Party
Mark Powell

State legislators

- Carl DeMaio, AD-75 (2024–present)

Political parties

- San Diego County Republican Party

Newspapers

- The San Diego Union-Tribune

=== Results ===
2026 San Diego City Council District 6 election
Primary election
Party	Candidate	Votes	%
Democratic	Kent Lee (incumbent)	17,964	58.79
Republican	Mark Powell	12,591	41.21
Total votes		30,555	100.0
General election
Democratic	Kent Lee (incumbent)	16,104	59.63
Republican	Mark Powell	10,904	40.37
Total votes		27,008	100.0

== District 8 ==
District 8 consisted of the southern communities of San Diego and those along the Mexico–United States border, including the communities of Barrio Logan, Egger Highlands, Grant Hill, Logan Heights, Memorial, Nestor, Ocean View Hills, Otay Mesa West, Otay Mesa East, San Ysidro, Sherman Heights, Stockton, and Tijuana River Valley.

Democratic incumbent Vivian Moreno was ineligible for re-election due to term limits. Four candidates qualified to run for the June 2, 2026 primary, in addition to two write-in candidates.

Antonio Martinez, a member of the San Ysidro School District Board of Education, and Gerardo Ramirez, chief of staff to councilmember Vivian Moreno, both Democrats, defeated four other candidates and advanced from the primary on June 2, 2026. Martinez went on to defeat Ramirez in the general election.

=== Candidates ===
==== Advanced to general ====
- Antonio Martinez, member of the San Ysidro School District Board of Education (2012–present)
- Gerardo Ramirez, chief of staff to San Diego city councilmember Vivian Moreno

==== Eliminated in primary ====
- Venus Molina, chief of staff to San Diego city councilmember Jennifer Campbell
- Miguel M. Ochoa (write-in)
- Kenia A. Peraza (write-in)
- Rafael Perez, educator

==== Disqualified ====
- Omar Araiza
- Francisco A. Mayoral Munoz

=== Endorsements ===
Rafael Perez

Political parties

- California Working Families Party
Venus Molina

Labor unions

- AFSCME Local 127 (dual endorsed with Gerardo Ramirez)
Kenia Peraza (write-in)

State legislators

- Carl DeMaio, AD-75 (2024–present)
Gerardo Ramirez

State legislators

- David Alvarez, AD-80 (2022–present)

Local officials

- Vivian Moreno, San Diego city councilmember from the 8th district (2018–present)

Labor unions

- AFSCME Local 127 (dual endorsed with Venus Molina)

Newspapers

- The San Diego Union-Tribune

=== Results ===
2026 San Diego City Council District 8 election
Primary election
Party	Candidate	Votes	%
Democratic	Antonio Martinez	5,375	28.07
Democratic	Gerardo Ramirez	4,636	24.21
Democratic	Venus Molina	4,334	22.63
Democratic	Rafael Perez	3,536	18.46
Independent	Kenia Peraza (write-in)	1,256	6.56
Independent	Mike Ochoa (write-in)	13	0.07
Total votes		19,150	100.0
General election
Democratic	Antonio Martinez	10,946	56.85
Democratic	Gerardo Ramirez	8,307	43.15
Total votes		19,253	100.0

== Council president ==
Following the election, the city council will select the president of the city council. The current council president is Joe LaCava, serving since 2025.
