= Georgette Gómez =

American politician (born 1975)

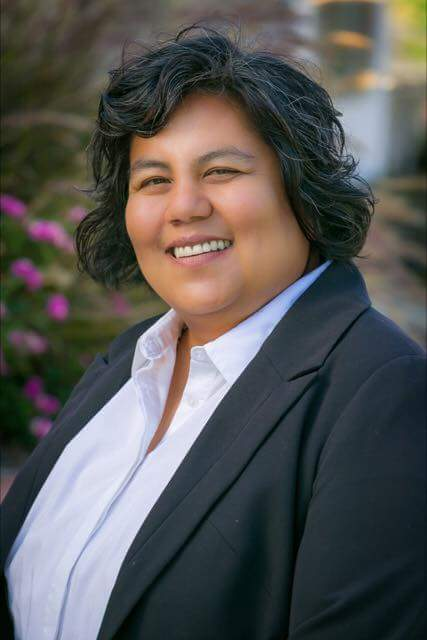

President of the San Diego City Council
- In office December 10, 2018 – December 10, 2020
- Preceded by: Myrtle Cole
- Succeeded by: Jennifer Campbell

Member of the San Diego City Council from the 9th district
- In office December 12, 2016 – December 10, 2020
- Preceded by: Marti Emerald
- Succeeded by: Sean Elo-Rivera

Personal details
- Born: November 3, 1975 (age 50) San Diego, California, U.S.
- Party: Democratic
- Education: San Diego State University (BA)
- Website: Government website

Georgette Gómez (born November 3, 1975) is an American politician and community activist who served as president of the San Diego City Council from 2018 to 2020. A member of the Democratic Party, she served as a member of the city council from 2016 to 2020, representing District 9.

Gómez was an unsuccessful candidate for California's 53rd congressional district in the 2020 elections and for California's 80th State Assembly district in the 2022 special election following the resignation of Assemblymember Lorena Gonzalez.

== Early life and education ==
Gómez was born in San Diego to working-class immigrants. She was raised in Barrio Logan. Gómez attended Canyon Hills High School and later graduated from San Diego State University, where she studied environmental and natural resource geography.

== Career ==
=== San Diego City Council ===
Gómez was a candidate for the ninth district of the San Diego City Council in the 2016 San Diego City Council election after incumbent Marti Emerald opted not to seek reelection. The ninth district includes the neighborhoods of Alvarado Estates, City Heights, College Area, College View Estates, El Cerrito, Kensington, Mountain View, Mt. Hope, Rolando, Southcrest, and Talmadge. In the June 2016 primary, Gómez came in second to Ricardo Flores, Emerald's chief of staff. Since no candidate received a majority of the votes in the primary, a runoff election was held in November 2016 between Flores and Gómez. Gómez was then elected to the City Council in November with a majority of the votes.

On December 10, 2018, the city council voted unanimously to appoint Gómez to be the council president. In this role, she automatically gained a seat on the board of directors of the San Diego Association of Governments. She also served as the chairwoman of the San Diego Metropolitan Transit System from January 2018 to October 2019. Under Gómez, the city moved to create a community choice energy agency called San Diego Community Power (as an alternative to SDG&E), a strategy which makes up half of the emissions reductions in the San Diego Climate Action Plan.

=== 2020 congressional election ===
In September 2019, Gómez announced her candidacy in the 2020 elections to represent California's 53rd congressional district in the United States House of Representatives. Gómez and Sara Jacobs advanced to the November 2020 runoff election. In the runoff, Gomez campaigned as both a progressive and a strong supporter of Israel; she was endorsed by Democratic Majority for Israel, which caused her to lose support from the Justice Democrats. Jacobs beat Gomez 59.5%-40.5% in the November 2020 general election.

In June 2020, Gómez expressed support for a petition calling for a name change of the Andrew Jackson Federal Post Office in her district due to his history of owning slaves and his part in the forced displacement of Native Americans during the Trail of Tears.

On October 8, 2020, the San Diego Union Tribune reported that Gómez failed to pay taxes on her city council salary in 2017. Gómez admitted the mistake and amended her filing.

=== 2022 California's 80th Assembly district election ===
Gómez announced her candidacy to represent California's 80th Assembly District on January 3, 2022; the same day Lorena Gonzalez announced her resignation. In the special election on April 5, 2022, no candidate received a majority of the votes. Gómez and fellow Democrat David Alvarez advanced to a runoff election to be held June 7, 2022. In September 2022, she withdrew from the race.

Endorsements

Organizations

- California Democratic Party
- California Nurses Association
- California Federation of Teachers
- Sierra Club California
- SEIU California
- Equality California
- Working Families Party

Individuals

- Lorena Gonzalez
- Todd Gloria, mayor of San Diego
- Nora Vargas, San Diego Board of Supervisors
- Nathan Fletcher, San Diego Board of Supervisors
- Chris Ward
- Tasha Boerner Horvath
- Eloise Gómez Reyes

=== Election results ===
California's 80th State Assembly district special election, 2022 Vacancy resulting from the resignation of Lorena Gonzalez
Primary election
| Party | Candidate | Votes | % |
|---|---|---|---|
| Democratic | David Alvarez | 15,132 | 37.8 |
| Democratic | Georgette Gómez | 15,300 | 38.2 |
| Republican | Lincoln Pickard | 9,625 | 24.0 |
| Total votes | | 40,057 | 100.0 |
General election
| Democratic | David Alvarez | 26,482 | 54.3 |
| Democratic | Georgette Gómez | 22,297 | 45.7 |
| Total votes | | 48,779 | 100.0 |
| Democratic hold | | | |

2020 United States House of Representatives elections in California
Primary election
| Party | Candidate | Votes | % |
|---|---|---|---|
| Democratic | Sara Jacobs | 58,312 | 29.1 |
| Democratic | Georgette Gómez | 39,962 | 20.0 |
| Republican | Chris Stoddard | 25,962 | 13.0 |
| Democratic | Janessa Goldbeck | 17,041 | 8.5 |
| Republican | Famela Ramos | 15,005 | 7.5 |
| Republican | Michael Patrick Oristian | 14,807 | 7.4 |
| Democratic | Tom Wong | 7,265 | 3.6 |
| Democratic | Annette Meza | 4,446 | 2.2 |
| Democratic | Joseph R. Fountain | 4,041 | 2.0 |
| Democratic | Jose Caballero | 3,226 | 1.6 |
| Democratic | Joaquín Vazquez | 3,078 | 1.5 |
| Democratic | John Brooks | 2,820 | 1.4 |
| No party preference | Fernando Garcia | 1,832 | 0.9 |
| Democratic | Suzette Santori | 1,625 | 0.8 |
| Democratic | Eric Roger Kutner | 734 | 0.4 |
| Total votes | | 200,156 | 100.0 |
General election
| Democratic | Sara Jacobs | 192,897 | 59.5 |
| Democratic | Georgette Gómez | 131,349 | 40.5 |
| Total votes | | 324,246 | 100.0 |

San Diego City Council District 9 election, 2016
Primary election
| Party | Candidate | Votes | % |
|---|---|---|---|
| Democratic | Ricardo Flores | 7,348 | 34% |
| Democratic | Georgette Gómez | 6,567 | 31% |
| Democratic | Sarah Saez | 5,023 | 23% |
| Democratic | Araceli Martinez | 2,589 | 12% |
| Total votes | | 21,527 | 100% |
General election
| Democratic | Georgette Gómez | 20,075 | 55% |
| Democratic | Ricardo Flores | 16,583 | 45% |
| Total votes | | 36,658 | 100% |

== Personal life ==
Gómez resides in the Azalea Park neighborhood within City Heights.

Civic offices
| Preceded by Marti Emerald | Member of the San Diego City Council from the 9th district 2016–present | Incumbent |
| Preceded by Myrtle Cole | President of the San Diego City Council; 2018–present | Incumbent |
