= Stephen Whitburn =

American politician (born 1964)

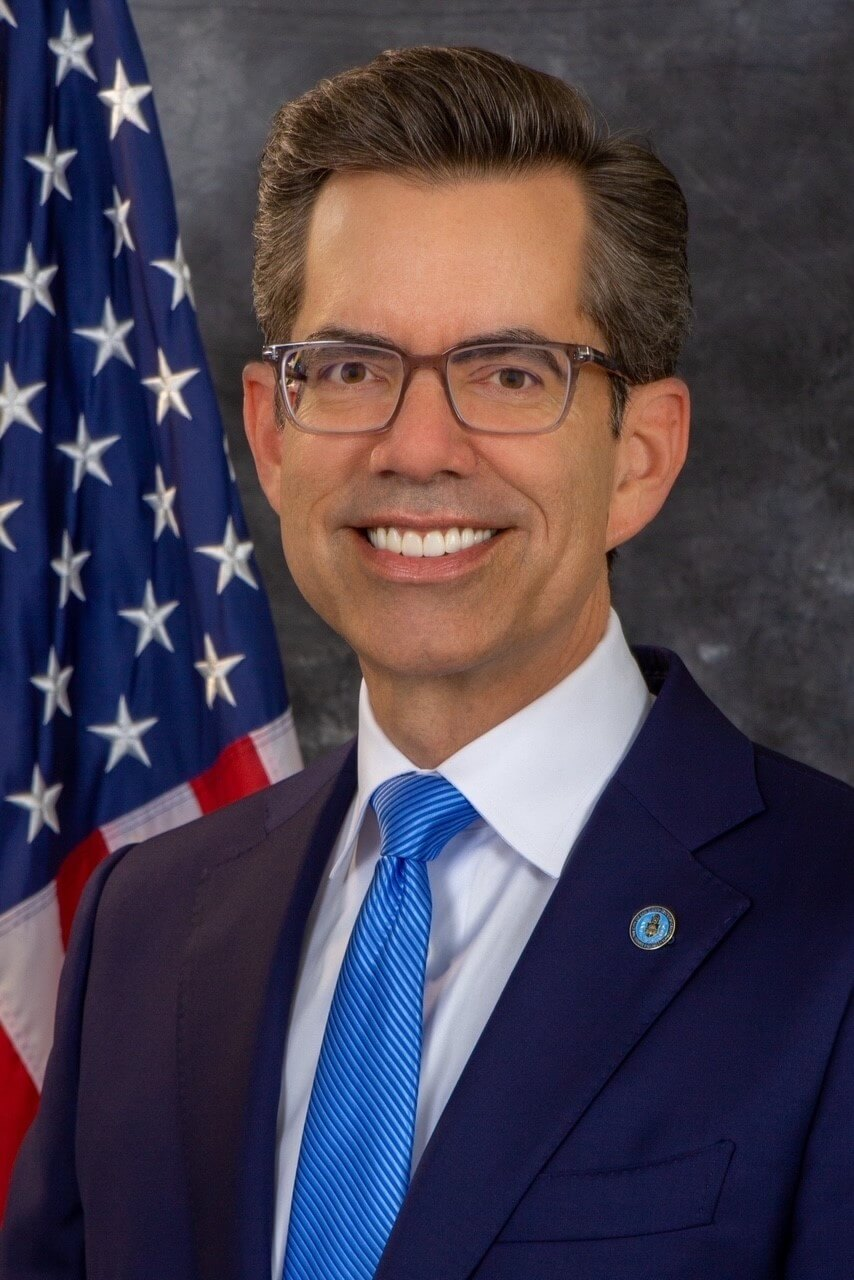

President Pro Tempore of the San Diego City Council
- In office December 10, 2020 – December 6, 2021
- Mayor: Todd Gloria
- Council President: Jennifer Campbell
- Preceded by: Barbara Bry
- Succeeded by: Monica Montgomery Steppe

Member of the San Diego City Council from the 3rd district
- Incumbent
- Assumed office December 10, 2020
- Mayor: Todd Gloria
- Preceded by: Chris Ward

Personal details
- Born: 1964 (age 61–62) West Germany
- Party: Democratic
- Education: University of Wisconsin–Madison (BA)

Stephen Whitburn (born c. 1964) is an American politician, activist, and former journalist serving as a member of the San Diego City Council since 2020, representing District 3. A member of the Democratic Party, he served as president pro tempore of the city council from 2020 to 2021 under council president Jennifer Campbell.

Whitburn represents the communities of Balboa Park, Bankers Hill, Downtown, Golden Hill, Hillcrest, Little Italy, Middletown, Mission Hills, Mission Valley West, North Park, South Park, and University Heights.

== Early life and career ==
Whitburn was born in West Germany and grew up in multiple states, including upstate New York. He earned a Bachelor of Arts degree in Spanish and Latin American studies from the University of Wisconsin–Madison.

Whitburn started working for a radio station as a news reporter in Madison, Wisconsin for nine years before accepting a position with a radio station in San Diego. He then worked as a public affairs manager for the American Red Cross, later taking director roles at San Diego Pride and the Southern California chapter of the American Cancer Society.

== Political career ==
Whitburn served as the president of the San Diego Democratic Club from 2004 to 2007 and as vice chair of the North Park Planning Committee from 2006 to 2010.

In 2008, he ran for the District 3 seat on the San Diego City Council vacated by term-limited incumbent Toni Atkins. He came in second in the June primary behind fellow Democrat Todd Gloria, a staffer for Congresswoman Susan Davis. Gloria went on to defeat Whitburn in the general election with 54.6% of the vote.

After losing the election, Whitburn served as vice chair of the City of San Diego’s medical marijuana task force from 2009 to 2010. In 2010, Whitburn ran for the 4th supervisorial district on the San Diego County Board of Supervisors, seeking to unseat Republican incumbent Ron Roberts. He would have been the first openly gay member of the board of supervisors if elected. Roberts and Whitburn advanced from the primary with 47.3% and 22.3% of the vote, respectively. Roberts went on to defeat Whitburn in the general election.

=== San Diego City Council ===
==== Elections ====
In 2020, Whitburn ran for the District 3 seat on the San Diego City Council vacated by Chris Ward, who ran to become a member of the California State Assembly representing the 78th district. During the campaign, he was supported by former San Diego city councilmember Donna Frye, then-state assemblymember Lorena Gonzalez, and the San Diego Gay and Lesbian News. He finished first in the nonpartisan primary election with 31.1% of the vote before defeating fellow Democrat Toni Duran in the general election with 63% of the vote.

He ran for re-election in 2024, advancing from the primary election with 52.4% of the vote. During the campaign, he expressed support for income-restricted housing and streamlined regulations to lower costs for housing developers. He was supported by the San Diego County Democratic Party, the San Diego and Imperial Counties Labor Council AFL-CIO, and the YIMBY Democrats of San Diego. He went on to defeat public interest attorney and fellow Democrat Coleen Cusack with 57.5% of the vote in the November 2024 general election.

==== Tenure ====
During his first term, Whitburn served as president pro tempore of the city council from 2020 to 2021 under council president Jennifer Campbell and was described as an ally of mayor Todd Gloria. He served on the San Diego Metropolitan Transit System board of directors as vice chair in 2023 before becoming chair later that year following the resignation of then-chair Nathan Fletcher.

Whitburn introduced a city council ordinance in 2023 that allowed police to remove homeless encampments on public property if city shelter beds were available, which passed in a 5–4 vote. The ordinance became a model for a statewide encampment ban bill that was introduced in the California State Senate the following year.

During his second term, Whitburn was reelected as chair of the San Diego Metropolitan Transit System in 2025. He voted against a 2025 proposal to charge for parking at Balboa Park, and called for a repeal of the program after it was passed by the city council in a 6–3 vote. In 2026, Whitburn negotiated a settlement to a lawsuit against the city which resulted in reduced trash collection fees and the repeal of paid parking at Balboa Park by January 1, 2027. The settlement was then passed by the council in a 9–0 vote.

== Electoral history ==
2008 San Diego City Council District 3 election
Primary election
Party	Candidate	Votes	%
Democratic	Todd Gloria	9,288	40.64
Democratic	Stephen Whitburn	6,543	28.63
Democratic	John Hartley	4,018	17.58
Nonpartisan	Paul Broadway	1,428	6.25
Nonpartisan	Robert E. Lee	840	3.68
Nonpartisan	James Hartline	739	3.23
Total votes		22,856	100.0
General election
Democratic	Todd Gloria	27,922	54.60
Democratic	Stephen Whitburn	23,191	45.40
Total votes		51,398	100.0
Democratic hold			

2010 San Diego County Board of Supervisors District 4 election
Primary election
Party	Candidate	Votes	%
Republican	Ron Roberts (incumbent)	38,522	47.4
Democratic	Stephen Whitburn	18,124	22.3
Democratic	Shelia L. Jackson	14,689	18.1
Democratic	Margaret Moody	6,209	7.6
Democratic	Juan Del Rio	3,530	8.4
Total votes		81,282	100.0
General election
Republican	Ron Roberts	78,541	56.7
Democratic	Stephen Whitburn	59,609	43.0
Total votes		138,515	100.0
Republican hold			

2020 San Diego City Council District 3 election
Primary election
Party	Candidate	Votes	%
Democratic	Stephen Whitburn	14,844	31.1
Democratic	Toni Duran	10,836	22.7
Democratic	Chris Olsen	9,705	20.3
Republican	Michelle Nguyen	8,340	17.5
Democratic	Adrian Kwiatkowski	3,996	8.4
Total votes		47,721	100.0
General election
Democratic	Stephen Whitburn	49,119	63.0
Democratic	Toni Duran	28,813	37.0
Total votes		77,932	100.0
Democratic hold			

2024 San Diego City Council District 3 election
Primary election
Party	Candidate	Votes	%
Democratic	Stephen Whitburn (incumbent)	17,033	52.4
Democratic	Coleen Cusack	6,811	20.9
Democratic	Kate Callen	5,417	16.7
Republican	Ellis T. California Jones III	3,254	10.0
Total votes		32,515	100.0
General election
Democratic	Stephen Whitburn	38,344	57.5
Democratic	Coleen Cusack	28,303	42.5
Total votes		66,647	100.0
Democratic hold			
