= Richard Bailey (politician) =

American politician

- Bailey while mayor of Coronado

Mayor of Coronado
- In office December 2016 – December 2024
- Preceded by: Casey Tanaka
- Succeeded by: John Duncan

Personal details
- Party: Republican (before 2026); Independent (2026–present)
- Education: California Polytechnic State University, San Luis Obispo (BS); University of North Dakota (MS)

Richard Bailey is an American politician, businessman, and educator who served as the 51st mayor of Coronado, California from 2016 to 2024. A political independent who left the Republican Party in 2026, he previously served on the Coronado city council from 2012 to 2016.

Bailey is a candidate for the District 2 seat on the San Diego City Council in the 2026 election.

== Early life and education ==
Bailey was raised in La Mesa, California. He attended California Polytechnic State University, San Luis Obispo, graduating with a Bachelor of Science degree in business finance. He later completed a Master of Science in applied economics from the University of North Dakota.

== Career ==
Following his undergraduate studies, Bailey briefly worked in San Francisco before returning to San Diego county during the 2008 financial crisis. He subsequently worked in corporate aerospace finance for United Technologies and in manufacturing, consulting, and private business ownership. In January 2020, Bailey was appointed as an adjunct professor of economics at the University of San Diego Knauss School of Business, teaching macroeconomics and microeconomics.

== Political career ==
=== Coronado City Council (2012–2016) ===
Bailey entered public office in 2012 when he was elected to the Coronado City Council.

=== Mayor of Coronado (2016–2024) ===
In 2016, Bailey ran for mayor of Coronado to succeed Casey Tanaka, who was ineligible for reelection due to term limits. Bailey won the election, becoming the youngest individual elected mayor in the city's history at 30 years of age. He won re-election to a second four-year term in 2020, securing 99.16% of the vote in an election where he ran largely unopposed. Due to municipal term limits, Bailey did not seek a third mayoral term in 2024 and was succeeded by Councilmember John Duncan.

Following his mayoral tenure, Bailey moved to the Point Loma neighborhood of San Diego and left the Republican Party in February 2026.

=== San Diego City Council ===
In 2026, Bailey ran for the District 2 seat on the San Diego City Council vacated by Jennifer Campbell, who was ineligible for reelection due to term limits. During the campaign, he was supported by state assemblymember Carl DeMaio, former San Diego mayoral candidate Larry Turner, and the San Diego Union-Tribune. He finished first in the nonpartisan primary election with 34.8% of the vote. He will face Democratic deputy city attorney Nicole Crosby in the November general election.

== Personal life ==
Bailey has made two attempts to summit Mount Everest, both involving severe medical complications.

In May 2023, his first summit attempt was aborted after he contracted a severe lung infection during rotation climbs at high altitude. He was evacuated by helicopter to Kathmandu.

On May 20, 2024, Bailey successfully reached the summit via the Southeast Ridge route. During the final ascent, he contracted gastrointestinal and respiratory infections, causing severe weakness and dehydration. On the descent, weather conditions deteriorated into a whiteout, and freezing temperatures obscured his vision. His descent was significantly delayed due to his physical condition, but he reached safety after weathering a 28-hour storm at Camp 1.
