= Torrey Hills, San Diego =

- Community of San Diego
- Torrey Hills
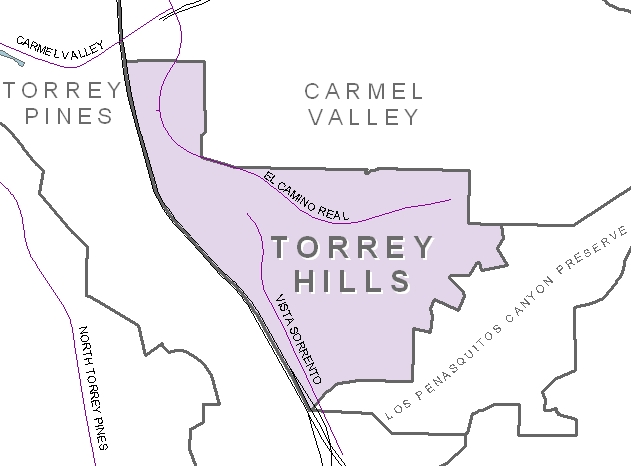
- Torrey Hills boundaries and surrounding communities

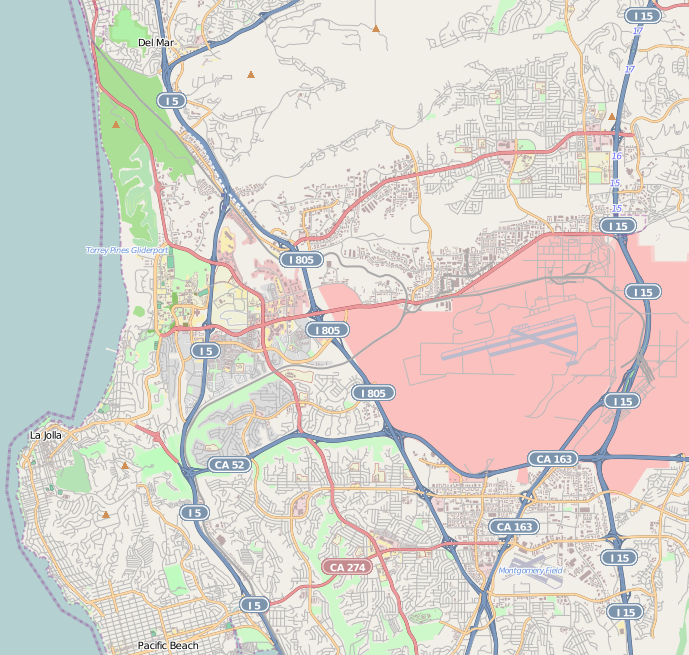
- Location within Northwestern San Diego
- Coordinates: 32°54′40.54″N 117°13′33.92″W
- Country: United States of America
- State: California
- County: San Diego
- City: San Diego

Government
  - Type: CA District 49: Darrell Issa

Torrey Hills is a community of 784 acres (317 ha) in northern San Diego, California, United States. Torrey Hills is a part of District 1 which is represented by Councilmember Joe LaCava on the San Diego City Council.

== Geography ==
Torrey Hills is bordered to the north by State Route 56 and Carmel Valley, to the northeast by Carmel Valley, to the south and southeast by Los Peñasquitos Canyon and Mira Mesa, and to the west by Interstate 5.

== History ==
Before European contact, Torrey Hills was on a prehistoric trade route between the Kumeyaay trade village of Ystagua in Sorrento Valley and Ahwel-Awa in San Dieguito on the way to the Payómkawichum tribe in the north, which was adopted to become part of the El Camino Real under the Spanish.

In 1979 when Carmel Valley was being planned, the city had conducted studies on the Los Peñasquitos Canyon Preserve as an open space park, but had not determined the boundary of the park. The city then designated Sorrento Hills (now Torrey Hills) as Future Urbanizing on the General Plan.

In February 1980, Genstar-Peñasquitos (now AG Land Associates, LLC) dedicated a total of 1,806 acres (731 ha) of Los Peñasquitos Canyon to the city. This created a border for the preserve. As a result, a community planning program was initiated, and the original plan area was transferred from Future Urbanizing to Planned Urbanizing on the General Plan, excluding 178 acres (72 ha) adjacent to the Sorrento Hills community planning area, which was designated as Future Urbanizing.

On November 4, 1986, San Diego voters approved a transfer of 166 acres (67 ha) of government-owned land on the western boundary of Los Peñasquitos Canyon Preserve located adjacent to Interstate 5 to a private landholder in exchange for 288 acres (117 ha) of land adjacent to the Los Peñasquitos Canyon preserve, north of the area referred to as "The Falls". Between the 166-acre (67 ha) parcel and Interstate 5, 12 acres (4.9 ha) additional were incorporated into the ballot measure, which in total provided an additional 178 acres (0.72 km^{2}) to Sorrento Hills. The ballot resulted in the city designating Sorrento Hills as Planned Urbanizing.

In September 2001, the Sorrento Hills Community Planning Board voted to change the name of the community to Torrey Hills. In early 2002, the San Diego City Council initiated a plan amendment to formally change the community name. Despite this, the then superintendent of Del Mar Union School District insisted that the new elementary school, being built down the street from Torrey Hills Park, be called Sorrento Hills Elementary, despite the strong objections from parents in the neighborhood. The name of the school was eventually changed to Torrey Hills Elementary upon completion in 2002.

In 2005, the Vons-anchored Torrey Hills Center retail complex was completed, serving commercial uses along Carmel Mountain Road.

In June 2007, a cigarette-related fire destroyed a Hilton Garden Inn that was under construction in Torrey Hills, resulting in the total loss of the structure and prompting the evacuation of nearby residents and guests at a neighboring Homewood Suites. The incident temporarily halted development at the site. Construction later resumed, and the hotel was rebuilt and opened in 2008 as the Hilton Garden Inn San Diego Del Mar.

== Education ==
One of the schools in the community is Torrey Hills Elementary School, a high-achieving elementary school, one of eight schools in the Del Mar Union School District. It offers a curriculum that includes music, art, technology, and a science lab. The school includes kindergarten through 6th grade, and has an active after school program organized by the Del Mar Union School District. The Torrey Hills colors are black and red, and their mascot is the Hawk.

Those who live north of Carmel Mountain Road and east of El Camino Real may have to option to attend Ocean Air Elementary School.

Students from Torrey Hills Elementary usually attend Carmel Valley Middle School or Pacific Trails Middle School in Carmel Valley or Earl Warren in Solana Beach. After middle school, most students attend Torrey Pines High School or Canyon Crest Academy (the latter referred to as "CCA", both being public schools).
