= Talmadge, California =

Talmadge, California may refer to:

- Talmadge, San Diego, a neighborhood
- Talmage, California in Mendocino County
