= Jennifer Campbell =

Jennifer Campbell may refer to:

- Jennifer Campbell (politician)
- Jennifer Campbell (actress)
