= San Diego City Council =

Legislative branch of the City of San Diego, California

Coordinates: 32.71691°N 117.16297°W

Type
- Type: Unicameral
- Term limits: 2 Terms

Leadership
- President: Joe LaCava, Democratic since December 10, 2024
- President Pro Tempore: Kent Lee, Democratic since December 17, 2024

Structure
- Seats: 9
- Political groups: Officially nonpartisan Majority (9): Democratic (9)
- Length of term: 4 Years

Elections
- Voting system: Single-member districts
- Last election: November 3, 2026
- Next election: November 7, 2028

Meeting place
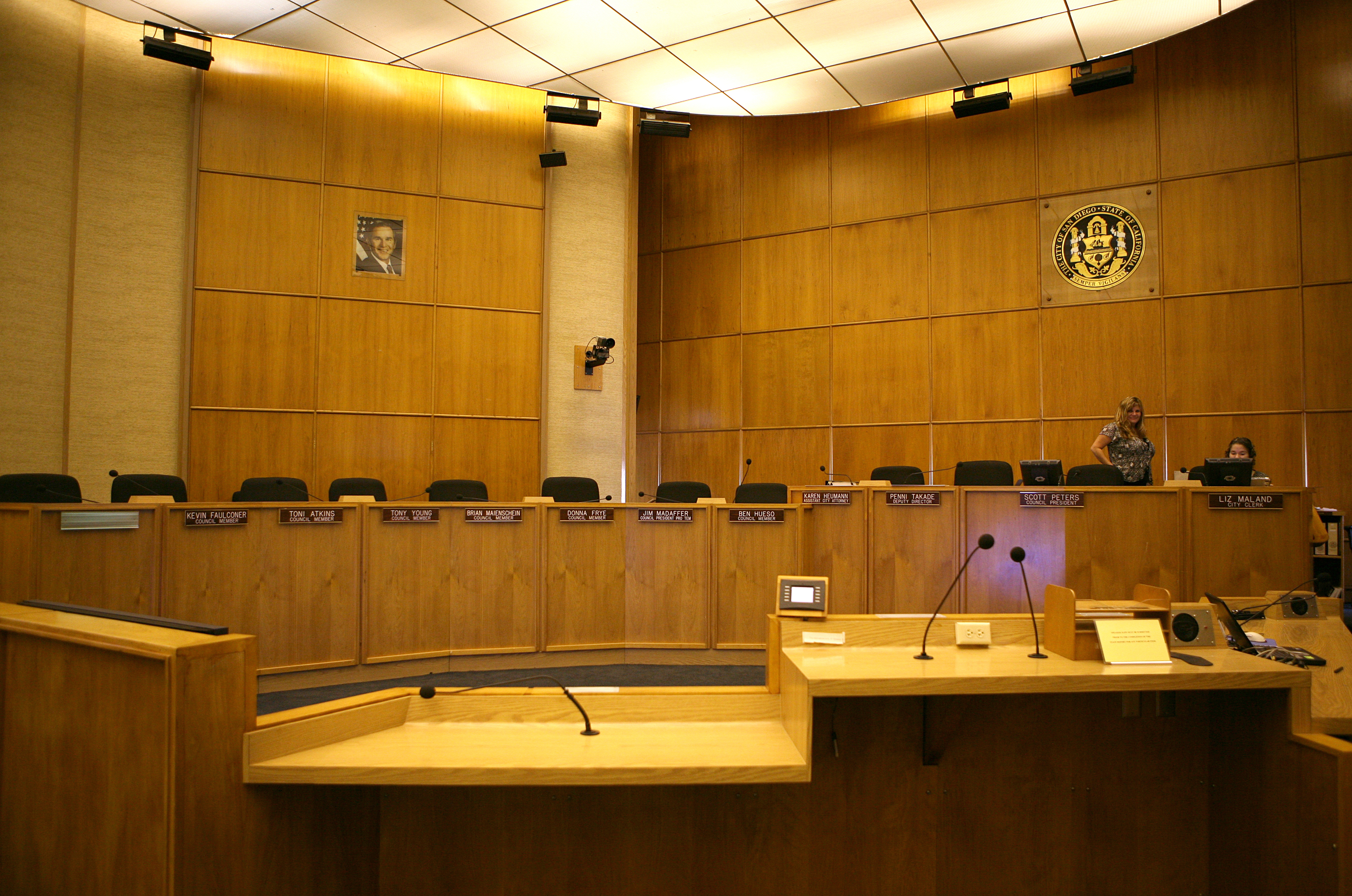
- San Diego City Hall 202 C St # 10, San Diego, CA

Website
- Official Website

The San Diego City Council is the legislative branch of government for the City of San Diego. The city council was first established in San Diego in 1850. The council is part of a strong mayor system with a separately elected mayor who acts as the executive of the city. There are currently nine members of the council. City council members serve a four-year term and are limited to two successive terms.

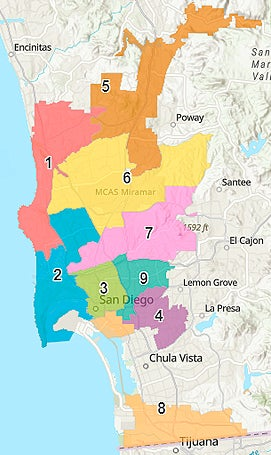
Map of City of San Diego City Council districts based on the 2020 Census.

== History ==
San Diego was first incorporated as a city government with a common council on March 27, 1850. However, the city went bankrupt in 1852 and the council was replaced by a board of trustees. A new charter was adopted in 1889 reestablishing a common council under the strong mayor form of government. The common council consisted of two houses, a nine-member board of aldermen and an eighteen-member board of delegates. The council was consolidated into one nine-member house in 1905 and reduced to a five-member commission in 1909.

In 1931 a new charter established a council–manager government. This charter is still in effect today with modifications. The new charter included a seven-member council. Six council members were nominated in districts and voted on citywide. The mayor was the leader of the council and elected citywide. This form of government was modified over time by the electorate. Notable changes include expanding the council to eight districts in 1963, making the council a full-time job in 1974, electing council members by district in 1988, and establishing term limits in 1992.

In 2005 two city council members, Ralph Inzunza and Deputy Mayor Michael Zucchet – who briefly took over as acting mayor when Murphy resigned – were convicted of extortion, wire fraud, and conspiracy to commit wire fraud for taking campaign contributions from a strip club owner and his associates, allegedly in exchange for trying to repeal the city's "no touch" laws at strip clubs. Both subsequently resigned. Inzunza was sentenced to 21 months in prison. In 2009, a judge acquitted Zucchet on seven out of the nine counts against him, and granted his petition for a new trial on the other two charges; the remaining charges were eventually dropped.

In 2006 the city's form of government changed back to a strong mayor system. The change was made for a 5-year trial period by a citywide vote in 2004 and was made permanent by another vote of the electorate in June 2010. The mayor of San Diego is, in effect, the chief executive officer of the city, while the council is the legislative body. Since December 2012 there have been nine members of the council, expanded from eight under the terms of a city ballot measure passed in June 2010.

== Duties and powers ==
As members of the legislative branch of the City of San Diego, the city council has the authority to introduce and pass the ordinances and resolutions that make up the city's ruling documents. Each council member has the right to vote on all questions brought before the city council. All council actions require an affirmative vote of five council members to pass unless a greater number is required by other superseding law. With some exceptions, the mayor has the right to veto legislation passed by the council. This veto can be overridden by an affirmative vote of six members of the city council.

The city council has the right to determine its own rules and order of business for council meetings. This includes the right to establish and modify council committees, advisory boards, and citizen committees. Under current rules, a council president and president pro tempore are elected each year to serve as the presiding officers of the city council.

The salary for council members was set at $75,386 in 2003. In March 2012, the city's Salary Setting Commission proposed that council members be paid $175,000, but the city council unanimously rejected the recommendation. In November 2018, voters passed Measure L which ties future City Council salaries to those of Superior Court judges. As of June 2023, the council member salary is $173,000.

== Elections ==
Each city council member is elected from a single-member district. Elections follow a two-round system. The first round of the election is called the primary election. The top-two candidates in the primary election advance to a runoff election, called the general election. Write-in candidates are only allowed to contest the primary election and are not allowed in the general election. Council members are elected to four-year terms, with a two-term limit. City council seats are officially non-partisan under California state law, although most members do identify a party preference.

The most recent general election was held in 2026 for districts 2, 4, 6, and 8; the next election for these seats will be held in 2030. General elections for districts 1, 3, 5, 7, and 9 were last held in 2024; the next election for these seats will be held in 2028.

== Current Council ==
Members of the City Council are elected from 9 single-member districts and include Councilmembers Joe LaCava, Jennifer Campbell, Stephen Whitburn, Henry L. Foster III, Marni von Wilpert, Kent Lee, Raul Campillo, Vivian Moreno, and Sean Elo-Rivera. The candidates for the 2024-2026 City Council were elected on November 5, 2024 and were sworn in on December 10, 2024.

District	Councilmember	Neighborhoods and Areas Represented	Party (officially nonpartisan)
1	Joe LaCava (Council President)	Carmel Valley, Del Mar Mesa, La Jolla, Pacific Beach, Pacific Highlands Ranch, Torrey Hills, Torrey Pines, and parts of University City.	Democratic
2	Jennifer Campbell	Clairemont, Midway, Mission Beach, Mission Bay Park, Old Town, Ocean Beach, and Point Loma.	Democratic
3	Stephen Whitburn	Balboa Park, Bankers Hill, Downtown, Golden Hill, Hillcrest, Little Italy, Middletown, Mission Hills, North Park, South Park, and University Heights.	Democratic
4	Henry L. Foster III	Alta Vista, Broadway Heights, Chollas View, Emerald Hills, Encanto, Greater Skyline Hills, Jamacha, Lincoln Park, Lomita Village, Mountain View, North Bay Terraces, O'Farrell, Oak Park, Paradise Hills, Ridgeview, South Bay Terraces, Valencia Park, and Webster.	Democratic
5	Marni von Wilpert	Black Mountain Ranch, Carmel Mountain Ranch, Miramar Ranch North, Rancho Bernardo, Rancho Peñasquitos, Sabre Springs, San Pasqual, Scripps Ranch, and Torrey Highlands.	Democratic
6	Kent Lee (Council President Pro Tem)	Kearny Mesa, Mira Mesa, Scripps Ranch, Sorrento Valley, and University City.	Democratic
7	Raul Campillo	Allied Gardens, Del Cerro, Grantville, Linda Vista, Mission Valley, San Carlos, Serra Mesa, and Tierrasanta.	Democratic
8	Vivian Moreno	Barrio Logan, Egger Highlands, Grant Hill, Logan Heights, Memorial, Nestor, Ocean View Hills, Otay Mesa East, Otay Mesa West, San Ysidro, Shelltown, Sherman Heights, Southcrest and Tijuana River Valley.	Democratic
9	Sean Elo-Rivera	Alvarado Estates, City Heights, College Area, College View Estates, El Cerrito, Kensington, Mission Valley East, Mountain View, Mount Hope, Normal Heights, Redwood Village, Rolando Park, Rolando Village, Stockton, and Talmadge.	Democratic

=== Committees ===
As of the term beginning December 2024, the city council has the following ten committees.

San Diego City Council Committees
Committee	Chair	Vice Chair
Active Transportation and Infrastructure	Stephen Whitburn	Henry L. Foster III
Audit	Vivian Moreno	Henry L. Foster III
Budget and Government Efficiency	Henry L. Foster III	Vivian Moreno
Budget Review*	Henry L. Foster III	Joe LaCava
Community and Neighborhood Services	Jennifer Campbell	Marni von Wilpert
Economic Development and Intergovernmental Relations	Raul Campillo	Kent Lee
Environment	Sean Elo-Rivera	Jennifer Campbell
Land Use and Housing	Kent Lee	Sean Elo-Rivera
Public Safety	Marni von Wilpert	Raul Campillo
Rules	Joe LaCava	Kent Lee

*The chair of the Budget and Government Efficiency Committee serves as chair of the Budget Review Committee and the Council President serves as vice chair.

City council members also serve on various regional committees with the mayor.

==== Regional Committee Appointments ====
Committee	Primary	Alternate(s)
SANDAG Board of Directors	Mayor Todd Gloria	Kent Lee
SANDAG Board of Directors	Mayor Todd Gloria	Vivian Moreno
SANDAG Board of Directors	Joe LaCava (First Vice Chair)	Sean Elo-Rivera
SANDAG Board of Directors	Joe LaCava (First Vice Chair)	Marni von Wilpert
MTS Board of Directors	Mayor Todd Gloria	Henry L. Foster III
MTS Board of Directors	Sean Elo-Rivera	Joe LaCava
MTS Board of Directors	Vivian Moreno	Jennifer Campbell
MTS Board of Directors	Stephen Whitburn	Kent Lee

== See also ==
- Mayor of San Diego
- San Diego County Board of Supervisors
