= Raul Campillo =

American attorney and politician (born 1987)

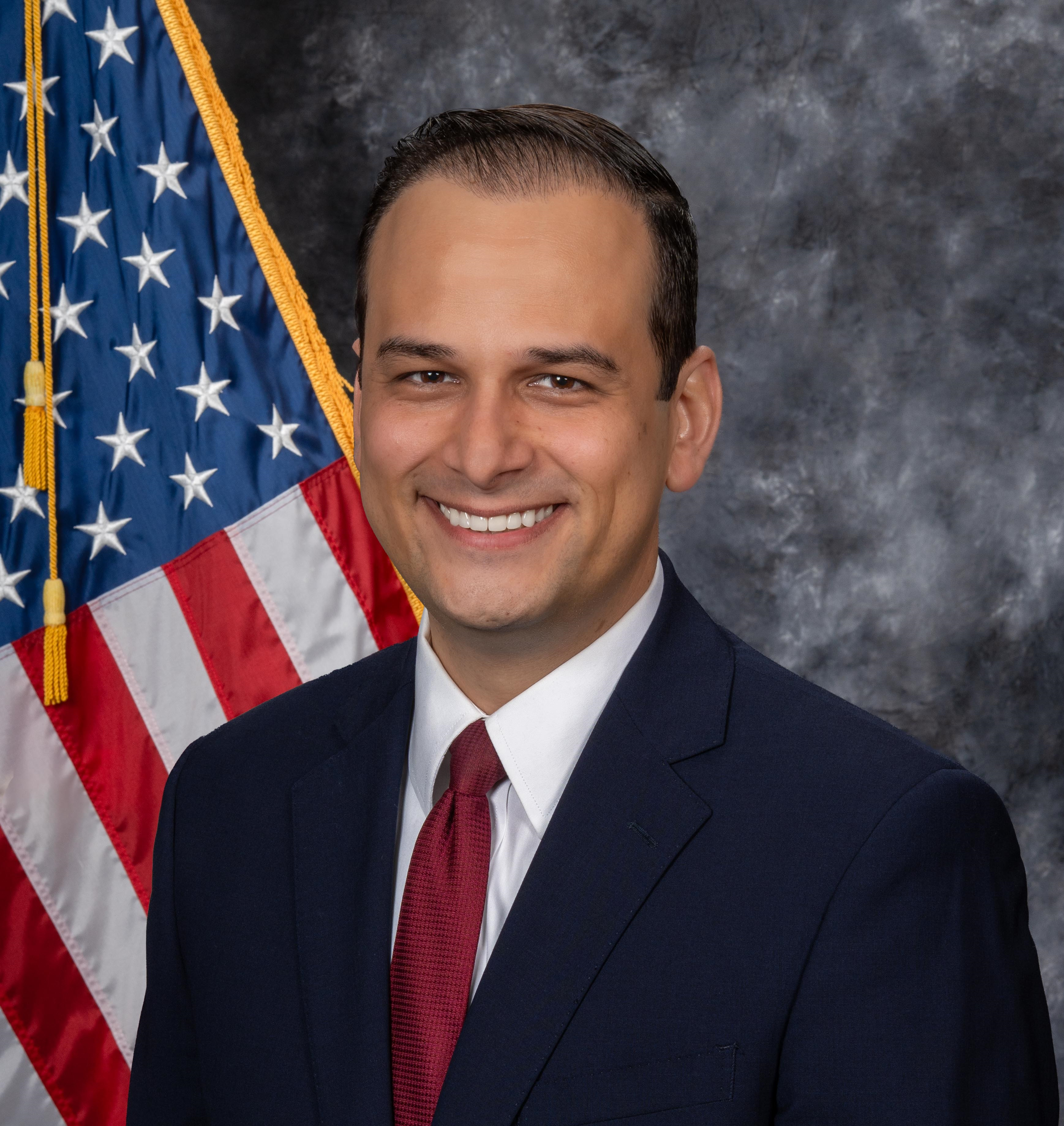

Member of the San Diego City Council from the 7th district
- Incumbent
- Assumed office December 10, 2020
- Preceded by: Scott Sherman

Personal details
- Born: Raul Armando Campillo; October 4, 1987 (age 39) San Diego, California, U.S.
- Party: Democratic
- Education: Harvard University (BA, JD); University of Nevada, Las Vegas (MEd)

Raul Armando Campillo (born October 4, 1987) is an American attorney and politician who has served as a member of the San Diego City Council since 2020, representing District 7.

A member of the Democratic Party, Campillo represents the neighborhoods of Allied Gardens, Del Cerro, Linda Vista, Grantville, San Carlos, Serra Mesa, Tierrasanta, Lake Murray, and parts of Mission Valley.

In January 2025, Campillo publicly expressed interest in running for mayor of San Diego in the 2028 election.

== Early life and career ==
Campillo was born in San Diego, California and raised in El Cajon. He graduated from University of San Diego High School in 2005. He then obtained a Bachelor of Arts degree in government from Harvard University.

Campillo joined Teach For America after college and taught as a fifth grade teacher in Las Vegas, Nevada, while completing a Master's degree in education at the University of Nevada, Las Vegas. He later returned to Harvard, where he earned a Juris Doctor from Harvard Law School.

After law school, he joined the law firm O'Melveny & Myers, where he practiced litigation and conducted white-collar criminal investigations. He later returned to San Diego to work as a Deputy City Attorney under then-San Diego City Attorney Mara Elliott.

== San Diego City Council ==
=== Elections ===
In 2020, Campillo ran for the district 7 seat on the San Diego City Council vacated by Scott Sherman, who was ineligible for re-election due to term limits. He finished first in the nonpartisan primary election with 35.8% of the vote. During the campaign, Campillo was supported by the San Diego County Democratic Party, the San Diego and Imperial Counties Labor Council AFL-CIO, and the San Diego Police Officers Association. He went on to defeat Republican Noli Zosa in the November 2020 general election with 55.0% of the vote.

Campillo ran unopposed for re-election in the 2024 San Diego City Council election, winning the election outright in the March 2024 primary.

=== Tenure ===
During his first term, Campillo voted in favor of a city council ordinance in 2023 that allowed police to remove homeless encampments on public property if city shelter beds were available, which passed in a 5–4 vote. He has supported the City's safe parking program as an alternative shelter option for individuals experiencing homelessness.

During his second term, Campillo voted in 2025 against the implementation of Measure B, which authorized the City to charge single family homes and multifamily lots with less than four units for trash collection, citing higher costs for service than the estimate given to voters in the original ballot measure. The measure passed in a 6–3 vote. Following this vote, he proposed a measure to the Rules Committee which would have required stricter requirements about cost estimates for ballot initiatives, but the committee rejected the proposal due to concerns that it would reduce council oversight and make it more costly to put initiatives on the ballot.

He voted against a 2025 proposal to charge for parking at Balboa Park, which passed in a 6–3 vote. He later voted for a settlement in 2026 which included the reduction of trash collection fees and the repeal of paid parking at Balboa Park by January 1, 2027.

Campillo initially supported and voted for contracts authorizing the usage of Flock Safety automatic license plate readers by the San Diego Police Department, citing their utility in combatting motor vehicle thefts and other investigations, but changed his position in November 2026 following allegations of misuse by department personnel.

== Personal life ==
Campillo lives in the Del Cerro neighborhood of San Diego with his wife, Nadia Farjood Campillo, and their son and daughter. Campillo is Catholic.

In 2023, Campillo and his family were hit in a vehicle collision involving a drunk driver, though no serious injuries were reported.

== Electoral history ==
2020 San Diego City Council District 7 election
Primary election
Party	Candidate	Votes	%
Democratic	Raul Campillo	15,025	35.87
Republican	Noli Zosa	12,783	30.51
Democratic	Wendy Wheatcroft	8,526	20.35
Democratic	Monty McIntyre	8,340	13.27
Total votes		47,721	100%
Democratic	Raul Campillo	40,310	55.01
Republican	Noli Zosa	32,963	44.99
Total votes		73,273	100.0
Democratic gain from Republican			

2024 San Diego City Council District 7 election
Primary election
Party	Candidate	Votes	%
Democratic	Raul Campillo (incumbent)	23,196	100
Total votes		23,196	100.0
Democratic hold			
