= Lawrence Rockwood =

American activist (born 1958)

Personal details
- Born: September 27, 1958 (age 68) Trenton, New Jersey
- Party: Independent
- Other political affiliations: Green (2003–2004), Socialist (? – 2014)
- Education: University of Florida, PhD / University of Maryland, College Park, BS
- Occupation: Adjunct professor, author, nurse, and political activist

Lawrence Rockwood (born September 27, 1958) is a human rights and democratic socialist activist who is a former U.S. Army counterintelligence officer. Concerned with human rights violations occurring in the proximity of US forces in Haiti in September 1994 and perceiving what appeared to be indifference on the part of his command toward those suffering from these violations, he conducted an unauthorized survey of the National Penitentiary in Port-au-Prince for which he was court martialed and dismissed from active service.

== Early life ==
He was born in Trenton, New Jersey to Lt. Col William Peck Rockwood, US Air Force, and Jane Hope (Priesti) Rockwood, a former Air Force nurse. As a service brat, he lived in Turkey, France, and Germany during his childhood. In 1968, his father retired from the military and moved to Gainesville, Florida where both parents worked for the University of Florida. After a traumatic experience during the eighth grade at a military school in South Carolina, he enrolled as a minor seminarian in the tenth grade at Saint Francis Preparatory Seminary run by the Capuchin Franciscan order in Lafayette New Jersey. After leaving the seminary and church due to a religious crises (after leaving the Roman Catholic Church as a young adult, he was a practicing Buddhist (Zen / Vajrayana) for 15 years), he received a diploma as a Licensed Practical Nurse.

== Military career ==
He was a fourth-generation soldier with 23 years of uniformed service (1977-He served as an enlisted soldier / noncommissioned officer from 1977 to 1983 serving as a substance abuse / behavior science counselor in Germany. He was commissioned while enrolled in ROTC at the University of Florida while in graduate school from 1984 to 1986. He was trained as a surface-to-air missile operations officer and later managed a surface-to-air missile (Patriot) fire direction center interfacing the NATO / US command structure (Federal Republic of Germany). He was rebranched as a counterintelligence officer in 1990 and served as counter-drug intelligence operations officer responsible for the operation of three counter-drug surveillance vessels and a forward based operations in Latin America and the Caribbean. It was while he was serving a counterintelligence officer during Operation Restore Democracy in Haiti in September 1994 that he was arrested and later court martialed in May 1995 for exceeding his authority for trying to document the identities of political prisoners being held by the illegal regime of General Raoul Cédras. He appealed his court martial all the way to the US Supreme Court on the basis of the military doctrine of command responsibility (his command's responsibility for political prisoners in territory his command occupied). He was given various awards by the ACLU and other organizations for the very offense that was the subject of his prosecution. Between his court martial and the US Supreme Court denying his petition for a Writ of Certiorari in 2001, he pursued his PhD in diplomatic history at the University of Florida and worked as a human rights activist.

== The Rockwood / Haitian Affair ==
Upon arriving in Haiti, Capt. Rockwood, as a military counterintelligence officer, received reports on bad prison conditions experienced by opponents of the Cédras government. He expressed concern to his commanding officers over the fact that no actions were being taken to inspect the prisons and confirm reports of conditions. After meeting with senior officers, the staff Chaplain, and the Inspector General, Capt. Rockwood was asked to continue to perform his duties as a military counterintelligence officer in the capacity of 'Force Protection' (or the minimization of American casualties), as that was the current mission of the military intelligence assets assigned to the Task Force. He was told that his complaints would be addressed in the coming days, and that he was not to inspect the prisons without "full military support". After this process, on his seventh day in Haiti, Capt. Rockwood departed the secure military facility without permission, or 'went AWOL'. He then transited to a local prison, where he carried out an 'inspection', threatening the Warden and guards with his weapon. At midnight Major Spencer Lane, USA "...persuaded him to unchamber the round in his rifle and to accompany him back to the barracks compound." He was flown back to Ft. Drum, NY the next day after a Psychiatric Evaluation.

At the time of the deployment, Capt. Rockwood had been diagnosed with depression and was taking the anti-depressant Prozac.

== Human rights and political activism ==
After his separation from active military service, he served as a Fellow for Center for International Policy, a consultant for the Institute for Policy Studies, Amnesty International's Military, Police, and Security Working Group, and has been contracted as a human rights instructor for the Department of the Army and Department of Defense. He received his Ph.D. in American diplomatic history in 2005 from the University of Florida. The University of Massachusetts Press published his book Walking Away from Nuremberg: Just War and the Doctrine of Command Responsibility in the American Military Profession in the fall of 2007.

Party political offices
Preceded by none	Green Party Candidate for California's 53rd congressional district 2004 (lost)	Succeeded by none
