= Sean Elo-Rivera =

American politician

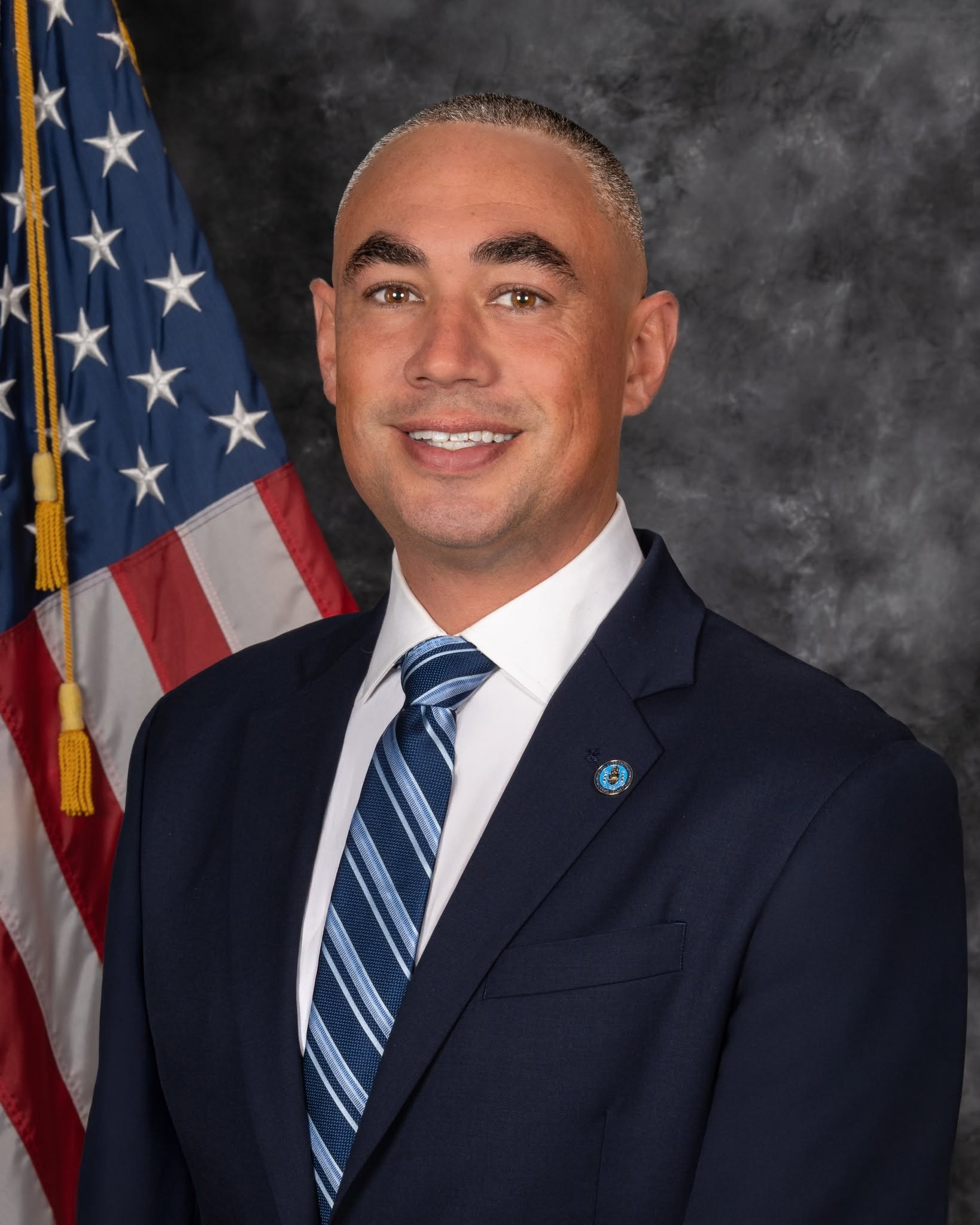

President of the San Diego City Council
- In office December 6, 2021 – December 10, 2024
- Preceded by: Jennifer Campbell
- Succeeded by: Joe LaCava

Member of the San Diego City Council from the 9th district
- Incumbent
- Assumed office December 10, 2020
- Preceded by: Georgette Gomez

Personal details
- Party: Democratic
- Education: Chapman University (BA); California Western School of Law (JD)

Sean Elo-Rivera is an American politician who has served as a member of the San Diego City Council since 2020, representing District 9. A member of the Democratic Party, he served as president of the city council from 2021 to 2024.

Elo-Rivera represents the communities of Kensington, Normal Heights, and East San Diego, as well as the main campus of San Diego State University.

== Early life and education ==
Elo-Rivera's father was a Sephardic Jew of Syrian descent, and his grandmother was an Ashkenazi Jew from Ukraine. His mother is the daughter of Catholic immigrants from Nicaragua and Panama. Elo-Rivera was raised in Orange County, California as well as in Jupiter and Palm Beach, Florida.

He graduated from Chapman University in 2009 with a Bachelor of Arts in social science and worked for a year as an English teacher in South Chungcheong, South Korea. He then attended the California Western School of Law, where he obtained a Juris Doctor in 2013.

== Political career ==
After law school, Elo-Rivera worked for the California Democratic Party on the 2014 campaign of Congressman Scott Peters. He then worked as the director of campaigns and policy for the Mid-City Community Action Network from 2015 to 2018 before becoming the executive director of Youth Will, a youth policy advocacy organization in 2018.

In 2018, Elo-Rivera ran for the District E seat on the San Diego Community College District Board of Trustees. He placed second in the June primary with 21.3% of the vote behind San Diego city councilmember David Alvarez. Elo-Rivera went on to narrowly defeat Alvarez in the general election with 50.6% of the vote.

=== San Diego City Council ===
==== Elections ====
In 2019, Elo-Rivera announced his candidacy for the District 9 seat on the San Diego City Council vacated by Georgette Gómez, who ran for California's 53rd congressional district. During the campaign, he emphasized his support for a city-wide plan to address climate change.

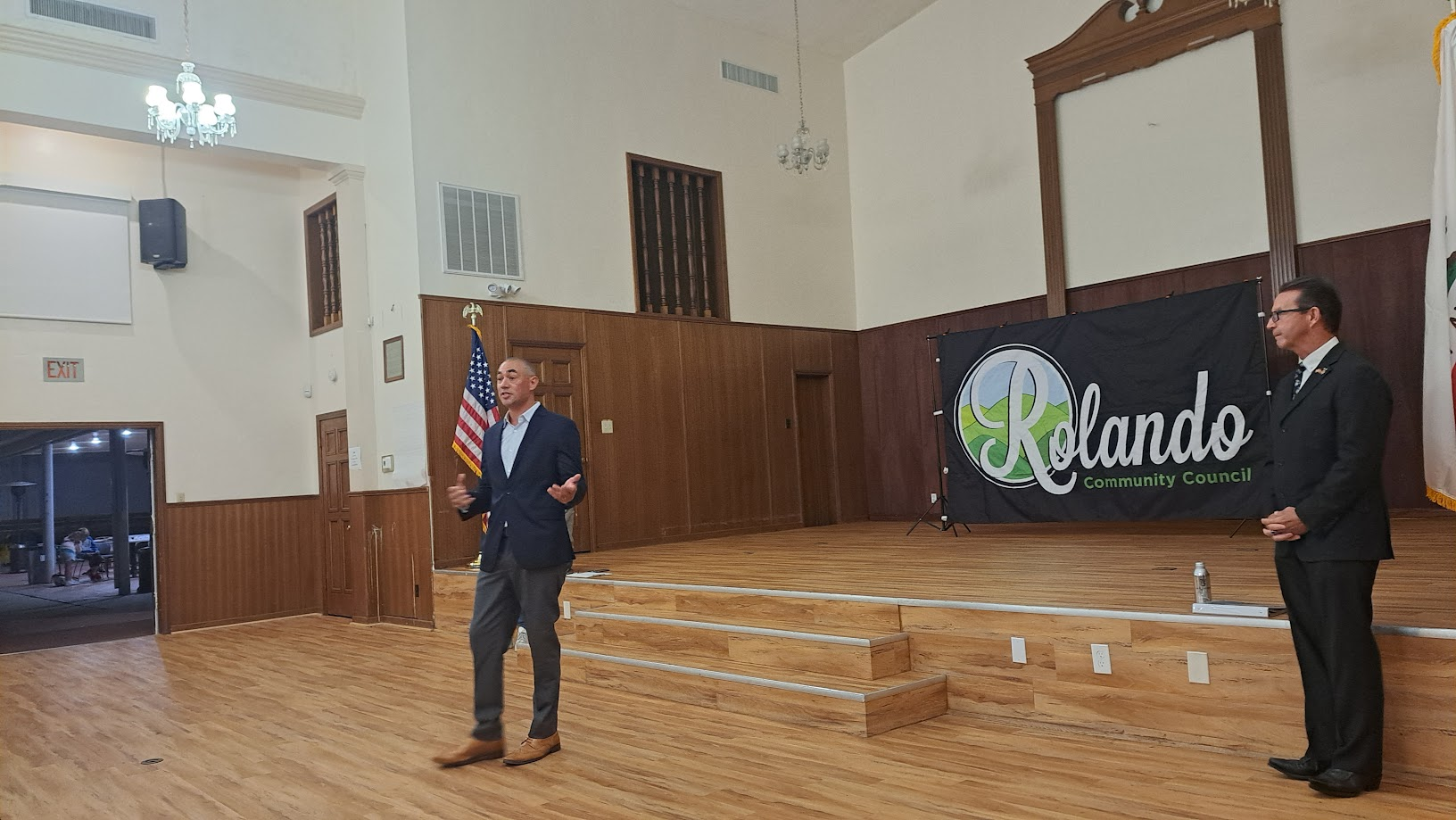
Sean Elo-Rivera and Terry Hoskins debate in Rolando (October 15, 2024)

Elo-Rivera came in second in the March 2020 primary behind former aide to Gómez and fellow Democrat Kelvin Barrios with 20.5% and 31.6% of the vote, respectively. Barrios suspended his campaign in September 2020 due to financial misconduct, but still appeared on the November ballot. Elo-Rivera went on to defeat Barrios with 62.7% of the vote.

Elo-Rivera ran for re-election in 2024, advancing from the primary election with 51.9% of the vote. He went on to defeat retired police officer and fellow Democrat Terry Hoskins with 60.2% of the vote in the general election.

==== Tenure ====
During his first term, Elo-Rivera was elected president of the San Diego City Council in 2021, defeating incumbent Jennifer Campbell in a 5–4 vote. He was re-elected as council president in 2022 and 2023 by votes of 9–0 and 5–4, respectively.

Elo-Rivera co-sponsored Measure B, a 2022 ballot measure authorizing the city to charge for solid waste collection. He introduced a temporary moratorium on no-fault evictions, which passed in a 5–1 vote. He later introduced the Residential Tenant Protections Ordinance in 2023, which expanded tenant protections and restricted certain no-fault evictions; the measure passed in an 8–1 vote.

Elo-Rivera voted against a 2023 city council ordinance that permitted police to remove homeless encampments on public property if city shelter beds were available, which passed in a 5–4 vote.

After the 2024 election, Elo-Rivera announced that he would not seek another term as council president, and was succeeded by Joe LaCava.

During his second term, Elo-Rivera opposed the expansion of Waymo autonomous vehicles in San Diego, citing concerns about impacts on taxi and rideshare drivers. He authored Measure A, a June 2026 ballot measure which would have levied a tax on non-primary homes that were vacant for more than half of the year. The measure failed to pass, garnering only 46.8% of the vote.

== Personal life ==
Elo-Rivera lives in the Kensington neighborhood of San Diego with his wife, Angela and their son. Elo-Rivera is Jewish.
