= Marni von Wilpert =

American attorney and politician (born 1982)

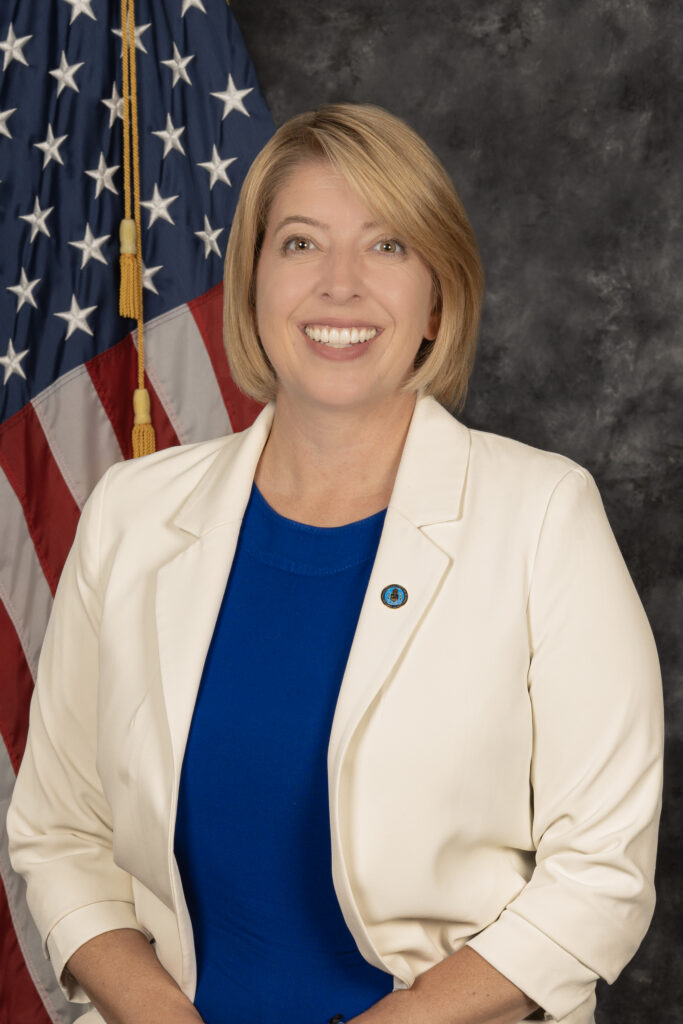
- Official portrait, 2025

Member-elect of the U.S. House of Representatives from California's 48th district
- Assuming office January 3, 2027
- Succeeding: Darrell Issa

Member of the San Diego City Council from the 5th district
- Incumbent
- Assumed office December 10, 2020
- Preceded by: Mark Kersey

Personal details
- Born: Marni Lynn von Wilpert; December 27, 1982 (age 43) San Diego, California, U.S.
- Party: Democratic
- Education: University of California, Berkeley (BA); Fordham University (JD)

Marni Lynn von Wilpert (born December 27, 1982) is an American attorney and politician who is the U.S. representative-elect for California's 48th congressional district. A member of the Democratic Party, she has served as a member of the San Diego City Council since 2020, representing District 5.

Prior to serving in elected office, von Wilpert worked as an attorney for the National Labor Relations Board, on the staff of the House Education and Labor Committee, and as a deputy city attorney under then-San Diego City Attorney Mara Elliott.

== Early life and career ==
Marni von Wilpert was born and raised in the Scripps Ranch neighborhood of San Diego. After graduating from Scripps Ranch High School in 2001, she earned a Bachelor of Arts degree in peace and conflict studies from the University of California, Berkeley in 2005. She then served as a Peace Corps volunteer in Botswana from 2006 to 2008, during the height of the HIV/AIDS epidemic in Africa.

Von Wilpert obtained a Juris Doctor from the Fordham University School of Law in 2011. After graduating from law school, von Wilpert founded a legal clinic associated with the Mississippi Center for Justice. During her time working in the center's Mississippi Delta office, she represented people with HIV/AIDS facing discrimination in both employment and healthcare. Additionally, von Wilpert served as a law clerk for Judge James E. Graves Jr. and worked as an attorney for the National Labor Relations Board. She was also a detail staffer on the United States House Committee on Education and Labor and served as an advisor to committee chair Congressman Bobby Scott. While a part of the committee staff, von Wilpert helped to draft labor legislation that included the Protecting the Right to Organize Act. In 2017, von Wilpert joined the Economic Policy Institute as Associate Labor Counsel. She served as Deputy City Attorney in the San Diego City Attorney's Office from 2018 to 2020.

== San Diego City Council ==
=== Elections ===
In the 2020 San Diego city council election, von Wilpert placed first in the nonpartisan blanket primary and defeated Joe Leventhal in the November general election. She assumed office on December 10, 2020. She ran unopposed in the 2024 San Diego City Council election, winning reelection outright in the primary on March 5, 2024.

=== Tenure ===
During her first term, she was appointed to serve on the San Diego County Regional Airport Authority board of directors in 2020. Von Wilpert voted for a city council ordinance in 2023 that permitted police to remove homeless encampments on public property if city shelter beds were available, which passed in a 5–4 vote.

During her second term, von Wilpert co-sponsored an ordinance which required grocery stores with digital-only coupons to make the same discounts available to all customers in-store. The measure passed unanimously, making San Diego the first city in the United States to adopt such a requirement.

As chair of the Public Safety Committee, Von Wilpert initially supported and voted for contracts authorizing the usage of Flock Safety automatic license plate readers by the San Diego Police Department, citing their utility in preventing violent crimes and in combatting motor vehicle thefts, but called for a pause of the technology in November 2026 following allegations of misuse by department personnel.

== U.S. House of Representatives ==
=== Elections ===
After her reelection in 2024, von Wilpert filed to run for California's 40th State Senatorial district in the 2026 election. Shortly afterwards, she dropped her state Senate bid to run for the U.S. Congress in California's 48th congressional district. During the primary, she was supported by the California Federation of Labor Unions AFL-CIO, the San Diego and Imperial Counties Labor Council AFL-CIO, the California Teachers Association, the LGBTQ+ Victory Fund, former President pro tempore of the California State Senate Toni Atkins, and Representative Mark Takano. Von Wilpert and Republican County Supervisor Jim Desmond advanced from the June primary with 20.6% and 38.9% of the vote, respectively.

After the primary, the Democratic Congressional Campaign Committee added von Wilpert to its "Red to Blue" program that highlights its highest-targeted races while the National Republican Congressional Committee added Desmond to its list of top priority candidates. By mid-October, von Wilpert had raised $4.5 million against Desmond's $3 million with outside spending in the race exceeding $6 million overall, mostly in support of von Wilpert.

Von Wilpert defeated Desmond in the general election, flipping the seat from Republican to Democrat.

== Personal life ==
Von Wilpert lives in the Scripps Ranch neighborhood of San Diego, California. She is bisexual and plans to marry her fiancée, Sarah, in 2027.

== Electoral history ==
Electoral history of Marni von Wilpert
Year	Office		Party	Primary			General			Result	Swing	Ref.
Year	Office		Party	Total	%	P.	Total	%	P.	Result	Swing	Ref.
2026	U.S. House	48th	Democratic	39,327	20.8	2nd	TBD					
Source: Secretary of State of California | Statewide Election Results

U.S. House of Representatives
Preceded by Darrell Issa	Member of the U.S. House of Representatives from California's 48th congressional district Taking office 2027	Elect
