= Joe LaCava =

American politician

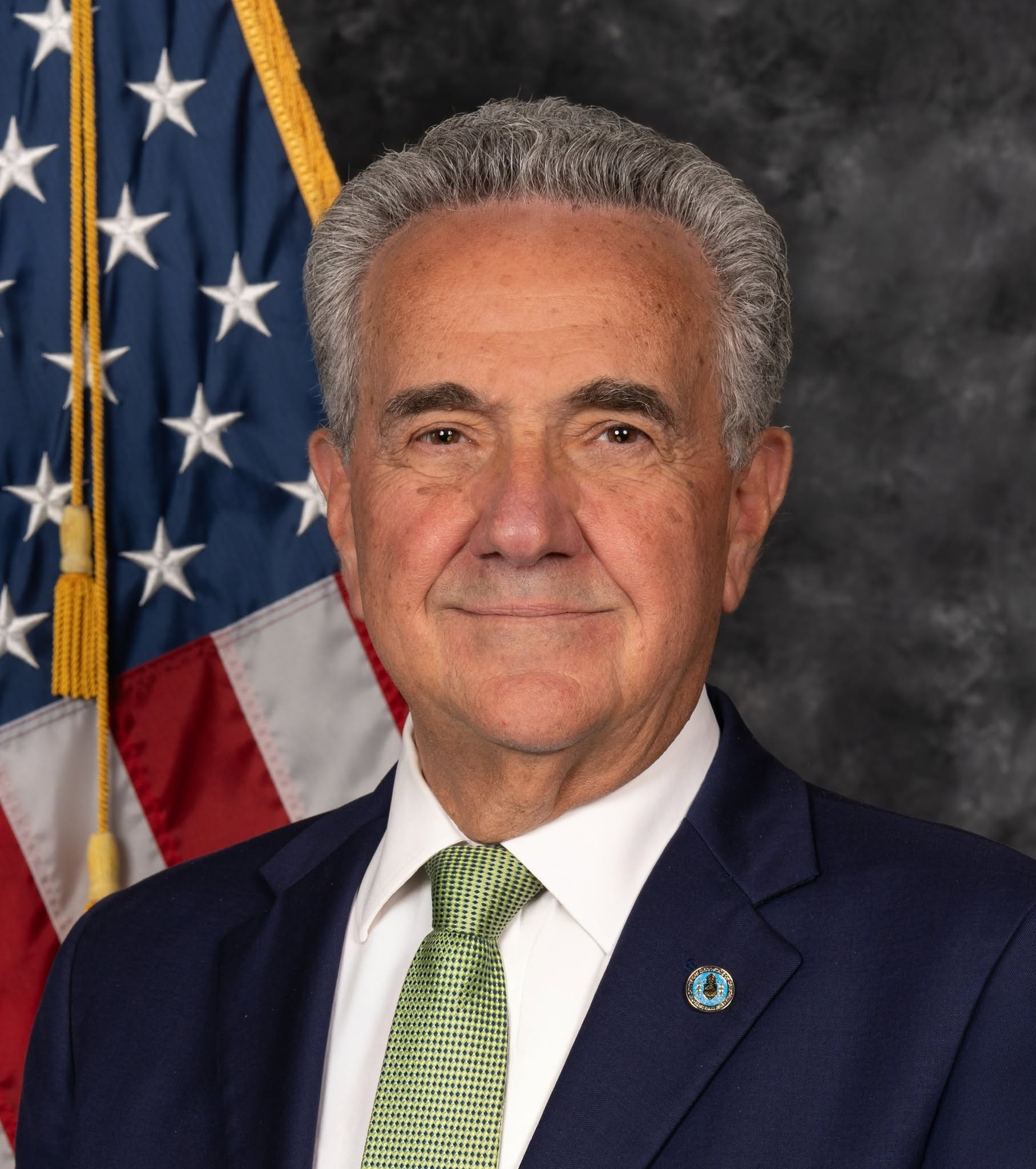

President of the San Diego City Council
- Incumbent
- Assumed office December 10, 2024
- Mayor: Todd Gloria
- Preceded by: Sean Elo-Rivera

President Pro Tempore of the San Diego City Council
- In office December 5, 2023 – December 10, 2024
- Mayor: Todd Gloria
- Council President: Sean Elo-Rivera
- Preceded by: Monica Montgomery Steppe
- Succeeded by: Kent Lee

Member of the San Diego City Council from the 1st district
- Incumbent
- Assumed office December 10, 2020
- Mayor: Todd Gloria
- Preceded by: Barbara Bry

Personal details
- Party: Democratic
- Education: San Diego State University (BSE)

Joseph LaCava is an American politician and engineer serving as the president of the San Diego City Council since 2024. A member of the Democratic Party, he served as president pro tempore of the city council from 2023 to 2024 under council president Sean Elo-Rivera and has served as a member of the city council since 2020, representing District 1.

== Early life and education ==
Joe LaCava was raised in the San Diego neighborhoods of Logan Heights and University Heights, before his family moved to Allied Gardens. After graduating Patrick Henry High School, he attended San Diego State University, where he earned his bachelor's degree in engineering.

== Career ==
LaCava worked for the United States Forest Service in Northern California upon graduation, and became a civil engineer when he returned to San Diego. He served on the Bird Rock Community Council before becoming chairman of the La Jolla Community Planning Association.

He ran for the San Diego City Council seat vacated by Barbara Bry and won in both primary and general election contests during the 2020 San Diego elections, defeating general election candidate Will Moore. He took office in December 2020. He represents the 1st District on the San Diego City Council, which includes the communities of La Jolla, Carmel Valley, and Torrey Pines, as well as the campus of the University of California, San Diego. The district originally included University City until the 2021 redistricting where it was removed in favor of Pacific Beach.

After assuming office in December 2020, LaCava served as president pro tempore of the San Diego City Council from 2023 to 2024. He ran for re-election to his council seat unopposed in the 2024 election. After the election, LaCava was elected to serve as president of the city council in a 9–0 vote.
