= El Cerrito, San Diego =

Town in America

Coordinates: 32.753499°N 117.073059°W

El Cerrito (Spanish for "The Little Hill") is a neighborhood of the Mid-City region of San Diego, California. El Cerrito is a residential neighborhood, consisting mostly of suburban homes, with some commercial activity along the streets that define its borders.

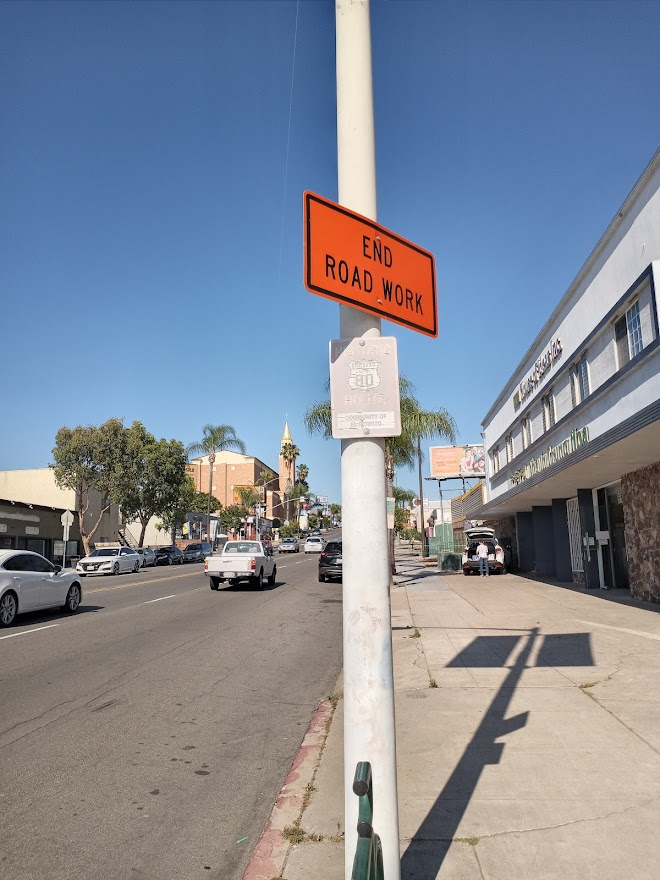
Faded historic US 80 sign on El Cajon Boulevard with Blessed Sacrament Catholic Church in the Background.

== History ==
The name "El Cerrito" refers to the little hill that rises from 55th Street to 58th Street, this "little hill" was the largest of the rises on the old Cajon Road and first is documented by that name in the late 1800s. In the early years of San Diego the neighborhood consisted primarily of orange and lemon orchards. The area became developed in the 1920s with the creation of El Cajon Boulevard which runs through the middle of the neighborhood.

== Geography ==
El Cerrito, as its name suggests, is centered on a small hill encircled by Overlook Drive. The neighborhood's borders are defined by 54th street to the West, the Baja Canyon to the North, College Avenue to the East, and University Avenue/Chollas Parkway to the South.

== Government ==
The neighborhood is part of San Diego City Council district 9 and is currently represented by Sean Elo-Rivera. Neighborhood organizations include the El Cerrito Community Council.

== Education ==
El Cerrito is served by the San Diego Unified School District and is home to Iftin Charter (formerly Jackson Elementary) School, Horace Mann Middle School, and Will C. Crawford High School.
