= Mira Mesa, San Diego =

- Neighborhood of San Diego
- Nickname: Manila Mesa
- Location in California Mira Mesa, San Diego (the United States)
- Coordinates: 32°54′56″N 117°08′38″W
- Country: United States of America
- State: California
- County: San Diego
- City: San Diego

Government
  - City Council: Kent Lee (D)
  - State Assembly: Chris Ward (D)
  - State Senate: Brian Jones (R)
  - U.S. House: Sara Jacobs (D)

Area
  - Total: 16.406 sq mi (42.49 km^{2})
- Elevation: 436 ft (133 m)

Population (2010)
  - Total: 72,759
  - Density: 4,435/sq mi (1,712/km^{2})
- ZIP Codes: 92121, 92126
- Area codes: 619/858
- GNIS feature ID: 1656569
- Website: Official website

Mira Mesa (Spanish for "Table View"), which was established in the late 1960s, is a community and neighborhood in San Diego, California. The city-recognized Mira Mesa Community Plan Area is roughly bounded by Interstate 15 on the east, Interstate 805 on the west, the Los Peñasquitos Canyon on the north and Marine Corps Air Station Miramar on the south. Most of the community plan area is referred to as Mira Mesa; the community plan area also includes the neighborhoods of Sorrento Valley and Sorrento Mesa.

The Mira Mesa neighborhood, as defined by the San Diego Police Department's neighborhood map, is roughly bounded by Interstate 15 to the east, Camino Santa Fe to the west, the Los Peñasquitos Canyon to the north and Carroll Canyon to the south.

== History ==
Prior to European settlement, Mira Mesa was inhabited by the Kumeyaay peoples who lived along Penasquitos Creek.

After Mexican independence, the land became part of the Rancho Santa Maria de Los Peñasquitos land grant to Francisco María Ruiz in 1823.

Around the time of World War II the area now called Mira Mesa was used by the United States Army as a test area. Just west of U.S. Route 395 (now Interstate 15) was a Navy auxiliary landing field, known locally as Hourglass Field because the layout of the runways was a single piece of asphalt in the shape of an hourglass. The Navy also used the surrounding area as a bombing range.

Starting in 1969 there was a housing boom in the area that now extends from the I-15 freeway in the east to I-805 in the west and is approximately 10,500 acres (42 km^{2}). This was one of the earliest areas of urban sprawl along the I-15 Corridor. Hourglass Field became the site of San Diego Miramar College and Hourglass Field Community Park. The area was built so quickly that it lacked schools, shopping centers, or other services for its thousands of residents. In 1971 Pete Wilson started his political career running for mayor with the slogan "No more Mira Mesas!" as a promise to stop quick, unplanned growth in San Diego.

Since its inception, Mira Mesa was largely influenced by the military located at the adjacent NAS Miramar. Mira Mesa was the northernmost "real community" of San Diego, and was separated from the rest of the city by NAS Miramar for many years.

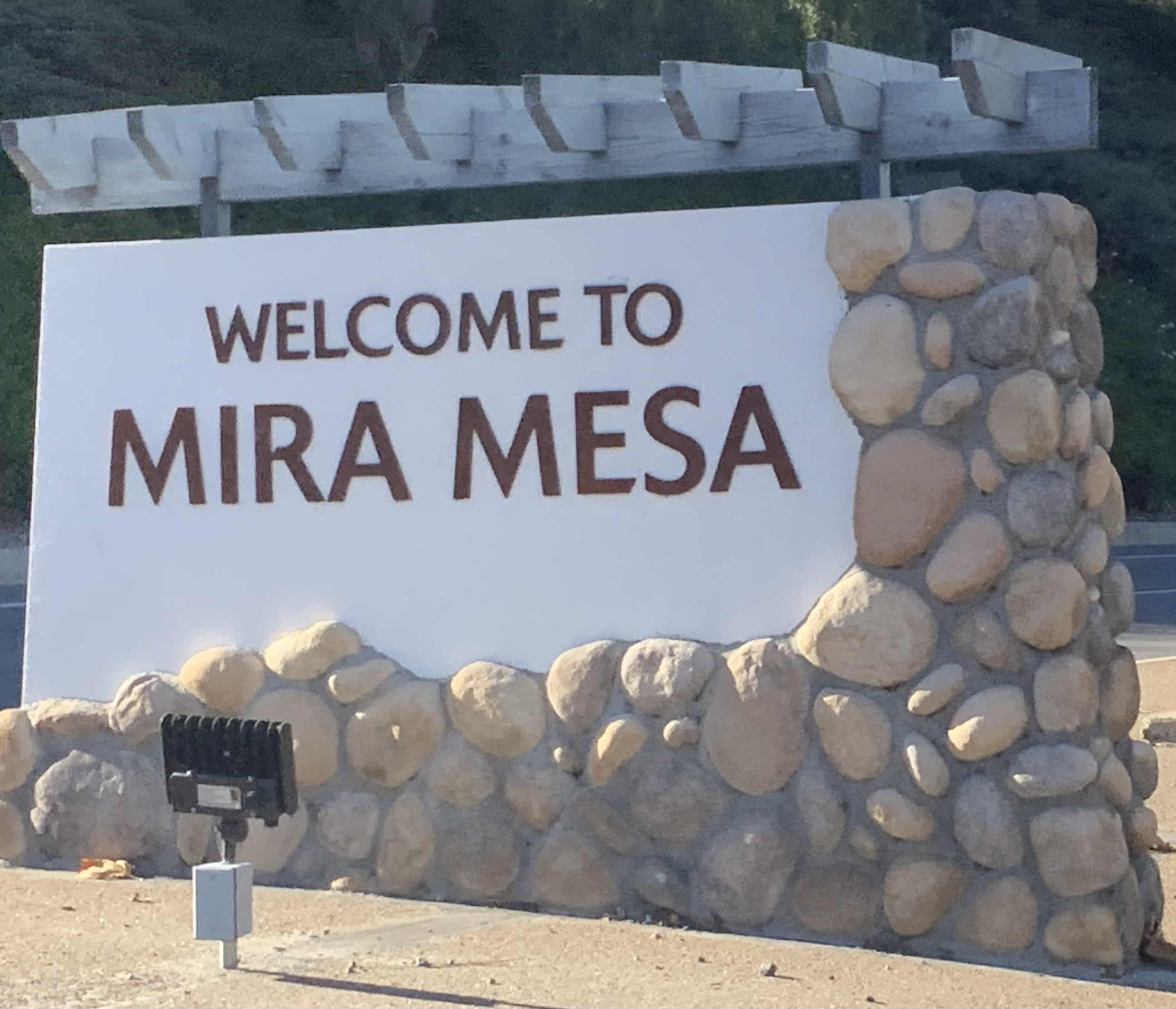
One of several “Welcome to Mira Mesa” signs in Mira Mesa.

By the late-1990s, the Mira Mesa area had undergone extensive expansion to accommodate the thousands of new residents attracted by its proximity to major employers like the University of California, San Diego, Marine Corps Air Station Miramar, Qualcomm, and dozens of biotech and pharmaceutical companies. Several commercial and industrial centers have been built within the Mira Mesa area.

Mira Mesa area has attracted a large Filipino and Vietnamese community.

== Demographics ==
Mira Mesa has about 80,000 residents, including students, families, and single people. There are over 23,000 homes in the community, averaging 3.09 people per household. The median age is 32.4 years.

== Economy ==
In 2000, the Mira Mesa Market Center opened. The shopping center received around 6.7 million visits in 2023.

== Arts and culture ==
- The Mira Mesa Street Fair is held the first Saturday in October on Camino Ruiz on the block just north of Mira Mesa Boulevard. The fair is sponsored by the Mira Mesa Town Council.
- Annual San Diego Tet Festival is held at Mira Mesa Park on Lunar New Year Weekend. Moved to Liberty Station due to renovations at Mira Mesa Community Park.
- Mira Mesa dedicated a street solely for the legacy and honor of Julia Legaspi, a transgender Filipino American who was a pioneer for transgender rights in San Diego.

== Sports ==
- Mira Mesa girls' softball, for ages 12 and under, won the state championship in 1999, 2005 and 2006.

== Education ==
The neighborhood's schools are in San Diego Unified School District.

Elementary schools

- Ericson Elementary School
- Hage Elementary School
- Hickman Elementary School
- Jonas Salk Elementary School
- Mason Elementary School
- Sandburg Elementary School
- Walker Elementary School

Middle schools

- Challenger Middle School
- Wangenheim Middle School

High schools

- Mira Mesa High School

=== Private schools ===
- Christ the Cornerstone Academy
- Good Shepherd Catholic School (Roman Catholic Diocese of San Diego)
- Mira Mesa Christian School
- Rainbow Kids Integral Preschool

=== Community colleges ===
- Miramar College

=== Weekend education ===
In the early 1990s the Minato School (a Japanese weekend school) held its classes at Wangenheim Junior High. However it moved to Chula Vista in 1996.

== Media ==
- Mira Mesa Living, a community newspaper publishing local news and events, started publishing bimonthly in July 2010. The previous community newspaper, the Mira Mesa Scripps Ranch Sentinel, stopped publication in July 2009.Mira Mesa has a community radio station at 87.9
- The Mira Mesa Times newspaper

== Infrastructure ==
=== Emergency services ===
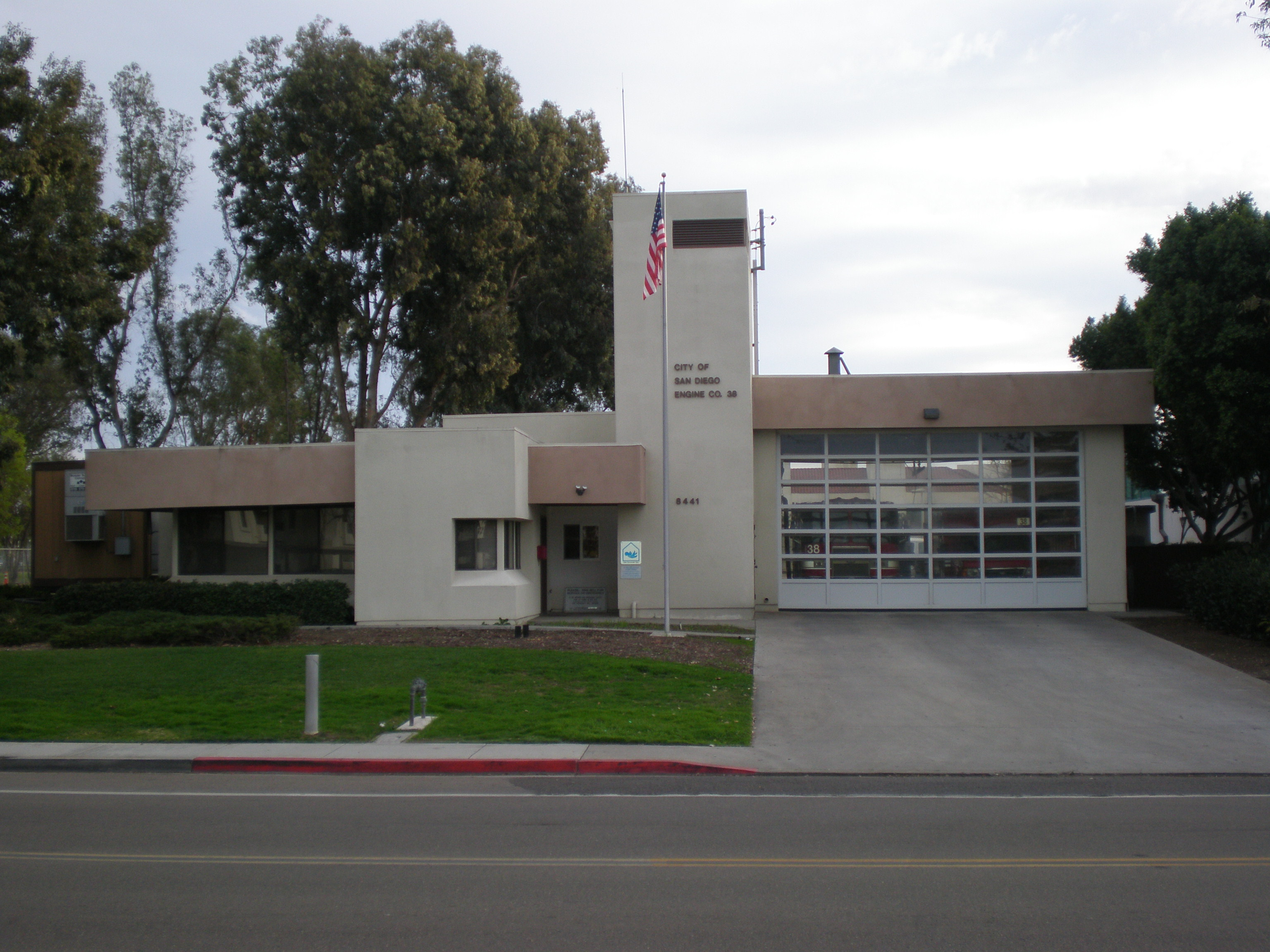
SDFD Fire Station #38

The San Diego Fire-Rescue Department provide fire services to Mira Mesa through Fire Station #38 and Fire Station #44. Fire Station #38, which includes Engine 38, Truck 38, and Paramedic 38, is located on New Salem Street near the main Mira Mesa Park and Recreation Center. Fire Station #44 is located at the corner of Black Mountain Road and Maya Linda Road. It includes Engine 44, Truck 44, and HAZMAT 1 and 2.

Mira Mesa is served by the Northeastern division of the San Diego Police Department. A police storefront located adjacent to the Epicentre along Mira Mesa Boulevard serves the local area including Scripps Ranch.

== Notable people ==
- FaZe Rug, gaming YouTuber and media personality
- Lysley Tenorio, short-story writer and author
- Michael Pittman Sr., former National Football League running back for the Tampa Bay Buccaneers
- Ray Rowe, former NFL player, played as tight end for the Washington Commanders (back then the Redskins)
- Tyler Saladino, former major league baseball player
