= California's 53rd congressional district =

U.S. House district for California

Coordinates: 32.74°N 117.035°W

- Obsolete district
- Created: 2000
- Eliminated: 2020
- Years active: 2003–2023

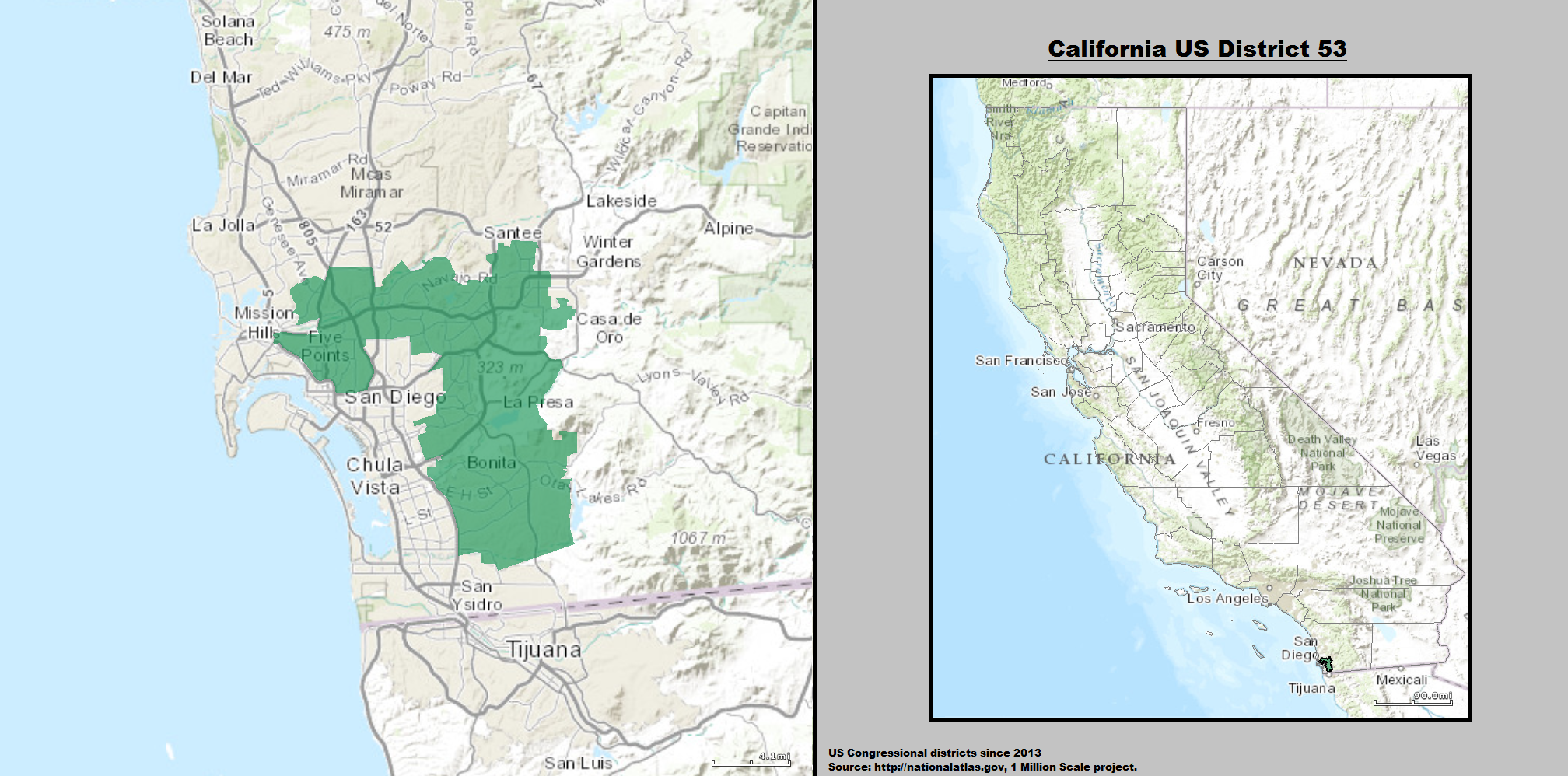
The district from 2013 to 2023

California's 53rd congressional district was a congressional district in the U.S. state of California. It was last represented by Sara Jacobs, who succeeded Susan Davis following the 2020 election. It was eliminated following the 2020 United States redistricting cycle, becoming the first congressional seat to be lost after a census in California's history.

The district was in San Diego County before it was abolished. It included eastern portions of Chula Vista, western portions of El Cajon, central and eastern portions of the city of San Diego, as well as eastern suburbs such as Bonita, La Mesa, Lemon Grove, and Spring Valley in their entirety.

== Election results from statewide races ==
Year	Office	Results
2008	President	Obama 62% - 37%
2010	Governor	Brown 53% - 41%
2010	Lt. Governor	Newsom 51% - 39%
2010	Secretary of State	Bowen 54% - 37%
2010	Attorney General	Harris 47% - 43%
2010	Treasurer	Lockyer 57% - 35%
2010	Controller	Chiang 58% - 34%
2012	President	Obama 61% - 36%
2012	Senate	Feinstein 63% - 37%
2014	Governor	Brown 60% - 40%
2016	President	Clinton 64% - 30%
2016	Senate	Harris 60% - 40%
2018	Senate	Feinstein 55% - 45%
2018	Governor	Newsom 65% - 35%
2018	Attorney General	Becerra 67% - 33%
2020	President	Biden 67% - 31%

== List of members representing the district ==
Member	Party	Dates	Cong ress(es)	Electoral history	Counties
District created January 3, 2003
Susan Davis (San Diego)	Democratic	January 3, 2003 – January 3, 2021	108th 109th 110th 111th 112th 113th 114th 115th 116th	Redistricted from the 49th district and re-elected in 2002. Re-elected in 2004. Re-elected in 2006. Re-elected in 2008. Re-elected in 2010. Re-elected in 2012. Re-elected in 2014. Re-elected in 2016. Re-elected in 2018. Retired.	2003–2013; San Diego (San Diego)
Susan Davis (San Diego)	Democratic	January 3, 2003 – January 3, 2021	108th 109th 110th 111th 112th 113th 114th 115th 116th	Redistricted from the 49th district and re-elected in 2002. Re-elected in 2004. Re-elected in 2006. Re-elected in 2008. Re-elected in 2010. Re-elected in 2012. Re-elected in 2014. Re-elected in 2016. Re-elected in 2018. Retired.	2013–2023; San Diego (San Diego, Chula Vista, El Cajon, La Mesa)
Sara Jacobs (San Diego)	Democratic	January 3, 2021 – January 3, 2023	117th	Elected in 2020. Redistricted to the 51st district.	2013–2023; San Diego (San Diego, Chula Vista, El Cajon, La Mesa)
District eliminated January 3, 2023

== Election results ==
=== 2002 ===
2002 United States House of Representatives elections in California
Party	Candidate	Votes	%
Democratic	Susan A. Davis (Incumbent)	72,252	62.2
Republican	Bill VanDeWeghe	43,891	37.8
Independent	Jim Dorenkott (write-in)	37	0.0
Total votes		116,180	100.0
Democratic win (new seat)			

=== 2004 ===
2004 United States House of Representatives elections in California
Party	Candidate	Votes	%
Democratic	Susan A. Davis (Incumbent)	146,449	66.1
Republican	Darin Hunzeker	63,897	28.9
Green	Lawrence Rockwood	7,523	3.4
Libertarian	Adam Van Susteren	3,567	1.6
Total votes		221,436	100.0
Democratic hold			

=== 2006 ===
2006 United States House of Representatives elections in California
Party	Candidate	Votes	%
Democratic	Susan A. Davis (Incumbent)	97,541	67.6
Republican	John "Woody" Woodrum	43,312	30.0
Libertarian	Ernie Lippe	3,534	2.4
Total votes		144,387	100.0
Democratic hold			

=== 2008 ===
2008 United States House of Representatives elections in California
Party	Candidate	Votes	%
Democratic	Susan A. Davis (Incumbent)	161,315	68.5
Republican	Michael Crimmins	64,658	27.4
Libertarian	Edward M. Teyssier	9,569	4.1
Total votes		235,542	100.0
Democratic hold			

=== 2010 ===
2010 United States House of Representatives elections in California
Party	Candidate	Votes	%
Democratic	Susan A. Davis (Incumbent)	104,800	62.3
Republican	Michael Crimmins	57,230	34.0
Libertarian	Paul Dekker	6,298	3.7
Total votes		168,328	100.0
Democratic hold			

=== 2012 ===
2012 United States House of Representatives elections in California
Party	Candidate	Votes	%
Democratic	Susan A. Davis (Incumbent)	164,825	61.4
Republican	Nick Popaditch	103,482	38.6
Total votes		268,307	100.0
Democratic hold			

=== 2014 ===
2014 United States House of Representatives elections in California
Party	Candidate	Votes	%
Democratic	Susan A. Davis (Incumbent)	87,104	58.8
Republican	Larry A. Wilske	60,940	41.2
Total votes		148,044	100.0
Democratic hold			

=== 2016 ===
2016 United States House of Representatives elections in California
Party	Candidate	Votes	%
Democratic	Susan A. Davis (Incumbent)	198,988	67.0
Republican	James Veltmeyer	97,968	33.0
Total votes		296,956	100.0
Democratic hold			

=== 2018 ===
2018 United States House of Representatives elections in California
Party	Candidate	Votes	%
Democratic	Susan A. Davis (Incumbent)	185,667	69.1
Republican	Morgan Murtaugh	83,127	30.9
Total votes		268,794	100.0
Democratic hold			

=== 2020 ===
2020 United States House of Representatives elections in California
Party	Candidate	Votes	%
Democratic	Sara Jacobs	192,897	59.5
Democratic	Georgette Gómez	131,349	40.5
Total votes		324,246	100.0
Democratic hold			

== See also ==
- List of United States congressional districts
- California's congressional delegations
