= Alvarado Estates, San Diego =

Coordinates: 32°46′28.99″N 117°5′28.83″W

Alvarado Estates is a neighborhood in the College Area of San Diego, California. It is a gated community of over 100 homes on lots of one acre or more, with limited access streets, and has a community park. Neighborliness is fostered by the Alvarado Community Association, which is governed by a volunteer Board of Directors.

== See also ==
- Communities of San Diego
