= Kent Lee (politician) =

American politician

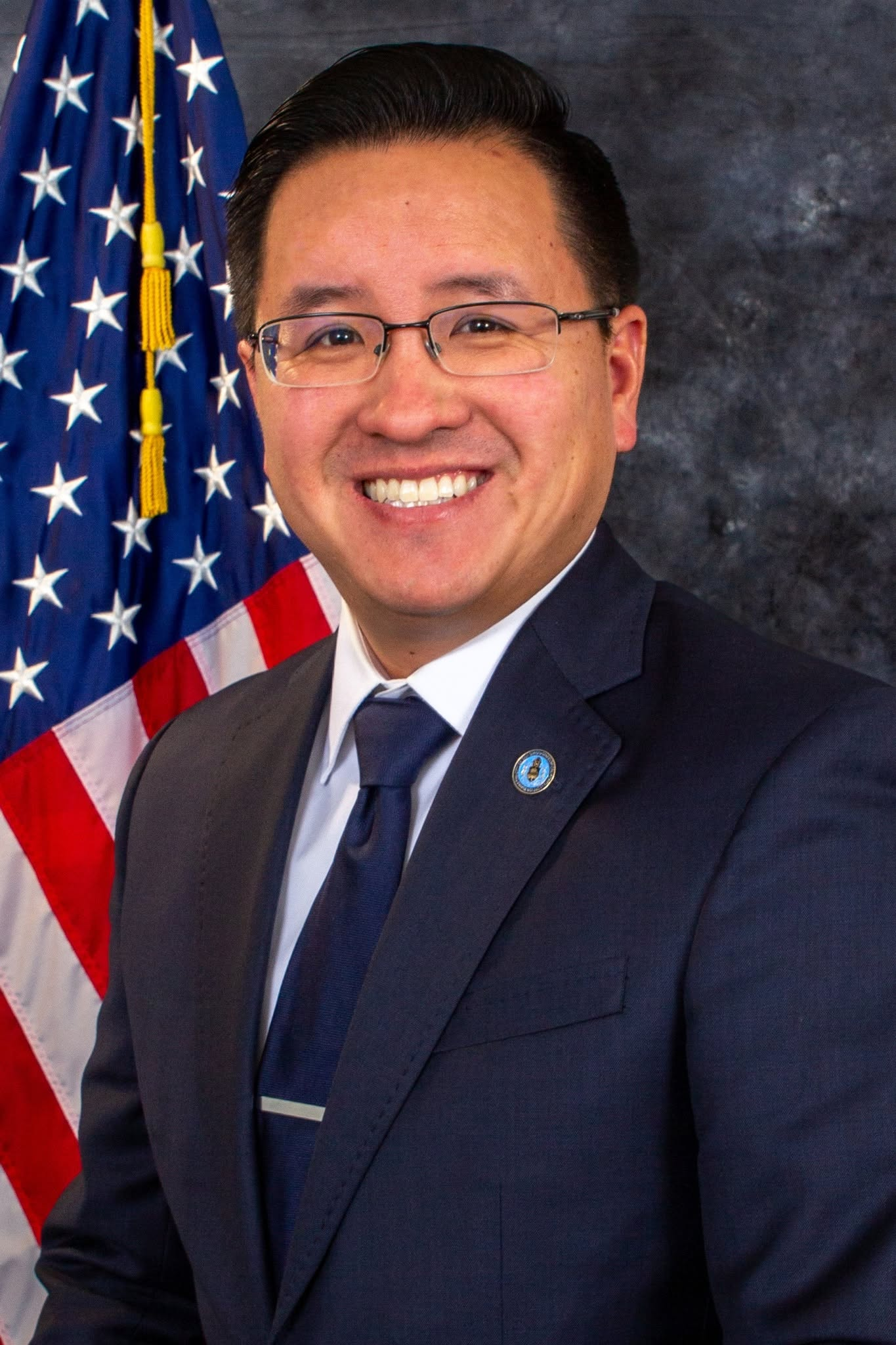

President pro tempore of the San Diego City Council
- Incumbent
- Assumed office December 17, 2024
- Preceded by: Joe LaCava

Member of the San Diego City Council from the 6th district
- Incumbent
- Assumed office December 12, 2022
- Preceded by: Chris Cate

Personal details
- Party: Democratic
- Education: University of California, San Diego (BA, BS)

Kent Lee is an American politician serving as the president pro tempore of the San Diego City Council since 2024. A member of the Democratic Party, he has represented District 6 on the city council since 2022.

Lee represents the neighborhoods of Miramar, Mira Mesa, and parts of Rancho Peñasquitos.

== Early life and education ==
Lee was born in West Covina, California, to Chinese immigrants from Vietnam and Myanmar. He attended high school in Orange County before moving to San Diego for college. He was a member of Alpha Phi Omega fraternity and graduated from the University of California San Diego in 2007, double majoring with a Bachelor of Arts in economics and a Bachelor of Science in general biology.

== Career ==
Lee worked as the Director of Development & Marketing for the Boy Scouts of America's San Diego-Imperial Council. He served as the executive director for Pacific Arts Movement, a nonprofit media arts organization which coordinates the San Diego Asian Film Festival.

He has stated that his top policy priorities are addressing homelessness, housing attainability, and infrastructure and transit. As a member of the City Council of San Diego, he serves as a non-voting board member of the North County Transit District, which operates Coaster, Sprinter, and bus service in Northern San Diego County.

== Personal life ==
Lee and his wife, Phuong, have two children and live in the Mira Mesa neighborhood of San Diego.
