= Talmadge, San Diego =

Human settlement in California, US

Coordinates: 32.764°N 117.09°W

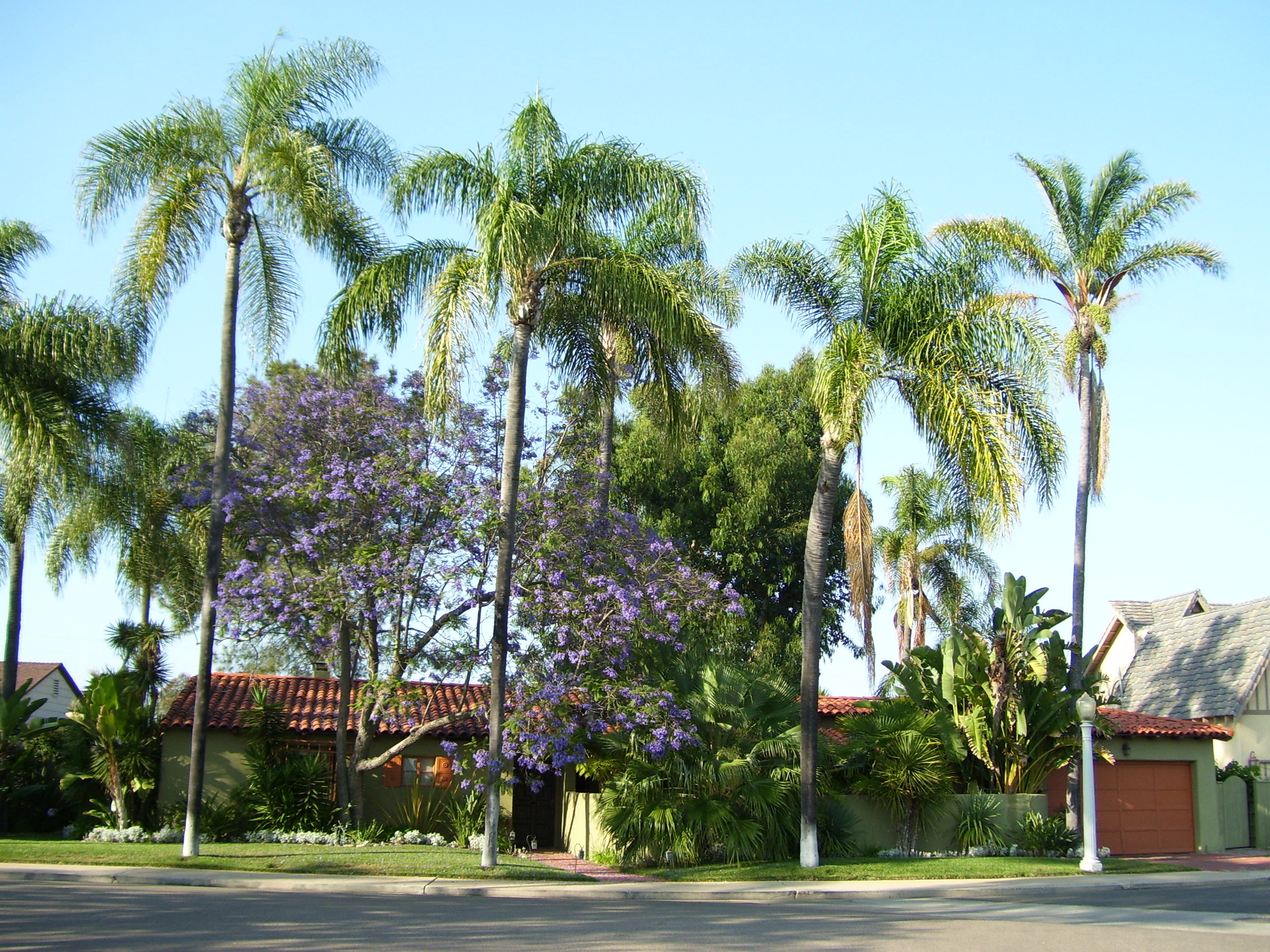
A Spanish Revival style home in Talmadge

Talmadge is a historically designated neighborhood of the mid-city region of San Diego, California. Its borders are defined differently by various planning agencies, but typically include Fairmount Avenue to the west, Montezuma Road to the north, Collwood Boulevard or 51st Street to the east, and Monroe Avenue or El Cajon Boulevard to the South.

Originally called Talmadge Park, the community was developed by the Southern California Realty Association, which was financed by a number of Hollywood figures. One of these was producer Joseph M. Schenck, and the development was named for his wife, actress Norma Talmadge, and her sisters Constance and Natalie. The neighborhood has streets named for each sister.

The architecture in Talmadge is eclectic, with styles including Spanish Revival, California bungalows, Cape Cod cottages and Normandy Style homes. Cliff May, a renowned Southern California architect, designed several homes in Talmadge. Kensington and Talmadge are sometimes grouped together as one community for official purposes, and they are part of the same community planning area.

The original boundaries of Talmadge were listed on the National Register of Historic Places on March 25, 2024 as the Talmadge Park Estates Historic District.
