= Jennifer Campbell (politician) =

American politician (born 1945)

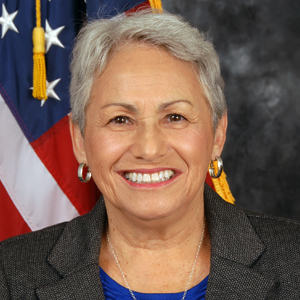

President of the San Diego City Council
- In office December 10, 2020 – December 6, 2021
- Mayor: Todd Gloria
- Preceded by: Georgette Gomez
- Succeeded by: Sean Elo-Rivera

Member of the San Diego City Council from District 2
- Incumbent
- Assumed office December 10, 2018
- Mayor: Kevin Faulconer; Todd Gloria
- Preceded by: Lorie Zapf

Personal details
- Born: c. 1945 (age 80–81)
- Party: Democratic
- Education: George Washington University; University of Pittsburgh (MD)
- Website: District website

Jennifer Campbell (born c. 1945) is an American politician and retired physician serving as a member of the San Diego City Council since 2018, representing District 2. A member of the Democratic Party, she served as president of the city council from 2020 to 2021.

Campbell represents the neighborhoods of Bay Park, Morena, Midway, Mission Beach, Clairemont, Ocean Beach, and Point Loma.

== Early life and education ==
Campbell was raised in Colorado. According to the San Diego Union Tribune, Campbell dropped out of George Washington University and later returned to college at the University of Pittsburgh, eventually earning the degree of Doctor of Medicine.

== Career ==
Campbell practiced family medicine in Pittsburgh for a few decades, where she also learned holistic medicine and acupuncture. After moving to San Diego she became a part-time teacher of integrative medicine at the Pacific College of Oriental Medicine.

=== San Diego City Council ===
==== Election ====
In August 2017 Campbell registered as one of five challengers to incumbent District 2 councilmember Lorie Zapf. In the June 2018 primary Zapf got 44.6% of the vote, more than twice anyone else's total but not enough to win election outright, so that she and Campbell faced a November 2018 runoff election. Their general election contest became "San Diego's most hotly contested City Council race", with heavy spending by local labor unions in favor of Campbell and by local business groups supporting Zapf. In the November election Campbell defeated Zapf, 56% to 44%. Her election gave Democrats a 6–3 majority on the city council.

==== Recall campaign ====
A recall campaign was officially initiated against Campbell February 3, 2021. Proponents of the recall claim that Campbell has made decisions contradictory to promises she has made to constituents. The only candidate that announced a campaign to replace Campbell, in the recall election, was San Diego public servant and child abuse victim advocate, Loxie Gant.

"Many of the complaints against Campbell are as a result of what critics describe as a too-lenient attitude toward vacation rentals and her support for a ballot measure allowing developers to exceed a long-standing 30-foot height limit in the dilapidated Midway neighborhood that is home to many strip clubs."

"Leaders of the campaign include five prominent civic leaders from each neighborhood in Campbell’s district: Kevin Hastings, vice chair of the Ocean Beach Planning Board; Cathie Umemoto, a director on the Pacific Beach Town Council Board of Directors; Mandy Havlik, board member and secretary of the Peninsula Community Planning Board; Erin Cullen, board member of the Clairemont Community Planning Group; and Gary Wonacott, former president of Mission Beach Town Council."

According to The San Diego Union Tribune, as of April 6, 2021, "The recall campaign against San Diego Councilwoman Dr. Jennifer Campbell has gathered more than 5,000 signatures, putting the effort on pace to meet the 14,421 signatures required by early June."

==== Building height controversy ====
After pledging to protect the long-standing 30-foot height limit, overwhelmingly approved by voters in 1972, Campbell reversed course on her campaign promise by co-sponsoring a memo that would ultimately lead to that law being overturned.

According to the San Diego Union Tribune on December 14, 2021, "Judge Katherine Bacal sided with petitioner Save Our Access, determining that the city should have studied the environmental impacts of taller buildings before putting Measure E in front of voters. The judge granted the nonprofit’s request for a writ of mandate, an act that invalidates the measure and bars the city from striking the Midway District from the coastal zone."

==== Redistricting controversy ====
On December 3, 2021, the watchdog group Community Advocates for Just and Moral Governance filed a letter with Office of the City Attorney alleging that "...Campbell's senior policy advisor, Seamus Kennedy, had a hand in crafting the boundaries of Campbell's own District 2, as it appears in the map currently under consideration by commissioners," regarding the mandatory redistricting effort. The group further alleges, in the letter, that "On October 20, 2021, Seamus Kennedy, who is Council President Jennifer Campbell’s current Senior Policy Advisor and former campaign manager, submitted a map via the 7 8 online portal wherein Council President Jennifer Campbell’s residence was placed back into District 2..." in order to advantage her in the upcoming 2022 general election.

==== Council President vote ====
On December 7, 2021, Campbell was not re-elected as the San Diego City Council President. When nominated for re-election by Councilmember Whitburn, Campbell lost the vote 5–4. Following this vote, District 9 Councilmember Sean Elo-Rivera was nominated for Council President by District 8 Councilmember Vivian Moreno. Elo-Rivera was confirmed in a 8–1 vote, with Campbell casting the lone dissent.

== Personal life ==
Dr. Jen and her partner, Suzanne, have 9 grandchildren and 2 great-grandsons and live in the Bay Ho neighborhood of San Diego.
