= Rolando, San Diego =

Neighborhood in San Diego, California, United States

Coordinates: 32°45′43.16″N 117°03′40.30″W

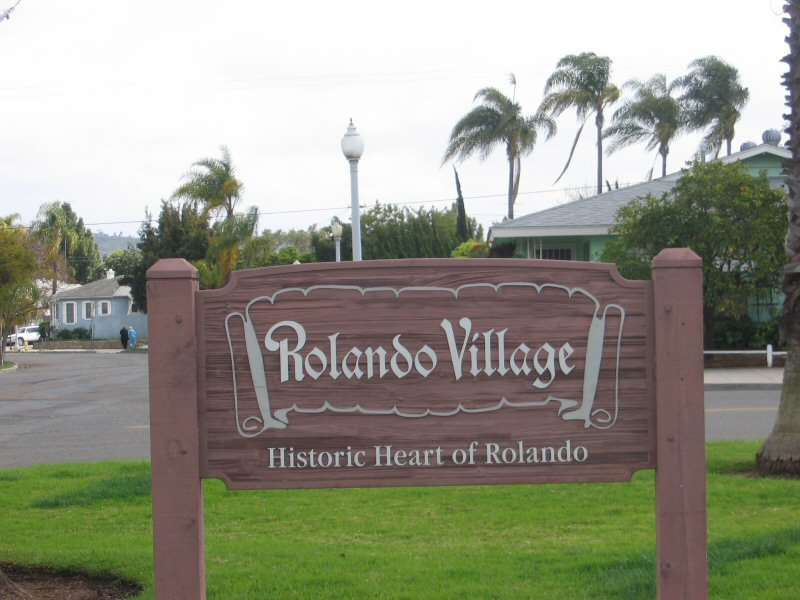
Rolando Village

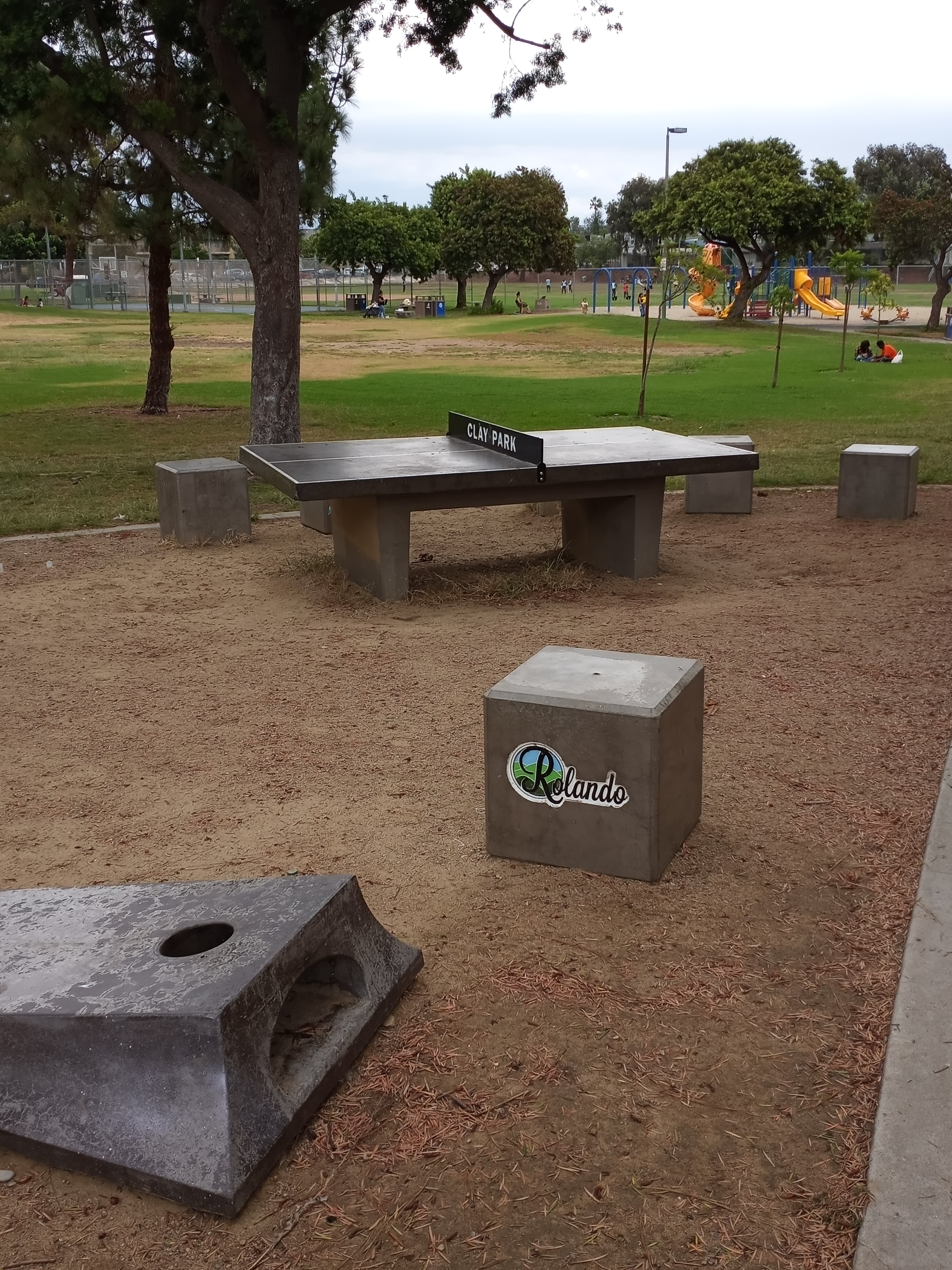
View from Southwest Corner of the former Clay Park in 2022 | Foreground: Cornhole and Table Tennis equipment; Background: Playground, Basketball Court; Far Background: Baseball Field hosting a San Diego Cricket Association Match

Rolando is a neighborhood of the Mid-City region of San Diego, California. Rolando is mostly residential with the exception of El Cajon Boulevard, which features the Campus Plaza shopping center. Rolando is divided by University Avenue into two sections: Rolando Village to the north, and Rolando Park to the south.

== Geography ==
Rolando Village's borders are defined by College Avenue to the West, El Cajon Boulevard to the North, and University Avenue to the South. The eastern border with La Mesa, and is defined by several residential streets which lie between 67th and 73rd streets.

Rolando Park's borders are defined by College Avenue to the West, University Avenue to the north, the 94 freeway to the south, and the City of La Mesa boundary to the east.

Eight decorative public walkways known as "Catwalks" for pedestrians and joggers to travel between neighborhood streets are spread throughout Rolando.

== History ==
The area known as Rolando, San Diego was designated as ranch land for Mission San Diego de Alcalá by the Spanish provincial administration. In 1846, following the secularization of the mission system by the Mexican government, Don Santiago Argüello was granted the Rolando area. However, due to confusion over land titling arising from the Mexican-American War, the area remained unpartitioned for sale until 1885.

Amidst California's rapid growth in the mid-1920s, Rolando gained attention as prime real estate when the city announced the paving of University Avenue from Euclid Avenue to La Mesa.

In 1949, the Rolando Village Company, later renamed the Lincoln Homes Company, partnered with local contractor/developer Chris Cosgrove to commence development in the area. Rolando Park tract homes were swiftly constructed to meet the soaring demand for housing in Post-War San Diego.

The 1950s brought forth concerns regarding school districts, infrastructure, and annexation. Rolando Park Elementary was established in 1951 and later sold to San Diego Unified School District in 1955.

In 1951, Robert O. Peterson opened the first Jack in the Box at 63rd Street and El Cajon Boulevard, pioneering the concept of a drive-thru restaurant with a two-way intercom.

Residents of the former unincorporated area of Rolando Park voted to join the City of San Diego instead of La Mesa, leading to annexation in 1954 along with the sister community of Rolando.

In December 2022, the Andrew Jackson Post Office in Rolando was renamed to former U.S. Representative Susan A. Davis Post Office following a petition sent to Davis's successor Sara Jacobs inspired by an international effort after the murder of George Floyd to rename monuments named after historical figures with a history of slavery and indigenous oppression.

In 2024, Henry Clay Elementary School and Clay Neighborhood Park in Rolando were renamed for similar reasons.

== Education ==
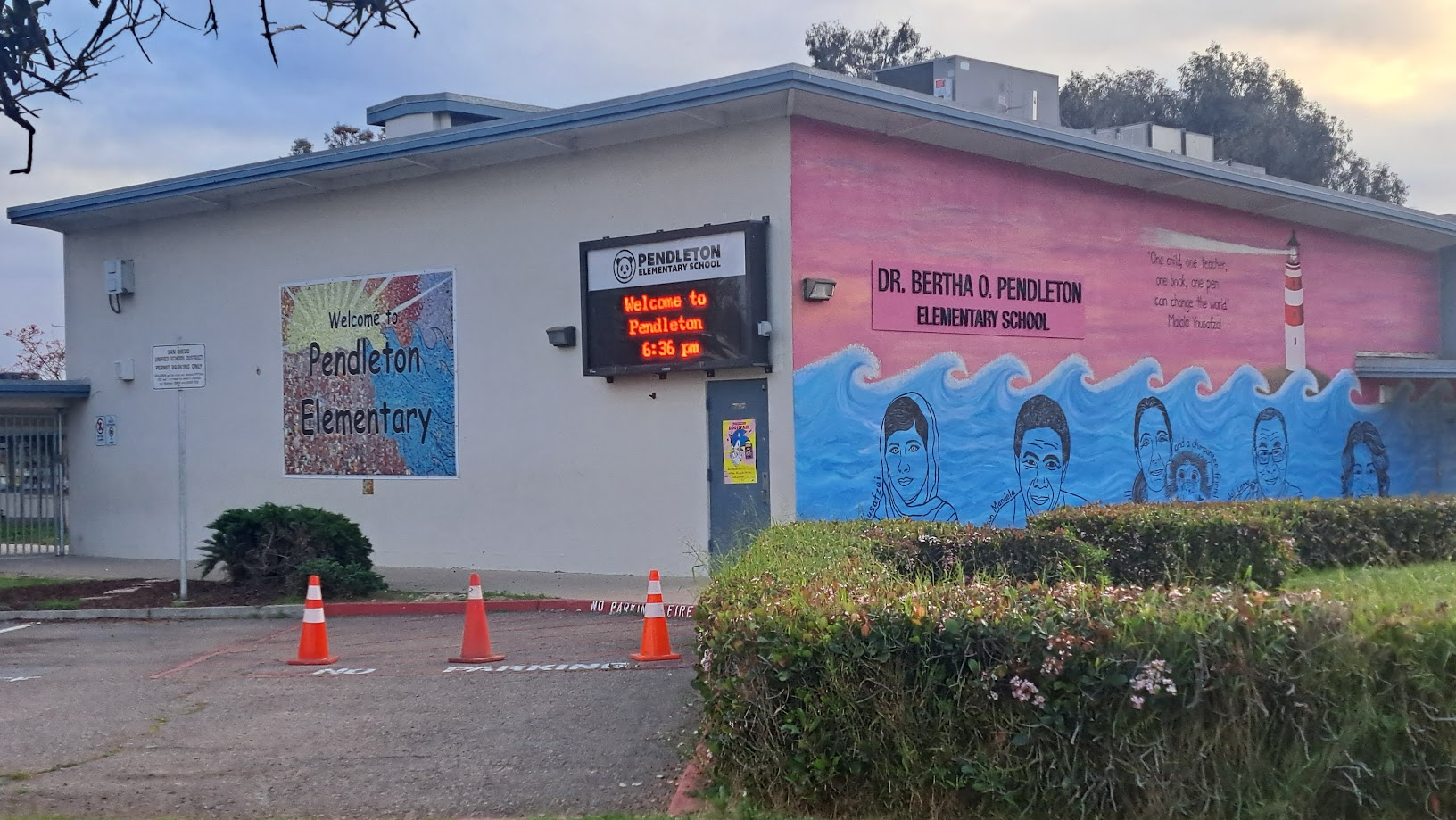
Pendleton Elementary School in April 2025

Rolando hosts two public elementary schools, one in Rolando Village and one in Rolando Park, both part of the San Diego Unified School District:

- Dr. Bertha O. Pendleton Elementary School (formerly Henry Clay Elementary School)
- Rolando Park Elementary School

Pendelton Elementary shares fields with Clay Neighborhood Park in a joint-use agreement between San Diego Unified and San Diego Parks & Recreation.
