= List of communities and neighborhoods of San Diego =

The following is a list of neighborhoods and communities located in the city of San Diego. The City of San Diego Planning Department officially lists 52 Community Planning Areas within the city, many of which consist of multiple different neighborhoods.

== Alphabetical ==
- Allied Gardens
- Alta Vista
- Balboa Park
- Bankers Hill
- Barrio Logan
- Bay Ho
- Bay Park
- Bay Terraces
  - North Bay Terrace
  - South Bay Terrace
- Birdland
- Black Mountain Ranch
- Broadway Heights
- Carmel Mountain Ranch
- Carmel Valley
- Chollas View
- City Heights
  - Azalea Park
  - Castle
  - Cherokee Point
  - Chollas Creek
  - Colina del Sol
  - Corridor
  - Fairmount Park
    - Gateway
    - Bay Ridge
  - Fairmount Village
  - Fox Canyon
  - Hollywood Park
  - Islenair
  - Ridgeview
  - Swan Canyon
  - Teralta East
  - Teralta West
- Clairemont (Clairemont Mesa)
  - Clairemont Mesa East
  - Clairemont Mesa West
  - North Clairemont
- College Area
  - Alvarado Estates
  - College East
  - College West
- Del Cerro
- Del Mar Heights
- Del Mar Mesa
- Downtown
  - Columbia
  - Core
  - Cortez Hill
  - East Village
  - Gaslamp Quarter
  - Harborview
  - Little Italy
  - Marina
- Egger Highlands
- El Cerrito
- Emerald Hills
- Encanto
- Fairbanks Ranch Country Club
- Golden Hill
- Grant Hill
- Grantville
- Harbor Island
- Hillcrest
  - Marston Hills
- Jamacha
- Kearny Mesa
- Kensington
- La Jolla
  - Beach Barber Tract
  - Bird Rock
  - Country Club
  - Hidden Valley
  - La Jolla Alta
  - La Jolla Farms
  - La Jolla Heights
  - La Jolla Mesa
  - La Jolla Shores
  - La Jolla Village
  - Lower Hermosa
  - Muirlands
  - Muirlands West
  - Soledad South
  - Upper Hermosa
  - Village of La Jolla
- La Mesa
- Lake Murray
- Liberty Station
- Lincoln Park
- Linda Vista
- Logan Heights
  - Memorial
- Lomita Village
- Middletown
- Midway
- Mira Mesa
- Miramar
- Miramar Ranch North
- Mission Bay Park
- Mission Beach
- Mission Hills
- Mission Valley
  - Mission Valley East
    - Civita
  - Mission Valley West
    - Hotel Circle
- Morena
- Mount Hope
- Mountain View
- Navajo
- Nestor
- Normal Heights
  - Cherokee Park
  - Adams North
  - Adams Park
- North Park
  - Altadena
  - Burlingame
  - Montclair
- O'Farrell (South Encanto)
- Oak Park
- Ocean Beach
- Ocean View Hills
- Old Town
- Otay Mesa
- Otay Mesa West
- Pacific Beach
- Pacific Highlands Ranch
- Palm City
- Paradise Hills
- Point Loma
  - Fleet Ridge
  - La Playa
  - Loma Portal
  - Point Loma Heights
    - Loma Alta
    - Loma Palisades
    - Ocean Beach Highlands
    - Point Loma Highlands
  - Roseville
  - Wooded Area
- Rancho Bernardo
- Rancho Encantada (Stonebridge)
- Rancho Peñasquitos
- Redwood Village
- Rolando
  - Rolando Park
  - Rolando Village
- Sabre Springs
- San Carlos
- San Pasqual Valley
- San Ysidro
- Scripps Ranch
- Serra Mesa
- Shelltown
- Shelter Island
- Sherman Heights
- Skyline
- Sorrento Valley
  - Sorrento Mesa
- South Park
- Southcrest
- Stockton
- Sunset Cliffs
- Talmadge
- Tierrasanta
- Tijuana River Valley
- Torrey Highlands
- Torrey Hills
- Torrey Pines
- University City
- University Heights
- Valencia Park
- Via de la Valle
- Webster

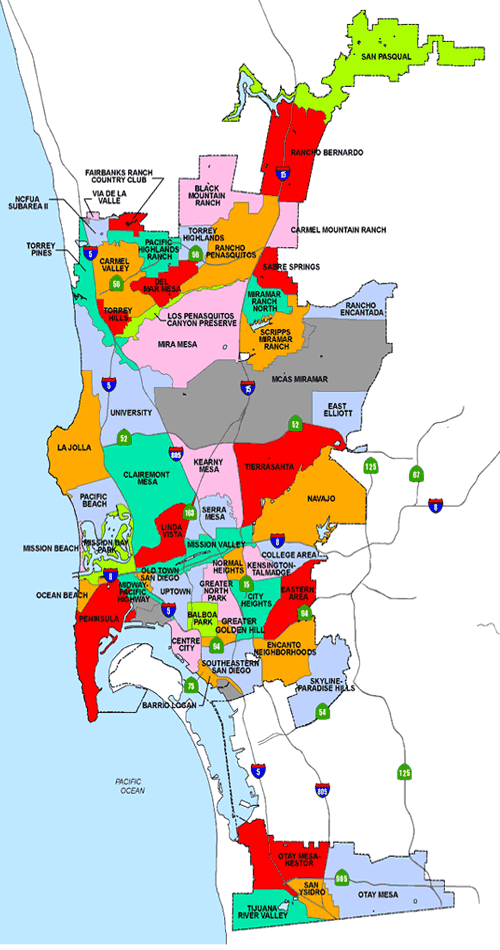
Map of San Diego Community Planning Areas

== By city council district ==
=== Northwestern (District 1) ===
- Carmel Valley
- Del Mar Heights
- Del Mar Mesa
- Fairbanks Ranch Country Club
- La Jolla
  - Beach Barber Tract
  - Bird Rock
  - Country Club
  - Hidden Valley
  - La Jolla Alta
  - La Jolla Farms
  - La Jolla Heights
  - La Jolla Mesa
  - La Jolla Shores
  - La Jolla Village
  - Lower Hermosa
  - Muirlands
  - Muirlands West
  - Soledad South
  - Upper Hermosa
  - Village of La Jolla
- Pacific Beach
- Pacific Highlands Ranch
- Torrey Hills
- Torrey Pines
- Via de la Valle

=== Western (District 2) ===
- Bay Ho
- Bay Park
- Harbor Island
- Liberty Station
- Midway
- Mission Bay Park
- Mission Beach
- Morena
- Ocean Beach
- Point Loma
  - Fleet Ridge
  - La Playa
  - Loma Portal
  - Point Loma Heights
    - Loma Alta
    - Loma Palisades
    - Ocean Beach Highlands
    - Point Loma Highlands
  - Roseville
  - Wooded Area
- Shelter Island
- Sunset Cliffs

=== Central (District 3) ===
- Balboa Park
- Bankers Hill
- Downtown
  - Columbia
  - Core
  - Cortez Hill
  - East Village
  - Gaslamp Quarter
  - Harborview
  - Little Italy
  - Marina
- Golden Hill
- Hillcrest
  - Marston Hills
- Middletown
- Mission Hills
- Mission Valley West
  - Civita
  - Hotel Circle
- Normal Heights
  - Cherokee Park
  - Adams North
  - Adams Park
- North Park
  - Altadena
  - Burlingame
  - Montclair
- Old Town
- South Park
- University Heights

=== Southeastern (District 4) ===
- Alta Vista
- Bay Terraces
  - North Bay Terrace
  - South Bay Terrace
- Broadway Heights
- Chollas View
- Emerald Hills
- Encanto
- Jamacha
- Lincoln Park
- Lomita Village
- Mountain View
- O'Farrell (South Encanto)
- Oak Park
- Paradise Hills
- Redwood Village
- Ridgeview
- Rolando Park
- Valencia Park
- Webster

=== Northeastern (District 5) ===
- Black Mountain Ranch
- Carmel Mountain
- Miramar Ranch North
- Rancho Bernardo
- Rancho Encantada (Stonebridge)
- Rancho Peñasquitos
- Sabre Springs
- San Pasqual Valley
- Scripps Ranch
- Torrey Highlands

=== Northern (District 6) ===
- Clairemont
  - Clairemont Mesa East
  - Clairemont Mesa West
  - North Clairemont
- Kearny Mesa
- Mira Mesa
- Miramar
- Sorrento Valley
  - Sorrento Mesa
- University City

=== Eastern (District 7) ===
- Allied Gardens
- Birdland
- Del Cerro
- Grantville
- Lake Murray
- Linda Vista
- Mission Valley East
- San Carlos
- Serra Mesa
- Tierrasanta

=== Southern & South (District 8) ===
Southern:

- Barrio Logan
- Grant Hill
- Logan Heights
  - Memorial
- Shelltown
- Sherman Heights
- Southcrest

South:

- Egger Highlands
- Nestor
- Ocean View Hills
- Otay Mesa
- Otay Mesa West
- Palm City
- San Ysidro
- Tijuana River Valley

=== Mid-City (District 9) ===
- City Heights
  - Azalea Park
  - Castle
  - Cherokee Point
  - Chollas Creek
  - Colina del Sol
  - Corridor
  - Fairmount Park
    - Gateway
    - Bay Ridge
  - Fairmount Village
  - Fox Canyon
  - Hollywood Park
  - Islenair
  - Ridgeview
  - Swan Canyon
  - Teralta East
  - Teralta West
- College Area
  - Alvarado Estates
  - College East
  - College West
- El Cerrito
- Kensington
- Mount Hope
- Rolando Village
- Stockton
- Talmadge

== See also ==
- Category:San Diego
- Category:Neighborhoods in San Diego County, California
- Category:Urban communities in San Diego
- Category:Neighborhoods in San Diego
