= Point Loma Heights, San Diego =

Coordinates: 32.74390°N 117.2326°W

Point Loma Heights
- Neighborhood of San Diego
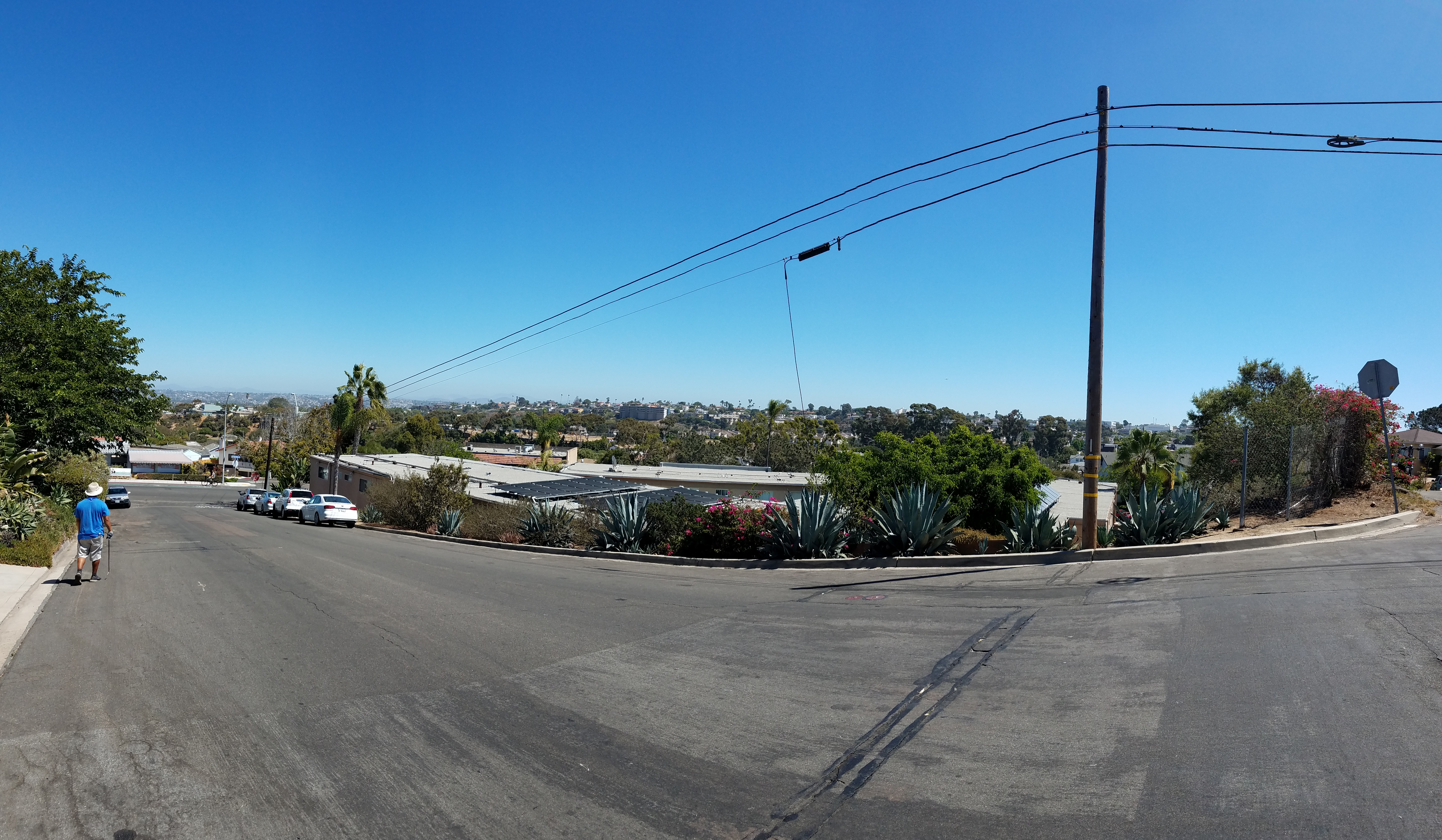
- Panoramic view over Nimitz Boulevard
- Interactive map of Point Loma Heights
- Country: United States
- State: California
- County: San Diego
- City: San Diego

Point Loma Heights is a neighborhood in Point Loma, a community of San Diego, California. It is bounded by Froude Street on the west, Point Loma Avenue and Chatsworth Boulevard on the south, Nimitz Boulevard on the east and Midway Drive and the San Diego River on the north. Neighboring communities are Ocean Beach to the west, Sunset Cliffs and Roseville-Fleetridge to the south, Loma Portal to the east, and Midway and Mission Bay Park to the north.

Major thoroughfares within the neighborhood include Catalina and Nimitz Boulevards, Narragansett Avenue, and Voltaire Street.

The neighborhood is largely residential, with older single-family housing neighboring Ocean Beach and along the Catalina Boulevard corridor, and multi-family housing in the northern part of the neighborhood. Commercial districts are along West Point Loma Boulevard and Voltaire Street. The community planning document for the broader Point Loma community divides Point Loma Heights into several subdivisions: Loma Palisades, Loma Alta, Point Loma Highlands, and Ocean Beach Highlands.
