= California State Route 209 =

Former highway in California

State Route 209

- Former SR 209 highlighted in red

Route information
- Maintained by Caltrans
- Length: 8 mi (13 km)
- Existed: 1964–2003

Major junctions
- South end: Cabrillo National Monument in Point Loma
- North end: I-5 / I-8 in San Diego

Location
- Country: United States
- State: California
- Counties: San Diego

Highway system
- State highways in California; Interstate; US; State; Scenic; History; Pre‑1964; Unconstructed; Deleted; Freeways
← SR 207	→ I-210

State Route 209 (SR 209) was a state highway in the U.S. state of California, connecting Cabrillo National Monument with the interchange of Interstate 5 (I-5) and I-8 in San Diego, passing through the neighborhoods of Point Loma. The majority of the route was along Rosecrans Street; it also included Cañon Street and Catalina Boulevard leading to the tip of Point Loma.

The Rosecrans Street portion of SR 209 corresponded to the original routing of the historic La Playa Trail. Rosecrans Street was paved in the late 19th century through the community of Roseville, and was added to the state highway system in 1933 as Route 12. SR 209 was designated in the 1964 state highway renumbering, and a full interchange with I-5 and I-8 was completed in 1969. The designation was removed from the state highway system in 2003 and responsibility for the road was transferred to the city of San Diego.

== Route description ==
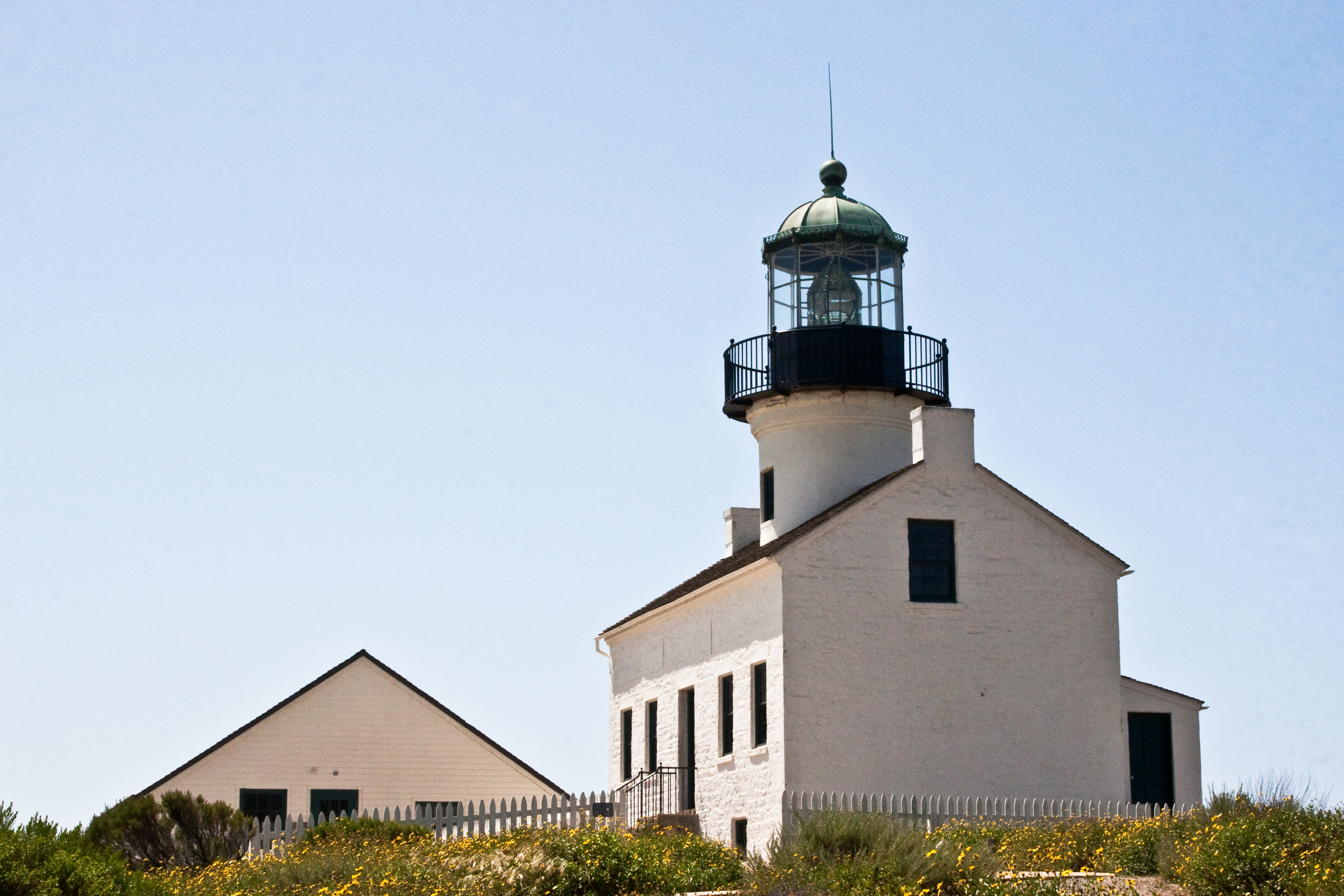
Old Point Loma Lighthouse

The route began at a turnaround next to the Old Point Loma Lighthouse in Cabrillo National Monument, near the southern tip of Point Loma. Heading north along the crest of the Point Loma peninsula, it passed through Fort Rosecrans Military Reservation and Fort Rosecrans National Cemetery before exiting the former through a gate and entering the Wooded Area neighborhood of Point Loma as Catalina Boulevard. SR 209 passed through this residential neighborhood and provided access to Point Loma Nazarene University. The SR 209 designation then made a right turn onto Cañon Street, curved to the southeast, and went downhill to the bayside location of the old La Playa Trail. At the intersection with Rosecrans Street, the designation made a turn to the northeast at a right angle onto Rosecrans.

As it continued northeast through the Roseville and Loma Portal neighborhoods, SR 209 intersected both Harbor Boulevard and Nimitz Boulevard before passing along the northwestern edge of Naval Training Center San Diego (now closed and redeveloped as Liberty Station) and providing access to Marine Corps Recruit Depot San Diego at Barnett Street. SR 209 continued from Midway Drive northeast to the intersection of Sports Arena Boulevard and Camino del Rio West, where the highway continued north onto the latter, terminating at the ramps leading into the interchange with I-5 and I-8.

In 1996, SR 209 had an annual average daily traffic (AADT) of 2,600 vehicles at the southern end in Cabrillo National Monument, and 61,000 vehicles at the northern end at the I-5/I-8 junction, the latter of which was the highest AADT for the highway.

== History ==
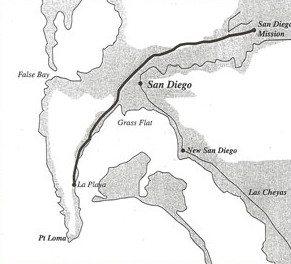
United States Boundary Survey of the San Diego area, 1850, showing the La Playa Trail from La Playa to Old San Diego and the Mission

The Rosecrans Street portion of the highway followed the route of the historic La Playa Trail, the oldest European trail on the west coast, which connected the Spanish settlements in Old Town and Mission San Diego de Alcala with the ship loading and unloading area at La Playa.

In February 1907, a petition to construct a railway line along Rosecrans Street from 38th Street to MacAuley Street was introduced to the San Diego City Council. By July, work was to begin on grading Rosecrans Street through what was known as the city of Roseville in preparation for construction of the Point Loma Electric Railway line. The work was briefly disrupted due to a labor dispute, but by June 1908, two miles (3.2 km) of the 2.5 miles (4.0 km) had been paved. By March 1909, railroad tracks were being placed along Rosecrans Street. The city assumed maintenance of the road on May 1, after it had been paved from Tide Street to Ocean Beach. Private citizens paid for over $100,000 of the costs, and the city was to pay for $12,000, according to an agreement made in 1904. However, by December the bill had not been paid by the city due to a lack of funds, and the construction company filed a claim; on December 29, the city agreed to pay $12,000, using funds from the water department.

The termination of the Point Loma streetcar line was considered in 1923, but the San Diego Electric Railway decided to keep it running after residents opposed the idea of using buses instead. However, by 1946, bus lines were in place on Rosecrans Street, and a petition for increased bus service to Point Loma was given to the city in October 1947.

The new divided highway known as Rosecrans Boulevard from Lytton Street to Canon Street was dedicated on June 5, 1940, and was a part of the state highway system extending to Cabrillo National Monument, which served as the western end of Legislative Route 12. Before this project, it was a two-lane road that had issues such as traffic congestion and flooding. A monument marking La Playa Trail at Avenida de Portugal and Rosecrans Street that had been installed in 1934 was removed by the construction in the 1940s; however, a replacement was installed in 2010. Another of the six monuments was moved out of the median near the Midway Drive intersection to a commercial area that same year. During the 1950s, the route from Lytton Street and Rosecrans Street to Pacific Highway was considered a part of US 80.

SR 209 was designated in the 1964 state highway renumbering. Plans for an interchange between I-5, I-8, SR 209, and SR 109 date from 1965, although several concerns had to be taken into account, including the preservation of historical Old Town and keeping traffic through the area moving during construction. The goal was to begin construction in 1966, and complete the interchange in 1969. There were concerns about a $3 billion shortfall in funding during May 1966, which caused the San Diego Chamber of Commerce Highway Committee to recommend the completion of SR 109 as a project.

Construction had begun on September 22, 1966, and the interchange was to replace the intersection of Pacific Highway and Rosecrans Street. The cost of the interchange was projected to be $10.86 million. The eight-lane freeway was projected to relieve traffic in the Frontier Street area coming from the San Diego Sports Arena. Completion of both the interchange and SR 109 was planned for early 1969. The ramp from south I-5 to Camino del Rio opened in February 1968, with the remainder of the project to be completed in summer 1969. The entire project was completed in September, with the road scheduled to open in October; just a few months before, the routing of SR 209 had been determined. The routing of SR 109 was officially added to I-8 in 1972.

In 1971, there was a state proposal to remove SR 209 from the state highway system, which the City of San Diego objected to. However, SR 209 was deleted from the system in 2003, and had been given to the City of San Diego in 2001.

== Major intersections ==
Except where prefixed with a letter, postmiles were measured on the road as it was in 1964, based on the alignment that existed at the time, and do not necessarily reflect current mileage. R reflects a realignment in the route since then, M indicates a second realignment, L refers to an overlap due to a correction or change, and T indicates postmiles classified as temporary. Segments that remain unconstructed or have been relinquished to local control may be omitted. The entire route was in San Diego, San Diego County.

Postmile	Destinations	Notes
0.21	Cabrillo National Monument	
4.68	Rosecrans Street, Canon Street	
5.05	Harbor Drive – San Diego International Airport, Harbor Island	
5.27	Nimitz Boulevard	
7.29	Rosecrans Street, Pacific Highway, Sports Arena Boulevard – Mission Bay Park	
R7.76	I-5 north (San Diego Freeway) – Los Angeles	Interchange; northbound exit and southbound entrance
R7.76	I-8 east – El Centro	Interchange; northbound exit and southbound entrance
1.000 mi = 1.609 km; 1.000 km = 0.621 mi: Incomplete access
