= La Playa Trail =

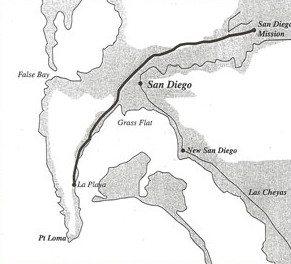
United States Boundary Survey of the San Diego, California area, 1850, showing La Playa Trail from La Playa to Old San Diego and the Mission

La Playa Trail was a historic bayside trail in San Diego, connecting the settled inland areas to the commercial anchorage at Old La Playa on San Diego Bay. (La Playa means "the beach" in Spanish.) La Playa Trail has been recognized as the oldest commercial trail in the Western United States. The trail was used during the pre-Hispanic (Native American), Spanish, Mexican and American periods of San Diego history. Much of the length of the original trail corresponds to the current Rosecrans Street in the San Diego neighborhood of Point Loma (originally called La Punta de la Loma de San Diego meaning Hill Point of San Diego, later partially anglicized to Point Loma). There are eight registered National Historic Districts and 70 identified historic sites along the trail, according to the La Playa Trail Association, which was formed in 2005 to recognize the historic nature of the trail and to honor the many different peoples who traveled along it.

The trail was already established by the time the Spanish settlers arrived in 1769; the first inhabitants of the area, including the Kumeyaay tribe, used it to access the beaches of San Diego Bay. It was improved and extended during the Spanish colonization of the region, reaching Old Town San Diego and Mission San Diego de Alcalá in Mission Valley by the 1770s. Cargo which had been unloaded by ship at Ballast Point in Old La Playa was transported along the trail several miles inland to Old Town. La Playa Trail remained the primary transportation route for imports and exports from the time of San Diego's establishment in 1769 until the development of a better port in the 1860s at what is now downtown San Diego. After most port activities moved to the downtown location, the southern portion of the trail retained its commercial character and became known as Rosecrans Boulevard (now Rosecrans Street).

In 1934, six commemorative terra cotta plaques were placed along the length of the trail by the local chapter of the Daughters of the American Revolution and other groups, based on a relief designed by sculptor Rose M. Hanks. The original six were located at Mission San Diego de Alcala; at the foot of Presidio Hill in Old Town; near the intersection of Rosecrans St. and Midway Blvd. in the Midway area; at the corner of Rosecrans and Lytton streets in Loma Portal, across from the Naval Training Center San Diego golf course; at the corner of Rosecrans and Byron streets in Roseville; and at the site of the fuel depot at Naval Base Point Loma. By the early 2000s, only four plaques survived. The marker in the Roseville area, which was dedicated in 1934 but then lost when the street was widened, was recreated and rededicated in 2010. The marker in the Midway area, formerly on the center median of Rosecrans Street near Midway Drive, was refurbished in 2005 and relocated to a more accessible sidewalk location in 2010.

A portion of the trail (as Rosecrans Boulevard) was expanded into a four-lane divided highway in 1940. Rosecrans was identified as part of California State Route 209 from 1964 to 2003. The southern terminus of the trail is now located within Naval Base Point Loma.
