= North City, San Diego =

Neighborhood in San Diego, California

Coordinates: 32°58′23.66″N 117°14′17.58″W

North City is a neighborhood in San Diego, California, bordered by Solana Beach and Rancho Santa Fe to the north, Del Mar Heights to the west, and Carmel Valley to the south. I-5 forms the western boundary. The name is almost never used by local residents as the area is already included in either Rancho Santa Fe or Carmel Valley. The name is almost exclusively used by the San Diego Police Department for zoning.

== History ==
=== Kumeyaay (Ipai) Village of Ahwel-Awa ===
Native American Kumeyaay history within the area has been documented to 7,000 years ago, which was adjacent to a Kumeyaay village west of El Camino Real near the San Dieguito River in North City at the time of European contact with the Spanish known as Ahwel-Awa or ‘aqwilawa, meaning "twine house". The Portolá expedition in 1769, described it as "a large village... and many well built houses with grass roofs". The village was referred to by various names by the Spanish such as Sellegua or Jellegua, and was given Christian names under Spanish rule such as San Jacome De la Marca, La Poza de Ozuna, or San Dieguito (name for the region).

Ahwel-Awa was the ancestral home of the Kwitlp clan of the Ipai-Kumeyaay people who spoke the Ipai dialect, and were one of the first Kumeyaay clans to convert to Catholicism in 1770s under the leadership of Jamacuain "Benito" Culip, who was the kwaapay (leader) of the clan.

==== Pueblo San Dieguito proposal ====
Under Mexican administration, the Kumeyaay village was removed to be land granted to Mexican settlers. The village was previously planned to be converted into the San Dieguito pueblo as a village dedicated to the Kumeyaay by Alta California governor Jose Figueroa, but never materialized after his assassination. This resulted in the relocation of the Kwitlp clan inland towards what is now the Mesa Grande Band of Diegueno Mission Indian reservation, under the Quilp surname.

After the Mexican–American War, the area has been largely used for agricultural and equestrian uses, which was a large producer of strawberries.

=== NCFUA Subarea-II ===
In the 1993, the City of San Diego designated the area as "NCFUA Subarea-II" as part of the larger North City Future Urbanizing Area plan which also included what is now Pacific Highlands Ranch, Torrey Highlands, and Black Mountain Ranch. The area has remained under 'Future Urbanizing' status due to the lack of development potential.

Between the 2000s and 2010s, the strawberry farmlands were converted to preservation land with efforts for environmental restoration as part of San Dieguito River Park. Homes were built south and east of El Camino Real, and churches such as St. Sarkis Armenian Church and Harvest Evangelical Church were built as well.
