= Swan Canyon, San Diego =

- Community of San Diego
- Swan Canyon
- Location in Central San Diego Swan Canyon, San Diego (California) Swan Canyon, San Diego (the United States)
- Coordinates: 32°45′N 117°10′W
- Country: United States of America
- State: California
- County: San Diego
- City: San Diego

Area
  - Total: 0.296 sq mi (0.77 km^{2})

Population (2011)
  - Total: 2,640
- ZIP Code: 92105

Swan Canyon is a neighborhood in the City Heights community of San Diego, California. It is bounded by Oak Park on the east, Hollywood Park on the west, Fairmount Village on the north and Ridgeview on the south. Swan Canyon occupies a total area of 0.296 square miles (77 ha). As of 2011, the total population was 2,640 in which 1,278 were male and 1,362 were female. Swan Canyon is part of the City Heights Community Plan Area. It is part of City Council District 9. Hamilton Elementary School is located in the neighborhood.

The neighborhood is named for Swan Canyon, a small (30 acres (12 ha)) canyon that runs through the middle of it in a north-to-south direction. The canyon is undeveloped and has sometimes been a focus for crime and transient encampments. The state of California's Coastal Conservancy has undertaken a project to restore the canyon so that it can provide usable open space, wildlife habitat, and educational resources. A monthly volunteer cleanup project is organized by San Diego Canyonlands, a local nonprofit organization.
