= Harborview =

Harborview may refer to a location in the United States:

- Harborview, Baltimore, Maryland, a neighborhood
- Harborview, San Diego, California, a neighborhood
- Harborview Medical Center, a public hospital in King County, Washington
