= Rolando Park, San Diego =

Coordinates: 32.749°N 117.055°W

Rolando Park is a neighborhood on the eastern edge of San Diego, California. It is bordered by College Avenue to the west, California State Route 94 to the south, the city of La Mesa to the east and University Avenue to the north. Rolando Park borders the San Diego neighborhoods of Rolando, Redwood Village, and Oak Park.

Rolando Park is a largely residential neighborhood, and was principally developed during the 1950s with tract housing. Rolando Park is a hilly neighborhood, a characteristic it shares with other neighborhoods in the area. The hills separate the residential areas from commercial areas along University Avenue.

The 1984 Olympic Torch Run passed through Rolando Park on University Avenue.
