= Richard Henry Dana School =

Schools named for Richard Henry Dana Jr. include:

- Richard Henry Dana Middle School (Arcadia), Arcadia, California
- Dana Middle School (San Diego), San Diego, California
- Richard Henry Dana Middle School (Hawthorne), Hawthorne, California
- Dana Middle School (San Pedro), San Pedro, California
