= Oak Park, California (disambiguation) =

Oak Park, California is a census-designated place in Ventura, County California.

Oak Park, California may also refer to the following places:

- Oak Park, Sacramento, California, a neighborhood in Sacramento southeast of Downtown
- Oak Park, San Diego, a neighborhood in Southeast San Diego
