= Via de la Valle, San Diego =

- Community of San Diego
- Via de la Valle
- Location within San Diego County
- Coordinates: 32°58′52.2″N 117°14′41.3″W
- Country: United States of America
- State: California
- County: San Diego
- City: San Diego

Via de la Valle is a small residential neighborhood in northern San Diego, California. The neighborhood is bordered by the City of Solana Beach to the north and west, the unincorporated San Diego County community of Rancho Santa Fe to the east, and undeveloped natural areas of North City, San Diego, to the south. Due to its zip code, properties in the neighborhood typically use a Del Mar, California address despite being within San Diego city limits. Approximately 125 acres (51 hectares) in size, Via de la Valle is the smallest community planning area in the City of San Diego.

== See also ==
- List of neighborhoods of San Diego, California
