= Midway, San Diego =

Community in San Diego, California

Coordinates: 32°44′28.94″N 117°12′54.7″W

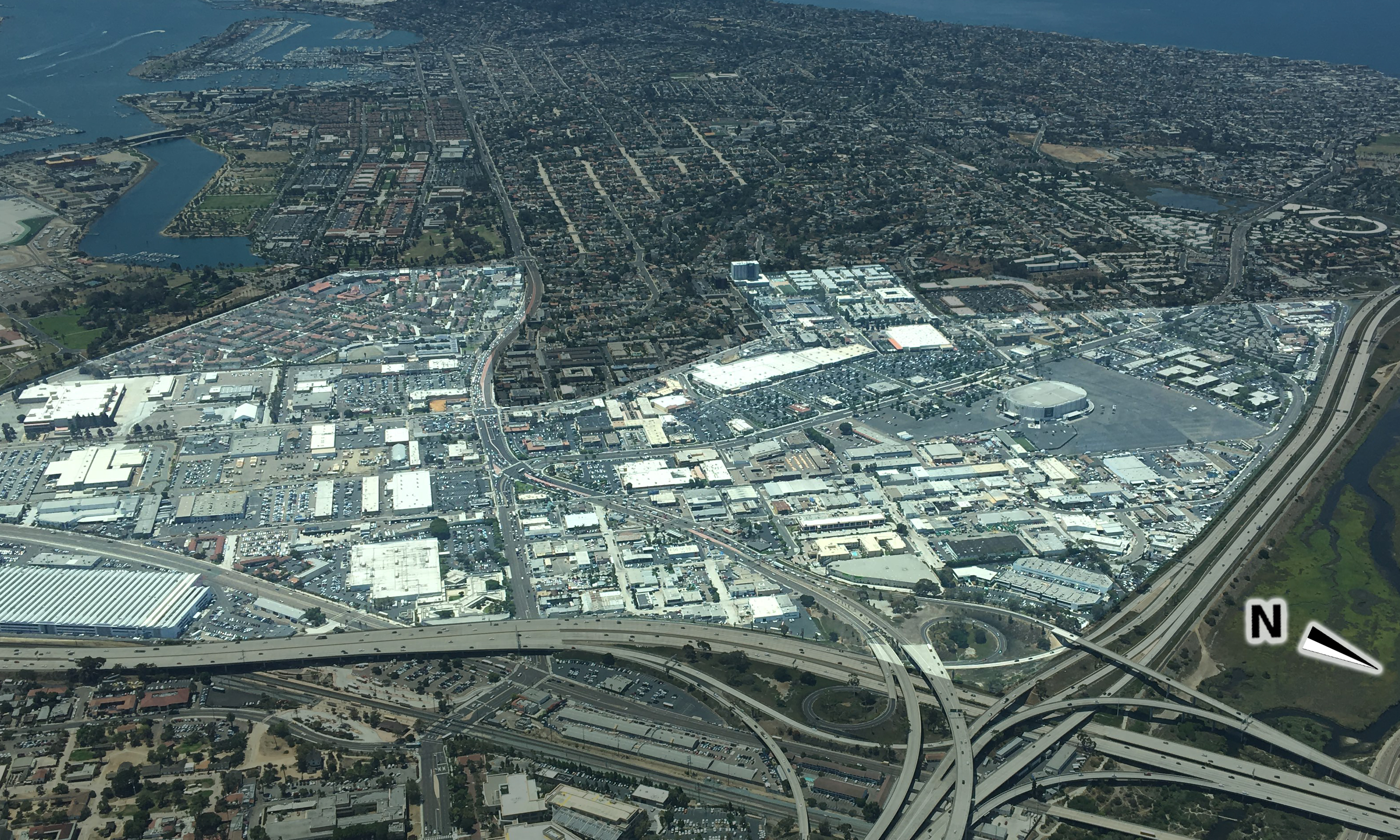
Aerial image of Midway, looking northwest. Dimmed areas include Old Town, Loma Portal, Liberty Station, Point Loma, and the San Diego River.

Midway (also known as the Midway District) is a neighborhood in San Diego, California. It is located at the northern (mainland) end of the Point Loma peninsula, northwest of downtown San Diego, and just west of Old Town. It is often considered to be part of Point Loma, although the city treats it as a separate planning area.

The boundaries of the Midway community plan are the San Diego River and Interstate 8 to the north, Interstate 5 to the east, Laurel Street to the south, and Lytton Street and the bluffs above Kenyon Street to the west. In addition to the core Midway area, the community plan includes portions of the historic neighborhoods of Five Points and Middletown. The planning area encompasses approximately 800 acres (320 ha) of mostly flat land. The area is primarily commercial and industrial, plus a few small pockets of multifamily residential development.

== History ==
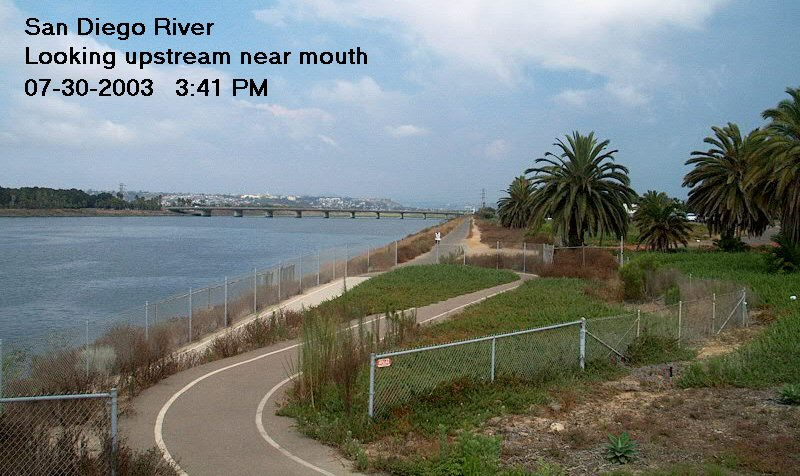
The San Diego River marks the northern boundary of the Midway area

Historically the area was part of the San Diego River delta, comprising the flat land between the hill of the San Diego Presidio and the hills of Point Loma. The San Diego River switched back and forth between emptying into Mission Bay (called False Bay by the early settlers) and emptying through the Midway area into San Diego Bay. Sometime during the 1820s, the river switched its course from False Bay to San Diego Bay. Because of fears that San Diego Bay might silt up, the river was confined to its present course north of Point Loma by a levee built by the city in 1877. This exposed the flat, marshy areas of Midway for development.

Rosecrans Street, a main thoroughfare through Midway and Point Loma, follows the route of the historic La Playa Trail, the oldest European trail in the Western United States. It connected the settlements in Old Town and Mission San Diego with La Playa, the beach in Point Loma where ships loaded and unloaded cargo. A plaque near the southeast corner of Rosecrans Street and Midway Drive recognizes the historic importance of the La Playa Trail.

In 1850, approximately 687 acres (278 ha) of land in the area was conveyed to a group of ten would-be developers, who subdivided the land in hopes of developing it. The names of some of the original ten investors are remembered in the existing street name system along Pacific Highway, including Emory, Sutherland, Noell, Estudillo, Wright, Banini, Couts, and Witherby. However, the area was still marshy, and little development occurred until the 1930s, when commercial, industrial, and residential development could be found in some areas.

By the early 1900s, central Midway was known as Dutch Flats and still included a lot of standing water. Dutch Flats was also the name of what was originally a small dirt airstrip in the area used by the Ryan Aeronautical Company, located near what are now Midway and Barnett streets. The company built a factory and established a flight school at the location. Dutch Flats Airport became famous when Ryan built a specially designed aircraft for Charles A. Lindbergh, who tested it at Dutch Flats and then used it to fly solo across the Atlantic in 1927. In 1929, pioneer aviator Ruth Alexander, a graduate of the Ryan Flying School, established a new world record for women in light aircraft on a flight from Dutch Flats. A post office now located on the site contains several historic plaques commemorating Dutch Flats and Lindbergh.

In 1921, the Marine Advanced Expeditionary Base (now Marine Corps Recruit Depot San Diego) was built in the Midway area on Barnett Avenue, lending a boost to the area's economy and setting the stage for future military development. The city of San Diego opened San Diego Municipal Airport/Lindbergh Field in 1928 on land located between the Midway area and San Diego Bay. As a result, aircraft-related industries and businesses continued to be important for the Midway area up until the present day.

During the 1940s, the Midway area experienced a boom, with numerous war-related industrial sites and thousands of people arriving from all over the country to work at them. At first, they had no place to live except ramshackle camps and tent cities. The Federal government then built a large (approximately 4000 units) housing complex for defense workers, known as the Frontier Housing. Areas along Pacific Highway became wartime factories, and later provided the hub of the city's aerospace industry.

Throughout the 1950s, the neighborhood became a mecca for then-popular establishments such as a drive-in restaurant (Oscar's, owned by Robert Oscar Peterson who later founded the Jack in the Box chain), two drive-in theaters (the Midway and the Frontier), and a bowling alley (Frontier Lanes). The only remaining structure from that era is the Loma Theater on Rosecrans St., which opened in 1944 as a 1188-seat movie palace in the Arte Moderne style; it is now a bookstore with some of the Arte Moderne architectural features retained, including the neon sign. From the 1960s to the present the area became less industrial and more commercial. It is now mainly known for large region-serving retail establishments and multi-lane traffic arteries.

The Frontier development housed 20,000 people and had three schools, a recreation center, and a library. It was unusual in the Point Loma area because of the diversity of its residents, which made existing homeowners uncomfortable; they lobbied the city to replace the development with something else. During the 1960s the entire housing project was demolished and replaced with the Sports Arena and large retail and commercial areas.

The Mission Brewery building on Pacific Highway, built in 1912, is now on the National Register of Historic Places

During the 1990s the city proposed to build a “bay to bay” water link between San Diego Bay and Mission Bay, which would have run right through the Midway area. However, the plan received little community support and was abandoned after a consultant's report deemed it not economically feasible.

The area contains two sites that are listed on the National Register of Historic Places: Mission Brewery, a five-story brick building on Hancock Street dating from 1912, originally a brewery but now used for offices and retail; and the Marine Corps Recruit Depot Historic District. Additional sites listed as historic by the San Diego Historical Resources Board include the site of a Hebrew cemetery (now a residential building) on Kenyon Street and Dutch Flats/Ryan Field.

== Geography ==
The area is entirely flat. It consists mostly of “fill” land built up over formerly marshy areas and river sediment deposits. Nothing remains of the former wetlands except Famosa Slough State Marine Conservation Area (a city-owned nature preserve which is technically located in Point Loma but is considered part of Midway by many people) and the San Diego River bed itself.

Most of the area is commercial or industrial in nature, but there are some residential areas, including the seniors-only Orchard Apartments (built on land owned by the city of San Diego), a Navy family housing complex between Rosecrans and Barnett, and some private apartment and condominium developments in the Pacific Highway corridor near the San Diego Trolley.

== Economy ==
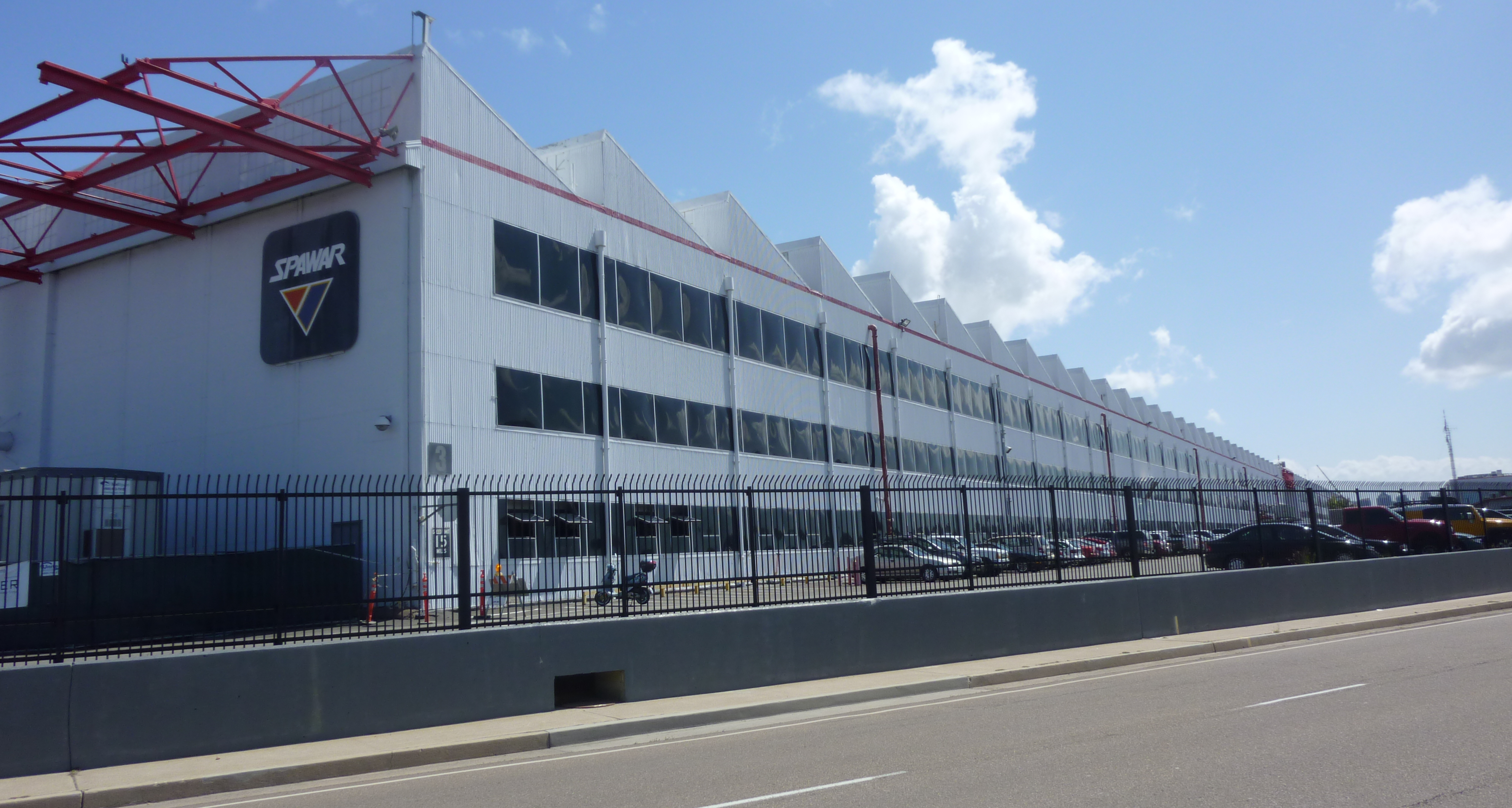
Naval Information Warfare Systems Command Program Executive Offices (NAVWAR)

The area now consists primarily of medium-to-large strip malls with region-serving stores such as groceries, drugstores, and general and discount stores. There are a few remaining small industrial businesses such as boat repair yards and trucking firms. There are also many airport-related businesses such as long-term parking lots and car rental companies.

A major employer in the area is the Space and Naval Warfare Systems Command, known as “SPAWAR". SPAWAR is a major Navy Acquisition Command, as well as the parent organization to the Space and Naval Warfare Systems Center - Pacific, a research laboratory in Point Loma. In February 2019 the name of the facility was changed to Naval Information Warfare Center Pacific. The Navy has indicated it would like to move its facilities elsewhere and lease the site out for redevelopment, possibly as a regional transportation center.

Midway is also known for a concentration of adult establishments such as strip clubs, partly because city laws regulating such establishments make the area favorable for them, and partly because of the proximity of large military bases (MCRD and formerly Naval Training Center San Diego) full of young recruits. Homeless people are exceptionally visible in the area, partly because of illegal but tolerated encampments along the San Diego River, and partially due to the presence of numerous establishments such as Goodwill, the Salvation Army, and the San Diego Veterans Village.

Midway was included in the North Bay Redevelopment Project area until it and all other redevelopment agencies were dissolved by the state of California in 2012.

== Culture ==
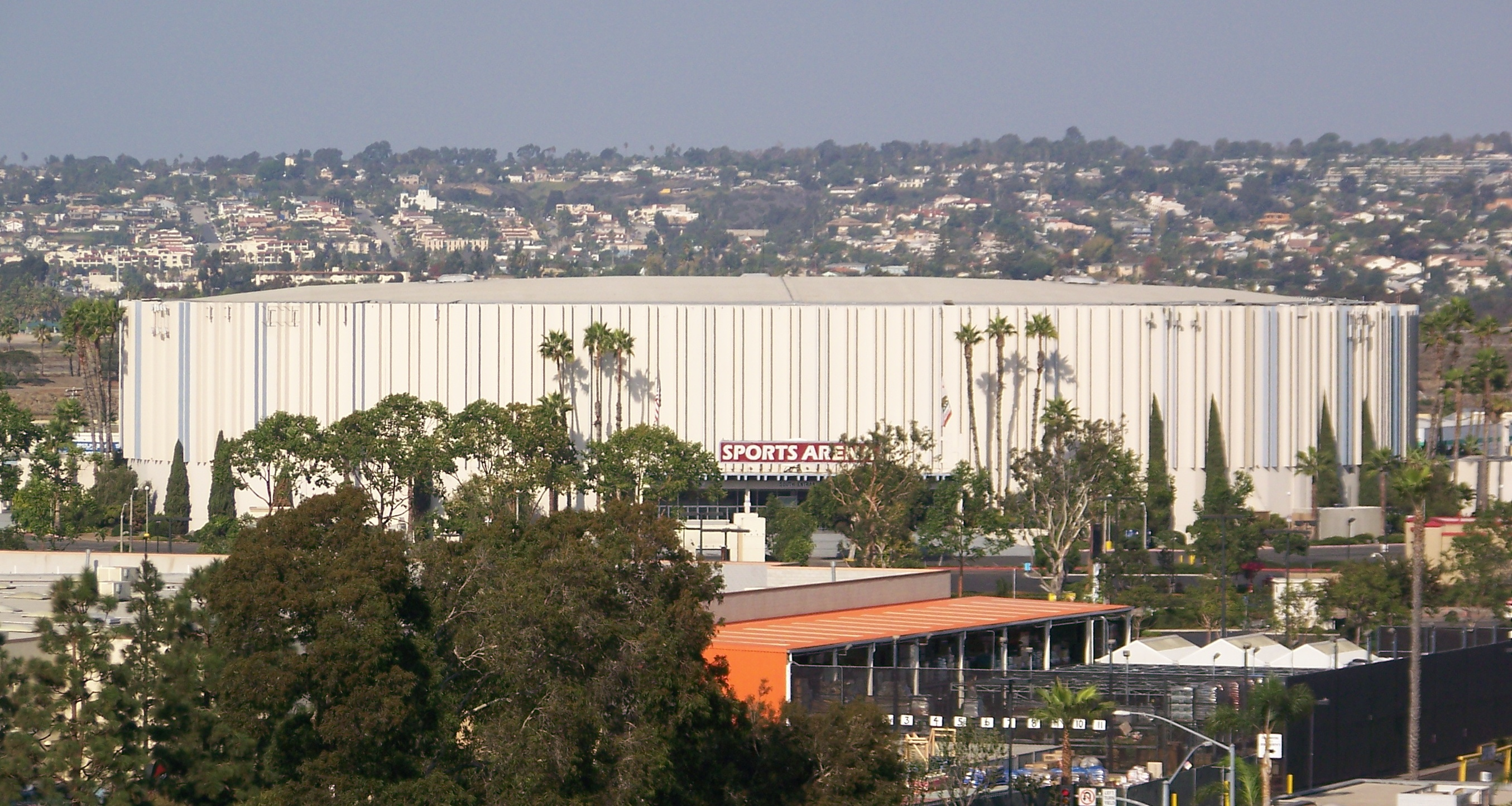
Pechanga Arena, then-named San Diego Sports Arena in November 2007

Pechanga Arena is owned by the city and managed by a private company. It is the home of the San Diego Gulls of the American Hockey League (AHL) and the San Diego Seals of the National Lacrosse League (NLL).

Opened in 1966, the arena has been home to numerous athletic teams in several different sports. Of the major professional leagues, the arena hosted the National Basketball Association (NBA)'s San Diego Rockets from 1967 to 1971 and San Diego Clippers from 1978 to 1984.

It also hosts concerts and touring shows such as ice shows and circuses. One of the largest swap meets on the West Coast takes place in the parking lot each week. The SOMA concert venue is also located in Midway.

== Education ==
There is one public elementary school in the area, Dewey Elementary, under the jurisdiction of San Diego Unified School District, as well as a Catholic elementary-middle school, St. Charles Boromeo Academy. There is also an adult-education campus of San Diego Community College District on Fordham St.

== Infrastructure ==
The community is located next to the intersection of Interstate 5 and Interstate 8. It is dominated by multi-lane roads which serve as the main ingress and egress for the entire Point Loma peninsula. Rosecrans Street, Midway Drive, Sports Arena Boulevard (formerly known as Frontier Drive), West Point Loma Boulevard and Pacific Highway are the main streets. Traffic is extremely heavy and congestion is common. Two intersections in the Midway area (Midway/Rosecrans and Sports Arena/Rosecrans) are among the worst intersections in the city for accidents, according to the city of San Diego.

== Government ==
The area is part of the Second Council District in the City of San Diego, currently represented by Jennifer Campbell. The Midway Community Planning Group advises the city on planning, land use, and other issues.
