= Del Mar Mesa, San Diego =

- Community of San Diego
- Del Mar Mesa
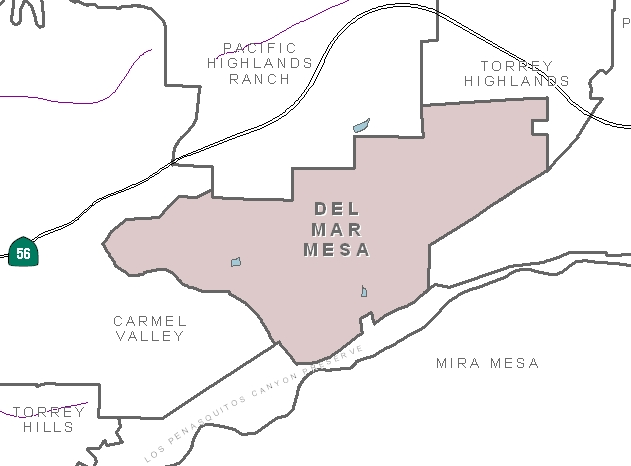
- Del Mar Mesa boundaries and surrounding communities

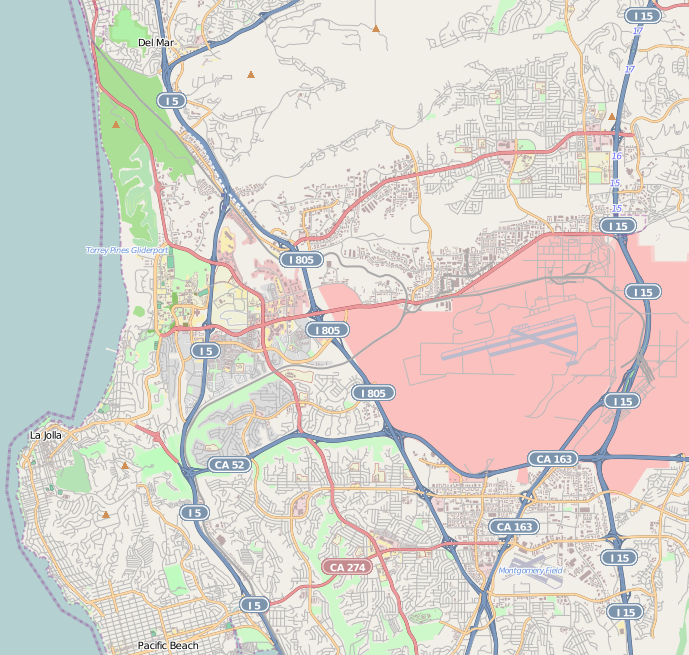
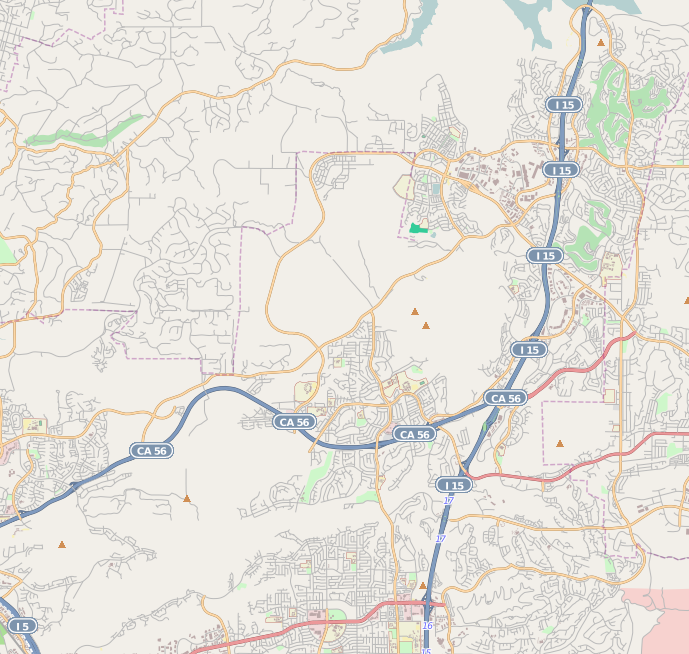
- Location within Northwestern San Diego Location within Northeastern San Diego
- Coordinates: 32°56′12″N 117°11′2″W
- Country: United States
- State: California
- County: San Diego
- City: San Diego

Del Mar Mesa is a semi-rural residential community of 2,042 acres (8.26 km^{2}) in northern San Diego, California. The majority of the community was developed in the 2000s. Over 900 acres is preserved open space protected habitat. The community also has 10 miles of hiking, biking and riding trails. Minimum lot size is half acre. Del Mar Mesa is a part of District 1 which is represented by Councilmember Joe LaCava on the San Diego City Council.

A number of artifacts, including pottery, possibly dating back 9,000 to 10,000 years ago, were found in this community and are being studied by the San Diego Archaeological Center.

== Geography ==
Del Mar Mesa is bordered to the north by Carmel Valley and Pacific Highlands Ranch, to the south by Los Peñasquitos Canyon, to the east by Torrey Highlands and Rancho Peñasquitos, and to the west by Torrey Hills. State Route 56 (Ted Williams Freeway) is slightly north of this community. The Del Mar Mesa community consists of 2,042 acres.

In the eastern part of the community, a large portion of land is conserved for open space under the city's Multiple Species Conservation Program. Eucalyptus groves in the community were planted around farmsteads in the 1800s.

== Demographics ==
According to January 2006 estimates by the San Diego Association of Governments, there were 525 people and 227 households residing in the neighborhood, which increased 1,246.2% from 39 people in 2000. The estimated racial makeup was 68.7% White, 15.2% Asian & Pacific Islander, 12.0% Hispanic, 4.0% from other races, 0.8% American Indian, and 0.2% African American. The median age is 37.8 with 29.1% under the age of 18 and 9.3% over the age of 65. The estimated median household income was $139,630 ($109,375 adjusted for inflation in 1999 dollars); 18.9% of the community made more than $150,000; 47.6% made between $60,000 and $149,999; and 18.9% made less than $60,000.
