= Torrey Highlands, San Diego =

- Community of San Diego
- Torrey Highlands
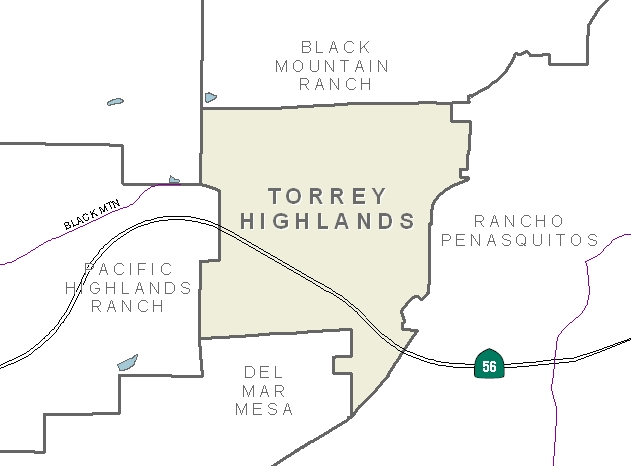
- Torrey Highlands and neighborhood boundaries

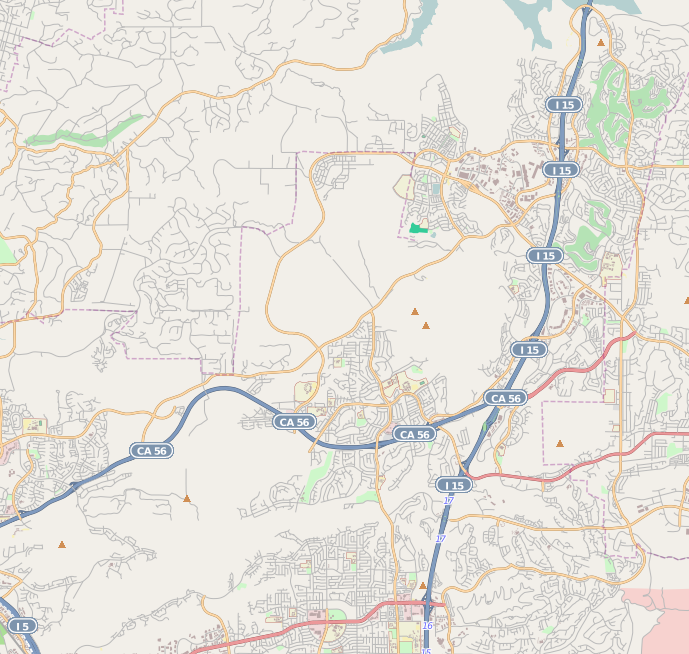
- Location within Northeastern San Diego Torrey Highlands, San Diego (San Diego County, California)
- Coordinates: 32°58′06.28″N 117°09′31.78″W
- Country: United States of America
- State: California
- County: San Diego
- City: San Diego

Torrey Highlands is a primarily residential community in northern San Diego, California, United States. Most of the community has been developed from 2000 to present.

== History ==
Before Torrey Highlands became a residential community, the area was largely used for agricultural purposes.

Around 1994, the area received an influx of displaced migrant villagers from the Rancho de los Diablos encampment in Pacific Highlands Ranch, who lived off of the land while working on the farms in the area. The community of Rancho Diablo lived in between the canyons before being evicted from Torrey Highlands in the 2010s.

In 1996, the Torrey Highlands Subarea Plan was approved by the City Council and by the voters of the City of San Diego, graduating from the North City Future Urbanizing Area plan.

Torrey Highlands was mostly built in the 2000s as a largely residential community, with State Route 56 cutting through it.

== Geography ==
Torrey Highlands is bordered to the north by Black Mountain Ranch; to the south by Del Mar Mesa; to the east by Rancho Peñasquitos; to the west by Pacific Highlands Ranch; and to the northwest by Fairbanks Ranch.

The Torrey Highlands Subarea Plan was approved in 1996 by voters and the City Council. The Torrey Highlands Subarea Plan limited dwelling units to no more than 2,600 and designated 50 percent of Torrey Highlands for residential development, 30 percent for parks and open space, 12 percent for schools, 5 percent for commercial, and 3 percent for employment centers.

== Demographics ==
According to January 2006 estimates by the San Diego Association of Governments, there were 2,401 people and 227 households residing in the neighborhood, which increased 29,912.5% from 8 people and 2 households in 2000. The estimated racial makeup was 58.6% White, 30.5% Asian & Pacific Islander, 5.5% Hispanic, 4.0% from other races, 1.3% African American, and 0.2% American Indian. The median age was 39.9 with 28.2% under the age of 18 and 8.5% over the age of 65. The estimated median household income was $130,086 ($101,899 adjusted for inflation in 1999 dollars); 20.7% of the community made more than $150,000; 63.0% made between $60,000 and $149,999; and 16.3% made less than $60,000.

== Education ==
Torrey Highlands is served by the Poway Unified School District, including Westview High School, which is located in the neighborhood.
