= Harborview, San Diego =

Neighborhood in San Diego, California, US

Coordinates: 32°43′37″N 117°10′17″W

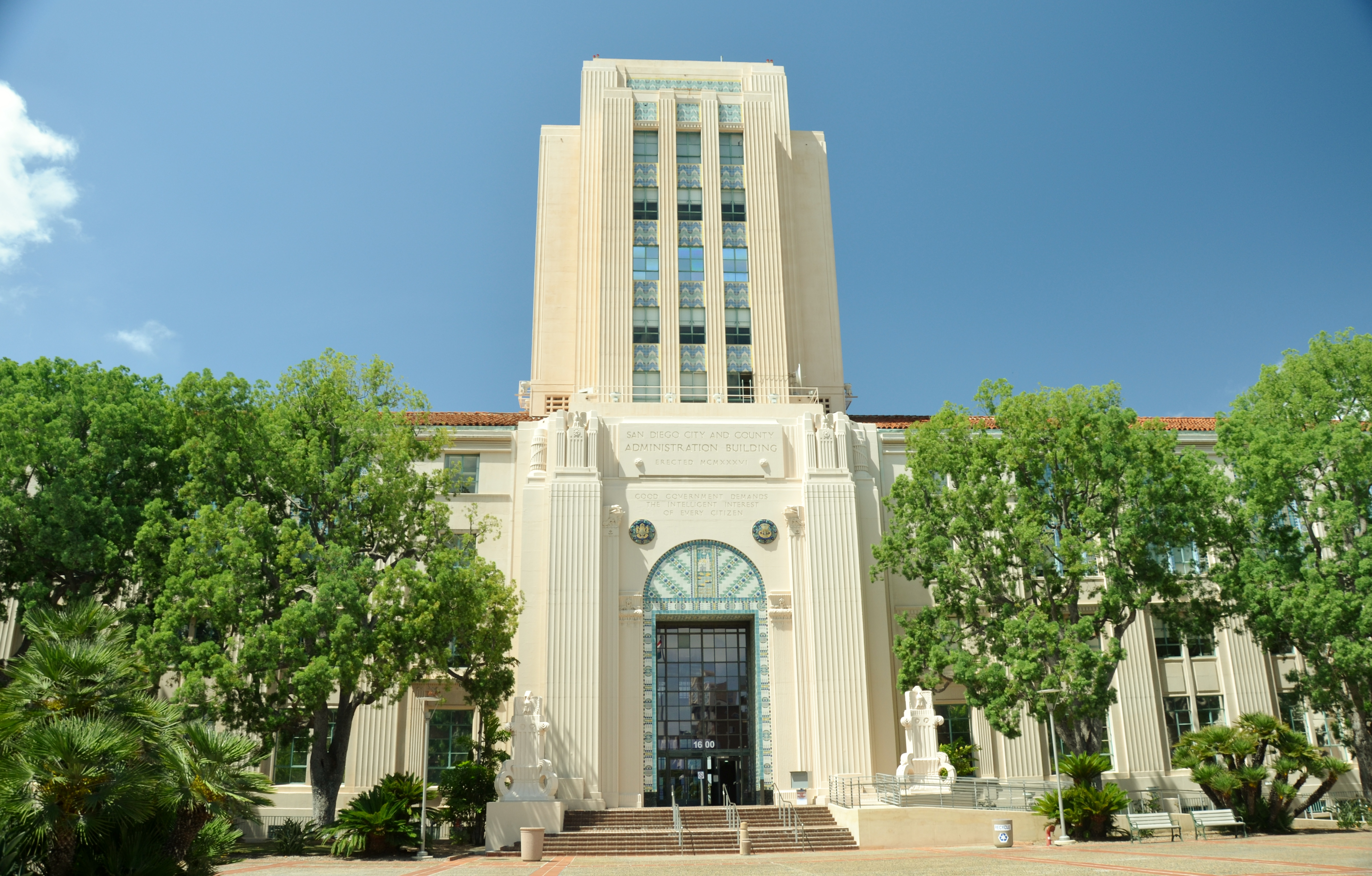
Harborview, San Diego, CA 92101, US

Harborview is a neighborhood in downtown San Diego, California, United States. It is bordered by Midway to the north, Little Italy to the east, San Diego Bay to the west, and Columbia to the south.
