= Fairmount Park, San Diego =

Coordinates: 32°43′23.3″N 117°6′33.25″W

Fairmount Park is a neighborhood of San Diego, California. Its borders are defined by Interstate 15 to the west, Interstate 805 to the east and California Highway 94 to the south. Its neighboring communities are South Park and Golden Hill to the west, Azalea Park and City Heights to the east, and Webster to the south. It is primarily residential, mostly single-family homes, with a small commercial area along Home Avenue including several restaurants and convenience stores. Bayridge is a small neighborhood within Fairmount Park on its westernmost knoll, identifiable by its outstanding views and well-maintained townhouse development. Fairmount Park is 3 miles from downtown San Diego. Chollas Creek runs through it.

It is part of the City Heights community plan area and is located in city council district 9, represented by Sean Elo-Rivera.
