= Islenair, San Diego =

Coordinates: 32°44′27.42″N 117°5′29.31″W

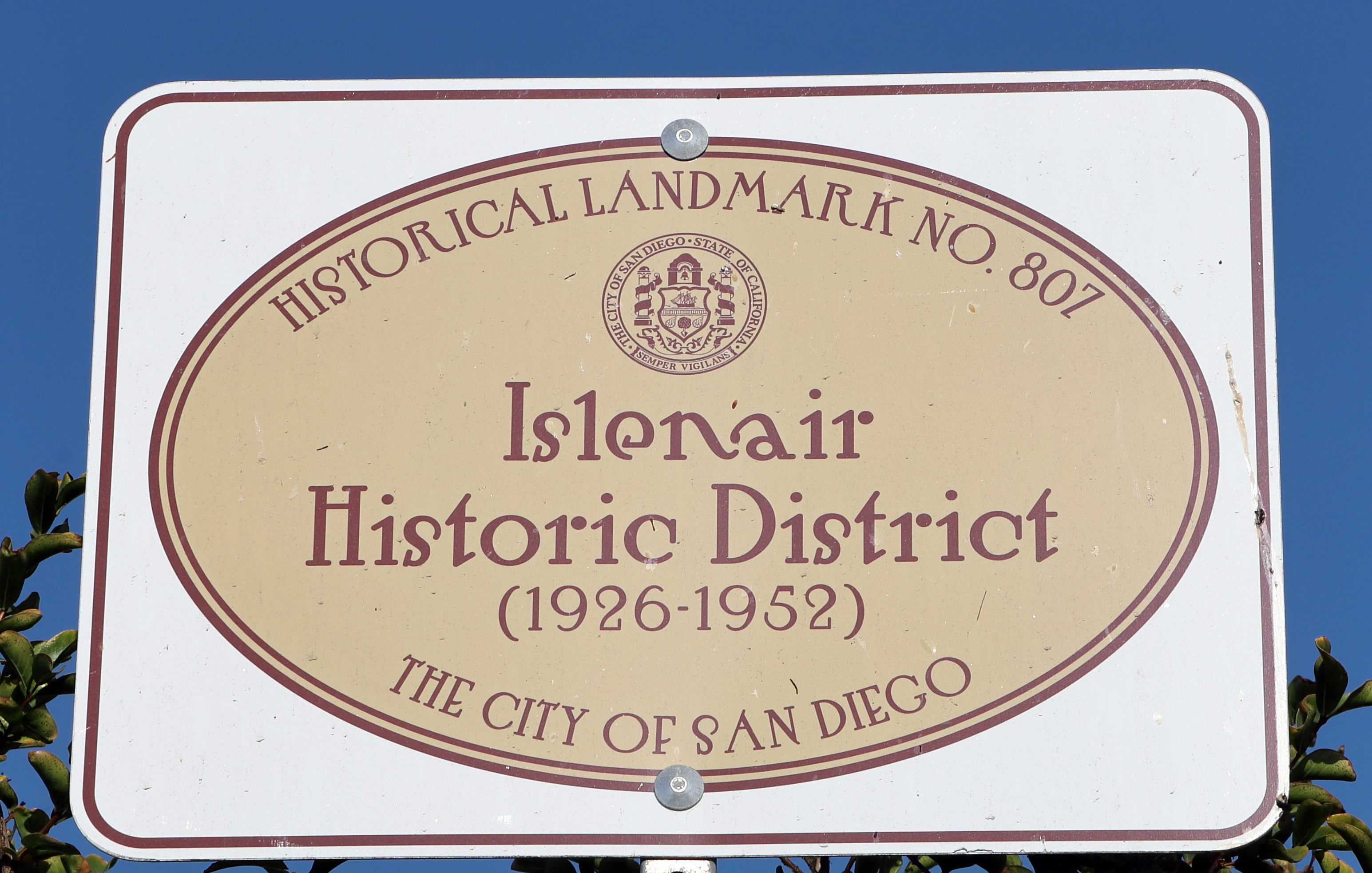
City of San Diego historical landmark no. 807

Islenair is a neighborhood and city-designated historic district in San Diego, California, often considered part of the larger City Heights neighborhood. The historic district is located along Euclid Ave., Belle Isle Dr., Isla Vista Dr., and Thorn St.

"Islenair is a small, working class, early auto-oriented suburb that reflects the small house movement which took hold following World War I and became a national standard of development in the wake of the Great Depression and the post–World War II housing shortage."
