= Black Mountain Ranch, San Diego =

- Community of San Diego
- Black Mountain Ranch
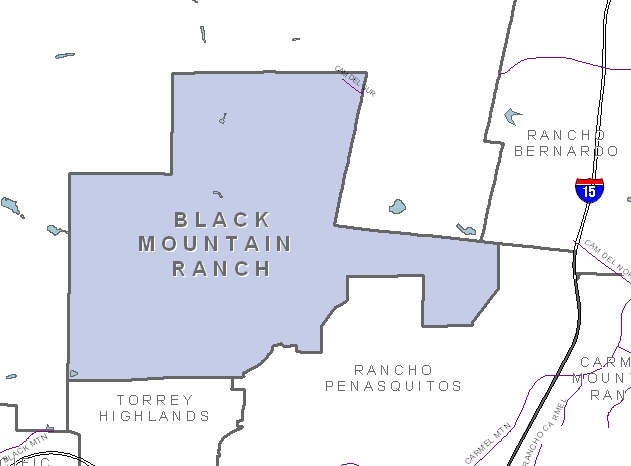
- Black Mountain Ranch and neighborhood boundaries

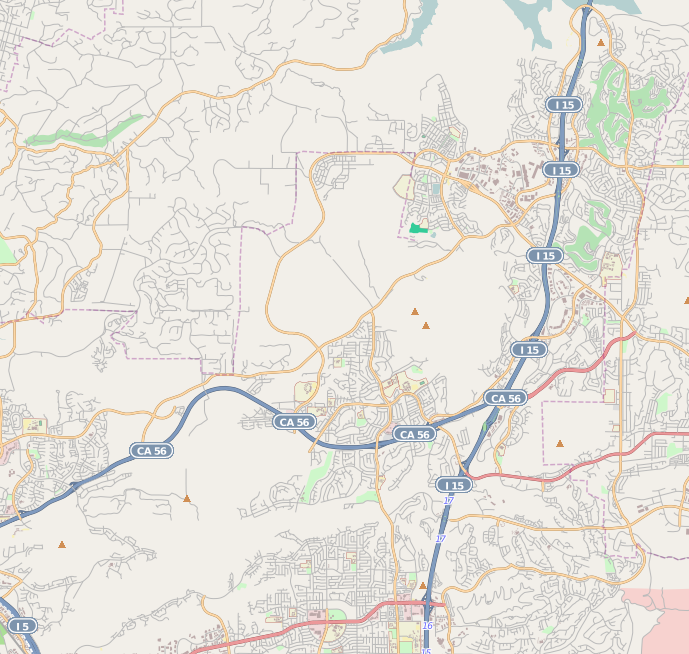
- Location within Northeastern San Diego Black Mountain Ranch, San Diego (San Diego County, California)
- Coordinates: 33°00′07″N 117°07′55″W
- Country: United States of America
- State: California
- County: San Diego
- City: San Diego

Black Mountain Ranch is a suburban community in the northern part of San Diego, California. Black Mountain Ranch encompasses 5,100 acres (21 km^{2}) and is located north of Rancho Peñasquitos and Torrey Highlands, south of the Santa Fe Valley, east of Fairbanks Ranch and Rancho Santa Fe, and west of 4S Ranch.

The development of Black Mountain Ranch took over 17 years to complete and was led by Fred Maas, a local San Diego businessman with a background in politics and sustainable building practices.

Black Mountain Ranch primarily consists of two separate housing developments known as Santaluz and Del Sur. Santaluz is the area in the southern half of Black Mountain Ranch while Del Sur comprises the northern half.

Primary access to the community is via Camino Del Sur (from State Highway 56 via Interstate 5 or 15), Carmel Valley Road, San Dieguito Road (from Rancho Santa Fe) and Camino Del Norte (from Interstate 15).

There is a city park, South Village Neighborhood Park, near Willow Grove Elementary School at 14756 Via Azul, San Diego, CA 92127, located just a block off Camino del Sur. There is also the Black Mountain Open Space Park off Carmel Valley Road at Black Mountain Road, east of Camino del Sur.

The area is served by Poway Unified School District (PUSD) and includes Del Sur Elementary School (opened 2008), Willow Grove Elementary and Del Norte High School (opened 2009).

The nearest shopping areas are 4S Ranch to the north, Carmel Mountain Ranch to the east, Torrey Highlands to the south, and Pacific Highlands Ranch to the west. Del Sur Town Center opened in October 2015.

The area is part of San Diego City Council District 5, served by Marni von Wilpert. It falls under the Rancho Penasquitos Planning Board, and holds two seats on the board.

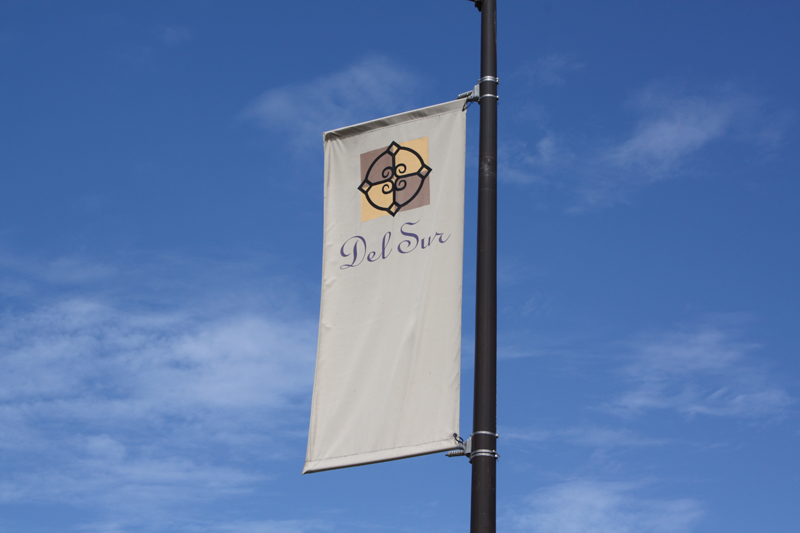
Welcome to Del Sur

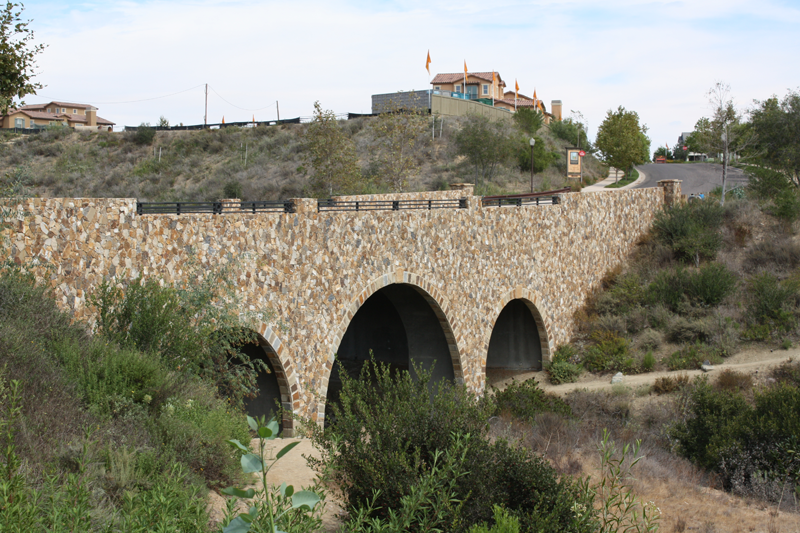
Del Sur Bridge

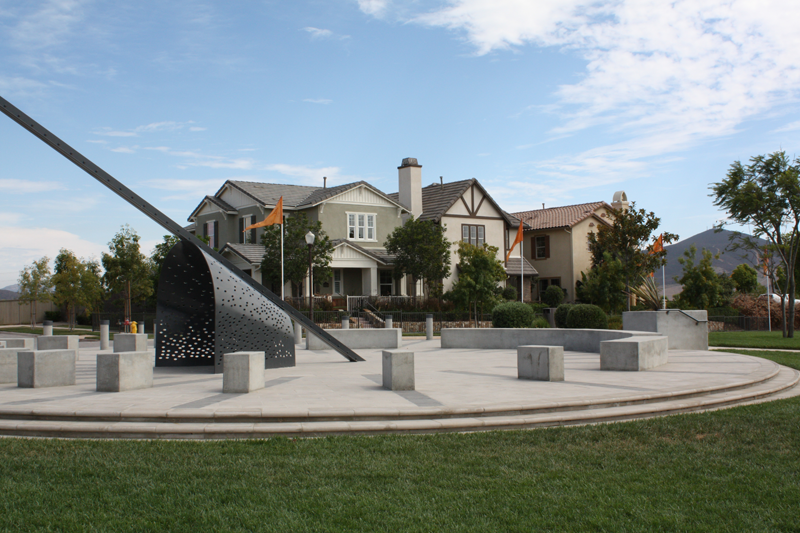
Del Sur Community

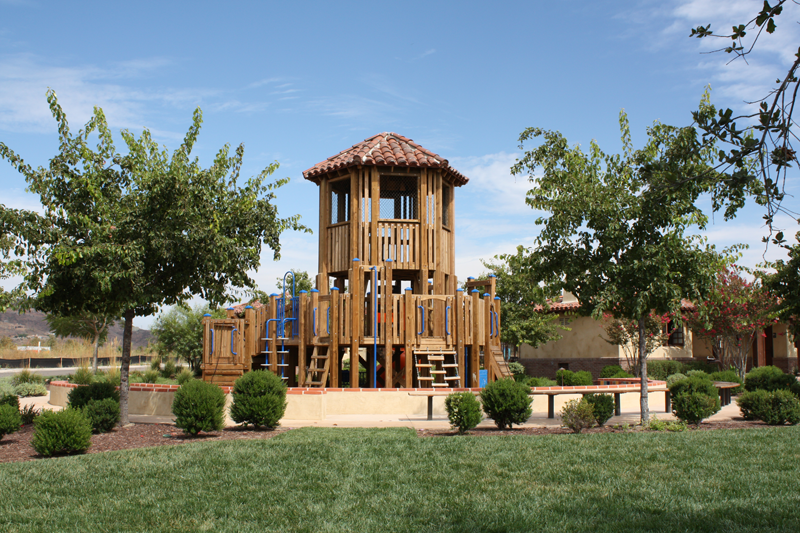
A park in Del Sur

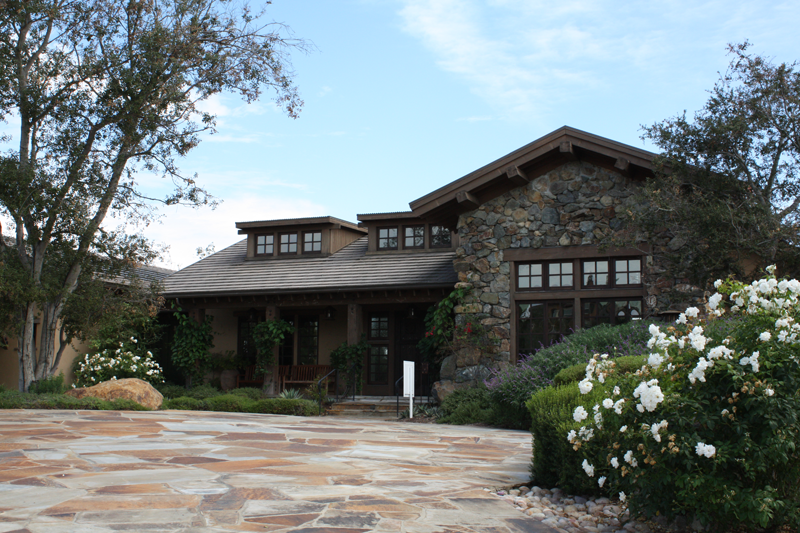
The Ranch House in Del Sur
