= Azalea Park, San Diego =

Community in San Diego, California, United States

Coordinates: 32°44′2.16″N 117°6′19.66″W

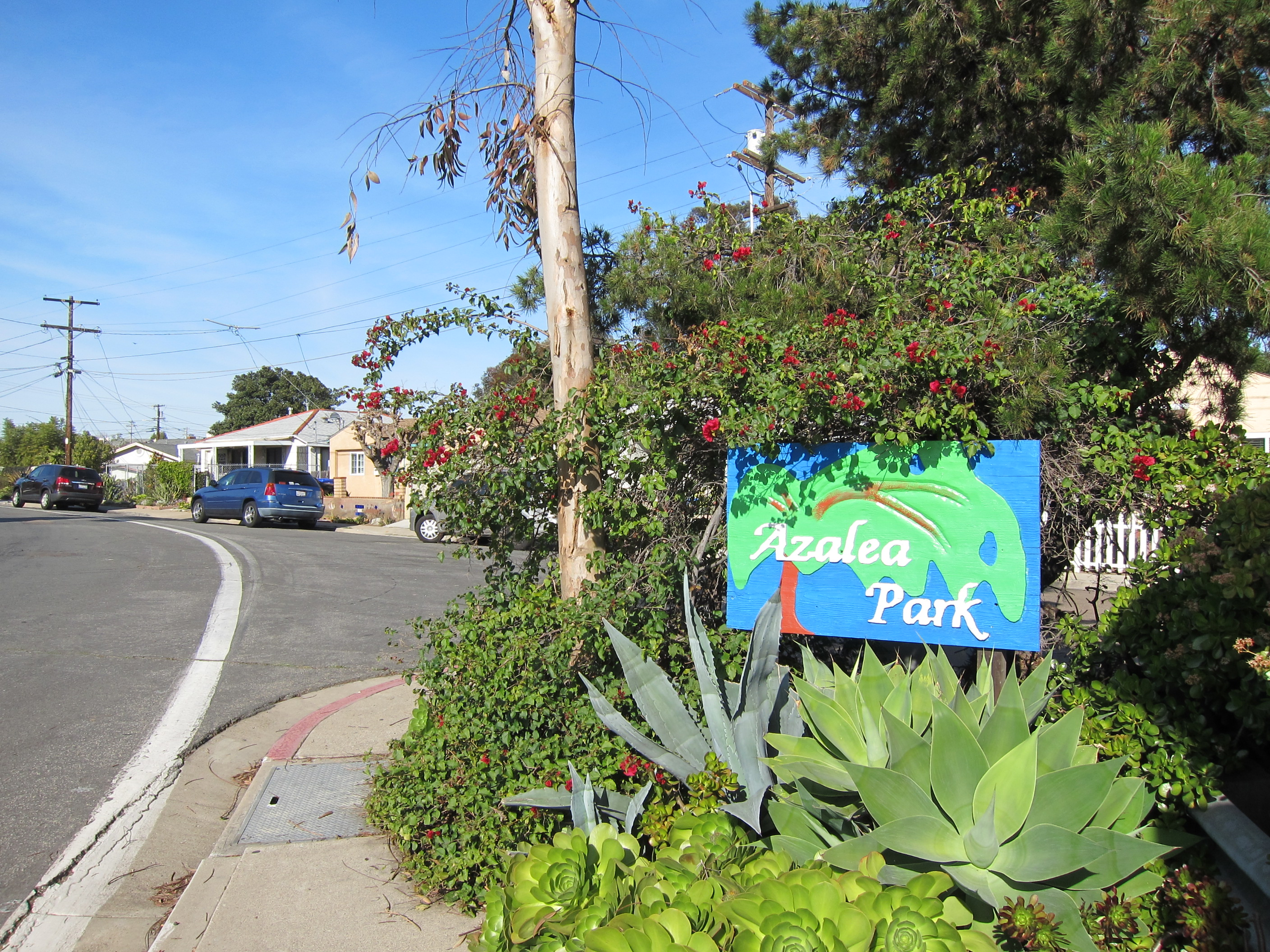
Entrance to Azalea Park

Azalea Park is a community in City Heights in the greater San Diego, California, area. It is located on top of a plateau 3 miles east of San Diego Bay, with an elevation of around 300 feet. It is bordered to the north by Manzanita Canyon (Lexington Street, officially a paper street at the bottom of the canyon) Fairmount Avenue to the east, Interstate 805 to the west, and Hollywood Park to the south.

"In 1994, resident activist Linda Pennington sat on her porch after a Saturday of painting over graffiti with her husband and a few neighbors and remarked how great it would be if members of the San Diego gay community would move in. She had observed that Hillcrest, a neighborhood in San Diego popular with homosexual couples, seemed to suddenly prosper and thrive. That was the start of an effort to target market a group of potential homeowners that has been 'wildly successful,' said Pennington, whose efforts sent her and other residents to Gay Pride marches to set up booths and actively recruit homosexuals to move to Azalea Park. They made a match between having not-so-great schools but a good housing stock and the thought that if they offered an environment that was welcoming to this particular population — households with no children and reasonably high incomes — it could have a revitalizing effect on the neighborhood."

The target marketing worked. Since 1994, the gay population of Azalea Park has increased dramatically, occupying 100 of the 800 housing units. To spread the message of Azalea Park, Pennington and a dozen other residents marched in the city's annual Lesbian & Gay Pride Parade in Hillcrest under the banner "Azalea Park. An Affordable Canyon Neighborhood."

Azalea Park is blossoming into the Azalea Park Arts District (APAD). Visitors can find sculptures, art installations, murals and hand-painted signs to denote the flower-named streets. The Manzanita Gathering Place was built to be a creative refuge awash in art at the opening at Manzanita Canyon, with canopies and columns incorporating mosaic tiles made by Azalea Park residents. Local artists have moved their businesses to Azalea Park and see this neighborhood becoming a vibrant arts community. At the Azalea Community Park, local artists have created a unique oasis with the Water Conservation Garden, a collection of succulent plants and creative sculpture.
