= Gateway, San Diego =

Coordinates: 32°43′28″N 117°06′38″W

Gateway is a neighborhood of the Mid-City region of San Diego, California.

== Geography ==
Gateway's borders are defined by State Route 15 to the West, Interstate 805 to the Northeast, Home Avenue to the Southeast, and State Route 94 to the South.

== Education ==
- Rowan Elementary School (San Diego Unified School District)
