= Civita, San Diego =

Community in San Diego, California

Coordinates: 32°46′42″N 117°8′45″W

Civita is a master-planned community in the Mission Valley area of San Diego, California, United States. Located on a former quarry site, the urban-style, sustainable, transit-oriented 230-acre (93 ha) village is organized around a 14.3-acre (5.8 ha) community park that cascades down the terraced property.

Civita development plans call for 60 to 70 acres (24 to 28 ha) of parks and open space, 4,780 residences (including approximately 478 affordable units), an approximately 480,000-square-foot (45,000 m^{2}) retail center, and 420,000 square feet (39,000 m^{2}) for an office/business campus.

The Civita project is budgeted at $2 billion and being developed by Sudberry Properties, in partnership with the Grant family, which has operated the former quarry since 1937.

== Location ==
Civita is located just north of Friars Road between SR 163 and I-805 in San Diego’s Mission Valley, which was the site of the first Spanish settlement in California, established in 1769. Mission Valley is named for Mission San Diego de Alcalá, the first California Mission.

Civita is located about 7 miles (11 km) from downtown San Diego and San Diego International Airport.

=== Geography ===
The Civita property is located in a former quarry north of the San Diego River. The property slopes down toward the river. The Civita plan calls for development on a series of terraces. Each terrace contains housing and a level footpath leading to a central park.-

== History ==
During the first half of the twentieth century, Mission Valley was a largely undeveloped expanse of dairy farms and agricultural operations. In the early 1900s, Franklin and Alta Grant purchased land along the San Diego River, hoping to find oil. Instead, they discovered rock and the family mined the quarry for about 70 years. The Grants' grandchildren decided to turn the family property into a walkable village. They partnered with Sudberry Properties, a longtime San Diego developer.

After nine years of planning, a plan to develop the Quarry Falls community (now called Civita) was approved by the San Diego City Council by a vote of 7-1. More than 130 people attended the meeting. Supporters, including representatives from environmental and smart-growth groups, outnumbered opponents 4-to-1.

In 2010, the developers broke ground on Civita and the first homes were occupied in 2011.

== Land planning ==
The 230-acre (93 ha) Civita project is one of the largest examples of “urban infill,” which is the development of vacant or underused city sites, in the U.S.

The $2 billion project embraces San Diego’s “City of Villages” concept – compact, pedestrian-friendly neighborhoods that are located within walking distance of public transit and other needs.

The Civita master plan was designed by local architect and planner Gordon Carrier, a principal at Carrier Johnson + Culture. Carrier’s plan will ultimately create a high-density urban village organized around a network of parks and open space, with housing, retail, office, and civic components linked by pedestrian trails, walkable streets, and bike paths.

Carrier commented that the goal of the Civita design is to create a “real” neighborhood that “combines topography, walkability and the ability to live, work and play in the same place…[T]he design makes it convenient for residents to walk or ride bicycles rather than use cars, by locating shopping, parks and recreation facilities within walking distance of their homes.”

“Civita serves as a perfect model for the future growth of the region,” said Brian Schoenfisch, a senior planner for the city of San Diego.

== Sustainability ==
=== Green building practices ===
Sudberry Properties, the developer of Civita, incorporated numerous green building practices in the Civita design. For example, more street trees have been planted than were required by the city of San Diego. Sudberry also specified low-energy LED lights for traffic signals and street lighting.

Sudberry’s Civita master plan also encourages people to walk by rearranging the sloping site in a series of terraces, each containing housing and level footpaths to and from the central park and stream, which are expected to experience heavy use.

In 2012, Sudberry Properties entered into an agreement with San Diego Gas & Electric to create a “Smart Energy Community” for Civita. The agreement specifies potential installation of new smart grid technologies that will make Civita more sustainable and energy efficient. The technologies include solar panels, electric vehicle charging stations, fuel cell generation, battery storage, and enhanced energy management tools for residents. They are expected to help residents and businesses conserve electricity, preserve the environment, and establish Civita as a model for future low-carbon communities.

=== Homes and commercial buildings ===
Energy-conservation and sustainability are high priority goals for Civita’s home and commercial building designs. Homebuilders are required specify Energy Star appliances and exceed California’s Title 24 energy requirements by 15 percent.

The first apartment neighborhood in Civita, Circa 37, exceeded the Title 24 requirements, achieving energy efficiency of almost 20 percent. For Circa 37, Sudberry Properties made extensive use of energy-efficient lighting, windows and HVAC systems, a 145 kW solar array that powers 80 percent of the common area electricity consumption, and “cool roofs” that minimize heat transfer.

Storm water runoff from residential areas in Civita and parts of Serra Mesa are primarily directed to a unique bioswale system in Civita’s central park. The bioswale, which has the appearance of a natural streambed, will remove silt and pollution from the runoff through natural biofiltration and reestablish plant and animal habitats.

=== Ride sharing ===
In 2013, Civita launched a ride-sharing program that featured a fleet of smart electric drive vehicles through car2go. Six public electric car charging stations were onsite, but that program is not in operation as of January 27, 2024.

=== Awards ===
In 2009, Civita achieved a Stage 1 Gold rating for the U.S. Green Building Council’s 2009 LEED-ND (Neighborhood Development) pilot and received the California Governor’s Environmental and Economic Leadership Award.

In 2010, Civita was designated as a California Catalyst Community by the California Department of Housing and Community Development to support innovation and test sustainable strategies that reflect the interdependence of environmental, economic, and community health.

== Civita Park ==
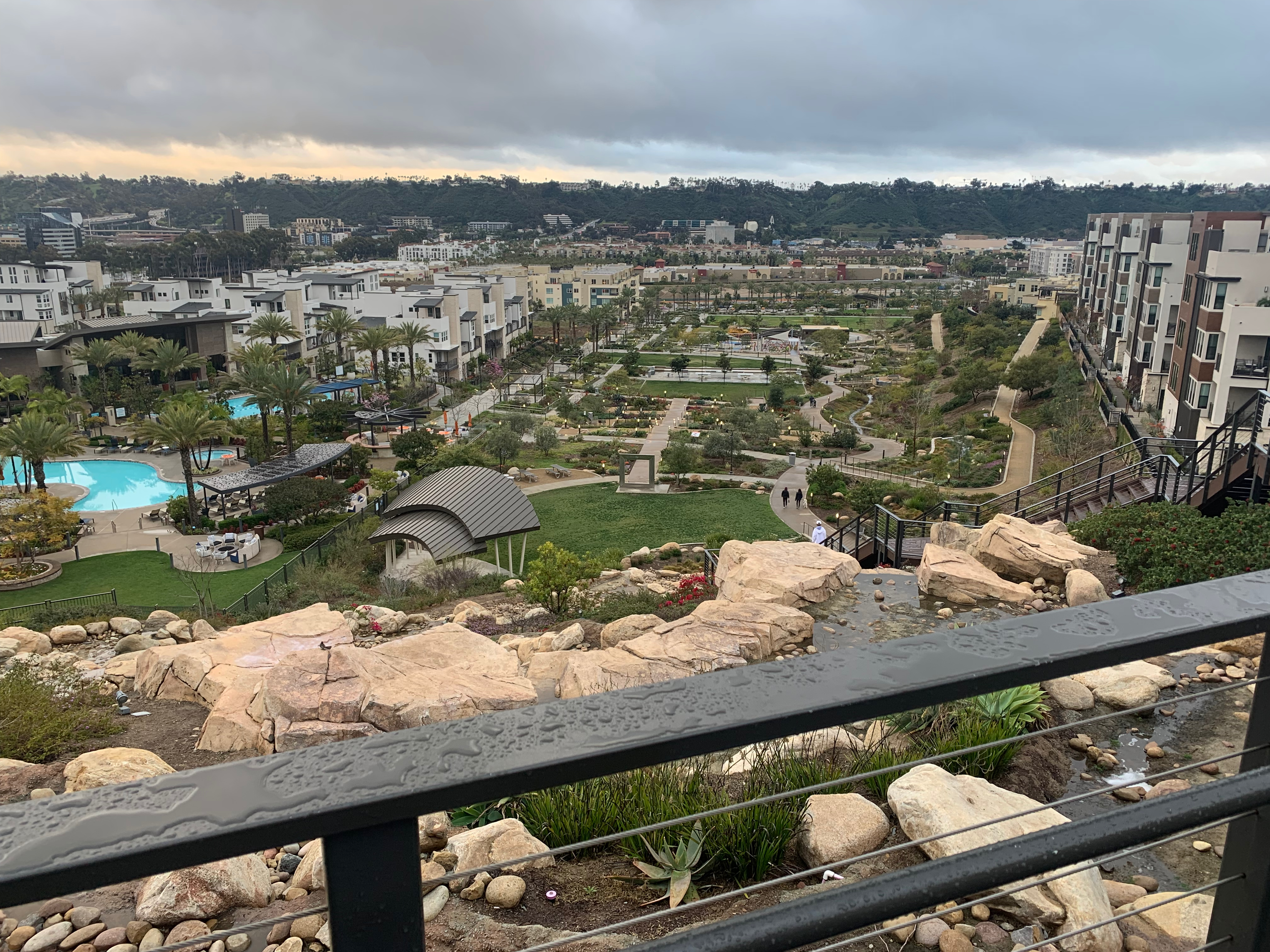
Civita Park

In 2013, following hundreds of public meetings and 10 years of planning, the San Diego Parks and Recreation Board approved the design of Civita’s central park, Civita Park. Construction of the park began in 2014 and was completed in 2015.

Civita Park slopes down the former quarry property in a series of mesas that provide residents with defined areas to exercise, relax, gather, or play. The park is connected by finger trails to adjoining neighborhoods. Vista points offer visitors panoramic views of the community and the San Diego River valley.

The construction includes a dog park, an outdoor amphitheater, an interactive water feature, a community garden, exercise nodes, a jogging path, two basketball half-courts, Bocce court, two playgrounds and a sandpit, restrooms and parking lots.
