= Marston Hills, San Diego =

Historic San Diego neighborhood interwoven into Balboa Park

Coordinates: 32.7433°N 117.1579°W

Marston Hills is a neighborhood within the Hillcrest community of San Diego, California. It is located within the northwestern corner of Balboa Park, and is generally bounded by Sixth Avenue to the west, Pennsylvania Avenue to the north, and Park Boulevard to the east, although some sources give California State Route 163 as the western boundary. The neighborhood is named after George Marston, an early San Diego businessman and philanthropist, whose house and grounds are located in the area.

The Marston Hills area is one of the older neighborhoods in San Diego, and has many large homes amid mature landscaping. The neighborhood has been proposed as a recognized historic district within the city of San Diego. The neighborhood was also the scene of one of San Diego's most infamous crimes: the murder of Dan Broderick by his ex-wife Betty Broderick.

Marston Hills directly abuts Balboa Park, and borders a camp of the San Diego-Imperial Council of Girl Scouts of the USA. The neighborhood also contains urban finger canyons with trails that connect to trails within Balboa Park.
