= Roseville-Fleetridge, San Diego =

Community in San Diego County, California

Coordinates: 32°43′43″N 117°14′7″W

Roseville-Fleetridge is a neighborhood in Point Loma, a community of San Diego, California. It is bounded by San Diego Bay and Rosecrans Street to the east, Cañon Street to the south, Catalina Boulevard to the west and Chatsworth and Nimitz Boulevards to the north. Neighboring communities are Point Loma Heights and Loma Portal to the north, Point Loma Village and Liberty Station to the east, La Playa and the Wooded Area to the south, and Sunset Cliffs to the west. It is actually two separate neighborhoods, Roseville and Fleetridge, which the city lumps together for policing purposes.

== Roseville ==
Roseville is the oldest settled part of Point Loma, and is named for its developer, San Diego pioneer Louis Rose. Rose bought the area in 1866, laid out streets, and built a wharf and a hotel. For a time, Roseville functioned as a separate city from San Diego. A plaque at the corner of Rosecrans Street and Avenida de Portugal (which was the intersection of First and Main streets when Roseville was an independent city) recognizes the establishment of Roseville in 1869.

Many Portuguese fishermen and fishing boat owners settled in the area, and it is still the focus of San Diego's large Portuguese community. Saint Agnes Catholic Church holds services in Portuguese twice a month and hosts the annual Festa do Espirito Santo (Feast of the Holy Spirit), a religious festival which has been staged every year since 1910 and is San Diego's oldest ethnic tradition. Some people refer to the area as “Tunaville” because of its association with the tuna-fishing fleet.

The east–west streets form part of what are known as the "alphabetical author streets". This series of streets begins in Roseville and continues into the adjacent neighborhood of Loma Portal, and is named for authors in alphabetical order from Addison to Zola, with a second partial cycle from Alcott to Lytton. The north–south streets are named after trees.

Roseville is served by Cabrillo Elementary School. Park and recreations facilities include Cabrillo Recreation Center and Cabrillo North and South mini parks.

== Fleetridge ==
The hilly area above Roseville is known as Fleetridge, named for its developer David Fleet, a son of Reuben H. Fleet. It was developed between 1950 and 1955. It is characterized by curved, terrain-following streets and large custom homes. It is entirely residential.

Dana Middle School is located at Chatsworth Street and Narragansett Avenue. Point Loma Park is located within Fleetridge.
