= Redwood Village, San Diego =

- Community of San Diego
- Redwood Village
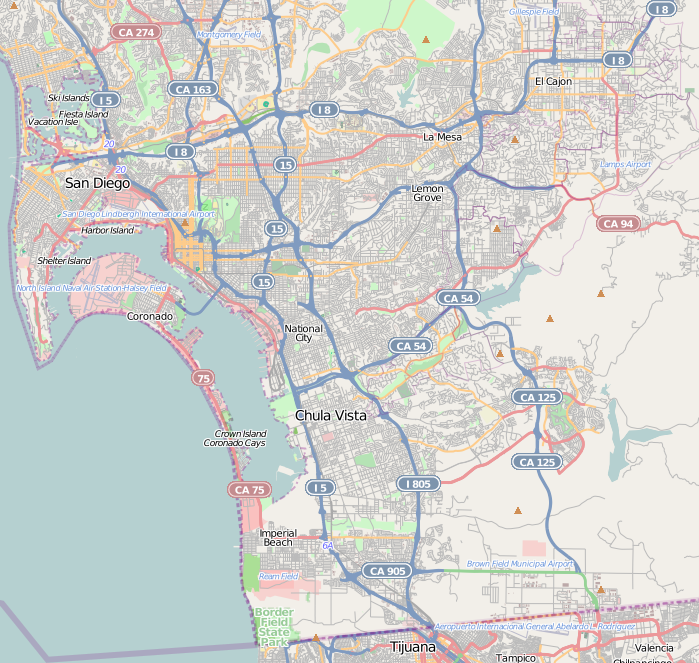
- Location within San Diego
- Coordinates: 32.746943°N 117.068714°W
- Country: United States of America
- State: California
- County: San Diego
- City: San Diego

Redwood Village is a neighborhood of the Mid-City region of San Diego, California. Formerly known as Darnall, on June 7, 2007, residents voted to change the name of the neighborhood to Redwood Village. Redwood Village is a mostly residential neighborhood, with the exception of the area South of university avenue which is home to the University Square Shopping Center.

== Geography ==
Redwood Village's borders are defined by 54th street to the West, University Avenue to the North, College Avenue to the East, and Streamview Drive to the South.

== Education ==
Redwood Village hosts an elementary schools.

- Darnall E-Campus Charter Elementary School (San Diego Unified School District)
