= Wooded Area, San Diego =

Community in San Diego County, California

Coordinates: 32°41′50.19″N 117°14′49.33″W

The Wooded Area is a neighborhood in Point Loma, a community of San Diego, California. It encompasses the hilltop area south of Talbot Street on both sides of Catalina Boulevard; the area west of Catalina is also referred to as the College Area. The Wooded Area borders Naval Base Point Loma to the south, La Playa to the east, Roseville-Fleetridge to the north, and Sunset Cliffs and Point Loma Nazarene University to the west. The boundaries of the neighborhood are not universally agreed upon, with different maps showing different borders.

The Wooded Area gains its name from the large number of Eucalyptus, evergreen, and other trees in the neighborhood. The mature vegetation, along with large lot sizes and lack of sidewalks, contribute to a semi-rural feel. The community is almost entirely residential, except for a small retail center at the corner of Catalina and Talbot streets, and Point Loma Nazarene University at the western edge of the community. Home prices in the area are relatively high and the neighborhood includes several striking mansions, including those built by Reuben H. Fleet, Robert O. Peterson, and Alfred and Marion Robinson.

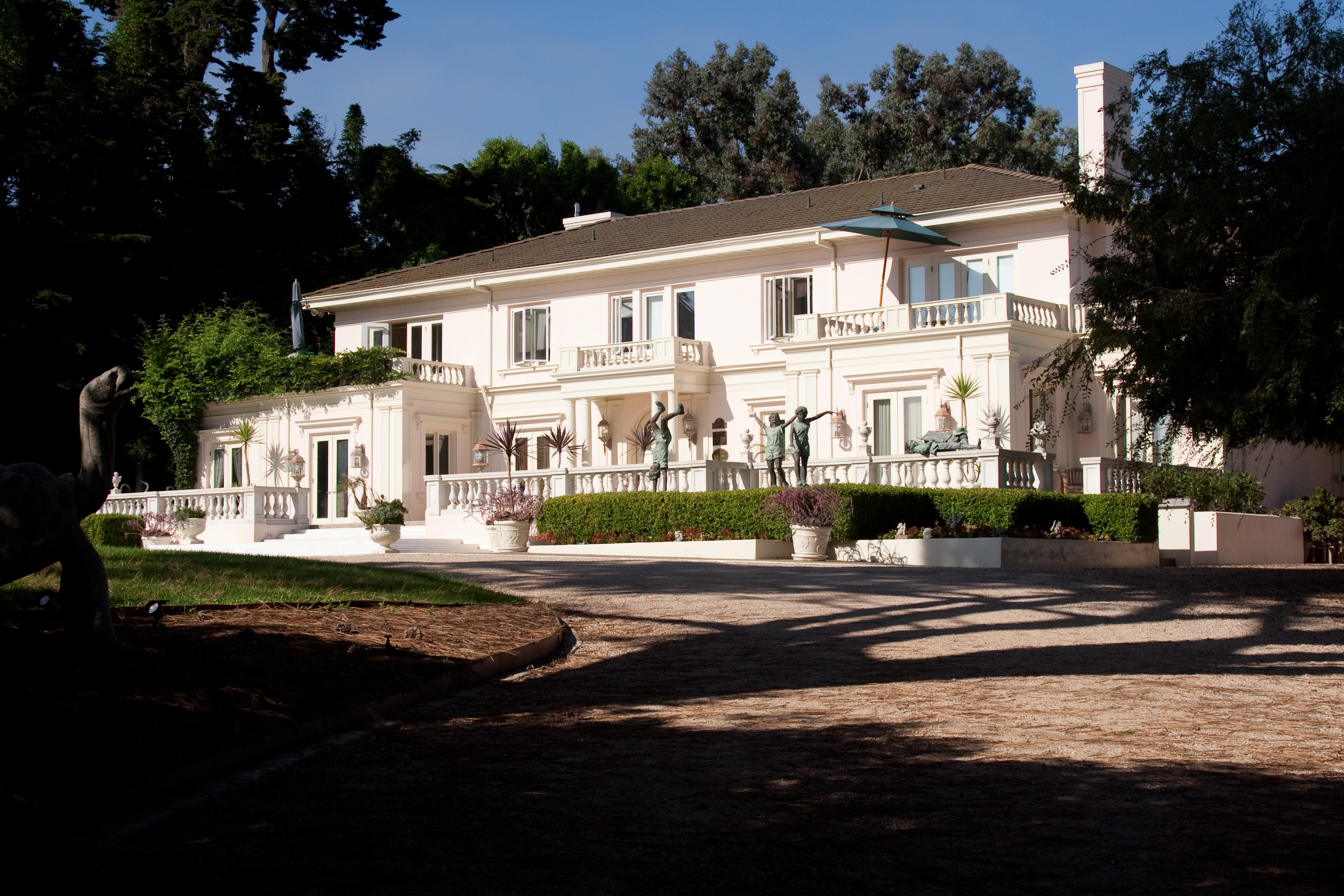
Rosecroft

When Richard Henry Dana Jr. visited San Diego in the 1830s, he described this part of Point Loma as "a well-wooded headland," where he and the other sailors gathered firewood and hunted rabbits. But the trees and brush were largely cut down for use in the growing town of San Diego, and by 1900 when Katherine Tingley created her Theosophical community Lomaland on the western side of what is now the Wooded Area, the area was completely devoid of trees and shrubs. One of Tingley's supporters described the barren slopes as "this God-forsaken spot." Tingley and her Lomaland community planted numerous orchards and trees throughout the area, particularly eucalyptus and avocado, and are generally credited with creating the "wooded" feel that the area enjoys today.

The Wooded Area was once home to Rosecroft Begonia Gardens, a several-acre begonia garden which was a tourist attraction for several decades. Rosecroft Begonia Gardens closed in the 1960s and was replaced by homes in the 1970s, but a historic stone wall and a street name commemorate the site. The gardens were originally part of the grounds of the 1912 estate "Rosecroft," which still stands and is listed on the National Register of Historic Places.
