= La Playa, San Diego =

- Community of San Diego
- La Playa
- Interactive map of La Playa, San Diego
- Coordinates: 32°42′44″N 117°14′43″W
- Country: United States of America
- State: California
- County: San Diego
- City: San Diego

California Historical Landmark
- Reference no.: 61

La Playa (Spanish, 'the beach') is a bayfront neighborhood in the Point Loma community of San Diego, California. It is bordered by San Diego Bay to the east, Naval Base Point Loma to the south, the Wooded Area neighborhood to the west, and Point Loma Village/Roseville-Fleetridge to the north. It lies across a channel from Shelter Island.

== Description ==
The bayside residential area now called La Playa lies somewhat north of the original La Playa, where commercial and military ships anchored during the early days of the city. The La Playa neighborhood includes some of the most expensive homes in San Diego. The neighborhood is mostly residential and contains two yacht clubs, San Diego Yacht Club and Southwestern Yacht Club. Some bayfront homes have private piers for small boats.

== Old La Playa ==
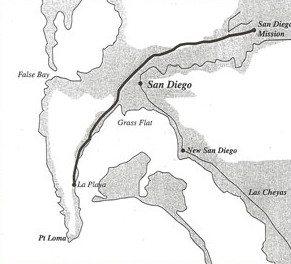
United States Boundary Survey of the San Diego, California area, 1850, showing the La Playa Trail from La Playa to Old San Diego and the Mission

The original area known as La Playa played an important role in the early history of San Diego. The first European to set foot in what is now California, Juan Rodriguez Cabrillo, came ashore in 1542 at La Playa, probably at a small rocky peninsula called Ballast Point. When a permanent European settlement was established a few miles inland in 1769, La Playa served as the town's "harbor", actually an anchorage where cargo was loaded and unloaded via small boats. Goods were then transported to the settlement by land over the historic La Playa Trail, the oldest European trail on the West Coast. The anchorage at La Playa continued to serve as San Diego’s main port until the establishment of New Town (current downtown) in the 1870s.

In his book Two Years Before the Mast, Richard Henry Dana Jr. describes how sailors in the 1830s camped on the beach at La Playa and hunted for wood and rabbits in the hills of Point Loma. The beach at La Playa became an informal town of up to 800 people during the Mexican years (1822–1846), centered on a dozen or so huge "hide houses" where cattle hides were processed and stored until they could be exported for sale. The hide houses were named for the Boston trading ships they served. The first and best known was the Brookline captained by James O. Locke, where the American flag was first raised over California (unofficially) in 1829. The La Playa harbor hosted vessels from almost every maritime nation in the world during this period.

The Old La Playa site was registered as California Historical Landmark #61 in 1932, and designated as a historical landmark by the San Diego Historical Resources Board in 1970.

The original La Playa landing place and Ballast Point are now on the grounds of Naval Base Point Loma. Nothing visible remains of the original sites, which are accessible to the public during the annual Cabrillo Festival and to scholars for occasional archeological digs. A lighthouse stood on Ballast Point from 1890 to 1960; currently there is a simple automated light on the site.

== Notable People ==
- Maureen O'Connor (b. 1946) - former Mayor of San Diego.
- Robert O. Peterson (1916-1994), businessman, philanthropist, founder of Jack in the Box restaurants, former first husband of San Diego mayor O'Connor.
