= Dana Middle School (San Diego) =

Coordinates: 32°43′58″N 117°14′24″W

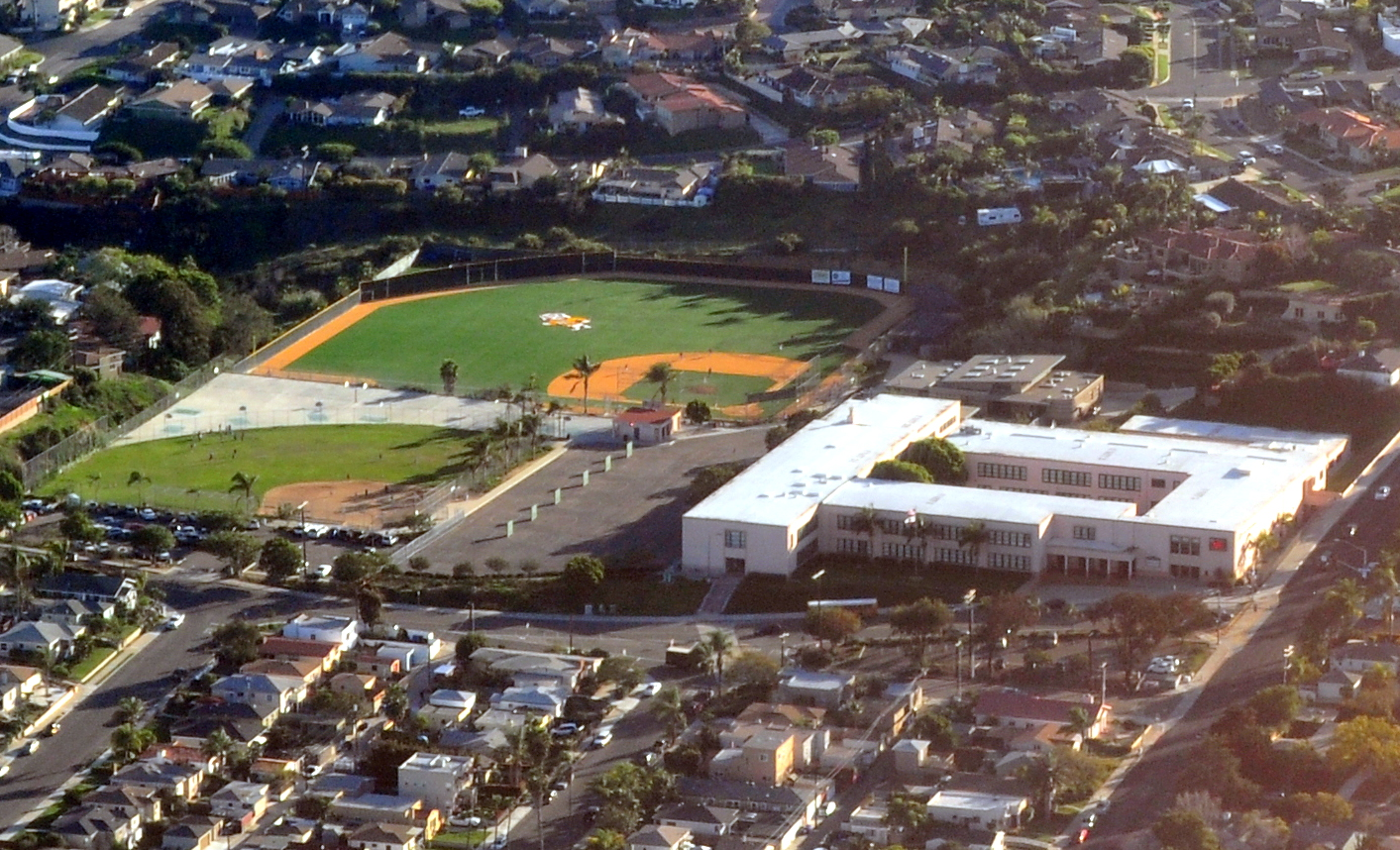
- Aerial view from the north

Location
- 1775 Chatsworth Blvd; Point Loma, San Diego, California, 92106; United States

Information
- Type: Middle School
- Motto: Learning Together @ Light Speed
- Established: 1941
- Principal: John Bosselman
- Grades: 5-6
- Enrollment: 646 (2024-25)
- Colors: Green and white
- Mascot: Mariner
- Website: www.danamiddle.com

Richard Henry Dana Middle School is a public middle school in San Diego, California. It is part of San Diego Unified School District. The school serves approximately 820 students in grades 5 and 6. It is located in the Loma Portal neighborhood of Point Loma. It draws students from all six elementary (K-4) schools in the "Point Loma Cluster", as well as accepting students on a space-available basis from throughout the district under the District's Volunteer Enrollment Exchange Program (VEEP) and Open Enrollment Program.

== History ==
Dana is named after Richard Henry Dana Jr., author of the book Two Years Before the Mast which described the San Diego and Point Loma areas in the 1830s.

Before the opening of Dana, students in grades 7-12 attended Point Loma Junior-Senior High School, now Point Loma High School. The dates of Dana's opening are not entirely clear. A review of Point Loma High School yearbooks suggests that Dana opened in 1941 for 7th-graders only, served grades 7-8 from 1942 through 1945, and became a full 7-8-9 junior high school in the fall of 1945. This format was retained until Dana's closure in 1983. During the 1940s-1950s the school doubled as a Cold War era bomb shelter.

In 1983, the school was closed as part of sweeping changes occasioned by declining enrollment. Prior to the realignment, two area junior high schools (Dana and Collier) served grades 7-9, and fed Point Loma High School which served grades 10-12. After the realignment, Dana was closed; Collier was renamed after artist Steven V. Correia and restricted to grades 7-8; and Point Loma High became a four-year school serving grades 9-12.

In the wake of the closure, the school district clashed with local residents. The district sought to lease or divest the Dana site; community activists, led by Ann Tripp Jackson (then president of the Point Loma Association), lobbied for its reopening as a school. Jackson's efforts led, among other victories, to the school site's being permanently rezoned for educational use. During the protracted battle, however, the site stood vacant for 10 years.

Finally, it was reopened in 1993 to serve as a school district office building. Community support for returning Dana to its use as a school remained strong. In 1998, state-mandated school occupancy guidelines provided the final impetus for reopening Dana as a school. Another major realignment of local schools took place, with local elementary schools becoming K-4, and Dana reopening as a central school for all local 5-6 graders: 1998-1999 for grade 6, expanding to grade 5-6 in 2001-2002. This alignment — one middle school for grades 5–6 and one for grades 7-8 — is unique in the district. The school's auditorium was christened the Ann Tripp Jackson Auditorium to honor Jackson and others who led the successful preservation effort.

In October 2011 the school district proposed closing Dana and a dozen other district schools as a cost-saving measure. The closure of Dana would have saved the district an estimated $500,000 and sent Point Loma area fifth graders back to elementary school, while combining grades 6, 7 and 8 at Correia Middle School. Despite the potential cost savings, the district withdrew the proposal after a community outcry, including a "save our schools" rally at Dana attended by 600 people.

== Campus ==
The campus includes a softball field and a baseball field; the latter is the home field for Point Loma High School baseball. It is named for Major League pitcher David Wells, a PLHS alumnus. In 2014 the school district approved a plan proposed by Wells to replace the grass at Wells Field with artificial turf and perform other upgrades. The upgrade was completed and dedicated in December 2014. Wells now serves as head baseball coach at PLHS.

== Student life ==
Extra-curricular student programs offered at Dana include:

- Instrumental Music
- Surf Club
- Student Newspaper, the Dana Globe

They also have a wide range of electives, which include:

- Intro to Video
- Gateway to tech
- Advanced Stem
- Orchestra
- Band
- Guitar
- TSS (This is the elective for students who make the Dana Broadcast videos. They also plan spirit days and other events.)
