= Oak Park, San Diego =

- Community of San Diego
- Oak Park
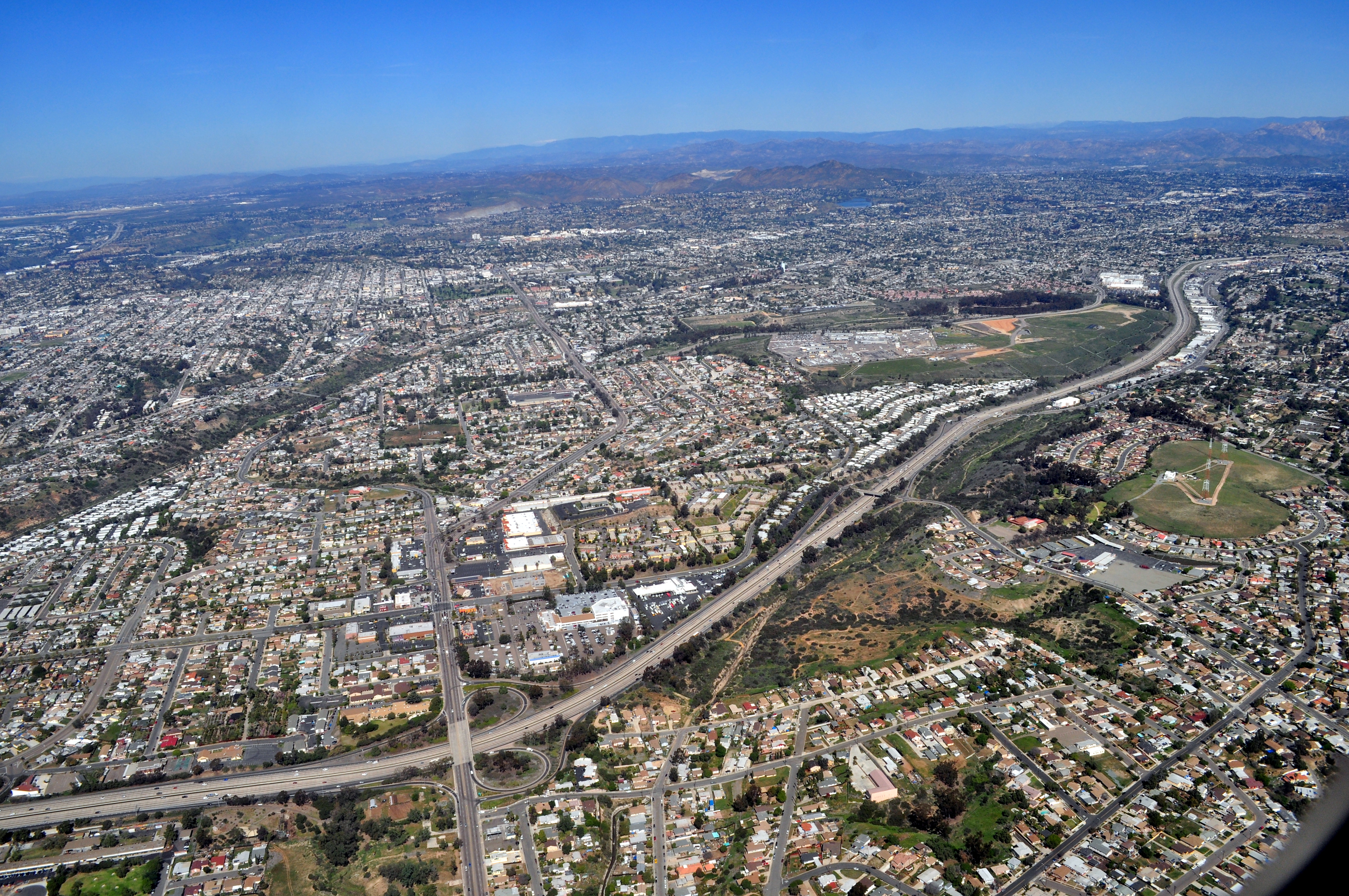
- 2015 aerial photo of Oak Park

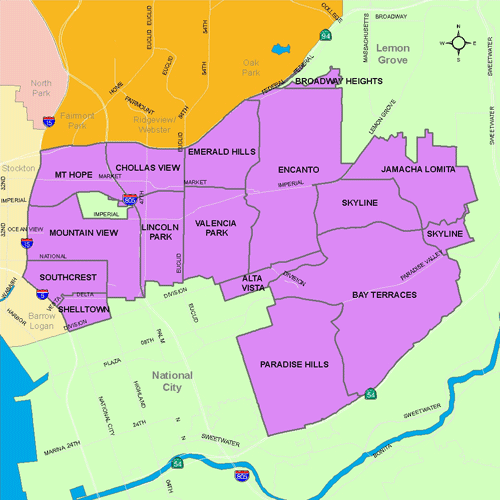
- Oak Park is located in the southeastern area of the city of San Diego

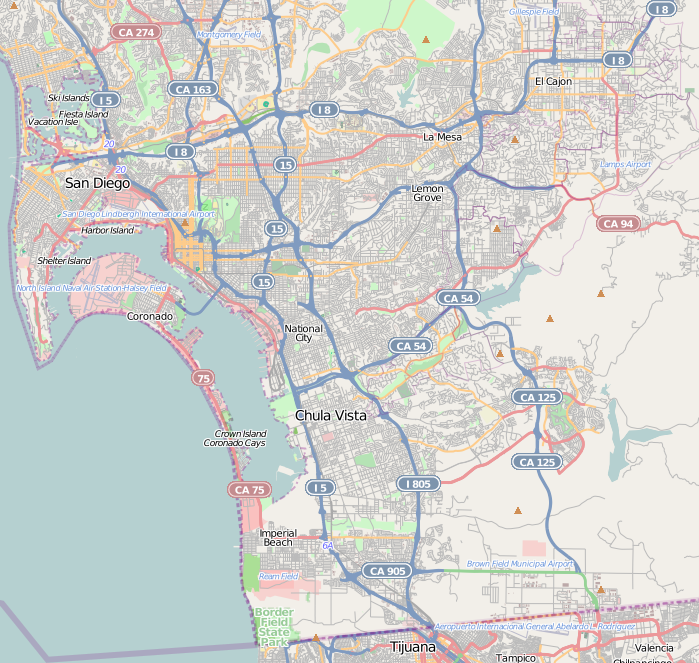
- Location within San Diego
- Coordinates: 32.7359°N 117.0797°W
- Country: United States of America
- State: California
- County: San Diego
- City: San Diego
- ZIP Code: 92105

Oak Park is an urban neighborhood in the Southeast region of San Diego, California.

== Geography ==
The neighborhood's borders are defined by Euclid Avenue to the west, Chollas Parkway/Streamview Drive/College Avenue to the north, and State Route 94 to the southeast.

== Demographics ==
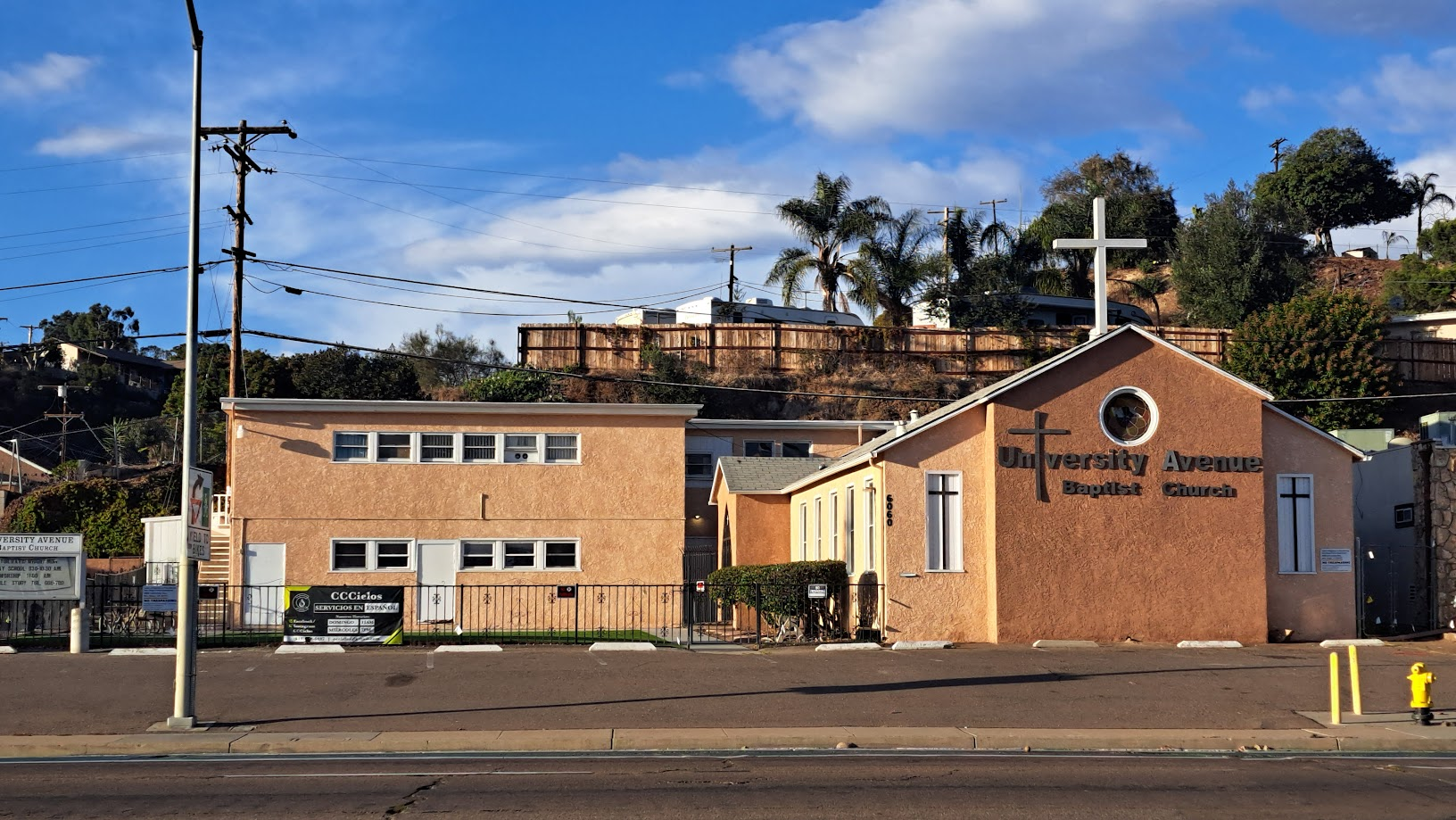
University Avenue Baptist Church

Oak Park is home to one of the higher concentrations of African-Americans in the city. As of November 2020, demographics for the neighborhood are as follows: people of Hispanic/Latino heritage make up 31.2%, followed by Asians at 25.8%, then African-Americans at 22.0%, non-Hispanic Whites at 16.5%, Mixed Race at 3.7%, and others at 0.8%.

== Development ==
Oak Park is characterized by single family homes, condominiums and apartments, as well as Navy housing.

Oak Park is divided between City Council District 4 and District 7. It has a fire station and a branch of the public library. It's community organization is the Oak Park Community Council.

Chollas Lake 16-acre (65,000 m^{2}) is a lake designated for free youth fishing (age 15 and under); a 0.8 mile dirt path around the lake for walking, jogging, and bicycling; picnic tables with barbecue grills; children's play equipment; a small basketball court; hiking trails; and a multi-purpose ball field in North Chollas canyon.

== Education ==
Oak Park hosts two elementary schools.

- Oak Park Elementary School (San Diego Unified School District):Oak Park Elementary Music Conservatory Magnet School enrolls grades kindergarten through 5th grade.
- Carver Elementary School (San Diego Unified School District)

== Economy ==
Oak Park is located four miles (6 km) from San Diego State University. The community is home to a large mall, the Marketplace at the Grove Shopping Center.

The center originally opened as a traditional shopping mall called College Grove with various national chain retail stores. It was the first shopping center in central San Diego in the Post-War era.

Close to the end of the 1990s, there was a plan to revitalize the dead mall, which included the redevelopment of the mall into strip mall with many big box retailers.
