= Sunset Cliffs, San Diego =

Community in San Diego County, California

Coordinates: 32°43′47.02″N 117°15′09.21″W

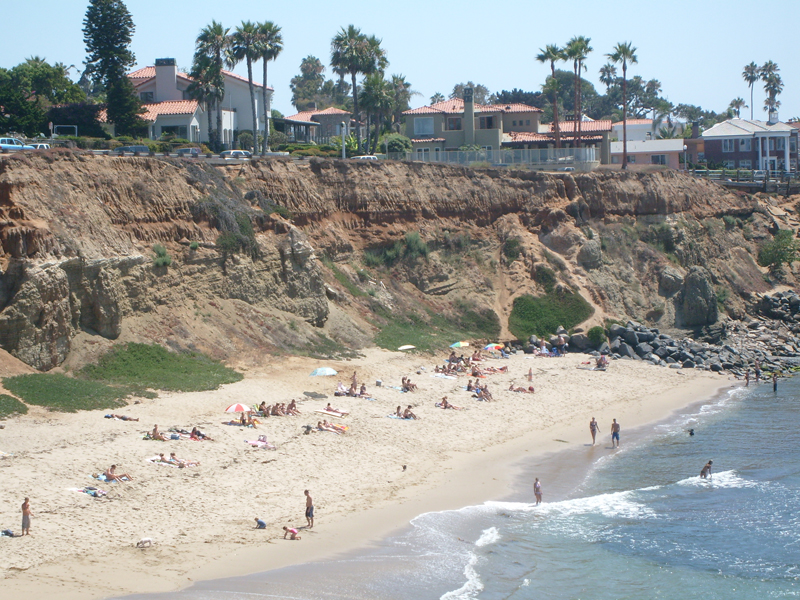
People swim at a beach at the base of the Sunset Cliffs

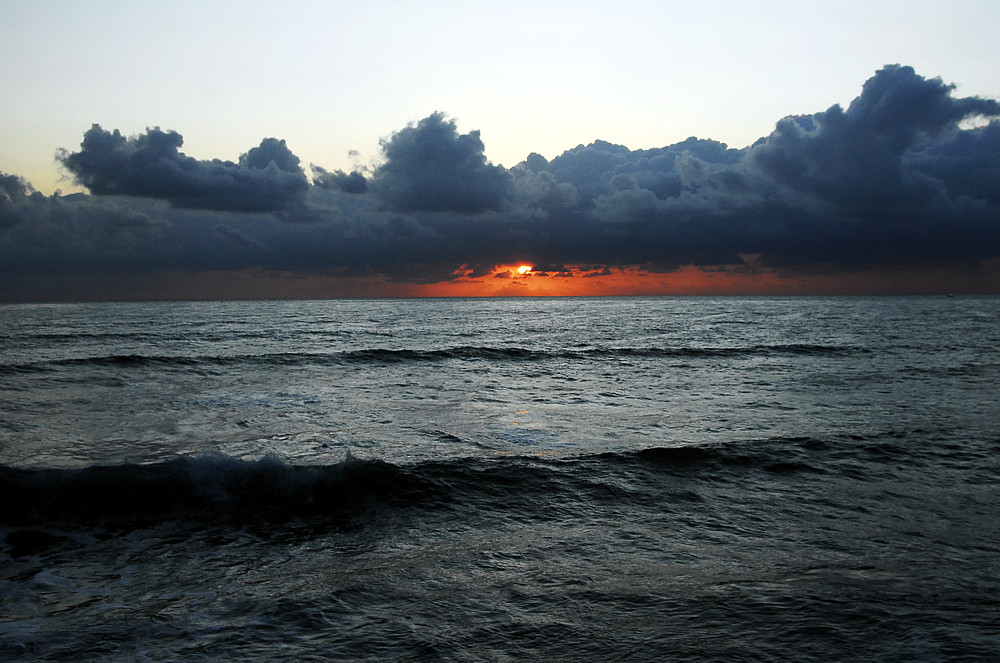
Sunset over the Pacific Ocean, as seen from Sunset Cliffs

Sunset Cliffs is an affluent coastal community in the Point Loma community of San Diego, California. It is bordered by the Pacific Ocean to the west, Ocean Beach to the north, Catalina Blvd. and Santa Barbara St. to the east, and Sunset Cliffs Natural Park to the south.

The area is named for the sheer cliffs which border the ocean. There are surfing spots below the cliffs. The cliffside trails are popular for walking and for watching the sunset, but are undeveloped and can be dangerous. Falls from the cliffs have resulted in deaths and injuries.

The main street of the area is Sunset Cliffs Blvd. The neighborhood is almost entirely residential, with curved contour-following streets and custom homes. A small commercial strip is found along the northern end of Sunset Cliffs Blvd. running into Ocean Beach. The area contains Sunset View Elementary School, part of San Diego Unified School District, as well as a private elementary/middle school called Warren-Walker School.

== History ==
American Kumeyaay Indians used to travel through Sunset Cliffs to gather seafood from the intertidal areas on the beach below the cliffs. They also gathered various forms of plant life in the area.

During the 1915 Panama–California Exposition, Albert Spalding developed the Linear Section of the cliffs. He spent around $2 million to hire Japanese architects to construct bridges, trails, benches and a stairway into the ocean. Spalding called his estate Sunset Cliffs Park, which then lent its name to the neighborhood.

In 1925, John P. Mills bought the property and surrounding area and developed it into a residential neighborhood. Mills spent approximately $1 million to restore the features created by Spalding. Later the City of San Diego acquired the Spalding property from Mills and turned the coastal strip into a city park. The creations Spalding built were affected by the weather and wave action and eventually eroded. After the features had deteriorated significantly the city deemed the area unsafe and removed all the creations Spalding constructed.

== Sunset Cliffs Natural Park ==
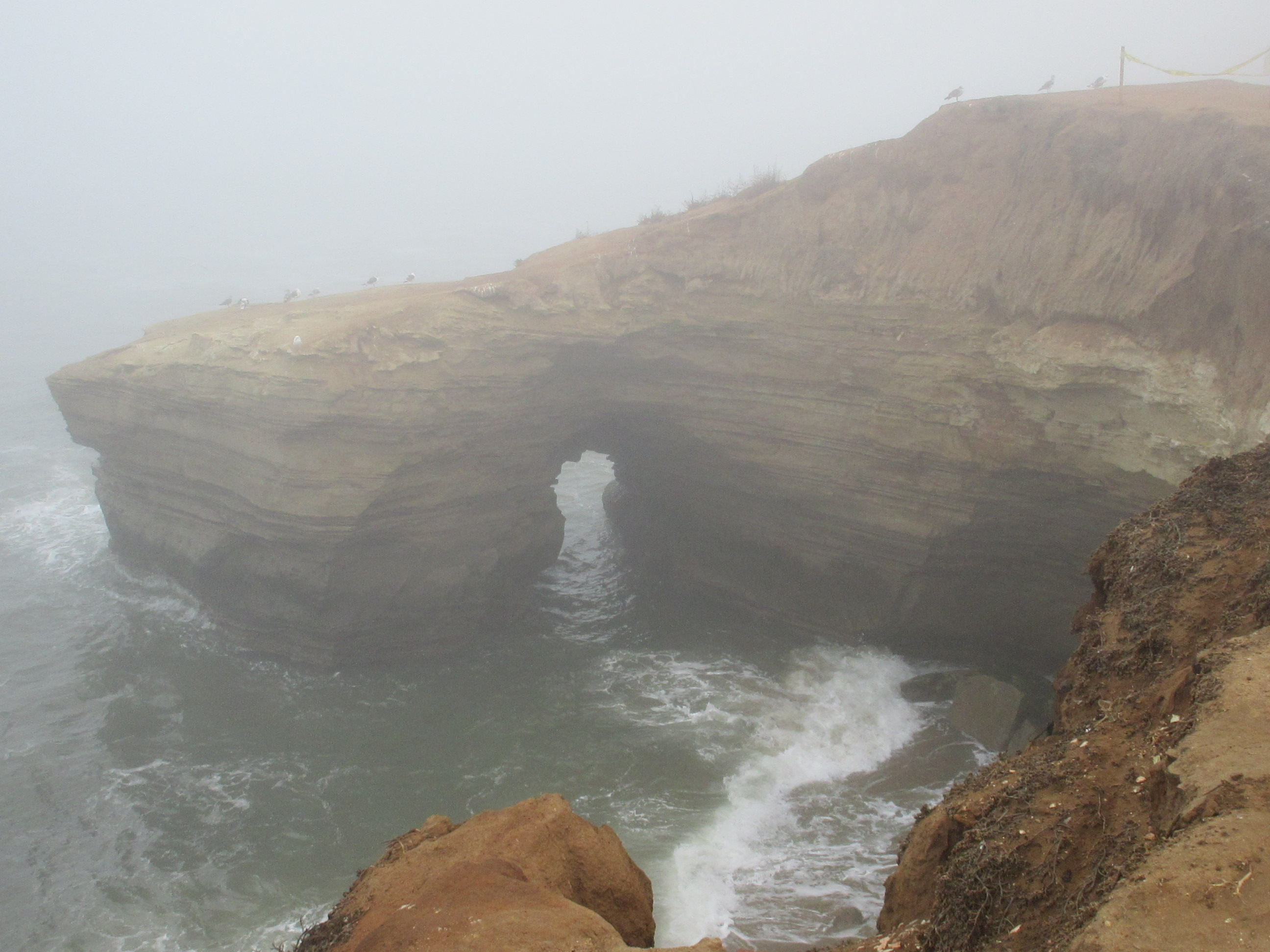
A sea arch in the nature park as it appeared on a foggy morning

Sunset Cliffs Natural Park is a 68-acre (28 ha) city park adjacent to the Pacific Ocean on the western edge of Point Loma. It includes the entire strip of land immediately adjacent to the ocean, between the water and Sunset Cliffs Boulevard, as well as a larger area of undeveloped park and nature preserve on the south side of the area. It was dedicated in 1983. It stretches from Adair Street to Ladera Street. This coastal strip is connected to the 640-acre (260 ha) Point Loma Reserve. The park includes carved coastal bluffs, arches and sea caves. From the cliffs, the California gray whale can be seen migrating annually from the Bering Sea to Baja California. The park is a popular place to view the sunset, hence the name.

== Luscombs Point ==
The Luscomb Point area, at the end of Hill Street, is named after Happy Luscomb, a local resident who often surfed the area. Luscomb point is a popular location for weddings and sunset viewing.

== Accidents ==
An unnamed 17 year old teenager suffered six compression fractures to his vertebrae and required nine stitches in his foot after attempting a dangerous jump off of sunset cliffs. This accident was recorded and went viral on social media, the video shows the young man jumping off and then people rushed across to save him and keep him afloat. After this incident the teen talks about how dangerous it was, and how he only did this because of viral videos he saw on tiktok of other teenagers attempting the same thing successfully. He also pushes on how horrible it felt and urges other people not to attempt the same

== In popular culture ==
- Portions of the 2000 film Almost Famous were filmed at Sunset Cliffs.
- The Inn at Sunset Cliffs is the filming location for the Mars' residence in Veronica Mars.
- Friend of the World was filmed at Sunset Cliffs, resembling a juxtaposition to a modern era.
