= Loma Portal, San Diego =

Neighborhood in Point Loma, San Diego County, California

Coordinates: 32°44′32″N 117°14′7″W

Loma Portal (from Latin porta "gate") is a neighborhood in the community of Point Loma in San Diego, California. It is a hilly area northwest of Rosecrans Street and northeast of Nimitz Boulevard, overlooking San Diego Bay.

== Features ==
Loma Portal is home to Point Loma High School, Dana Middle School, and several elementary schools. Also, Plumosa Park, a 1.4-acre passive park, is located in Loma Portal. The neighborhood also includes the James Edgar and Jean Jessop Hervey Point Loma Branch Library, which opened in 2003, replacing a smaller public library. The area is primarily residential, with a business and retail center located on Voltaire Street.

Loma Portal lies directly under the takeoff flight path for nearby Lindbergh Field, making it the home of the “Point Loma Pause” where all conversation ceases temporarily because of airplane noise.

Loma Portal is known throughout San Diego for its neighborhood holiday decorations. Several blocks of Garrison Street near Chatsworth are particularly known for elaborate decorations. Also, a neighborhood-wide lighting of luminarias occurs each Christmas Eve in the Plumosa Park area.

Major north-south roads are Rosecrans Street, Chatsworth Boulevard and Catalina Boulevard. Many of the east-west roads are broken into several disconnected segments due to the steepness of the terrain. The east-west streets form part of what are known as the "alphabetical author streets." This series of streets begins in the adjacent Roseville neighborhood of Point Loma and is named for authors in alphabetical order from Addison to Zola, with a second partial series from Alcott to Lytton. Another distinctive feature of this neighborhood is the placement of street lights in the middle of intersections instead of on the sidewalks. A 2014 book, Reading Between the Lampposts, gives details about each of the authors for whom the streets are named, as well as referencing the unusual street lights.
