= University City, San Diego =

- Community of San Diego
- University City
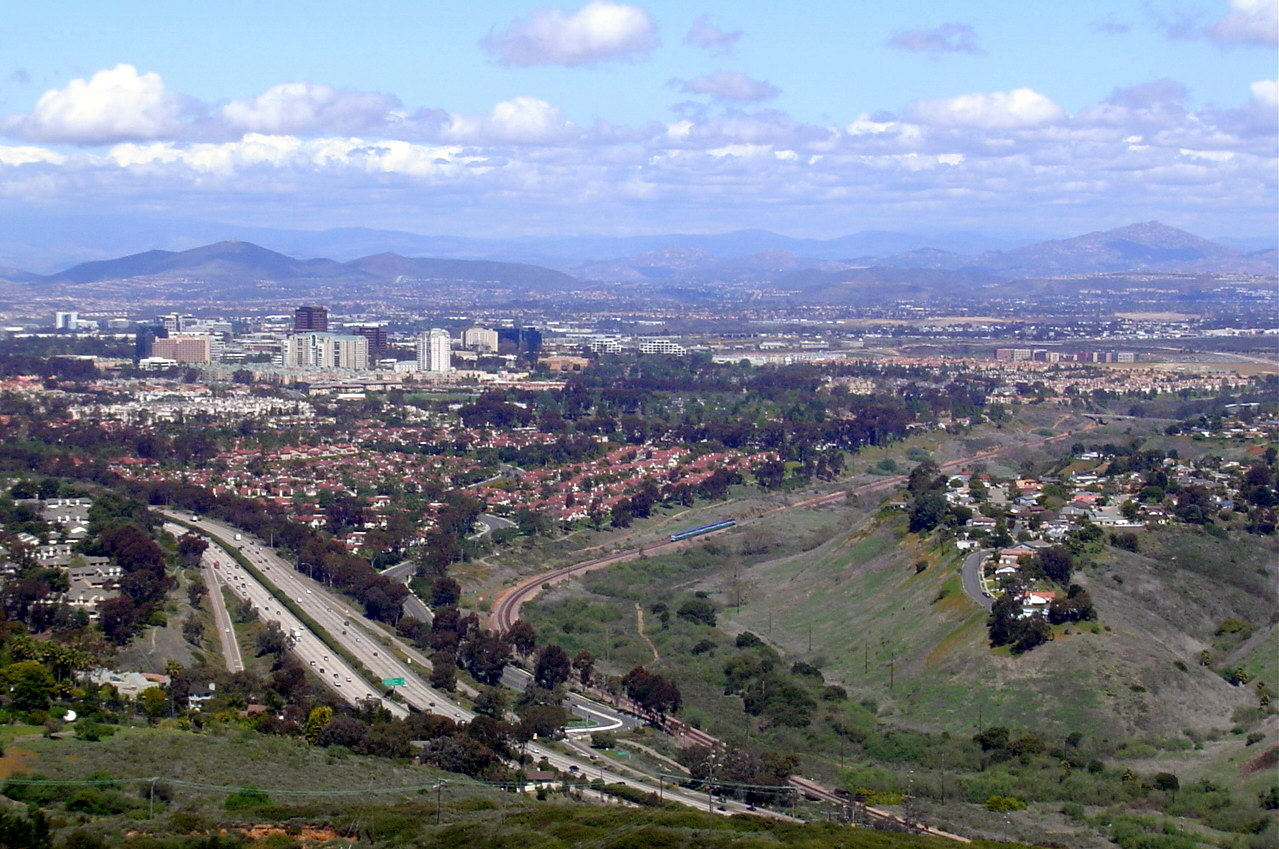
- University City
- Nickname: "UC"
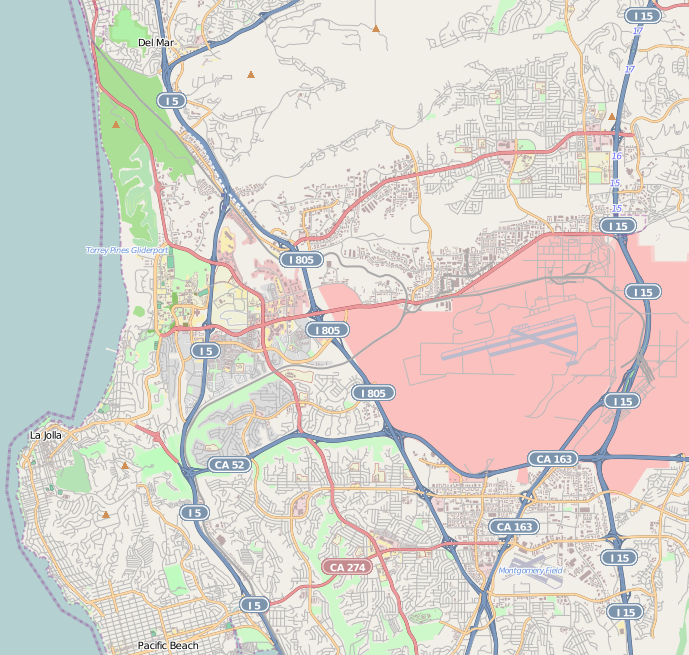
- Location within Northwestern San Diego
- Coordinates: 32°52′N 117°13′W
- Country: United States of America
- State: California
- County: San Diego
- City: San Diego
- Area code: 858

University City (UC) is a community in San Diego, California, located in the northwestern portion of the city next to the University of California, San Diego. The area was originally intended to serve as housing for the faculty of the university, hence the name.

University City is enclosed by a triangular boundary. To the west, it is bordered by La Jolla, Torrey Pines, and Interstate 5. To the east, it is bordered by Miramar, Sorrento Mesa, Sorrento Valley, and Interstate 805. To the south, it is bordered by Clairemont, North Clairemont, and State Route 52. University City is sometimes referred to as The Golden Triangle. University City is a part of Council District 6, which is represented by Council President Pro Tem Kent Lee on the San Diego City Council.

The northern half of the community hosts Westfield UTC mall. Together with adjacent commercial areas along I-5 and I-805, University City forms part of San Diego's "North City edge city", the largest such concentration in the county.

== History ==
The area was previously inhabited by the Kumeyaay, where a trade route connecting the villages of Jamo (Pacific Beach), Onap (Rose Canyon), and Ystagua (Sorrento Valley) once existed through what is now Gilman Dr. The route was then adopted into the El Camino Real under the Spanish.

Prior to the establishment of UCSD, the area was largely referred to as Selwyn from the late 1800s.

Camp Calvin B. Matthews was built in 1917 upon US entry in WWI, which was largely used as a rifle range base. The base closed in 1964 to make way for UC San Diego.

University City was a master planned community of 2500 acres acquired in 1959 from Sawday-Sexton. Originally University City was supposed to serve as a residential haven for the University of California, San Diego employees and students, where both college presidents and janitors would be able to live in the same community.

On March 10, 1989, a pipe bomb attached to the minivan of a woman exploded while she was driving near the University Towne Center mall. She was the wife of Will C. Rogers III, the captain of the USS Vincennes (CG-49) who gave the order to shoot down Iran Air Flight 655. She escaped the blast. Initially, it was suspected to be a terrorist retaliation for the downing of the airliner, but the investigation shifted away from this hypothesis. At this time, the bombing is still unsolved.

The San Diego California Temple of the Church of Jesus Christ of Latter-day Saints was completed in 1993. It is the 45th operating temple of the LDS Church in the world.

On August 1, 2003, arson by the Earth Liberation Front, an eco-terrorism group, destroyed a housing complex under construction at the east side of UC. It destroyed a 50 million dollar housing sprawl project Many residents awoke to find popcorn-shaped ashes littering their backyards and streets.

On December 08, 2008 at approximately 11:00 AM (PST) a USMC military jet F/A-18 bound for MCAS Miramar nearby military base crashed into several homes destroying them on the southeast corner of Cather Avenue and Huggins Street. The pilot ejected and was not injured. There were four civilians killed on the ground by the impact and fire that followed.

In November 21, 2021, the San Diego Trolley Blue Line opened for service upon the completion of the Mid-Coast Corridor Transit Project, which serves the University City area at UTC Transit Center, Executive Drive station, and UC San Diego Health La Jolla station.

On February 17, 2024, "El Chato" of the Tijuana Cartel was killed on the driveway to the parking garage of the Palisades on Nobel Drive after he and an unidentified man were shot in a targeted shooting.

== Geography ==
The campus of the University of California, San Diego, from which the area derives its name, is to the west of the center of the neighborhood. Many of the professors teaching at UCSD live in the neighborhood.

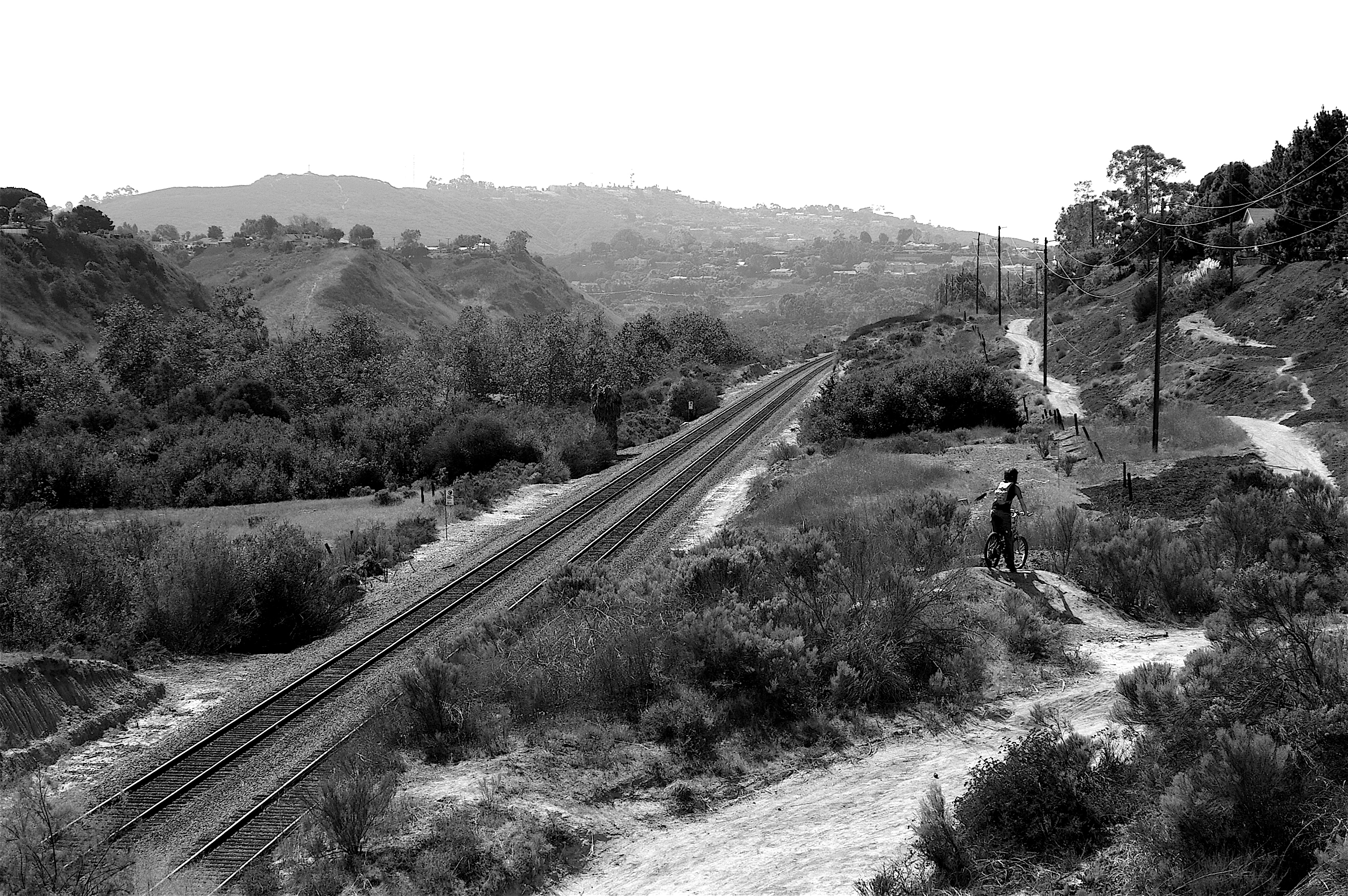
Rose Canyon, the natural border that divides north and south University City.

There are two distinct parts of University City divided by Rose Canyon, featuring the Rose Canyon Open Space preserve, and railroad tracks passing through it. South of Rose Canyon lies the older part of University City, built out in the 1960s-1980s and historically referred to as University Square, centered on Governor Drive. It is a mostly residential neighborhood along Governor Drive with many single family homes. In this area, just southwest of the Governor Drive exit from I-805 is a commercially zoned area containing office parks with low-rise buildings.

The topography of University City includes mesas and canyons such as Rose Canyon, San Clemente Canyon, and finger canyons that provide much of the open space. The canyons provide wildlife habitats with about 100 bird species migrating through the area plus natural views and opportunities for hiking, biking, and birding. The canyons are fire-managed and thus present small wildfire risks. In addition, motorists drive around the canyons, with I-5, Genesee Avenue, and the I-805 being about 1 mile apart from each other.

=== Neighbors ===
University City's neighbors include:

- to the south: Clairemont
- to the west: La Jolla
- to the east: Miramar and Marine Corps Air Station Miramar
- to the north: Sorrento Valley and Mira Mesa

=== Fauna and flora ===
The wildlife in Rose Canyon has over 99 species of birds including the California gnatcatcher and California least tern which are considered endangered and listed federally as threatened species. The flora of the Rose Canyon is known for its vernal pools. The pools are located on the east end of the canyon adjacent to the Marine Corps Air Station Miramar (MCAS Miramar). Endemic endangered species have included the Orcutt's brodiaea (Brodiaea orcuttii), San Diego button celery (Eryngium aristulatum parishii), San Diego golden star (Muilla clevelandii), spreading navarretia (Navarretia fossalis), prostrate navarretia (Navarretia prostrata), California adder's tongue fern (Ophioglossum californicum), California Orcutt grass (Orcuttia californica), and San Diego mesa mint (Pogogyne abramsii).

== Economy ==
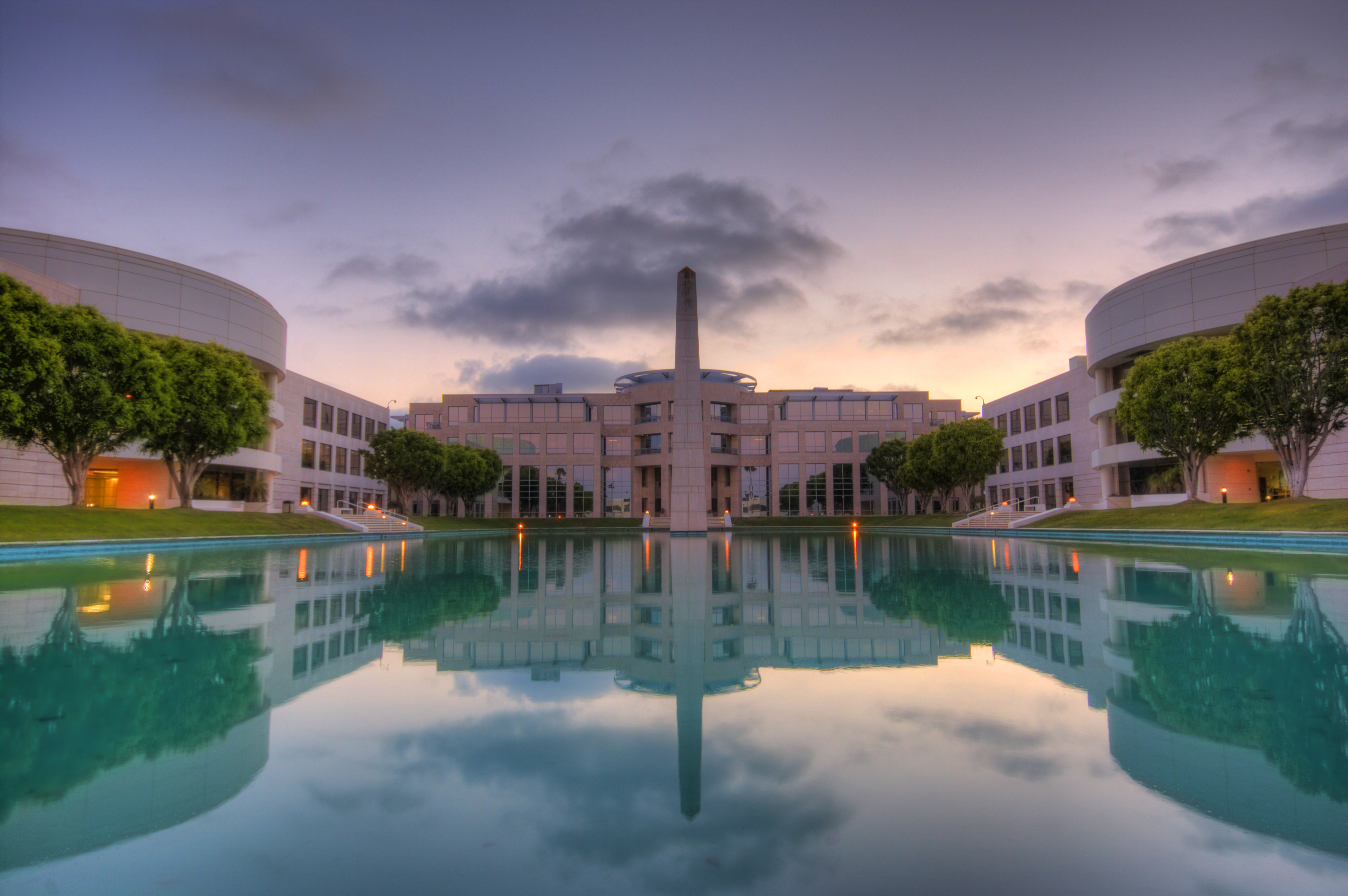
An office campus in University City

With its large academic, office and retail facilities, University City forms part of adjacent commercial areas in Sorrento Mesa/Sorrento Valley, Torrey Pines, and Del Mar Heights/Carmel Valley – to form San Diego's "North City edge city", edge city being a major center of employment outside a traditional downtown.

University City's economy is anchored by the University of California, San Diego campus which forms the north part of the community. University City has also become a major corporate center in the San Diego region with many real estate, legal, accounting, consulting and other professional services firms relocating from offices in downtown to be closer to clients in the northern parts of the city. Thousands of workers commute from across San Diego County to University City daily. It is one of the region's most significant economic centers.

Besides containing three local shopping centers, there is also a large regional shopping mall referred to as Westfield UTC. This shopping mall is located at the southeast corner of the intersection of Genesee Avenue and La Jolla Village Drive, and is anchored by Nordstrom and Macy's. With over 9.5 million square feet, it is the largest office space market in the county after downtown San Diego. The northeastern mesas of University City started to be developed for industrial and corporate uses in late 1980s to early 1990s, and are home to several biotech, technology, and professional services firms among other businesses. The northern part of University City also contains two major hospitals, Scripps Memorial and UCSD's Jacobs Medical Center, with surrounding medical office buildings. Development and re-development of this area continues today. University City was the site of a 2003 fire bombing of a condominium complex, causing 50 million dollars in damage to the La Jolla Crossroads apartments. The ostensible reason for the bombing concerned the overdevelopment of northern University City.

University City also has multiple parks, three elementary schools, a middle school, and a high school. Solana Beach based private school Fusion Academy opened a campus in 2016. This campus is located inside the Summers Governor Park complex on Shoreham Place. University City is home to a police and fire station, both respectfully sharing the Northern Division name.

The University Square shopping center at Governor Drive and Genesee Avenue is anchored by a Vons grocery store and previously a Rite Aid pharmacy which closed in 2025. Another shopping center to the west at Governor Drive and Regents Road is anchored by Sprouts Farmers Market. A third shopping center is located in the "La Jolla Colony" area in north University City, and it is also anchored by a Vons grocery store.

== Transportation ==
The Rail Authority has mentioned University City as a possible location for a California High-Speed Rail station. However, the location has been removed from current consideration.

Currently, the area is served by the SuperLoop bus rapid transit which circulates through the area, local bus service provided by San Diego Metropolitan Transit System and North County Transit District, and the Blue Line (San Diego Trolley) which connects the area to Old Town (San Diego), downtown San Diego, South Bay, San Diego, and the San Ysidro Port of Entry. Also, the University City Tunnel has been proposed for existing Pacific Surfliner and Coaster service. However, with an estimate cost of over $450 million, it is not considered a high priority.

The only major road connecting North Clairemont to Torrey Pines is the four-lane Genesee Avenue that runs north-south directly through the middle of University City. The City of San Diego also wants to extend Regents Road by building a bridge over Rose Canyon. This plan has been strongly opposed by a local group calling itself Friends of Rose Canyon. The argument has been going on for years.

=== Regents Road bridge ===
During the original planning of University City, Regents Road was planned to be connected by a bridge running through Rose Canyon. With so much construction going on at the same time, Regents Road was put on hold and was not connected from Governor Dr to Nobel Dr. Forty years later, the canyon is now surrounded by residential neighborhoods.

Some residents want the bridge constructed due to the time it takes for emergency vehicles to be transported between southern and northern University City. The fire department claimed that: "A bridge or the widening of Genesee Avenue would shorten response time for emergency vehicles in the neighborhood. It has one of the slowest response times in the city." Along with emergency centers nearby, Rose Canyon provides the perfect environment for wildfires in UC. An emergency such as that would require evacuation, which for the citizens of UC would only leave one escape route, Genesee, already one of the busiest streets in the city.

Other residents want to cancel the construction of the bridge due to the disruption to wildlife and the community. The proposed bridge would be across Rose Canyon.

== Education ==
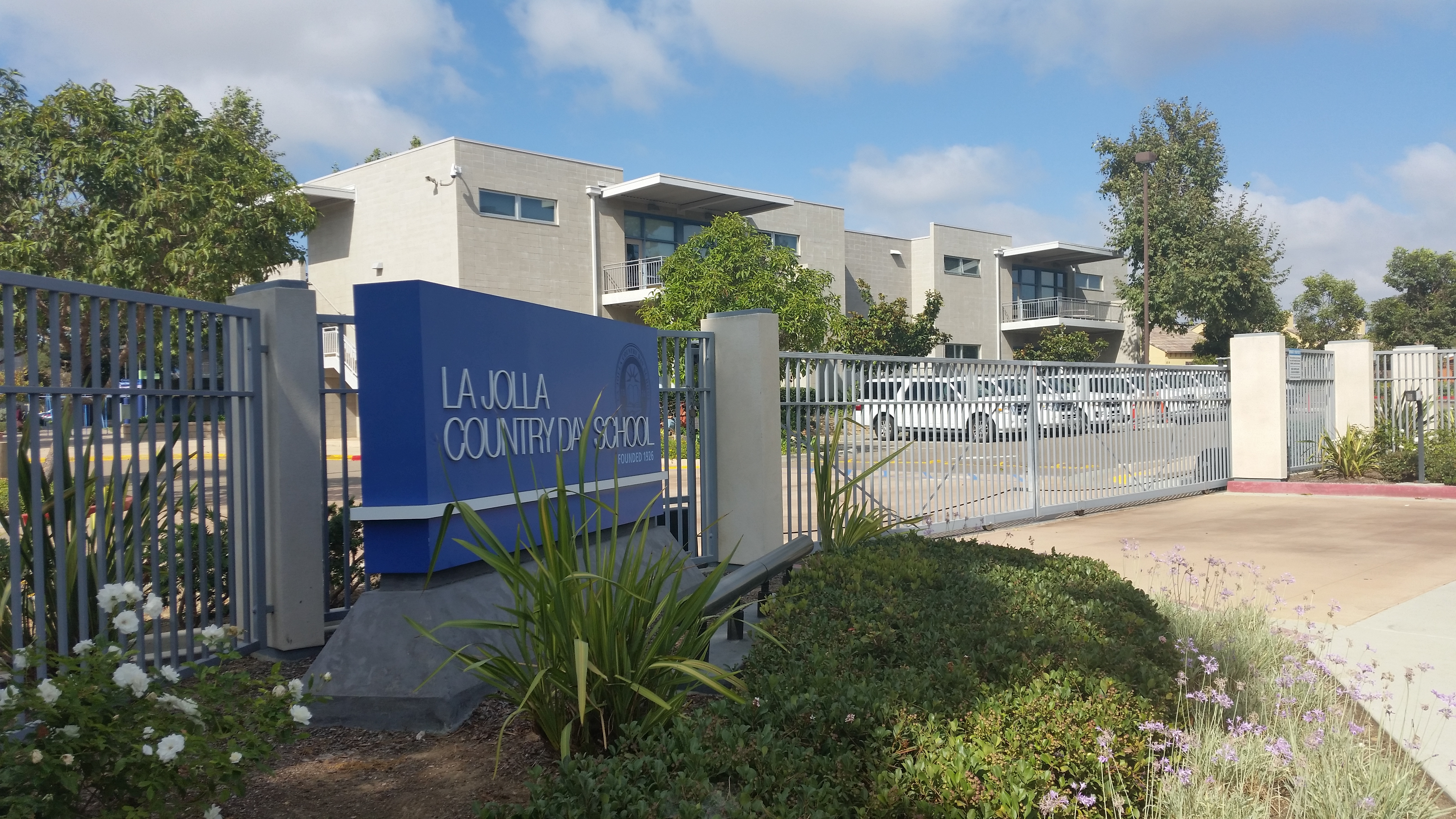
La Jolla Country Day School

There are five public schools in University City:

- Marie Curie Elementary School
- John D. Spreckels Elementary School
- Doyle Elementary School
- Standley Middle School
- University City High School

There are three private schools in University City:

- Mission Bay Montessori Academy (preschool - 6th grade
- La Jolla Country Day School (preschool - 12th grade)
- Fusion Academy San Diego (6-12th grade)

== Culture ==
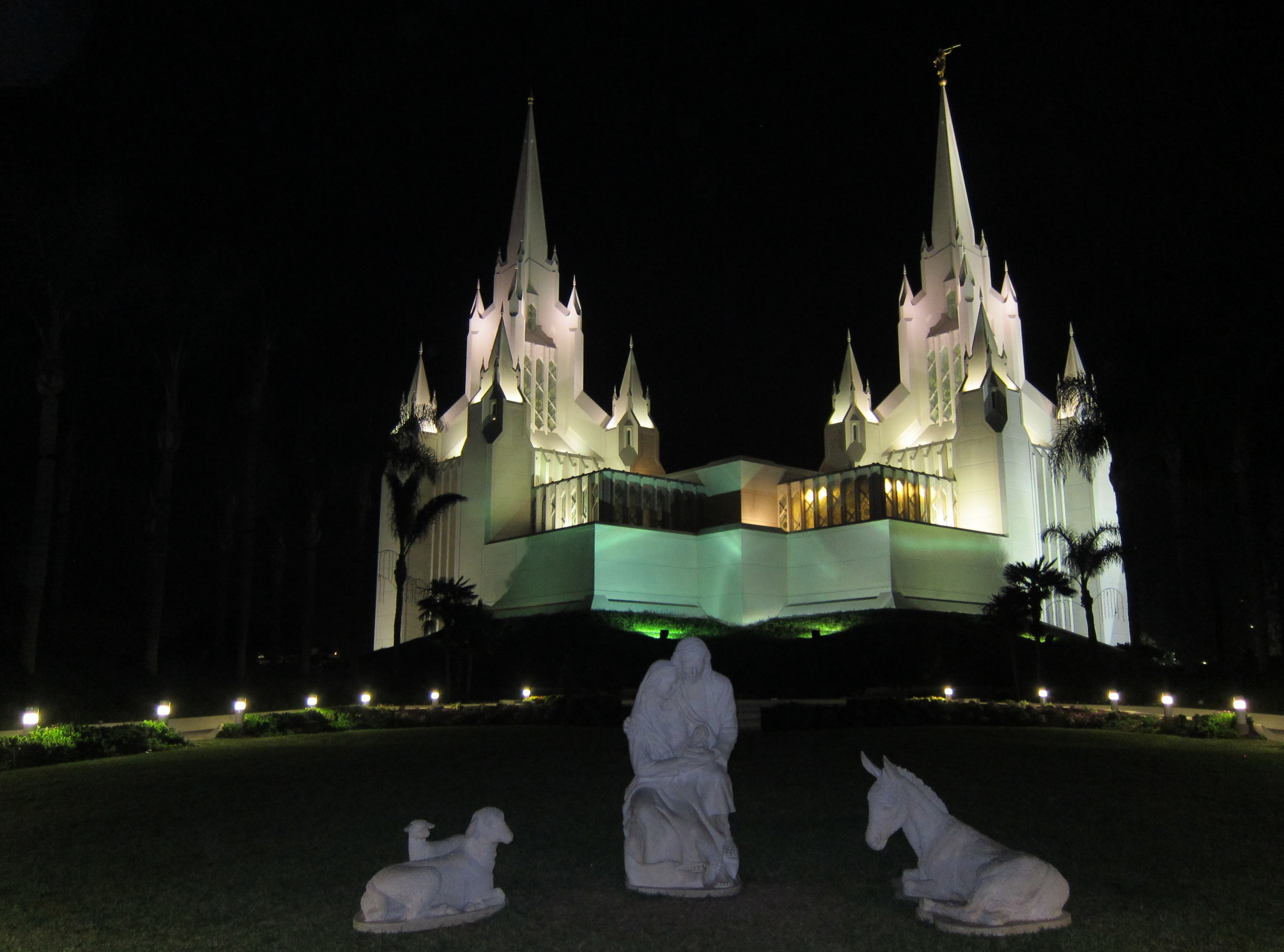
The San Diego California Temple

- San Diego Public Library
  - North University Community Library
  - University Community Library

== Recreation ==
Several golf courses are recognized as children-friendly, unique in the area:

- The University City Golf Course has 9 holes, with a par 27. Most holes are about 100 yards (91 m) long or less, except the 6th, which is 140 yards (130 m). As of October 2019, this course has closed.

Several community and neighborhood parks and recreation centers are also available:

- Standley Recreation Center and Park
- Doyle Recreation Center and Park includes an off-leash dog park with two fenced areas to keep large and small dogs separated.
- La Jolla Colony Park
- Rose Canyon Open Space Park
- Marcy Park - 5500 Stresemann Street
- Tot Lot at University Village Park - Corner of Florey and Cather Streets
- University Gardens Park - Corner of Governor Drive at Gullstrand Street
