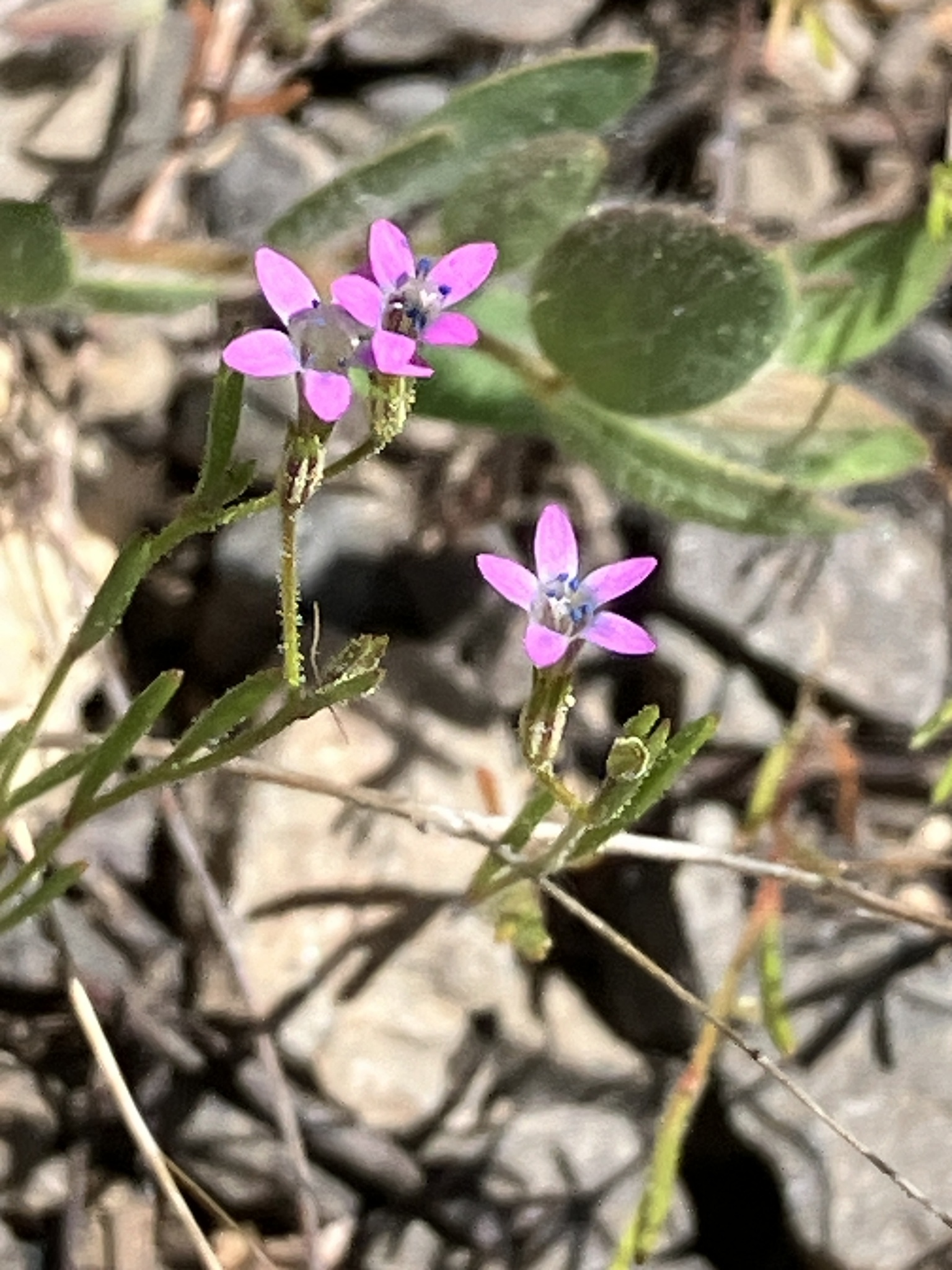
- In Oregon

Conservation status
- Apparently Secure (NatureServe)

Scientific classification
- Kingdom: Plantae
- Clade: Embryophytes
- Clade: Tracheophytes
- Clade: Spermatophytes
- Clade: Angiosperms
- Clade: Eudicots
- Clade: Asterids
- Order: Ericales
- Family: Polemoniaceae
- Genus: Navarretia
- Species: N. sinistra

Binomial name
- Navarretia sinistra (M.E.Jones) L.A.Johnson

Synonyms
- Allophyllum sinistrum; Collomia sinistra; Gilia sinistra

= Navarretia sinistra =

Plant species in the phlox family

Navarretia sinistra (formerly Gilia sinistra) is a species of flowering plant in the phlox family known by the common name Alva Day's pincushionplant.

== Description ==
Navarretia sinistra produces a branching, leafy stem coated in knobby glands. The leaves are sometimes deeply cut or lobed.

The inflorescence produces generally 2 or 3 flowers on very thin stalks. Each flower has a pouchlike calyx of sepals which are ribbed with reddish membranous tissue between. The tubular flower has a pink corolla and a red-streaked yellow throat. The protruding stamens are tipped with blue anthers.

The bloom period is June to August.

== Taxonomy ==
In 1902 Marcus E. Jones described a new species in the Gilia genus which he named Gilia sinistra. It was moved to Collomia in 1907 by August Brand and to Navarretia in 2000 by Leigh Alma Johnson. The species has not always been accepted with it being listed as a synonym of Gilia capillaris in Vascular Plants of the Pacific Northwest in 1955 and in the Intermountain Flora in 1984. It has no subspecies and three homotypic synonyms.

Table of Synonyms
Name	Year
Allophyllum sinistrum (M.E.Jones) A.G.Day & V.E.Grant	1998
Collomia sinistra (M.E.Jones) Brand	1907
Gilia sinistra M.E.Jones	1902

== Distribution and habitat ==
The plant is native to the western United States, where it grows in northern California, Nevada, and eastern and western Oregon. Far to the east it has been found in Routt County, Colorado.

It is native to mountain chaparral, sagebrush scrub, yellow pine forest, red fir forest, and lodgepole forest habitats, often on volcanic or serpentine soils. It grows at 50–2,700 metres (160–8,860 ft) in elevation.
