= Hera Hub =

Female Focused Workspace

- Type: Private
- Industry: Coworking
- Founded: December 2, 2015; 10 years ago in San Diego, California
- Founder: Felena Hanson
- Products: Workspaces with a focus on female freelancers and entrepreneurs
- Website: herahub.com

Hera Hub is a female-focused coworking space and business accelerator founded in San Diego, California, United States.

== History ==
The first company-owned location was launched in Sorrento Valley in August 2011. The second location was launched in Mission Valley in October 2012 and the third company-owned location was launched in Carlsbad, California, in July 2013. The space is known to have a "spa-inspired" atmosphere and a collaborative environment.

The founder, Felena Hanson, licensed the business model in 2015 and now has two additional locations in the United States, located in Washington, D.C. and Phoenix, Arizona. The first international location was opened in Uppsala, Sweden, in August 2017.

The company offers freelancers, consultants and entrepreneurs access to flexible workspace in a productive environment. Mentoring and educational programming is offered on a daily and weekly basis. Members have access to publicly funded programs through Hera Labs and angel investment capital through events like the Hera Venture Summit.

Hera Hub mission is to provide entrepreneurial women with a productive, professional work and meeting space, where they can connect with a like-minded community to collaborate and flourish.

Niche coworking spaces like Hera Hub continue to be part of a global trend.
