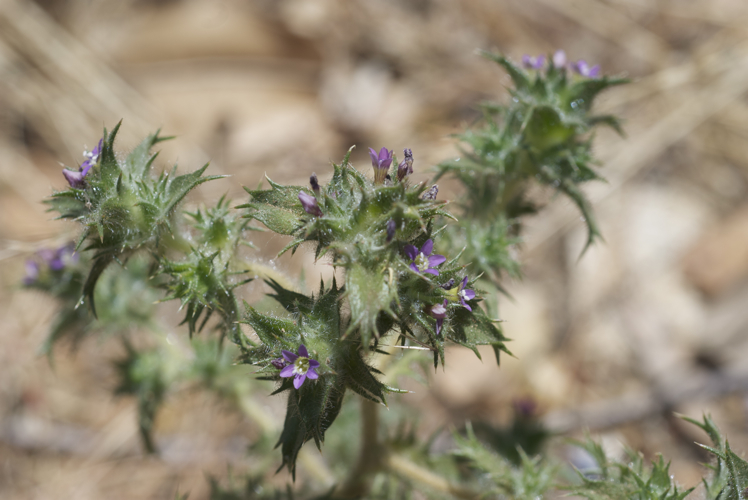

Scientific classification
- Kingdom: Plantae
- Clade: Tracheophytes
- Clade: Angiosperms
- Clade: Eudicots
- Clade: Asterids
- Order: Ericales
- Family: Polemoniaceae
- Genus: Navarretia
- Species: N. atractyloides

Binomial name
- Navarretia atractyloides (Benth.) Hook. & Arn.

= Navarretia atractyloides =

Species of flowering plant

Navarretia atractyloides is a species of flowering plant in the phlox family known by the common name hollyleaf pincushionplant.

It is native to the coastal mountain ranges of western North America from Oregon through California to Baja California, where it grows in open areas in local habitat types. It is similar to Navarretia hamata, but lacks the skunky scent of that species.

It is a hairy, glandular annual herb approaching 30 centimeters (12 in) in maximum height. The leaves are strap-shaped with abrupt divisions into small, narrow teeth at intervals. The inflorescence is a head filled with spine-toothed, leaflike bracts. The flowers tucked amidst the bracts are light purple or occasionally white, with reddish veining in their tubular throats. The flower is just under a centimeter long and has a five-lobed corolla.
