= Del Mar Heights, San Diego =

Neighborhood in San Diego, California

Coordinates: 32°56′33″N 117°14′49″W

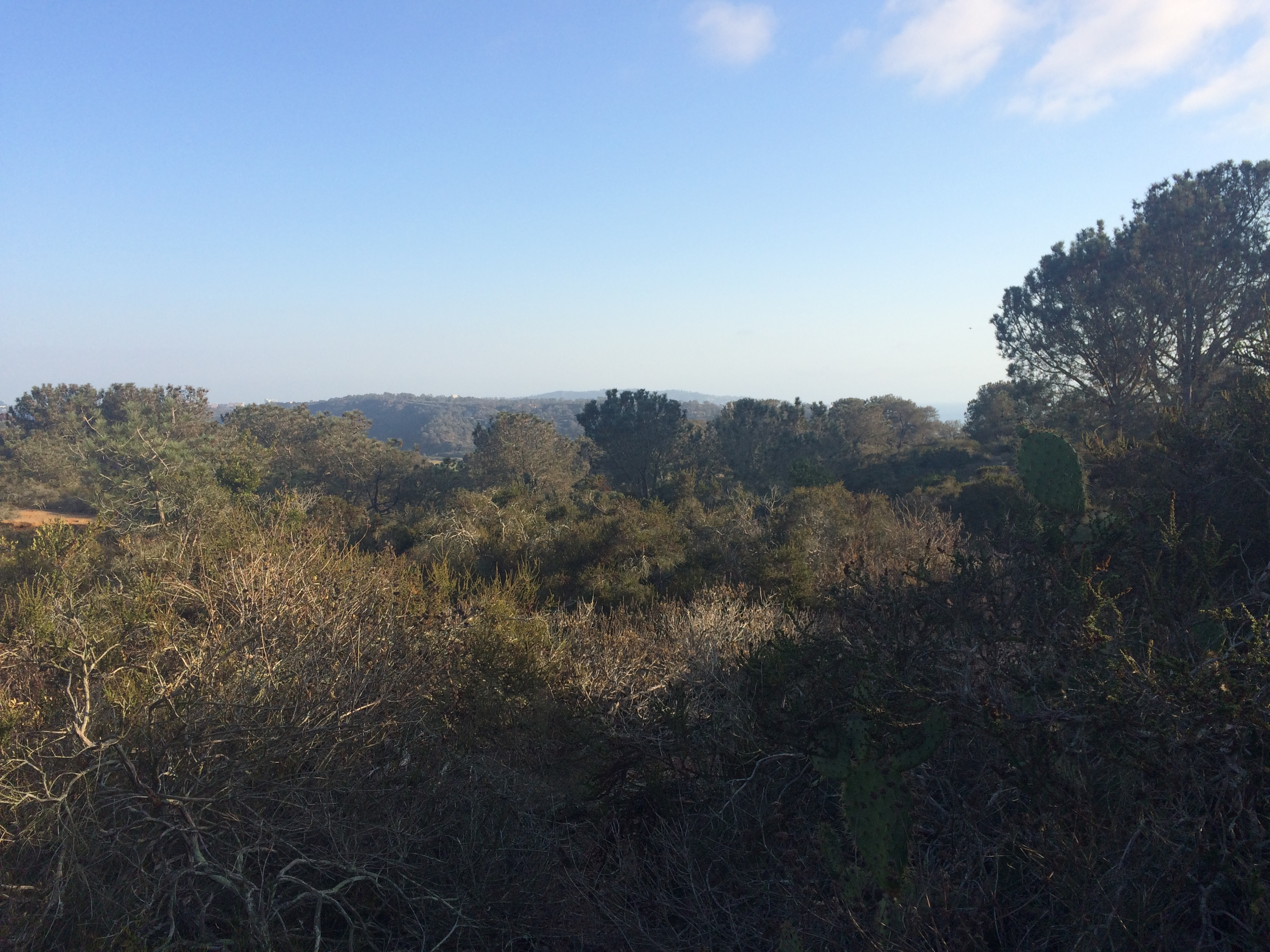
Del Mar Heights, San Diego, CA 92014, USA

Del Mar Heights is an upscale neighborhood near the coast in San Diego, California, United States, bordered by Solana Beach to the north, North City and Carmel Valley to the east, Del Mar to the west, and Torrey Pines to the south. I-5 forms the eastern boundary. It is noted for its hills.

The large office, retail, entertainment and academic facilities in University City a.k.a. UTC (over 9 million sq. ft. of office space), Sorrento Mesa/Sorrento Valley (also over 9 million sq. ft.), Torrey Pines (over 2.6 million sq. ft.), and Del Mar Heights/Carmel Valley (over 4.4 million sq. ft.), together form San Diego's "North City edge city", edge city being a major center of employment outside a traditional downtown.
