= Navarretia rosulata =

Conservation status
- Imperiled (NatureServe)

Scientific classification
- Kingdom: Plantae
- Clade: Tracheophytes
- Clade: Angiosperms
- Clade: Eudicots
- Clade: Asterids
- Order: Ericales
- Family: Polemoniaceae
- Genus: Navarretia
- Species: N. rosulata

Binomial name
- Navarretia rosulata Brand

Species of flowering plant

Navarretia rosulata is a rare species of flowering plant in the phlox family known by the common names San Anselmo navarretia, Marin County navarretia, and Marin County pincushionplant.

== Distribution ==
The plant is endemic to California, where it is known from only about 20 occurrences in Marin and Napa Counties.

It grows in chaparral and closed-cone pine forest habitats of the Northern California Coast Ranges, from 200–600 metres (660–1,970 ft) in elevation.

It is endemic to rocky serpentine soils.

Conservation

The plant is an Endangered species on the California Native Plant Society Inventory of Rare and Endangered Plants.

== Description ==
Navarretia rosulata is a hairy, glandular annual herb growing up to 13 centimetres (5.1 in) tall. It has a skunky scent. The leaves are divided into many linear lobes.

The inflorescence is a cluster of many flowers surrounded by leaflike bracts and hairy, glandular sepals. The flowers are white to lavender in color, tube-throated, and just under 1 centimetre (0.39 in) long. The bloom period is May to July.

=== Taxonomy ===
This plant was considered a subspecies of Navarretia heterodoxa (Navarretia heterodoxa ssp. rosulata) until 1993, when it was separated and named a distinct species.
