= Navarretia jaredii =

Scientific classification
- Kingdom: Plantae
- Clade: Tracheophytes
- Clade: Angiosperms
- Clade: Eudicots
- Clade: Asterids
- Order: Ericales
- Family: Polemoniaceae
- Genus: Navarretia
- Species: N. jaredii

Binomial name
- Navarretia jaredii Eastw.

Species of flowering plant

Navarretia jaredii is an uncommon species of flowering plant in the phlox family known by the common names mitrefruit pincushionplant and Paso Robles navarretia.

It is endemic to California, where it is known from the central and south coasts and coastal mountain ranges. It grows in several types of local habitat, including chaparral, grassland and vernal pools, and slopes of serpentine soils.

It is a hairy annual herb producing a slender stem up to about 20 centimeters tall. The lower leaves are divided into needlelike lobes, the upper toothed and coated in white hairs. The herbage is green or red in color. The inflorescence is a head of flowers lined with hairy, glandular bracts. The flowers are roughly a centimeter in length and tubular in shape, the tubular throats white in color and the five rounded corolla lobes deep blue.
