= Navarretia jepsonii =

Scientific classification
- Kingdom: Plantae
- Clade: Tracheophytes
- Clade: Angiosperms
- Clade: Eudicots
- Clade: Asterids
- Order: Ericales
- Family: Polemoniaceae
- Genus: Navarretia
- Species: N. jepsonii

Binomial name
- Navarretia jepsonii (V.Bailey) Jeps.

Species of flowering plant

Navarretia jepsonii is an uncommon species of flowering plant in the phlox family known by the common name Jepson's pincushionplant, or Jepson's navarretia.

It is endemic to California, where it is known only from the Inner North Coast Ranges west of the Sacramento Valley. It grows in grassland and chaparral and oak woodland habitat, often on serpentine soils.

It is an annual herb producing a slender, reddish stem coated in white hairs and measuring 10 to 15 centimeters tall. The leaves are divided into many needlelike lobes. The inflorescence is a head of flowers lined with glandular red bracts. Each flower is about a centimeter long and has a white tubular throat and a five-lobed purple-blue corolla.
