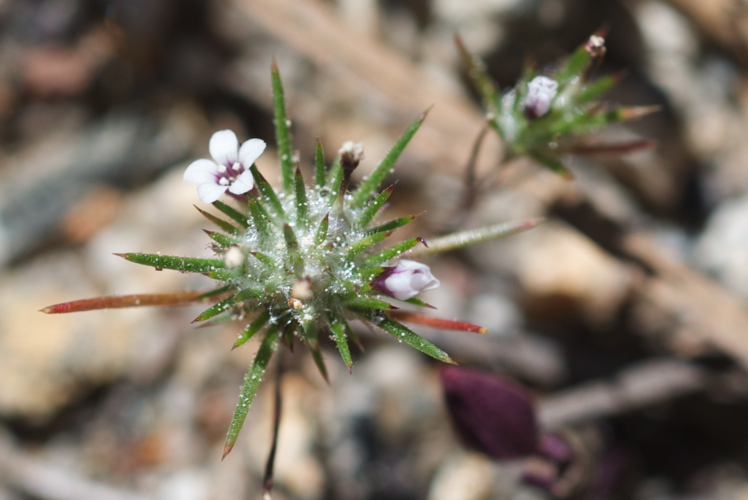

Scientific classification
- Kingdom: Plantae
- Clade: Tracheophytes
- Clade: Angiosperms
- Clade: Eudicots
- Clade: Asterids
- Order: Ericales
- Family: Polemoniaceae
- Genus: Navarretia
- Species: N. divaricata

Binomial name
- Navarretia divaricata (Torr. ex A.Gray) Greene

= Navarretia divaricata =

Species of flowering plant

Navarretia divaricata is a species of flowering plant in the phlox family known by the common name mountain navarretia, or divaricate navarretia. It is native to western North America from British Columbia to Montana to California, where it grows in open habitat types.

It is a hairy, glandular annual herb producing a stem with pairs or whorls of purple-brown branches no more than about 10 centimeters tall. The leaves are divided into threadlike lobes. The inflorescence is a rounded head filled with leaflike green bracts deeply divided into long, narrow, pointed lobes. The small pink-tinged white to dark blue flowers are tucked amidst the spine-lobed bracts.
