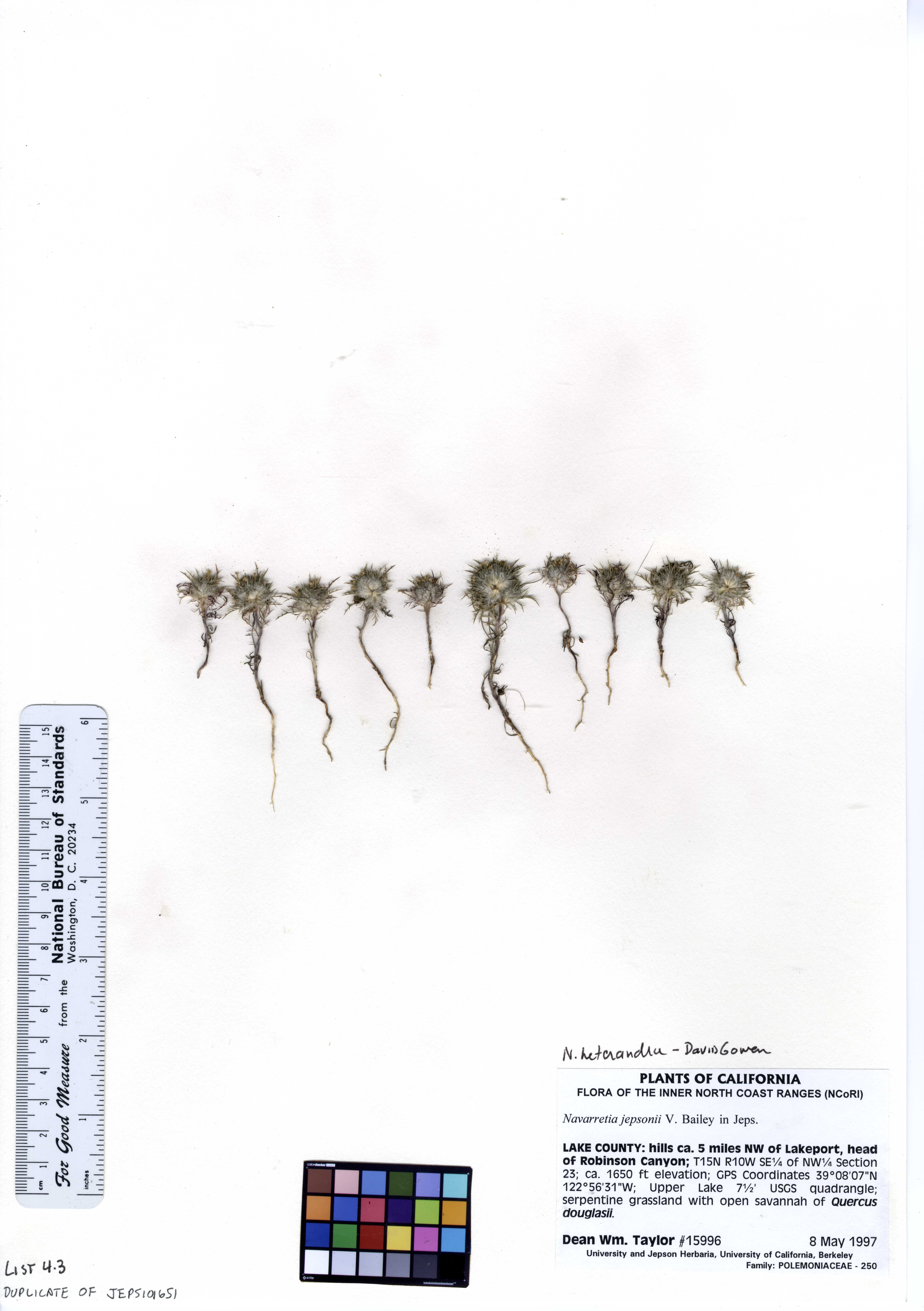

Scientific classification
- Kingdom: Plantae
- Clade: Tracheophytes
- Clade: Angiosperms
- Clade: Eudicots
- Clade: Asterids
- Order: Ericales
- Family: Polemoniaceae
- Genus: Navarretia
- Species: N. heterandra

Binomial name
- Navarretia heterandra H.Mason

= Navarretia heterandra =

Species of flowering plant

Navarretia heterandra is an uncommon species of flowering plant in the phlox family known by the common name Tehama pincushionplant, or Tehama navarretia.

== Distribution ==
It is native to northern California and southern Oregon, where it is found in moist areas on grasslands, such as vernal pools.

== Description ==
Navarretia heterandra is a hairy annual herb producing a thin decumbent stem no more than 11 centimeters long. The leaves are divided into threadlike or needlelike lobes. The inflorescence is a compact, hairy head lined with red-tipped greenish bracts. The flowers are white with purple-spotted tubular throats. They are under a centimeter long and have four or five lobes in their corollas.
