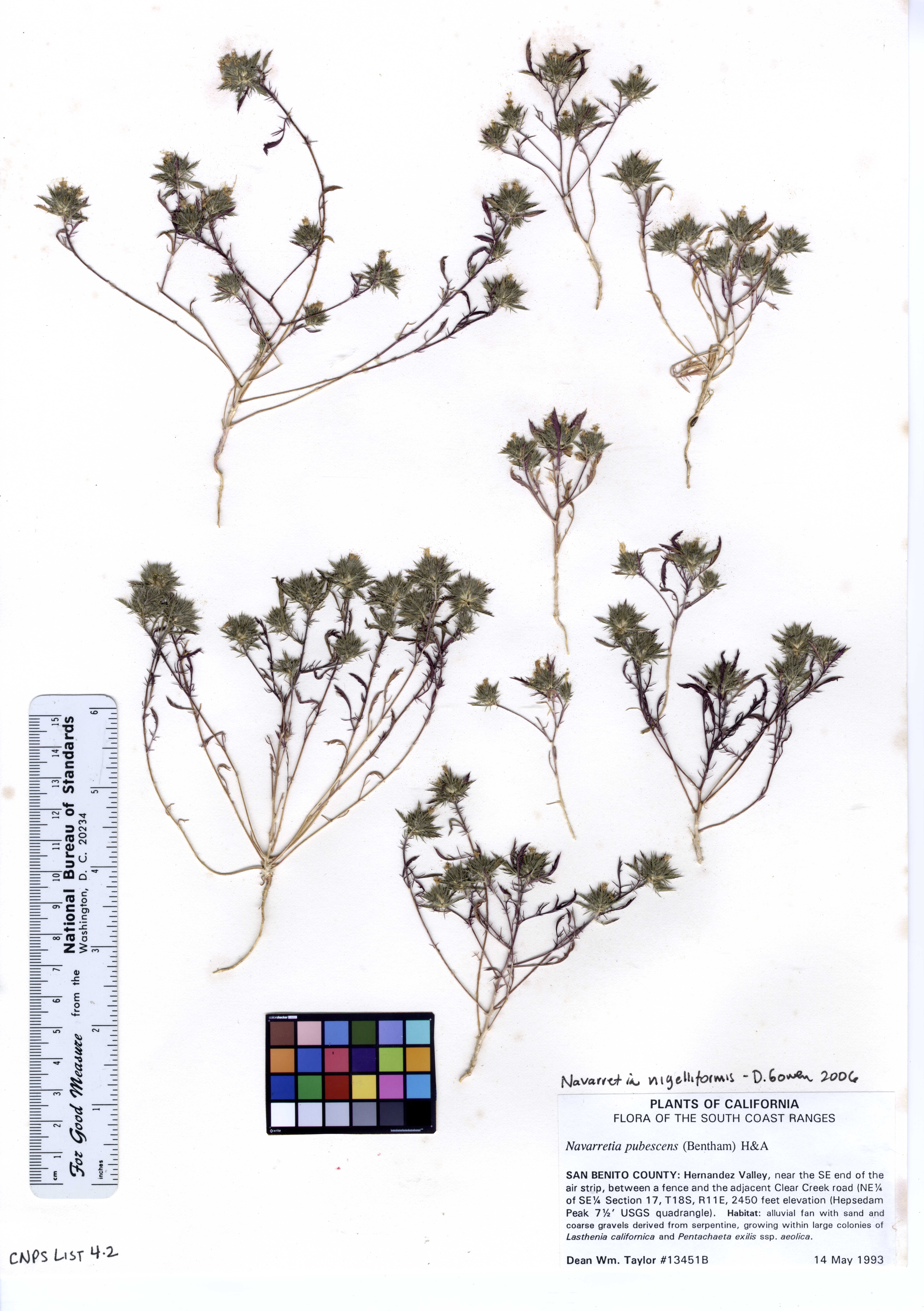

Scientific classification
- Kingdom: Plantae
- Clade: Tracheophytes
- Clade: Angiosperms
- Clade: Eudicots
- Clade: Asterids
- Order: Ericales
- Family: Polemoniaceae
- Genus: Navarretia
- Species: N. nigelliformis

Binomial name
- Navarretia nigelliformis Greene

Subspecies
- Navarretia nigelliformis subsp. nigelliformis; Navarretia nigelliformis subsp. radians

= Navarretia nigelliformis =

Species of flowering plant

Navarretia nigelliformis is a species of flowering plant in the phlox family known by the common name adobe navarretia or the adobe pincushion-plant. It is endemic to California, where it is known from the Central Valley and adjacent mountains. It grows in vernally wet depressions in clay soils, such as vernal pools.

It is a hairy annual herb growing up to about 32 centimeters in maximum height. The leaves are divided into many very narrow linear or needlelike lobes. The inflorescence is a head of flowers lined with leaflike bracts with long white hairs. The flower is yellow with brown or purple spots in the throat.
