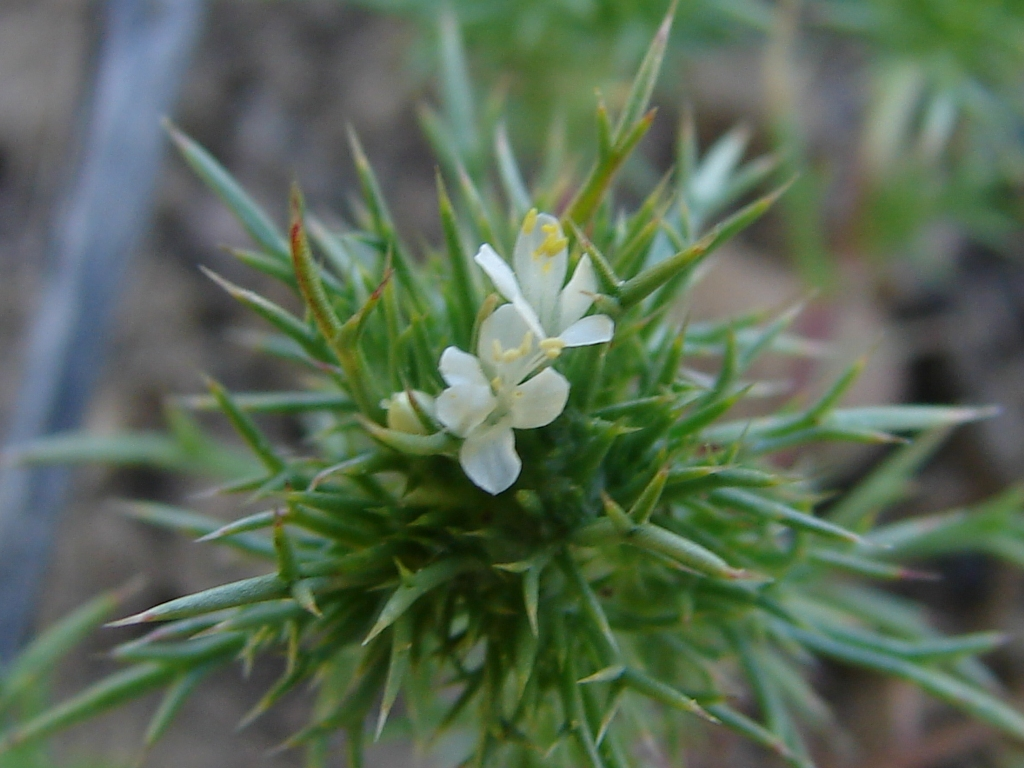

Conservation status
- Secure (NatureServe)

Scientific classification
- Kingdom: Plantae
- Clade: Tracheophytes
- Clade: Angiosperms
- Clade: Eudicots
- Clade: Asterids
- Order: Ericales
- Family: Polemoniaceae
- Genus: Navarretia
- Species: N. intertexta

Binomial name
- Navarretia intertexta (Benth.) Hook.

Subspecies
- N. i. subsp. intertexta; N. i. subsp. propinqua

Synonyms
- Aegochloa intertexta Benth.; Gilia intertexta (Benth.) Steud.; Navarretia minima var. intertexta

= Navarretia intertexta =

Plant species in the phlox family

Navarretia intertexta is a species of flowering plant in the phlox family, known by the common name needleleaf pincushionplant.

It is native to western North America, including most of the western United States and extending into the Midwest. It grows in a variety of habitat types, including moist meadows and vernal pools.

It is a hairy annual herb growing up to about 28 centimeters long, growing erect or spreading wider than tall. The leaves are divided into many needlelike lobes. The inflorescence is a head of flowers lined with leaflike bracts with needle-shaped lobes, and often with a coat of dense hairs. The flowers are white to blue and tubular in shape.

== Taxonomy ==
In 1833 botanist George Bentham described a new genus that he named Aegochloa, but it was later combined with Gilia. At the same time he described a new species which he named Aegochloa intertexta, that was then placed in Navarretia in 1837 by William Jackson Hooker. Together with its genus it is classified in the family Polemoniaceae and the species has two accepted subspecies.

- Navarretia intertexta subsp. intertexta – Native to the westernmost states and provinces
- Navarretia intertexta subsp. propinqua – Widespread from Pacific to the Rocky Mountains

Navarretia intertexta has eight synonyms of the species or its two subspecies.

Table of Synonyms
Name	Year	Rank	Synonym of:	Notes
Aegochloa intertexta Benth.	1833	species	N. intertexta	≡ hom.
Gilia intertexta (Benth.) Steud.	1840	species	N. intertexta	≡ hom.
Gilia propinqua (Suksd.) H.St.John	1963	species	subsp. propinqua	≡ hom.
Navarretia intertexta var. alpina Brand	1907	variety	subsp. intertexta	= het.
Navarretia intertexta var. propinqua (Suksd.) Brand	1907	variety	subsp. propinqua	≡ hom.
Navarretia minima var. intertexta (Benth.) B.Boivin	1966	variety	N. intertexta	≡ hom.
Navarretia propinqua Suksd.	1906	species	subsp. propinqua	≡ hom.
Navarretia stricta Howell	1901	species	subsp. intertexta	= het.
Notes: ≡ homotypic synonym; = heterotypic synonym

== Range ==
The needleleaf pincushionplant is native to western North America from western Canada to northwestern Mexico. In Canada it is recorded in British Columbia and Saskatchewan. In the US it grows in scattered locations in western North Dakota, South Dakota, and Nebraska. In the northwestern US it is also widely scattered in Montana, Wyoming, and Idaho, but becomes more widely reported to the west in Washington and Oregon. Precise locations for the species in Colorado and New Mexico are not recorded, but it is native to both states. Further west it is quite widespread in California and also grows in some areas of Nevada, Utah, and Arizona. Isolated native occurrences are reported for Ohio and Massachusetts, but the population from Wayne County, Tennessee is believed to be introduced. In Mexico it only is found in Baja California.
