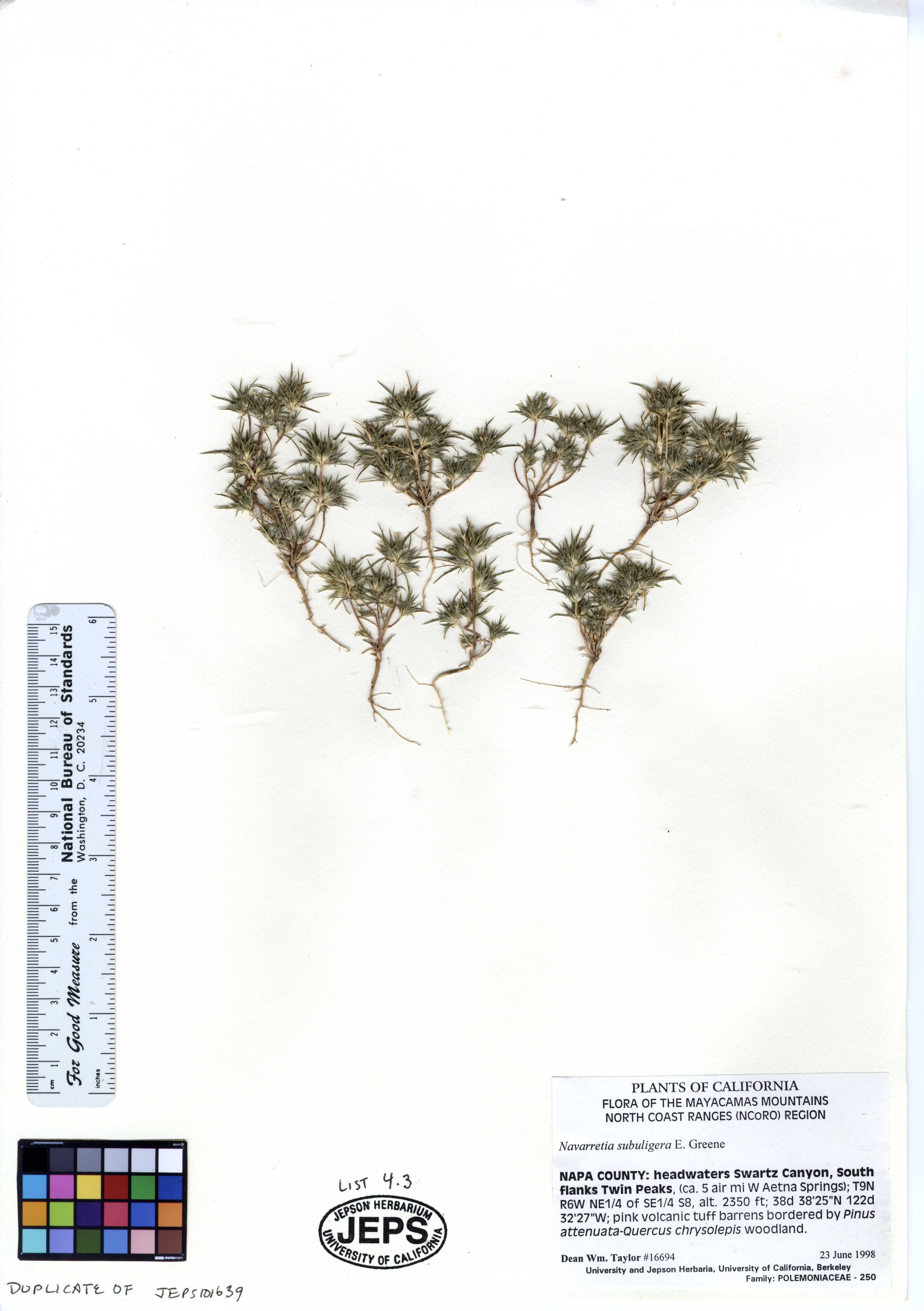

Scientific classification
- Kingdom: Plantae
- Clade: Tracheophytes
- Clade: Angiosperms
- Clade: Eudicots
- Clade: Asterids
- Order: Ericales
- Family: Polemoniaceae
- Genus: Navarretia
- Species: N. subuligera

Binomial name
- Navarretia subuligera Greene

= Navarretia subuligera =

Species of flowering plant

Navarretia subuligera is a species of flowering plant in the phlox family known by the common names awl-leaf pincushionplant or awl-leaved navarretia. It is native to southern Oregon and northern California, where it grows in open, wet habitat, such as meadows and vernal pools. It is a hairy, purple-colored annual herb growing up to about 16 centimeters tall. The leaves are divided into many linear lobes. The inflorescence is a cluster of many flowers surrounded by leaflike bracts with awl-shaped lobes. The flowers are white and under a centimeter in length.
