= Navarretia mellita =

Scientific classification
- Kingdom: Plantae
- Clade: Tracheophytes
- Clade: Angiosperms
- Clade: Eudicots
- Clade: Asterids
- Order: Ericales
- Family: Polemoniaceae
- Genus: Navarretia
- Species: N. mellita

Binomial name
- Navarretia mellita Greene

Species of flowering plant

Navarretia mellita is a species of flowering plant in the phlox family known by the common name honeyscented pincushionplant.

It is endemic to California, where it is known only from several coastal and inland mountains and foothills in the central region of the state. It generally grows in moist spots in chaparral and other habitat.

It is a hairy, glandular annual herb growing 10 to 20 centimeters tall. The leaves are divided into many narrow linear lobes. The inflorescence is a head of flowers lined with leaflike bracts. Each flower is about half a centimeter long and tubular in shape with a white throat and a blue lobed face.
