= Navarretia tagetina =

Scientific classification
- Kingdom: Plantae
- Clade: Tracheophytes
- Clade: Angiosperms
- Clade: Eudicots
- Clade: Asterids
- Order: Ericales
- Family: Polemoniaceae
- Genus: Navarretia
- Species: N. tagetina

Binomial name
- Navarretia tagetina Greene

Species of flowering plant

Navarretia tagetina is a species of flowering plant in the phlox family known by the common names marigold pincushionplant and marigold navarretia. It is native to the western United States from Washington to central California, where it grows in wet grassland habitat such as vernal pools. It is a somewhat hairy annual herb growing up to about 30 centimeters tall. The leaves are deeply divided into many spreading needlelike lobes. The inflorescence is a cluster of many flowers surrounded by leaflike bracts. The flowers are pale blue and about a centimeter long.
