= Sorrento Mesa, San Diego =

Coordinates: 32°53′21″N 117°10′41″W

Sorrento Mesa is a neighborhood in northwestern San Diego, California. It lies on a mesa with many ridges, north of Carrol Canyon Road, east of Interstate 805, west of Camino Santa Fe, and south of a canyon locally known as Lopez Canyon. The San Diego Police Department's neighborhood map shows Sorrento Mesa as part of the Sorrento Valley neighborhood. Sorrento Mesa is included in the Mira Mesa Community Planning Area.

== Economy ==
The large office, retail, entertainment and academic facilities in University City, also known as UTC (with over 9 million sq. ft. or 840,000 m^{2} of office space), Sorrento Mesa/Sorrento Valley (also over 9 million sq. ft.), Torrey Pines (over 2.6 million sq. ft. or 240,000 m^{2}), and Del Mar Heights/Carmel Valley (over 4.4 million sq. ft. Or 410,000 m^{2}), together form San Diego's "North City edge city" as it is a major center of employment outside of downtown San Diego.

The area is primarily zoned for light industrial use. At its center is the San Diego Tech Center. There is a particular concentration of businesses in the fields of telecommunications, wireless applications, and biotechnology research. There are also hotels, restaurants, and small retail areas which cater primarily to employees and visitors of the businesses.

Major businesses operating in Sorrento Mesa include Qualcomm, Dexcom, Texas Instruments, Fujitsu, T-Mobile, Novatel Wireless, NuVasive, and the Active Network. In 2011 the Federal Bureau of Investigation announced plans to move into a $100 million, six-story building on Vista Sorrento Parkway in Sorrento Mesa. The building houses 400 special agents and support staff; the FBI occupied the building in May 2013.

== History ==
Prior to European contact, the Kumeyaay village of Ystagua (istawa in Kumeyaay) sat at the foot of the mesa in Sorrento Valley, which was a major tool manufacturing, food processing, and trade hub in the region which had a population of about 200.

Development of the area began in the 1980s with a series of industrial parks. Support services such as restaurants and shopping began to be added later in the decade.

== Community groups ==
The Business Alliance of Sorrento Mesa is a sub-group of the San Diego Chamber of Commerce.
