= Navarretia viscidula =

Scientific classification
- Kingdom: Plantae
- Clade: Tracheophytes
- Clade: Angiosperms
- Clade: Eudicots
- Clade: Asterids
- Order: Ericales
- Family: Polemoniaceae
- Genus: Navarretia
- Species: N. viscidula

Binomial name
- Navarretia viscidula Benth.

Species of flowering plant

Navarretia viscidula is a species of flowering plant in the phlox family known by the common name sticky pincushionplant.

It is endemic to California, where it can be found in the Sierra Nevada foothills and the Coast Ranges in and around the San Francisco Bay Area. It grows in moist and wet spots in mountain and hillside habitat, such as vernal pools and spring meadows.

== Description ==
Navarretia viscidula is a hairy, glandular annual herb producing a spreading, branching stem up to about 24 centimeters tall. The leaves are strap-shaped or divided into narrow, flat or needlelike lobes.

The inflorescence is a cluster of many flowers surrounded by leaflike bracts. The flowers are reddish-purple to purple and 1 to 1.5 centimeters in length.
