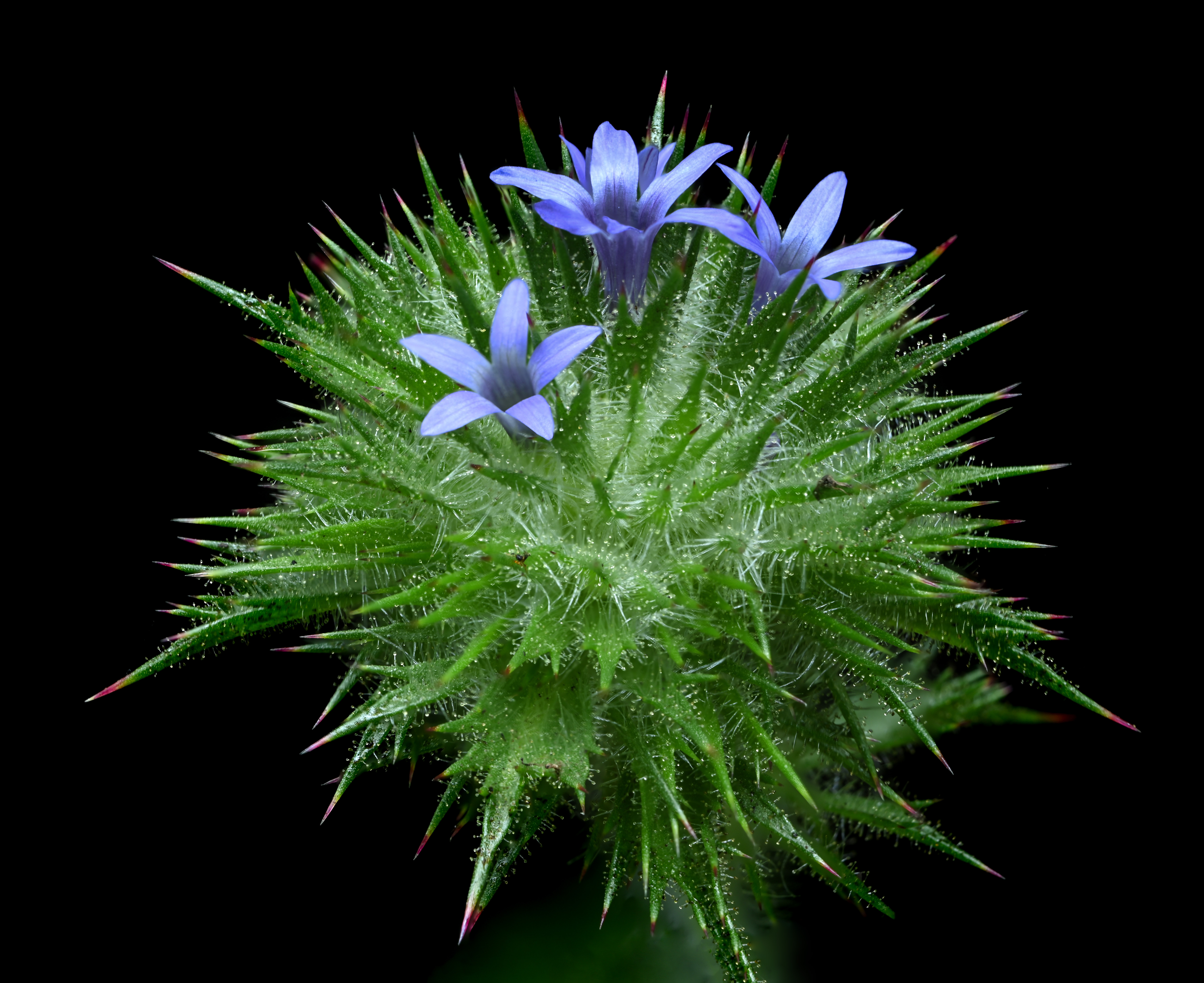

Scientific classification
- Kingdom: Plantae
- Clade: Tracheophytes
- Clade: Angiosperms
- Clade: Eudicots
- Clade: Asterids
- Order: Ericales
- Family: Polemoniaceae
- Genus: Navarretia
- Species: N. squarrosa

Binomial name
- Navarretia squarrosa (Eschsch.) Hook. & Arn.

Synonyms
- Gilia squarrosa (Eschsch.) Hook. & Arn. Hoitzia squarrosa Eschsch.

= Navarretia squarrosa =

Species of flowering plant

Navarretia squarrosa (skunkbush, skunkweed, or California stinkweed) is a spreading annual plant from North America which is noted for its skunk-like odour. It grows to between 10 and 60 cm in height and has tubular lilac pink to deep blue flowers up to 12 mm in diameter in dense terminal heads, encircled by spiny sepals and bracts. The leaves are pinnately lobed and spiny.

== Occurrence ==
The species is native to British Columbia, Washington, Oregon, and California, and is naturalised elsewhere, including Australia and New Zealand. It is commonly found at elevations of less than 800 metres on open, wet, gravelly flats and slopes.

Specific plant associations where N. squarrosa occurs include the specialized Monterey Cypress forests near Carmel, California.
