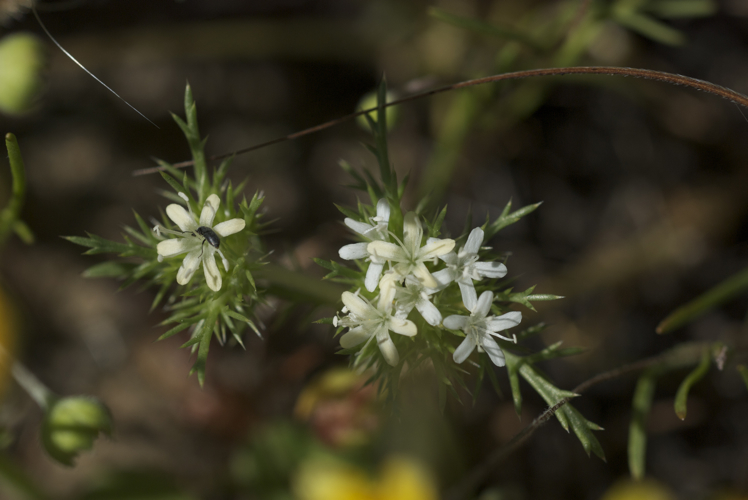
- subsp. bakeri

Scientific classification
- Kingdom: Plantae
- Clade: Tracheophytes
- Clade: Angiosperms
- Clade: Eudicots
- Clade: Asterids
- Order: Ericales
- Family: Polemoniaceae
- Genus: Navarretia
- Species: N. leucocephala

Binomial name
- Navarretia leucocephala Benth.

Synonyms
- Navarretia bakeri Navarretia minima Navarretia pauciflora Navarretia plieantha

= Navarretia leucocephala =

Species of flowering plant

Navarretia leucocephala is a species of flowering plant in the phlox family known by the common name whitehead pincushionplant, or whitehead navarretia. It is native to North America, including much of the western United States and central Canada. It generally grows in wet or moist terrestrial habitat such as vernal pools.

It is an annual herb producing a slender, hairy stem. The plant's appearance is variable, and there are several subspecies that differ slightly. The appearance of the plant also depends on the amount of water available in its habitat. The leaves are divided into many needlelike lobes. The inflorescence is a head of flowers lined with leaflike bracts. Each tubular flower is up to a centimeter long. The flowers vary in color from white to blue. Two rare California subspecies are federally listed as endangered species in the United States.

Subspecies:

- N. l. ssp. bakeri (Baker's navarretia) - an uncommon subspecies limited-endemic to California north of the Bay Area
- N. l. ssp. leucocephala - can be found in central California and Oregon
- N. l. ssp. minima (least navarretia) - the most widespread subspecies
- N. l. ssp. pauciflora (few-flowered navarretia) - endangered plant known from about 10 occurrences endemic to California north of the Bay Area
- N. l. ssp. plieantha (many-flowered navarretia) - endangered plant known from about 10 occurrences endemic to the same range as ssp. pauciflora
