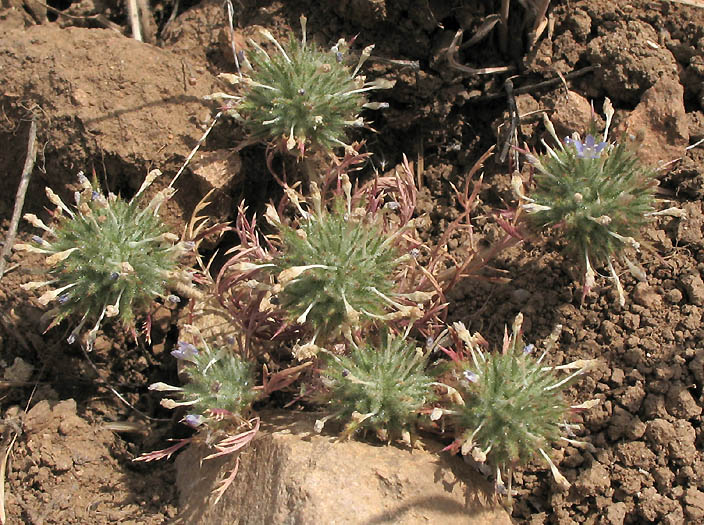

Scientific classification
- Kingdom: Plantae
- Clade: Tracheophytes
- Clade: Angiosperms
- Clade: Eudicots
- Clade: Asterids
- Order: Ericales
- Family: Polemoniaceae
- Genus: Navarretia
- Species: N. pubescens

Binomial name
- Navarretia pubescens (Benth.) Hook. & Arn.

Synonyms
- Navarretia mitracarpa

= Navarretia pubescens =

Species of flowering plant

Navarretia pubescens is a species of flowering plant belonging to the phlox family known by the common name downy pincushionplant.

It is native to the central mountain ranges and Central Valley of California, and to southern Oregon. It can be found in chaparral and oak woodlands habitats.

== Description ==
Navarretia pubescens is a hairy, glandular annual herb producing a reddish or brownish stem up to about 33 centimeters in maximum length. The leaves are divided into many linear or needlelike lobes, sometimes clustered. The upper leaves are hairy, the lower generally hairless.

The inflorescence is a cluster of many flowers surrounded by leaflike bracts and coated with downy or glandular hairs. Each flower is just over a centimeter long and blue in color with a purplish throat.
