= Navarretia filicaulis =

Scientific classification
- Kingdom: Plantae
- Clade: Tracheophytes
- Clade: Angiosperms
- Clade: Eudicots
- Clade: Asterids
- Order: Ericales
- Family: Polemoniaceae
- Genus: Navarretia
- Species: N. filicaulis

Binomial name
- Navarretia filicaulis (Torr. ex A.Gray) Greene

Species of flowering plant

Navarretia filicaulis is a species of flowering plant in the phlox family known by the common name threadstem pincushionplant.

It is endemic to California, where it is known only from the foothills of the northern Sierra Nevada and far southern Cascade Range. It grows in chaparral, woodland, and other local habitat.

It is a hairy, glandular annual herb producing a crooked, slender, branching stem up to about 18 centimeters tall. The leaves are up to 3 centimeters long and divided into threadlike lobes. The inflorescence is a head filled with palmate green bracts speckled with resin glands. The tubular purple flowers are under a centimeter long.
