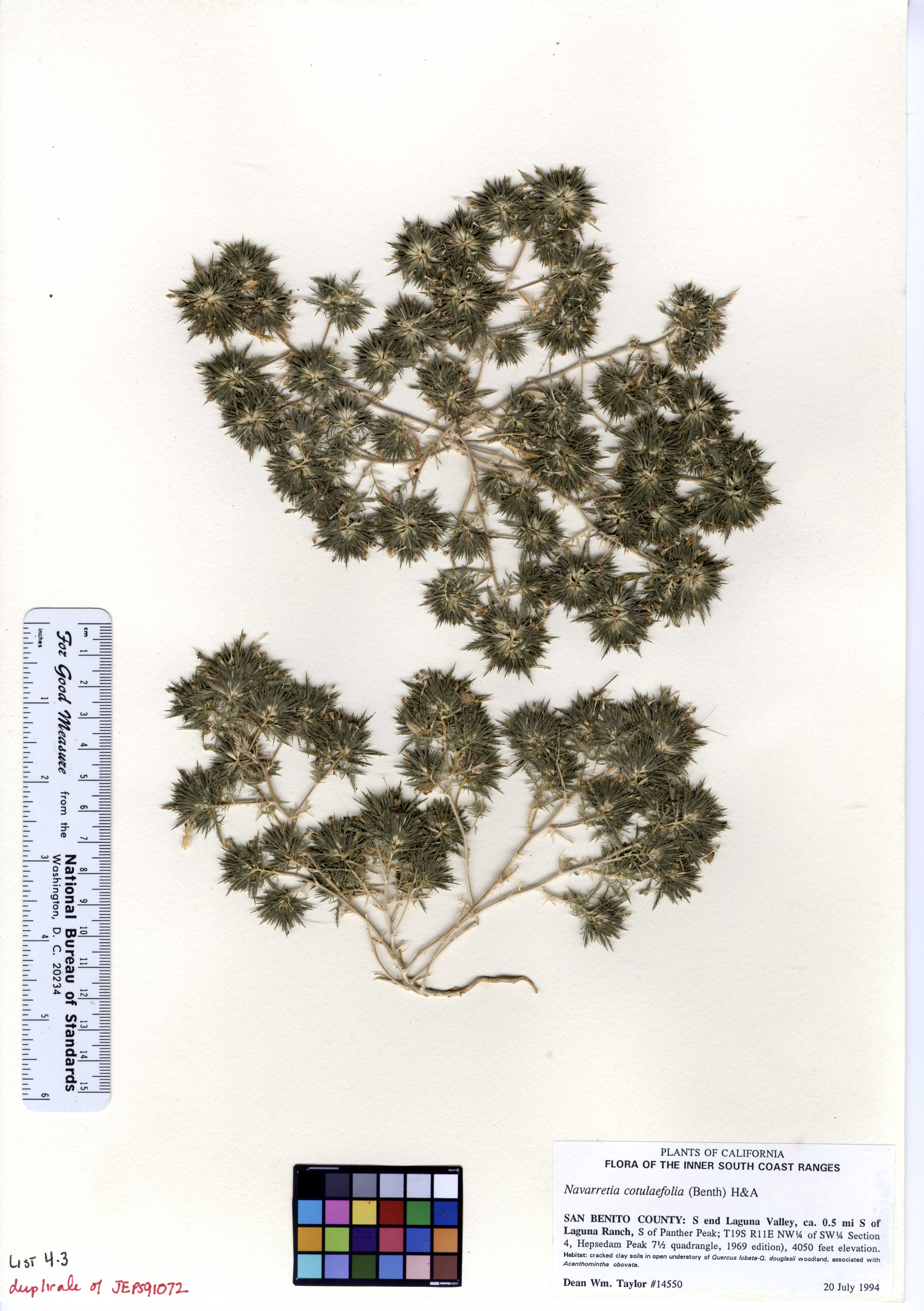

Scientific classification
- Kingdom: Plantae
- Clade: Tracheophytes
- Clade: Angiosperms
- Clade: Eudicots
- Clade: Asterids
- Order: Ericales
- Family: Polemoniaceae
- Genus: Navarretia
- Species: N. cotulifolia

Binomial name
- Navarretia cotulifolia (Benth.) Hook. & Arn.

= Navarretia cotulifolia =

Species of flowering plant

Navarretia cotulifolia is a species of flowering plant in the phlox family known by the common name cotulaleaf pincushionplant, or cotula navarretia.

It is endemic to northern California, where it grows in the Sacramento Valley and the Coast Ranges in and around the San Francisco Bay Area.

It grows in moist areas in chaparral and grassland habitat, such as vernal pools, in heavy soils such as adobe clay.

== Description ==
Navarretia cotulifolia is a hairy, glandular annual herb producing a branching red or green stem up to about 30 centimeters tall. The leaves are divided into clusters of tiny needlelike lobes that point toward the tip of the leaf.

The inflorescence is a rounded head filled with leaflike green bracts deeply divided into narrow, pointed lobes. The flowers are a centimeter long and tubular, with thread-thin throats and four cream or very pale yellow lobes.
