= Torrey Pines, San Diego =

Neighborhood in San Diego, California

Coordinates: 32°53′30.17″N 117°14′25.09″W

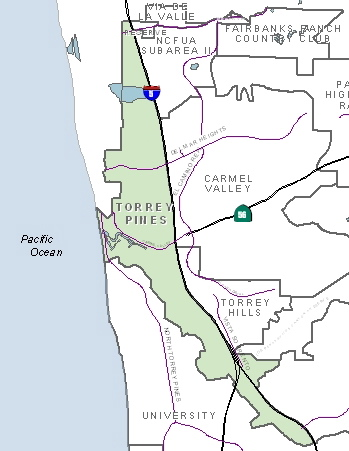
Torrey Pines community boundaries and surrounding communities

Torrey Pines is a community neighborhood of 2,600 acres (1,100 ha) in the northern coastal area of San Diego, California, United States, with large areas of office space along Interstate 5.

The large office, retail, entertainment and academic facilities in University City (over 9 million sq. ft. of office space), Sorrento Mesa/Sorrento Valley (also over 9 million sq. ft.), Torrey Pines (over 2.6 million sq. ft.), and Del Mar Heights/Carmel Valley (over 4.4 million sq. ft.), together form San Diego's "North City", an edge city being a major center of employment outside a traditional downtown.

The area is also home to Torrey Pines Golf Course, one of the highest-ranked municipal golf courses in the country. The course and the City of San Diego hosted the 2008 US Open and the 2021 US Open. In addition, The Sentry, a PGA Tour tournament, is played at Torrey Pines annually.

== Geography ==
Torrey Pines is bordered to the north by the city of Del Mar, to the south by La Jolla, to the east by Interstate 5, Carmel Valley, Torrey Hills, the Los Peñasquitos Canyon Reserve, and Mira Mesa; and to the west by La Jolla and the Pacific Ocean for a short distance near Torrey Pines State Beach and Torrey Pines State Park.

42 percent of the community is parks and open spaces, 24 percent is residential, 17 percent is transportation, 15 percent is industrial, 1 percent is schools, and 1 percent is commercial.

Del Mar Terraces and the Del Mar Heights are neighborhoods within this community.

== Demographics ==
According to January 2013 estimates by the San Diego Association of Governments, there were 6,652 people and 2,889 households residing in the neighborhood. The estimated racial makeup was 81.5% White, 8.6% Asian & Pacific Islander, 5.7% Hispanic, 3.4% other races, 0.8% African American, and 0.1% American Indian. The median age was 46.6 with 20.4% under the age of 18 (64% White, 12% Asian/P.I., 11% each Hispanic and other races, 3% African American) and 21.7% age 65 and older (96% White, 3% Asian/P.I., less than 1% all other races). The estimated median household income was $176,362 ($168,471 adjusted for inflation in 2010 dollars); 54% of the community made more than $150,000; 24% made between $60,000 and $149,999; and 23% made less than $60,000.

== Education ==
The Del Mar Union School District serves two elementary schools in Del Mar Heights neighborhood, Del Mar Hills Academy and Del Mar Heights Elementary.
