= Navarretia peninsularis =

Scientific classification
- Kingdom: Plantae
- Clade: Tracheophytes
- Clade: Angiosperms
- Clade: Eudicots
- Clade: Asterids
- Order: Ericales
- Family: Polemoniaceae
- Genus: Navarretia
- Species: N. peninsularis

Binomial name
- Navarretia peninsularis Greene

Species of flowering plant

Navarretia peninsularis is an uncommon species of flowering plant in the phlox family known by the common name Baja navarretia or Baja pincushionplant. It is native to southern California and Baja California, where it is an occasional member of the flora in wet spots in mountain forests. It is a hairy, glandular annual herb growing up to about 25 centimeters in maximum height. The leaves are 1 to 3 centimeters long and divided into many narrow linear or needlelike lobes. The inflorescence is a head of flowers lined with leaflike bracts. The lavender flowers are just under a centimeter long.
