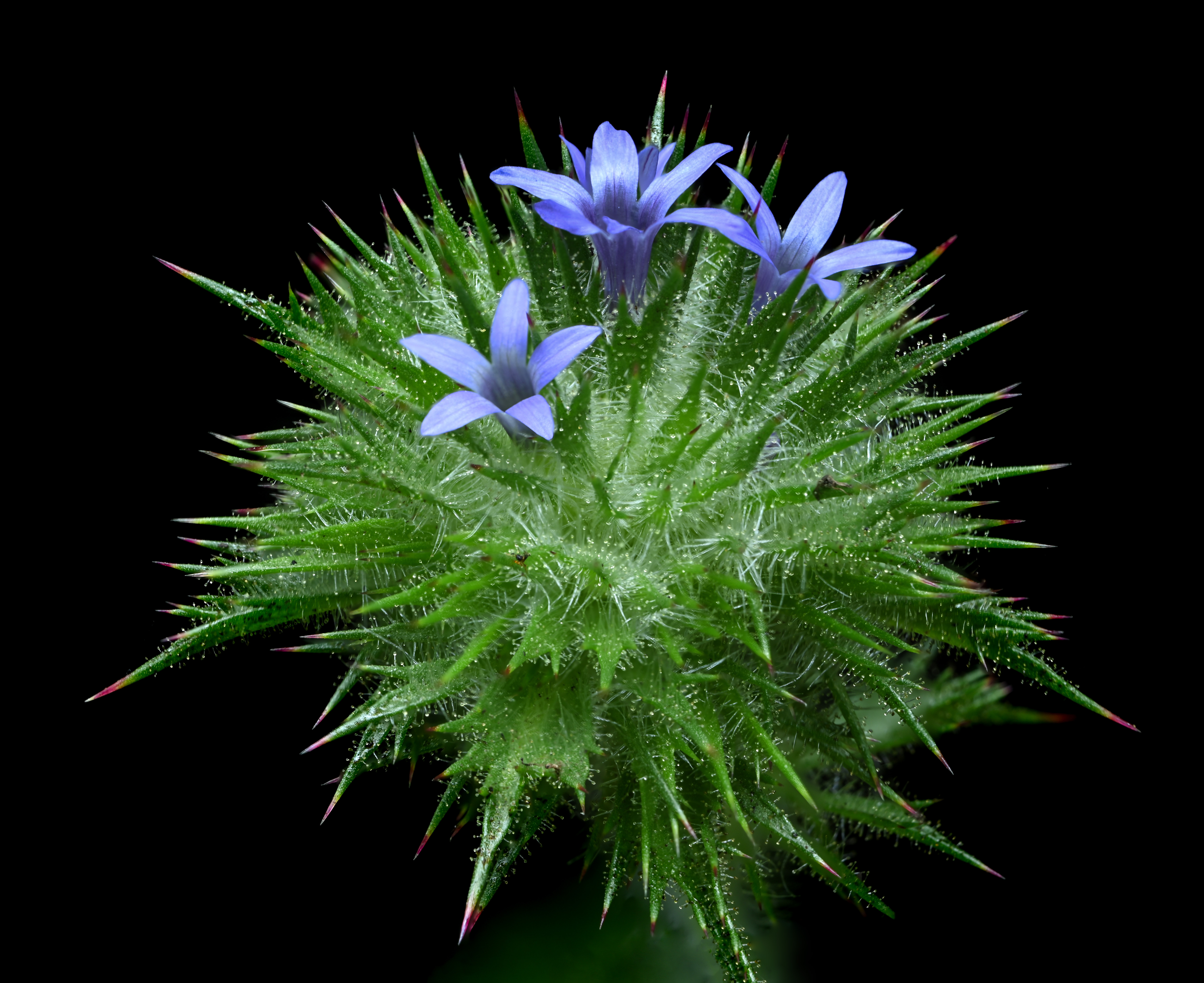
- Navarretia squarrosa

Scientific classification
- Kingdom: Plantae
- Clade: Tracheophytes
- Clade: Angiosperms
- Clade: Eudicots
- Clade: Asterids
- Order: Ericales
- Family: Polemoniaceae
- Genus: Navarretia; Ruiz & Pav.

Species
- 45; see text

= Navarretia =

Genus of flowering plants

Navarretia is a genus of flowering plants related to the phloxes and the gilias. This is one genus of plants, among others, which are sometimes called pincushion plants. It includes 45 species native to the Americas. In North America they range from western Canada through the western and west-central United States to northwestern Mexico, and to Ohio and Pennsylvania. In South America they range through Argentina and Chile.

The inflorescence which bears the flowers is surrounded by frilly green bracts bearing soft spines, giving it the appearance of a pincushion. Several species are members of the vernal pool ecosystem.

== Species ==
45 species are accepted.

- Navarretia aeroides L.A.Johnson & D.Gowen
- Navarretia atractyloides (Benth.) Hook. & Arn. - hollyleaf pincushionplant
- Navarretia breweri (A.Gray) Greene - Brewer's pincushionplant
- Navarretia capillaris (Kellogg) Kuntze - miniature gilia
- Navarretia cotulifolia (Benth.) Hook. & Arn. - cotulaleaf pincushionplant
- Navarretia crystallina L.A.Johnson & D.Gowen
- Navarretia divaricata Greene - divaricate navarretia
- Navarretia eriocephala H.Mason - hoary pincushionplant
- Navarretia filicaulis (Torr. ex A.Gray) Greene - threadstem pincushionplant
- Navarretia fossalis Moran - vernal pool pincushionplant
- Navarretia gowenii L.A.Johnson
- Navarretia hamata Greene - hooked pincushionplant
- Navarretia × helleri Brand
- Navarretia heterandra H.Mason - Tehama pincushionplant
- Navarretia heterodoxa (Greene) Greene - Calistoga pincushionplant
- Navarretia intertexta (Benth.) Hook. - needleleaf pincushionplant
- Navarretia involucrata Ruiz & Pav.
- Navarretia jaredii Eastw. - mitrefruit pincushionplant
- Navarretia jepsonii V.L.Bailey - Jepson's pincushionplant
- Navarretia leptalea (A.Gray) L.A.Johnson - Bridges' pincushionplant
- Navarretia leucocephala Benth. - whitehead pincushionplant, many-flowered pincushionplant
- Navarretia linearifolia (Howell) L.A.Johnson
- Navarretia mellita (Greene) Greene - honey-scented pincushionplant
- Navarretia minima Nutt.
- Navarretia miwukensis D.Gowen & L.A.Johnson
- Navarretia modocensis L.A.Johnson & D.Gowen
- Navarretia myersii P.S.Allen & A.G.Day
- Navarretia nigelliformis Greene - adobe pincushionplant
- Navarretia ojaiensis Elvin, J.M.Porter & L.A.Johnson - Ojai navarretia
- Navarretia panochensis D.Gowen & L.A.Johnson
- Navarretia paradoxiclara L.A.Johnson & D.Gowen
- Navarretia paradoxinota L.A.Johnson & D.Gowen
- Navarretia peninsularis Greene - Baja pincushionplant
- Navarretia prolifera Greene - bur pincushionplant
- Navarretia prostrata (A.Gray) Greene - prostrate pincushionplant
- Navarretia pubescens (Benth.) Hook. & Arn. - downy pincushionplant
- Navarretia rosulata Brand - San Anselmo pincushionplant
- Navarretia saximontana S.C.Spencer
- Navarretia setiloba Coville - Piute Mountain pincushionplant
- Navarretia sinistra (M.E.Jones) L.A.Johnson - Alva Day's pincushionplant
- Navarretia squarrosa (Eschsch.) Hook. & Arn. - skunkbush
- Navarretia subuligera Greene - awl-leaf pincushionplant
- Navarretia tagetina Greene - marigold pincushionplant
- Navarretia torreyella L.A.Johnson & D.Gowen
- Navarretia viscidula Benth. - sticky pincushionplant
- Navarretia vividior (Jeps. & V.L.Bailey) L.A.Johnson & D.Gowen
