= Navarretia ojaiensis =

Conservation status
- Imperiled (NatureServe)

Scientific classification
- Kingdom: Plantae
- Clade: Tracheophytes
- Clade: Angiosperms
- Clade: Eudicots
- Clade: Asterids
- Order: Ericales
- Family: Polemoniaceae
- Genus: Navarretia
- Species: N. ojaiensis

Binomial name
- Navarretia ojaiensis Elvin, J.M.Porter & L.A.Johnson

Species of flowering plant

Navarretia ojaiensis is a rare species of flowering plant in the phlox family known by the common name Ojai navarretia.

== Distribution ==
The plant is endemic to Southern California. It occurs in Ventura County, California, where it is known from the Ojai Valley, the Santa Clarita Valley, and the Santa Susana Mountains. It also occurs in the Santa Monica Mountains within Los Angeles County.

It is found in open areas of chaparral, coastal sage scrub, and grassland habitats. It grows at elevations of 275–620 metres (902–2,034 ft).

=== Endangered species ===
Navarretia ojaiensis plant is a Critically endangered species on the California Native Plant Society Inventory of Rare and Endangered Plants.

Many of the known occurrences may no longer exist, because they are in areas that have experienced urban development. All but one of the remaining populations are in locations which are likely to be developed or altered.

Two populations known in the Santa Monica Mountains may have been extirpated. One was on land that was converted to a parking lot at the home of the composer Marco Beltrami. Another population was on a slope in Agoura Hills, which was slated to be cleared for the construction of the new headquarters for the Conrad N. Hilton Foundation.

== Description ==
Navarretia ojaiensis is an annual herb with a spreading, upright stem growing up to 33 centimetres (13 in) long. The hairy, glandular leaves have blades divided into narrow, pointed lobes lined with tiny teeth.

The inflorescence has narrow, pointed bracts and sepals around the flowers which are densely coated in shiny hairs and resin glands. The tubular flower corolla is roughly a centimeter long and white in color with purple markings in the throat. The five corolla lobes are pointed and the stamens protrude from within the throat. The bloom period is May to July.

This plant is new to science, having been officially described in 2007, accompanied by an updated key to the genus.

== Taxonomy ==
Navarretia ojaiensis was scientifically described and named in 2007 by Mark A. Elvin, James Mark Porter, and Leigh Alma Johnson. The species is classified in the Navarretia genus within the Polemoniaceae family. It is listed as an accepted species in Plants of the World Online. It has no synonyms.

== See also ==
- Endemic flora of California
- Natural history of the California chaparral and woodlands
