= Navarretia prolifera =

Scientific classification
- Kingdom: Plantae
- Clade: Tracheophytes
- Clade: Angiosperms
- Clade: Eudicots
- Clade: Asterids
- Order: Ericales
- Family: Polemoniaceae
- Genus: Navarretia
- Species: N. prolifera

Binomial name
- Navarretia prolifera Greene

Species of flowering plant

Navarretia prolifera is a species of flowering plant in the phlox family known by the common names bur pincushionplant and yellow bur navarretia. It is endemic to the Sierra Nevada foothills of California, where it grows near running water.

== Description ==
Navarretia prolifera is an annual herb with branching or whorled spreading stems up to about 16 centimetres in height. The leaves are threadlike or divided into threadlike lobes. The inflorescence is a cluster of flowers surrounded by hairy leaflike bracts divided into pointed, needlelike lobes. The flower is about a centimeter long. There are two subspecies of the plant, ssp. lutea bearing yellow flowers and ssp. prolifera with yellow-throated purple flowers. The less common ssp. lutea is known only from El Dorado County, California.
