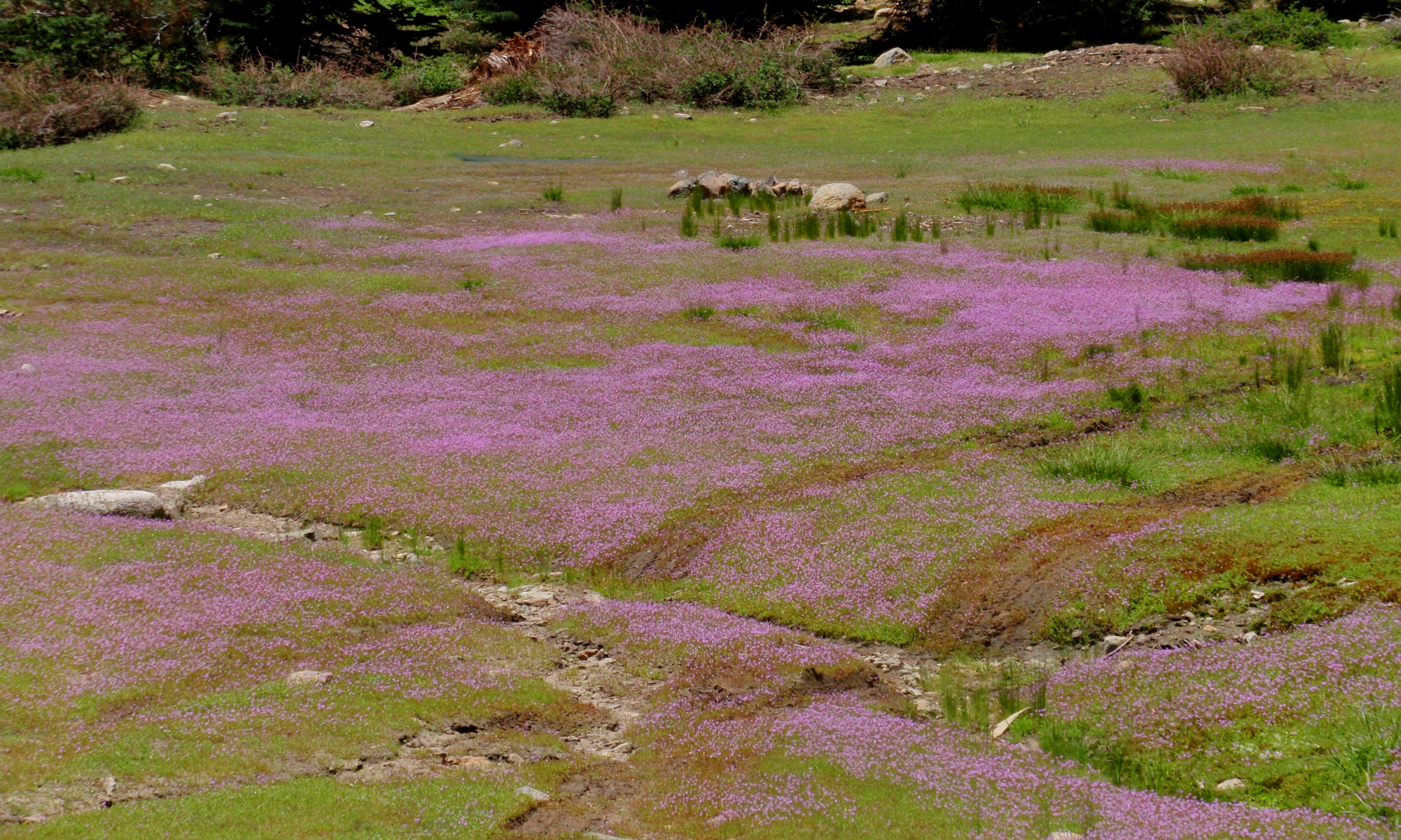
- Carpet of N. leptalea in Madera County, California

Scientific classification
- Kingdom: Plantae
- Clade: Tracheophytes
- Clade: Angiosperms
- Clade: Eudicots
- Clade: Asterids
- Order: Ericales
- Family: Polemoniaceae
- Genus: Navarretia
- Species: N. leptalea

Binomial name
- Navarretia leptalea (A.Gray) L.A.Johnson

Synonyms
- Gilia leptalea

= Navarretia leptalea =

Species of flowering plant

Navarretia leptalea (formerly Gilia leptalea) is a species of flowering plant in the phlox family known by the common name Bridges' pincushionplant.

It is native to the Sierra Nevada and southern Cascade Range in California and Oregon, where it grows in colorful carpets in mountain meadows. It produces glandular stems with linear or narrowly oval-shaped leaves. The tiny stem is topped with an inflorescence of one or more funnel-shaped pink flowers with long, narrow throats.
