= Navarretia setiloba =

Conservation status
- Imperiled (NatureServe)

Scientific classification
- Kingdom: Plantae
- Clade: Tracheophytes
- Clade: Angiosperms
- Clade: Eudicots
- Clade: Asterids
- Order: Ericales
- Family: Polemoniaceae
- Genus: Navarretia
- Species: N. setiloba

Binomial name
- Navarretia setiloba Coville

Species of flowering plant

Navarretia setiloba is a rare species of flowering plant in the phlox family known by the common names Paiute Mountain pincushionplant and Piute Mountains navarretia.

== Distribution ==
The plant is endemic to California, where it is known from fewer than ten occurrences at the southern tip of the Sierra Nevada, Tehachapi Mountains, San Emigdio Mountains, and adjacent southern San Joaquin Valley, primarily within Kern County, California.

It is named for Piute Mountain in the Southern Sierra near Lake Isabella, not the Piute Mountains of the Mojave Desert, which are far outside its range. It is a California Native Plant Society listed critically endangered species.

It grows in moist depressions in grassland, oak woodland, and pinyon-juniper woodland habitats, from 500–2,100 metres (1,600–6,900 ft) in elevation.

== Description ==
Navarretia setiloba is a hairy, glandular annual herb growing 10–20 centimetres (3.9–7.9 in) tall. The leaves are divided into many forked linear lobes.

The inflorescence is a cluster of flowers surrounded by leaflike bracts. The flowers are about a centimeter long and are purple-blue with white throats. The bloom period is April to July.
