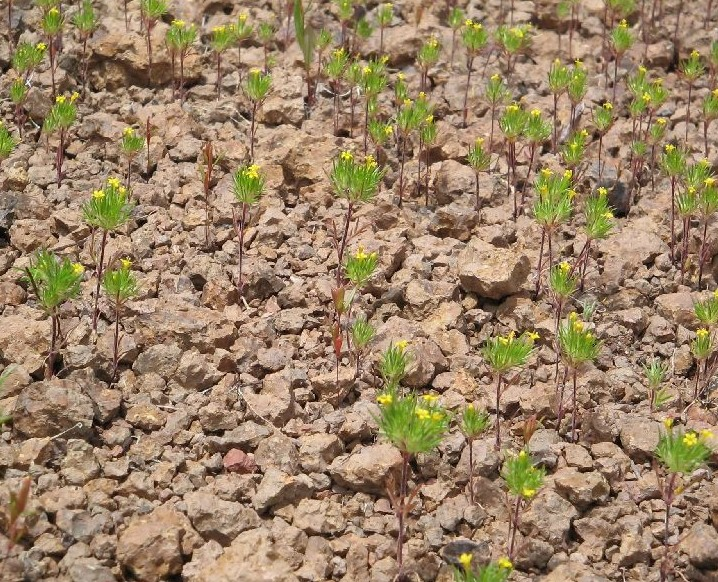

Conservation status
- Apparently Secure (NatureServe)

Scientific classification
- Kingdom: Plantae
- Clade: Embryophytes
- Clade: Tracheophytes
- Clade: Spermatophytes
- Clade: Angiosperms
- Clade: Eudicots
- Clade: Asterids
- Order: Ericales
- Family: Polemoniaceae
- Genus: Navarretia
- Species: N. breweri

Binomial name
- Navarretia breweri (A.Gray) Greene

Synonyms
- Gilia breweri

= Navarretia breweri =

Plant species in the phlox family

Navarretia breweri is a species of flowering plant in the phlox family known by the common name yellow navarretia. It is native to much of the western United States, where it grows in open habitat types.

It is a hairy, glandular annual herb producing an erect, branching brown or reddish stem up to 8 centimeters tall and wide. The small gray-green leaves have tiny needlelike lobes. The inflorescence is a rounded head filled with leaflike green bracts edged with pointed lobes. The flowers tucked amidst the bracts are yellow in color and under a centimeter long. The corolla is divided into five rounded lobes each about a millimeter long.

== Taxonomy ==
The first scientific description of Navarretia breweri was by Asa Gray in 1870 as a species in the Gilia genus. It was moved to Navarretia in 1887 by Edward Lee Greene. Together with its genus it is classified in the Polemoniaceae family and has no subspecies.

== Range ==
Yellow navarretia is native to the western United States from eastern Washington and California to western Colorado and Wyoming. It is also found in northern Arizona, many parts of Utah, most Nevada counties, southern Idaho, and eastern Oregon.
