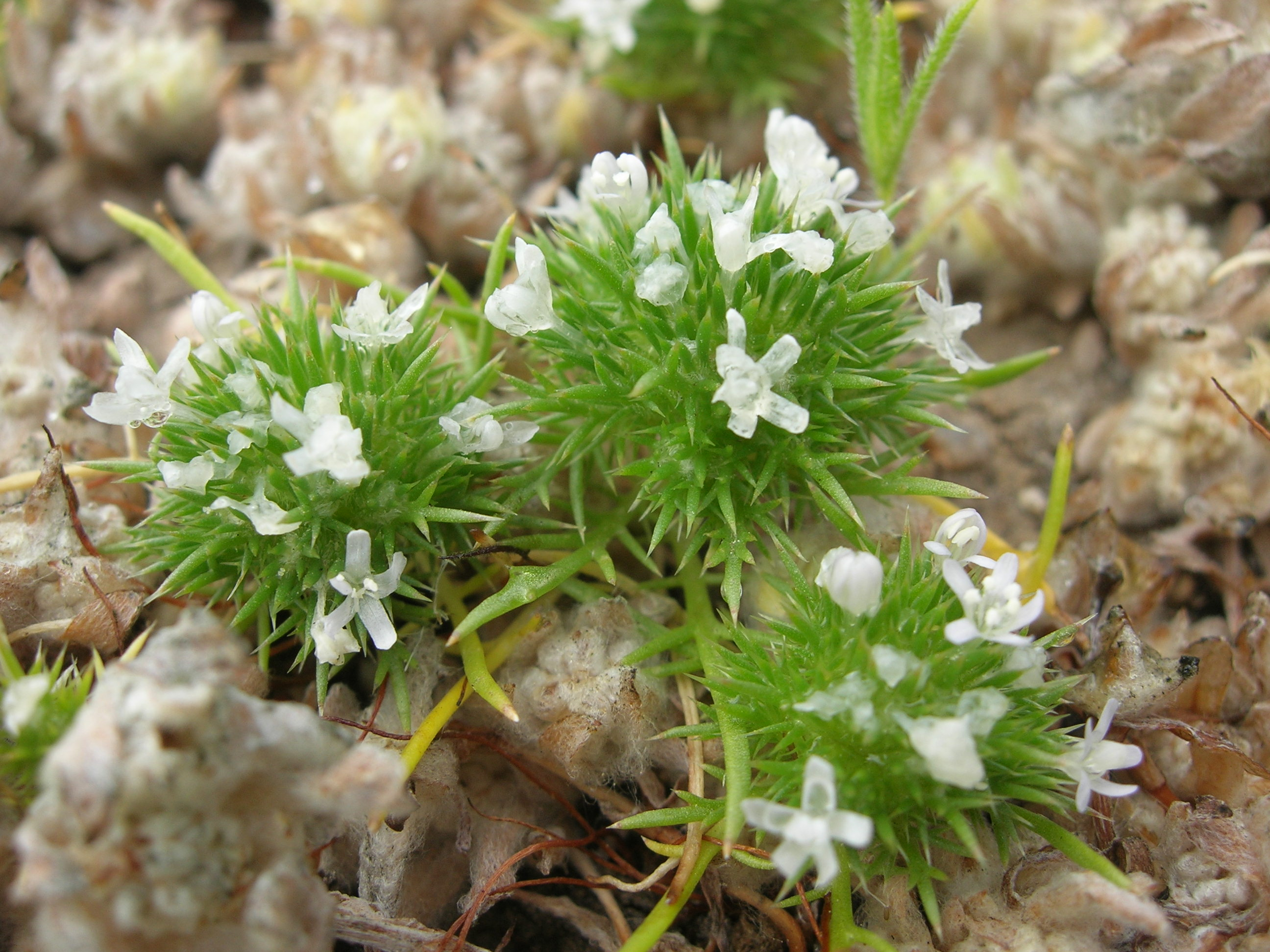

Conservation status
- Threatened (ESA)

Scientific classification
- Kingdom: Plantae
- Clade: Tracheophytes
- Clade: Angiosperms
- Clade: Eudicots
- Clade: Asterids
- Order: Ericales
- Family: Polemoniaceae
- Genus: Navarretia
- Species: N. fossalis

Binomial name
- Navarretia fossalis Moran

= Navarretia fossalis =

Species of flowering plant

Navarretia fossalis is a rare species of flowering plant in the phlox family known by the common name spreading navarretia.

== Distribution ==
The plant is native to southern California and Baja California, where it is known only from vernally wet areas, such as vernal pools, ditches, and other areas that are wet or flooded during the rainy season and dry the rest of the year. Many of these habitat areas have alkali soils arranged in uneven mounds and depressions that collect water and drain slowly before drying up.

The plant became a federally listed threatened species in the United States in 1998, when there were approximately 30 occurrences of the species remaining in Southern California and about nine left across the border in Baja California. By 2009, an additional 17 occurrences had been documented. The plant often occurs with Psilocarphus brevissimus.

== Description ==
Navarretia fossalis is a hairy annual herb producing a spreading stem up to about 15 centimeters high. The hairless leaves are up to 5 centimeters long and are divided into narrow linear lobes that turn spiny sharp when dry.

The inflorescence is a flat-topped head 1 or 2 centimeters wide filled with lobed bracts and clusters of flowers. The white or purple-tinged flowers are under a centimeter long and have corollas divided into minute narrow lobes under a millimeter long.

The fruit capsule yields a clump of tiny seeds that remain stuck together until they become wet, turning into a sticky, separating mass.

== See also ==
- California chaparral and woodlands
