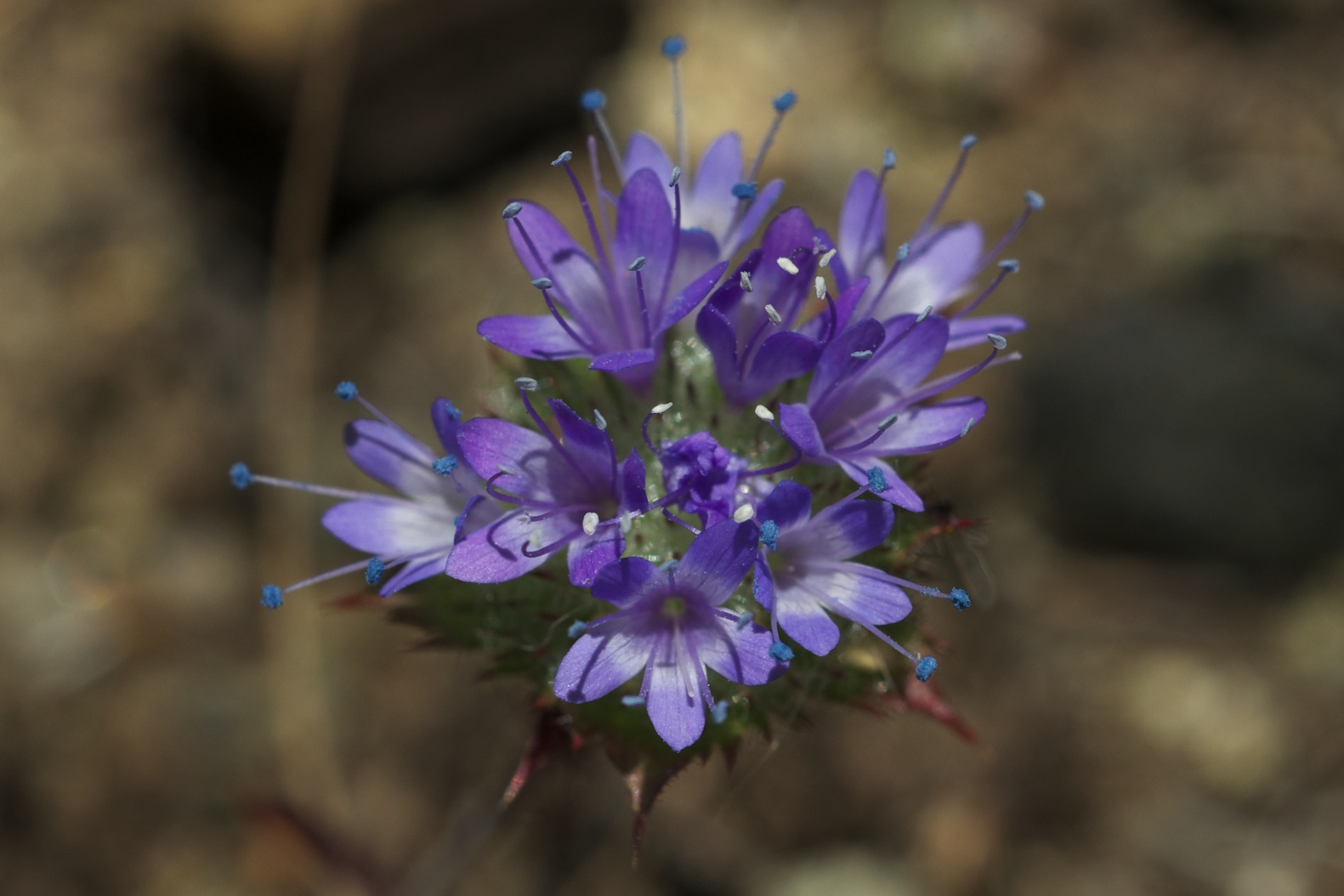

Scientific classification
- Kingdom: Plantae
- Clade: Tracheophytes
- Clade: Angiosperms
- Clade: Eudicots
- Clade: Asterids
- Order: Ericales
- Family: Polemoniaceae
- Genus: Navarretia
- Species: N. heterodoxa

Binomial name
- Navarretia heterodoxa Greene

= Navarretia heterodoxa =

Species of flowering plant

Navarretia heterodoxa is a species of flowering plant in the phlox family known by the common name Calistoga pincushionplant. It is endemic to the San Francisco Bay Area in California, where it grows in the serpentine soils of the hills and mountains.

It is a hairy annual herb producing a slender stem up to about 24 centimeters long. It is glandular and emits a skunky scent. The leaves are divided into threadlike or needlelike lobes. The inflorescence is a head of flowers lined with palmate bracts. The flowers are purple and roughly a centimeter long, their corollas divided into five lobes.
