= Navarretia prostrata =

Conservation status
- Imperiled (NatureServe)

Scientific classification
- Kingdom: Plantae
- Clade: Tracheophytes
- Clade: Angiosperms
- Clade: Eudicots
- Clade: Asterids
- Order: Ericales
- Family: Polemoniaceae
- Genus: Navarretia
- Species: N. prostrata

Binomial name
- Navarretia prostrata (A.Gray) Greene

Species of flowering plant

Navarretia prostrata is an uncommon species of flowering plant in the phlox family known by the common names prostrate pincushionplant and prostrate vernal pool navarretia. It is endemic to the U.S. state of California.

The plant has a scattered distribution from the San Francisco Bay Area, through the Transverse Ranges and Peninsular Ranges, to the southern border. It is an occasional member of the flora in vernal pools and similar habitat.

== Description ==
Navarretia prostrata is a petite annual herb sitting prostrate on the ground with a central stem and flower head and radiating stem branches bearing more heads. The hairless leaves are divided into many threadlike lobes. The inflorescence is a cluster of flowers surrounded by leaflike bracts. The flowers are just under a centimeter long, their blue or white corollas divided into narrow lobes.
