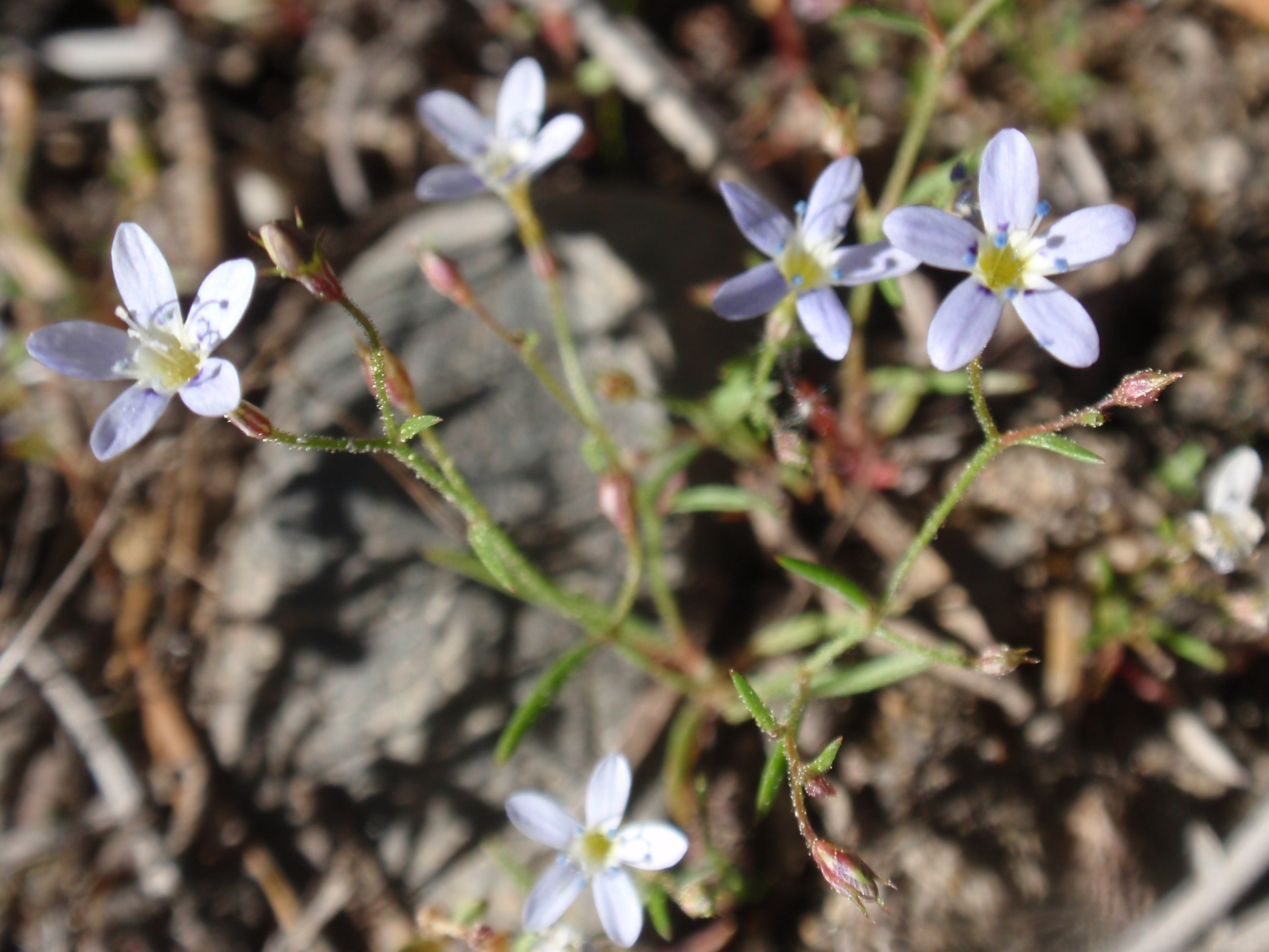

Conservation status
- Apparently Secure (NatureServe)

Scientific classification
- Kingdom: Plantae
- Clade: Embryophytes
- Clade: Tracheophytes
- Clade: Spermatophytes
- Clade: Angiosperms
- Clade: Eudicots
- Clade: Asterids
- Order: Ericales
- Family: Polemoniaceae
- Genus: Navarretia
- Species: N. capillaris

Binomial name
- Navarretia capillaris (Kellogg) Kuntze

Synonyms
- Allophyllum capillare; Gilia capillaris

= Navarretia capillaris =

Plant species in the phlox family

Navarretia capillaris (formerly Gilia capillaris) is a species of flowering plant in the phlox family known by the common name miniature gilia. It is native to the western United States where it grows in wet, gravel-lined habitat especially in mountains, such as snowmelt runs.

It produces glandular stems coated thinly in hairs and lined with small lance-shaped or linear leaves only one or two millimeters wide. The tiny stem is topped with an inflorescence of one or more flowers each roughly a centimeter long. The calyx is an elongated pocket of fused sepals with lobes separating at the top. The fuzzy, glandular corolla is white to light blue with a yellowish throat.

== Taxonomy ==
The first scientific description of Navarretia capillaris was by Albert Kellogg in 1873, placing the species in the Gilia genus as Gilia capillaris. A description moving it to Allophyllum was published in 1999 by Alva George Day and Verne Grant, but the 1891 classification of the species in Navarretia by Otto Kuntze is the accepted species name according to Plants of the World Online. Together with its genus it is part of the Polemoniaceae and has no subspecies.

== Range and habitat ==
Miniature gilias are native to six western states, Washington, Oregon, California, Nevada, Utah, and Idaho. In Washington it only grows in a few areas in the western part of the state, but in Oregon it is widespread, especially in the south. It is found in both northern and southern California, but only in Washoe and Elko counties in northern Nevada. In Utah the species is only recorded in Cache County and grows in five counties in southern Idaho.
