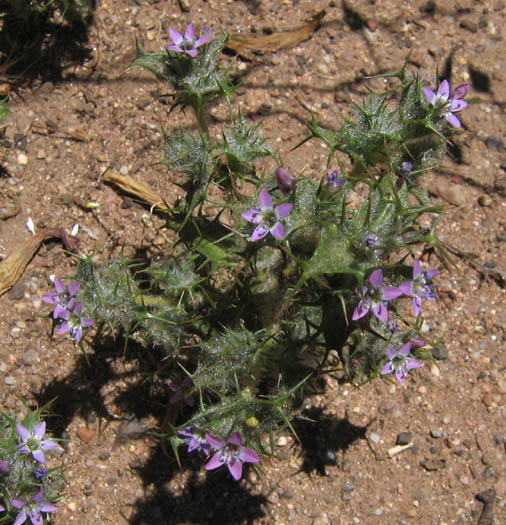

Conservation status
- Apparently Secure (NatureServe)

Scientific classification
- Kingdom: Plantae
- Clade: Tracheophytes
- Clade: Angiosperms
- Clade: Eudicots
- Clade: Asterids
- Order: Ericales
- Family: Polemoniaceae
- Genus: Navarretia
- Species: N. hamata

Binomial name
- Navarretia hamata Greene

= Navarretia hamata =

Species of flowering plant

Navarretia hamata is a species of flowering plant in the phlox family known by the common name hooked pincushionplant.

== Distribution ==
The plant is native to the coastal mountains and valleys of California and Baja California.

It is found from the Monterey Bay area, through the Central Coast, to the lower slopes of the Transverse Ranges and Peninsular Ranges and coastal mesas in Southern California, as well as on the three of the Channel Islands and south into Baja California. It is often a member of the chaparral flora.

== Description ==
Navarretia hamata is a hairy, glandular annual herb producing a spreading, erect stem up to about 30 centimeters tall. It usually has a strong skunky scent. The leaves are divided into narrow, sharp-tipped lobes, the ones at the tip of each leaf hooked.

The inflorescence is a head filled with leaflike green bracts. The pink or purple flowers are tubular with five-lobed corollas and measure up to 1.5 centimeters long.
