= Sorrento Valley, San Diego =

- Community of San Diego
- Sorrento Valley
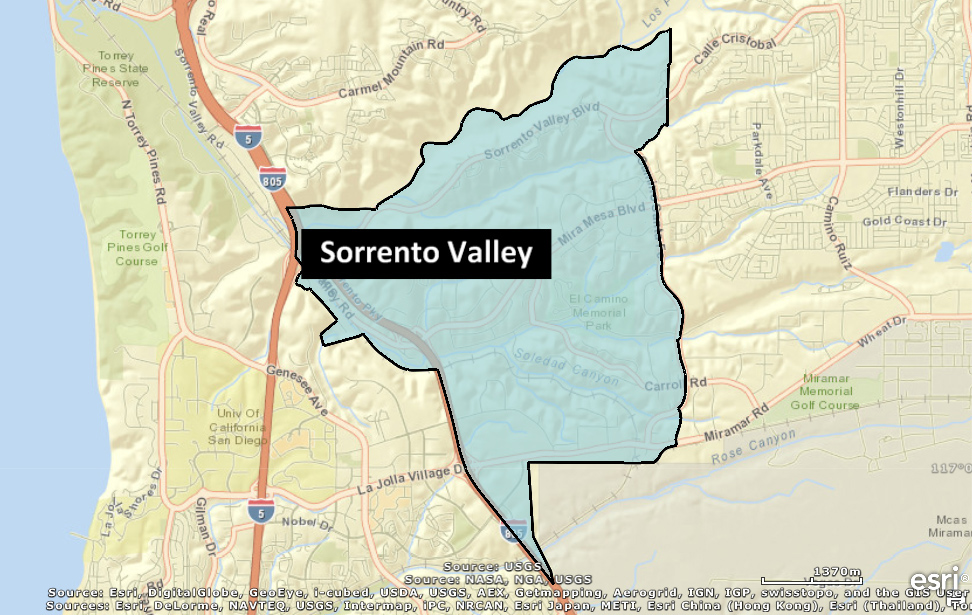
- Coordinates: 32°54′09″N 117°11′07″W
- Country: United States of America
- State: California
- County: San Diego
- City: San Diego

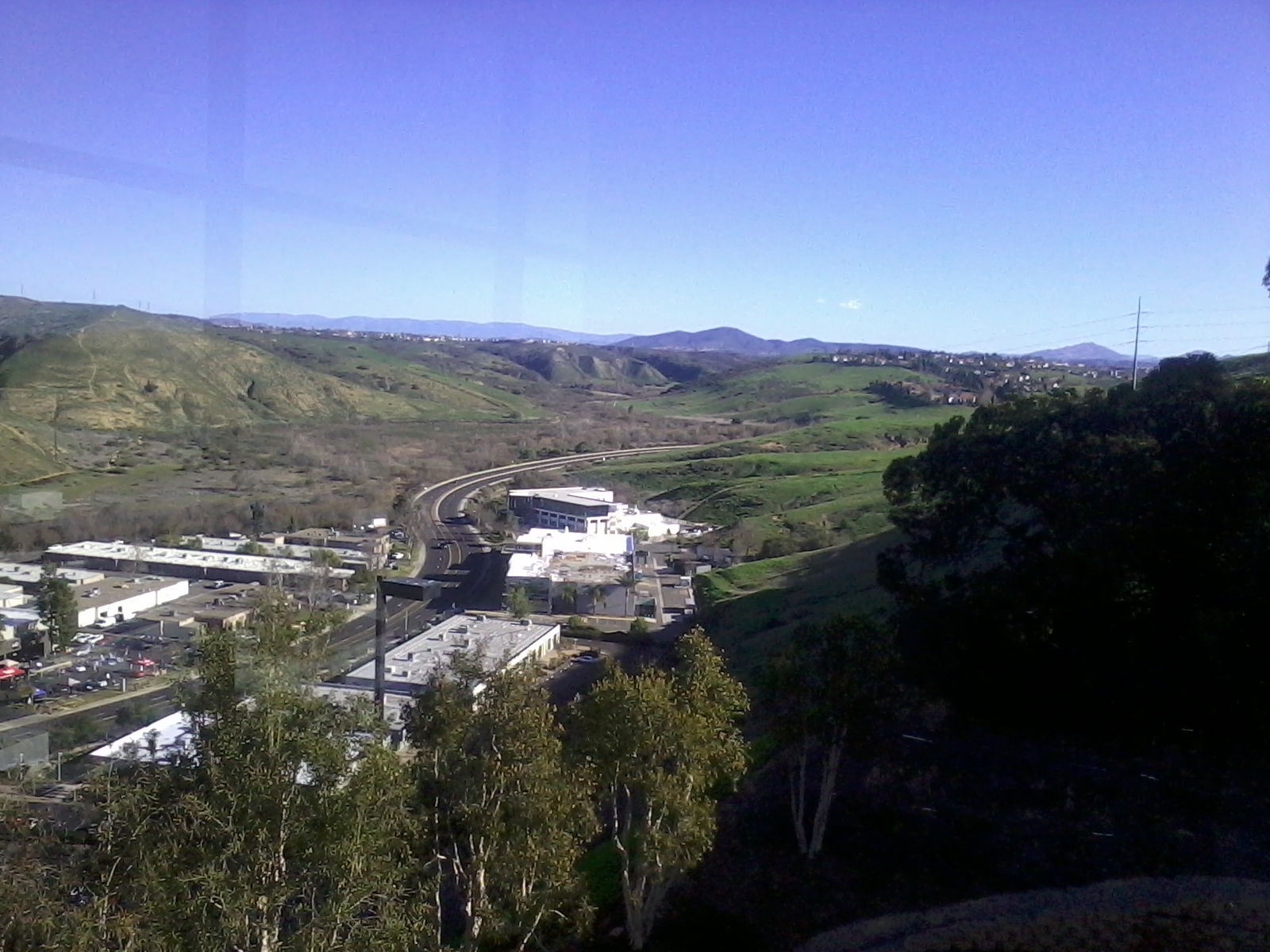
Western Los Peñasquitos Canyon

Sorrento Valley is a neighborhood of San Diego, California. It is roughly bounded by Interstate 5 and Interstate 805, Camino Santa Fe to the east, the Los Peñasquitos Canyon Preserve to the north and Miramar Road to the south, as shown on the San Diego Police Department's neighborhood map. It encompasses Sorrento Mesa and is part of San Diego Unified School District.

While originally envisioned and zoned for industrial use, Sorrento Valley is now home to over 5,000 residents spread across three major single family home and condominium developments. Sorrento Valley is known as a center for high tech, biotech and scientific research, aided by its close proximity to the University of California, San Diego. It is part of the city's Mira Mesa, Torrey Pines, and University community planning areas.

== History ==
=== Kumeyaay Village of Ystagua ===
Before European contact, Sorrento Valley was home to a Kumeyaay village then known as Ystagua (pronounced "istawa") meaning 'worm's (larvae) house' in the Kumeyaay language. The village had been continuously occupied from as early as 1800 BCE, and had a peak population of 200 residents around the year 1700. The village of Ystagua was a major manufacturing, food processing, and trade center in the region, with ample access to shellfish, fish, game, and wild grasses. The village was arranged with tool manufacturing land use east of what is now Sorrento Valley Road and residential use west of the road around Roselle St.

Gaspar de Portolá's expedition visited the valley in 1769 and found it to have a high capacity of agriculture. The village of Ystagua to be a trade hub. The area would be later be referred as Ranchería de la Nuestra Señora de la Soledad to the Spanish missionaries. The population of Ystagua had dropped to about 100 residents by 1800 after the spread of European diseases plagued the area.

=== Neighborhood of Sorrento Valley ===
In the 1880s, the California Southern Railroad was constructed through the valley to connect National City and San Bernardino with Chinese laborers who previously worked on the Central Pacific Railroad in the 1860s.

During the 1912 San Diego free speech fight, vigilantes aligned with police brought arrested members of the Industrial Workers of the World from the free speech protest in downtown San Diego to Sorrento Valley. Vigilantes subjected these protesters to patriot indoctrination and forced them to kneel in front of the flag and sing the "Star Spangled Banner" in-key, which left an unknown number of IWW members dead or injured. Those that survived the ordeal were forcibly exiled from the City of San Diego under the threat of death.

The construction of the I-5 in the 1960s and 1970s brought industrial and office development into the area, which helped foster a prominent biotech and IT industry.

== Economy ==
Sorrento Valley is home to many high tech, biotech, and IT companies. Notable companies in the neighborhood include Qualcomm, Pfizer Pharmaceuticals, Verizon, FedHome Loan Centers, Google Inc., Texas Instruments, Optimer Pharmaceuticals, The ACTIVE Network, Advanced Test Equipment Rentals, Forcepoint (formerly Websense), Einstein Medical, Hologic, Dexcom, NuVasive, T-Mobile, PriceWaterhouseCoopers (PwC), and Scripps Clinic. In 2011 the Federal Bureau of Investigation announced plans to move into a $100 million, six-story building on Vista Sorrento Parkway in Sorrento Valley. The building houses 400 special agents and support staff; the FBI occupied the building in May 2013.

Karl Strauss Brewing Company, a craft beer brewer, has a location in Sorrento Valley.

=== Personal income ===
The community (ZIP Code 92121) has a median income of approximately $102,391 per year.

== Transportation ==
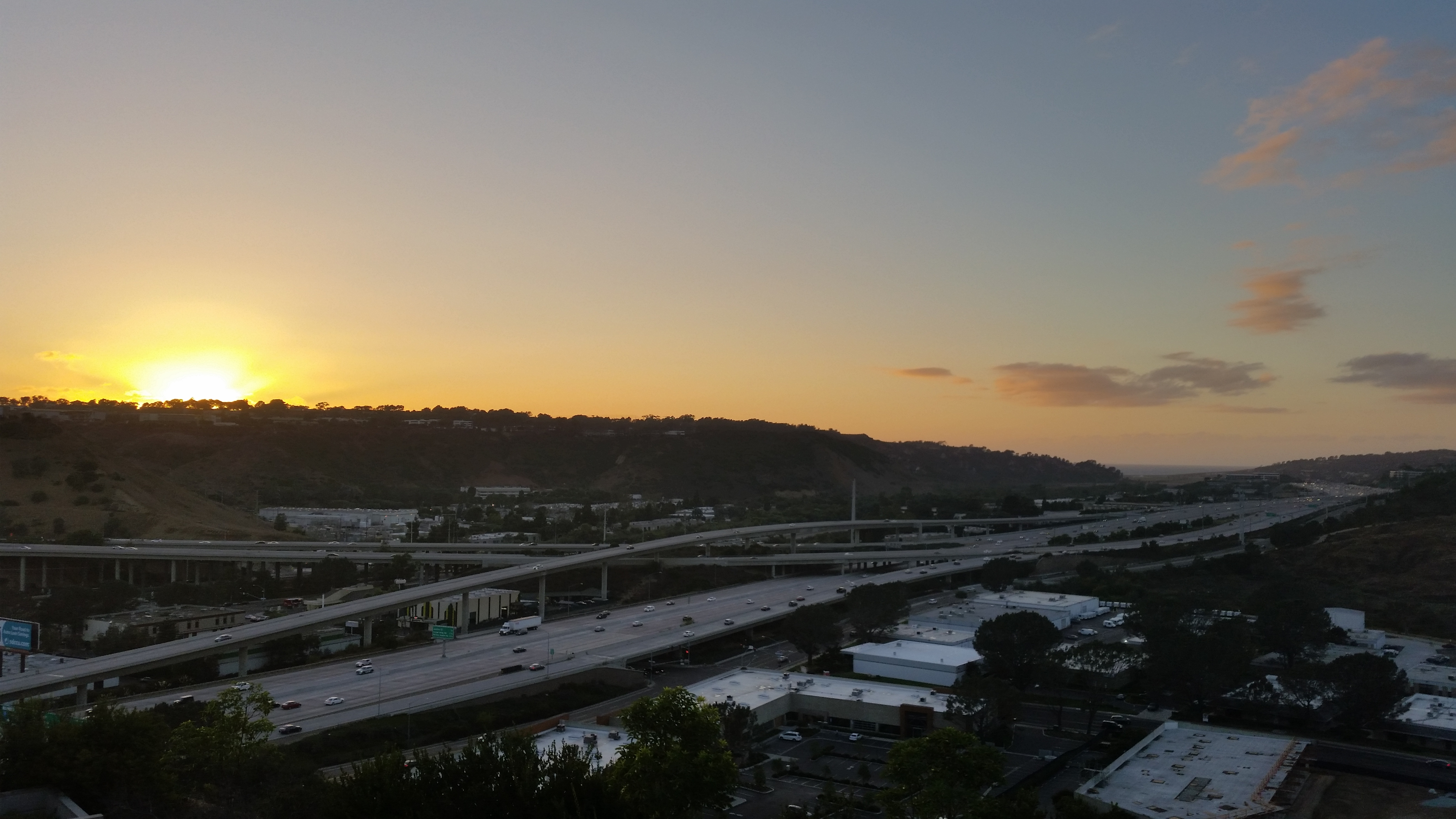
Intersection of Interstate 5 and Interstate 805

The west edge of Sorrento Valley contains the merge of I-5 and I-805. The Sorrento Valley station is a stop for the Coaster commuter rail line, which provides train links to Oceanside and Downtown San Diego.

== Major company headquarters ==
- Accelrys US corporate headquarters
- Arena Pharmaceuticals corporate headquarters
- Dexcom corporate headquarters
- Qualcomm corporate headquarters
- Tandem corporate headquarters
- VA Home Loan Centers corporate headquarters
- Webster University San Diego Metropolitan Campus
