= Valencia Park, San Diego =

- Community of San Diego
- Valencia Park
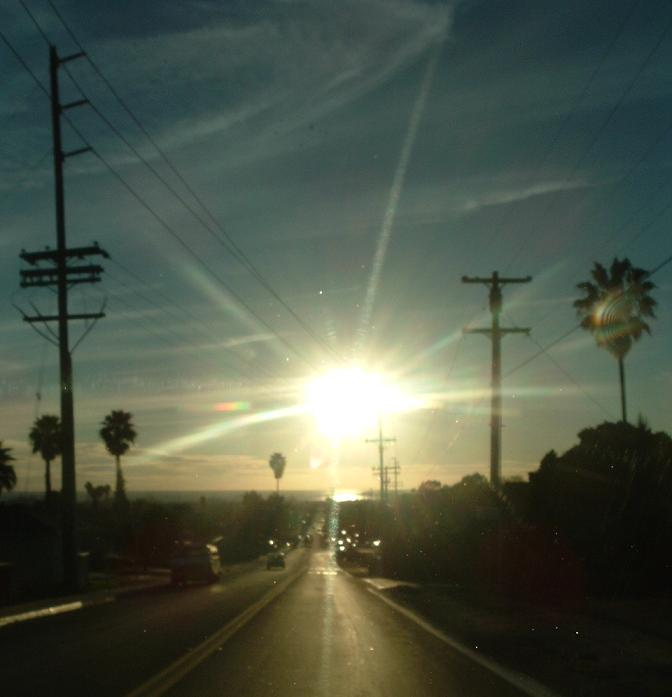
- Down Division Street, facing West, between the neighborhoods of Valencia Park and Alta Vista in Southeast San Diego
- Nickname: "V.P."
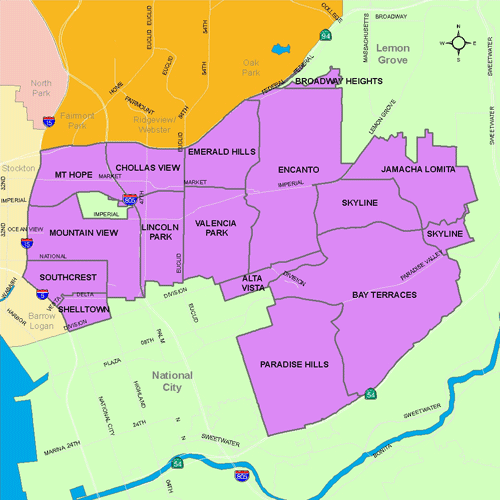
- Valencia Park is located in the southeastern area of the City of San Diego

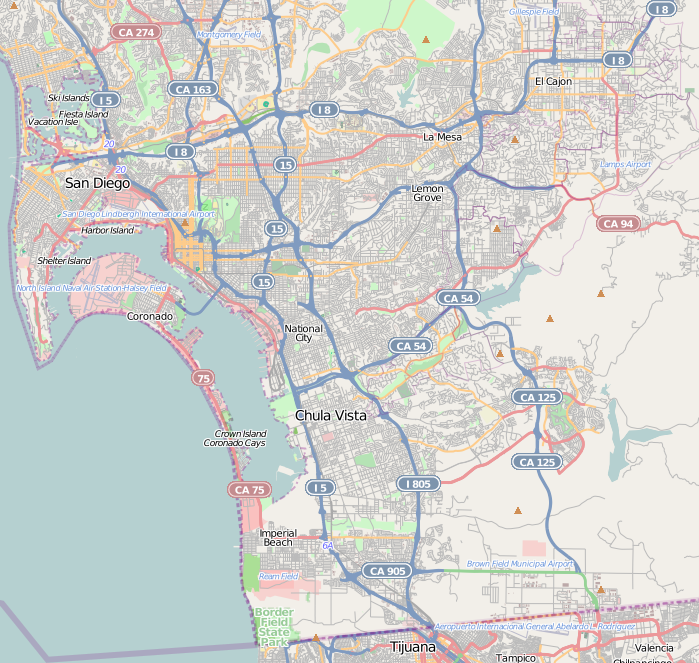
- Location within San Diego
- Coordinates: 32.701°N 117.076°W
- Country: United States of America
- State: California
- County: San Diego
- City: San Diego
- ZIP Code: 92114

Valencia Park is an urban community in the southeastern section of San Diego, California, United States. It is bordered by Emerald Hills and Market Street on the north, Lincoln Park and Euclid Avenue to the West, Encanto to the east, and Alta Vista and National City, California, to the south. Major thoroughfares include Imperial Avenue, Churchward Street, and Valencia Parkway.

== History ==
The resident and San Diego real estate entrepreneur Astor Basmajian donated part of the property to Valencia Park Elementary (playground area). An earlier resident of this community, Astor bought several pieces of property within Valencia Park and in San Diego County. From buying and selling homes that were already there and building a subdivision of new homes within the neighborhood later named Astor Heights, he helped contribute to the earlier history of the Valencia Park community. Astor Basmajian, an immigrant from Armenia, escaped the genocide early and became a millionaire twice in his lifetime. A jeweler by trade, he and his brother opened a jewelry shop in New York shortly before World War I. Both brothers served in the war. After returning from the war, Astor continued his business and later moved to Ohio and California, where he remained the rest of his life, living out the "American Dream."

With the great influx of Filipino immigrants joining the United States Navy, especially from the Vietnam War era on to the 1990s, many Filipinos inhabited the Southeast San Diego neighborhoods of Alta Vista, Bay Terraces, Paradise Hills, Shelltown, Skyline Hills, and Valencia Park, both for the relatively affordable housing prices and its proximity to Naval Base San Diego.

== Demographics ==
Valencia Park is a diverse community with one of the most significant African-American populations in the City. Current demographics for the neighborhood are as follows: people of Hispanic heritage make up 52.6%, followed by African-Americans at 26.4%, then Asians at 15.6%, non-Hispanic Whites at 3.4%, Mixed Race at 2.0%, and others at 0.1%. It ranked near the very bottom at 121 out of 125 San Diego neighborhoods in terms of lowest percentage of non-Hispanic whites, and 4 out of 125 San Diego neighborhoods in terms of total population that is non-White (roughly 96.6%), topped only by bordering Lincoln Park, San Ysidro, and Southcrest.

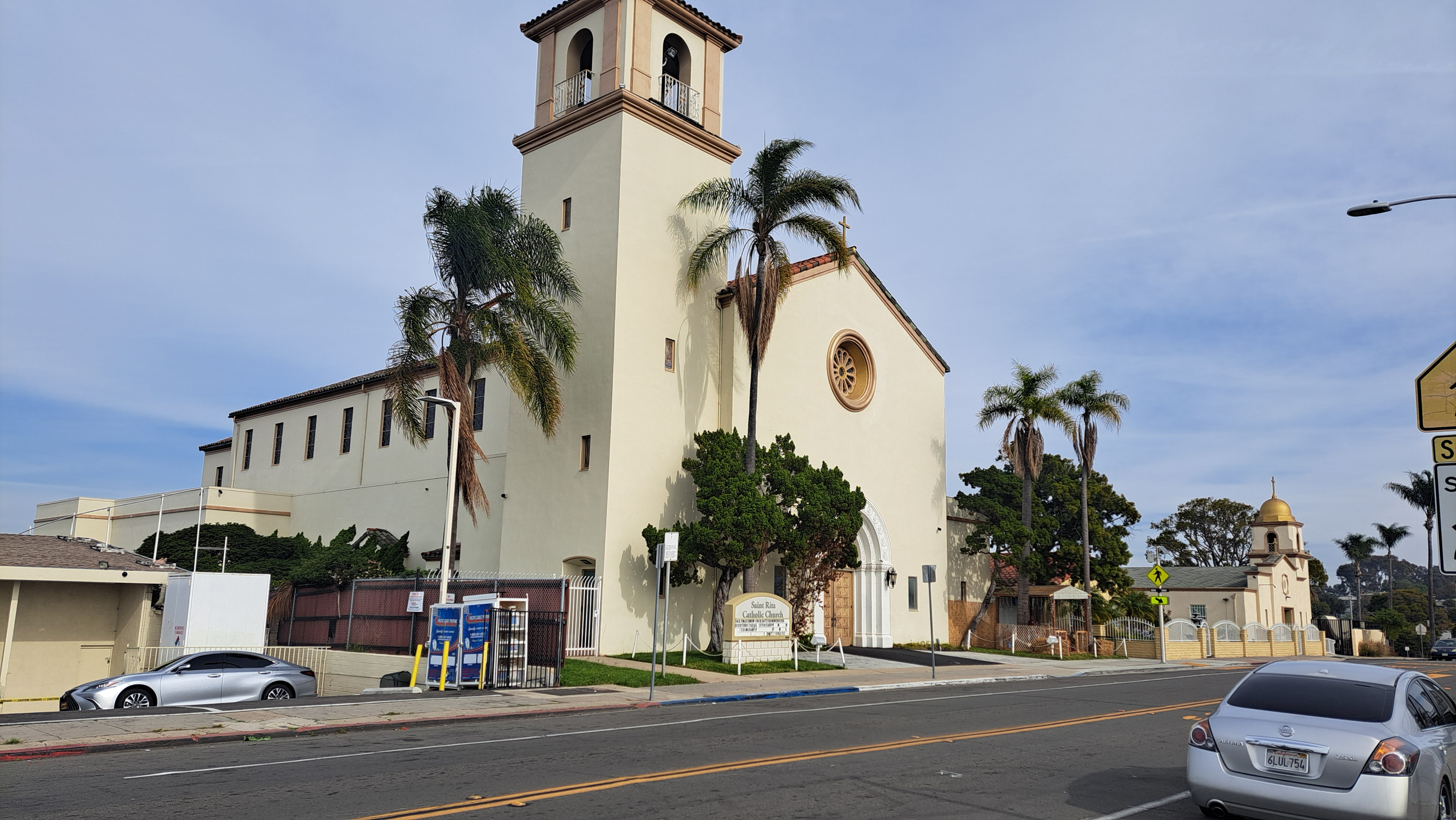
St. Rita's Catholic Church, 5124 Churchward St.

== Landmarks and facilities ==
Valencia Park shares Market Creek Plaza, a shopping center, with neighboring Lincoln Park.

A portion of Chollas Creek runs through Valencia Park.

== Education ==
Valencia Park is served by San Diego Unified School District. Public schools in Valencia Park include Valencia Park Elementary School, Nye Elementary School, Lincoln High School in bordering Lincoln Park, Morse High School in nearby Skyline, and The O'Farrell Charter Schools, an organization of charter schools located in bordering O'Farrell Park.

Much like the rest of Southeast San Diego, many students in Valencia Park have taken advantage of San Diego Unified School District's Voluntary Enrollment Exchange Program (VEEP) and have opted to be bused to high schools in San Diego's more affluent northern suburban neighborhoods, Depending on their VEEP Allied School Pattern, a high school student may be voluntarily bused to Mira Mesa High School, Mission Bay High School, Scripps Ranch High School, Serra High School, and University City High School.
