= Skyline, San Diego =

- Community of San Diego
- Skyline
- Nicknames: "Skyline Hills", "Skyline Park"
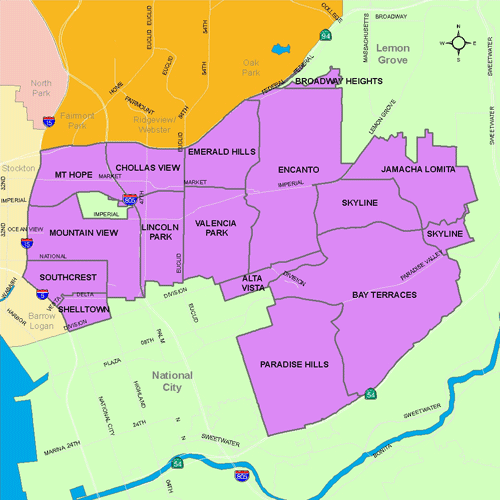
- Skyline is located in the southeastern area of the city of San Diego

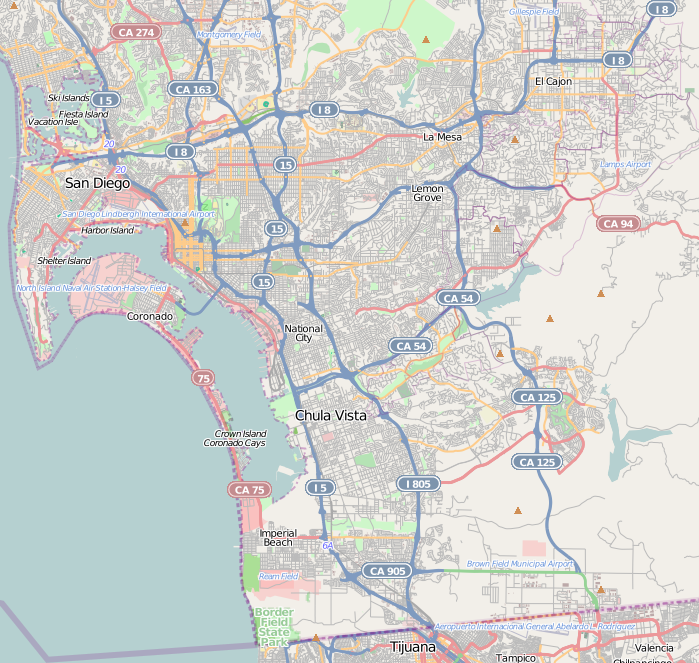
- Location within Southeast San Diego
- Coordinates: 32.7087°N 117.0412°W
- Country: United States of America
- State: California
- County: San Diego
- City: San Diego

Skyline is a hilly urban neighborhood in San Diego, California, located in Southeastern San Diego. It is bordered by Encanto to the west, Lomita to the East, Jamacha to the North, and Bay Terraces to the South. . The neighborhood is part of the Skyline-Paradise Hills Community Planning Area. The Skyline neighborhood has unofficial names such as Greater Skyline, Skyline Hills, in violatation of the community plan.

== History ==
Prior to "white flight" in the 1960s and early 1970s, many neighborhoods in Southeast San Diego were subject to discriminatory restrictive covenants, a problem faced by African-Americans like former Councilman and Deputy Mayor George Stevens, who was denied the opportunity to purchase a house in the Skyline Hills from a white realtor. Presently, much of the Skyline Hills, as well as other Encanto neighborhoods such as Emerald Hills, Lincoln Park, Mountain View, O'Farrell, South Encanto, and Valencia Park, have a substantial African-American population.

With the great influx of Filipino immigrants joining the United States Navy, especially from the Vietnam War era on to the 1990s, many Filipinos inhabited the Southeast San Diego neighborhoods of Alta Vista, Bay Terraces, Paradise Hills, Shelltown, Skyline Hills, and Valencia Park, both for the relatively affordable housing prices and its close proximity to Naval Base San Diego.

== Geography ==
The Skyline-Paradise Hills Community as a whole make up approximately 4,500 acres. Much like the surrounding neighborhoods of Jamacha, North Bay Terraces, Paradise Hills, South Bay Terraces and Lomita it is composed predominantly of low-density single-family homes spread across the hilly area. There are two major geographic features in the Skyline- Paradise Hills Community Planning area, one is Jamacha Open Space System with Chollas Creek Watershed running on an east to west axis, which flows into San Diego Bay.

The second is Paradise Valley, which runs through the middle of the Paradise Hills community and gives rise to the Paradise Creek, which flows into San Diego Bay. Skyline, along with North Bay Terrace, Jamacha, and Lomita are north of Paradise Valley Rd.

== Demographics ==
Skyline is a very diverse neighborhood and home to one of the largest concentrations of African-Americans in the City. Current demographics for the neighborhood are as follows: people of Hispanic heritage make up 36.4%, followed by African-Americans at 31.6%, Asian at 19.9%, non-Hispanic Whites 7.0%, Mixed Race at 4.4% and others 0.6% It ranked 112 out of 125 San Diego neighborhoods in terms of lowest percentage of non-Hispanic whites, and 13 out of 125 San Diego neighborhoods in terms of total population that is non-White (roughly 93.0%).

== Image ==
Much like other neighborhoods in Southeast San Diego, Skyline consists of postwar tract homes built in the 1950s and 1960's that have been outfitted with iron bars over the ground-floor windows and doors, as well as cast-iron gates and chain-link fences guarding driveways, a reflection of the perceived need for security in these historically high-crime urban neighborhoods.

Skyline has endured decades of narcotic problems and gang violence, and was the target of several law enforcement operations and sweeps, targeting the Skyline East Side Piru gang in particular, an offshoot gang started by members of the Eastside Hanging Gang (EHG) and a relocated Piru gang member from Compton, and believed to be one of the largest Blood gangs in San Diego. Hundreds of members of the gang have been arrested as a result of these periodic sweeps since 1990. The East Side Pirus are referenced along other Piru affiliated groups as "the Skylines" in the 1993 single, "Piru Love" by Los Angeles-based rap group, Bloods & Crips. They have held a long-bitter rivalry with the Lincoln Park Bloods, which has been attributed to much of the violent crime and homicides across Southeast San Diego.

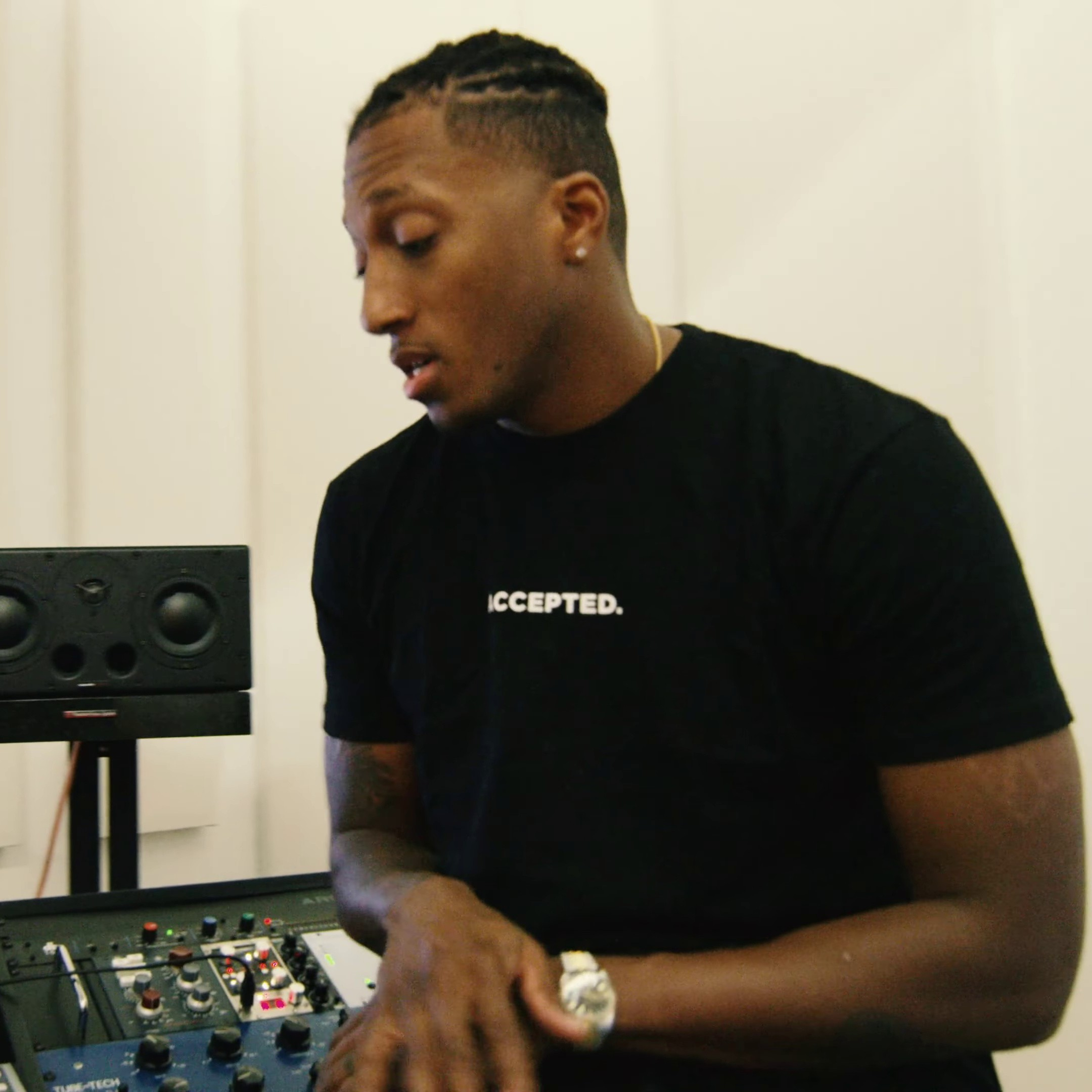
Lecrae in 2018

Notable Hip Hop artist, Lecrae, who spent significant portions of his life living with his grandmother in Skyline, experienced much of the violence occurring in the community, and has paid tribute to the neighborhood in his songs including his 2013 single, "I'm Turnt," ("It's Southeast Daygo in the building, shout out to Peter Pan, Skyline, Imperial"), and the 2019 single, "California Dreamin'" with 116, ("What up Southeast? (Daygo), raised me to be a lil' beast, caught a couple fades in the streets, played on the beach ...I'm rollin' down Imperial, old school in my stereo, from Skyline, you don't hear me, though (Skyline))." The music video for the latter was filmed entirely in the Skyline neighborhood that he grew up in.

== Government ==
Skyline is within the 4th City Council District. The district has long been represented by Myrtle Cole since she won a special election in 2013 through 2018. It is currently represented by Henry L. Foster III, who was elected in 2024. Federally, the neighborhood is within the California's 53rd congressional district.

== Education ==
Samuel F. B. Morse High School in the Skyline-Bay Terraces area

Skyline is served primarily by San Diego Unified School District along with some charter and private schools. Schools that serve Skyline students include Morse High School, the largest school in the area, Keiller Leadership Academy, a college-preparatory charter school partnered with the University of San Diego, and The O'Farrell Charter Schools, an educational complex chartered as multiple schools in one, located at just the in-between area of Skyline and South Encanto.

Much like the rest of Southeast San Diego, many students in Skyline have taken advantage of San Diego Unified School District's Voluntary Enrollment Exchange Program (VEEP), and have opted to be bused to high schools in San Diego's more affluent northern suburban neighborhoods. Depending on their VEEP Allied School Pattern, a high school student may be voluntarily bused to Mira Mesa High School, Mission Bay High School, Scripps Ranch High School, Serra High School, and University City High School.
