= O'Farrell, San Diego =

- Community of San Diego
- O'Farrell
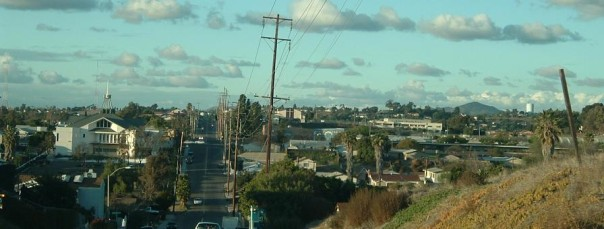
- View of O'Farrell from atop 61st Street
- Nickname: "O'Farrell Park"
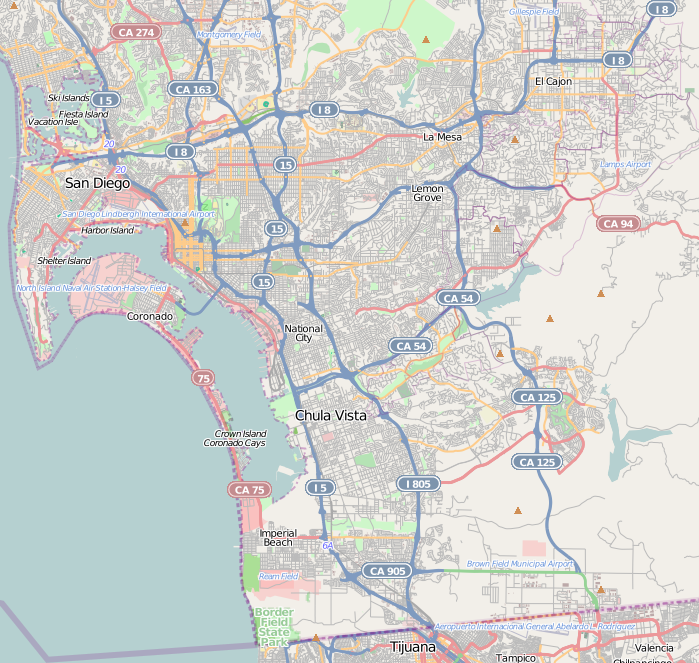
- Location within Southeast San Diego
- Coordinates: 32°42′18.6″N 117°03′42.2″W
- Country: United States of America
- State: California
- County: San Diego
- City: San Diego
- ZIP Code: 92114

O'Farrell (South Encanto, O'Farrell Park) is an urban region in San Diego, California, located in Southeast San Diego. It includes portions of Skyline, Encanto and Valencia Park. The area borders North Bay Terraces to the east and Alta Vista to the south.

== Government ==
O'Farrell is located within the 4th City Council District of San Diego. The district is currently represented by Henry L. Foster III, who was elected in 2024. Federally, the neighborhood is within California's 53rd congressional district.

== See also ==
- List of neighborhoods of San Diego, California
