= Bay Terraces, San Diego =

Bay Terraces, San Diego North Bay Terrace, South Bay Terrace
- Community of San Diego
- Bay Terraces
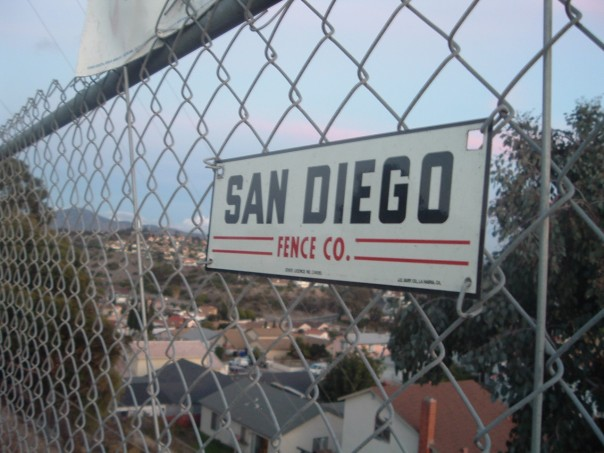
- Bay Terraces, as seen from Division Street
- Nicknames: "P.H.", "Skyline Park" (geographically inaccurate but widely used due to proximity with bordering Paradise Hills and Skyline, the latter attributed to long-held territorial relations with the Skyline East Side Pirus)
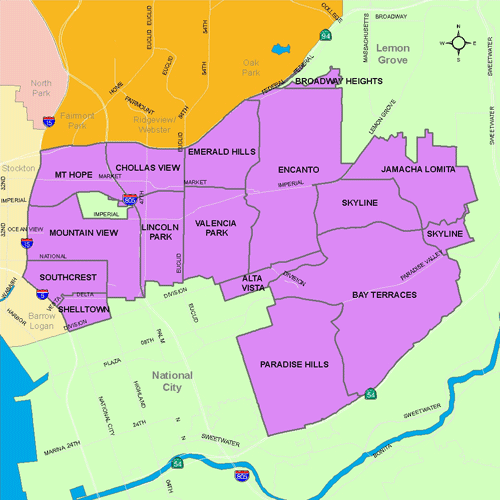
- Bay Terraces is located in the southeastern area of the city of San Diego

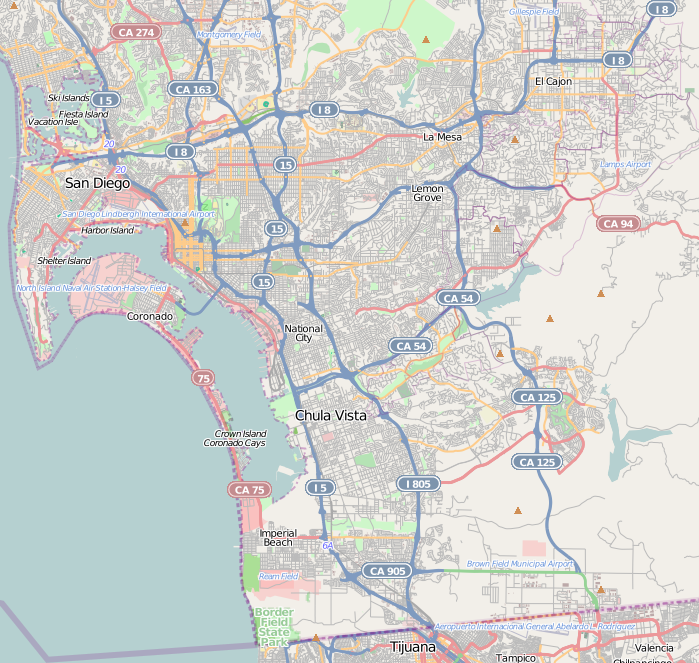
- Location within Southeast San Diego
- Coordinates: 32.690425°N 117.040358°W
- Country: United States of America
- State: California
- County: San Diego
- City: San Diego

Area
  - Total: 3.1 sq mi (8.0 km^{2})

Population (2019)
  - Total: 29,419
  - Density: 9,806/sq mi (3,786/km^{2})
- ZIP Code: 92114 and 92139

Bay Terraces is a hilly urban neighborhood in the southeastern part of San Diego, California, United States. A composite of North Bay Terrace and South Bay Terrace, it is bordered by Skyline to the north, Paradise Hills to the southwest, Alta Vista, South Encanto and National City to the west. The southern end of the neighborhood is bordered by State Route 54 and Bonita. The neighborhood generally includes the ZIP Codes 92114 and 92139 and as such, parts of the area have often been incorrectly referred to as either "Paradise Hills" (adjacent to South Bay Terrace) or "Skyline Hills" (adjacent to North Bay Terrace) due to its proximity and overlapping ZIP Codes. Nevertheless, Bay Terraces is the largest neighborhood in the Skyline-Paradise Hills Community Planning Area.

== History ==
The neighborhood was annexed by San Diego in 1969. In 1976 and 1977 Peñasquitos, Inc, submitted revisions to the initial 1969 Plan, including adjustments to housing, open space, and circulation, resulting in the development and urbanization of Bay Terraces. Hence, from the late 1970s to early 1980s, in the interest of urban renewal, this massive, unused tract of land (formerly a canyon) between the Skyline and Paradise Hills neighborhoods underwent development. This tract would eventually become Bay Terraces. The notion of a new subdivision built directly triangulated in what were already considered high-crime areas repelled the great majority of home-buyers. The homes were also priced out of the range of typical residents of the area and most went unsold or, in some cases, unbuilt. Federal subsidies and economic programs were then employed to assist in completing and populating the subdivision. As a result, military personnel, Filipino immigrants with military ties, and low-income families were able to secure loans to buy the new homes in the area. The federally funded recovery project was only marginally successful, however, as several large portions of the development stood partially constructed and abandoned for nearly twenty years, the most noticeable example at the intersection of Skyline Dr. and Woodman Ave.

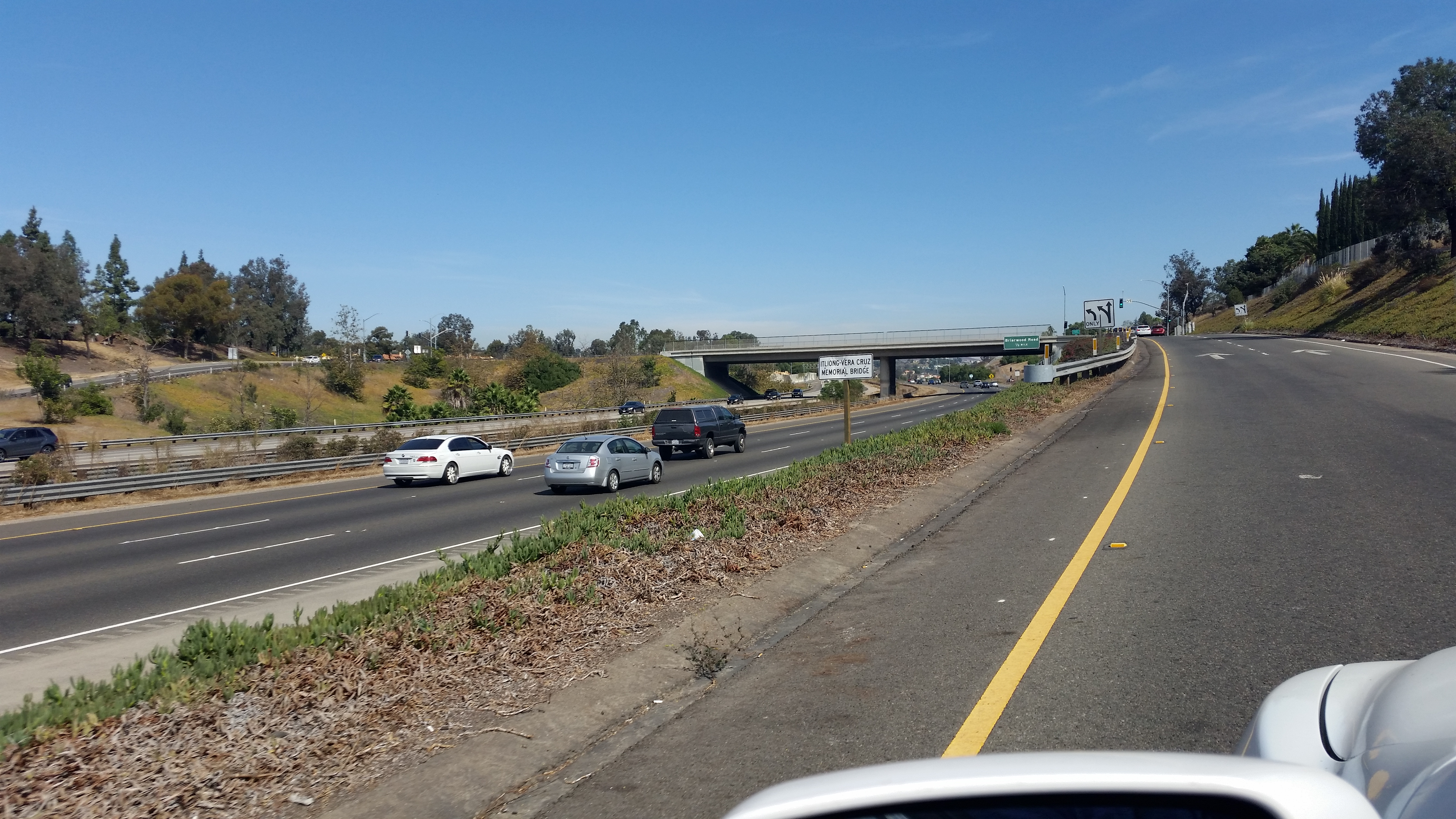
Itliong-Vera Cruz Memorial Bridge as seen from the West.

With the great influx of Filipino immigrants joining the United States Navy, especially from the Vietnam War era on to the 1990s, many Filipinos inhabited the Southeast San Diego neighborhoods of Alta Vista, Bay Terraces, Paradise Hills, Shelltown, Skyline Hills, and Valencia Park, both for the relatively affordable housing prices and its close proximity to Naval Base San Diego.

At present, Bay Terraces remains home to a significant Filipino American population. In 2015, a bridge on the south edge of the neighborhood was named for Larry Itliong and Philip Vera Cruz. Also in 2015, a Filipino American was sentenced to over 50 years in prison for his role in a 2010 shooting and death of a San Diego Police Officer, although he was not the person who shot the police officer.

== Geography ==
Bay Terraces takes up a little over 40% of the 4,500 acres that make up the Skyline-Paradise Hills Community. Much like the surrounding neighborhoods of Skyline, Paradise Hills, and Jamacha-Lomita, the area is composed predominantly of low-density single-family homes spread across the hilly area. A major geographic feature is Paradise Valley, which runs on an east–west axis through the middle of the community and gives rise to the Paradise Creek, which flows into San Diego Bay. Paradise Valley Rd itself splits Bay Terraces up to North Bay Terrace and South Bay Terrace.

== Demographics ==
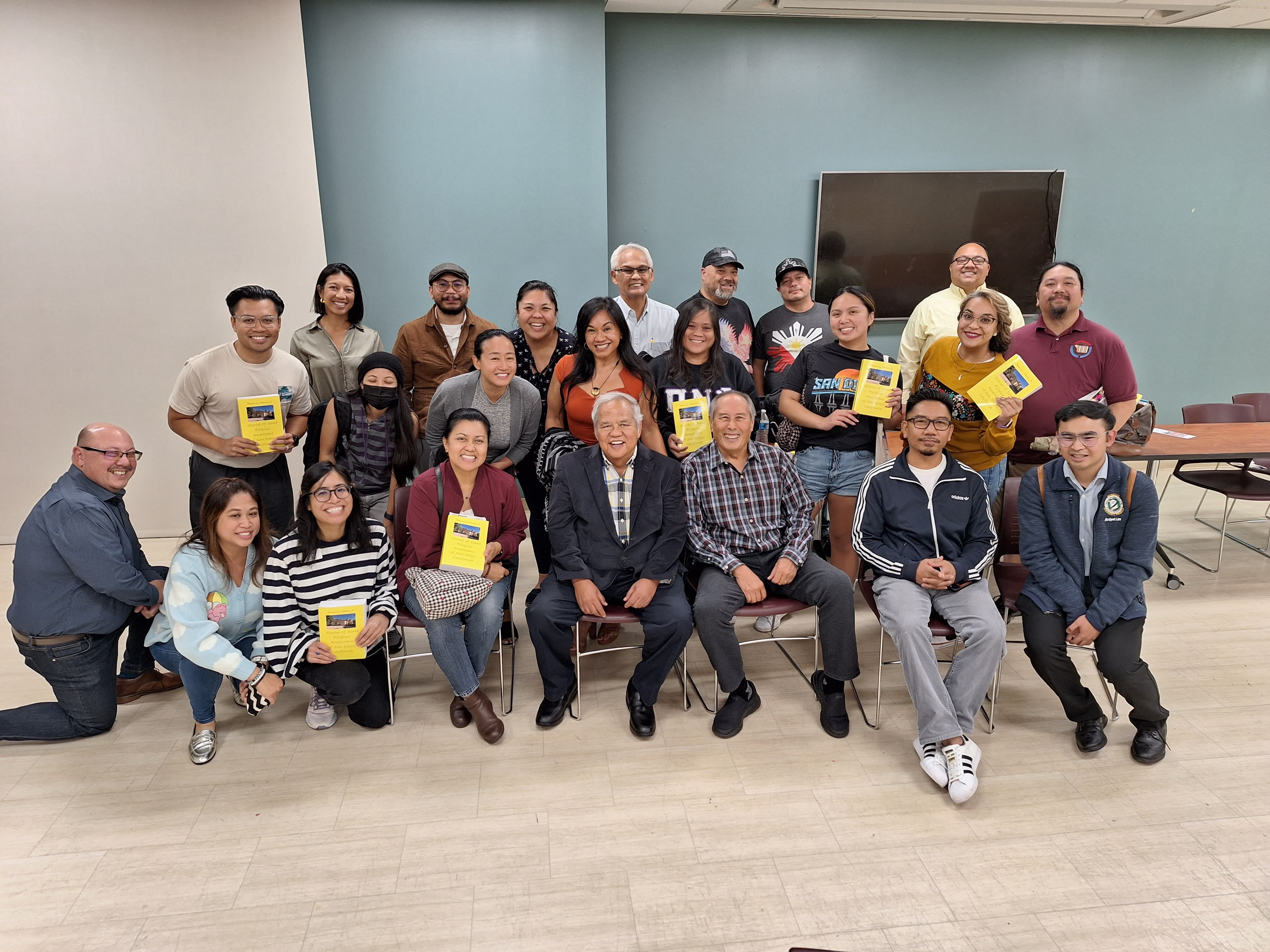
A group of Filipino Americans at Skyline Hills Library.

Bay Terraces has a diverse population spread across its 31,896 residents. The population density was 9,806 per square mile (3,786/km^{2}). The racial makeup of Bay Terraces was 2,883 (9.1%) non-Hispanic White, 3,902 (12.4%) African American, 14,000 (44.3%) Asian (the overwhelming majority of which are of Filipino descent), 1,434 (4.5%) from two or more races and 485 (1.5%) from other races. Hispanic or Latino excluding black and Asian Hispanics was 8,846 persons (28.1%). It ranked 101 out of 125 San Diego neighborhoods in terms of lowest percentage of non-Hispanic whites, and 24 out of 125 San Diego neighborhoods in terms of total population that is non-White (roughly 90%).

== Image ==
Commonly seen across Southeast San Diego, many homes in Bay Terraces are tract homes built in the late 1970s to early 1980's that have been outfitted with iron bars over the ground-floor windows and doors, as well as cast-iron gates and chain-link fences guarding driveways, a reflection of the perceived need for security in these historically high-crime urban neighborhoods. Additionally, it is home to the sprawling Meadowbrook Apartments, an expansive low-income housing project which has long been plagued by drug sales, violence, and homicides. The area in and around the Bay Terraces complex has been the target of several law enforcement operations and sweeps, targeting the Skyline East Side Piru gang in particular, believed to be one of the largest Blood gangs in San Diego. Hundreds of members of the gang have been arrested as a result of these periodic sweeps since 1990. The 22-acre, 448 unit complex recently underwent an extensive renovation by Seattle-based Vitus Group, which purchased the housing projects in 2013 and completed upgrades in 2015.

In 2000, it was ranked the 19th safest neighborhood in San Diego. Over the past two decades, Bay Terraces has averaged roughly a homicide a year, with 2004 accounting for an especially high four homicides out of the city's 62 total for that year, which led all city neighborhoods, followed by bordering Skyline, and nearby Mountain View and Logan Heights, which each had three apiece.

More recently in 2019, sections of Bay Terraces recorded the greatest percentage increase in violent crimes during a five-year period reviewed by the San Diego Union-Tribune. The census block, from Paradise Valley Road to just south of Shadyglade Lane along South Meadowbrook Drive saw violent crime reports increase 450 percent. For the entire five-year period, there were 51 reported violent crimes, or about one every five weeks in just those few blocks alone.

== Government ==
The neighborhood is within the 4th City Council District. The district has long been represented by Myrtle Cole since she won a special election in 2013 through 2018. It is currently represented by Henry L. Foster III, who was elected in 2024. Federally, the neighborhood is within the California's 53rd congressional district, where 14% of the voting population within the district is Asian American.

== Education ==
Bay Terraces is served primarily by San Diego Unified School District along with some charter and private schools. Schools that serve Bay Terraces students include Morse High School in neighboring Skyline, O'Farrell Community School, an independent charter school located in nearby O'Farrell Park, and Bell Middle School in South Bay Terrace.

Much like the rest of Southeast San Diego, many students in Bay Terraces have taken advantage of San Diego Unified School District's Voluntary Enrollment Exchange Program (VEEP), and have opted to be bused to high schools in San Diego's more affluent northern suburban neighborhoods. Depending on their VEEP Allied School Pattern, a high school student may be voluntarily bused to Mira Mesa High School, Mission Bay High School, Scripps Ranch High School, Serra High School, and University City High School.
