= Lincoln Park, San Diego =

- Community of San Diego
- Lincoln Park
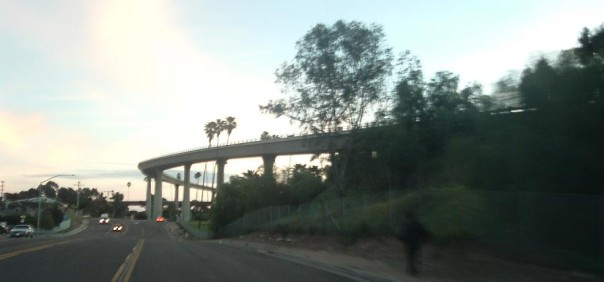
- View of the 43rd St On-Ramp of Interstate 805, from 47th Street, Lincoln Park
- Nicknames: "L.P.", "The Dip" (in reference to the densely populated stretch of Logan Ave between 47th St and Euclid Ave)
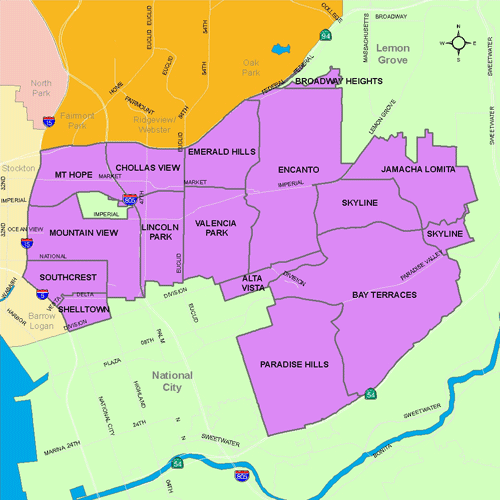
- Lincoln Park is located in the southeastern area of the city of San Diego

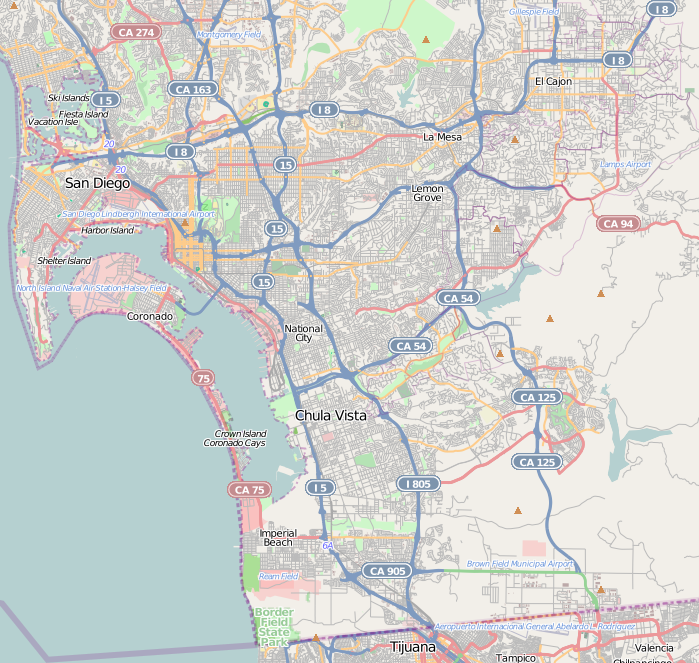
- Location within San Diego
- Coordinates: 32°42′00″N 117°05′25″W
- Country: United States of America
- State: California
- County: San Diego
- City: San Diego
- ZIP Code: 92113

Lincoln Park is an urban community in the southeastern section of San Diego, California. It is bordered by Chollas View and the San Diego Trolley to the north, Mountain View and Interstate 805 to the west, Valencia Park and Euclid Avenue to the east, and National City, California, to the south. Major thoroughfares include Imperial Avenue, Ocean View Boulevard, and Logan Avenue.

== History ==
The oldest section of Lincoln Park is the residential section between Imperial Avenue and Ocean View Boulevard. Lincoln High school is one of the High Schools Located on Imperial Ave in the heart of Lincoln. Lincoln was named after President Abraham Lincoln. California State Route 157 was planned to run through Lincoln Park as an expressway, but that concept has been abandoned.

== Demographics ==
Lincoln Park is a diverse community. Current demographics for the neighborhood are as follows: people of Hispanic heritage make up 61.0%, followed by African-American at 18.9%, then Asian at 11.8%, Other race at 4.3%, non-Hispanic Whites at 3.0%, and Mixed Race at 1.0%. It ranked near the bottom at 122 out of 125 San Diego neighborhoods in terms of lowest percentage of non-Hispanic whites, and 3 out of 125 San Diego neighborhoods in terms of total population that is non-White (roughly 97%), only to be surpassed by San Ysidro and Southcrest.

== Image ==
Lincoln Park has gone through decades of criminal trauma, including drug sales, gang violence, and homicide, often related to ongoing gang feuds with other Southeast San Diego neighborhoods, among them, the East Side Pirus of Skyline. The intersection of Euclid Ave and Imperial Ave has long been considered "The Four Corners of Death" due to the staggering number of deaths that have occurred in and around the area, as well as it serving as an unofficial boundary to several gangs territories. Of the county's estimated 88 gangs, at least 50 operate within a few square miles of this intersection.

According to data reported by the San Diego Police Department, 1,600 crimes were reported in the area from 2013 through 2019, with overall crime increasing by about 33 percent.

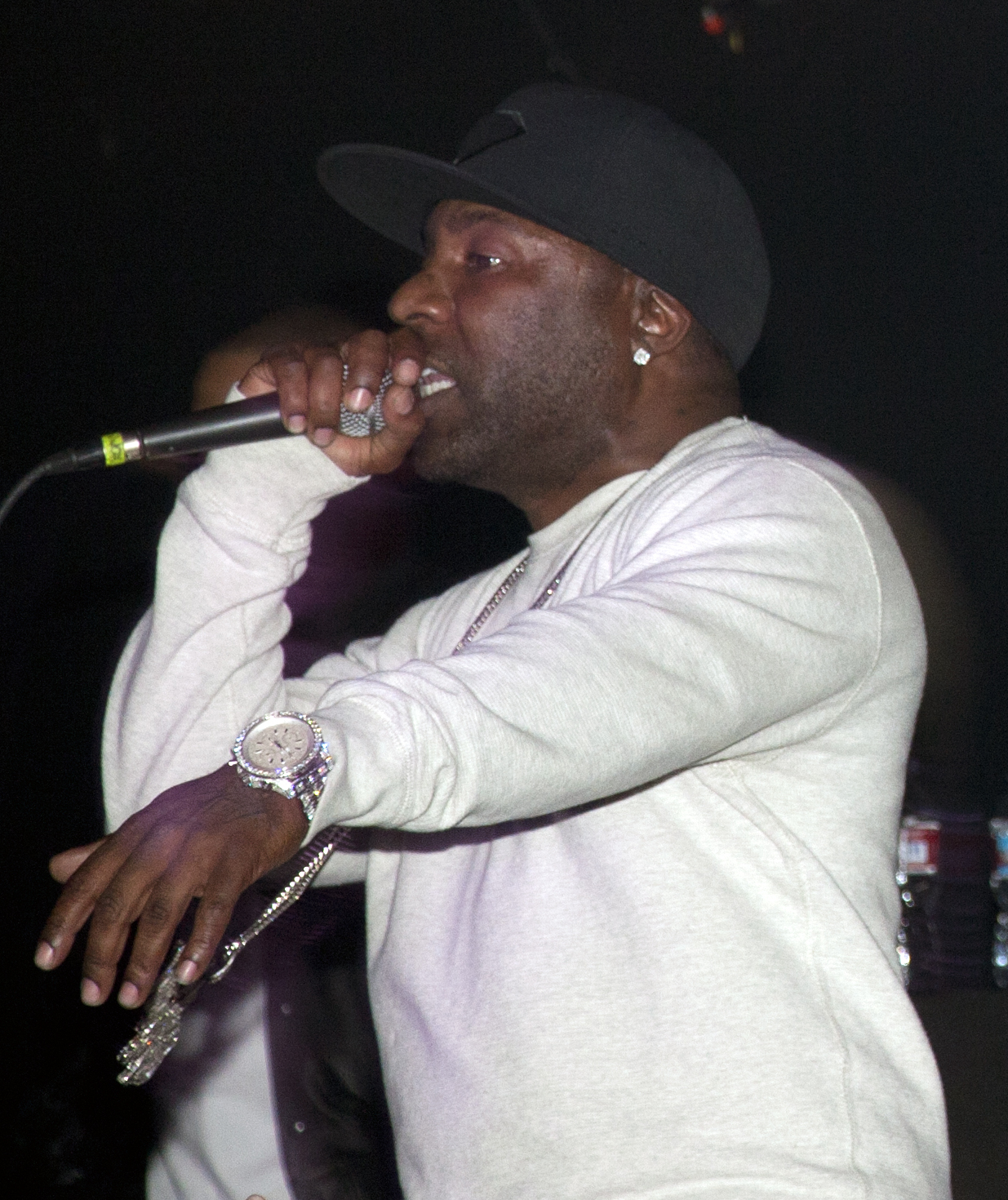
Lincoln Park native, Mitchy Slick performing in 2010

In 2010, Lincoln Park along with nearby Southeast San Diego neighborhood, Logan Heights, were featured on The History Channel's Gangland television series. The Lincoln Park Bloods were featured on the Season 7 episode titled, "Vendetta of Blood" which first aired on May 14, 2010.

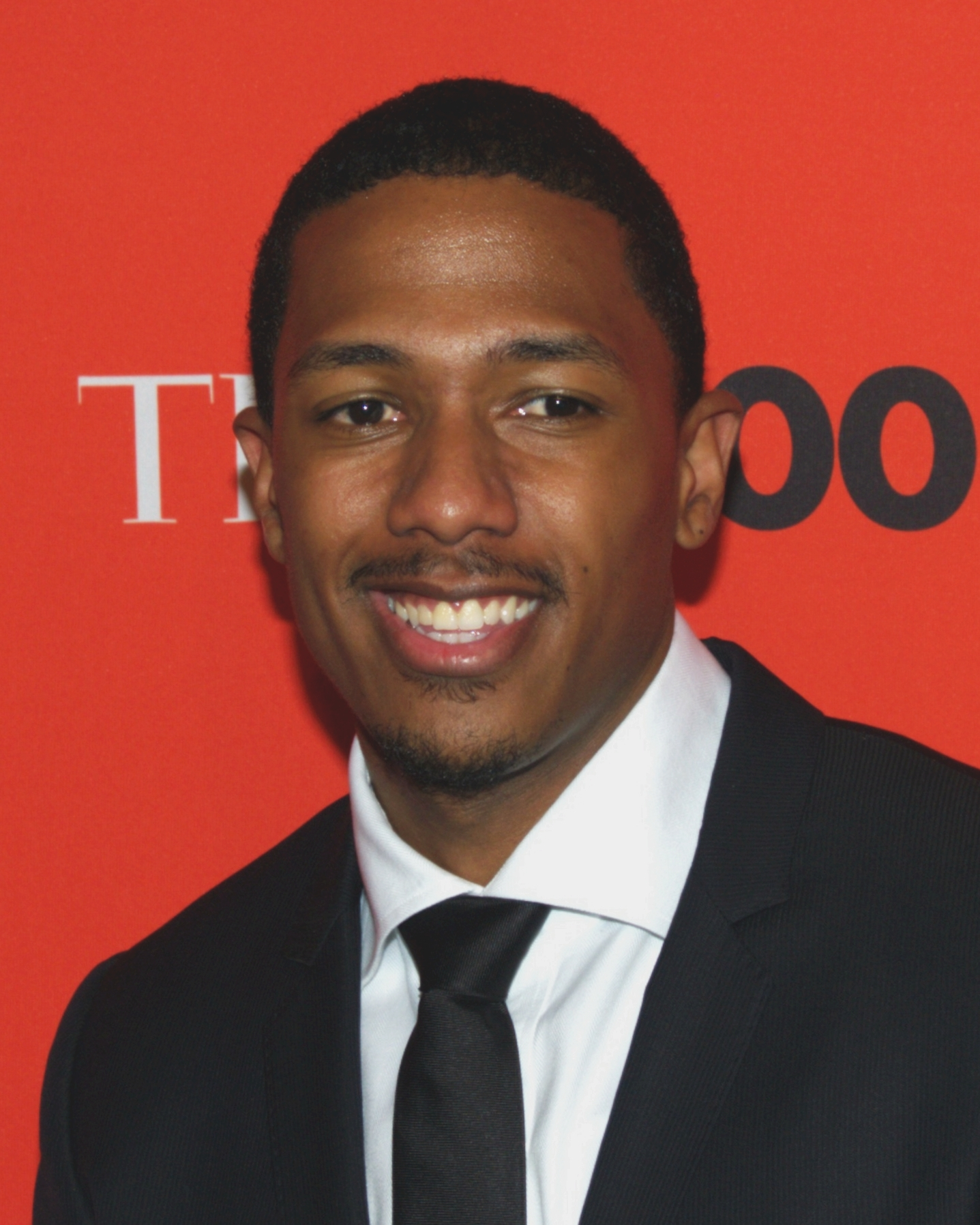
Lincoln Park native, Nick Cannon at the 2010 Time 100 Gala

One of the main centers of gang activity in Lincoln Park revolve around "The Dip", a densely populated stretch of Logan Ave between 47th St and Euclid Ave. Central to the area is the sprawling Bay Vista Housing Projects (now known as Sea Breeze Gardens) which appear extensively in the Gangland episode featuring Lincoln Park. Notable actor and rapper, Nick Cannon grew up in the neighborhood and experienced a great deal of violence in his childhood, noting his refusal to glorify that aspect of his life because he had lost a lot of friends to "senseless gang violence." Prolific Underground Hip Hop artist and fellow Lincoln Park native, Mitchy Slick, noted Nick Cannon's father as an original member of the Lincoln Park Bloods.

Rallies for peace in Lincoln Park have occurred periodically over the years, calling for the end of gang violence for all of Southeast San Diego, with more recent efforts to revitalize the area through the arts geared towards ending the negative stigma of Euclid and Imperial and reclaiming the deadly street intersection as "The Four Corners of Life."

== Landmarks and facilities ==
Chollas Creek runs through Lincoln Park.

== Education ==
Lincoln Park is served by San Diego Unified School District along with some charter and private schools. Public schools in Lincoln Park include Lincoln High School, and John F. Kennedy and Knox Elementary Schools, as well as St. Rita's Catholic School.

Much like the rest of Southeast San Diego, many students in Lincoln Park have taken advantage of San Diego Unified School District's Voluntary Enrollment Exchange Program (VEEP), and have opted to be bused to high schools in San Diego's more affluent northern suburban neighborhoods. Depending on their VEEP Allied School Pattern, a high school student may be voluntarily bused to Mira Mesa High School, Mission Bay High School, Scripps Ranch High School, Serra High School, and University City High School.

== Points of interest ==
Abraham Lincoln High School

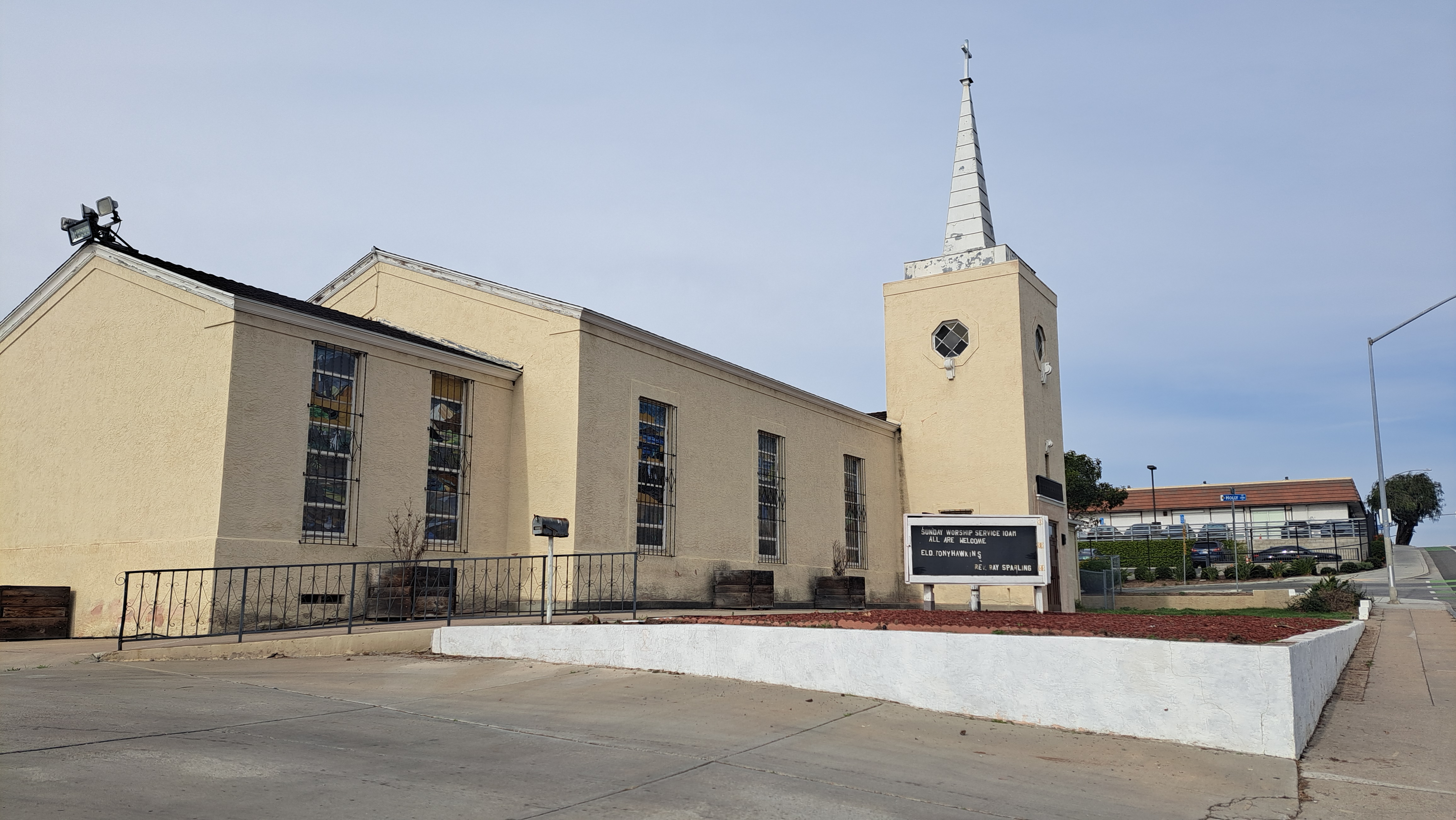
Southeast Community Presbyterian Church, 210 Euclid Avenue
