= Encanto, San Diego =

- Community of San Diego
- Encanto
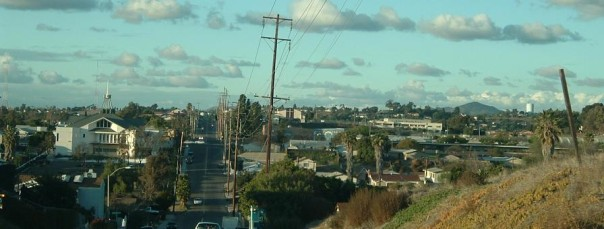
- View of Encanto from atop 61st Street, O'Farrell

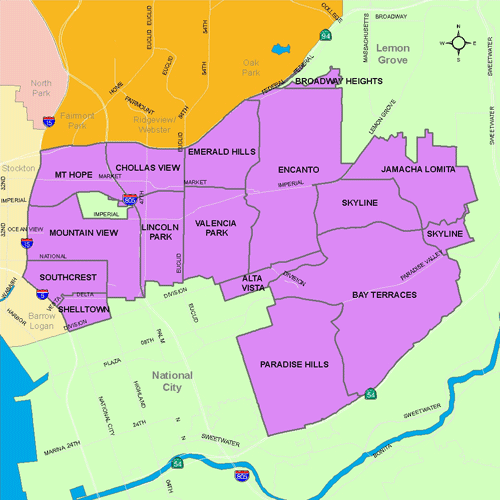
- Encanto is located in the southeastern area of the city of San Diego

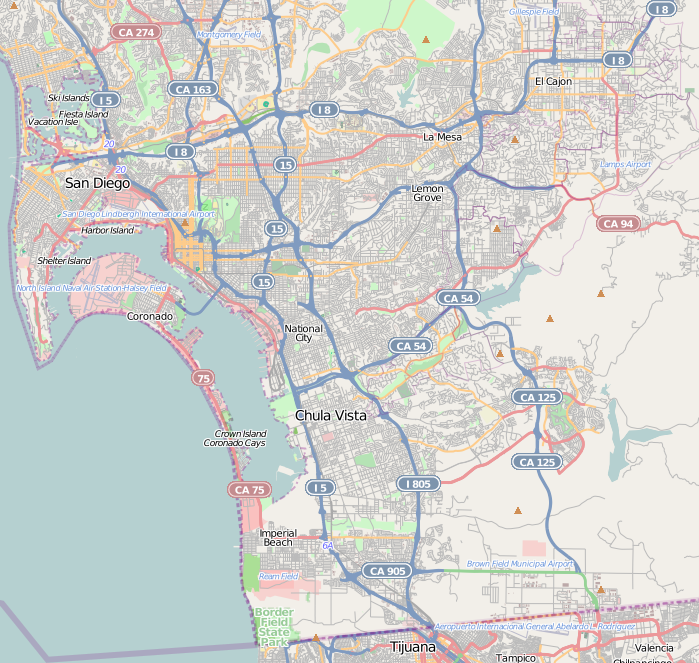
- Location within Southeast San Diego
- Coordinates: 32°42′45″N 117°03′40″W
- Country: United States of America
- State: California
- County: San Diego
- City: San Diego
- ZIP Code: 92114

Encanto (Spanish for "Charm") is a hilly urban neighborhood located in the southeastern region of San Diego, California. The neighborhood is bordered by California State Route 94 and the communities of Oak Park and Broadway Heights to the north, O'Farrell (also known as South Encanto) to the south, Emerald Hills and Valencia Park to the west and the city of Lemon Grove to the east.

== Background ==
The name Encanto usually refers to the neighborhood of Encanto, but it can also refer collectively to the neighborhoods of the Chollas Valley planning area, which consists of Alta Vista, Broadway Heights, Chollas View, Emerald Hills, Lincoln Park, O'Farrell, and Valencia Park, as well as Encanto.

The citizens' community planning group that represents these eight neighborhoods in accordance with City of San Diego Council Policy 600-24 is named the Chollas Valley Community Planning Group.

Encanto is a predominantly low-density residential community, with commercial and industrial businesses located near major streets. Encanto and the adjacent neighborhoods are going through revitalization with such programs as the Chollas Creek Enhancement Program, which focuses on open space and restoring native vegetation.

== Demographics ==
Encanto is a diverse community. Current demographics for the neighborhood are as follows: people of Hispanic heritage make up 47.6%, followed by Asian at 18.0%, then African-Americans at 17.5%, non-Hispanic Whites at 12.7%, Mixed Race at 3.8% and others at 0.4%

== Government ==
Encanto is within the 4th City Council District. District councilmember Henry L. Foster III was elected in 2024. Federally, the neighborhood is within the California's 53rd congressional district.

== Education ==
Encanto is served primarily by San Diego Unified School District along with some charter and private schools. Schools that serve O'Farrell students include the O'Farrell Charter Schools, an independent educational complex of charter school and the largest school in Encanto, along with Morse High School and Keiller Leadership Academy, a charter school partnered with the University of San Diego, both in bordering Skyline and Lincoln High School in nearby Lincoln Park.

Much like the rest of Southeast San Diego, many students in Encanto have taken advantage of San Diego Unified School District's Voluntary Enrollment Exchange Program (VEEP), and have opted to be bused to high schools in San Diego's more affluent northern suburban neighborhoods. Depending on their VEEP Allied School Pattern, a high school student may be voluntarily bused to Mira Mesa High School, Mission Bay High School, Scripps Ranch High School, Canyon Hills High School, and University City High School.
