= Morse High School (California) =

Public high school in San Diego, California, United States

Samuel F.B. Morse High School
- Morse High School

Location
- 6905 Skyline Drive; San Diego, California 92114; United States; 32°42′00″N 117°02′53″W

Information
- Established: 1962
- School board: San Diego Unified School District
- Principal: Cynthia Larkin
- Teaching staff: 76.03 (FTE)
- Grades: 9-12
- Enrollment: 1,614 (2023–2024)
- Student to teacher ratio: 21.23
- Campus: Urban
- Colors: Navy, gold, and white
- Mascot: Tiger
- Newspaper: The Morse Code
- Yearbook: The Morse Key
- Website: Morse High School
- Samuel F.B. Morse High School

Samuel F. B. Morse High School is an urban public high school in the Skyline neighborhood of southeastern San Diego, California. It serves grades 9–12 in the American K-12 education system. Morse, which serves a predominantly socioeconomically-disadvantaged student population, has produced several notable athletes among its alumni.

== History ==
Encanto Hill Farms

The area where Morse would eventually be built was once farmland owned and cultivated by the Ito family, called Encanto Hill Farms. The family grew acres of avocados, squash, string beans, and bell peppers. They were neighbors with four other Japanese families who also farmed. Development pressure and other factors led to the disappearance of Japanese American farmers south of Interstate 8.

Opening

Named after the inventor Samuel Finley Breese Morse, Morse High first opened its doors in 1962 to 1,200 freshmen, sophomores, and juniors. The Skyline neighborhood was only recently established, and it would take years for the vacant lots to be developed. The principal of the school was Thomas E. Walt. In attendance for the school's dedication in 1962 was Leila Morse, the granddaughter of Samuel F.B. Morse.

Image and perceptions in the 1990s

Morse was not immune to the gang-violence that plagued Southeast San Diego throughout the 1980s and 1990s. A highly publicized execution-style double-homicide that occurred on Morse's front lawn in 1992, in addition to the school's campus serving as a geographical locus of several major gangs in the area (for which many of its students were members of or associated with), painted Morse in an entirely negative light.

A staff member noted these points in a 1992 interview, acknowledging the perception of the school, but also naming its reality:

When people hear the name ‘Morse High School,’ they immediately think of shooting, drug activity, violence — you name it. They don’t realize that this campus is a beautiful campus; it’s a sanctuary for these students. We don’t have scandals here, because the students respect this campus — it’s theirs. And it’s the only place they can go that is free for them. We don’t have problems on this campus, not the kind people think.

Academic controversy in the early 2000s

Amid criticism of the school's declining performance after its administrative shake-up in 2002, then-superintendent Carl Cohn brought in Todd Irving, a Co-Principal from East Palo Alto High School, as Co-Principal to assist Principal Rocio Weiss for the 2006–2007 school year. Following Rocio Weiss's departure as Co-Principal in 2008, Todd Irving retained his role as Principal of Morse High School. The current principal (2018) is Cynthia Larkin.

One of the few remaining in The Southeast

When Gompers High School was converted to a grade 6-12 charter school in 2007, Morse High School and the rebuilt Lincoln High School became the only remaining public senior high schools in Southeast San Diego.

== Background ==
Morse High School for much of the 1990s and 2000s was the most populous high school in the San Diego Unified School District, peaking at 3,142 students in 2001, for a school originally designed to accommodate 1,800. Morse serves the racially and socioeconomically diverse communities of Alta Vista, Bay Terraces, Encanto, Jamacha-Lomita, Paradise Hills, and Skyline in Southeast San Diego. Morse historically had a substantial Black, Latino, and Filipino student population especially throughout the late-1980s through the mid-2000s. In 2006–2007, with an enrollment at 2,795, demographics from the California Department of Education show that 35% of the students were Filipino, followed by Hispanic-Latino (34%), Black (21%), and non-Hispanic White (4.0%). Nearly 70% of the student body was eligible for free or reduced-price lunch at the time. More current statistical data in 2019-2020 show some demographic shifts from the 2006-2007 data listed prior, where, out of a dramatically smaller 1,718 students, there was a slight increase in Latinos at 36%, followed by Filipinos at 35%, a substantial reduction in Black students at 12%, an increase in Two or more races at 8%, Asian students at 3%, Pacific Islander students at 2%, and a slight decrease in non-Hispanic White students at 2%. Students who qualify for free-reduced lunch has hovered around 80% of the school population over the past few years.

== Academics ==
Academic Performance Index place the school in schoolwide API of 640 (growth) in 2007 from 648 (base) in 2006 where 800 is the targeted California state goal. As of 2006, Morse High School has an API Statewide Rank of 3 out of 10, and an API Similar Schools Rank of 6 out of 10.

== Programs ==
=== Athletics ===
Morse offers a full range of athletic teams. These teams compete under the Morse Tigers team name against other schools in the district and in the surrounding area. Tryouts for the teams usually take place the previous semester. Morse High School is one of very few high schools to have produced two Olympic Gold Medalists (Arnie Robinson and Monique Henderson).

Fall & Winter Sports	Spring Sports	Military & Pep Squads
Fall; Football; Field Hockey; Girls & Boys Cross Country; Girls Volleyball; Soccer; Girls Golf; Girls Tennis; Boys Water Polo; Winter; Girls & Boys Basketball; Girls Water Polo; Girls & Boys Soccer; Wrestling	Boys Tennis; Football; Boys Volleyball; Girls & Boys Swimming; Boys Golf; Boys Baseball; Girls Softball; Track & Field; Badminton	Cheer; Letterettes; Twirl Flags; Drill Team; Tigerettes; Step Team; Tall Flags; All-Male; All-Female; Co-Ed Dance/Drill; APOP; JROTC; Color Guard; Drum Corps; Armed Drill Team; Unarmed Drill Team; Academic League

== Notable alumni ==
Name	Grad Class	Category	Best Known For
Archie Amerson	1993	Football	Former professional football player
Dino Babers	1979	Football Coach	Current football coach
Tommy Bennett	1991	Football	Former NFL player
Quintin Berry	2003	Baseball	Former MLB player
Marcus Brady	1997	Football	Football coach and former CFL quarterback
Rashard Cook	1995	Football	Former NFL player
Terrell Davis	N/A	Football	Pro Football Hall of Famer; transferred to Lincoln High School
David Dunn	1990	Football	Former NFL player
Rome dela Rosa	2009	Basketball	PBA (Philippine Basketball Association) player
Lonnie Ford	1997	Football	Former NFL player
Monique Henderson	2001	Track and Field	Olympic gold medalist
Sam Horn	1982	Baseball	Former MLB player
Adam Jones	2003	Baseball	Former MLB player
Faizon Love	1986	Acting	Actor and comedian
Lincoln Kennedy	1988	Football	Former NFL player
Cliff Levingston	1979	Basketball	Former NBA player
Charles Lewis	1984	Politics	Former San Diego City Council member
Pat Loika		Podcasting	Podcaster
Samuel Madden (MIT)	1994	Academia	Professor of computer science at MIT
Brandon McCoy	N/A	Basketball	Professional basketball player
Mark McLemore	1982	Baseball	Former MLB player
Rafael Peralta	1997	Military	Navy Cross recipient; casualty in the Iraq War
Arnie Robinson		Track and Field	Olympic medalist
Marcus Smith	2003	Football	Former NFL player
Josh Cinnamo	1999	Track and Field	Paralympic Medalist & World Champion

== Notable faculty ==
- Bob Mendoza, baseball player, San Diego Hall of Champions inductee, coached football, baseball and golf
