= Shelltown, San Diego =

- Community of San Diego
- Shelltown
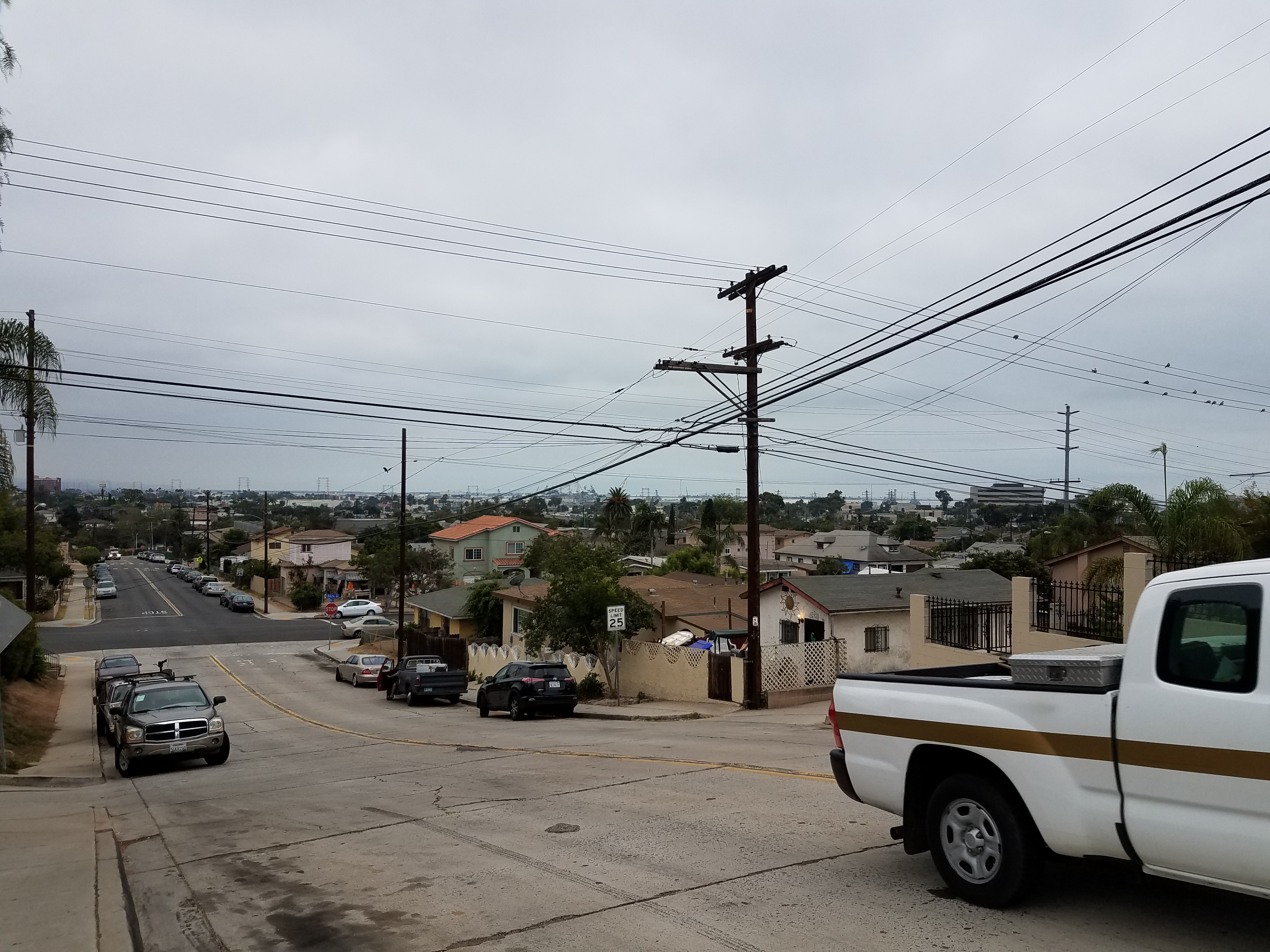
- An image looking southward on 40th Street, Naval Base San Diego in the distance

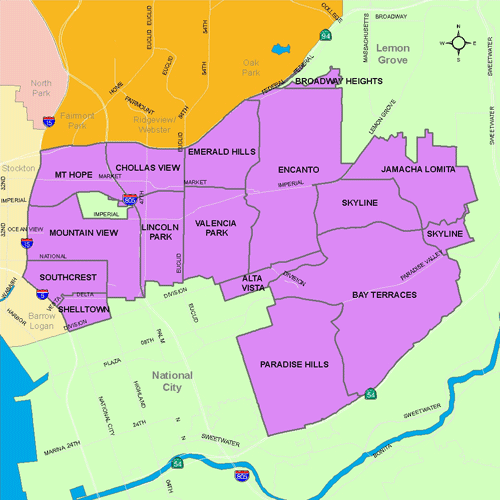
- Shelltown is located in the southeastern area of the city of San Diego

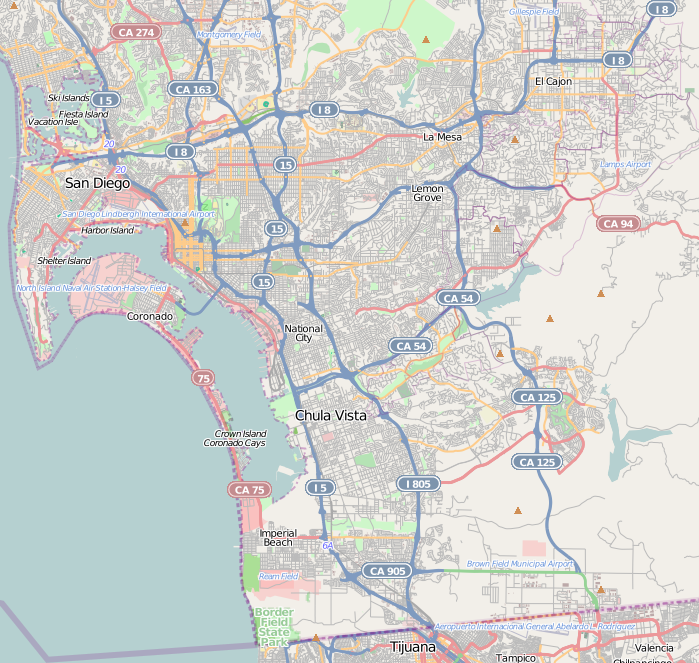
- Location within San Diego
- Coordinates: 32.6868°N 117.1074°W
- Country: United States of America
- State: California
- County: San Diego
- City: San Diego
- ZIP Code: 92113

Shelltown is a neighborhood in San Diego, California, located within Southeast San Diego. It is bordered by National City to the south, Interstate 5 and Barrio Logan to the west, 43rd Avenue (a continuation of Highland Avenue) to the east, and Gamma Court and the neighborhood of Southcrest to the north. Prior to the 1980s the northern border of Shelltown was National Ave and many residents still consider that the northern border. Naval Base San Diego, an industrial park, and some commercial buildings are located just outside the western border of Shelltown along Main Street.

== History ==
Due to the predominance of shells in the sandy soil, the neighborhood became known as "Shelltown." Located on a plateau just north and east of Naval Base San Diego, Shelltown was a favorite location of housing for many of the early naval officers. Their ships were visible from their homes and were only moments away in the event they were called to duty The majority of Shelltown consists of residential homes built between 1920 and 1969.

Mexican Americans have a long history in the area and began living in the area as early as the 1910s. With the great influx of Filipino immigrants joining the United States Navy, especially from the Vietnam War era on to the 1990s, many Filipinos inhabited the Southeast San Diego neighborhoods of Alta Vista, Bay Terraces, Paradise Hills, Shelltown, Skyline Hills, and Valencia Park, both for the relatively affordable housing prices and its close proximity to Naval Base San Diego.

== Schools ==
- Balboa Elementary School

Balboa Elementary School was recognized as one of six nationwide winners of the 2007 Intel Schools of Distinction awards, for excellence in math education in an elementary school program.

== Art ==
Shelltown contains murals on walls at three main neighborhood entrances. Local activist and muralist Mario Torero was the lead artist for the Alpha Street piece.

== Transportation ==
The area is served by the San Diego Trolley Blue Line at the Pacific Fleet station and the Route 929 bus via Main Street. The neighborhood also has quick access to Interstate 5, Interstate 15, and Interstate 805.
