= Paradise Hills, San Diego =

- Community of San Diego
- Paradise Hills
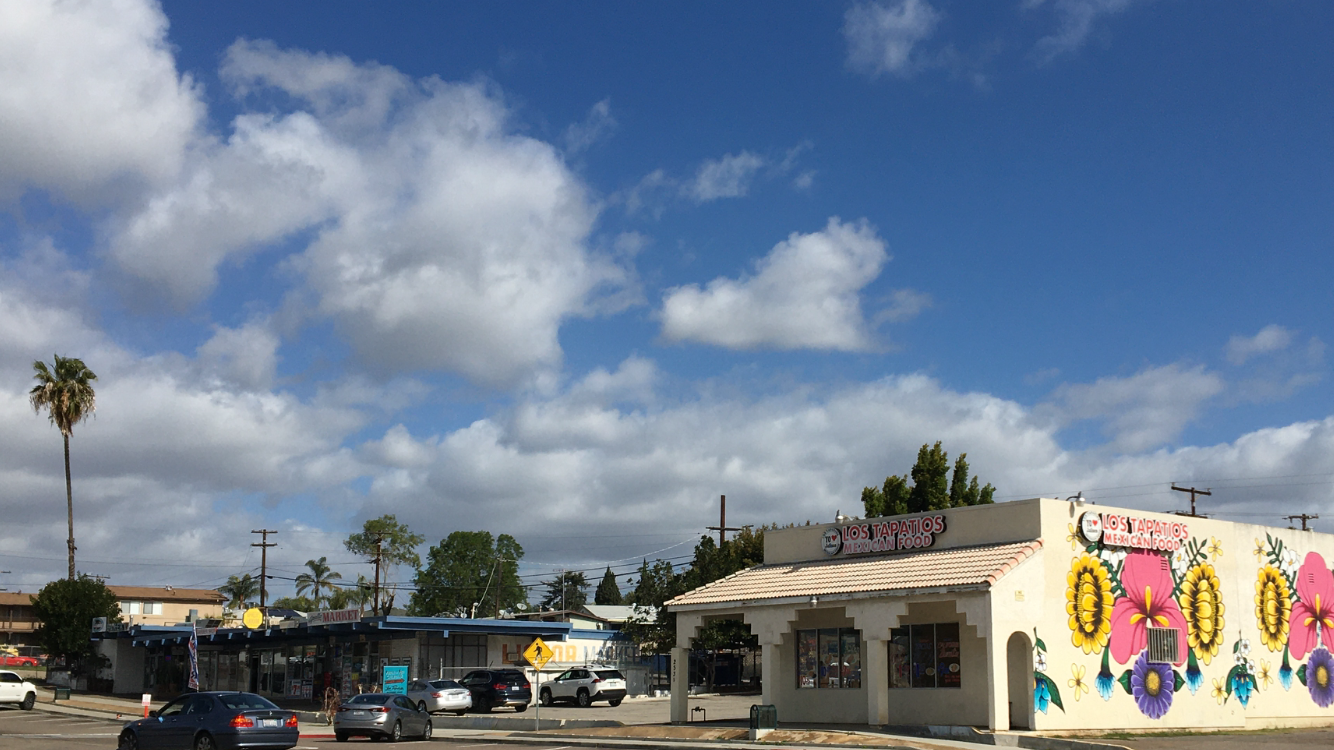
- Local businesses along Reo Drive in Paradise Hills
- Nicknames: "P.H.", "Pe Ache", "The Hills",
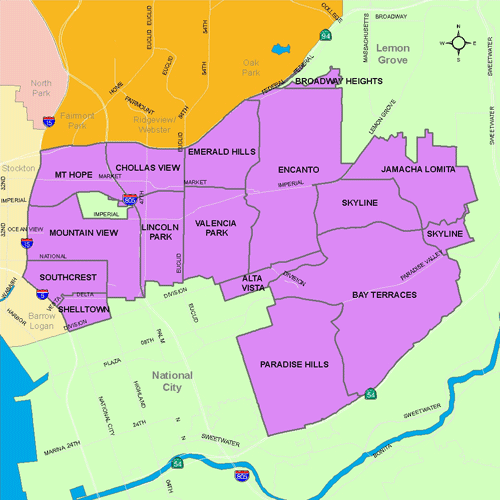
- Paradise Hills is located in the southeastern area of the city of San Diego

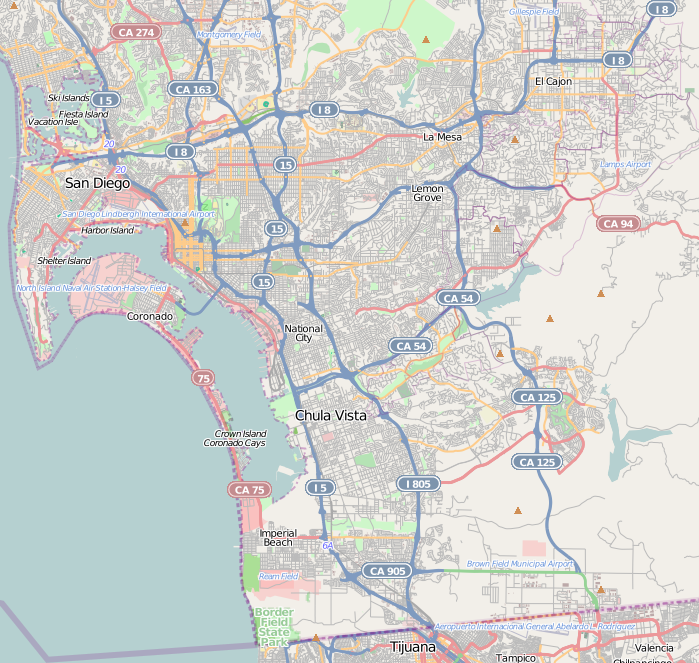
- Location within Southeast San Diego
- Coordinates: 32.676°N 117.058°W
- Country: United States of America
- State: California
- County: San Diego
- City: San Diego
- ZIP Code: 92139

Paradise Hills is an urban neighborhood in the southeastern area of the city of San Diego, California. It is an outlying neighborhood adjacent to the independent city of National City and the unincorporated communities of Lincoln Acres and certain portions of Bonita. The neighborhood is part of the Skyline-Paradise Hills Community Planning Area.

== Geography ==
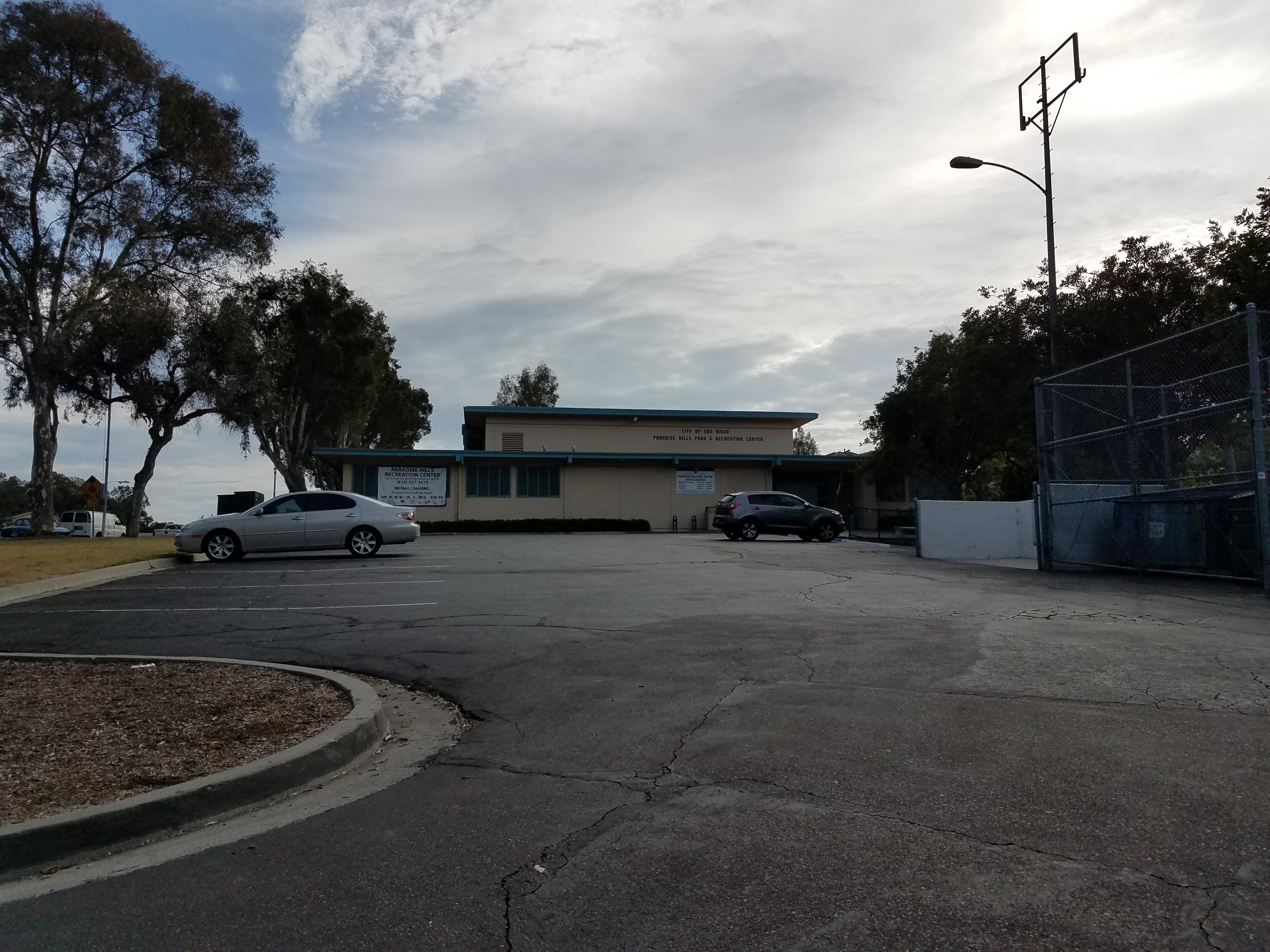
Recreation Center along Potomac Street, Paradise Hills.

Geographically, Paradise Hills encompasses the area east of Rachael Avenue (the boundary between San Diego and National City), south of Paradise Valley Road (a boundary with another San Diego neighborhood, Bay Terraces), north of State Route 54 (a boundary between San Diego and Bonita), and west of Dusk Drive and Potomac Street (another boundary with Bay Terraces). Stemming from old gang-enforced boundaries, "Paradise Hills" is sometimes incorrectly used to locate any place near the Skyline-Paradise Hills Community which includes the neighborhoods Skyline, Paradise Hills, Bay Terraces, Lomita, and the Meadowbrook Housing Project.

The Skyline-Paradise Hills Community as a whole makes up approximately 4,500 acres. Much like the surrounding neighborhoods of Bay Terraces, Skyline, and Jamacha-Lomita, Paradise Hills consists predominantly of low-density single-family homes spread across the hilly area. A major geographic feature is Paradise Valley, which runs on an east-west axis through the middle of the community and gives rise to the Paradise Creek, which flows into San Diego Bay. Paradise Hills, along with South Bay Terrace, are directly south of Paradise Valley.

== Demographics ==
Demographic statistics are only available for the wider 92139 ZIP code which includes all of Paradise Hills and a portion of neighboring Bay Terraces; in this ZIP code, people of Hispanic/Latino heritage make up 39.03%, followed by Asian and Pacific Islanders 32.87%, non-Hispanic Whites 12.80%, Blacks 10.87%, American Indian 0.11% and others 4.32%.

== Government ==
Paradise Hills is within the 4th City Council District. The district has long been represented by Myrtle Cole since she won a special election in 2013 through 2018. It is currently represented by Henry L. Foster III, who was elected in 2024. Federally, the neighborhood is within the California's 53rd congressional district.

== Education ==
Public elementary schools located in Paradise Hills are Pacific View Leadership Elementary Paradise Hills Elementary, and Perry Elementary; Penn Elementary lies on the border between Paradise Hills and Bay Terraces. Public secondary schools serving Paradise Hills residents are Bell Middle School and Morse High School (both in neighboring Bay Terraces and Skyline, respectively); San Diego School of Creative and Performing Arts (SCPA) also lies on the border between Paradise Hills and Bay Terraces. SCPA provides education from 9th through 12th grades with an added emphasis on performing arts. The largest private school in Paradise Hills, St. Michael's Catholic School, provides education from Kindergarten through 8th grade. Recreation centers in and bordering the neighborhood include Charles L. Lewis III Memorial Skate Park, Paradise Hills Recreation Center, and Penn Athletic Field.

Much like the rest of Southeast San Diego, many students in Paradise Hills have taken advantage of San Diego Unified School District's Voluntary Enrollment Exchange Program (VEEP), and have opted to be bused to high schools in San Diego's more affluent northern suburban neighborhoods. Depending on their VEEP Allied School Pattern, a high school student may be voluntarily bused to Mira Mesa High School, Mission Bay High School, Scripps Ranch High School, Serra High School, and University City High School.
