= Lomita, San Diego =

Lomita, San Diego Lomita Village,
- Community of San Diego
- Lomita
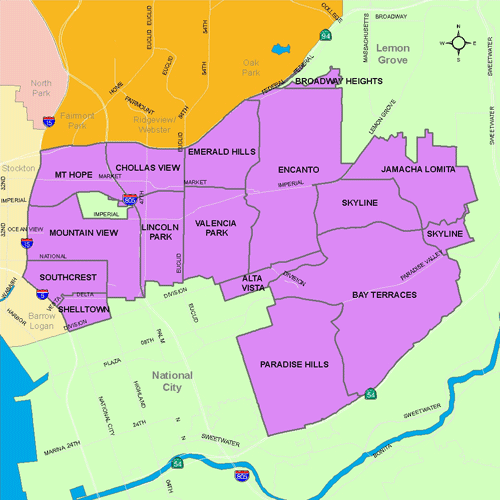
- Lomita is located in the southeastern area of the city of San Diego

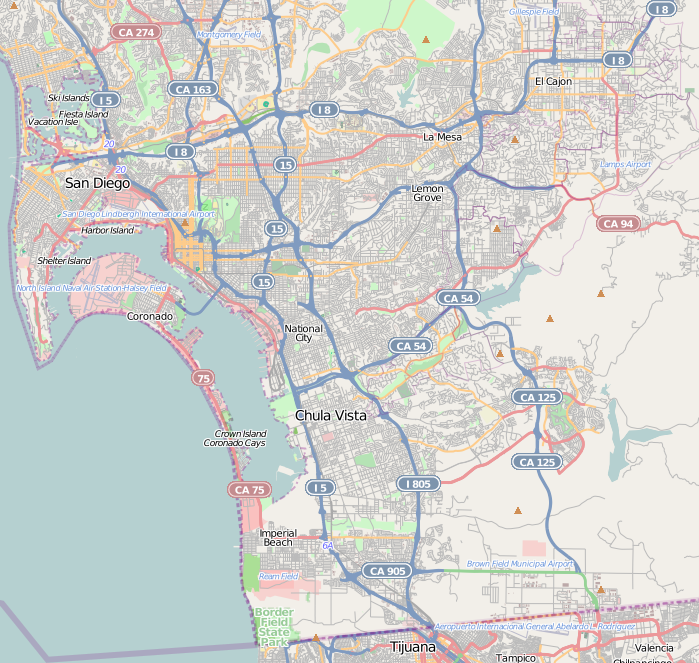
- Location within Southeast San Diego
- Coordinates: 32.7087°N 117.0286°W
- Country: United States of America
- State: California
- County: San Diego
- City: San Diego
- ZIP: 92114

Lomita (also known as Lomita Village) is an urban neighborhood in the Southeastern area of San Diego, California. It is bounded by Meadowbrook Drive, Jamacha and Skyline to the North, unincorporated La Presa to the south, Skyline to the West and Jamacha to the East. Major thoroughfares in the neighborhood include San Vicente Street, Cardiff St., and Worthington Avenue. The neighborhood is part of the Skyline-Paradise Hills Community Planning Area.

== Background ==
Lomita was largely built in the early 1950s and held a large military family population. Lomita is a largely residential district, with some small-scale commercial development on Cardiff St. a large section of the Lomita Village Shopping Center, west of Soapy Joes on Jamacha Rd. .

== Geography ==
The Skyline-Paradise Hills Community as a whole makes up approximately 4,500 acres. Much like the surrounding neighborhoods of Bay Terraces, Skyline, and Paradise Hills, Lomita consists predominantly of low-density single-family homes spread across the hilly area. A major geographic feature is Paradise Valley, which runs on an east-west axis through the middle of the community and gives rise to the Paradise Creek, which flows into San Diego Bay. Lomita, along with Jamacha, Skyline, and North Bay Terrace, are directly north and east of Paradise Valley.

== Demographics ==
Demographic statistics are only available for Lomita in conjunction with the separate neighborhood of Jamacha. Lomita is very diverse. Combined, the demographics are as follows: Hispanic-Latino are the largest group at 51.1%, followed by African-Americans at 17.7%, Asians at 13.6%, non-Hispanic Whites at 13.0%, Mixed race at 3.9%, and others at 0.7%. The census and demographic data are unreliable as it was combined with the separate neighborhood of Jamacha
