= Jeff Shoate =

American football player (born 1981)

No. 40, 28
- Position: Cornerback / Safety

Personal information
- Born: March 23, 1981 (age 45); San Diego, California, U.S.
- Listed height: 5 ft 10 in (1.78 m)
- Listed weight: 180 lb (82 kg)

Career information
- High school: Junipero Serra (San Diego)
- College: San Diego State
- NFL draft: 2004: 5th round, 152nd overall pick

Career history
- Denver Broncos (2004–2007); Baltimore Ravens (2007)*; New York Giants (2007)*; New England Patriots (2008)*; Detroit Lions (2008)*
- * Offseason or practice squad member only

Awards and highlights
- Super Bowl champion (XLII); 2× Second-team All-MW (2002, 2003)

Career NFL statistics
- Total tackles: 11
- Stats at Pro Football Reference

Jeff Shoate (born March 23, 1981) is an American former professional football player who was a cornerback in the National Football League (NFL). He was selected by the Denver Broncos in the fifth round of the 2004 NFL draft. He played college football for the San Diego State Aztecs.

Shoate was also a member of the Baltimore Ravens, New York Giants, New England Patriots and Detroit Lions. He earned a Super Bowl ring as a member of the Giants' practice squad in Super Bowl XLII.

== Early life ==
Shoate attended Junípero Serra High School in San Diego, California, where he played football as a quarterback and defensive back. Shoate also lettered in basketball and track and field as a hurdler.

== College career ==
Shoate played at the University of Montana in 1999 and San Diego State University from 2001 to 2003, recording 157 career tackles, seven interceptions, 28 pass breakups and five forced fumbles.

== Professional career ==
=== Denver Broncos ===
Shoate was selected by the Broncos in the fifth round of the 2004 NFL draft and was on the Broncos' roster for the entire 2004 season. Shoate then missed all of the 2005 season while on injured reserve before being waived by the Broncos after the 2006 preseason. He was re-signed to the Broncos' practice squad, where he spent the whole 2006 season until being re-signed to a futures contract on January 6, 2007. Shoate began the 2007 season on the Broncos' roster but was released on December 4, 2007.

=== Baltimore Ravens ===
On December 12, 2007, Shoate was signed to the Ravens' practice squad and spent the remainder of the regular season with the team.

=== New York Giants ===
The Giants signed Shoate to their practice squad on January 8, 2008, where he stayed until his contract expired following Super Bowl XLII.

=== New England Patriots ===
Shoate was signed by the Patriots on August 9, 2008, after safety Tank Williams was placed on injured reserve.

=== Detroit Lions ===
Shoate was signed to the practice squad of the Detroit Lions on December 18, 2008.
