= O'Farrell Community School =

School in San Diego, California

Coordinates: 32°42′09.09″N 117°03′55.16″W

The O'Farrell Charter Schools

Location
- 6130 Skyline Dr; San Diego, CA 92114; United States

Information
- Former names: Mabel E. O'Farrell Junior High; O'Farrell Community School
- Opened: 1959
- Campus type: Urban
- Colors: Blue, gold, white
- Slogan: Why Not The O? (athletics)
- Team name: Falcons
- Rival: Morse High School ("Battle of Skyline"); High Tech Chula Vista; Gompers Prep Academy; Tri-City Christian School (football)
- Superintendent: Cindy Wagner
- Website: www.ofarrellschool.org www.ingenuitycharter.org

The O'Farrell Charter School (known locally as OCS or simply O'Farrell) is a public charter school consisting of three schools in San Diego, California, United States. The school opened its doors in San Diego Unified School District in 1959 chosen in 1957 as Mabel E. O'Farrell Junior High. It was voted to become a charter school in 1994 and currently encompasses an O'Farrell elementary, middle and high school program, with the addition of Ingenuity Charter School.

Through the years, the O'Farrell Charter School has received numerous awards and distinctions. It was named one of America's top high schools by U.S. News & World Report six years in a row. It has also been named a school of distinction by National Center for Urban School Transformation. O'Farrell is an AVID National Demonstration School.

President Bill Clinton made a visit to San Diego in 1995 to sign the Goals 2000 education bill and to visit O'Farrell because it was a charter.

The school was mentioned in Hillary Clinton's book It Takes a Village.

== Schools within a school ==
O’Farrell operates as a community-based charter system encompassing multiple grade levels within a single campus, each designed to serve the developmental and academic needs of its students while maintaining a unified educational mission. The place's multi-school structure allows O’Farrell to provide continuity for students from kindergarten through twelfth grade while having a strong sense of community across grade levels. All schools operate on the same campus area in the Skyline–South Encanto border area.

Each O'Farrell school has a principal and vice principal, and has a separate program, teachers, and bell schedules.

In 2014, "Ingenuity Charter School, Blended Learning Independent Study Program" was added as an official part of The O'Farrell Charter Schools. Students attend in person at one of the school's resource centers at least twice per week and work independently online on the other days.

== Athletics and extracurricular activities ==
O'Farrell fields high school athletics as the O'Farrell [Charter] Falcons under the CIF San Diego Section governing body. Most sports compete in the Frontier Conference where the league may vary depending on the sport, with the exception of 11-man football, who are a member of the Sunset League in the Coastal Conference. The Falcons hold two CIF championships, both at the D5 level, which both resulted in state playoff appearances.

== Notable alumni ==
- Rosalie Hamlin, known for 1960 song "Angel Baby"
- Shirley Horton, California assemblywoman and former mayor of Chula Vista
- Tom Waits, claimed to have attended this school and remembered it as an all-black school in a 1973 interview
