= Alta Vista, San Diego =

- Community of San Diego
- Alta Vista
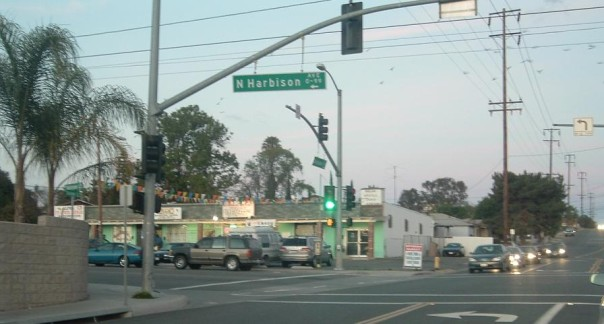
- On the intersection of N Harbison Ave and Division St, at the border of National City and Alta Vista
- Nickname: "A.V."
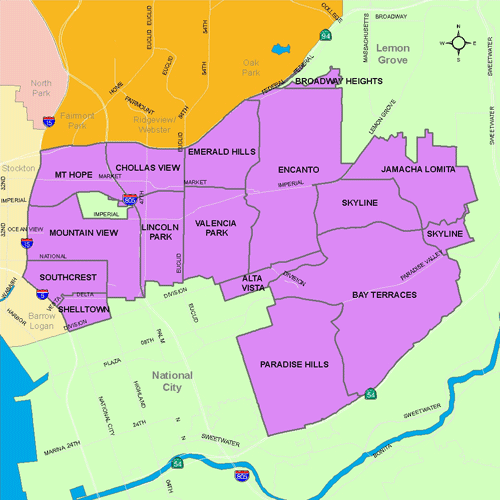
- Alta Vista is located in the southeastern area of the city of San Diego

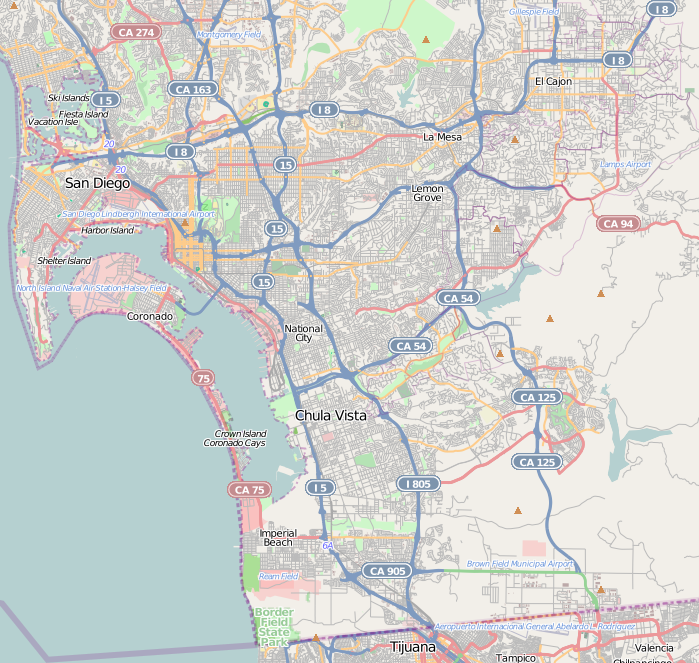
- Location within San Diego
- Coordinates: 32°41′34″N 117°4′2″W
- Country: United States of America
- State: California
- County: San Diego
- City: San Diego
- ZIP Code: 92114

Alta Vista is a small neighborhood in southeastern San Diego, California, United States. It is bordered by National City to the west, Bay Terraces to the east, Encanto and Valencia Park to the north.

With the great influx of Filipino immigrants joining the United States Navy, especially from the Vietnam War era on to the 1990s, many Filipinos inhabited the Southeast San Diego neighborhoods of Alta Vista, Bay Terraces, Paradise Hills, Shelltown, Skyline Hills, and Valencia Park, both for the relatively affordable housing prices and its close proximity to Naval Base San Diego.

== See also ==
- List of neighborhoods of San Diego, California
