= Emerald Hills, San Diego =

- Community of San Diego
- Emerald Hills
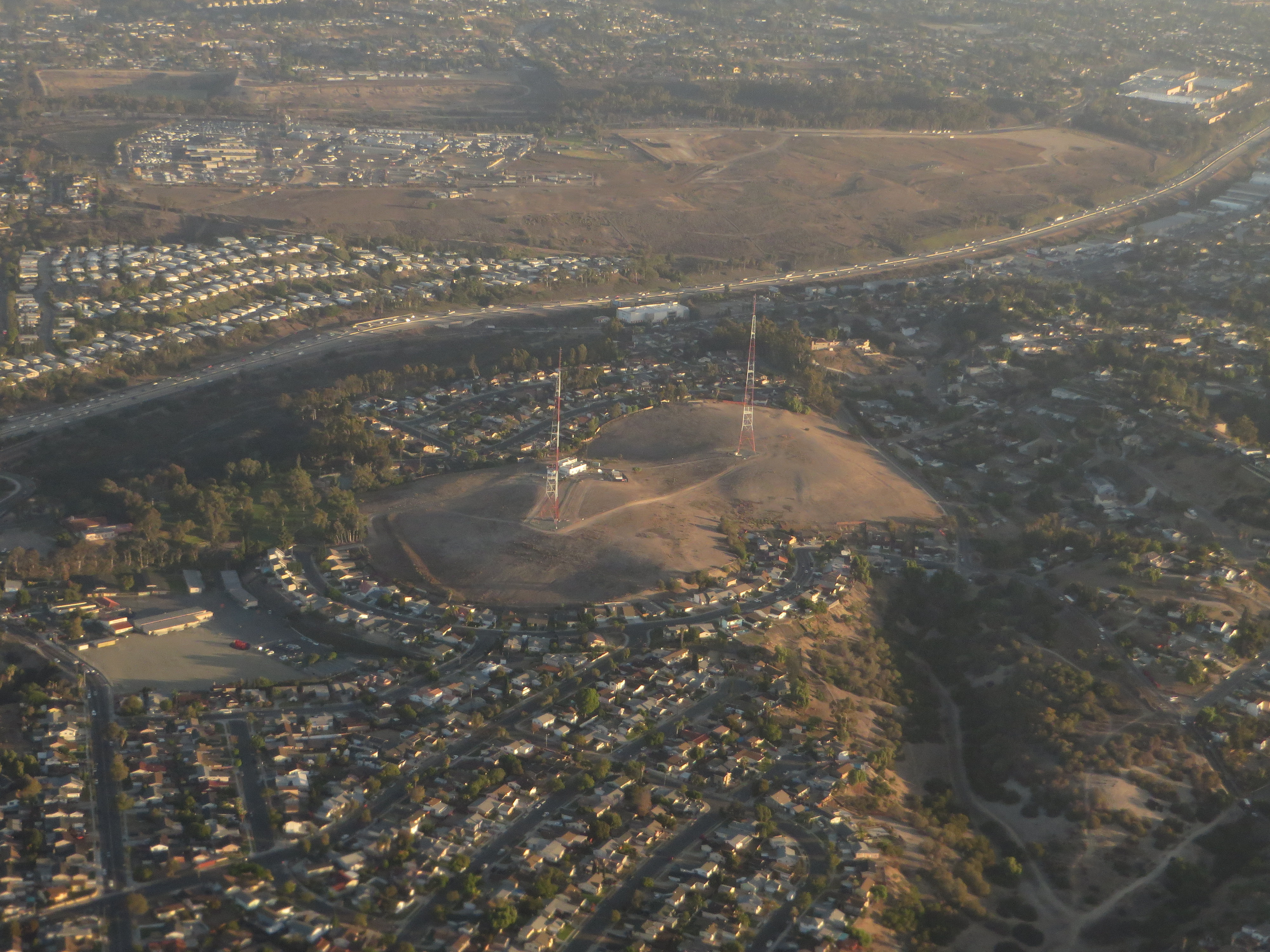
- 2014 aerial photo of Emerald Hills

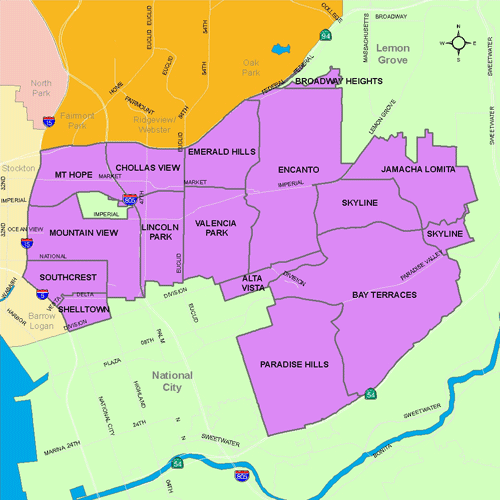
- Emerald Hills is located in the southeastern area of the city of San Diego

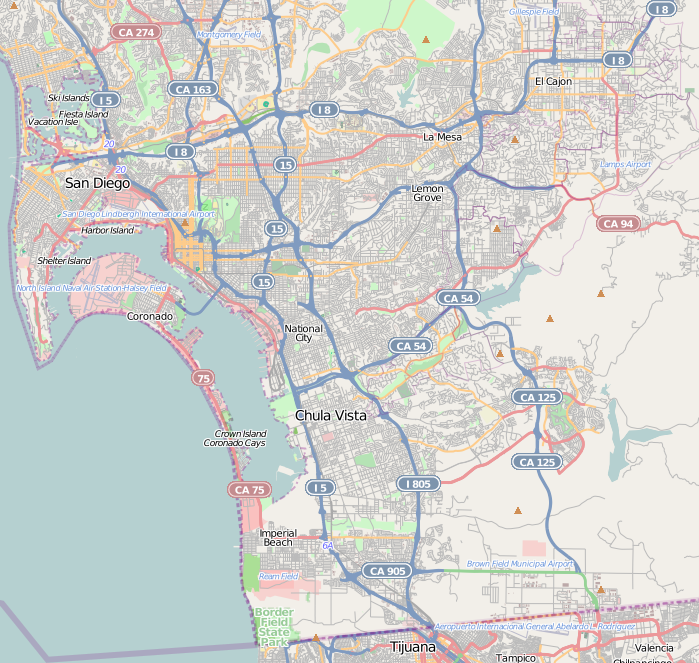
- Location within San Diego
- Coordinates: 32.7162°N 117.0765°W
- Country: United States of America
- State: California
- County: San Diego
- City: San Diego
- ZIP Code: 92114

Emerald Hills is a neighborhood in the southeastern section of San Diego, California, United States. It is bordered by Oak Park and California State Route 94 on the north, Chollas View and Euclid Avenue on the west, Encanto and Skyline Drive on the east, and Valencia Park and Market Street on the south. Major thoroughfares include Kelton Road and Roswell Street.

== History ==
The modern neighborhood is named for the Emerald Hills Country Club and Golf Course, established in the area in 1929. The club was sold in 1939 to Thomas Sharp (of Sharp Health Care) to build a transmitter site for his radio stations KFSD-AM/FM. Due to the proximity to the Chollas Naval Towers, the KFSD towers were not built until 1948. During the war Sharp continued to operate the golf course, and after the radio transmitter facility was built, Emerald Hills was lowered from an 18 hole course to a 9 hole. Sharp sold the remaining golf course to developers to be used for homes in 1958.

== Landmarks and facilities ==
The highest point in Emerald Hills holds a radio transmitter for AM 600 KOGO.The transmitter site predates the community as it was built in 1948 for AM 600 KFSD, now KOGO.

Much of Emerald Hills is open space, including Radio Canyon. A portion of Chollas Creek flows through the neighborhood.

The Malcolm X Library and Performing Arts Center is located at 5148 Market Street.

Christian Fellowship Congregational Church (UCC) is located at 1601 Kelton Road (site of the Emerald Hills Golf Clubhouse).

== Education ==
Emerald Hills is served by San Diego Unified School District. Public schools in Emerald Hills include Johnson Magnet [Elementary] School.
