= Southcrest, San Diego =

- Community of San Diego
- Southcrest
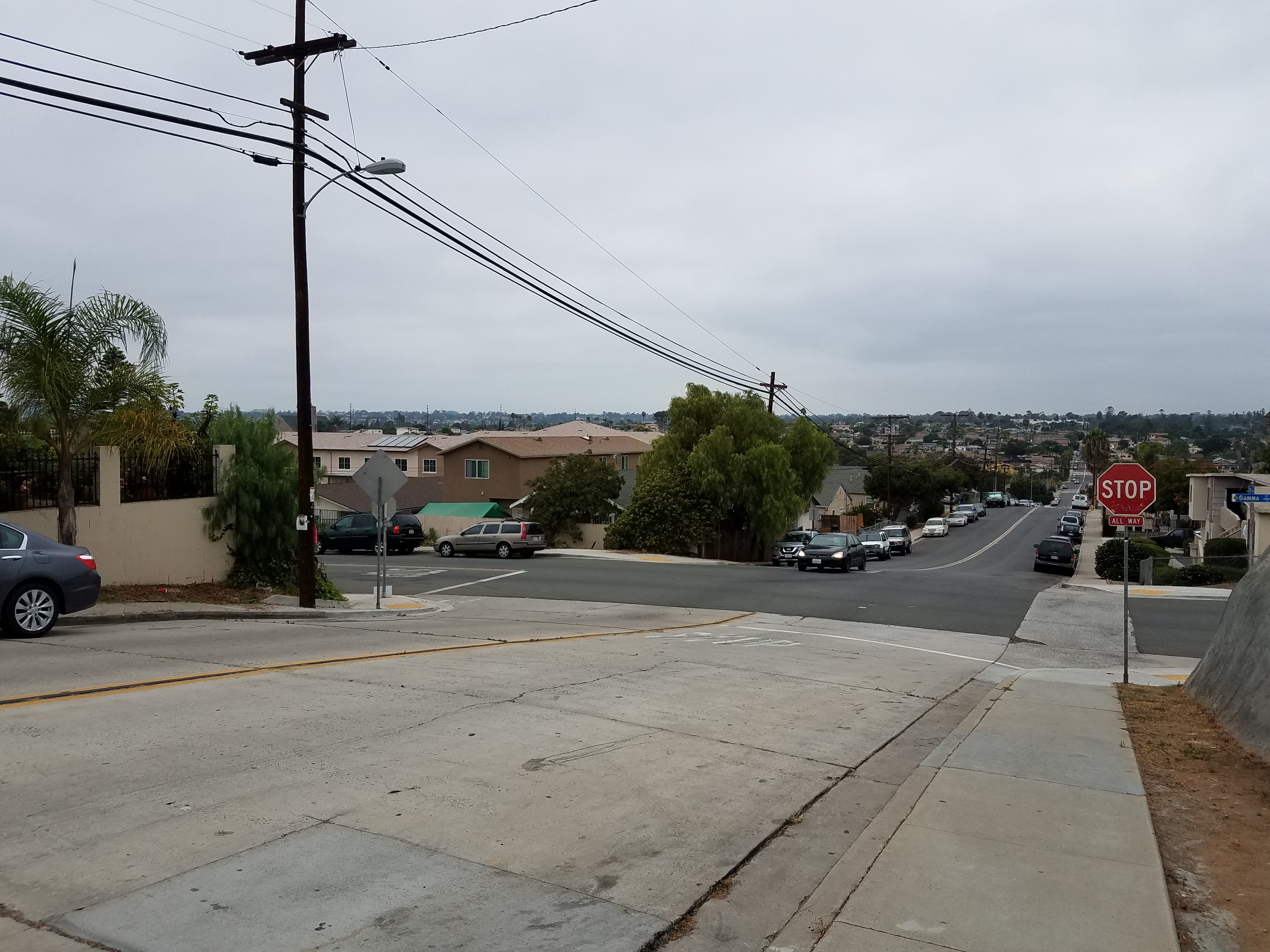
- On 40th St, looking north, towards the Southcrest neighborhood

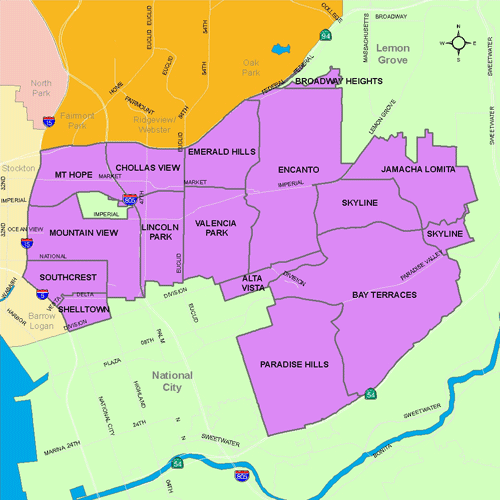
- Southcrest is located in the southeastern area of the city of San Diego

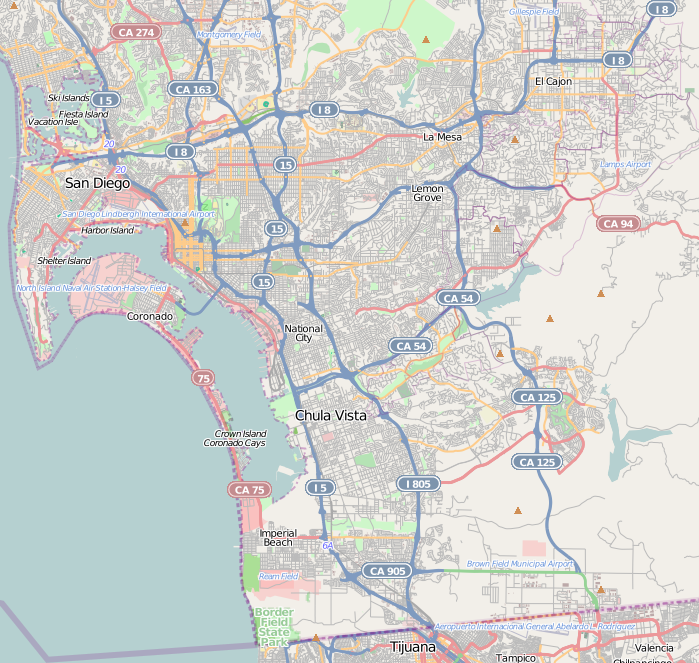
- Location within Southeast San Diego
- Coordinates: 32.6932°N 117.1132°W
- Country: United States of America
- State: California
- County: San Diego
- City: San Diego
- ZIP Code: 92113

Southcrest is an urban community in the southeastern section of San Diego, California. It is bordered by Mountain View to the north and east, Interstate 5 and the neighborhoods of Barrio Logan and Logan Heights to the west, and Shelltown to the south. Major thoroughfares include National Avenue and 40th Street.

== History ==
Prior to the 1980s the Southcrest area was part of the neighborhood Shelltown and many residents still consider this area Shelltown. The neighborhood was to have been bifurcated by a planned freeway, California State Route 252, which would have connected Interstate 805 to Interstate 5. This freeway has been deleted, and a portion of the previous right of way has been developed into the 252 Corridor Park. Many of the older homes in this area were destroyed in anticipation of the freeway and later replaced with tract housing. The area was renamed Southcrest shortly after.

== Demographics ==
Southcrest is a diverse neighborhood and home to one of the highest concentrations of Latinos in the City. Current demographics for the neighborhood are as follows: people of Hispanic/Latino heritage make up 89.5%, followed by African-Americans at 4.5%, Asian at 2.4%, non-Hispanic Whites 2.0%, and Mixed Race at 1.5%. It ranked last out of 125 San Diego neighborhoods in terms of lowest percentage of non-Hispanic whites, and 1 out of 125 San Diego neighborhoods in terms of total population that is non-White (roughly 98.0%).

== Landmarks and facilities ==
A portion of Chollas Creek runs through Southcrest on its way to San Diego Bay. 252 Corridor Park parallels much of the creekbed through the neighborhood. 252 Corridor Park has been renamed Southcrest Trails Park. San Diego's Southcrest Trails Park is located in Southcrest, within the Chollas Creek floodplain, part of the smallest watershed in San Diego and containing the highest population density. The Park itself is located south of Boston Avenue and west of South 38th Street. The park was scheduled to be completed in December 2012. In the heart of Southcrest lies the first Samoan church of any denomination in the United States. The church started in 1955 at the Naval Base, but didn't build their sanctuary until 1964. The church is located at 1345 South 45th Street.

== Government ==
Southcrest is located within the 8th City Council District, currently represented by Vivian Moreno.

== Education ==
Southcrest is served by San Diego Unified School District.
