= Jamacha, San Diego =

Jamacha Neighborhood, City of San Diego Xamca
- Community of San Diego
- HAM-ə-SHAW
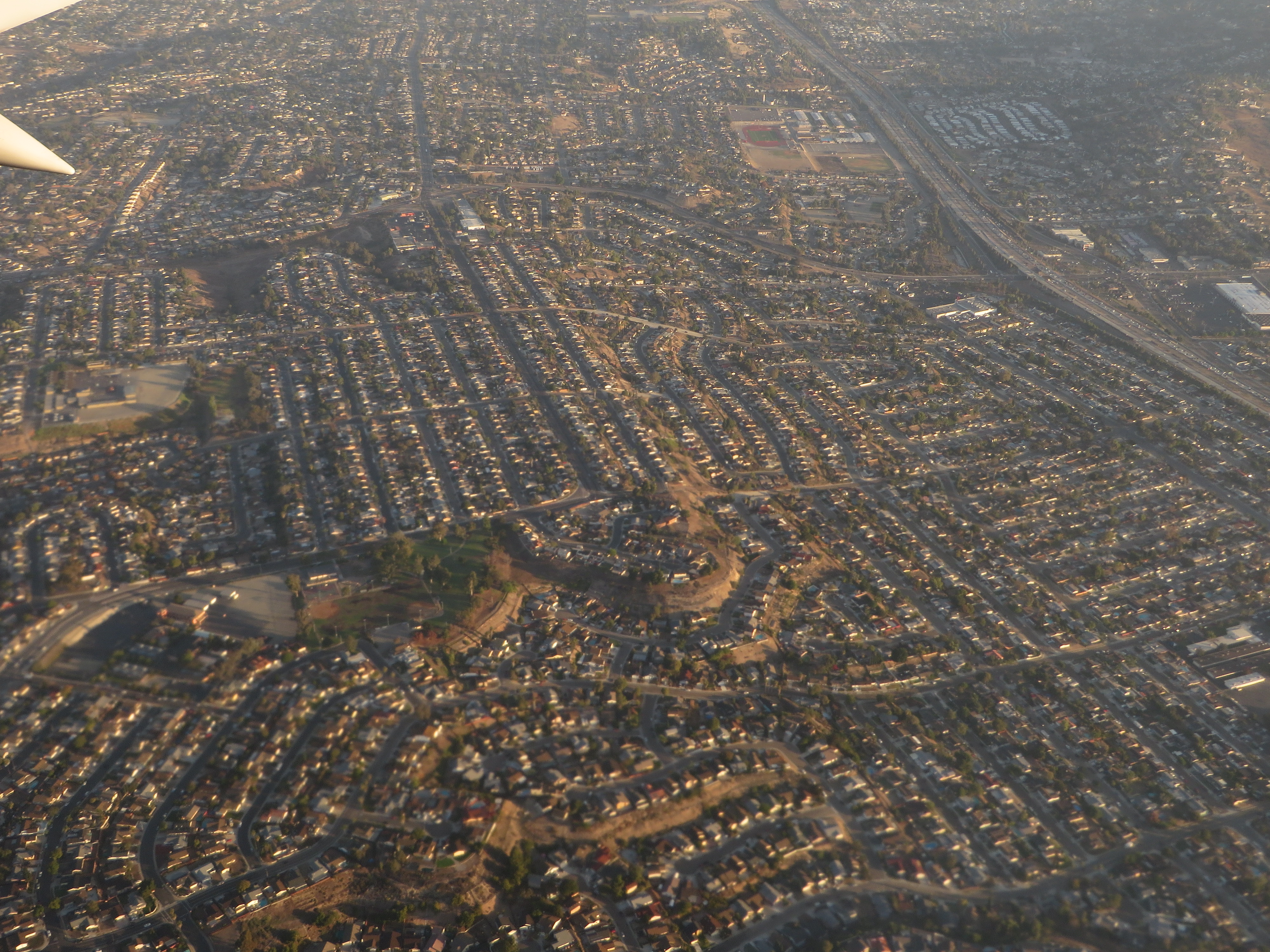
- 2014 aerial photo of the border of Jamacha Neighborhood, in the City of San Diego and Spring Valley

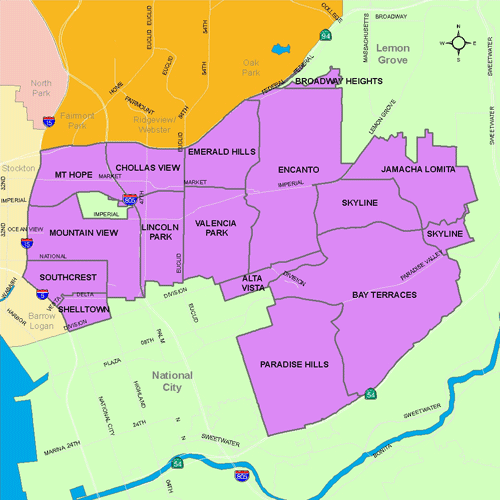
- Jamacha is located in District 4, in the City of San Diego

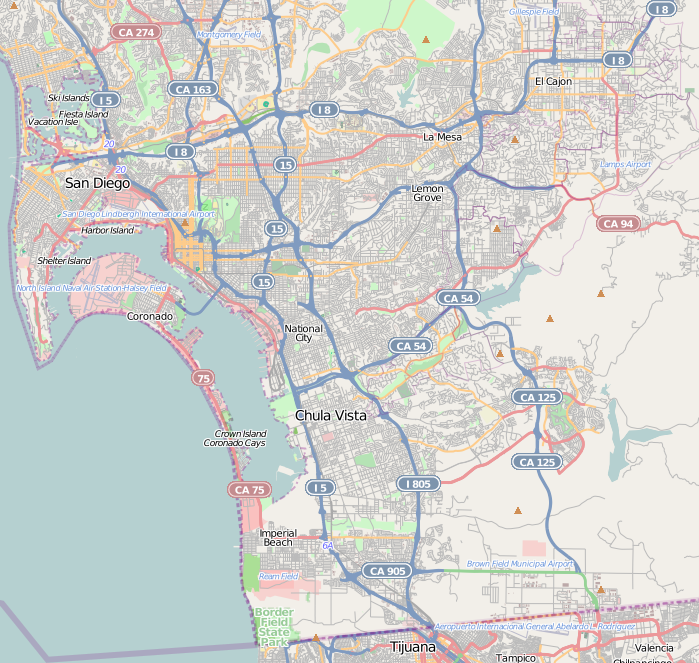
- Location within District 4, San Diego
- Coordinates: 32.7087°N 117.0286°W
- Country: United States of America
- State: California
- County: San Diego
- City: San Diego
- ZIP: 92114

Jamacha (pronounced: HAM-e-shaw) is a neighborhood in the District 4 area of San Diego, California. It is generally bounded by the city of Lemon Grove to the north, both the Lomita and Skyline communities to the south, and Encanto to the west. Major thoroughfares include Lisbon Street, Jamacha Road, Woodrow Avenue, and Imperial Ave. The neighborhood is part of the Skyline-Paradise Hills Community Planning Area.

== History ==
Jamacha is named for the Jamacha Valley and Rancho Jamacha, a Mexican land grant estate. The name was variously spelled Xamacha, Jamacha', 'Jamacho, and Gamacha until Jamacha was fixed as the official spelling in the early 20th century. The word is likely derived from a Spanish adaptation of the Kumeyaay Indian word Xamca, meaning "wild gourd. It has been confirmed that Jamacha had a rich history for the Kumeyaay people. In a memo written by Ralph Goff, Chairman of the Campo Band of Mission Indians, to Arleen Garcia-Herbst, Archeologist at Spindrift Archeological Consulting, LLC. "

== Background ==
Jamacha is a largely residential neighborhood, with mostly single-family houses, mixed with some multi-family development, Townhomes, and two apartment complexes. There is also some small-scale commercial development in the neighborhood on Imperial Ave, Lisbon St., 69th St., and the corner of Cardiff St. and Jamacha Rd.

== Geography ==
The Skyline-Paradise Hills Community as a whole make up approximately 4,500 acres. The Jamacha consists predominantly of low-density single-family homes spread across the hilly area. The major geographic features are the Jamacha Valley that runs on an east-west axis in the community and give rise to Chollas Creek that flows into San Diego Bay. The San Diego Natural History Museum published geologic mapping indicates that Jamacha is underlain by both the Pliocene-age San Diego Formation and the Eocene-age Mission Valley Formation. Both of these formations are known to be rich in fossils and have produced important paleontological resources, and it has been determined that there are 12 recorded fossil collections within a one-mile radius of Jamacha.

== Demographics ==
Jamacha is an ethnically and socially diverse family-friendly neighborhood. The demographics for Jamacha are as follows: Hispanic-Latino is the largest group, followed by African-Americans, Asians, non-Hispanic Whites, Mixed race, and others. The Census data is accurate for Census Tract, 141.02, exclusively in the Jamacha Neighborhood. However, census data is inaccurate for two tracks, 31.05, which has the odd side of Jamacha Rd. and the Jamacha Open Space System, with Chollas Creek Watershed combined with Lomita, instead of 141.02. The Census Track 31.03, has the Odd side of Lisbon St- odd side of Jamacha Rd, and 4 parcels on 68th St. and the Jamacha Open Space System, with Chollas Creek Watershed included in Skyline instead of 141.02.

Both Lomita and Skyline are legally separate neighborhoods unrelated to Jamacha per the Neighborhood Element of the Skyline-Paradise Hills Community Plan.
