= Canyon Hills High School (San Diego) =

Public high school in San Diego, California, United States

Location
- 5156 Santo Rd. San Diego, California 92124; 32°49′33″N 117°6′20″W

Information
- Type: Public school
- Established: 1976
- Principal: Erica Renfree
- Staff: 54.82 (FTE)
- Enrollment: 1,236 (2023–2024)
- Student to teacher ratio: 22.55
- Colors: Red & Black
- Mascot: Rattlers
- Website: serra.sandiegounified.org

Canyon Hills High School is a public high school in the community of Tierrasanta in San Diego, California.

== History ==
Previously known as Junipero Serra High School, it was named for Junípero Serra, a Spanish missionary who founded Mission San Diego and other settlements in what is now California. It is a traditional school in the San Diego Unified School District and is the high school for students from Tierrasanta and the adjacent Murphy Canyon military housing community. On March 9, 2021, the San Diego Unified School Board voted to change the name of the school to Canyon Hills High School.

== Mascot ==
The school mascot was Conrad the Conquistador. Following the murder of George Floyd in 2020, students started a petition to change the mascot from a conquistador, a symbol they said represented Spanish colonialism and its impact on the indigenous population. On March 9, 2021, the San Diego Unified School Board voted to change the name of the school to Canyon Hills High School, as well as the mascot to the Rattlers.

== Athletics programs ==
- football
- basketball
- field hockey
- golf
- track and field
- water polo
- baseball
- soccer
- tennis
- cross country
- cheerleading
- volleyball
- badminton
- softball
- wrestling
- lacrosse

== Rivalry ==
Canyon Hills High School's rival is Patrick Henry High School. The Field Hockey team, however, is most known for having a rivalry with Scripps Ranch High School in the Scripps Ranch community of San Diego.

== Notable alumni ==
- Cory Abbott, Professional baseball player
- Raven Bowens, actress
- Rico Curtis, Professional football player
- Jeff Shoate, Professional football player, Super Bowl Champion
- Jeff Kysar, Professional football player, Oakland Raiders
