= Scripps Ranch High School =

Public high school in San Diego, California, United States

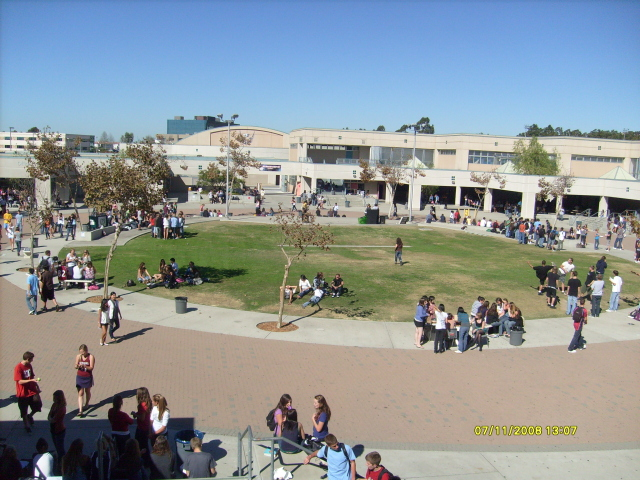
- Scripps Ranch High School in 2008

Location
- 10410 Falcon Way; San Diego, California; United States; 32.9082°N 117.1126°W

Information
- Type: Public high school
- Established: 1993
- Principal: Matthew Lawson
- Staff: 70.28 (FTE)
- Grades: 9 - 12
- Enrollment: 1,920 (2023–24)
- Average class size: 36
- Student to teacher ratio: 28.23
- Colors: Cardinal red, white and blue
- Mascot: Freddy the Falcon
- Nickname: Falcons
- Newspaper: The Falcon Flyer
- Yearbook: Legend
- Website: School website

Scripps Ranch High School (SRHS) is a public high school in northeast San Diego, California, United States, that serves the Scripps Ranch community as well as students participating in the Voluntary Enrollment Exchange Program (VEEP) busing program of San Diego Unified School District.

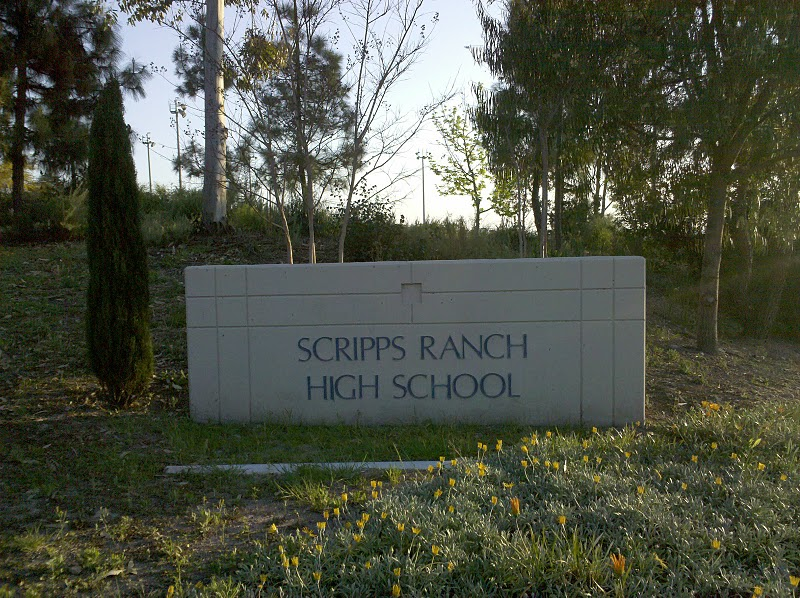
SRHS sign in front of school

== Students ==
The average class size is 36. SRHS accepts students from Thurgood Marshall Middle School, choiced-in Wangenheim Middle School, and VEEP students. There were 1,920 students enrolled in the 2023-2024 school year.

=== Diversity ===
The ethnic breakdown as of 2023-24 was 36.1% White, 28.8% Asian, 14.5% Hispanic, 12.9% "Two or More Races", 5.5% Filipino, 2.0% African American, 0.1% American Indian or Alaska Native, and 0.1% Not Reported.

== Academics ==
=== Standardized test scores ===
For 2012, the base API score was 900, growing from a score of 883. Based on the 2011 API results, Scripps Ranch was a top performing comprehensive high school in the San Diego Unified School District, and the highest performing comprehensive high school in San Diego County, surpassing several fellow schools.

=== Advanced Placement and honors ===
SRHS offers a variety of AP as well as honors classes in the sciences, world languages, arts, social studies and English. AP and honors classes are weighted on a 5-point scale.

=== Language programs ===
SRHS offers several language programs including Spanish, American Sign Language (ASL), and Japanese. AP level classes are available for Spanish. Honors is available for fourth year Japanese. The world language program has a blog showing the central information and events going on in SRHS language department. All classes are available for 2-year study or more.

=== College attendance ===
95% of students attend some form of post-secondary school education. More specifically, according to the school principal, "60% of our students will be attending a 4-year university, 35% are going to a 2-year college and 5% will be serving their country in the military or pursuing other post high school options."

=== Student Accomplishments ===
Past student accomplishments include an Intel International Science and Engineering Fair award winner, National Merit Scholarship winner, 102 AP Scholars, and one Jeopardy! contestant.

== Athletics ==
=== Seasonal sports ===
- Fall: cross country, field hockey, American football, marching band & color guard, women's tennis, women's golf, women's volleyball, men's water polo
- Winter: roller hockey, men's basketball, women's basketball, men's soccer, women's soccer, women's water polo, wrestling
- Spring: badminton, baseball, golf, men's tennis, softball, swimming and diving, men's lacrosse, women's lacrosse, track, men's volleyball
- Non-seasonal: cheerleading, dance team

== Media ==
Scripps Ranch High School's student-produced newspaper is the Falcon Flyer and its yearbook is known as the Legend. It also has a yearly literary magazine, The Ascent. Scripps Ranch High School also has a weekly video broadcast for telling about school events, known as the Falcon Five Broadcast.

== Controversies ==
=== Valedictorian speech ===
In 2015, the administration came under fire after the valedictorian was denied the right to speak at graduation for the Class of 2015. The decision resulted from an 18-year-old policy in which "all interested students audition for the right to be one of the commencement speakers - even the valedictorian", as reported by NBC. The issue resulted in students putting together an online petition which gathered over 700 signatures asserting that she should be allowed to address her classmates as literally defined in the word "valedictorian".

=== AP Test Scores Cancellation ===
On June 30, 2017, school officials announced that due to seating violations, 540 students from Scripps Ranch need to retake their Advanced Placement exams in AP Calculus, AP Biology, AP United States History and five other subjects. A total of 800 exams had been cancelled because of the test administrators' failure to ensure proper distance between students as ordained by the College Board. Hundreds of students and parents have filed complaints toward San Diego Unified, and the school board voted on July 6 to file a temporary restraining order on the College Board's decision.

=== SRHS "Twerk Team" ===
In mid 2013, 33 students were suspended after a video showing students twerking was uploaded to YouTube. The students originally had their senior prom and graduation walking rights taken away from them as part of the suspension. Public outcry quickly followed the news of the student suspensions with the hashtag #FreeTheTwerkTeam.

== Notable alumni ==
Name	Grad Class	Category	Best Known For
Nicole Ahsinger		Athletics	U.S. Olympian in trampoline gymnastics (2016 and 2020 Summer Olympics)
Adam Brody		Entertainment	Actor
John Famiglietti		Entertainment	Bassist and Producer of Health (band), pioneers of the Cum Metal genre
Blakely McHugh		Entertainment	Two time Emmy nominated Journalist
Kyle Mooney		Entertainment	Cast member on Saturday Night Live
Keely Moy		Sports	Professional ice hockey player for HC Lugano and 2022 Olympian for Switzerland in women's ice hockey
Tyler Moy		Sports	Professional ice hockey player for Genève-Servette HC in the Swiss League
Chad Ruhwedel		Sports	Former professional ice hockey player for Buffalo Sabres and Pittsburgh Penguins
Xander Schauffele		Sports	Professional golfer, winner of the 2017 Tour Championship, 2024 PGA Championship, and 2024 Open Championship
Savannah Sellers		Journalist	co-host of Morning News Now on NBC News Now
Sam Staab		Sports	National Women's Soccer League player for Chicago Red Stars
Marni von Wilpert		Politics	San Diego City Council member
Kellen Winslow II		Sports	Former professional football player for Cleveland Browns, New England Patriots, New York Jets, and Tampa Bay Buccaneers
