= 2022 San Diego City Council election =

- November 8, 2022

4 of the 9 seats on the San Diego City Council
	Majority party	Minority party
Party	Democratic	Republican
Seats before	8	1
Seats after	9	0
Seat change	▲1	▼1
Council President before election
Sean Elo-Rivera
Democratic
Elected Council President
Sean Elo-Rivera
Democratic

The 2022 San Diego City Council election was held on November 8, 2022. The primary election was held on June 7, 2022. Four of the nine seats of the San Diego City Council were contested.

Municipal elections in California are officially non-partisan, although most members do identify a party preference. A two-round system was used for the election, starting with a primary in June followed by a runoff in November between the top-two candidates in each district.

The election resulted in a 9-0 Democratic majority on the city council for the first time in San Diego history.

== Campaign ==
The even-numbered districts 2, 4, 6, and 8 were up for election in 2022. It was the first city council election to use the newly redrawn districts following the 2020 Census.

Incumbents Jennifer Campbell (District 2), Monica Montgomery Steppe (District 4), and Vivian Moreno (District 8) stood for reelection. Chris Cate (District 6) was ineligible to run for re-election due to term limits. Republicans were considered vulnerable to lose their last seat, District 6, since it leaned more Democratic following redistricting. All three eligible incumbents won re-election, while Democrat Kent Lee flipped District 6 from Republican to Democratic control, cementing a 9-0 Democratic majority.

== Results ==
=== District 2 ===
District 2 consisted of the communities of Bay Ho/Bay Park/Morena, Midway/North Bay, Mission Beach, Ocean Beach, Pacific Beach, and Point Loma.

Democratic incumbent Jennifer Campbell had faced a recall campaign in 2021 over her stance on the city's regulation of vacation rentals and her support of an exemption to the 30-foot height limit in San Diego's Midway District. Recall proponents claimed that Campbell had made decisions contradictory to promises she had made to constituents during the election. The recall effort ultimately failed to collect enough signatures to qualify for the ballot, but prompted a large number of candidates to challenge Campbell in the 2022 election.

Democratic incumbent Jennifer Campbell and Linda Lukacs, a retired Republican dentist, defeated four Democratic challengers and advanced from the primary on June 7, 2022. Campbell went on to defeat Lukacs 56.% to 43.5% in the general election.

2022 San Diego City Council District 2 election
Primary election
Party	Candidate	Votes	%
Democratic	Jennifer Campbell (incumbent)	10,832	29.8
Republican	Linda Lukacs	9,211	25.4
Democratic	Lori Saldaña	6,603	18.2
Democratic	Joel Day	5,130	14.1
Democratic	Mandy Havlik	3,027	8.3
Democratic	Dan Smiechowski	1,532	4.2
Total votes		36,335	100.0
General election
Democratic	Jennifer Campbell	28,379	56.5
Republican	Linda Lukacs	21,854	43.5
Total votes		50,233	100.0
Democratic hold			

=== District 4 ===
District 4 consisted of the communities of Alta Vista, Broadway Heights, Chollas View, Emerald Hills, Encanto, Greater Skyline Hills, Jamacha, Lincoln Park, Lomita Village, North Bay Terrace, Oak Park, O'Farrell, Paradise Hills, Redwood Village, Rolando Park, South Bay Terrace, Valencia Park, and Webster.

Democratic incumbent Monica Montgomery Steppe and Gloria Evangelista, a Republican dietician, advanced from the primary on June 7, 2022. Montgomery Steppe went on to defeat Evangelista 68.8% to 31.2% in the general election.

2022 San Diego City Council District 4 election
Primary election
Party	Candidate	Votes	%
Democratic	Monica Montgomery Steppe (incumbent)	12,110	71.1
Republican	Gloria Evangelista	3,683	21.6
Democratic	Tylisa D. Suseberry	1,228	7.2
Total votes		17,021	100.0
General election
Democratic	Monica Montgomery Steppe	17,878	68.8
Republican	Gloria Evangelista	8,112	31.2
Total votes		25,990	100.0
Democratic hold			

=== District 6 ===
District 6 consisted of the communities of Clairemont Mesa, Kearny Mesa, Mira Mesa, Mission Valley, North Clairemont, and Rancho Peñasquitos.

Incumbent Chris Cate was ineligible for re-election due to term limits. Kent Lee and Tommy Hough, both Democrats, advanced from the primary on June 7, 2022. Lee went on to defeat Hough 60.5% to 39.5%.

2022 San Diego City Council District 6 election
Primary election
Party	Candidate	Votes	%
Democratic	Kent Lee	10,390	40.7
Democratic	Tommy Hough	9,461	37.1
Republican	Jane L. Glasson	5,657	22.2
Total votes		25,508	100.0
General election
Democratic	Kent Lee	22,040	60.5
Democratic	Tommy Hough	14,380	39.5
Total votes		36,420	100.0
Democratic gain from Republican			

=== District 8 ===
District 8 consisted of the southern communities of San Diego and those along the Mexico–United States border, including the communities of Barrio Logan, Egger Highlands, Grant Hill, Logan Heights, Memorial, Nestor, Ocean View Hills, Otay Mesa West, Otay Mesa East, San Ysidro, Sherman Heights, Stockton, and Tijuana River Valley.

Incumbent Vivian Moreno and Antonio Martinez, both Democrats, advanced from the primary on June 7, 2022. Moreno went on to defeat Martinez 63.3% to 36.7%.

2022 San Diego City Council District 8 election
Primary election
Party	Candidate	Votes	%
Democratic	Vivian Moreno (incumbent)	8,432	63.4
Democratic	Antonio Martinez	4,873	36.6
Total votes		13,305	100.0
General election
Democratic	Vivian Moreno	13,194	63.3
Democratic	Antonio Martinez	7,651	36.7
Total votes		20,845	100.0
Democratic hold			

== Council president ==
On December 10, 2022, the new council was sworn in. The council voted to re-appoint Sean Elo-Rivera as council president, who had served in that role since 2021.
