= 2018 San Diego City Council election =

- November 6, 2018

4 of the 9 seats on the San Diego City Council
	Majority party	Minority party
Party	Democratic	Republican
Seats before	5	4
Seats after	6	3
Seat change	▲1	▼1
Council President before election
Myrtle Cole
Democratic
Elected Council President
Georgette Gomez
Democratic

The 2018 San Diego City Council election occurred on November 6, 2018. The primary election was held June 5, 2018. Four of the nine seats of the San Diego City Council were contested.

Municipal elections in California are officially non-partisan, although most members do identify a party preference. A two-round system was used for the election, starting with a primary in June followed by a runoff in November between the top-two candidates in each district.

The election resulted in a net gain of one seat for self-identified Democrats. This gave Democrats a two-thirds majority on the City Council, allowing them to override vetoes by Republican mayor Kevin Faulconer on issues that divide along partisan lines. Additionally two incumbent council members were defeated, marking the first time any incumbent had lost a City Council election in the city since 1992.

== Campaign ==
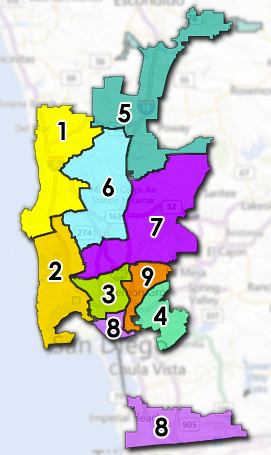
Council districts used for the 2018 election

The even-numbered districts 2, 4, 6, and 8 were up for election in 2018. It was the first City Council election using the new rules that requires a runoff in November between the top-two candidates in the June primary whether or not any of the candidates get a majority of the vote.

Incumbents Lorie Zapf (District 2), Myrtle Cole (District 4), and Chris Cate (District 6) stood for reelection. David Alvarez (District 8) was ineligible to run due to term limits. Republicans were considered more vulnerable to lose seats in the election due to the two Republican-held seats, Districts 2 and 6, being considered swing districts while the two Democrat-held seats, Districts 4 and 8, were considered safe districts. However, incumbents historically had not lost reelection to the San Diego City Council, and both Zapf and Cate had raised far more money than their challengers as of February 2018.

== Results ==
=== District 2 ===
District 2 consisted of the communities of Bay Ho/Bay Park/Morena, Midway/North Bay, Mission Beach, Ocean Beach, Pacific Beach, and Point Loma. A large field of seven challengers qualified to run against incumbent council member Lorie Zapf. In the June primary, Zapf advanced to the general election to face retired doctor Jennifer Campbell. Campbell was elected to the City Council in the November general election, making Zapf one of the first incumbents on the City Council to lose a reelection bid since 1992.

San Diego City Council District 2 election, 2018
Primary election
Party	Candidate	Votes	%
Republican	Lorie Zapf	13,786	42.85
Democratic	Jennifer Campbell	6,871	21.36
Democratic	Bryan Pease	6,375	19.81
Democratic	Jordan Beane	3,190	9.92
Democratic	Daniel Smiechowski	847	2.63
Republican	Kevin Melton	737	2.29
Nonpartisan	Randy Hahn	367	1.14
Total votes		32,173	100
General election
Democratic	Jennifer Campbell	32,439	57.97
Republican	Lorie Zapf	23,516	42.03
Total votes		55,955	100

=== District 4 ===
District 4 consisted of the communities of Alta Vista, Broadway Heights, Chollas View, Emerald Hills, Encanto, Greater Skyline Hills, Jamacha, Lincoln Park, Lomita Village, North Bay Terrace, Oak Park, O'Farrell, Paradise Hills, Redwood Village, Rolando Park, South Bay Terrace, Valencia Park, and Webster. Three challengers qualified to run against incumbent Council President Myrtle Cole, all from her own party. In the June primary, Cole advanced to the general election to face civil rights lawyer Monica Montgomery. Montgomery was elected to the City Council in the November general election, making Cole one of the first incumbents on the City Council to lose a reelection bid since 1992. This did not impact the partisan composition of the City Council, since both Cole and Montgomery are Democrats.

San Diego City Council District 4 election, 2018
Primary election
Party	Candidate	Votes	%
Democratic	Monica Montgomery	7,424	38.88
Democratic	Myrtle Cole	7,418	38.85
Democratic	Tony Villafranca	3,273	17.14
Democratic	Neal Arthur	978	5.12
Total votes		19,093	100
General election
Democratic	Monica Montgomery	20,180	57.74
Democratic	Myrtle Cole	14,769	42.26
Total votes		34,949	100

=== District 6 ===
District 6 consisted of the communities of Clairemont Mesa, Kearny Mesa, Mira Mesa, Mission Valley, North Clairemont, and Rancho Peñasquitos. Five challengers qualified to run against incumbent council member Chris Cate. In the June primary, Cate advanced to the general election to face environmental advocate Tommy Hough. Cate was reelected in the November general election.

San Diego City Council District 6 election, 2018
Primary election
Party	Candidate	Votes	%
Republican	Chris Cate	15,316	56.44
Democratic	Tommy Hough	4,728	17.42
Democratic	Matt Valenti	2,655	9.78
Democratic	Fayaz Nawabi	1,838	6.77
Nonpartisan	Jeremiah Blattler	1,490	5.49
American Solidarity	Kevin Lee Egger	1,111	4.09
Total votes		27,138	100
General election
Republican	Chris Cate	25,022	53.78
Democratic	Tommy Hough	21,505	46.22
Total votes		46,527	100

=== District 8 ===
District 8 consisted of the southern communities of San Diego and those along the Mexico–United States border, including the communities of Barrio Logan, Egger Highlands, Grant Hill, Logan Heights, Memorial, Nestor, Ocean View Hills, Otay Mesa West, Otay Mesa East, San Ysidro, Sherman Heights, Stockton, and Tijuana River Valley. Incumbent council member David Alvarez is ineligible to run due to term limits. Four candidates qualified to run for the open seat. In the June primary, Vivian Moreno, a political staffer in Alvarez's office, and Antonio Martinez, a community health clinic worker and member of the San Ysidro School District Board of Education, advanced to the general election. Moreno was then elected to the City Council in the November general election with a majority of the vote.

San Diego City Council District 8 election, 2018
Primary election
Party	Candidate	Votes	%
Democratic	Vivian Moreno	5,327	35.84
Democratic	Antonio Martinez	4,087	27.50
Democratic	Christian Ramirez	4,084	27.48
Democratic	Zachary Lazarus	1,365	9.18
Total votes		14,863	100
General election
Democratic	Vivian Moreno	14,950	50.94
Democratic	Antonio Martinez	14,401	49.06
Total votes		29,351	100

== Council president ==
On December 10, 2018, the new council was sworn in. For their first action, the council voted unanimously to appoint Georgette Gomez as council president.
