= 2014 San Diego elections =

2014 San Diego City Council election
- November 4, 2014

4 of the 9 seats on the San Diego City Council
	Majority party	Minority party
Party	Democratic	Republican
Seats before	6	3
Seats after	5	4
Seat change	▼1	▲1
Council President before election
Todd Gloria
Democratic
Elected Council President
Sherri Lightner
Democratic

Municipal elections were held in San Diego in 2014 for city council and propositions. The primary election was held on June 3, 2014, and the general election was held on November 4, 2014. Four of the nine seats of the San Diego City Council were contested. Two city council incumbents ran for re-election in their same district and one ran for election in a new district due to redistricting.

Municipal elections in California are officially non-partisan, although most members do identify a party preference. A two-round system was used for the election, starting with a primary in June followed by a runoff in November between the top-two candidates if no candidate received a majority of the votes in the first round.

== City Council ==
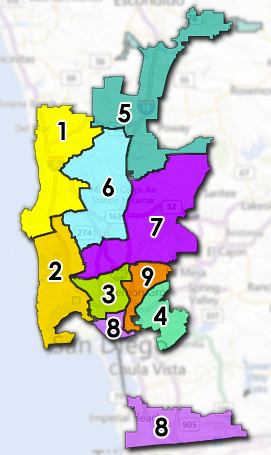
Council Districts used for the 2014 election

The 2014 election was the second to use the new districts created by the 2010 Redistricting Commission. It was the first time that even-numbered districts 2, 4, 6, and 8 were up for election using the new boundaries.

Incumbents Myrtle Cole (District 4) and David Alvarez (District 8) won re-election by getting more than 50% in the June primary. Lorie Zapf (District 2) was also re-elected in the June primary, but in a different district then the one she previously represented due to redistricting. Chris Cate and Carol Kim were the top two vote-getters in the primary for the open seat in District 6. Cate was elected with a majority of the vote in the November 2014 general election.

The primary victories by Cole and Alvarez ensured that self-identified Democrats would continue to control at least a five-seat majority on the City Council. However, the District 6 general election race left open the question of whether or not they would also continue to control a six-seat two-thirds supermajority of the city council, allowing them to overrule a mayoral veto by Republican Mayor Kevin Faulconer on issues that split along party lines. Cate ultimately won the District 6 runoff, denying the self-identified democrats a supermajority.

=== District 2 ===
On March 3, 2014, Kevin Faulconer resigned from the City Council to assume the office of mayor of San Diego, having won the special election to replace Bob Filner. This created a vacancy in District 2. Because the vacancy occurred with less than a year left in Faulconer's term, the vacancy was filled by a City Council appointment per the City Charter. On April 7, 2014, the San Diego City Council voted 5–3 on a second ballot to appoint Ed Harris, head of the city's lifeguard's union, to serve the balance of Faulconer's term. Per the City Charter, Harris was ineligible to run for reelection in 2014.

District 2 consisted of the communities of Bay Ho/Bay Park/Morena, Midway/North Bay, Mission Beach, Ocean Beach, Pacific Beach, and Point Loma. Incumbent council member Ed Harris, who had been appointed to finish the balance of Kevin Faulconer's term, was ineligible to run for reelection. Lorie Zapf, who had been serving as the council member representing District 6, was forced to run in District 2 due to a 2010 redistricting. Zapf was elected with a majority of the votes in the June primary.

San Diego City Council District 2 election, 2014
Primary election
Party	Candidate	Votes	%
Republican	Lorie Zapf	13,600	53.02
Democratic	Sarah Boot	9,864	38.45
Nonpartisan	Mark Schwartz	1,272	4.96
Nonpartisan	Jim Morrison	915	3.57
Total votes		25,651	100

=== District 4 ===
District 4 consisted of the communities of Alta Vista, Broadway Heights, Chollas View, Emerald Hills, Encanto, Greater Skyline Hills, Jamacha, Lincoln Park, Lomita Village, North Bay Terrace, Oak Park, O'Farrell, Paradise Hills, Redwood Village, Rolando Park, South Bay Terrace, Valencia Park, and Webster. Incumbent council member Myrtle Cole was reelected with a majority of the vote in June primary.

San Diego City Council District 4 election, 2014
Primary election
Party	Candidate	Votes	%
Democratic	Myrtle Cole	6,921	57.00
Democratic	Bruce Williams	2,378	19.58
Nonpartisan	Blanca Lopez Brown	1,832	15.09
Democratic	Tony Villafranca	1,011	8.33
Total votes		12,142	100

=== District 6 ===
District 6 consisted of the communities of Clairemont Mesa, Kearny Mesa, Mira Mesa, Mission Valley, North Clairemont, and Rancho Peñasquitos. Incumbent council member Lorie Zapf shifted from District 6 to District 2 due to the 2010 redistricting. Chris Cate and Carol Kim received the most votes in the June primary. Since no candidate won a majority, a runoff was held in November to determine the winner. Cate won a majority in the runoff and was elected to the City Council.

San Diego City Council District 6 election, 2014
Primary election
Party	Candidate	Votes	%
Republican	Chris Cate	10,270	47.17
Democratic	Carol Kim	6,880	31.59
Nonpartisan	Mitz Lee	2,717	12.48
Nonpartisan	Jane L. Glasson	1,012	4.65
Nonpartisan	De Le	895	4.11
Total votes		21,774	100
General election
Republican	Chris Cate	13,399	54.57
Democratic	Carol Kim	11,155	45.43
Total votes		24,554	100

=== District 8 ===
District 8 consisted of the southern communities of San Diego and those along the Mexico–United States border, including the communities of Barrio Logan, Egger Highlands, Grant Hill, Logan Heights, Memorial, Nestor, Ocean View Hills, Otay Mesa West, Otay Mesa East, San Ysidro, Sherman Heights, Stockton, and Tijuana River Valley. Incumbent council member David Alvarez was elected after receiving a majority of the votes in the June primary.

San Diego City Council District 8 election, 2014
Primary election
Party	Candidate	Votes	%
Democratic	David Alvarez	6,720	76.43
Republican	Lincoln Pickard	2,072	23.57
Total votes		8,792	100

=== Council President ===
On December 10, 2014, the new council was sworn in. For their first action, the council voted 4–5 on a motion of whether to reappoint Todd Gloria as council president, with Sherri Lightner joining the four council republicans to defeat the measure. The council then successfully voted to appoint Lightner as the council president with a vote of 7–2, with only Gloria and David Alvarez in opposition.

== June propositions ==
=== Proposition A ===
Ballot Title: Amends City Charter Related to Elections

Ballot Language: " Shall the Charter be amended to: (1) set a later date for elected officials to be sworn into office; (2) extend the deadlines to call special elections to fill vacancies for Mayor and City Council; and (3) make non-substantive revisions, to provide additional time to comply with state and federal deadlines to certify election results, provide mail ballots to military and overseas voters, and translate ballot materials?"

Proposition A
Choice	Votes	%
For	120,656	72.52
Against	45,718	27.48
Total	166,374	100.00
Registered voters/turnout		100.00

=== Proposition B ===
Ballot Title: Referendum of a Resolution Related to Barrio Logan Community Plan Update

Ballot Language: "Shall Resolution No. R-308445, which provides for a comprehensive update to the Barrio Logan Community Plan, be approved?"

Proposition B
Choice	Votes	%
For	72,637	42.28
Against	99,161	57.72
Total	171,798	100.00
Registered voters/turnout		100.00

=== Proposition C ===
Ballot Title: Referendum of Ordinances Related to Barrio Logan Community Plan Update '

Ballot Language: "Shall Ordinances 0-20312 and 0-20313, which amend the San Diego Municipal Code related to the Barrio Logan Community Plan Update, and affect the zoning of999.61 acres located within the Barrio Logan Community Plan Area, be approved?"

Proposition C
Choice	Votes	%
For	68,677	40.15
Against	102,385	59.85
Total	171,062	100.00
Registered voters/turnout		100.00
