= 2010 San Diego elections =

2010 San Diego City Council election
- November 2, 2010

4 of the 8 seats on the San Diego City Council
	Majority party	Minority party
Party	Democratic	Republican
Seats before	6	2
Seats after	5	3
Seat change	▼1	▲1
Council President before election
Ben Hueso
Democratic
Elected Council President
Tony Young
Democratic

Municipal elections were held in San Diego in 2010 for city council and propositions. The primary election was held on June 8, 2010, and the general election was held on November 2, 2010. Four of the eight seats of the San Diego City Council were contested. This was the last election to use eight council districts. Two incumbents ran for reelection in their council district.

Municipal elections in California are officially non-partisan, although most members do identify a party preference. A two-round system was used for the election, starting with a primary in June followed by a runoff in November between the top-two candidates if no candidate received a majority of the votes in the first round.

== City Council ==
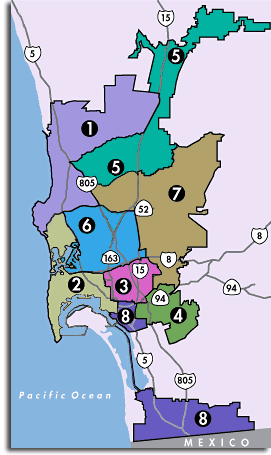
Council Districts used for the 2010 election

The 2010 election was the last to use the eight district boundaries created by the 2000 Redistricting Commission. Seats in districts 2, 4, 6, and 8 were up for election.

=== District 2 ===
District 2 consisted of the communities of Bankers Hill/Park West, downtown San Diego, La Jolla/Mount Soledad, Little Italy, Midway/North Bay, Mission Beach, Mission Hills, Ocean Beach, Old Town, Pacific Beach, and Point Loma. Incumbent council member Kevin Faulconer was reelected with a majority of the votes in the June primary.

San Diego City Council District 2 election, 2010
Primary election
Party	Candidate	Votes	%
Republican	Kevin Faulconer	17,089	61.52
Democratic	Patrick Finucane	6,828	24.58
Nonpartisan	Jim Morrison	3,796	13.67
Total votes		30,987	100

=== District 4 ===
District 4 consisted of the communities of Alta Vista, Broadway Heights, Chollas View, Emerald Hills, Encanto, Jamacha, Lincoln Park, Lomita Village, Mount Hope, Mountain View, North Bay Terrace, Oak Park, O'Farrell, Paradise Hills, Ridgeview, Skyline Hills, South Bay Terrace, Valencia Park, and Webster. Incumbent council member Tony Young was reelected with a majority of the vote in June primary.

San Diego City Council District 4 election, 2010
Primary election
Party	Candidate	Votes	%
Democratic	Tony Young	10,275	72.00
Republican	Bruce Williams	3,947	27.66
Total votes		14,270	100

=== District 6 ===
District 6 consisted of the communities of Bay Ho, Bay Park, Clairemont Mesa, Fashion Valley, Kearny Mesa, Linda Vista, Mission Valley, North Clairemont, and Serra Mesa. Incumbent council member Donna Frye was ineligible to run for reelection due to term limits. Lorie Zapf was elected after advancing to the November general election and receiving a majority of the votes.

San Diego City Council District 6 election, 2010
Primary election
Party	Candidate	Votes	%
Republican	Lorie Zapf	9,931	36.18
Democratic	Howard Wayne	6,758	24.62
Nonpartisan	Steve Hadley	4,846	17.66
Nonpartisan	Kim Tran	3,582	13.05
Nonpartisan	Ryan Huckabone	2,275	8.29
Total votes		27,392	100
General election
Republican	Lorie Zapf	22,869	52.35
Democratic	Howard Wayne	20,692	47.36
Total votes		43,687	100

=== District 8 ===
District 8 consisted of the southern communities of San Diego and those along the Mexico–United States border, including the communities of Barrio Logan, Egger Highlands, Grant Hill, Golden Hill, Logan Heights, Memorial, Nestor, Ocean View Hills, Otay Mesa West, Otay Mesa East, San Ysidro, Sherman Heights, Southcrest, Stockton, and Tijuana River Valley. Incumbent council member Ben Hueso was ineligible to run for reelection due to term limits. David Alvarez was elected after advancing to the November general election and receiving a majority of the votes.

San Diego City Council District 8 election, 2010
Primary election
Party	Candidate	Votes	%
Democratic	David Alvarez	3,343	25.30
Democratic	Felipe Hueso	2,581	19.54
Democratic	B.D. Howard	2,277	17.24
Democratic	Nick Inzunza	2,234	16.91
Nonpartisan	James Wright	1,445	10.94
Nonpartisan	Adrian Vazquez	735	5.56
Republican	Lincoln Pickard	574	4.34
Total votes		13,189	100
General election
Democratic	David Alvarez	13,014	57.33
Democratic	Felipe Hueso	9,540	42.03
Total votes		22,700	100

=== Council President ===
The new city council was sworn in December 2010. Tony Young was unanimously elected as council president and Kevin Faulconer was elected as council president pro tem by their fellow council members.

== June propositions ==
=== Proposition C ===
Ballot title: Amends the City Charter Relating to Limitations and Credits for Veterans' Preference Points

Ballot language: "Shall the Charter be amended to extend eligibility for veterans' preference points in any original Civil Service examination to veterans who have served in the United States Armed Forces during any war, major military action or peacekeeping mission, and to provide an additional five percent credit for any veteran or the spouse of any veteran who has qualifying service-related disability?"

Proposition C
Choice	Votes	%
For	146,141	75.17
Against	48,263	24.83
Total	194,404	100.00
Registered voters/turnout		100.00

=== Proposition D ===
Ballot title: Revises the City Charter Relating to the Strong Mayor Form of Governance

Ballot language: "Shall the Charter be revised to make permanent the Strong Mayor form of governance; add a ninth Council seat; and, when the ninth seat is filled, increase the Council votes required to override a mayoral veto to a two-thirds vote?"

Proposition D
Choice	Votes	%
For	120,107	60.35
Against	78,897	39.65
Total	199,004	100.00
Registered voters/turnout		100.00

== November propositions ==
=== Proposition B ===
Ballot title: Amends City Charter to Add Good Cause Requirement for Certain Terminations or Suspensions of Deputy City Attorneys

Ballot language: "Shall the Charter be amended to establish a good cause requirement for the termination or suspension of Deputy City Attorneys who have served continuously for two years or more, except that any Deputy City Attorney may be subject to layoff due to lack of work or insufficient appropriations?"

Proposition B
Choice	Votes	%
For	238,803	72.26
Against	91,671	27.74
Total	330,474	100.00
Registered voters/turnout		100.00

=== Proposition C ===
Ballot title: Amending Ordinance Number O-18568 (Proposition M of 1998) Relating to Development of Pacific Highlands Ranch

Ballot language: "Shall Proposition M be amended, allowing completion of parks, library, trails, recreation and transportation facilities for Pacific Highlands Ranch by removing a development timing restriction based on completion of the SR-56/I-5 Interchange, only after City Council approves a program of phased development ensuring facilities are constructed before or concurrent with new development, paid for by developers at no cost to taxpayers?"

Proposition C
Choice	Votes	%
For	228,775	70.69
Against	94,866	29.31
Total	323,641	100.00
Registered voters/turnout		100.00

=== Proposition D ===
Ballot title: If Financial Reform Conditions Are Met, Authorizes Temporary One-Half Cent Sales Tax

Ballot language: "To help offset severe state cuts and help restore essential services, including police, fire and street resurfacing, shall the City of San Diego enact a temporary one-half cent sales tax for up to five years, only if the independent City Auditor certifies conditions have been met, including pension reforms and managed competition?"

Proposition D
Choice	Votes	%
For	137,010	38.25
Against	221,166	61.75
Total	358,176	100.00
Registered voters/turnout		100.00
