= Moreno =

Moreno may refer to:

== Places ==
=== Argentina ===
- Moreno (Buenos Aires Metro), a station on Line C of the Buenos Aires Metro
- Moreno, Buenos Aires, a city in Buenos Aires Province, Argentina
- Moreno Department, a department of Santiago del Estero Province, Argentina
- Moreno Partido, a division of the Buenos Aires Province, Argentina

=== Elsewhere ===
- Moreno, California (disambiguation)
- Moreno, Pernambuco, Brazil, a city
- Moreno Rock, a rock in Antarctica
- Point Moreno, a promontory on Laurie Island in the South Orkney Islands

== People with the name ==
=== Lists of people with the name ===
- Moreno (given name)
- Moreno (surname)

=== People with the nickname or professional name ===
- Moreno (footballer, born 1948), Daniel Euclides Moreno, Brazilian football forward
- Moreno (Portuguese footballer) (born 1981), Portuguese football defensive midfielder
- Moreno (footballerc, born 1983), Moreno Aoas Vidal, Brazilian football leftback
- Moreno (Spanish footballer) (born 1986), Spanish football defender
- Moreno (singer) (born 1989), Italian rap singer

== Other uses ==
- Moreno (spider), a spider genus in the family Prodidomidae
- ARA Moreno, an early 20th century battleship of the Argentine Navy
- Department of Agriculture v. Moreno, a United States Supreme Court case
- Imogen Moreno, a fictional character in the Canadian drama Degrassi
- Moreno Venezuelans or Morenos, Venezuelan people who have a mixture of African, Amerindian, and European ancestry
- Jose Moreno, a character in the 1930 Broadway stage play Dishonored Lady
- Jack Moreno, a character in the 1937 film Man of the People

== See also ==
- Morena (disambiguation)
- Morenu
- Perito Moreno (disambiguation)
