= Vivian Moreno =

American politician (born 1982)

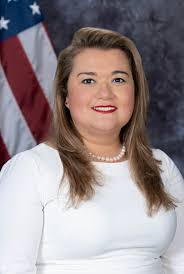

Member of the San Diego City Council from the 8th district
- Incumbent
- Assumed office December 10, 2018
- Mayor: Kevin Faulconer; Todd Gloria
- Preceded by: David Alvarez

Personal details
- Born: 1982 (age 43–44) San Diego, California, U.S.
- Party: Democratic
- Spouse: Miguel Angel Rodriguez (m. 2022)
- Children: 1
- Education: University of California, San Diego (BA)

Vivian Moreno (born 1982) is an American politician serving as a member of the San Diego City Council since 2018, representing District 8. A member of the Democratic Party, she was a candidate for the San Diego County Board of Supervisors in the 2025 special election, placing third behind Chula Vista mayor John McCann and Imperial Beach mayor Paloma Aguirre.

District 8 includes the neighborhoods of Barrio Logan, Egger Highlands, Grant Hill, Logan Heights, Memorial, Nestor, Ocean View Hills, Otay Mesa East, Otay Mesa West, San Ysidro, Sherman Heights, Stockton, and the Tijuana River Valley.

== Early life and education ==
Vivian Moreno was born in 1982 in San Diego, California, and raised in the South Bay. Her father was from Ensenada, Baja California, and worked in a cannery, while her mother was a grocer from Los Angeles, California.

Moreno graduated from Bonita Vista High School and attended Southwestern Community College before matriculating to the University of California, San Diego, where she obtained a Bachelor of Arts degree in political science in 2007.

== Career ==
After college, Moreno worked as a broker-buyer in the metal industry and as a staffer for then-San Diego City Councilmember David Alvarez.

In 2018, Moreno ran for the District 8 seat on the San Diego City Council vacated by term-limited incumbent David Alvarez, who ran to become a member of the California State Assembly representing California's 80th State Assembly district. Moreno and fellow Democrat, San Ysidro school board member Antonio Martinez, defeated two other candidates, advancing from the June 2018 primary with 35.8% and 27.5% of the vote, respectively. Moreno went on to narrowly defeat Martinez 50.9% to 49.1% in the November 2018 general election.

During her first term, Moreno supported reforms to the Barrio Logan community plan that limited industrial pollution near residential areas and allocated funding towards transit infrastructure and parks. She ran for re-election in 2022, advancing from the primary election with 63.4% of the vote. She defeated Martinez for a second time in the November general election with 63.3% of the vote.

On December 26, 2024, Moreno announced her campaign to fill the District 1 seat vacated by Nora Vargas, who announced that she would not take the oath of office for a second term on the San Diego County Board of Supervisors.

== Political positions ==
=== Climate ===
In 2021, Moreno and San Diego mayor Todd Gloria proposed the creation of a climate equity fund to invest in historically disadvantaged communities to combat the effects of climate change. The measure passed 9–0.

=== Homelessness ===
Moreno voted against a city council ordinance in 2023 that permitted police to remove homeless encampments on public property if city shelter beds were available, which passed in a 5–4 vote.

=== Housing ===
Moreno has stated that she opposes rent control measures, instead supporting increased housing construction to combat the housing shortage. Moreno opposed Proposition 10 in the 2018 election, which would have increased local government authority over rent control.

== Personal life ==
Moreno lives in the Ocean View Hills neighborhood of San Diego with her husband, Miguel Angel Rodriguez, and their daughter. She is Catholic.
