= Morena =

Morena or MORENA may refer to:

== Places ==
- Morena, Madhya Pradesh, a town in central India
- Morena (Lok Sabha constituency), Madhya Pradesh
- Morena (Vidhan Sabha constituency), Madhya Pradesh
- Morena, San Diego, California, a neighborhood
- Morena district, Madhya Pradesh, India, encompassing the town of Morena
- Camp Morena, a United States Navy base in California
- Casal Morena (zone of Rome), the nineteenth (XIX) zone of Rome

== Political parties ==
- Morena (political party) (Spanish: Movimiento Regeneración Nacional), a Mexican political party
- Movement for National Rectification (French: Mouvement de Redressement National, MORENA), a political party in Gabon
- National Renewal Movement (disambiguation) (Spanish: Movimiento de Renovación Nacional, Morena), multiple political parties
- Movement of National Restoration, political party that acted as a legal front for Colombian paramilitary groups in the 1980s

== People ==
- Morena (given name), a feminine name, includes a list of people with the name
- Morena (surname), includes a list of people with the name
- Morena (Maltese singer) (born 1984), born Margerita Camilleri Fenech

== Music ==
- Morena, a Spanish pasodoble
- "Morena" (Netón Vega and Peso Pluma song), 2025
- "Morena" (Tom Boxer song), 2009
- "Morena", a 1961 song by Digno García
- "Morena", a 1981 song by Gilberto Gil
- "Morena", a 2000 song by No Mercy
- "Morena", a song by Red Hurley

== Other uses ==
- Morena (goddess), a Slavic deity of harvest and witchcraft
- Morena Dam, California, United States
