= David Alvarez (politician) =

American politician (born 1980)

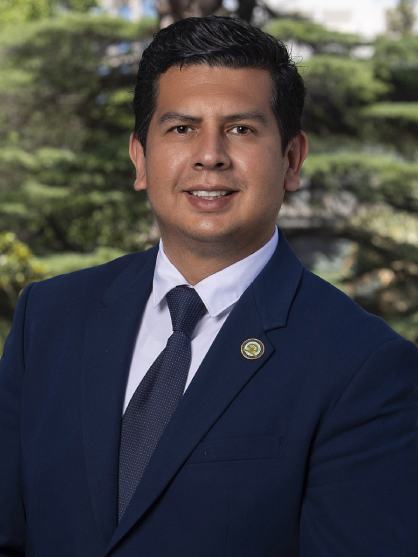

Member of the California State Assembly from the 80th district
- Incumbent
- Assumed office June 15, 2022
- Preceded by: Lorena Gonzalez

Member of the San Diego City Council from the 8th district
- In office December 6, 2010 – December 10, 2018
- Preceded by: Ben Hueso
- Succeeded by: Vivian Moreno

Personal details
- Born: July 27, 1980 (age 46) San Diego, California, U.S.
- Party: Democratic
- Spouse: Xochitl Miramontes
- Children: 2
- Education: San Diego State University (BA)

David Alvarez (born July 27, 1980) is an American politician who is a member of the California State Assembly from the 80th district, which includes Chula Vista, National City, and parts of southern San Diego. A member of the Democratic Party, Alvarez previously served as a member of the San Diego City Council from the 8th district from 2010 to 2018 and was the Democratic nominee in the 2013–2014 San Diego mayoral special election.

In 2022, Alvarez was elected to represent California's 80th State Assembly district in a special election to succeed Assemblymember Lorena Gonzalez, who resigned to take a leadership role at the California Labor Federation.

== Early life ==
Alvarez was born in San Diego to Jose and Maria Alvarez and has four brothers and one sister. He grew up in Barrio Logan. He attended local public schools: Perkins Elementary, Memorial Junior High, and San Diego High School. He was the first in his family to graduate from high school and college. He graduated with honors from San Diego State University. Alvarez, his wife Xochitl, their daughter Izel, and their son Javier reside in Logan Heights.

He began his career as a social worker and after-school teacher. In 2003, he was selected to the Capitol Fellows Program where he served under the California Secretary of State. After his return to San Diego, he worked with a company that develops new opportunities for affordable housing. He later represented California State Senator Denise Moreno Ducheny as a community liaison.

== Political career ==
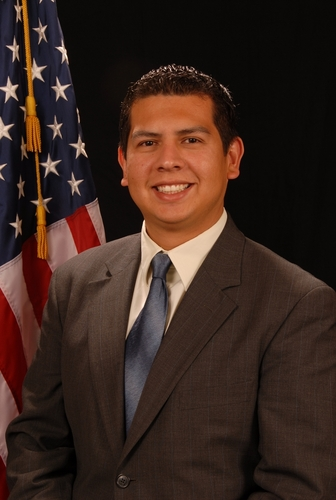
Alvarez as a member of the San Diego City Council.

Alvarez was elected to the San Diego City Council in the 8th district in November 2010, defeating Felipe Hueso with 60% of the vote. The 8th district included the neighborhoods of Barrio Logan, Egger Highlands, Grant Hill, Logan Heights, Memorial, Nestor, Ocean View Hills, Otay Mesa East, Otay Mesa West, San Ysidro, Sherman Heights, Stockton, as well as the Tijuana River Valley.

During his first term, he served as Chair of the Natural Resources & Culture Committee, Vice Chair of the Land Use & Housing Committee, and a member of the Budget & Finance and Rules & Economic Development Committees. Additionally, he served on the San Diego Regional County Airport Authority, San Diego Metropolitan Transit System Board, SANDAG Borders Committee, Otay Valley Regional Park Policy Committee, Bayshore Bikeway Working Group, and the San Diego Consortium Policy Board. He also served on the Board of Directors for Local Progress, a national municipal policy network.

In September 2013, he declared his candidacy for mayor of San Diego. He was the officially endorsed Democratic candidate in the special election to replace Bob Filner. In the primary election held November 19, 2013, he came in second with 25.59 percent of the vote. A runoff election against fellow city councilmember Kevin Faulconer was held February 11, 2014, and Faulconer defeated Alvarez.

In 2014 he ran for re-election to represent District 8, and won outright in the June primary, drawing 75% of the vote. His second term started in December 2014.

In January 2017, Alvarez announced his intention to run for the San Diego County Board of Supervisors representing District 1 in 2020 when incumbent Greg Cox is termed out of office. However, since he would be termed out of office from the City Council prior to 2020, Alvarez chose to run for the San Diego Community College District Board in 2018. Alvarez was ultimately unsuccessful in the election, finishing second to Sean Elo.

In 2019, Alvarez attended a meeting about an SDG&E project and supported its approval, which may have violated city ethics guidelines on former elected officials affecting city decision-making.

== Electoral history ==
=== San Diego City Council ===
2010 San Diego City Council 8th district election
Primary election
Candidate	Votes	%
David Alvarez	3,343	25.3
Felipe Hueso	2,581	19.5
B. D. Howard	2,277	17.2
Nick Inzunza	2,234	16.9
James Wright	1,445	10.9
Adrian Vazquez	735	5.6
Lincoln Pickard	574	4.3
Total votes	13,189	100.0
General election
David Alvarez	13,014	57.7
Felipe Hueso	9,540	42.3
Total votes	22,554	100.0

2014 San Diego City Council 8th district election
Primary election
Candidate	Votes	%
David Alvarez (incumbent)	6,720	76.4
Lincoln Pickard	2,072	23.6
Total votes	8,792	100.0

=== San Diego Mayor ===
2013–2014 San Diego mayoral special election
Primary election
Party	Candidate	Votes	%
Republican	Kevin Faulconer	101,953	42.1
Democratic	David Alvarez	65,740	27.1
Democratic	Nathan Fletcher	58,355	24.1
Democratic	Mike Aguirre	10,783	4.4
Republican	Lincoln Pickard	1,144	0.5
Democratic	Bruce Coons	1,012	0.4
Nonpartisan	Sina "Simon" Moghadam	748	0.3
Nonpartisan	Hud Collins	647	0.3
Nonpartisan	Michael Kemmer	612	0.3
Nonpartisan	Harry Dirks	434	0.2
Nonpartisan	Tobiah Pettus	344	0.1
Nonpartisan	Farrah Pirahanchi (write-in)	5	0.0
Total votes		242,828	100.0
General election
Republican	Kevin Faulconer	153,491	52.9
Democratic	David Alvarez	136,701	47.1
Total votes		290,192	100.0

=== California State Assembly ===
2022 California State Assembly 80th district special election Vacancy resulting from the resignation of Lorena Gonzalez
Primary election
Party	Candidate	Votes	%
Democratic	Georgette Gómez	15,300	38.2
Democratic	David Alvarez	15,132	37.8
Republican	Lincoln Pickard	9,625	24.6
Total votes		40,057	100.0
General election
Democratic	David Alvarez	26,482	54.3
Democratic	Georgette Gómez	22,297	45.7
Total votes		48,779	100.0
Democratic hold			

2022 California State Assembly 80th district election
Primary election
Party	Candidate	Votes	%
Democratic	Georgette Gómez	25,308	36.4
Democratic	David Alvarez	21,548	31.0
Republican	John Vogel Garcia	14,162	20.3
Republican	Lincoln Pickard	8,578	12.3
Total votes		69,596	100.0
General election
Democratic	David Alvarez (incumbent) (Note: Alvarez was not the incumbent in the primary, but was the incumbent in the general election after winning the special election for the seat. The special election was held on the same day as the primary.)	67,309	69.3
Democratic	Georgette Gómez	29,869	30.7
Total votes		97,178	100.0
Democratic hold			

2024 California State Assembly 80th district election
Primary election
Party	Candidate	Votes	%
Democratic	David Alvarez (incumbent)	41,070	59.3
Republican	Michael W. Williams	28,220	40.7
Total votes		69,290	100.0
General election
Democratic	David Alvarez (incumbent)	113,768	61.0
Republican	Michael W. Williams	72,836	39.0
Total votes		186,604	100.0
Democratic hold			
