= Lorie Zapf =

American politician (born 1958)

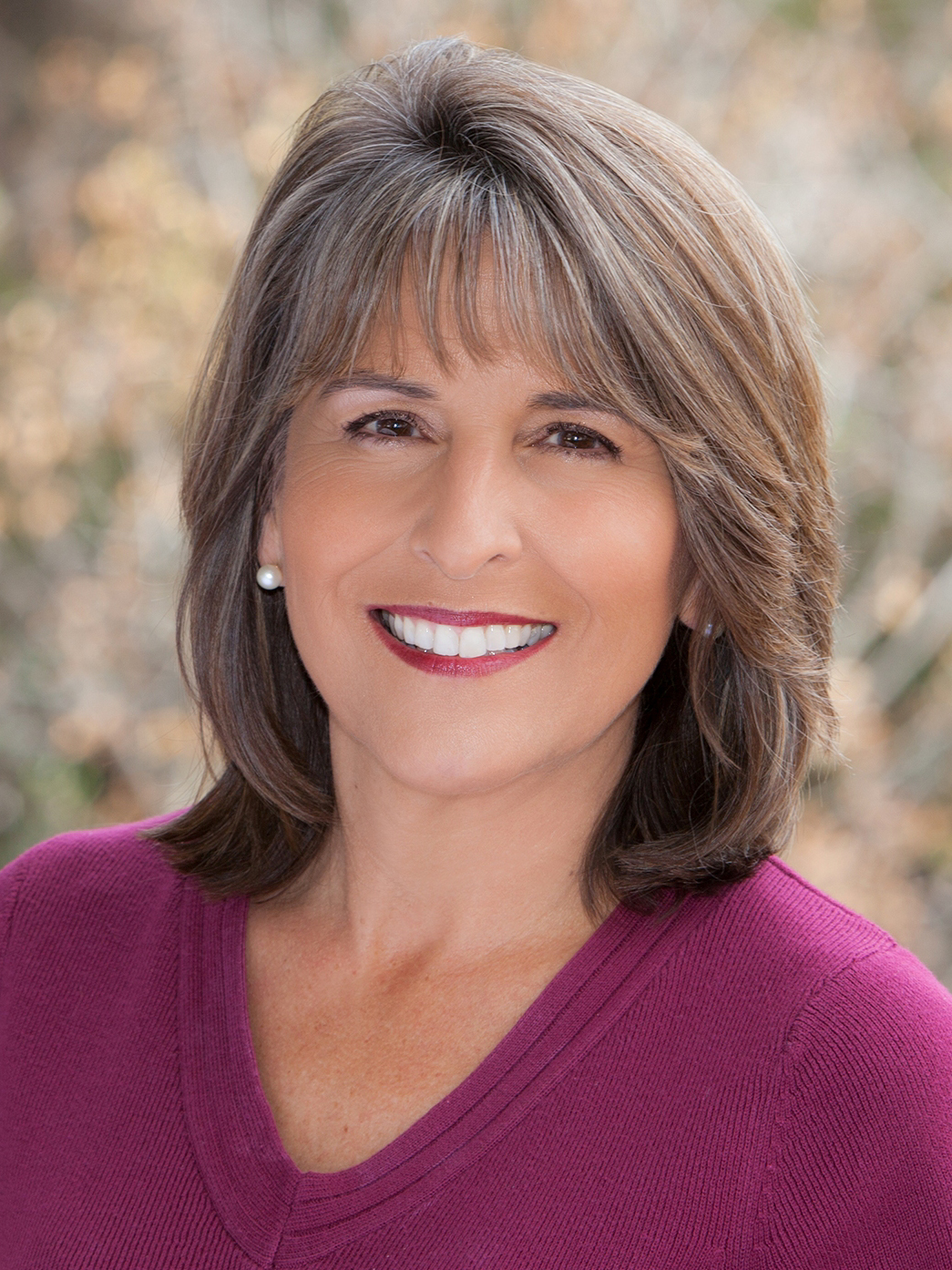
- Official portrait, 2014

Member of the San Diego City Council from the 2nd district
- In office December 10, 2014 – December 10, 2018
- Mayor: Kevin Faulconer
- Preceded by: Ed Harris
- Succeeded by: Jennifer Campbell

Member of the San Diego City Council from the 6th district
- In office December 2010 – December 10, 2014
- Mayor: Jerry Sanders; Bob Filner; Kevin Faulconer
- Preceded by: Donna Frye
- Succeeded by: Chris Cate

Personal details
- Born: 1958 (age 67–68) Los Angeles, California
- Party: Republican
- Spouse: Eric Zapf
- Children: 2
- Education: California State University Northridge (BA); University of Denver (MA)
- Website: City Council District 2 website

Lorie Zapf (/zæf/; born 1958) is an American politician in San Diego, California. She served as a San Diego City Council member representing City Council District 2. She was first elected to office in November 2010 serving District 6, but switched districts in 2014 due to redistricting. In 2018 Zapf lost a bid for reelection, becoming one of the first incumbent council members to lose a reelection campaign since 1992. She is a Republican, although city council positions are officially nonpartisan per California state law.

== San Diego City Council ==
When she was elected to District 6 in 2010, it included the neighborhoods of Bay Ho, Bay Park, Clairemont Mesa, Fashion Valley, Kearny Mesa, Linda Vista, Mission Valley, North Clairemont, and Serra Mesa. Her home in Bay Ho, was moved to District 2 in the 2011 redistricting. She ran for the vacant District 2 seat under the new borders in 2014 and won election to that seat in the June primary, by getting more than 50% of the vote (53.65%). The other neighborhoods in the new District 2 included Bay Park, Morena, Midway/North Bay, Mission Beach, Ocean Beach, Pacific Beach, and Point Loma.

In the November 2018 election, Zapf lost her reelection bid to retired doctor Jen Campbell. This marked the first time that an incumbent had failed to be reelected to the City Council since 1992.

=== Committee assignments ===
- Economic Development and Intergovernmental Relations Committee
- Infrastructure Committee
- Audit Committee (chair)
- Public Safety and Livable Neighborhoods Committee
- Budget Review Committee
- Select Committee on Homelessness

Source: Office of the City Clerk

== Personal ==
She was born in Los Angeles; her mother was a first-generation Mexican American. She is the first Latina to serve on the city council. She and her husband Eric founded a business, Boulder Bar Endurance, a line of food bars sold through health food stores. They sold the company to MAF Bionutritionals in 2002 but remained active in its operation. She has lived in Bay Ho for 17 years with her husband and two daughters.

== Electoral history ==
San Diego City Council District 2 election, 2014
Primary election
Party	Candidate	Votes	%
Republican	Lorie Zapf	13,600	53.02
Democratic	Sarah Boot	9,864	38.45
Nonpartisan	Mark Schwartz	1,272	4.96
Nonpartisan	Jim Morrison	915	3.57
Total votes		25,651	100

San Diego City Council District 6 election, 2010
Primary election
Party	Candidate	Votes	%
Republican	Lorie Zapf	9,931	36.18
Democratic	Howard Wayne	6,758	24.62
Nonpartisan	Steve Hadley	4,846	17.66
Nonpartisan	Kim Tran	3,582	13.05
Nonpartisan	Ryan Huckabone	2,275	8.29
Total votes		27,392	100
General election
Republican	Lorie Zapf	22,869	52.35
Democratic	Howard Wayne	20,692	47.36
Total votes		43,687	100
