= Mareno =

Mareno is a given name. Notable people with the name include:

- Mareno Philyaw (born 1977), American football player
- Mareno Michels (born 1984), Dutch darts player

== See also ==
- Mareno di Piave, commune in the Province of Treviso
- Moreno (given name)
