= Cleophus Prince Jr. =

American serial killer (born 1967)

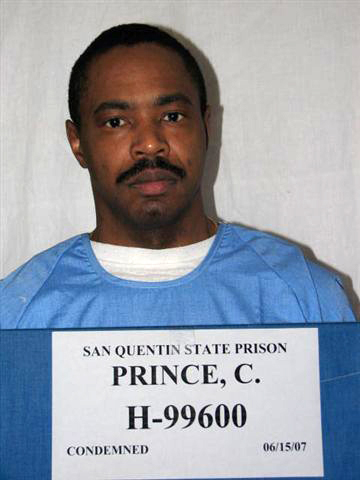
- Born: July 24, 1967 (age 59); Birmingham, Alabama, U.S.
- Other names: The Clairemont Killer; The Clairemont Ripper
- Occupation: Former Navy mechanic
- Status: In prison
- Convictions: First-degree murder with special circumstances (x6); Attempted burglary (x6); Burglary (x14); Rape; Robbery; Perjury
- Penalty: Death (November 5, 1993)

Details
- Span of crimes: January 12 – September 13, 1990
- State: California
- Locations: Clairemont Mesa and University City neighborhoods of San Diego
- Killed: 6
- Date apprehended: March 3, 1991
- Imprisoned at: California State Prison, Sacramento

Cleophus Prince Jr. (born July 24, 1967) is an American serial killer and burglar who was convicted and sentenced to death in 1993 for the rape and murder of six women in San Diego County, California. The killings occurred between January and September 1990 and became known as the Clairemont serial killings as most of the murders took place there. Before these crimes and while serving in the United States Navy, Prince was court-martialed in 1989 due to larceny. Upon being convicted, he was recommended to be discharged after serving his sentence. Multiple books have been written on Prince and his crimes.

== Crimes ==
Cleophus Prince was court-martialed in October 1989 and convicted of larceny. After serving a brief sentence, he was recommended for discharge from the Navy. Two months later, he moved into the Buena Vista Gardens apartment complex, which was close to the location of the first three murders. He lived at the Buena Vista complex until May 2, 1990.

Before his arrest, police characterized the then-unknown serial killer as a "disorganized opportunist" for the common patterns in the crimes. In each case, Prince entered the female victim's residence during daylight hours through an unlocked door or window, surprising them during or just after they bathed and stabbing them to death with knives taken from their kitchen. Police also theorized that Prince may have stalked some of his victims, including Pamela Clark, by following them home from a fitness club in the Miramar neighborhood, near his former girlfriend's residence.

In addition to the murders, Prince was convicted of multiple burglaries and attempted burglaries from April 1990 through February 1991.

=== Murder victims ===
- Tiffany Paige Schultz, died January 12, 1990 (aged 20), lived in an apartment complex adjacent to Buena Vista Gardens. Schultz's boyfriend was initially arrested for her murder, but was released three days later.
- Janene Marie Weinhold, died February 16, 1990 (aged 21), also lived in an adjacent apartment complex. Prince was tied to her murder through DNA testing. Her parents donated money to purchase playground equipment at the South Clairemont Park and Recreation Center in her memory.
- Holly Suzanne Tarr, died April 3, 1990 (aged 18), was visiting her brother and staying at his Buena Vista Gardens apartment. Tarr's slaying led police to believe a serial killer was stabbing women. A ring belonging to Tarr was given by Prince to his girlfriend in December 1990.
- Elissa Naomi Keller, died May 21, 1990 (aged 38), lived in the East San Diego apartment complex where Prince moved in May 1990. A gold nugget ring belonging to Keller was traced to Prince. Keller's mother and daughter did not suspect Prince.
- Pamela Gail Clark, died September 13, 1990 (aged 42), lived in the University City district. Two of Prince's roommates testified he had been in possession of Clark's wedding ring.
- Amber Clark, died September 13, 1990 (aged 18), also lived in University City with her mother, Pamela. At the time the bodies of the Clarks were discovered, Elissa Keller had not yet been identified as a victim of the same killer. San Diego police characterized the case as the largest manhunt in the force's history.

== Apprehension ==
A composite drawing of the killer was distributed in April 1990 based on an eyewitness description; a maintenance worker had seen the killer fleeing the Buena Vista Gardens apartment complex following Holly Tarr's death. San Diego police initially focused their attention on an accused rapist in January 1991, citing similarities in the suspect's description, method and opportunity.

Prince was caught in February 1991 after he tried to break into a Scripps Ranch house. A woman whom he followed home from the Miramar Road health club was getting ready to shower when she heard a noise at the front door. She ran from the house and sought help from a neighbor, who came and confronted Prince. Prince claimed he was trying to find a female friend who had entered the woman's home, but eventually gave up and scuttled away. The eyewitnesses took Prince's license plate number and identified him from photographs. He was arrested on February 4, 1991, in the parking lot of a health club after police alerted health club workers to be on the lookout for his automobile. After his arrest, Prince agreed to provide blood. Saliva samples and the DNA results connected him to the murder of Janene Weinhold. That murder connected him to the others by the pattern presented by the murders.

Pamela Clark regularly exercised at the Miramar Road health club before noon and a swimming pool attendance log placed Prince in the vicinity of Holly Tarr. Prince struck when he knew his victims would be showering and thus be less attentive to their surroundings. He later bragged about the killings to a friend and took to wearing the dead woman's wedding ring on a chain around his neck. He gave another ring to his girlfriend as a Christmas present after taking it from Tarr.

=== Arrest ===
Prince was arrested on an unrelated theft charge on March 3, 1991, in Birmingham, Alabama, where he was visiting family, then released on bail. Birmingham Police East Precinct officer Steven Lampley contacted Prince by phone and told him that there was more bail paperwork that had to be completed. He told Prince that if he came to the precinct office, they would not have to send marked police units to his home (Birmingham Police Department Arrest Report 910313853). After six hours of telephone conversations, Prince walked into the precinct with his mother and was taken into custody. He was extradited to San Diego, where the trial was held.

== Trial ==
After viewing physical evidence, a judge ordered Prince to stand trial in March 1992. The defense argued unsuccessfully that Prince should be cleared of three murder charges due to lack of evidence. Prince was found guilty on July 13, 1993, on all six counts of first-degree murder and 21 other felony charges. After later deliberations, the jury rendered a verdict of death, which the judge handed down on November 5, 1993.

Prince is serving his sentence on death row at California State Prison, Sacramento. Prince appealed his sentence, claiming that extensive media coverage had created a presumption of guilt in the jury pool, but the Supreme Court of California denied his appeal in 2007.

== See also ==
- List of death row inmates in the United States
- List of serial killers in the United States
