= Moreno, California =

Moreno, California may refer to:

- Moreno, Riverside County, California
- Moreno, San Diego County, California
- Moreno Valley, California

== See also ==
- Moreno
