= National Renewal Movement =

National Renewal Movement is the name of several political parties in Latin America:

- National Renewal Movement (Bolivia)
- National Renewal Movement (Panama)
- National Renewal Movement (Paraguay)

== See also ==
- Renewal Movement, a former communist political party in El Salvador
- National Renewal (disambiguation)
