= Moreno (given name) =

Moreno is an Italian given name.

It may refer to:

- Moreno Aoas Vidal (born 1983), Brazilian footballer playing for Udinese
- Moreno Argentin (born 1960), Italian cyclist
- Moreno Ferrario, Italian footballer
- Moreno Mannini, Italian footballer
- Moreno Torricelli, Italian football player and manager

== See also ==
- Morena (given name), feminine form
- Reno (given name), diminutive form
- Moreno (disambiguation)
- Moreno (surname)
