= Palm City, San Diego =

Neighborhood in San Diego, California

Coordinates: 32°35′2″N 117°4′30″W

Palm City, San Diego

Palm City is a neighborhood in the southern section of San Diego, California, United States. Its neighbors are Otay Mesa West to the south and east, Egger Highlands and Nestor to the west, and Chula Vista to the north. It also serves as a gateway to the beach cities of Imperial Beach, and Coronado, by way of the Silver Strand isthmus, due to it being where California State Route 75 meets Interstate 5. Major thoroughfares include Coronado Avenue, Hollister Street, Beyer Boulevard, and Palm Avenue.

== History ==
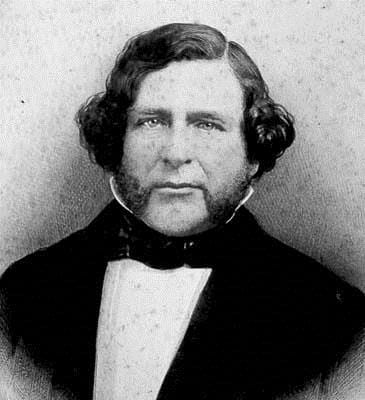
Rancho Melijo, which encompassed all of modern-day Palm City, was granted to Californio ranchero Santiago E. Argüello in 1833.

Prior to the Mexican–American War the area that is today Palm City was part of Rancho La Punta, sometimes referred to as Rancho Melijo, granted to Santiago Emilio Arguello in 1834. The U.S. Land Commission rejected his claim, opening up the area to settlement; which in turn led to the creation of communities in the area.

In 1884, the community received its first mention in The San Diego Union. In the 1880s, John J. Montgomery built and designed his own ornithopters and manned glider designs at the Montgomery family Fruitland Ranch near what would become Palm City. His gliders were tested on the surrounding hillsides of Otay Mesa. These flights represented the first of their kind in the nation. In 1890, a lemon packing house was active in Palm City.

Palm City was established in 1914, and named for the palms lining Palm Avenue. Indeed, the original name for the area was "Palm Avenue", until the post office declared that name unsuitable. That same year, the county opened up a library branch to serve the community. Even a year before it was established, it was the terminus of a small railway, the Mexico & San Diego Railway, that ran to Imperial Beach, and operated two cars.

During the 1916 Hatfield flood, the community was temporarily cut off from San Diego, when the waters from the Lower Otay Lake broke through the Lower Otay Dam, and washed away the San Diego & Arizona Railway's bridge over the Otay River. The flood caused significant damage to the community, destroying nearly all its homes; it would also destroy a Catholic chapel that would later become the origin of Chula Vista's St. Rose of Lima. In 1923 & 1924, there was a brief period of time where oil drilling occurred within the community.

In 1926, the community was all of 250 persons. In 1929, a airway beacon was built by Richfield Aviation in the community. In 1930, hundreds of cows existed on a dozen dairies near the community. Prior to the internment during World War II, the city was home to the Iguchi brothers, who farmed seventy acres in the community. In the 1930s an airport existed within the community; it was available for purchase in 1941.

By 1942, the community had grown to a population of 720. With the end of World War II, the community became a population concentration area for returning Japanese Americans. In 1947, Catholic Bishop Charles F. Buddy dedicates Saint Charles Borromeo Catholic Church. Beginning in 1952 the community maintained its own sanitation district; it was annexed by the city in 1963. In 1955, a drive-in theater began to be planned for Palm City; it opened in 1958. (Note: It is now considered to be located within Imperial Beach city limits.) Palm City, along with other portions of South San Diego, was annexed from San Diego County in 1957.

In 1983, the community experienced damage due to an earthquake, 4.6 on the Richter scale, that occurred ten miles off the coast, in the Pacific Ocean. It was stated by the California Institute of Technology at the time to be the "largest quake to hit San Diego since 1932."

In 2004, using DNA evidence, a convicted felon rapist was found to be responsible for the torture and killing of two boys who went missing in Palm City, near the Otay River, in 1993. He had previously been convicted of a rape that occurred seven months after he had murdered the minors. The felon was sentenced to death, and is housed at San Quentin State Prison.

=== Camp Lawrence J. Hearn ===
Beginning in 1916, the Third Oregon Infantry established the post during its border service. The United States Army, maintained Camp Lawrence J. Hearn, in honor of Major Hearn of the 21st Infantry Regiment, in response to the Mexican Civil War, and was manned by the 1st Cavalry Regiment. It was abandoned in August 1920, but re-established by the 11th Cavalry Regiment in October of that same year. Brigadier General F.C. Marshall visited the post just before he died in a plane crash, traveling to Tucson, Arizona. Until 1921, the post had no structures, and consisted of a tent cantonment; soldiers requiring medical care would be sent to Fort Rosecrans for treatment. However, conditions on the post did not improve significantly, and was described by Army Chief of Staff Major General Summerall as being like a "logging camp", composed of "tumbledown shacks". In 1924, cavalrymen from the post assisted local officers, and federal agents in enforcing a 9 P.M. curfew at the international border crossing. It continued to be in use until it was abandoned in 1931. Later the former post was considered by the Coastal Artillery Corps for the site of a battery, however this was never built.

== Facilities and landmarks ==
Palm City is home to two shopping centers, as well as Sunnyslope Park. The community is served by the San Diego Trolley's blue line, whose Palm Avenue station falls within its boundaries. Several landmarks to John J. Montgomery are in the area including Silverwing Park, and the John J. Montgomery Freeway, a portion of Interstate 5.

== Education ==
Sunnyslope Elementary School, of the South Bay Union School District, serves Palm City. Private schools include Midway Baptist Pre-School. Secondary students who reside in this neighborhood, are served by the Sweetwater Union High School District which has Montgomery Senior High School in neighboring West Otay Mesa.
