= Reno (given name) =

Name list

Reno is a given name, usually but not always masculine, of Spanish origin. It derives from the name Moreno.

Notable people and characters with the name include:

== Given name ==
- Reno Andreini (1875/1880 – after 1924), Italian operatic tenor
- Reno Bertoia (1935–2011), Canadian-American Major League Baseball player
- Reno Browne (1921–1991), American actress sometimes billed as Reno Blair
- Reno Collier, American stand-up comedian and television host
- Reno L. Harnish (born 1949), Director of the Center for Environment and National Security and former American diplomat
- Reno Mahe (born 1980), American National Football League player
- Reno Olsen (born 1947), Danish cyclist, 1968 Olympic track team pursuit champion
- Reno Thomas (1922–2009), American politician, member of the Pennsylvania House of Representatives
- Reno W. Trego (1877–1961), American politician, member of the Wisconsin State Assembly
- Reno Wilmots (born 1997), Belgian footballer

== Stage name ==
- Reno Wilson (born 1969), American actor, comedian and voice actor
- Reno Riggins (born 1967) ring name of American professional wrestler Neal Hargrove

== Fictional characters ==
- Reno Raines, in the TV series Renegade, played by Lorenzo Lamas
- Reno Miller, main character of the film The Driller Killer
- Reno Sweeney, from Anything Goes
- Reno, an antagonist featured in the video game "Final Fantasy VII"
