= South San Diego =

- Group of Neighborhoods of San Diego
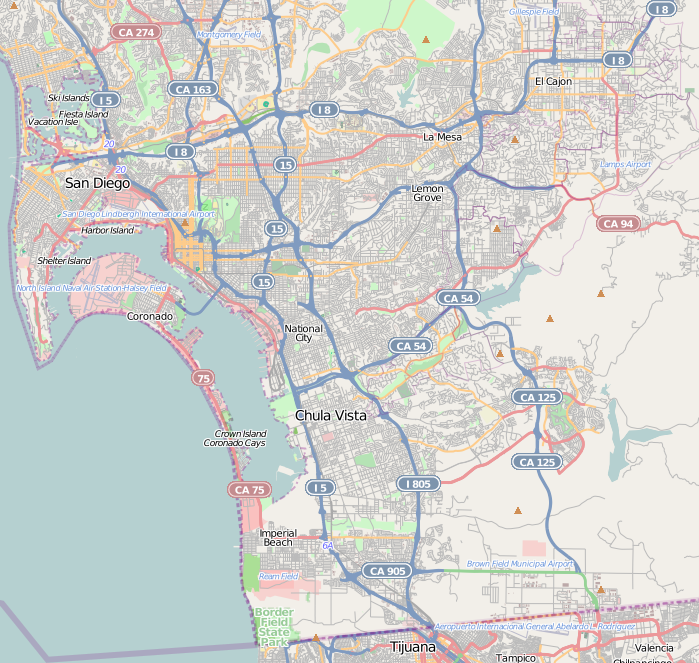
- Location within Southern San Diego
- Coordinates: 32.5549°N 117.044306°W
- Country: United States
- State: California
- County: San Diego
- City: San Diego

South San Diego is a district within San Diego, and is in the larger South Bay region of southwestern San Diego County, California. It is a practical exclave of San Diego, having no land connection with the rest of the city. It is the only part of the city which borders Mexico. South San Diego includes four of the city's official community planning areas: Otay Mesa, Otay Mesa-Nestor, San Ysidro, and the Tijuana River Valley.

== History ==
Before the arrival of the Spanish explorers, the area of South San Diego was inhabited by the Kumeyaay people. The Kumeyaay, also later known as the Diegueño, traveled the region. This is evidenced by the shallow depressions in boulders that were used for grinding acorns into meal, that are found throughout the area.

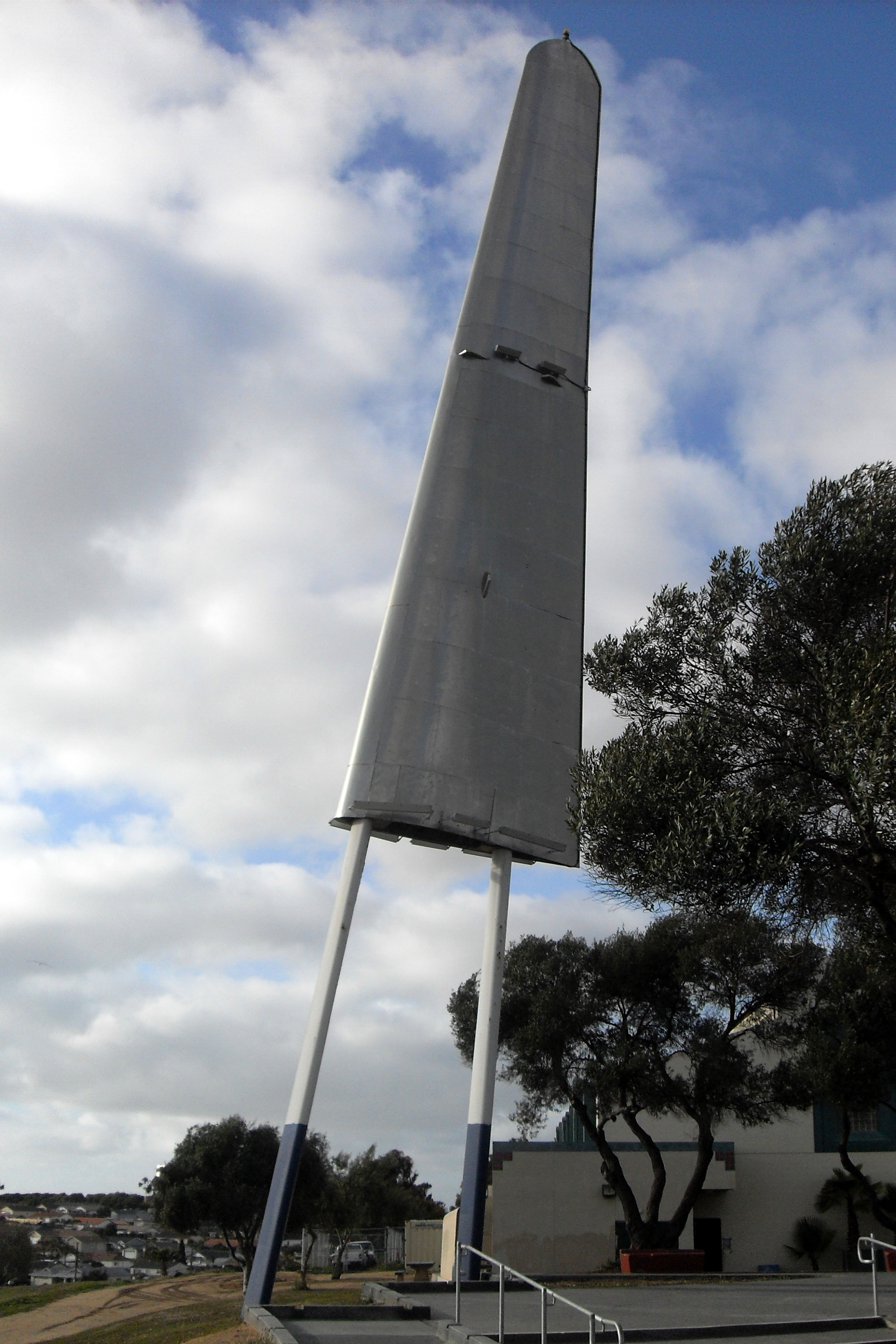
Silver Wing Monument at Montgomery-Waller Recreation Center in South San Diego

John J. Montgomery achieved the first controlled flight with a heavier-than-air flying machine in the United States when he successfully flew three glider aircraft designed in the period 1883-1886 from Otay Mesa. A monument to his historic flights is known as Silver Wing Park, located on Coronado Avenue, just east of Beyer Boulevard. The Interstate 5 freeway in this region was later named the John J. Montgomery Freeway in his honor.

In 1957, the area comprising South San Diego was annexed by the City of San Diego, from unincorporated San Diego County.

On July 18, 1984, in an event known as the San Ysidro McDonald's massacre, James Oliver Huberty, a 41-year-old former welder from Canton, Ohio, committed a mass-murder of 21 people inside a McDonald's restaurant in San Ysidro. The McDonald's site was razed in 1985. The site is now home to a Southwestern College satellite campus.

== Geography ==
South San Diego is within the southern area of the city of San Diego, in far southwestern San Diego County. Land-wise, it is physically separated on land from the rest of the city of San Diego by the cities of National City and Chula Vista. However it and the rest of San Diego are connected by a 400-foot (120 m)-wide city boundary line that runs through San Diego Bay.

South San Diego's boundaries are the city of Imperial Beach on the west, Chula Vista to the north, Otay Mountain to the east, and the U.S.-Mexico border with Tijuana on the south. Brown Field Municipal Airport is located in the Otay Mesa region of South San Diego.

== Demographics ==
As of 2010, the population of South San Diego was 107,631, or 8.2% of San Diego's total population. This breaks down into 65,435 people in Otay Mesa-Nestor, 28,707 in San Ysidro, 13,446 in Otay Mesa and 43 in the Tijuana River Valley. The ethnic makeup was 12.9% non-Hispanic White, 11.7% Asian/Pacific Islander, 4.6% Black and 2.5% Other. 68.1% of the population was Hispanic or Latino of any race.

The median household income varied significantly by neighborhood. In Otay Mesa it was $97,694, in Otay Mesa-Nestor $54,776, and in San Ysidro $32,800.

== Neighborhoods ==
Neighborhoods of South San Diego are defined by the City of San Diego. The City of San Diego groups these neighborhoods into larger sections for planning purposes. Otay Mesa, Otay Mesa West and Ocean View Hills are combined as Otay Mesa. Nestor, Egger Highlands and Palm City are combined as Otay Mesa-Nestor. San Ysidro and Tijuana River Valley are not grouped.

- Otay Mesa-Nestor - 65,435
  - Egger Highlands
  - Nestor
  - Palm City
- San Ysidro - 28,707
- Otay Mesa - 13,446
  - Otay Mesa
  - Otay Mesa West
  - Ocean View Hills
- Tijuana River Valley - 43

== Education ==
=== Primary and secondary schools ===
South San Diego is served by the Sweetwater Union High School District. In addition to the schools listed below, there are 13 public elementary schools. Seven are part of the South Bay Unified School District and six are in the San Ysidro School District.

==== High schools ====
- Montgomery High School
- San Ysidro High School
- Southwest High School
- Mar Vista High School

==== Middle schools ====
- Mar Vista Middle School
- Nestor Language Academy Charter School
- Montgomery Middle School
- San Ysidro Middle School
- Southwest Middle School
