= Chris Cate =

American politician

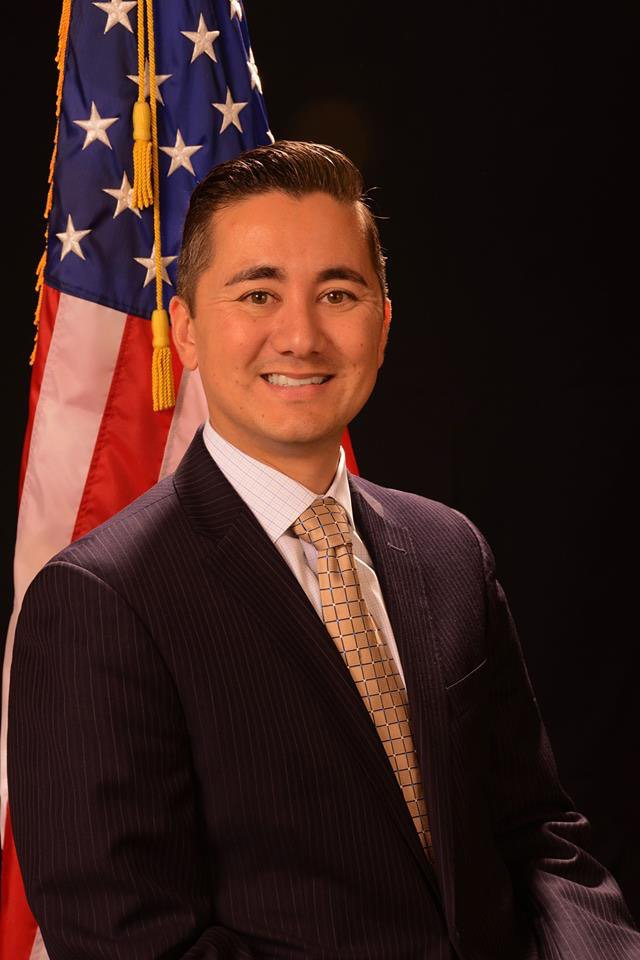

Member of the San Diego City Council from the 6th district
- In office December 10, 2014 – December 12, 2022
- Mayor: Kevin Faulconer; Todd Gloria
- Preceded by: Lorie Zapf
- Succeeded by: Kent Lee

Personal details
- Born: Chula Vista, California
- Party: Republican
- Education: University of San Diego
- Website: City Council District 6 website

Chris Cate is an American elected official in San Diego, California. He served as a member of the San Diego City Council representing City Council District 6 from 2014 to 2022. He is a Republican; although city council positions are officially nonpartisan per California state law.

== Early life and career ==
Cate is the son of a California Highway Patrol officer originally from Kawit, Cavite, Philippines. His mother worked for the United States Postal Service. His parents divorced when he was a child; Cate described both parents as "very apolitical". According to the Southern California Community Press, Cate's family is of Spanish/Filipino heritage.

Cate was raised in San Diego. He attended La Costa Canyon High School, graduating in 2000, then went to community college at MiraCosta and Palomar colleges. While in college, Cate and a friend started an auto glass repair business. After graduating from college at the University of San Diego, where he became interested in politics, Cate then interned at Jefferson Government Relations in Washington, D.C. Later he worked for Kevin Faulconer as a policy advisor. By 2011, Cate lived in Carlsbad, but moved to Mira Mesa a year later. Before being elected, Cate traveled to the Philippines for the first time, and later met with the Ambassador of the Philippines to the United States Jose Cuisia.

In January 2016, Cate married Maria Cabuang.

== San Diego City Council ==
Cate ran against three other opponents during the primary; and ran against Carol Kim during the general election. Cate was first elected to office in the 2014 election, the first election to use the new boundaries for this district following 2010 redistricting. District 6 includes the neighborhoods of Clairemont Mesa, Kearny Mesa, Mira Mesa, North Clairemont, and Rancho Peñasquitos. The redistricting effort included an effort by Asian Pacific Islanders to create a district that represented the inclusion of their more diverse population. When Cate took office, he was the first Asian American elected to the city council in several decades. In 2015, at the age of 32, Cate was the youngest serving city councilmember in San Diego. Cate was only the second Asian American to be elected to the San Diego City Council, the first being Tom Hom.

In 2016, Cate received national attention as the Chargers attacked him for his opposition to Measure C, a ballot initiative to provide public funding for a new stadium for the team. The measure failed to achieve the two-thirds needed to pass, receiving less than a majority of the vote; Cate said of the vote "San Diego voters know a bad deal when they see it,". For his willingness to lead the opposition, the Voice of San Diego wrote positively of Cate. After the election, Cate supported an effort to lease the Qualcomm Stadium site for a dollar, but the Chargers instead decided in 2017 to relocate to Los Angeles.

In his first year in office, Cate's district saw a growth of the brewing industry in his district, with part of it being called the "beer belt". In 2016, while other members of the city council were looking to ban vacation rentals, Cate advanced a proposal to allow for regulated vacation rentals. In February 2017, Cate supported tax reform for Internet taxes, in an effort to ensure the city was receiving a proportionate share of the state's internet tax revenue; Cate argues that with increase commerce online, the city is losing out funding for city services.

According to the San Diego Office of the City Clerk, Cate is a member of the following committees and sub-committees:

- Budget and Government Efficiency Committee
  - Budget Review Committee
- Environment Committee (Vice Chair)
- Public Safety and Livable Neighborhoods Committee (Chair)
- Rules Committee
- Smart Growth and Land Use Committee
- Select Committee on Homelessness

=== Controversies ===
In 2016, Cate was criticized in the San Diego Reader for accepting a five-thousand dollar donation from San Diego Gas & Electric for a charity event, which the paper claimed was an attempt to purchase influence.

==== 2017 SoccerCity Memo Leak ====
In June 2017, Cate leaked a confidential 16-page memo regarding legal questions related to the SoccerCity initiative to the initiative's funders, FS Investors. San Diego City Attorney Mara Elliott called the leak “an egregious breach of public trust”. In October 2017, facing questions from a related lawsuit, Cate admitted he was the one to leak the memo, and that he would not resign. The California Attorney General was handed the case by the San Diego City Attorney. In December 2017, San Diego's Ethics Commission levied its maximum fine of $5,000 for the leak, which Cate paid. In 2018, Cate was informed that he would not face criminal charges.

== Electoral history ==
=== 2014 ===
San Diego City Council District 6 election, 2014
Primary election
Party	Candidate	Votes	%
Republican	Chris Cate	10,270	47.17
Democratic	Carol Kim	6,880	31.59
Nonpartisan	Mitz Lee	2,717	12.48
Nonpartisan	Jane L. Glasson	1,012	4.65
Nonpartisan	De Le	895	4.11
Total votes		21,774	100
General election
Republican	Chris Cate	13,399	54.57
Democratic	Carol Kim	11,155	45.43
Total votes		24,554	100

=== 2018 ===
San Diego City Council District 6 election, 2018
Primary election
Party	Candidate	Votes	%
Republican	Chris Cate	15,316	56.44
Democratic	Tommy Hough	4,728	17.42
Democratic	Matt Valenti	2,655	9.78
Democratic	Fayaz Nawabi	1,838	6.77
Nonpartisan	Jeremiah Blattler	1,490	5.49
American Solidarity	Kevin Lee Egger	1,111	4.09
Total votes		27,138	100
General election
Republican	Chris Cate	25,022	53.78
Democratic	Tommy Hough	21,505	46.22
Total votes		46,527	100
