= Morena (surname) =

Morena, de Morena or de la Morena is a surname. Notable people with the surname include:

- Cris Morena, stage name of María Cristina De Giacomi (born 1956), Argentine television producer, actress, television presenter, composer, musician, songwriter, writer, former fashion model and CEO
- Éric Morena (1951–2019), French singer
- Erna Morena (1885–1962), German film actress
- Fabio Morena (born 1980), German footballer
- Fernando Morena (born 1952), Uruguayan retired footballer
- José Ramón de la Morena (born 1956), Spanish journalist
- Lolita Morena (born 1960), Swiss TV hostess
- Marcelly Morena, Brazilian singer and dancer
- N. de Morena, a 16th-century European ship pilot
- Ottone and Acerbo Morena, 12th century father and son Italian chroniclers
- Serena Morena, Mexican drag queen

== See also ==
- Moreno (surname)
