= National Renewal =

National Renewal may refer to:

- National Renewal (Chile), a liberal conservative political party in Chile
- National Renewal (Peru), a Christian democratic and right-leaning political party in Peru

== See also ==
- Movement for National Renewal (Gabon), a political party in Gabon
- National Renewal Alliance, a conservative political party in Brazil, 1966–1979
- National Renewal Movement (Paraguay), a political party in Paraguay
- National Renewal Party (PNR), an ultranationalist political party in Portugal
- Party for National Renewal, a political party in Mali
