= Moreno (Spanish footballer) =

Spanish footballer (born 1986)

Personal information
- Full name: Alejandro Mendoza Corujo
- Date of birth: 17 May 1986 (age 40)
- Place of birth: Santa Cruz de Tenerife, Spain
- Height: 1.88 m (6 ft 2 in)
- Position: Centre-back

Youth career
- 2002–2005: SD San José

Senior career*
Years	Team	Apps	(Gls)
2005–2006	Tenerife C		
2006–2011	Tenerife B	156	(7)
2011	Tenerife	1	(0)
2011–2012	Conquense	7	(0)
2012	Atlético Granadilla	13	(1)
2012–2014	Birkirkara	72	(3)
2014–2015	Qormi	11	(0)
2015–2018	Mensajero	62	(3)
2018–2024	Ibarra	112	(3)
- * Club domestic league appearances and goals

Alejandro Mendoza Corujo (born 17 May 1986), also known as Moreno, is a Spanish former footballer who played as a centre-back.
