= Perito Moreno =

Perito Moreno may refer to:

- Francisco Moreno, Argentine explorer and scientist
- Perito Moreno Glacier, at the Los Glaciares National Park in Santa Cruz Province, Argentina
- Perito Moreno National Park, on the Northwest of the Santa Cruz Province in Argentina
- Perito Moreno, Santa Cruz, a town in Argentina, near the Cueva de las Manos
