= Point Moreno =

Point Moreno (60°45′S 44°42′W) is a point at the east side of the entrance to the small cove at the head of Scotia Bay, on the south coast of Laurie Island in the South Orkney Islands. Charted in 1903 by the Scottish National Antarctic Expedition under Bruce, who named it for Francisco P. Moreno, noted Argentine scientist and director of the Museo de la Plata.
