= Morena (given name) =

- Gender: female/male

Origin
- Origin: Latin; Sotho; Tswana
- Meaning: brown, brown-haired (Latin). King or chief (Northern Sesotho)
- Region of origin: Europe: Spain, Italy, and Portugal; Eastern Europe; South Africa, Lesotho and Botswana

Other names
- Nicknames: Mo, Ray-ray

Morena is an Italian, Portuguese and Spanish feminine given name derived from the term moreno, meaning "brown, brown-haired". It is a popular name in Argentina, where it was the second most popular name given to baby girls born in Córdoba, Argentina in 2009.

It is a popular name in South Africa too, mainly among Sotho, Tswana and Pedi-speaking people. The name means "king" or "chief" and is usually given to boys of regal lineage; it is also used to praise God/Jesus.

The name is also found in Slavic nations, most probably linked to the Slavic goddess named Morena or Morana.

People named Morena include:

- Morena Baccarin (born 1979), Brazilian American actress
- Morena Gallizio (born 1974), Italian former alpine skier
- Morena Herrera (born 1959 or 1960), Salvadoran feminist and social activist
- Morena Makar (born 1985), Croatian snowboarder
