= Kearny Mesa, San Diego =

- Community of San Diego
- Kearny Mesa
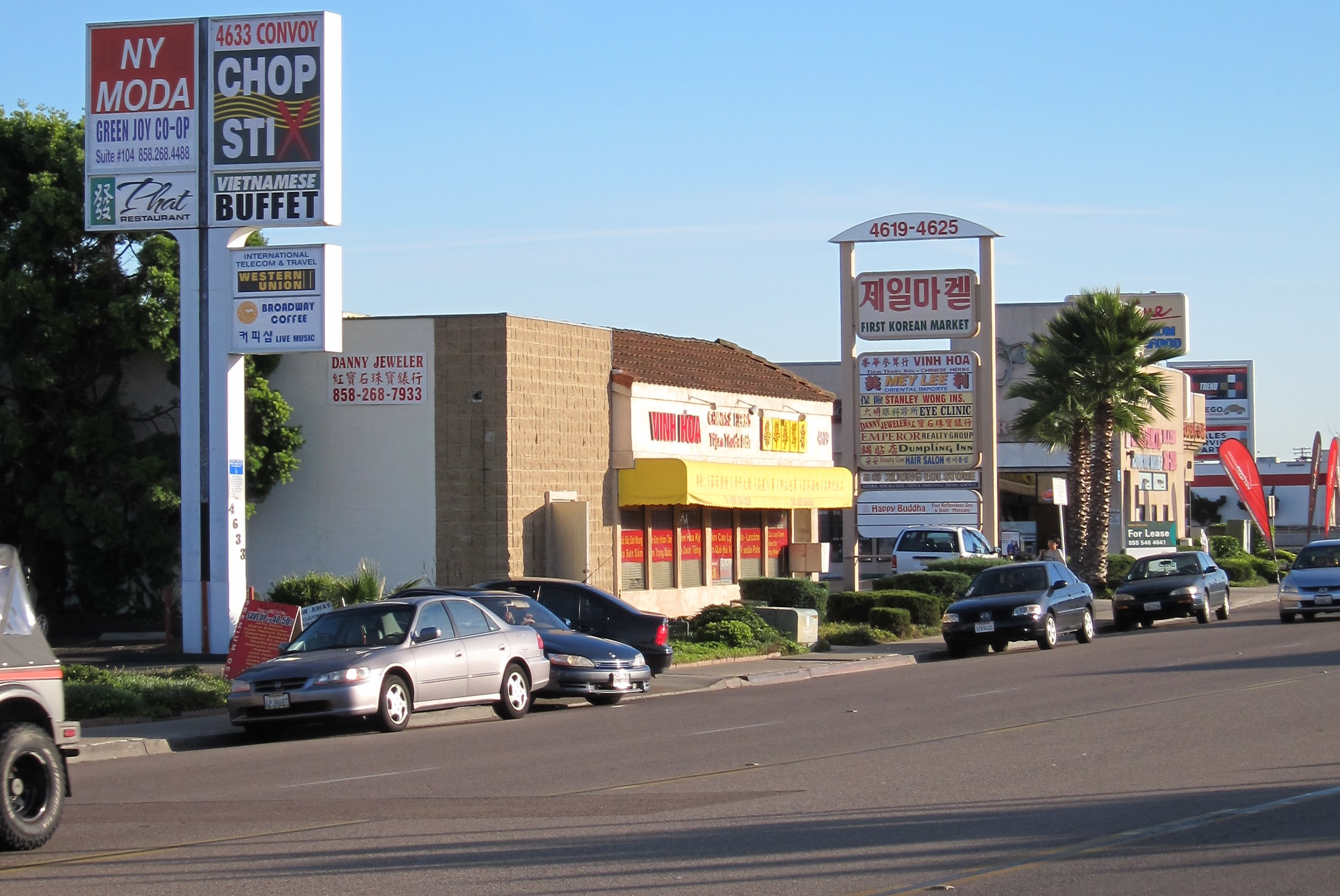
- Convoy Street in Kearny Mesa

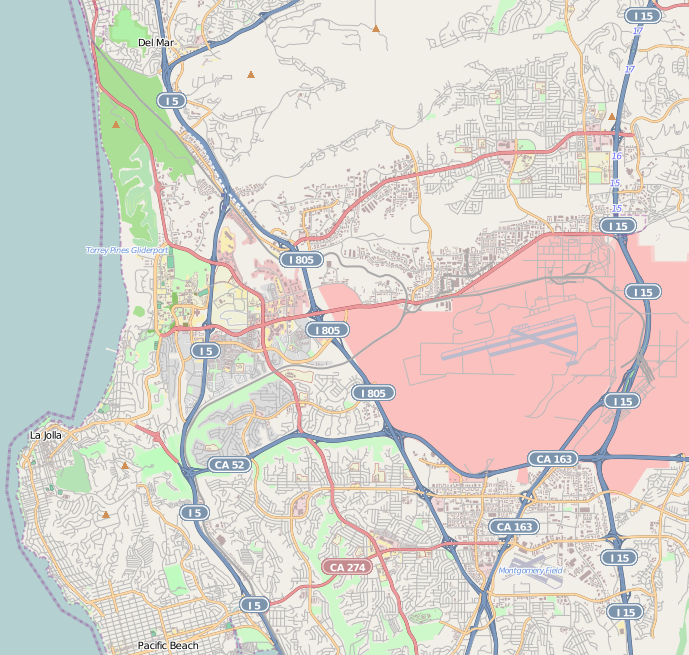
- Location within Northwestern San Diego
- Coordinates: 32.825°N 117.139167°W
- Country: United States of America
- State: California
- County: San Diego
- City: San Diego

Kearny Mesa is a community in the central part of San Diego, California. It is bounded by State Route 52 to the north, Interstate 805 to the west, Aero Drive to the south, and Interstate 15 to the east. Adjacent communities include Serra Mesa, Clairemont and Tierrasanta.

Kearny Mesa has a population of 2,837.

== History ==
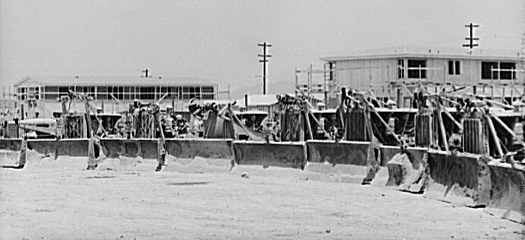
Defense worker housing under construction at Kearny Mesa in 1941. Photo by Russell Lee.

Kearny Mesa is named for the former Camp Kearny, a U.S. military base which operated in the area from 1917 to 1946 and eventually became Marine Corps Air Station Miramar. Camp Kearny in turn was named for Brigadier General Stephen W. Kearny, a leader in the Mexican–American War who also served as a military governor of California. While General Kearny's name was pronounced "Car-nee" during his lifetime, San Diegans use the "Cur-nee" pronunciation.

The urbanization of Kearny Mesa began in 1937 with Gibbs Airfield, now the small airfield Montgomery Field named after pioneer glider pilot John J. Montgomery. In 1948, the City of San Diego acquired the airfield and surrounding property as a possible replacement site for San Diego International Airport. However, airspace conflicts with MCAS Miramar (at that time NAS Miramar) made the proposed airport infeasible. Montgomery Field was restricted to small aircraft and surplus acreage north and northeast of the airport became an industrial park. Beginning in 1955 with General Dynamics, various aerospace and electronic firms were located in the industrial park.

=== 1995 San Diego tank rampage ===
On May 17, 1995, Shawn Nelson stole an M60A3 Patton tank out of the California Army National Guard Armory in Linda Vista and went on a tank rampage through the streets of Linda Vista and then north to Kearny Mesa along Convoy Street. The 57-ton tank easily plowed through road signs, traffic lights, utility poles, and fire hydrants, and crushed approximately forty parked vehicles, including an RV.

=== 21st century ===
In 2020, the Convoy District was designated as a pan-Asian cultural and business district.

== Geography ==
As implied by the word "mesa" in its name, the area is mostly flat. Kearny Mesa is located between the communities of Clairemont to the west, Tierrasanta to the east, Miramar/Mira Mesa to the north, and Linda Vista/Serra Mesa to the south. The neighborhood is defined by the City of San Diego as the area bounded by State Route 52 (SR 52), Interstate 15 (I-15), Aero Drive, and I-805. The city also includes in its definition a stretch of land extending south of Aero Drive along the west side of I-15 to its junction with Friars Road.

Montgomery Field is a local municipal airport in Kearny Mesa. The community is also adjacent to Marine Corps Air Station Miramar.

There are several residential developments in the community, among them Stonecrest, Kearny Lodge, and Royal Highlands.

== Climate ==
Kearny Mesa has a semi-arid climate (Köppen climate classification: BSk) with mild winters and warm, almost rainless summers.

Climate data for Montgomery-Gibbs Executive Airport (normals 1998–2020, extremes 1998–present)
Month	Jan	Feb	Mar	Apr	May	Jun	Jul	Aug	Sep	Oct	Nov	Dec	Year
Record high °F (°C)	88 (31)	91 (33)	93 (34)	100 (38)	102 (39)	100 (38)	106 (41)	105 (41)	107 (42)	105 (41)	99 (37)	86 (30)	107 (42)
Mean maximum °F (°C)	81.5 (27.5)	81.4 (27.4)	83.5 (28.6)	86.7 (30.4)	85.7 (29.8)	86.4 (30.2)	91.4 (33.0)	92.9 (33.8)	98.4 (36.9)	93.4 (34.1)	88.3 (31.3)	80.1 (26.7)	101.7 (38.7)
Mean daily maximum °F (°C)	67.3 (19.6)	67.3 (19.6)	68.5 (20.3)	70.7 (21.5)	72.1 (22.3)	74.7 (23.7)	79.8 (26.6)	82.0 (27.8)	81.4 (27.4)	77.8 (25.4)	72.7 (22.6)	67.3 (19.6)	73.5 (23.1)
Daily mean °F (°C)	56.6 (13.7)	57.1 (13.9)	59.1 (15.1)	61.5 (16.4)	64.4 (18.0)	67.3 (19.6)	71.9 (22.2)	73.7 (23.2)	72.5 (22.5)	67.8 (19.9)	61.4 (16.3)	56.3 (13.5)	64.1 (17.8)
Mean daily minimum °F (°C)	46.0 (7.8)	46.9 (8.3)	49.6 (9.8)	52.4 (11.3)	56.6 (13.7)	60.0 (15.6)	64.0 (17.8)	65.3 (18.5)	63.6 (17.6)	57.8 (14.3)	50.1 (10.1)	45.3 (7.4)	54.8 (12.7)
Mean minimum °F (°C)	37.6 (3.1)	38.2 (3.4)	42.0 (5.6)	45.0 (7.2)	50.4 (10.2)	55.2 (12.9)	60.4 (15.8)	61.5 (16.4)	57.1 (13.9)	50.3 (10.2)	42.0 (5.6)	36.6 (2.6)	35.0 (1.7)
Record low °F (°C)	30 (−1)	33 (1)	39 (4)	37 (3)	44 (7)	48 (9)	57 (14)	55 (13)	52 (11)	43 (6)	34 (1)	32 (0)	30 (−1)
Average precipitation inches (mm)	2.32 (59)	2.65 (67)	1.63 (41)	0.77 (20)	0.28 (7.1)	0.06 (1.5)	0.07 (1.8)	0.01 (0.25)	0.17 (4.3)	0.54 (14)	0.91 (23)	1.61 (41)	11.02 (280)
Average precipitation days (≥ 0.01 in)	6.8	7.9	6.5	5.1	2.8	1.0	0.6	0.3	1.3	3.6	6.1	7.1	49.1
Source: NOAA

== Economy ==
The majority of the Kearny Mesa area is commercial and industrial. Local businesses include auto sales, restaurants (primarily American and Asian), supermarkets (American and Asian), national chain stores, and small businesses. The former General Dynamics site is now a mixed-use development known as Spectrum.

=== Convoy District (Convoy Pan Asian Cultural & Business Innovation District) ===
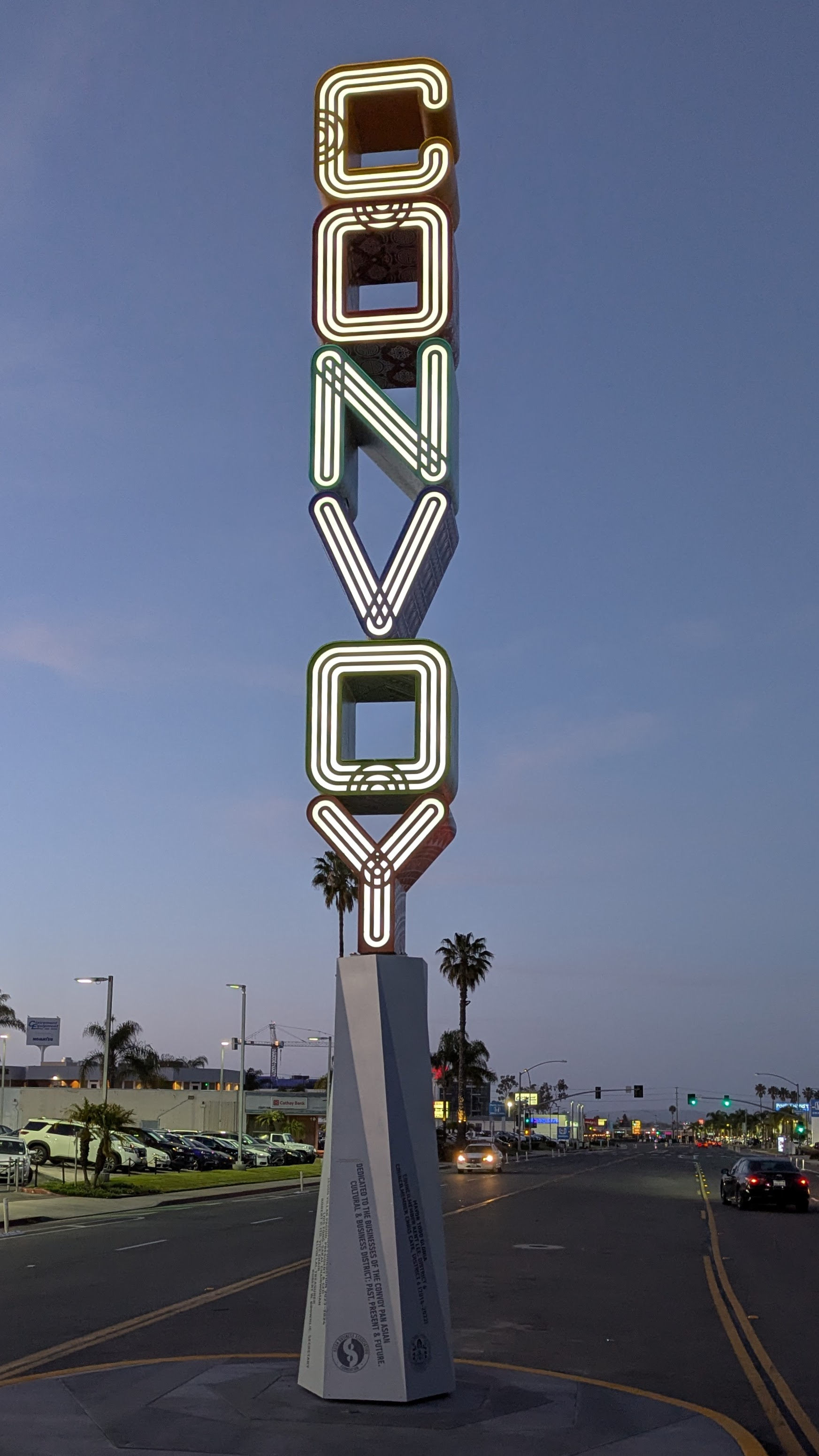
Convoy District gateway sign

The Convoy District is distinguished by its diverse collection of businesses owned and representative of different Asian cultures such as Chinese, Korean, Japanese, Vietnamese, and Thai shopping and eating establishments. Some of these extend to the east/central areas (near Balboa Avenue, along State Route 163).

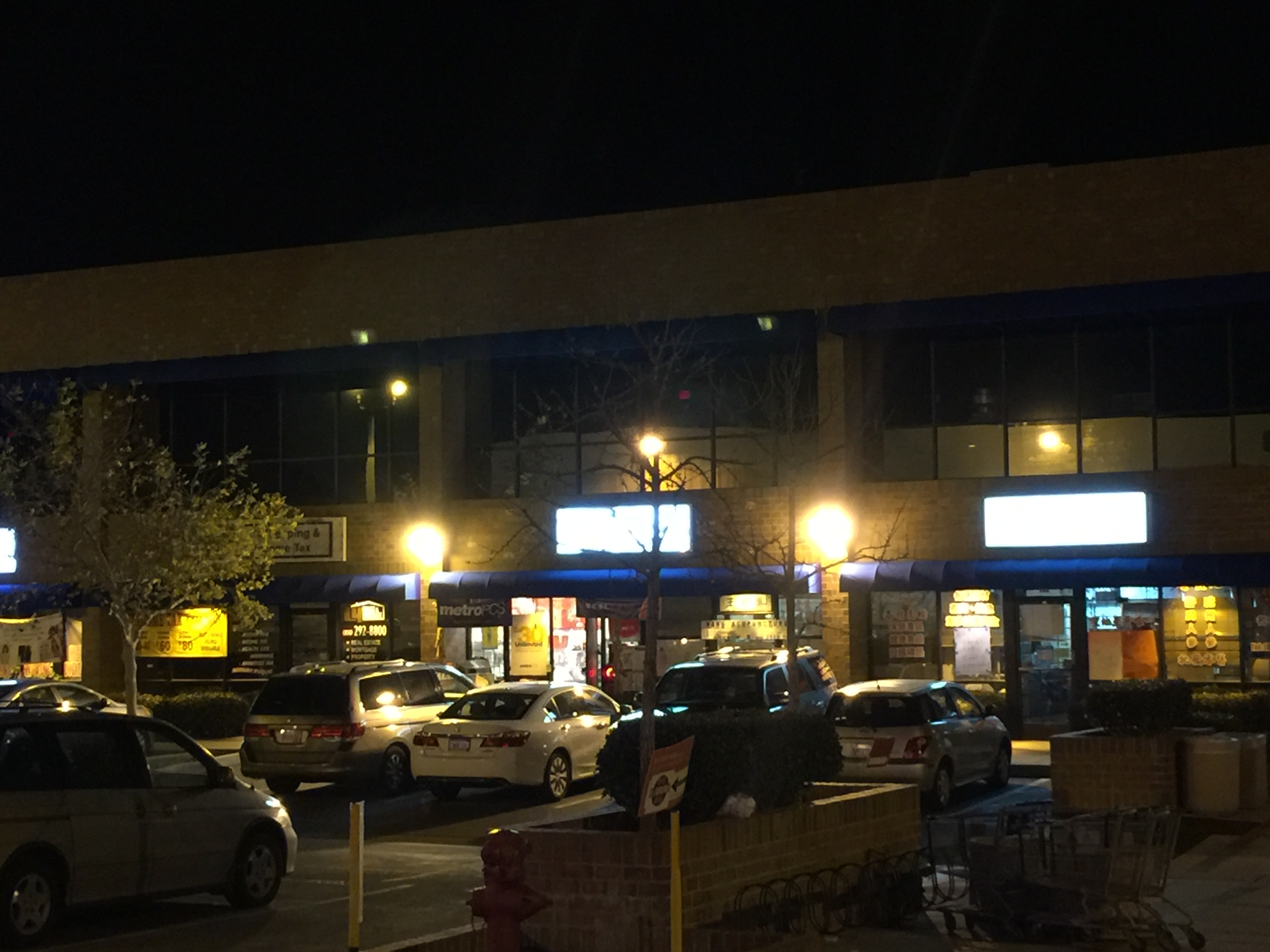
Chinese shops in Kearny Mesa

The presence of Asian businesses in the Convoy District area is said to have started with the establishment of a Woo Chee Chong grocery store on Convoy Street in 1979. The Korean market chain Zion opened its first store in the Convoy District, also in 1979. A few years later, in 1986, Nijiya Market (a Japanese market located in the southwestern portion of the Convoy District), opened its very first store; it later expanded to more than ten locations in California and Hawaii. These early establishments served as small anchors, and additional Asian shops and restaurants opened nearby. As the area's reputation for its Asian cuisine and merchandise grew, more widely established Asian chain stores such as 99 Ranch Market, Mitsuwa, and H Mart also began setting up sites in the Convoy District.

On October 20, 2020 Convoy District was designated as the Convoy Pan Asian Cultural & Business Innovation District after local businesses, tenants, storeowners, and non profit organizations pushed for the name change. Their efforts were brought to San Diego City Council Member, Chris Cate, and Assembly member Todd Gloria, whom they worked with to put the name change into effect.

Many different community-based organizations and fundraisers support and push for the promotion of local businesses within the Convoy Pan Asian Cultural & Business Innovation District. Convoy District Partnership, one of these organizations, helped fundraise over $30,000 to help create 6 different highway signs that help in the promotion of this district.

== Government ==
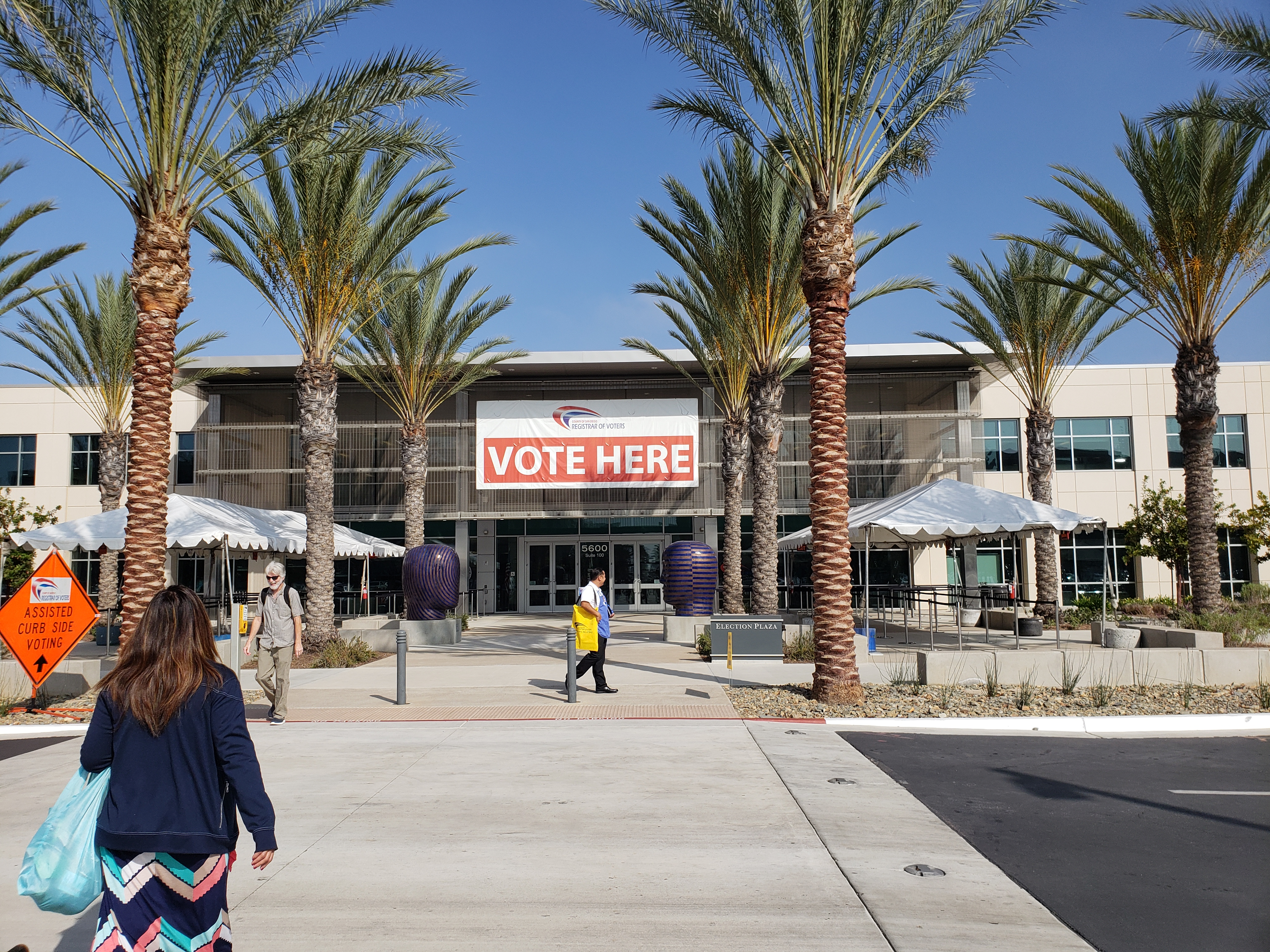
The San Diego County Registrar of Voters

The area is split between City Council District 6, represented by Councilman Kent Lee, and District 7, represented by Councilman Raul Campillo.

The original 1977 Serra Mesa Community Plan included Kearny Mesa. It was replaced by the 1992 Kearny Mesa Community Plan which applies just to Kearny Mesa. The Montgomery Field Master Plan also contains land use policies for areas adjacent to the airport.

The County of San Diego maintains a large complex, housing several county offices and services, in the northeastern corner of the neighborhood near the I-15/SR 52 interchange. Several other city and county facilities are located in or adjacent to the area, including the Miramar Landfill.

=== Community groups ===
The Kearny Mesa Planning Group advises the city on land use and other issues.

== See also ==
- Asian Pacific Thematic Historic District
- Chinatown, Tijuana
