= Morena, San Diego =

Community in San Diego, California

Coordinates: 32°46′01.41″N 117°11′36.60″W

Morena is a neighborhood in San Diego, California, bordered by Bay Park to the north, Linda Vista to the east, Mission Bay to the west, and Mission Valley to the south. E. Mission Bay Drive forms the western boundary. The ZIP Code is 92110.
