= Ocean View Hills, San Diego =

Coordinates: 32°34′48″N 117°0′59″W

Ocean View Hills (sometimes referred to as Ocean Crest) is a residential neighborhood in the southern section of San Diego, California. It borders Interstate 805 to the west and California State Route 905 to the south. It neighbors Otay Mesa to the south and east, Otay Mesa West to the west and Chula Vista to the north. Major thoroughfares include Dennery Road, Otay Mesa Road, Del Sol Blvd and Ocean View Hills Parkway.

== History ==
Ocean View Hills is one of the newest communities in South San Diego, with its development beginning circa 1998. The area which now includes Ocean View Hills was annexed from San Diego County along with other portions of South San Diego in 1957. Formerly known as the "Pits" this area was a haven for off-road vehicles and bon fires.

== Education ==
Ocean View Hills School is a public, K-8 school in the San Ysidro School District.
