= Otay Mesa West, San Diego =

Neighborhood in Southern San Diego

Coordinates: 32°34′50″N 117°3′37″W

Otay Mesa West is a residential neighborhood in the southern section of San Diego, California. It borders Interstate 805 to the east, Interstate 5 to the west, and California State Route 905 to the south. It neighbors Ocean View Hills to the east, Nestor and Palm City to the west and Chula Vista to the north. The northern boundary of Otay Mesa West roughly coincides with the Otay River. Just north of the Otay River the community of Otay resides within the city of Chula Vista. Major thoroughfares include Palm Avenue, Coronado Avenue, Picador Boulevard, Del Sol Boulevard, Beyer Boulevard, and Beyer Way.

== History ==
Otay (pronounced Oh-Tie) is derived from the Kumeyaay language. Although its meaning is disputed, possible derivations include "otai", meaning "brushy"; "Tou-ti" meaning "big mountain"; or "etaay" meaning "big". Mesa is the Spanish word for plateau, table or tableland.

The Otay Mesa West area was used by John J. Montgomery for his experimentation with manned gliders in the 1880s. The Montgomery family ranch was located in the Otay River valley below.

The area which now includes Otay Mesa West was annexed from San Diego County along with other portions of South San Diego in 1957.

== Landmarks and facilities ==
Otay Mesa West abuts the Otay Valley Regional Park, a regional natural resource. Within the neighborhood's boundaries are Palm Ridge Park, Silverwing Park, and Montgomery Waller Community Park.

== Education ==
Public schools in Otay Mesa West include Pence Elementary, Los Altos Elementary, Southwest Middle, Montgomery Middle, Silver Wing Elementary and Montgomery High School.
