= Egger Highlands, San Diego =

Neighborhood in Southern San Diego

- Community of San Diego
- Egger Highlands
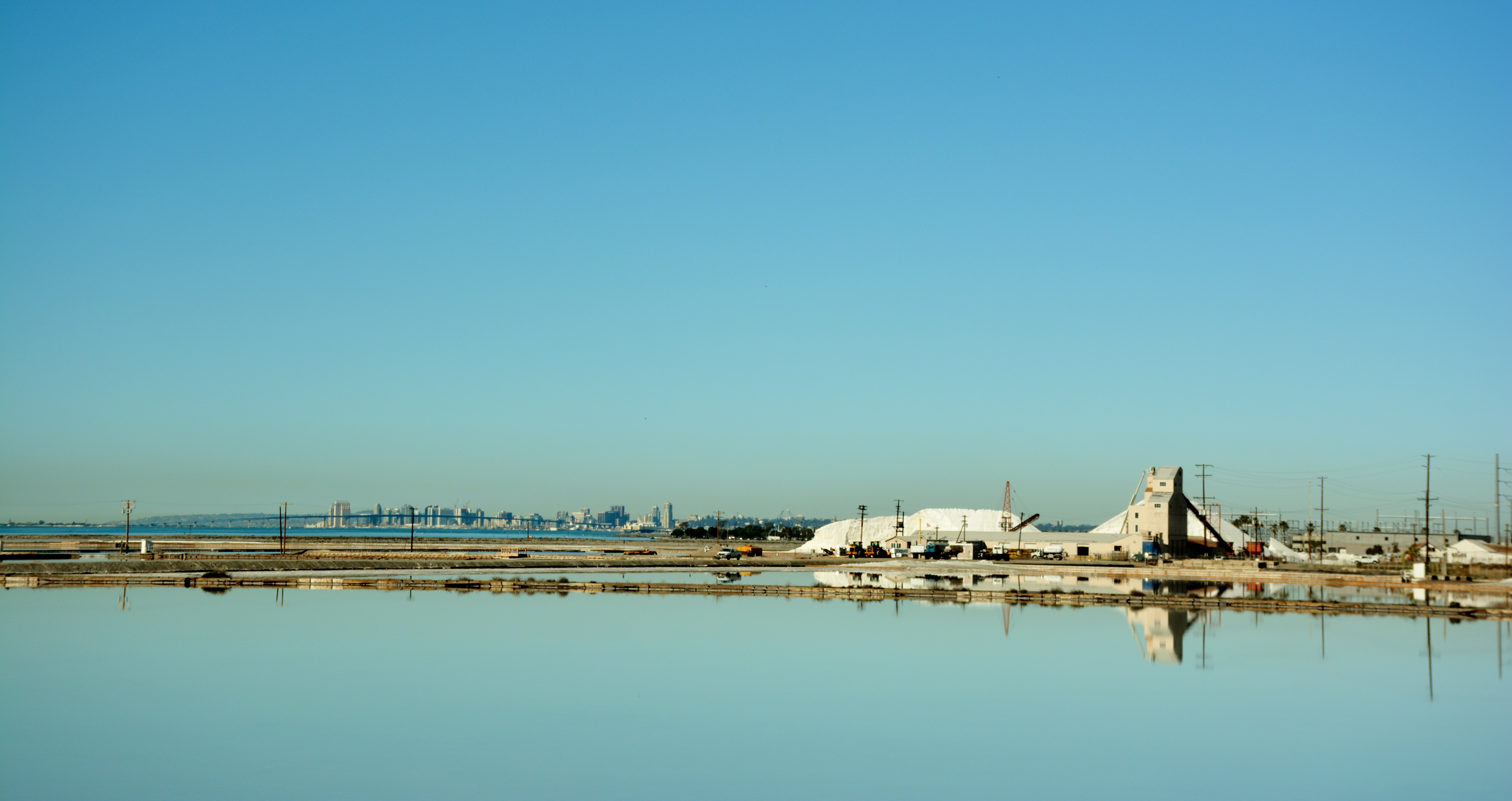
- The Salt Works Plant located on the North side of Egger Highlands.

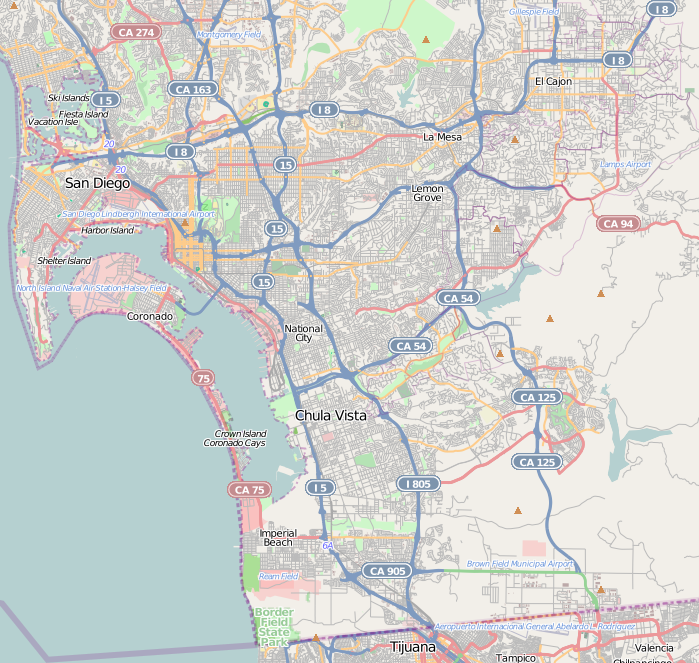
- Location within Southern San Diego
- Coordinates: 32.587103°N 117.096278°W
- Country: United States of America
- State: California
- County: San Diego
- City: San Diego
- Named for: Robert Egger Sr.
- Elevation: 6.6 ft (2 m)

Population (2020)
  - Total: 12,102
- ZIP code: 92154
- Area code: 619

Egger Highlands is a residential neighborhood in the southern section of downtown San Diego, California. It neighbors Palm City and Nestor to the east, San Diego Bay to the north, Imperial Beach to the southwest and Chula Vista to the northeast. Major thoroughfares include Coronado Avenue, Saturn Boulevard, and Palm Avenue.

== History ==
Egger Highlands is named for the Egger family, which donated land in 1946 to house St. Charles Catholic Church, the area's first Roman Catholic church. Egger Highlands, along with other portions of South San Diego, was annexed by the city of San Diego from San Diego County in 1957. In 1993, The murders of Charlie Keever and Jonathan Sellers were believed to have occurred on the Otay River Valley Bike Trail behind the Southland Shopping Center.

== Facilities and landmarks ==
Egger Highlands is home to the Robert Egger, Sr. Community Park, located at Coronado Avenue and Saturn Boulevard.

== Education ==
Private schools in Egger Highlands include the St. Charles School. The area is served by Sweetwater Union High School District and it currently houses just one Middle School which includes Mar Vista Academy.
