= Nestor, San Diego =

Community of San Diego in California

Coordinates: 32°34′12″N 117°4′56″W

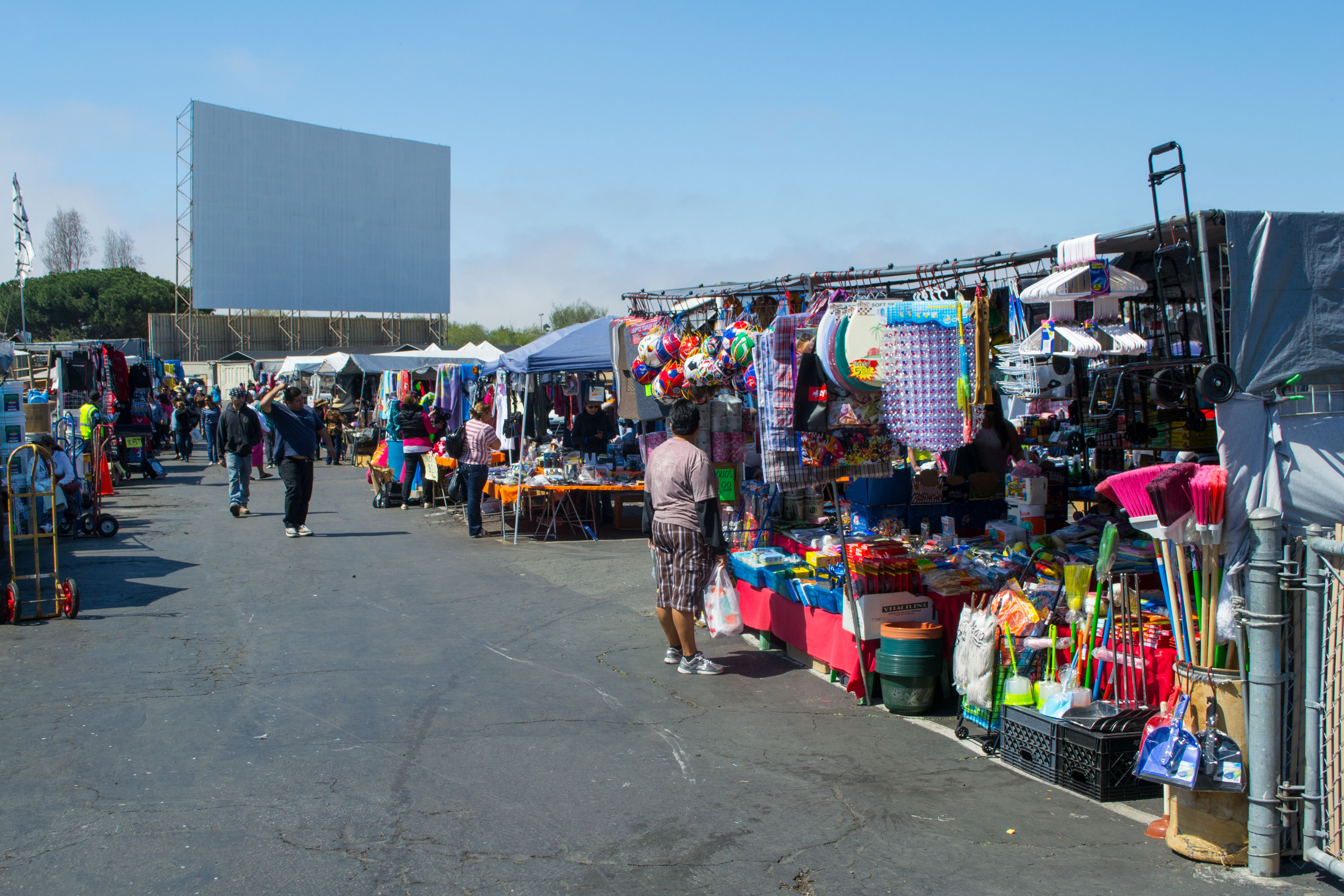
The South Bay Drive-In Theater and Swap Meet in Nestor

Nestor is a residential neighborhood in the southern section of San Diego, California, part of the Otay Mesa-Nestor community planning area. It neighbors Palm City and Otay Mesa West to the east, Egger Highlands to the north, San Ysidro to the southeast and the Tijuana River Valley to the south. Major thoroughfares include Coronado Avenue, Saturn Boulevard, Hollister Street, and Tocayo Avenue.

== History ==
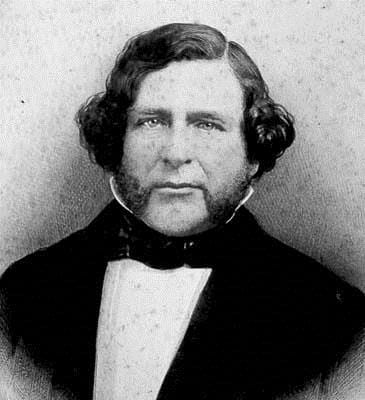
Rancho Melijo, which encompassed modern-day Nestor, was granted to Californio ranchero Santiago E. Argüello in 1833.

Nestor is named for Nestor A. Young, California state assemblyman from 1884 to 1886 and San Diego harbormaster from 1889. The community began as farming community of Japanese Americans. Nestor, along with other portions of South San Diego, was annexed from San Diego County in 1957.

== Facilities and Landmarks ==
At its northern extreme, is the South Bay Salt Works, the second longest running business in San Diego. The South Bay Drive-In Theatre is located on Coronado Avenue, the last standing drive-in theatre in San Diego as of February 2026. Churches includes the Saint Charles Catholic Church, South Bay Seventh-day Adventist Church, Nestor United Methodist Church, and Southwest Baptist Church. Parks include Berry Park and Egger Park. Mount Olivet Cemetery opened in Nestor in 1899.

== Education ==
Public elementary schools in Nestor are part of the South Bay Union School District, and include Emory Elementary, Mendoza Elementary, Nestor Language Academy Charter School, and Berry Elementary. Southwest Senior High School, located on Hollister Street, is part of the Sweetwater Union High School District.
