= Clairemont, San Diego =

- Community of San Diego
- Clairemont Mesa
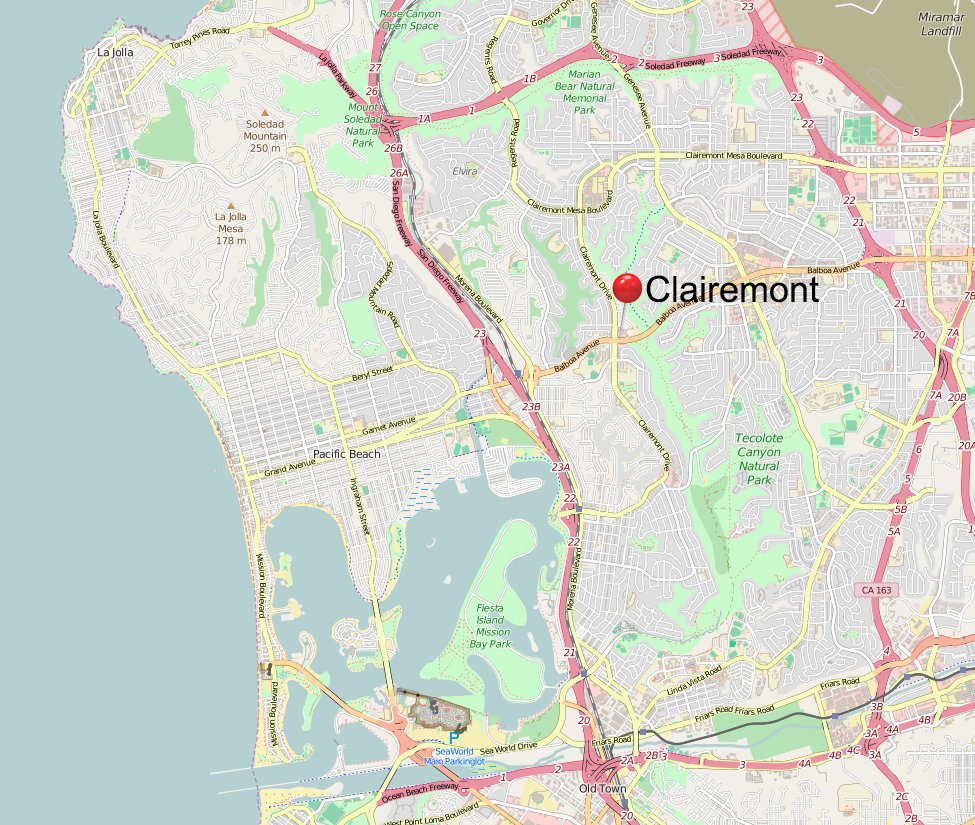
- Coordinates: 32.820461°N 117.190133°W
- Country: United States of America
- State: California
- County: San Diego
- City: San Diego
- ZIP Code: 92110, 92111, 92117
- Area code: 858
- Website: sandiego.gov/clairemontmesa

Clairemont, also known as Clairemont Mesa, is a community in San Diego, California, United States. It has a population of about 81,600 residents and an area of roughly 13.3 square miles (34 km^{2}). Clairemont is bordered by Interstate 805 on the east, Interstate 5 to the west, State Route 52 to the north, and the community of Linda Vista to the south. The community of Clairemont can be subdivided into the neighborhoods of North Clairemont, Clairemont Mesa East, Clairemont Mesa West, Bay Park, and Bay Ho.

== History ==
Clairemont Development in the 1950s (courtesy of San Diego Historical Society)

Prior to in-migration by Europeans, the area was populated by the Kumeyaay people. The Spanish arrived in 1542 and founded Mission San Diego de Alcalá nearby in 1769. Judge Hyde was one of the first settlers of Clairemont and began farming in Tecolote Canyon in 1872. Farming and ranching continued in the area until World War II.

In 1887 the Morena Subdivision was mapped. The 1,200-acre (490 ha) subdivision was bounded by streets that are known today as Morena Boulevard on the west, Milton Street on the south, Illion Street on the east, and on the north by an east-west line approximately 1,000 feet (300 m) north of Gesner Street.

In 1887 a train depot was constructed in the vicinity of Kane Street and Morena Boulevard to accommodate potential buyers in the Morena Subdivision. It was torn down in the early 1920s.

In 1936 the Bay Park Village Subdivision was approved by the City Council. This project, located immediately south of Morena Subdivision and south of Milton Street featured 60 by 100 feet (18 m × 30 m) or larger lots for single-family homes.

In 1939 Bay Park Elementary School was constructed at 2433 Denver Street.

In 1950, Carlos Tavares and Lou Burgener developed what became San Diego's largest post-war subdivision. Originally dubbed "The Village Within a City", people started living in this new Clairemont subdivision in May 1951. The community was named after Tavares's wife, Claire. The design of this new subdivision represented a new concept in community living because it did not incorporate the traditional grid system of uniform blocks and streets. Instead, winding streets and scenic view lots took advantage of the canyons and bluffs overlooking Mission Bay. The first homes, built by Burgener and Tavares Construction Company, had highly customized floor plans.

The developers assembled the necessary acreage to develop Clairemont from three primary land holdings: the Peavey Cattle Ranch, Mission Bay Heights (owned by the Hazard Family), and Tecolote Heights (owned by Jack & Dan Danciger). Before any homes were built in the new development, Tavares & Burgener invested $125,000 in off-street improvements including sewers, water, and access roads; This was necessary because the proposed development was not adjacent to any developed areas. The original subdivision map that used the name “Clairemont” for the first time was approved and recorded by the County of San Diego on October 16, 1950. The map was named "Clairemont Unit #1, Map #2725". This is the area in Clairemont that includes Deerpark Drive, Burgener Boulevard, and Grandview Street from Field Street to Jellett Street. According to Burgener, "Between 1952 & 1954, seven homes were constructed a day". It is also noted that Clairemont was the largest development of its kind in the country.

Within a few years, several thousand houses had been constructed, including single family homes, duplexes and apartments. Since Clairemont was somewhat removed from the city proper, commercial business and retail shopping, schools, libraries and other city amenities were designed into the overall plan. Although the concept of suburban living is commonplace today, this approach was considered novel. Tavares' vision for Clairemont had far-reaching implications for San Diego, as it stretched the city limits outward and began the now familiar pattern of migration from city to suburb.

Marian Bear Memorial Park (aka San Clemente Canyon) and Tecolote Canyon Natural Park were officially designated as parks by the City of San Diego in the 1960s and 1970s.

In 1976, the first Price Club (which would become Costco) opened on Morena Boulevard. Price Club operated at the site until its merger with Costco in 1993.

== Geography ==
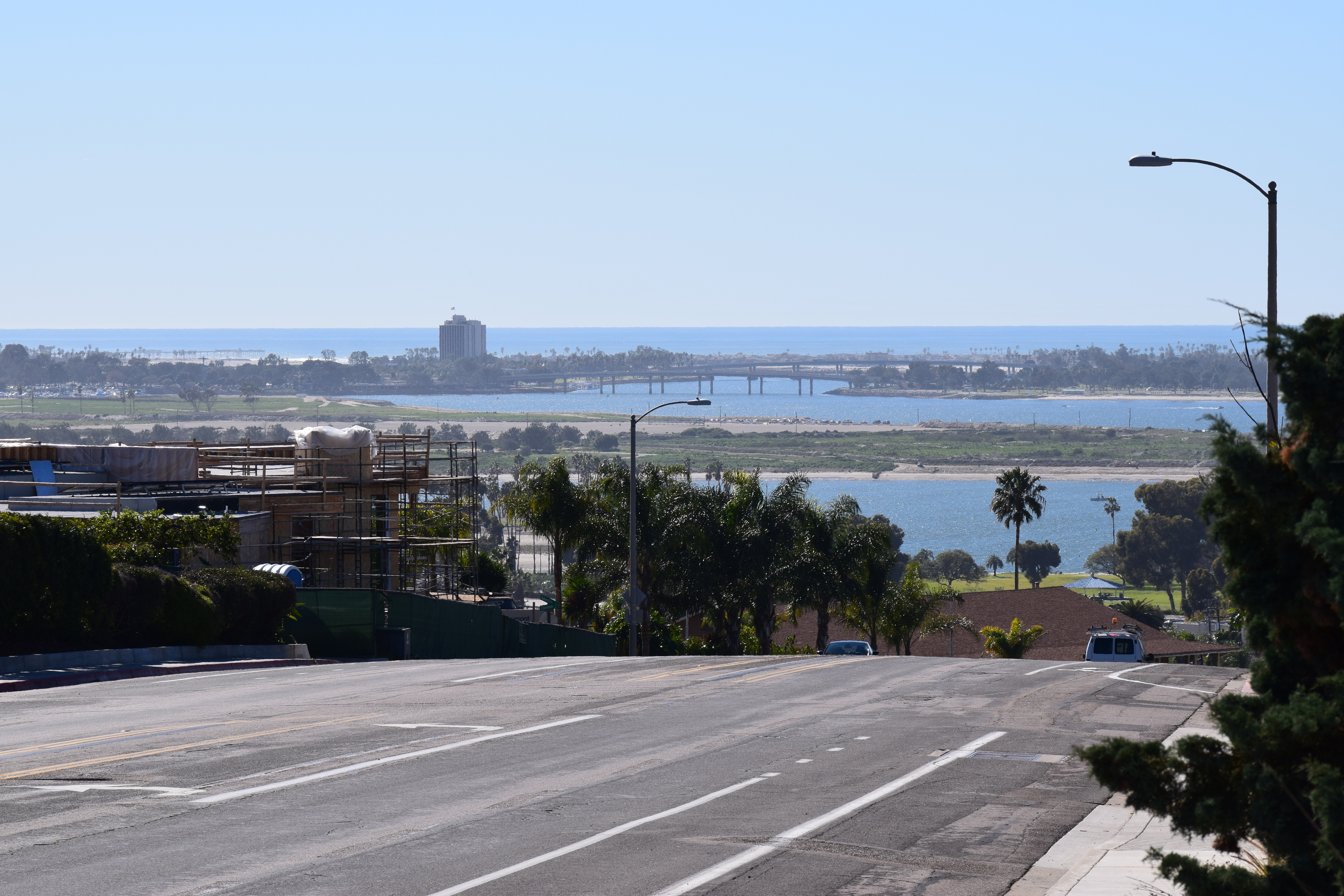
View looking west from Clairemont Drive

Clairemont's main geographical characteristics appear as a terrain of sandstone coastal mesas with canyons eroded by seasonal streams that support riparian woodlands. The predominant topographical features are the gently rolling mesas which are separated by canyons. These mesas are where most of the development is confined. The main canyon system was given the name Tecolote, by Spanish speaking persons after the native owl that lives in this canyon. Tecolote Canyon Natural Park is a protected part the City of San Diego's large parks system. Tecolote Canyon runs north-south through the center of this community, with branches to the northeast. Tecolote Creek, a seasonal stream, runs through the canyon. San Clemente Canyon runs east-west, bordering the community on the north side. Trails extend through both canyons for hiking or mountain biking. The geology in Clairemont is primarily sedimentary.

The native vegetation is primarily chaparral. Trees include coast live oak, California sycamore, and formerly Engelmann oak. Wildlife in the canyons includes coyotes, rabbits, squirrels, feral parrots, and owls (from which Tecolote Canyon takes its name).

Many neighborhoods have views of Mission Bay and the Pacific Ocean on the west, and Fortuna Mountain and Cowles Mountain to the east. Neighborhoods along Tecolote Canyon have views of this preserved open space canyon system.

== Attractions and activities ==
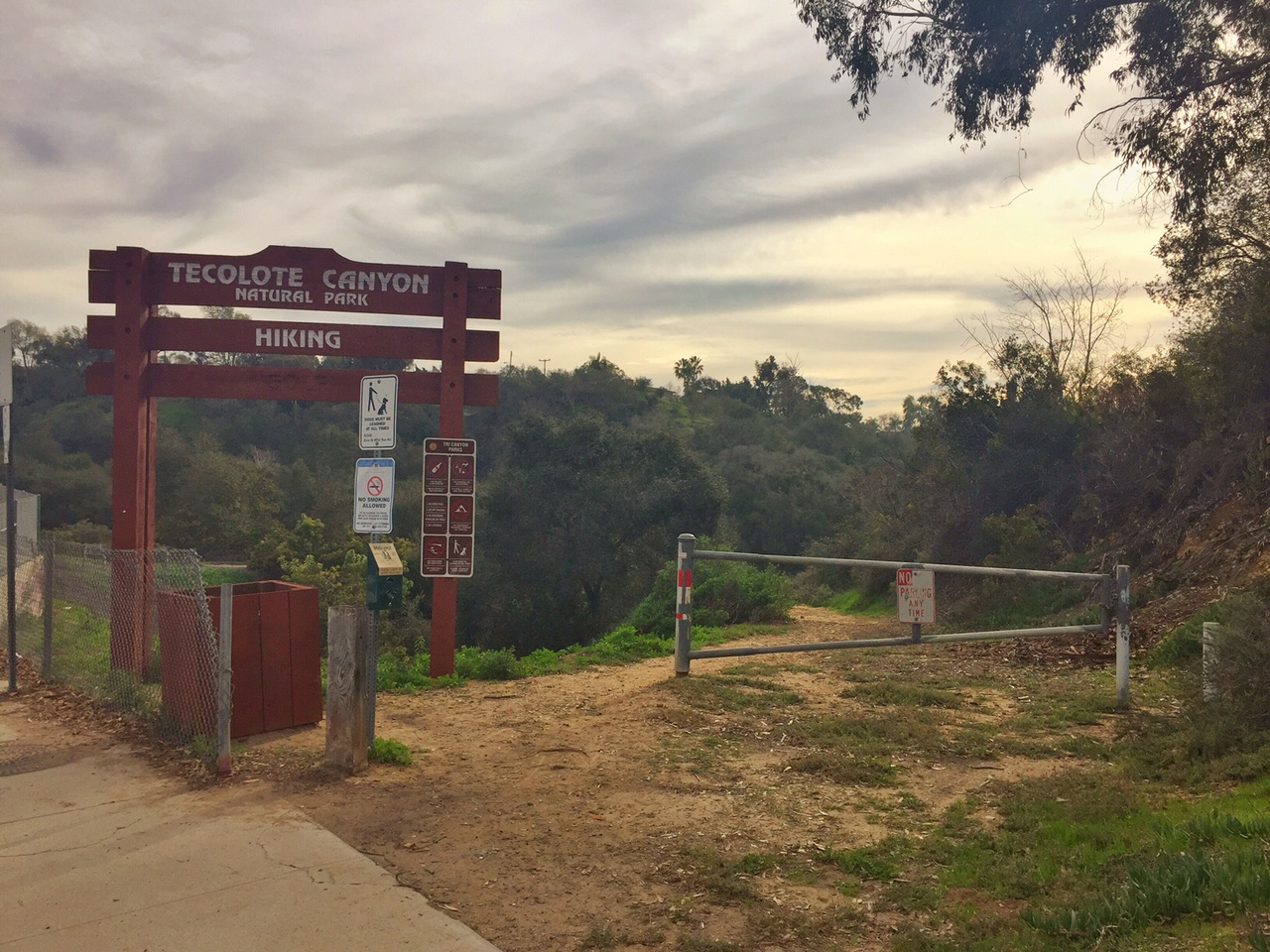
There are many public entrances into the Tecolote Canyon Natural Park. This image shows an entrance off of Genesee Ave.

City of San Diego Parks in and around Clairemont Mesa-

Tecolote Canyon Natural Park - Tecolote Canyon runs through the community of Clairemont Mesa and was dedicated by the City of San Diego as Tecolote Canyon Natural Park in 1977. This park is about 903 acres (365 ha) and is approximately six miles (10 km) long. There are multiple entrances to park throughout the community; some of these entrances provide public parking and bathroom facilities.

Marian Bear Memorial Park - Also known as San Clemente Canyon, it was officially renamed to Marian Bear Memorial Park by the City of San Diego in 1960. Marian Park is roughly 467 acres (189 ha) and runs parallel to the south side of the 52 freeway. The main entrances to the park are off of Regents Road and Genesee Avenue. Both of these entrances provide public parking, restrooms and picnic benches.

North Clairemont Community Park - Located at 4421 Bannock Avenue in North Clairemont. This 14.5-acre park has basketball courts, Multi-purpose sports fields, playgrounds, and a tennis court.

MacDowell Neighborhood Park - Located at 5173 Arvinels Avenue in North Clairemont, just north of Innovation Middle School which was previously known as MacDowell School. This 3.14-acre park features wide lawns with shade trees and a playground. A walk/bike path begins in park and runs south to Clairemont Mesa Blvd west of I-805. Rough trails also lead north into San Clemente Canyon and the Marion Bear Memorial Park trail system.

Gershwin Neighborhood Park - Located at 3508 Conrad Avenue in North Clairemont. This 5.39-acre park features basketball courts, a playground, comfort station, and a tennis court.

Cadman Community Park - Located at 4280 Avati Drive in Clairemont, this 8.36-acre park has baseball, basketball, tennis and a tot lot.

Olive Grove Park - Olive Grove Park is located at 5951 Printwood Way in the Clairemont Mesa East neighborhood. It was built on the site of an olive farm that was one of the area's previous uses before re-development as a residential suburb beginning in the 1950s.

Mount Etna Neighborhood Park - Located at 4741 Mt. Etna Drive in Clairemont Mesa. A 7.32-acre park with three baseball fields, a playground, and a comfort station.

Western Hills Neighborhood Park - Located at 4810 Kane Street in the Bay Park neighborhood of Clairemont. This 12.82-acre park has basketball courts, a playground, and a scenic canyon location.

Mount Acadia Neighborhood Park - Located at 3865 Mt. Acadia Boulevard in Clairemont Mesa. This 9.13-acre park has two softball fields, a playground, a tot lot, and a comfort station.

East Clairemont Athletic Area - Located at 3451 Mt. Acadia Boulevard in Clairemont Mesa. This 9.13-acre sports park has three softball fields, a baseball field, a playground, and a comfort station.

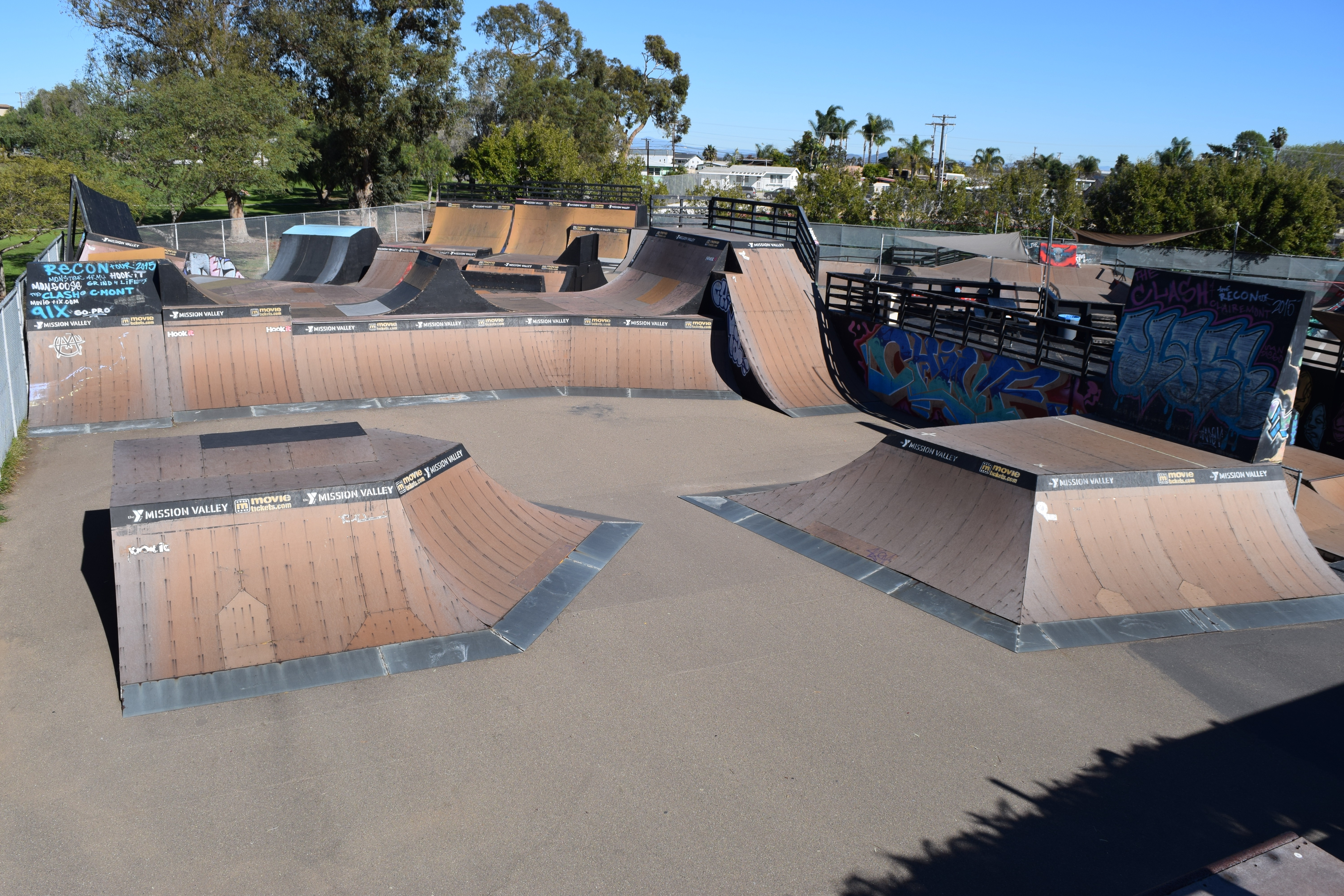
Krause Family Skate/Bike Park

Tecolote Golf Course - This 18-hole 3,161-yard (2,890 m) golf course located within Tecolote Canyon. A natural creek-bed runs through the golf course, which was designed by Robert Trent Jones Sr. and Sam Snead.

YMCA's Krause Family Skate & Bike Park - This destination park is affiliated with the Mission Valley YMCA but is located in the San Diego community of Clairemont Mesa at 3401 Clairemont Drive, San Diego, CA 92117. Skateboards, bikes, scooters, and inline skates are allowed. The large facility includes beginner, intermediate and advanced skate and BMX courses, a street area, mini ramps, a concrete pool, and the former Dew Tour vert ramp. In addition, the park houses the world's first and only Skatercross track, completed in 2016. The park is open to visitors with paid daily or monthly passes. As of summer 2017, the park was undergoing renovations; with old ramps being torn down and replaced in anticipation of the 2017 Clash at Clairemont, an event sponsored by professional skater Andy Macdonald.

== Education ==
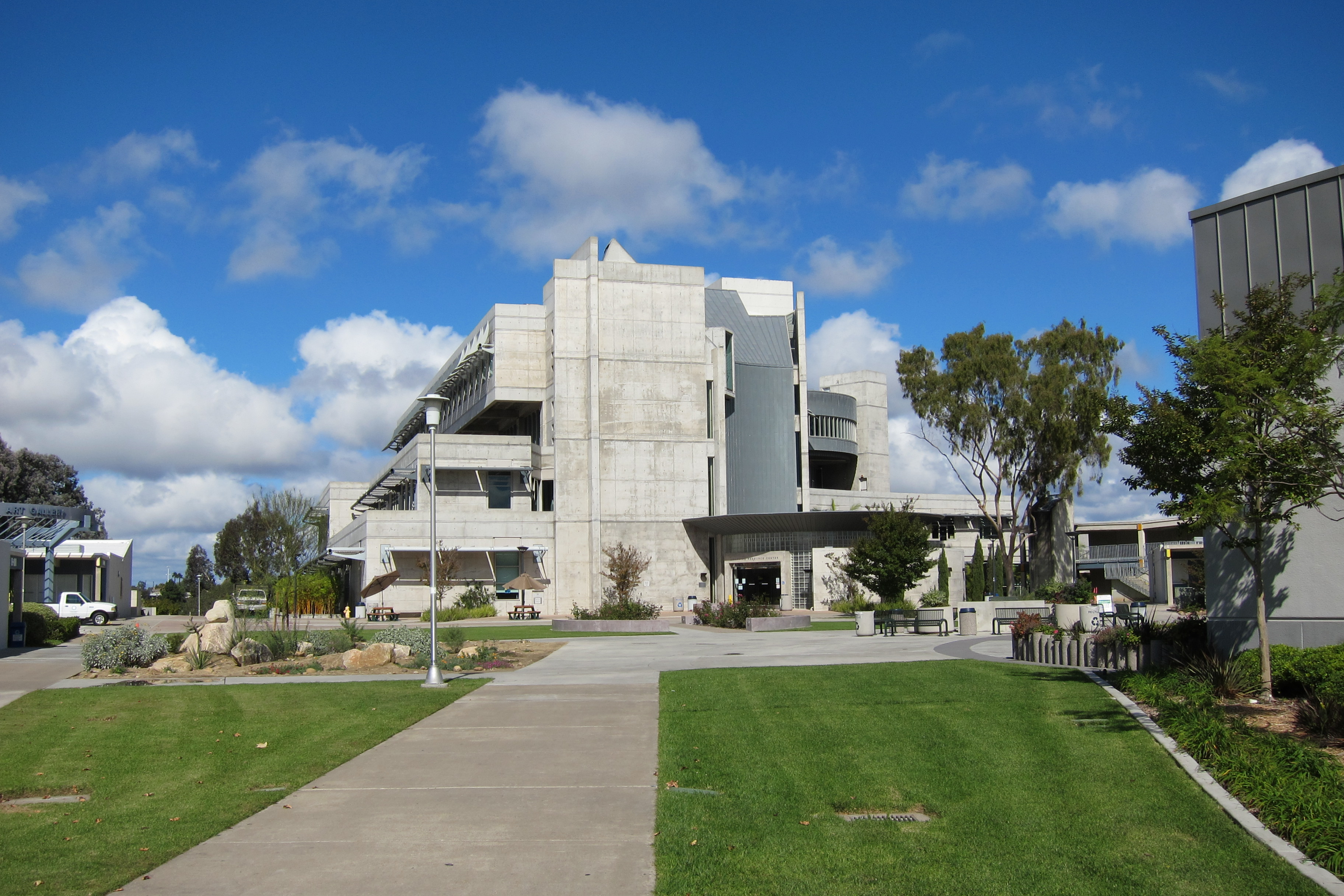
San Diego Mesa College

Public educational facilities in Clairemont consist of twelve elementary schools, two middle schools, two senior high schools and a community college. Five schools with specialized educational programs are also located in Clairemont. San Diego Unified School District operates public schools in the Clairemont neighborhood.

Elementary and middle schools

- Alcott Elementary
- Bay Park Elementary
- Cadman Elementary
- The Child's Primary School
- CPMA Middle School (Creative Performing Media Arts)
- Field Elementary
- Hawthorne Elementary
- Holmes Elementary
- Innovation Middle School
- LaFayette Elementary
- Lindbergh/Schweitzer Elementary School
- Maria Montessori Schools
- Mount Everest Academy (K-12)
- Marston Jr. High
- Ross Elementary
- Sequoia Elementary
- Toler
- Whitman Elementary

Special education

- Longfellow Magnet
- Muir Alternative
- Riley Alternative School
- Schweitzer
- Wiggen

Senior high schools

- Clairemont High School
- James Madison High School

College

- San Diego Mesa College

Supplementary education

- In 2015 the Minato School, a weekend Japanese school, began using Madison High to hold classes.

== Notable residents ==
- Melanie Barcenas, athlete. Signed with San Diego Wave professional soccer team in 2023 aged 15.
- John P. Dolan, Catholic prelate
- Adam Gnade, novelist
- Mark Hamill, actor, played Luke Skywalker in Star Wars films
- Ken Henderson, former Major League Baseball player 1965-1980
- Major Garrett, journalist
- Kris Jenner, television personality, star of reality TV show Keeping Up With The Kardashians
- Kevin Mitchell, baseball player and 1989 National League MVP, San Francisco Giants
- Shawn Nelson, U.S. Army veteran and plumber who stole a tank and drove it around Clairemont
- Cleophus Prince Jr., the "Clairemont Killer"
- Nawaf al-Hazmi, 9/11 hijacker
- Kendra Wilkinson, model and television personality
- Luís Alberto Urrea, writer and poet
- Pete Wilson, former mayor of San Diego and governor of California
- Todd Gloria, politician, mayor of San Diego, California
