= 2006 San Diego City Council election =

- November 7, 2006

4 of the 8 seats on the San Diego City Council
	Majority party	Minority party
Party	Democratic	Republican
Seats before	5	3
Seats after	5	3
Seat change	Steady	Steady
Council President before election
Scott Peters
Democratic
Elected Council President
Scott Peters
Democratic

The 2006 San Diego City Council election occurred on November 7, 2006. The primary election was held on June 6, 2006. Four of the eight seats of the San Diego City Council were contested. All four incumbent council members stood for reelection.

Municipal elections in California are officially non-partisan, although most candidates do identify a party preference. A two-round system was used for the election, starting with a primary in June followed by a runoff in November between the top-two candidates if no candidate received a majority of the votes in the first round. Since each incumbent was reelected with a majority in the June primary, there were no city council runoffs in the November general election.

== Campaign ==
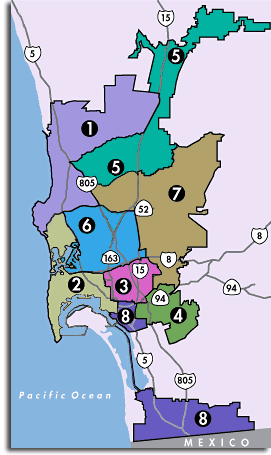
Council Districts used for the 2006 election

The 2006 election used the eight district boundaries created by the 2000 Redistricting Commission. Seats in districts 2, 4, 6, and 8 were up for election.

Although the election featured four incumbent candidates, only Donna Frye had previously served a full term on the city council. Kevin Faulconer and Ben Hueso both were serving partial terms after winning special elections to fill the seats vacated by the resignations of Michael Zucchet and Ralph Inzunza respectively. Tony Young had also served a partial term after winning a special election to fill the vacancy created by the death of Charles L. Lewis.

== Results ==
=== District 2 ===
District 2 consisted of the communities of Bankers Hill/Park West, Downtown San Diego, La Jolla/Mount Soledad, Little Italy, Midway/North Bay, Mission Beach, Mission Hills, Ocean Beach, Old Town, Pacific Beach, and Point Loma. Incumbent council member Kevin Faulconer, who had previously been elected to a partial term in 2005 after the resignation of Michael Zucchet, was reelected with a majority of the votes in the June primary.

San Diego City Council District 2 election, 2006
Primary election
Party	Candidate	Votes	%
Republican	Kevin Faulconer	18,097	71.81
Democratic	Kennan Kaeder	6,920	27.46
Total votes		25,202	100

=== District 4 ===
District 4 consisted of the communities of Alta Vista, Broadway Heights, Chollas View, Emerald Hills, Encanto, Jamacha, Lincoln Park, Lomita Village, Mount Hope, Mountain View, North Bay Terrace, Oak Park, O'Farrell, Paradise Hills, Ridgeview, Skyline Hills, South Bay Terrace, Valencia Park, and Webster. Incumbent council member Tony Young, who had previously been elected to a partial term in 2004 after the death of Charles L. Lewis, was reelected with a majority of the votes in the June primary.

San Diego City Council District 4 election, 2006
Primary election
Party	Candidate	Votes	%
Democratic	Tony Young	10,275	72.00
Republican	Bruce Williams	3,947	27.66
Total votes		14,270	100

=== District 6 ===
District 6 consisted of the communities of Bay Ho, Bay Park, Clairemont Mesa, Fashion Valley, Kearny Mesa, Linda Vista, Mission Valley, North Clairemont, and Serra Mesa. Incumbent council member Donna Frye won reelection with a majority of the votes in the June primary.

San Diego City Council District 6 election, 2006
Primary election
Party	Candidate	Votes	%
Democratic	Donna Frye	18,314	64.89
Republican	Judy Riddle	7,926	28.08
Republican	Sandy Summers	1,908	6.76
Total votes		28,224	100

=== District 8 ===
District 8 consisted of the communities of San Diego along the Mexico–United States border, including the communities of Barrio Logan, Egger Highlands, Grant Hill, Golden Hill, Logan Heights, Memorial, Nestor, Ocean View Hills, Otay Mesa West, Otay Mesa East, San Ysidro, Sherman Heights, Southcrest, Stockton, and Tijuana River Valley. Incumbent council member Ben Hueso, who had previously been elected to a partial term in 2005 after the resignation of Ralph Inzunza, was reelected with a majority of the votes in the June primary.

San Diego City Council District 8 election, 2006
Primary election
Party	Candidate	Votes	%
Democratic	Ben Hueso	7,994	70.13
Democratic	Remy Bermudez	2,180	19.12
Nonpartisan	Tim Gomez	1,161	10.19
Total votes		11,399	100

== Council President ==
The new city council was sworn in December 2006. Scott Peters of district 1 was unanimously elected to a second term as council president after running unopposed. Peters had previously been elected as the first council president under the new strong mayor system of government in San Diego in early 2006. Young continued to serve as council president pro tem.
