= 2002 San Diego City Council election =

- November 5, 2002

4 of the 8 seats on the San Diego City Council
	Majority party	Minority party
Party	Democratic	Republican
Seats before	5	3
Seats after	6	2
Seat change	▲1	▼1

The 2002 San Diego City Council election occurred on November 5, 2002. The primary election was held on March 5, 2002. Four of the eight seats of the San Diego City Council were contested. Two incumbent council members stood for reelection after having previously been elected to partial terms.

Municipal elections in California are officially non-partisan, although most candidates do identify a party preference. A two-round system was used for the election, starting with a primary in June followed by a runoff in November between the top-two candidates if no candidate received a majority of the votes in the first round.

Three of the council seats filled in this election became vacant prior to the completion of the 2006 term end date. This led to three special elections to choose council members to complete these terms.

== Campaign ==
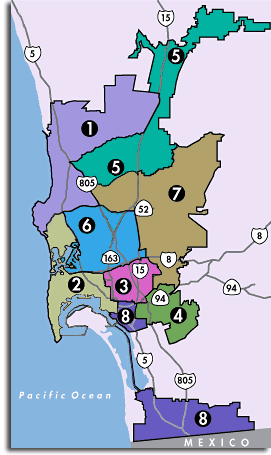
Council Districts used for the 2002 election

The 2002 election was the first to use the eight district boundaries created by the 2000 Redistricting Commission. Seats in districts 2, 4, 6, and 8 were up for election.

Donna Frye and Ralph Inzunza both were incumbents serving partial terms after winning special elections to fill the seats vacated by the resignations of Valerie Stallings and Juan Vargas respectively.

== Results ==
=== District 2 ===
District 2 consisted of the communities of Bankers Hill/Park West, Downtown San Diego, La Jolla/Mount Soledad, Little Italy, Midway/North Bay, Mission Beach, Mission Hills, Ocean Beach, Old Town, Pacific Beach, and Point Loma. Michael Zucchet and Kevin Faulconer received the most votes in the primary and advanced to the general election. Zucchet was elected to city council with the majority of votes in November.

San Diego City Council District 2 election, 2002
Primary election
Party	Candidate	Votes	%
Democratic	Michael Zucchet	9,705	34.1
Republican	Kevin Faulconer	9,063	31.9
Republican	Wayne Raffesberger	4,279	15.0
Nonpartisan	Jim Bell	2,829	9.9
Nonpartisan	Chuck Bahde	1,045	3.6
Nonpartisan	Jim Morrison	841	2.9
Nonpartisan	Woody Guthrie Deck	648	2.2
Total votes		31,929	100
General election
Democratic	Michael Zucchet	22,610	55.6
Republican	Kevin Faulconer	18,050	44.3
Total votes		40,660	100

=== District 4 ===
District 4 consisted of the communities of Alta Vista, Broadway Heights, Chollas View, Emerald Hills, Encanto, Jamacha, Lincoln Park, Lomita Village, Mount Hope, Mountain View, North Bay Terrace, Oak Park, O'Farrell, Paradise Hills, Ridgeview, Skyline Hills, South Bay Terrace, Valencia Park, and Webster. Incumbent council member Tony Young, who had previously been elected to a partial term in 2004 after the death of Charles L. Lewis, was reelected with a majority of the votes in the June primary.

San Diego City Council District 4 election, 2002
Primary election
Party	Candidate	Votes	%
Democratic	Charles L. Lewis	6,065	40.0
Democratic	Dwayne Crenshaw	3,481	22.9
Democratic	Butch Hubble	1,655	10.9
Nonpartisan	Marissa Acierto	1,134	7.4
Nonpartisan	Fulberto Rodriguez	971	6.4
Nonpartisan	Tonja McCoy	593	3.9
Nonpartisan	Robert Tambuzi	501	3.3
Nonpartisan	James Galley	450	2.9
Nonpartisan	Oran Brown	196	1.2
Nonpartisan	Milton Gale	97	0.6
Total votes		16,389	100
General election
Democratic	Charles L. Lewis	11,965	52.3
Democratic	Dwayne Crenshaw	10,908	47.6
Total votes		22,873	100

=== District 6 ===
District 6 consisted of the communities of Bay Ho, Bay Park, Clairemont Mesa, Fashion Valley, Kearny Mesa, Linda Vista, Mission Valley, North Clairemont, and Serra Mesa. Incumbent council member Donna Frye won reelection with a majority of the votes in the June primary.

San Diego City Council District 6 election, 2002
Primary election
Party	Candidate	Votes	%
Democratic	Donna Frye	17,136	64.0
Republican	Thomas W. Martin	9,599	35.9
Total votes		28,633	100

=== District 8 ===
District 8 consisted of the communities of San Diego along the Mexico–United States border, including the communities of Barrio Logan, Egger Highlands, Grant Hill, Golden Hill, Logan Heights, Memorial, Nestor, Ocean View Hills, Otay Mesa West, Otay Mesa East, San Ysidro, Sherman Heights, Southcrest, Stockton, and Tijuana River Valley. Incumbent council member Ben Hueso, who had previously been elected to a partial term in 2005 after the resignation of Ralph Inzunza, was reelected with a majority of the votes in the June primary.

San Diego City Council District 8 election, 2002
Primary election
Party	Candidate	Votes	%
Democratic	Ralph Inzunza	6,103	69.9
Democratic	Yolanda Escamilla	2,620	30.0
Total votes		11,399	100
