= Monica Montgomery Steppe =

American politician (born 1978)

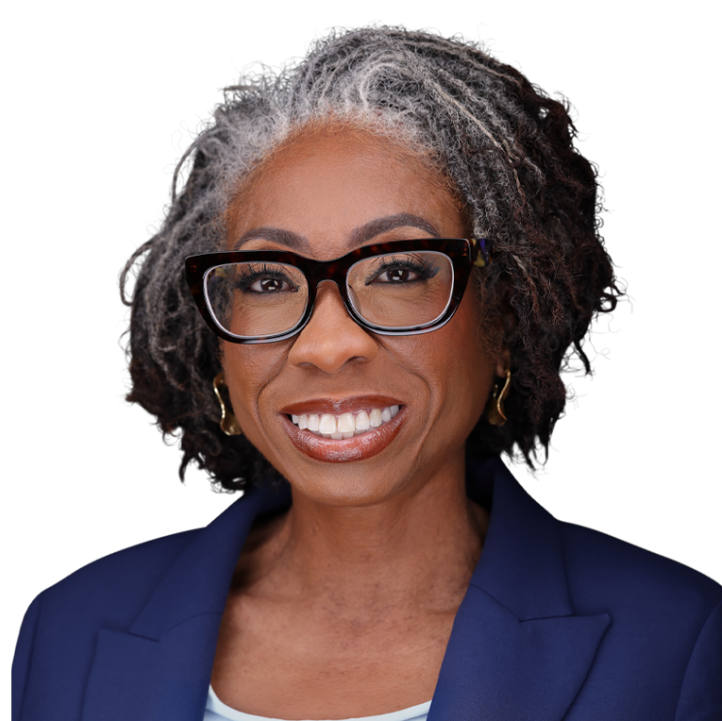

Vice Chair of the San Diego County Board of Supervisors
- Incumbent
- Assumed office July 22, 2025
- Preceded by: Terra Lawson-Remer

Member of the San Diego County Board of Supervisors from the 4th district
- Incumbent
- Assumed office December 5, 2023
- Preceded by: Nathan Fletcher

President pro tempore of the San Diego City Council
- In office December 6, 2021 – December 5, 2023
- Preceded by: Stephen Whitburn
- Succeeded by: Joe LaCava

Member of the San Diego City Council from the 4th district
- In office December 10, 2018 – December 5, 2023
- Preceded by: Myrtle Cole
- Succeeded by: Henry Foster III

Personal details
- Born: 1978 (age 47–48) San Diego, California, U.S.
- Party: Democratic
- Spouse: Steven Steppe (m. 2020)
- Education: Spelman College (BS); California Western School of Law (JD)
- Website: County Board website

Monica Montgomery Steppe (born 1978) is an American politician serving as a member of the San Diego County Board of Supervisors since 2023, representing District 4. A member of the Democratic Party, she previously served as a member of the San Diego City Council from 2018 to 2023, representing District 4, including as president pro tempore of the city council from 2021 to 2023, and on the board of the California Reparations Task Force.

== Life and career ==
Monica Montgomery was born in San Diego in 1978 to Clifford and Patricia Montgomery. She attended Bonita Vista High School. While in high school, she fought with school officials over a ban on wearing bandannas that she felt unfairly targeted the three percent of students who were Black. She earned a Bachelor of Science from Spelman College and a Juris Doctor degree from California Western School of Law.

Montgomery worked as a San Diego City Hall staffer for Councilmember Todd Gloria during his term as interim mayor, Mayor Kevin Faulconer, and Councilmember Myrtle Cole. She resigned from her position in Cole's office the day after Cole made remarks arguing police officers were justified in racially profiling Black residents. After leaving the City, Montgomery joined the ACLU of San Diego & Imperial Counties as a criminal justice advocate.

She married Steven Steppe on August 22, 2020.

== San Diego City Council ==
In 2013, Montgomery was a candidate in the special election to represent District 4 of the San Diego City Council following Tony Young's resignation to lead the local Red Cross Chapter. The district included the neighborhoods of Alta Vista, Broadway Heights, Chollas View, Emerald Hills, Encanto, Greater Skyline Hills, Jamacha, Lincoln Park, Lomita Village, North Bay Terrace, Oak Park, O'Farrell, Paradise Hills, Redwood Village, Rolando Park, South Bay Terrace, Valencia Park, and Webster. Montgomery was eliminated in the primary, coming in last in a field of nine candidates with three percent of the vote.

Montgomery ran again to represent District 4 in the 2018 San Diego City Council election, challenging her former boss Myrtle Cole. Montgomery cited wanting to guide policy around development in District 4 as well as Cole's previous comments on racial profiling as the two primary factors that led to her decision to run again. Montgomery came in a surprise first place in the June primary, six votes ahead of the incumbent Cole. Montgomery went on to win election to the City Council in the November 2018 runoff. This marked the first time that an incumbent had failed to be reelected to the City Council since 1992.

In 2023, she voted against a housing initiative to encourage construction of low-income housing in various San Diego neighborhoods, including those near UC San Diego college campuses.

== San Diego County Board of Supervisors ==
In April 2023, Montgomery Steppe began her campaign to replace Nathan Fletcher in a special election for District 4 of the San Diego County Supervisors. She had a plurality of votes on August 15, but since she did not surpass 50%, a runoff election was held in November, which she won by a wide margin. She became the second Black county supervisor after the retirement of Leon Williams in 1994.

== Electoral History ==
=== San Diego City Council ===
2013 San Diego City Council District 4 special election Vacancy resulting from the resignation of Tony Young
Primary election
Party	Candidate	Votes	%
Democratic	Myrtle Cole	4,304	32.3
Democratic	Dwayne Crenshaw	2,025	15.2
Democratic	Brian "Barry" Pollard	1,548	11.6
Democratic	Ray Smith	1,207	9.1
Democratic	Blanca Lopez Brown	1,084	8.1
Republican	Sandy Spackman	1,067	8.0
Democratic	Bruce Williams	1,059	8.0
Democratic	Tony Villafranca	621	4.7
Democratic	Monica Montgomery Steppe	404	3.0
Total votes		13,319	100
General election
Democratic	Myrtle Cole	6,612	54.1
Democratic	Dwayne Crenshaw	5,603	45.9
Total votes		12,215	100

2018 San Diego City Council District 4 general election
Candidate	Votes	%
Monica Montgomery	20,180	57.74
Myrtle Cole (incumbent)	14,769	42.26
Total votes	34,949	100

2022 San Diego City Council District 4 general election
Candidate	Votes	%
Monica Montgomery Steppe	17,878	69
Gloria Evangelista	8,112	31
Total votes	25,990	100

=== San Diego County Board of Supervisors ===
2023 San Diego County Board of Supervisors District 4 special primary election
Candidate	Votes	%
Monica Montgomery Steppe	40,165	41.70
Amy Reichert	27,781	28.84
Janessa Goldbeck	23,929	24.84
Paul McQuigg	4,452	4.62
Total votes	96,327	100

2023 San Diego County Board of Supervisors District 4 special general election
Candidate	Votes	%
Monica Montgomery Steppe	60,383	61.6
Amy Reichert	37,681	38.4
Total votes	98,064	100
