= List of special elections to the San Diego City Council =

Special elections to the San Diego City Council are called by the San Diego City Council when a vacancy arises on the Council with more than one year remaining in the term. Most special elections are conducted in two rounds. The first is an open primary and the candidate with the most votes must have a majority of the votes plus one to win the seat. If no candidate wins a majority a second round is held with the two top candidates regardless of party.

== List of special elections ==
The dates listed only include the open primary round if no second round was held.

District	Date	Predecessor	Winner
3	April 23, 1935	Alva Davis	Walter Wurfel
3	April 15, 1947	Elmer Blase	Paul Hartley
4	November 4, 1969	Tom Hom (R)	Leon Williams (D)
6	November 4, 1969	Jack Walsh (R)	Bob Martinet
3	November 8, 1983	Susan Golding (R)	Gloria McColl (R)
8	February 16, 1993	Bob Filner (D)	Juan Vargas (D)
8	September 21, 1993	Juan Vargas (D)	Juan Vargas (D)
8	February 27, 2001	Juan Vargas (D)	Ralph Inzunza (D)
6	June 5, 2001	Valerie Stallings (D)	Donna Frye (D)
4	January 4, 2005	Charles L. Lewis (D)	Tony Young (D)
2	January 10, 2006	Michael Zucchet (D)	Kevin Faulconer (R)
8	January 10, 2006	Ralph Inzunza (D)	Ben Hueso (D)
4	May 21, 2013	Tony Young (D)	Myrtle Cole (D)

=== List of recall elections ===
When applicable, the candidate who succeeded the recalled council member is listed. If the recall election was not successful the winner is listed as "none".

District	Date	Incumbent	Winner
5	April 9, 1991	Linda Bernhardt	Tom Behr

== Results ==
=== 2001 District 8 special election ===
2001 San Diego City Council District 8 special election Vacancy resulting from the resignation of Juan Vargas
Primary election
Party	Candidate	Votes	%
Democratic	Ralph Inzunza	4,759	62.10
Republican	Richard Babcock	714	9.32
Nonpartisan	Rafael Ramirez	606	7.91
Nonpartisan	David Gomez	325	4.24
Nonpartisan	Christian Ramirez	238	3.11
Nonpartisan	Gloria Tyler-Mallery	212	2.77
Nonpartisan	Kevin Hancock	168	2.19
Nonpartisan	Mary Arends-Biddlecome	164	2.14
Nonpartisan	Joe Ortega	164	2.14
Nonpartisan	Janice Jordan	138	1.80
Nonpartisan	Elias Rojas	117	1.53
Republican	Lincoln Pickard	59	0.77
Nonpartisan	Petra Barajas	12	0.15
Total votes		7,802	100

=== 2001 District 6 special election ===
2001 San Diego City Council District 6 special election Vacancy resulting from the resignation of Valerie Stallings
Primary election
Party	Candidate	Votes	%
Republican	Steve Danon	4,992	26.22
Democratic	Donna Frye	4,867	25.57
Nonpartisan	Michael Pallamary	3,573	18.77
Nonpartisan	Peter Navarro	1,494	7.85
Nonpartisan	Kim Cox	1,400	7.35
Nonpartisan	Gary Rotto	1,249	6.56
Nonpartisan	Larry L. Murray	569	2.99
Nonpartisan	Tom Switzer	450	2.36
Nonpartisan	Donald Mayes	299	1.57
Nonpartisan	Rick Richard	143	0.75
Nonpartisan	James Morrison (write-in)	12	0.06
Total votes		19,119	100
General election
Democratic	Donna Frye	12,259	52.25
Republican	Steve Danon	11,201	47.75
Total votes		23,564	100

=== 2004–2005 District 4 special election ===
Charles L. Lewis died in office while under federal indictment on charges of bribery and corruption as a result of the FBI investigation known as Operation G-Sting. Tony Young, previously Lewis' chief of staff, ran in the special election to replace him. Young advanced to the runoff after receiving the second most votes in the special primary election on November 16, 2004. He went on to win election by receiving the majority of votes in the special runoff election on January 4, 2005.

2004–2005 San Diego City Council District 4 special election Vacancy resulting from the death of Charles L. Lewis
Primary election
Party	Candidate	Votes	%
Democratic	George Stevens	4,615	34.29
Democratic	Tony Young	3,102	23.04
Democratic	Dwayne Crenshaw	2,898	21.54
Nonpartisan	Marissa Acierto	1,210	8.99
Republican	Bruce Williams	917	6.81
Nonpartisan	Jim Galley	260	1.93
Nonpartisan	Gloria Tyler-Mallery	252	1.87
Nonpartisan	Patrick DeShields	205	1.52
Total votes		13,459	100
General election
Democratic	Tony Young	6,911	59.42
Democratic	George Stevens	4,719	40.58
Total votes		11,630	100

=== 2005–2006 District 2 special election ===
Michael Zucchet resigned from office in July 2005 when he was convicted of corruption as a result of the FBI investigation known as Operation G-Sting, though he was later cleared of all charges. Kevin Faulconer, who had been the runner-up in the 2002 election against Zucchet, ran again in the crowded special election. He received the most votes in the primary election on November 8, 2005, and was elected with a majority of the votes in the runoff on January 10, 2006.

2005–2006 San Diego City Council District 2 special election Vacancy resulting from the resignation of Michael Zucchet
Primary election
Party	Candidate	Votes	%
Republican	Kevin Faulconer	15,912	34.44
Democratic	Lorena Gonzalez	11,543	24.98
Nonpartisan	Carolyn Chase	4,090	8.85
Nonpartisan	Rich Grosch	2,906	6.29
Nonpartisan	Tim Rutherford	2,442	5.29
Nonpartisan	Kathleen Blavatt	1,848	4.00
Nonpartisan	Ian Trowbridge	1,746	3.78
Nonpartisan	Pat Zaharopoulos	1,273	2.76
Nonpartisan	Phil Meinhardt	1,054	2.28
Nonpartisan	Tom Eaton	754	1.63
Nonpartisan	Greg Finley	615	1.33
Nonpartisan	David Diehl	470	1.02
Nonpartisan	James Joaquin Morrison	441	0.95
Nonpartisan	George Najjar	280	0.61
Nonpartisan	Robert E. Lee	250	0.54
Nonpartisan	Allen Hujsak	242	0.52
Nonpartisan	Linda Susan Finley	202	0.44
Total votes		52,154	100
General election
Republican	Kevin Faulconer	15,044	51.23
Democratic	Lorena Gonzalez	14,320	48.77
Total votes		29,448	100

=== 2005–2006 District 8 special election ===
Ralph Inzunza resigned from office in July 2005 when he was convicted of corruption as a result of the FBI investigation known as Operation G-Sting. Ben Hueso ran in the special election to replace Inzunza. He advanced to the special runoff election after receiving the plurality of the votes in the special primary on November 8, 2005. Hueso was elected to office with a majority of the votes in the runoff on January 10, 2006.

2005–2006 San Diego City Council District 8 special election Vacancy resulting from the resignation of Ralph Inzunza
Primary election
Party	Candidate	Votes	%
Democratic	Ben Hueso	7,454	38.15
Republican	Luis Acle	3,621	18.53
Nonpartisan	Remigia Bermudez	3,018	15.45
Nonpartisan	Dan Coffey	1,601	8.19
Nonpartisan	Kathy Vandenheuvel	1,060	5.43
Nonpartisan	Douglas Holbrook	800	4.09
Nonpartisan	Tim Gomez	775	3.97
Republican	Lincoln Pickard	595	3.05
Nonpartisan	Matthew Moncayo	537	2.75
Total votes		21,000	100
General election
Democratic	Ben Hueso	6,408	70.60
Republican	Luis Acle	2,600	28.65
Total votes		9,090	100

=== 2013 District 4 special election ===
On November 17, 2012, Council President Tony Young announced that he would resign from the City Council early to become CEO of the San Diego-Imperial Counties chapter of the American Red Cross, triggering a special election. Nine candidates qualified for the special primary election, scheduled for March 26, 2013. Myrtle Cole, who had been endorsed by the local Democratic Party and the San Diego-Imperial Counties Labor Council, received the most votes in the primary. She advanced to the May 21, 2013 general election to face runner-up Dwayne Crenshaw, Executive Director of San Diego LGBT Pride. Cole was elected to the City Council with a majority of the votes in the runoff.

2013 San Diego City Council District 4 special election Vacancy resulting from the resignation of Tony Young
Primary election
Party	Candidate	Votes	%
Democratic	Myrtle Cole	4,304	32.3
Democratic	Dwayne Crenshaw	2,025	15.2
Democratic	Brian "Barry" Pollard	1,548	11.6
Democratic	Ray Smith	1,207	9.1
Democratic	Blanca Lopez Brown	1,084	8.1
Republican	Sandy Spackman	1,067	8.0
Democratic	Bruce Williams	1,059	8.0
Democratic	Tony Villafranca	621	4.7
Democratic	Monica Montgomery	404	3.0
Total votes		13,319	100
General election
Democratic	Myrtle Cole	6,612	54.1
Democratic	Dwayne Crenshaw	5,603	45.9
Total votes		12,215	100
