= Myrtle Cole =

American politician

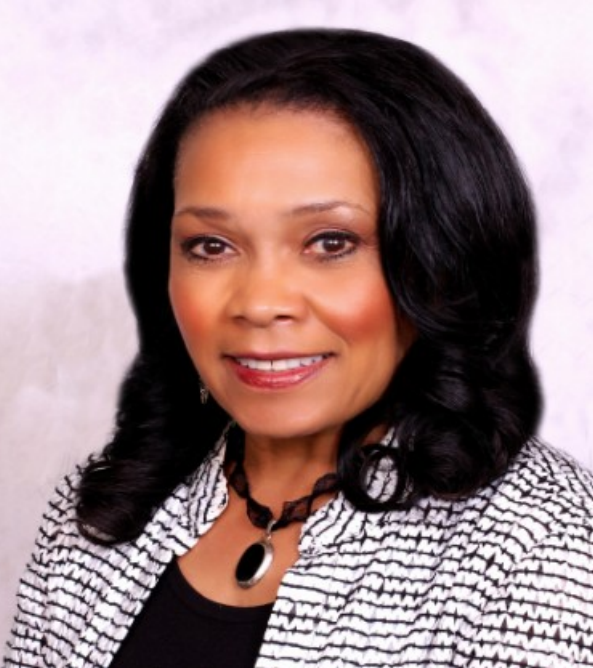

Member of the San Diego City Council for the District 4
- In office June 3, 2013 – December 10, 2018
- Mayor: Bob Filner; Kevin Faulconer
- Preceded by: Tony Young
- Succeeded by: Monica Montgomery

President of the San Diego City Council
- In office December 12, 2016 – December 10, 2018
- Preceded by: Sherri Lightner
- Succeeded by: Georgette Gomez

Personal details
- Party: Democratic
- Education: University of Arizona; National University
- Website: City Council District 4 website

Myrtle Cole is an American politician who served as a member of the San Diego City Council from 2013 to 2018, representing District 4. A member of the Democratic Party, Cole was the first African American woman elected to the city council and served as council president from 2017 to 2018. In 2018, Cole lost a bid for re-election, becoming one of the first incumbent council members to lose re-election since 1992.

== San Diego City Council ==
Myrtle Cole was first elected to office in the 2013 special election to fill the District 4 seat of the city council vacated by Tony Young,. District 4 includes the neighborhoods of Alta Vista, Broadway Heights, Chollas View, Emerald Hills, Encanto, Greater Skyline Hills, Jamacha, Lincoln Park, Lomita Village, North Bay Terrace, Oak Park, O'Farrell, Paradise Hills, Redwood Village, Rolando Park, South Bay Terrace, Valencia Park, and Webster. She won re-election to a four-year term in the June 2014 primary election, drawing 57% of the primary votes. Her second term began in December 2014.

In December 2016, Cole ran against fellow Democrat David Alvarez for the position of council president. The council president is responsible for setting the council's agenda and making committee assignments and chairmanships. Cole was chosen by her colleagues on a 6–3 vote, securing the votes of all four Republicans on the City Council as well as Democrat Barbara Bry. Although both Cole and Alvarez were Democrats, Cole was seen as the more moderate of the two.

In the November 2018 election, Cole lost her reelection bid to civil rights attorney and former staffer Monica Montgomery. This marked the first time that an incumbent had failed to be reelected to the City Council since 1992.

== Controversy and other information ==
Myrtle Cole received some criticism during her time on the San Diego City Council. For example, in 2016, she said, during a council meeting discussion of racial profiling by police, "There is more black on black shootings in our nation than ever before...That's why when someone says, 'Do you think there is racial profiling?' Yeah, because blacks are shooting blacks." Critics argue that this is what resulted in decreased support in her role in 2018.

In 2018, she was asked to speak at the National University Southern California Commencement as a National University Alumna. In addition to being the keynote speaker, she also received an honorary doctorate.

== Electoral history ==
San Diego City Council District 4 election, 2014
Primary election
Party	Candidate	Votes	%
Democratic	Myrtle Cole	6,921	57.00
Democratic	Bruce Williams	2,378	19.58
Nonpartisan	Blanca Lopez Brown	1,832	15.09
Nonpartisan	Tony Villafranca	1,011	8.33
Total votes		12,142	100

San Diego City Council District 4 special election, 2013
Primary election
Party	Candidate	Votes	%
Democratic	Myrtle Cole	4,304	32.3
Democratic	Dwayne Crenshaw	2,025	15.2
Democratic	Brian "Barry" Pollard	1,548	11.6
Democratic	Ray Smith	1,207	9.1
Democratic	Blanca Lopez Brown	1,084	8.1
Republican	Sandy Spackman	1,067	8.0
Democratic	Bruce Williams	1,059	8.0
Democratic	Tony Villafranca	621	4.7
Democratic	Monica Montgomery	404	3.0
Total votes		13,319	100
General election
Democratic	Myrtle Cole	6,612	54.1
Democratic	Dwayne Crenshaw	5,603	45.9
Total votes		12,215	100
