= Lorena Gonzalez (California politician) =

American politician (born 1971)

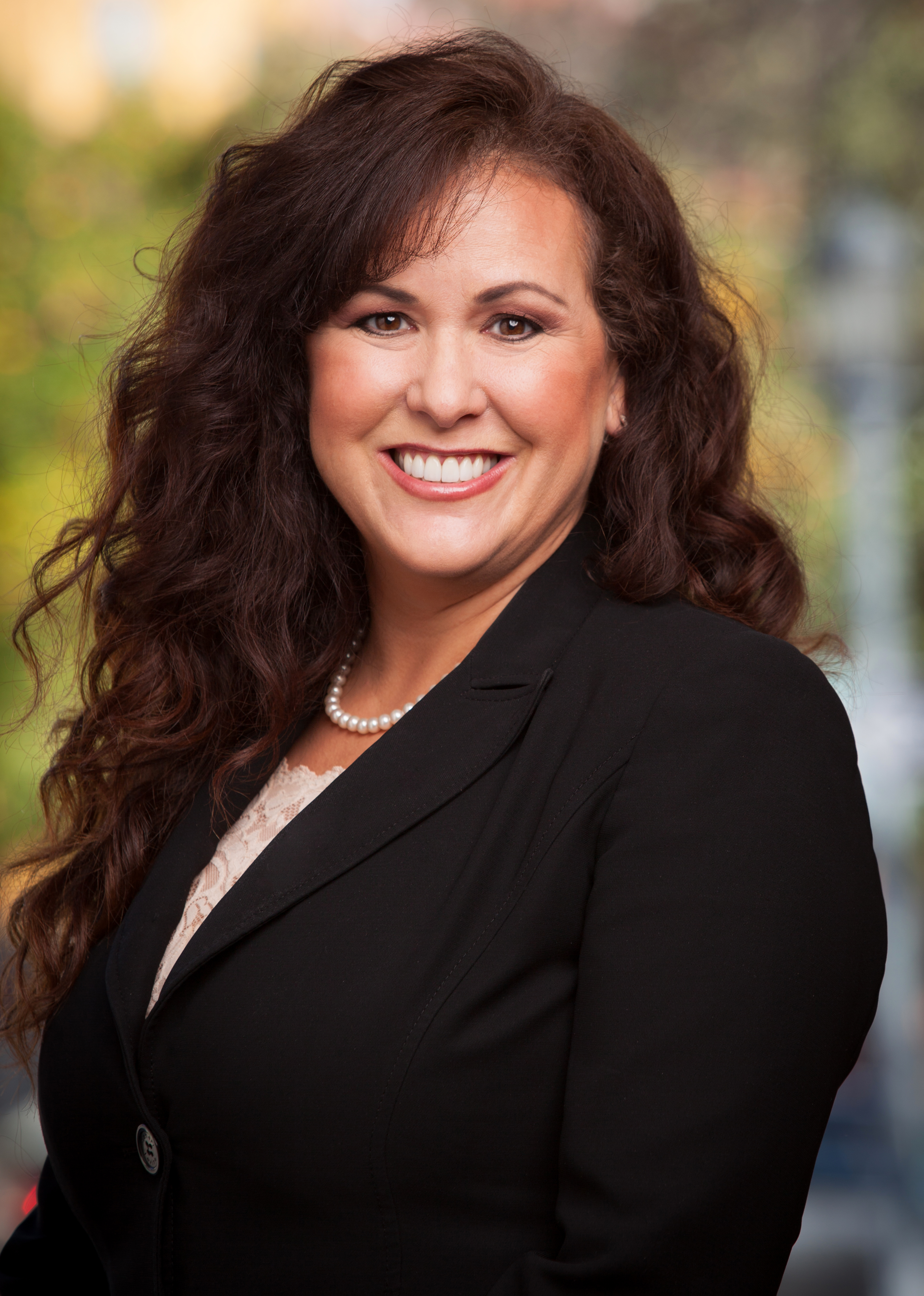
- Official portrait, 2013

President of the California Labor Federation
- Incumbent
- Assumed office July 27, 2022
- Preceded by: Art Pulaski

Member of the California State Assembly from the 80th district
- In office May 28, 2013 – January 5, 2022
- Preceded by: Ben Hueso
- Succeeded by: David Alvarez

Personal details
- Born: Lorena Sofia Gonzalez; September 16, 1971 (age 55) Oceanside, California, U.S.
- Party: Democratic
- Spouse: Nathan Fletcher (m. 2017)
- Children: 2
- Education: Stanford University (BA); Georgetown University (MA); University of California, Los Angeles (JD)

Lorena Sofia Gonzalez Fletcher (born September 16, 1971) is an American union leader and former politician serving as the president of the California Labor Federation since 2022. A member of the Democratic Party, she previously served in the California State Assembly from 2013 to 2022, representing the 80th Assembly district, which encompasses southern San Diego. She was first elected to the Assembly in a 2013 special election to succeed Ben Hueso, who was elected to the State Senate in a special election.

Gonzalez successfully sponsored and passed multiple pieces of legislation in California aimed at increasing healthcare access and putting more protections in place for workers. In 2016, she helped raise the minimum wage in California, which increased by $1 each year until full implementation at $15 per hour in 2022. She introduced Assembly Bill 5, which passed in September 2019 and required many workers to be classified as employees rather than independent contractors, providing them more protections under labor and minimum wage laws.

In January 2022, Gonzalez resigned from the state assembly to assume a leadership position in the California Labor Federation, AFL-CIO.

== Early life and education ==
Gonzalez attended public schools in San Diego County and graduated from Vista High School before earning a bachelor's degree from Stanford University, a master's degree from Georgetown University, and a Juris Doctor from the UCLA School of Law. Gonzalez served as Senior Adviser to former California Lieutenant Governor Cruz Bustamante, as well as an appointee to the California State Lands Commission and alternate on the California Coastal Commission. A community organizer and activist, Gonzalez was elected in 2008 as CEO and Secretary-Treasurer of the San Diego and Imperial Counties Labor Council, AFL-CIO.

== California government career ==
=== 2005 San Diego City Council race ===
Gonzalez ran for San Diego City Council during a 2005 special election and advanced to a runoff against future San Diego Mayor Kevin Faulconer. Gonzalez ultimately lost the race to Faulconer by a margin of 724 votes out of 29,448 cast.

=== California State Assembly ===
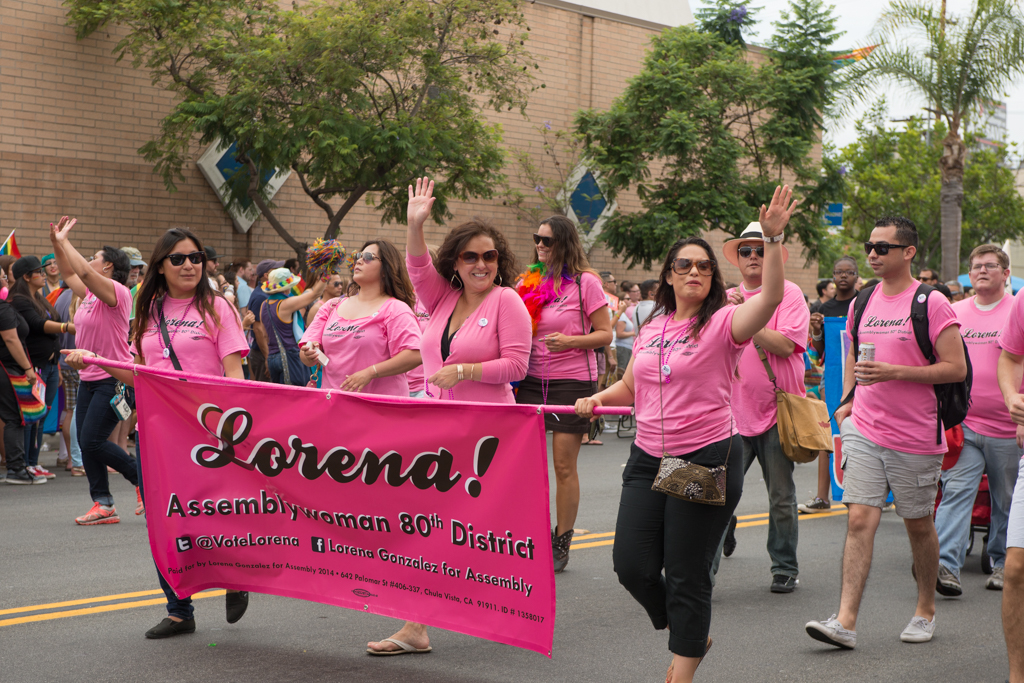
Lorena Gonzalez marching in the 2014 San Diego LGBT Pride Parade

Gonzalez was elected to California's 80th State Assembly district in a special election held May 21, 2013. She defeated former Chula Vista Councilmember Steve Castaneda with 71% of the vote.

She served as chair of the California Latino Legislative Caucus, and became the first Latina to ever serve as the chair of the Assembly Appropriations Committee in 2016. Gonzalez also served on the Assembly Committee on Education, the Assembly Committee on Health, the Assembly Committee on Insurance, the Assembly Committee on Water, Parks and Wildlife; and the Assembly Committee on Rules. She was also the first Chair of the Select Committee on Women in the Workplace.

On January 3, 2022, Gonzalez announced that she would be resigning from the state Assembly to take a job at the California Labor Federation.

==== Legislation ====
Gonzalez created AB 746, which requires public schools to test their drinking water for lead. This legislation was signed into law by Governor Brown in 2017. Gonzalez sponsored a law requiring school children to get vaccinated unless they have a medical exemption.

Gonzalez sponsored AB 2051, which makes it easier for affiliate primary care clinics to enroll into Medi-Cal and Family Planning, Access, Care and Treatment. Gonzalez sponsored AB 2347, which requires specific notices to be placed on the cover page of annuities and life insurance policies.

AB 250, which will help promote more low-cost lodging options along California's coast. Gonzalez sponsored AB 2104, which allows residents to implement drought-tolerant landscaping without drawing penalties from homeowners associations.

In 2018, Gonzalez sponsored AB 1584, which banned the unusual and possibly unconstitutional San Diego Police Department policy of regularly taking DNA samples from minors without first getting parental permission, a warrant or a conviction, and uploading that information to their database for later reference. The bill passed with unanimous support in January 2018. Gonzalez has also created legislation that allows a person to challenge a criminal plea if that person has already served the punishment and was not properly advised of the plea's impact on his or her immigration status.

Gonzalez's AB 805 legislation brought a series of reforms to San Diego County's regional transportation agency and the San Diego Association of Governments.

Gonzalez authored bills streamlining the state's voter-registration process, has enabled voters to designate any person of their choosing to return a completed mail ballot to the proper drop-off location or post office. Other bills introduced by Gonzalez and signed into law in 2014 include AB 1873, which allows San Diego County to fill special election vacancies for Congress and the state Legislature by mail ballot until 2020.

===== Labor =====
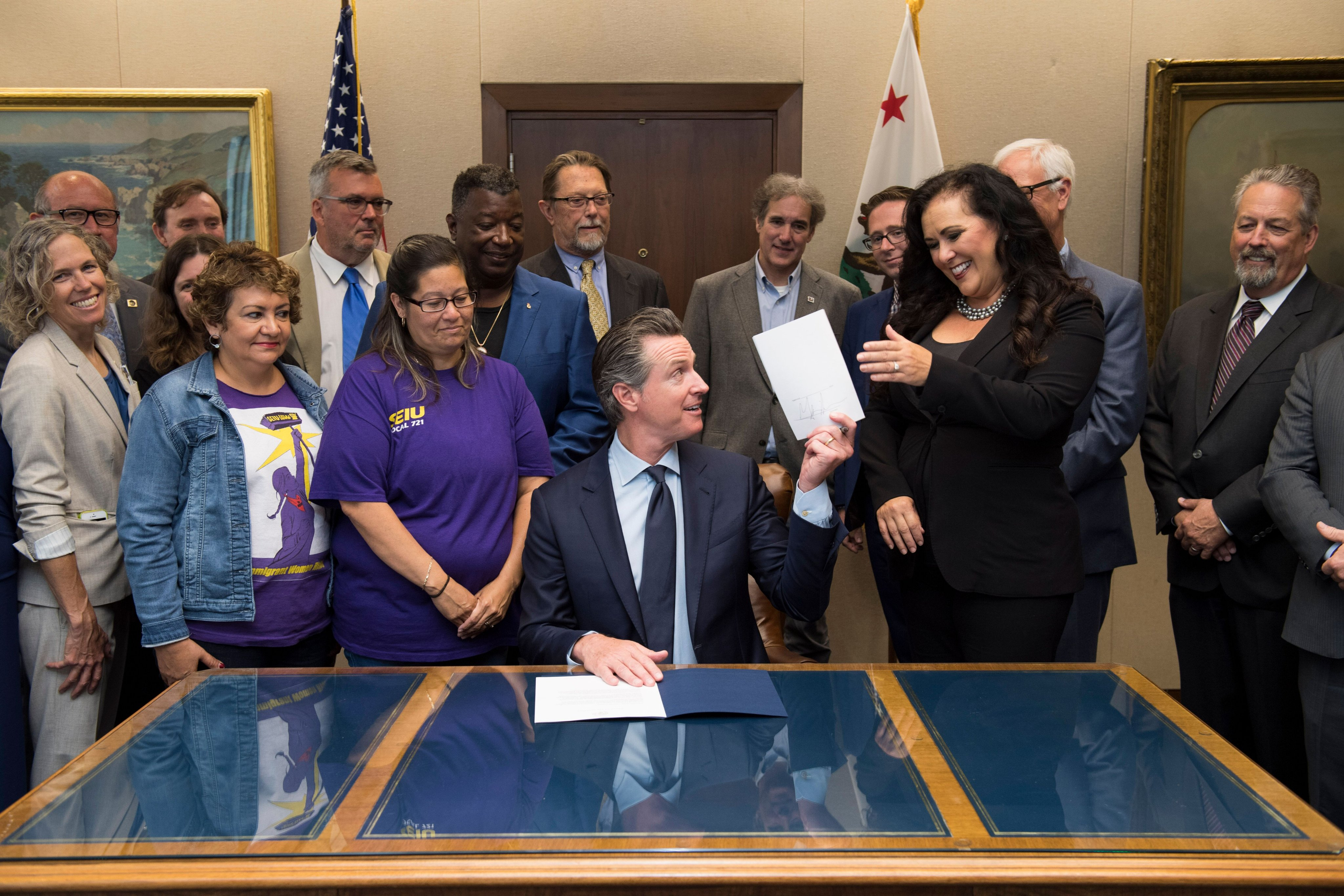
California Governor Gavin Newsom with Gonzalez at the signing of AB5 in 2019.

Gonzalez advocated to raise the state's minimum wage to $15/hour, which passed and raised the wage by $1/year until it was fully implemented across the state in 2022. She introduced AB 5, which passed in September 2019 and would require many workers to be reclassified as employees instead of independent contractors, giving them minimum wage protections and benefits such as sick leave.

Among some of the signature pieces of legislation authored by Gonzalez are bills enabling millions of Californians to earn paid sick leave and making hundreds of thousands of California farmworkers eligible for overtime pay. Gonzalez has also authored legislation designed to close the gender pay gap as well as AB 2053, which adds instructions on abusive conduct (bullying) to workplace sexual harassment training.

In January 2014, Gonzalez introduced AB 1522, which requires employers grant sick days to part-time employees. The legislation was signed by Governor Jerry Brown in September 2014, granting paid sick leave to about 6.5 million Californians. In 2015, Gonzalez introduced a measure that would require double pay when a company makes workers come in on the Christmas or Thanksgiving holidays. In 2016, Gonzalez successfully passed a bill to protect janitorial workers from sexual harassment. She also authored a variety of bills signed by Gov. Jerry Brown. Among these were bills to ensure that anyone injured in California receives fair and just civil compensation regardless of their immigration status. She also created legislation that helped ensure nail-salon owners and employees are better-educated about workers’ rights.

In 2017, Gonzalez authored AB 480, which was signed into law and enables certain parents who participate in the state's welfare-to-work program to become eligible for subsidies to afford diapers for their children.

Also in 2017, she authored – and the governor signed – AB 1221, which requires that bartenders receive training to recognize when a customer has had too much to drink. She authored this bill after two University of California at San Diego medical-school students were killed by a drunk driver.

In May 2020, Gonzalez criticized Elon Musk for opening Tesla, Inc. during the COVID-19 pandemic in California, and for threatening to move Tesla out of California because of the state's factory re-opening restrictions. She also sent out a tweet that said 'F--k Elon Musk'. Tesla subsequently announced on October 7, 2021, that it was moving its headquarters from California to Austin, Texas.

== Personal life ==
In 2011, Gonzalez's home was vandalized following the publication of a right wing blog critical of her "rich and famous lifestyle" written by secretary of the San Diego County Republican Party. She alleged receiving other online threats, as well.

On January 1, 2017, Gonzalez married former assemblyman Nathan Fletcher; the two had been dating since 2015. As of 2014, Gonzalez lived in the City Heights neighborhood of San Diego with her husband and his children from his previous marriage

On August 7, 2021, she announced that she had been diagnosed with stage 0 breast cancer and would maintain her normal duties while seeking aggressive treatment.

On January 15, 2022, a fire broke out on the front of the couple's home in the early morning. The family was awakened by smoke alarms and was able to leave the house through a side door. No one was injured, but the fire caused an estimated $36,000 in damage. The fire was described by police as "suspicious". A San Diego police investigation concluded that the fire was deliberately set and offered a $1,000 reward for help in identifying the arsonist.

== Election results ==
=== San Diego City Council ===
2005–2006 San Diego City Council District 2 special election Vacancy resulting from the resignation of Michael Zucchet
Primary election
Party	Candidate	Votes	%
Republican	Kevin Faulconer	15,912	34.44
Democratic	Lorena Gonzalez	11,543	24.98
Nonpartisan	Carolyn Chase	4,090	8.85
Nonpartisan	Rich Grosch	2,906	6.29
Nonpartisan	Tim Rutherford	2,442	5.29
Nonpartisan	Kathleen Blavatt	1,848	4.00
Nonpartisan	Ian Trowbridge	1,746	3.78
Nonpartisan	Pat Zaharopoulos	1,273	2.76
Nonpartisan	Phil Meinhardt	1,054	2.28
Nonpartisan	Tom Eaton	754	1.63
Nonpartisan	Greg Finley	615	1.33
Nonpartisan	David Diehl	470	1.02
Nonpartisan	James Joaquin Morrison	441	0.95
Nonpartisan	George Najjar	280	0.61
Nonpartisan	Robert E. Lee	250	0.54
Nonpartisan	Allen Hujsak	242	0.52
Nonpartisan	Linda Susan Finley	202	0.44
Total votes		52,154	100
General election
Republican	Kevin Faulconer	15,044	51.23
Democratic	Lorena Gonzalez	14,320	48.77
Total votes		29,448	100

=== 2013 California State Assembly Special Election ===
California's 80th State Assembly district special election, 2013 Vacancy resulting from the resignation of Ben Hueso
Primary election
Party	Candidate	Votes	%
Democratic	Lorena Gonzalez	18,125	71.2
Democratic	Steve Castaneda	6,646	26.1
Libertarian	Kaiden Degas (write-in)	548	2.2
Republican	Lincoln Pickard (write-in)	140	0.5
Total votes		25,459	100.0
Democratic hold			

=== 2014 California State Assembly ===
California's 80th State Assembly district election, 2014
Primary election
Party	Candidate	Votes	%
Democratic	Lorena Gonzalez (incumbent)	25,953	100
Total votes		25,953	100
General election
Democratic	Lorena Gonzalez (incumbent)	43,362	100
Total votes		43,362	100
Democratic hold			

=== 2016 California State Assembly ===
California's 80th State Assembly district election, 2016
Primary election
Party	Candidate	Votes	%
Democratic	Lorena Gonzalez (incumbent)	55,150	75
Republican	Lincoln Pickard	14,015	19
No party preference	Louis J. Marinelli	4,753	6
Total votes		73,918	100
General election
Democratic	Lorena Gonzalez (incumbent)	84,780	77
Republican	Lincoln Pickard	25,703	23
Total votes		110,483	100

=== 2018 California State Assembly ===
California's 80th State Assembly district election, 2018
Primary election
Party	Candidate	Votes	%
Democratic	Lorena Gonzalez Fletcher (incumbent)	38,449	71
Republican	Lincoln Pickard	16,107	29
Republican	Joseph Viveiros (write-in)	3	0
Total votes		54,559	100
General election
Democratic	Lorena Gonzalez Fletcher (incumbent)	82,621	75
Republican	Lincoln Pickard	27,563	25
Total votes		110,184	100
Democratic hold			

=== 2020 California State Assembly ===
2020 California's 80th State Assembly district election
Primary election
Party	Candidate	Votes	%
Democratic	Lorena Gonzalez (incumbent)	56,872	73
Republican	John J. Vogel	13,999	18
Republican	Lincoln Pickard	7,334	9
Total votes		78,205	100
General election
Democratic	Lorena Gonzalez (incumbent)	121,611	71.5
Republican	John J. Vogel	48,390	28.5
Total votes		170,051	100
