= George Stevens (California politician) =

American politician (1932–1991)

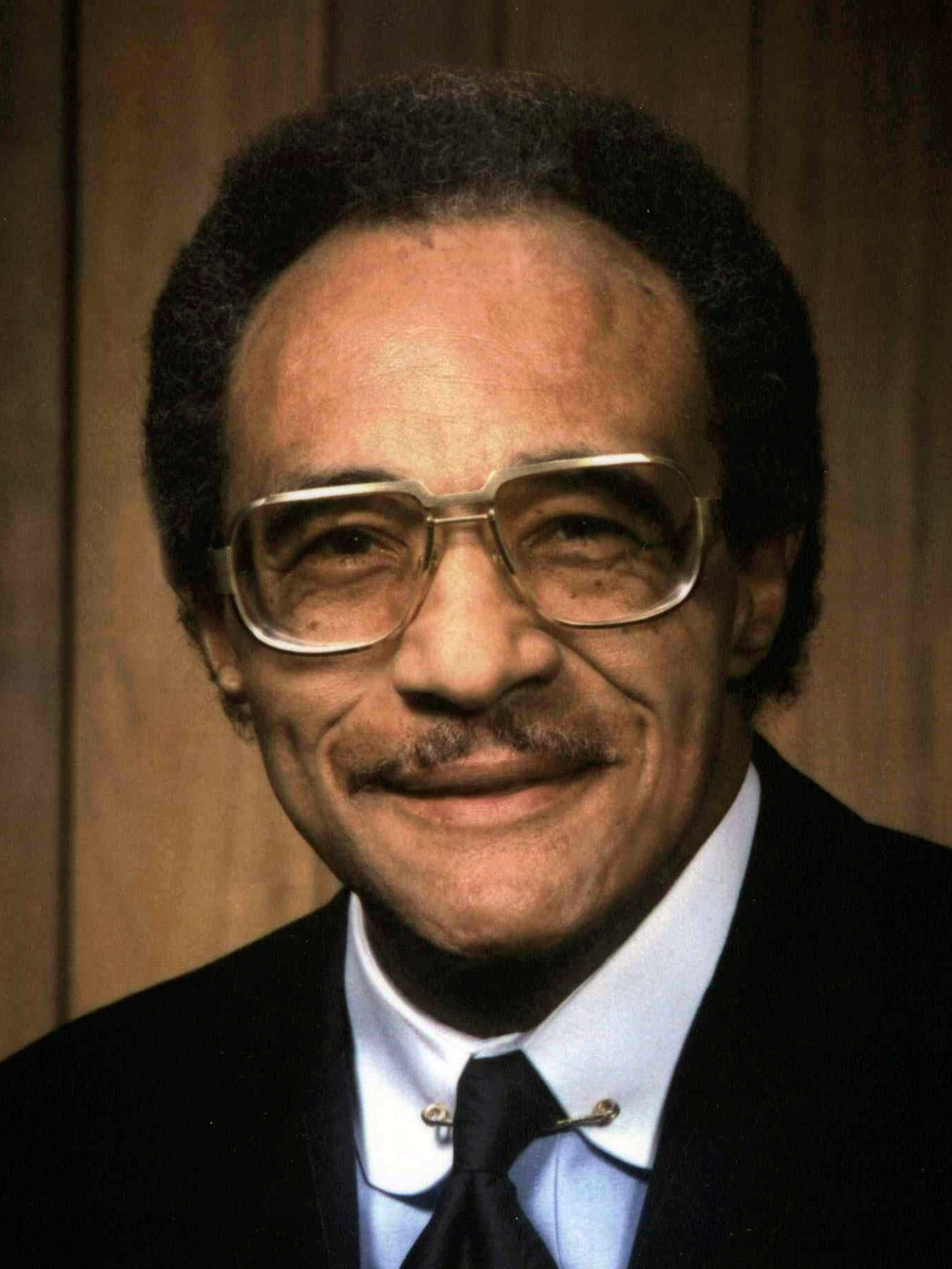
- Official portrait, 1995

Member of San Diego City Council from the 4th district
- In office September 17, 1991 – March 5, 2002
- Preceded by: Wes Pratt
- Succeeded by: Charles L. Lewis III

Personal details
- Born: George Luther Stevens; February 6, 1932 Junction City, Louisiana, U.S.
- Died: October 15, 2006 (aged 74) San Diego, California, U.S.
- Party: Democratic
- Spouse: Brenda Stevens
- Children: 4

George Luther Stevens (February 6, 1932 – October 15, 2006) was an American Baptist minister, civil rights activist, and politician who served as a member of the San Diego City Council. He was a Democrat, although city council positions are officially nonpartisan per California state law.

== Early life and education ==
George Luther Stevens was born in Junction City, Louisiana and grew up poor. When he was 13, he and his family moved to El Centro, California. He moved to San Diego in the 1950s.

== Career ==
=== Ministry and activism ===
He was an associate pastor at the Mount Erie Baptist Church in San Diego. He had personally experienced discrimination in the 1950s when a builder refused to sell a house to him. In the 1960s he participated in demonstrations against discriminatory hiring practices and was arrested several times for occupying the offices of targeted companies.

=== Politics ===
From 1974 until 1990 he worked for San Diego County Supervisor and later Congressman Jim Bates.

He ran unsuccessfully for City Council in 1965 (during the campaign someone burned a cross on his lawn) and again in 1987. He was elected in 1991 to represent District 4 on the City Council. He served from 1991 through 2002, when he was forced out by term limits. As councilman he lobbied hard to bring public and private amenities for his district, which he believed had been neglected by the city for years. Resulting facilities in his district included the Malcolm X Library, Tubman-Chavez Multicultural Center, and an apprenticeship center for the Black Contractors Association.

After retiring from the City Council, he ran for California State Assembly in 2002, but lost in the Democratic primary to Vince Hall. After the election he went to work for Republican Assemblywoman Shirley Horton, who had defeated Hall in the general election. He continued working for Horton until a few days before his death on October 15, 2006.

After the death in office of his successor on the city council, Charles L. Lewis, Stevens ran for re-election to the District 4 seat in a 2005 special election. However, he lost to Tony Young, who had been Lewis's chief of staff.

== Personal life ==
He and his wife Brenda had a daughter and three sons.

== Recognition ==
The George L. Stevens Senior Center in Encanto is named for him.
