= Donna Frye =

American politician (born 1952)

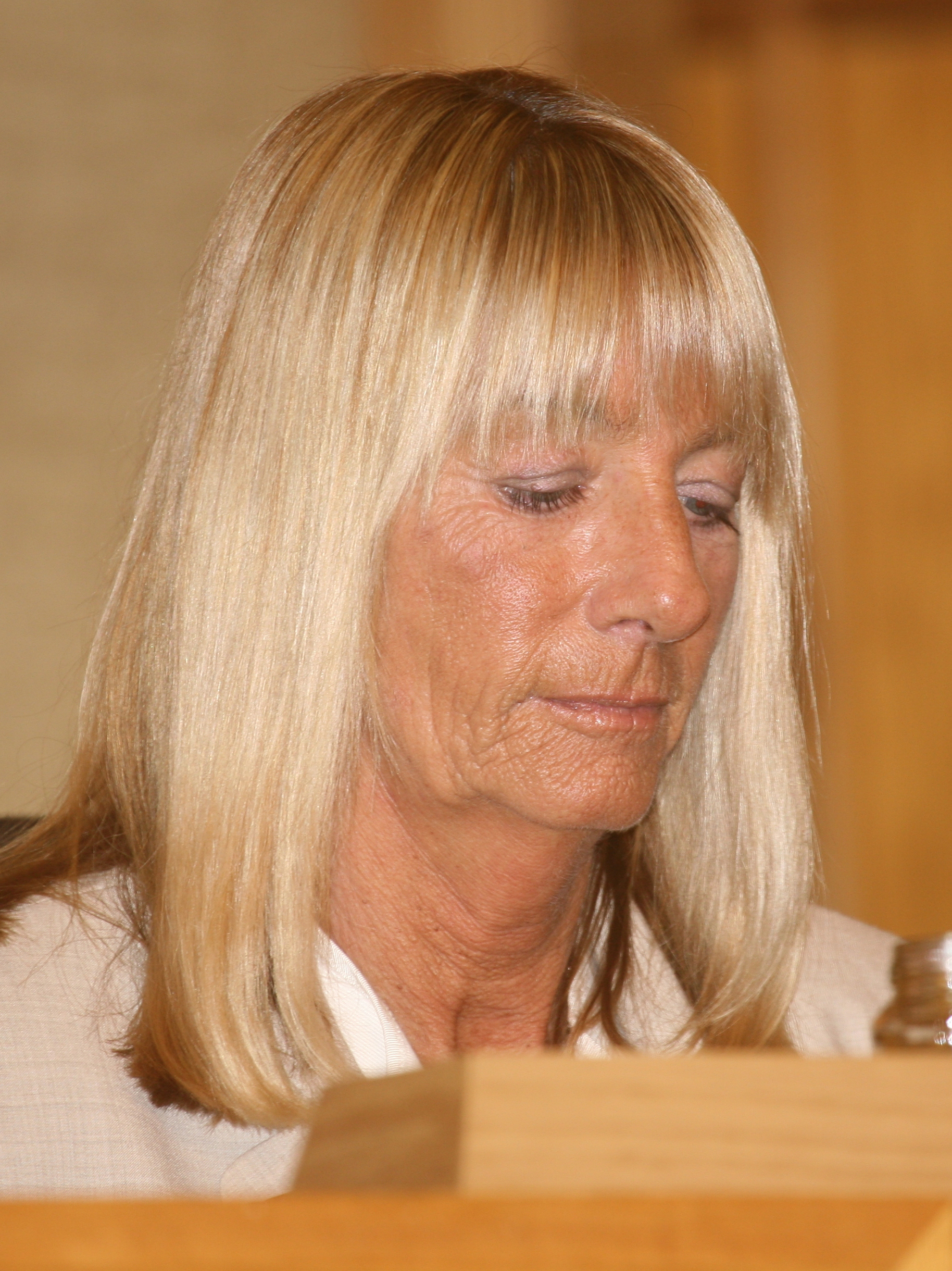
- Donna Frye at a city council meeting, 2008

Member of the San Diego City Council from the 6th district
- In office June 2001 – December 6, 2010
- Preceded by: Valerie Stallings
- Succeeded by: Lorie Zapf

Personal details
- Born: January 20, 1952 (age 74) Pennsylvania, U.S.
- Party: Democratic
- Spouse: Skip Frye
- Education: National University
- Profession: Businessperson

Donna Frye (born January 20, 1952) is an American politician who served as a member of the San Diego City Council from 2001 to 2010, representing District 6. A member of the Democratic Party, she was twice an unsuccessful candidate for mayor of San Diego and was among the first to call on then-San Diego mayor Bob Filner to resign over accusations of sexual harassment and assault.

== Early life ==
Frye was born in 1952 in Pennsylvania, the second of three children. Her family moved to San Diego when her father took a civilian job with the Navy.

After a failed first marriage in late 1979, Frye had problems with alcohol abuse. That changed within months of meeting her current husband Skip Frye at a Mexican restaurant in December 1980, and Frye stopped drinking in early 1981. In 1988, they opened a custom-made surfboard shop in Pacific Beach and they married in 1990.

== Political career ==
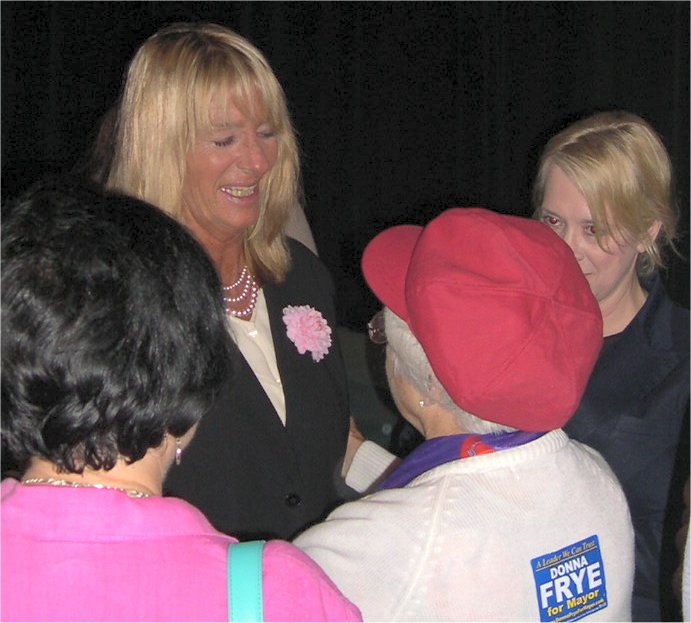
Donna Frye speaking to supporters during the 2005 mayoral campaign

Frye first became concerned with coastal water pollution problems when her husband repeatedly became sick after surfing. She soon became an environmental and community leader. In 2001 she was elected to the San Diego City Council in a special election. She was later elected to full term on the council in the regular 2002 city council elections.

Frye ran for mayor of San Diego in the November 2004 run-off election between Dick Murphy and Ron Roberts as a write-in candidate, without having run in the primary. A plurality of voters wrote in her name, but a controversy arose when she lost the election because a number of voters did not fill in the bubble next to her written name or misspelled her name (usually spelling her last name "Fry"). If those votes had counted, Frye would have had more votes than either of the moderate Republican candidates officially in the runoff, but still far below a majority vote. Whether Frye would have been allowed to serve as mayor in any case is uncertain, as her write-in candidacy was at odds with the San Diego City Charter.

Dick Murphy was re-elected as mayor after a series of legal challenges to the election results, but resigned on July 15, 2005, as the city's fiscal crisis and legal woes with regulatory and law enforcement agencies like the Securities and Exchange Commission and Federal Bureau of Investigation worsened and became a matter of increasing public awareness.

Frye ran for mayor in the special election that took place on July 26, 2005, with a platform advocating open and honest government and restoring order to the city's financial situation, points found in nearly all of the candidates' platforms. Frye was endorsed by Mike Aguirre, the city attorney who has confronted the city council over releasing documents.

Frye placed ahead of ten opponents, including former police chief and runner-up Jerry Sanders (27%), by receiving 43% of the vote. However, a majority was needed to win outright, and so a run-off election was held between Frye and Sanders on November 8, 2005. Frye was defeated in this election, receiving 46.1% of the vote to Sanders' 53.9%. She did, however, win reelection to her council seat in the 2006 city council elections, retiring in 2010 due to term limits.

== Post-political career ==
In December 2012, Frye joined the administration of San Diego mayor Bob Filner in a new position he created called Director of Open Government. She resigned in April 2013 to become president of Californians Aware, a nonprofit that advocates for open government statewide.

In July 2013 she and two other former supporters of Filner publicly called on Filner to resign as mayor, alleging that he had sexually harassed numerous unnamed women by forcibly kissing them, fondling them and making sexually suggestive remarks. Though refusing at first to step down, Filner eventually resigned in August 2013. In October of that year, he pleaded guilty to state charges of false imprisonment and misdemeanor battery.

== Recognition ==
Frye was nominated and inducted into the San Diego County's Women's Hall of Fame in 2011 for the 'Spirit 2011' title. The Hall of Fame's aim is to "acknowledge and honor women who have significantly contributed to the quality of life and who have made outstanding volunteer contributions in San Diego County." The annual Women's Hall of Fame induction is co-hosted by Women's Museum of California (Located in San Diego), Commission on the Status of Women, UC San Diego Women's Center, and San Diego State Women's Studies.
