= Ralph Inzunza =

American politician (born 1969)

Member of San Diego City Council representing the Eighth District
- In office March 2001 – July 2005
- Preceded by: Juan Vargas
- Succeeded by: Ben Hueso

Personal details
- Born: c. 1969
- Party: Democratic

Ralph Inzunza (born c. 1969) is a former city councilman from San Diego. He was elected in March 2001 to represent City Council District 8. He resigned in July 2005 along with Councilman Michael Zucchet after both were convicted on federal corruption charges. The conviction against Zucchet was overturned on November 10, 2005, citing lack of evidence. However, the convictions against the two co-defendants were upheld.

== Personal life ==
Inzunza graduated from Saint Augustine High School in San Diego in 1987. He comes from a political family. His father, Ralph Inzunza Sr., was a city councilman in National City and his brother Nick served as National City mayor.

== City Council ==
Inzunza served as chief of staff to his predecessor as city councilman, Juan Vargas. Vargas resigned in 2001 after being elected to the California State Assembly and Inzunza won in a special election to replace him, receiving 70 percent of the vote. He was re-elected to a full term in the 2002 elections.

One of Inzunza's first actions as a city councilman was to challenge the way Mayor Dick Murphy was making appointments to an Ethics Committee. The mayor eventually agreed to give the City Council more of a role in the process. Murphy later named him Deputy Mayor and appointed him to the San Diego County Regional Airport Authority. Inzunza also fought against the expansion of a homeless facility in his district.

== Federal charges ==
Inzunza and two other city councilmen, Charles L. Lewis and Michael Zucchet, were indicted on August 23, 2003, on federal charges of extortion, wire fraud, and conspiracy to commit wire fraud for taking campaign contributions from a strip club owner and his associates, allegedly in exchange for trying to repeal the city's "no touch" laws at strip clubs. Inzunza and Zucchet were convicted by a jury on July 18, 2005; the conviction forced them both to resign from the city council. Inzunza filed multiple appeals for the next six years while working as a consultant for nonprofit agencies. Finally in January 2012 his final appeal was denied and he was ordered to start serving a 21-month prison sentence. Zucchet's conviction was overturned November 10, 2005 and on September 1, 2009, the Ninth U.S. Circuit Court of Appeals upheld Zucchet's acquittals emphasizing the lack of evidence against him. Inzunza served time in a federal penitentiary in Atwater, California and was released in April 2013.
