= Kevin Faulconer =

Mayor of San Diego from 2014 to 2020

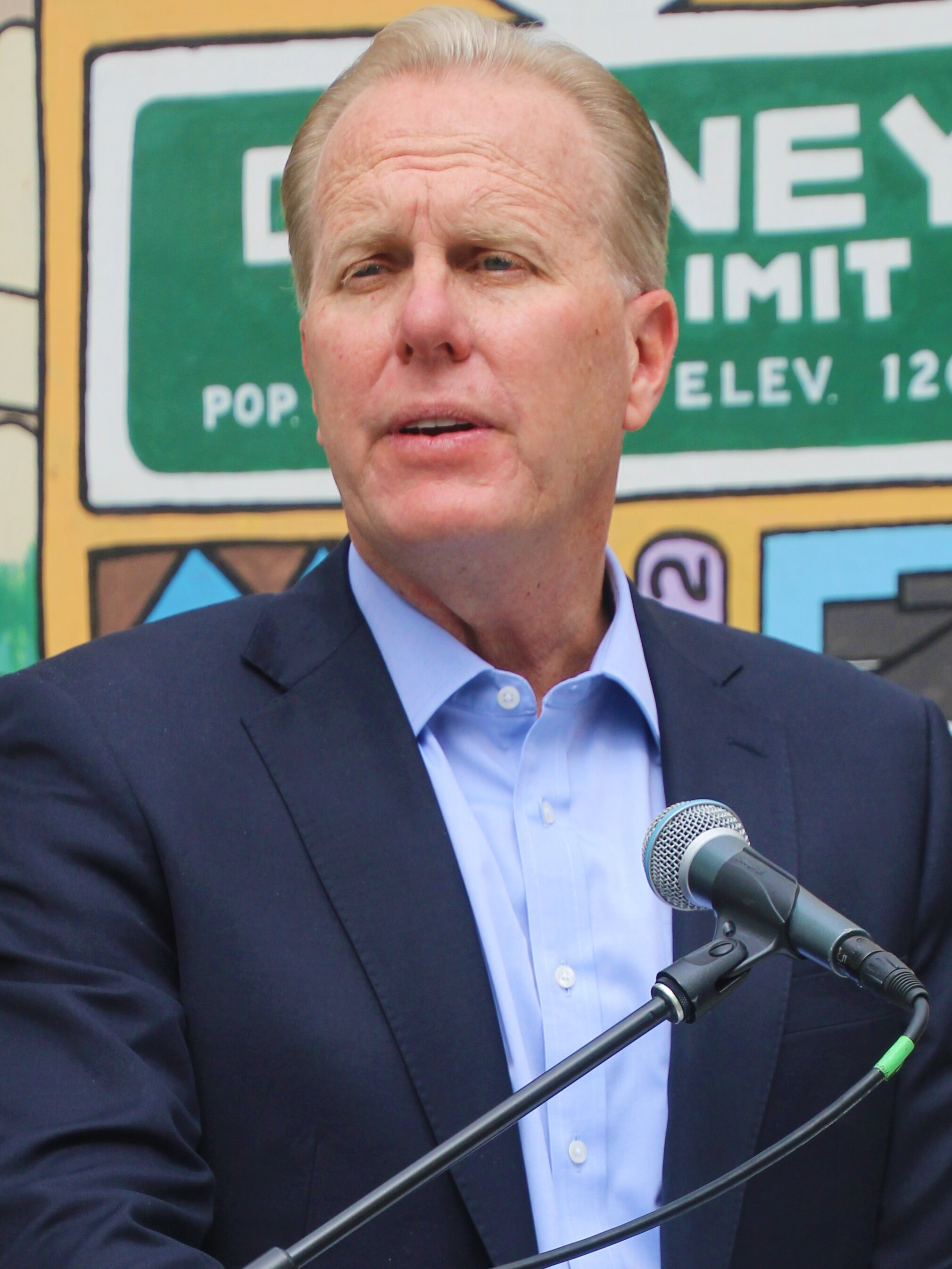
- Faulconer in 2021

36th Mayor of San Diego
- In office March 3, 2014 – December 10, 2020
- Preceded by: Todd Gloria (Acting)
- Succeeded by: Todd Gloria

Member of the San Diego City Council from the 2nd district
- In office January 10, 2006 – March 3, 2014
- Preceded by: Michael Zucchet
- Succeeded by: Ed Harris

Personal details
- Born: Kevin Lee Faulconer; January 24, 1967 (age 59) San Jose, California, U.S.
- Party: Republican
- Spouse: Katherine Stuart (m. 1999)
- Children: 2
- Education: San Diego State University (BA)

Kevin Lee Faulconer (born January 24, 1967) is an American politician who served as the 36th mayor of San Diego, from 2014 to 2020. A member of the Republican Party, Faulconer served as the member of the San Diego City Council for the 2nd district from 2006 to 2014.

Faulconer was born in San Jose, California, and grew up in Oxnard. He entered politics in the 1990s to work on the campaigns for then-Governor Pete Wilson; he began to run in San Diego City Council elections to represent the 2nd district in the early 2000s. He was elected in a 2005 special election and was re-elected in landslides in 2006 and in 2010. In late 2013, he announced his candidacy for the mayorship of San Diego which he later won. He was sworn in on March 3, 2014. He was re-elected in 2016, but he was not eligible to run in the 2020 election due to term limits.

Faulconer is considered to be a moderate Republican, holding fiscally conservative and socially liberal views. He announced his candidacy for governor of California on February 1, 2021, and was one of the main candidates in the 2021 gubernatorial recall election, placing third in a field of 46 replacement candidates.

== Early life and education ==
Faulconer was born in San Jose, California, to Jim and Kay Faulconer (née Boger), an assistant city manager of Oxnard and an instructor at Oxnard College and Ventura College, respectively. He grew up in Oxnard and learned Spanish while in grade school. Faulconer graduated from Oxnard High School in 1985. He later enrolled in and graduated from San Diego State University with a degree in political science. While at San Diego State, Faulconer served as student body president as a fifth-year senior and was a member of Kappa Sigma fraternity.

== Early career ==
After college, Faulconer won a fellowship with the Coro Foundation and worked for Solem & Associates, a public relations firm based in San Francisco. He later helped work on the campaigns for California governor Pete Wilson.

== San Diego City Council (2006–2014) ==
=== Elections ===
Faulconer ran in the 2002 city council election for District 2 but lost to Michael Zucchet in a hotly contested election. After Zucchet resigned in 2005, a special election was held that November. There were 17 candidates and none got a majority, so a runoff was held on January 10, 2006, between the two top vote-getters, Faulconer and Lorena Gonzalez. Faulconer won the runoff with 51.5% of the vote.

Faulconer was elected to a full term in June 2006 and re-elected in June 2010; in both cases he won an outright majority in the primary and so did not have to run in the November general election. He was ineligible to run for re-election in 2014 per city term limits.

=== Tenure ===
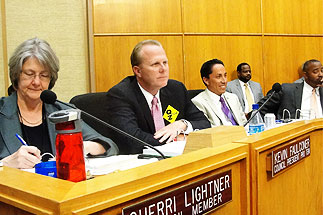
Faulconer seated with the San Diego City Council in 2010.

Although Faulconer was once a supporter of alcohol being allowed on public beaches in San Diego (his 2006 opponent Gonzalez supported a limited ban), he changed his opinion after winning the city council election. Following an alcohol-fueled riot at Pacific Beach in 2007, he persuaded the city council to pass a trial one-year ban on alcohol at the beaches; the next year the ban was made permanent by a citywide vote. The ban has not been challenged since with the community generally approving of cleaner beaches and fewer emergency calls, and lifeguards and police said it has made their jobs easier. However, the long-term economic impact, claimed by one individual to be a 160,000 person reduction in attendance on holiday weekends and a 50% drop in revenue for beach businesses, has not been studied.

In the fall of 2006, over 30 bars and restaurants in Pacific Beach agreed with one another to limit the offering of discounts on alcoholic drinks. Faulconer supported the price-fixing agreement and spoke at the press conference announcing the agreement.

He campaigned against a proposed sales tax increase in 2010. He promoted the North Embarcadero Visionary Plan, a project seeking to redevelop the San Diego bayfront. He pushed for several years for an ordinance limiting the parking of oversize vehicles on the streets; the ordinance finally passed the city council in July 2013.

Faulconer was chair of the council's Audit Committee, which is charged with clearing out an audit backlog and restoring the city's credit rating. He was vice-chair of the Rules and Economic Development Committee and a member of the Budget and Finance Committee.

== Mayor of San Diego (2014–2020) ==
=== Elections ===
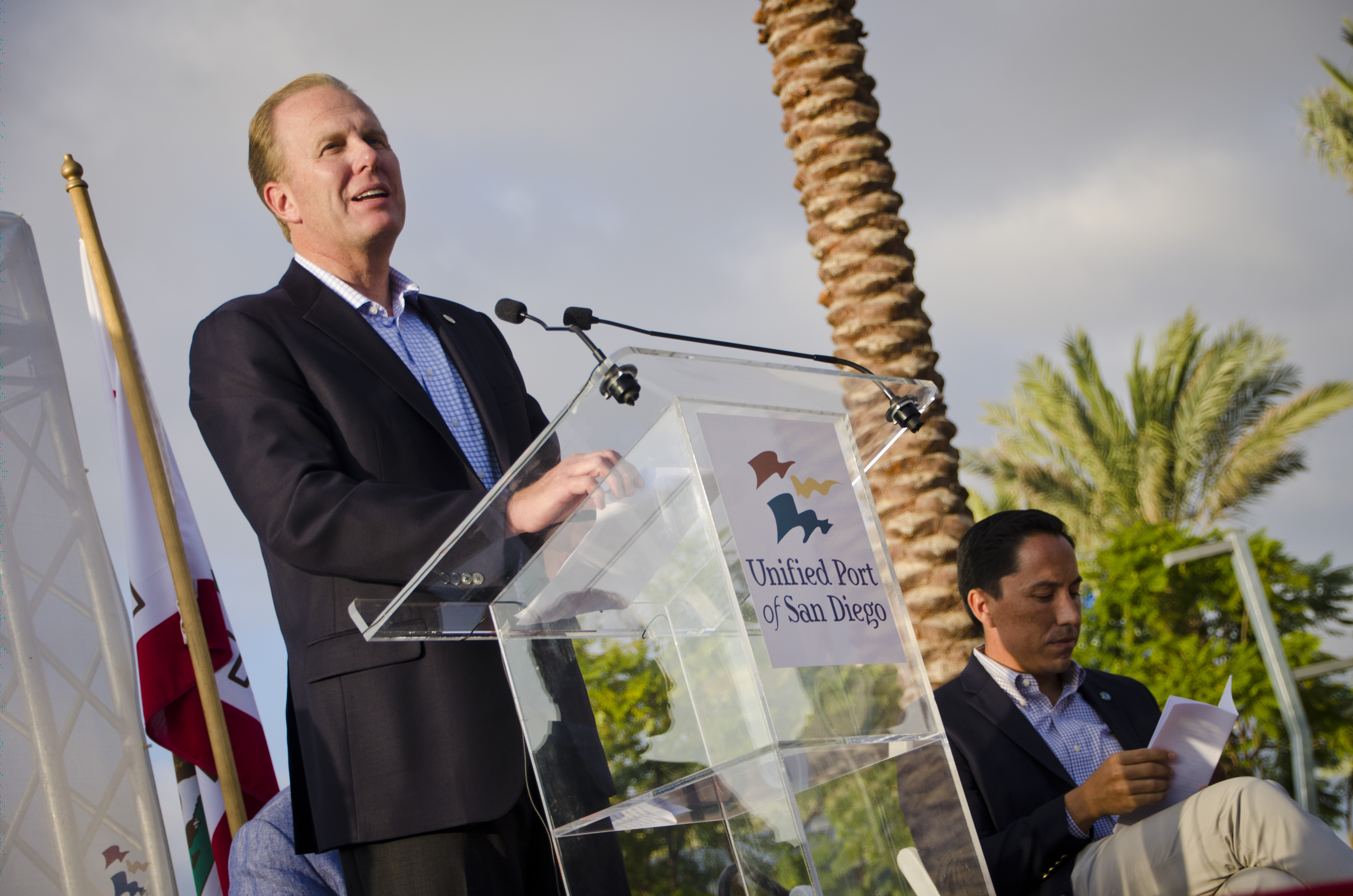
Faulconer in November 2014

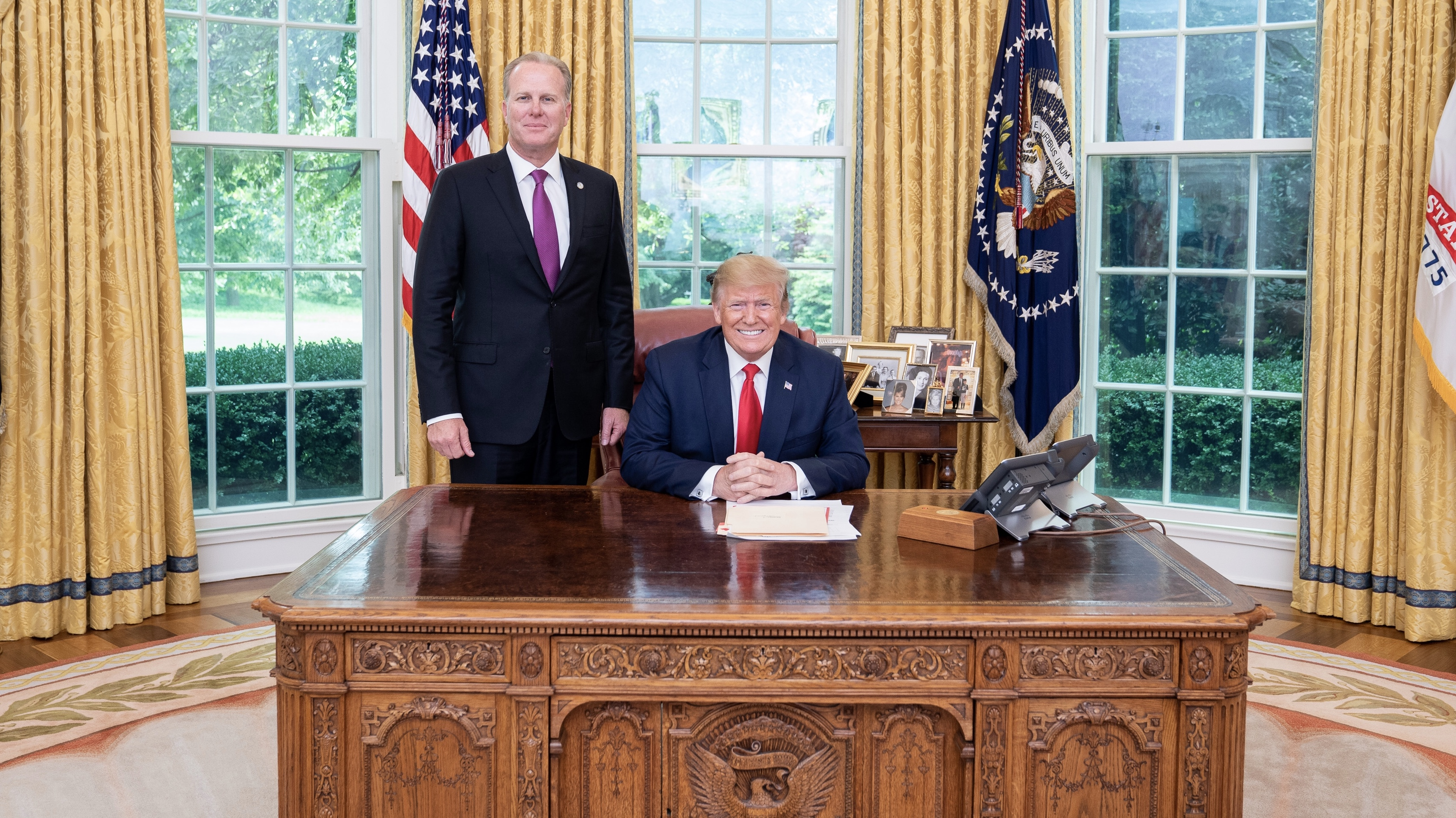
Faulconer with U.S. president Donald Trump in the Oval Office, June 2019

In September 2013 Faulconer entered the special mayoral election that resulted from the resignation of Mayor Bob Filner. He was endorsed by the local Republican Party and by former mayor Jerry Sanders, now president of the San Diego Chamber of Commerce. He campaigned both in English and Spanish.

In the election held November 19, 2013 Faulconer received 43.6 percent of the vote and advanced to a runoff election against fellow city councilmember David Alvarez (who had received 25.6 percent of the vote) on February 11, 2014. In the runoff, Faulconer was endorsed by former San Diego City Attorney Mike Aguirre, a Democratic mayoral candidate who had placed fourth in the first round of the election. Faulconer was elected mayor with 54.5 percent of the vote in the runoff. He was sworn in on March 3, 2014.

In 2015, Faulconer declared his intention to run for a full term in 2016. His opponents in the election were former state assemblywoman Lori Saldaña and former San Diego City Council member Ed Harris. Faulconer won re-election in the June 7, 2016 primary by garnering 58.2 percent of the vote.

Faulconer endorsed Marco Rubio in the 2016 Republican Party presidential primaries. After the primary, Faulconer stated he would not vote for then-candidate Donald Trump in 2016. After the 2020 election, he stated that he had voted for Trump in that year's election.

Faulconer had been urged by state Republican leaders to run for governor in 2018, and polls showed him as the leading Republican candidate. Faulconer consistently said he would not run, and in June 2017 confirmed it, saying his top priority was finishing out his term as mayor.

=== Climate action plan ===
In 2014, Faulconer released San Diego's first Climate Action Plan. The plan outlined Faulconer's proposed strategy for the city to meet State goals for the city to reduce greenhouse gas emissions. In 2018, Faulconer proposed pursuing a city-run Community Choice Aggregation (CCA) program to meet the plan's goal of purchasing 100 percent renewable energy by 2035. By September 2019, Faulconer had convinced four other nearby cities (Encinitas, La Mesa, Imperial Beach and Chula Vista) to join San Diego's CCA through a joint powers authority.

=== Minimum wage ===
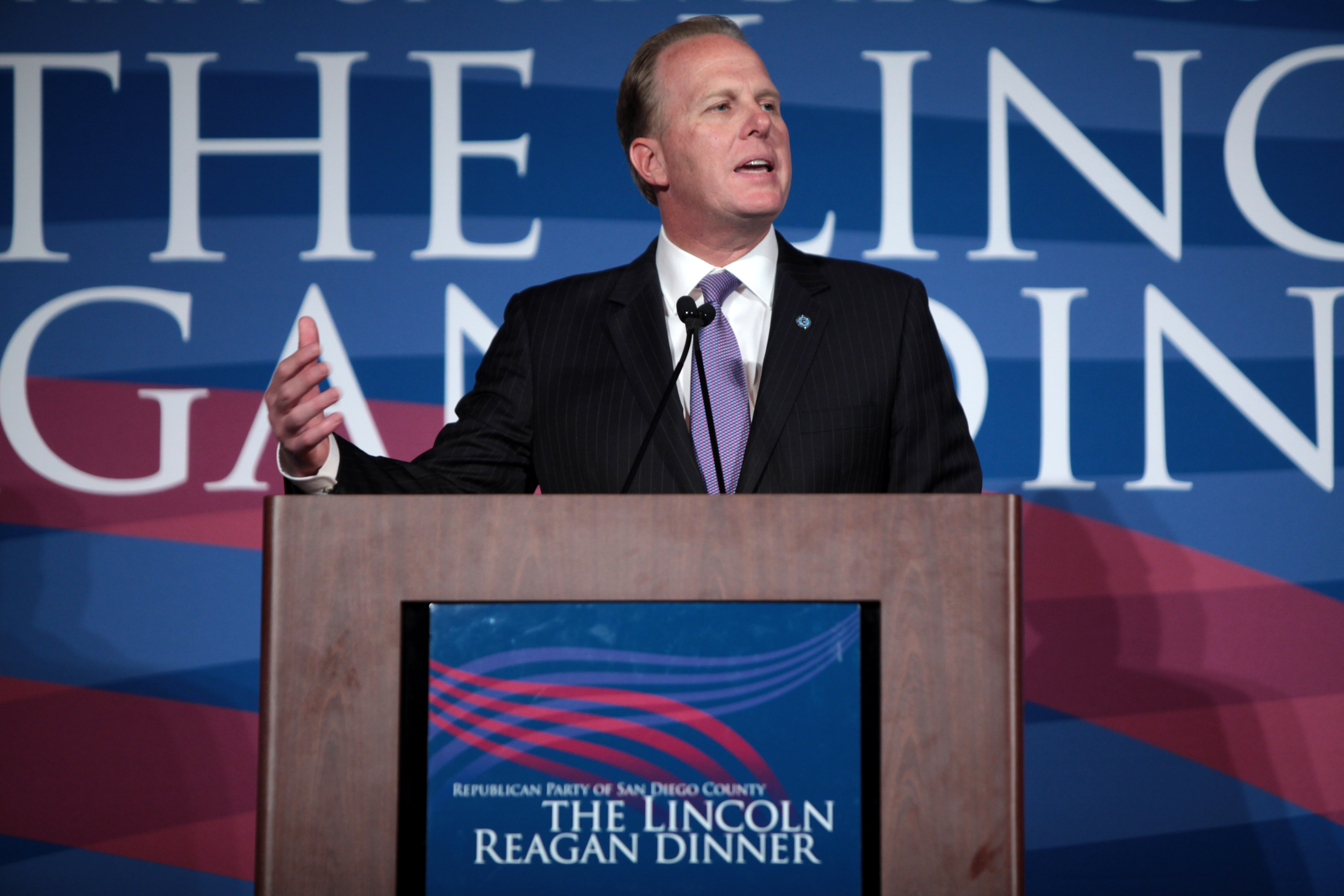
Faulconer speaking at the 2015 Lincoln–Reagan Dinner hosted in San Diego, California.

In August 2014, Faulconer vetoed a measure passed by the City Council which would incrementally increase the minimum wage in San Diego to $11.50 per hour from the $9.00 statewide minimum. The Council overrode his veto by a vote of 6 to 2. However, implementation of the measure was delayed by a successful signature drive led by business groups, forcing a public referendum before the measure could go into effect. On June 7, 2016, the ballot measure passed with a 63.8 percent majority vote, allowing the measure to go into effect.

=== San Diego Chargers ===
A major issue during his first term was a bid by the San Diego Chargers to move to the Los Angeles area. Faulconer campaigned to keep the Chargers in San Diego and proposed that the city build a new stadium, financed in part by the city and county governments. Faulconer later endorsed a ballot measure sponsored by the Chargers that would raise the hotel tax to pay for a stadium. The ballot measure failed with only 43 percent of the vote in favor. In January 2017, the Chargers announced that they would be relocating from San Diego to Los Angeles.

=== Convention center expansion ===
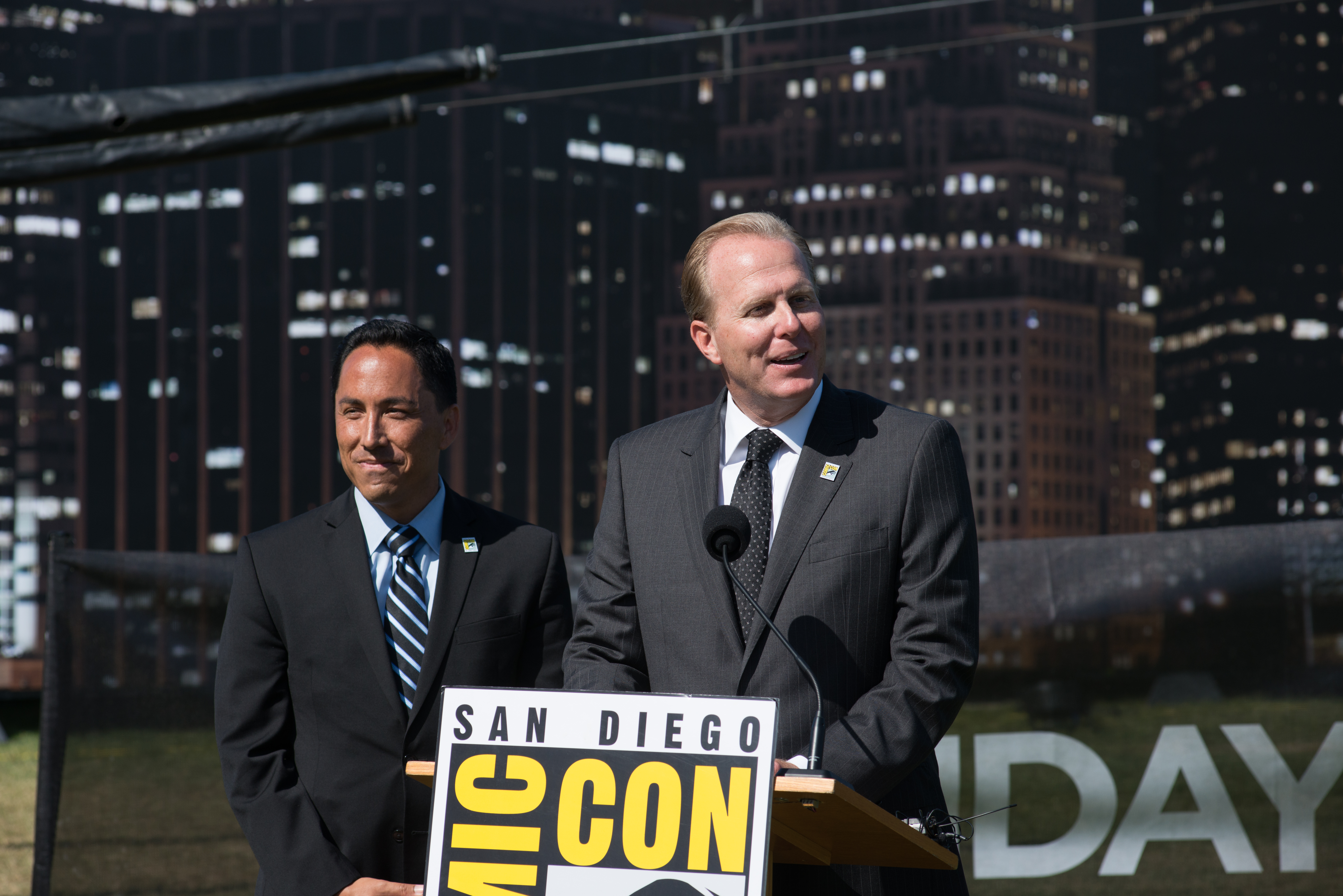
Faulconer and Todd Gloria at San Diego Comic-Con in July 2014.

In 2017, Faulconer put forth a measure that would fund the expansion of the San Diego Convention Center by increasing the hotel tax, but the City Council declined to call for a special election. In 2018, Faulconer supported a citizen's initiative that would accomplish the same thing as his original measure. The measure qualified, but too late to be included on the 2018 ballot. In April 2019, the City Council approved a proposal by Faulconer to move the election from the November 2020 general election to the March 2020 primary election by a vote of 5–4. The ballot measure, titled Measure C, got 65% of the vote in the March election, just short of the two-thirds majority needed to pass per the language of the measure. However, the City Council amended the language certifying the election to not say it needed a two-thirds majority. This allowed litigation to continue which could potentially lower the threshold to pass from two-thirds to a simple majority.

=== Housing and homelessness ===
Faulconer has been an outspoken opponent of the "Not In My Back Yard" mentality (also known as NIMBYism). He has called for scrapping restrictions on housing development, such as building-height limits near public transit and parking requirements, as well as various restrictions on dense housing (including affordable housing). He has called for streamlining of the approvals process. Faulconer said these reforms were needed to combat San Diego's housing crisis, reduce homelessness and improve the environment.

In both his 2018 and 2019 State of the City addresses, Faulconer vowed to reduce the growing number of people who are street homeless in San Diego. Faulconer's efforts included a 40 percent increase in funding from 2018 to 2019, the opening of shelter tents, the creation of safe parking spots, a storage center for the homeless, and successful advocacy for more funding from the State.

Just a month before the end of his term as mayor, Faulconer put a package of affordable housing proposals before the San Diego City Council called Complete Communities. The package incentivizes building to reduce homelessness while banning the use of said buildings for short-term rentals like Airbnb. It also creates an "ongoing funding stream" for public transportation via fees on more suburban developers, and prioritizes improvements in parks in low-income areas. The City Council approved Faulconer's Complete Communities plan on November 9, 2020.

=== Hepatitis A outbreak ===
Beginning in November 2016, San Diego had one of the nation's largest Hepatitis A epidemics. From 2016 to 2018, Hepatitis A caused at least twenty deaths in San Diego County, with 589 reported cases of infection. Of those cases, 291 (49%) were in people experiencing homelessness (PEH). On October 24, 2018, the Center for Disease Control's Advisory Committee on Immunization Practices (ACIP) recommended that all persons aged 1 year and older experiencing homelessness be routinely immunized against HAV.

One rationale for this recommendation was the observation that "Persons experiencing homelessness might have difficulty implementing recommended nonvaccine strategies to protect themselves from exposure (e.g., access to clean toilet facilities...). An October 2017 news article on the San Diego epidemic noted that, in the summer of 2016, as part of preparations for the MLB All-Star Game, "the city was locking and removing bathrooms," contributing to what one infectious disease researcher described as "the perfect storm."

Faulconer and his staff learned of the Hepatitis A outbreak in June 2017 and proposed plans to combat it, including installing hand washing stations near homeless encampments. However, San Diego County Public Health officials experienced delays and attributed these to "an inability to swiftly coordinate with city officials." In an interview about the causes of San Diego's rapidly escalating Hepatitis A epidemic and the high rates of death, it was noted that "When those emergency tents [for PEH] were permanently closed, we began to see a dramatic increase in the number of people living on the streets." Faulconer did not deny this as a cause, but responded, "We are not looking back."

=== COVID-19 pandemic response ===
Faulconer was mayor during the COVID-19 pandemic in California. To enforce social distancing, Faulconer issued an executive order on March 16 closing all bars and nightclubs and only allowing takeout from restaurants. This was followed on March 23 with an order closing all city-owned beaches, parks, and trails. Faulconer also announced that the San Diego Convention Center would be opened as a shelter to protect the homeless from the pandemic, and that 240 new shelter beds would be added to Golden Hall. In response to an estimated $250 million reduction in revenue associated with the outbreak, Faulconer proposed major budget cuts, including the elimination of 354 jobs. On April 29, 2020, Faulconer announced San Diego would close certain streets in San Diego to encourage safe cycling and walking while maintaining social distancing. Faulconer also responded to Governor Gavin Newsom's statewide beach closure, stating that it is "sending the wrong message" as Faulconer allowed beaches in San Diego to reopen on April 24, 2020.

=== Social issues ===
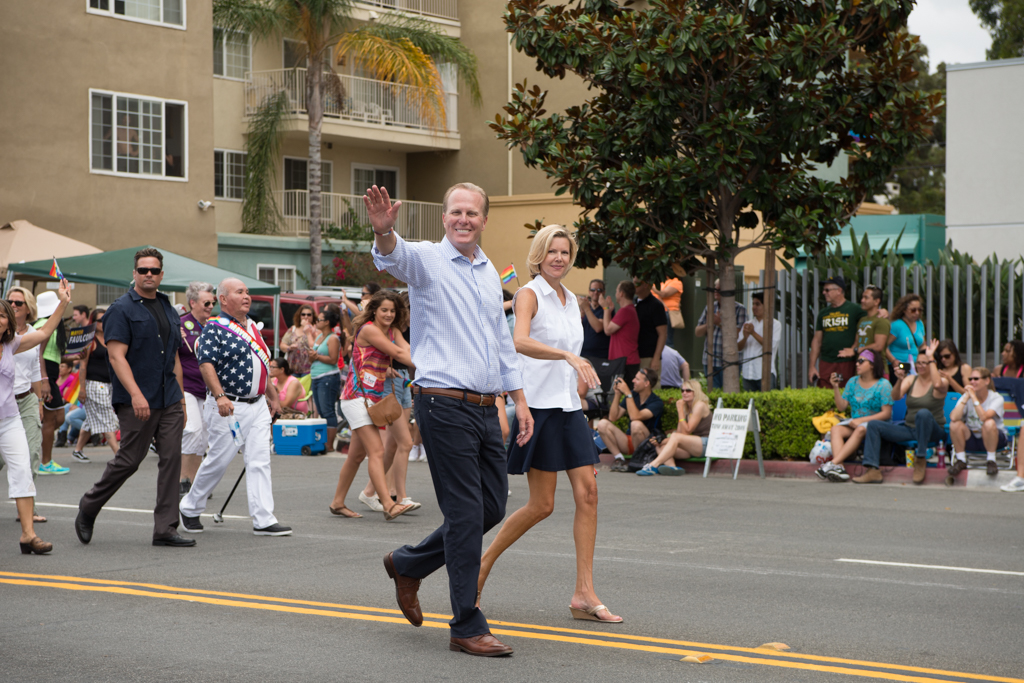
Faulconer marching in the 2014 San Diego LGBTQ Pride Parade.

Though a fiscally conservative Republican, Faulconer holds many socially liberal positions. Faulconer supports a path to citizenship for illegal immigrants who live in the United States. He also supports same-sex marriage and had campaigned against passage of Proposition 8. In 2014, he participated in and supported LGBTQ Pride Month. In 2019, the mayor met with San Diego community leaders to voice support and encourage members of the U.S. Congress to vote for the Equality Act, a bill that would extend the Civil Rights Act to protect against discrimination based on sexual orientation or gender identity. As a part of his previously mentioned effort to address homelessness, Faulconer announced he was working with local faith leaders to provide shelter to LGBTQ homeless youth. Following the murder of George Floyd in June 2020, Faulconer pushed for a ban on the use of chokeholds by the San Diego Police Department.

Faulconer has described himself as pro-choice on the issue of abortion. Responding to protests against anti-abortion legislation, Faulconer made a statement saying that he would not restrict abortion rights in San Diego and would oppose movements to restrict abortion in California. He supports use of capital punishment.

=== 101 Ash Street ===
In 2016, Faulconer entered into a lease-to-own agreement for San Diego's new City Hall at 101 Ash St. The building is uninhabitable with asbestos and other issues. 101 Ash has become synonymous in San Diego with political scandals and bad real estate deals. The city overpaid for the property by $30M. It then botched renovations and eventually discovered its own real estate broker had also been working for the building's seller.

On July 23, 2021, a San Diego Union-Tribune audit report revealed, "a serious lack of policies and oversight caused the City to miss or skip key steps in the acquisition process” and that Faulconer's administration left out or misrepresented key information." The audit revealed Faulconer stated the property only needed $10,000 in repairs, but ultimately needed $115 million in repairs and improvements. Faulconer's administration relied upon a dual agent who represented both the seller and the buyer (the city of San Diego) in the transaction.

== Statewide political career ==
Shortly after leaving office as mayor, Faulconer announced his support for the recall campaign seeking to remove incumbent governor Gavin Newsom from office through a referendum, tweeting: “It’s a new year. We need a new governor. Jobs are leaving, homelessness is skyrocketing, and the state can’t even issue unemployment checks to people struggling right now to get by. California is better than this. Join me in signing the recall petition". Faulconer strongly criticized Newsom following the scandal at The French Laundry, an expensive, five-star restaurant in Yountville which the governor had attended for a birthday party in November 2020, in violation of state gathering rules that he himself had enacted.

=== California gubernatorial campaign ===
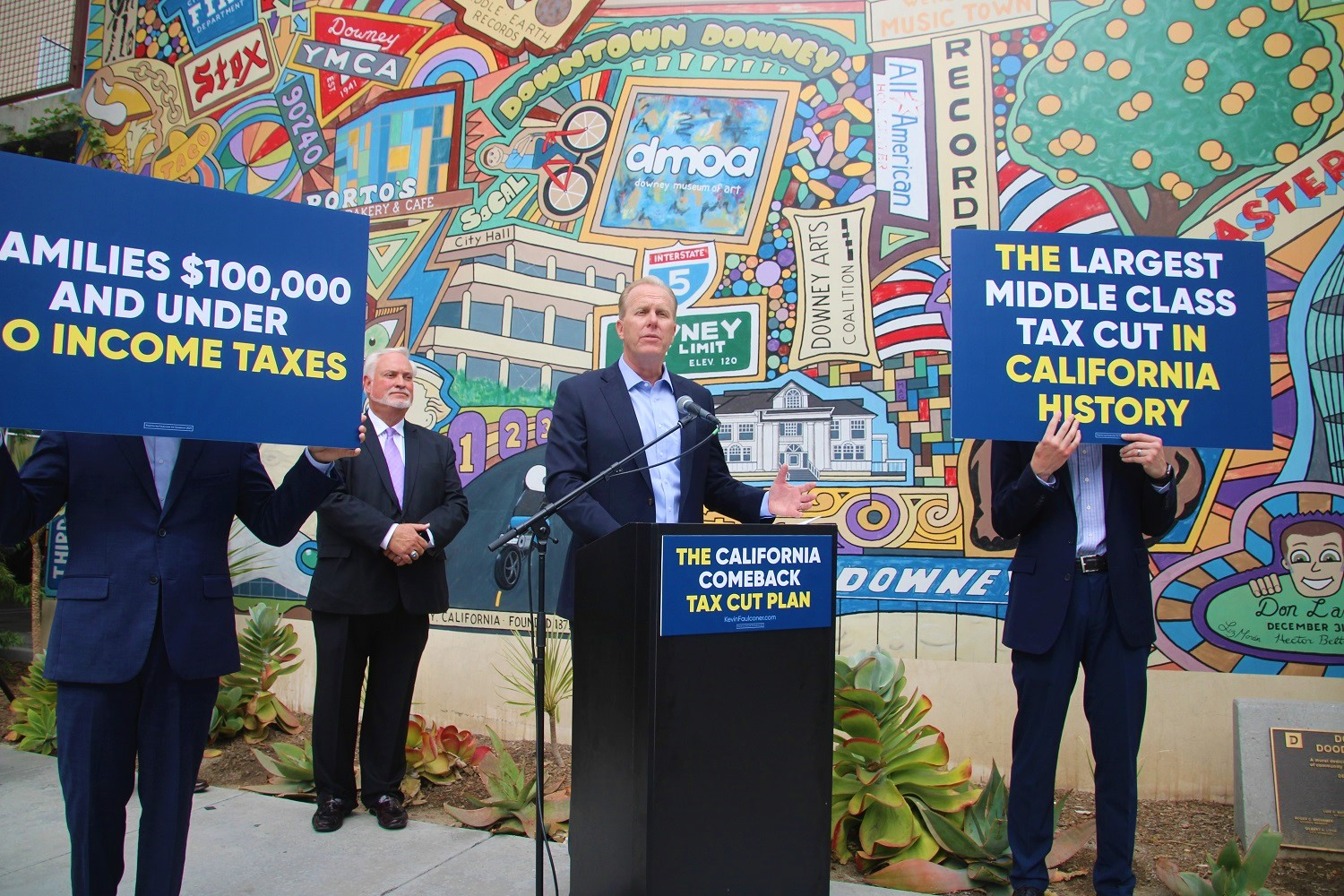
Faulconer campaigning for governor in Downey, California

During the course of 2020, Faulconer was seen as a potential Republican candidate for governor of California in the 2022 gubernatorial election. Faulconer was described as a "top contender" and The San Diego Union-Tribune said that the "state may be ready to pick a Republican" in the race for governor, considering that he needs a minimum to reach second place in the nonpartisan blanket primary to advance to the general election. The Mercury News noted that his campaign could make the most competitive gubernatorial pick for a Republican since Meg Whitman in 2010. Faulconer was compared to fellow moderate Republicans Larry Hogan of Maryland and Charlie Baker of Massachusetts, who hold such positions in deeply Democratic states like California. Speculation increased in November 2020, when Faulconer confirmed that he was "seriously considering" running for governor in the upcoming 2022 election.

On January 4, 2021, Faulconer launched an exploratory committee to run for governor of California. Faulconer has indicated that he could be part of the recall election's list of replacement candidates if it proved to be successful. San Francisco Gate argued that Faulconer probably has the best chance of being elected in a recall election.

On February 1, 2021, Faulconer officially announced that he was running for governor of California in either 2022 or a recall election and stated that, "I'm going to be a voice for Californians who are suffering because California can't do the basics". Faulconer reiterated his support for the campaign for a recall election against Governor Newsom, which by that point had reached 1.3 million signatures out of the 1.5 million required to reach the ballot.

The Los Angeles Times Editorial Board declared that Faulconer would be the least offensive of the replacement candidates to Gavin Newsom, and endorsed him for the replacement question. Faulconer placed third out of the 46 replacement candidates on the ballot, behind fellow Republican Larry Elder and Democrat Kevin Paffrath, though the recall vote failed with 61% voting no.

=== San Diego County Board of Supervisors campaign ===
In 2024, Faulconer challenged Supervisor Terra Lawson-Remer for her seat in coastal District 3 in his first attempt at office since his bid for governor during the failed recall campaign against Governor Gavin Newsom in 2021. In the general election, he lost to Lawson-Remer by around a 13% margin.

== Personal life ==
Faulconer met his future wife, Katherine Stuart, in 1997. They were married in 1999. Faulconer and Stuart have two children. She is the founder and president of Restaurant Events, a company that plans block parties and other events, and has been described as the primary breadwinner in the family. He is a member of Point Loma Community Presbyterian Church, a congregation of the Presbyterian Church, and has described his faith as important to his values.

The couple separated in September 2023, and in November the couple issued a joint statement, saying "We have decided to go our separate ways after many years together and raising two amazing children."

== Electoral history ==
=== San Diego City Council ===
2002 San Diego City Council district 2 election
Candidate	First-round		Runoff	
Candidate	Votes	%	Votes	%
Michael Zucchet	9,705	34.1	22,610	55.6
Kevin Faulconer	9,063	31.9	18,050	44.3
Wayne Raffesberger	4,279	15.0		
Jim Bell	2,829	9.9		
Chuck Bahde	1,045	3.6		
Jim Morrison	841	2.9		
Woody Guthrie Deck	648	2.2		
Total	31,929	100	40,660	100

2005–2006 San Diego City Council district 2 special election
Candidate	First-round		Runoff	
Candidate	Votes	%	Votes	%
Kevin Faulconer	15,912	34.44	15,044	51.23
Lorena Gonzalez	11,543	24.98	14,320	48.77
Carolyn Chase	4,090	8.85		
Rich Grosch	2,906	6.29		
Tim Rutherford	2,442	5.29		
Kathleen Blavatt	1,848	4.00		
Ian Trowbridge	1,746	3.78		
Pat Zaharopoulos	1,273	2.76		
Phil Meinhardt	1,054	2.28		
Tom Eaton	754	1.63		
Greg Finley	615	1.33		
David Diehl	470	1.02		
James Joaquin Morrison	441	0.95		
George Najjar	280	0.61		
Robert E. Lee	250	0.54		
Allen Hujsak	242	0.52		
Linda Susan Finley	202	0.44		
Total	52,154	100	29,448	100

2006 San Diego City Council district 2 election
Candidate	Votes	%
Kevin Faulconer (incumbent)	18,097	71.81
Kennan Kaeder	6,920	27.46
Total votes	25,202	100

2010 San Diego City Council district 2 election
Candidate	Votes	%
Kevin Faulconer (incumbent)	17,089	61.52
Patrick Finucane	6,828	24.58
Jim Morrison	3,796	13.67
Total votes	27,777	100

=== Mayor of San Diego ===
2013–14 San Diego mayoral special election
Candidate	First-round		Runoff	
Candidate	Votes	%	Votes	%
Kevin Faulconer	101,953	42.08	153,491	52.89
David Alvarez	65,740	27.13	136,701	47.11
Nathan Fletcher	58,355	24.09		
Mike Aguirre	10,783	4.45		
Lincoln Pickard	1,144	0.47		
Bruce Coons	1,012	0.42		
S. "Simon" Moghadam	748	0.31		
Hud Collins	647	0.27		
Michael A. Kemmer	612	0.25		
Harry Dirks	434	0.18		
Tobiah L. Pettus	344	0.14		
Total	242,282	100	290,192	100

2016 San Diego mayoral election
Candidate	Votes	%
Kevin Faulconer (incumbent)	181,147	57.16
Lori Saldaña	73,932	23.33
Ed Harris	61,458	19.39
Total votes	316,891	100

=== Governor of California ===
2021 California gubernatorial recall election
Vote on recall			Votes	Percentage
No			7,944,092	61.88
Yes			4,894,473	38.12
Invalid or blank votes			54,013	4.19
Totals			12,892,578	100
Voter turnout			58.45%	
Rank	Party	Candidate	Votes	Percentage
1	Republican	Larry Elder	3,563,867	48.4
2	Democratic	Kevin Paffrath	706,778	9.6
3	Republican	Kevin Faulconer	590,346	8.0
4	Democratic	Brandon M. Ross	392,029	5.3
All other candidates			2,108,548	28.64
Total valid votes			7,361,568	100
Invalid or blank votes			5,531,010	42.90
Totals			12,892,578	100
Voter turnout			58.45%	

=== San Diego County Board of Supervisors ===
2024 Board of Supervisors District 3 election
Candidate	Votes	%
Terra Lawson-Remer (incumbent)	178,781	57.0
Kevin Faulconer	134,991	43.0
Total votes	313,772	100

Political offices
Preceded by Michael Zucchet	Member of the San Diego City Council from the 2nd district 2006–2014	Succeeded by Ed Harris
Preceded by Todd Gloria; Acting	Mayor of San Diego; 2014–2020	Succeeded by Todd Gloria
