= Michael Zucchet =

American politician (born 1969)

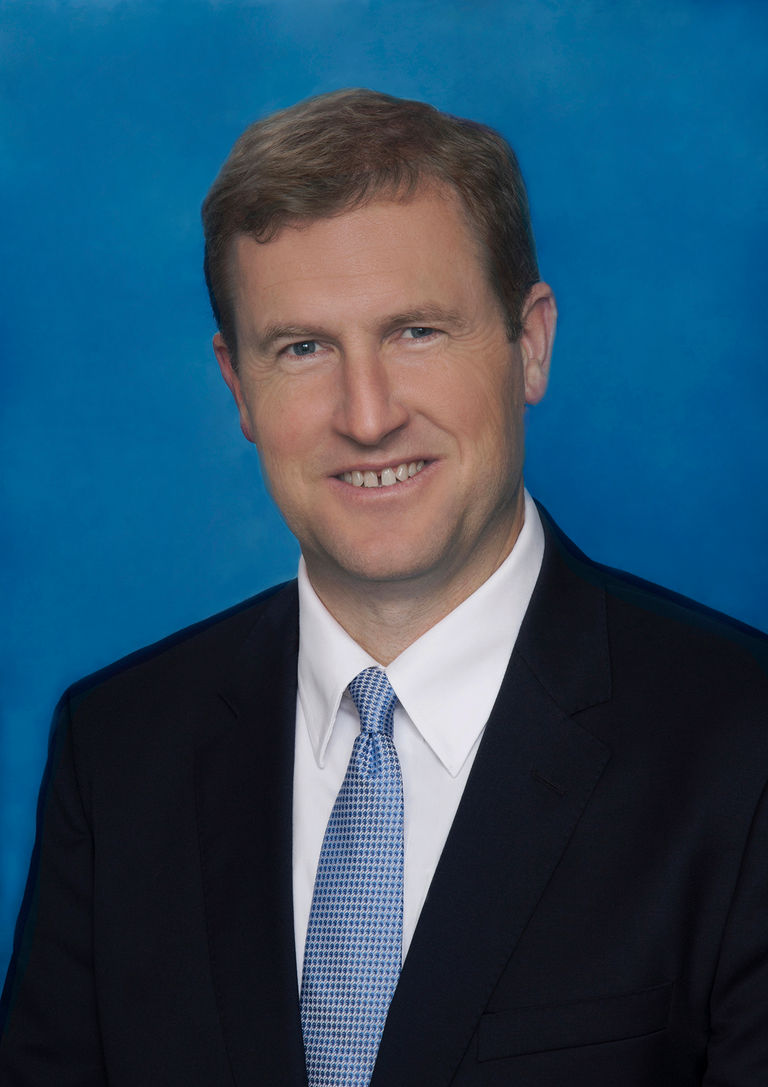
- Official portrait, 2017

Acting Mayor of San Diego
- In office July 15, 2005 – July 18, 2005
- Preceded by: Dick Murphy
- Succeeded by: Toni Atkins (acting)

Member of San Diego City Council representing the Second District
- In office December 2002 – July 18, 2005
- Preceded by: Byron Wear
- Succeeded by: Kevin Faulconer

Personal details
- Born: December 24, 1969 (age 56) San Diego, California, U.S.
- Party: Democratic
- Spouse: Teresa
- Children: 2
- Education: University of California, Santa Barbara; Duke University

Michael J. Zucchet (born December 24, 1969) is an American Democratic politician, a former member of the San Diego City Council, and a former deputy mayor of San Diego. In 2005, he briefly served as the acting mayor of San Diego.

== Early life and career ==
Zucchet earned a bachelor's degree in Business Economics and Environmental Studies from the University of California, Santa Barbara, and a master's degree in Environmental Economics and Policy from Duke University.

He worked as a renewable energy economist with the Energy Information Administration of the United States Department of Energy in Washington, DC, then returned to San Diego in 1996 to work as a City Council aide to councilmember Valerie Stallings. From 1998 through 2002, he served as the legislative and community affairs director for the San Diego City Fire Fighters.

Zucchet has also done work with the non-profit Environmental Defense Center in Santa Barbara while in college. He has served as president of the San Diego League of Conservation Voters, vice-president of the Pacific Beach Town Council, been elected member of the Pacific Beach Community Planning Committee, and appointed member of the city's Select Committee on Government Efficiency and Fiscal Reform. He is a graduate of LEAD San Diego.

== San Diego City Council ==
Michael Zucchet served as a San Diego city councilmember representing the city's Second District. He won the seat by defeating challenger Kevin Faulconer in the 2002 election. In December 2004, Zucchet became Deputy Mayor. As Deputy Mayor, Zucchet became acting mayor after Dick Murphy resigned July 15, 2005.

=== Corruption allegations ===
Three days after becoming acting Mayor, Zucchet resigned from the City Council after he was convicted in U.S. District Court of one count of conspiracy, five counts of wire fraud and three counts of extortion. This was in connection with an alleged scheme also involving fellow City Council members Ralph Inzunza and Charles L. Lewis to get the city's "no touch" laws at strip clubs repealed.

On November 10, 2005, citing lack of evidence, a judge overturned the convictions against Zucchet. He acquitted Zucchet on seven of the original nine charges and ordered a new trial on the remaining two indictments. The convictions against two co-defendants were upheld.

On September 1, 2009, the Ninth U.S. Circuit Court of Appeals upheld Zucchet's acquittals. In the decision, the Court emphasized the lack of evidence against Zucchet. The remaining two charges against him were finally dropped in 2010.

== Post-City Council career ==
After leaving the city council, Zucchet worked at the Utility Consumers' Action Network (UCAN) as a project manager starting in 2006. In 2009 he became the general manager of the San Diego Municipal Employees Association, the union that represents city workers. In 2017 he was appointed to serve as one of San Diego's three representatives on the San Diego Port Commission, which governs the Port of San Diego.

== Personal life ==
Zucchet lives in the Ocean Beach area of San Diego with his wife Teresa and his two children.

On July 2, 2013, Zucchet (an avid bridge and card player at Duke University), finished in 4th place for $143,642 in Event #54, $1,000 No-Limit Hold'em, at the World Series of Poker.

Political offices
Preceded by Dick Murphy	Mayor of San Diego, California (acting); 2005	Succeeded by Toni Atkins (acting)
