= Woody Deck =

American poker player (born 1983)

- Woody Deck at the Barcelona HPC
- Nicknames: plplaya, labaslietuva, Shooter McGavin

World Series of Poker
- Bracelet: None
- Money finish: 1
- Highest WSOP Main Event finish: None

European Poker Tour
- Title: None
- Final table: None
- Money finish: 1

Woody Deck (born June 8, 1983, in Nashville, TN) is an American professional poker player residing in Vilnius, Lithuania.

A cash game specialist who seldom enters tournaments, Deck holds the best record in Pot Limit Omaha Hi/Lo tournaments with a current streak of 3 consecutive final tables (1 win), and owns the record for consecutive heads-up tournaments matches won, 13.

During his streak of heads-up matches, he won back to back heads-up titles at the 2005 Barcelona Heads-up Poker Circuit (HPC), and the 2005 Slovenia HPC before losing in the 3rd round of the 2006 World Heads-Up Poker Championship.

By way of his European ranking, Deck qualified for the Professional Poker Tour (PPT) for the 2006-2007 season.

As of 2008, his total live tournament winnings exceed $330,000.
