= Ben Hueso =

American politician (born 1969)

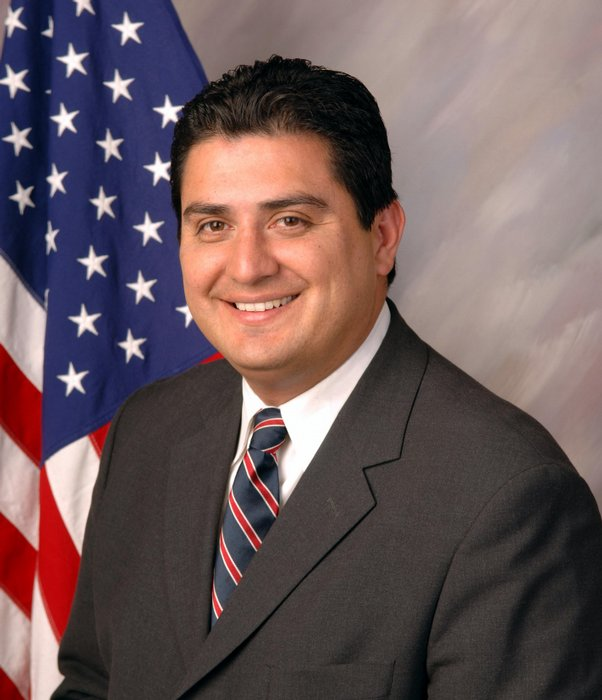

Member of the California State Senate from the 40th district
- In office March 21, 2013 – December 5, 2022
- Preceded by: Juan Vargas
- Succeeded by: Steve Padilla

Member of the California State Assembly
- In office December 6, 2010 – March 21, 2013
- Preceded by: Mary Salas
- Succeeded by: Lorena Gonzalez
- Constituency: 79th district (2010–2012); 80th district (2012–2013)

Member of San Diego City Council representing the 8th District
- In office December 5, 2005 – December 6, 2010
- Preceded by: Ralph Inzunza
- Succeeded by: David Alvarez

Personal details
- Born: September 2, 1969 (age 57) San Diego, California, U.S.
- Party: Democratic
- Spouse: Laura Campa
- Children: 4
- Education: University of California, Los Angeles (BA); San Diego State University
- Occupation: Small businessman

Benjamin Hueso (born September 2, 1969) is an American businessman and politician who served as a member of the California State Senate from 2013 to 2022, representing the 40th Senate District. A member of the Democratic Party, he previously served in the California State Assembly and on the San Diego City Council.

Hueso served as Chair of the California Latino Legislative Caucus. He previously served as vice-chair from 2015 to 2016.

Hueso was elected to the State Senate in a 2013 special election to replace then-Senator Juan Vargas, who was elected to the U.S. House of Representatives in November 2012. Before being elected to the State Senate, he served in the California State Assembly, representing the 80th Assembly district from 2012 to 2013 and the 79th Assembly District from 2010 to 2012. Prior to that, he served on the San Diego City Council, including two years as Council President.

== Education and career ==
Hueso was born in San Diego and grew up in Logan Heights. His parents were immigrants from Mexico and community activists, running an informal community medical clinic out of their home. He graduated from Point Loma High School and then from the University of California, Los Angeles with a degree in Sociology/Urban Studies and Planning. He studied at the University of Odesa, Ukraine and completed post-graduate work in Community and Economic Development at San Diego State University. He worked for the city as a redevelopment agency staffer and also owned his own business.

== Elective office ==
=== San Diego City Council ===
Hueso was elected in a special 2005 election and reelected in the regular 2006 election to represent San Diego City Council District 8. He was the only Latino on the council at the time. He was chosen by his colleagues to serve as City Council President 2009–2010, the second person to serve in that post. He was also a member of the California Coastal Commission for two years while serving on the City Council.

=== California State Assembly ===
He was elected in November 2010 to represent the 79th District in the California State Assembly of the California State Legislature. In 2012 he was elected to the 80th district due to redistricting.

=== California State Senate ===
In January 2013 he declared his candidacy for the State Senate 40th district, which became vacant when State Senator Juan Vargas was elected to Congress. He won the election on March 12, 2013, avoiding a runoff by garnering 52.3% of the vote against three other candidates. He took office on March 21, 2013.

=== San Diego County Board of Supervisors ===
On August 18, 2019, Hueso announced that he would be a candidate for the San Diego County Board of Supervisors. He ran to succeed incumbent Greg Cox, a popular Republican who was term-limited. In the March 3, 2020 primary, Hueso finished in first place with 29.3% of the vote and faced Southwestern Community College Board Trustee Nora Vargas, who finished second place with 18.9%, in the November runoff. In a mild upset, Vargas won the runoff.

=== California State Board of Equalization ===
As of 2021, Hueso had opened a campaign account to run for the California State Board of Equalization in 2022.

== Personal ==
Hueso is a lifelong resident of Logan Heights in San Diego's District 8. He has four sons.

At 2:49 a.m. on Aug 22, 2014, Sen. Hueso was arrested in downtown Sacramento on suspicion of DUI.
