= Tony Young (politician) =

American politician (born 1966)

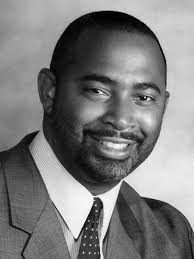

Member of San Diego City Council from the 4th district
- In office January 4, 2005 – January 1, 2013
- Preceded by: Charles L. Lewis III
- Succeeded by: Myrtle Cole

President of the San Diego City Council
- In office December 6, 2010 – December 3, 2012
- Preceded by: Ben Hueso
- Succeeded by: Todd Gloria

Personal details
- Born: 1966 (age 59–60)
- Party: Democratic
- Children: 3
- Education: Howard University

Tony Young (born 1966) is an American politician. He was the president of the city council of San Diego, California, and served as a member of the council from 2005 to 2013, representing District 4. He is a Democrat, although the position is officially nonpartisan per California state law.

San Diego's fourth council district includes the following communities: Alta Vista, Broadway Heights, Chollas View, Emerald Hills, Jamacha, Lincoln Park, Lomita Village, Mt. Hope, Mt. View, North Bay Terrace, North Encanto, Oak Park, O'Farrell, Paradise Hills, Ridgeview, South Encanto, Skyline Hills, South Bay Terrace, Valencia Park, and Webster.

== Career ==
Young is a graduate of Howard University.

=== San Diego City Council ===
He was elected to represent San Diego's fourth council district on January 4, 2005, in a special election held after the unexpected death of the incumbent council member, Charles L. Lewis III, in August 2004. Young had been Lewis's chief of staff. Young was easily reelected in the 2006 election and the 2010 election.

In December 2010 Young was unanimously elected by the other council members to serve as San Diego City Council President. He immediately promised changes in how the City Council operates, including more openness to the public and a primary focus on the city's budget problems, saying "Don't be surprised if you see that (the budget deficit) on the agenda every week until that's corrected." He also chaired City Council's Rules Committee, Open Government and Intergovernmental Relations Committee.

In November 2012 he announced his intention to resign from the City Council to become CEO of the San Diego-Imperial Counties chapter of the American Red Cross. His resignation took effect January 1, 2013 and triggered a special election in March for the balance of his term, which ends in 2014.

He headed the local Red Cross chapter from January 2013 until March 2014. In March 2014 the national American Red Cross organization informed the local board that Young was no longer head of the chapter. No official reason was given; Young said there had been a "difference of opinion."

== Personal life ==
He lives in Valencia Park with his wife Jacqueline and three daughters.
