= Chollas View, San Diego =

Neighborhood in San Diego, California

- Community of San Diego
- Chollas View
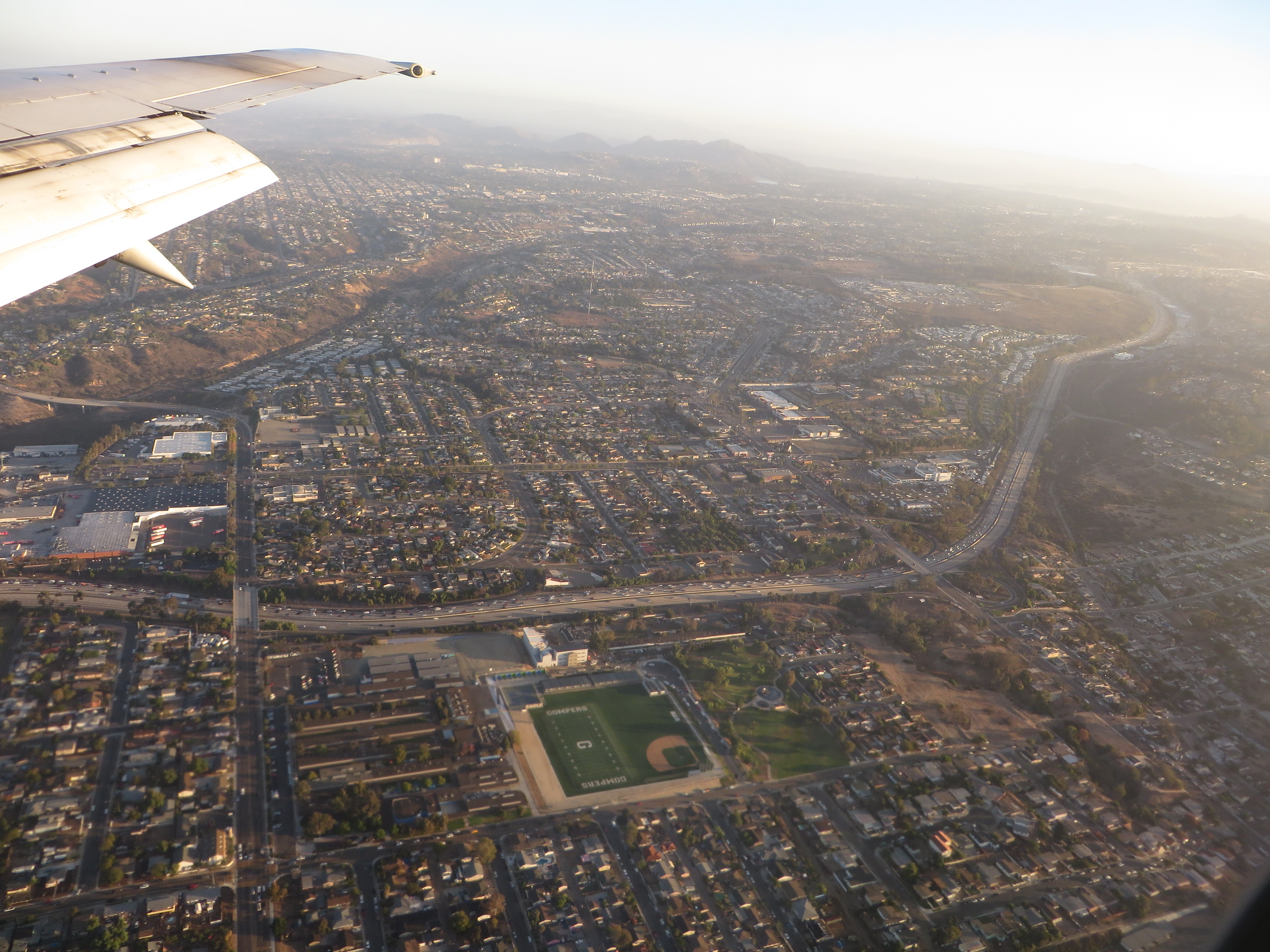
- 2014 aerial photo of Chollas View

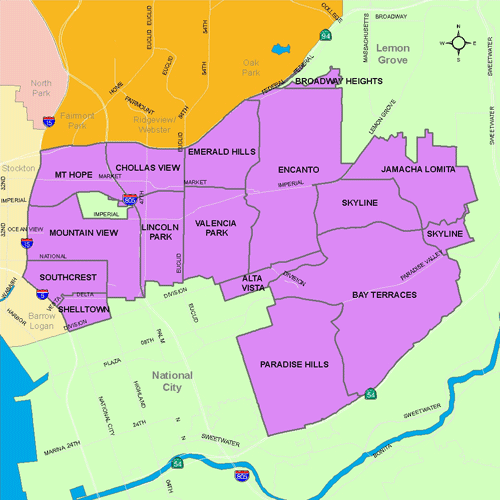
- Chollas View is located in the southeastern area of the city of San Diego

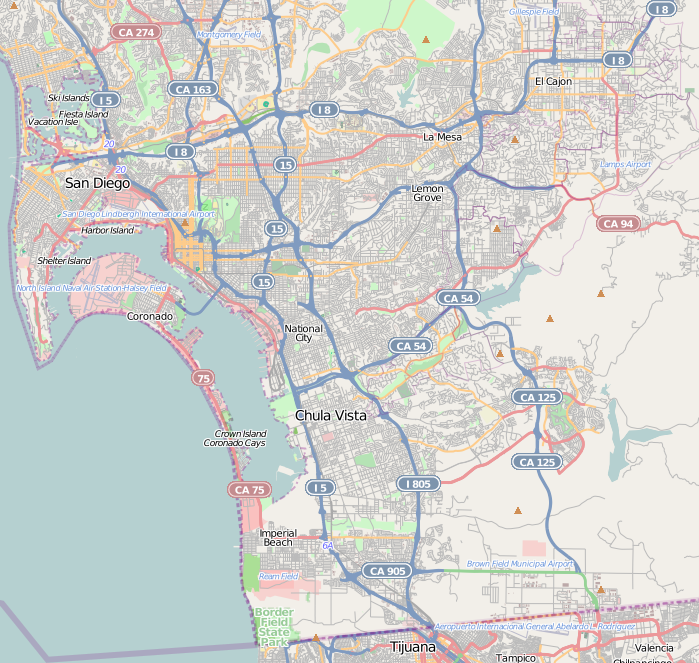
- Location within San Diego
- Coordinates: 32.7121°N 117.0941°W
- Country: United States of America
- State: California
- County: San Diego
- City: San Diego
- ZIP Code: 92102

Chollas View is an urban community in the southeastern section of San Diego, California. It borders Webster and California State Route 94 on the north, Mount Hope and Interstate 805 on the west, Emerald Hills and Euclid Avenue on the east, and Lincoln Park and the San Diego Trolley on the south. Major thoroughfares include Market Street and 47th Street.

== History ==
Chollas View is named after the large numbers of Cholla cactus that once covered the land. Holy Cross Cemetery opened in the area in 1919. During World War II, a defense housing project was built in the neighborhood. The neighborhood began to develop around the housing project in the 1950s.

== Demographics ==
The census tract that includes Chollas View has 4,634 residents. The Chollas View neighborhood is 62.2% Hispanic, 17.8% African-American, 15.9% Asian, 4.2% multiracial, 2.8% White, 0.9% Pacific Islander, and 0.7% Native American. Chollas View has a large Laotian American population, with roughly 12% of its residents of Laotian descent.

== Landmarks and facilities ==
- Holy Cross Cemetery
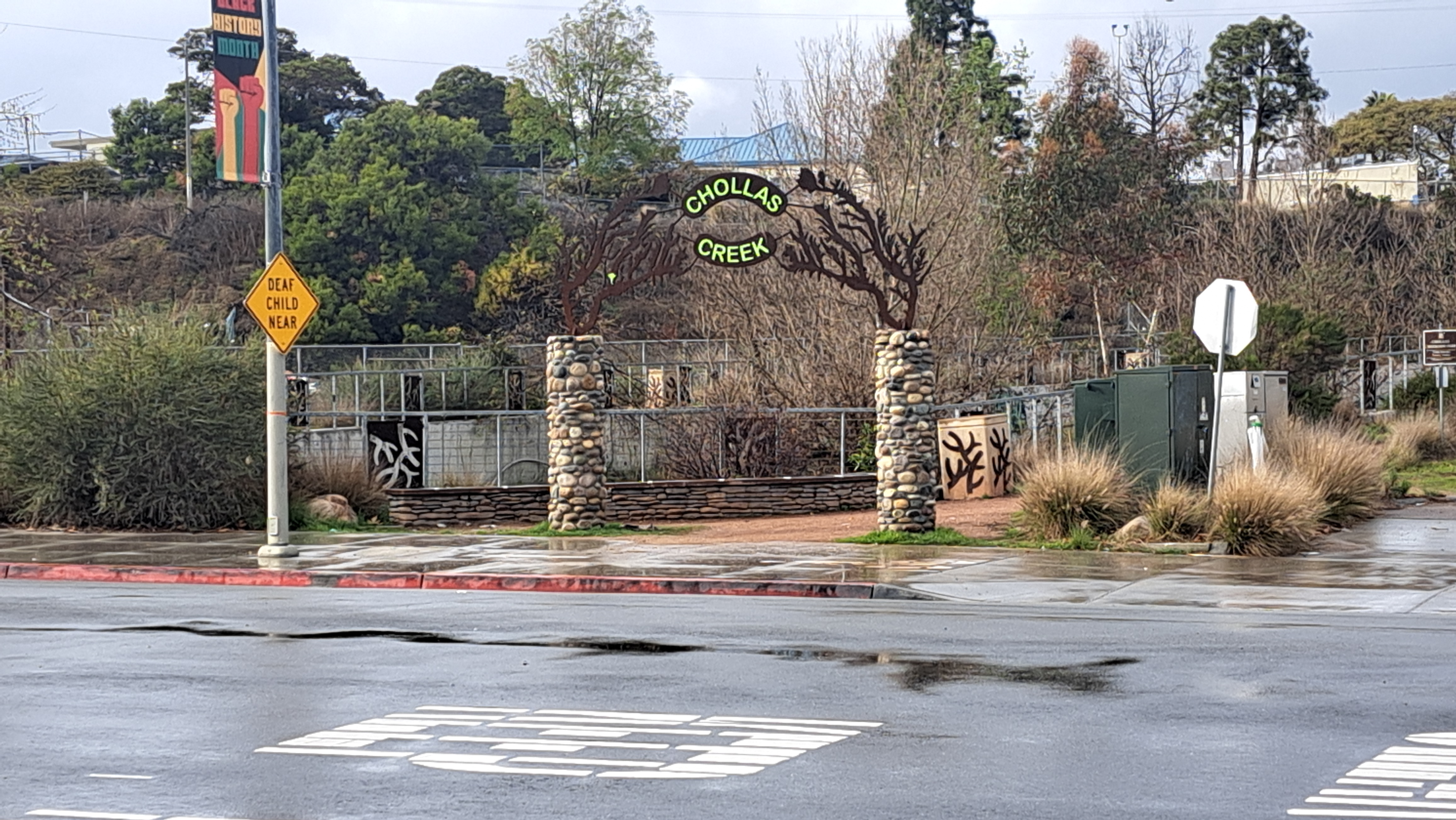
- Chollas Creek Park
  Chollas View Park
- Euclid Avenue Transit Station

== Education ==
The San Diego Unified School District serves Chollas View. Its Public schools include Gompers Preparatory Academy, Millennial Tech Middle School, and Horton Elementary School.
