= Charles L. Lewis (California politician) =

American politician (1966–2004)

Charles L. Lewis III
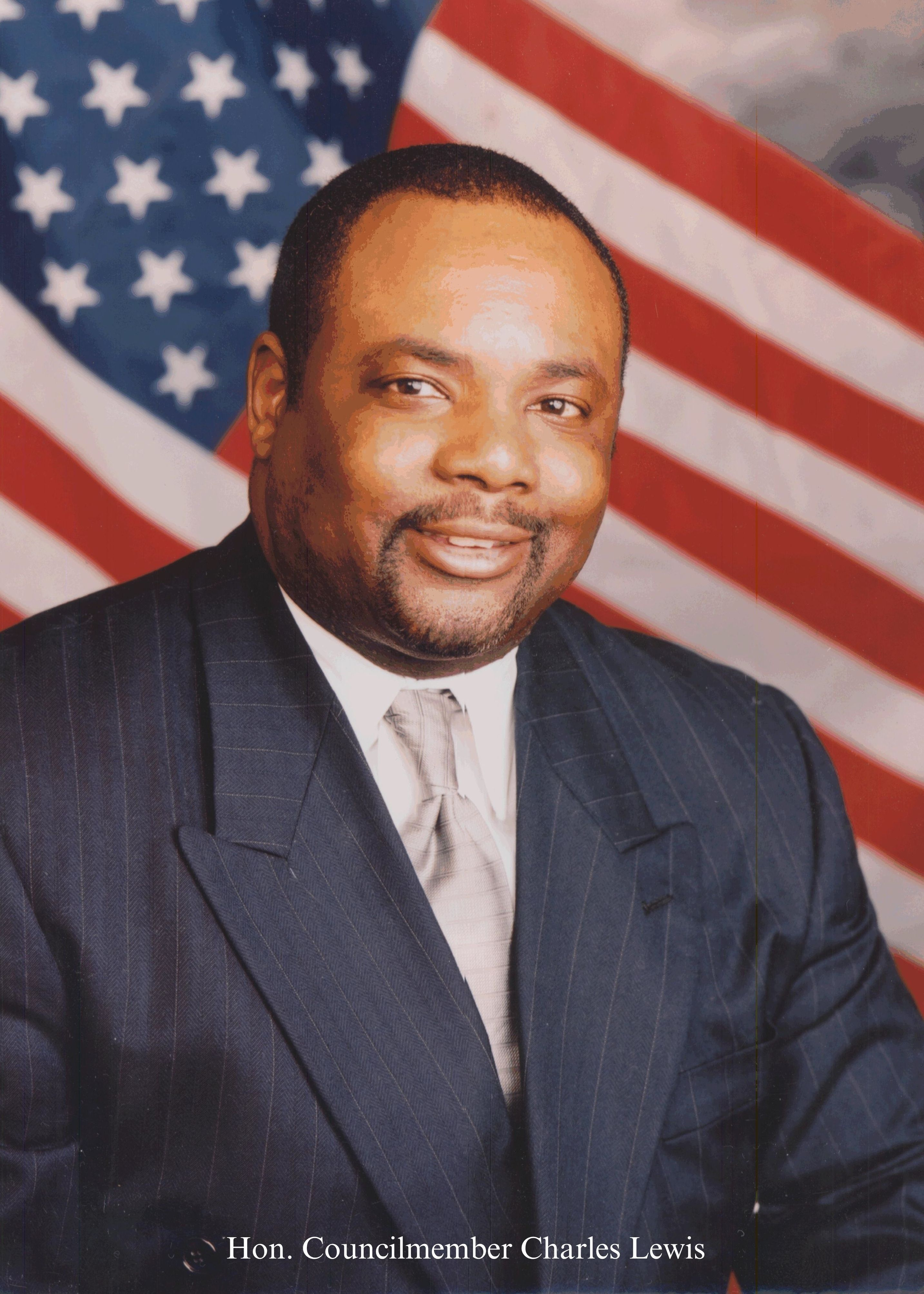

Member of San Diego City Council from the 4th district
- In office December 2002 – August 8, 2004
- Preceded by: George Stevens
- Succeeded by: Tony Young

Personal details
- Born: October 3, 1966 Tucson, Arizona
- Died: August 8, 2004 (aged 37) San Diego, California

Charles L. Lewis III (October 3, 1966 – August 8, 2004) was an American politician who served as a member of the San Diego City Council. He was elected in 2002 after serving as chief of staff to his predecessor, George Stevens. He died in office two years later, while under federal indictment on charges of bribery and corruption.

== Early life and education ==
Lewis was born October 3, 1966, in Tucson, Arizona. He grew up in the Skyline neighborhood of San Diego. He graduated from Morse High School in 1984, where he was on the wrestling and football teams. He then attended San Diego State University, earning a bachelor's degree in public administration in 1990. During his senior year, he served as an intern for U.S. Congressman Jim Bates.

== Career ==
He served as chief of staff for councilmember George Stephens for nearly a decade. Among his achievements while chief of staff, he coordinated the installation of holiday lighting on the Cabrillo Bridge and installed more than 80 "Dr. Martin Luther King Jr." signs on the California State Route 94 freeway - an installation which had been approved by the state 10 years earlier, but not funded.

When Stephens resigned due to term limits, Lewis was chosen to represent Council District 4 in his stead in the 2002 city council election. During his short term as council member he executed a deal to create a new park in City Heights, and spearheaded the creation of a skate park. Both parks are now named for him. He also played a key role in the creation of more than 20 neighborhood councils.

He died unexpectedly on August 8, 2004, of liver bleeding related to cirrhosis and alcohol intake. He was 37. The day before his death he had attended a 20th reunion for his high school class. His chief of staff, Tony Young, succeeded him in a special election.

=== Charges ===
On August 23, 2003, he and two other councilmembers were indicted on federal charges of taking bribes from a local strip club owner. All three pleaded not guilty. One of Lewis's aides and several representatives of the strip club were also charged.

The case against Lewis was dropped after his death. The other councilmembers were convicted by a jury in 2005.

== Personal life ==
He was married to Carlette Lewis; they had no children.

== Legacy ==
- The Charles L. Lewis III Foundation advocates and promotes healthy living and enhanced opportunities for underserved children and teens in San Diego.
- The Charles L. Lewis III Memorial Skatepark in Paradise Hills is named for him. Lewis was instrumental in getting the park built.
- A proposed park in City Heights is planned to be named after Lewis, who struck the deal to obtain the land.
- "Camp Charles" is an annual one-day event designed to match young males age 7–15 with mentors and a positive life experience.
