= Broadway Heights, San Diego =

- Community of San Diego
- Broadway Heights
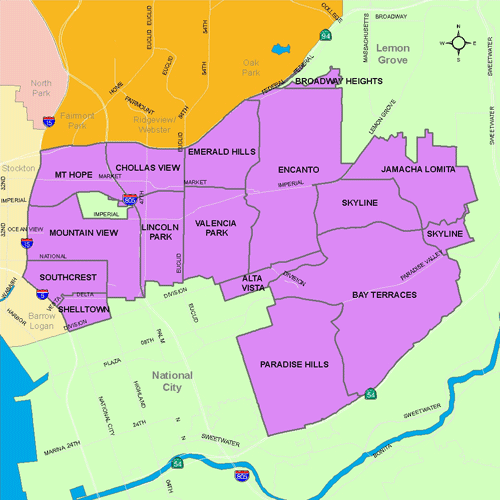
- Broadway Heights is located in the southeastern area of the city of San Diego

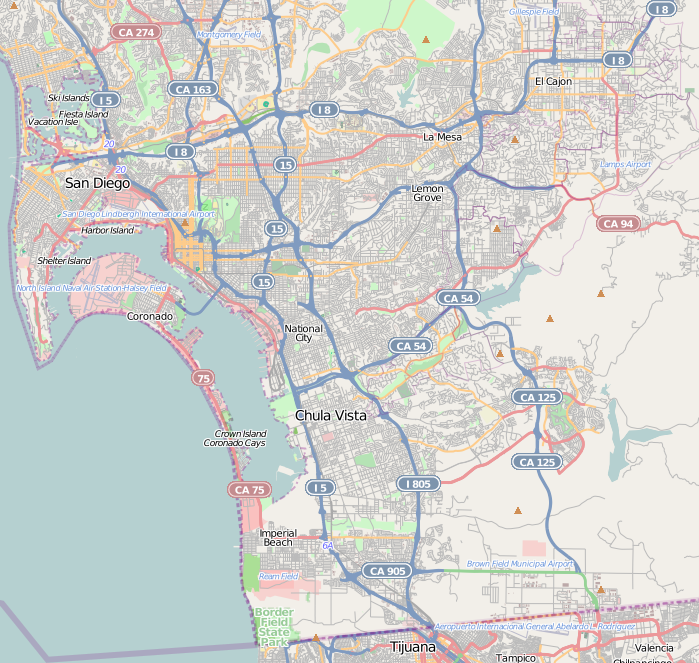
- Location within San Diego
- Coordinates: 32.7316°N 117.0522°W
- Country: United States of America
- State: California
- County: San Diego
- City: San Diego
- ZIP Code: 92114

Broadway Heights is a small community in the southeastern section of San Diego, California, United States. It is bordered on the north, east, and west by Lemon Grove, and on the south by Encanto and Mallard Street. The predominantly African-American community has 629 residents within its seven blocks. Weston Street was renamed to Martin Luther King Jr. Way (after the civil rights leader Martin Luther King Jr.) due to a youth campaign, marking the first time a street in San Diego was named after him.

== History ==
The Broadway Heights subdivision was approved in the 1950s. Most of the homes were built around 1960. In November 2010, Weston Street was renamed to Martin Luther King Jr. Way. This is the first street in San Diego that was named after Martin Luther King Jr., though a street was once named after him but overturned by voters. The change occurred as a result of members of the Broadway Heights Community Youth Council earlier in the year, in addition to planned improvements for their neighborhood. The children went about getting the street name changed after a campaign of signature gathering, letter writing, and visits to City Hall. The book "Community Resilience to Sectarian Violence in Baghdad" cites Broadway Heights as an example of a minority community in the San Diego area that keeps violence in its community down by addressing it head on. As of the publishing of the book, the murder rate for Broadway Heights was at 0%. Broadway Heights has a program called the Broadway Heights Community Council's Intergenerational Tour, wherein youth members participate in a leadership development program to receive mentorship, tutoring, and leadership skills training from the seniors of the community. This program was cited as an example of a successful intergenerational program by the book "Kraus' Recreation and Leisure in Modern Society".

== Education ==
Broadway Heights is served by San Diego Unified School District.
