= Webster, San Diego =

Coordinates: 32°43′36″N 117°05′41″W

Webster is a neighborhood of the Mid-City region of San Diego, California. It is predominantly Hispanic though it does have a sizable African-American population.

== Geography ==
Webster is located just east of Golden Hill, west of the city of Lemon Grove, north of National City, and south of the City Heights neighborhood. Its borders are defined by Home Avenue to the Northwest, Euclid Avenue to the East, and State Route 94 to the South. It is mostly residential but there are several businesses in the neighborhood.

The unofficial nickname for the community is "The Web".

== Education ==
- Webster Elementary School (San Diego Unified School District)
