= 2016 San Diego elections =

2016 San Diego City Council election
- November 8, 2016

5 of the 9 seats on the San Diego City Council
	Majority party	Minority party
Party	Democratic	Republican
Seats before	5	4
Seats after	5	4
Seat change	Steady	Steady
Council President before election
Sherri Lightner
Democratic
Elected Council President
Myrtle Cole
Democratic

Municipal elections were held in San Diego in 2016 for mayor, city attorney, city council, and ballot measures. The primary election was held on Tuesday, June 7, 2016, and the general election was held on Tuesday, November 8, 2016. Five of the nine council seats were contested. Two city council incumbents ran for reelection.

Municipal elections in California are officially non-partisan, although most members do identify a party preference. A two-round system was used for the election, starting with a primary in June followed by a runoff in November between the top-two candidates if no candidate received a majority of the votes in the first round.

== Mayor ==
Incumbent Kevin Faulconer ran for a second term as mayor against former San Diego City Councilmember Ed Harris and former California State Assemblymember Lori Saldaña. He won election in the primary with over 50% of the vote.

San Diego Mayoral primary election, 2016
Party	Candidate	Votes	%
Republican	Kevin Faulconer	181,147	57.2%
Independent	Lori Saldaña	73,932	23.3%
Democratic	Ed Harris	61,458	19.4%
Total votes		316,537	100%

== City Council ==
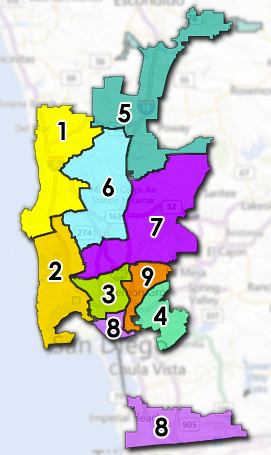
Council Districts used for the 2016 election

Seats in districts 1, 3, 5, 7, and 9 were up for election. Sherri Lightner (District 1) and Todd Gloria (District 3) were ineligible to run for re-election due to term limits. Incumbent Marti Emerald (District 9) chose not to seek reelection.

Republicans hoped to overturn the Democratic Party's 5–4 majority by flipping District 1 from Democratic to Republican.

=== District 1 ===
District 1 consists of the communities of Carmel Valley, Del Mar Mesa, Del Mar Heights, La Jolla, Pacific Highlands Ranch, Torrey Hills, Torrey Pines, and University City. Incumbent Sherri Lightner was ineligible to run due to term limits. Republican Ray Ellis and Democrats Barbara Bry and Joe LaCava were expected to run to replace Lightner. In January 2016, LaCava announced that he had decided not to run. Morning of March 3, 2016 Louis Rodolico entered the race followed that same afternoon by Bruce Lightner, husband to the incumbent Sherri Lightner, and Kyle Heiskala, two days layer a policy advisor on Sherri Lightner's City Council staff, pulled papers to run for the District 1 seat.

Since no candidate received a majority of the votes in the June primary, Bry and Ellis were slated to advance to the November runoff election. However, on August 12, 2016, Ellis announced that he would be withdrawing from the election. Despite effectively conceding the race, Ellis's name still appeared on November ballot. Bry was then elected to the City Council in November.

San Diego City Council District 1 election, 2016
Primary election
Party	Candidate	Votes	%
Democratic	Barbara Bry	18,559	48%
Republican	Ray Ellis	12,982	34%
Republican	Bruce D. Lightner	3,711	10%
Nonpartisan	Kyle Heiskala	2,344	6%
Nonpartisan	Louis A. Rodolico	707	2%
Total votes		38,303	100%
General election
Democratic	Barbara Bry	38,470	65%
Republican	Ray Ellis	20,305	35%
Total votes		58,775	100%

=== District 3 ===
District 3 consists of the communities of Balboa Park, Bankers Hill/Park West, Downtown San Diego, Golden Hill, Hillcrest, Little Italy, Mission Hills, Normal Heights, North Park, Old Town, South Park, and University Heights. Incumbent Todd Gloria was ineligible to run due to term limits. Chris Ward was elected in the June primary with a majority of the vote.

San Diego City Council District 3 election, 2016
Primary election
Party	Candidate	Votes	%
Democratic	Chris Ward	24,512	59%
Democratic	Anthony Bernal	11,492	27%
Nonpartisan	Scott Sanborn	5,800	14%
Total votes		41,804	100%

=== District 5 ===
District 5 consists of the neighborhoods of Black Mountain Ranch, Carmel Mountain Ranch, Miramar, Rancho Bernardo, Rancho Encantada, Rancho Peñasquitos, Sabre Springs, San Pasqual Valley, Scripps Ranch, and Torrey Highlands. Incumbent Mark Kersey was initially expected to run unopposed, but ultimately faced two opponents to his reelection. Kersey was reelected in the June primary with a majority of the vote.

San Diego City Council District 5 election, 2016
Primary election
Party	Candidate	Votes	%
Republican	Mark Kersey	23,858	71%
Democratic	Frank Tsimboukakis	6,784	20%
Democratic	Keith Mikas	3,157	9%
Total votes		33,799	100%

=== District 7 ===
District 7 consists of the neighborhoods of Allied Gardens, Del Cerro, Grantville, Linda Vista, Mission Valley, San Carlos, Serra Mesa, and Tierrasanta. Incumbent Scott Sherman filed to run for reelection. Sherman was reelected in the June primary with a majority of the vote.

San Diego City Council District 7 election, 2016
Primary election
Party	Candidate	Votes	%
Republican	Scott Sherman	22,040	60%
Democratic	Justin DeCesare	8,225	22%
Democratic	Jose Caballero	6,339	17%
Total votes		36,604	100%

=== District 9 ===
District 9 consists of the communities of Alvarado Estates, City Heights, College Area, College View Estates, El Cerrito, Kensington, Mountain View, Mount Hope, Rolando, Southcrest, and Talmadge. Incumbent Marti Emerald chose not to seek reelection. Since no candidate received a majority of the votes in the June primary, a runoff election was held in November 2016 between Ricardo Flores and Georgette Gomez. Gomez was then elected to the City Council in November.

San Diego City Council District 9 election, 2016
Primary election
Party	Candidate	Votes	%
Democratic	Ricardo Flores	7,348	34%
Democratic	Georgette Gomez	6,567	31%
Democratic	Sarah Saez	5,023	23%
Democratic	Araceli Martinez	2,589	12%
Total votes		21,527	100%
General election
Democratic	Georgette Gomez	20,075	55%
Democratic	Ricardo Flores	16,583	45%
Total votes		36,658	100%

=== Council President ===
On December 12, 2016, the new council was sworn in. For their first action, the council voted 6–3 to appoint Myrtle Cole as council president. David Alvarez, who was considered the other main candidate for the position, was joined in opposition to Cole's appointment by newly sworn in council members Ward and Gomez. Although both Alvarez and Cole were Democrats, Cole was seen as more moderate or centrist than Alvarez.

== Boards of Education ==
Three of the five seats on the independent San Diego Unified School District Board of Education were up for the general election. Richard Barrera ran unopposed. All three incumbents won reelection. Only one seat was up on the San Diego Community College District Board of Trustees. Incumbent Mary Graham won reelection.

San Diego Unified School District - District A
Party	Candidate	Votes	%
Democratic	John Lee Evans	216,948	68.32%
Democratic	Stephen Groce	100,577	31.68%
Total votes		317,525	100%

San Diego Unified School District - District D
Party	Candidate	Votes	%
Democratic	Richard Barrera	282,195	100%
Total votes		282,195	100%

San Diego Unified School District - District E
Party	Candidate	Votes	%
Nonpartisan	Sharon Whitehurst-Payne	172,347	54.78%
Democratic	Lashae Collins	142,293	45.22%
Total votes		314,640	100%

San Diego Community College District - District D
Party	Candidate	Votes	%
Nonpartisan	Mary Graham	204,445	64.28%
Democratic	Alyce Pipkin-Allen	112,461	35.36%
Total votes		318,030	100%

== June measures ==
=== Measure A ===
Ballot Title: Charter Amendments Regarding Redistricting of Council Districts in the City of San Diego

Ballot Language: "Shall the City Charter be amended to update the process related to redistricting of City Council districts, including amendments to expand the citizen Redistricting Commission from seven to nine members, to clarify and expand the timeline for the appointment and qualification of members, to provide for alternate members on the Commission and appointing panel, and to explain the effective date of boundaries."

Measure A
Choice	Votes	%
For	198,064	71.93
Against	77,306	28.07
Total	275,370	100.00
Registered voters/turnout		100.00

=== Measure B ===
Ballot Title: Charter Amendments Regarding the Authorization and Issuance of General Obligation Bonds and Revenue Bonds

Ballot Language: "Shall the City Charter be amended to update provisions related to the authorization and issuance of bonds, to reflect changes in state law, and simplify and conform the City's processes with the California Constitution?"

Measure B
Choice	Votes	%
For	215,776	79.31
Against	56,301	20.69
Total	272,077	100.00
Registered voters/turnout		100.00

=== Measure C ===
Ballot Title: Charter Amendments Regarding the Levy, Assessment and Collection of Property Taxes and the Repeal of Provisions for Collecting Property Taxes the City Cannot Collect Under State Law.

Ballot Language: "Shall the City Charter be amended to clarify the manner in which the City levies, assesses and collects property taxes in the City, and to repeal provisions regarding property taxes the City is not able to levy as a result of Proposition 13 and related state law?"

Measure C
Choice	Votes	%
For	184,271	67.32
Against	89,450	32.68
Total	273,721	100.00
Registered voters/turnout		100.00

=== Measure D ===
Ballot Title: Charter Amendment Regarding Power to Fix Salaries

Ballot Language: "Shall City Charter section 70 be amended to conform to existing provisions related to the strong mayor form of government, by updating titles of specified officers and clarifying who has authority to fix their salaries and the City's compensation schedules; to specify the City's legal duty to comply with California's collective bargaining laws in establishing annual compensation schedules; and to update language?"

Measure D
Choice	Votes	%
For	211,923	77.17
Against	62,683	22.83
Total	274,606	100.00
Registered voters/turnout		100.00

=== Measure E ===
Ballot Title: Charter Amendments Regarding the Budget and Appropriations Process for the City of San Diego

Ballot Language: "Shall the City Charter be amended to update the process related to budgeting and appropriating funds, to consolidate provisions that appeared throughout the Charter and to clarify the approval process for the City budget?"

Measure E
Choice	Votes	%
For	225,949	83.17
Against	45,719	16.83
Total	271,668	100.00
Registered voters/turnout		100.00

=== Measure F ===
Ballot Title: Charter Amendments Regarding Financial Operations of the City of San Diego

Ballot Language: "Shall the City Charter be amended to update the City's financial operations, including amendments regarding the certification of funds, the authorization and payment of claims, the management of funds, the disposition of proceeds of the sale of City-owned real property and the establishment of reserves?"

Measure F
Choice	Votes	%
For	218,384	81.13
Against	50,807	18.87
Total	269,191	100.00
Registered voters/turnout		100.00

=== Measure G ===
Ballot Title: Charter Amendment Regarding Audits of Accounts of City Officials and Officers Upon Their Death, Resignation, or Removal from City Office

Ballot Language: "Shall the City Charter be amended to update language and to repeal the requirement that the City Auditor conduct audits and investigations of City officials and officers upon their death, resignation, or removal from City office?"

Measure G
Choice	Votes	%
For	192,814	70.20
Against	81,853	29.80
Total	274,667	100.00
Registered voters/turnout		100.00

=== Measure H ===
Ballot Title: Charter Amendment: Infrastructure Fund

Ballot Language: "Shall the Charter be amended to require certain unrestricted General Fund revenues to be deposited in an Infrastructure Fund used exclusively to pay for capital improvements including streets, sidewalks, bridges, bike paths, storm water and drainage systems; public buildings including libraries, recreational and community centers; public safety facilities including police, fire and lifeguard stations; and park facilities, but expressly not used for new convention center facilities and new professional sports venues?"

Measure H
Choice	Votes	%
For	186,617	65.02
Against	100,395	34.98
Total	287,012	100.00
Registered voters/turnout		100.00

=== Measure I ===
Ballot Title: Referendum of Ordinance Regarding Earned Sick Leave and Minimum Wage

Ballot Language: "Shall Ordinance O-20390 be approved, establishing that employers are to compensate employees working in the City of San Diego with earned sick leave of up to forty hours a year and a minimum wage of $10.50 an hour upon the Ordinance's effective date, $11.50 an hour on January 1, 2017, and increasing with the cost of living on January 1, 2019 and annually thereafter?"

Measure I
Choice	Votes	%
For	193,300	63.84
Against	109,500	36.16
Total	302,800	100.00
Registered voters/turnout		100.00

== November measures ==
=== Measure A ===
Ballot Title: San Diego County Road Repair, Transit, Traffic Relief, Safety and Water Quality Measure

Ballot Language: "Shall an ordinance be adopted to: repair roads, deteriorating bridges; relieve congestion; provide every community funds for pothole/street repairs; expand public transit, including improved services for seniors, disabled, students, veterans; reduce polluted runoff; preserve open space to protect water quality/reduce wildfires by enacting, with independent oversight/audits, a 40-year, half-cent local sales tax ($308 million annually) that Sacramento cannot take away?"

Measure A
Choice	Votes	%
For	720,158	58.37
Against	513,646	41.63
Total	1,233,804	100.00
Registered voters/turnout		100.00

=== Measure B ===
Ballot Title: Ordinance Amending the County General Plan, County Zoning Map and County Code, and Adopting the Lilac Hills Ranch Specific Plan

Ballot Language: "Shall this Initiative be adopted for the purpose of amending the County General Plan, Zoning Ordinance and Code of Regulatory Ordinances and approving the Lilac Hills Ranch Specific Plan ("Plan")? The Plan provides for the development of a 608-acre master-planned community including 1,746 dwelling units, three commercial centers, a public park, 10 private parks and 16 miles of trails. The project site is generally located north of Escondido and east of I-15 in the unincorporated area of North San Diego County."

Measure B
Choice	Votes	%
For	422,322	36.46
Against	735,894	63.54
Total	1,158,216	100.00
Registered voters/turnout		100.00

=== Measure C ===
Ballot Title: Downtown Stadium Initiative

Ballot Language: "Should the measure be adopted to: increase San Diego's hotel occupancy tax by 6% to build a City-owned downtown professional football stadium and convention center project, and fund tourism marketing; effect the project financing, design, construction, use, management, and maintenance, including a $650,000,000 contribution and 30-year commitment by a professional football entity; end Tourism Marketing District assessments; adopt a development ordinance, and related land use, sign, and zoning laws?"

Measure C
Choice	Votes	%
For	237,597	43.64
Against	306,887	56.36
Total	544,484	100.00
Registered voters/turnout		100.00

=== Measure D ===
Ballot Title: Facilities and Tourism Tax Initiative

Ballot Language: "Should the measure be adopted to: among other provisions, increase San Diego's hotel occupancy tax up to 5%; end Tourism Marketing District; allow hoteliers to create assessment districts and use hotel occupancy taxes for downtown convention center and not a stadium; prohibit contiguous expansion of existing convention center; create downtown overlay zone for convention and sports facilities; create environmental processes; and allow Qualcomm stadium property's sale for educational and park uses?"

Measure D
Choice	Votes	%
For	211,739	41.12
Against	303,144	58.88
Total	514,883	100.00
Registered voters/turnout		100.00

=== Measure E ===
Ballot Title: Charter Amendment Regarding Qualifications, Vacancy, and Removal from Office for mayor, City Attorney, and City Council

Ballot Language: "Shall the Charter be amended to include a new article adding: incapacity, felony conviction, and removal as grounds for vacancies in office; a procedure for calling a special election to remove an officer for cause; a revised procedure for filling vacancies; to require the City Attorney be a licensed attorney; and to define authority during vacancies and enforcement of office forfeiture?"

Measure E
Choice	Votes	%
For	419,748	87.06
Against	62,400	12.94
Total	482,148	100.00
Registered voters/turnout		100.00

=== Measure F ===
Ballot Title: Charter Amendment Regarding Required Term of Service for Certain Terminations or Suspensions of Deputy City Attorneys

Ballot Language: "Shall the City Charter be amended to change the term of service required of Deputy City Attorneys, for protection from termination or suspension without good cause, from two years or more of continuous service to one year or more of continuous service, which protection would continue not to apply to layoffs due to lack of work or insufficient appropriations?"

Measure F
Choice	Votes	%
For	317,803	68.27
Against	147,720	31.73
Total	465,523	100.00
Registered voters/turnout		100.00

=== Measure G ===
Ballot Title: Charter Amendments Regarding The Citizens' Review Board on Police Practices

Ballot Language: "Shall section 43(d) of the City Charter be amended to rename the Citizens' Review Board on Police Practices as the Community Review Board on Police Practices, to replace references to "City Manager" with "Mayor and City Council," and to require the board to review all deaths occurring while someone is in the custody of the San Diego Police Department and all police officer-related shootings?"

Measure G
Choice	Votes	%
For	404,803	83.09
Against	82,372	16.91
Total	487,175	100.00
Registered voters/turnout		100.00

=== Measure H ===
Ballot Title: Charter Amendments Regarding Purchasing and Contracting Processes for the City of San Diego

Ballot Language: "Shall the City Charter be amended to: require contracts for public works, goods, services, and consultants to be awarded through a competitive process in accordance with rules adopted by ordinance, remove the position of Purchasing Agent, eliminate the requirement to publish certain notices in printed newspapers, and update other provisions consistent with state law?"

Measure H
Choice	Votes	%
For	360,127	77.09
Against	107,047	22.91
Total	467,174	100.00
Registered voters/turnout		100.00

=== Measure I ===
Ballot Title: Charter Amendment Regarding Balboa Park and San Diego High School

Ballot Language: "Shall City Charter section 55 be amended to authorize the City Council to lease the dedicated park property in Balboa Park currently occupied by San Diego High School, to the San Diego Unified School District for educational, cultural, recreational, and civic programs and activities, provided that the property is used for a public high school?"

Measure I
Choice	Votes	%
For	383,025	77.92
Against	108,565	22.08
Total	491,590	100.00
Registered voters/turnout		100.00

=== Measure J ===
Ballot Title: Charter Amendment Regarding Use of Lease Revenue from Mission Bay Park

Ballot Language: "Shall Charter section 55.2 be amended to: increase, from 25% to 35%, the allocation of annual Mission Bay Park lease revenues exceeding $20 million, for capital improvements in San Diego Regional Parks; allow Council to add City-owned parkland to Mission Bay Park's boundaries; combine and coordinate construction of Mission Bay Park improvements identified in this section; and extend operation of this section until 2069?"

Measure J
Choice	Votes	%
For	336,810	71.10
Against	136,933	28.90
Total	473,743	100.00
Registered voters/turnout		100.00

=== Measure K ===
Ballot Title: Charter Amendment Requiring Run-Off Election for the Offices of mayor, City Attorney, and Councilmember

Ballot Language: "Shall the Charter be amended to eliminate the provision that elects a candidate for mayor, City Attorney, or Councilmember to office if the candidate receives a majority vote in the June primary election, and instead require a run-off election at the November general election between the two candidates who received the most votes in the primary election?"

Measure K
Choice	Votes	%
For	280,075	59.03
Against	194,412	40.97
Total	474,487	100.00
Registered voters/turnout		100.00

=== Measure L ===
Ballot Title: Charter Amendment Regarding the Timing of Elections for Citizens' Initiative Measures and Referendum Measures

Ballot Language: "Shall the Charter be amended to require qualified citizens' initiative and referendum measures to be submitted to voters on the next November general election ballot and not at a June primary election, unless the Council chooses to submit the measure to voters prior to that election?"

Measure L
Choice	Votes	%
For	305,638	65.79
Against	158,911	34.21
Total	464,549	100.00
Registered voters/turnout		100.00

=== Measure M ===
Ballot Title: Affordable Housing: Increasing the Limit on the Number of Units the City and Certain Public Agencies are Allowed to Help Develop

Ballot Language: "Shall the voters increase by 38,680 the maximum number of housing units the City and certain other public agencies are allowed to help develop, construct, or acquire for people with low incomes, without this ballot measure approving specific housing units, providing funds for development, removing requirements that otherwise apply, or taking any other action?"

Measure M
Choice	Votes	%
For	328,588	66.41
Against	166,171	33.59
Total	494,759	100.00
Registered voters/turnout		100.00

=== Measure N ===
Ballot Title: Non-Medical Cannabis Business Tax

Ballot Language: "If California voters approve Proposition 64 legalizing marijuana in the state, shall the City adopt an ordinance imposing a gross receipts tax, for general revenue purposes, on non-medical cannabis (also known as marijuana) businesses operating in the City, initially set at 5% and increasing to 8% on July 1, 2019, having a maximum rate of 15%, generating an undetermined amount of revenue and continuing indefinitely?"

Measure N
Choice	Votes	%
For	351,088	68.68
Against	160,109	31.32
Total	511,197	100.00
Registered voters/turnout		100.00
