= 2020 San Diego mayoral election =

- November 3, 2020
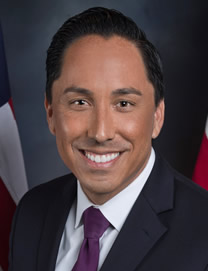

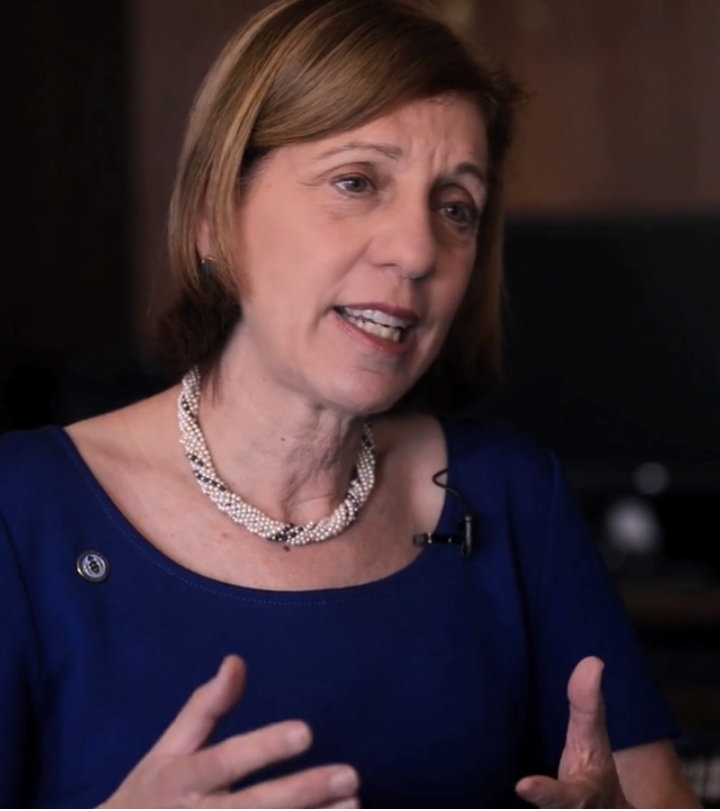
Candidate	Todd Gloria	Barbara Bry
Popular vote	346,662	272,887
Percentage	56.0%	44.0%
Mayor before election
Kevin Faulconer
Elected Mayor
Todd Gloria

The 2020 San Diego mayoral election was held on November 3, 2020, to elect the mayor of San Diego. Incumbent Kevin Faulconer was ineligible to run for a third term due to term limits.

The officially non-partisan primary election was held on March 3, 2020. The top two finishers, California State Assembly member and former acting mayor Todd Gloria and San Diego City Council president pro tem Barbara Bry advanced to the general election. This guaranteed that a Democrat would be elected mayor of San Diego for only the third time since 1971. (Note: Frank Curran's term expired in 1971.) Gloria was then elected mayor in the November 3 election, making him the first Native American and Filipino-American mayor elected in a US city of over a million people, as well as the city's first mayor of color and the city's first openly gay mayor.

== Candidates ==
Note: Municipal elections in California are officially nonpartisan. The parties below identify which party label each candidate would have run under if given the option.

=== Qualified ===
- Gita Appelbaum Singh, media host (party preference: Democratic)
- Barbara Bry, San Diego City Councillor (party preference: Democratic)
- Jarvis Gandy (write-in)
- Todd Gloria, California State Assemblymember and former Acting Mayor of San Diego (party preference: Democratic)
- Rich Riel, technology worker (party preference: Hogwash)
- Scott Sherman, San Diego City Councillor (party preference: Republican)
- Tasha Williamson, nonprofit executive (party preference: Democratic)

=== Declined ===
- Toni Atkins, California State Senator (party preference: Democratic)
- Cory Briggs, attorney (party preference: none)
- Chris Cate, San Diego City Councillor (party preference: Republican)
- John Cox, businessman and nominee for Governor of California in 2018 (party preference: Republican)
- Carl DeMaio, former member of San Diego City Council, and candidate for mayor in 2012 (party preference: Republican)
- Mark Kersey, San Diego City Councillor (party preference: none)
- Scott Peters, member of the United States House of Representatives (party preference: Democratic)
- Shelley Zimmerman, former Chief of Police of the San Diego Police Department (party preference: none)

== Campaign ==
The campaign for the mayor's office kicked off in early January 2019, when San Diego City Council president pro tem Barbara Bry and California State Assemblymember Todd Gloria officially announced their candidacies. They were joined in the race later that month by Tasha Williamson, a community activist who works with families who have lost members from police violence. In November 2019, with less than 100 days to go before the primary, city council member Scott Sherman became the first major Republican to file papers for the mayoral race.

One of the issues distinguishing the candidates from each other was housing policy. Local activist attorney Cory Briggs announced in January 2019 that he would run for mayor based on opposition to the loosening of development restrictions proposed by incumbent mayor Kevin Faulconer in his State of the City speech. However, Briggs dropped out of the race by May 2019. In a June 2019 campaign email, Bry came out in favor of strong local control over land use and against statewide legislation to preempt local governments' ability to restrict new development. Gloria favored statewide efforts to increase housing supply, aligning himself with the pro-housing development "Yes In My Back Yard" (YIMBY) movement. Sherman emphasized market-based solutions to housing upon his entry into the race in late 2019.

Another major issue was climate. Gloria emphasized his role in the establishment of the San Diego Climate Action Plan, while Bry called for the plan to be expanded and to have better metrics. Williamson spoke about environmental justice while Sherman attributed pollution to unhoused people.

In August 2019, Gloria was accused of collecting funds for his 2020 re-election campaign to the State Assembly before filing his intent to run with the state in violation of state law. Gloria claimed this was a technical oversight and filed the relevant paperwork the next day. In November 2019, Gloria settled the case with the California Fair Political Practices Commission, paying a $200 fine.

== Endorsements ==
Barbara Bry

Officeholders

- Richard Bailey, mayor of Coronado, California
- Donna Frye, former member of the San Diego City Council
- Mike Levin, U.S. Representative from California's 49th congressional district (2019–present)
- Dianne Jacob, member of the San Diego County Board of Supervisors

Newspapers

- La Prensa San Diego
- OB Rag, Ocean Beach, California
- San Diego Jewish World
- San Diego Monitor News
- San Diego Voice & Viewpoint

Organizations

- Black Mountain Democratic Club
- La Jolla Democratic Club, La Jolla, California
- National Organization for Women (NOW) CalifiaNOW
- Run Women Run
- Torrey Pines Democratic Club
- Uptown Democratic Club

Individuals

- Father Joe Carroll
- Peter Cooper, arts patron and LGBT activist
- Ann Dynes, environmental advocate
- Robert Dynes, former Chancellor of the UCSD; former President of the University of California (UC) system
- Sunday Gover, 2018 candidate for California's 77th State Assembly district
- Abdur-Rahim Hameed, President and CEO at National Black Contractors Association
- Marc Johnson, University Heights resident, community leader
- Geneviéve Jones-Wright, 2018 candidate for San Diego County District Attorney
- Rita Lim-Wilby, community business owner, social advocate
- Dr. Alan Mobley, Director of Center for Transformative Justice; Executive Director of SDSU Project Rebound
- Gentry Patrick, PhD, Professor of Neurobiology and Creator and Faculty Director of the PATHS Scholar Program, UC San Diego
- Lynn Schenk, former congresswoman
- Pam Slater-Price, former county supervisor
- Richard Ybarra, San Diego Community Leader and son-in-law of Cesar Chavez
Todd Gloria

Officeholders

- Toni Atkins, President pro tempore of the California State Senate
- Xavier Becerra, California Attorney General (2017–2021)
- Jerry Brown, 34th and 39th Governor of California (1975–1983, 2011–2019)
- Jennifer Campbell, member of the San Diego City Council
- Susan Davis, U.S. Representative from California's 53rd congressional district (2001–2021)
- Serge Dedina, mayor of Imperial Beach
- Mara Elliott, San Diego City Attorney
- Dianne Feinstein, United States Senator for California (1992–present)
- Nathan Fletcher, member of the San Diego County Board of Supervisors
- Georgette Gómez, San Diego City Council President
- Kamala Harris, United States Senator for California (2017–2021); 2020 vice presidential nominee
- Christine Kehoe, former member of the California State Senate
- Eleni Kounalakis, California Lieutenant Governor (2019–present)
- Ricardo Lara, California Insurance Commissioner (2019–present)
- Fiona Ma, California State Treasurer (2019–present)
- Gavin Newsom, Governor of California (2019–present), former Lieutenant Governor of California (2011–2019) and former Mayor of San Francisco (2004–2011)
- Alex Padilla, California Secretary of State (2015–2021)
- Scott Peters, U.S. Representative from California's 52nd congressional district (2013–present)
- Mary Salas, mayor of Chula Vista
- Tony Thurmond, California State Superintendent of Public Instruction (2019–present)
- Juan Vargas, U.S. Representative from California's 51st congressional district (2013–present)
- Chris Ward, member of the San Diego City Council
- Betty Yee, California State Controller (2015–present)
- All 60 members of the California State Assembly Democratic caucus

Newspapers

- San Diego Union-Tribune

Organizations

- Equality California
- Laborers' International Union of North America, Local 89
- League of Conservation Voters San Diego
- San Diego & Imperial Counties Labor Council, AFL–CIO
- San Diego Chamber of Commerce
- San Diego City Firefighters Association, International Association of Fire Fighters Local 145
- San Diego County Democratic Party
- San Diego Municipal Employees Association
- San Diego Police Officers Association
- Service Employees International Union
Scott Sherman

Officeholders

- Kevin Faulconer, Mayor of San Diego

Organizations

- Lincoln Club of San Diego County
- San Diego County Republican Party

== Primary election ==
The primary election was held on Tuesday, March 3, 2020. In the initial results, Gloria led with more than 40% of the vote and was projected to advance to the general election. Sherman narrowly led Bry by a little over 3,000 votes for the second spot in the general election. By the second day of counting, Bry had reduced Sherman's margin for the second spot by 30 percent to 2,140. Bry continued to gain on Sherman as more votes were counted, and on March 16 her votes surpassed his. The final results released in early April confirmed that Gloria would face Bry in the runoff election. This guaranteed that a Democrat would be elected mayor of San Diego for only the third time since 1971.

=== Results ===
2020 San Diego mayoral primary election results
Candidate	Votes	%
Todd Gloria	147,654	41.5%
Barbara Bry	81,541	22.9%
Scott Sherman	80,352	22.6%
Tasha Williamson	25,629	7.2%
Gita Appelbaum Singh	12,716	3.6%
Rich Riel	8,067	2.3%
Jarvis Gandy (write-in)	3	0.0%
Total votes	355,994	100%

== General election ==
=== Polling ===
View source data.

Poll source	Date(s) administered	Sample size (Note: Key: A – all adults RV – registered voters LV – likely voters V – unclear)	Margin of error	Barbara Bry	Todd Gloria	Other	Undecided
FM3 Research/Voice of San Diego	Oct. 8–22, 2020	580 (LV)	± 4.1%	32%	36%	–	32%
SurveyUSA/KGTV-TV/San Diego Union-Tribune	Oct. 1–5, 2020	547 (LV)	± 5.3%	38%	39%	–	24%
SurveyUSA/KGTV-TV/San Diego Union-Tribune	Aug. 28–31, 2020	517 (LV)	± 5.3%	37%	34%	–	29%
Strategies 360/Todd Gloria (Note: Poll sponsored by Todd Gloria's campaign)	Jul. 15–19, 2020	406 (LV)	± 4.9%	26%	41%	–	33%
GS Strategy Group/San Diego Lincoln Club	Jun. 22–26, 2020	400 (LV)	± 4.9%	31%	34%	11% (Note: "Neither" with 11%)	24%

=== Results ===
Todd Gloria wins 2020 San Diego mayoral election after Barbara Bry concedes.
Candidate	Votes	%
Todd Gloria	346,662	55.95%
Barbara Bry	272,887	44.05%
Total votes	619,549	100.00%
