= Scott Sherman (politician) =

American politician

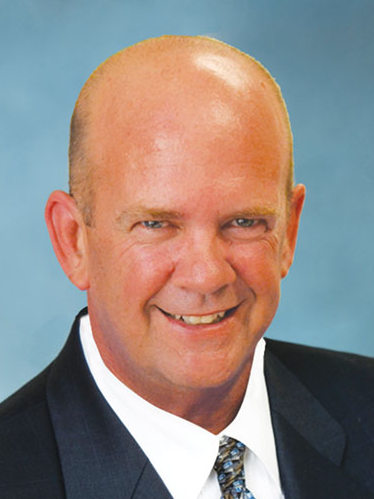

Member of the San Diego City Council from the 7th district
- In office December 3, 2012 – December 10, 2020
- Mayor: Bob Filner; Kevin Faulconer
- Preceded by: Marti Emerald
- Succeeded by: Raul Campillo

Personal details
- Party: Republican
- Education: Grossmont Community College
- Website: City Council District 7 website

Scott Sherman is an American politician who served as a member of the San Diego City Council from 2012 to 2020, representing District 7. A member of the Republican party, he represented the neighborhoods of Allied Gardens, Del Cerro, Linda Vista, Mission Valley, San Carlos, Serra Mesa, Tierrasanta, and Lake Murray.

== Personal information ==
Sherman grew up in a military family. He has lived in San Diego since he was 5 months old. He attended Patrick Henry High School and Grossmont Community College. He is an insurance agent, with a focus on maritime insurance. He is an avid boater and fisherman. He and his wife, the former Norma Mouett, live in the Allied Gardens neighborhood near where he grew up.

== Public service ==
=== San Diego City Council ===
Sherman ran for the District 7 council seat in the 2012 election after District 7 incumbent Marti Emerald decided to run in the newly created District 9 seat. Sherman was recruited to run by then-councilmember Carl DeMaio. He had not previously been active in politics.

In the June 2012 primary he earned 50.09% of the vote, edging out three competitors to win the seat outright and avoid a November runoff. He took office December 3, 2012.

Sherman was part of a coordinated three-person slate supported by the local Republican Party in an attempt to gain a Republican majority on the nine-member council. Sherman and fellow Republican Mark Kersey won their seats, but the third candidate, Ray Ellis, lost to incumbent Sherri Lightner, so that the council retained a 5-4 Democratic majority.

Sherman was elected to a second term in June 2016. He was termed out of his council position in 2020 and was replaced by Raul Campillo.

==== Committee assignments ====
- Audit Committee (chair)
  - Budget Review Committee
- Environment Committee
- Land Use and Housing Committee

Source: Office of the City Clerk

=== 2020 San Diego mayoral election candidacy ===
On November 27, 2019, Sherman filed as a candidate in the 2020 San Diego mayoral election. He was the only Republican candidate to enter the race. He was narrowly eliminated in the primary.

== Electoral history ==
2020 San Diego mayoral election
Primary election
Party	Candidate	Votes	%
Nonpartisan	Todd Gloria	147,654	41.5%
Nonpartisan	Barbara Bry	81,541	22.9%
Nonpartisan	Scott Sherman	80,352	22.6%
Nonpartisan	Tasha Williamson	25,629	7.2%
Nonpartisan	Gita Applebaum Singh	12,716	3.6%
Nonpartisan	Rich Riel	8,067	2.3%
Write-In	Jarvis Gandy	3	0.0%
Total votes		355,994	100%
General election
Nonpartisan	Barbara Bry		
Nonpartisan	Todd Gloria		
Total votes			100%

San Diego City Council District 7 election, 2016
Primary election
Party	Candidate	Votes	%
Nonpartisan	Scott Sherman	22,040	60%
Nonpartisan	Justin DeCesare	8,225	22%
Nonpartisan	Jose Caballero	6,339	17%
Total votes		36,604	100%

San Diego City Council District 7 election, 2012
Primary election
Party	Candidate	Votes	%
Nonpartisan	Scott Sherman	15,575	50.17
Nonpartisan	Mat Kostrinsky	12,462	40.14
Nonpartisan	Rik Hauptfeld	1,794	5.78
Nonpartisan	Nathan E. Johnson	1,212	3.90
Total votes		31,043	100%
