= 2012 San Diego elections =

2012 San Diego City Council election
- November 6, 2012

5 of the 9 seats on the San Diego City Council
	Majority party	Minority party
Party	Democratic	Republican
Seats before	5	3
Seats after	5	4
Seat change	Steady	▲1
Council President before election
Tony Young
Democratic
Elected Council President
Todd Gloria
Democratic

Municipal elections were held in San Diego in 2012 for mayor, city attorney, five seats to the San Diego City Council, and propositions. The primary election was held on June 5, 2012, and the general election was held on November 6, 2012. This was the first city council election to use nine council districts. Two city council incumbents ran for reelection in their same district and one ran for election in the newly created ninth district.

Municipal elections in California are officially non-partisan, although most members do identify a party preference. A two-round system was used for the election, starting with a primary in June followed by a runoff in November between the top-two candidates if no candidate received a majority of the votes in the first round.

== Mayor ==
After a contentious race during the June primary, Congressman Bob Filner was elected mayor with a majority of the votes in the November election.

== City Council ==
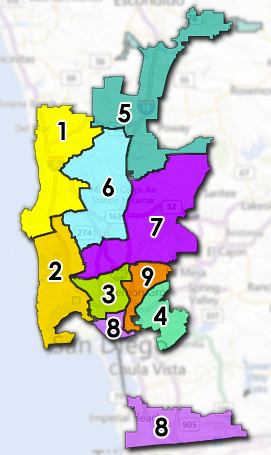
Council Districts used for the 2012 election

The 2012 election was the first to use the new districts created by the 2010 Redistricting Commission. Seats in districts 1, 3, 5, 7, and 9 were up for election.

Carl DeMaio did not run for re-election when his term expired in 2012; he was replaced by Mark Kersey, who ran unopposed for the District 5 seat. Scott Sherman was narrowly elected in June to the District 7 seat, which had no incumbent. Todd Gloria (District 3) and Marti Emerald (District 9) won re-election by getting more than 50% in the June primary. Sherri Lightner (District 1) was forced into a November runoff which she won, 55% to 45%.

During the 2012 election cycle the local Republican Party made a strong bid to take over the majority on the (officially nonpartisan) city council. They ran a coordinated slate of three candidates, of whom Mark Kersey and Scott Sherman were elected to seats with no incumbent, but Ray Ellis lost to incumbent Sherri Lightner, so that the council maintained a partisan balance of five Democrats and four Republicans.

=== District 1 ===
District 1 consists of the communities of Carmel Valley, Del Mar Mesa, Del Mar Heights, La Jolla, Pacific Highlands Ranch, Torrey Hills, Torrey Pines, and University City. Incumbent council member Sherri Lightner ran for reelection. Although she received fewer votes than Ray Ellis in the June primary, she was reelected with a majority of the vote in the November general election.

San Diego City Council District 1 election, 2012
Primary election
Party	Candidate	Votes	%
Republican	Ray Ellis	14,133	45.61
Democratic	Sherri Lightner	12,889	41.59
Democratic	Bryan Pease	2,210	7.13
Nonpartisan	Dennis Ridz	1,755	5.66
Total votes		30,987	100
General election
Democratic	Sherri Lightner	31,585	54.96
Republican	Ray Ellis	25,881	45.04
Total votes		57,466	100

=== District 3 ===
District 3 consists of the communities of Balboa Park, Bankers Hill/Park West, Downtown San Diego, Golden Hill, Hillcrest, Little Italy, Mission Hills, Normal Heights, North Park, Old Town, South Park, and University Heights. Incumbent council member Todd Gloria ran for reelection unopposed.

San Diego City Council District 3 election, 2012
Primary election
Party	Candidate	Votes	%
Democratic	Todd Gloria	24,475	100.00
Total votes		24,475	100

=== District 5 ===
District 5 consists of the neighborhoods of Black Mountain Ranch, Carmel Mountain Ranch, Miramar, Rancho Bernardo, Rancho Encantada, Rancho Peñasquitos, Sabre Springs, San Pasqual Valley, Scripps Ranch, and Torrey Highlands. Incumbent council member Carl DeMaio chose not run for reelection so that he could instead run for mayor of San Diego. Mark Kersey ran for the empty seat unopposed.

San Diego City Council District 5 election, 2012
Primary election
Party	Candidate	Votes	%
Republican	Mark Kersey	24,869	100.00
Total votes		24,869	100

=== District 7 ===
District 7 consists of the neighborhoods of Allied Gardens, Del Cerro, Grantville, Linda Vista, Mission Valley, San Carlos, Serra Mesa, and Tierrasanta. Incumbent council member Marti Emerald chose to run for reelection in the newly created district 9 instead of district 7. Scott Sherman was elected with a majority of the vote in the June primary.

San Diego City Council District 7 election, 2012
Primary election
Party	Candidate	Votes	%
Republican	Scott Sherman	15,575	50.17
Democratic	Mat Kostrinsky	12,462	40.14
Nonpartisan	Rik Hauptfeld	1,794	5.78
Nonpartisan	Nathan E. Johnson	1,212	3.90
Total votes		31,043	100

=== District 9 ===
District 9 consists of the communities of Alvarado Estates, City Heights, College Area, College View Estates, El Cerrito, Kensington, Mountain View, Mount Hope, Rolando, Southcrest, and Talmadge. Incumbent council member from district 7 Marti Emerald chose to run for reelection in the newly created district 9. She was elected with a majority of the vote in the June primary election.

San Diego City Council District 9 election, 2012
Primary election
Party	Candidate	Votes	%
Democratic	Marti Emerald	10,107	72.14
Democratic	Mateo Camarillo	3,904	27.86
Total votes		14,011	100

=== Aftermath ===
The new city council was sworn in on December 3, 2012. The week after the election, Council President Tony Young announced that he would resign from the City Council to become CEO of the San Diego-Imperial Counties chapter of the American Red Cross. His resignation on January 1, 2013, triggered a special election for the balance of his term, which ended in 2014. At its first meeting the Council unanimously elected Todd Gloria to succeed him as Council President. On May 21, 2013 Myrtle Cole was elected to finish the remainder of Young's term.

== June propositions ==
=== Proposition A ===
Ballot Title: Prohibits the City from Requiring Project Labor Agreements on City Construction Projects

Ballot Language: "Should the City of San Diego be prohibited from requiring contractors to use Project Labor Agreements for City construction projects, except where required by law, and should the Mayor be required to post online all construction contracts over $25,000?"

Proposition A
Choice	Votes	%
For	134,724	58.09
Against	97,209	41.91
Total	231,933	100.00
Registered voters/turnout		100.00

=== Proposition B ===
Ballot Title: Amends City Charter Regarding Retirement Benefits

Ballot Language: "Should the Charter be amended to: direct City negotiators to seek limits on a City employee's compensation used to calculate pension benefits; eliminate defined benefit pensions for all new City Officials and employees, except police officers, substituting a defined contribution 401(k)-type plan; require substantially equal pension contributions from the City and employees; and eliminate, if permissible, a vote of employees or retirees to change their benefits?"

Proposition B
Choice	Votes	%
For	154,216	65.81
Against	80,126	34.19
Total	234,342	100.00
Registered voters/turnout		100.00
