= 2008 San Diego City Council election =

- November 4, 2008

4 of the 8 seats on the San Diego City Council
	Majority party	Minority party
Party	Democratic	Republican
Seats before	5	3
Seats after	6	2
Seat change	▲1	▼1
Council President before election
Scott Peters
Democratic
Elected Council President
Ben Hueso
Democratic

The 2008 San Diego City Council election occurred on November 4, 2008. The primary election was held on June 5, 2008. Four of the eight seats of the San Diego City Council were contested. This was the last election for the odd-numbered districts using the boundaries created by the 2000 Redistricting Committee. No incumbent council members were eligible to run for reelection due to term limits.

Municipal elections in California are officially non-partisan, although most members do identify a party preference. A two-round system was used for the election, starting with a primary in June followed by a runoff in November between the top-two candidates if no candidate received a majority of the votes in the first round.

== Campaign ==
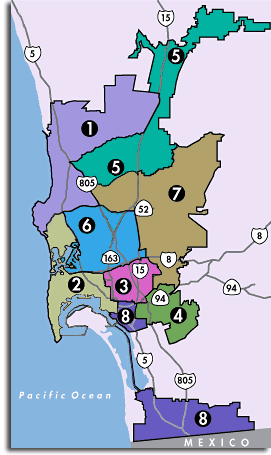
Council Districts used for the 2008 election

The 2008 election was the last to use the eight district boundaries created by the 2000 Redistricting Commission for the odd numbered districts. Seats in districts 1, 3, 5, and 7 were up for election.

Prior to 2008, there had been two openly gay members of the San Diego City Council: Christine Kehoe and Toni Atkins, both from the Third District. In the June primary for District 5, Carl DeMaio, a Republican, won a majority of the vote to become San Diego's first openly gay man and gay Republican elected to city council (after Christine Kehoe and Toni Atkins, both lesbians and Democrats). In the November general election, Todd Gloria, joined him, resulting in the first occasion that two openly gay council members served concurrently.

== Results ==
=== District 1 ===
District 1 consisted of the communities of Black Mountain Ranch, Carmel Valley, Del Mar Mesa, La Jolla, Pacific Highlands Ranch, Rancho Peñasquitos, Torrey Highlands, Torrey Hills, Torrey Pines, and University City. Incumbent council member Scott Peters was ineligible to run due to term limits. After advancing out of the primary with a plurality of the vote Sherri Lightner was elected with a majority of the vote in the general election.

San Diego City Council District 1 election, 2008
Primary election
Party	Candidate	Votes	%
Democratic	Sherri Lightner	12,708	36.56
Republican	Phil Thalheimer	11,777	33.88
Republican	Marshall Merrifield	10,278	29.57
Total votes		34,763	100
General election
Democratic	Sherri Lightner	40,282	51.80
Republican	Phil Thalheimer	37,360	48.20
Total votes		77,855	100

=== District 3 ===
District 3 consisted of the communities of Balboa Park, City Heights, Golden Hill, Hillcrest, Kensington, Normal Heights, North Park, South Park, Talmadge, and University Heights. Incumbent council member Toni Atkins was ineligible to run for reelection due to term limits. After advancing out of the primary with a plurality of the vote Todd Gloria was elected with a majority of the vote in the general election.

San Diego City Council District 3 election, 2008
Primary election
Party	Candidate	Votes	%
Democratic	Todd Gloria	9,288	40.64
Democratic	Stephen Whitburn	6,543	28.63
Democratic	John Hartley	4,018	17.58
Nonpartisan	Paul Broadway	1,428	6.25
Nonpartisan	Robert E. Lee	840	3.68
Nonpartisan	James Hartline	739	3.23
Total votes		22,856	100
General election
Democratic	Todd Gloria	27,922	54.60
Democratic	Stephen Whitburn	23,191	45.40
Total votes		51,398	100

=== District 5 ===
District 5 consisted of the communities of Carmel Mountain Ranch, Mira Mesa, Rancho Bernardo, Sabre Springs, Scripps Ranch, and San Pasqual. Incumbent council member Brian Maienschein was ineligible to run for reelection due to term limits. Carl DeMaio was elected with the majority of the vote in the primary election.

San Diego City Council District 5 election, 2008
Primary election
Party	Candidate	Votes	%
Republican	Carl DeMaio	19,461	66.16
Democratic	George George	9,953	33.84
Total votes		29,414	100

=== District 7 ===
District 7 consisted of the communities of Allied Gardens, City Heights, College Area, Del Cerro, El Cerrito, Grantville, MCAS Miramar, Mission Trails Regional Park, Redwood Village – Oak Park, Rolando, San Carlos, Stonebridge Estates, and Tierrasanta. Incumbent council member Jim Madaffer was ineligible to run for reelection due to term limits. After advancing out of the primary with the second-most votes, Marti Emerald was elected with a majority of the vote in the general election.

San Diego City Council District 7 election, 2008
Primary election
Party	Candidate	Votes	%
Republican	April Boling	13,794	46.55
Democratic	Marti Emerald	13,392	45.19
Nonpartisan	David Tos	1,442	4.87
Nonpartisan	Bill Daniel	1,004	3.39
Total votes		29,632	100
General election
Democratic	Marti Emerald	27,836	50.55
Republican	April Boling	27,228	49.45
Total votes		55,197	100

== Council President ==
The new city council was sworn in December 2008. Ben Hueso was elected as council president in a 6–2 vote by his fellow council members.
