= The San Diego Door =

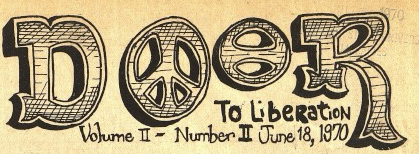
The Door Masthead - 18Jun1970

The San Diego Door (in former versions: Good Morning Teaspoon, Teaspoon Door, Door to Liberation, and Free Door) was an underground newspaper that thrived from January 1968 to August 1974 in San Diego and San Diego County, California.

Alongside the San Diego Street Journal (formerly San Diego Free Press) and the OB Rag, it dominated the underground genre. They all contained anti-war and anti-establishment articles on business interests in San Diego during the 1960s. The newspapers encompassed New Left issues, and the birth of the Chicano Movement and second-wave women's movement within San Diego.

== History ==
Founded by publisher Dale Herschler in January 1968 and published on a biweekly schedule, The San Diego Door was initially based in La Mesa and loosely connected to campus activism at nearby San Diego State University.

Good Morning, Teaspoon, began as a local underground which first published in October 1966, and was edited by Don Monkerud, Jim Willems, and Jon Gulledge. The new editor, Jim Milligan, published a citywide paper in February 1968. In the summer of 1968, Good Morning Teaspoon merged with and began being published under the titles Teaspoon and Door and Teaspoon Door for a few issues, before reverting to The San Diego Door.

In 1969 the paper became Door to Liberation, and after switching to free distribution in local drop boxes, with a 10,000 copy run, it became the Free Door to Liberation.

In May 1970, after 53 issues, The Door was rebooted with a staff shake-up. Dale Herschler left and the remaining staff adopted a gentler, more laid-back and hippie-ish look and feel for the paper. A few months later the San Diego Free Press was launched by students at the University of California, San Diego as a more strongly New Left politically oriented newspaper in the local underground press.

=== Music journalism references ===
Reference to the long defunct underground San Diego Door newspaper was made in the 2000 film Almost Famous by Cameron Crowe . The film is a semi-autobiographical story of Crowe's early years writing for The Door and Rolling Stone magazine. Crowe was something of a young literary phenom writing for popular music industry magazines such as Creem and Rolling Stone at a very young age. However, before that he was a contributor to The San Diego Door, where a clip that he wrote caught the attention of Ben Fong Torres at Rolling Stone.

Music critic and journalist Lester Bangs, who then lived in El Cajon, also had a connection to the newspaper before he became a freelance writer at Rolling Stone and Creem magazines.

== Other local underground newspapers ==
Other San Diego underground newspapers that dealt with related issues included: the OB People's Rag (food cooperatives and housing); State College Railroad (academic freedom and anti-war); Carpetbagger Express (regarding the 1972 Republican Convention in Miami); San Diego Wildcat (labor issues); Inside the Beast (third world-oriented articles); and Sunrise and Goodbye to All That (feminist issues).

Archives

The San Diego Door and others are part of a group of newspapers preserved in the San Diego Historical Society's Archives. The archives contain a series of "underground press" newspapers from the late 1960s and early 1970s. An almost complete online archive of The Door can be found at revealdigital.org.

== See also ==
- List of underground newspapers of the 1960s counterculture
