= Marti Emerald =

American politician

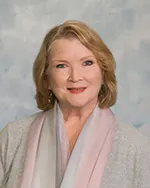
- Marti Emerald, member of the Sweetwater Union High School District Board of Trustees, 2022.

Member of San Diego City Council from the 9th District
- In office December 3, 2012 – December 12, 2016
- Preceded by: New district
- Succeeded by: Georgette Gomez

Member of San Diego City Council from the 7th District
- In office December 2008 – December 3, 2012
- Preceded by: Jim Madaffer
- Succeeded by: Scott Sherman

Personal details
- Party: Democratic
- Education: National University

Marti Emerald is an American politician and former television journalist who served as a member of the San Diego City Council representing District 7 from 2008 to 2012 and District 9 from 2012 to 2016. She is a Democrat, although city council positions are officially nonpartisan per California state law.

== Personal ==
She is a graduate of National University and lives in Imperial Beach. She was married to attorney Michael Klarfeld until his death in 2011, and she has one daughter. She married Karl Bradley in November 2014. She is Jewish.

== Television career ==
Before entering politics she was a television journalist for 30 years, including 22 years as the "Troubleshooter" (consumer advocate) at San Diego's ABC affiliate, KGTV. The program was popular, although she was sometimes accused of "ambush journalism".

== City Council ==
She was elected to represent Council District 7 in the 2008 election. In the June 2012 primary, Emerald was elected to represent the newly created Council District 9, effective December 2012. District 9 is centered in City Heights and extends from Kensington and Talmadge to the north through City Heights down to Mountain View and Southcrest.

On the City Council she chairs the Public Safety and Neighborhood Services Committee and also serves on the Natural Resources and Culture Committee and the Infrastructure Committee. Her top priorities are voter registration, public safety, and redevelopment.

Upon entering the San Diego City Council in 2008, Emerald was investigated for campaign ethics violations. She was eventually fined $3,000 for late reporting of two payments.

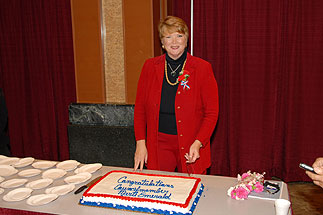
San Diego City Council Member Marti Emerald in 2011.
