= Barbara Bry =

American politician (born 1949)

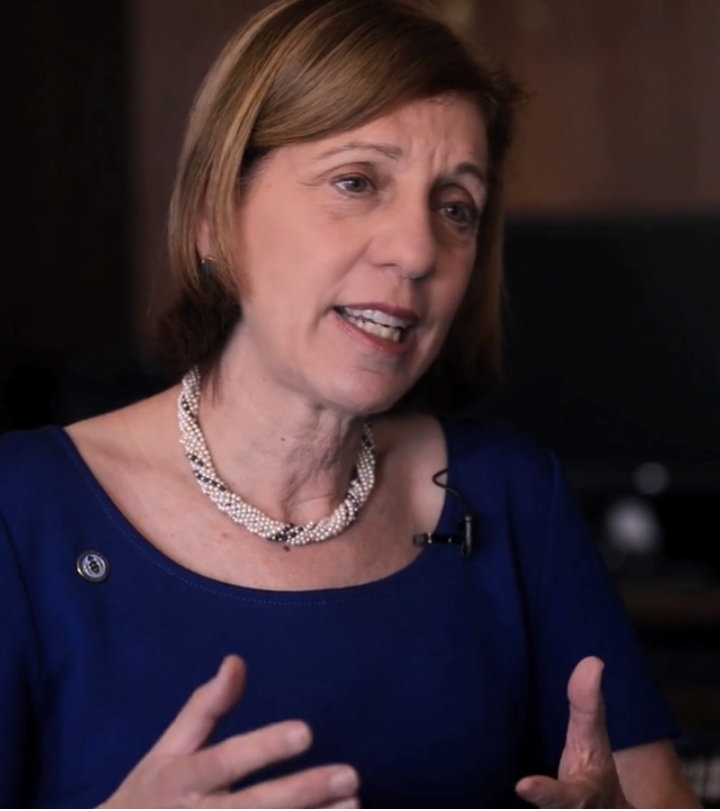

President Pro Tempore of the San Diego City Council
- In office 2017 – December 10, 2020
- Mayor: Kevin Faulconer
- Council President: Myrtle Cole; Georgette Gómez
- Succeeded by: Stephen Whitburn

Member of the San Diego City Council from the 1st district
- In office December 12, 2016 – December 10, 2020
- Mayor: Kevin Faulconer
- Preceded by: Sherri Lightner
- Succeeded by: Joe LaCava

Personal details
- Born: April 9, 1949 (age 77) Philadelphia, Pennsylvania, U.S.
- Party: Democratic
- Spouse: Neil Senturia
- Children: 2
- Education: University of Pennsylvania (BS, MEd); Harvard Business School (MBA)
- Website: Official website

Barbara Bry (Note: Pronounced /bri/, like brie.) (born April 9, 1949) is an American businesswoman and politician who served as a member of the San Diego City Council from 2016 to 2020, representing District 1. A member of the Democratic Party, she served as president pro tempore of the city council from 2017 to 2020 and was a candidate for mayor of San Diego in the 2020 election.

== Early life and education ==
Bry was born and raised in Philadelphia, Pennsylvania. She attended the University of Pennsylvania, where she obtained a bachelor's degree in sociology and a Master of Education. She later attended Harvard Business School, where she earned a Master of Business Administration degree.

== Career ==
Prior to running for elected office, Bry worked at Connect, a venture capital group. She later became an entrepreneur and served on the initial management team of ProFlowers.

In 1998, Bry founded Athena San Diego, an organization for women in the tech and life sciences community. In 2008, Bry founded Run Women Run, an organization that recruits and trains pro-choice women seeking elected and appointed office.

=== San Diego City Council ===
In 2016, Bry ran for the District 1 seat on the San Diego City Council vacated by term-limited incumbent Sherri Lightner. Bry and Republican Ray Ellis advanced from the March primary with 48% and 34% of the vote, respectively. However, on August 12, 2016, Ellis withdrew from the race, although his name still appeared on the November ballot. Bry went on to win the general election with 65% of the vote.

After assuming office in December 2016, Bry served as president pro tempore of the San Diego City Council from 2017 to 2020 under council presidents Myrtle Cole and Georgette Gómez. During her tenure on the city council, she supported restrictions on short term vacation rentals and dockless bicycles, while supporting efforts to combat the gender wage gap in San Diego.

=== 2020 mayoral campaign ===
Bry ran for mayor of San Diego in 2020, seeking to succeed term-limited incumbent Kevin Faulconer. Bry and fellow Democrat, California State Assemblymember Todd Gloria advanced from the March primary with 22.9% and 41.5% of the vote, respectively. During the campaign, Bry received pushback from local Democratic Party leaders for mailers seen as critical of the YIMBY housing movement. Gloria went on to defeat Bry in the November general election with 55.95% of the vote.

After leaving office in December 2020, Bry returned to the private sector to work for a venture capital and private equity firm.

== Personal life ==
Bry lives in San Diego, California with her husband, entrepreneur Neil Senturia. They have two daughters and are grandparents. Bry and her husband are of the Jewish faith.

== Electoral history ==
=== 2016 San Diego City Council ===
2016 San Diego City Council, District 1
Primary election
Candidate	Votes	%
Barbara Bry	18,559	48%
Ray Ellis	12,982	34%
Bruce D. Lightner	3,711	10%
Kyle Heiskala	2,344	6%
Louis A. Rodolico	707	2%
Total votes	38,303	100%
General election
Barbara Bry	38,470	65%
Ray Ellis	20,305	35%
Total votes	58,775	100%

=== 2020 Mayor of San Diego ===
2020 San Diego mayoral election
Primary election
Candidate	Votes	%
Todd Gloria	147,654	41.5%
Barbara Bry	81,541	22.9%
Scott Sherman	80,352	22.6%
Tasha Williamson	25,629	7.2%
Gita Applebaum Singh	12,716	3.6%
Rich Riel	8,067	2.3%
Jarvis Gandy (Write-in candidate)	3	0.0%
Total votes	355,994	100%
General election
Todd Gloria	346,662	55.95%
Barbara Bry	272,887	44.05%
Total votes	619,549	100%
