= Mark Kersey =

American politician (born 1976)

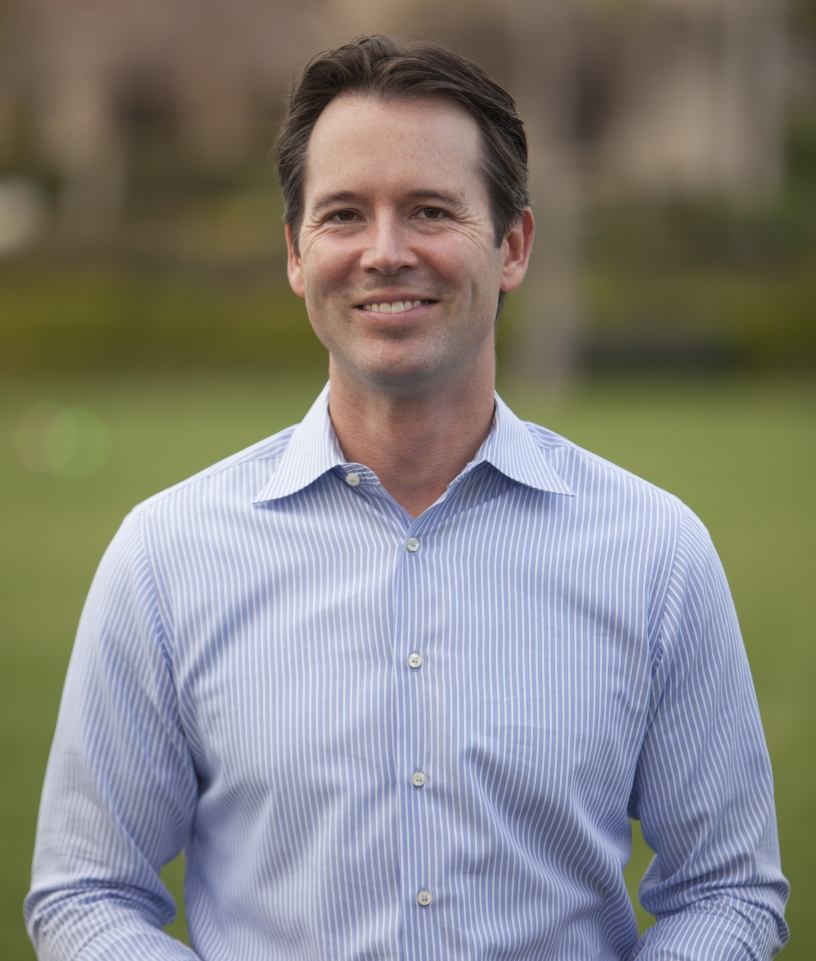

Member of the San Diego City Council for the 5th district
- In office December 2012 – December 10, 2020
- Preceded by: Carl DeMaio
- Succeeded by: Marni von Wilpert

Personal details
- Born: c. 1976 (age 49–50) Columbus, Ohio, U.S.
- Party: Republican (until 2019); Independent (2019–present)
- Education: Northwestern University (BA)
- Website: City Council District 5 website

Mark Kersey (born c. 1976) is an American politician who was a member of the San Diego City Council for District 5 from 2012 to 2020. He was elected in June 2012 and re-elected in June 2016. Kersey was council president in 2016 and 2017. Initially a registered Republican, Kersey left the party in 2019 and became an independent.

== Early life and education ==
Kersey is a native of Columbus, Ohio, and moved to the San Diego area in 2001. He received a Bachelor of Arts degree in history from Northwestern University and took courses in entrepreneurship and management at the UCLA Anderson School of Management.

== Career ==
Before his career in politics, Kersey worked as a telecommunications analyst and formerly maintained his own consulting firm.

=== 2004 Solana Beach city council election ===
Kersey unsuccessfully ran for the Solana Beach City Council in 2004. His candidacy was supported by the Beach and Bluff Conservancy, a local homeowners' group that supported building seawalls to protect their property. Their political action committee spent $18,800 in his behalf during his unsuccessful effort to win a seat on the Solana Beach City Council. In 2008, he was the president of San Diego Young Republicans and was elected to the San Diego County Republican Central Committee.

=== San Diego City Council ===
In 2011, Kersey announced that he would run for San Diego City Council in the 2012 election. He was part of a co-ordinated three-person slate supported by the local Republican Party in an attempt to gain a Republican majority on the nine-member board. He ran unopposed for the District 5 seat being vacated by the retiring councilmember Carl DeMaio. District 5 includes the neighborhoods of Black Mountain Ranch, Carmel Mountain Ranch, Rancho Bernardo, Rancho Encantada, Rancho Peñasquitos, Sabre Springs, San Pasqual Valley, Scripps Ranch and Torrey Highlands. He was elected in the June primary by receiving more than 50% of the vote.

Kersey took office on December 3, 2012. He chairs the Infrastructure Committee, is vice chair of the Economic Development and Intergovernmental Relations Committee, and is a member of the Budget and Finance Committee and Charter Reform Committee. Kersey is also the city's representative to the California League of Cities. He has been called San Diego's "open data and infrastructure guy".

Kersey was elected to a second term in June 2016. In December 2016, he was appointed council president pro tem. He held in this position until December 2017, when he was succeeded by Barbara Bry.

In April 2019, Kersey declared that he was leaving the Republican Party to become an independent, stating that he would work toward bipartisan solutions to the city's issues during the remaining two years of his term.

Kersey was unable to seek re-election to the city council in 2020 due to term limits. He left office on December 10, 2020, and was succeeded by Marni von Wilpert.

==== Infrastructure ====
Kersey was chosen to chair a newly formed infrastructure committee to address the city's backlog of needed repairs which had built up over decades.

As chair of the committee, he spearheaded a plan to address the City of San Diego's approximately $2 billion backlog of infrastructure projects. The plan called for assessments of city infrastructure, streamlining of processes, gathering of neighborhood input and the creation of a long-term infrastructure investment plan.

With Kersey's leadership, the city completed its first-ever comprehensive sidewalk assessment as well as its first multi-year capital plan, which identified $1.7 billion in unfunded infrastructure projects over the next five years.

Kersey also sponsored an ordinance to create a neighborhood input policy which was approved in July 2013. The policy formalized community input as part of the infrastructure prioritization process.

Kersey authored Proposition H in 2016 devoting over a billion dollars in future sales tax growth and pension savings towards repairing the city's infrastructure without raising taxes. Named "Rebuild SD", San Diego voters passed the measure with 64% of the vote. During his tenure, the city's investment in infrastructure increased by hundreds of millions of dollars annually, resulting in half of the city's entire 3,600-mile street network being repaved by the end of December 2020. Additionally, ten city fire stations were built or rebuilt during this time.

==== Open data ====
Kersey supported an open data initiative to "increase accountability and spur innovation" by putting the city's data online for the public. He co-authored a draft open data policy and voted to create an ad hoc committee to review and develop a formal policy to be adopted by the City of San Diego. The final policy was approved by the Council on December 16, 2014.

He also proposed creating a centralized communications point for San Diego City services, known as a 3-1-1 system. Kersey said that 3-1-1 would be a number that people could call if they have potholes on their street, broken traffic lights or spot water leaks in the city.

==== Other work ====
In September 2013, he sponsored an ordinance to streamline the permit process, meant to help reduce costs and the time associated with completing city construction projects.

In 2018, Kersey sponsored Measure L, which amended the City Charter regarding ethics and compensation for elected city officers. The measure proposed restricting benefits for elected city officers, restricting lobbying and campaign activities of elected city officers and removed the requirement that councilmembers set their salaries and those of the mayor and city attorney, providing instead that their salaries be set as percentages of the salary set by the State of California for Superior Court judges. The measure also banned council members or the mayor from lobbying the city for two years after leaving office, outlawed city-paid mailers during election campaigns and did away with free use of the city's luxury boxes at Petco Park or at the city's Mission Valley stadium. The measure passed overwhelmingly, winning 77 percent approval from almost 250,000 voters.

==== Committee assignments ====
- Active Transportation and Infrastructure Committee (chair)
- Economic Development and Intergovernmental Relations Committee
- Rules Committee

==== SDCRAA Board ====
Kersey was appointed to the Board of the San Diego County Regional Airport Authority by San Diego Mayor Kevin Faulconer.

=== 2017 State Senate candidacy ===
In December 2017, Kersey formally announced his candidacy for the California State Senate to succeed fellow Republican Joel Anderson, who is barred by term limits from seeking another term. In March 2018, he announced that he was ending his campaign due to family health issues.

== Personal life ==
He lives in Black Mountain Ranch.

== Electoral history ==
San Diego City Council District 5 election, 2016
Primary election
Party	Candidate	Votes	%
Republican	Mark Kersey	23,858	71%
Democratic	Frank Tsimboukakis	6,784	20%
Democratic	Keith Mikas	3,157	9%
Total votes		33,799	100%

San Diego City Council District 5 election, 2012
Primary election
Party	Candidate	Votes	%
Republican	Mark Kersey	24,869	100.00
Total votes		24,869	100
