= San Diego Free Press =

San Diego Free Press was an underground newspaper founded by philosophy students of Herbert Marcuse at the University of California, San Diego, in November 1968, and published under that title biweekly until December 1969, when it became the weekly Street Journal starting with its 29th issue. The paper's contents were a mix of radical politics, alternative lifestyles, and the counterculture, reflecting in part Marcuse's Frankfurt School Marxist/Freudian ideas of cultural transformation.

Founders of the Free Press included Lowell Bergman, later an investigative reporter for 60 Minutes. Members of the staff commune, called The People's Commune, included John Lawrence, Richard Blackburn ("Black Dick"), Herman Rumper, and Larry Gottlieb. The Policy Coordinator, who wrote most of the editorials, was Jan Diepersloot, a graduate student in linguistics. The staff lived communally in a 3-story brick house in Hillcrest, and also had a dilapidated rural retreat in Ramona, where marijuana was sometimes grown.

Both the Free Press and its successor the Street Journal were subjected to arrests by local police, and harassment and spying by the FBI. Break-ins, vandalism, and the fire-bombing of a car owned by the commune were allegedly carried out by paramilitary vigilantes calling themselves the Secret Army Organization (SAO). Police and members of the military Shore Patrol entered the commune and the paper's offices without a warrant, in search of deserters. Street vendors were arrested and the paper's editorial offices were broken into and robbed; in a break-in on Christmas Day 1969, a $4000 typesetting machine was thoroughly wrecked. Subsequent issues were printed from typewritten copy. Several weeks later a fund-raising cocktail party to raise funds for the Street Journal was raided by police, who arrested Diepersloot for selling alcohol without a license.

The paper made powerful enemies in San Diego by running a series of investigative exposés, largely based on rumor, on the corruption of San Diego's richest and most powerful, including tycoon C. Arnholt Smith, publisher James S. Copley, and race track owner John Alessio. The paper's close ties to the Movement for a Democratic Military (MDM) was a source of friction with local military bases. It became impossible for the paper to find a willing printer in San Diego and the staff had to go out of town, to Los Angeles or farther afield, to find printers. Financial shortfalls took their toll, and the Street Journal finally published its last issue toward the end of 1970.

== Revival ==
The title San Diego Free Press was revived as a local leftist alternative paper produced by Indymedia, starting in 2005. Other than the title it had no other ties to the original San Diego Free Press.

On June 4, 2012 a group, associated with the OB Rag, including former contributors to the original San Diego Free Press/Street Journal, started SanDiegoFreePress.org as a website featuring neighborhood news and progressive viewpoints. Stories are published 7 days a week, including a daily (m-f) news summary and weekly columns covering everything from photographic essays to politics.

SanDiegoFreePress.Org is a volunteer organization made up of citizen journalists, progressives and community activists. An editorial board oversees daily operations and sets policy.

== See also ==
- List of underground newspapers of the 1960s counterculture
