= OB Rag =

United States underground newspaper

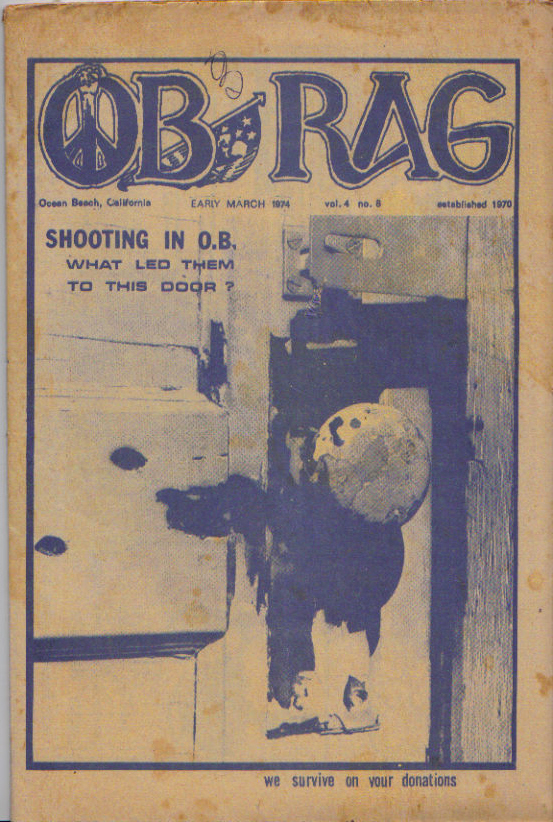
OB Rag - early March 1974 - Vol 4 No 8

The OB Rag (originally the OB People's Rag) was an underground newspaper published between 1970 and 1975 in the neighborhood of Ocean Beach, San Diego, California. The O in the title is also a peace symbol. Other San Diego underground newspapers that dealt with similar issues include San Diego Free Press and The San Diego Door.

The original staff was a small collection of activists who lived in a collective house on Etiwanda St in northeast Ocean Beach. Most of the original group were recent graduates of the University of California and veterans of the anti-war movement expressing Vietnam War opposition. The collective published Volume 1 Number 1 in September 1970. A major early issue for the OB Rag was the fight to save Collier Park on land that had been donated to the city by David Charles Collier. A riot in Collier Park on March 28, 1971, was covered in detail by the Rag.

Beginning in 1972 OB Rag staff and local radical worked from 'The Red House' on 5113 Cape May. The house was the target of paramilitary vigilantes calling themselves the Secret Army Organization (SAO) who allegedly fired shots into the house. The OB Rag was subjected to arrests by local police, and harassment and spying by the FBI. Shots were fired into an activist house at 2014 1/2 Abbott St in Ocean Beach, by the San Diego Police.

== Revival ==
The OB Rag was revived twenty-six years later with paper editions published in Ocean Beach between 2001 and 2003 by members of the Ocean Beach Grassroots Organization (OBGO). The OB Rag has been online at OBRag.org since 2007. In June 2011 members of the OB Rag helped relaunch San Diego Free Press as an online publication.

== See also ==
- List of underground newspapers of the 1960s counterculture
