= San Diego Climate Action Plan =

Climate impact reduction blueprint for San Diego, California

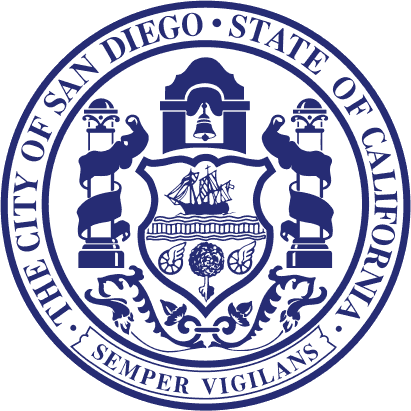
Seal of San Diego, California

The San Diego Climate Action Plan was adopted by the City of San Diego in December 2015. It is a local climate action plan whose rules are defined by the Global Warming Solutions Act of 2006 (AB 32), with the goal of reducing greenhouse gas emissions. Through this plan, the city initially set goals of eliminating half of all greenhouse emissions and sourcing all energy from renewable sources by the year 2035. With a coalition of business owners, environmental advocates, and community leaders, Mayor Kevin Faulconer approved the Climate Action Plan. The plan consists of several policies to ensure the economic and environmental growth of the city of San Diego. It was referred to in The San Diego Union-Tribune as "the most aggressive climate action plan in California."

== Strategies ==
The plan identifies five specific sectors:

1. Efficient building usage of water and energy
2. Renewable sources of energy
3. Transportation and land allocation
4. Waste elimination
5. Adaptation to climate stresses

Transportation was considered the largest sector of concern due to its overall contribution to greenhouse emissions and due to widespread reliance on high-emissions transportation methods. To ensure progress of the plan, there are three phases of the Climate Action Plan: Phase 1: Early Action 2016-2017, Phase 2: Mid-Term 2018-2020, and Phase 3: Long-Term 2021-2035. Several departments within the local government and community will be involved to achieve the desire goal of a better future. A Climate Action Campaign has begun in response to this plan with the help of organizations such as the Sierra Club. Yearly reports are to be made to track progression of this plan. Much of the proposed transition to renewable energy relies on switching from SDG&E to a new community choice energy provider called San Diego Community Power.

The five sectors identified by the city have been further divided into six specific strategies, each with individual targets. Strategy 1, Decarbonization of the Built Environment, focuses on transforming city infrastructure to utilize cleaner energy sources. San Diego Community Power has been tasked with supplying clean energy for new buildings as part of this decarbonization effort. Strategy 2, Access to Clean and Renewable Energy, aims to provide alternative energy sources to reduce dependence on fossil fuels. In effort to achieve this the city of San Diego has taken part in establishing a Joint Powers Authority with the cities of Chula Vista, Encinitas, Imperial Beach, and La Mesa to create an ordinance for a community choice authority on renewable energy. Strategy 3, Mobility and Land Use, focuses on urban planning that prioritizes reliable and energy efficient transportation. This includes the development of a Mobility Action Plan that aims to reduce cost, improves efficiency, and integrate climate resiliency into transportation infrastructure. Strategy 4, Circular Economy and Clean Communities, is targeted towards waste reduction. Progress towards this goal thus far has been linked to the City Recycling Ordinance which mandates recycling of eligible materials. Strategy 5, Resilient Infrastructure and Healthy Ecosystems, involves integrating city infrastructure with the natural environment to adapt the city to be more resilient against natural disasters. Efforts have been concentrated on developing an urban forest in Balboa Park. Strategy 6, Emerging Climate Action, concentrates on the role of community partnerships to implement and monitor the previous five strategies.

== Goals ==
Goals focused on emissions reductions (measured in MT $\ce{CO2}$e, or metric tons of carbon dioxide equivalent) through 2035. The baseline used for the action plan was based on a 2010 report in which the total emissions were 12,984,993 MT of $\ce{CO2}$e. The projected emissions, if no changes were implemented, for the year 2020 is 14,124,690 MT of $\ce{CO2}$e, the year 2030 projection is 15,856,604 MT of $\ce{CO2}$e, and the year 2035 projection is 16,716,020 MT of $\ce{CO2}$e. The climate action plan for the city of San Diego estimated reductions to 11,037, 244 MT of $\ce{CO2}$e by the year 2020, 7,790,996 MT of $\ce{CO2}$e by the year 2039, and 6,492,497 of MT of $\ce{CO2}$e by the year 2035. Additionally, green job creation is one of the goals outlined in the action plan specifically for creating jobs in innovation and continuing the "green initiative" for the city. San Diego leaders emphasized job creation as the city was number seven on the 2017 U.S Clean Tech Leadership Index. In the draft 2021 version of the plan, city leaders proposed changing the 2035 goal to net zero emissions.

== Governance ==
=== Partnerships ===
The San Diego City government has partnered with other local governments and organizations to advocate for decision making consistent with the city's climate action plan. The city's renewable energy strategy is being supported by a county wide zero-carbon plan drafted by the County of San Diego with support from the UC San Diego School of Global Policy and Strategy. Partnering with SANDAG and the San Diego Metropolitan Transit System has been integral to implementing transportation related policy including the 2021 Mid-Coast trolley extension.

== Implementation ==
=== 2018 Report ===
The 2018 San Diego Climate Action annual report outlines the progress of each of the five sectors. For the built environment and transportation sector, the three actions listed in the 2018 Climate action report exceeded the 2020 goal. The irrigation pumps did not produce any data, but the agriculture and conservation sector was seventy trees short of achieving the 14,000 trees planted goal. Water and waste water was able decrease the county's water consumption by 13% and the energy sector installed 38,510 home solar systems on existing houses. This is made possible in part by the Property Assessed Clean Energy (PACE), which allows owners to pay for their solar installation on their property taxes.

2018 Climate Action Report
| Category | Action | MT $\ce{CO2}$e Reduction |
|---|---|---|
| Environment / Transportation | Conservation Land | 4,621 |
| Environment / Transportation | Agricultural Easements | 509 |
| Environment / Transportation | Reduce County Emissions (cars) | 2,796 |
| Agriculture / Conservation | Electric irrigation pumps | 0 |
| Agriculture / Conservation | Plants more trees | 493 |
| Energy | Reduce county energy use | 8,692 |
| Energy | Solar on existing homes | 84,350 |
| Energy | County renewable energy (on-site) | 1,931 |
| Water / Waste Water | Reduce county water consumption | 190 |
| Water / Waste Water | Rain barrel increase | 61 |
| Total Reduction through 2018 | | 103,643 |

=== 2020 ===
The 2020 Climate Action Plan report stated that greenhouse gas emissions had been reduced by 25% compared to 2010, but this claim may be exaggerated because it relies on baseline assumptions that do not take into account reduced vehicle operation after the Great Recession.

Assessing the state of implementation, environmental campaigner Nicole Kapretz said, "There’s been some progress, but it’s not even close to what we need. It’s baby steps when we need leaps."

=== 2021 ===
A 2021 city auditor's report found a lack of cost estimates, poor progress tracking, ambiguous responsibilities, and little communication, with interdepartmental meetings only occurring once a year in 2019 and 2020. While the city agreed to implement recommendations from the auditor, the delay of the release of the mobility action plan was criticized by environmental groups.

In November 2021, an extension of the San Diego Trolley Blue Line was opened, potentially decreasing reliance on cars.

=== 2022 ===
As of 2022, the city had failed to meet its waste diversion target of 75% by 2020 and had remained around a 65% diversion rate since 2017. The percentage of commuters not relying on cars has remained around 15%, and is projected to remain under 30% by 2035, well short of the city's goal of 50%. A 2022 study by Todd Gloria's office found that the city's renewable energy projects could create about 60 to 90 new jobs annually from 2022 to 2035 but that eliminating gas infrastructure would lead to 60 to 65 fewer jobs per year.
