= Sherri Lightner =

American politician (born 1950)

Sherri S. Lightner
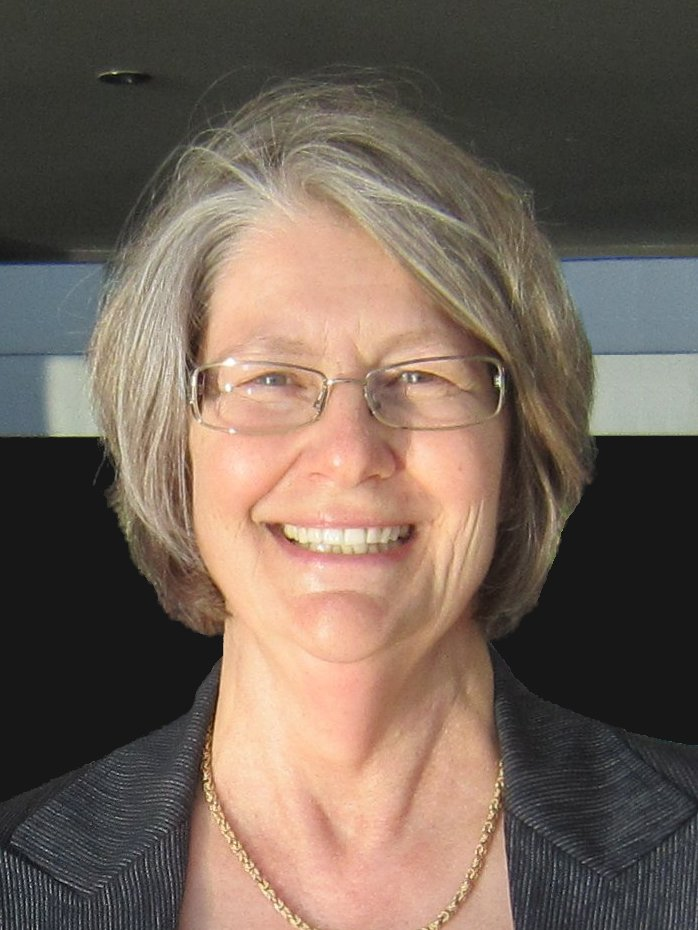
- Sherri Lightner's 2012 Ballot Photo

President of the San Diego City Council
- In office December 10, 2014 – December 12, 2016
- Preceded by: Todd Gloria
- Succeeded by: Myrtle Cole

Member of San Diego City Council from the 1st district
- In office December 2008 – December 12, 2016
- Preceded by: Scott Peters
- Succeeded by: Barbara Bry

Personal details
- Born: Sherri Ann Schuler; 1950 (age 75–76) Pennsylvania, U.S.
- Party: Democratic
- Spouse: Bruce D. Lightner
- Education: University of California, San Diego (BA, MS)
- Website: sherrilightner.org

Sherri Ann Lightner (née Schuler; born 1950) is an American politician, businesswoman, engineer, and community activist who served as a member of the San Diego City Council for District 1, from November 2008 to 2017. She is a Democrat, although council positions are officially nonpartisan.

== Early life and education ==
Lightner was born in western Pennsylvania in 1950 as Sherri Ann Schuler. She moved to San Diego during elementary school and graduated from Crawford High School. Lightner earned a B.A. in mathematics and sociology and her M.S. in applied mechanics and engineering from the University of California, San Diego.

== Career ==
Lightner is licensed by the State of California as a professional mechanical engineer.

Lightner worked in private industry as an engineer for 23 years. She started her professional career as an engineering aide at General Atomics, hired by the High Temperature Gas Cooled Reactor Division. After earning her master's degree, she worked as an engineer in the Structural Engineering Department at General Atomics for eight years, and the company's Fusion Division for another five years. She then accepted a senior engineering position with the Structural Dynamics group at Rohr Industries to work on high velocity (ballistic) impact analysis. After five years at Rohr, Lightner returned to General Atomics to work on the New Production Reactor.

After another five years at General Atomics, Lightner retired from engineering and formed a small technology hardware and software consulting firm with her husband. Lightner also began serving as a volunteer for several San Diego nonprofit organizations. She was the president of the La Jolla Town Council and La Jolla Shores Association and secretary for the La Jolla Community Planning Association.

=== San Diego City Council ===
Lightner was one of three candidates to represent San Diego City Council District 1 in the 2008 election. Lightner led the pack in the June primary, gaining 36.5 percent of the vote compared to Phil Thalheimer's 33.8 percent and Marshall Merrifield's 29.5 percent. Since no candidate got a majority of the votes, Lightner and Thalheimer were forced into a runoff election. During the primaries, the three candidates spent just over $1 million, a record for City Council elections: between December 31, 2007, and June 30, 2008, Lightner spent $115,298, Thalheimer spent $359,678, and Merrifield spent $653,628. These amounts do not include any independent expenditure or "member communication" money from the Republican and Democratic parties.

Lightner won the San Diego City Council general election in November with 51.9 percent of the vote, compared to Thalheimer's 48.1 percent. Lightner replaced termed-out San Diego City councilmember Scott Peters on December 8, 2008. Lightner was elected to a four-year term.

Lightner is chair of the Rules and Economic Development Committee and Land Use and Housing Committee. She also serves on the Land Use and Housing Committee and the Budget and Finance Committee.

She was re-elected in the 2012 election, defeating Republican Ray Ellis Lightner competed in a November runoff, defeating, Ellis 55% to 45%.

As council president pro tem from August 30, 2013, to March 3, 2014, Lightner performed the duties of the council president while Council President Todd Gloria served as interim mayor.

On December 10, 2014, Lightner was voted to be City Council President, replacing Todd Gloria. In 2016, she retired from the City Council due to term limits.

== Personal life ==
She and her husband live in La Jolla Shores.
