= Todd Gloria =

Mayor of San Diego since 2020

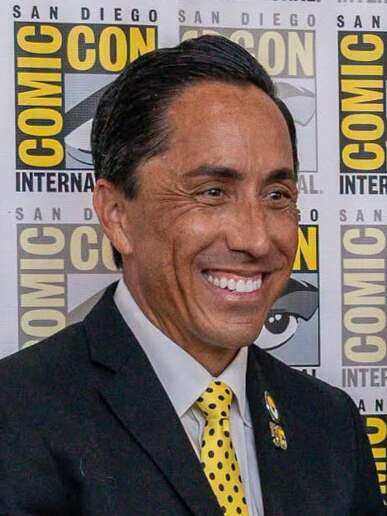
- Gloria in 2026

37th Mayor of San Diego
- Incumbent
- Assumed office December 10, 2020
- Preceded by: Kevin Faulconer
- In office August 30, 2013 – March 3, 2014; Acting
- Preceded by: Bob Filner
- Succeeded by: Kevin Faulconer

84th President of the United States Conference of Mayors
- Incumbent
- Assumed office June 7, 2026
- Preceded by: David Holt

Member of the California State Assembly from the 78th district
- In office December 5, 2016 – November 30, 2020
- Preceded by: Toni Atkins
- Succeeded by: Chris Ward

President of the San Diego City Council
- In office December 3, 2012 – December 10, 2014
- Preceded by: Tony Young
- Succeeded by: Sherri Lightner

Member of the San Diego City Council from the 3rd district
- In office December 8, 2008 – December 5, 2016
- Preceded by: Toni Atkins
- Succeeded by: Chris Ward

Personal details
- Born: Todd Rex Gloria; May 10, 1978 (age 48) San Diego, California, U.S.
- Party: Democratic
- Education: University of San Diego (BA)

Todd Rex Gloria (born May 10, 1978) is an American politician serving as the 37th mayor of San Diego since 2020.

Gloria was first elected to public office representing District 3 of the San Diego City Council. He was president of the nine-member council from 2012 through 2014. As council president, Gloria served as interim mayor of San Diego following the August 2013 resignation of Mayor Bob Filner until the March 2014 inauguration of Mayor Kevin Faulconer.

In 2016, Gloria was elected to represent California's 78th State Assembly district, which encompasses much of San Diego. While in the state assembly, he served as majority whip.

Gloria ran for and was elected mayor of San Diego in 2020. A member of the Democratic Party, he is the first person of color (Note: Tlingit-Haida, Puerto Rican and Filipino) and the first openly gay person to serve as San Diego's mayor.

In 2026, he became president of the United States Conference of Mayors.

== Early life ==
Gloria and his family grew up in the Clairemont neighborhood of San Diego, where he attended Hawthorne Elementary School. In 1989, he was a finalist in then-San Diego mayor Maureen O'Connor's "Mayor for a Day" program. Gloria then attended James Madison High School in 1992 and held leadership positions such as Battalion Commander and Brigade Commander for Madison High School and the SDUSD JROTC Brigade. His father was a Production Controller at General Atomics. All four of his grandparents moved to the area because of their involvement with the military. Todd Gloria comes from a Filipino, Dutch, Puerto Rican, and Native American background. He is a Tlingit descendant and is a tribal member of the Tlingit & Haida Indian Tribes of Alaska. Gloria graduated from the University of San Diego where he was the student body president.

== Career ==
U.S. congresswoman Susan Davis had been Gloria's political mentor since they met in 1993 when Gloria was a freshman in high school. Davis was the director of the Aaron Price Fellows Program, a leadership program for high school students focused on civic education and cross-cultural understanding. He began his career at the County of San Diego’s Health and Human Services Agency and joined the office of Susan Davis as a community representative. In 2002, Gloria became Davis's district director, a position he held until his election to the City Council in 2008. Gloria also served as a San Diego Housing Commissioner from 2005 until 2008. Openly gay, he is also a former chairman of the San Diego LGBT Community Center and was a resident panelist on San Diego's Prostitution Impact Panel.

In 2012, he was elected as the President of the City Council. A year later, after Bob Filner resigned from office, he took office as the interim mayor. During this time, he gained popularity and trust from his community by improving the layout of a revolutionary plan for the city’s fight against climate change, strengthening the infrastructure and offered creative resolutions to the severe homelessness of San Diego. Upon his success, he was then elected as a representative of the 78th District of the California State Assembly and rose to the position of Majority Whip. He established legislation addressing issues in San Diego, such as housing and homelessness, gun violence, and global warming. He was the vice chair of the California Legislative LGBT Caucus.

=== San Diego City Council ===
==== Elections ====
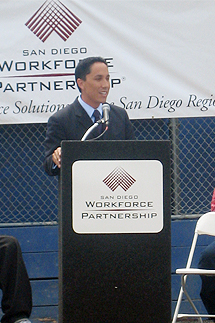
Council Member Todd Gloria speaking to the San Diego Workforce Partnership.

Gloria ran for the District 3 seat on the San Diego City Council vacated by the termed-out Toni Atkins in the 2008 election. He received a plurality of votes in the June 2008 primary, leading to a November run-off election against fellow Democrat Stephen Whitburn, a former journalist, community activist, and ally of then-District 6 Councilmember Donna Frye. Gloria defeated Whitburn with 54.3% of the vote.

In the 2012 election, Gloria ran for re-election unopposed and was re-elected in the June primary.

==== Tenure ====
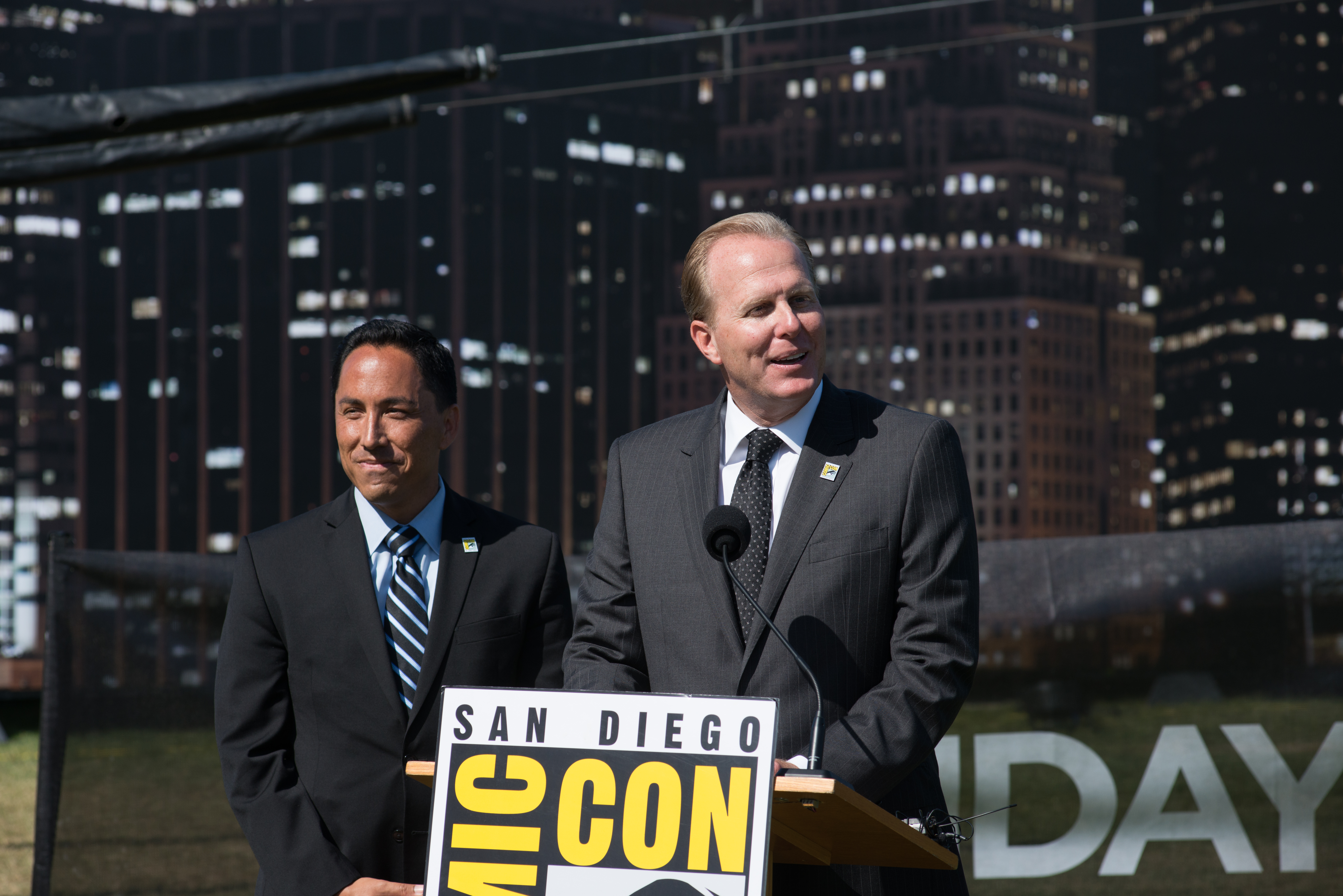
Gloria and then-San Diego mayor Kevin Faulconer at a San Diego Comic-Con event in 2014

Gloria was chair of the city's Budget and Finance Committee from 2011 to 2016. Gloria represented San Diego on the San Diego Metropolitan Transit System Board and SANDAG, where he chaired the transportation committee. As the Council member for District Three, he also took charge in the merger of multiple homelessness organizations in San Diego. By doing so, Gloria aimed to consolidate the city's allocated resources to help end homelessness. In December 2012, at its first meeting after new members took office, Gloria was unanimously elected to serve as Council President, replacing retiring President Tony Young.

On December 10, 2014, the city council voted 4–5 on a motion to reappoint Gloria as council president for the new term, with Sherri Lightner joining the four council Republicans to defeat the measure. The council then voted 7–2 to appoint Lightner as council president, with Gloria and David Alvarez in opposition.

==== Interim Mayor ====
Upon the resignation of Mayor Bob Filner on August 30, 2013, Gloria became the interim mayor of San Diego, with limited powers. His new interim role led to San Diego becoming the second-largest city in the United States, after Houston, with an openly gay mayor. He served until March 3, 2014, when mayor-elect Kevin Faulconer was sworn in. While serving as interim mayor, Gloria remained the City Councilmember for District 3 and retained the title of City Council President; however, City Council President Pro Tem Sherri Lightner carried out the duties of the Council President. Gloria was considered a possible candidate to replace Filner but chose not to run.

As interim mayor, Gloria reversed several of Filner's actions. He ordered city police and zoning code officers to resume enforcement actions against medical marijuana, re-hired lobbying firms in Sacramento and Washington that Filner had fired, and ordered public records be made more quickly and easily available to citizens.

Gloria's administration authored and released a draft of the San Diego Climate Action Plan.

=== California State Assembly ===
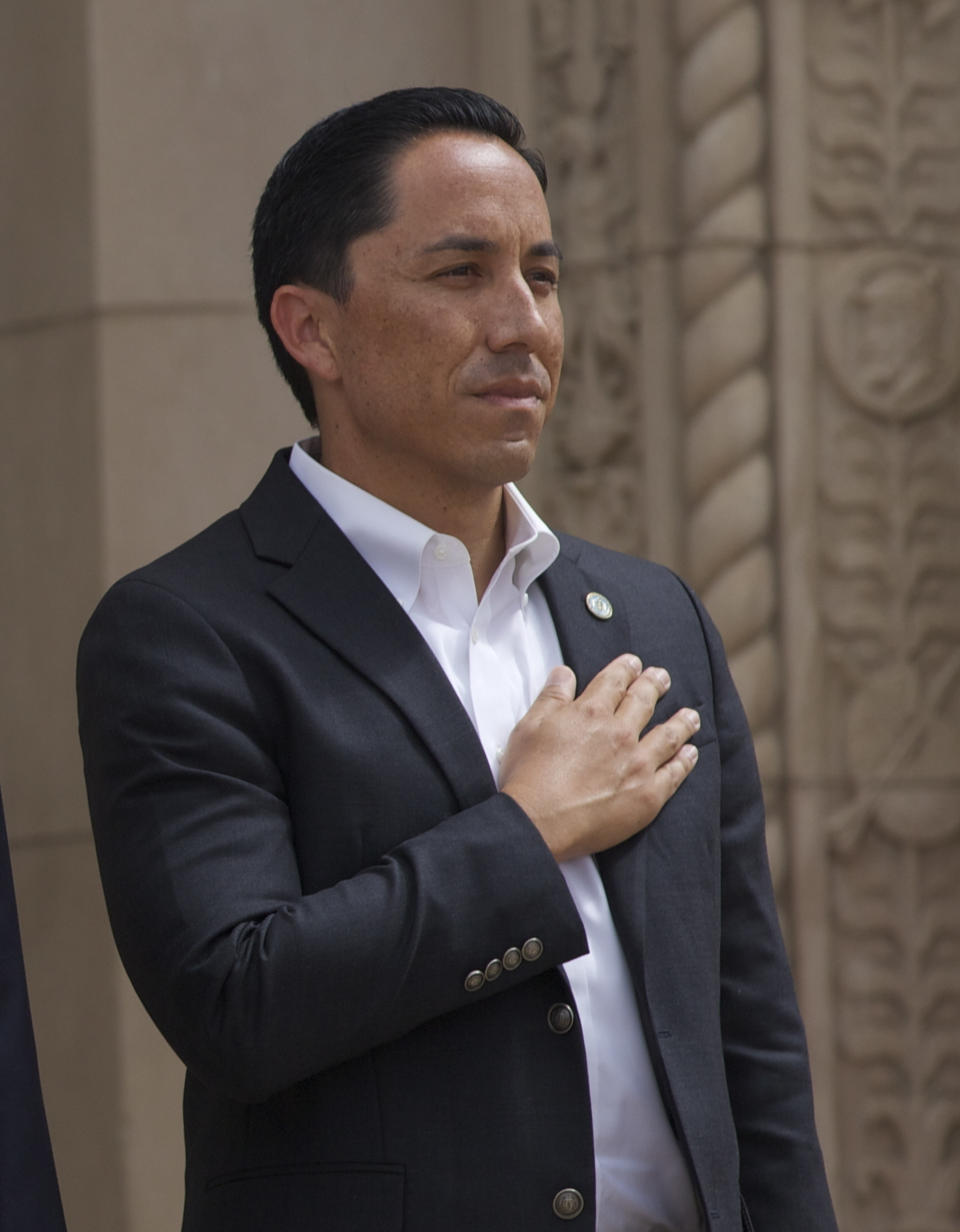
Gloria at Balboa Park's 100th anniversary, 2015.

On April 7, 2015, Gloria announced that he would run in 2016 for the California State Assembly 78th district seat held by Assembly Speaker Toni Atkins, who was termed out. Gloria was immediately endorsed by Atkins and by Sarah Boot, who had previously announced her own candidacy for Atkins's seat but withdrew upon Gloria's announcement. While running for State Assembly, Gloria promoted the city's climate action plan. On November 8, 2016, Gloria was easily elected over his relatively unknown Republican opponent with the second-highest margin of victory in San Diego County. He was easily re-elected in 2018 with over 70 percent of the vote in both the primary and the general elections.

Shortly after assuming office in 2016, Gloria was chosen by Speaker Anthony Rendon to join Democratic leadership in the Assembly as Assistant Majority Whip. In January 2018, he became Majority Whip.

=== Mayor of San Diego ===
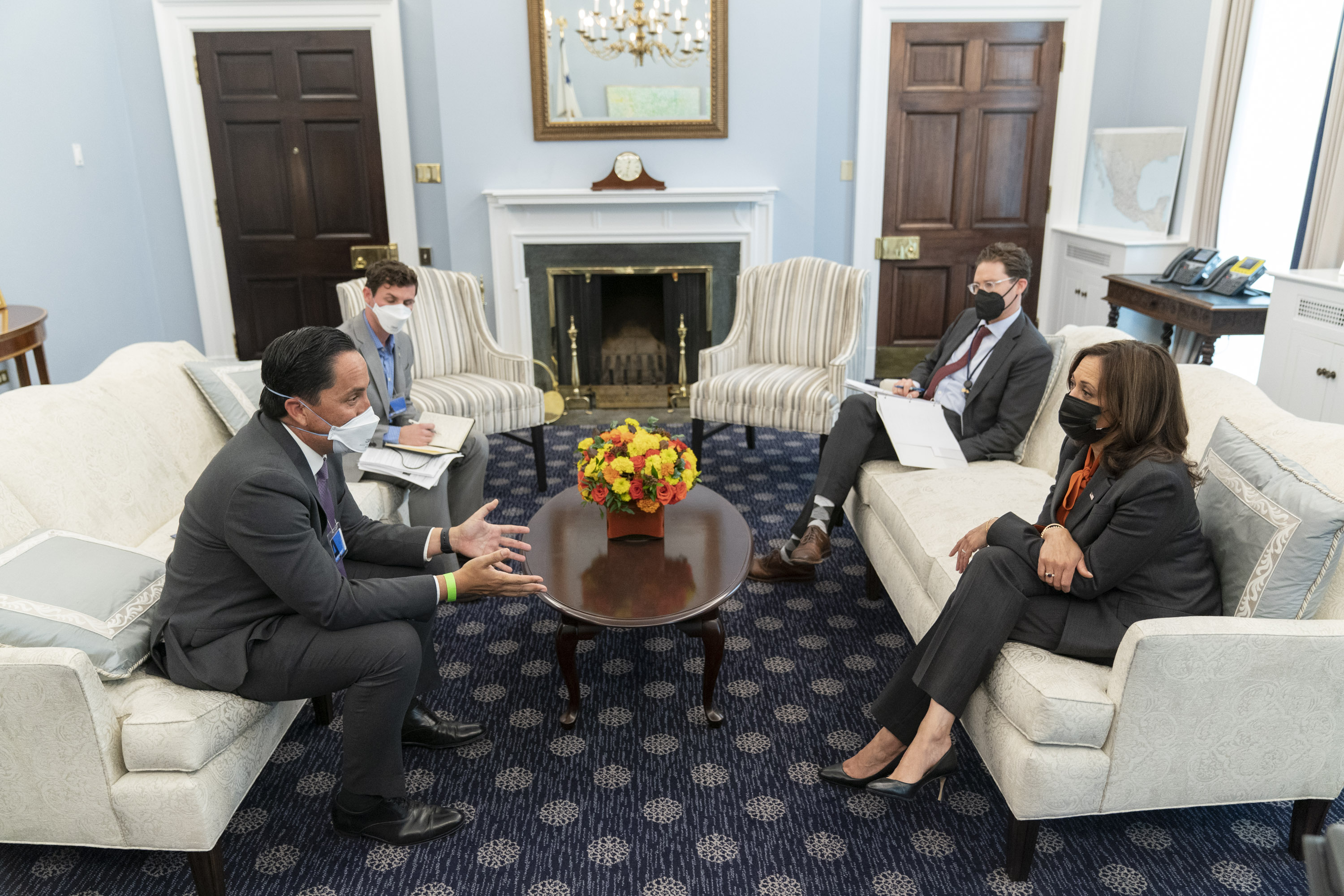
Gloria (front left) meets with Vice President Kamala Harris (front right) in 2021

==== Campaign ====
Gloria announced his candidacy for mayor of San Diego in 2020 on January 9, 2019. Gloria's campaign focused on issues such as the housing crisis, affordability, public transportation, and climate change. Gloria was endorsed by several politicians, including Governor Gavin Newsom, former Governor Jerry Brown, and San Diego City Attorney Mara Elliott.

On August 20, 2019, Gloria won the San Diego County Democratic Party's endorsement vote, allowing the party to spend money on behalf of his campaign. Gloria received 70% of the votes, exceeding the 60% required to win. Fellow Democratic rivals Barbara Bry and Tasha Williamson won 14% and 3% of the votes, respectively.

In August 2019, Gloria was accused of collecting funds for his 2020 re-election campaign to the State Assembly before filing his intent to run with the state, violating state law. Gloria claimed this was a technical oversight and filed the relevant paperwork the next day.

With the Mayor's office being a "voter-nominated" position in San Diego, Gloria and Bry advanced to the general election as the top two vote-getters from the primary. On November 3, he was elected mayor, making history as the first Native American and the first Filipino-American to hold this position in a U.S. city with over a million people. He also became San Diego's first mayor of color and its first openly gay mayor. Gloria was sworn in on December 10, 2020.

==== Tenure ====
===== Infrastructure =====
To revitalize the city's infrastructure, Gloria proposed a budget for Fiscal Year 2023 called the “Ready to Rebuild” proposal. At just under $5 billion total, the budget increased the allocation of funds to street maintenance by $27.6 million, parks and recreation services by $4.3 million, and left $55.8 million from the American Rescue Plan Act money given to the city for the next fiscal year. From the budget initiatives, several projects that support San Diego's Capital Improvements Program (CIP) are underway to repair the city's infrastructure. CIP functions as the plan to improve the capital and infrastructure of San Diego over several years. These projects focus on areas that provide important services for San Diego residents such as fire stations, libraries, and parks.

===== Public safety =====
In 2021, Gloria proposed reforms for policing and public safety in San Diego, many of which were formed in response to the citizens of San Diego. For one of the items, Gloria promised to adequately fund the Commission on Police Practices (CPP), which is an independent organization in charge of overseeing and investigating incidents involving the San Diego Police. There is also a clause in the proposal calling for San Diego police to refrain from using military-grade weapons unless absolutely necessary. However, as of mid-2024, some parts of the reforms have not been implemented. For example, the city has not yet adopted an ordinance to guide the creation of the Commission on Police Practices, and there are still no new training procedures for the city's police officers on unconscious and implicit bias.

===== Homelessness and housing =====
In 2023, San Diego issued more housing permits than it had in decades, nearly doubling the number of permits issued in 2022. The increase in housing supply followed housing reforms that eased housing construction.

As mayor, Gloria repeatedly called homelessness one of his top priorities. While San Diego has added hundreds of beds for the homeless during Gloria's tenure, it has also experienced a record increase in the number of unsheltered people in its downtown area and a record rise in the number of homeless deaths.

During his campaign, Gloria proposed the use of housing with wrap-around services, making emergency shelters only available for triage, and replacing temporary shelters with permanent housing for those in need.

In 2021, Gloria proposed a budget for the fiscal year of roughly $10 million in investments toward homelessness and housing in San Diego, emphasizing “a compassionate, person-centered approach.” The budget allocates funds for creating a new department called Homelessness Strategies and Solutions. A majority of the proposed investments will go to interim shelter beds. The proposal also invests $1 million into funding for the People Assisting the Homeless Coordinated Street Outreach Program. This program uses "a person-centered, neighborhood-based approach" to establish trust with homeless residents and link them to housing and services. Rapid-rehousing programs in the city will also benefit from the proposal's funding of 100 additional households and rental assistance.

In late June 2023, Todd Gloria signed the "Unsafe Camping Ordinance" that was introduced by City Councilmember Stephen Whitburn, following its passage by the San Diego City Council by a 5-4 vote. The law prohibits tent encampments in all public spaces in San Diego if shelter beds are available, and imposes a complete ban on encampments in parks, canyons, near schools, near transit stations, and near homeless shelters. Gloria defended the law, saying that "there has to be consequences for illegal behavior in the city. Now we’re saying you cannot occupy public spaces under certain circumstances", and that the city had expanded its shelter programs. He also stated he wanted to avoid the impression "that it’s easy to be homeless here and you can do drugs in my city". However, a spokesperson for the San Diego Housing Commission said that all of the city's shelters get filled by mid-day, and that most people referred to shelters by police and other authorities did not get placed, reporting that less than one-third of people referred to shelters in June 2023 were placed in one. Some of the city's homeless population reported getting displaced by police when no shelters were available, and one police officer opined that the new law did not help efforts and was "all the same".

Despite those efforts, finding affordable housing in San Diego remains challenging, with nearly 60% of homes in San Diego having a listing price exceeding $1 million in 2023. The city's median home price is $910,000, making it the fourth most expensive among the 30 largest cities in the U.S. The average monthly rent in San Diego has risen to $3,175, placing it as the third-highest in the nation, only $7 less than that of San Francisco.

On April 4, 2024, Gloria announced a tentative 35-year lease agreement to convert a 65,000-square-foot commercial building at Kettner Boulevard and Vine Street in Middletown into the city's largest permanent homeless shelter. To be called Hope @ Vine, the shelter would add 1,000 beds to the city system, and the long lease would ensure that the city has long-term access to the beds. On July 17, 2024, the Mayor announced a tentative agreement between the city and the property owner. The lease would be for 30 years at a rate of $1.95 per square foot, with annual increases of 3.5% and an estimated $12.5 million for facility maintenance over the lease term. However, San Diego's independent budget analyst (IBA) urged caution because, as proposed, the shelter would be above market rate, costing $72 million in rent throughout the 30-year lease. The San Diego City Council still had to review and vote on the negotiated lease at their July 22, 2024, meeting, where they voted 7-2 to continue the discussion until the following week. Gloria, though, postponed the Council meeting until September, stating he would work with the City Attorney's Office to address feedback from the City Council and convene a working group to develop a design and preliminary operation plans.

===== United States Conference of Mayors =====
Gloria joined the advisory board of the United States Conference of Mayors (USCM) in 2021 and became a trustee in 2022. He was elected the organization's second vice president in June 2024, and in June 2025 became vice president under Oklahoma City mayor David Holt. On June 7, 2026, at the USCM's 94th annual meeting in Long Beach, Gloria was installed as the organization's 84th president, succeeding Holt. He is the first mayor of San Diego and the first openly gay person to hold the position. His agenda for the year, titled "Mayors Deliver", focuses on affordable housing, public safety, and lowering costs.

== Personal life ==
Gloria lives in downtown San Diego with his partner, Adam Smith. They have a dog named Diego.

== Electoral history ==
=== San Diego City Council ===
2008 San Diego City Council District 3 election
Primary election
Party	Candidate	Votes	%
Democratic	Todd Gloria	9,288	40.64
Democratic	Stephen Whitburn	6,543	28.63
Democratic	John Hartley	4,018	17.58
Nonpartisan	Paul Broadway	1,428	6.25
Nonpartisan	Robert E. Lee	840	3.68
Nonpartisan	James Hartline	739	3.23
Total votes		22,856	100%
General election
Democratic	Todd Gloria	27,922	54.60
Democratic	Stephen Whitburn	23,191	45.40
Total votes		51,398	100%

2012 San Diego City Council District 3 election
Party	Candidate	Votes	%
Democratic	Todd Gloria	24,475	100.00
Total votes		24,475	100

=== California State Assembly ===
2016 California's 78th State Assembly district election
Primary election
Party	Candidate	Votes	%
Democratic	Todd Gloria	91,602	71.8
Republican	Kevin D. Melton	36,013	28.2
Total votes		127,615	100.0
General election
Democratic	Todd Gloria	122,828	68.9
Republican	Kevin D. Melton	55,414	31.1
Total votes		178,242	100.0

2018 California's 78th State Assembly district election
Primary election
Party	Candidate	Votes	%
Democratic	Todd Gloria (incumbent)	79,738	71.2
Republican	Maggie J. Campbell	32,250	28.8
Total votes		111,988	100.0
General election
Democratic	Todd Gloria (incumbent)	140,598	71.1
Republican	Maggie J. Campbell	57,217	28.9
Total votes		197,815	100.0
Democratic hold			

=== Mayor of San Diego ===
2020 San Diego mayoral election
Primary election
Party	Candidate	Votes	%
Democratic	Todd Gloria	147,654	41.5%
Democratic	Barbara Bry	81,541	22.9%
Republican	Scott Sherman	80,352	22.6%
Democratic	Tasha Williamson	25,629	7.2%
Democratic	Gita Applebaum Singh	12,716	3.6%
Other	Rich Riel	8,067	2.3%
Write-In	Jarvis Gandy	3	0.0%
Total votes		355,994	100%
General election
Democratic	Todd Gloria	346,662	55.9%
Democratic	Barbara Bry	272,887	45.1%
Total votes		619,549	100%

2024 San Diego mayoral election
Primary election
Party	Candidate	Votes	%
Democratic	Todd Gloria	132,055	49.99%
Independent	Larry Turner	60,931	23.07%
Democratic	Geneviéve Jones-Wright	42,196	15.97%
Republican	Jane Glasson	18,990	7.19%
Independent	Dan Smiechowski	9,973	3.78%
Total votes		264,145	100%
General election
Democratic	Todd Gloria	317,015	55.35%
Independent	Larry Turner	255,782	44.65%
Total votes		572,797	100%

== Notes ==
Political offices
Preceded by Bob Filner	Mayor of San Diego; Acting; 2013–2014	Succeeded by Kevin Faulconer
Preceded by Kevin Faulconer	Mayor of San Diego; 2020–present	Incumbent
