= Carl DeMaio =

American politician (born 1974)

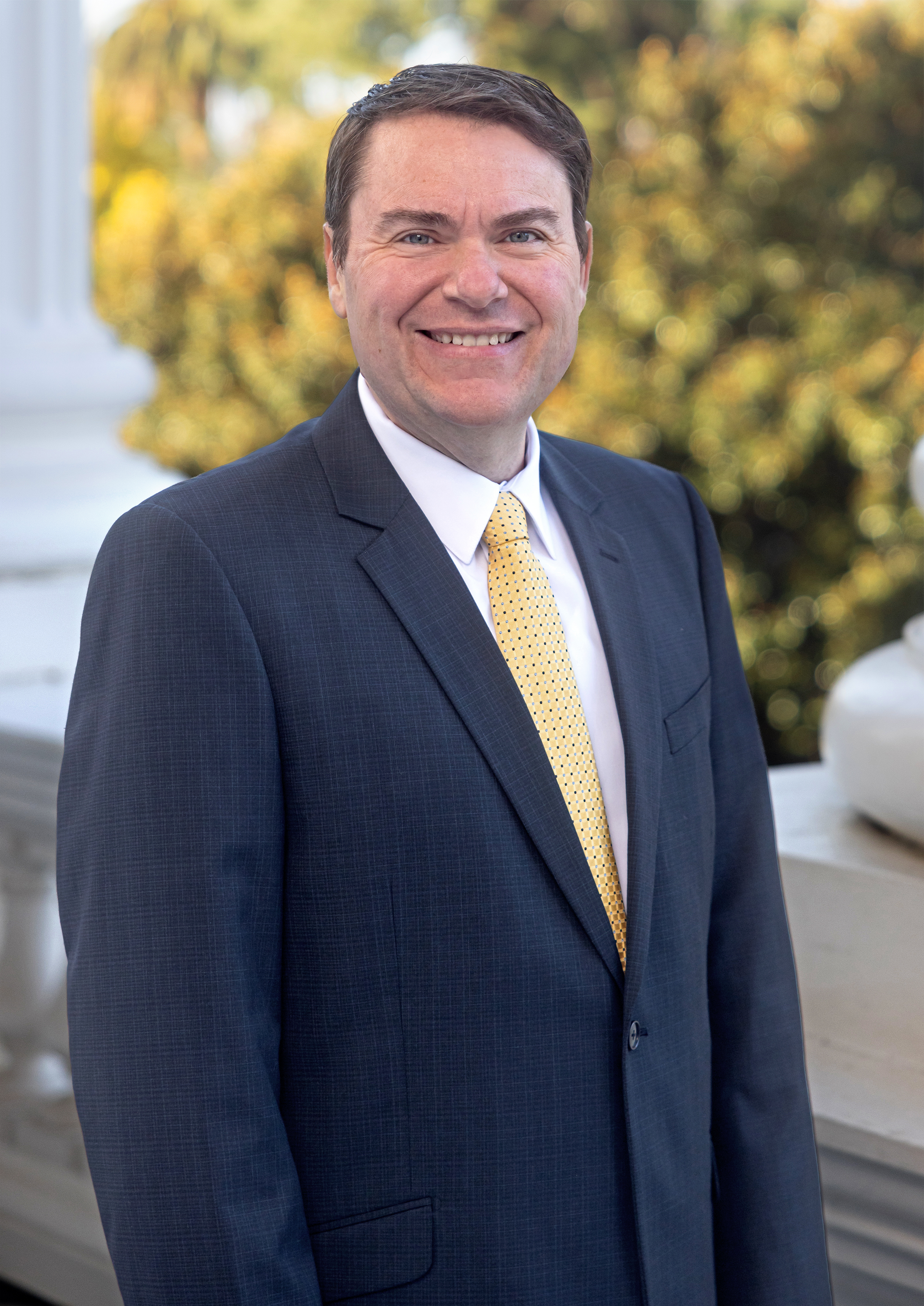
- Official portrait, 2024

Member of the California State Assembly from the 75th district
- Incumbent
- Assumed office December 2, 2024
- Preceded by: Marie Waldron

Member of the San Diego City Council from the 5th district
- In office December 2008 – December 2012
- Preceded by: Brian Maienschein
- Succeeded by: Mark Kersey

Personal details
- Born: Carl David DeMaio; September 14, 1974 (age 52) Dubuque, Iowa, U.S.
- Party: Republican
- Spouse: Jonathan Hale (m. 2015)
- Education: Georgetown University (BA)
- Website: Official website State Assembly website

Carl David DeMaio (born September 14, 1974) is an American politician from San Diego, California who is serving in the California State Assembly. A member of the Republican Party, DeMaio represents the 75th State Assembly district, encompassing North and East San Diego County. DeMaio is also chairman of Reform California, a conservative political organization, and hosts the podcast "Reform California with Carl DeMaio".

DeMaio served a single term as a member of the San Diego City Council, representing District 5 from 2008 to 2012. He is the first openly gay Republican elected to the California State Legislature.

== Early life and education ==
DeMaio was born in 1974 in Dubuque, Iowa to a pair of teachers, Carl Joseph DeMaio and Diane M. DeMaio (née Elgin). He and his family moved to Orange County, California in the late 1970s. He attended St. Catherine's Military Academy, a Catholic school in Anaheim, through eighth grade. In 1989, he got a scholarship to Georgetown Preparatory School, a Jesuit boarding school in Maryland. His mother died of breast cancer in 1990 when he was 15 years old; his abusive father abandoned the family two weeks prior to her death.

DeMaio became separated from his brother and sister and began attending Georgetown Prep. He graduated in 1993, then attended Georgetown University's School of Foreign Service, where he received a degree in international politics and business in 1996.

== Early career ==
After college, he established The Performance Institute, a for-profit think tank that provided training for government officials on performance measurement, strategic planning, zero-based budgeting, project management and other management improvement topics. In 2003 DeMaio founded a second company, the American Strategic Management Institute, which provided financial and management training to corporations. He sold both companies to the Thompson Publishing Group in late 2007.

=== Government reform advocacy ===
Between 1994 and 1999, DeMaio worked for the Congressional Institute, serving as the Institute's Director of Planning. In this position DeMaio developed training programs and retreats for Members of Congress and their staff on the budget process and ways to conduct oversight investigations of federal programs using the Government Performance and Results Act.

In 2000, DeMaio joined the Reason Foundation to lead a project to develop a bipartisan management improvement plan for the incoming Presidential Administration. C-Span broadcast a series of Townhall hosted by DeMaio that eventually led to a management reform plan that was accepted by incoming President George W. Bush.

DeMaio moved to San Diego in 2002. That year he appeared on behalf of the Reason Foundation in front of the San Diego City Council to present an award to the city for having the most efficient government in California. He later alleged this award was based on "false and misleading" financial data provided to him by the city.

In 2004, DeMaio launched the San Diego Citizens Budget Project that issued a report claiming that San Diego's predicted budget deficit of $27 million was in fact closer to $80–$100 million.[5] The report also advocated for change in San Diego's budget process. Between 2004 and 2012, DeMaio was Chairman of San Diego Citizens for Accountable Government – a 527 political action committee that raised funds to oppose tax increases and sponsor policy research and initiatives to reform government in San Diego county. In 2015, DeMaio launched Reform California – a 527 political action committee that raises funds to oppose tax increases and sponsor policy research and initiatives to reform government throughout California. DeMaio serves as Chairman and principal officer for Reform California. In 2015 DeMaio, warning that unfunded government pension liabilities were growing too large, announced Reform California would partner with former San Jose Mayor Chuck Reed to propose and pass a statewide Pension Reform Initiative.

Josh Newman recall effort

In 2017 DeMaio announced a recall against Democratic state senator Josh Newman citing Newman's vote for the car and gas tax increases. DeMaio led a coalition to collect more than 65,000 signatures to force a recall onto the June 2018 ballot. The recall won with 59% of the vote and Newman was replaced by Ling-Ling Chang. It was the first successful recall of a California state senator in over 104 years.

Gas Tax Repeal Initiative

In 2018 DeMaio led the effort to qualify the Gas Tax Repeal Initiative and his group successfully collected almost 1 million signatures and got the initiative qualified for the November 2018 ballot. The measure, titled Prop 6 on the ballot, lost by a 55-45% vote. While polls showed strong support for the gas tax repeal, DeMaio blamed the loss on what he claimed was a misleading ballot title placed on the initiative by the attorney general that excluded the words gas, tax, and repeal. A 2018 study done by Inewsource showed DeMaio's Reform California has more than 25,000 donors, raised over $2 million that year, and had more than one-third of its donors give $100 or less.

He later proposed a followup ballot measure to the Gas Tax Repeal campaign. His proposal would create a “lockbox” so that gasoline and diesel taxes are spent only on road projects, steer sales taxes from automobile purchases to regional transportation agencies, and enact cost-saving changes to infrastructure planning and construction.

== Radio hosting and podcasts ==
=== KOGO radio host ===
In April 2015, DeMaio joined KOGO Radio (AM-600), first as a co-host with Bob Sullivan of a midday radio show (1-4 pm) with Bob Sullivan, and then starting in November 2015 as a solo host of his own show, "The DeMaio Report," during the afternoon drive (3-6pm).

In addition to offering commentary on news and politics as a traditional radio host, DeMaio has used his radio show platform to promote and advance a number of political causes and campaigns. In January 2018 DeMaio signed a new five-year contract with KOGO. In August 2019, he took a leave of absence to launch his 2020 Congressional race and began airing his own Podcast as a way to stay connected with his followers.

=== Podcasts and leave from radio ===
"The Carl DeMaio Show" ran from 2019 to 2020 as an audio-only show for one to two episodes a week and was available on platforms such as Spotify and Apple Podcasts. DeMaio returned to KOGO after the March 2020 Primary Election.

In January 2023, DeMaio rebooted his podcast as "Reform California with Carl DeMaio" — this time as a videocast with a primary focus on YouTube streaming.

In December 2023, DeMaio again took a leave from his KOGO radio show to launch his 2024 Assembly race, but continued his Podcast as a way to stay connected with his followers.

DeMaio has hosted a number of guests on his podcast over the years, including: California Republican candidates like Steve Hilton, Chad Bianco, Michael Gates, and Gloria Romero; members of organizations like Michael Schwartz from San Diego County Gun Owners, former Chairman of the California College Republicans Dylan Martin, and Erin Friday from Protect Kids CA.

"Reform California with Carl DeMaio" has over 225,000 subscribers on YouTube as of February 2026, earning the show a Youtube Play Button.

== Political career ==
=== San Diego City Council ===
DeMaio ran for the termed-out Brian Maienschein's District 5 San Diego City Council seat in the nonpartisan 2008 election. At the time, District 5 included the neighborhoods of Rancho Bernardo, Carmel Mountain Ranch, Sabre Springs, Mira Mesa, Sorrento Mesa, Scripps Ranch, and San Pasqual Valley.

He won the seat in the June primary election, defeating his opponent, former Solana Beach Fire Chief George K. George, with 66% of the vote. DeMaio was the first openly gay man to be elected to the council, and the first Italian American elected to office in the city of San Diego since the 1930s.

As a council member, DeMaio was vice chair of three committees: the Natural Resources and Culture Committee, the Budget and Finance Committee, and the Audit Committee.

While a member of the City Council, DeMaio released a number of studies and proposals on city employee compensation packages and pension benefits, arguing that salaries and benefits of city employees should be reduced to levels consistent with the local labor market. He opposed a proposal to build a new San Diego central library, saying the city could not afford it.

DeMaio also proposed a Sunshine Act, which passed the City Council with unanimous support. The ordinance imposed new disclosure and transparency reforms on city government.

DeMaio was the primary author of San Diego's June 2012 Proposition B, titled "Amendments to the San Diego City Charter Affecting Retirement Benefits," and he led the drive to put it on the ballot. Proposition B proposed (1) limiting of compensation used to calculate city employee pension benefits; (2) eliminating defined-benefit pensions for many new city employees, substituting a defined-contribution (401(k)-style) plan; (3) requiring substantially equal pension contributions from the City and employees; and (4) eliminating the right of employees/retirees to vote to change their benefits. Proposition B was approved by San Diego voters by a 2-to-1 margin on June 5, 2012.

In 2010, DeMaio supported the addition of a citizen initiative called "Competition and Transparency in City Contracts", which would require the city to seek competitive bids for some services and allow the city to outsource without the involvement of unions. However, the measure was rejected by the county registrar of voters after a random sample concluded that DeMaio had not gathered enough valid signatures. After the ballot measure was rejected, San Diego CityBeat reported that a committee called "Reforming City Hall with Carl DeMaio" had paid $16,000 to Hale Media Inc., a company owned by DeMaio's boyfriend, for signature gathering. When CityBeat contacted Jonathan Hale, he said he hadn't done any paid work for the campaign, but had only volunteered and taken photos. A campaign spokesperson said the money was reimbursement to Hale Media for paying the interns who were collecting signatures.

DeMaio also campaigned against a proposal to boost the city's sales tax by a half-a-billion dollars over five years. He argued instead to reduce the budget deficit through spending cuts and pension reform.

=== 2012 mayoral election ===
In 2011, DeMaio filed papers declaring his intention to run for mayor of San Diego in 2012, when mayor Jerry Sanders would be retiring due to term limits.

In June 2011, he formally declared his candidacy. He was endorsed by the San Diego County Republican Party in March 2012. In the June 5 primary he placed first with 31.42% of the vote and advanced to a runoff election against U.S. Representative Bob Filner in November.

The U-T San Diego published a front-page endorsement of DeMaio before the June 2012 primary. The Voice of San Diego described the endorsement as unprecedented: "Actually, they weren't even on the front page — the editorials were wrapped around the page as though they were even more important."

On September 25, 2012, Sanders endorsed DeMaio to be his successor. At the time of the endorsement, a 10News and SurveyUSA poll of voters gave Filner a twelve-point lead over DeMaio.

On Election Day, DeMaio lost to Filner, 52.5% to 47.5%.

=== 2014 congressional election ===
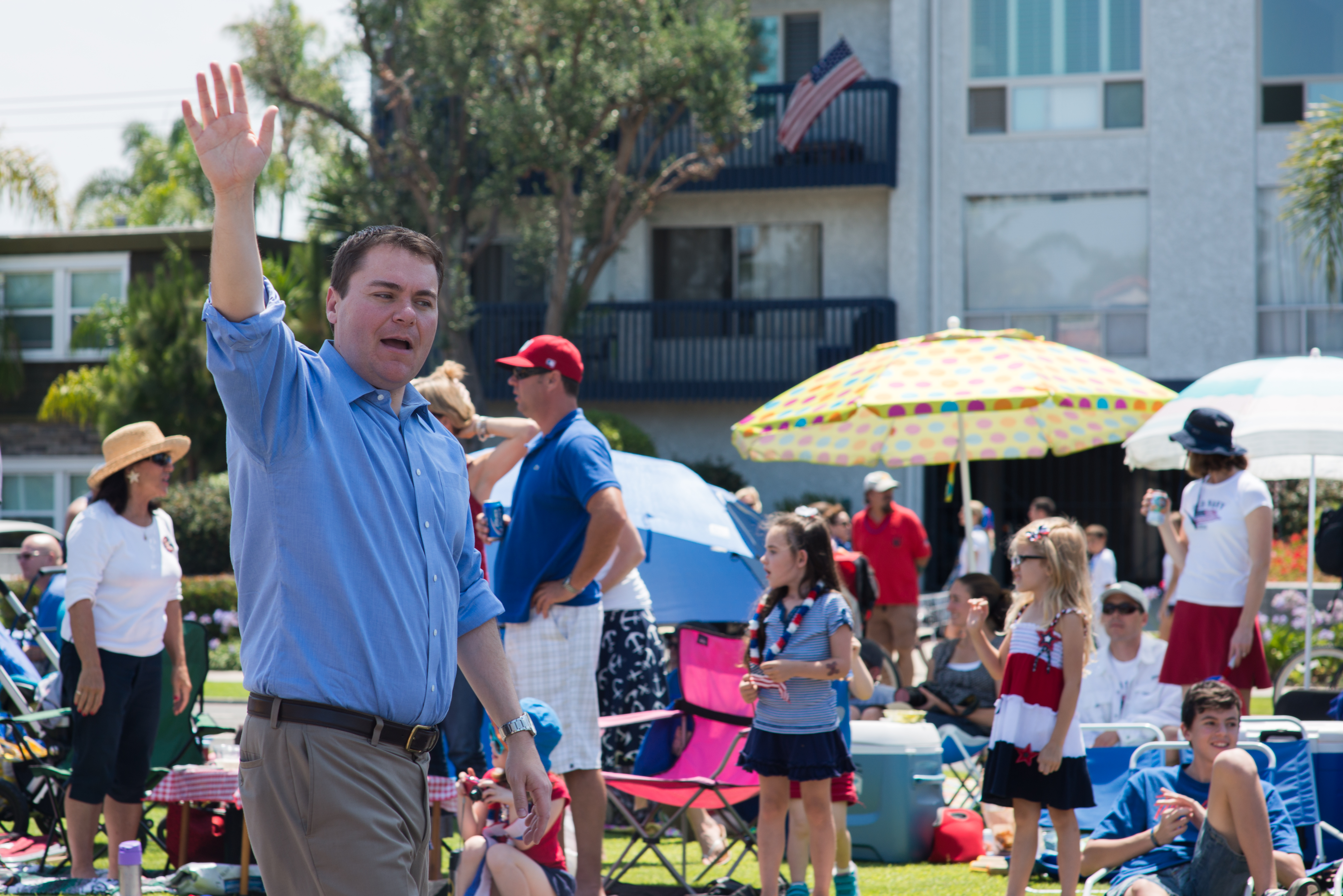
Carl DeMaio marching in Coronado, California's Independence Day Parade in 2013

On May 30, 2013, DeMaio announced his intention to run for Congress in 2014 against incumbent Scott Peters. DeMaio was one of three openly gay Republican candidates for Congress in the 2014 elections. In February 2014, he became the first congressional candidate to feature his same-sex partner in a campaign ad.

In September 2013, he considered running for mayor of San Diego in a November 2013 special election, called because of Filner's resignation, but decided to stay in the race for Congress. The month before the primary election, the campaign office of DeMaio was broken into; an affidavit signed by a San Diego Police Department detective, unsealed after the November 2014 election, stated the belief that Todd Bosnich was the culprit of the campaign office burglary. Also revealed in the unsealing, was that documents from the DeMaio campaign were received by the Scott Peters campaign manager in June, copied, and then turned over to the police "days later".

In the June 2014 primary, he came in second to Peters with 36% of the vote, ensuring DeMaio a place on the ballot in the November 2014 general election. Peters received 42% of the vote. In a poll conducted by SurveyUSA for the San Diego Union-Tribune and 10News during September 11–15, 2014, DeMaio and Peters were in a virtual dead heat with Peters polling at 47% and DeMaio at 46%. The same poll taken October 2–6 was again described as a dead heat, with DeMaio showing a 3-point lead over Peters – within the margin of error. An earlier Survey USA poll showed Peters leading by one point.

On November 7 the Associated Press called the District 52 congressional race for Peters. The final result was Peters 51.59% and DeMaio 48.41%.

=== 2020 congressional election ===
On August 5, 2019, DeMaio announced his candidacy for California's 50th congressional district in the 2020 election, then occupied by Congressman Duncan Hunter, a fellow Republican who was indicted for misusing campaign funds a month prior. An October poll found DeMaio to be polling ahead of Hunter and other Republican challengers. Hunter pleaded guilty to campaign finance violations in December 2019 and announced he would resign from Congress. His resignation became effective January 13, 2020. The March 3 primary election for the vacant seat pitted DeMaio against Democrat Ammar Campa-Najjar and other Republicans, including former Congressman Darrell Issa and state Assemblyman Brian Jones. The top two vote getters regardless of party go on to the general election. DeMaio came in third, so that Campa-Najjar and Issa competed in the November election. DeMaio threw his support behind Issa, his chief primary opponent, who placed second in the primary with 23.5% of the votes and went on to win the general election.

=== 2024 State Assembly Election ===
DeMaio ran for the District 75 seat against another Republican, Lakeside School Board Trustee Andrew Hayes. DeMaio won the general election with 57.02% of the vote.

== Political positions ==
He has stated his intent to propose a "No Budget, No Pay" law that would permanently penalize the pay of Members of Congress and political appointees in the White House when they fail to pass a budget on time."

According to the National Journal, he "has voiced support for gay marriage, abortion rights, and environmental protections." He announced his support for same-sex marriage after 2008, has participated in LGBT Pride, and was endorsed by Log Cabin Republicans, a PAC supportive of LGBT rights. DeMaio has called himself "constitutionally libertarian" on the issue of abortion saying that Roe v. Wade is settled precedent in the law, and that he supports the Hyde Amendment to prohibit federal funding for abortions.

On gun control, DeMaio has stated that he supports "full enforcement of existing laws as well as more resources to keep guns out of the hands of criminals and those with mental health disorders."

His campaign proposals for the 2020 campaign included a call to secure the border through a five-point initiative of fencing and walls, reform to the immigration and asylum system, ending Sanctuary cities, withholding federal funds from any state or local government that provides taxpayer-funded benefit for illegal immigrants, enforcing the E-verify program, and vetting legal immigrants through a merit-based process. He proposed a "Freedomcare" health insurance system to replace Obamacare, allowing individuals to buy health insurance across state lines and putting the government exchanges under private management. His "Fix Congress First Initiative" would "force Congress to live under the same laws as the rest of us." He proposes national legislation that would encourage Americans to carry weapons, after undergoing background checks, to combat mass shootings. Details include mandatory self-defense training in all schools, a national concealed-carry permit program, and better background checks.

== Electoral history ==
=== San Diego City Council ===
2008 San Diego City Council 5th district election
Candidate	Votes	%
Carl DeMaio	19,461	66.0
George George	9,953	34.0
Total votes	29,414	100.0

=== San Diego Mayor ===
2012 San Diego mayoral election
Party	Candidate	Votes	%
Republican	Carl DeMaio	73,508	31.4
Democratic	Bob Filner	73,216	30.5
Independent	Nathan Fletcher	57,939	24.1
Republican	Bonnie Dumanis	31,926	13.3
Nonpartisan	Tobiah Pettus	1,709	0.7
Write-in		752	0.3
Total votes		241,050	100.0
General election
Democratic	Bob Filner	245,092	52.5
Republican	Carl DeMaio	221,870	47.5
Total votes		466,962	100.0
Democratic gain from Republican			

=== U.S. House of Representatives ===
2014 California's 52nd congressional district election
Primary election
Party	Candidate	Votes	%
Democratic	Scott Peters (incumbent)	53,926	42.3
Republican	Carl DeMaio	44,954	35.3
Republican	Kirk Jorgensen	23,588	18.5
Republican	Fred J. Simon Jr.	5,040	4.0
Total votes		127,508	100.0
General election
Democratic	Scott Peters (incumbent)	98,826	51.6
Republican	Carl DeMaio	92,746	48.4
Total votes		191,572	100.0
Democratic hold			

2020 California's 50th congressional district primary election
Primary election
Party	Candidate	Votes	%
Democratic	Ammar Campa-Najjar	74,121	36.5
Republican	Darrell Issa	47,036	23.1
Republican	Carl DeMaio	40,347	19.9
Republican	Brian W. Jones	21,495	10.6
Democratic	Marisa Calderon	11,557	5.7
Republican	Nathan "Nate" Wilkins	4,276	2.1
Peace and Freedom	Jose Cortes	1,821	0.9
No party preference	Helen L. Horvath	1,249	0.6
No party preference	Henry Alan Ota	908	0.4
No party preference	Lucinda KWH Jahn	410	0.2
Total votes		203,220	100.0

=== California State Assembly ===
2024 California State Assembly 75th district election
Primary election
Party	Candidate	Votes	%
Republican	Carl DeMaio	54,350	42.9
Republican	Andrew Hayes	23,664	18.7
Democratic	Kevin Juza	23,010	18.2
Democratic	Christie Dougherty	12,675	10.0
Democratic	Joy Frew	9,362	7.4
Republican	Jack Fernandes	3,596	2.8
Total votes		126,657	100.0
General election
Republican	Carl DeMaio	121,167	57.0
Republican	Andrew Hayes	91,337	43.0
Total votes		212,504	100.0
Republican hold			

== Personal life ==
DeMaio is married to Jonathan Hale, owner of Hale Media which publishes San Diego Gay and Lesbian News and SDPix. DeMaio reportedly came out as gay to his family, friends and colleagues in 2000.

=== Sexual harassment allegations ===
In October 2014, the former campaign policy director of DeMaio's congressional campaign, Todd Bosnich, charged DeMaio with sexual harassment, saying that DeMaio had masturbated in front of him and touched him inappropriately. A similar accusation had previously been made in August 2013, when former City Council colleague Ben Hueso claimed that he had twice seen DeMaio masturbating in a public restroom. In early November, another former staffer, Justin Harper (then aged 25), accused DeMaio of sexual misconduct inside a bathroom at DeMaio's campaign headquarters. DeMaio denied the allegations, saying they were politically motivated.

On October 20, the San Diego County District Attorney declined to file charges against DeMaio regarding Bosnich's allegations of sexual misconduct. At the same time, it was reported that the FBI was conducting a separate investigation into Bosnich's allegations against DeMaio. In June 2015, Bosnich admitted that he had faked threatening emails he claimed were from DeMaio, and pleaded guilty to one count of obstruction of justice.

=== Neighbor harassment allegations ===
In October 2024, DeMaio and Hale's neighbors in Rancho San Bernardo petitioned a judge for a restraining order against the couple for alleged harassment over landscaping disputes. A judge denied the restraining order pending a hearing after finding the family was not in danger. The lawsuit was also notable because it identified DeMaio as a resident of Rancho San Bernardo, which is outside of the 75th Assembly district and differs from his legal residence in Fallbrook, thus leading to questions on whether he met the residency requirement to run for the district.
