= Rancho Encantada, San Diego =

Neighborhood of San Diego, California

Coordinates: 32°55′56.44″N 117°01′02.28″W

Rancho Encantada, also known as Stonebridge Estates, is a suburban neighborhood in San Diego, California, United States. It is bordered by the City of Poway to the north, the San Diego neighborhood of Scripps Ranch to the west, Marine Corps Air Station Miramar to the south, and unincorporated and undeveloped San Diego County to the east.

Rancho Encantada, like Miramar Ranch North, is often considered a part of Scripps Ranch; it is included in the Scripps Ranch Planning Group, the Scripps Ranch Civic Association (SRCA) and most Scripps Ranch community activities. It includes the following tracts: Calabria, Serenity, Sanctuary, Scripps Preserve, Viscaya, Montoro, Bellasario, Toll Brothers (Viewpoint was to be custom homes; however, the lots were purchased by Toll Brothers and included within that development), Mill Creek, Tiburon, The Warmington Collection, and Astoria. It is the least walkable neighborhood of San Diego.
