= 2024 San Diego County Board of Supervisors election =

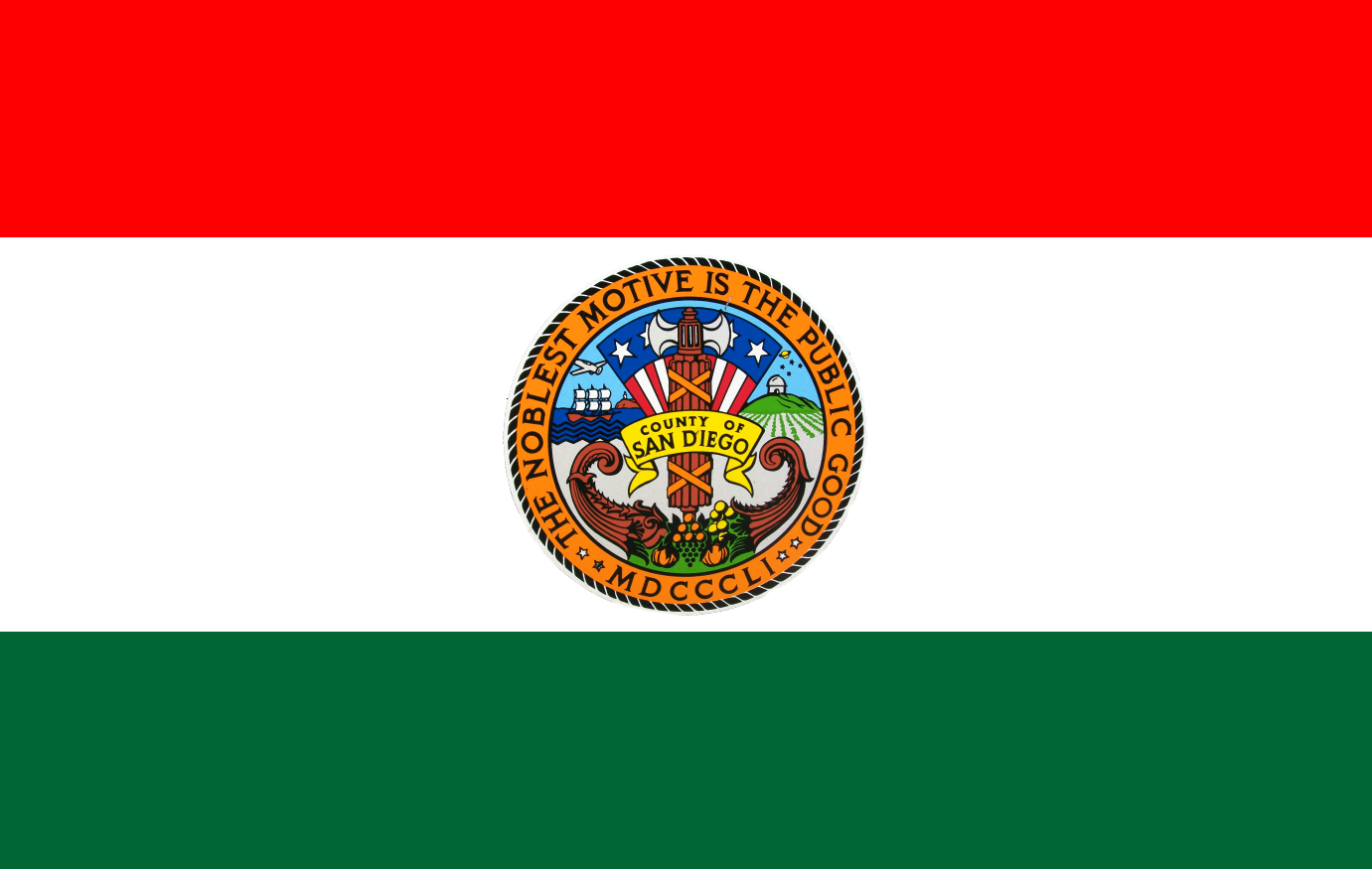
- November 5, 2024

3 of the 5 seats on the San Diego County Board of Supervisors
	Majority party	Minority party
Party	Democratic	Republican
Seats before	3	2
Seats after	3	2
Seat change	Steady	Steady
Chair before election
Nora Vargas
Democratic
Elected Chair
Terra Lawson-Remer (acting)
Democratic

The 2024 San Diego County Board of Supervisors election was held on Tuesday, November 5, 2024, to elect members of the San Diego County Board of Supervisors.

Three of the five seats on the board were up for election, with all three incumbents winning re-election. The election resulted in the continuation of a 3-2 Democratic majority. However, after the election, Chair Nora Vargas announced that she would not take the oath of office for a second term, leaving the board with a 2-2 stalemate. A special election will be held in 2025 to fill the vacancy.

Municipal elections in California are officially non-partisan, and although most candidates do identify a party preference, their party affiliations do not appear on the ballot. A two-round system is used for the elections, starting with primaries in March followed by runoff elections in November between the top-two candidates in each race.

== Background ==
Seats on the San Diego County Board of Supervisors in districts 1, 2, and 3 were up for election. Incumbents Nora Vargas, Joel Anderson, and Terra Lawson-Remer ran for re-election.

Top election issues included homelessness, immigration enforcement, and housing affordability, part of a broader housing crisis statewide.

== District 1 ==
District 1 comprises the communities of Chula Vista, National City, Imperial Beach, San Ysidro, Otay Mesa, Barrio Logan, Logan Heights, East Village, Golden Hill, Grant Hill, Lincoln Park, Memorial, Mount Hope, Mountain View, Nestor, Sherman Heights, Southcrest, Stockton, Bonita, Sunnyside, Lincoln Acres, La Presa and parts of Spring Valley.

Incumbent Nora Vargas, a Democrat, and Alejandro Galicia, a Republican, automatically advanced from the March 2024 primary, since no other candidates qualified to run. Vargas went on to defeat Galicia 62.5% to 37.5% in the November general election.

2024 San Diego County Board of Supervisors District 1 election
Candidate	Votes	%
Nora Vargas (incumbent)	127,608	62.46%
Alejandro Galicia	76,761	37.54%
Total votes	204,369	100.0%

== District 2 ==
District 2 comprises the cities of El Cajon, Poway, Santee, as well as over 40 unincorporated communities and tribes in eastern San Diego County.

Incumbent Joel Anderson, a Republican, and Gina Jacobs, a Democrat, automatically advanced from the March 2024 primary, since no other candidates qualified to run. Anderson went on to defeat Jacobs 59.8% to 40.2% in the November general election.

2024 San Diego County Board of Supervisors District 2 election
Candidate	Votes	%
Joel Anderson (incumbent)	155,232	59.81%
Gina Jacobs	104,326	40.19%
Total votes	259,558	100.0%

== District 3 ==
District 3 comprises the cities of Carlsbad, Coronado, Del Mar, Encinitas, Solana Beach and the communities of La Jolla, Little Italy, Midway, Mira Mesa, Mission Beach, Ocean Beach, Pacific Highlands, Point Loma, Rancho Peñasquitos, Sorrento Valley, Torrey Highlands, Pacific Beach, University City, Carmel Valley, Harmony Grove, Rancho Santa Fe, and Elfin Forest.

Incumbent Terra Lawson-Remer, a Democrat, and former mayor of San Diego Kevin Faulconer, a Republican, automatically advanced from the March 2024 primary, since no other candidates qualified to run. Lawson-Remer went on to defeat Faulconer 57.0% to 43.0% in the November general election.

2024 San Diego County Board of Supervisors District 3 election
Candidate	Votes	%
Terra Lawson-Remer (incumbent)	178,781	56.98%
Kevin Faulconer	134,991	43.02%
Total votes	313,772	100.0%

== Post-election ==
After the election, Chair Nora Vargas announced that she would not take the oath of office for a second term, citing "personal safety and security reasons." Vice chair Terra Lawson-Remer became acting chair of the board, and on January 14, 2025, the board voted to hold a special election to fill the vacancy left by Vargas' resignation.
