= 2025 San Diego County Board of Supervisors special election =

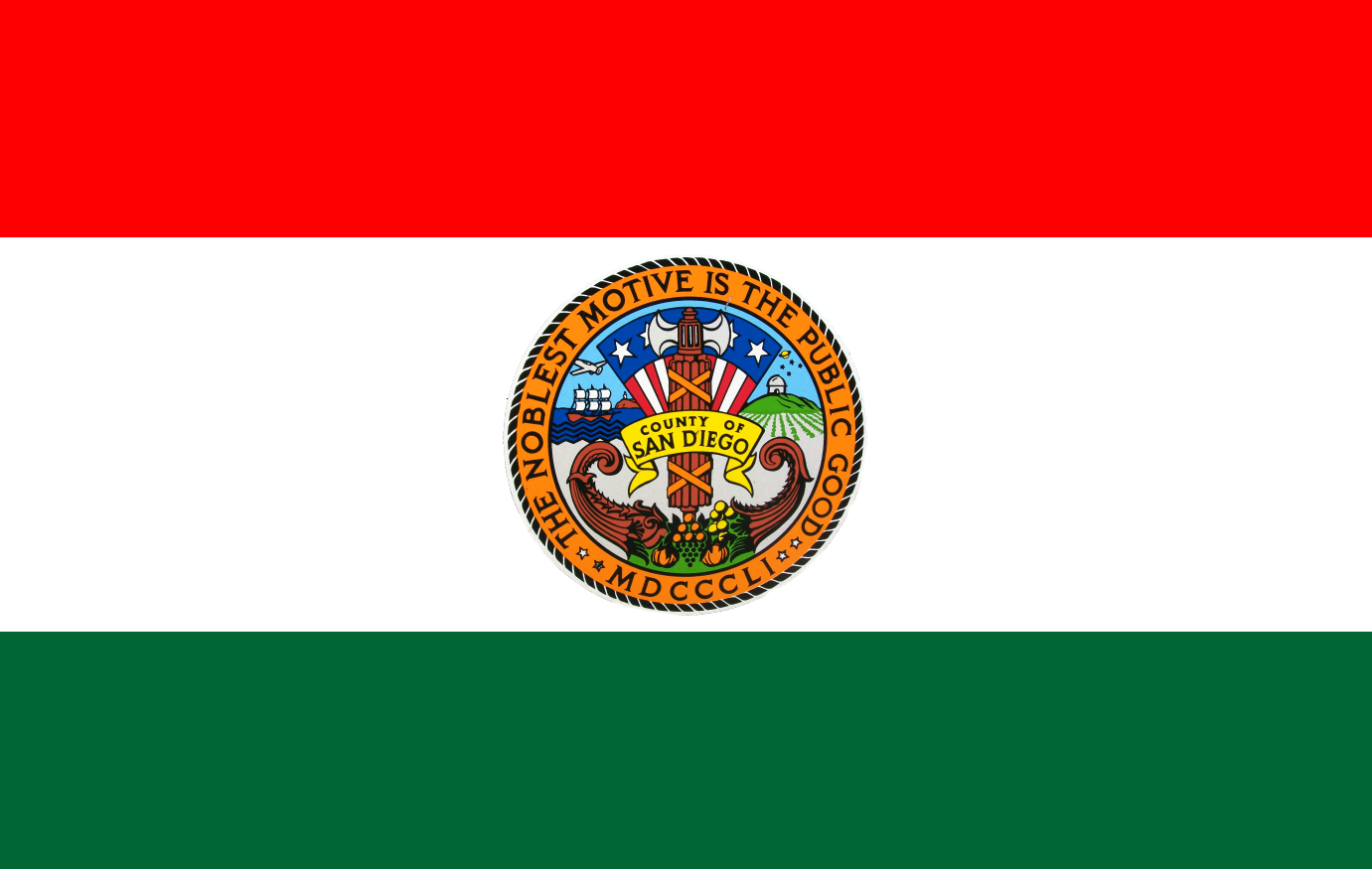
- April 8, 2025 (primary); July 1, 2025 (runoff)

1st Supervisorial District of the San Diego County Board of Supervisors
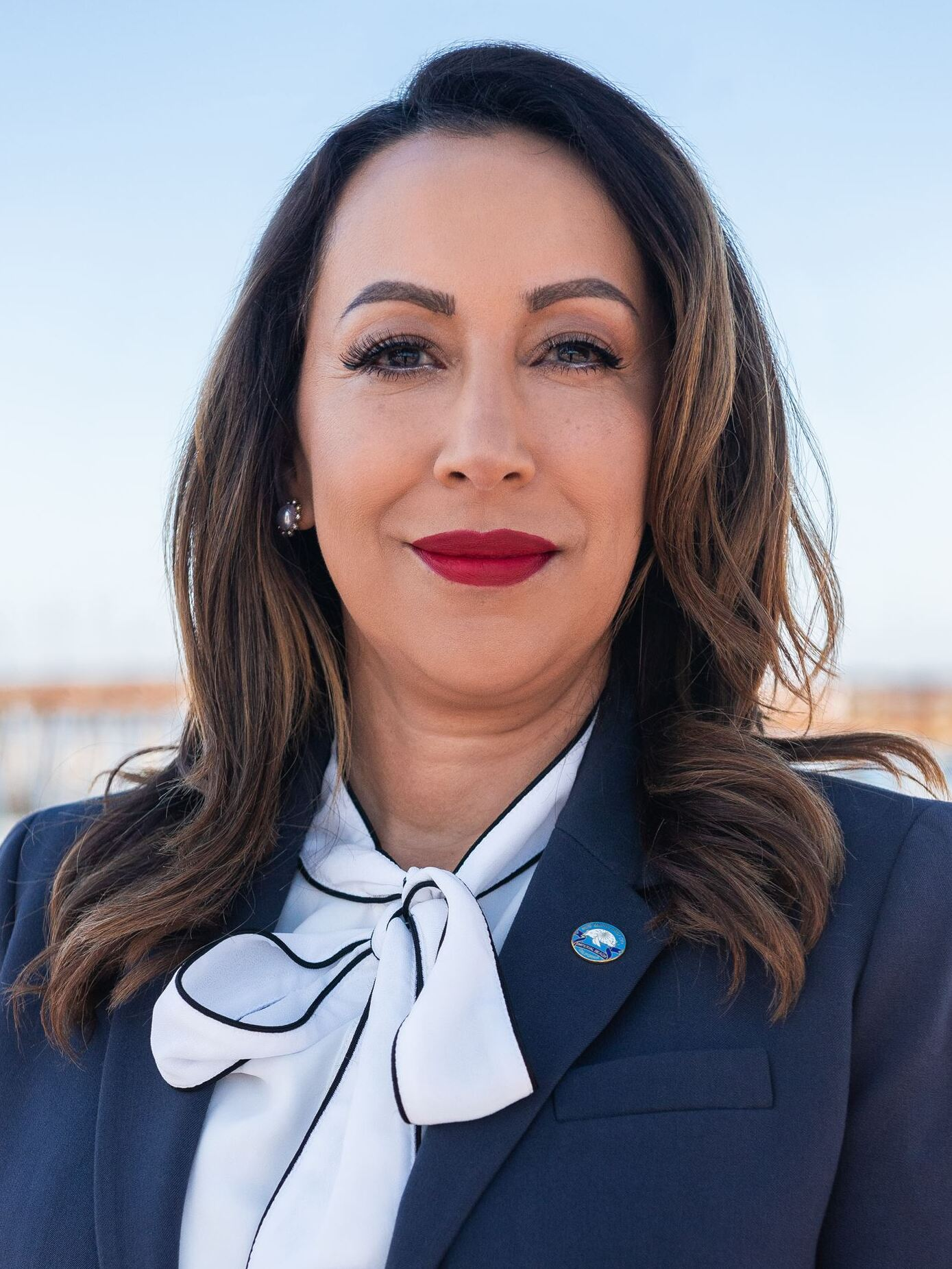

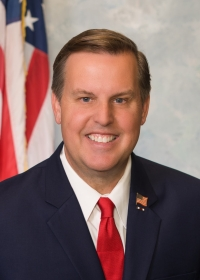
	Majority party	Minority party
Candidate	Paloma Aguirre	John McCann
Party	Democratic	Republican
First round	21,424; 32.33%	28,087; 42.38%
Runoff	42,026; 53.90%	35,943; 46.10%
- Runoff results by precinct Aguirre: 50–60% 60–70% 70–80% 80–90% >90% McCann: 50–60% 60–70% 70–80% Tie: 50% No data
Supervisor before election
Nora Vargas
Democratic
Elected Supervisor
Paloma Aguirre
Democratic

The 2025 San Diego County Board of Supervisors special election was held on Tuesday, July 1, 2025 to fill the 1st Supervisorial District seat on the San Diego County Board of Supervisors vacated by Nora Vargas, who resigned on January 6, 2025, for "personal safety and security reasons." The primary election was held on Tuesday, April 8, 2025, in which Chula Vista mayor John McCann and Imperial Beach mayor Paloma Aguirre advanced to the runoff election. Aguirre defeated McCann and is expected to be sworn in on July 22, 2025.

Municipal elections in California are officially non-partisan, and although most candidates do identify a party preference, their party affiliations do not appear on the ballot. As no candidate won a majority of votes in the primary, a runoff election was held between the top two vote-getting candidates.

== Background ==
On December 20, 2024, Chair Nora Vargas announced that she would not take the oath of office for a second term, despite having won 62.5% of the vote just weeks beforehand in the 2024 San Diego County Board of Supervisors election, citing "personal safety and security reasons." Vice chair Terra Lawson-Remer became acting chair of the board, and on January 14, 2025, the board voted to hold a special election to fill the vacancy left by Vargas' resignation.

Top election issues include the Tijuana River sewage crisis, homelessness, immigration, and housing affordability, part of a broader housing crisis statewide.

== Candidates ==
=== Advanced to general ===
- Paloma Aguirre, mayor of Imperial Beach (2022–present), former member of the Imperial Beach city council (2018–2022) (Party preference: Democratic)
- John McCann, mayor of Chula Vista (2022–present) (Party preference: Republican)

=== Eliminated in primary ===
- Carolina Chavez, member of the Chula Vista city council from district 1 (2022–present) (Party preference: Democratic)
- Elizabeth Efird, energy consultant
- Louis Fuentes, former mayor of Calexico (2008–2009), former Imperial County supervisor (2010) (Party preference: Republican)
- Vivian Moreno, member of the San Diego City Council from district 8 (2018–present) (Party preference: Democratic)
- Lincoln Pickard, perennial candidate (Party preference: Republican)

=== Declined to run ===
- David Alvarez, member of the California State Assembly from the 80th district (2018–present), candidate for mayor of San Diego in the 2013–2014 special election, former member of the San Diego City Council from district 8 (2010–2018)

== Primary election ==
=== Endorsements ===
Paloma Aguirre

U.S. representatives

- Mike Levin, U.S. Representative from California's 49th congressional district (2019-present)

State senators

- Steve Padilla, state senator from California's 18th senatorial district (2022-present), former mayor of Chula Vista (2002-2006), former member of the Chula Vista city council (1994-2002, 2016-2022)

Local officials

- Marcus Bush, member of the National City council
- Jennifer Campbell, former president of the San Diego city council (2020–2021), member of the San Diego city council from district 2 (2020–present)
- Luz Molina, member of the National City council
- Ron Morrison, mayor of National City (2006-2018, 2022-present), former member of the National City council (1992-2006, 2018-2022)
- José Rodriguez, member of the National City council
- Esther Sanchez, mayor of Oceanside
- Ditas Yamane, member of the National City council

Labor unions

- San Diego & Imperial Counties Labor Council, AFL–CIO
- Service Employees International Union Local 221

Organizations

- California Working Families Party
- Equality California
- La Voz Demócrata Club
- LGBTQ+ Victory Fund
- San Diego County Democratic Party
- Sierra Club San Diego Chapter

Newspapers

- San Diego Union-Tribune Editorial Board
Carolina Chavez

Local officials

- Cesar Fernandez, member of the Chula Vista City Council (2024–present)
- Michael Inzunza, member of the Chula Vista City Council (2024–present)
- Stephen Whitburn, member of the San Diego City Council (2020–present), former president pro tempore of the San Diego City Council (2020–2021)
John McCann

Organizations

- San Diego County Republican Party
- Lincoln Club San Diego
Vivian Moreno

Local officials

- Sean Elo-Rivera, member of the San Diego city council from district 9 (2020–present), former president of the San Diego city council (2021–2024)
- Henry Foster III, member of the San Diego city council from district 4 (2024–present)
- Joe LaCava, president of the San Diego city council (2024–present), member of the San Diego city council from district 1 (2020–present), former president pro tempore of the San Diego city council (2023-2024),
- Kent Lee, president pro tempore of the San Diego city council (2024–present), member of the San Diego city council from district 6 (2022–present)
- Monica Montgomery Steppe, member of the San Diego County Board of Supervisors from district 4 (2023–present), former president pro tempore of the San Diego City Council (2021–2023), former member of the San Diego City Council from district 4 (2018–2023)
- Jose Preciado, member of the Chula Vista city council
- Mary Salas, former mayor of Chula Vista (2014–2022)

Labor unions

- Carpenters Local 619
- Laborers' International Union of North America Local 89

Organizations

- Chula Vista Democratic Club

=== Results ===
2025 San Diego County Board of Supervisors District 1 special election
Candidate	Votes	%
John McCann	28,087	42.38%
Paloma Aguirre	21,424	32.33%
Vivian Moreno	8,934	13.48%
Carolina Chavez	5,128	7.74%
Louis Fuentes	1,053	1.59%
Elizabeth Efird	1,027	1.55%
Lincoln Pickard	619	0.93%
Total votes	66,272	100.0%

== General election ==
=== Results ===
2025 San Diego County Board of Supervisors District 1 special election
Candidate	Votes	%
Paloma Aguirre	42,026	53.90%
John McCann	35,943	46.10%
Total votes	77,969	100.0%
