= 2020 San Diego County Board of Supervisors election =

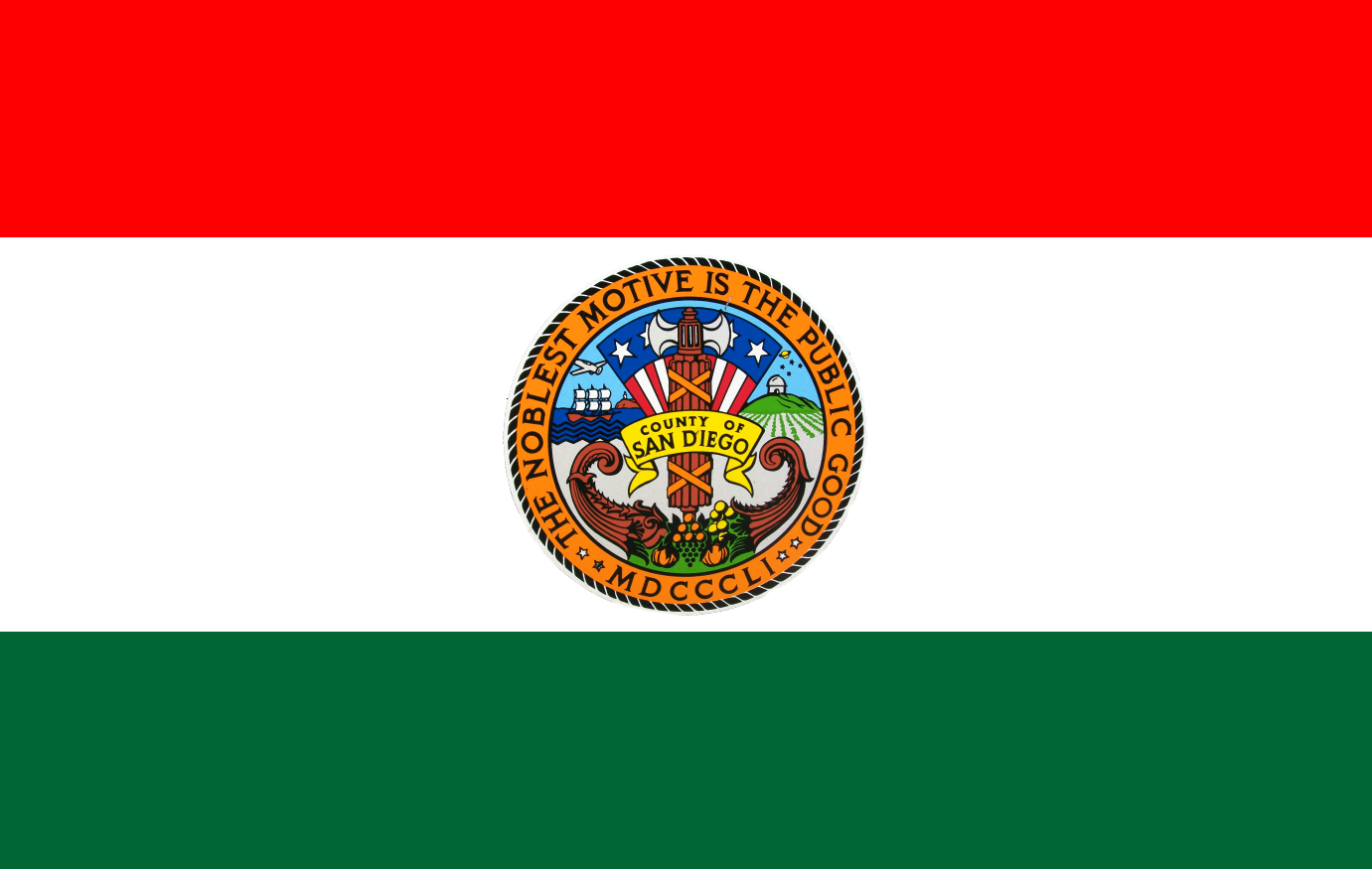
- November 3, 2020

3 of the 5 seats on the San Diego County Board of Supervisors
	Majority party	Minority party
Party	Democratic	Republican
Seats before	1	4
Seats after	3	2
Seat change	▲2	▼2
- Results of the elections: Democratic gain Republican hold No election
Chair before election
Greg Cox
Republican
Elected Chair
Nathan Fletcher
Democratic

The 2020 San Diego County Board of Supervisors election was held on Tuesday, November 3, 2020, with the primary election held on March 3, 2020. While the San Diego County Board of Supervisors is officially a nonpartisan institution, Republicans controlled four out of the five supervisory seats, while a Democrat held one. However, the election resulted in a Democratic majority for the first time in decades after Nora Vargas and Terra Lawson-Remer respectively won supervisorial elections in the first and third districts.

== Background ==
Even though county supervisor elections are officially nonpartisan in California, Republicans held a 4–1 majority in the San Diego County Board of Supervisors heading into the 2020 election, with the one being a lone Democrat.

== Results ==
In the general election, Democrats Nora Vargas and Terra Lawson-Remer respectively won supervisory seats in the first and third districts, assuring a Democratic majority in the next term and for the first time in a generation.

=== First district ===
==== First round ====
2020 San Diego County Board of Supervisors election for the first district
Candidate	Votes	%
Ben Hueso	32,263	29.29
Nora Vargas	20,767	18.86
Rafa Castellanos	17,934	16.28
Sophia Rodriguez	16,634	15.10
Alex Galicia	13,232	12.01
Henry Belisle	4,035	3.66
Camilo Marquez	2,679	2.43
Tony Villafranca	2,591	2.35
Total votes	110,135	100.00

==== Runoff ====
First district runoff results by precinct Vargas: 50-55%; 55-60%; 60-65%; 65-70%; 70-75%; >75%; Hueso: 50-55%; 55-60%; 60-65%; 65-70%; 70-75%; >75%; Tie No data

2020 San Diego County Board of Supervisors runoff election for the first district
Candidate	Votes	%
Nora Vargas	131,783	56.58
Ben Hueso	101,133	43.42
Total votes	232,916	100.00

=== Second district ===
==== General election ====
2020 San Diego County Board of Supervisors election for the second district
Candidate	Votes	%
Joel Anderson	59,803	35.46
Steve Vaus	52,357	31.04
Kenya Taylor	45,037	26.70
Brian Sesko	11,465	6.80
Total votes	168,662	100.00

==== Runoff ====
Second district runoff results by precinct Anderson: 50-55%; 55-60%; 60-65%; 65-70%; 70-75%; >75%; Vaus: 50-55%; 55-60%; 60-65%; 65-70%; 70-75%; >75%; Tie No data

2020 San Diego County Board of Supervisors runoff election for the second district
Candidate	Votes	%
Joel Anderson	145,103	50.05
Steve Vaus	144,821	49.95
Total votes	289,924	100.00

=== Third district ===
==== General election ====
2020 San Diego County Board of Supervisors general election for the third district
Candidate	Votes	%
Kristin Diane Gaspar (incumbent)	72,598	42.82
Terra Lawson-Remer	52,899	31.20
Olga Diaz	44,063	25.99
Total votes	169,560	100.00

==== Runoff ====
Third district runoff results by precinct Lawson-Remer: 50-55%; 55-60%; 60-65%; 65-70%; 70-75%; >75%; Gaspar: 50-55%; 55-60%; 60-65%; 65-70%; 70-75%; >75%; Tie No data

2020 San Diego County Board of Supervisors general election for the third district
Candidate	Votes	%
Terra Lawson-Remer	176,594	58.12
Kristin Diane Gaspar (incumbent)	127,259	41.88
Total votes	303,853	100.00

== Post-election ==
On January 5, 2021, the Board of Supervisors elected Nathan Fletcher as the new chair, succeeding Greg Cox.
