= Jim Desmond =

American politician

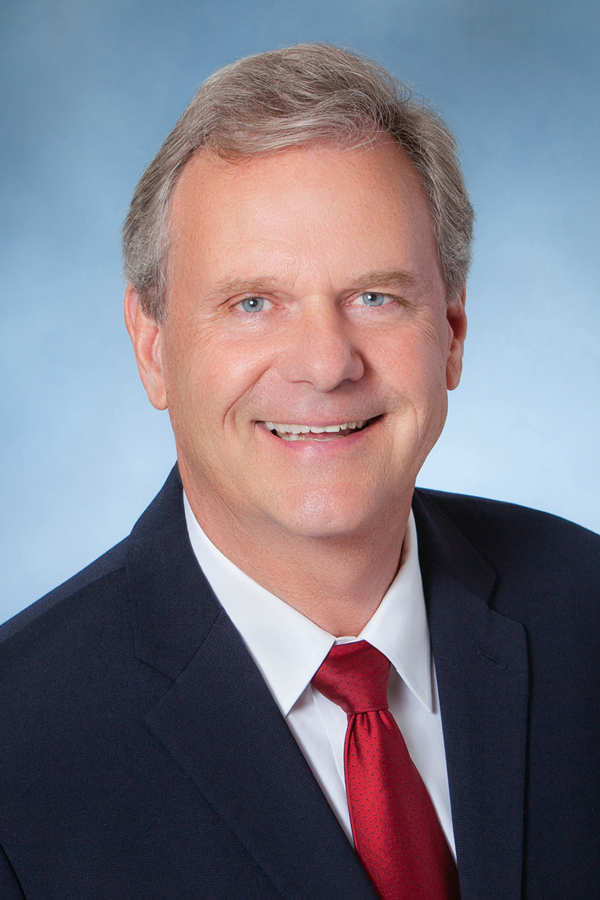
- Official portrait, 2023

Vice Chair of the San Diego County Board of Supervisors
- In office January 5, 2020 – January 5, 2021
- Preceded by: Greg Cox
- Succeeded by: Nora Vargas

Member of the San Diego County Board of Supervisors from the 5th district
- Incumbent
- Assumed office January 7, 2019
- Preceded by: Bill Horn

Mayor of San Marcos
- In office December 2006 – December 2018
- Preceded by: Corky Smith
- Succeeded by: Rebecca Jones

Personal details
- Party: Republican
- Children: 2
- Education: San Diego State University (BS)

Jim Desmond is an American politician and retired aviator serving as a member of the San Diego County Board of Supervisors since 2019, representing the fifth district. A member of the Republican Party, he previously served as vice chair of the board from 2020 to 2021, mayor of San Marcos, California from 2006 to 2018, and as a member of the San Marcos city council from 2004 to 2006.

In 2025, Desmond announced his candidacy for California's 49th congressional district in the 2026 election. In 2026, he announced that he would instead run in California's 48th congressional district after being redistricted into the district by Proposition 50.

== Early career and education ==
Desmond served in the United States Navy as an aircraft electrician from 1974 to 1979 before obtaining his pilot's license from San Diego Flight Schools between 1978 and 1983. He graduated with a bachelor's degree in electrical engineering from San Diego State University in 1985. After college, he founded Technical Standards, Inc. a technical writing company.

Desmond worked as a pilot from 1986 to 2020, flying Boeing 757 and 767 aircraft with Delta Air Lines. He retired early in 2020 due to the COVID-19 pandemic.

== Political career ==
Desmond served on the San Marcos city council from 2004 to 2006 before being elected as the city's mayor in 2006. He was re-elected in 2010 and 2014 without opposition.

Desmond sided with the Trump administration during a 2018 lawsuit against the state of California over its passage of Senate Bill 54, which made it a sanctuary state.

=== San Diego County Board of Supervisors ===
==== Elections ====
In 2018, Desmond ran for the fifth district seat on the San Diego County Board of Supervisors. Desmond, a Republican, and Michelle Gomez, a Democrat, advanced from the June primary with 45.1% and 22.9% of the vote, respectively. Desmond went on to defeat Gomez in the November general election with 56.3% of the vote.

He ran for re-election in 2022 facing a Democratic challenger, neuroscientist Tiffany Boyd-Hodgson. Since no other candidates qualified to run, both candidates automatically advanced from the June primary. Desmond went on to defeat Boyd-Hodgson 60.1% to 39.9% in the November general election.

==== Tenure ====
Desmond was critical of the government response to COVID-19, arguing that schools and the economy should be reopened safely and that the dangers of the disease, particularly in schools, were exaggerated.

Desmond criticized the immigration policy of the Biden administration, saying that it made the United States "more unsafe." In 2024, he testified before the Republican-led House Committee on Homeland Security, saying that an influx of migrants have placed a strain on San Diego County's resources.

In December 2024, he voted against a resolution restricting law enforcement in San Diego County from using county resources to cooperate with federal authorities, including ICE.

In February 2025, Desmond attended a press conference with other Republicans from Southern California to promote a state senate bill that would weaken California's sanctuary law, SB54, that limits law enforcement's ability to cooperate with ICE.

In April 2025, Desmond sent letters to U.S. Secretary of Defense Pete Hegseth and U.S. Secretary of State Marco Rubio demanding intervention in the Tijuana River Valley sewage crisis, citing concerns about public health issues and beach closures related to the crisis.

=== U.S. House of Representatives ===
==== Elections ====
In 2025, Desmond announced his candidacy for California's 49th congressional district in the 2026 election, challenging incumbent Democratic Congressman Mike Levin.

In 2026, Desmond announced that he would instead run for California's 48th congressional district after redistricting due to Proposition 50. Incumbent Darrell Issa announced that he would not seek re-election and endorsed Desmond.

== Personal life ==
Desmond is married and has two children. As of 2022, Desmond and his wife reside in Oceanside, California.
