= Greg Cox (politician) =

American politician

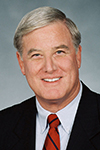

Chair of the San Diego County Board of Supervisors
- In office January 5, 2020 – January 5, 2021
- Preceded by: Dianne Jacob
- Succeeded by: Nathan Fletcher

Vice Chair of the San Diego County Board of Supervisors
- In office January 5, 2019 – January 5, 2020
- Preceded by: Dianne Jacob
- Succeeded by: Jim Desmond

Member of the San Diego County Board of Supervisors from the 1st district
- In office January 1995 – December 2020
- Preceded by: Brian Bilbray
- Succeeded by: Nora Vargas

Mayor of Chula Vista, California
- In office 1981–1990
- Preceded by: Will T. Hyde
- Succeeded by: Gayle McCandliss

Personal details
- Party: Republican
- Spouse: Cheryl Cox
- Education: San Diego State University (BA, MA)

Greg Cox is an American politician and businessman who served as a member of the San Diego County Board of Supervisors from 1995 to 2020, representing District 1. A member of the Republican Party, he previously served as the mayor of Chula Vista, California, from 1981 to 1990.

== Career ==
=== Mayoralty ===
Cox served as mayor of Chula Vista, California from 1981 until 1990. He was investigated in 1997 by the state Fair Political Practices Commission for failing to include a $2.2 million commercial Home Federal Savings loan in his interest disclosure; he admitted making an "oversight", but was eventually cleared by the Commission of any wrongdoing. After his resignation in 1990, he worked as Director for Local Government in the state Office of Planning and Research.

=== County Supervisor ===
As County Supervisor, he has voted to fund a number of regional construction projects and programs intended to address homelessness in the county. He was the sole dissenter in a 2018 Board of Supervisors vote siding with the administration of President Donald Trump against California's sanctuary state law, Senate Bill 54; Cox called the vote a waste of money, and expressed the concern that it could increase distrust of law enforcement. In 2016, he reported himself to a watchdog group and paid a $3,000 fine after realizing he had failed to disclose a conflict of interest relating to a vote on a permit for SeaWorld San Diego, in which his wife, Cheryl Cox—also a former mayor of Chula Vista—held stock. In campaigns, he has stressed his support for the development project in the Chula Vista Bayfront, for law enforcement, and for environmental protection regulations.

Cox's constituency, District 1, includes the cities of Coronado, Imperial Beach, Chula Vista, National City and communities within San Diego including Barrio Logan, Chollas View, Grant Hill, La Playa, Lincoln Park, Logan Heights, Memorial, Mount Hope, Mountain View, Nestor, Otay Mesa, Palm City, Point Loma, San Ysidro, Shelltown, Sherman Heights, Southcrest, Stockton, Sunset Cliffs and parts of downtown San Diego. The district also includes the unincorporated communities of Bonita, Sunnyside, Lincoln Acres, and East Otay Mesa.

=== Other ventures ===
Cox is the incumbent president of the National Association of Counties, a nonprofit organization that represents county governments in federal affairs. In this role, he has focused on helping counties improving services for constituents. As president of the NACo, he is advised by consultant and former San Diego County administrator Walt Ekard, at the expense of San Diego County. Cox is also a former president of the California State Association of Counties and League of California Cities.
