= Steve Vaus =

American singer-songwriter

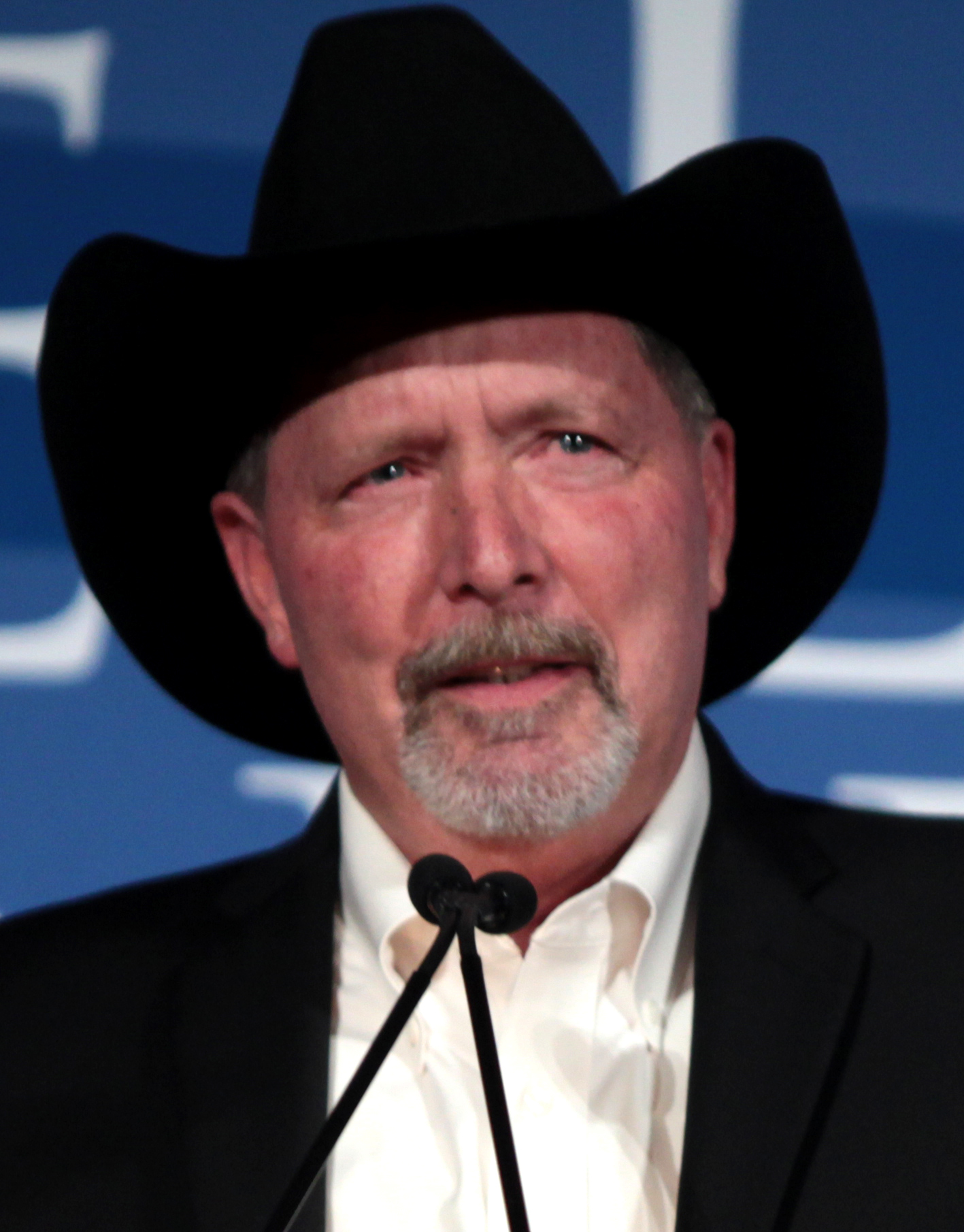

Background information
- Also known as: Buck Howdy
- Born: Steven Timothy Vaus; April 7, 1962 (age 64); Los Angeles, California, U.S.
- Origin: San Diego, California, U.S.
- Genres: Children's music; Country music
- Instruments: Vocals, guitar
- Years active: 1992–present
- Label: RCA Nashville, MCA Nashville

Mayor of Poway, California
- Incumbent
- Assumed office November 2014

Personal details
- Party: Republican
- Education: Eisenhower College

Steve Vaus (also known as Buck Howdy; born April 7, 1962) is an American recording artist and politician serving as the mayor of Poway, California, since 2014. In 2020, he ran for a seat on the San Diego County Board of Supervisors, losing narrowly to Joel Anderson.

== Early life and education ==
Vaus was born in Los Angeles. As a child, he lived on a cattle ranch in Grants Pass, Oregon, and in Westchester County, New York. After graduating from Eisenhower College in Seneca Falls, New York, Vaus relocated to San Diego to be closer to his parents.

== Career ==
=== Music ===
Vaus primarily records country music and country music for children. He is also known for his Christmas recordings including The Stars Come Out for Christmas series. Vaus established "Carols by Candlelight" in 1990, a charity fundraiser for various charities serving children including Rady Children's Hospital in San Diego which has become a 34-year San Diego tradition. In 1992, Vaus's song "We Must Take America Back" reached #68 on Hot Country Songs.

Vaus has been nominated for four Grammy Awards, winning the Grammy Award for Best Spoken Word Album for Children in 2010.

=== Politics ===
Steve Vaus was elected in 2012 to a four-year term on the Poway City Council. On November 4, 2014, he was elected mayor of Poway. He has been praised for his response to the Poway synagogue shooting in 2019, and he told the world that "we will put our arms around one another and walk through this dark day together".

Vaus served as Chair of the San Diego Association of Governments from 2018 to 2020.

In May 2019, Vaus announced his candidacy for a seat on the San Diego County Board of Supervisors. In the March 3, 2020 primary, he advanced to the general election. He ran against another Republican, state senator Joel Anderson. He lists his priorities as protecting the county from wildfire and crime, protecting open space, and encouraging the development of more housing. His campaign was endorsed by the editorial board of The San Diego Union-Tribune.

He lost this election by 282 votes, or 0.09% of the 289,924 votes counted in the election. In 2022 he was elected to a third four-year term as mayor of Poway.

== Discography ==
=== Albums ===
Year	Album	
1992	Never Had a Chance	Steve Vaus
1994	Voice of America	Steve Vaus
2009	Aaaaah! Spooky, Scary Stories & Songs	as Buck Howdy
2010	American Dreams	as Buck Howdy
2012	The Best of Buck Howdy	as Buck Howdy

=== Singles ===
Year	Single	Peak positions
Year	Single	US Country
1992	"We Must Take America Back"	68

=== Music videos ===
Year	Video
1992	"We Must Take America Back"
