= Dave Roberts (California politician) =

American politician (born 1960)

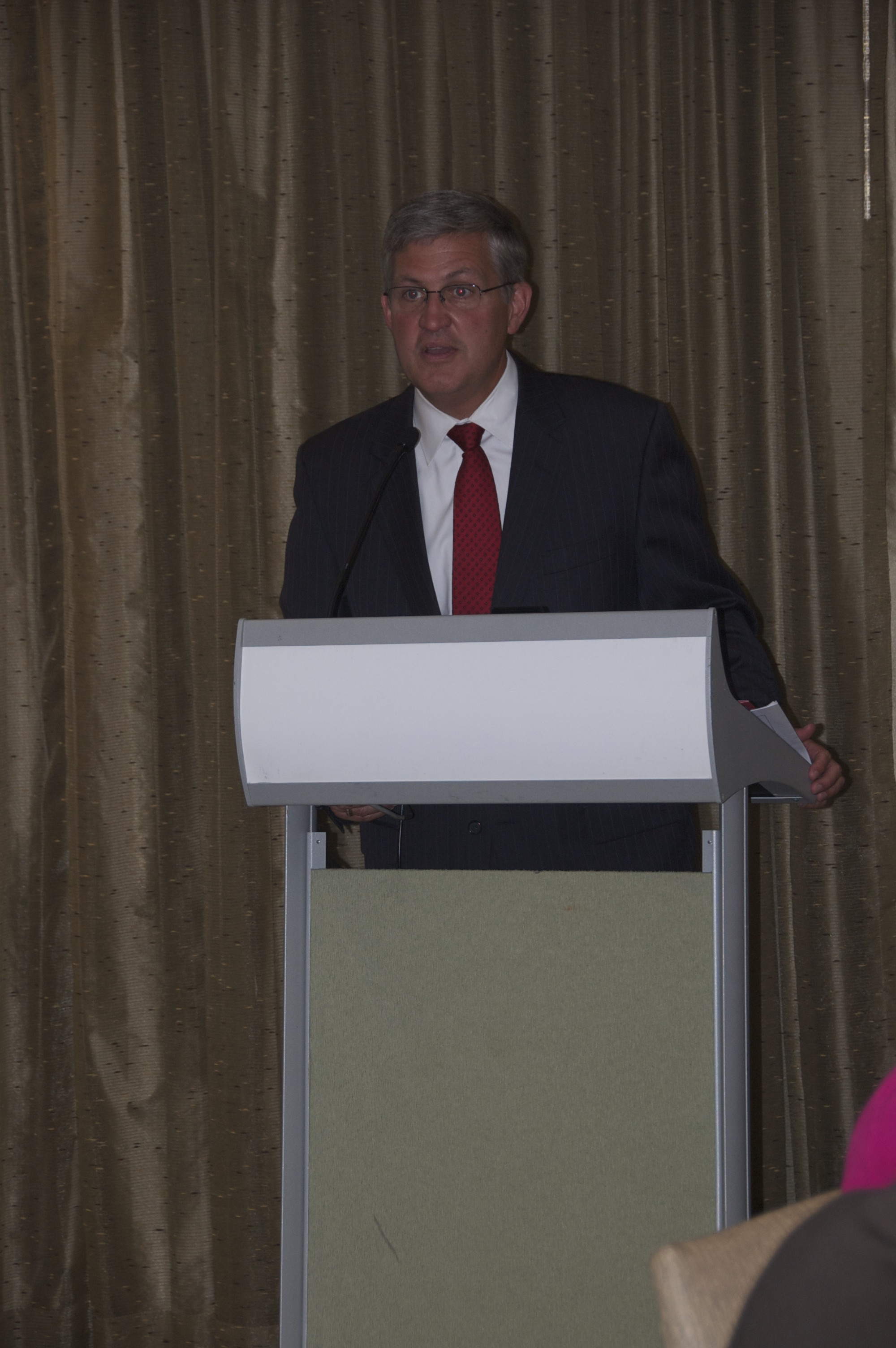

Chair of the San Diego County Board of Supervisors
- In office January 5, 2016 – January 5, 2017
- Preceded by: Bill Horn
- Succeeded by: Dianne Jacob

Vice Chair of the San Diego County Board of Supervisors
- In office January 5, 2015 – January 5, 2016
- Preceded by: Bill Horn
- Succeeded by: Dianne Jacob

Member of the San Diego County Board of Supervisors for the 3rd district
- In office January 7, 2013 – January 9, 2017
- Preceded by: Pam Slater-Price
- Succeeded by: Kristin Gaspar

Member of the Solana Beach City Council
- In office 2004–2012

Personal details
- Born: 1960 (age 65–66) Riverton, Connecticut, U.S.
- Party: Democratic
- Spouse: Wally Oliver
- Children: 5
- Education: American University (BA, MPA)

David W. Roberts (born 1960) is an American politician from Solana Beach, California. He was the county supervisor for San Diego County from 2012 to 2016, representing district 3, which includes portions of San Diego and most of north San Diego County. He was formerly the Mayor of Solana Beach. He is a Democrat.

== Early life and education ==
He was born and raised in Riverton, Connecticut, in 1960. His family has resided in Connecticut for 11 generations since 1629. After graduating from Northwestern Regional High School, he attended The Citadel, but left after he was beaten by a fellow cadet because of his sexual orientation. He wound up at American University in Washington, D.C., where he earned a Bachelor of Arts in political science and economics and a Master of Public Administration. He is also a graduate of the University of Virginia’s Sorensen Institute for Political Leadership, the Harvard Kennedy School for State and Local Leaders, and the Air Command and Staff College.

== Career ==
He was a vice president for government relations of the Healthcare Information and Management Systems Society (HIMSS), an international non-profit, but retired from that position when he was sworn in as county supervisor. Before that, he worked as a corporate vice president in the healthcare business unit of the Science Applications International Corporation (SAIC). Earlier, he served as a budget analyst for the United States Department of Defense and as a staffer for Senator Lowell Weicker.

He has also served as a federal advisory commission member in the administrations of President George W. Bush and Barack Obama in the United States Department of Health and Human Services. He was previously a co-chair of the Centers for Medicare & Medicaid Services Advisory Panel of Outreach and Education.

In 2014, he was elected second vice president of the California State Association of Counties (CSAC). In addition, he serves as co-chair of both the National Association of Counties (NACo) Membership Committee and Immigration Reform Task Force and as an active member of the CSAC and NACo Health Steering Committees.

=== Solana Beach City Council ===
He was elected to the Solana Beach City Council in 2004 and re-elected in 2008. He served as mayor in 2008 and as deputy mayor in 2011 and 2012. While on the council he is credited for work on traffic-calming projects, a local coastal plan, business relations, opening new parks, a plastic bag ban, and support for the arts and North Coast Repertory Theatre.

=== San Diego County Board of Supervisors ===
He was elected to the San Diego County Board of Supervisors in 2012 to represent the 3rd district, replacing retiring supervisor Pam Slater-Price. He narrowly defeated Republican Steve Danon, chief of staff to Congressman Brian Bilbray, in the November 2012 runoff election. The race was so close that Danon did not concede until nine days after the election. The final tally was 51.14% for Roberts to 48.86% for Danon. He was sworn in on January 7, 2013.

Roberts was the only Democrat on the Board of Supervisors, which had consisted only of Republicans for more than two decades. (Local elections are nonpartisan under California state law, but most officeholders do identify themselves as Democrats or Republicans.) As a supervisor, he hoped to strengthen the county's mental health services and launch a solar energy initiative.

From June to November 2015, Roberts chaired the San Diego County Behavioral Health Advisory Board Suicide Reduction Workgroup, which made 10 recommendations to the Board of Supervisors to reduce suicides in San Diego County. Two of the 10 recommendations were implemented. In November 2015, he was unanimously elected First Vice President of the California State Association of Counties (CSAC). In February 2016, he was unanimously elected as one of two California representatives on the National Association of Counties (NACo). In January 2016, Roberts' colleagues unanimously elected him as chair pro tem of the San Diego County Board of Supervisors, his third year in a county board leadership position.

In 2016, he ran for re-election. His opponent was Republican Encinitas Mayor Kristin Gaspar. The result was too close to call for more than a week after the election. At first, Roberts was in the lead by 2,200 votes, then Gaspar pulled ahead by 15 votes with many ballots still to be tallied. By Thanksgiving, Gaspar's lead had grown to 1,090 votes, after steady gains throughout the preceding week. Roberts conceded on November 27.

==== Allegations of hostile work environment ====
In May 2015, two of Robert's former staff members filed claims against the County of San Diego seeking monetary relief while alleging various acts of wrongdoing by Supervisor Roberts including misuse of County resources and employee favoritism. A third former employee filed a similar claim in June 2015. Roberts denied all of the allegations made against him. Roberts he conceded that he sent what he termed to be "jovial texting" to county staff stating that a particular employee should keep him warm on a county trip and claimed he would sleep in the same bed with him on a separate trip. That employee subsequently filed a lawsuit against two of the former staffers who had filed claims against the county regarding Robert's alleged behavior, for spreading “salacious rumors in the workplace.” Roberts was not named in the lawsuit.

On September 15, 2015, The San Diego Union-Tribune and Los Angeles Times newspapers reported that the Board of Supervisors had agreed to settlements totaling $310,000 for three of Roberts' former staffers in relation to various claims that he had created a hostile work environment. The four presiding county supervisors who agreed to the settlement also released a statement, "In the opinion of the Board, activities that occurred in the District 3 office, at a minimum, showed poor judgment by the Supervisor. And, although not conclusive, the investigative material surrounding the inappropriate use of County funds, promoting a hostile work environment, an alleged bribe, campaigning on County time, improper use of a County vehicle and retaliation against District 3 staff members is significant and a matter of concern for the Board of Supervisors."

== Personal life ==
Roberts is a married gay man; he and his spouse Wally Oliver have five adopted children. They live in Solana Beach, California, in the former home of singer Patti Page. Roberts and his oldest son are both Eagle Scouts. Roberts and his spouse are active members of North San Diego County Adoptive Parents Association and Friends of the Solana Beach Library. In 2014 amid the statewide drought, they removed over 6,000 square feet of turf and installed artificial turf to save over 165,000 gallons of potable water per year.
