= San Diego County Library =

Public library system in California, US

- Branches: 33

Access and use
- Circulation: 11.5 million
- Population served: 1,005,838
- Members: 641,276

Other information
- Director: Migell Acosta
- Employees: 327
- Website: sdcl.org

The San Diego County Library is a public library system serving San Diego County, California. Any person living in the state is eligible for a free library card, though residents of other counties have limited access to the online resources. It consists of 33 branches, two bookmobiles, and two 24/7 Library to Go kiosks. Library Journal and Gale (part of Cengage Learning) conferred the 2012 Library of the Year award on the San Diego County Library.

During the 2015–2016 fiscal year the San Diego County Library circulated over 11.5 million books, CDs, DVDs, and other material formats; recorded 5.4 million visits to library branches and hosted 34,890 library programs. It is one of the 25 busiest libraries in the United States as measured by materials circulated. Despite budget cuts, the county library system has increased hours of operation.

== Services ==
=== Circulation ===
The San Diego County Library circulates a variety of materials, including books, DVDs, compact discs, downloadable audiobooks, and magazines. The library carries materials in a variety of languages.

Books can be borrowed from the County library through the San Diego Public Library system. In 2007, the San Diego County Library joined The San Diego Circuit, a consortium of libraries that includes San Diego State University, UC San Diego, CSU San Marcos, and the University of San Diego. Library cardholders with any Circuit library may request books to be transferred to their local library at no charge.

The San Diego County Library also participates in the Link+ borrowing consortium, loaning and borrowing books and media from over 40 libraries throughout California and Nevada, under much the same borrowing procedure as the San Diego Circuit.

Customers are able to browse the catalog via the Internet, enabling them to request items, and view their account. Most library branches have express checkout machines that allow customers to check their items out themselves. Many branches of the library have express check in machines that allow customers to check their items in themselves as well.

Some customers may qualify for the library's Books-by-Mail program.

=== Public computer services ===
Each branch library offers free computer use, including internet access and word processing. All branches offer free Wi-Fi internet access. Some branches offer 3D printing for a small fee. The library subscribes to a number of subscription online resources (e.g. Morningstar, OverDrive downloadable audiobooks) that customers may access from home.

=== Events ===
The San Diego County Library provides a wide range of programming for customers of all ages. During the 2007–2008 fiscal year, the library system hosted 13,858 programs. The library often hosts performers, such as musicians, magicians, dancers, and puppeteers. Other events include book discussions, film screenings, and craft instruction. The San Diego County Library publishes a comprehensive print calendar detailing events at every branch library, as well as a web-based calendar, located on the library's web site.

=== Literacy Services & Online High School ===
LEARN (Libraries Empower All to Read Now) is the San Diego County Library's adult literacy program. LEARN offers free tutoring in basic reading, writing and math skills, as well as tutoring in standardized tests, such as the GED and the ASVAB. LEARN also provides U.S. citizenship and naturalization classes as well as services for English as a Second Language (ESL) in collaboration with community partners.

The San Diego County Library offers adults an opportunity to earn an accredited high school diploma through the Career Online High School program.

== Branches ==
The San Diego County Library is composed of 33 branches, located in:

- 4S Ranch
- Alpine
- Bonita
- Borrego Springs
- Campo
- Cardiff
- Casa De Oro
- Crest
- Del Mar
- Descanso
- El Cajon
- Encinitas
- Fallbrook
- Fletcher Hills
- Imperial Beach
- Jacumba
- Julian
- Lakeside
- La Mesa
- Lemon Grove
- Lincoln Acres
- Pine Valley
- Potrero
- Poway
- Ramona
- Rancho San Diego
- Rancho Santa Fe
- San Marcos
- Santee
- Solana Beach
- Spring Valley
- Valley Center
- Vista

There are also two mobile libraries, which serve the east and north parts of San Diego County. There are also four 24/7 Library to Go kiosks; located in Bonsall, Boulevard, Chula Vista, and San Diego.

Anyone possessing a library card can borrow and return books at any branch. In addition, materials may be transferred between these branches for pickup by customers, at no charge.
