= San Diego County Board of Supervisors =

Legislative branch of the county government of San Diego County, California

County of San Diego Board of Supervisors
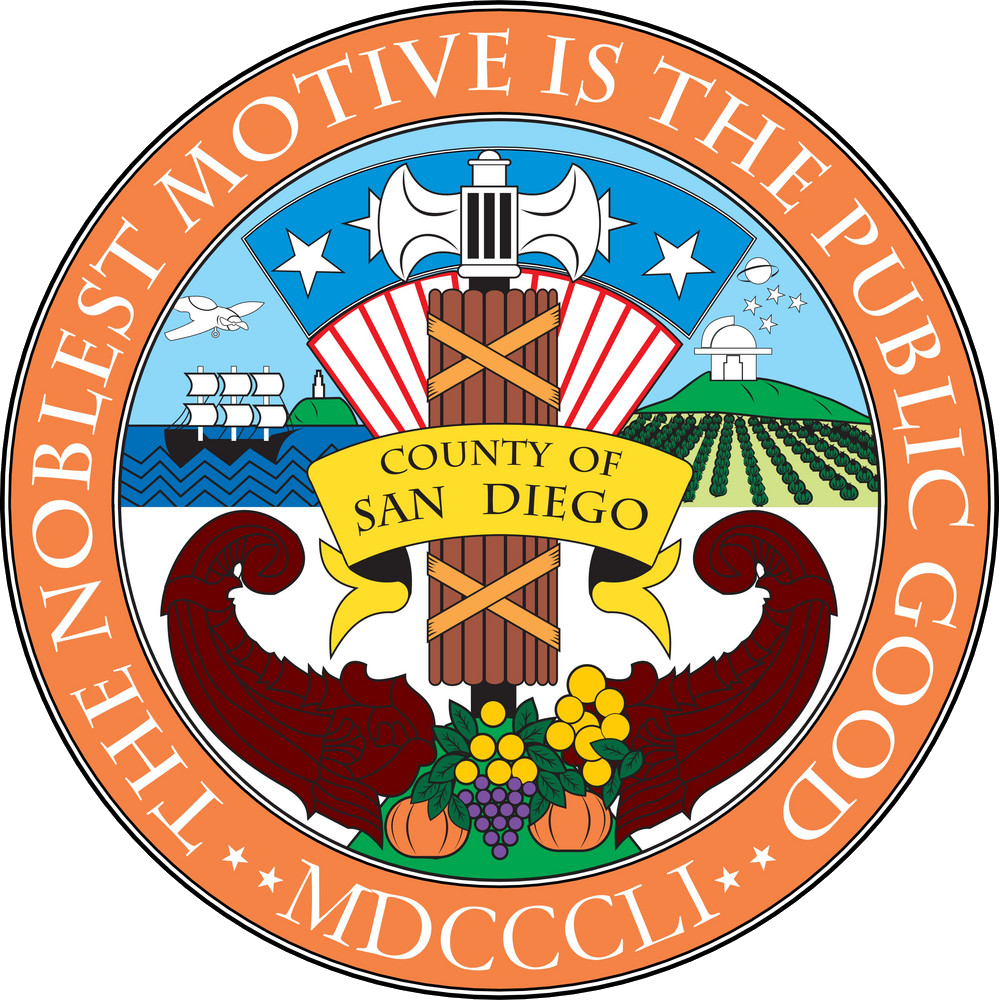

Type
- Type: Unicameral
- Term limits: Two terms

History
- Founded: 1850

Leadership
- Chair: Terra Lawson-Remer (D)
- Vice Chair: Monica Montgomery Steppe (D)
- Chair Pro Tem: Paloma Aguirre (D)

Structure
- Seats: 5
- Political groups: Nonpartisan (de jure); Democratic (3); Republican (2)
- Length of term: Four years

Elections
- Voting system: Two-round system
- Last election: July 1, 2025 (Special)
- Next election: June 2, 2026

Website
- County of San Diego Board of Supervisors

The San Diego County Board of Supervisors is the legislative and executive branch of the county government of San Diego County, California. Though officially nonpartisan, three Democrats and two Republicans currently comprise the Board of Supervisors.

== History ==
Between 1995 and 2013, the same five people, all Republican, held seats in the Board of Supervisors: Greg Cox, Bill Horn, Diane Jacob, Ron Roberts, and Pam Slater-Price. In 2012, Democrat Dave Roberts won the seat from the retiring Slater-Price, who endorsed his candidacy. However, Encinitas mayor Kristin Gaspar, a Republican, unseated the lone Democrat in 2016, whose campaign was harmed by a workplace scandal. In 2018, Nathan Fletcher defeated former San Diego County District Attorney Bonnie Dumanis to take Ron Roberts' seat, returning a Democrat to the Board of Supervisors.

In the 2020 election, the Democrats won control of the Board of Supervisors for the first time in decades as Nora Vargas and Terra Lawson-Remer won elections in their respective supervisory districts. Meanwhile, Republican former state senator Joel Anderson narrowly defeated Poway Mayor Steve Vaus, a fellow Republican, to succeed the retiring Jacob.

Nathan Fletcher, the supervisor representing district 4, resigned in 2023 amid sexual misconduct allegations, prompting a special election in which Monica Montgomery Steppe was elected to his former seat. Montgomery Steppe is the first Black woman to serve as a supervisor in the county's history, and her inauguration marked the first time a majority of the supervisors were women.

Nora Vargas was re-elected to another term in November 2024, but on December 20, she announced that she would not be taking the oath of office in January 2025 "due to personal safety and security reasons." As a result, the Board of Supervisors was split between two Democrats and two Republicans. A special election to fill Vargas' seat was held on April 8, 2025, with a runoff scheduled for July 1st between Paloma Aguirre, Mayor of Imperial Beach and John McCann, Mayor of Chula Vista. During this period the role of chair remained vacant, as the board failed to agree on a replacement. Following Aguirre's victory in the runoff Terra Lawson-Remer was elected as chair in July 2025.

== Governance ==
Following Proposition B's passage by San Diego County voters in 2010, county supervisors became limited to two terms of four years. The proposition did not immediately affect incumbent supervisors, whose current and previous terms did not count.

== Members ==
In accordance with Article II, Section 6 of the Constitution of California, members of the San Diego County Board of Supervisors are officially nonpartisan.

District	Supervisor	Party
1	Paloma Aguirre	Democratic
2	Joel Anderson	Republican
3	Terra Lawson-Remer	Democratic
4	Monica Montgomery Steppe	Democratic
5	Jim Desmond	Republican
