= Elfin Forest, California =

Unincorporated community in San Diego County, California, United States

- Unincorporated community Census-designated place
- Location in California Elfin Forest, California (the United States)
- Coordinates: 33°04′43.6″N 117°10′36.9″W
- Country: United States
- State: California
- County: San Diego County

Area
  - Total: 2.025 sq mi (5.24 km^{2})
  - Land: 2.025 sq mi (5.24 km^{2})
  - Water: 0 sq mi (0 km^{2})
- Elevation: 679 ft (207 m)

Population (2020)
  - Total: 600
  - Density: 300/sq mi (110/km^{2})
- Time zone: UTC-8 (Pacific)
  - Summer (DST): UTC-7 (PDT)
- GNIS feature ID: 2813412

Elfin Forest is an unincorporated foothill residential community and census-designated place (CDP) in San Diego County, California, United States. As of the 2020 census, Elfin Forest had a population of 600. The community is located southwest of Escondido and according to the USGS it is located in the Escondido ZIP code of 92029. It borders the rural, unincorporated town of Harmony Grove to the northeast, San Marcos to the north and west, Olivenhain to the southwest, and Rancho Santa Fe to the south.

== Hiking ==
The 750-acre Elfin Forest Recreational Reserve is a family hike through an ecological preserve. The Way Up trail climbs up to 1200 ft elevation and has many tributary trails. The Escondido Creek marks the trailhead. The main trail is 1.6 miles long and meanders up a wall then leads up to numerous trails of varying difficulties. There is a well-marked botanical trail describing the various plant life in the area. The hike passes next to Olivenhain Dam and can also extend about 9 miles one way over the mountain to Lake Hodges.

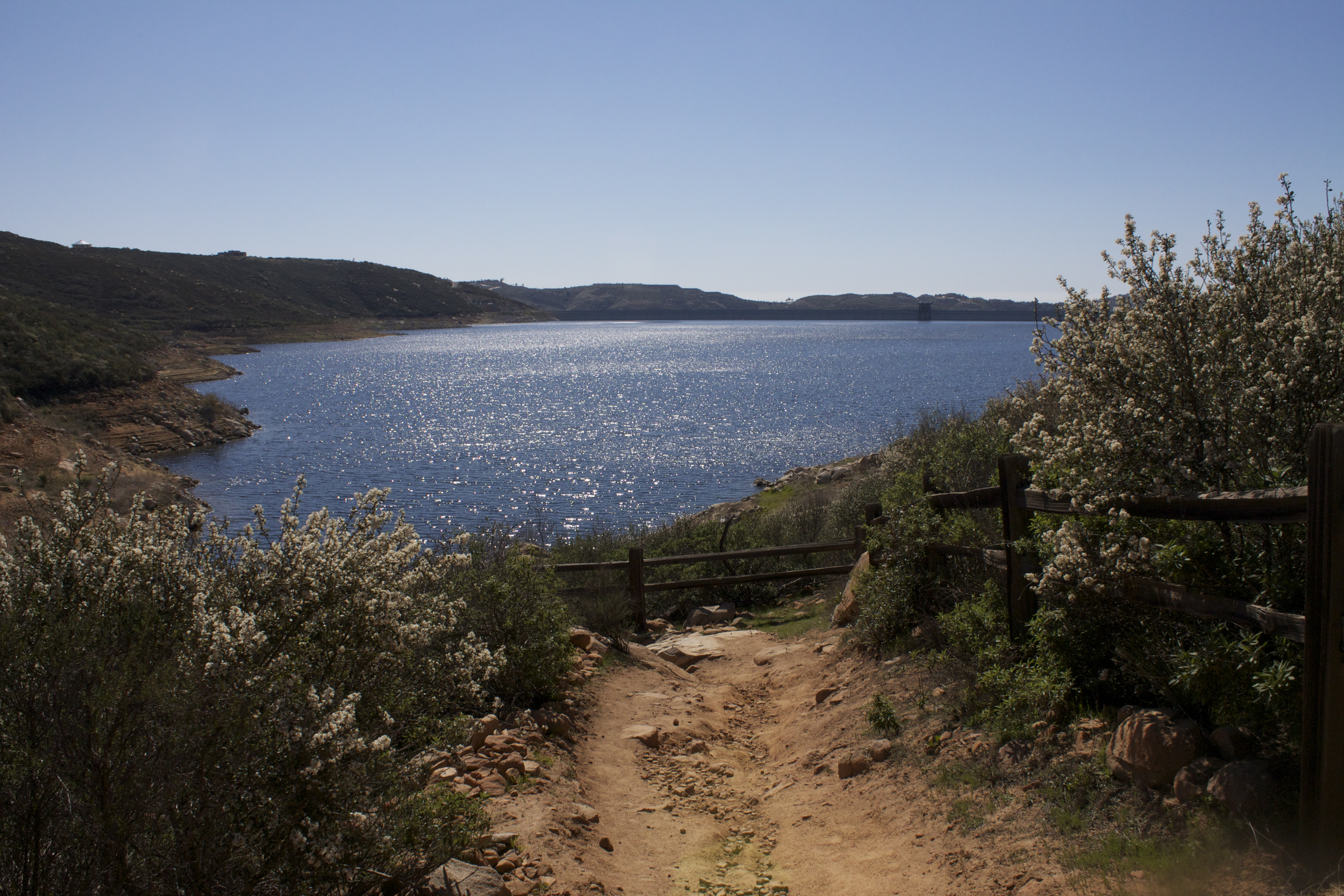
Olivenhain Dam & Reservoir view from an Elfin Forest trail

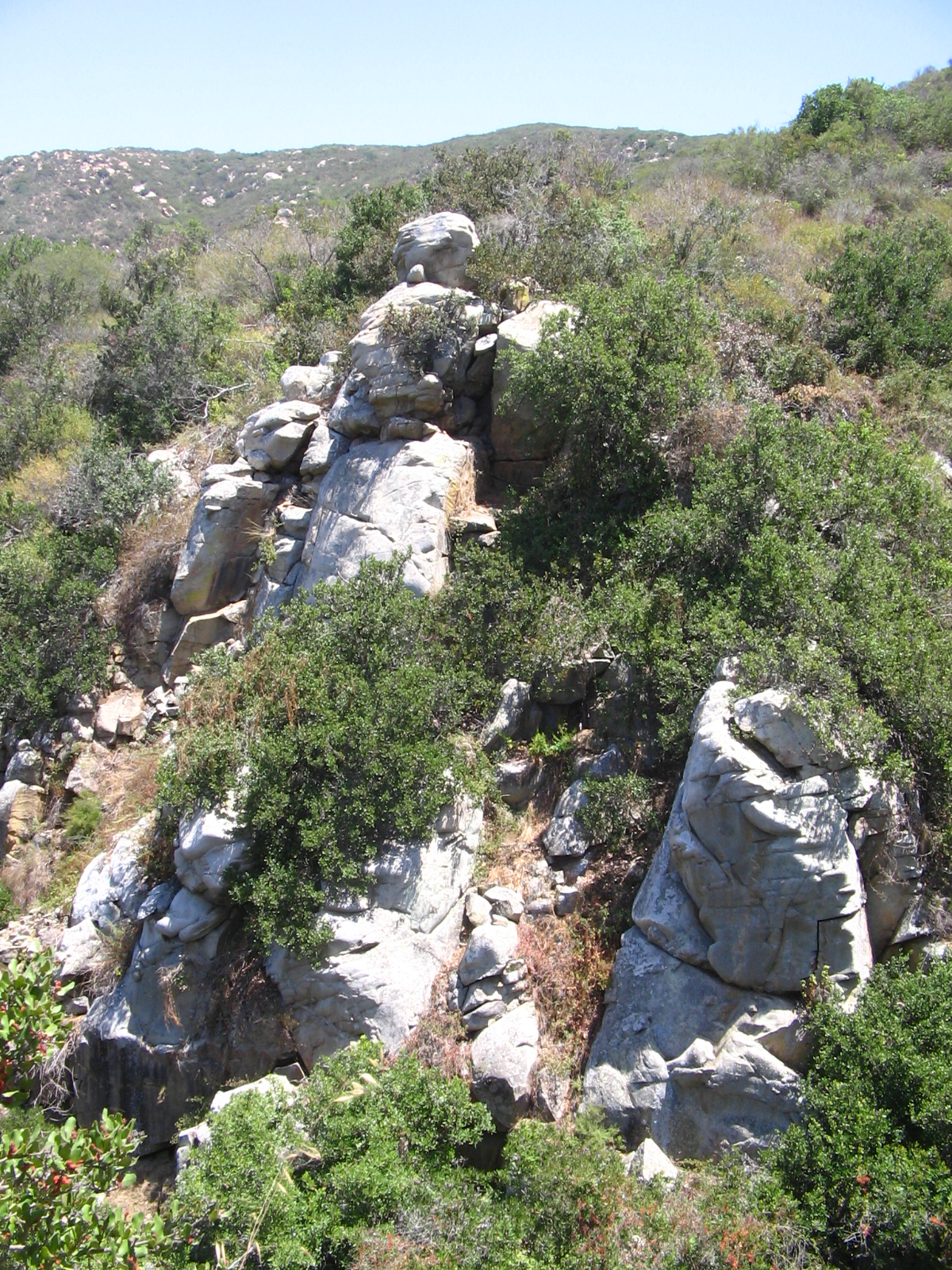
Rock ledge

== Flora and fauna ==
Elfin Forest is one of the terms used by naturalists to describe the chaparral vegetation which formerly covered much of coastal Southern California. It is variously known as California coastal sage and chaparral ecoregion, bush-forest, elfin-wood, heath-scrub. The coastal scrub supports many plants and animals, including the endangered gnatcatcher. The Elfin Forest valley contains one of the largest area leftover virgin coastal scrub in Southern California. Elfin forest is also a type of Dwarf forest in coastal California and elsewhere.

== Demographics ==
Historical population
Census	Pop.	Note	%±
2020	600		—
U.S. Decennial Census; 1860–1870 1880-1890; 1900 1910 1920; 1930 1940 1950; 1960 1970 1980; 1990 2000 2010; 2020

Elfin Forest first appeared as a census designated place in the 2020 U.S. census.

=== 2020 Census ===
Elfin Forest CDP, California – Racial and ethnic composition Note: the US Census treats Hispanic/Latino as an ethnic category. This table excludes Latinos from the racial categories and assigns them to a separate category. Hispanics/Latinos may be of any race.
Race / Ethnicity (NH = Non-Hispanic)	Pop 2020	% 2020
White alone (NH)	495	82.50%
Black or African American alone (NH)	8	1.33%
Native American or Alaska Native alone (NH)	1	0.17%
Asian alone (NH)	4	0.67%
Native Hawaiian or Pacific Islander alone (NH)	0	0.00%
Other race alone (NH)	6	1.00%
Mixed race or Multiracial (NH)	23	3.83%
Hispanic or Latino (any race)	63	10.50%
Total	600	100.00%

== Education ==
Most of the CDP is in Rancho Santa Fe Elementary School District and San Dieguito Union High School District. A portion is in Escondido Union Elementary School District and Escondido Union High School District.
