= Paloma Aguirre =

American politician

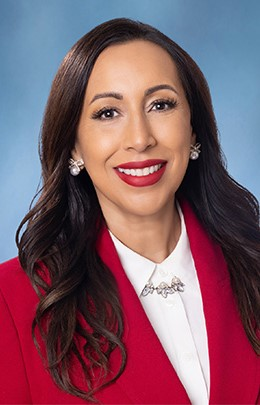

Member of the San Diego County Board of Supervisors from the 1st district
- Incumbent
- Assumed office July 22, 2025
- Preceded by: Nora Vargas

Mayor of Imperial Beach
- In office December 2022 – July 22, 2025
- Preceded by: Serge Dedina
- Succeeded by: Mitch McKay

Personal details
- Born: 1977 or 1978 (age 48–49) San Francisco, California, U.S.
- Party: Democratic
- Spouse: Delio
- Education: University of San Diego (BA); University of California, San Diego (MS)

Paloma Aguirre (born 1977/1978) is an American conservationist and politician serving as a member of the San Diego County Board of Supervisors since 2025, representing District 1.

A member of the Democratic Party, she previously served as the 19th mayor of Imperial Beach, California from 2022 to 2025 and as a member of the Imperial Beach city council from 2018 to 2022. She was the first Latina to hold either office.

== Personal life and education ==
Aguirre was born in San Francisco, California, to Mexican immigrant parents who waited tables. She lived in San Francisco until the age of eight, when she moved with her family back to their hometown of Puerto Vallarta, Mexico, where she graduated high school. Aguirre also taught herself to surf despite facing misogynistic comments, eventually becoming one of the top bodyboarders in the country.

Aguirre moved back to the United States in 2001 to further her education and bodyboarding career, winning several competitions and even competing in men's divisions. She eventually settled in Imperial Beach, California. Aguirre graduated from the University of San Diego with a bachelor's degree in psychology, becoming the first member of her family to graduate from college. She subsequently earned a certificate in nonprofit management from Brandman University and a master's degree in marine biodiversity and conservation from the Scripps Institution of Oceanography at the University of California, San Diego.

Aguirre resides in Imperial Beach with her husband Delio and their two dogs. She is openly bisexual.

== Early career ==
Aguirre began her career as a community organizer in South San Diego, helping low-income families deal with issues such as immigration, foreclosure, and predatory lending. She subsequently worked for a non-profit organization, Wildcoast, where she focused on addressing cross-border pollution of the Tijuana River Valley. For her environmental conservation work restoring the valley, Aguirre was honored as the 2014 Woman of the Year by state assemblywoman Lorena Gonzalez. In 2016, she stepped away from her non-profit work when she was selected for the NOAA Sea Grant Knauss fellowship in Washington, D.C., where she worked for Senator Cory Booker in developing legislation such as the Marine Debris Program Reauthorization Act. Aguirre and her husband considered staying in the capital, but were drawn back to Imperial Beach due to the issue of severe pollution in the area. She returned to Wildcoast as the coastal and marine director. In 2019, Aguirre left the post to lead the environment program at the International Community Foundation, overseeing funding for more than 80 conservation nonprofits across the continent.

Just prior to entering the Board of Supervisors race, Aguirre was elected as vice chair of the California Coastal Commission, which she had served on since 2021. She was also a co-founder of the Tijuana River Action Network, a board member of Four Walls International, and a member of Tijuana and Rosarito Clean Beaches Committees, as well as serving in different advisory roles for the state of California.

== Political career ==
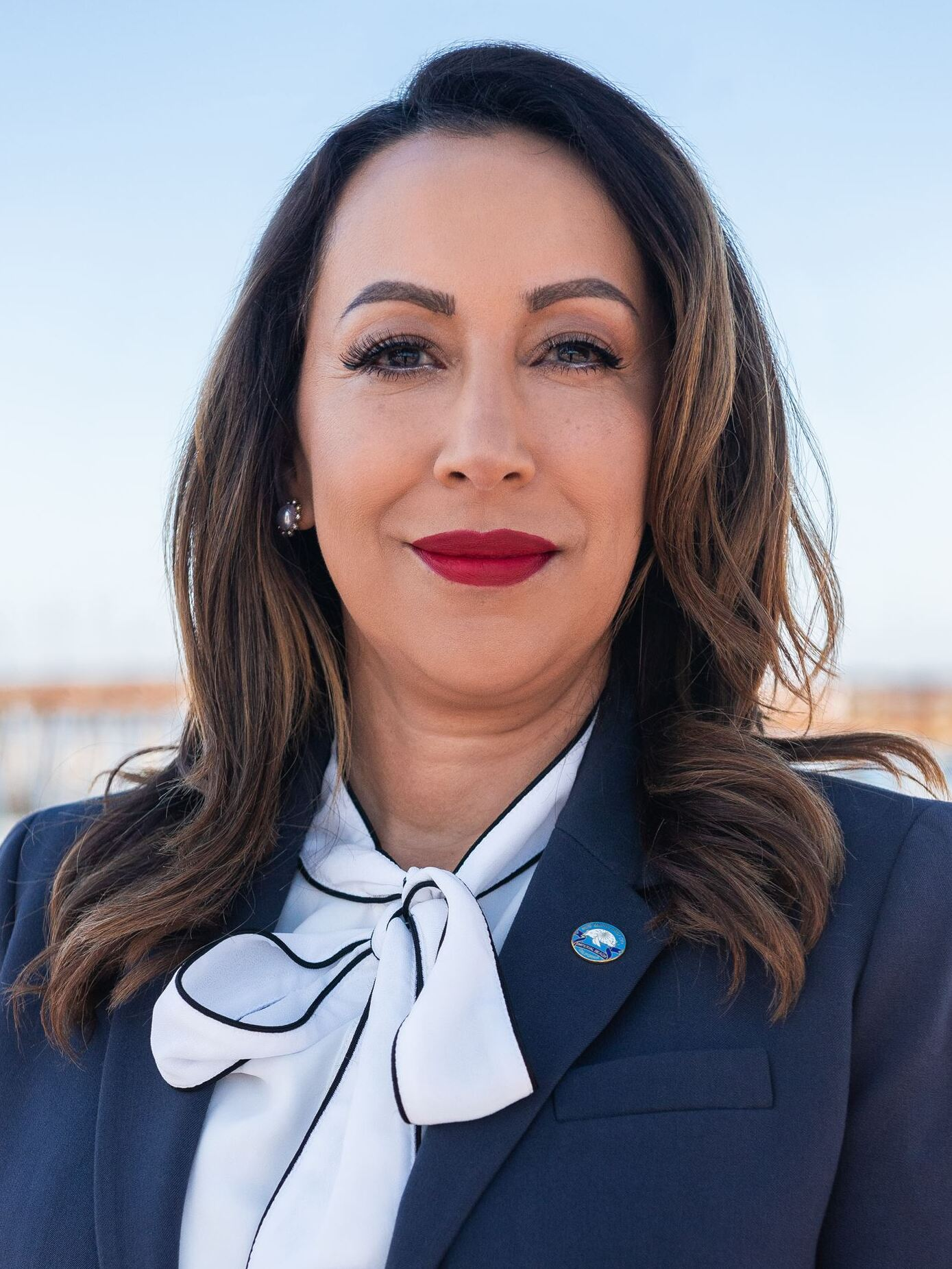
Paloma Aguirre as Mayor of Imperial Beach

I can’t surf Imperial Beach. I have to drive like 25 miles each way to go to the cleanest beach. The reason why I moved to Imperial Beach is — I don’t want to broadcast this — but it has the best waves in all of San Diego.

— Aguirre lamenting the pollution in Imperial Beach in 2024

On May 9, 2018, Aguirre announced her candidacy for a seat on the Imperial Beach City Council. She was inspired to run for office by Imperial Beach mayor and Wildcoast co-founder Serge Dedina, whom she worked under at the non-profit. During her campaign in mid-2018, Aguirre engaged in a "very public spat" with Francisco Vega de Lamadrid, then-Governor of Baja California, accusing him of lacking the political will to fix the binational issue of water pollution. She was elected to the seat in November, finishing second (to incumbent councilman Ed Spriggs) in an at-large race that elected two council members. Aguirre became the first Latino member of the city council, despite Latinos making up over half the city's population; she said she felt "incredibly proud" of the distinction. Less than two months prior, a lawyer had threatened to sue the city for the at-large election system, claiming it disenfranchised Latino voters.

On November 8, 2022, Aguirre was elected as the mayor of Imperial Beach with 45 percent of the vote, becoming the first Latino mayor in city history. To address the water pollution crisis, she pledged to pressure Mexican officials to fix an aging water treatment plant, to secure EPA funding, and to promote good relations with county public health officials. Aguirre spent "much of her time in office seeking to wrangle money and other resources" to fix the sewage crisis and received praise for bringing both national attention and funding to the issue. She was a 2024 presidential elector for Kamala Harris.

=== 2025 San Diego County Board of Supervisors ===
On December 30, 2024, Aguirre announced her campaign to fill the District 1 seat vacated by Nora Vargas, who announced that she would not take the oath of office for a second term on the San Diego County Board of Supervisors. During her announcement, she urged the EPA to designate the Tijuana River Valley as a Superfund site. Aguirre later wrote a letter to EPA administrator Lee Zeldin to reiterate the request, which was quickly denied. However, in March 2025, she helped secure $156 million in federal funding to repair a critical wastewater treatment plant in San Ysidro.

Within a week from her announcement, Aguirre was endorsed by more than 20 local elected leaders. She was described as the most progressive candidate in the race and went on to receive the endorsement of U.S. Representative Mike Levin, State Senator Steve Padilla, the San Diego County Democratic Party, and various labor unions, as well as organizations such as the California Working Families Party, Equality California, the LGBTQ+ Victory Fund, and the local Sierra Club. On March 7, Aguirre received the endorsement of The San Diego Union-Tribune editorial board, which called her "the right candidate at the right time" and praised her for being "the most powerful and cogent advocate" in regards to the water pollution issue.

Aguirre opposes the Trump mass deportations, saying: "We can keep our streets safe without losing our compassion or common sense." She pointed to her experience as a mayor of a border city and as a first-generation Mexican-American, stating: "neither I nor my constituents are falling for the cable news hysteria." Aguirre criticized his "harmful tariffs" as well as the pause on federal grants.

Aguirre won the run-off election against Republican candidate John McCann and was sworn in at the Board's meeting on July 22.
