= Terra Lawson-Remer =

American politician (born 1978)

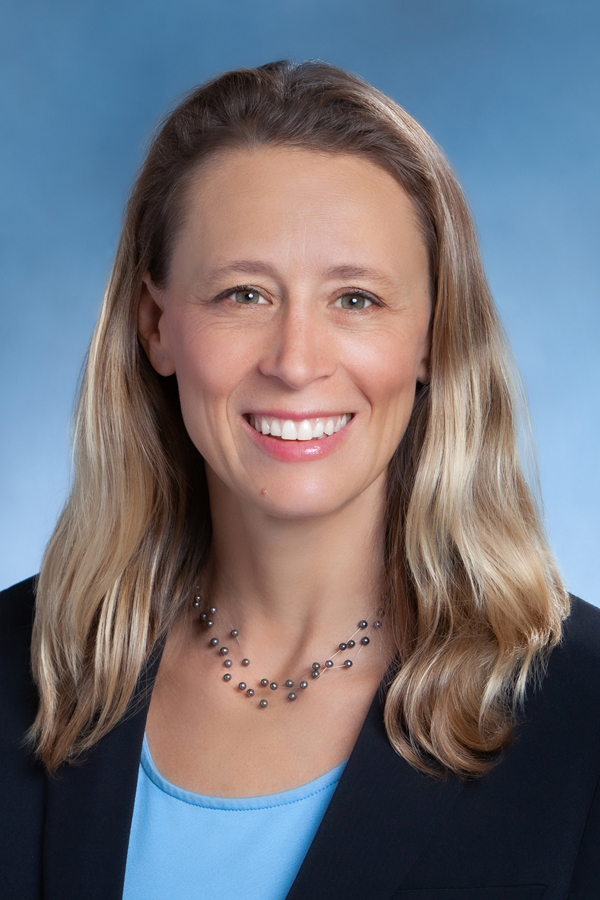
- Official portrait, 2021

Chair of the San Diego County Board of Supervisors
- Incumbent
- Assumed office July 22, 2025
- Preceded by: Nora Vargas

Vice Chair of the San Diego County Board of Supervisors
- In office January 10, 2023 – July 22, 2025
- Preceded by: Nora Vargas
- Succeeded by: Monica Montgomery Steppe

Member of the San Diego County Board of Supervisors for the 3rd district
- Incumbent
- Assumed office January 4, 2021
- Preceded by: Kristin Gaspar

Personal details
- Born: Terra Eve Lawson-Remer; July 1978 (age 48) San Diego, California, U.S.
- Party: Democratic
- Children: 1
- Parents: Shari Lawson; Larry Remer
- Education: Yale University (BA); New York University (JD, PhD)
- Awards: Grawemeyer Award (2019)
- Website: www.terralawsonremer.org

Terra Eve Lawson-Remer (/ˈtɛrə ˈlɔːsʌn ˈriːmɜːr/ TERR-ə LAW-suhn REE-mur; born July 1978) is an American educator and politician serving as chair of the San Diego County Board of Supervisors since 2025. A member of the Democratic Party, she previously served as vice chair of the body from 2023 to 2025, and has represented District 3 on the board since 2021.

Born in San Diego, Lawson-Remer grew up in the Mission Hills neighborhood and attended La Jolla High School. She graduated from Yale University with a bachelor's degree in ethics, politics, and economics in 2000, later attending New York University, where she received a Juris Doctor and Doctor of Philosophy. After graduation, Lawson-Remer worked for the World Bank and the United States Treasury Department during the Barack Obama administration. She then served as a professor at the New School and the University of California, San Diego, teaching public policy.

In 2020, Lawson-Remer ran for the San Diego County Board of Supervisors, defeating Republican incumbent Kristin Gaspar. Her victory shifted control of the Board of Supervisors from Republican to Democratic for the first time in decades.

== Early life ==
Terra Eve Lawson-Remer was born in July 1978 in San Diego, California. Her father, Larry Remer, was born in Montclair, New Jersey, to a Jewish family and worked as an investigative journalist who would become a political consultant later in his career. Lawson-Remer's mother, Shari Lawson, worked as a lawyer. Her parents met each other while organizing protests in opposition to the Vietnam War and eventually married in July 1977 with Earl Ben Gilliam, a San Diego County Superior Court judge, officiating their marriage.

Lawson-Remer's paternal grandparents were Herbert and Beverly Remer. Herbert owned a company that imported goods mostly from Switzerland and Scandinavia and served in the Pacific Ocean theater of World War II as part of the United States Navy. Meanwhile, Beverly was a schoolteacher in the Bronx who worked toward desegregating the city's schools. Lawson-Remer's maternal grandfather, Frank Lawson, served in the United States Marine Corps and was stationed at Camp Pendleton and killed in action during the Korean War in 1950. Lawson-Remer has a sister named Alexa.

Lawson-Remer grew up in Mission Hills and graduated from La Jolla High School in 1996. In 2000, Lawson-Remer graduated from Yale University with a bachelor's degree in ethics, politics, and economics. She later attended New York University, where she received a Juris Doctor in 2006 and a Doctor of Philosophy in political economy in 2010.

== Early career and activism ==
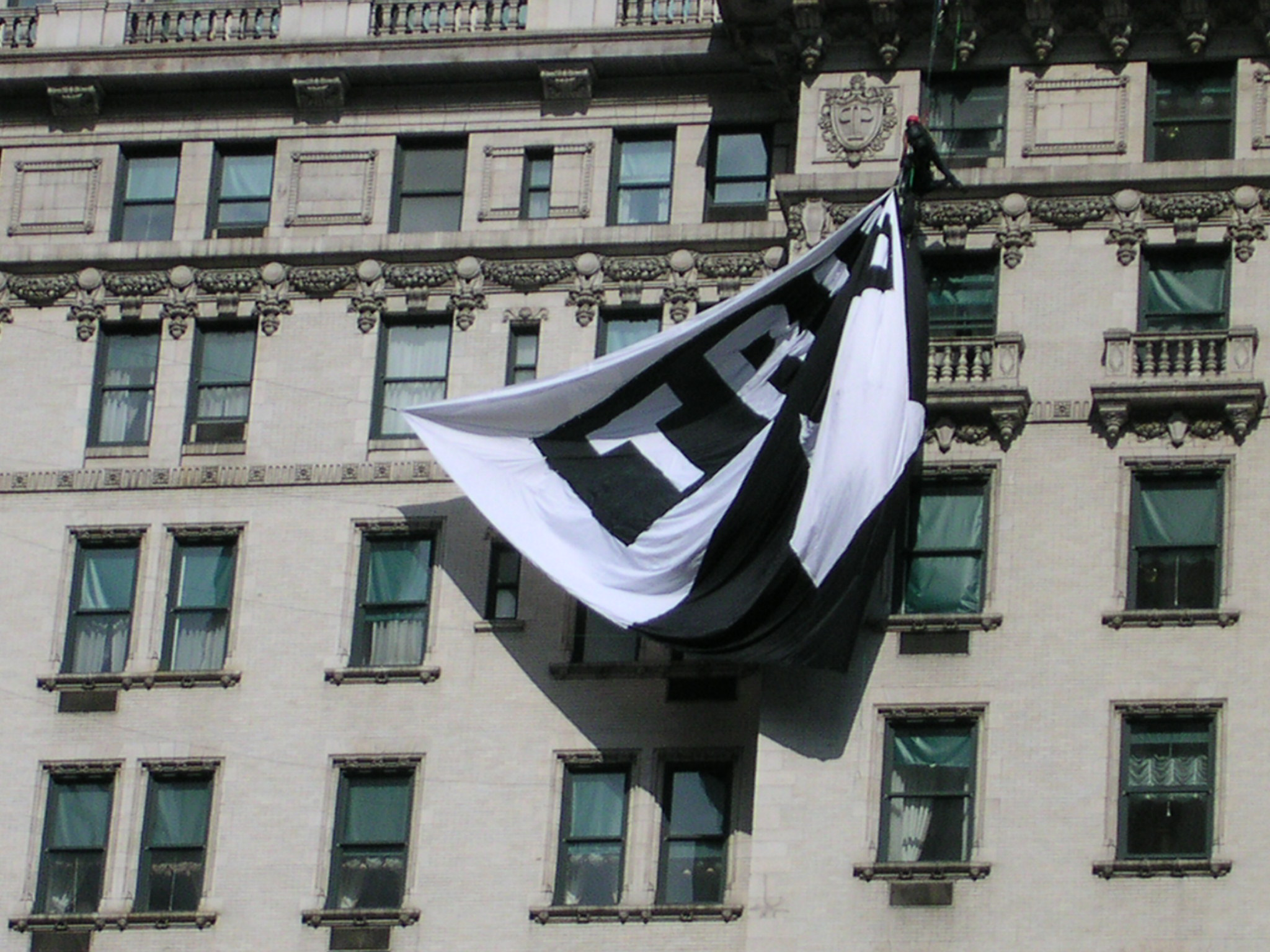
Lawson-Remer rappelling Plaza Hotel in a protest against the Republican National Convention, August 26, 2004

While president of her high school class in 1994, Lawson-Remer participated in a student walkout in opposition to Proposition 187, a ballot measure related to illegal immigration in California. Her involvement in the walkout prompted the school administrators to strip Lawson-Remer of her class presidency. In 1999, Lawson-Remer protested against a World Trade Organization meeting in Seattle, resulting in police arresting her. Lawson-Remer was one of nearly 14,000 law students in 2003 who submitted an amicus curiae in Grutter v. Bollinger, voicing support for affirmative action in college admissions.

On August 26, 2004, Lawson-Remer participated in Operation Sybil, a New York protest against the upcoming Republican National Convention, rappelling the Plaza Hotel to place a sign in opposition to president George W. Bush. New York police arrested her and several other co-organizers, charging them with felony and misdemeanor charges of assault, reckless endangerment, and criminal trespass. Lawson-Remer said Bush and vice president Dick Cheney were "taking [the country] in the wrong direction" and accused them of deception on the Iraq War, healthcare, and the economy.

Lawson-Remer worked for Amnesty International, PlaNet Finance on behalf of the World Bank, and as a senior advisor in the U.S. Treasury Department during the Barack Obama administration. She also taught public policy as a professor at The New School and the University of California, San Diego. In 2014, Lawson-Remer appeared in an episode of Vice to discuss the effects of the resource curse in Papua New Guinea. Along with 15 other applicants, Lawson-Remer applied to the Encinitas City Council in 2017, hoping to fill a seat left vacant after Catherine Blakespear became the city's mayor. In 2017–2018, Lawson-Remer was a fellow at Stanford University's Center for Advanced Study in the Behavioral Sciences and the Berggruen Institute. She led the Flip the 49th campaign to defeat Republican U.S. representative Darrell Issa in California's 49th district in 2018.

In 2019, Lawson-Remer received the Grawemeyer Award from the University of Louisville alongside Sakiko Fukuda-Parr and Susan Randolph for their book entitled Fulfilling Social and Economic Rights, which made a "significant contribution to world order" by "inform[ing] domestic and international policies, aid[ing] in the work of non-governmental organizations and provid[ing] a way to evaluate performance in a truly comparative perspective."

== San Diego County Board of Supervisors ==
=== 2020 election ===
On January 28, 2019, Lawson-Remer announced her candidacy in the third district of the San Diego County Board of Supervisors, contending for a seat held by conservative Republican Kristin Gaspar. In June 2019, Lawson-Remer received the endorsement of SEIU Local 221, the largest labor union in San Diego County. Escondido Mayor Paul McNamara withdrew his endorsement of Escondido City Councilwoman Olga Diaz, a fellow Democrat, on December 3, 2019, to support Lawson-Remer's campaign. On December 24, 2019, San Diego County Superior Court Judge Timothy Taylor required Lawson-Remer to revise her title in her ballot description, in which she indicated she was an attorney. However, because the State Bar of California did not license her, Lawson-Remer cannot refer to herself as an attorney without indicating the state where she has a license, which was New York in her case.

Democratic U.S. representative Juan Vargas, a friend of Lawson-Remer's father, endorsed her campaign to become a county supervisor in January 2020. In the March 2020 primary election, Lawson-Remer defeated Diaz to move on to the general election against Gaspar. After the election, San Diego Association of Governments executive director Hasan Ikhrata made the highest possible campaign donation to Lawson-Remer. Between February 16 through June 30, 2020, Lawson-Remer received more campaign contributions than Gaspar.

Several months before the November election, Lawson-Remer received a deluge of endorsements from California Democratic politicians hoping to flip the Republican-held seat, including governor Gavin Newsom, State Senate president pro tempore Toni Atkins, and San Diego county supervisor Nathan Fletcher. In October, Lawson-Remer received the endorsement of The San Diego Union-Tribune editorial board, who endorsed her Republican opponent in 2016. An October 2020 Voice of San Diego poll showed that 42% of likely voters would vote or leaned in favor of voting for Lawson-Remer, as opposed to 31% for Gaspar, whose vocal support for Donald Trump undermined her chances of reelection.

On October 12, 2020, Lawson-Remer challenged Gaspar in a KUSI debate, and she went on to defeat her Republican opponent on November 3 to shift the balance of power of the San Diego County Board of Supervisors in favor of the Democrats. Heading into the election, the Republicans held a 4–1 majority in the Board of Supervisors, ending up as a 3–2 Democratic majority afterward, establishing Democratic control for the "first time in at least a generation," according to the Voice of San Diego. Lawson-Remer's victory ensured simultaneous Democratic control of the San Diego mayor's office, the San Diego City Council, and the San Diego County Board of Supervisors.

=== 2024 election ===
Former San Diego Mayor Kevin Faulconer challenged Lawson-Remer for the seat in an attempt to flip the partisan control of the Board of Supervisors. Lawson-Remer handily won re-election in the general election.

=== Tenure ===
After winning the election, Lawson-Remer became a member of the Board of Supervisors after being sworn in on January 4, 2021. The swearing-in ceremony occurred between 10 and 11 a.m., with Lawson-Remer sworn in after Nora Vargas and Joel Anderson. Lawson-Remer recited the oath of office with state Senator Toni Atkins and Judge M. Margaret McKeown of the United States Court of Appeal for the Ninth Circuit, which was done so virtually due to the ongoing COVID-19 pandemic.

== Political positions ==
Lawson-Remer supported lifting San Diego County's ban on businesses selling recreational cannabis in unincorporated areas, favoring market regulation instead of prohibitive policy. On climate change, she wanted to put together a plan that involved adopting a Community Choice Aggregation program setting a timeline for 90% clean energy, support for mitigation banking, and other initiatives. Lawson-Remer suggested providing incentives for developers building affordable housing as a means to resolve San Diego's housing crisis. She supported the implementation of smart growth to curb sprawl. Lawson-Remer said that racism in the United States continued to be a problem locally and nationally. She opposed outsourcing the jail medical and mental health services of the San Diego County Sheriff's Department. Lawson-Remer criticized San Diego County's response to the COVID-19 pandemic, seeing the county as unready to handle outbreaks.

On the United States' investment in multilateral development banks, Lawson-Remer supported continued investment in these financial institutions on the basis that such investment develops and maintains national security. She argued that the G20 lacked legitimacy as an international actor because of issues surrounding the institution's transparency and accountability, believing that the G20 needed greater involvement of the people whose policies they affect.

== Personal life ==
Lawson-Remer resides in Encinitas, California, where she raises her daughter Eeva Kai as a single mother. Lawson-Remer is non-binary and pansexual. Explaining why she became a politician, Lawson-Remer cited Hillary Clinton's loss in the 2016 United States presidential election.

== Electoral history ==
2020 San Diego County Board of Supervisors primary election for the third district
Candidate	Votes	%
Kristin Diane Gaspar (incumbent)	72,598	42.82
Terra Lawson-Remer	52,899	31.20
Olga Diaz	44,063	25.99

2020 San Diego County Board of Supervisors general election for the third district
Candidate	Votes	%
Terra Lawson-Remer	176,594	58.12
Kristin Diane Gaspar (incumbent)	127,259	41.88

=== 2024 ===
2024 San Diego County Board of Supervisors District 3 general election
Party	Candidate	Votes	%
Democratic	Terra Lawson-Remer	178,781	57.0
Nonpartisan	Kevin Faulconer	134,991	43.0
Total votes		313,772	100

== Publications ==
- Fukuda-Parr, Sakiko; Lawson-Remer, Terra; Randolph, Susan (January 2, 2015). Fulfilling Social and Economic Rights (1st ed.). Oxford University Press. ISBN 978-0199735518.
