= Lincoln Acres, California =

Unincorporated community in California, United States

Lincoln Acres
- Unincorporated community
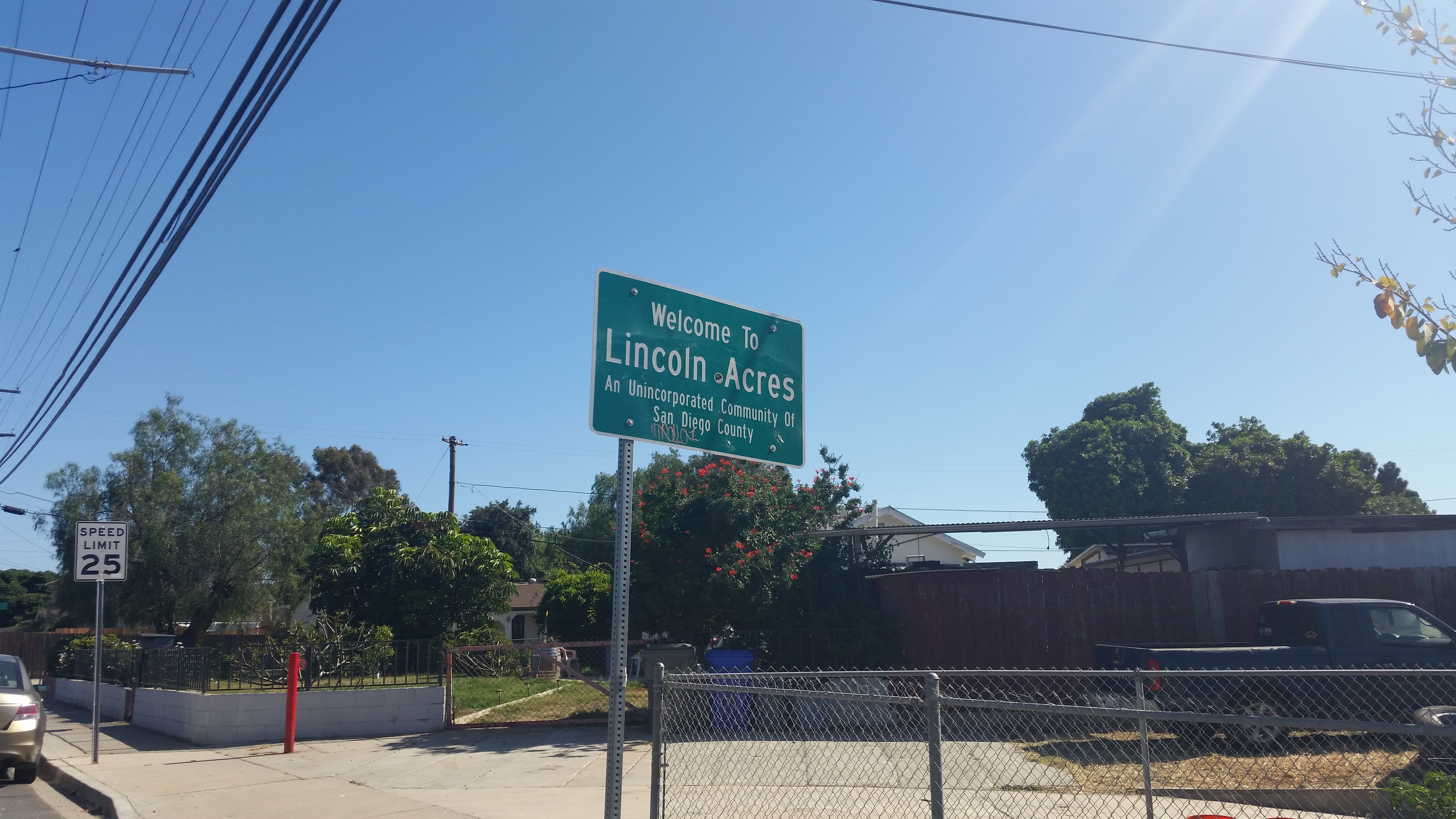
- Community sign

- Location in California Location in the United States
- Coordinates: 32°40′03″N 117°04′22″W
- Country: United States
- State: California
- County: San Diego

Population
  - Total: ~2,100

Lincoln Acres is an unincorporated community of San Diego County located wholly within the boundaries of the incorporated city of National City. It has a population of approximately 2,100 residents, and residents may keep livestock. Lincoln Acres has a fire station and library. The community relies on the San Diego County Sheriff's Office to provide police protection. Sheriff Deputies from the Imperial Beach station police the neighborhood. The United States Postal Service once listed the zip code 91947 as being located within Lincoln Acres for P.O. Box use, however the post office has since closed and residents receive mail under the zip code 91950. The community is in area code 619.

== History ==
Lincoln Acres was first settled during the Great Depression, mainly by farmers from the Midwest, to have small farms. It was named after Abraham Lincoln. Over time the farms became residential homes, and the population became mostly Mexican Americans. During World War II, there was one combat casualty from Lincoln Acres, Jerry Lee O'Hagen. In 1967, there was an unsuccessful attempt to annex Lincoln Acres into National City for zoning and sewer system purposes. In 1981, the community was considered as a potential location for adult businesses displaced by redevelopment of downtown National City to relocate. By 1975, the community had largely expanded to its limits, and only saw an 11% growth of population from 1975 to 1995. In 2019, a county commissioned approved the annexation of a quarter acre, adjacent to the Interstate 805 and California State Route 54 interchange, of Lincoln Acres into the City of National City.

== Significant organizations and properties ==
=== La Vista Cemetery ===
The largest plot of land in Lincoln Acres is filled by the La Vista Cemetery. The cemetery has a large section that is considered an endowed cemetery, meaning money is set aside for regular maintenance and upkeep, and a non-endowed side, known as Rest Haven, where no money is set aside for maintenance, and therefore the families of those buried there are responsible for maintaining their grave sites. This means that in the Rest Haven side, there are tilted headstones and old, off-kilter wooden crosses marking the graves. People construct their own headstones for the inexpensive plots, creating a personal, individual experience for family and friends of those interred there.

=== Library ===
The first library in the community began in 1940. Lincoln Acres is served by a branch of the San Diego County Library system, and the previous building was originally built in 1945. It was purchased from the Civil Conservation Corps in Vista, and moved to its final location in 1961. At the beginning of construction of the new library building, the branch was the smallest in the County Library system. On August 6, 2010, ground was broken for a new library which would be more than three times larger than the old location. It opened in 2013, and tripled the size of the branch from its 854 square feet original size. It includes a reading room named for a late volunteer of the library, who was killed in Chula Vista in 2007; a scholarship is also awarded in his name yearly to a child within the community. After it was completed, Chicano Park muralist Sal Barajas worked with members of the community to create a mural on the new building.

=== Lower Sweetwater Fire Protection District ===
While Lincoln Acres relies on the County of San Diego for governmental services, there is one elected body that is exclusive to Lincoln Acres; the Lower Sweetwater Fire Protection District. In 1945 the fire district was formed, and a firehouse was erected next to the site of the library. As of 2008, the fire district owns no fire trucks nor has any firefighters on its payroll. This special district has a board of three members who have the sole task of administering a $155,473-a-year contract with the National City Fire Department, which provides fire protection to the community. The contract is paid for by Lincoln Acres landowners' property taxes.

After the November 2006 elections, only one person was currently serving on the fire district board: Butch Fimpel. On January 9, 2007, the County Board of Supervisors appointed Mary Martinez to the board. Martinez had been previously serving on the board, but did not run for re-election in November 2006. The third remaining seat on the board remains vacant. The board meets monthly and the positions are unpaid, though in the past the board members were paid $20 per meeting.

In 2002 there was an attempt to dissolve the Lower Sweetwater Fire Protection District, "Proposition R," but the measure failed when 156 Lincoln Acres residents voted against dissolution, defeating the measure by 62%. Only 29% of the community's 882 registered voters went to the polls that day, but many of those who did vote feared dissolution of the fire district would lead to the community's annexation to National City.
