= Nora Vargas =

Member of San Diego County Board of Supervisors

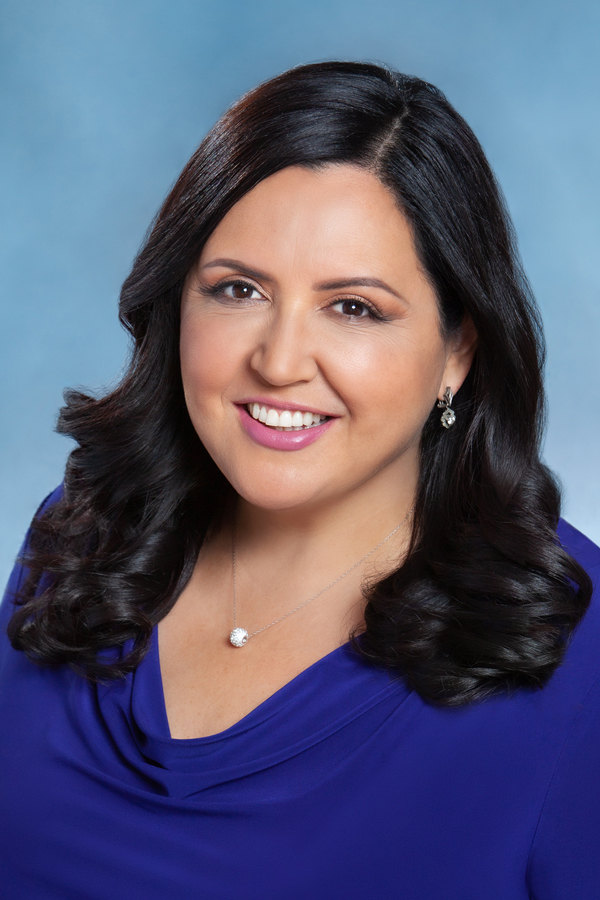
- Official portrait, 2021

Chair of the San Diego County Board of Supervisors
- In office January 10, 2023 – January 6, 2025
- Preceded by: Nathan Fletcher
- Succeeded by: Terra Lawson-Remer

Vice Chair of the San Diego County Board of Supervisors
- In office January 5, 2021 – January 9, 2023
- Preceded by: Nathan Fletcher
- Succeeded by: Terra Lawson-Remer

Member of the San Diego County Board of Supervisors from the 1st district
- In office January 4, 2021 – January 6, 2025
- Preceded by: Greg Cox
- Succeeded by: Paloma Aguirre

Personal details
- Born: Tijuana, Mexico
- Party: Democratic
- Education: University of San Francisco (BA); Claremont Graduate University

Nora E. Vargas is an American politician who served on the San Diego County Board of Supervisors from 2021 to 2025, representing District 1. A member of the Democratic Party, she served as chair of the body from 2023 to 2025 and was the first immigrant and the first Latina to serve in the body.

After being re-elected in the 2024 election with 62.5% of the vote, Vargas announced that she would not be taking the oath of office for a second term. She formally resigned from the board of supervisors on January 6, 2025.

== Early life and education ==
Vargas was born in Tijuana, Mexico, and grew up in southern San Diego County, California. She graduated from Montgomery High School and attended Southwestern College before matriculating to the University of San Francisco, where she earned a Bachelor's degree in political science in 1993. She later completed graduate work in women's studies at Claremont Graduate University.

She has worked at various non-profit organizations and was vice president of community and governmental relations at Planned Parenthood of the Pacific Southwest. Governor Jerry Brown appointed her to the California State Teachers' Retirement System in 2015 and she served on the Southwestern College board.

== San Diego County Board of Supervisors ==
Vargas was elected to succeed longtime District 1 Supervisor Greg Cox in 2020, defeating state Senator Ben Hueso in the general election. The district includes Chula Vista, Coronado, and National City as well as the San Diego communities of Barrio Logan, San Ysidro, and Otay. She was sworn in on January 4, 2021, and selected to be vice chair of the board. Vargas was elected chair of the board on January 9, 2023, and re-elected as chair on January 9, 2024. Vargas was re-elected to another term in November 2024. On December 20, she announced that she would not be taking the oath of office for a second term in January 2025 due to "personal safety and security reasons."

=== Electoral history ===
2020 San Diego County Board of Supervisors primary election for the first district
Candidate	Votes	%
Ben Hueso	32,263	29.29
Nora Vargas	20,767	18.86
Rafa Castellanos	17,934	16.28
Sophia Rodriguez	16,634	15.10
Alex Galicia	13,232	12.01
Henry Belisle	4,035	3.66
Camilo Marquez	2,679	2.43
Tony Villafranca	2,591	2.35
Total votes	110,135	100.00

2020 San Diego County Board of Supervisors general election for the first district
Candidate	Votes	%
Nora Vargas	131,783	56.58
Ben Hueso	101,133	43.42
Total votes	232,916	100.00
