= Nathan Fletcher =

Member of San Diego County Board of Supervisors (born 19476)

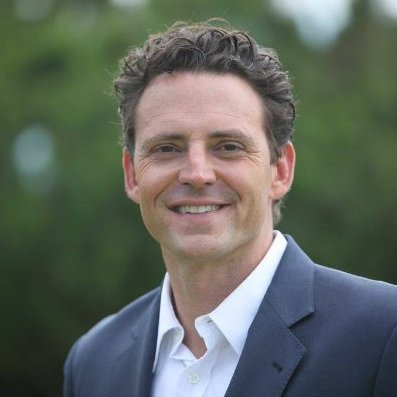
- Fletcher in 2013

Member of the San Diego County Board of Supervisors for the 4th district
- In office January 7, 2019 – May 15, 2023
- Preceded by: Ron Roberts
- Succeeded by: Monica Montgomery Steppe

Chair of the San Diego County Board of Supervisors
- In office January 5, 2021 – January 9, 2023
- Preceded by: Greg Cox
- Succeeded by: Nora Vargas

Member of the California State Assembly for the 75th district
- In office December 1, 2008 – November 30, 2012
- Preceded by: George Plescia
- Succeeded by: Marie Waldron

Personal details
- Born: Nathan Blaine Fletcher; December 31, 1976 (age 49) Carson City, Nevada, US
- Party: Republican (until 2012); No party preference (2012–2013); Democratic (2013–present)
- Spouses: Mindy Tucker (m. 2003; div. 2015) Lorena Gonzalez (m. 2017)
- Children: 2
- Education: California Baptist University
- Occupation: Politician, educator, rancher, veterans advocate
- Website: Nathan Fletcher

Military service
- Allegiance: United States
- Branch/service: United States Marine Corps
- Years of service: 1997–2007
- Rank: Staff Sergeant
- Unit: United States Marine Corps Reserves
- Battles/wars: Iraq War; Global War on Terror
- Awards: 8: Combat Action Ribbon Airborne; Joint Service Commendation Medal; Navy and Marine Corps Achievement Medal (V); Iraq Campaign Medal; Global War on Terrorism Expeditionary Medal; Global War on Terrorism Service Medal; National Defense Service Medal; Selected Marine Corps Reserve Medal

Nathan Blaine Fletcher (born December 31, 1976) is an American cattle rancher, writer, strategic adviser, and United States Marine Corps combat veteran. He operates his family’s cattle ranch in Arkansas, publishes the newsletter No Better Yesterdays, and owns Arrow Advisors, a strategic advising firm.

Fletcher served in the Marine Corps from 1997 to 2007 as a counterintelligence and human intelligence specialist. He deployed to Iraq, Yemen, and the Horn of Africa. He was decorated for valor under enemy fire for his response to an ambush in Iraq. He also received the Combat Action Ribbon, Iraq Campaign Medal, Global War on Terrorism Expeditionary Medal, and Joint Service Commendation Medal, among other military decorations. He is a graduate of the U.S. Army Airborne Course and the Marine Corps Mountain Warfare Training Center.

Earlier in his career, Fletcher previously served two terms in the California State Assembly and was an elected member of the San Diego County Board of Supervisors, including serving as its chair. He also worked as an executive at Qualcomm and as a professor of practice in political science at the University of California, San Diego.^{[2]}

== Early life and education ==
Fletcher was born and spent the early years of his life in Carson City, Nevada. His parents divorced when he was two years old, and his mother Sherrie Morgan, moved with him to Smackover, Arkansas. There, she met and married Danny Farley, who worked at an International Paper factory. His biological father, Randy Fletcher, a former deputy sheriff, obtained a custody decree in Nevada. Randy Fletcher then drove to Arkansas, where he took Nathan from his mother and returned to Nevada with him. A Nevada judge granted custody to Randy Fletcher with visitation rights for Sherrie. Nathan describes his father as abusive and said this period of his life was "a living hell".

Fletcher was sent back to live with his mother when he was eight years old; he remained with her and Danny Farley for the rest of his childhood. He says that when he talks about his dad, he is referring to his stepfather Danny Farley, whom he counts as his only real father figure. His childhood and family background became an issue during his campaign for mayor, when opponents accused him of dishonesty because of apparent inconsistencies in talking about his father. He had tried to keep the details of his background private, but faced with the accusations, he and his mother gave an interview to KPBS in which they explained the apparent contradictions as resulting from the difference between his biological father and his stepfather.

He graduated from Smackover High School and moved to California, earning a Bachelor of Science in political science from California Baptist University.

== Career ==
After graduating from college, Fletcher worked for the International Republican Institute, a nongovernmental organization seeking to build and improve democracies around the world. This included time abroad working with non-governmental organizations in Myanmar, East Timor, Cambodia, and Serbia.

=== Military service ===
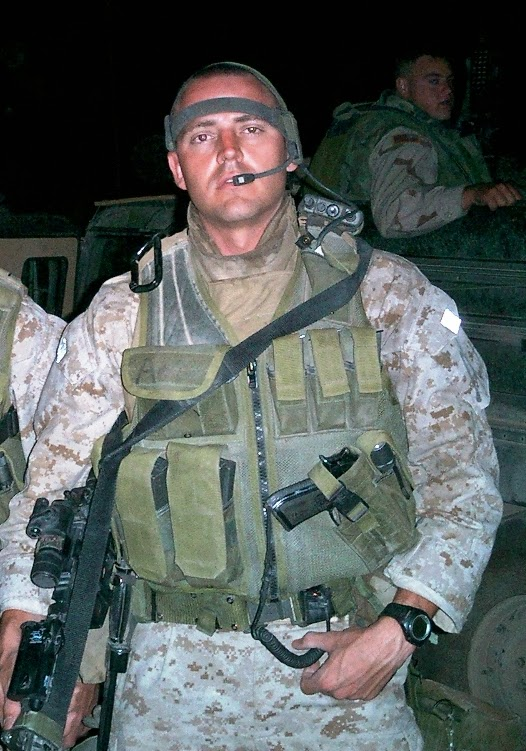
Fletcher served in Iraq in 2004.

Fletcher joined the United States Marine Corps as a reservist in 1997 and became an active-duty Marine in 2002. He served as a counterintelligence/human intelligence specialist. In 2007, he was honorably discharged, with the rank of staff sergeant. He is a graduate of the U.S. Army Airborne Course and Marine Corps Mountain Warfare Training Center.

In 2004, he served eight months in the Sunni Triangle region of Iraq. Among his awards from that tour of duty are the Navy–Marine Corps Achievement Medal with Combat "V" a combat distinguishing device, Combat Action Ribbon, and Iraqi Campaign Medal. He worked in the Horn of Africa on his final deployment and earning the Joint Service Commendation Medal and Global War on Terrorism Expeditionary Medal.

During his time in Iraq, Fletcher worked to build relationships with the native population, leading his supervisors to describe him as "compassionate and focused." On April 9, 2004, Fletcher and three other Marines fended off an enemy ambush when participating in a Quick Reaction Force to aid a VIP convoy. He was responsible for authorizing 150 intelligence reports, which amounted to 31 percent of the reports generated by the team of six Counter Intelligence Marines.

== Politics ==
=== District Director for United States Congress ===
Fletcher got his start in San Diego politics serving for two years as the district director for Republican Congressman Duke Cunningham. "But for most of that time, Fletcher didn’t work there. Fletcher was on active duty in the Marines," according to an investigative report by the Voice of San Diego published in 2012 on Fletcher's working relationship with the jailed former Congressman.

=== State Assembly ===
In 2008, he was elected to the Assembly representing the 75th Assembly District, still as a Republican, which includes the City of Poway, portions of Escondido, La Jolla, University City, Mira Mesa, Scripps Ranch, Rancho Bernardo, Rancho Peñasquitos, and Carmel Valley, and the communities of Fairbanks Ranch, and Rancho Santa Fe. He won with 52.2% of the vote. He was re-elected in 2010 with 60.5% of the vote.

In his first term, Fletcher had a number of pieces of legislation signed into law, including legislation relating to veterans, job creation, water infrastructure, and health care. He was chosen as one of two Republican Party whips in 2010.

As a legislator, he also sponsored Chelsea's Law, which toughened penalties and restrictions on violent sexual predators. On February 25, 2010, 17-year-old Chelsea King was murdered by John Albert Gardner when jogging at a local community park in Rancho Bernardo. Gardner was a registered sex offender at the time of the murder and later admitted to killing 14-year-old Amber DuBois in 2009. In response to the public outrage, Fletcher sponsored Chelsea's Law to prevent future tragedies by offering life without parole sentencing to criminals charged with violent sex offenses. The bill was signed into law by Gov. Arnold Schwarzenegger on September 10, 2010.

In May 2010, Fletcher gave an Assembly floor speech in support of California Senate Joint Resolution 9, which called upon Congress and the President to repeal the U. S. Armed Forces policy known as "Don't ask, don't tell" (DADT). Fletcher, a Marine Corps veteran who served in Iraq and other locations, was the first California Republican legislator to endorse ending this policy. His speech was described as "one of the most eloquent on the floor for some time."

That same year, Fletcher opposed AJR 15, the "Uniting American Families Act," that sought to "support the removal of legal barriers to immigration by permanent same-sex partners" and "allow gay and lesbian citizens to sponsor their partners for United States citizenship."

Fletcher was a proponent of implementing a Mandatory Single Sales Factor on out-of-state corporations that conduct business in California but operate outside the state. The legislation, supported by Gov. Jerry Brown, would have closed a loophole in the tax code and used the savings to offer tax incentives to local industries in order to spawn job creation in California. Fletcher's vote was instrumental in obtaining a two-thirds majority vote to guarantee the bill's passage in the Assembly during the final meeting of the 2011 legislative session. The bill, however, failed in the California State Senate.

Other notable legislation that Fletcher supported include the Corporate Tax and Middle-Class Scholarship Fund, Assembly Bill 877 Prohibiting Discrimination Against Transgendered Individuals, and the Foreclosure Reduction Act.

In 2012, Fletcher helped prevent a janitor's strike in San Diego by calling CEOs on behalf of workers to advocate for expanding health care coverage.

=== San Diego mayoral election ===
In June 2011, Fletcher announced his candidacy for the mayorship of San Diego. Fletcher started the race as a registered Republican. However, a few weeks after the local Republican Party endorsed his opponent Carl DeMaio, Fletcher announced he was leaving the Republican Party to become an independent. Fletcher ultimately came in third in the June 2012 primary and did not advance to the general election.

On August 20, 2013, Fletcher, now a Democrat, officially filed his intention to be a mayoral candidate with the City Clerk's Office—a day before a tentative agreement was reached for Mayor Bob Filner's resignation. Fletcher was endorsed by California Governor Jerry Brown and Attorney General Kamala Harris. However, in the election held November 19, 2013, he came in third with 24.3 percent of the vote and thus did not advance to the runoff election in February 2014. On November 20, he conceded and endorsed fellow Democrat David Alvarez.

=== Change of political parties ===
Fletcher departed from the Republican Party midway through his first mayoral campaign. He has said this was due to extreme partisan politics and to the party's shift away from his core values, not due to the local Republican Party endorsing his opponent. On May 4, 2013, Fletcher announced on his Facebook page that he was joining the Democratic Party. Fletcher was widely embraced by Democratic leaders, many of whom had been courting him for years to join the party.

=== San Diego County supervisor ===
In 2018 Fletcher ran for an open seat representing District 4 on the San Diego County Board of Supervisors. There were five candidates in the June primary, with the top two advancing to the November general election. Fletcher was the first-place finisher and former District Attorney Bonnie Dumanis placed second. He was the Democratic candidate for the seat and Dumanis was the Republican, though the election was officially nonpartisan. During the campaign Fletcher touted various endorsements including now President Joe Biden, former Governor Jerry Brown, then-Lieutenant Governor Gavin Newsom, the Sierra Club, labor unions, and the San Diego Democratic Party. Fletcher was also endorsed by the San Diego Union-Tribune, stating "We think the county needs a wake-up call, and Fletcher is far more likely to jolt it out of complacency." Fletcher won the general election, defeating Dumanis 67.37% to 32.63%.

Fletcher was appointed to the California Air Resources Board by Governor Newsom on January 28, 2019.

Fletcher was unanimously elected as Chair of the San Diego County Board of Supervisors on January 5, 2021. He successfully ran for reelection in 2022.

He also served as the board chair of the San Diego Metropolitan Transit System (MTS). In that capacity, he has voiced support for the extension of the San Diego Trolley to San Diego International Airport. He resigned as chair on March 28, 2023.

On February 6, 2023, he announced his candidacy for state senate. On March 26 he announced that he was "quitting his campaign for state Senate to focus on his fight with PTSD, trauma, and alcohol abuse".

In March 2023, former MTS employee Grecia Figueroa sued Nathan Fletcher, alleging sexual harassment and assault. Fletcher acknowledged consensual interactions but denied using force. He resigned from the San Diego County Board of Supervisors on May 15, 2023, shortly after the lawsuit became publice. In August 2025, a judge dismissed Figueroa's lawsuits against MTS and Fletcher, with the case against Fletcher dismissed with prejudice, citing issues concerning the handling and preservation of evidence.

== Non-political activities ==
=== Business ===
Following the end of his legislative term on December 2, 2012, Fletcher became a senior director of corporate development at Qualcomm. He said in a statement that his position would include developing global strategies for wireless health initiatives, mobile education, and the protection of intellectual property, but will not involve lobbying or government relations. His title was later changed to Global Strategic Initiatives, and in 2017, he announced he was leaving Qualcomm to dedicate more time to UCSD and community issues.

Fletcher also served as a television commentator for Fox 5 San Diego and paid contributor to San Diego Magazine.

=== Education ===
In January 2013, Fletcher was appointed as the first professor of practice (officially an adjunct professor) at the University of California, San Diego. He teaches classes in the department of political science, as well as mentoring and advising students and helping to develop public policy projects. Professor of Practice was a new, privately funded position at the university intended to "provide students with a deeper understanding of the practical application of a particular field of study and help promote the integration of academic scholarship with practical experience from applications professionals."

=== Political and community activities ===
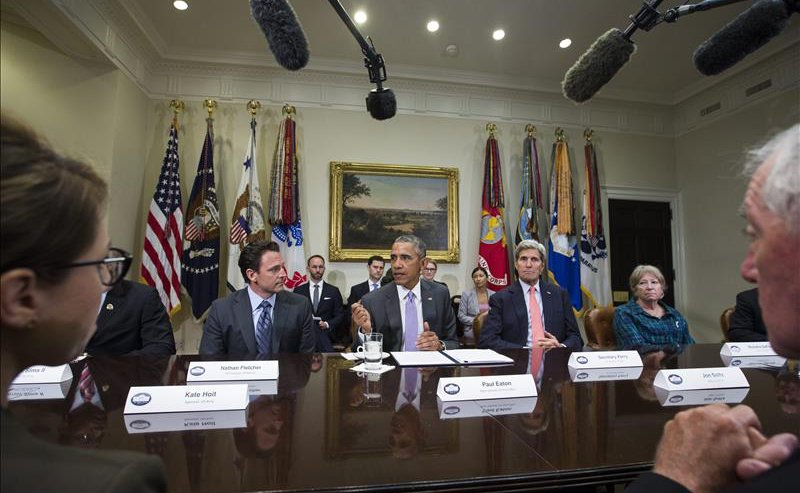
Nathan Fletcher met with President Obama, representing the Truman National Security Project, to discuss and support the 2015 Iran Nuclear Deal.

Fletcher remains politically active, by supporting Democratic candidates and progressive causes. He is a member of the national advisory board of Organizing for Action, the successor organization of President Barack Obama's 2012 re-election campaign. He is a member of the Statewide Leadership Council of the Public Policy Institute of California, and a member of the Aspen Institute Global Alliances Program Advisory Board. He is also a member of the National Advisory Board of the Truman National Security Project. He is a delegate of the California Democratic Party, member of San Diego Democratic Central Committee, was a 2016 delegate to the Democratic National Committee, and has been active in supporting Democratic candidates and causes such as efforts to raise the minimum wage. He also remains involved in efforts to ensure implementation of Chelsea's Law. He is a member of the World Economic Forum Global Agenda Council on Human Rights. He is a Kauffman Fellow and Tribeca Innovative Disruptive Fellow.

On March 13, 2013, Fletcher brought together law enforcement, community, business, labor, and faith-based leaders to form San Diegans United for Common Sense Immigration Reform. The coalition came to an agreement to advocate for a pathway to citizenship, reform to the immigrant visa system, smart border security, and basic human rights.

Fletcher has served on the board of directors for the Marine Corps Recruit Depot Historical Society, a member of the American Legion, life member of Veterans of Foreign Wars, member of the board of directors of the San Diego Opera, Executive Committee of CONNECT, Community Advisory Council for Voices for Children, and the San Diego Regional Advisory Council of the California League of Conservation Voters Education Fund.

In 2025, Fletcher registered as a California state lobbyist. His lobbying firm, Arrow Advisors, represents Veterans Exploring Treatment Solutions (VETS), a nonprofit organization that advocates for expanded access to psychedelic-assisted therapies for veterans with post-traumatic stress disorder and other mental health conditions. Fletcher serves as a senior adviser to VETS. He has spoken publicly about his experience with PTSD and about attending an ibogaine treatment retreat in Mexico facilitated by VETS. VETS credited Fletcher with a role in the passage of California Assembly Bill 1103, a 2025 law intended to accelerate research into psychedelic-assisted therapies, and he appeared alongside Gavin Newsom when the bill was signed in October 2025. According to state lobbying disclosures, VETS paid Arrow Advisors $1,400 for services between July and September 2025.

=== Writing ===
In 2017, while a professor of practice at UC San Diego, Fletcher wrote an opinion piece for The Washington Post arguing that veterans with combat-related mental health injuries, such as post-traumatic stress disorder, should be eligible for the Purple Heart.

In 2026, Fletcher began publishing essays through a Substack newsletter, No Better Yesterdays: Lessons in Hardship, Healing & Purpose. In the essay that gives the newsletter its title, published in April 2026, he writes about accepting responsibility for past mistakes and no longer trying to avoid public recognition.

On June 17, 2026, The War Horse, a nonprofit newsroom covering military service and veterans, published a first-person essay by Fletcher in its "Reflections" series. In it, he describes entering an inpatient trauma treatment facility in Arizona in 2023 after his resignation. There he took part in equine-assisted therapy and eye movement desensitization and reprocessing (EMDR) to address combat-related PTSD.

== Personal life ==
Fletcher is an Ironman Triathlete, marathon runner, alpine mountaineer, and mountain biker. In 2003, he married Mindy Tucker, who had served as campaign manager and deputy chief of staff for Governor Arnold Schwarzenegger. The couple has two adopted children. They separated on December 1, 2014, and filed for divorce in January 2015. In an NBC story they issued a joint statement, "We have made the best decision for our family. It is an amicable divorce, and we remain good friends. Our first priority is our children, and we hope that everyone will respect our privacy as we make this transition." In September 2015, Fletcher revealed that he had been dating Lorena Gonzalez, who served in the California State Assembly representing California's 80th District. They were married January 1, 2017.

In December 2018, Fletcher publicly acknowledged his 19-year-old son. Fletcher told the Voice of San Diego news site, "My 19-year-old son just came into our life, and it is wonderful."

At 4:00 AM on January 15, 2022, a "suspicious" fire broke out on the front of the couple's home. The family was awakened by smoke alarms and was able to leave the house through a side door. No one was injured, but the fire caused an estimated $36,000 in damage. A San Diego police investigation concluded that the fire was deliberately set and offered a $1,000 reward for help in identifying the arsonist.

Also, Fletcher divides his time between his family's ranch in Arkansas, where he works with cattle and horses, and a cabin in Big Bear Lake, California.

== Electoral History ==
=== California State Assembly ===
==== 2008 ====
2008 California State Assembly District 75 general election
Party	Candidate	Votes	%
Republican	Nathan Fletcher	98,758	52.2
Democratic	Daren Kasai	78,970	41.7
Libertarian	John Murphy	11,731	6.2
Total votes		189,459	100

==== 2010 ====
2010 California State Assembly District 75 general election
Party	Candidate	Votes	%
Republican	Nathan Fletcher (incumbent)	92,430	60.5
Democratic	Paul R. Garver	54,711	35.8
Libertarian	Christopher Chadwick	5,692	3.7
Total votes		152,833	100

=== Mayor of San Diego ===
==== 2012 ====
San Diego Mayoral Primary election, 2012
Party	Candidate	Votes	%
Republican	Carl DeMaio	73,508	31.4
Democratic	Bob Filner	73,216	30.5
Independent	Nathan Fletcher	57,939	24.1
Republican	Bonnie Dumanis	31,926	13.3
Nonpartisan	Tobiah Pettus	1,709	0.7
Write-in		752	0.3
Total votes		241,050	100

=== San Diego County Board of Supervisors ===
==== 2018 ====
2018 San Diego County Board of Supervisors District 4 primary election
Candidate	Votes	%
Nathan Fletcher	36,513	29.2
Bonnie Dumanis	32,554	26.1
Lori Saldaña	27,038	21.6
Omar Passons	23,557	18.9
Ken Malbrough	5,267	4.2
Total votes	124,929	100

2018 San Diego County Board of Supervisors District 4 general election
Candidate	Votes	%
Nathan Fletcher	142,785	67.4
Bonnie Dumanis	69,145	32.6
Total votes	211,930	100

==== 2022 ====
2022 San Diego County Board of Supervisors District 4 primary election
Candidate	Votes	%
Nathan Fletcher (incumbent)	76,032	62.1
Amy Reichert	35,349	28.9
Sidiqa A. Hooker	10,988	9.0
Total votes	122,369	100

2022 San Diego County Board of Supervisors District 4 general election
Candidate	Votes	%
Nathan Fletcher (incumbent)	118,114	64.6
Amy Reichert	64,605	35.4
Total votes	182,719	100
