= Special Event Line (San Diego Trolley) =

Light rail line in San Diego, California

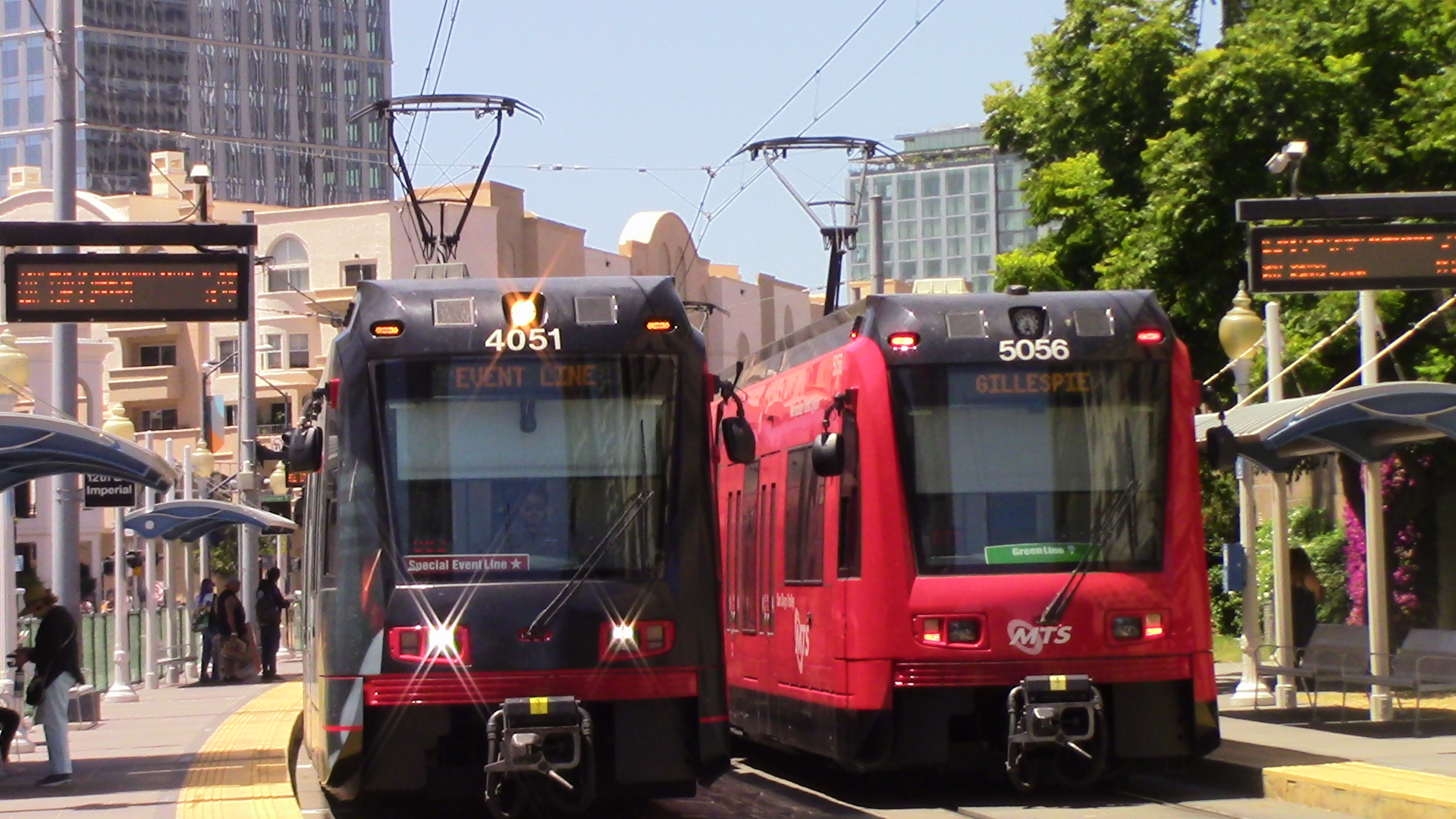
- A Special Event Line trolley (left) next to a Green Line trolley (right) at Seaport Village station

Overview
- Status: Only operates on special events, primarily during San Diego Comic-Con in late July
- Owner: Metropolitan Transit System
- Locale: San Diego, California
- Termini: Balboa Avenue; 12th & Imperial
- Stations: 12
- Website: http://www.sdmts.com/

Service
- Type: Light rail
- System: San Diego Trolley
- Route number: 540 (in internal documents only) (Note: For example, the link www.sdmts.com/getting-around/departures-and-schedules/schedules/540 (with the numbers at the end being a route number) leads to the schedule for the "Special Event Red Line".)
- Operator(s): San Diego Trolley, Inc.

History
- Opened: July 20, 2022; 3 years ago

Technical
- Number of tracks: 2 Tracks
- Track gauge: 4 ft 8 1/2 in (1,435 mm) standard gauge
- Electrification: 600 V DC Overhead lines
- Operating speed: Max. 50 mph (80 km/h)

The Special Event Line, also known as the "Red Line" until 2012, is a light rail line operated by the San Diego Trolley, an operating division of the San Diego Metropolitan Transit System. Two different versions of this line operated, both times only during special events.

The original version of the Special Event Line, operating from at least 2007 to 2012, connected Qualcomm Stadium station with Gaslamp Quarter station, during sporting events at Qualcomm Stadium, Cox Arena, and the SDSU Open Air Theatre (OAT), as well as during events like San Diego Comic-Con. This version of the Special Event Line was discontinued in 2012, after the Trolley Renewal Project saw the Green Line extended over the Special Event Line's route.

In 2022, the Special Event Line was revived, this time only running during Comic-Con. The line runs from Balboa Avenue Transit Center (which had opened in the previous September as part of the Blue Line Mid-Coast extension) to 12th and Imperial.

== Current route (2022-present) ==
Since 2022, the Special Event Line has primarily only operated during the annual San Diego Comic-Con in late July. Service runs from Balboa Avenue Transit Center to 12th and Imperial, following the Green Line's alignment from 12th and Imperial to Old Town Transit Center. Over the course of the 2023 Comic-Con, the Special Event Line served over 100 thousand riders.

=== Stations ===
Station	Location	Connections
Balboa Avenue	Bay Park, San Diego	Blue Line; MTS: 8, 27, 43; Park and ride: 227 spaces
Clairemont Drive	Bay Park, San Diego	Blue Line; MTS: 105
Tecolote Road	Morena, San Diego	Blue Line; Park and ride: 279 spaces
Old Town	Old Town, San Diego	Blue Line Green Line; Pacific Surfliner; Coaster; MTS: 8, 9, 10, 28, 30, 35, 44, 83, 88, 105; (via) San Diego Flyer shuttle; Park and ride: 412 spaces
Washington Street	Mission Hills, San Diego	Blue Line Green Line; MTS: 10
Middletown	Middletown, San Diego	Blue Line Green Line; (via) TROLLEY → TERMINAL shuttle
County Center/Little Italy	Little Italy, San Diego	Blue Line Green Line
Santa Fe Depot	Core, San Diego	Blue Line Green Line; Pacific Surfliner; Coaster; MTS: 83, Rapid 215, Rapid 225, Rapid 235, Rapid Express 280, Rapid Express 290, 923, 992
Seaport Village	Marina, San Diego	Green Line Silver Line
Convention Center	Marina, San Diego	Green Line Silver Line
Gaslamp Quarter	Gaslamp Quarter, San Diego	Green Line Silver Line
12th & Imperial	East Village, San Diego	Blue Line Green Line Orange Line Silver Line; MTS: 4, 12, 901, 929; Greyhound Lines; Park and ride: 1,020 spaces, paid

== 2005–2012 route ==
Special Event Line

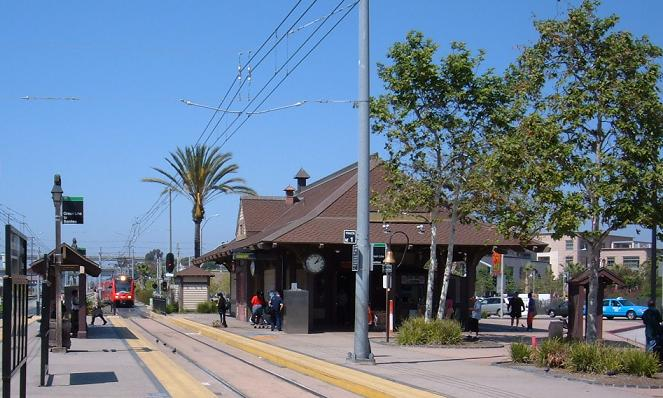
- San Diego Trolley Old Town

Overview
- Status: Closed; later revived on a different route in 2022
- Owner: Metropolitan Transit System
- Locale: San Diego, California
- Termini: Qualcomm Stadium; 12th & Imperial
- Stations: 15
- Website: http://www.sdmts.com/

Service
- Type: Light rail
- System: San Diego Trolley
- Operator(s): San Diego Trolley, Inc.
- Rolling stock: Triple Car U2 Trains _{* Train configurations may vary}

History
- Opened: July 10, 2005; 20 years ago
- Closed: August 29, 2012; 13 years ago

Technical
- Number of tracks: 2 Tracks
- Track gauge: 4 ft 8 1/2 in (1,435 mm) standard gauge
- Electrification: 600 V DC Overhead lines
- Operating speed: Max. 50 mph (80 km/h)

From at least 2007 to 2012, the Red Line operated between Gaslamp Quarter station and Qualcomm Stadium station (now known as Stadium station). They operated once every 15 minutes, during sporting events at Petco Park, Qualcomm Stadium, Cox Arena, and the SDSU Open Air Theater (OAT), as well as selected conventions and other major city events (such as San Diego Comic-Con).

On maps issued during its first tenure in operation, the Red Line was illustrated as a red dashed line, indicating that it was a "Special Event Service Only".

The Special Event Line was discontinued in 2012, as part of the Trolley Renewal Project. (Note: Compare the maps of the San Diego Trolley issued before and after the change in the trolley schedule on September 2, 2012.) The entire route the Special Event line ran is now served by the Green Line (which had been extended from Old Town to 12th & Imperial), and MTS now opts to add cars and increase service on that route when needed. (Note: For example, during the Holiday Bowl Game and Parade in December 2015, the MTS "increase[d] the number of Green Line trains" operating to Qualcomm Stadium.)

The last Special Event Trolley departed at 6:54 pm on August 29, 2012.

=== Stations ===
Station	Location	Connections
Stadium	Mission Valley, San Diego	Green Line
Fenton Parkway	Mission Valley, San Diego	Green Line
Rio Vista	Mission Valley, San Diego	Green Line
Mission Valley Center	Mission Valley, San Diego	Green Line; MTS
Hazard Center	Mission Valley, San Diego	Green Line
Fashion Valley	Mission Valley, San Diego	Green Line; MTS
Morena/Linda Vista	Morena, San Diego	Green Line; MTS
Old Town	Old Town, San Diego	Blue Line Green Line; Coaster; MTS
Washington Street	Mission Hills, San Diego	Blue Line; MTS
Middletown	Middletown, San Diego	Blue Line
County Center/Little Italy	Little Italy, San Diego	Blue Line
Santa Fe Depot	Core, San Diego	Blue Line; Coaster
Seaport Village	Marina, San Diego	Orange Line Silver Line
Convention Center	Marina, San Diego	Orange Line Silver Line
Gaslamp Quarter	Gaslamp Quarter, San Diego	Orange Line Silver Line
12th & Imperial	East Village, San Diego	Blue Line Orange Line Silver Line; MTS
