= PCC streetcar =

1930s streetcar (tram) design

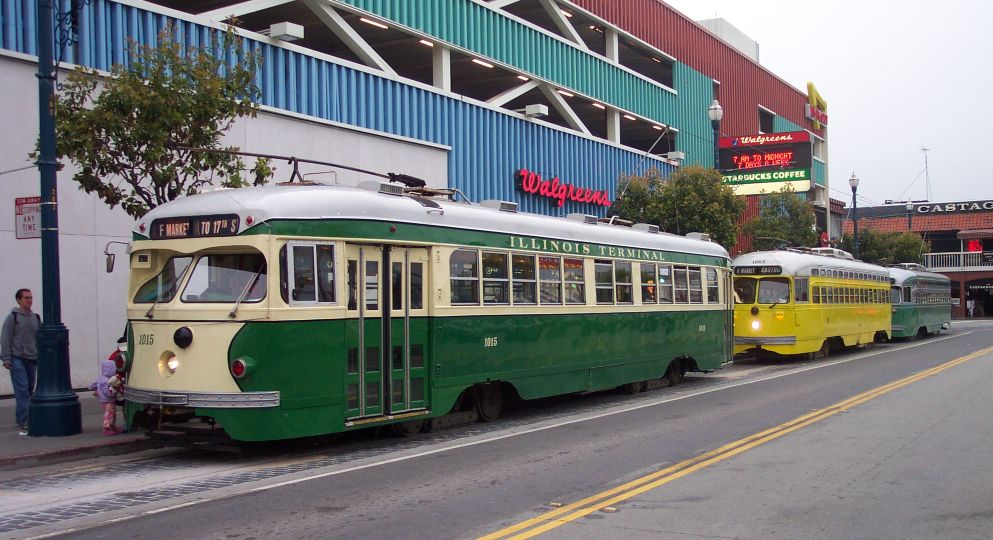
- Three PCCs on the San Francisco Municipal Railway's F line. Pictured are an example of one double-ended streetcar and two single-ended cars.

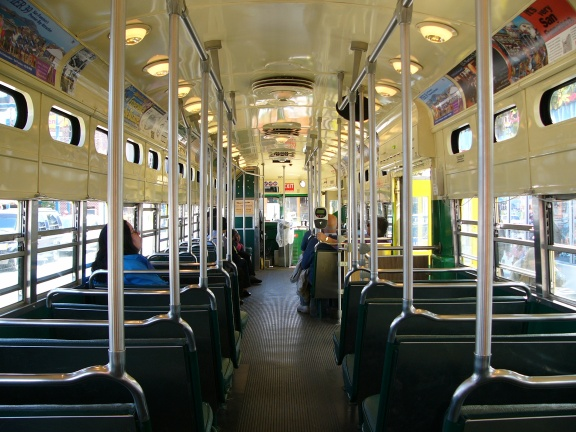
- Interior of a PCC car
- In service: 1936–present
- Manufacturers: St Louis Car Company; Pullman Standard
- Constructed: 1935–1952 (US); 1949–1978 (Europe)
- Number built: 5,000+
- Number preserved: 328+
- Capacity: 52–61 seats

Specifications
- Car length: 46–50.5 ft (14.02–15.39 m)
- Width: 100–108 in (2.54–2.74 m)
- Maximum speed: 50 mph (80 km/h)
- Weight: 35,000–42,000 lb (15,900–19,100 kg)
- Traction motors: 4 × 55 hp (41 kW) motors, 43:6 (≈7.17) gear ratio
- Acceleration: Variable, Automatic 1.5–4.75 mph/s (2.41–7.64 km/(h⋅s))
- Deceleration: Service: Variable to 4.75 mph/s (7.64 km/(h⋅s)), Emergency: 9.0 mph/s (14.5 km/(h⋅s)) maximum
- Electric systems: Overhead line, 600 V DC
- Current collection: Pantograph or trolley pole
- UIC classification: Bo'Bo'
- AAR wheel arrangement: B-B
- Braking systems: Dynamic Service Braking; Friction; for Final Stop, Park; Magnetic
- Track gauge: 5 ft 2 1/2 in (1,588 mm) and other broad gauges 4 ft 8 1/2 in (1,435 mm) standard gauge 1,000 mm (3 ft 3 3/8 in) and other narrow gauges

The Presidents' Conference Committee (PCC) car is a type of streetcar (tram) that was first built in the United States in the 1930s. The design proved successful domestically, and after World War II it was licensed for production and use elsewhere in the world.

The PCC car has proved to be a long-lasting icon of streetcar design. About 5,000 PCC streetcars were built in the United States, with production continuing until 1952. In North America, some PCC streetcars are still in regular service, with most operating on heritage streetcar lines. As of 2026, the San Francisco Municipal Railway is the largest North American operator of PCC cars, using a fleet of 27 on two heritage lines.

After World War II, the PCC design was licensed to multiple European companies. Over 15,000 PCC-derived streetcars were built in Europe, including the popular Tatra T3.

== Origins ==
The Presidents' Conference Committee (PCC) originated from the design committee formed in 1929. It was renamed the "Electric Railway Presidents' Conference Committee" (ERPCC) in 1931. The group's membership consisted primarily of representatives of several large operators of U.S. urban electric street railways plus potential manufacturers. Three interurban lines and at least one "heavy rail", or rapid transit, operator—Chicago Rapid Transit Company—were represented as well. Also included on the membership roll were manufacturers of surface cars (streetcars) and interested component suppliers.

ERPCC's goal was to design a streamlined, comfortable, quiet, and fast accelerating and braking streetcar that would be operated by a seated operator using floor-mounted pedal controls to better meet the needs of the street railways and appeal to riders. ERPCC prepared a detailed research plan, conducted extensive research on streetcar design, built and tested components, made necessary modifications and revisions based upon the findings, and ultimately produced a set of specifications for a standardized and fixed design. It included a modest list of available options with ample room for customer customization but was to be built with standard parts as opposed to a custom designed car body with diverse parts added depending on the whims and requirements of the individual customer. Numerous national and international users operated large fleets of PCC cars for many years.

Many design patents resulted from the work of ERPCC. These were transferred to a new business entity called the Transit Research Corporation (TRC) when ERPCC expired in 1936. Although this company continued the work of research on improvements to the basic design of the car and issued sets of specifications three times in the ensuing years, because TRC defined a PCC car as any vehicle which used patents on which it collected royalties, it was formed for the primary purpose of controlling those patents and promoting the standardization envisioned by the ERPCC. The company was funded by its collection of patent royalties from the railways which bought PCC cars. The company was controlled by a voting trust representing the properties which had invested in the work of ERPCC. One participant in Committee meetings, Philadelphia trolley manufacturer J.G. Brill Company, brought a competitive design—the Brilliner—to market in 1938. Because Raymond Loewy designed elements that were very similar to the PCC look, the Brilliner attracted no large orders, being built only for Atlantic City Transit and the Red Arrow Lines in suburban Philadelphia. Fewer than 50 were sold.

A significant contribution to the PCC design was noise reduction with extensive use of rubber in springs and other components to prevent rattle, vibration, and thus noise and to provide a level of comfort unknown before. Wheel tires were mounted between rubber sandwiches and were electrically isolated so that shunts were required to complete a ground. Resilient wheels were used on most PCC cars, with later heftier versions known as "Super-Resilient".

Gears were another source of considerable noise, solved by employing hypoid gears which are mounted at a right angle to the axle, where three of the six teeth constantly engaged the main gear, reducing lash and noise. All movable truck parts employed rubber for noise reduction as well. "Satisfactory Cushion Wheel of Vital Importance; Develop New Truck Design; Generous Use of Rubber" are headings within a paper that Chief Engineer Clarence F. Hirshfeld both presented and published.

== Initial purchases ==
After a specification document was created by TRC, orders were placed by eight companies in 1935 and 1936. First was Brooklyn & Queens Transit Corporation (B&QT) for 100 cars, then Baltimore Transit Co. (BTCo) for 27 cars, Chicago Surface Lines (CSL) for 83 cars, Pittsburgh Railways Co. (PRCO) for 101 cars, San Diego Electric Railway (SDERy) for 25 cars, Los Angeles Railway (LARy) for 60 cars, and then Boston Elevated Railway (BERy) for one car, a "test" car. In late 1935 or early in 1936 Westinghouse Electric Corporation pressed for one car to be equipped with their electrical equipment for testing in Pittsburgh, since the Brooklyn order would have all cars equipped by General Electric.Clark Equipment Company pressed for one car to be made by them of aluminum for delivery to B&QT. Agreements among the parties were reached whereby St Louis Car Company would build 101 essentially identical PCCs but Clark would build one of its own body design.

Brooklyn received its first car number 1001 on May 28, 1936, PRCo took delivery of car number 100 on July 26, 1936, and Baltimore received its first car on September 2, 1936. In the late 1936 discussions of operating experience, it was noted that the Brooklyn car had run 3,000 miles by the time the Pittsburgh car had run 1,000 miles. One of the key patents was filed by Dan H. Bell on January 8, 1937, and granted on July 5, 1938, and entitled, "Rail Car or Similar Article," Patent No. 110,384. The first car to be placed in a scheduled public service was PRCo 100 in August and B&QT launched its first scheduled service with a group of cars on October 1, 1936, followed by CSL on November 13, 1936.

== Purchases after 1936 and in Europe ==
Production continued in North America by St. Louis Car Co. and Pullman Standard until 1952, with 4,978 units manufactured. In Europe, under license to use the designs patented by TRC, thousands more PCC and PCCs with trailer towing occurred through the last half of the 20th century. All were well built as many hundreds are still in operation.

The majority of large North American streetcar systems surviving after 1935 purchased PCC streetcars. Those which eventually terminated street car operation often sold their PCCs to surviving operators, some for operation, some for parts.

The Melbourne & Metropolitan Tramways Board (MMTB) in Australia was keen to build two new tram routes after World War II, and these routes would be served by PCC Streetcars. The MMTB decided that it was too expensive and Melbourne only ever had two PCC streetcars, of which one was a prototype for a completely different class.

Several dozen remain in public transit service, such as on the Mattapan Line in Boston, as well as in Philadelphia, Kenosha, San Diego and San Francisco following extensive overhauling. All other surviving and functional North American PCC cars are operated by museums and heritage railways. Several retired PCCs from Boston, Cleveland, and Philadelphia were purchased as scrap and have been privately stored just outside Windber, Pennsylvania since 1992.

"The PCC car was not just another modular vehicle but the result of a carefully managed systems engineering approach to designing and producing a new concept to the urban transportation scene." Research went into providing simpler car ingress and egress, improved passenger comfort resulting from less vibration when moving, better acceleration, brighter lighting, better heating and cooling, increased seat spacing and height, consideration of spacing for arms, legs, for passengers standing, less weight, reduced power consumption, reduced wear of trucks, wheel components, and track. Dimensions were established to fit the majority of transit company's needs who purchased, but with a design that could easily be changed for special situations. Windows were spaced to match seating. While some of the components in the PCC car had been used in street cars before 1936—resilient wheels, magnetic braking, sealed gears, and modular design to name a few, this particularly by JG Brill Co. —the ERPCC redesigned, refined, and perfected many of these requirements while developing better acceleration and braking controls and put them all in one PCC package.

== Unique need in Washington, D.C. ==
The PCCs built for Washington, D.C. were among the more unusual examples due to the installation of overhead wires being prohibited within the city limits, necessitating the use of conduit plows that collected current using a "plow" similar to that of a San Francisco cable car lowered into a slot between the rails and once there contacting positive and negative rails under the street. A pit was located at the boundary line of the D.C city limits over which cars would stop to have their power collection changed from the trolley pole to the conduit plow and vice versa.

== Truck/Bogie manufacturing ==
The unique new design PCC streetcar trucks (the assemblies holding the wheels and traction motors) were primarily manufactured by St. Louis Car Company and Clark Equipment between 1936 and the 1950s. Clark Equipment produced most B2-model trucks, while St. Louis Car produced B3-model trucks. Westinghouse as well as GE supplied the electric motors and braking components for these trucks. St. Louis Car Company built the vast majority of PCC streetcar bodies, those with standard 4'8+1/2" trucks. Clark Equipment manufactured PCCs with specialized trucks, such as for Philadelphia's wide gauge, double ended coach application, plus building the only aluminum-body PCC.

== Manufacturing ==
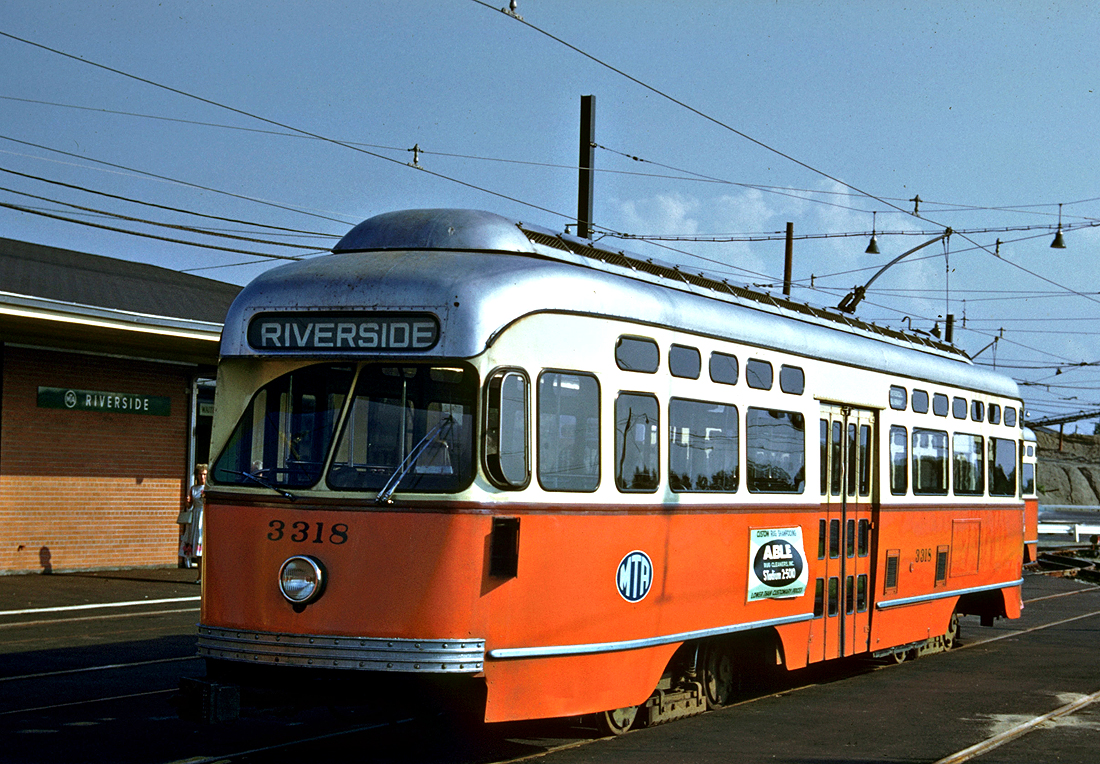
A PCC streetcar at Boston's Riverside station in the early 1960s

Pullman Standard PCCs
Operator	Qty	Year	Fleet numbers	Order
Baltimore Transit Company	248	1939	7023-7033, 7306-7334 (40)	W6569
Baltimore Transit Company	248	1941	7034-7053, 7335-7353 (39)	W6634
Baltimore Transit Company	248	1941	7054-7097, 7354-7378 (69)	W6645
Baltimore Transit Company	248	1941-42	7379-7403 (25)	W6665
Baltimore Transit Company	248	1944	7098-7147 (50)	W6701
Baltimore Transit Company	248	1944	7404-7428 (25)	W6712
Birmingham Railway and Electric Company	48	1947	800-847	W6777
Boston Elevated Railway	320	1941	3002-3021 (20)	W6629
Boston Elevated Railway	320	1944	3022-3121 (100)	W6697
Boston Elevated Railway	320	1945-46	3072-3096 (2nd), 3147-3271 (150)	W6710
Boston Elevated Railway	320	1951	3272-3321 (50)	W6892
Chicago Surface Lines	310	1946-47	4062-4171 (110)	W6749
Chicago Surface Lines	310	1947-48	4172-4371 (200)	W6786
Cincinnati Street Railway	1	1939	1000	W6580
Cleveland Railway Company	50	1946	4200-4249	W6750
Dallas Railway and Terminal Company	25	1945	601-625	W6699
Pacific Electric Railway	30	1940	5000-5029	W6624
Shaker Heights Rapid Transit	25	1948	71-95	W6820

PCC cars were initially built in the United States by the St Louis Car Company (SLCCo) and Pullman Standard. Clark Equipment built the only aluminum-body PCC as well as all narrow gauge B1 trucks for Los Angeles, all the standard and broad gauge B2 trucks both air- and all-electric, and the B2B trucks used under PRCo 1725–1799 and Toronto 4500–4549. SLCCo built all B3 trucks, both standard and broad gauge. PCC cars for Canadian cities were assembled in Montreal, Quebec by Canadian Car & Foundry from bodies and trucks supplied by St. Louis Car.

Westinghouse (Westinghouse Electric, Westinghouse Air Brake Company, Canadian Westinghouse Co.) and General Electric both supplied electrical packages and brake components which were designed and built in cooperation with the ERPCC. The customer specified the equipment, which was to be installed, performance was similar, and most cities ordered from both suppliers. Since Westinghouse was home based near Pittsburgh, PRCo ordered 75% of its PCC fleet with Westinghouse equipment, the balance with GE. Indeed, PCCs are often identified as either Westinghouse or GE.

The last PCC streetcars built for any North American system were a batch of 25 for the San Francisco Municipal Railway, manufactured by St. Louis and delivered in 1951–2.

A total of 4,586 PCC cars were purchased by United States transit companies: 1,057 by Pullman Standard and 3,534 by St. Louis. Most transit companies purchased one type, but Chicago, Baltimore, Cleveland, and Shaker Heights ordered from both. The Baltimore Transit Co. (BTC) considered the Pullman cars of superior construction and easier to work on. The St. Louis cars had a more aesthetically pleasing design with a more rounded front and rear, compound-curved skirt cut-outs, and other design frills.

=== Performance ===
When a wire is placed in a magnetic field and an electric current is passed through it, the wire will move. If this wire is wrapped on a spool and placed in a magnetic field with an electric current passed through it, the spool (rotor) will rotate, creating an electric motor. If the strength of the magnetic field or the amount of current running through the motor is increased (or both), the motor's speed will increase. With a trolley, the speed is controlled by several resistors placed in the wire running to the rotor. Removing circuit resistors one at a time will increase the current in the motor's magnetic field and this will increase the motor's speed.

Prior streetcar speed control from the 1880s required a standing operator at a four-foot-high vertical controller "stand" to rotate a handle to one of ten electrical resistance points within the stand to provide trolley acceleration. The resistors were not very large and were mounted adjacent to one another along the outside frame bottom of the trolley to provide cooling as they would get very hot. For the PCC however, there were more than ten resistance/speed points; Westinghouse developed the XD-323 underfloor rotary accelerator for the PCC's motor control with 99 resistance points. It was installed in the first Pittsburgh car, number 100, and minor modifications allowed use in the last PCCs produced in North America for San Francisco in 1952.

The sitting PCC operator had a foot accelerator on the floor, much like that of an automobile, with linkage to underfloor resistance ribbons mounted in a circle. An arm rotating in the circle center had rollers on either end which cut out field resistance to increase speed as it was rotated a total of approximately 180 degrees. This same accelerator also was used for dynamic braking; when the accelerator pedal was released, the resistance wheel sought optimum braking for the speed, which prevented a lag when the brake pedal was depressed. Westinghouse's design was remarkable and innovative in that it allowed motor control by floor pedal similar to that of an automobile. General Electric also developed a control system for PCC cars that mirrored the Westinghouse scheme in function although not in simplicity or maintainability. With the GE commutator motor controller operating by air pressure, it had to be redesigned with the advent of the All-Electric PCC. Acceleration was variable between 1.5-to-4.75-mile-per-hour per second (2.41 to 7.64 km/h) depending upon the depression of the power pedal with the accelerator advanced automatically by a low-voltage pilot motor. Service braking was also variable and the maximum dynamic application decreased speed by 4.75 mph per second (7.64 km/h); pressing the brake pedal into emergency also brought the friction and magnetic brakes into play providing a maximum deceleration of 9 mph /s (14 km/h). Compared to a maximum of 14 points on older equipment, the PCC was considerably smoother.

Most PCCs employed three pedals with a dead man's switch to the left, brake in center, and power pedal on the right. Depressing the brake about half-way and then releasing the deadman pedal put the PCC in "park". Lifting the deadman alone would apply all brakes, drop sand, and balance the doors so they could be pushed open easily. Chicago used "bicycle-type levers" for power and brake but converted some cars to two pedals. St. Louis Public Service Co. (SLPS) used two pedals, both with heel interlocks. The right pedal is the brake; depressing this pedal about halfway while lifting away from the heel applied "park". Once the brake is released the heel need not be engaged with the interlock (although a professional driver is to cover the brake at all times). The left pedal applied the power and the heel interlock had to be engaged at all times since it was the deadman; only when the brake was in "park" could the deadman be disengaged.

St. Louis is unique in that all 300 of their PCCs are All-Electric with the 1500s ordered in late 1939, the 1600s ordered late 1940s and the 1700s in January 1945. SLPS was the rolling laboratory for All-Electrics and what was learned here was applied to the post-WW2 All-Electric demonstrator in the fall of 1945.

From 1936 to 1945, PCC cars were "Air-Electrics" with friction brakes, doors, and windshield wipers operated by air pressure. PRCo PCC 1600 of 1945 was the post-WW2 All-Electric Demonstrator which eliminated the air compressor and associated piping while incorporating such features as standee windows, a sloped windshield to eliminate nighttime glare, redesigned back end, forced-air ventilation, and other features. Dynamic brakes were the service brake on all PCCs; when almost stopped, friction brakes completed the stop and held the car in "park". Dynamic brakes slowed the "Air" cars to 3 mph (4.8 km/h) at which point a lock-out relay allowed automatic application of air-applied friction brakes against each of the eight wheels. On All-Electric cars the dynamics were effective to 0.75 mph (1.21 km/h) where the lockout relay then allowed a spring-applied friction brake to engage a drum on each of the four motor drive shafts; this completed the stop and held the car in park. Drum brakes were released by an electric solenoid operating from low-voltage battery power; a power failure would prevent the drums from releasing which would prevent power application, a fail-safe feature. Drum brakes were quite popular and greatly reduced maintenance thus some "Air" cars were retrofitted with drums. Four magnetic brakes, one between the wheels on each side of each truck, applied additional braking for emergency stopping where all brakes were generally employed.

"These performances [acceleration and braking] enable the P.C.C. car to out-pace the average automobile which, in America, is of substantially higher performance than the typical British vehicle." This, however, is only true when compared to the automobiles of that period.

The system of acceleration and braking described above means that the original PCC cars were (when in movement) always either accelerating or braking. A later improvement on the Brussels trams (built at that time under license by La Brugeoise et Nivelles and ACEC, now both subsidiaries of Bombardier Transportation, itself a subsidiary of the French Alstom) allowed the trams to coast under their accumulated kinetic energy.

=== Body variations ===
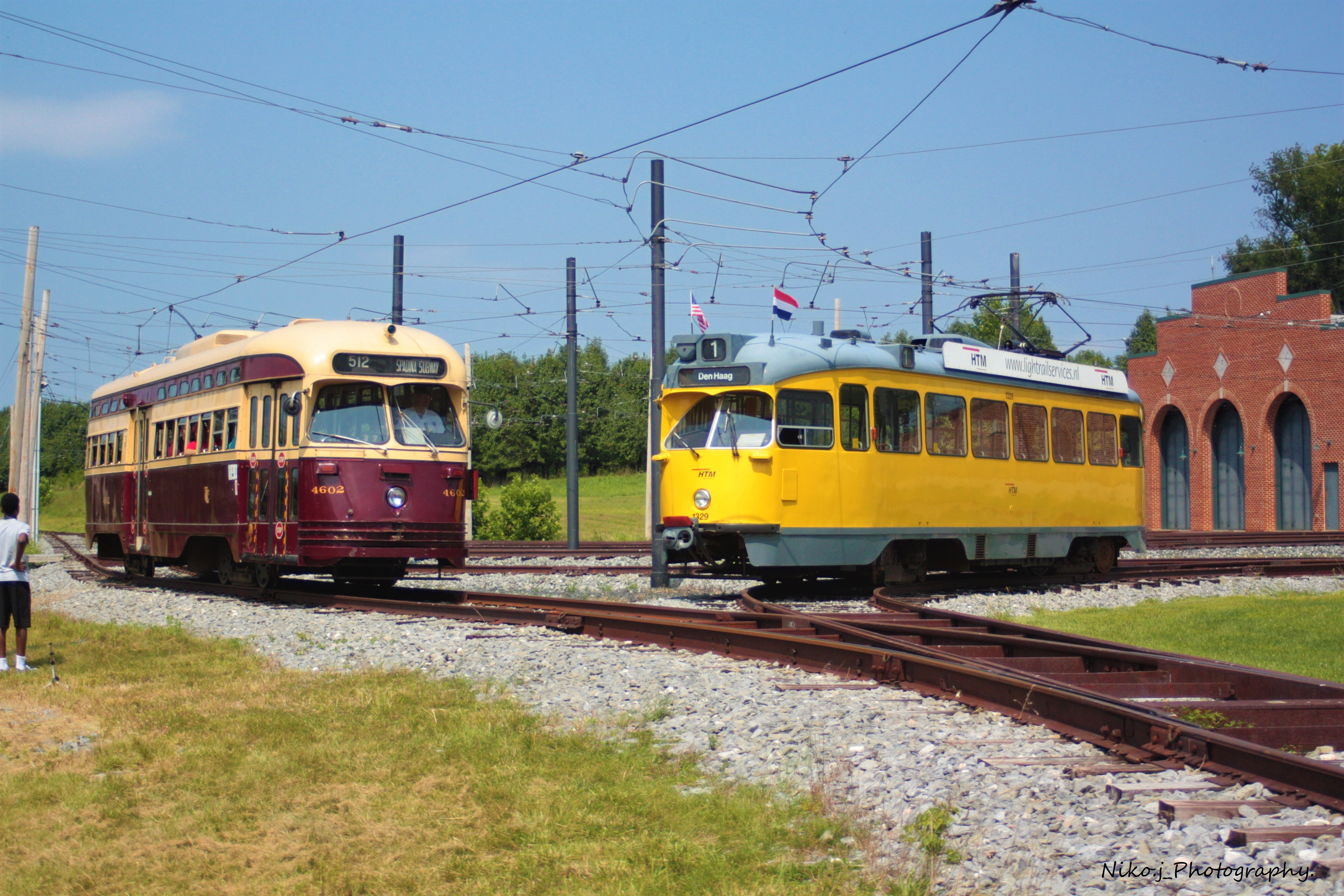
North American (Toronto, left) versus European PCC (The Hague, right): European PCC cars had narrower bodies and (often) larger windows.

Two main body standards were made—1936 and 1945, sometimes called pre- and post-war—the most prominent difference being the windows.

The pre-war cars usually had a right side arrangement of front door, five windows, center door, five windows, and one large rear quarter window. These cars were 46 ft (14.0 m) long and 8 ft 4 in (254 cm) wide. There were variations, Washington, D.C. ordered shorter cars, at 44 ft (13.4 m), with one less window, while Chicago ordered longer and wider cars, at 50 ft 5 in (15.4 m) by 8 ft 9 in (267 cm), with a three-door arrangement. Chicago cars were built with the centerline of the carbody to the right of the centerline of the tracks, so the widened cars could pass on the existing trackage.

Post war cars had a rationalized window arrangement. The windows and pillars were narrower, and there were small "standee" windows above each window. Right side arrangement usually was front door, seven windows, side door, four windows, and two rear quarter windows. Most post-war cars had a length of 46 ft 5 in (14.1 m). Other body differences were a recessed windshield and wider doors. There were far fewer variations of this style, width being the most common.

Most double ended cars, at 50 ft 5 in (15.4 m) long by 9 ft (270 cm) wide, were larger than standard, with different door arrangements. Only Dallas ordered standard size double ended cars. All double ended cars retained the pre-war style body until the end of production.

== Rapid transit cars ==
There were four rapid transit companies on the committee, but the primary focus was streetcars, rapid transit development was slower. The difference in operations between the systems also made standardization difficult.

By 1940, Brooklyn had five three-section articulated trainsets with PCC components, after WWII Chicago ordered four similar trainsets. Chicago ordered two from Pullman and two from St. Louis, with different equipment, so that competing manufacturers could be directly compared. Experience from the trainsets influenced the following car standards.

Cars were to be approximately 48 ft (14.6 m) long (the Chicago maximum, Boston had some 55 ft (16.8 m) long) with one cab per car arranged in "married" two car sets, a double ended single car variant was possible. Number and type of doors and windows, interior layout, and width of cars varied with each system. Boston had two sizes, the longest at 55 ft (16.8 m), and narrowest at 8 ft 4 in (254 cm), Cleveland had the widest at 10 ft 4 in (315 cm).

Trucks were a major focus, both Clark and St. Louis developed trucks with 28 in (710 mm) wheels and a 70 mph (110 km/h) maximum speed, but only Boston used them, Clark B10s on 40 cars. Chicago used streetcar type trucks, with 26 in (660 mm) wheels and a speed of 50 mph (80 km/h), adequate for their system. When Clark stopped building railroad equipment in 1952 PCC trucks were no longer available, Boston and Cleveland then used non PCC trucks with 28 in (710 mm) wheels.

Chicago ordered the first of 770 (720 + 50 double-ended) 6000-series cars in 1948 (before the standard, which they influenced), Boston (40, then later 100) in 1950, and Cleveland (70 + 18 double-ended) in 1952. Chicago's first 200 cars were entirely new, but in 1953 they started using components salvaged from new, but no longer needed, streetcars. Toronto, on the committee, initially considered buying the cars, but increased metal prices due to the Korean War made them prohibitively costly. Brooklyn, who had bought the first five prototype trainsets, also did not buy any production trainsets.

240 PCC rapid transit cars were built in four years, from 1948 to 1952, then 438 cars with non-PCC trucks until 1957, the last of Chicago's 570 cars built with salvaged components were delivered in 1958. Some Chicago cars were in regular service in 1990, car number 30 made its last revenue run in 1999.

== PCC fleets ==
=== Historical ===
The operator listed is the original purchaser.

Operator	Country	New	Used	Total	Notes
Toronto Transportation Commission	Canada	540	225	765	Main article: Presidents' Conference Committee (Toronto streetcar) Toronto's first PCC streetcar entered service on September 22, 1938. All new PCCs purchased by 1951; second-hand by 1957. The TTC now owns and operates only two PCCs for private charter: numbers 4500 and 4549. One PCC, #4612, was donated in operating condition by the TTC to the Edmonton Radial Railway Society in 1997; the society has two additional PCCs from Toronto (4349 and 4367) awaiting restoration. The Halton Country Railway Museum (near Milton Ontario) owns 3 retired TTC streetcars, 4000, 4386 and 4426. They operate a short section of track and 4000 is used for rides in rotation with other streetcars in their collection.
Chicago Surface Lines	United States	683	0	683	A total of 683 cars were purchased in 1948. Ten years later all but one of the prewar cars had been scrapped, and most of the postwar cars had been stripped of parts. These were reused in 570 new CTA 1-50 and 6200-series rapid transit cars. Two PCC streetcars are preserved at the Illinois Railway Museum: one prewar car for display only, and one postwar car in operating condition.
Pittsburgh Railways	United States	666	0	666	666 in 1949; 609 in 1959 (11 lost to Homewood fire in May 1955;); 595 in 1960; 457 in 1961. Twelve cars fully rebuilt (and four partially) into 4000 series cars in 1981–88, all remaining cars retired by 1988. The last 4000-series cars were retired in 1999.
Philadelphia Transportation Company	United States	470	90	560	All new PCCs purchased by 1947; 60 second-hand by 1955. 30 additional ex-Toronto/Kansas City class A-14 PCCs purchased in 1976. All cars retired by 1992, with some retained for work service or charter runs. 18 rebuilt into PCC II cars in 2003, and returned to revenue service.
Capital Transit Company	United States	489	0	489	Built to a unique shorter-than-standard design. Only PCCs that used conduit current collection.
Servicio de Transportes Electricos del Distrito Federal	Mexico	1	390	391	A single PCC in 1947 from St. Louis Car Company, plus later second-hand cars: 116 in 1947–48 from the United States and tramways in Aviación and Dolores; 91 in 1954 from Minneapolis; 183 in 1955 from Detroit.
Boston Elevated Railway	United States	321	25	346	The Green Line ran PCC streetcars from 1937 until their retirement in 1985. PCCs continue to operate along a section of the Red line (see section below).
St. Louis Public Service Company	United States	300	0	300	100 purchased in 1940; 100 in 1941; 100 in 1946. System abandoned in 1966.
Baltimore Transit Company	United States	275	0	275	Second city to place multiple-PCC order, 1936. System abandoned in 1963. Last PCC in operation, #7407, preserved and operates at the Baltimore Streetcar Museum.
Haagsche Tramweg-Maatschappij	Netherlands	234	0	234	The Hague's first PCC streetcar arrived July, 1949. All new PCCs purchased by 1975.
Detroit Department of Street Railways	United States	186	0	186	
Kansas City Public Service Company	United States	184	0	184	Originally planned to be 371 cars.
Los Angeles Railway	United States	165	0	165	First cars delivered in 1937. System sold to Los Angeles Metropolitan Transit Authority in 1958 and abandoned in 1963.
Twin City Rapid Transit Company	United States	141	0	141	System abandoned in 1954.
Cairo Tramways Company	Egypt	0	140	140	140 cars purchased from Toronto in 1968, but 13 never entered service. Of the 127 cars in service, 85 were converted between 1972 and 1978 into two-car trains or double-ended three-car trains. The entire fleet was withdrawn by 1984 in favor of modern rolling stock.
San Francisco Municipal Railway	United States	40	80	120	Five double-ended non-patent cars purchased in 1939. Ten cars in 1948 and another 25 in 1952. Muni number 1040 was the last new PCC built in the U.S. Replaced by LRVs in 1980–1982. Revived along a former segment in 1995 (see section below).
Tranvías de Barcelona	Spain	0	101	101	Second-hand from Washington DC.
Brooklyn & Queens Transit	United States	100	0	100	First cars delivered in 1936. The sole Clark-built PCC ran here. Withdrawal began in 1950, system abandoned in 1956. Cars 1000 and 1001 are preserved in museums.
Cleveland Transit System	United States	50	25	75	Second-hand cars purchased from Louisville in 1946. All cars sold to Toronto in 1952. Nine cars sent to Shaker Heights in 1978.
JKP GRAS Sarajevo	Yugoslavia	0	71	71	50 cars in 1958, followed by an additional 21 in 1962, all from Washington, D.C.
GSP Belgrade	Yugoslavia	0	70	70	Delivered from Washington between 1958 and 1961. 14 were rebuilt into two-car articulated trams in 1964.
Shaker Heights Rapid Transit	United States	25	43	68	Original Pullman cars were extra-wide and had left-side doors. 20 cars purchased from Twin Cities Rapid Transit in 1953; 10 cars purchased from St. Louis in 1959; 2 former Illinois Terminal cars leased from museums in 1975; 2 cars purchased from NJ Transit in 1977; 9 ex-Cleveland cars purchased from Toronto in 1978. PCCs were used until 1981.
Cincinnati Street Railway	United States	26	25	51	
Birmingham Railway and Electric Company	United States	48	0	48	
Sociedad Cooperativa de Transportes Eléctricos de Tampico y Miramar	Mexico	0	43	43	Purchased used from Kansas City (10 cars), St. Louis (20), and Toronto (10). System abandoned on 13 December 1974.
British Columbia Electric Railway	Canada	36	0	36	System abandoned 1955.
San Diego Electric Railway	United States	28	6	34	First cars purchased in 1937. System abandoned in 1949. System reopened in 1981. Historic PCC operation resumed in 2011.
Pacific Electric Railway	United States	30	0	30	Double-ended. Longest PCCs built.
Newark Public Service Railway	United States	0	30	30	Cars were purchased from Twin City Rapid Transit in 1954. They were in operation until 2001.
Dallas Railway and Terminal Company	United States	25	0	25	Double-enders. All sold to Boston in 1958–59.
Louisville Railway	United States	0	25	25	
El Paso City Lines	United States	0	20	20	17 purchased from San Diego in 1947, plus three more in 1952. System abandoned 1974. System reopened in 2019 with six restored cars.
Montreal Tramways Company	Canada	18	0	18	Delivered in 1944. System abandoned in 1959.
Johnstown Traction Company	United States	17	0	17	
Niagara Frontier Transportation Authority	United States	0	12	12	These cars were purchased in the 1980s for the Tonawandas corridor, but were never used.
Illinois Terminal Railroad	United States	8	0	8	
Leonard's M&O Subway	United States	0	7	7	Second-hand Washington cars rebuilt for double-ended high platform operation.

=== Current ===
Most PCC-based systems were dismantled in the post-war period in favor of bus-based transit networks. Of the rail transit systems that survived this period, most had replaced their PCCs with modern light rail vehicles (LRVs) by the early 1980s. Beginning in the late 1990s, several cities began to make use of historic PCCs to serve historic streetcar lines that combined aspects of tourist attractions and transit. This table lists the transit agencies that still employ PCCs in revenue service, as opposed to a short-run or intermittent heritage railway.

Operator	Line(s)	Place	Started	PCCs
Muni	E Embarcadero, F Market & Wharves	San Francisco, California	1995	27
SEPTA	G	Philadelphia, Pennsylvania	2005	18
Kenosha Electric Streetcar		Kenosha, Wisconsin	2000	7
El Paso Streetcar		El Paso, Texas	2018	6
Tourist Tram by HOVM	The Hague–Scheveningen loop	The Hague, South Holland	2016	4
MBTA	Mattapan Line	Boston, Massachusetts	1941	10
San Diego Trolley	Silver Line	San Diego, California	2011	2
M-Line Trolley		Dallas, Texas	2003	3
Toronto Transportation Commission	loaned to the Halton County Radial Railway	Toronto, Ontario	1938	2

==== Mattapan Line ====
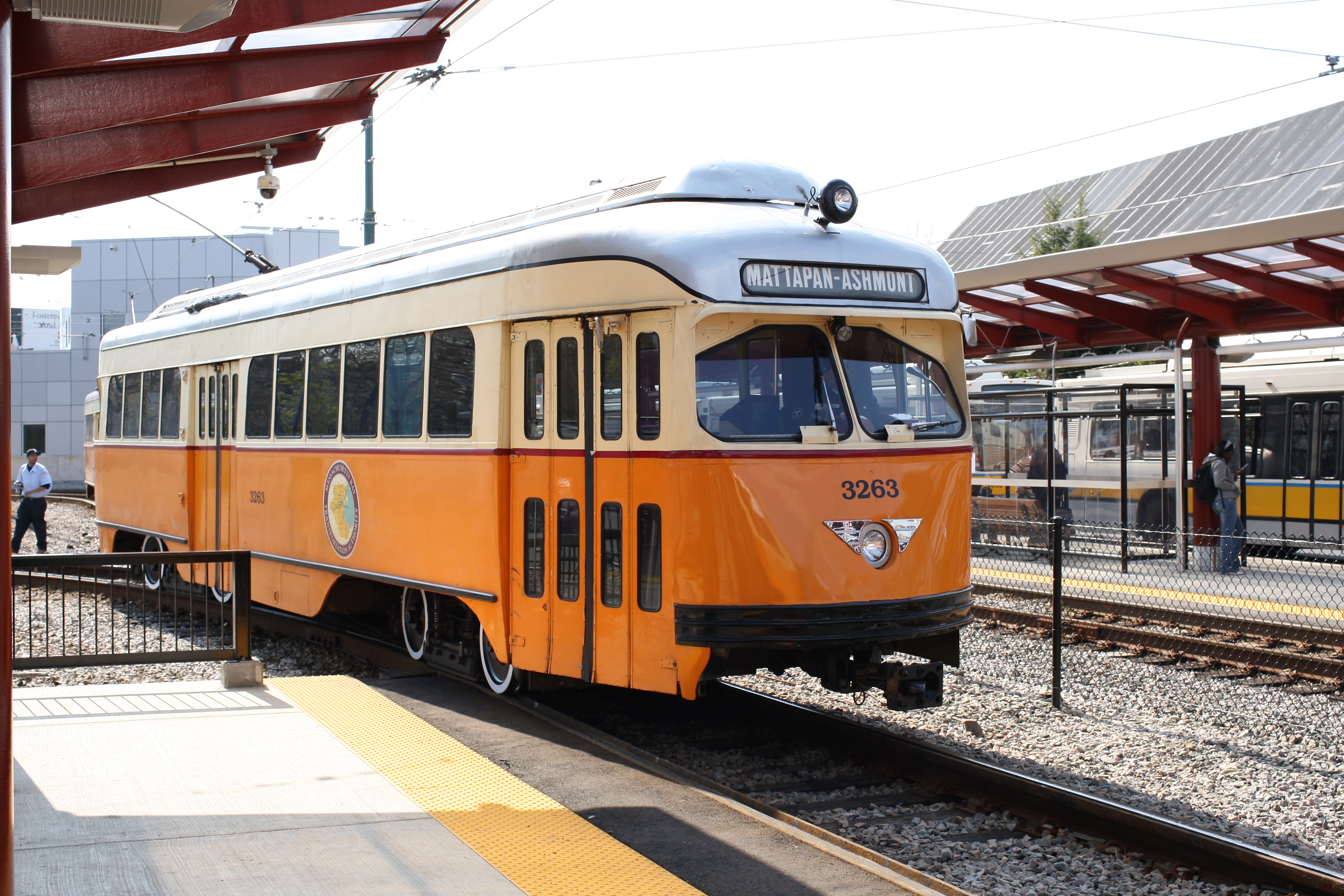
PCC 3263 at Mattapan

Boston; started 1941; number in service: 6.
The Mattapan Line in Boston is a light-rail extension of the MBTA's heavy Red Line. It runs from the Ashmont terminus of the Red Line to Mattapan, and runs PCCs exclusively. The line was shut down for reconstruction from June 24, 2006, until December 22, 2007, but PCC cars have resumed operation since the line's stations cannot support larger light rail vehicles (LRV) operated on the MBTA's Green Line. Not considered historic equipment, the PCC cars in use on the Mattapan–Ashmont line represent the oldest cars still in revenue service, originally built between 1943 and 1946. The fleet consists of 10 total PCCs, with 6 running at any given time. These cars are also the only air-electric PCCs still in regular service in North America. Several retired PCCs from Boston are now at the Seashore Trolley Museum in Kennebunkport, Maine and Shelburne Falls Trolley Museum in Buckland, Massachusetts.

==== M-Line Trolley ====
Dallas; started 2003; number in service: 1.
The McKinney Avenue Transit Authority in Dallas, Texas, owns three PCC cars, two from Toronto, one from the former Tandy Center Subway. One of the ex Toronto cars is currently in service.

==== El Paso Streetcar ====
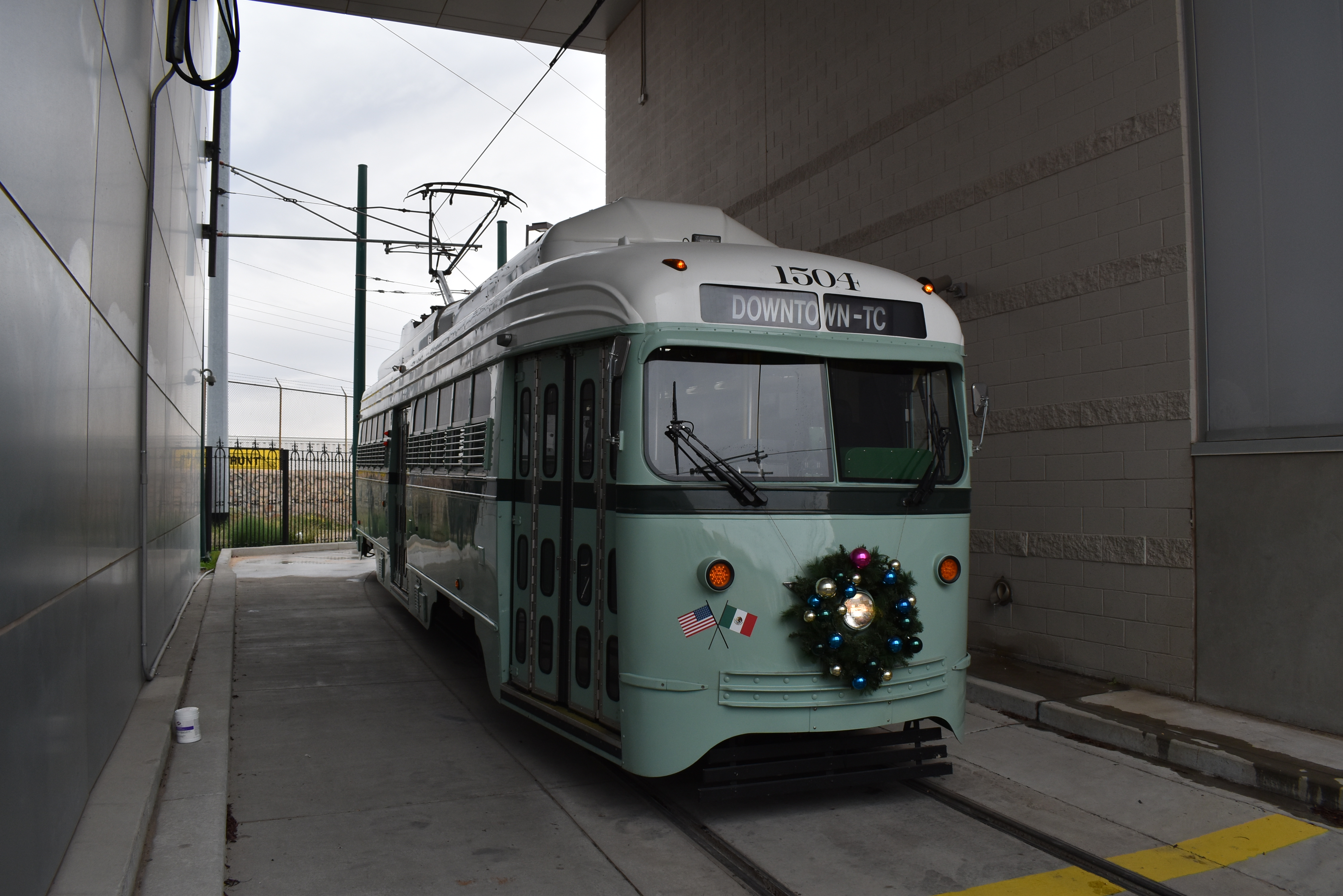
A streetcar at the carbarn in downtown El Paso

El Paso; started 2018; number in service: 6.
Officials in El Paso expressed their desire to preserve the history of the city by refurbishing the old PCC streetcars that once made their way through Downtown from 1949 to 1974. They operated on the international streetcar line that connected El Paso, Texas in the United States, with Ciudad Juárez, Mexico. Originally, the line operated until 1973. Six cars in total have been restored, regular revenue operations began in late 2018 for the downtown loop.

==== Streetcars in Kenosha, Wisconsin ====
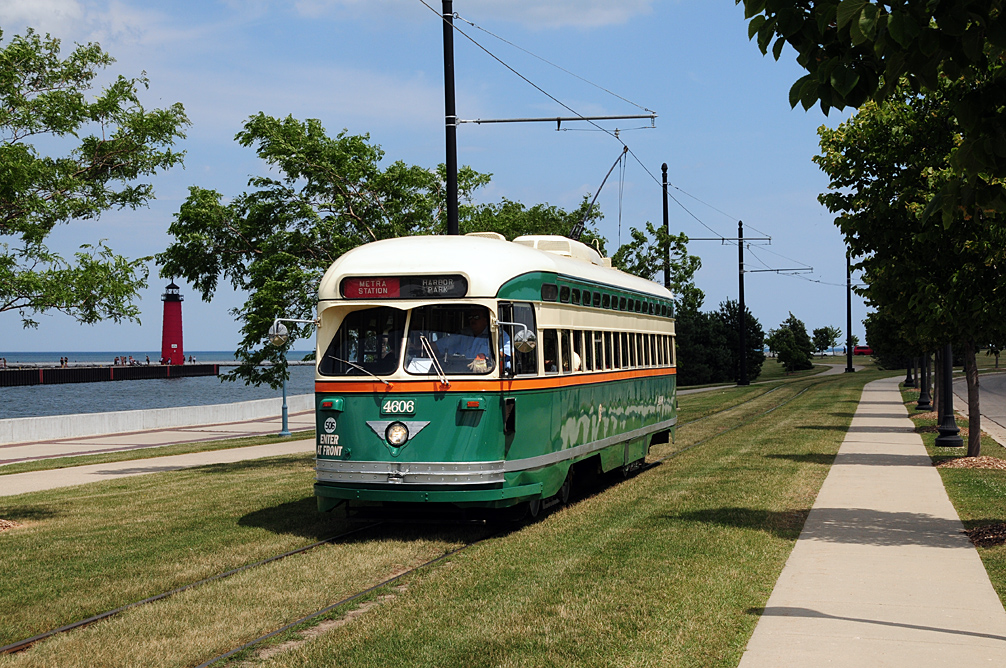
A PCC streetcar touring HarborPark

Kenosha; started 2000; number in service: 7.
The Kenosha Electric Streetcar in Kenosha, Wisconsin, has been operating six ex-Toronto Transit Commission PCCs (five since 2000 and the sixth since 2009) and one ex-SEPTA car since 2009. The Kenosha Electric is unique among modern PCC operations in that PCCs had not run in the city before 2000—the original rail system was shut down in 1932 before any PCC cars had been built. Two of its cars are still painted in their original TTC colours, while the rest have been re-decorated in the liveries of several U.S. cities including Pittsburgh, Johnstown, Chicago and Cincinnati.

==== G (SEPTA Metro) ====
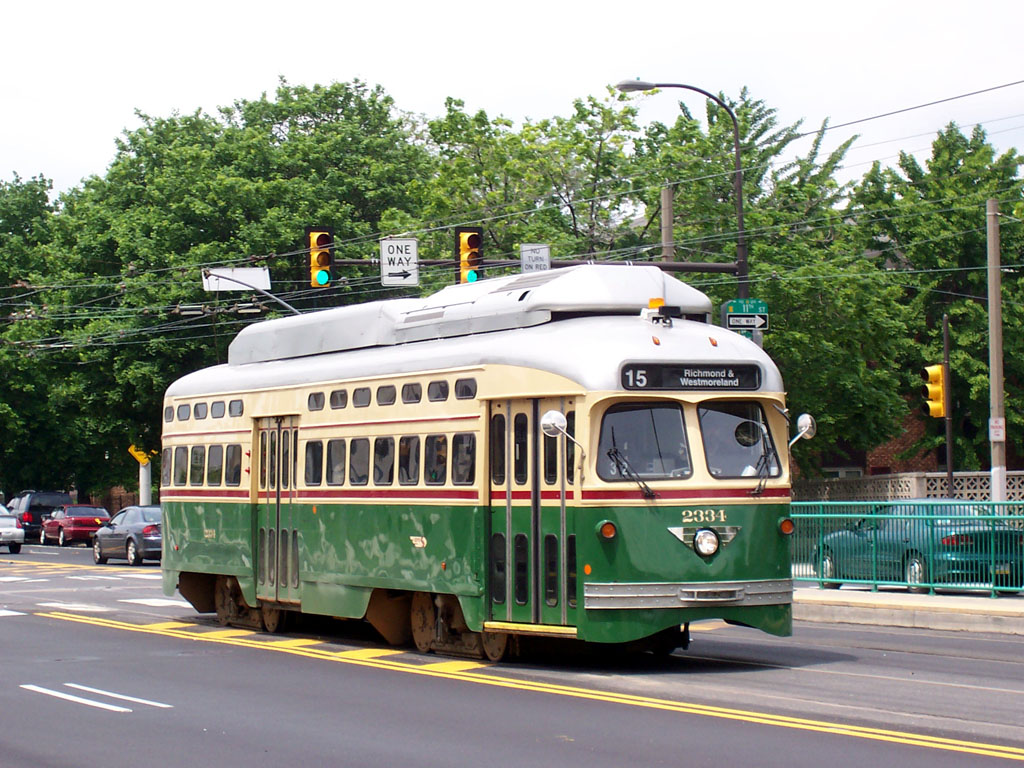
SEPTA PCC II (since rebuilt as PCC III) operating on the Route 15

Philadelphia; started 2005; number in service: 18.
SEPTA restored trolley service to the Route 15 Girard Avenue line in Philadelphia in September 2005 after a 15-year "temporary" suspension of trolley service in favor of diesel buses. The line uses restored and modernized (by the Brookville Manufacturing Company) PCC cars, known as PCC-IIs (now upgraded as PCC-IIIs), painted in their original green and cream Philadelphia Transit Company livery, rather than SEPTA's white with red and blue stripes. Modernization included all-new control systems, modern turn markers, HVAC system (which accounts for the noticeably larger roof enclosure), and ADA compliant wheelchair lifts. The line runs from Haddington to Port Richmond down the median of Girard Avenue. It crosses both the Broad Street Subway and the Market–Frankford Line, and stops at the Philadelphia Zoo, among other landmarks. SEPTA had originally planned to run modern Kawasaki trolleys along the line once service was restored, but a combination of economics and a desire to help revive the Girard Avenue corridor with a more "romantic" vehicle led to the agency restoring the old vehicles for about half the cost of new cars. SEPTA uses Kawasaki vehicles on the rest of its trolley lines, including the Subway-Surface Green Line linking West Philadelphia with Center City and its 69th Street Transportation Center with the western suburbs of Media and Sharon Hill via light rail routes 101 and 102.

==== Silver Line (San Diego Trolley) ====
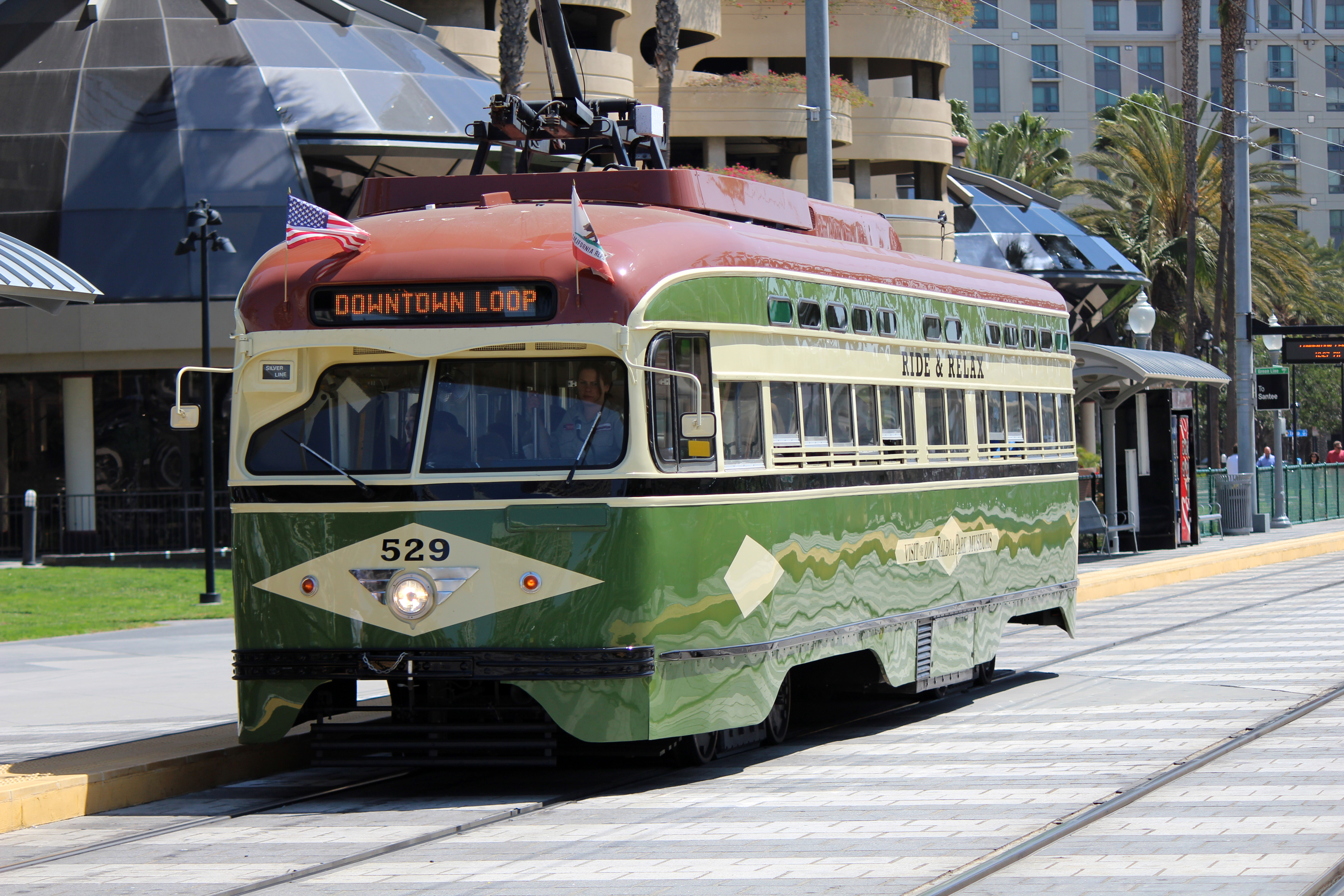
Silver Line car 529 at Convention Center station

San Diego; started 2011; number in service: 2.
San Diego Trolley currently uses 2 PCCs and is in the process of determining viability of a third car as of 2016. They are in use on the Silver Line which opened in 2011 and runs in a clockwise loop around Downtown San Diego.

==== F Market & Wharves ====
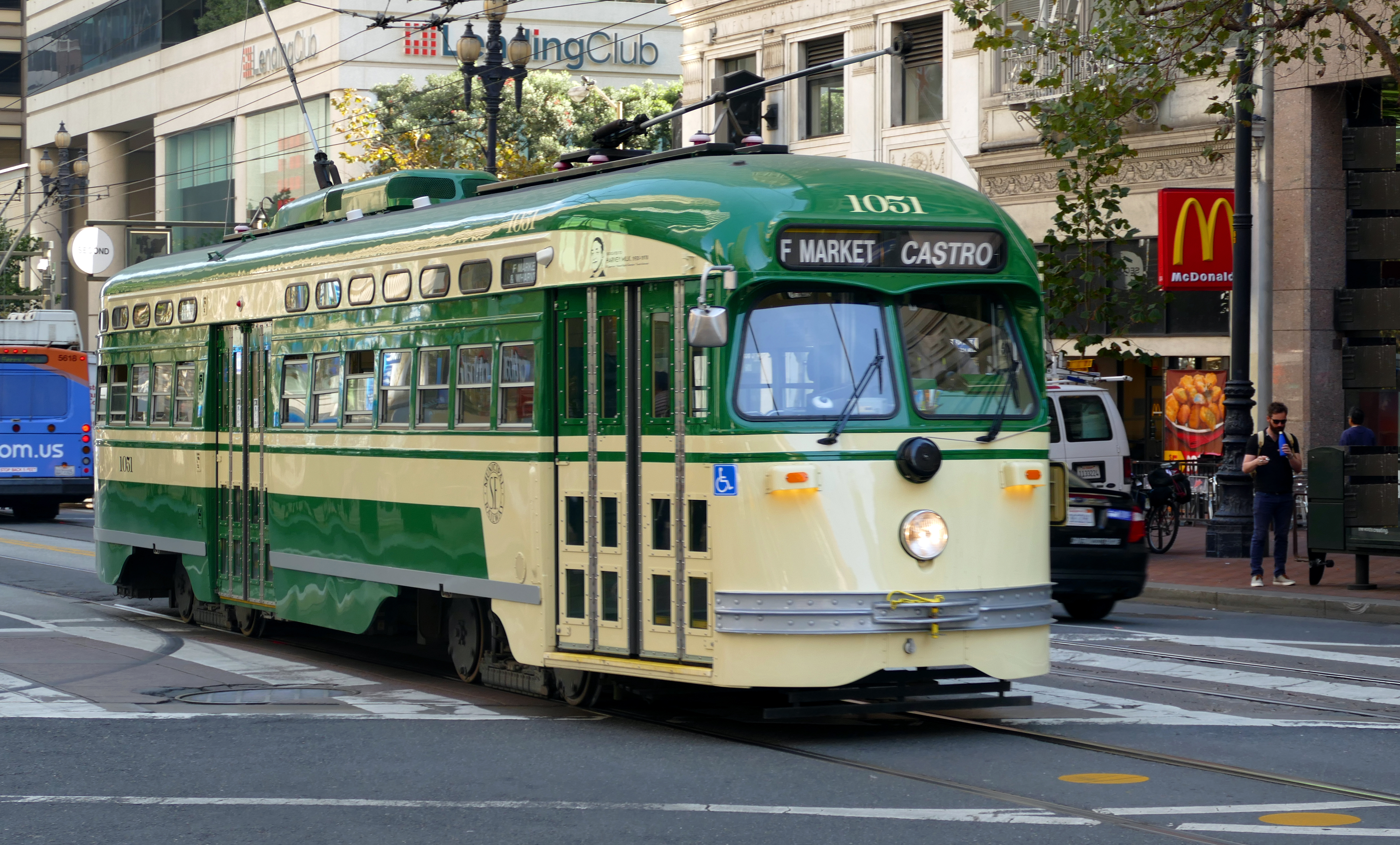
Muni #1051 crossing Second Street in October 2017

San Francisco; started 1995; number in service: 27.

The F Market Line (historic streetcar service) in San Francisco, opened in 1995, runs along Market Street from The Castro to the Ferry Building, then along the Embarcadero north and west to Fisherman's Wharf. This line is run by a mixture of PCC cars built between 1946 and 1952, and earlier pre-PCC cars. Due to its success, a second heritage line was inaugurated in 2015, the E Embarcadero, which serves to facilitate a one-seat ride from the Caltrain San Francisco station to Fisherman's Wharf. Although San Francisco had removed PCCs from revenue service when the city's light rail was transformed into the Muni Metro system in 1980, they had made occasional festival trips in the ensuing years before being returned to full-time service. Car 1074 is painted in Toronto Transit Commission livery, but was never owned by the TTC.

==== Toronto streetcar system ====
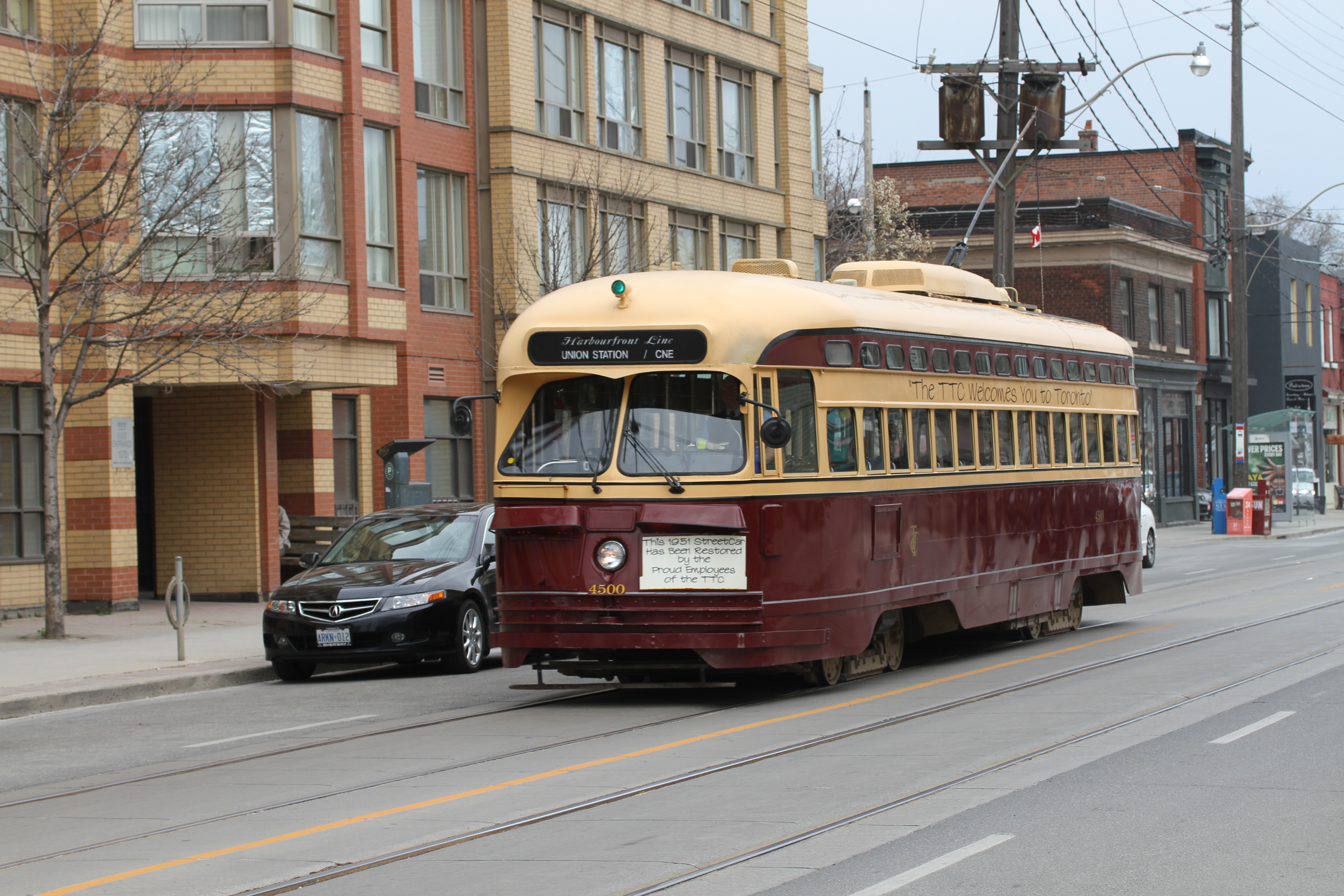
TTC PCC #4500 in April 2012

Toronto; started 1938; number in service: 2.
The first PCC cars in Canada were operated by the Toronto Transit Commission (TTC) in 1938. By 1954, Toronto had the largest PCC fleet in the world, including many purchased second-hand from U.S. cities that abandoned streetcar service following the Second World War. Although it acquired new custom-designed streetcars in the late 1970s and 1980s (and which was replaced by modern LRVs by Dec. 2019), the TTC continued using PCCs in regular service until 1995, and retained two (numbers 4500 and 4549) for charter purposes.

After the TTC was rebuilt for pantograph-only, instead of trolley pole operation, 4500 and 4549 were loaned to the Halton County Radial Railway in 2025, where they are currently operated. These cars may eventually be rebuilt with pantographs so they could return to the TTC.

== Models based on the PCC streetcar ==
The PCC license was used worldwide after World War II had ended which resulted in adaptations based on the American PCC design. Two such licensees were successful, namely the Belgian company La Brugeoise et Nivelles (since 1988 a subsidiary of Bombardier Transportation, itself since 2021 a subsidiary of the French Alstom), who built both standard-gauge and meter-gauge cars based on the PCC license for many networks in Belgium, France and the Netherlands; and particularly the Czech ČKD Tatra, who built the largest number of the PCC type in the world, supplying a number of Central and Eastern European countries. Trams such as the Tatra T3 and its variant Tatra T4, together the most numerous of any tram model ever produced, are still in service today in many of the regions where they were first introduced. Modern variants of the Tatra T3 are still produced today by some manufacturers, such as KOS Krnov. The Polish Konstal 13N was not built under license. Only models with direct references to the original American PCC streetcar are included here. Later models of a particular series such as the Tatra T5 were adapted and modernized further.

Model	Country	Introduced	Number built	
7000-series / 7700-series / 7900-series	Belgium	1951	125 (both models)	Single body PCCs for Antwerp and Ghent (bi-directional)
A28 number 11	West Germany	1951	1	
Konstal 13N	Poland	1959	842	
PCC 980	Australia	1949	1	
PCC A28	Sweden	1953	2	
Tatra T1	Czechoslovakia, Poland, Soviet Union (Russian SFSR)	1951	287	
Tatra T2	Czechoslovakia, Soviet Union (Russian SFSR, Ukrainian SSR)	1955	771	
Tatra T3	Czechoslovakia, East Germany, Romania, Soviet Union (Latvian SSR, Russian SFSR, Ukrainian SSR, Uzbek SSR), Yugoslavia	1962	14,113	
Tatra T4	East Germany, Romania, Soviet Union (Estonian SSR, Latvian SSR, Russian SFSR, Ukrainian SSR), Yugoslavia	1968	2,637	
TMBT number 5501	Japan	1954	1	

Note that the country listed only covers areas where the cars were initially delivered; references for these areas can be found in the text.

==== 7700-series/7900-series ====
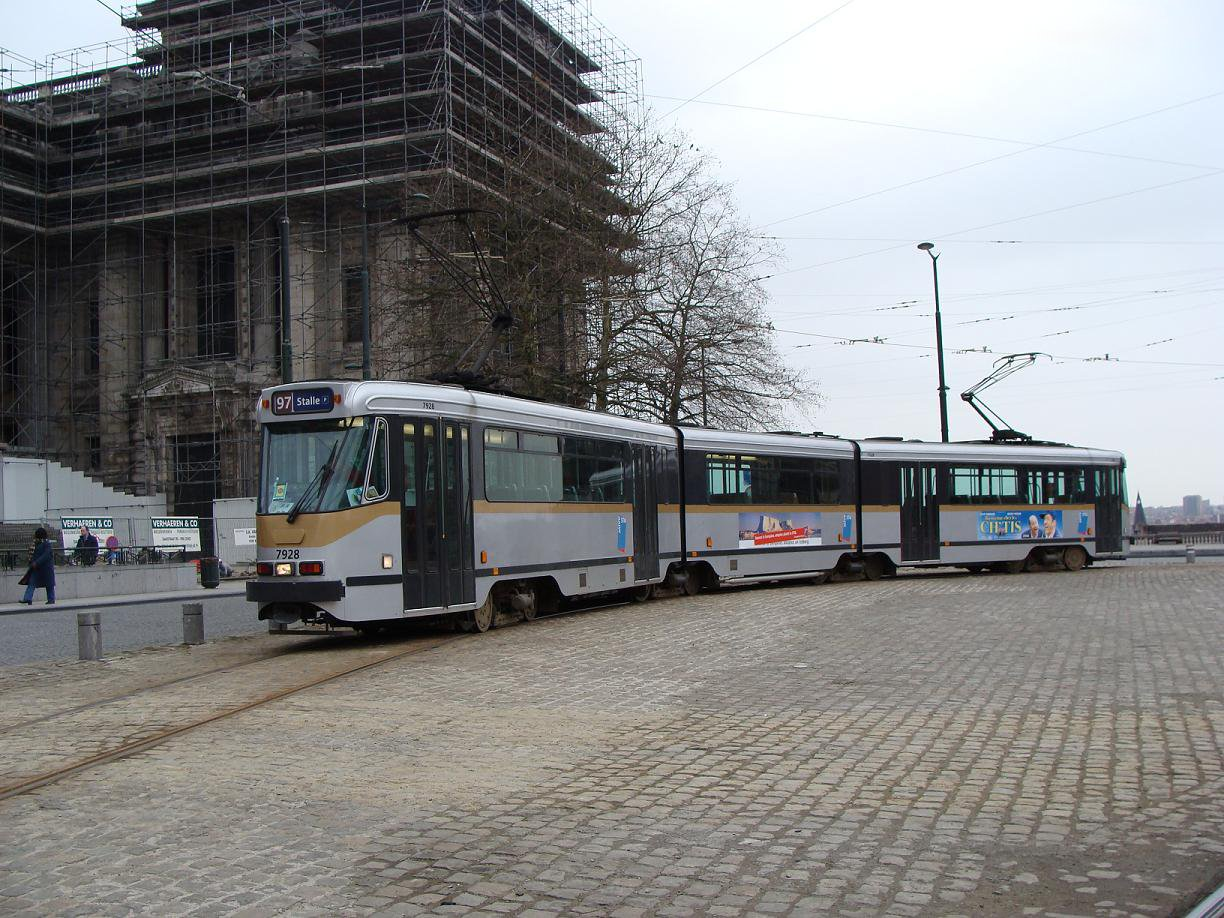
Brussels three-body series 7900: the longest PCC model in the world

Belgium; introduced 1951; number built: 125 (both models).

The first PCC cars in Brussels (series 7000–7100) were built in prevision of the Expo 58: they were single-body non-reversible two-bogie cars. Articulated trams arrived since 1965: first two-body non-reversible trams (series 7500) then two-body (series 7700–7800) and three-body (series 7900) reversible ones, the last one delivered in 1978. The last single-body PCC tram in commercial service in Brussels ran in February 2010. All series 7500 trams were converted to series 7700 by addition of a second steering post except the 7500 prototype which was versed to the collection of the Brussels Tram Museum. Two-body and three-body reversible PCC trams are still in regular service next to more modern low-floor trams. All these articulated PCC cars use Jacobs bogies under the articulations (see example at right).

Brussels tramways use standard gauge (1.435 m); metre-gauge PCC trams are in use in Ghent and Antwerp.

==== A28 number 11 ====
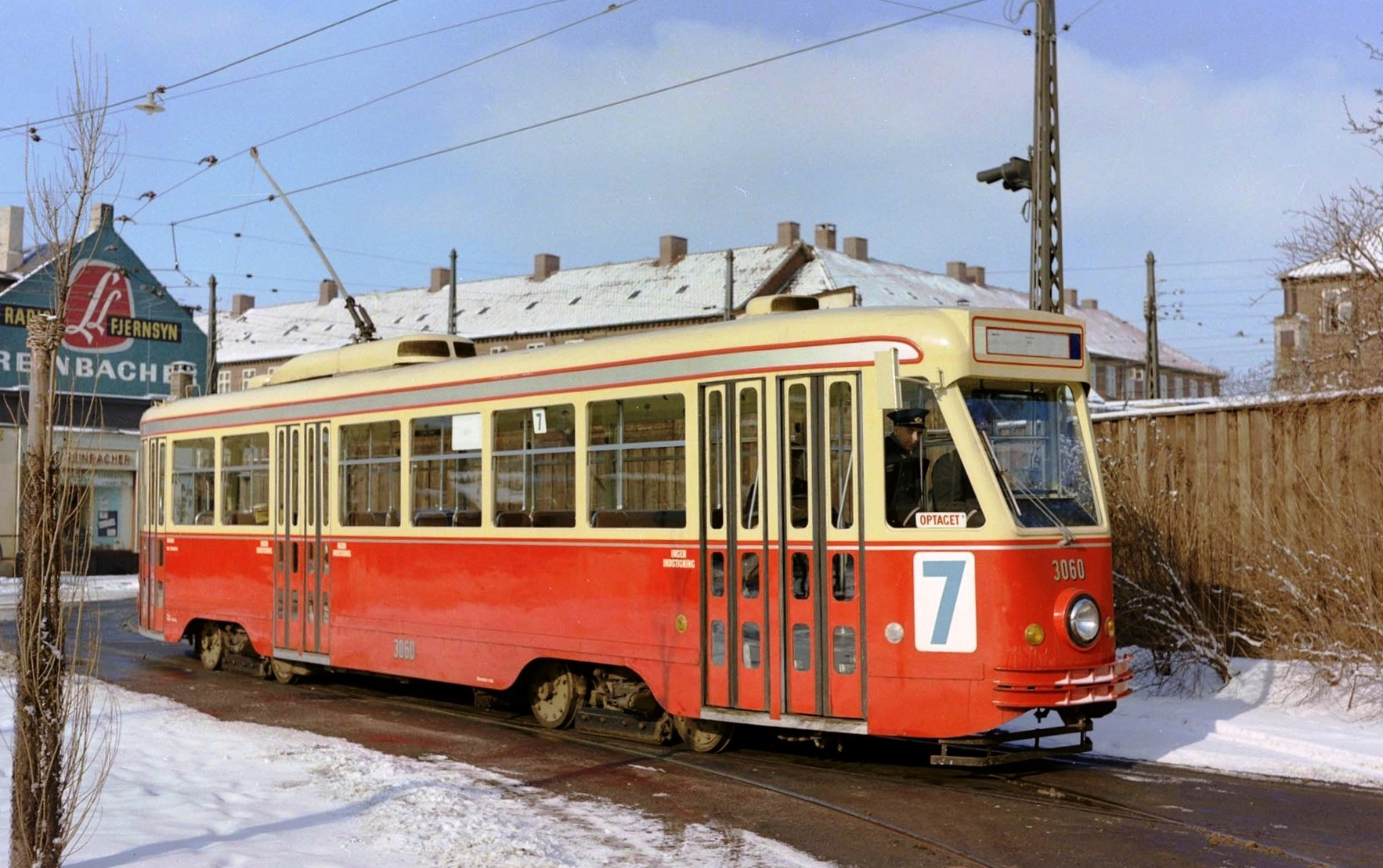

West Germany; introduced 1951; number built: 1.
The only PCC in West Germany was delivered from La Brugeoise to Hamburg in 1951. The car was sold to Brussels in 1957. Returned to Hamburg in 1995, where it was used as a historical tram in the VVM Schönberger Strand museum. In 1999, the tram was sold to the Danish tram museum of Skjoldenæsholm.

==== Konstal 13N ====
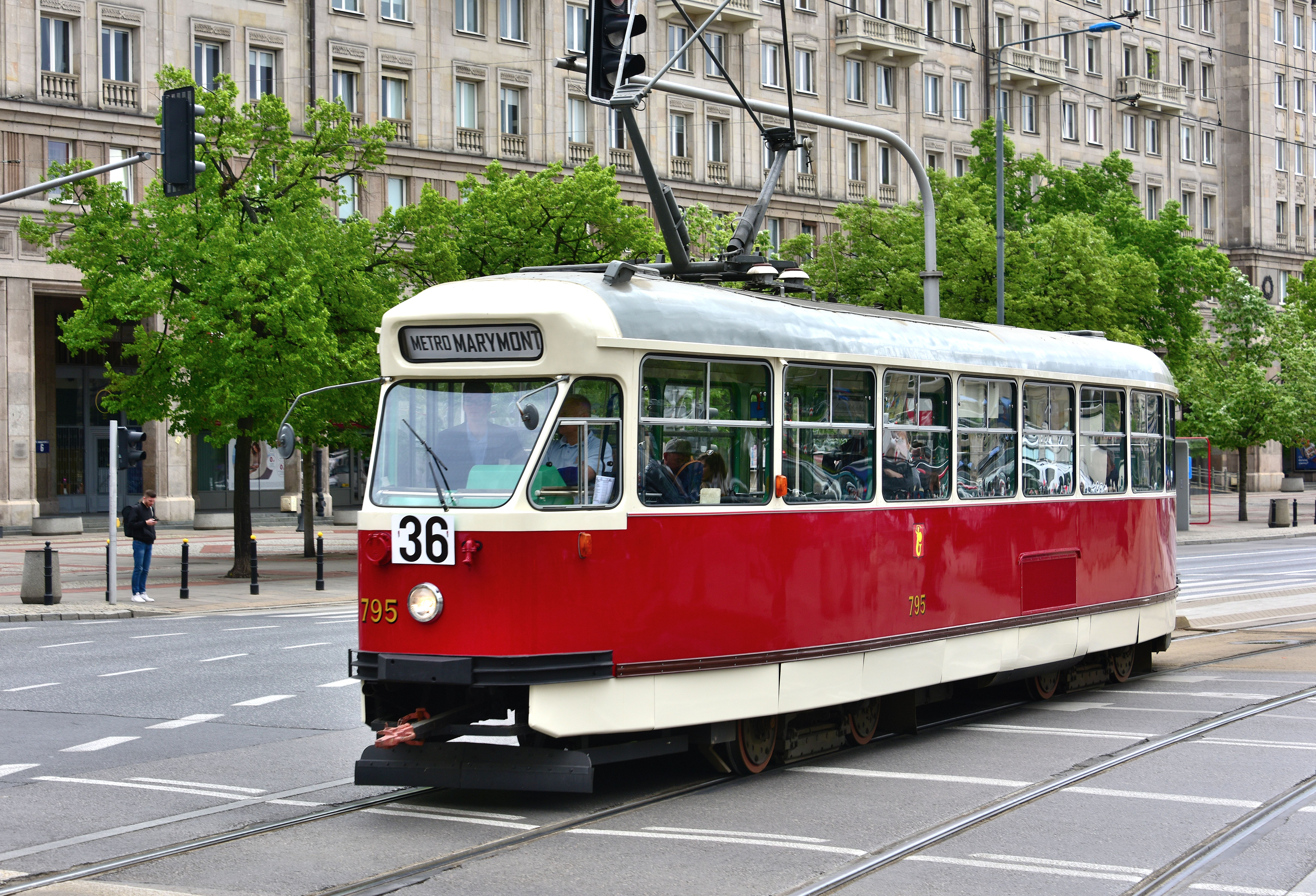

Poland; introduced 1959; number built: 842.
These trams were used in Poland from 1959 to their retirement in 2012. Several remain as maintenance cars, while others have been preserved in museums. Konstal 13Ns were not produced under a PCC licence.

==== PCC 980 ====
Australia; introduced 1949; number built: 1.
One set of PCC bogies and control equipment was imported into Melbourne circa 1949 and fitted to a modified W class body. Additional cars were planned, but never built. The single car was numbered 980, and was withdrawn from service in 1971. Z Class tram prototype car 1041 was built in 1972 using bogies salvaged from 980.

==== PCC A28 ====
Sweden; introduced 1953; number built: 2.
Only two of the planned 300 of the PCC A28 type trams had been delivered to Stockholm by ASJ in 1953. This was probably due to the withdrawal of the Polish side of the contract in 1946, which primarily stated the delivery not only of the tram wagons, but also 8 locomotives and 44 electric passenger trains by the ASEA company. The only ones that were built, based on bogies and the electrical system delivered from the USA. They were the first PCCs in Europe equipped with multiple-unit electrical systems and were only used in pairs (no more trams of this type were constructed) on tourist line number 700. In 1962, the routes were converted to buses. One of the two cars was scrapped, the other one (number 11) is preserved in the Tramway Museum of Malmkoping.

==== Tatra T1 ====
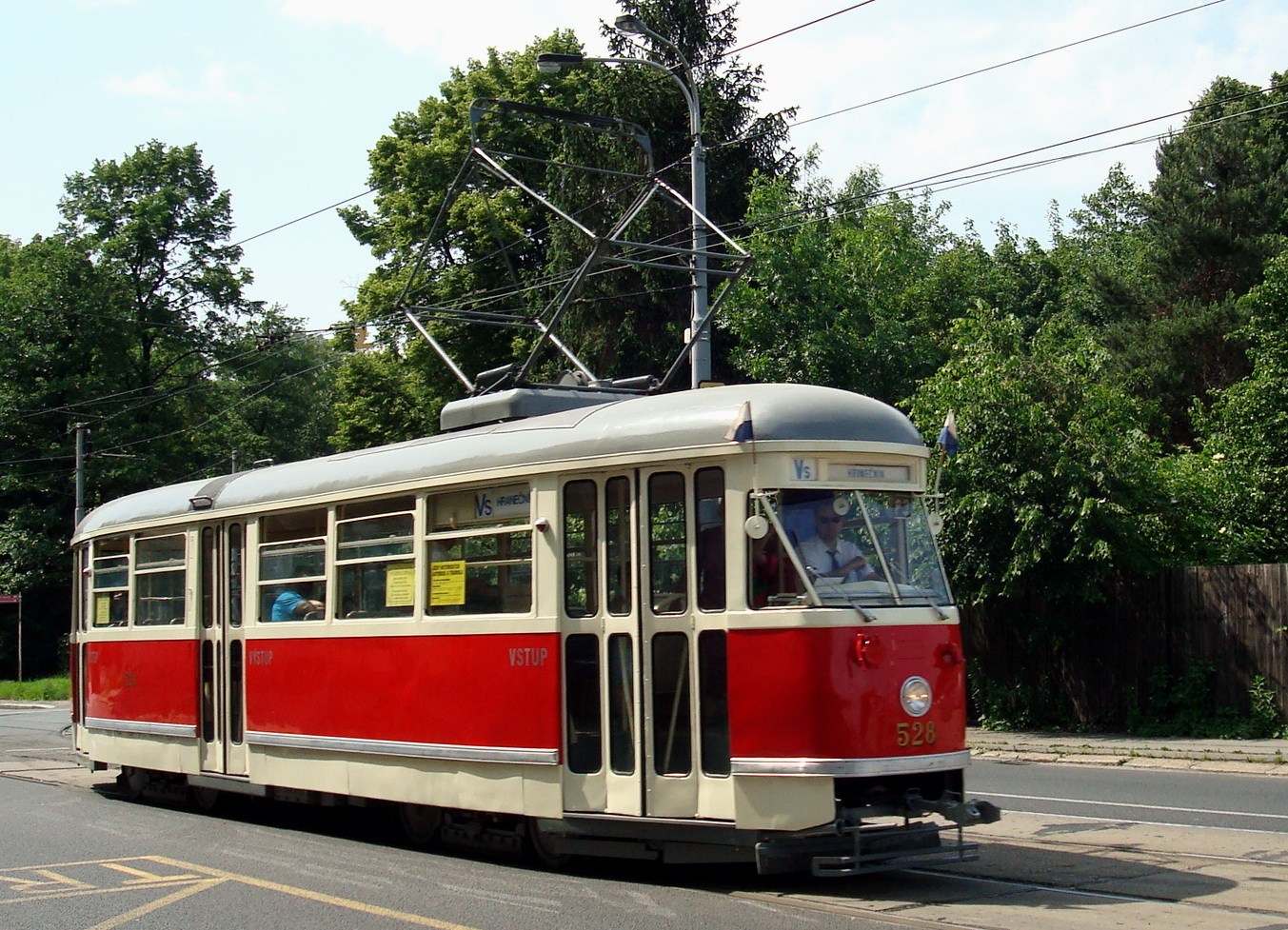

Czechoslovakia, Poland, Soviet Union (Russian SFSR); introduced 1951; number built: 287.

==== Tatra T2 ====
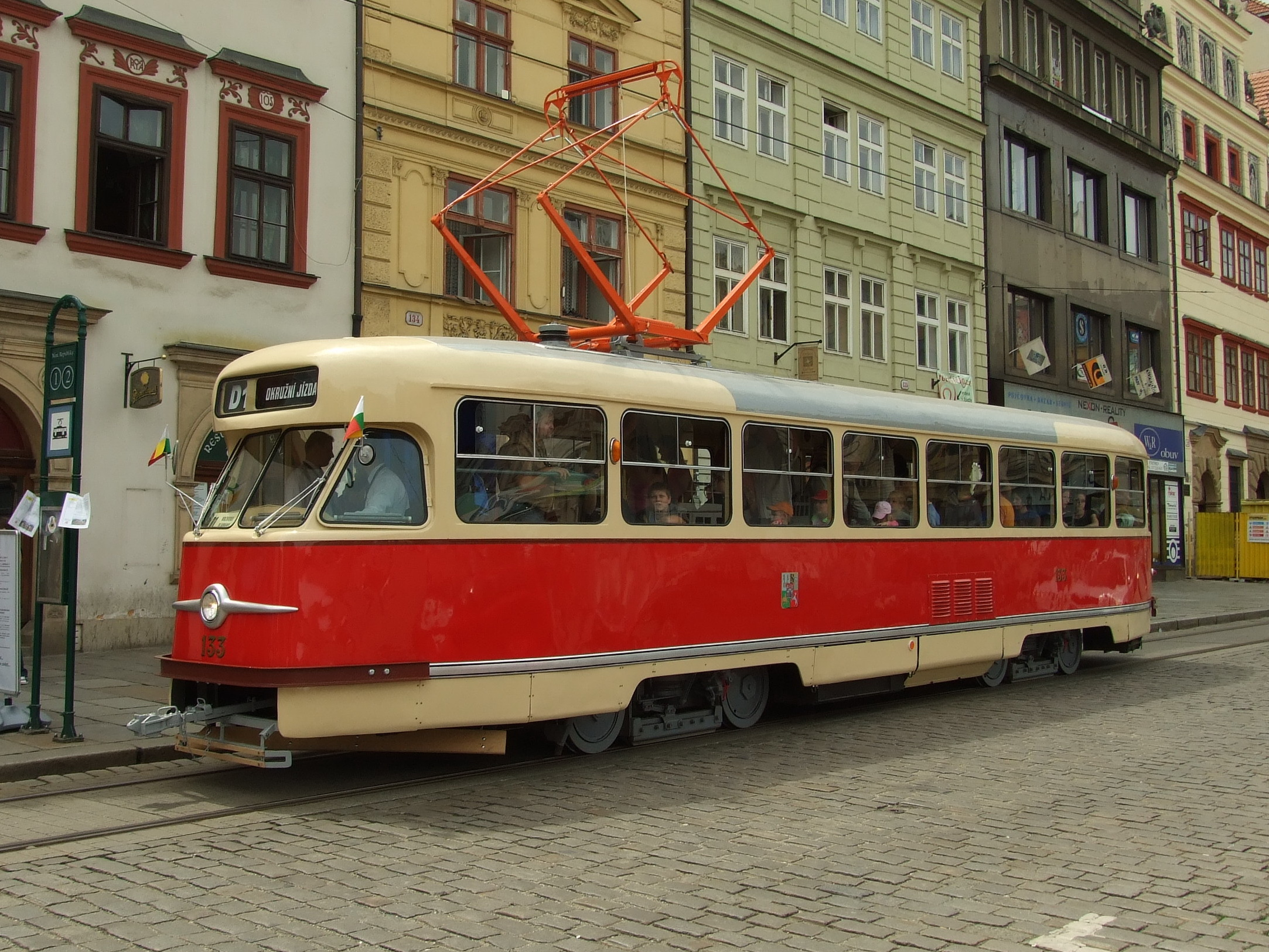

Czechoslovakia, Soviet Union (Russian SFSR, Ukrainian SSR); introduced 1955; number built: 771.

==== Tatra T3 ====
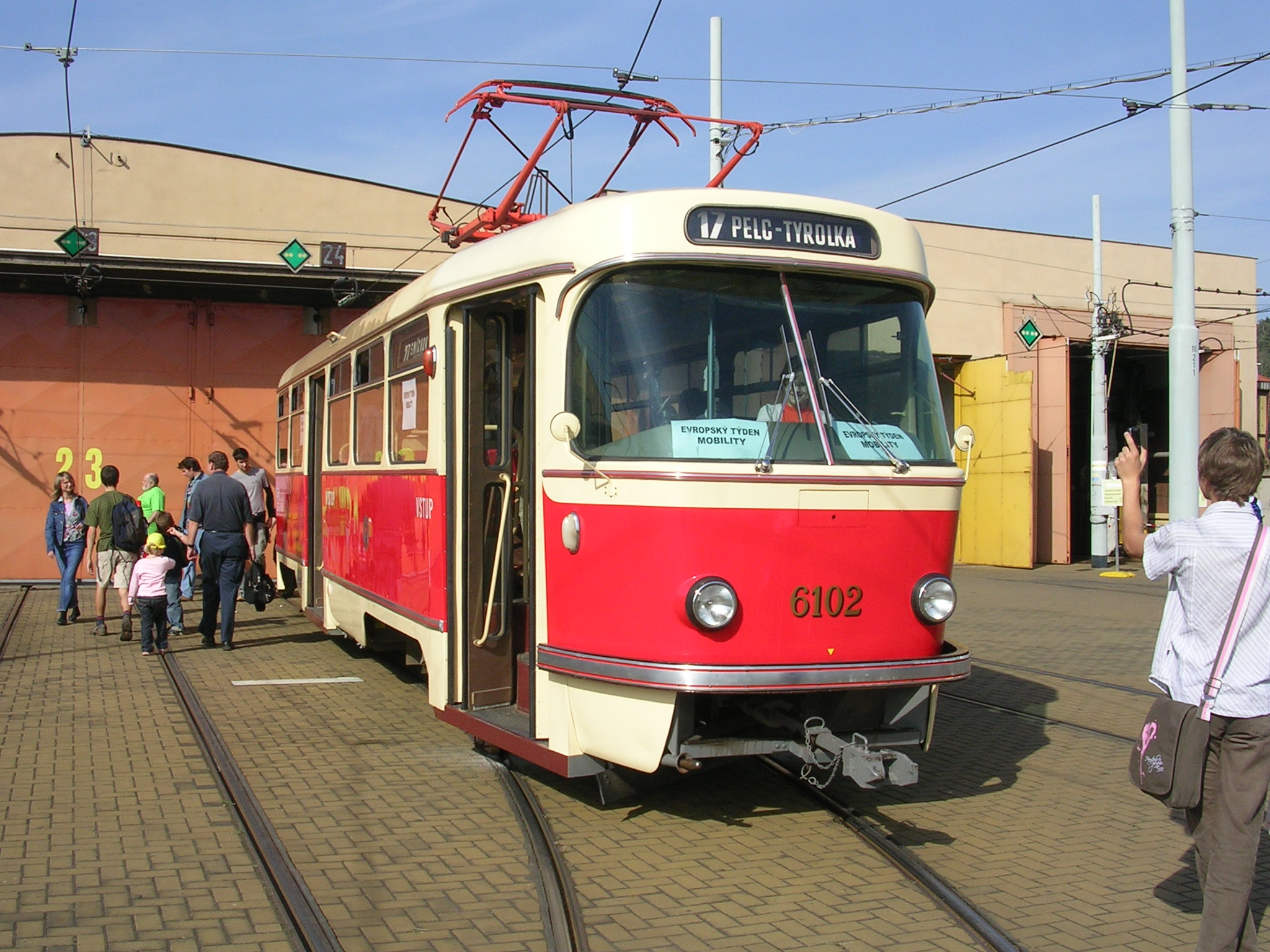

Czechoslovakia, East Germany, Romania, Soviet Union (Latvian SSR, Russian SFSR, Ukrainian SSR, Uzbek SSR), Yugoslavia; introduced 1962; number built: 14,113.

==== Tatra T4 ====
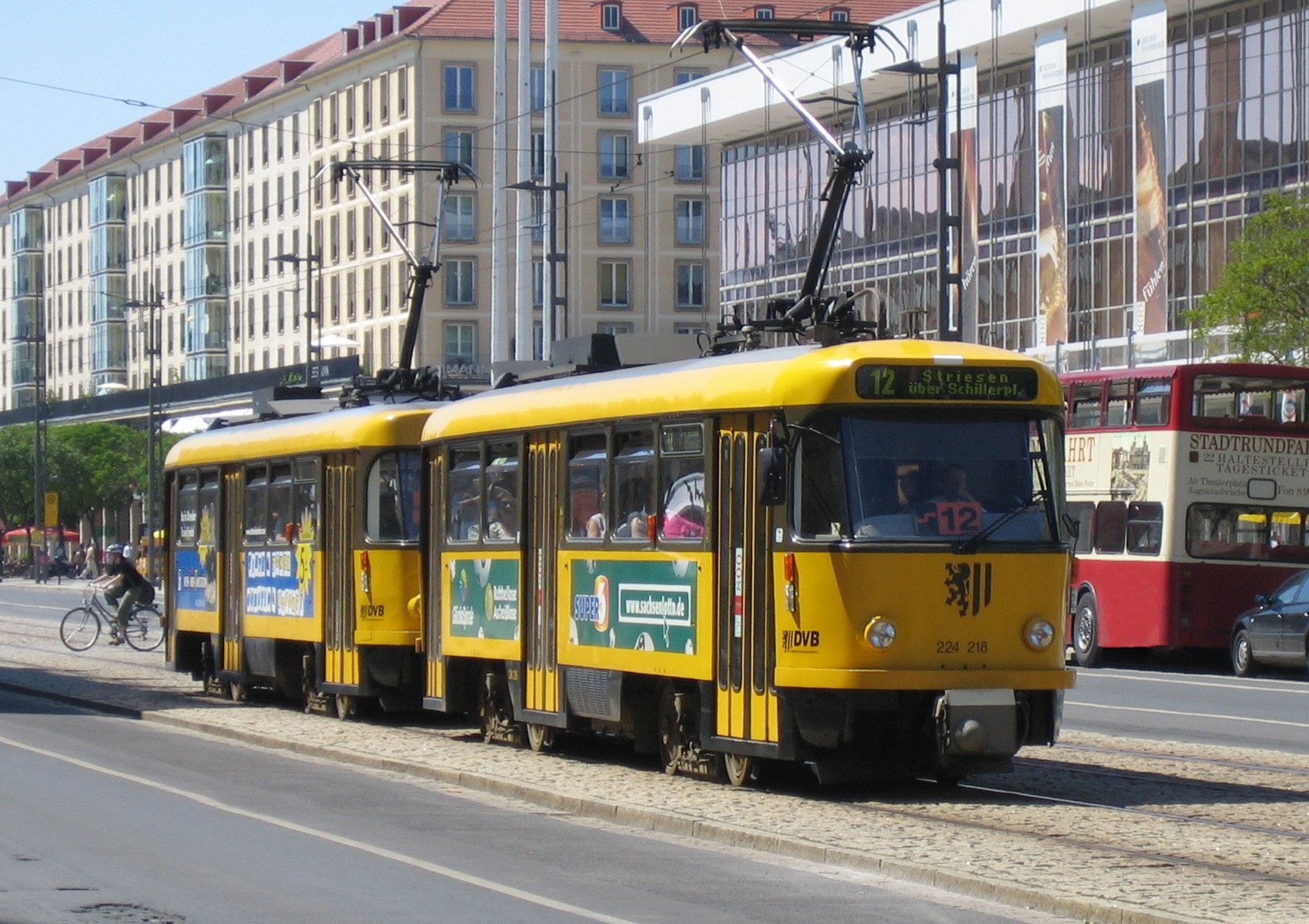

East Germany, Romania, Soviet Union (Estonian SSR, Latvian SSR, Russian SFSR, Ukrainian SSR), Yugoslavia; introduced 1968; number built: 2,637.

==== TMBT number 5501 ====
Japan; introduced 1954; number built: 1.
The TMBT (Tokyo Metropolitan Bureau of Transportation) wanted to modernize its streetcar, so ordered one PCC car to Naniwa Koki Company (later Alna Sharyo Company in Hankyu Hanshin Holdings) in Osaka in 1953. Sumitomo Metal Industries as bogie manufacturer, and Mitsubishi Electric Corporation that had the electric motor licensee from Westinghouse Electric Corporation, also participated in the project. The streetcar was completed in 1954 with number 5501. The class 5500 was extended with other six cars (5502–5507), but these were called no real PCC cars because of their different configuration.

== See also ==
- Brilliner – a competing streetcar design
- Two spiritual successors developed by UMTA the 1970s
  - State-of-the-Art Car (SOAC) – demonstrated contemporary technologies for use in rapid transit systems
  - US Standard Light Rail Vehicle (SLRV) – designed as a replacement for PCCs and intended to modernize legacy streetcar systems
- KTM-1 and MTV-82 – similarly standardized and mass-produced trams in the Soviet Union
- Streetcars in North America
