= Gaslamp Quarter station =

San Diego Trolley station

Gaslamp Quarter
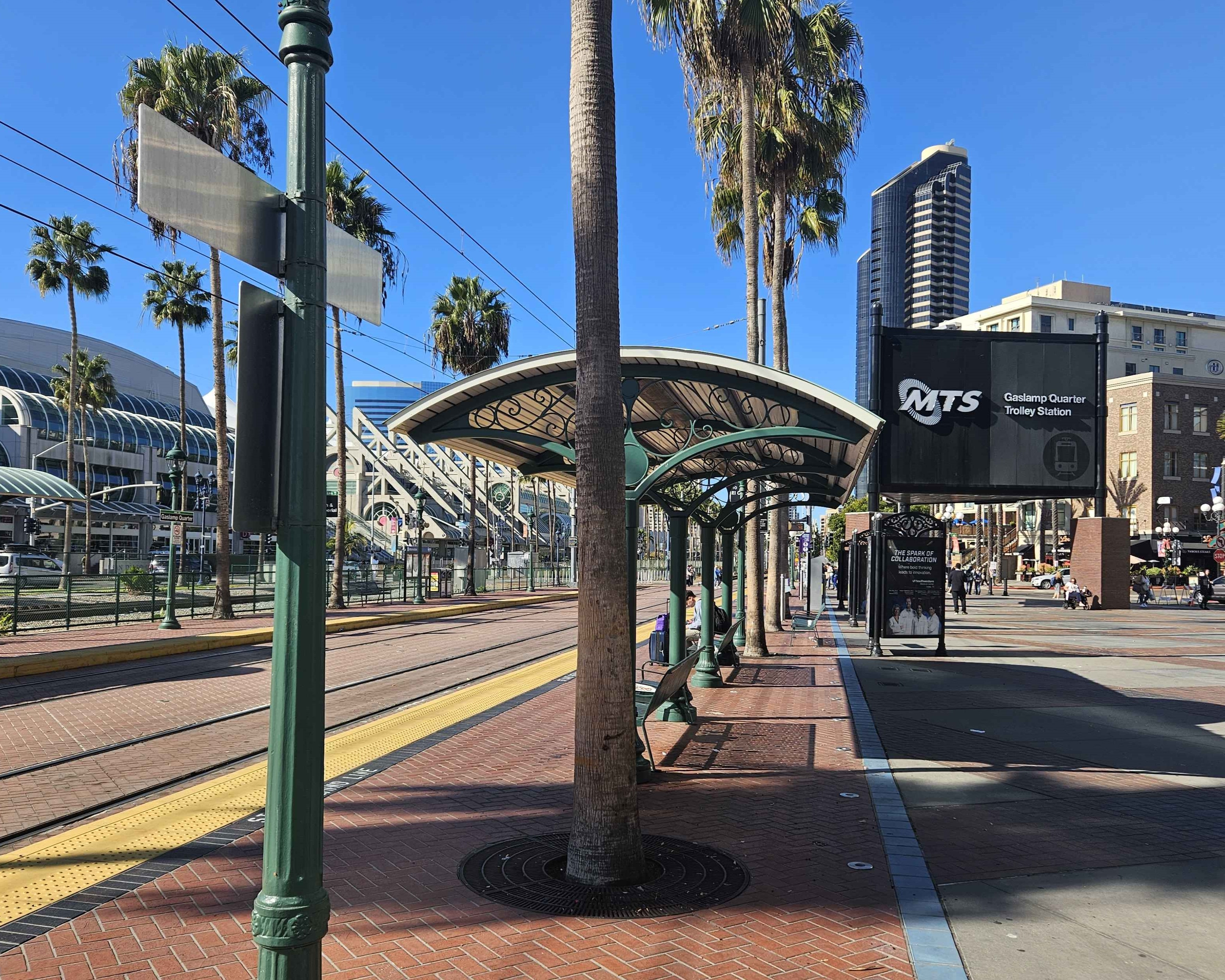
- The station as seen from the north side platform

General information
- Location: 105 6th Avenue; San Diego, California; United States
- Coordinates: 32°42′25″N 117°09′33″W
- Owner: San Diego Metropolitan Transit System
- Operator: San Diego Trolley
- Line: Bayside Corridor
- Platforms: 2 side platforms
- Tracks: 3

Construction
- Structure type: At-grade
- Accessible: Disabled access

Other information
- Station code: 75098, 75099

History
- Opened: May 3, 1990 (weekend service only); June 30, 1990 (fully opened)
- Rebuilt: 2013

Services
Preceding station	San Diego Trolley	Following station
12th & Imperial Terminus	Green Line	Convention Center toward El Cajon
12th & Imperial Terminus	Special Event Line	Convention Center toward Balboa Avenue
12th & Imperial One-way operation	Silver Line	Convention Center Next clockwise
Former services
Preceding station	San Diego Trolley	Following station
12th & Imperial Terminus	Orange Line 2005-2012	Convention Center toward Gillespie Field
12th & Imperial Terminus	Special Event Line pre-2012	Convention Center toward Qualcomm Stadium
Location

Gaslamp Quarter station is a station of the Green and Silver Lines on the San Diego Trolley. It is located between Harbor Drive and L Street, and Fifth and Sixth Avenues, in the Gaslamp Quarter section of the city and serves the surrounding trendy neighborhood. A variety of entertainment destinations and restaurants, as well as Petco Park, are accessible from the station.

This station was partly opened on May 3, 1990 for weekend service from the Convention Center to 12th & Imperial. It was fully opened June 30, 1990 as part of the Orange Line's (then called the East Line) Bayside Extension; it should not be confused with the original Gaslamp (North) station that opened in 1981 and was permanently renamed the Fifth Avenue station in 1986.

The station remained open while undergoing renovations from February through July 2013, as part of the Trolley Renewal Project.

On September 2, 2012, service to this station by the Orange Line was replaced by the Green Line as part of a system redesign.

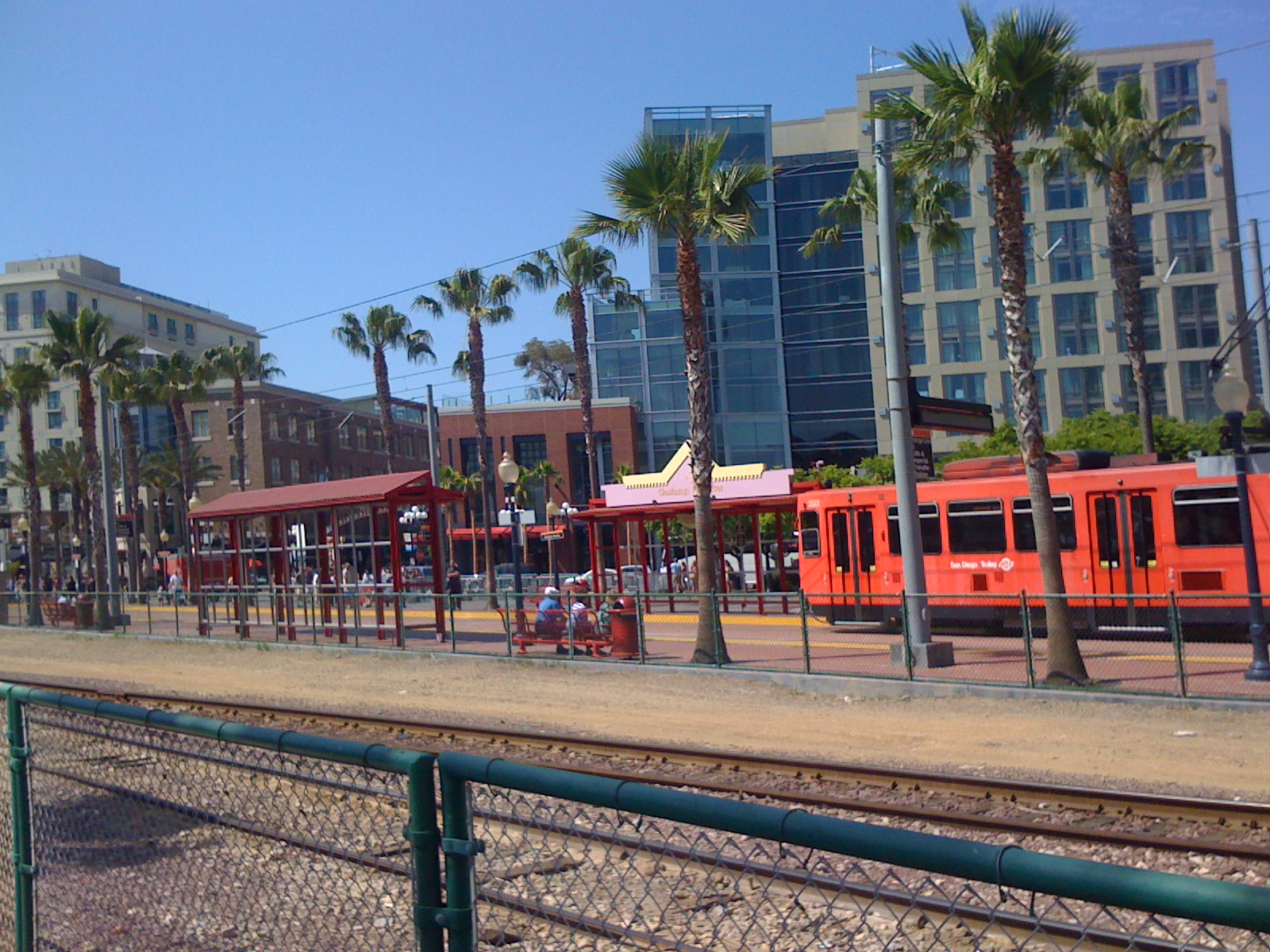
Gaslamp Quarter Station prior to Trolley Renewal

== Station layout ==
There are two tracks, each with a side platform. A third track handles freight operations, and Coaster trains heading to and from the yard.

== See also ==
- List of San Diego Trolley stations
