= Seaport Village station =

San Diego Trolley station

Seaport Village
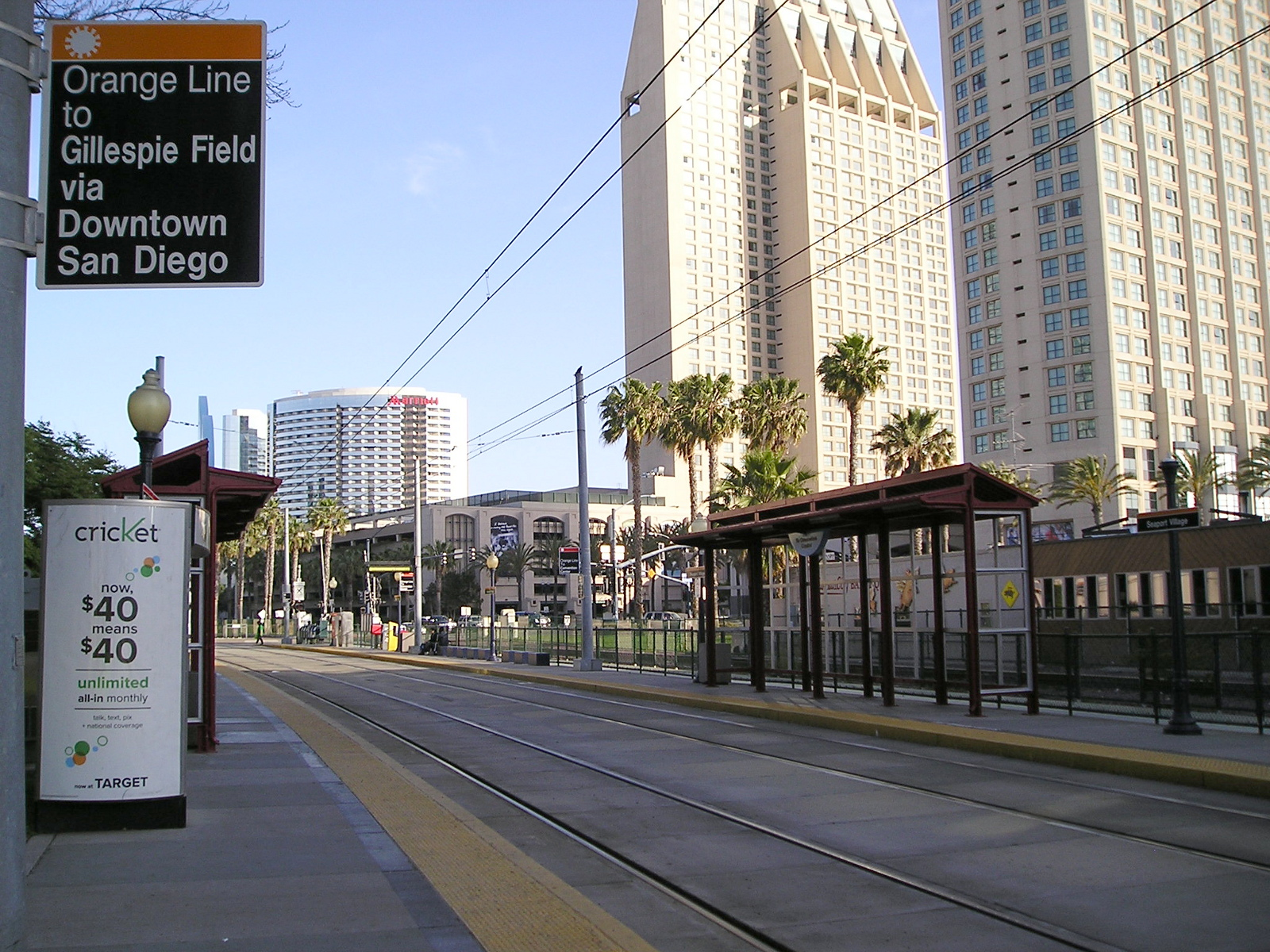
- The station platforms in April 2010 when it was served by the Orange Line

General information
- Location: 530 West Market Street; San Diego, California; United States
- Coordinates: 32°42′41″N 117°10′03″W
- Owner: San Diego Metropolitan Transit System
- Operator: San Diego Trolley
- Line: Bayside Corridor
- Platforms: 2 side platforms
- Tracks: 3
- Connections: FlixBus

Construction
- Structure type: At-grade
- Accessible: Disabled access

Other information
- Station code: 75094, 75095

History
- Opened: June 30, 1990
- Rebuilt: July 2012

Services
Preceding station	San Diego Trolley	Following station
Convention Center toward 12th & Imperial	Green Line	Santa Fe Depot toward El Cajon
Convention Center toward 12th & Imperial	Special Event Line	Santa Fe Depot toward Balboa Avenue
Convention Center One-way operation	Silver Line	America Plaza Next clockwise
Former services
Preceding station	San Diego Trolley	Following station
Convention Center toward 12th & Imperial	Orange Line 2005-2012	America Plaza toward Gillespie Field
Convention Center toward 12th & Imperial	Special Event Line pre-2012	Santa Fe Depot toward Qualcomm Stadium
Location

Seaport Village station is a station of the Green and Silver Lines on the San Diego Trolley in San Diego, California. It runs diagonally between the intersections of Harbor Drive and Market Street, and Kettner Boulevard and G Street, in the Marina district of the city. Seaport Village, a shopping and entertainment complex, is adjacent to the station. This station was opened on June 30, 1990 as part of the Orange Line's (then called the East Line) Bayside Extension.

Seaport Village is where the Green and the Silver lines split. The Silver Line turns east towards America Plaza as part of its clockwise circular route around downtown San Diego, while the Green Line moves north towards Santa Fe Depot on its route through Old Town Transit Center to east county and Santee.

The station was closed from July 9 through October 8, 2012 to undergo renovations as part of the Trolley Renewal Project.

On September 2, 2012, service to this station by the Orange Line was replaced by the Green Line as part of a system redesign.

== Station layout ==
There are two tracks, each with a side platform. A third track handles freight operations on the line. Silver Line heritage service operates Friday through Sunday only.

== See also ==
- List of San Diego Trolley stations
