= Birmingham Railway and Electric Company =

The Birmingham Railway and Electric Company was both a streetcar and electricity provider in Birmingham, Alabama, US.

Created in 1890 after the consolidation of several street railway operators, including the Birmingham Street Railway:

- Highland Avenue and Belt Railroad 1885-1890
- East Lake Land Company 1886-1890
- East Birmingham Land Company 1887-1890
- Bessemer and Birmingham Railroad 1887-1890
- Enselt Company 1887-1890

In 1940, BREC became Birmingham Electric Company.

The company faced increased pressure from car after World War II and ridership declined. By the 1950s streetcar operations gave way to bus service in the city. Forty-seven streamlined PCC streetcars, which went into service in 1947, were sold to the Toronto Transit Commission in 1953.

BEC changed its name to Birmingham Transit Company in 1951. In 1972, the Birmingham-Jefferson County Transit Authority took over public transit operations.

== Fleet ==
=== 1950s ===
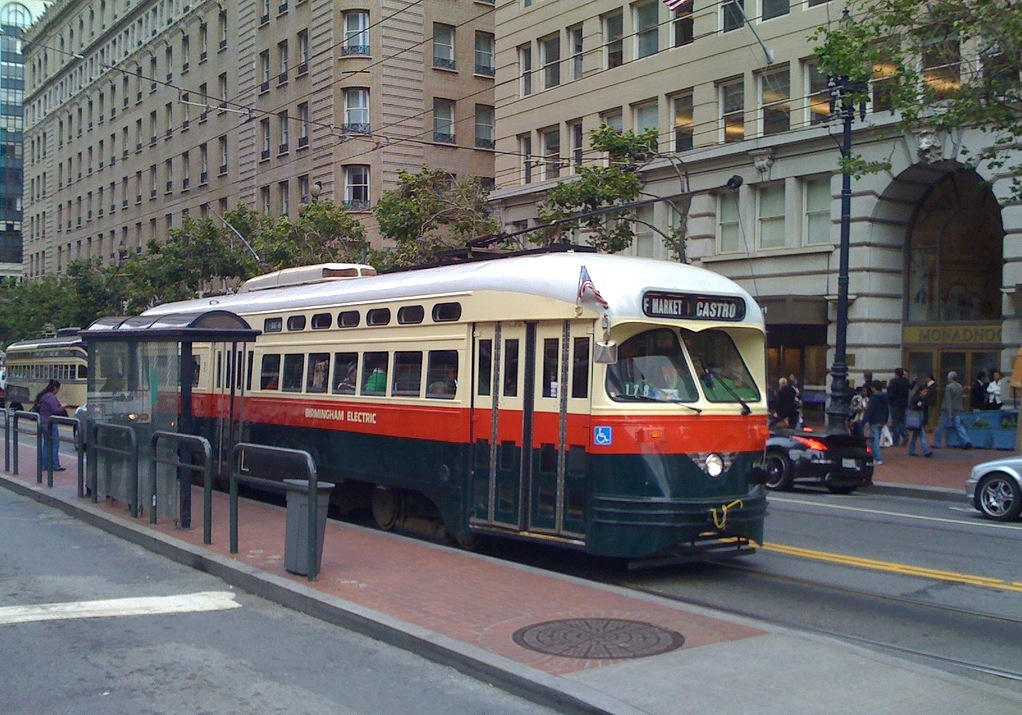
A PCC streetcar in San Francisco in 2010 wearing the paint scheme of the Birmingham Electric Company. The car is ex-Newark, ex-Minneapolis, and never operated in Birmingham.

In addition to a variety of older cars kept in service, BEC ordered 47 PCC streetcars, at a cost of $25,000 each, from Pullman Standard in 1947. Birmingham's cars were the 17425 model and were manufactured at the Osgood Bradley plant in Worcester, Massachusetts. The interiors were three shades of green with coffee-colored leather upholstery, stainless steel seat backs and chrome trim. The cars entered service on August 31, 1947. The exterior color scheme was updated to navy blue skirts with cream above, separated by a scarlet stripe.
