= Silver Line (San Diego Trolley) =

Heritage streetcar line in San Diego, California

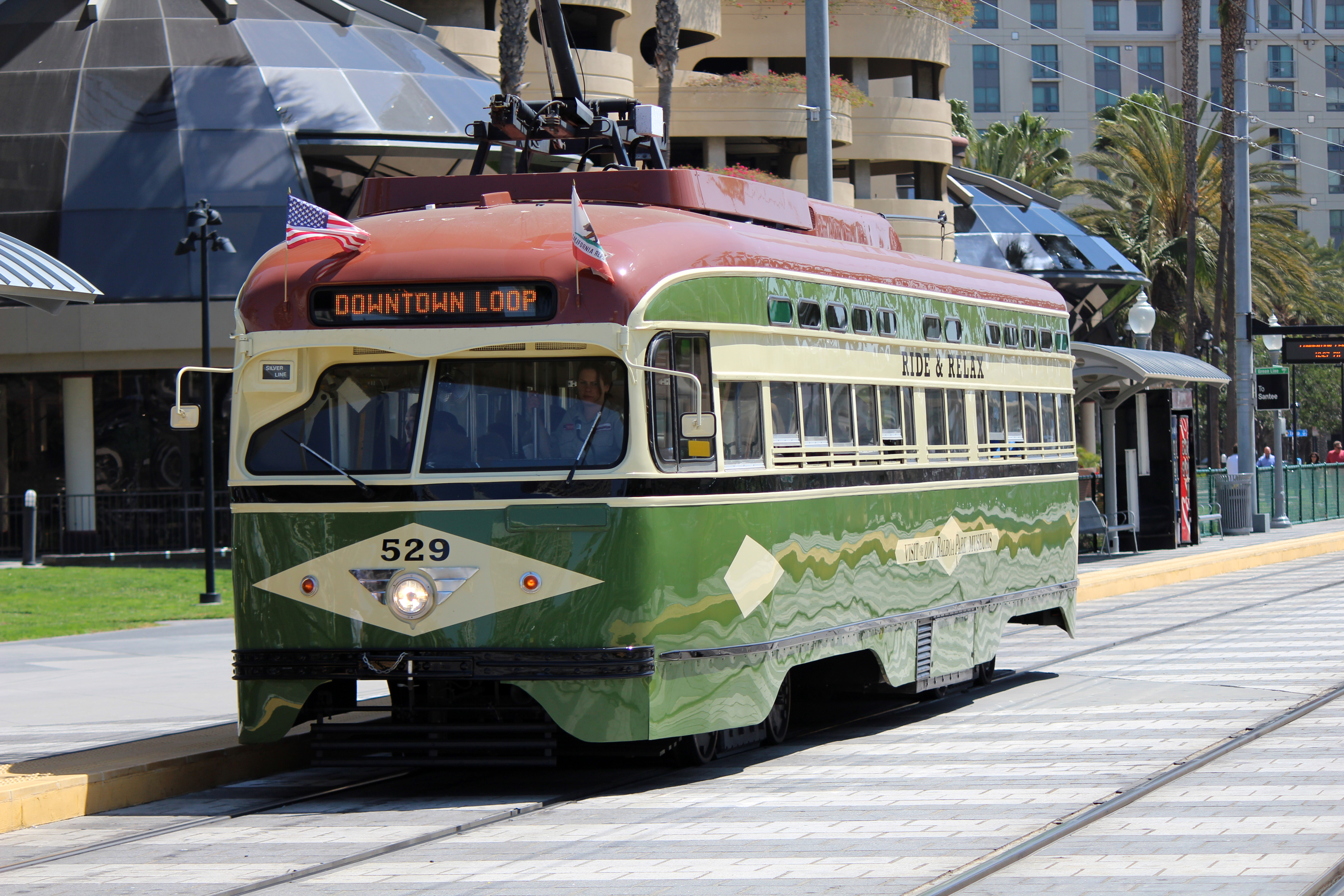
- Car 529 at Convention Center station (March 2014).

Overview
- Status: Operating holidays
- Owner: Metropolitan Transit System
- Locale: San Diego, California
- Termini: 12th & Imperial
- Stations: 9
- Website: San Diego Vintage Trolley

Service
- Type: Heritage streetcar
- System: San Diego Trolley
- Route number: 550 (in internal documents only) (Note: For example, the link www.sdmts.com/getting-around/departures-and-schedules/schedules/550 (with the numbers at the end being a route number) leads to the schedule for the Silver Line.)
- Operator(s): San Diego Trolley, Inc.
- Rolling stock: 2 PCC streetcars; 1 Siemens–Duewag U2
- Ridership: 2,098 (FY 2022)

History
- Opened: August 27, 2011; 14 years ago

Technical
- Line length: 2.7 mi (4.3 km)
- Number of tracks: Travels on only 1 track of 2
- Character: Unidirectional clockwise at-grade loop around Downtown San Diego
- Track gauge: 4 ft 8 1/2 in (1,435 mm) standard gauge
- Electrification: Overhead line, 600 V DC
- Operating speed: 45 mph (72 km/h) (max)
Route map
Silver Line highlighted in Silver

The Silver Line is a 2.7-mile (4.3 km) heritage streetcar line operated by the San Diego Trolley, an operating division of the San Diego Metropolitan Transit System (MTS). It operates on a "downtown loop", a circle of tracks around downtown San Diego, and is operated using renovated historic vehicles. The line is one of five lines in the trolley system, sharing tracks with other lines; the other four lines are the Blue, Orange, Green, and Copper lines.

== History ==
The Silver Line is the fourth line in the San Diego Trolley system as well as the first circular route, with service beginning in 2011. Planning for the Silver Line dates back to the early 1990s, upon the completion of the Downtown Loop, consideration was given to providing a downtown trolley service that circles around the loop. MTS (then MTDB) originally considered using three Vienna Class N1 cars formerly used on the Stadtbahn in the Austrian city of Vienna, but their age and limited power proved incompatible with the present trolley system, and renovations to make them so were considered unfeasible.

Eventually, in 2005, MTS would settle on using PCC streetcars, which were formerly used by the San Diego Electric Railway, San Diego's former transit service, in the 1930s and 40s. Between 2005 and 2010, MTS acquired six PCC streetcars formerly used in San Francisco and Philadelphia, and would partner with the San Diego historic streetcar society, a non-profit organization developed to educate the public of the history of the San Diego Electric Railway, to help restore these streetcars for use on the eventual line.

In early 2011 the first of these streetcars, Car 529, was completed and the inauguration of the Silver Line was held on August 27, 2011. Restoring this car for use in the trolley system required over 3,000 volunteer hours and $850,000 in donations. For the first two weeks of the vintage trolley's run, riders who boarded at 12th & Imperial Transit Center received "commemorative tickets" to use for boarding the trolley. Due to the limited number of streetcars, initial service for the line was limited to weekends and holidays every 30 minutes between the hours of 10 am to 2 pm. On December 20, 2011, service was expanded to Tuesdays and Thursdays from 10 am to 2 pm as well as weekends and holidays from 11 am to 3:30 pm. It was expected that more service hours would be added upon the completion of additional streetcars.

In 2015, the line was renamed the SDG&E Silver Line after San Diego Gas & Electric (SDG&E) provided a grant to help restore streetcar number 530. However, this is no longer the case. The utility company also sponsors a 3rd-grade history curriculum that includes free rides on the line.

From April 12, 2020, until July 2021, all Silver line operations were suspended after five bus operators ended up testing positive for COVID-19. The Silver Line returned for public service on Saturdays and Sundays on July 3, 2021 after more than a year of non-operation.

== Operations ==
Due to the limited number of streetcars, service for the line as of January 2024 only operates every hour on select holidays from 9:07 am (pull out) and 5:07 pm (pull in).

=== Ridership ===
Due to its limited days and hours of operation, and due to some service interruptions throughout 2014, the Silver Line transported just 29,104 riders during FY 2014. In FY 2015, 32,944 riders rode the Silver Line according to the MTS.

== Stations ==
As the heritage PCC streetcars are single-ended, the Silver Line operates one-way in a clockwise-only rotation around downtown San Diego.

Station	Location	Connections
12th & Imperial	East Village, San Diego	Blue Line, Green Line and Orange Line; MTS: 4, 12, 901, 929; FlixBus; Greyhound Lines; Park and ride: 1,020 spaces, paid
Gaslamp Quarter	Gaslamp Quarter, San Diego	Green Line
Convention Center	Marina, San Diego	Green Line
Seaport Village	Marina, San Diego	Green Line; FlixBus
America Plaza	Core, San Diego	Blue Line; Pacific Surfliner (at Santa Fe Depot); Coaster (at Santa Fe Depot); MTS: 83, Rapid 215, Rapid 225, Rapid 235, Rapid Express 280, Rapid Express 290, 923, 992
Civic Center	Core, San Diego	Blue Line and Orange Line
Fifth Avenue	Core, San Diego	Blue Line and Orange Line; MTS: 3, 120
City College	East Village, San Diego	Blue Line and Orange Line; MTS: 2, 5, 7, 12, 20, 110, Rapid 215, Rapid 225, Rapid 235, Rapid Express 280, Rapid Express 290, 992
Park & Market	East Village, San Diego	Blue Line and Orange Line; MTS: 3, 5

== Rolling stock ==
The Silver Line began service in August 2011 with one operational heritage 1946 Presidents Conference Committee (PCC) streetcar, Car #529. The vehicle had pantograph current collection equipment added, as the overhead power lines that MTS operates are not compatible with trolley poles that the PCC streetcars were originally equipped with. The car retained its trolley poles, however, for visual effect.

In March 2014, MTS took possession of a second 1946 Presidents Conference Committee (PCC) streetcar, destined to join the Silver Line fleet as Car #530. Restoration work on this trolley car, aided by a grant from San Diego Gas & Electric, took one year, and Car #530 entered service on the Silver Line on March 2, 2015, as part of the centennial celebrations for Balboa Park.

The first San Diego Trolley vehicle, Siemens–Duewag U2 unit 1001, has also been restored for use on the Silver Line. It was unveiled on July 11, 2019.

Legend
Color Key
In service	Stored	Scrapped	Preserved

Image	Fleet number	Model	Built	Heritage	Tenure on SDTI	Status
Current Silver Line trolleys
	529	PCC streetcar	1946	Ex-MUNI 1122, nee-SLPS 1716.	2011-present	On the roster
	530	PCC streetcar	1946	Ex-Rockhill Trolley Museum, nee-Baltimore Streetcar Museum, nee-PSCT/TNJ/NJT 10, nee-TCRT 329	2015-present	On the roster
	1001	Siemens-Duewag U2	1980	First car of the San Diego Trolley	1981-2015; 2019-present	On the roster
Unused trolleys
	6888	Vienna Class N-1	1954	ex-Vienna Stadtbahn NH 6888, NH 6890, and NH 6891, nee- 2882, 2950 and 2951	1992-2005	Donated to the San Diego Electric Railway Association in 2005
	6890	Vienna Class N-1	1954	ex-Vienna Stadtbahn NH 6888, NH 6890, and NH 6891, nee- 2882, 2950 and 2951	1992-2005	Donated to the San Diego Electric Railway Association in 2005
	6891	Vienna Class N-1	1954	ex-Vienna Stadtbahn NH 6888, NH 6890, and NH 6891, nee- 2882, 2950 and 2951	1992-2005	Donated to the San Diego Electric Railway Association in 2005
	530 (Note: Not to be confused with the SDVTI 530 that entered service in 2015)	PCC streetcar	1945	ex-MUNI 1123, nee-SLPS 1728.		Not restored; used for parts for cars 529 and 530; subsequently scrapped.
	531	PCC streetcar	1946	ex-MUNI 1170, nee-SLPS 1777	2006-2013	Donated to the San Diego Electric Railway Association in 2013, now numbered "SDER 539".
	532	PCC streetcar	1948	Ex-PTC/SEPTA 2186		Not restored. It was renumbered to 531 in around 2014 as part of unimplemented plans to restore it. It has since been scrapped.
	533	PCC streetcar	1947	Ex-PTC/SEPTA 2785		Used as spare parts car; currently extant.

=== Additional streetcars ===
MTS had longer-term plans to restore an additional five PCC streetcars to expand heritage streetcar service operations. Car #531, a former SEPTA PCC manufactured in 1948, has also been funded for restoration at the MTS PCC shop, but has not made its debut on the line yet. Two of the stored PCC streetcars have since been scrapped as of 2024.

== Future ==
One of the future proposals for trolley expansion is to potentially extend the Silver Line from Downtown up towards Balboa Park and the Uptown communities. MTS began work in March 2011 on a study to evaluate the feasibility of reconnecting Balboa Park, the San Diego Zoo and Downtown San Diego through a fixed-guideway, electrified 1.5-mile (2.4 km) streetcar line. The project study corridor runs between the City College Trolley Station area, and Balboa Park, in the vicinity of the San Diego Zoo. An alignment similar to the proposed one was last served by a streetcar system in 1949 on Line 7 (Park Boulevard-University Avenue to East San Diego) & Line 11 (Park Boulevard-Adams Avenue to Kensington).

In October 2012, MTS released a study to evaluate the feasibility of reconnecting Balboa Park and downtown San Diego via an electrified streetcar corridor. The main issue is crossing the I-5 highway. There is insufficient space between the north-south lanes of Park Boulevard to insert two tracks, and the existing structure is not strong enough to bear the weight of a full LRV were the line extended further north into the high-traffic Hillcrest area. So, there are significant construction/cost/expansion concerns.

This study was the first step in the process of constructing such a project. An initial timeline offered in the study for the project's completion was 5 years. Since October 2012, no further action has been taken.
