= National City station =

National City
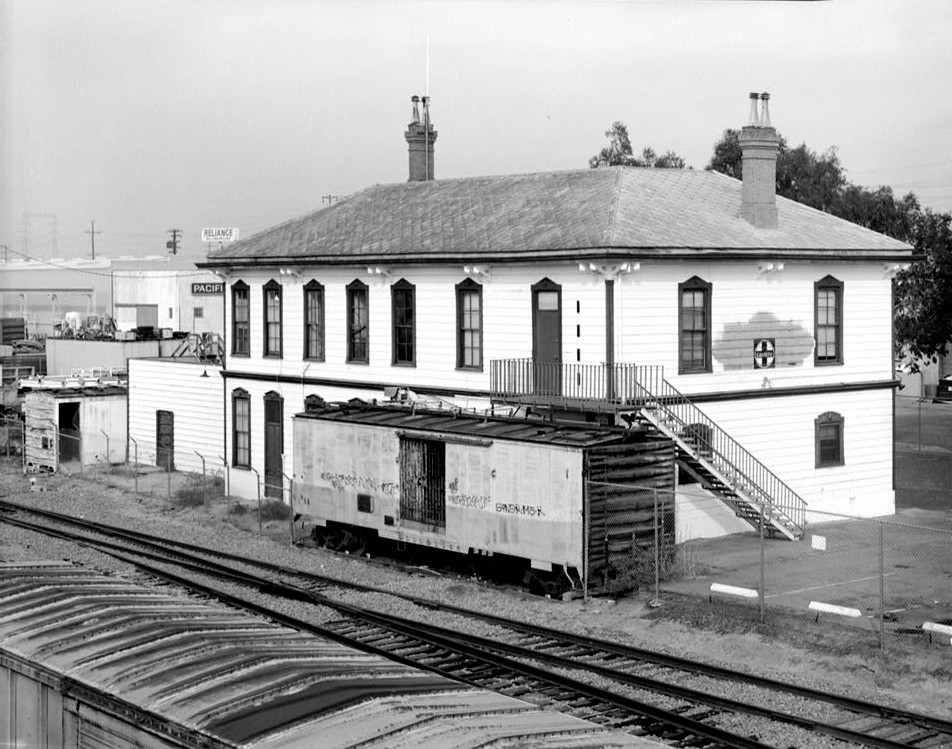
- Historic American Buildings Survey photograph of the station, 1996

General information
- Location: 900 West 23rd Street; National City, California

History
- Opened: 1882
- Closed: 1930 (passengers)

Former services
Preceding station	Atchison, Topeka and Santa Fe Railway	Following station
San Diego 22nd Street toward La Grande Station	Surf Line	Terminus
- Station and General Office, California Southern Railroad
- U.S. National Register of Historic Places
- California Historical Landmark
- Coordinates: 32.660194°N 117.111511°W
- Area: 1.3 acres (0.53 ha)
- Built: 1882
- Built by: California Southern Railroad
- Architectural style: Italianate
- NRHP reference No.: 96000424
- CHISL No.: 1023
- Added to NRHP: April 18, 1996
Location

National City station is a former railway station in National City, California. The California Southern Railroad, a subsidiary of the Atchison, Topeka and Santa Fe Railway, chose National City as the West Coast base of operations at the terminus of their planned transcontinental railroad.

== History ==
The station building was built in 1882, following construction of a rail yard the previous year. On November 14, 1885, the first transcontinental passenger train departed National City en route to the east coast. In 1889, Santa Fe moved their workshops and offices to San Bernardino and Los Angeles and operations significantly declined at National City. Passenger trains lasted until 1930 and the station served as a freight depot until the 1960s. It was subsequently used as a restaurant and office spaces. The building was restored to its original condition in 1997 by the San Diego Electric Railway Association, who opened it as a museum.

The station was listed on the National Register of Historic Places on April 18, 1996, as the Station and General Office, California Southern Railroad. It is also listed as a California Historical Landmark under the name National City Santa Fe Rail Depot.
