= Convention Center station (San Diego Trolley) =

Trolley station in San Diego, California

Convention Center
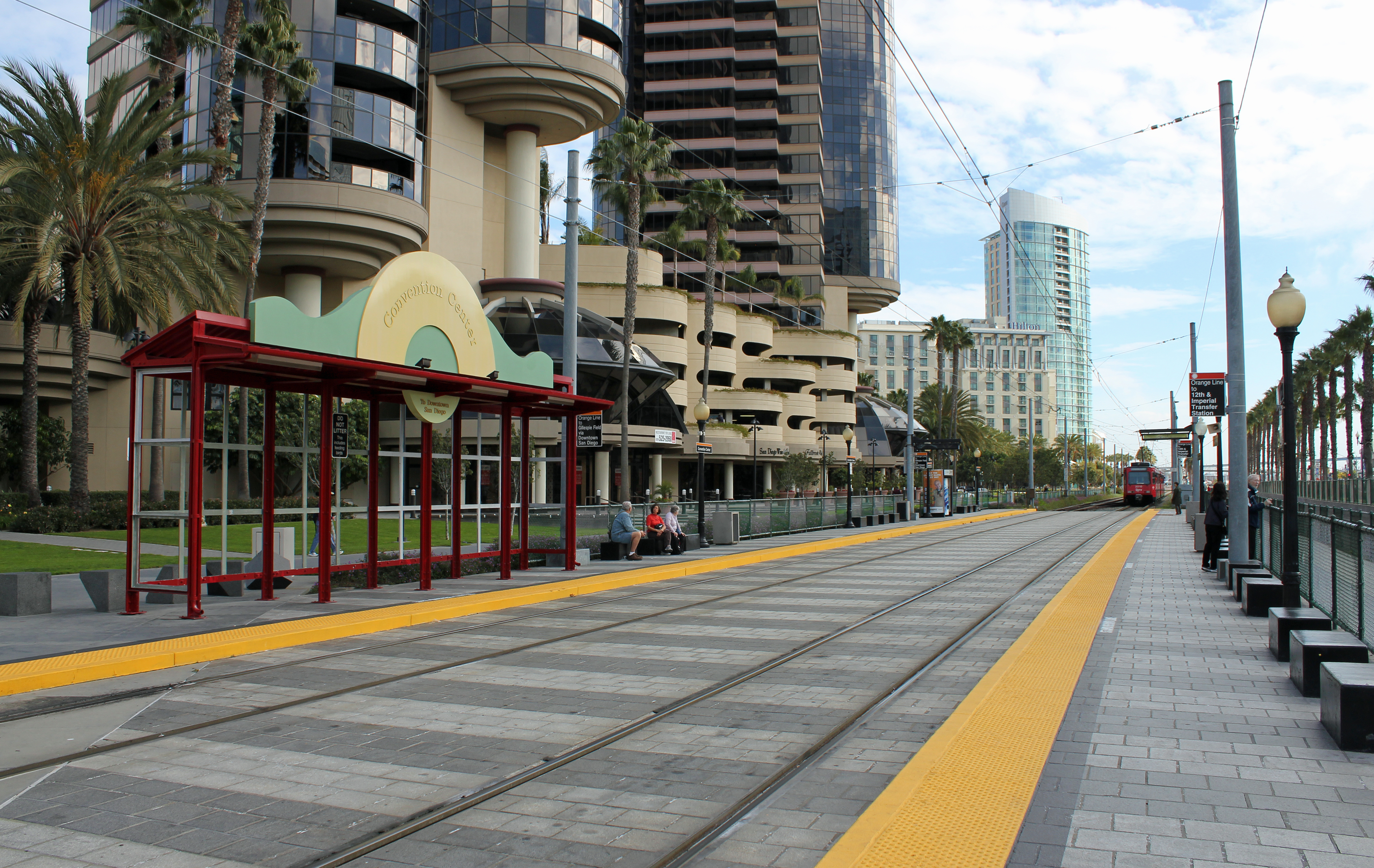
- The station in 2011, when it was served by the Orange Line

General information
- Location: 301 First Avenue; San Diego, California; United States
- Coordinates: 32°42′33″N 117°09′51″W
- Owner: San Diego Metropolitan Transit System
- Operator: San Diego Trolley
- Line: Bayside Corridor
- Platforms: 2 side platforms
- Tracks: 3

Construction
- Structure type: At-grade
- Accessible: Disabled access

Other information
- Station code: 75096, 75097

History
- Opened: May 3, 1990 (weekend service only); June 30, 1990 (full opening)
- Rebuilt: 2012

Services
Preceding station	San Diego Trolley	Following station
Gaslamp Quarter toward 12th & Imperial	Green Line	Seaport Village toward El Cajon
Gaslamp Quarter toward 12th & Imperial	Special Event Line	Seaport Village toward Balboa Avenue
Gaslamp Quarter One-way operation	Silver Line	Seaport Village Next clockwise
Former services
Preceding station	San Diego Trolley	Following station
Gaslamp Quarter toward 12th & Imperial	Orange Line 2005-2012	Seaport Village toward Gillespie Field
Gaslamp Quarter toward 12th & Imperial	Special Event Line pre-2012	Seaport Village toward Qualcomm Stadium
Location

Convention Center station is a station of the Green and Silver Lines on the San Diego Trolley. It is located near the intersection of Harbor Drive and First Avenue in the Marina district section of the city, which features a variety of waterfront apartments just west of downtown. The San Diego Convention Center is located adjacent to the station, and Petco Park is less than half a mile away. This station was partly opened on May 3, 1990, for a weekend-only service from the Convention Center to 12th & Imperial. It was then fully opened on June 30, 1990 as part of the Orange Line's (then called the East Line) Bayside Extension.

It was closed from April 9 through July 2012 to undergo renovations as part of the Trolley Renewal Project.

On September 2, 2012, service to this station by the Orange Line was replaced by the Green Line as part of a system redesign.

== Station layout ==
There are two tracks, each with a side platform. A third track handles freight operations, and Coaster trains heading to and from the yard.

== See also ==
- List of San Diego Trolley stations
