= California International Business University =

Former private university in San Diego, California, US

Coordinates: 32.718°N 117.168°W

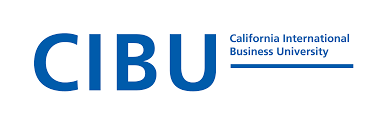
- Type: Private
- Active: 1995–2020
- Location: San Diego, California, United States
- Website: www.cibu.edu

California International Business University (CIBU) was a private university in San Diego, California. The university was located in the Little Italy section of downtown San Diego. The university offered a Doctor of Business Administration (DBA), a Master of Business Administration (MBA), a Master of Science in International Management (MSIM), and upper division classes leading to a Bachelor of Science in Management (BS) as well as a Bachelor of Science in Management & Psychology (BS).

The university's courses were formulated based on the practical American business approach and the European methodology of collaborative learning, with curriculum focused on promoting critical thinking skills by blending hands-on experiences with in-class instruction. The university's graduate curriculum emphasized organisational behavior, organisational psychology, inter-cultural negotiations and leadership skills, and training in managerial finance. The university attracted students from more than 80 countries and organized many study field trips to both local and state businesses, including visits to the Silicon Valley, to complement in-class instruction.

In May 2020, the university closed amid the COVID-19 pandemic.

== History ==
California International Business University (CIBU) was founded in 1995 as International School of Management (ISM), a California Nonprofit corporation. In 2002, to reduce confusion with similarly-named institutions, ISM changed its name to The California School of International Management (CSIM). In 2008, due to accreditation and addition of the doctorate program, CSIM was changed to California International Business University. The California International Business University was accredited by ACICS, a national accreditor recognized by the US Department of Education.
