= Embarcadero =

Embarcadero, the Spanish word for wharf, may also refer specifically to:

== Places ==
- Embarcadero (San Diego), California
  - Embarcadero Circle, waterfront re-development project in San Diego
- Embarcadero (San Francisco), a location on the eastern waterfront of San Francisco
  - Embarcadero Center, office complex in San Francisco
  - Embarcadero Freeway, former California State Route 480
  - Embarcadero Station, an intermodal station serving mostly Muni services and BART

== Transportation ==
- E Embarcadero, a suspended streetcar line in San Francisco

== Brands and enterprises ==
- Embarcadero Technologies, developer tools and data management company
