= Embarcadero (San Diego) =

Coordinates: 32°42′54″N 117°10′31″W

The Embarcadero in San Diego, California, is the area along the San Diego harbor on the east side of San Diego Bay. "Embarcadero" is a Spanish word meaning "boarding place". The Embarcadero sits on property administered by the Port of San Diego, in the Columbia district of downtown San Diego.

The Embarcadero is home to the San Diego cruise ship terminal, the museum ships USS Midway and Star of India, seven other historic vessels belonging to the Maritime Museum of San Diego, and various restaurants and shops from the North Embarcadero down through Seaport Village. In 2010, the Port completed a redevelopment of the historic Broadway Pier to create the Port Pavilion, a second cruise-ship pier and terminal.

== North Embarcadero Visionary Plan ==
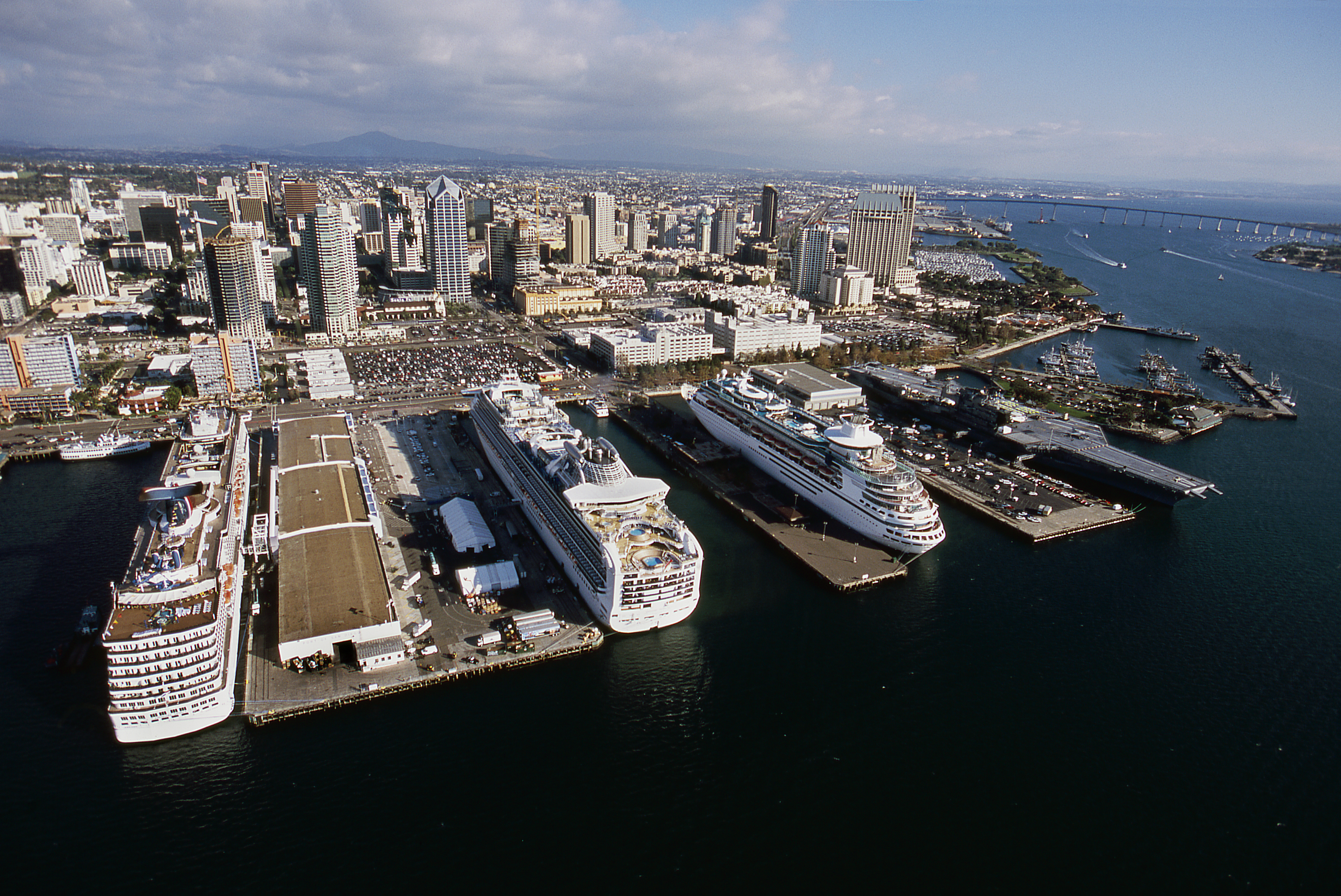
North Embarcadero in 2006

In 1997, a major redevelopment of the Embarcadero was proposed, to be carried out through a Joint Powers Authority (JPA), composed of the City of San Diego, the Centre City Development Corporation (CCDC), and the Port of San Diego. The proposed redevelopment was called the North Embarcadero Visionary Plan, a multi-phased redevelopment of the waterfront in downtown San Diego. This redevelopment project proposed to move Harbor Drive 40 feet (12 m) to the east and build an esplanade from the B Street Pier to the former Navy Pier along Harbor Drive. It also included public art displays, tree groves and open spaces, while continuing San Diego's tradition of having a working waterfront, according to Port plans. The proposed redevelopment area was bordered by Market Street to the south (Marina district), Laurel Street to the north (Little Italy), and the railroad tracks to the east.

However, the proposed redevelopment project was sent back to the drawing boards in April 2010 when the California Coastal Commission rejected it. A major issue was the disappearance from the plan of an originally proposed 79,000-square-foot (7,300 m^{2}) grassy park. In the plan rejected by the Coastal Commission, the park had been replaced by a smaller, hardscape plaza. The Port amended its plans and the first phase of the plan was completed in November 2014.

== Central Embarcadero Redevelopment ==
The Port of San Diego is currently pursuing potential redevelopment of the Central Embarcadero. The site in consideration is approximately 70 acres of land and water that includes Seaport Village, Santa Monica Seafood (formerly Chesapeake Fish), and surrounding areas between the Manchester Grand Hyatt and the USS Midway Museum. Embarcadero Marina Park North, Ruocco Park, and Tuna Harbor are also included. The Headquarters and The Fish Market Restaurant are within the boundary but excluded from the proposed redevelopment project.

A mixed-use development is proposed that includes public realm space with parks, open spaces and plazas, piers, walkways, beaches, nature trails, shared streets, and public rooftop; hotels; an event center; an aquarium, office space, commercial fishing facilities; and retail/restaurants. The landmark structure would be a 500-foot observation tower designed by Bjarke Ingels Group. An environmental review process began in November 2022.
