= Columbia, San Diego =

- Neighborhood of San Diego
- Columbia
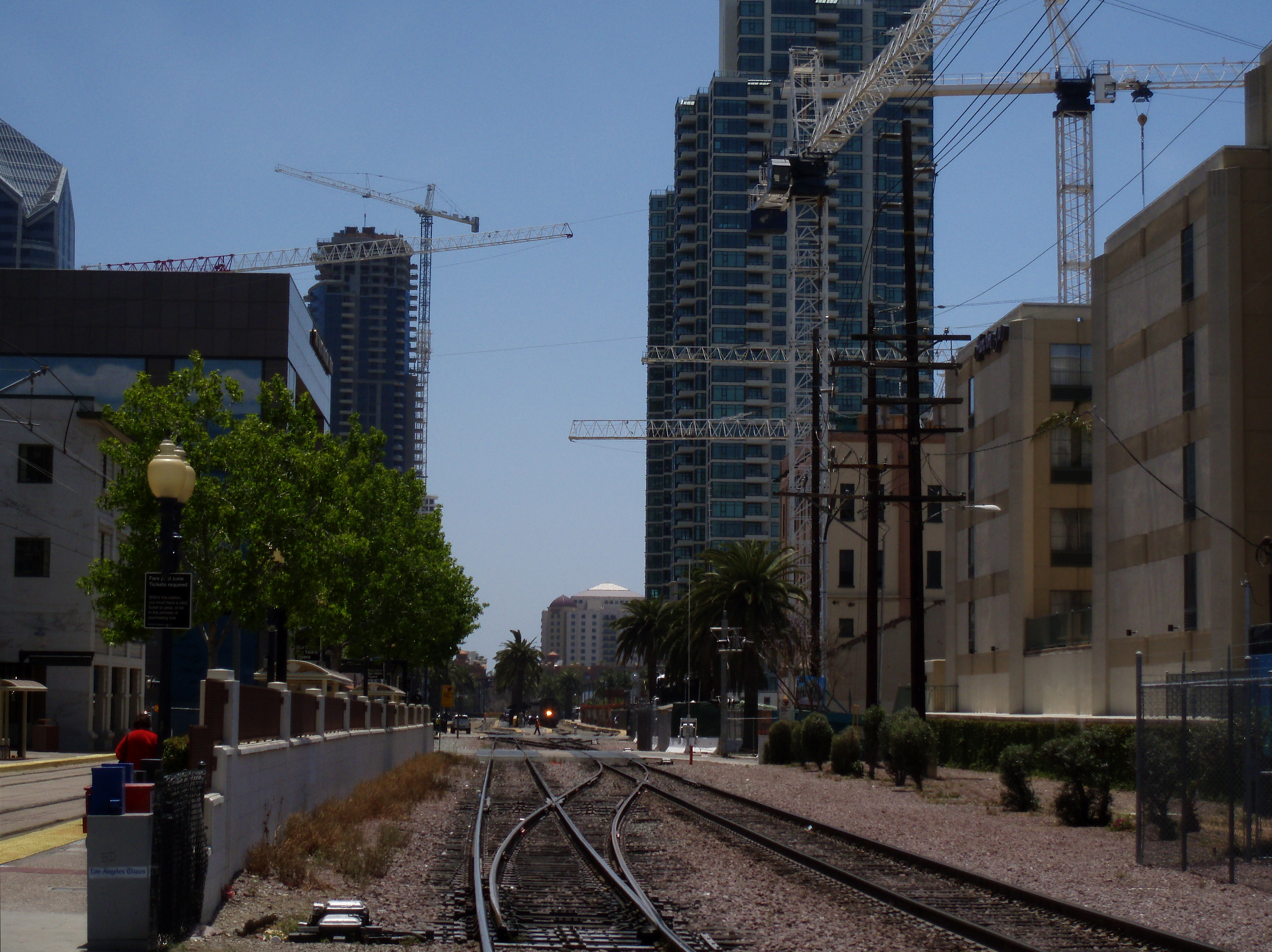
- The Columbia district undergoing redevelopment.

- Location within Central San Diego Columbia, San Diego (California) Columbia, San Diego (the United States)
- Coordinates: 32°43′0.04″N 117°10′5.68″W
- Country: United States of America
- State: California
- County: San Diego
- City: San Diego

Area
  - Total: 0.429 sq mi (1.11 km^{2})
  - Land: 0.429 sq mi (1.11 km^{2})

Population (2008)
  - Total: 3,772
  - Density: 8,802/sq mi (3,398/km^{2})
- Population data for Core-Columbia
- ZIP Code: 92101
- Area code: 619

Columbia is a neighborhood in downtown San Diego, California. It is largely commercial, however there are many high-rise condominium buildings under construction.

The USS Midway Museum and the Maritime Museum of San Diego are located in this neighborhood.

== Geography ==
Columbia is located south of Little Italy, north of the Marina district, and west of the Core. This district is bordered by Ash Street to the north, F Street to the south, Union Street to the east and the Pacific Ocean to the west.

Santa Fe Depot is served by the Trolley, the COASTER and the Pacific Surfliner.

== Redevelopment ==
Parts of Columbia are under re-development, including the North Embarcadero Visionary Plan, Navy Broadway Complex and the Embarcadero Circle cruise ship terminal expansion. As of March 16, 2007, there are seven high-rise buildings scheduled for or currently under construction: five of these buildings are condominiums, one is office, and one is a Federal court house; six buildings have more than 20 floors, four buildings have more than 30 floors, and one building has more than 40 floors.
