= Marina district =

Marina district may refer to one of these places:

- Marina District, San Francisco
- Marina, San Diego
- Marina Bay, Singapore
