= Midtown, San Diego =

Coordinates: 32°44′19″N 117°10′31″W

Middletown is a neighborhood in San Diego, California, United States. It is bordered by Mission Hills to the north, the Midway area to the west, Hillcrest and Bankers Hill to the east, and downtown to the south.
