= Cortez Hill, San Diego =

Neighborhood in San Diego, California

Coordinates: 32°43′18″N 117°9′36″W

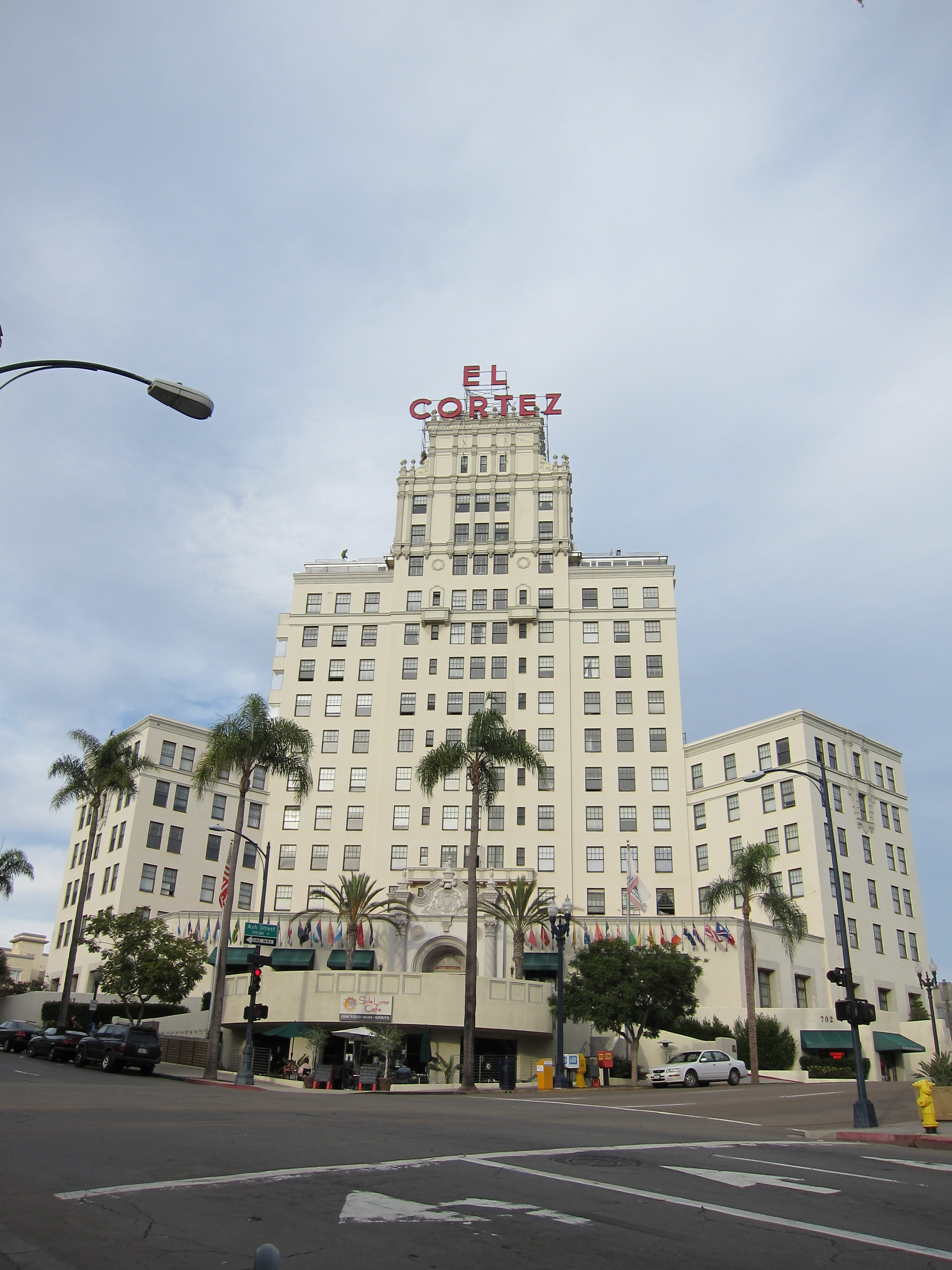
El Cortez at the corner of Ash Street and Seventh Street

Cortez Hill is a neighborhood in the northeast part of downtown San Diego, California.

== Geography ==
Cortez Hill is located south of Bankers Hill, north of the Core district, east of Little Italy and west of Balboa Park. This district is bordered by Interstate 5 to the north, Ash Street/A Street to the south, 11th Avenue/SR 163 to the east and Front Street to the west. The neighborhood consists of 111 acres and 30 city blocks.

The hill proper rises east of Sixth Avenue. The flatter area west of Sixth Avenue is known as Cortez West.

== History ==
Named after the historic El Cortez Hotel, this district is one of San Diego's oldest residential neighborhoods.

St. Joseph's Church (now St. Joseph Cathedral), was constructed at Third Ave. and Beech St. in 1875. When the Roman Catholic Diocese of San Diego was established in 1936, the church became a cathedral and the seat of the Diocese. It has been reconstructed and expanded several times but remains at its original location.

The El Cortez Hotel was built from 1926 to 1927 and opened on November 26, 1927. It was the tallest building in the city until Executive Complex was completed in 1963.

Since 1973 the California Western School of Law campus has been located in Cortez Hill.

In 1992, the Redevelopment Agency envisioned reviving this district by further developing the hill for residential use, and encouraging a mix of residential and commercial infill. Schools, churches and a pedestrian-friendly environment now characterize the western portion of Cortez Hill. Commercial shops and sidewalk cafes line Fifth and Sixth Avenues, and Ash Street provides a gateway to the waterfront. As the highest land mass in the Centre City Community Planning area, Cortez Hill boasts views of urban San Diego, Balboa Park, the bay and Pacific Ocean. New developments include 6,000 square feet (600 m^{2}) of retail space, 758 residential units and the Cortez Hill Neighborhood Park/Tweet Street. Also in place is a plan to reduce non-resident parking.
