= 101 Ash Street =

Office building in San Diego, California

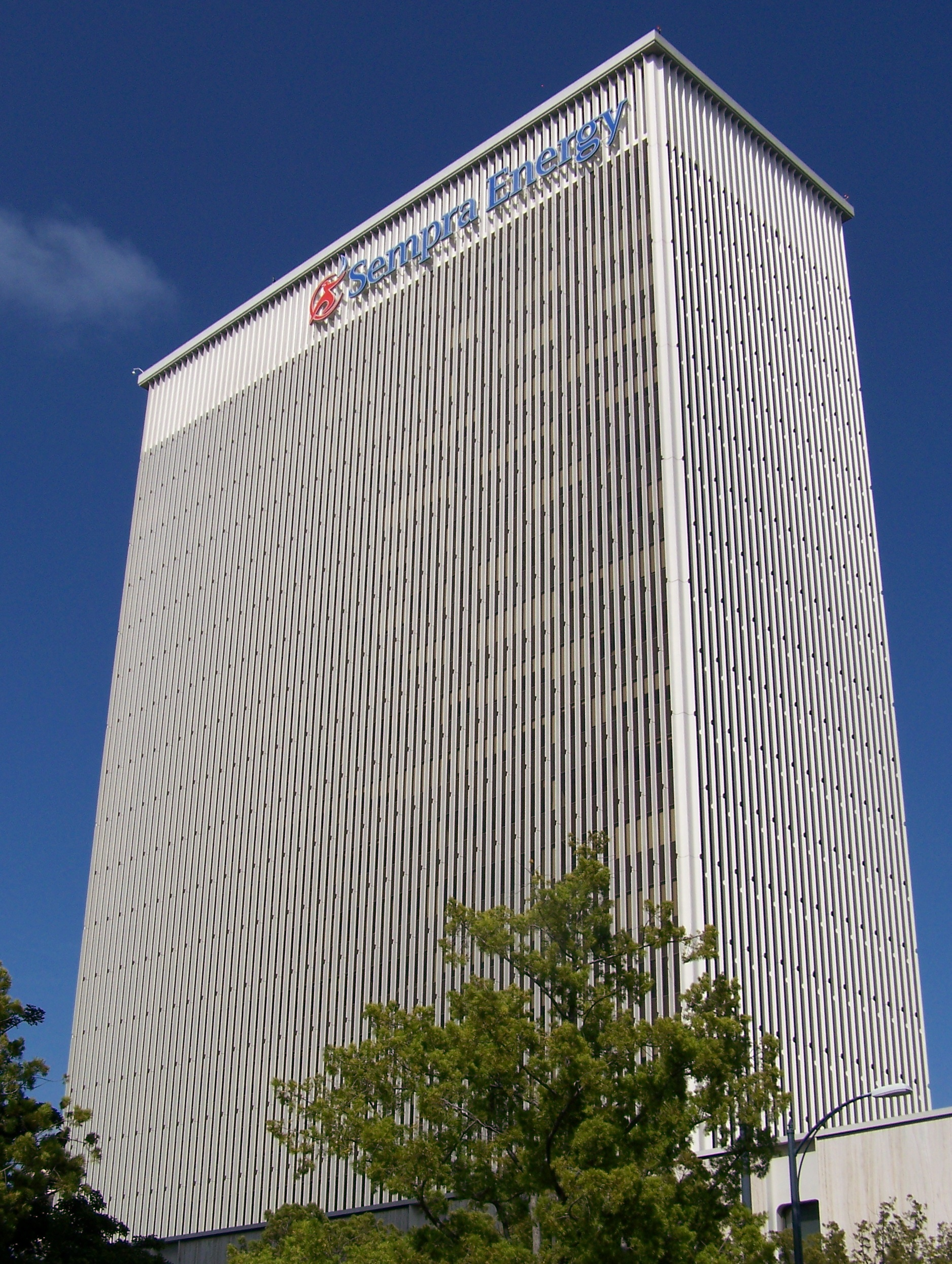
- Building in 2009 with Sempra Energy logo on its facade, now removed.
- Interactive map of the 101 Ash Street area
- Alternative names: Sempra Building (former)

General information
- Type: Commercial offices
- Location: 101 Ash Street; San Diego, California
- Coordinates: 32.719410°N 117.163390°W
- Completed: 1967
- Owner: City of San Diego

Height
- Roof: 288 ft (88 m)

Technical details
- Floor count: 21
- Floor area: 447,732 sq ft (41,595.7 m^{2})

101 Ash Street is an unoccupied office building in the downtown core of San Diego, California. The steel and concrete structure was built in 1967 on a rectangular 180 ft (55 m) x 70 ft (21 m) footprint. The building is 21 stories with two additional underground levels for a basement-to-roof height of 315 ft (96 m) and a square footage of 447,732 sq ft (41,595.7 m^{2}), including the 240-car garage.

== History ==
The building was occupied by San Diego Gas & Electric (SDGE) from 1968 to 1998, and then by SDGE parent Sempra Energy from 1998 to 2015.

In 2016, Mayor Kevin Faulconer announced a $128 million lease-to-own deal under which the city would acquire the building as-is from owner Cisterra Development and at the end of the 20-year lease own the building free-and-clear. After the deal closed in January 2017, asbestos was discovered, complicating needed renovation work and delaying the move of workers into the building. In August 2018, the San Diego City Council approved a Faulconer administration plan to invest an additional $30 million into the site for renovations. Hundreds of city workers were moved into the building in December 2019; however, by January 2020, the mayor announced an evacuation of the building for safety reasons following asbestos violations discovered by county regulators.

In September 2020, the city suspended monthly lease payments due to a lawsuit brought by a resident seeking to nullify the original contract and recover taxpayer losses. In July 2022, the City Council approved a settlement with Cisterra Development, agreeing to pay the developer $86 million for the property while receiving back a refund of $7.5 million from the original lease-to-own payments. San Diego City Attorney Mara Elliott, who approved the initial deal, had urged the council to reject the proposal. The city recouped an additional $9.4 million in March 2023 after suing Jason Hughes, the real estate broker on the original deal. Hughes also pled guilty to a misdemeanor criminal charge of conflict-of-interest.

In August 2023, La Jolla developer Reven Capital proposed converting the building into affordable housing as a part of the city's request for proposals on future development for the site and surrounding publicly owned land.

== See also ==
- Downtown San Diego
