= C Street Inn =

Hotel in San Diego, California

- The building in the 1930s
- Former names: Hotel Polhemus (1913–31); Cecil Hotel (1931–90s)

General information
- Status: Completed
- Type: Apartment hotel (SRO)
- Architectural style: Edwardian Commercial
- Location: Core, 630–636 C St, San Diego, California, 92101, United States
- Coordinates: 32°43′01.1″N 117°09′31.6″W
- Completed: 1913
- Cost: $75,000
- Owner: Jax Properties LLC
- Landlord: Jack Shah Rafiq

Height
- Top floor: 6

Technical details
- Structural system: Concrete and brick
- Floor count: 6 above ground; 1 basement level

Design and construction
- Architect: Arthur J. Hamilton
- Developer: Chaffey Concrete Construction Company
- Other designers: Hamilton & Smith Brothers
- Known for: Class A; fireproof

Other information
- Number of rooms: 110

The C Street Inn, formerly known as the Hotel Polhemus and Cecil Hotel, is an affordable housing complex in downtown San Diego's Core district that was vacated in 2022 due to poor living conditions. It was erected in 1913 with a capacity of 110 rooms.

Starting in the 2010s, a basement space was utilized as a studio for stage performances and film productions. In 2022, the building was vacated for its unfavorable living environment and the city began the process of relocating all of the hotel's residents.

Throughout the hotel's history, several minor fires have caused damage, triggering temporary evacuations. The building has also been the location of several criminal incidents.

== History ==
The building's architect, Arthur J. Hamilton, had also designed the nearby Robert E. Lee Hotel. The concrete building was erected in 1913 at a cost of $75,000, equivalent to $2,502,155 in 2025. Hamilton & Smith Brothers designed the building, planning for the first floor to be occupied by stores. Chaffey Concrete Construction Company was assigned to construct the building located at 630–636 C Street in Core, San Diego.

A 2003 assessment of the building was conducted by the Office of Marie Burke Lia. They concluded the building is a six-story reinforced-concrete structure in the "Edwardian Commercial" style, that featured groups of recessed casement windows with transoms. The ground floor originally contained storefronts and a hotel entrance, with a full basement below. The main floor and storefronts have been modified over time, while light wells were added before 1930.

=== 1913–1930: Hotel Polhemus ===
Artwork of the building in 1914

Willis P. Polhemus owned the new building and the land it occupied in 1913. Florence C. Thorbus ran the La Mesa School of Expression for Motion Pictures out of the hotel.

In January 1920, the Industrial Welfare Commission held a meeting at the hotel, focusing on minimum wages for employed women in San Diego. That same month, librarian Mary Elizabeth Downey stayed at the Polhemus while in town to speak at the San Diego Public Library. A. P. Wilkinson sold the hotel to George A. Brown and J. H. Sprague in 1921. Hotel del Coronado room clerk Edgar P. Schiller was hired as manager in 1929 after the Polhemus was leased to George W. Wood.

=== 1931–1990: Cecil Hotel ===
Located at C Street and Seventh, the building was known as the Hotel Cecil in 1931, and advertised by Imperial Valley Press as fireproof with 100 rooms. Polhemus sold the property to an undisclosed buyer in 1934 for $75,000, equivalent to $1,805,037 in 2025.

A fire started on the third floor in 1990, and 25 tenants were evacuated. About 30 firefighters responded to the noontime incident, and residents were allowed back inside within 40 minutes. The blaze was caused by a new tenant whose lit cigarette ignited his mattress, and resulted in $2,500 in property damage, equivalent to $6,161 in 2025.

=== 1998–2022: C Street Inn ===
Known then as the C Street Inn, the building was damaged by a fire in 1998 and 40 people were evacuated due to a cigarette igniting a mattress on the fourth floor. The following year, another fire broke out causing evacuation of the building. Police safely helped a man who jumped out of his hotel window to avoid smoke inhalation.

San Diego County was one of the top three counties in the state for hotels facing a default in 2009 and the C Street Inn was one of them. A body was found in one of the hotel rooms by a maintenance worker in 2014 after a guest complained of an odor. The police said it was not a suspicious death.

==== Vacation of property ====
Residents of the hotel were forced to vacate the building in July 2022 due to fire hazards, unpleasant living conditions, and infestations of mold and rodents. The city of San Diego and attorney Mara Elliott later claimed that the owner Jack Shah Rafiq and his company Jax Properties LLC would be held responsible for covering the occupants' collective relocation costs of $339,840, equivalent to $373,886 in 2025. Rafiq appealed the decision and claimed the city was motivated by a desire to pressure low-income residents to leave the area.

Local police and fire marshals unsuccessfully attempted to evacuate the building in April 2022 following the discovery of "multiple health and safety violations", leaving the premises after meeting with Rafiq. Tenants of the hotel were given a 10-day eviction notice that was not followed up on. Elliott announced in July that the building was a public nuisance and that residents would be relocated. Spanish-American poet Neil Rico, a resident of the hotel at the time, claimed the situation was unfair to tenants who relied on the low-cost accommodation because of their fixed and limited incomes. In August, a local Superior Court judge appointed a receiver to take control of the property.

== Basement ==
The basement of the C Street Inn has multiple entryways, from the main lobby of the hotel and from a separate business entrance on Seventh Ave. Much of the hotel's basement is directly below multiple other businesses that are not part of the property. Rafiq often rented out rooms in the basement to tenants, who were not eligible for relocation claims once the building was subsequently vacated.

=== In popular culture ===
A space in the basement was occupied by Gray Area Multimedia in 2020, a studio location formerly known during the mid-2010s as Rosewood Five Studios at 1150 Seventh Ave. It housed staged performances of Twelve Nights with Viola & Olivia (an adaptation of the similarly titled play by William Shakespeare), Dr. Svetlana's Public & Private Health Lecture Demonstration, and Belief No Repeat for the San Diego International Fringe Festival. Gray Area Multimedia was also filming location for multiple independent films including Friend of the World (2020) by Brian Patrick Butler, Hacksaw (2020) by Anthony Leone, and Touch (2022) by Justin Burquist.

== Criminal incidents ==
The city alleges that excessive criminal activity was reported in the building in 2022. Police had responded to emergency calls from the hotel over 190 times over a three-year period since May 2019, spending a total of 465 hours to address burglaries, public intoxication charges, and other nuisances.

=== 1916–1958: Theft and attempted robberies ===
Los Angeles resident William Haupt was arrested in April 1916 outside the building by police officer Tim Holcomb after kicking several trash cans. Later that year, a man was arrested for attempting to steal a tire from the building clerk's automobile. In 1918, fifteen-year-old William Dowlar, a bellboy at the hotel, was arrested for stealing a $150 diamond ring, a Kodak camera, and a fountain pen from a hotel guest.

29-year-old Franklin McGuire was arrested in 1921 for burglary shortly after stealing $125 worth of clothes from a room in the building. The following year, two armed men were arrested in downtown San Diego after briefly being pursued by police. They were wanted for holding up the building's hotel clerk R. W. Smith. A struggle broke out during the attempted robbery, and a gun was discharged, but no one was hurt. The thieves had previously made off with a suitcase with $150 worth of clothes from the nearby Panama Hotel, and they were already wanted by police in Long Beach, California, after robbing an apartment clerk of $45 and stealing a car in Sacramento. They were held in the local jail on a bail of $1,000 each and were suspected to have committed other recent thefts.

Four inmates awaiting trial on robbery charges in Oklahoma were staying in the building in November 1924. Detectives were alerted and questioned them in their room, but the men were able to mislead law enforcement by claiming that they were ranch owners traveling across the country. On January 16, 1925, they stole more than $3,000 from the nearby San Diego Pantages Theatre, equivalent to $55,076 in 2025. Night clerk P. W. Price was robbed at gunpoint on the second floor of the building in 1931. The next year, on-duty night clerks at the Cecil Hotel and the nearby Churchill Hotel were robbed within an hour of each other. Clerk Charles Sutter was robbed of $150 in 1958 by the "Elevator Bandit" who forced him into the building's elevator and escaped while the elevator ascended.

=== 1978–1999: Raid, assault, escapee arrest, and fatal fall ===
The building was one of ten hotels in the downtown area raided by the San Diego Police Department in September 1978. Policewomen went undercover as prostitutes, rented rooms, and made 15 arrests. Later that same month, Moses Franklin was arrested for assault in a room he shared with a teenage runaway from Tucson, Arizona. William Dean Short, a prison escapee from Muskogee, Oklahoma, was caught and arrested in the building in 1992. In 1999, Lt. Ray Sigwalt said that the San Diego Police Department's homicide unit was called after a 66-year-old man died from a sixth-floor fall into the building's air shaft.
