= The Rady Shell at Jacobs Park =

Music venue in San Diego, California

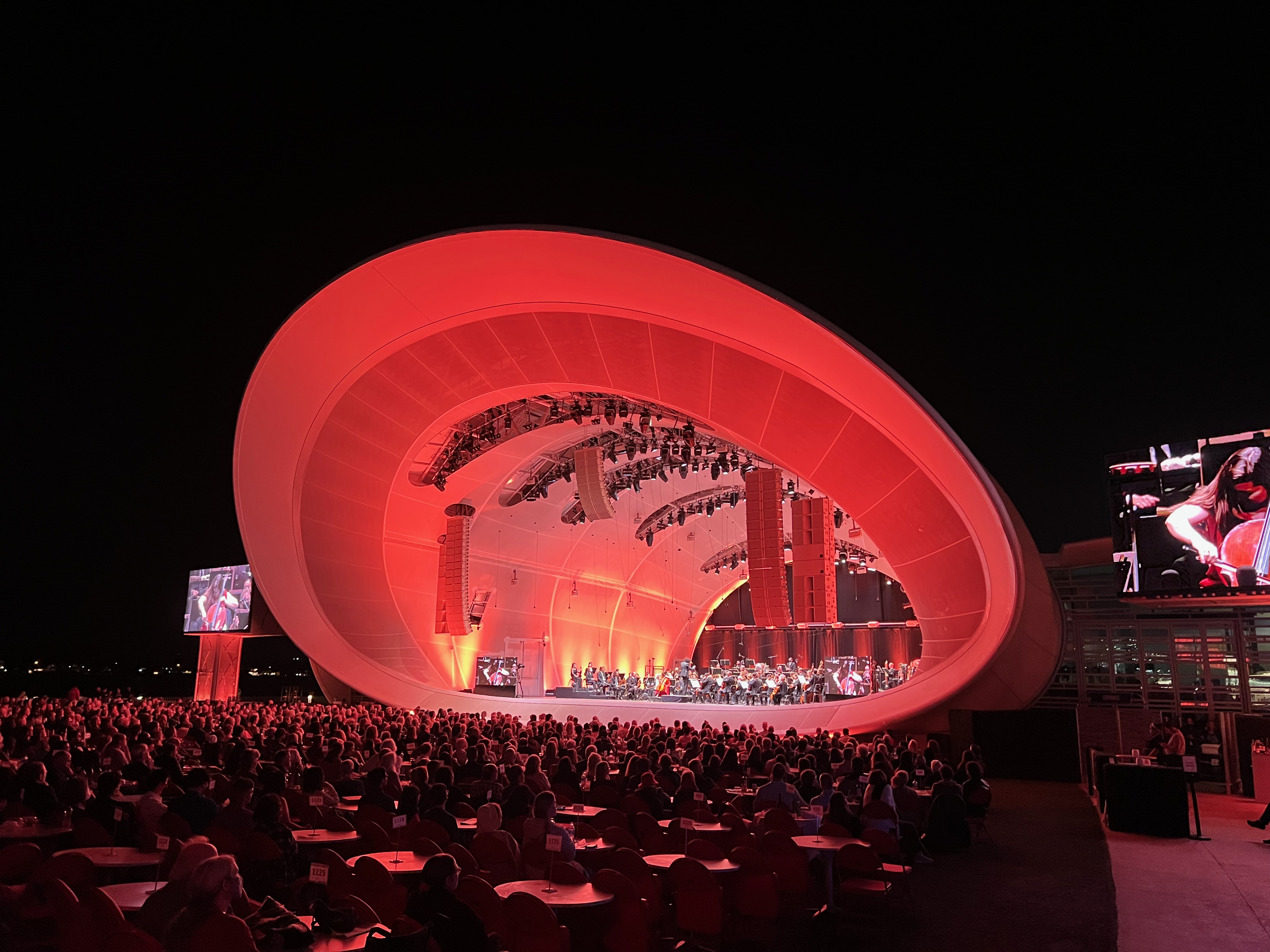
- San Diego Symphony performing at the Rady Shell in 2022

- Location within San Diego Location within California Location within the United States
- Address: 222 Marina Park Way; San Diego, California; US
- Location: Embarcadero Marina Park South
- Coordinates: 32.70493072363166°N 117.16575802946254°W
- Operator: San Diego Symphony
- Capacity: 8,500
- Type: Outdoor concert shell
- Public transit: San Diego Trolley Green Line at Convention Center

Construction
- Groundbreaking: August 29, 2019
- Opened: August 5, 2021
- Architect: Tucker Sadler Architects
- Structural engineer: Coffman Engineers
- General contractor: Rudolph and Sletten

Website
- www.theshell.org

The Rady Shell at Jacobs Park is an open-air music venue in San Diego, California. It first opened in 2021, and is operated by the San Diego Symphony on the grounds of Embarcadero Marina Park South, which the symphony leases from the Port of San Diego. The site is located on San Diego Bay in the Marina district of downtown San Diego.

== Design and construction ==
Prior to construction of the Rady Shell, the San Diego Symphony had held summertime concerts at the same location for 15 years using temporary structures. The new permanent venue, initially called the Bayside Performance Park, broke ground on August 29, 2019, and was designed by Tucker Sadler Architects. The central Performance Shell was designed by the London company Soundforms. Rudolph and Sletten was the general contractor and Coffman Engineers provided the structural engineering.

The symphony originally planned to invest $45 million in construction of the venue and associated improvements to the park, such as new lighting and public restrooms. The new facilities were planned to open in July 2020, but the COVID-19 pandemic delayed the opening for 13 months. The symphony decided to use the extra time to add features to the project, resulting in a final budget of $85 million. More than 99% of the funds were raised from private donations.

In May 2021, the symphony announced that the venue would be named "The Rady Shell at Jacobs Park" in honor of some of its major donors: Ernest and Evelyn Rady gave $15 million for the project, and Joan and Irwin Jacobs donated $11 million. Other major donors included the Conrad Prebys Foundation ($12 million) and Una Davis ($10 million). The facility was officially opened with a ribbon-cutting ceremony on August 5, 2021. A six-course dinner and a fireworks display accompanied the following evening's opening San Diego Symphony performance of music by Mozart, Gershwin, Saint-Saëns, and Stravinsky.

== Facilities ==
A 3,865 square foot (359.1 m^{2}) covered stage supports both symphonies and pop music performances. A sloping lawn covered with artificial turf provides variable amounts of seating for 2,000 to 8,500 guests. Only temporary seating is used so that the lawn can be open for public use on non-concert days. A typical performance in 2021 was configured for 3,500 seats; this was expanded to over 4,700 seats for 2022. The number of performances is limited to ensure public access to the park, and no more than six events per year can use the maximum seating capacity.

== Performances ==
Artists who have performed at the Rady Shell include Sting, Boyz II Men, Leon Bridges, Stewart Copeland, Sheryl Crow, Norah Jones, Gladys Knight, Ledisi, Smokey Robinson, Olivia Rodrigo, Ben Platt, Charlie Puth, Lea Salonga, King Gizzard & the Lizard Wizard, Brian Wilson,Chris Tomlin and Haim.
