= Marina, San Diego =

- Neighborhood of San Diego
- Marina
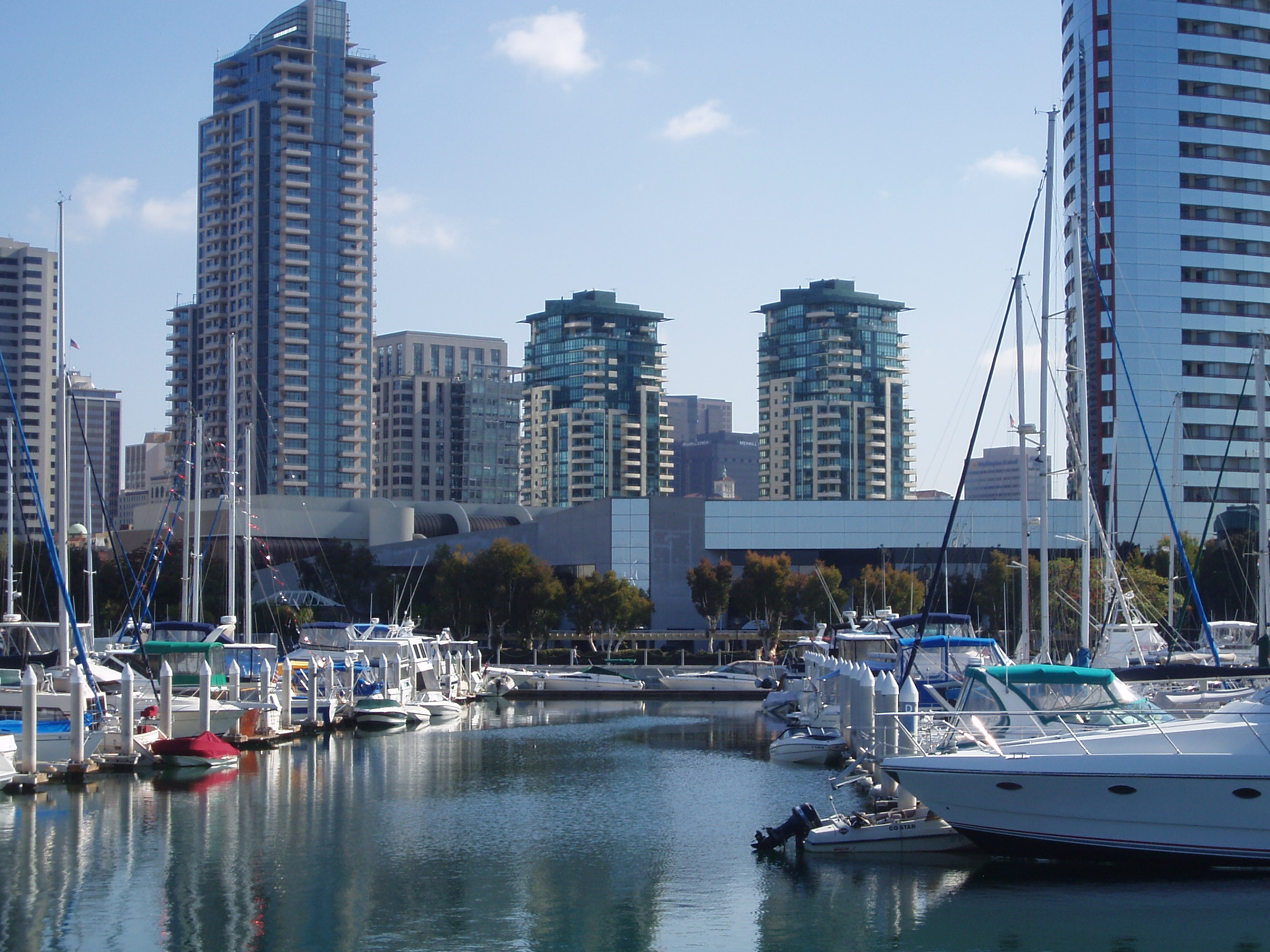
- Southeastern part of Marina viewed from Marina Park.

- Location within Central San Diego Marina, San Diego (California) Marina, San Diego (the United States)
- Coordinates: 32°42′42″N 117°10′9″W
- Country: United States of America
- State: California
- County: San Diego
- City: San Diego

Area
  - Total: 0.536 sq mi (1.39 km^{2})
  - Land: 0.536 sq mi (1.39 km^{2})

Population (2008)
  - Total: 3,894
  - Density: 7,261/sq mi (2,803/km^{2})
- ZIP Code: 92101
- Area code: 619

Marina is a neighborhood in the southwest section of downtown San Diego, California, along San Diego Bay. It comprises a district of retail and entertainment complexes, such as the Rady Shell at Jacobs Park, Seaport Village, and the San Diego Convention Center.

== Geography ==
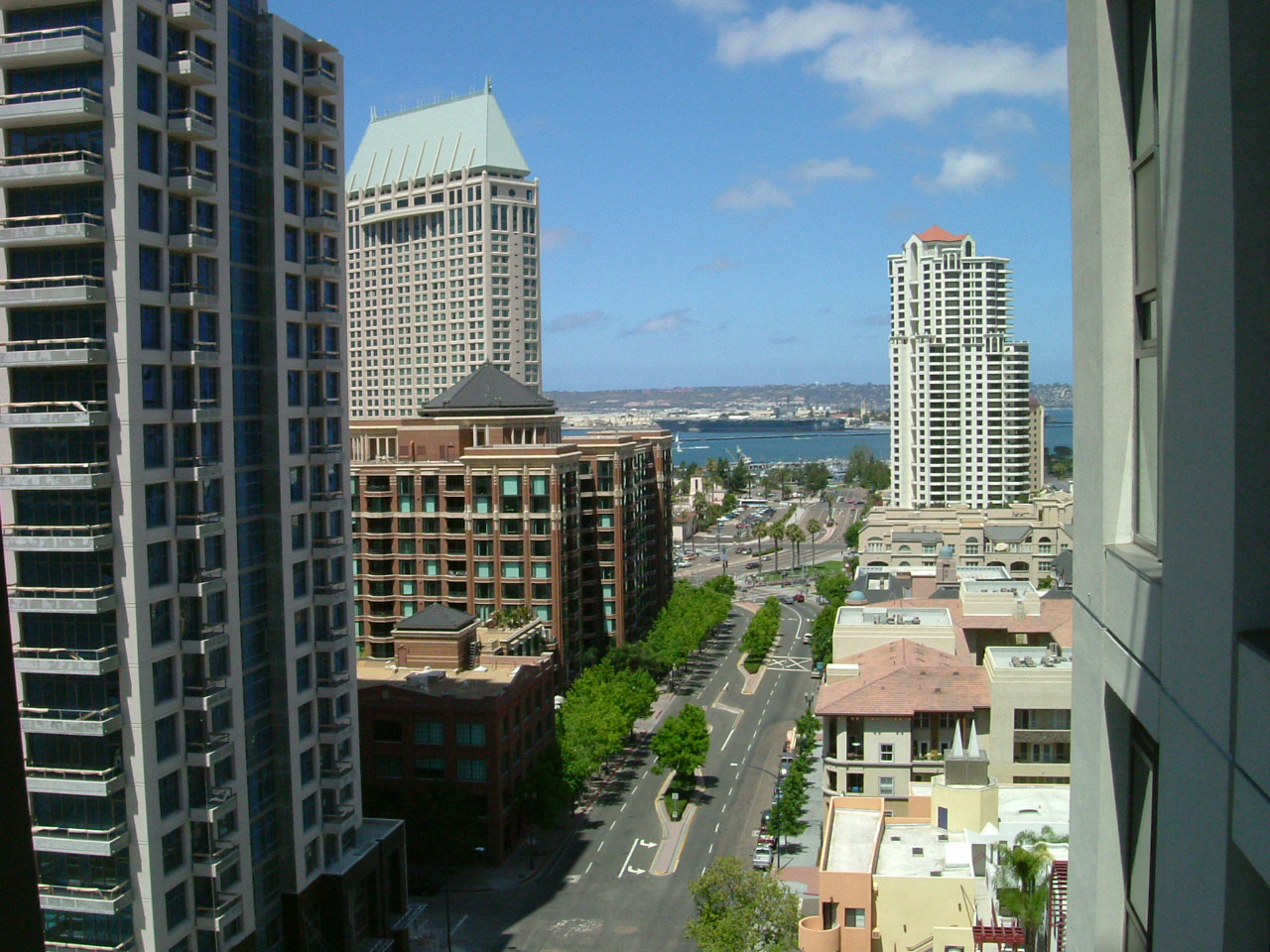
View of west end of Market St., viewed from the 14th floor of Renaissance condominiums, which is located at First and Market.

Marina is bordered to the north by Columbia, bordered to east/southeast by the Gaslamp Quarter, and is bordered to the southwest by the San Diego Marina.

Marina previously comprised various warehouses and vacant lots, now it houses mid-rise and high-rise hotels, apartments, condominiums, medical offices and retail. The Rady Shell at Jacobs Park, Seaport Village and the San Diego Convention Center are located in this neighborhood. Pantoja Park, the oldest park in San Diego, is located in the neighborhood.

== See also ==
- Embarcadero
- Navy Broadway Complex
