= Core, San Diego =

Neighborhood of San Diego, California, US

Coordinates: 32°43′5.34″N 117°9′31.03″W

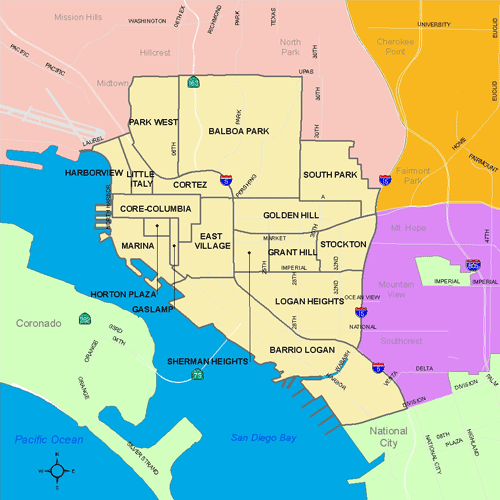
Central portion of San Diego and neighborhood boundaries

Core is a neighborhood in downtown San Diego, California. It is the central business district of downtown San Diego.

The C Street Inn and 101 Ash Street are located in this neighborhood.

== Geography ==
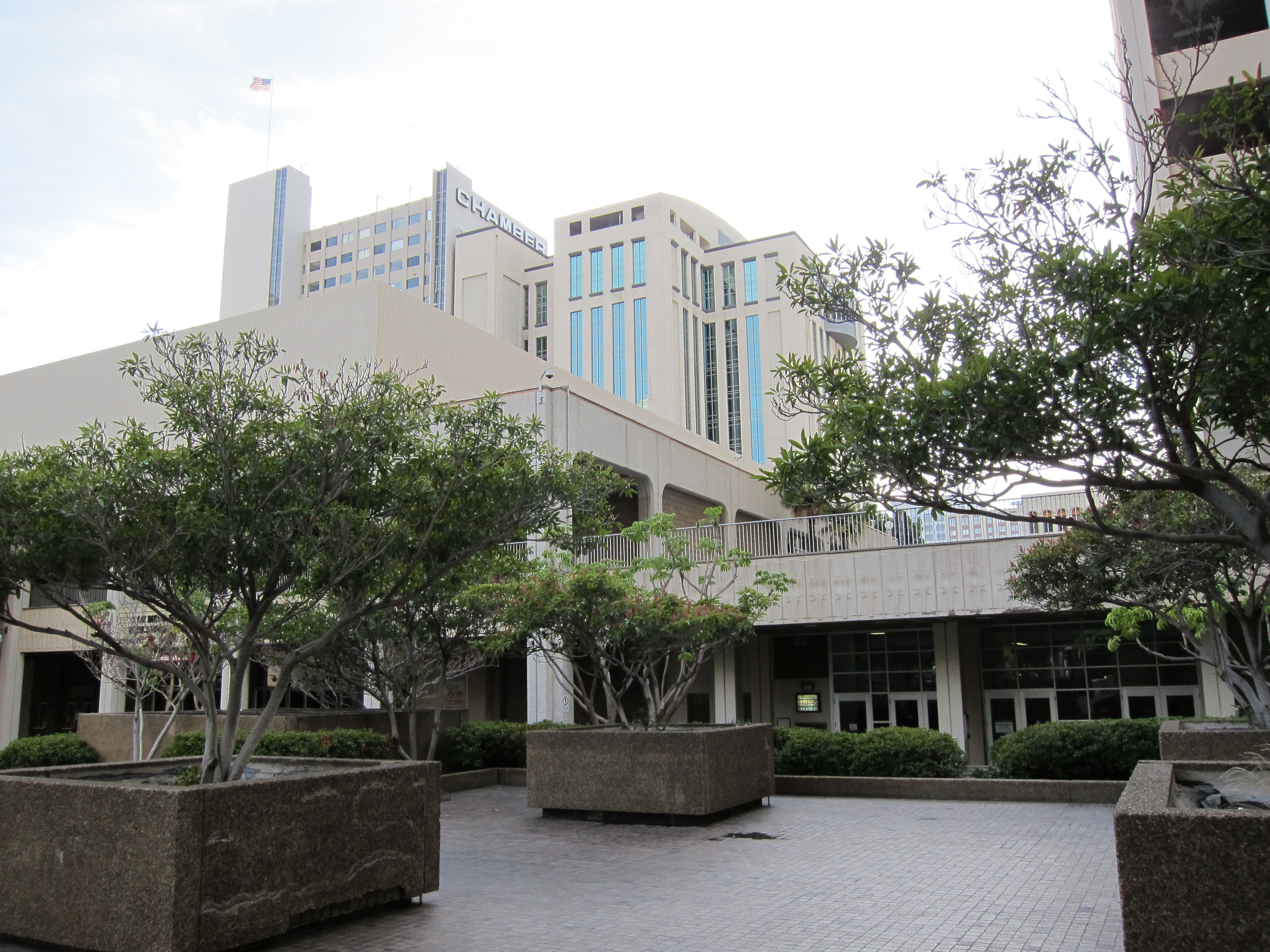
Civic Center Square between A and Ash Streets

This district is located in the center of the city; it is bordered to the north by Cortez Hill, to the northwest by Little Italy, to the south by the Gaslamp Quarter, to the east by East Village and the west by Columbia.
