= Pantoja Park =

Park in San Diego, California, United States

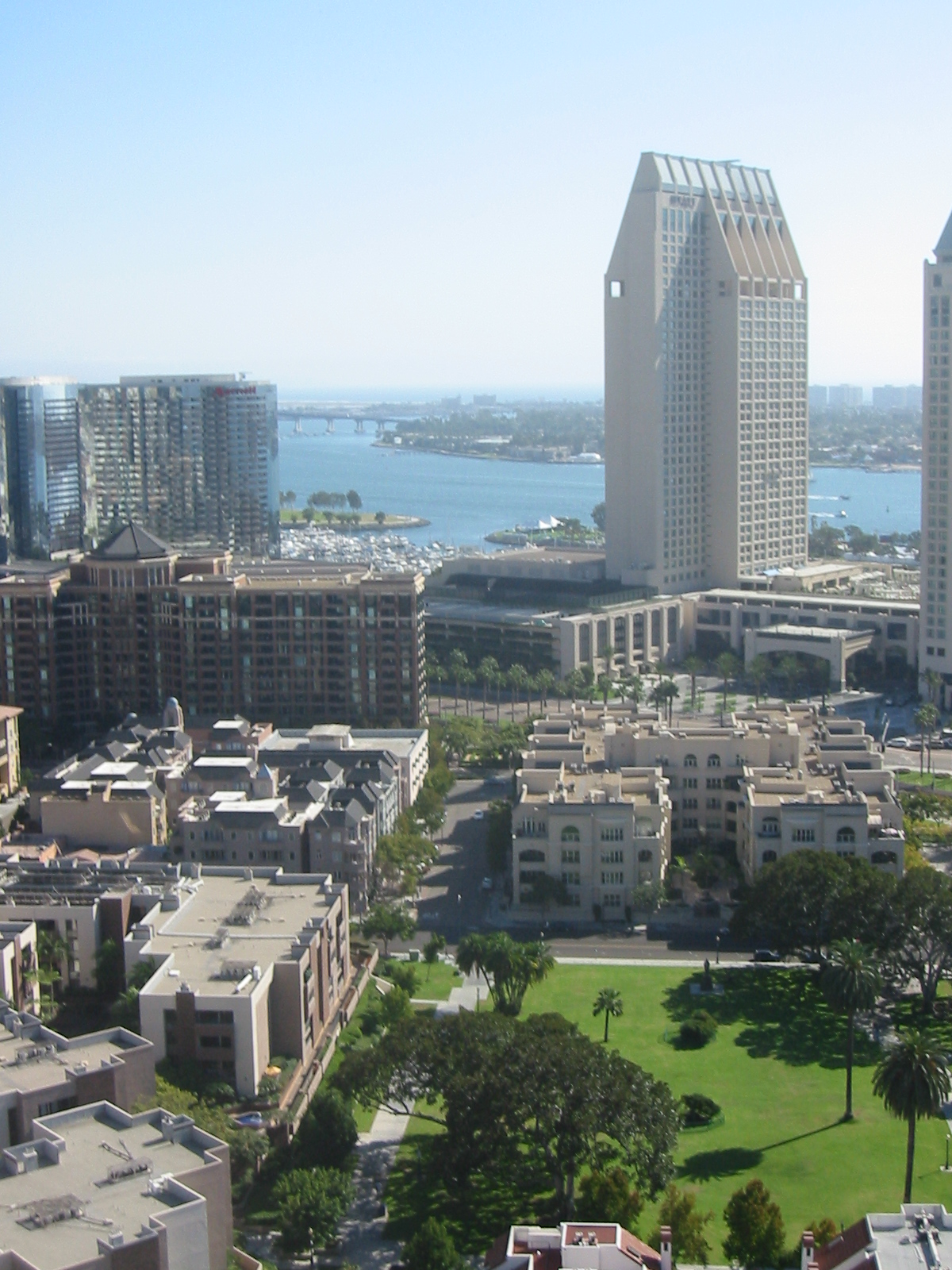
- Pantoja Park (foreground)

- Location within San Diego Location within California Location within the United States
- Type: Public
- Location: San Diego, California, U.S.
- Coordinates: 32°42′47″N 117°10′04″W
- Created: 1850
- Status: Open year round

Pantoja Park is a public park located in the Marina district in downtown San Diego, California. Originally built in 1850, it is the oldest park in San Diego. It is named for Don Juan Pantoja y Arriola, a Spanish navigator who drew the first map of San Diego Bay in 1782. The park was originally named Plaza Pantoja; in the mid-19th century, it was known as New Town Park. It contains a statue of Benito Juárez, a gift from the Mexican government in 1981.

The park features a large grassy area and multiple large mature trees. It has several towering old fig trees, shrubs and flowers, benches, walking paths, and a historic Natal plum planted in the middle of the park. Two years after the formation of San Diego's Historical Resources Board, Pantoja Park was registered as the seventh San Diego Historic Landmark in 1969.
