= Bankers Hill, San Diego =

Upscale neighborhood in the California city

Coordinates: 32.731°N 117.164°W

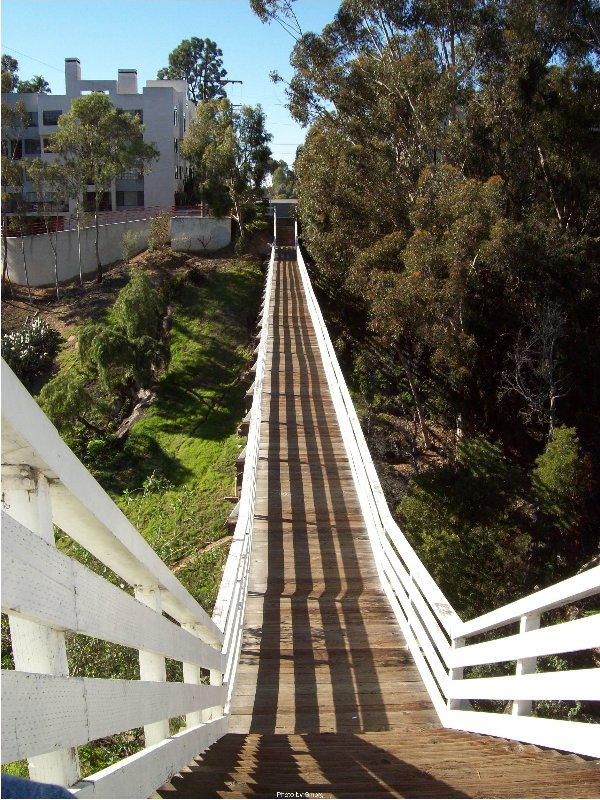
Quince Street pedestrian bridge in Bankers Hill neighborhood of San Diego, California.

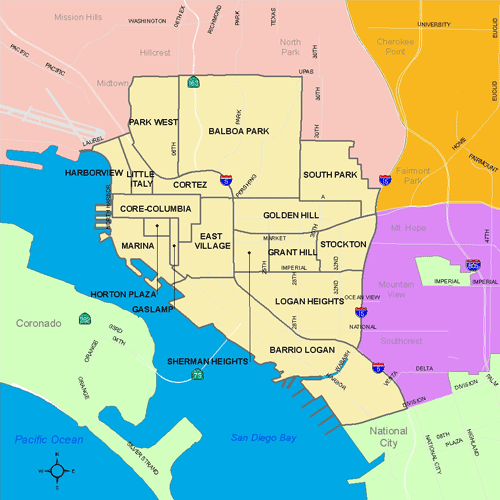
Bankers Hill (Park West) is located in the northwest part of Central San Diego.

Bankers Hill (also known as Park West and formerly known as Florence Heights) is a long-established uptown neighborhood near Balboa Park in San Diego, California. The area acquired the name "Bankers Hill" because of its reputation as a home for the affluent. Many homes date from the late 19th century, some of which have been restored as offices or bed-and-breakfasts. Early twentieth-century architects Irving J. Gill, William S. Hebbard, Richard S. Requa, Hazel W. Waterman, and Frank Mead designed homes in the area.

== Geography ==
It is bordered to the north by Hillcrest, to the south by downtown, to the east by Balboa Park, and to the west by Interstate 5, Little Italy and Midtown. A more constricted definition of the neighborhood sets its eastern boundary as Fourth Avenue and its western boundary as First Avenue.

The area is primarily residential south of Laurel Street and west of Fifth Avenue. There is a small commercial district along First Avenue between Hawthorne and Juniper Streets. There are multiple high-rise condominiums along Fifth and Sixth Avenue facing the park.

Locations further west allow an elevated, panoramic view of downtown, San Diego Bay, San Diego International Airport, Coronado, Harbor Island and Mount Soledad.
