= Santa Monica Seafood =

American foodservice distributor

- Company type: Private
- Industry: Foodservice
- Founded: 1939
- Founder: John Deluca
- Headquarters: Rancho Dominguez, California
- Number of locations: 11 (2024)
- Area served: Arizona; California; New Mexico; Nevada; Texas
- Key people: Roger O'Brien (pres., CEO); Michael Cigliano (chair., exec. VP); Jim Costello (CFO)
- Owner: Cigliano family
- Website: santamonicaseafood.com

Santa Monica Seafood is an American foodservice distribution company serving the Southwestern United States. It exclusively distributes seafood at a wholesale price and has ten physical stores.

The company also has satellite locations in Albuquerque, New Mexico, Baltimore, Maryland, Chicago, Illinois and Denver, Colorado, allowing it to reach most of the U.S., barring the Southeast.

== History ==
John Deluca started the business when he moved from Naples, Italy, to San Pedro, Los Angeles, in 1898 and distributed seafood to support his family. His shop, which was later rebranded to The Albright, was located at the end of the Santa Monica Pier, giving the company its name. The company was not officially incorporated until 1939.

In 2011, it acquired Long Beach Seafood Co., a seafood distributor and longtime competitor. Central Coast Seafood was bought in 2012, increasing Santa Monica Seafood's presence in Central California. The company bought Seattle Fish Company in 2018, allowing for a further reach into New Mexico and Texas. A new logo debuted in 2019. Ethos Seafood was bought in 2020, furthering expansions into the Midwest. Factories in Baltimore, Maryland, and Denver, Colorado, opened in 2023 and 2024, respectively.

== Services ==
The company buys its food in the morning from fishermen in Morro Bay, Santa Monica, and San Diego. There are six hundred species of fish and shellfish supplied by the company, including swordfish, dungeness crab, rockfish, and sablefish. In addition, sea urchin roe, lobsters, oysters, mussels, and clams are sold. Its physical stores contain lines of signature sauces. The company also has two seafood restaurants, in Santa Monica and Costa Mesa, California.

The company's subsidiary, Los Angeles Fish Co., imports Japanese seafood to the U.S. It also supplies fresh fish such as chum salmon and tilapia to Walmart. The University of California, Los Angeles also sources its fish from the company.
