= Navy Broadway Complex =

Coordinates: 32°42′48″N 117°10′15″W

The Navy Broadway Complex is a bayside military facility in downtown San Diego, California. It houses the primary offices of the Navy Region Southwest, and is closely tied to regional United States Coast Guard operations. The Global Advanced Traceability and Control (ATAC) and function is housed in the Navy Broadway Complex.

== History ==
In the early 1900s, Pacific Fleet ships frequently docked in the San Diego harbor at what is now the intersection of Broadway and Harbor Drive. With all the necessary maritime facilities in place, the site became a supply depot. A small pier was constructed in 1922 and the first materials were moved into the Depot's warehouse in February 1923. Subsequent modifications have been made to the depot sporadically through the late 20th century. Starting in April 2017, the Navy Broadway Complex started demolition in order to make way for the Manchester Pacific Gateway, which includes office buildings and a luxurious mall that will cover 12 acres.

== Development ==
Since the complex is on extremely valuable property, the Navy has attempted to finance a portion of operations with revenue from real estate developers seeking to build housing and commercial units. A San Diego developer actually has a lease with the US Navy to build a Navy administration complex, along with hotels, offices and shops, in an area of the complex that currently houses dilapidated buildings and government-only parking. In March 2016 the Navy and developer Doug Manchester won a victory in the 9th Circuit Court of Appeals to allow the development to go forward after many years of delay.
