= Downtown San Diego =

City center of San Diego, California, United States

Coordinates: 32°43′14″N 117°9′16″W

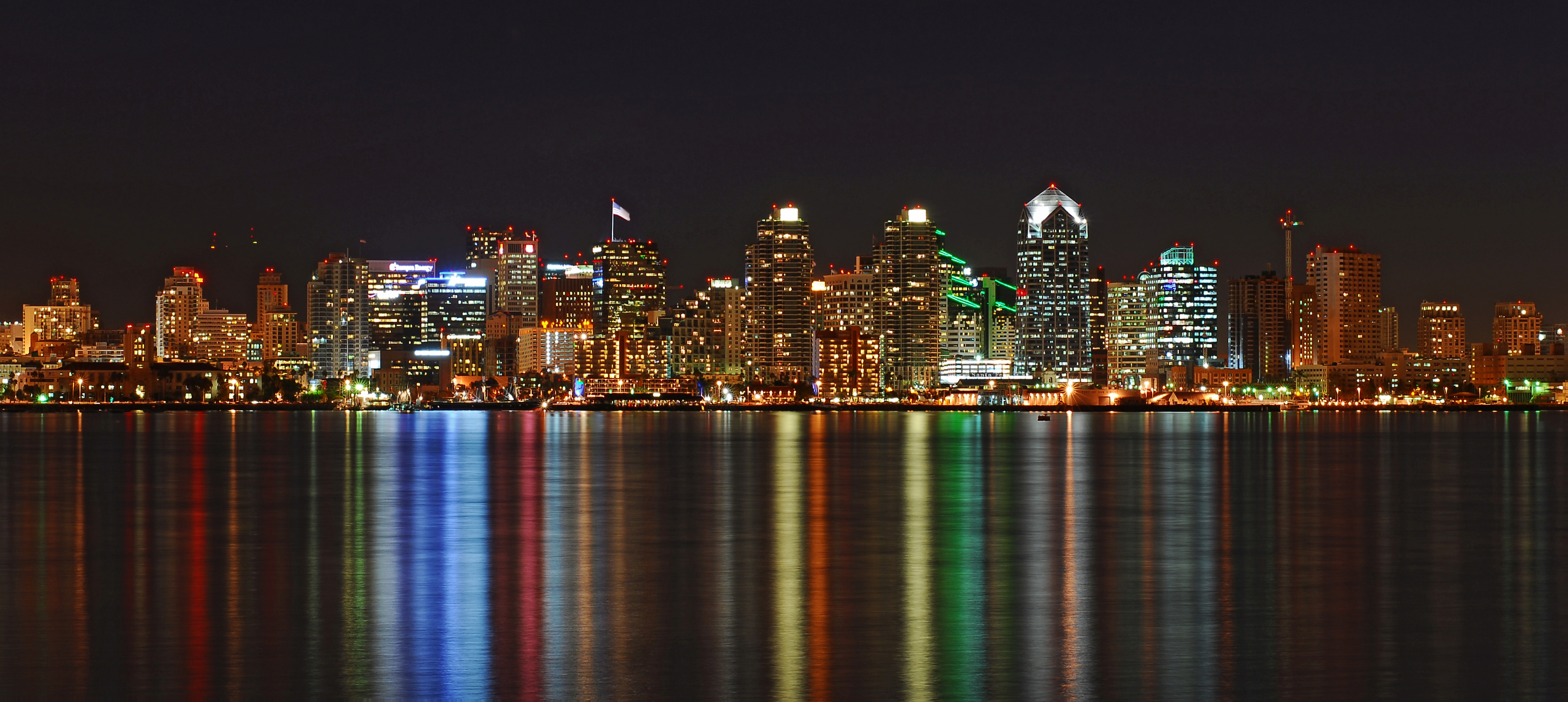
Downtown San Diego skyline from Shelter Island

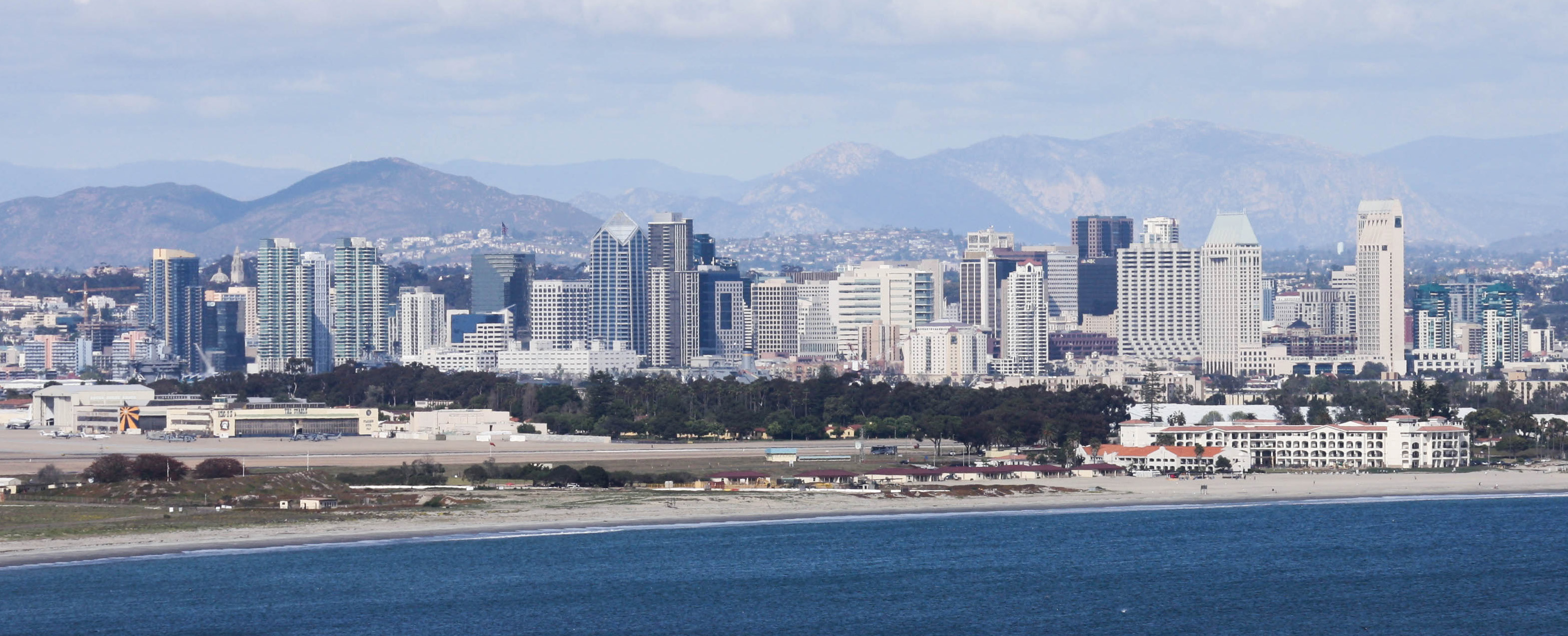
Downtown San Diego skyline from Cabrillo National Monument

Downtown San Diego is the central business district of San Diego, California, the eighth largest city in the United States. It houses the major local headquarters of the city, county, state, and federal governments. The area comprises eight neighborhoods: Gaslamp Quarter, East Village, Columbia, Marina, Cortez Hill, Little Italy, Bankers Hill, and Core.

The downtown area is home of the San Diego Convention Center, the city's primary convention center. It is also home of the San Diego Symphony and the San Diego Opera, as well as several performing arts venues, such as Jacobs Music Center, the Rady Shell at Jacobs Park, and the San Diego Civic Theatre.

Downtown San Diego is located on San Diego Bay, which houses the USS Midway Museum and the Maritime Museum of San Diego. Balboa Park is a historic urban cultural park that borders the area. San Diego International Airport is located three miles (4.8 km; 2.6 nmi) northwest of downtown.

== History ==
The downtown of San Diego was previously inhabited by the Kumeyaay who referred to the area as Tisirr, and also established a village called Pu-Shuyi near what is now Seaport Village.

The city of San Diego was originally focused on Old Town near the Presidio, several miles north of current downtown. The location was not ideal because it was several miles from navigable water. In 1849 Lt. Andrew B. Gray, a surveyor working with the boundary commission to establish the boundaries of the new state of California, suggested that an area closer to San Diego Bay would be a better location for a city because it would be better for trade. He proposed the idea to William Heath Davis, who recruited four other investors. The partners under Davis's leadership purchased 160 acres (65 ha) of land in what is now downtown San Diego. They laid out a street plan for New Town and built a wharf and warehouse. Several people built houses there, including the still-standing William Heath Davis House, now a museum. John Judson Ames wrote a prospectus for a newspaper, the San Diego Herald in December 1850, soliciting advertisements and subscriptions from the towns-people; the first issue was published on May 29, 1851. However, New Town did not do well due to a lack of fresh water, a financial depression in 1851, and opposition from the established settlements in Old Town and La Playa. In 1852, a San Diego grand jury called for the removal of several Kumeyaay villages close to any White settlement and the village of Tisirr was razed to the ground.

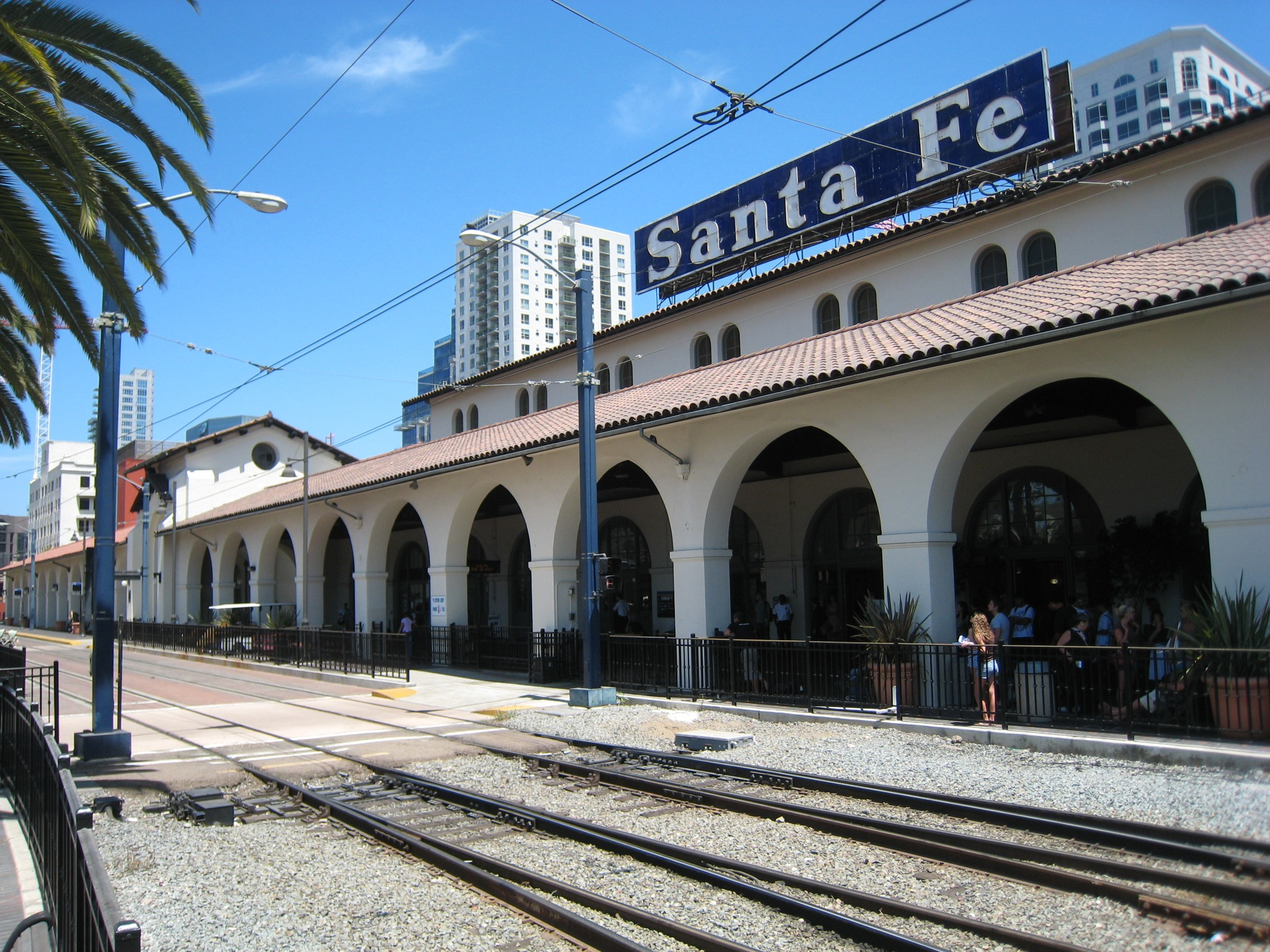
The Santa Fe Depot, built in 1915

In 1867, Alonzo Horton purchased 800 acres (320 ha) of pueblo lands in the current downtown area, and in 1869 he added Davis's 160 acres (65 ha) to his holdings; the area was referred to as the Horton Addition. Davis's wharf had fallen to pieces by then, but Horton realized the area was still ideal for a harbor. He built a new wharf at the end of Fifth Avenue in 1869. He vigorously sold property and gave away land to promote development of the area, fueling the first of San Diego's many real estate speculation booms. People flocked to the area, known as New Town, because of its better access to shipping. In 1871 government records were moved to a new county courthouse in New Town. By the 1880s New Town had totally eclipsed Old Town (as it is called to this day) as the heart of the growing city.

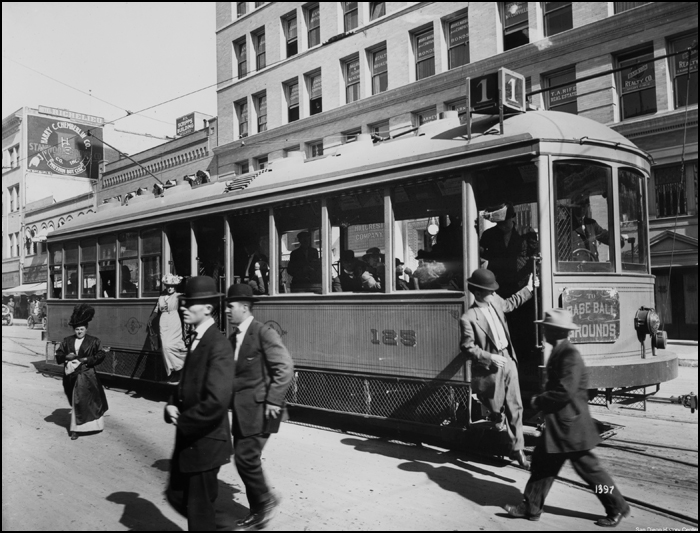
A Class 1 streetcar at 5th and Broadway in downtown San Diego, c. 1915

In 1885, the transcontinental railroad reached San Diego. The Santa Fe railway station opened downtown in 1887 (that station was replaced in 1915 by the downtown landmark Santa Fe Depot, which is still in use). In 1886 the city's first electric lights and first streetcars were established in New Town. In 1912 the Spreckels Theatre opened downtown, the first modern commercial playhouse west of the Mississippi. A new commercial pier, the Broadway Pier, was built by the city in 1913.

In the 1910s, downtown became one of the many San Diego neighborhoods connected by the Class 1 streetcars and an extensive San Diego public transit system that was spurred by the Panama–California Exposition of 1915 and built by John D. Spreckels. These streetcars became a fixture of the neighborhood until their retirement in 1939.

In 1964 the multi-story City Hall and Community Concourse were dedicated on a four-block-square property at 202 C Street. Recent mayors and city councils have discussed building a replacement city hall, but no replacement plan has been approved.

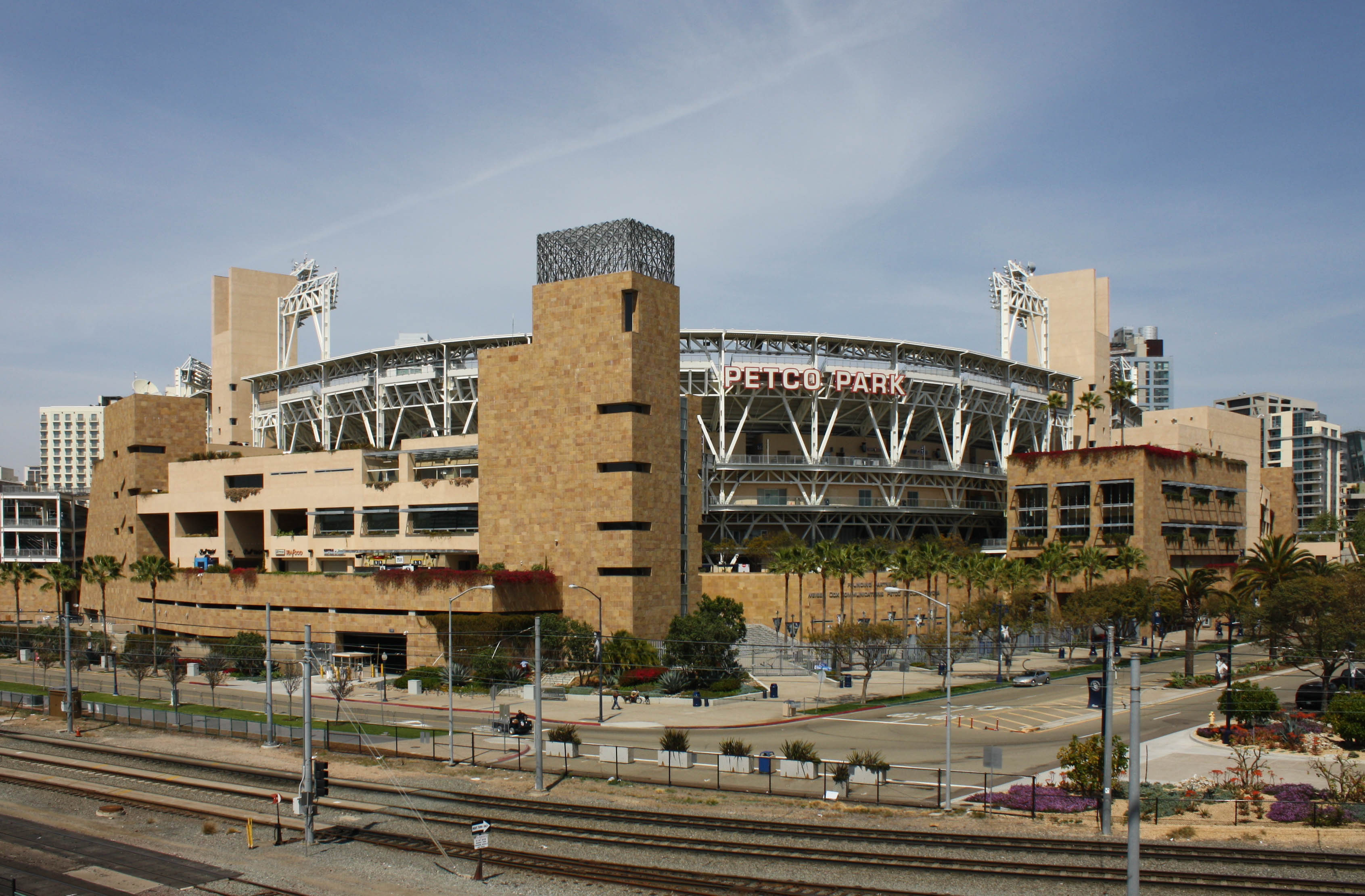
Petco Park

In the 1960s, Centre City began to fall into a state of disrepair and disrepute. Major businesses and stores moved from downtown to suburban shopping malls. The downtown area became known as a hangout for homeless people and sailors on liberty. Tattoo parlors, bars, and strip clubs were predominant forms of business. Trash littered the Gaslamp Quarter, many 19th century Victorian houses were rundown, and there were few buildings of significant size (the tallest building at the time was fourteen stories, the locally famous El Cortez). Despite this, low- and mid-rise buildings were beginning construction.

In 1975, redevelopment plans were created for downtown. These efforts were spearheaded, in part, by councilman Leon Williams, who represented downtown at the time. In 1985, the area underwent more redevelopment with the completion of Horton Plaza, the Gaslamp Quarter revival, and the completion of the San Diego Convention Center. Petco Park, a ballpark used by the San Diego Padres, opened in 2004.

=== Chinatown ===
In the 1860s, the first Chinese people moved to the downtown area. In the 1870s, the Chinese were the primary fishermen in the area. Beginning in the 1880s, a large number of Chinese began to move to San Diego, establishing a concentration; with up to 200 Chinese making up a minority of the 8,600 who lived in all of San Diego. At its peak, about a thousand Chinese lived in San Diego and were faced with discrimination. The concentration became known as Chinatown, and an effort to demolish the area due to the Panama–California Exposition was attempted but the area continued on until World War II. Beginning in the early 1900s, Filipinos began to move to San Diego, and settled in and near Chinatown. In 1995, the Asian Pacific Thematic Historic District was created to preserve the remaining structures that remained from the era when Chinatown, as well as Nihonmachi (Japantown), existed. While a few of the buildings remain, there no longer exist a significant concentration of Chinese Americans in the former neighborhood.

== Geography ==
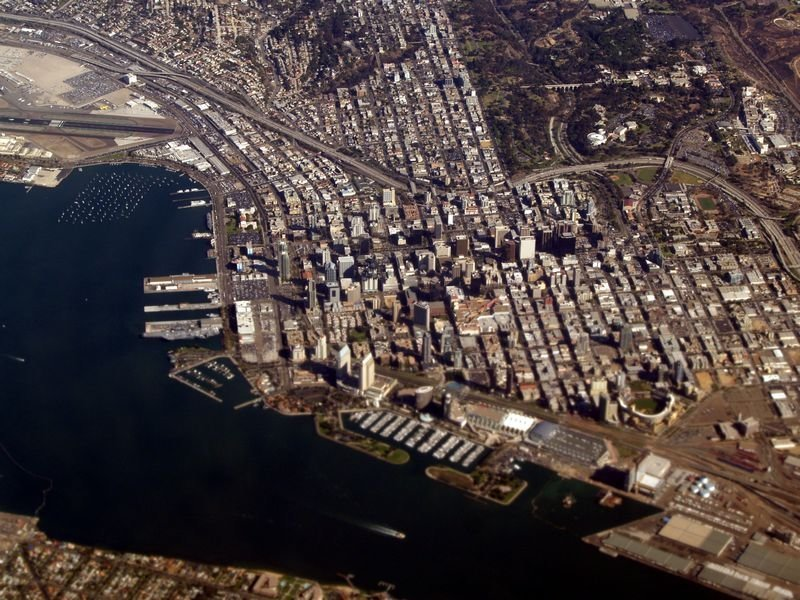
Aerial view of downtown San Diego, 2007

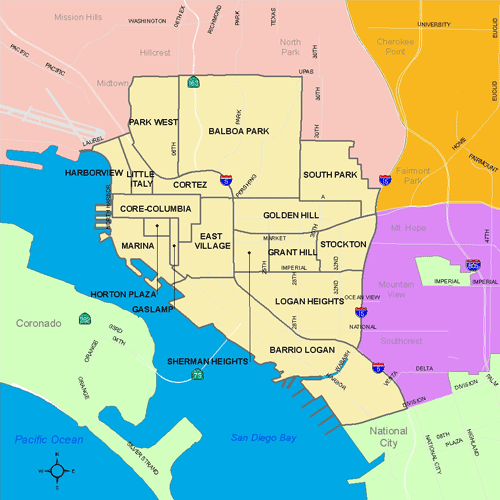
Central portion of San Diego and neighborhood boundaries

Located in central San Diego, downtown San Diego is delimited by San Diego Bay to the west and southwest, Bankers Hill, Middletown, and Balboa Park to the north, Sherman Heights and Golden Hill to the east, and Barrio Logan and Logan Heights to the southeast. San Diego International Airport is just northwest.

=== Districts and neighborhoods ===
- Columbia, the west district of downtown. Located between the Marina and Little Italy, west of Columbia Street.
- Core, the central business district of downtown.
- Cortez Hill, the northeast district of downtown.
- East Village, the east district of downtown, which is home to Petco Park and the surrounding Ballpark Village.
- Gaslamp Quarter, a two- by ten-block nightlife district in central downtown
- Little Italy, the northwest district of downtown.
- Marina, the southwest district of downtown, which is home to Seaport Village and Pantoja Park.

=== Architecture ===
Due to San Diego International Airport's proximity to downtown, there is a FAA imposed 500-foot height restriction on all buildings within a 2.3-mile radius of the runway. The height regulation exists because when planes approach the airport, any structure taller than 500 feet within the radius could interfere with flight operations and potentially result in a collision.

=== Government buildings ===
The United States Postal Service operates the downtown San Diego Post Office at 815 E Street. The city's former main public library is located across the street from it at 8th and E streets, but currently is vacant. A new nine-story Central Library opened in 2013 on Park Boulevard at J Street. Other government buildings downtown include City Hall and other city administration buildings, the San Diego Police Headquarters at 14th and Broadway, the State of California office building at 1350 Front Street, and a three-block federal office complex at 8th and Front streets. County and federal courthouses are also located downtown.

=== Historic landmarks ===
The downtown area contains numerous sites that are listed on the National Register of Historic Places. They include:

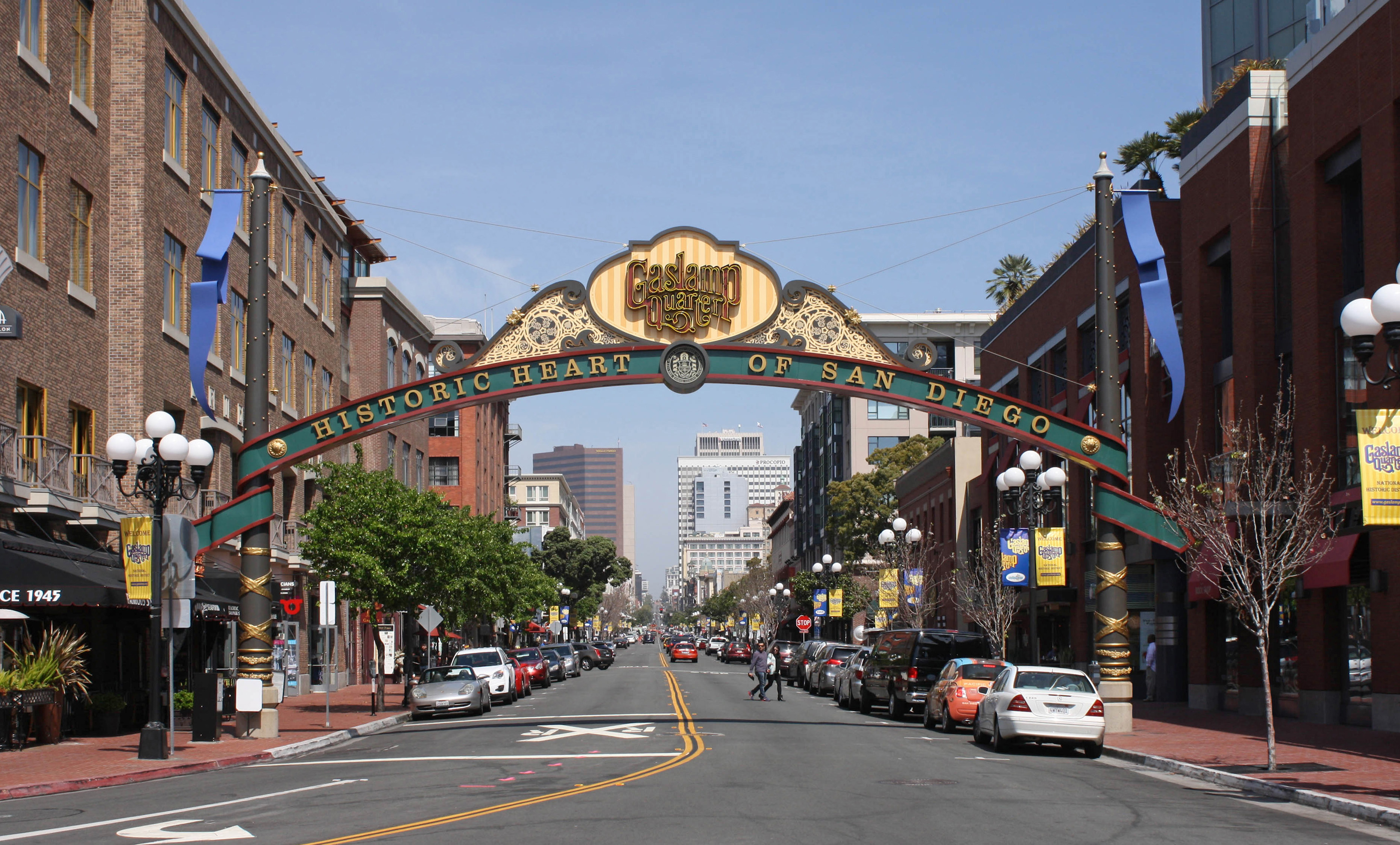
Gaslamp Quarter

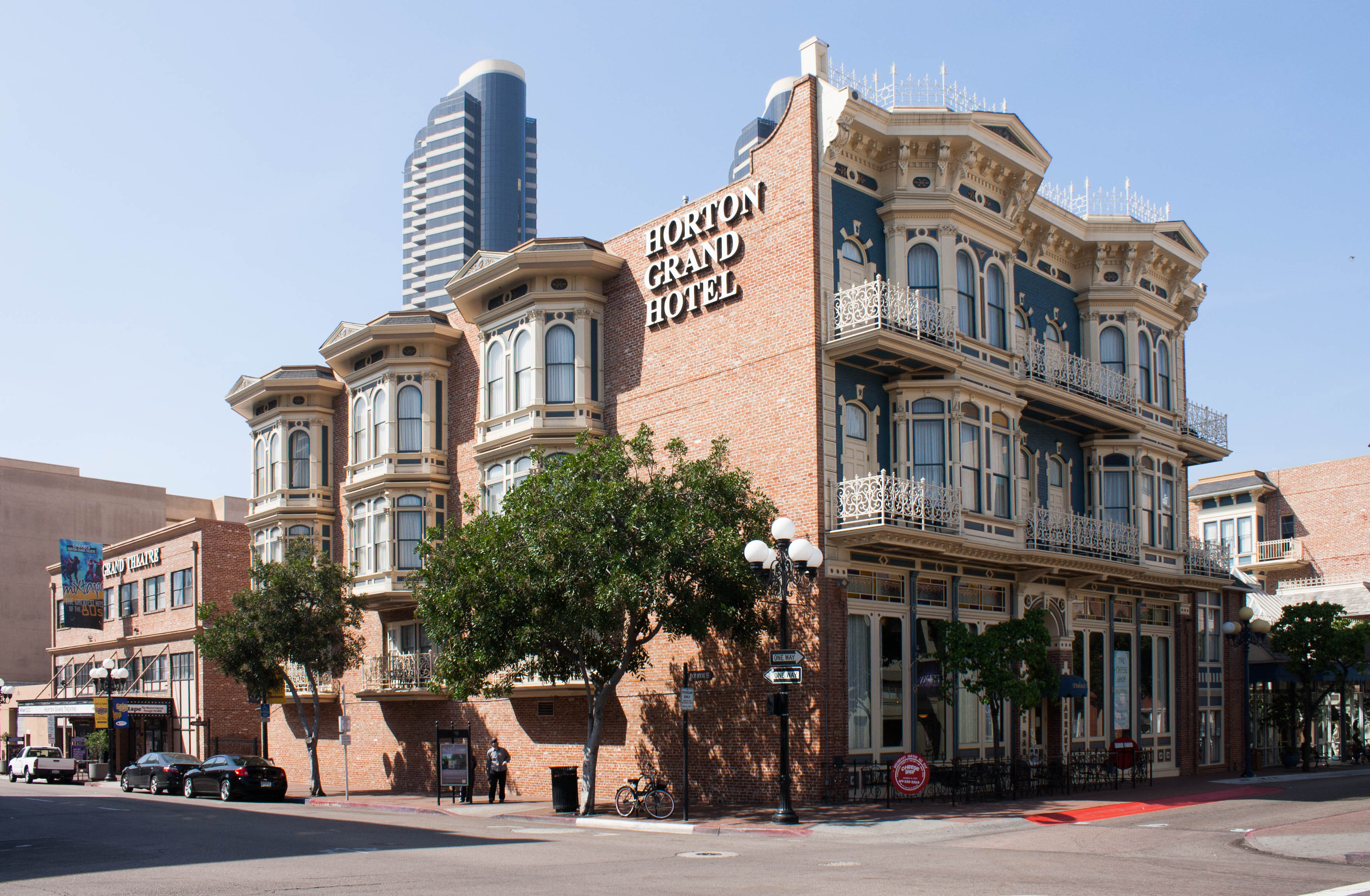
The Horton Grand Hotel

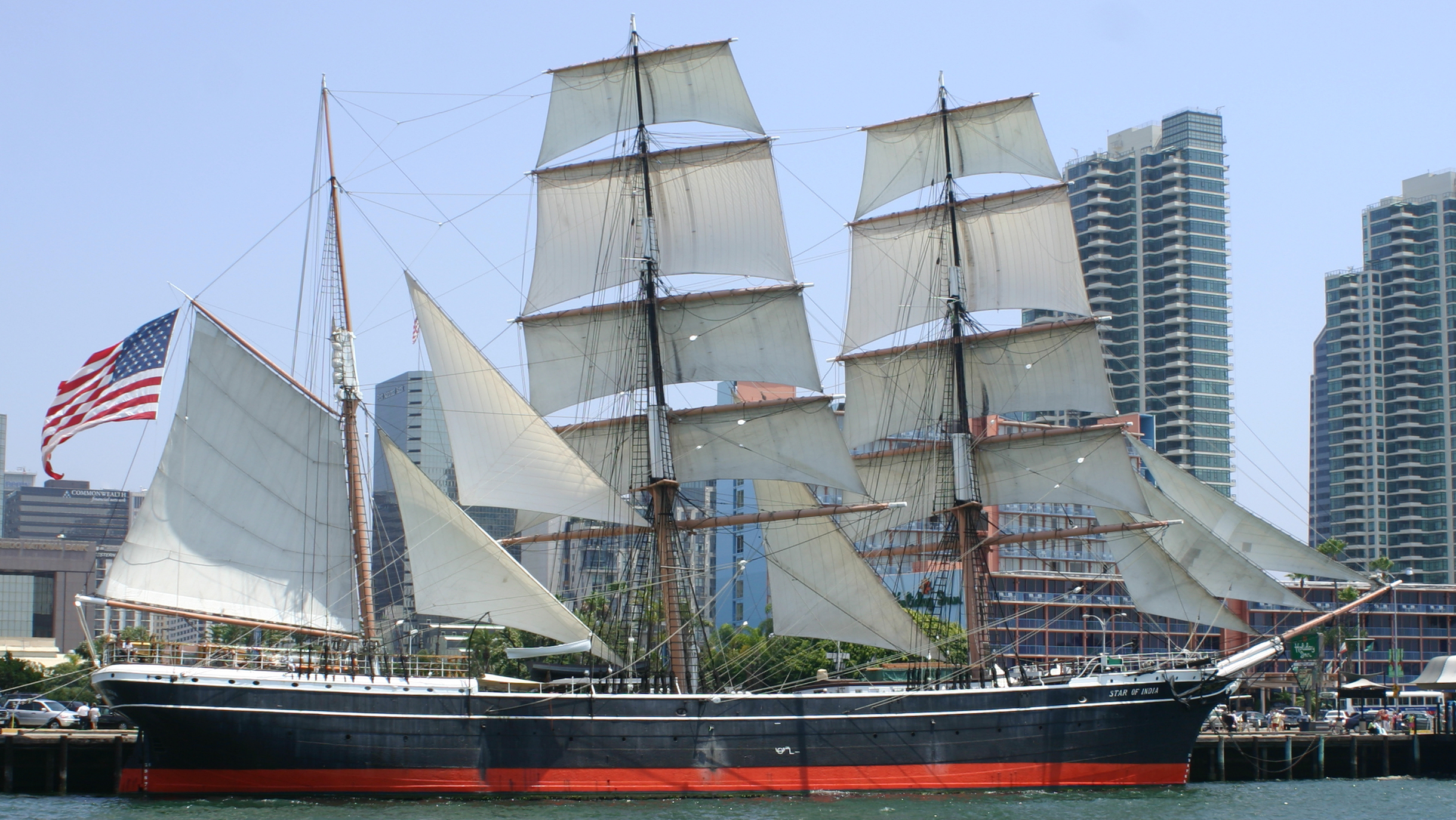
Star of India

- The Gaslamp Quarter Historic District
- Star of India and Berkeley, historic ships berthed at the B Street Pier in downtown
- The Alfred Haines House at 2470 E Street
- The Armed Services YMCA at 500 West Broadway
- The Balboa Theatre at 868 Fourth Avenue
- The C Street Inn at 636 C Street
- The former City of San Diego police headquarters, jail, and courts at 801 Market Street
- Eagles Hall at 733 Eighth Street
- The El Cortez Condominiums at 702 Ash Street
- The Hawthorne Inn at 2121 First Avenue
- The Horton Grand Hotel at 332 F Street
- The Independent Order of Odd Fellows building at 526 Market Street
- The John Ginty House at 1568 Ninth Avenue
- The McClintock Storage Warehouse at 1202 Kettner Boulevard
- The Medico-Dental Building at 233 A Street
- The Panama Hotel at 105 West F Street
- Pantoja Park on G Street and India Street
- The Pythias Lodge Building at 211 E Street and 870 Third Avenue
- The Robert E. Lee Hotel at 815 Third Avenue and 314 F Street
- The San Diego Rowing Club building at 535 East Harbor Drive
- The San Diego Trust and Savings Bank Building at 530 Broadway
- Spreckels Theatre at 121 Broadway
- Santa Fe Depot at 1050 Kettner Street
- The U.S. Grant Hotel at 326 Broadway
- The U.S. post office at 815 E Street
- The U.S. courthouse at 325 West F Street
- The Walker Scott Building and Owl Drug Building at 1014 Fifth Avenue and 402 Broadway

== Arts and culture ==
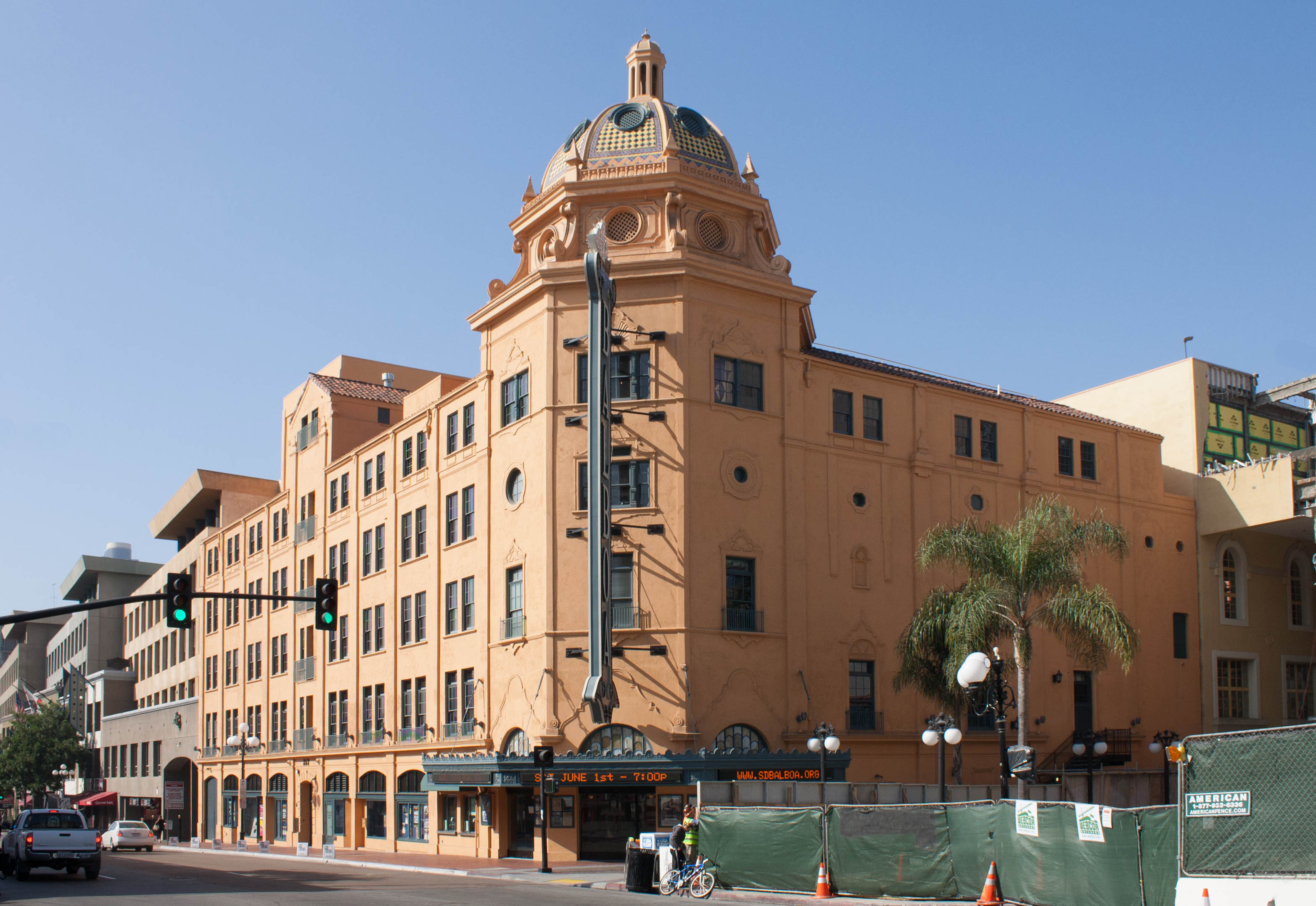
The Balboa Theatre

The San Diego Civic Theatre in the Community Concourse is the home of the San Diego Opera as well as traveling shows. The San Diego Symphony is headquartered at Jacobs Music Center, a renovated movie palace on 7th Avenue originally built in 1929 as the Fox Theater. The Spreckels Theater at 1st and Broadway, in continuous operation since 1912, hosts local and traveling performances and productions. The Balboa Theatre, built in 1924, re-opened in 2008 after extensive renovations as a venue for live performances and concerts. Both the Spreckels and the Balboa theaters are listed on the National Register of Historic Places. Other downtown theaters include the Lyceum in Horton Plaza, which hosts the San Diego Repertory Theatre as well as concerts and art shows, and the Sledgehammer Theater. Nightclubs such as the House of Blues and Croce's feature well-known musical groups. The Museum of Contemporary Art, also located in downtown San Diego, has displayed work across a collection of media since 1950.

=== Filming locations ===
A scene in One Battle After Another was filmed at the Westgate Hotel. Traffic was filmed in the downtown neighborhood and Anchorman: The Legend of Ron Burgundy featured aerial shots of the district as well. Demolition Man was filmed along Harbor Drive near the San Diego Convention Center and America Plaza trolley station. Parts of The Samuel Project were filmed in the Gaslamp district.

South of 8 was produced at Rosewood Five Studios, a performance venue that later became Gray Area Multimedia. Located in the basement of the C Street Inn on Seventh Ave in the Core district, the venue was a production facility for the films Everybody Dies by the End, Friend of the World, and Hacksaw. Other films shot in the downtown neighborhood include In God We Tru$t, My Son, My Son, What Have Ye Done?, and Scavenger Hunt.

=== Tourist attractions ===
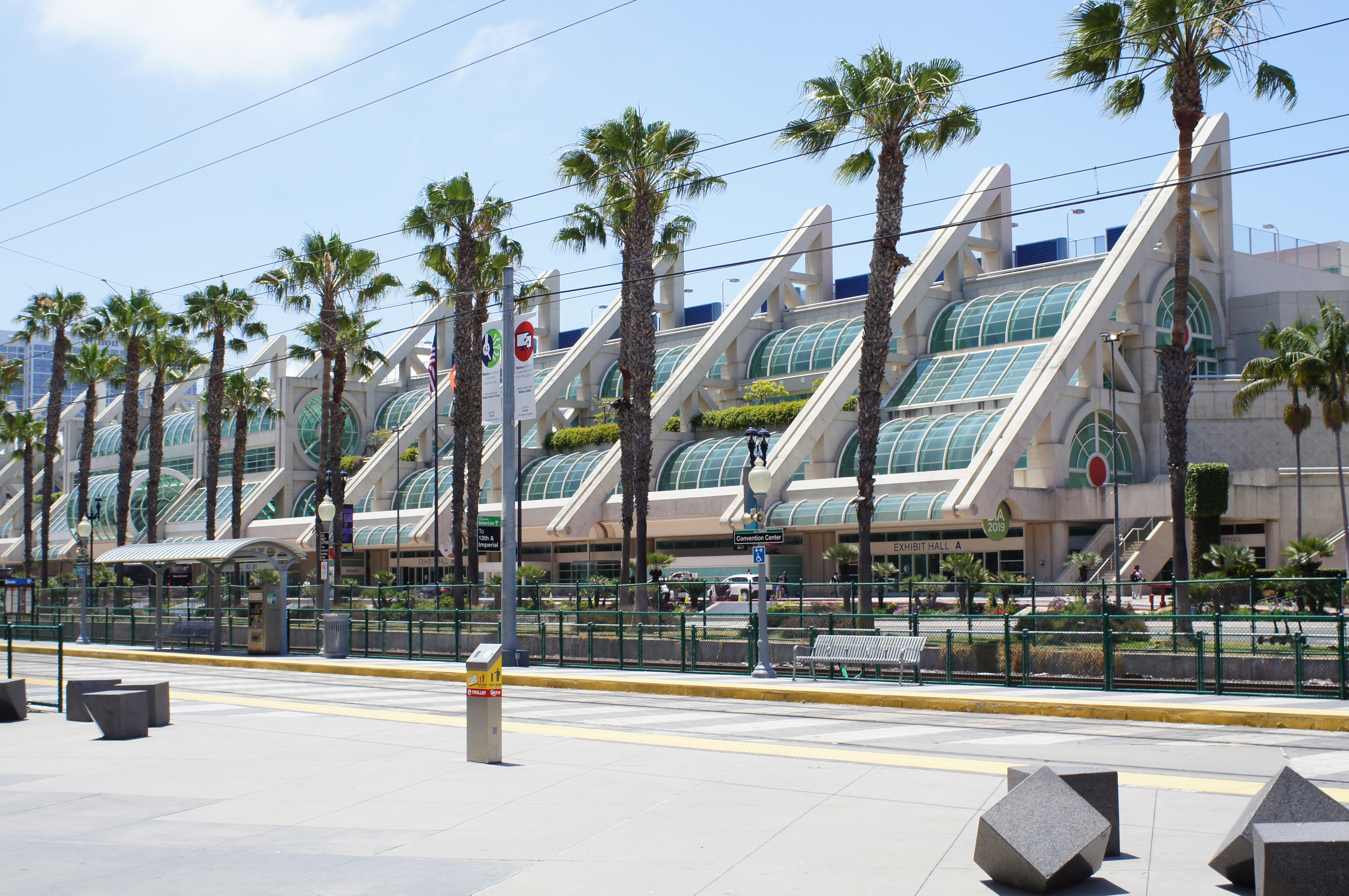
The San Diego Convention Center

The Columbia (waterfront) neighborhood of downtown hosts the USS Midway aircraft carrier museum ship, as well as the eight ships and boats of the Maritime Museum of San Diego, headlined by Star of India.

The San Diego Convention Center and Petco Park are located downtown, as well as Seaport Village.

More than 200 cruise ships a year call at the cruise ship terminal. A passenger ferry connects downtown San Diego with Coronado, and San Diego Bay harbor tours depart from Harbor Drive.

=== Annual events ===
Downtown events include the Big Bay Balloon Parade, held in conjunction with the Holiday Bowl; the Martin Luther King Jr. Day Parade and Festival; the Parade of Lights featuring holiday-decorated boats on the Bay; and the San Diego Street Scene music festival. Every mid to late July, downtown San Diego is transformed for San Diego Comic-Con, the largest entertainment and comic book convention in the world. San Diego Comic-Con is held inside the San Diego Convention Center, but the convention has expanded to other nearby hotels, parks, and plazas which include the Manchester Grand Hyatt Hotel, Marriott Marquis San Diego Marina, Hilton San Diego Bayfront, Omni San Diego Hotel and the Gaslamp Quarter as major supporting venues. Annually each Halloween season, The Haunted Hotel resided in the area from 1993 to 2019, before it relocated to Mission Valley.

== Education ==
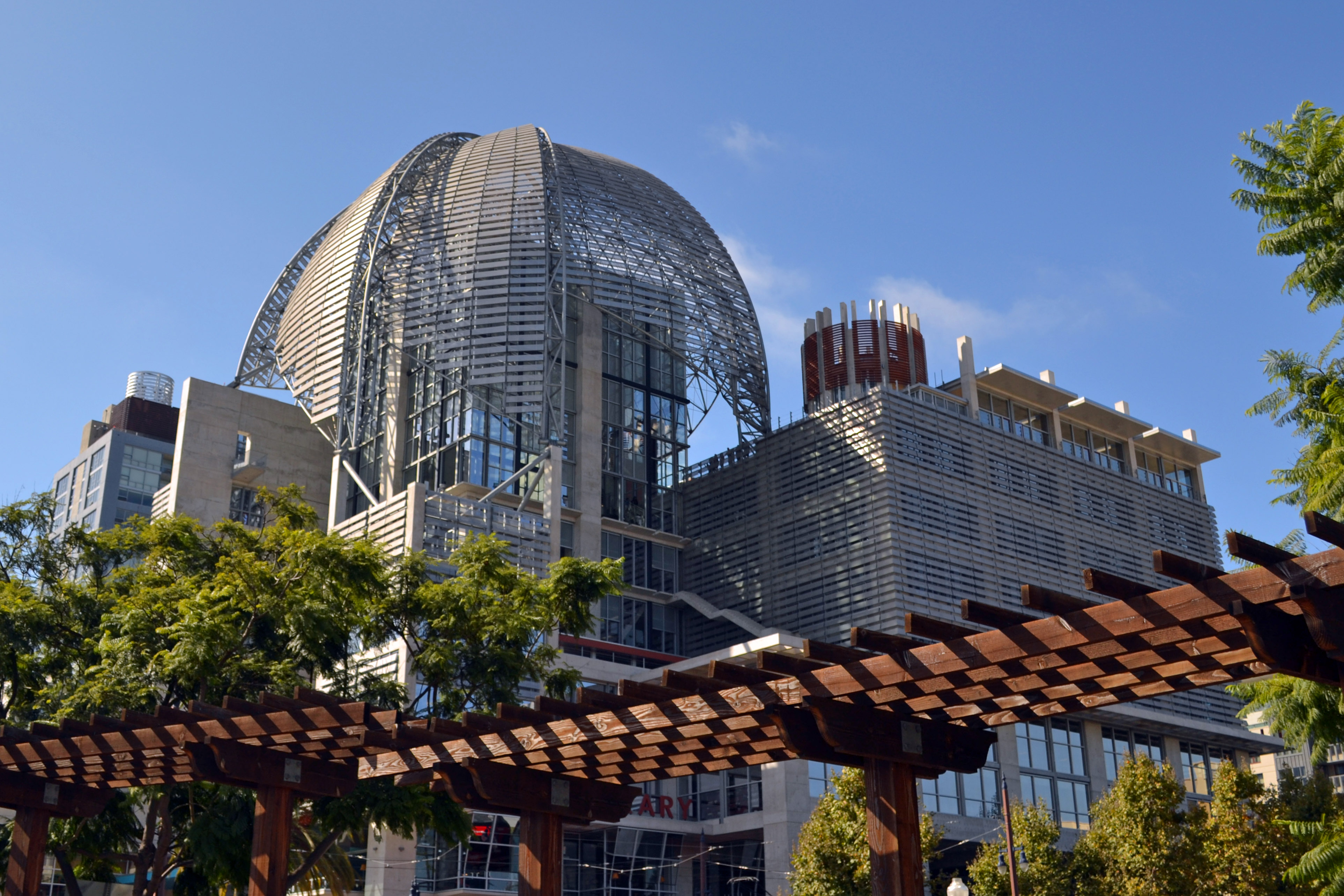
The downtown Central Library opened in 2013

The downtown area is served by San Diego Unified School District. Washington Elementary School is located in the downtown area. San Diego High School and San Diego City College are located in the northeastern corner of downtown adjacent to Balboa Park. Middle school students from downtown attend Roosevelt Middle School in the Balboa Park area. The charter high school e3 Civic High School is located inside the downtown library. Monarch School, a public K-12 school for students who are homeless or affected by homelessness, is also located downtown.

A few private or religious schools exist in the area. California Western School of Law is located downtown.

== Infrastructure ==
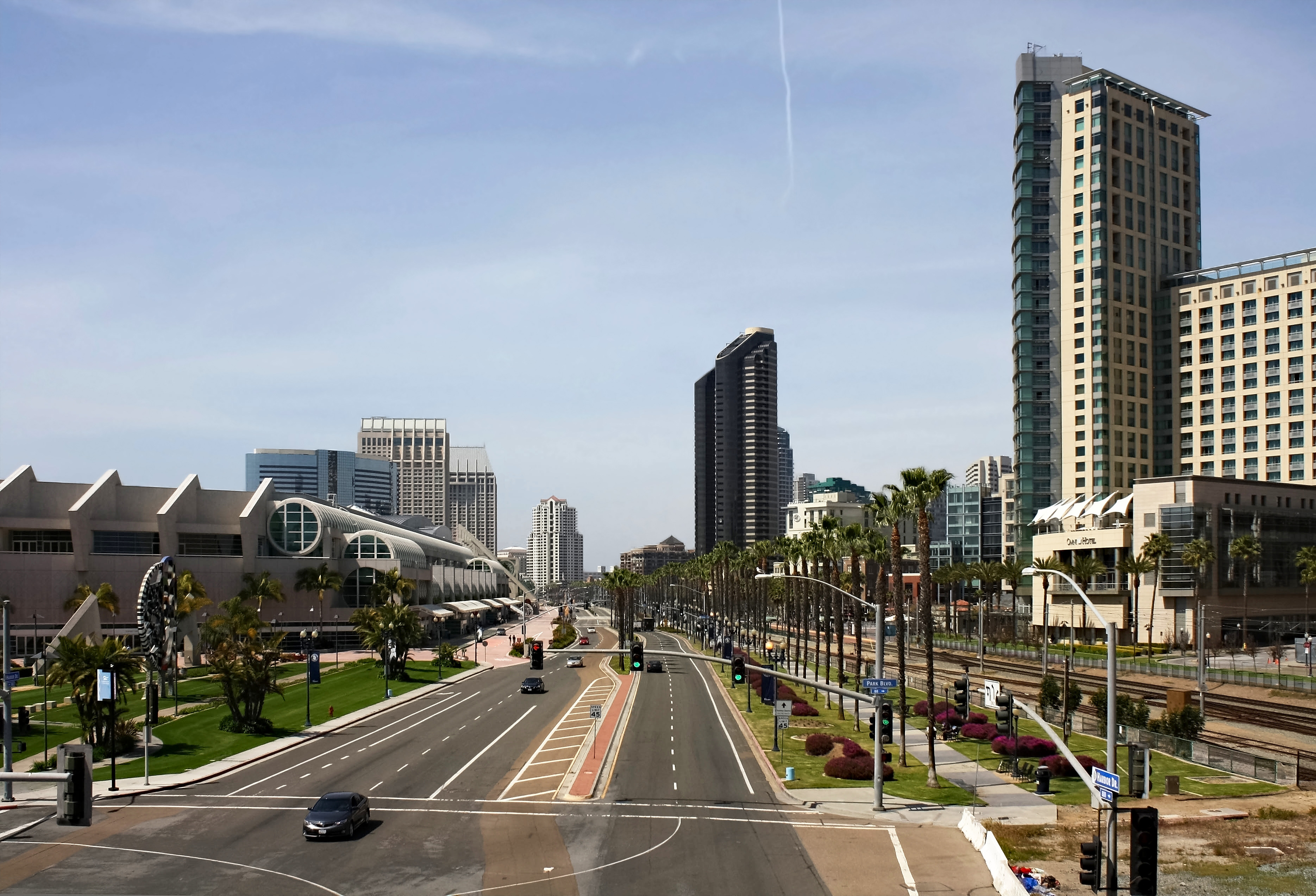
Harbor Drive

Streets are laid out in a grid pattern and many are designated for one-way traffic. North–south roads have both names and numbers. The named roads begin with Harbor Drive and then move east past Pacific Highway, Kettner Boulevard, India, Columbia, State, Union and Front streets. The roads are then numbered and are called avenues, starting at 1st Avenue and continuing to Park Boulevard (12th Avenue). The general pattern is that even numbered streets go south, and odd numbered streets go north. East–west streets are laid out alphabetically from A to K, with the exception of D, H and I, which are replaced with Broadway, Market Street and Island Avenue, respectively. Streets north of A Street are named after trees, starting with Ash Street and going up to Laurel Street.

Main thoroughfares include Broadway and Market Street (east–west), and Harbor Drive, Pacific Highway and Park Avenue (north–south).

Three freeways either pass through or start/end in downtown San Diego. State Route 163 (SR 163) ends in downtown with the southbound lane of the freeway becoming 10th Avenue and 11th Avenue becoming the northbound lane at Ash Street. Interstate 5 (I-5) passes above the downtown area and is accessible from selected streets outside of the actual downtown area or at the intersection of 10th/11th and Ash (where 163 starts and ends). Additionally, SR 94 enters downtown from the east, with westbound SR 94 becoming F Street and G street becoming eastbound SR 94.

The downtown area is served by the San Diego Metropolitan Transit System, the San Diego Trolley. There is also a commuter train linking downtown with northern San Diego County, called the Coaster, which also stops at communities along the San Diego County coastline, as well as the Amtrak passenger rail system.

Parking is mainly concentrated in various "pay to park" lots, with metered parking spaces alongside most streets. There is also parking available at the County operation center (located between Harbor Drive and Pacific Highway, just north of Ash), as well as Seaport Village.

== See also ==
- North Embarcadero Visionary Plan
- Stingaree, San Diego
