= Little Italy, San Diego =

- Neighborhood of San Diego
- Little Italy
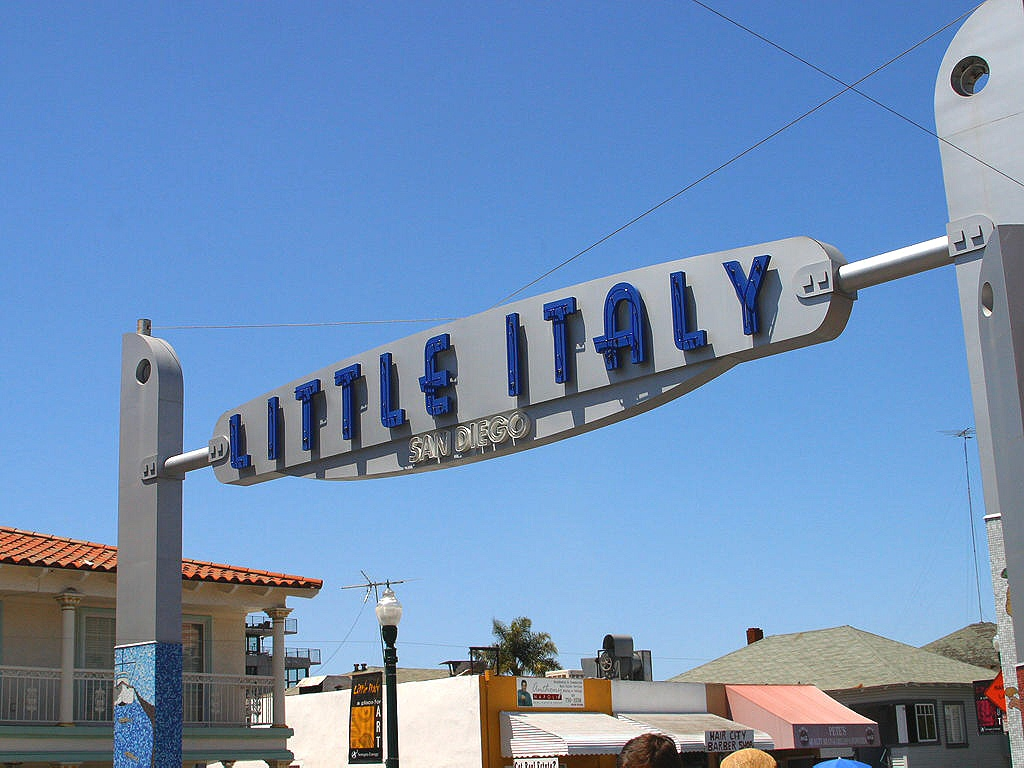
- The Little Italy sign

- Location within Central San Diego Little Italy, San Diego (California) Little Italy, San Diego (the United States)
- Coordinates: 32°43′27″N 117°10′2″W
- Country: United States of America
- State: California
- County: San Diego
- City: San Diego

Area
  - Total: 0.187 sq mi (0.48 km^{2})
  - Land: 0.187 sq mi (0.48 km^{2})

Population (2015)
  - Total: 5,000
  - Density: 26,738/sq mi (10,324/km^{2})
- ZIP Code: 92101
- Area code: 619
- Website: littleitalysd.com

Little Italy is a neighborhood in downtown San Diego, California, that was originally a predominantly Italian and Portuguese fishing neighborhood. It now consists of Italian restaurants, grocery stores, home design stores, art galleries and residential units.

Little Italy is an active downtown neighborhood, with frequent festivals and events including a weekly farmers market, also known as the Mercato (the Market, in Italian). It is maintained by the Little Italy Neighborhood Association, which looks after trash collection, decorations, and special events.

== Geography ==
Little Italy is located in the northwest end of downtown, a few blocks from the Embarcadero. It is located north of Columbia, south of Middletown, southwest of Core, southwest of Bankers Hill/Park West and west of Cortez Hill. The neighborhood is located on the side of a hill, with a significant rise in elevation as one approaches Interstate 5.

The district is bordered by West Laurel Street to the north, West Ash Street to the south, Interstate 5 and Front Street to the east and San Diego Bay and Pacific Highway to the west.

India Street, the commercial corridor, runs through the heart of Little Italy, intermingled with high-density mixed-use buildings and single-family bungalow-style historic properties in a highly walkable 48-square-block area.

== Tuna industry ==
From the 19th century through the 1970s, Italian-Americans, chiefly from the Italian Riviera and Sicily, led the enterprise in the building of the boats that founded the American tuna fishing fleet and canning industry based in San Diego, the "tuna capital" of the American West Coast. The first large tuna cannery, the Pacific Tuna Canning Company, was founded in 1911. By the mid-1930s the canneries employed more than 1,000 people. Due to rising costs and foreign competition the last of the canneries closed in the early 1980s. A large fishing fleet supported the canneries, mostly staffed by immigrant fishermen from the Portuguese Azores and Italy, whose influence is still felt in neighborhoods like Little Italy and Point Loma.

Following the 1906 San Francisco earthquake and fire, many Italian fishermen moved to San Diego. The construction of Interstate 5 in the 1970s split the neighborhood, with the area east of the Interstate becoming part of Bankers Hill. There is a sculpture dedicated to the cannery workers in Barrio Logan and a "Tunaman's Memorial" statue on Shelter Island.

== Development ==
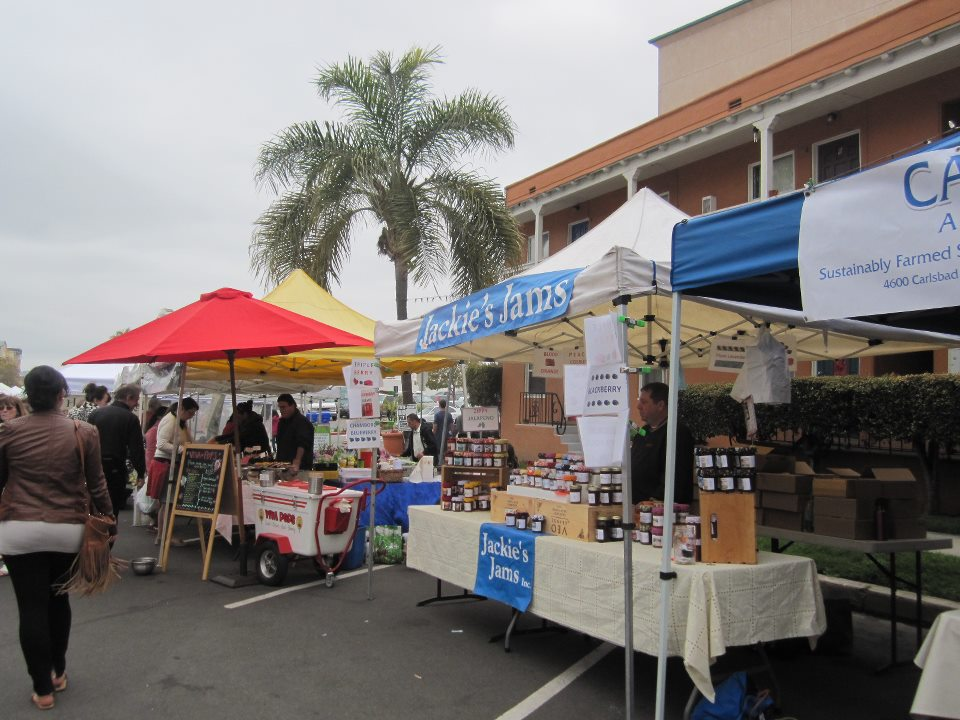
Farmers market in Little Italy, San Diego

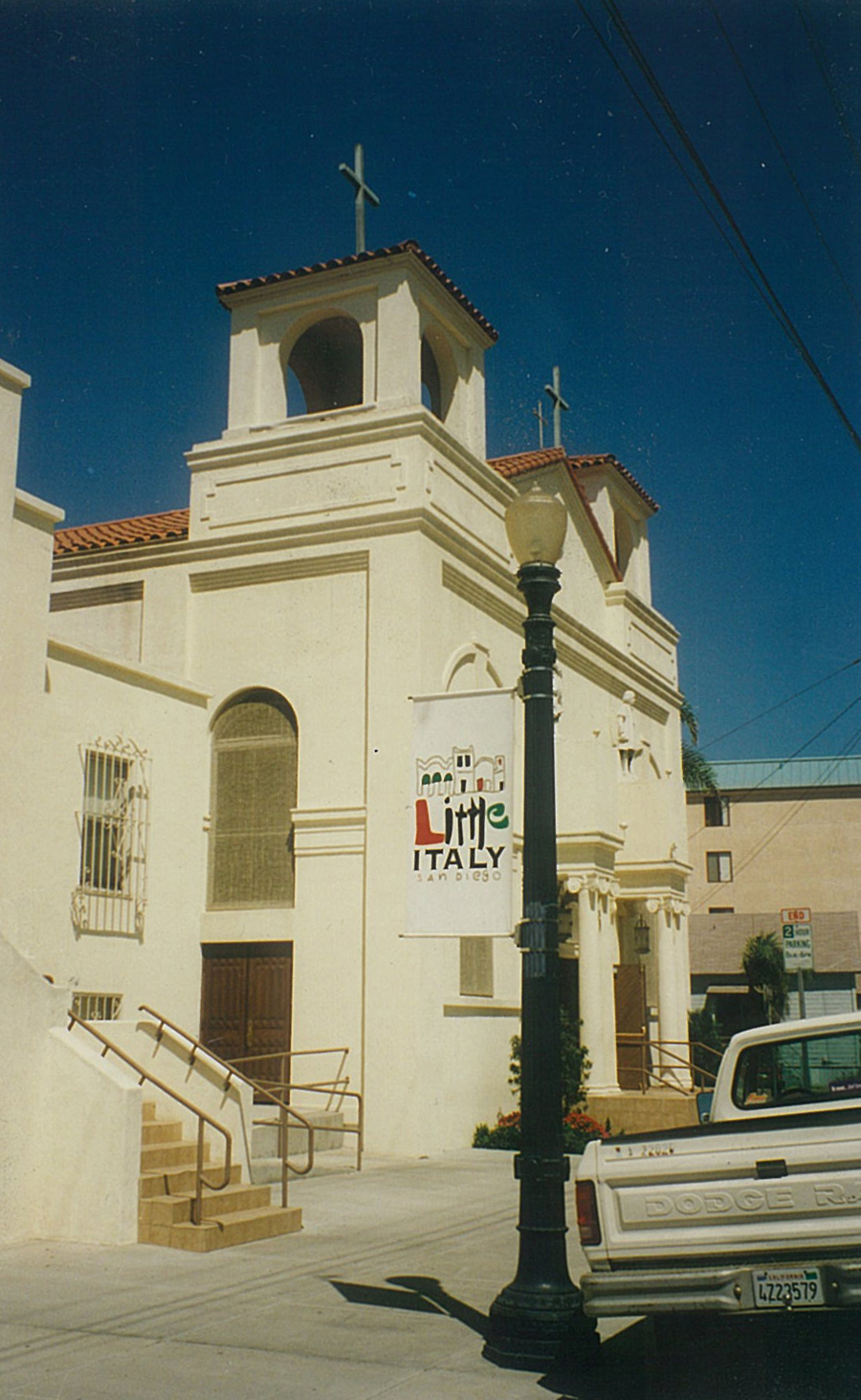
Our Lady of the Rosary Church, Barnabites fathers

There are multiple public improvements and high-rise and mid-rise buildings under construction or approved and scheduled for construction. The northern part of Little Italy is less densely populated than the southern part of Little Italy, which is mainly made up of high-rise and mid-rise buildings. Some older buildings have been renovated for new uses; newer buildings aim to duplicate the feel of the original establishments. The main street, India Street, features public art and plazas, street trees, galleries and antique stores, and numerous restaurants with outside eating areas.

== Community groups ==
Little Italy has a Business Improvement District and a Community Benefit District that is maintained by the Little Italy Association (LIA), a public benefit 501(c)3 corporation established in 1996 to oversee and expedite the revitalization and beautification of Little Italy. The Association represents the residents, property owners, and businesses of Little Italy.

The Italian Cultural Center of San Diego, a 600-member non-profit organization founded in 1981 for people interested in Italian culture and language, is located in this neighborhood.

The Italian Cultural Center of San Diego primary goal is to promote the diffusion of Italian culture in all its varied forms. In order to achieve this goal, the organization has always emphasized the importance of teaching the Italian language as a way to guarantee access to a wider cultural context. The Italian Cultural Center of San Diego offers a variety of cultural events, workshops, lectures and classes at all levels, year round. Classes are taught by native speakers who have been part of the Italian language-teaching scene for several years.

The Convivio Center & Little Italy Heritage Museum is Little Italy's newest destination for arts, culture, heritage and all things Italian in San Diego. The Center serves as a community resource and provides programs and events and something for everyone.

== Annual events ==
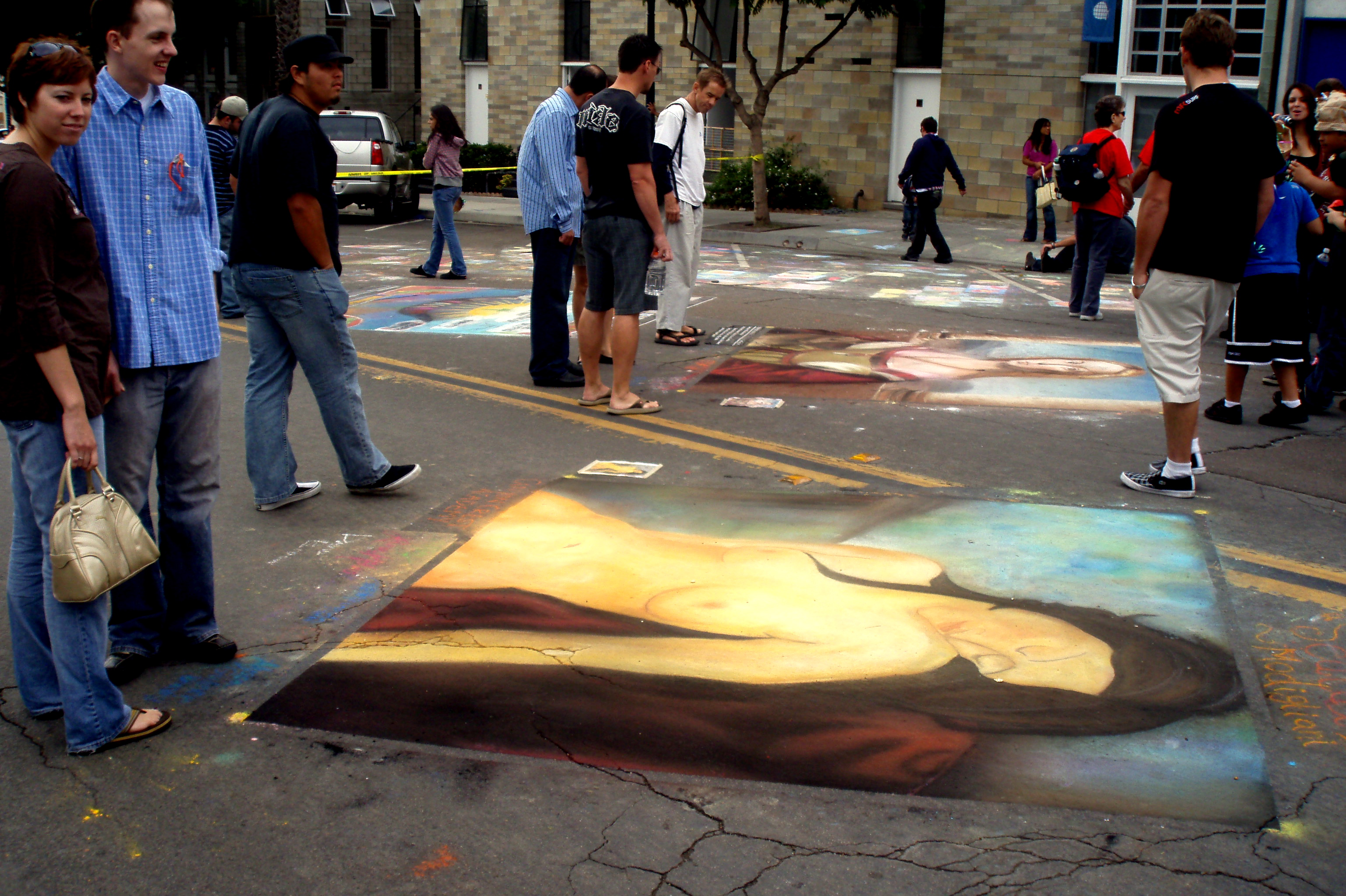
2007 Corso degli Artisti Street Painting Festival

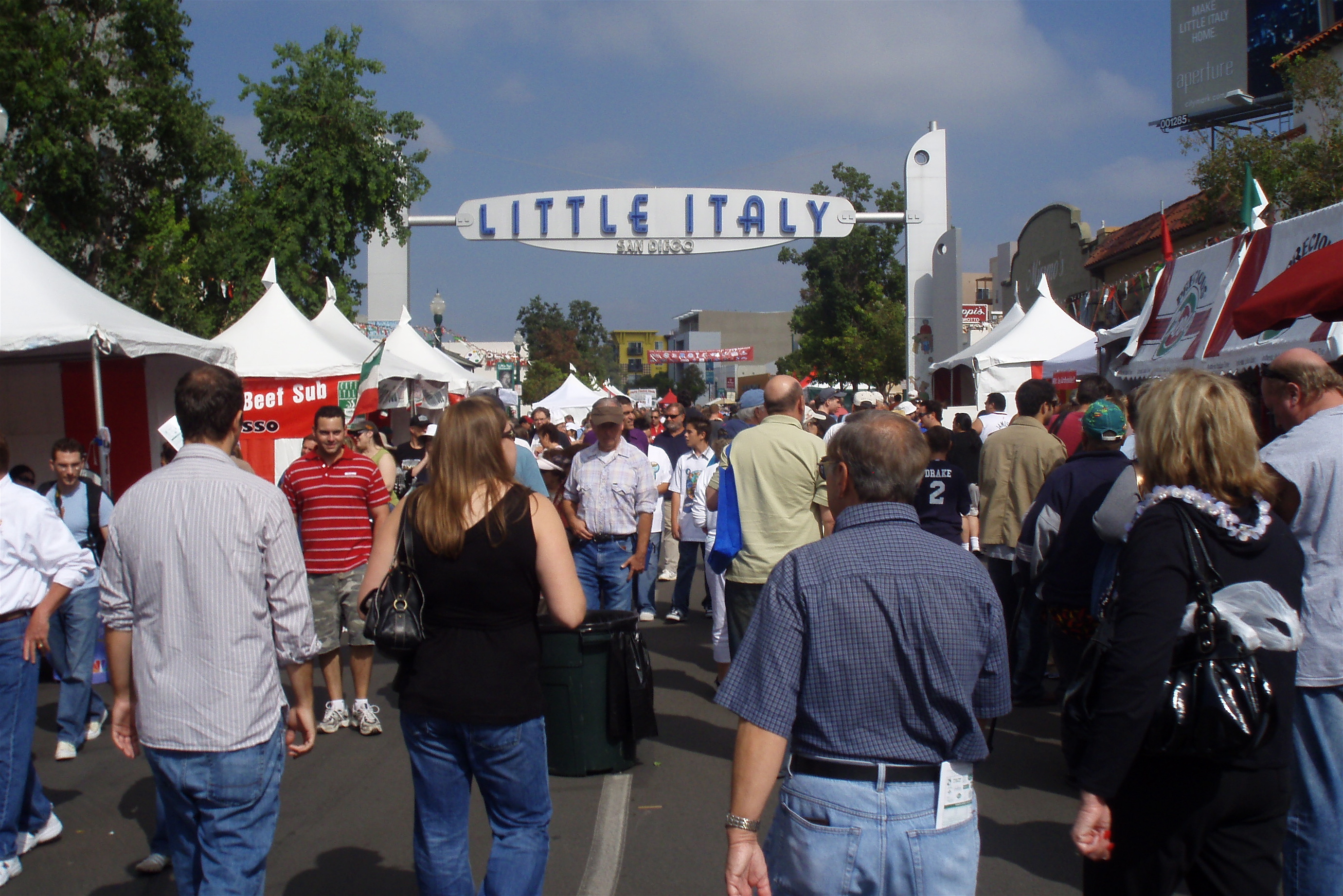
2007 13th annual Precious Festa

The majority of events held are related to Italian culture. Most of the events center on and around India street, usually bordered by Grape street to north and Beech Street or Ash Street to the south.

Every Saturday, 8:00am – 2:00pm, on W. Cedar Street and every Wednesday, 9:00am – 1:00pm, on W. Date Street; Little Italy hosts the Little Italy Mercato. This Italian farmers' market features freshly caught fish, vegetables and fruit from local farmers, pastries from local bakeries, flowers and plants from local farms, and art from local artists.

The Saturday before Mardi Gras, there is the Little Italy Carnevale, a Venetian mask event with several vignettes of entertainment and an open house for retail shops and restaurants.

In April, there is ArtWalk, the largest art event in the west coast with over 120,000 people coming to purchase various mediums of art - paintings, photography, jewelry, furniture and more. Also in April, there is Gran Fondo (Big Ride) Colnago San Diego, where over 3,000 bicycle riders from all over the world come to ride throughout "America's Finest City" in a 32, 53 or 100 mile ride that starts under the Little Italy landmark sign.

In May, the Sicilian American community of San Diego celebrates the Sicilian Festival, the first Italian festival held in Little Italy, launched in 1993. It features Italian and Sicilian entertainment, a cultural pavilion highlighting the contributions of the Italians of San Diego, vendors, and Sicilian cuisine.

In May and again in November, there is the Taste of Little Italy (Spring), where attendees pay to sample food from over 20 participating restaurants and entertainment throughout the community. Proceeds from this event go to the Little Italy Association.

In September, there is the Labor Day Stickball Tournament, where several stickball leagues come to play on the streets of Little Italy. This time honored east coast game is played like baseball, but with some minor tweaks. Every third year the San Diego leagues host a West Coast Invitational where they invite New York and Puerto Rico to play on the streets of San Diego's Little Italy.

In October, there is the Little Italy Festa, the largest Italian festival outside of New York City, with over 150 Italian food and crafter booths, three stages of entertainment, the Gesso Italiano Street Painting Festival, a stickball exhibition game, bocce ball tournament and beer & wine gardens. Also in October, there is the Bulls of St. Agata Charge Little Italy; this event showcases over 50 Lamborghinis from all over the United States.

In December, there is the Little Italy Christmas Village and Tree Lighting. This event has progressively gotten larger and larger, with Santa Claus riding in on Little Italy Fire Engine #3 kicking off the festivities of music, shopping and bubbly snow flakes for the kids.
