= 5th Avenue station =

5th Avenue station or Fifth Avenue station may refer to:

- 5th Avenue station (PNR), a railway station in Caloocan, Metro Manila, Philippines
- 5th Avenue station (LRT), a light metro station in Caloocan, Metro Manila, Philippines
- Fifth Avenue–59th Street station, a subway station in Manhattan, New York, United States
- 5th Avenue (IRT Flushing Line), a subway station in Manhattan, New York, United States
- Fifth Avenue/53rd Street station, a subway station in Manhattan, New York, United States
- Mall/Southwest 5th Avenue station, a light rail station in Portland, Oregon, United States
- Pioneer Place/Southwest 5th station, a light rail station in Portland, Oregon, United States
- Fifth Avenue station (San Diego), a trolley stop in San Diego, California, United States
- Fifth/Lake station, a former "L" station in Chicago, Illinois, United States

== See also ==
- 5th Street station (disambiguation)
