= 5th Street =

5th Street or Fifth Street may refer to:

== Roads and bridges ==
- 5th Street (Manhattan), an east–west street in Lower Manhattan
- 5th Street (North Las Vegas), a north–south street in North Las Vegas
- 5th Street (Philadelphia), one of the boundaries of Independence Mall
- 5th Street (St. Louis), officially known as Broadway
- 5th Street (Washington, D.C.)
- Fifth Street Viaduct, officially the Curtis Holt Sr. Bridge, in Richmond, Virginia

== Places ==
- 5th Street Gym, a boxing gym in Miami Beach, Florida
- Fifth Street, Texas, a community in United States
- Fifth Street Bluff Historic District, a national historic district in Ottumwa, Iowa
- Fifth Street Historic District, a national historic district in Lynchburg, Virginia
- Fifth Street Towers, a two-building complex in Minneapolis, Minnesota
- East Fifth Street Historic District (East Liverpool, Ohio), a national historic district

== Other ==
- Fifth street, the final card dealt in a poker hand
- Fifth Street Asset Management, an American asset management company

== See also ==
- 5th Street station (disambiguation), train stations with this name
- Fifth Street Bridge (disambiguation)
- Fifth Avenue (disambiguation)
