= Curtis Holt =

Curtis Holt may refer to:

- Curtis Holt (Arrowverse), a character in the Arrow television series based on the character Mister Terrific.
- Curtis J. Holt Sr., a civil rights and public housing activist from Richmond, Virginia.
- Fifth Street Viaduct, officially known as the Curtis Holt Sr. Bridge
