= Murder of Cissy Stuart =

1989 unsolved murder by stabbing

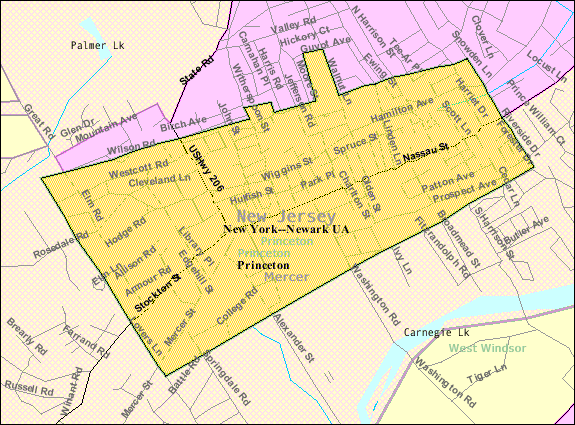
- Historical Borough of Princeton, New Jersey; Stuart's house is near the center of the map.

- Location: 40.3470°N 74.6644°W; 34 Mercer Street; Princeton, New Jersey
- Date: April 2, 1989 between 5:00 and 7:00 p.m. (EDT)
- Attack type: Stabbing (homicide)
- Weapon: 2-inch (5.1 cm) knife
- Deaths: 1 (Cissy Stuart)
- Coroner: Raafat Ahmad

On April 2, 1989, 74-year-old American newspaper owner Emily "Cissy" Stuart was stabbed to death in her home in the borough of Princeton, New Jersey. Her fully clothed body was discovered two days later in her locked basement with no signs of a struggle, and nothing was missing from the house. The Mercer County medical examiner found five stab wounds on her back. The murder weapon was never recovered, a motive for the killing has never been determined and no perpetrator was ever identified. As of January 2025, the murder remained unsolved. The case was the subject of a documentary directed by her son Charles Stuart called My Mother's Murder (1992), which aired on the HBO documentary series America Undercover.

== Background ==
Emily "Cissy" Stuart was born Emily K. Cowenhoven in New Brunswick to Emily and Charles Tiebout Cowenhoven Jr., a lawyer. She was descended from Wolfert Gerritse van Couwenhoven—one of the first pioneers of New Netherland and the founder of New Amersfoort (present-day Flatlands, Brooklyn, New York)—and Nicasius de Sille, a founder of New Utrecht who served as First Councillor and schout-fiscal to Peter Stuyvesant. She moved with her family to the borough of Princeton, New Jersey when she was 11, later attending Rosemary Hall in Greenwich, Connecticut, Miss Fine's School in Princeton, and Bryn Mawr College before graduating from Wellesley College in 1937. She soon went to work at the Princeton Herald, where her future husband, Princeton University graduate Donald C. Stuart Jr., was editor-in-chief. The couple married in 1939. In 1946, they founded Town Topics, their own local weekly newspaper, together with Mary and Dan Coyle, Stuart's sister and brother-in-law. In 1953 the couple moved into a white Victorian house at 34 Mercer Street. They had two sons—Donald C. "Jeb" III and Charles, a television producer for ABC News—and four grandchildren. The couple divorced in 1968, and Stuart's ex-husband remarried. He died of cancer in 1981, after which time Jeb took over as editor-in-chief of Town Topics. Jeb's wife Sheila managed the business side of the newspaper.

One of her town's most well-known residents, Stuart was a feisty and opinionated woman who did not hesitate to speak her mind. Described by a neighbor as being anything but "a little old lady", Stuart would debate controversial topics such as feminism, all while peppering her conversation with four-letter words including damn and hell. She was known to invite into her home door-to-door solicitors who offered religious books, if only for the opportunity to present the counternarrative. Despite the fact that she had an old money background, Stuart was in the habit of doing her own household chores such as splitting firewood, shoveling snow, and repairing things around the house.

Even while she still worked at the family newspaper, Stuart was involved in other activities around town. She participated in local theater, taking on roles with the Princeton Community Players group including Mary Poppins and the wicked witch, and delighted passersby in front of her house on Halloween by wearing her witch hat while raking leaves. A longtime member of the Stony Brook Garden Club of Princeton, Stuart devotedly tended to the roses, monkshoods and daffodils she grew in her yard (referring to the latter as her "Mr. Einsteins"; the famous physicist used to live down the street). She was fond of sprinkling California poppy seeds around town where she thought some color was needed, and would even trim trees in the public domain and pick up litter as she came across it on her regular walks around town.

== Murder ==
Stuart began her final day of Sunday, April 2, 1989 by attending services at Trinity Church, which was right across the street from her house. At 9:00 a.m. she had breakfast in her home with her sister, Margaretta Cowenhoven. A little over an hour later, Stuart announced that she was going to do some gardening, at which point her sister left the house. At half past noon, Stuart's friend Doris Mellinger dropped by. Stuart often drank alcoholic beverages such as beer and bourbon with her guests; on this occasion, the two enjoyed Bloody Marys. Mellinger left the house at 1:15 p.m. Police initially assumed that Mellinger was the last person to see Stuart alive; but at around 4:30 p.m. (or not long thereafter) Stuart was outside gardening again when she saw Elias "Bloxy" Baker—a local businessowner—driving by on the way to his lumberyard, and she waved to him.

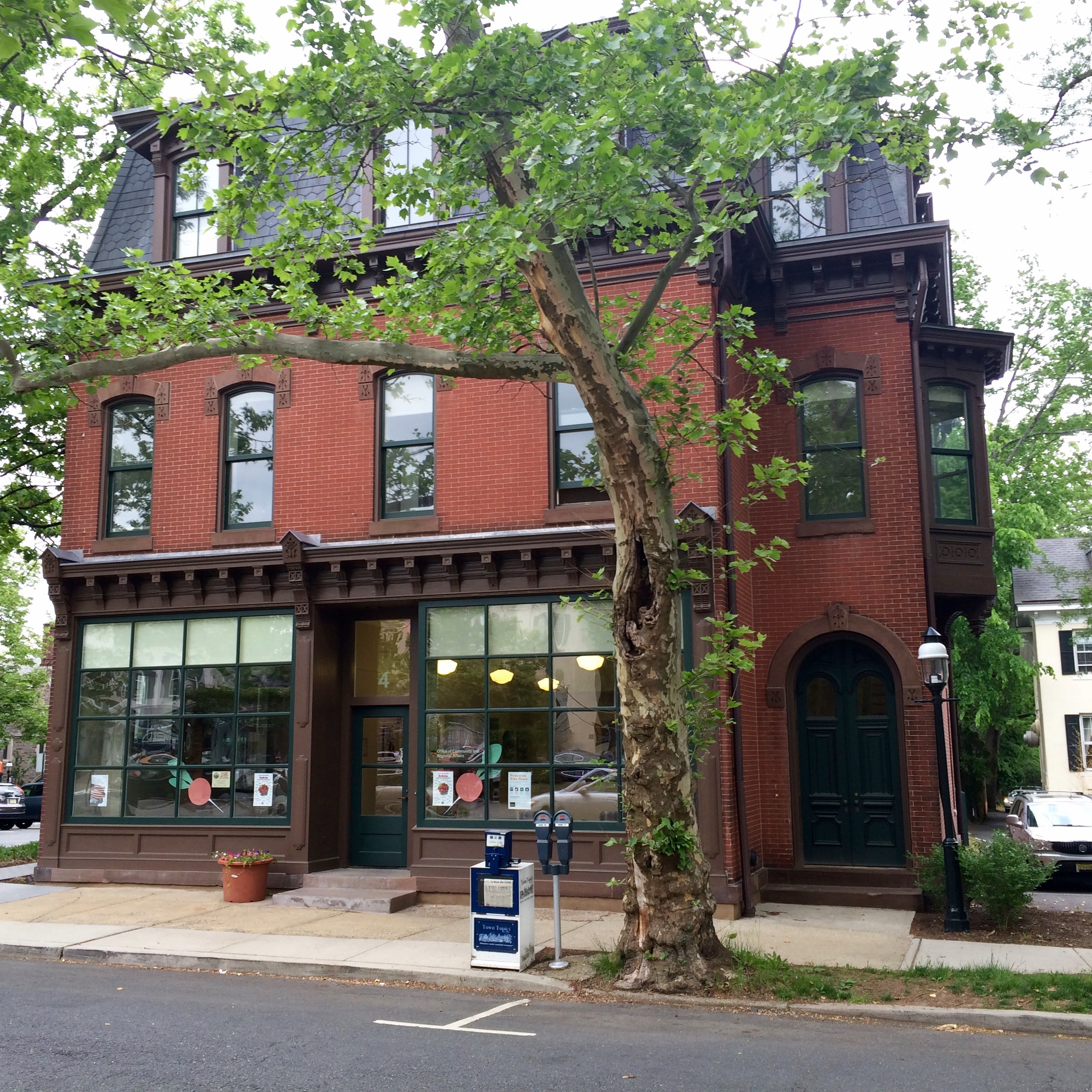
The Town Topics office building at 4 Mercer Street, where Jeb and Sheila Stuart worked at the time, was only a two-minute walk from the murder scene.

Jeb Stuart spent the day with his family at their Bay Head beach house. Later, he drove with his daughter Laurie to the Town Topics parking lot in Princeton, arriving there at 6:00 p.m.; they went there to retrieve a car and set of keys that his son Craig, a Princeton University student, had borrowed. They left the parking lot ten minutes later after Laurie could not locate Craig in his nearby dormitory, and they arrived home in Hopewell Township at 6:30 p.m. Meanwhile, Sheila and her mother—who had driven to Bay Head in a separate vehicle—left there at 5:30 p.m. to do some window shopping, before returning home to Hopewell at dusk.

At 1:20 p.m. the next day, Jeb made the two-minute walk from the Town Topics offices at 4 Mercer Street to his mother's house for his daily lunch with her, which she usually prepared for him. He used his own key to enter through the front door, walked into the kitchen, and noticed that the side door leading to a back porch was ajar, the storm door in the door frame was left unlocked, (Note: According to another source, the storm door was locked.) and her copy of The New York Times was thrown down on the porch; his mother was nowhere to be seen. Jeb found all of this to be incongruous, but reasoned that on occasion she was known to leave the door unlocked on her way out. After checking upstairs, he next unlocked the interior hallway door which led down to the basement, opened the light and called out to his mother, with no response. After not finding her in the yard, Jeb noticed that the padlock on the black wooden door on the left side of the house—which provided access from the yard to the basement—was also locked. He thought this was odd, since his mother normally left that door unlocked in order to allow herself easy access to her gardening tools in the basement; she would usually simply slip the shackle into the latch and turn the lock body to make the door appear to be locked, but without actually clicking the lock shut. Jeb later told investigators that having found the basement locked from both sides, he became convinced that no further checking in that space was necessary; on other occasions, he said he had a feeling that day that his mother might be in the basement, that something might have happened to her—such as a medical emergency—and that he could not bring himself to descend to the bottom of the staircase:

Your first thought is, 'Gee, maybe she had a heart attack'. That's the first thing that goes through your mind with somebody that age. At that point you're not thinking somebody murdered your mother. This is Princeton, not some high-crime area.

After making himself a sandwich and eating it, Jeb locked the side door behind him and went back to work. At 3:30 p.m., Sheila entered the house using her husband's key in order to attempt a search for Stuart; she also returned to the office soon after. The couple returned again to the house at 6:30 p.m. This time, Sheila found Stuart's coat in the living room. Stuart's purse was found on the floor, which appeared to be intact and not disturbed in any way. After making a few calls to acquaintances, all they managed to learn about was Cowenhoven's Sunday breakfast meeting with Stuart. Upon speaking with Doris Mellinger, the latter suggested they check the basement; they declined, on account of Jeb having found it locked. Jeb called the hospital and the police to ask if they heard anything from his mother, but they had not. The latter offered to send over a patrol car, which he refused, and the couple returned home to Hopewell Township after leaving the light on for Stuart. Sheila returned to the house at 9:00 p.m. to check the property, and Jeb continued to call the house until 1:30 a.m.

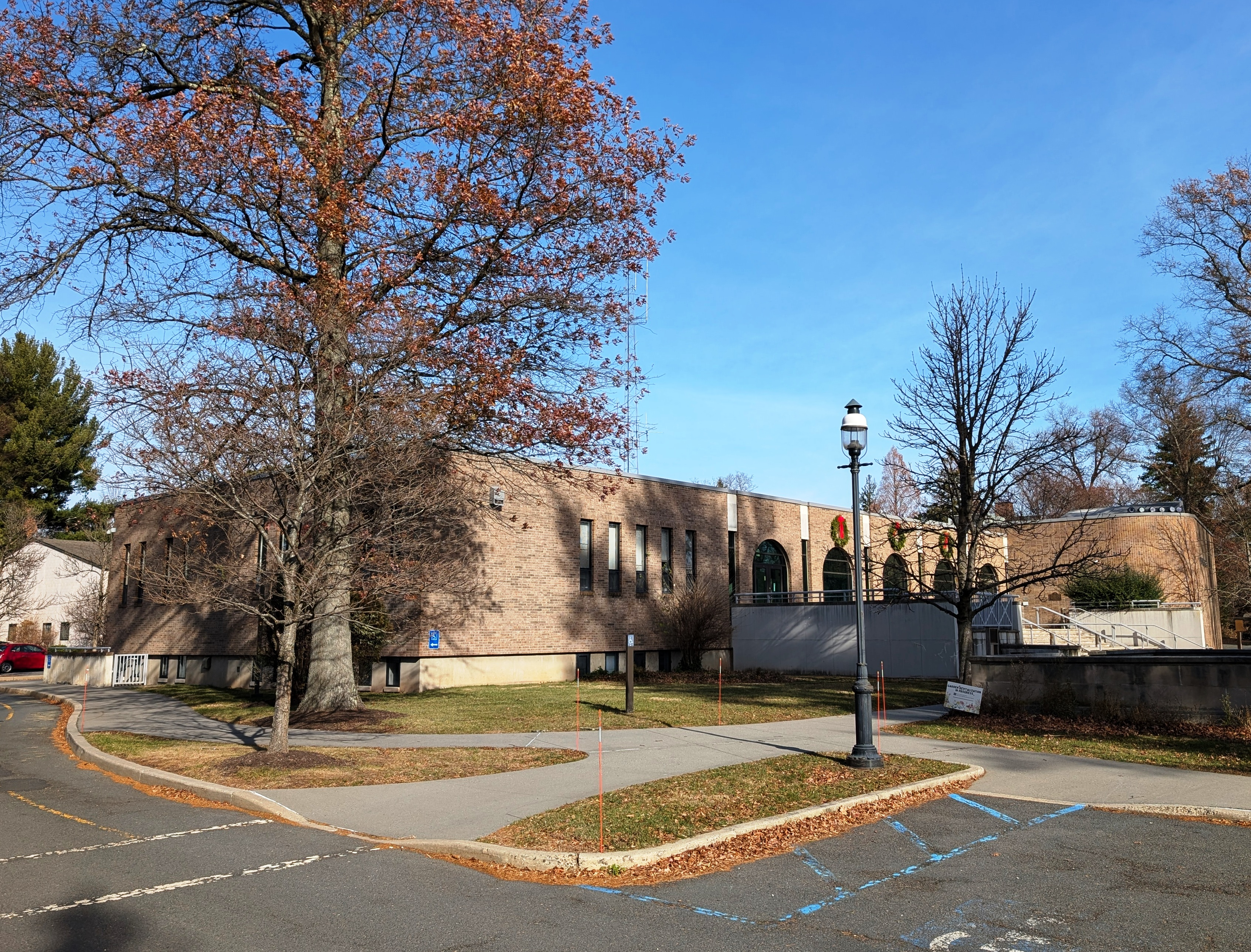
Former borough hall and police headquarters for the Borough of Princeton, where Jeb and Sheila reported Stuart missing.

Stuart's maid arrived as usual on Tuesday morning a little after 9:00 a.m. for her weekly house cleaning chores. The maid found that Cowenhoven, Jeb and Sheila had arrived at the house a half hour earlier. The family informed the maid that although Stuart was missing, she should proceed to do her chores as usual, and then Jeb walked over to the office. Sheila had noticed that Stuart's calendar had an entry indicating a doctor's appointment at 10:30 a.m., so she called the doctor's office requesting a confirmation call to the house if Stuart were to appear. At the appointed time, the doctor called to say that Stuart neglected to arrive. As such, Sheila walked over to the Town Topics offices to inform Jeb. Together, they walked over to the Princeton Police Department to officially report Stuart missing. They arrived there at 10:38 a.m., where they met with police sergeant Anthony V. Federico. In the meantime, Cowenhoven and the maid decided to do their own search of the house. Although Jeb had discouraged them from doing so, at 10:50 a.m. they unlocked the hallway door which led down to the basement using the skeleton key which was still in the keyhole. Utilizing what she later described as "nerves of steel", Cowenhoven (Note: According to one source, the body was discovered by Stuart's other sister—Mary Coyle—and the maid.) descended the wooden staircase, where they saw Stuart's body lying on the basement floor at the bottom of the stairs, and—too frightened to approach the body themselves—they called the police. At that moment, Jeb and Sheila were standing with Federico in the lobby at police headquarters. Upon hearing the news, they got in a police car; in one minute they were at the house, where Federico found the victim on the basement floor. She was lying face down slightly on her right side with her arms beneath her chest and her eyeglasses still clutched firmly in her right hand. She was found fully dressed in her gardening clothes, which consisted of a beige cardigan sweater on top of another sweater, Lee jeans and blue plimsolls. There was blood on her back, and her Seiko watch—which showed the correct time—was still on her left wrist. No weapons were found, and Stuart's gardening tools were still well organized in their proper places.

== Aftermath ==
Stuart was buried in nearby Rocky Hill. In the interest of security, sometime after the murder Stuart's sons added a third access door to the basement in an unobtrusive spot under the porch, and the black side door was permanently locked. There was a puddle of water where Stuart's body was found, the origin of which her son Charles could not explain. He lamented the fact that pedestrians used the property's driveway and the alley behind the houses as a shortcut to the adjacent Alexander Street and Princeton University Store at University Place. The house was sold to Opus Dei—a Catholic lay organization—six months after the murder, and it has since been known as Mercer House.

== Investigation ==
In the immediate aftermath of the discovery of the body, Princeton police chief Michael Carnevale assigned all five of his detectives to work the case. Stuart was found lying on top of an outstretched electrical wire connected to an overhead porcelain light fixture, and this initially led detectives to believe that she had been electrocuted. But after the body was examined in the basement by Mercer County medical examiner Raafat Ahmad, it was determined that Stuart had been stabbed to death, and that this had occurred on April 2 sometime between 5:00 and 7:00 p.m., the latter time corresponding to sunset. It was found that one of the stab wounds had severed her spinal cord, with substantial internal bleeding sealing her fate. Jeb was standing in the kitchen with a police captain when they heard another officer's voice calling up from the basement, announcing that Stuart's death was apparently a homicide; at that, Jeb exclaimed "Well, of course it is!"

Although the stabbing took place during daylight hours on a Sunday across the street from a church, there were no witnesses to the crime. Around the time of the murder, a neighbor and her children rode their bicycles back and forth almost a dozen times in front of Stuart's house, but no one heard or saw anything.

Town Topics speculated—without offering evidence—that Stuart was attacked "in a walkway area under the back porch" and then taken to the basement; but the Mercer County prosecutor, Paul T. Koenig Jr., said "It appears Mrs. Stuart was killed where she was found". He added that five stab wounds—made by a knife just over 2 inches (5 cm) long, possibly a pocket knife—were found on her back between the shoulder blades. Investigators determined that there was no clear sign of a struggle, which pointed to the possibility that Stuart was familiar with her killer, as she might have felt comfortable turning her back to the perpetrator. She was also hard of hearing, which led a friend to speculate that Stuart did not hear her attacker approaching from behind. The stab wounds being almost horizontal indicated that the killer may have been standing by her side. Police and others have stated that the basement door having been padlocked suggested that the killer must have been familiar with Stuart and her house. Crime scene investigators were able to retrieve fingerprints using an argon laser and fluorescent technology, but the perpetrator was careful to avoid leaving fingerprints on the lock.

The day after the discovery of the body, police did a walk-through of the house with Jeb and others to see if they noticed anything amiss. Everything was found to be in order, and even Stuart's wallet—which contained $3.42—lay undisturbed on the kitchen table, along with the keys to her blue 1965 Chevrolet Malibu and another pair of eyeglasses. Thirteen weeks later, the police still had no motive, and no suspects had been arrested.

Later that same year, a spate of knife-related assaults in Princeton led to the conviction and sentencing of Gerald Geffrard, a 22-year-old Haitian man, to 20 years' imprisonment. The police did not reveal at the time whether or not they considered Geffrard to be a possible suspect in the Stuart case; however, his involvement has since been ruled out. The following year, Princeton Police Department Captain Thomas Michaud (Note: His correct name; given name reported erroneously in The Boston Globe as 'Edward'.) was sent to Pittsburgh to discuss the case with a psychic in the hopes that this would lead to a breakthrough. In June of that year, Jeb refused a polygraph test. He refused again a few years later on the advice of his lawyer. In 1991, the department enlisted the help of Avinoam Sapir of Phoenix—the inventor of a controversial technique known as scientific content analysis (SCAN)—to obtain his analysis of police interviews. None of these efforts proved beneficial in solving the case. The following year, Michaud—by then chief of police—said that the department had a long list of possible suspects, which included family members and neighbors, and that names on the list were slowly being eliminated. Geffrard died in prison in 2004, and Jeb died of prostate cancer in 2008 at the age of 66.

Stuart's murder was one of only three similar crimes which occurred in Princeton during the 22 years prior; as of January 2025, it was still the last one recorded in town since then. Jeb and Charles had initially offered $25,000 for any information leading to the identity of the perpetrators, which they later raised to $50,000. However, no one came forward with any information; this surprised Koenig and a detective in the prosecutor's office in light of the large sum proffered. Chief Carnevale thought this was to be expected, since the murder did not appear to have been carried out by a criminal element prone to snitching. The police returned the reward money to the family in 1991. Federico eventually rose in rank to become police chief, and he transferred the case over to Nick Sutter, a detective. In 2003, the former enlisted the help of the Federal Bureau of Investigation through their office in Trenton and their Violent Crimes Task Force. The bureau assigned an agent to the case—John Mulligan—who at the time was also the lead investigator examining the murder of Daniel Pearl, a reporter for The Wall Street Journal who was beheaded in Pakistan. Federico died in 2009 and Sutter was elevated to chief, and in 2019 the latter transferred the case over to Darwin "Bill" Kieffer, a detective. As of January 2025 (35 years after the murder), a weapon had still not been retrieved, a motive for the crime had not been found, and suspects in the case had yet to be identified and apprehended.

== Reactions ==
Gloria Emerson, a journalist for The New York Times and neighbor of Cissy Stuart who was interviewed for a documentary film about the crime, noted that many of Stuart's neighbors refused to talk about the murder, while others placed the blame with members of the family.

== In popular culture ==
Charles Stuart directed a documentary about the case called My Mother's Murder (1992) which aired on the HBO documentary series America Undercover. An eight-episode podcast series about the murder entitled In the Shadow of Princeton (2024), hosted by Kevin Shea and Rebecca Everett, was promulgated by NJ.com and The Star-Ledger.

== See also ==
- List of unsolved murders (1980–1999)
