= Nassau Electric Railroad =

Streetcar company in New York

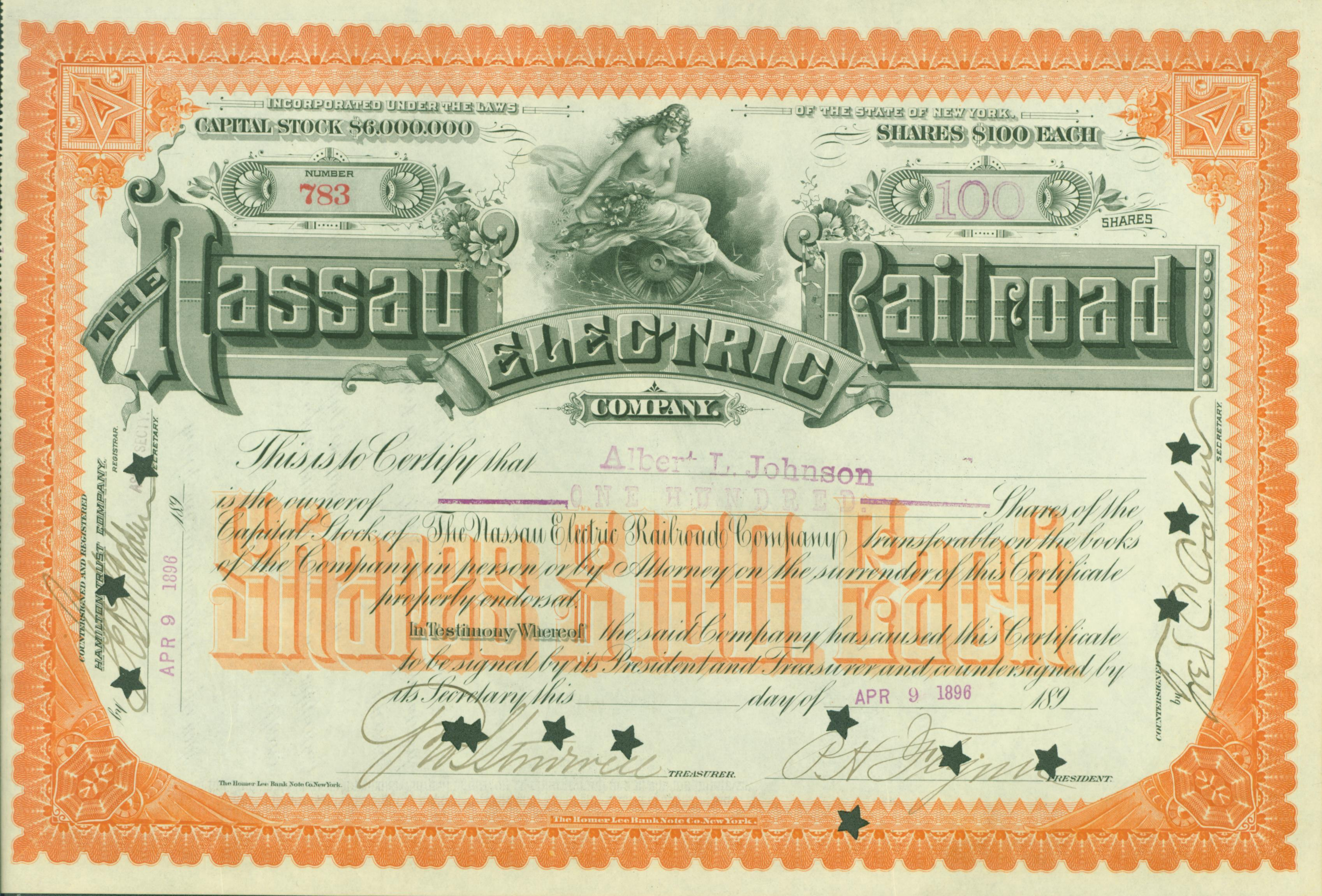
Share of the Nassau Electric Railroad Company, issued 9. April 1896

The Nassau Electric Railroad was an electric street railway company in the U.S. state of New York. The company operated throughout the borough of Brooklyn, as well as over the Brooklyn Bridge and Williamsburg Bridge into Manhattan.

== History ==
The company was formed by real estate developer Patrick H. Flynn, who owned land on Fifth Avenue south of 25th Street, where the Atlantic Avenue Railroad's Fifth Avenue Line ended. He went to the Atlantic Avenue Railroad and Brooklyn City Rail Road, asking them to extend their lines to serve the area, but the Atlantic Avenue refused because the area was not built up, and the Brooklyn City refused because they had agreed to leave Fifth Avenue to the Atlantic Avenue. Faced with the lack of a railroad connection to his planned subdivision, Flynn incorporated the Coney Island, Fort Hamilton and Brooklyn Railroad, the Union Railroad, the Kings County Electric Railway, and finally the Nassau Electric Railroad to absorb them all.

The CIFH&B was chartered by the New York State Legislature on June 7, 1890, to build from the 39th Street Ferry through New Utrecht to Coney Island and Fort Hamilton. Soon the Atlantic Avenue was also interested in extending its Fifth Avenue Line through Flynn's land to 36th Street, which it had a franchise to build to. In 1892, Flynn took over the Union Railroad, which had been chartered on May 6, 1884, and incorporated June 19 by other parties to connect Hamilton Ferry with Prospect Park along Union Street. Flynn's plan was to build the Union Street Line and a connection along Second Avenue to the CIFH&B, allowing the RIFH&B to reach Hamilton Ferry. Flynn also planned to extend the Union Street Line east via East New York to City Line. The Kings County Electric Railway was incorporated by Flynn on November 29, 1892, to build a crosstown line from the 39th Street Ferry east along Church Avenue and New Lots Avenue to City Line, and to build from Canarsie Landing north to the city line on the west side of the Cemetery of the Evergreens, crossing the east–west line at Brownsville and the Union Street Line extension at East New York.

Flynn then incorporated the Nassau Electric Railroad on March 13, 1893, in order to raise more capital for the system and with the right to use the tracks of the other three companies. In the next few years, most of the system's franchised lines, totalling about 100 miles (160 km), were built:

- Fifth Avenue Line, Sunset Park to Fort Hamilton
- 86th Street Line, Bay Ridge to Bath Beach (connecting there with the Brooklyn, Bath and West End Railroad (West End Line) to Coney Island)
- Marcy Avenue Line and Ocean Avenue Line, Williamsburg to Sheepshead Bay
- Wilson Avenue Line and Rockaway Parkway Line, Williamsburg to Canarsie Landing
- St. Johns Place Line and Liberty Avenue Line, Crown Heights to City Line
- Church Avenue Line and New Lots Avenue Line, 39th Street Ferry (Sunset Park) to New Lots

Flynn incorporated the East River and Atlantic Ocean Railroad on November 16, 1895, to gain access to the Brooklyn Bridge, Long Island City, and other places. However, the Nassau leased the Atlantic Avenue Railroad on April 4, 1896, thus gaining Fifth Avenue and other streets north to the bridge, a lease on the Brooklyn, Bath and West End Railroad (West End Line), and several other lines, and the ER&A was no longer necessary.

The Canarsie Depot, at the intersection of Hegeman Avenue (Church Avenue and New Lots Avenue Lines) and Rockaway Avenue (Wilson Avenue Line), stored cars. The depot existed from 1895 to 1951 and is now the site of the Butcher houses.
