= Fifth Avenue Line =

Fifth Avenue Line may refer to one of the following transit lines in New York City, US:

- Fifth Avenue Line (Brooklyn elevated) (former rapid transit)
- Madison and Fifth Avenue buses (bus)
- Fifth Avenue Line (Brooklyn surface) (bus, formerly streetcar)
