= 86th Street Line =

86th Street Line may refer to the following:

- 86th Street Line (Brooklyn)
- M86 (New York City bus), the 86th Street Crosstown Line
- B1 (New York City bus), the 86th Street/Brighton Beach Avenue Line
