= Fifth Avenue Place =

Fifth Avenue Place can refer to either:

- Fifth Avenue Place (Calgary), a skyscraper in Calgary, Canada
- Fifth Avenue Place (Pittsburgh) (also known as Highmark Place), a skyscraper in Pittsburgh, Pennsylvania

== See also ==
- Fifth Avenue (disambiguation)
