= Fifth Street Bridge =

Fifth Street Bridge can refer to any several bridges in the United States:

- Fifth Street Bridge (Richmond, Virginia), also called the Fifth Street Viaduct
- Southwest Fifth St. Bridge in Des Moines, Iowa
- West Fifth Street Bridge, also called the Ashtabula lift bridge, in Ashtabula, Ohio
- Arthur J. DiTommaso Memorial Bridge
