= West End Line =

West End Line may refer to:

- BMT West End Line, a line of the New York City Subway
- Victoria line, a line of the London Underground that had this name during planning
- West End Line (Brooklyn surface), a former surface transit line in Brooklyn, New York City
