= Fort Hamilton Line =

The following transit lines in Brooklyn, New York City, United States have been known as the Fort Hamilton Line:

- Fort Hamilton Line (Second Avenue), no longer a route
- Fort Hamilton Line (Third Avenue), no longer a route
- Fort Hamilton Line (Fifth Avenue), now the B63 bus route

The BMT Fourth Avenue Line subway also runs to Fort Hamilton.
