= Highland Park (Richmond) =

Neighborhood of Richmond, Virginia

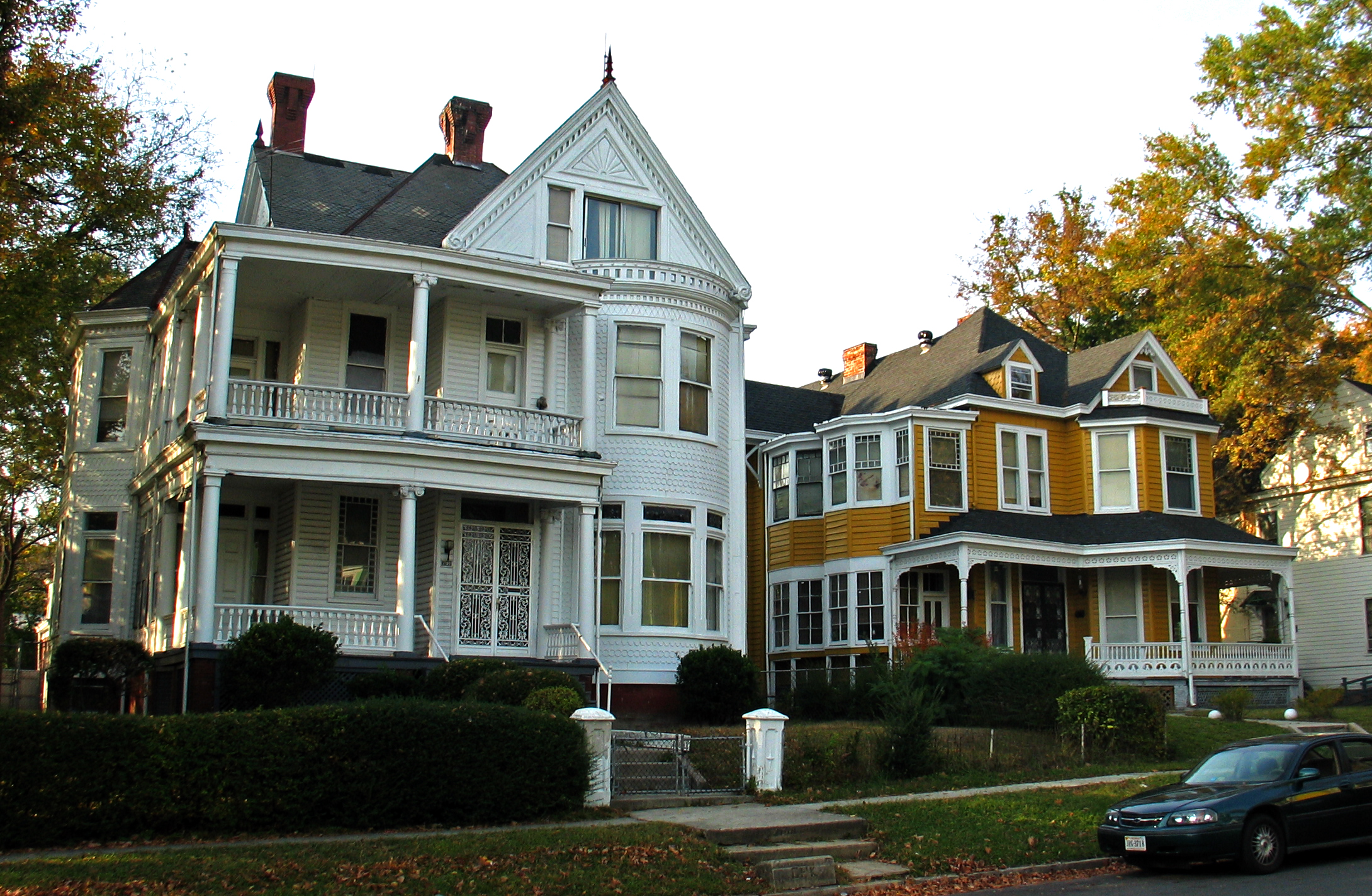
View north on 3rd Avenue near Cypress Street

Highland Park is a neighborhood comprising several historic districts north of downtown Richmond, Virginia. Over time, various boundaries have served to split the neighborhood into sections traditionally labeled East Highland Park, North Highland Park (Highland Park Plaza), and South Highland Park (Chestnut Hill/Plateau). The southern Highland Park boundaries are roughly First Avenue to the west, Fifth Avenue to the east, the Shockoe Valley to the south, and E. Brookland Park Boulevard to the north. The Highland Park Southern Tip neighborhood is also known as the Chestnut Hill-Plateau Historic District. The Highland Park Plaza/Northern Highland Park boundaries are roughly defined by Pensacola ave and the railroad tracks to the north, Fifth avenue to the east, E. Brookland Park boulevard to the south, and Meadowbridge Road (the Richmond-Henrico Turnpike) to the west. The zip code is 23222.

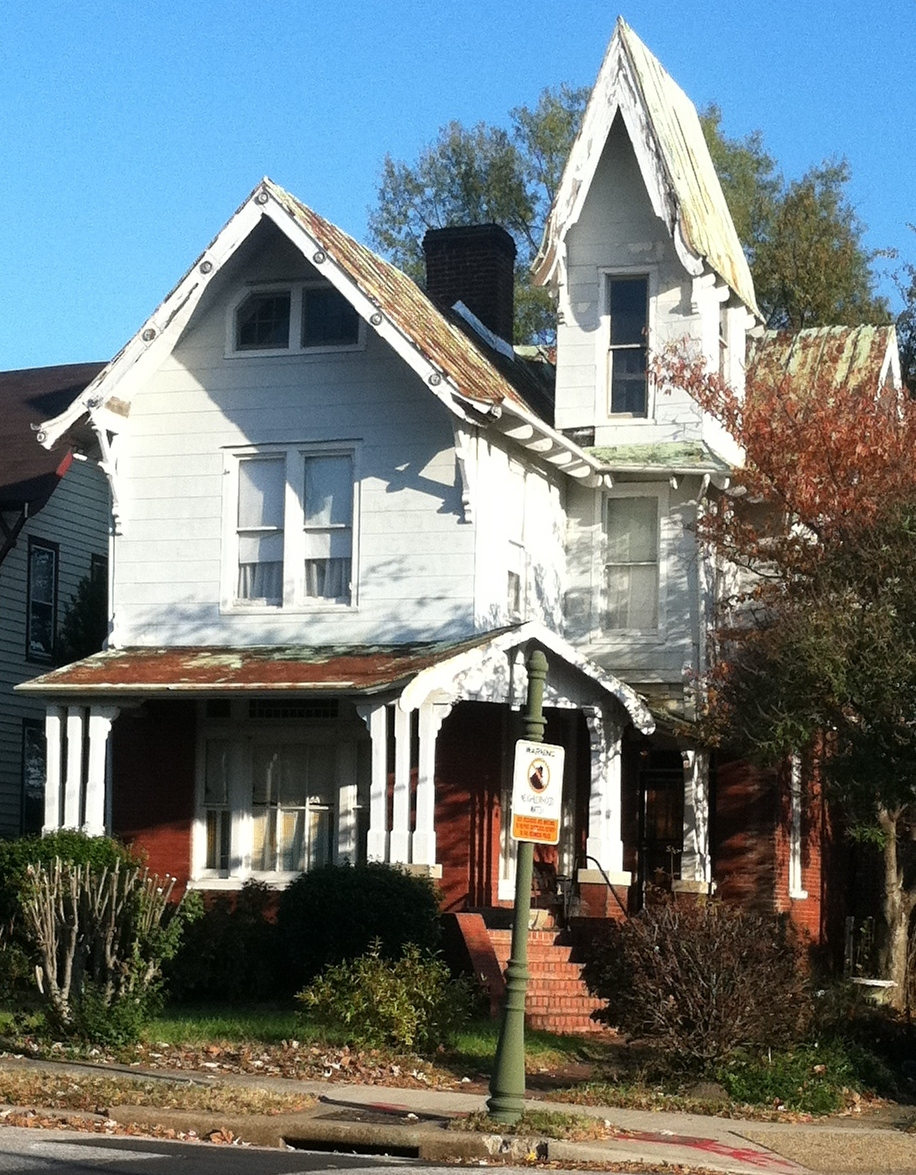
House in Chestnut Hill-Plateau historic district

Largely residential in character, the area is notable for having Richmond's largest remaining stock of Queen Anne style homes. Originally developed as a streetcar suburb starting in 1891, the community quickly became a magnet for the city's burgeoning southern & eastern European immigrant population, particularly Italians, Germans, and Poles. The Highland Park Plaza Historic District was added to the National Register of Historic Places in 2004.

The area declined after World War II, when white flight and other economic factors encouraged wealthy and middle-class residents to depart for newer neighborhoods in the city's West End. Southern Highland Park is currently seeing a resurgence of activity thanks to its location convenient to downtown and the Virginia BioTechnology Research Park. The city's "Neighborhoods in Bloom" program, a public-private partnership focused on encouraging investment activity in targeted areas, has also contributed to this resurgence.

== Natives ==
- Linwood, James, and Anthony Briley, three brothers who gained infamy for a seven-month spree in the Greater Richmond Region during which they robbed, tortured, and killed at least 11 people (and attempted to burn two others to death), were raised in Highland Park. Linwood and James were executed in 1985.
