= Civic Center station (San Diego Trolley) =

San Diego Trolley station

Civic Center
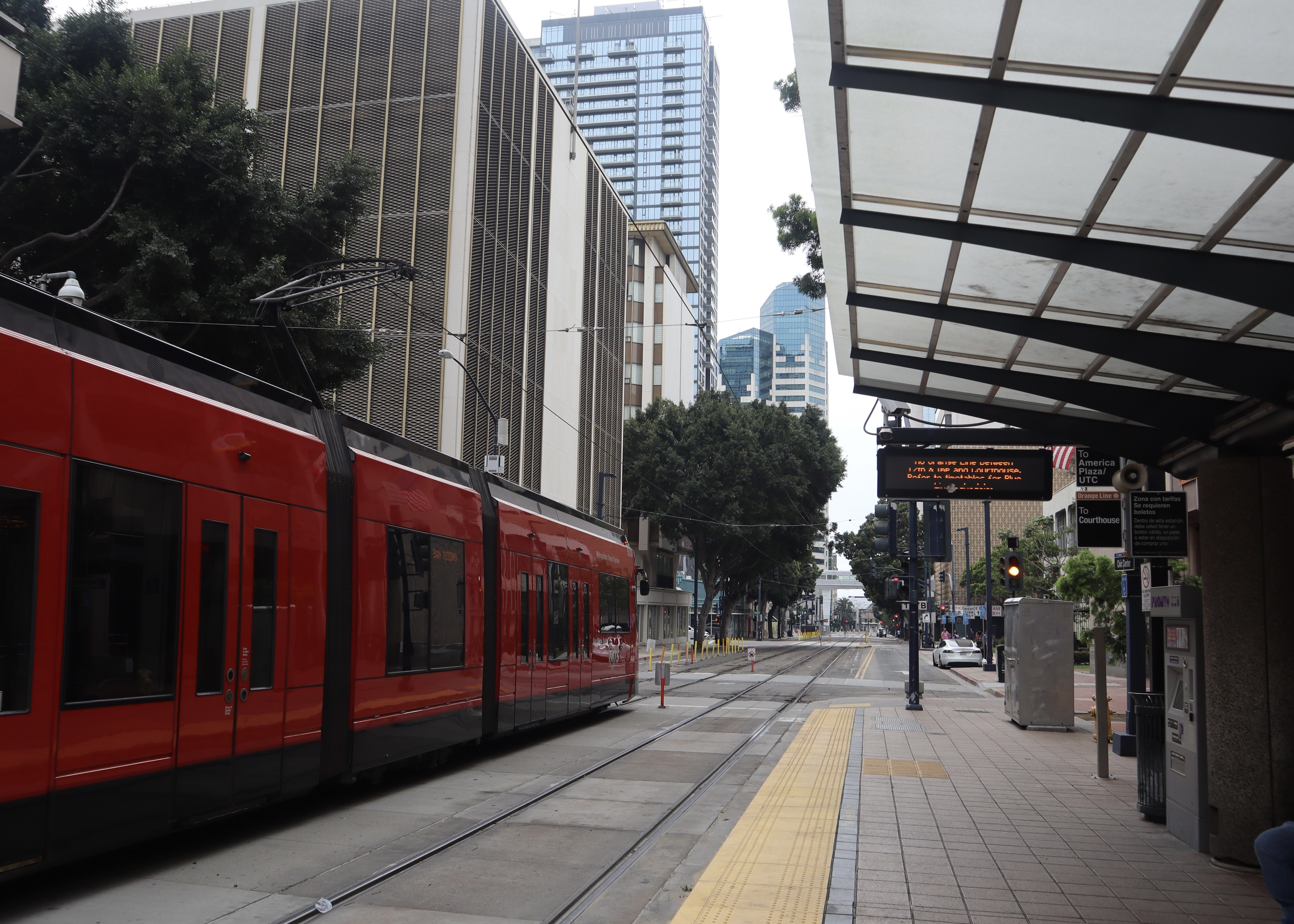
- Civic Center station, 2024

General information
- Location: 200 C Street; San Diego, California; United States
- Coordinates: 32°43′00″N 117°09′46″W
- Owner: San Diego Metropolitan Transit System
- Operator: San Diego Trolley
- Platforms: 2 side platforms
- Tracks: 2

Construction
- Structure type: At-grade
- Accessible: Disabled access

Other information
- Station code: 75086, 75087

History
- Opened: July 26, 1981
- Rebuilt: 2012

Services
Preceding station	San Diego Trolley	Following station
America Plaza toward UTC	Blue Line	Fifth Avenue toward San Ysidro
Courthouse Terminus	Orange Line	Fifth Avenue toward El Cajon
America Plaza Terminus	Orange Line Late nights only	Fifth Avenue toward El Cajon
America Plaza One-way operation	Silver Line	Fifth Avenue Next clockwise
Former services
Preceding station	San Diego Trolley	Following station
America Plaza Terminus	Orange Line 2017-2018	Fifth Avenue toward El Cajon
America Plaza toward Santa Fe Depot	Orange Line 2012-2017	Fifth Avenue toward El Cajon
America Plaza toward 12th & Imperial	Orange Line 2005-2012	Fifth Avenue toward Gillespie Field
Location

Civic Center station is a station of the Blue, Orange, and Silver Lines on the San Diego Trolley. It is located in the downtown Core of the city along C Street between Second and Third Avenues.

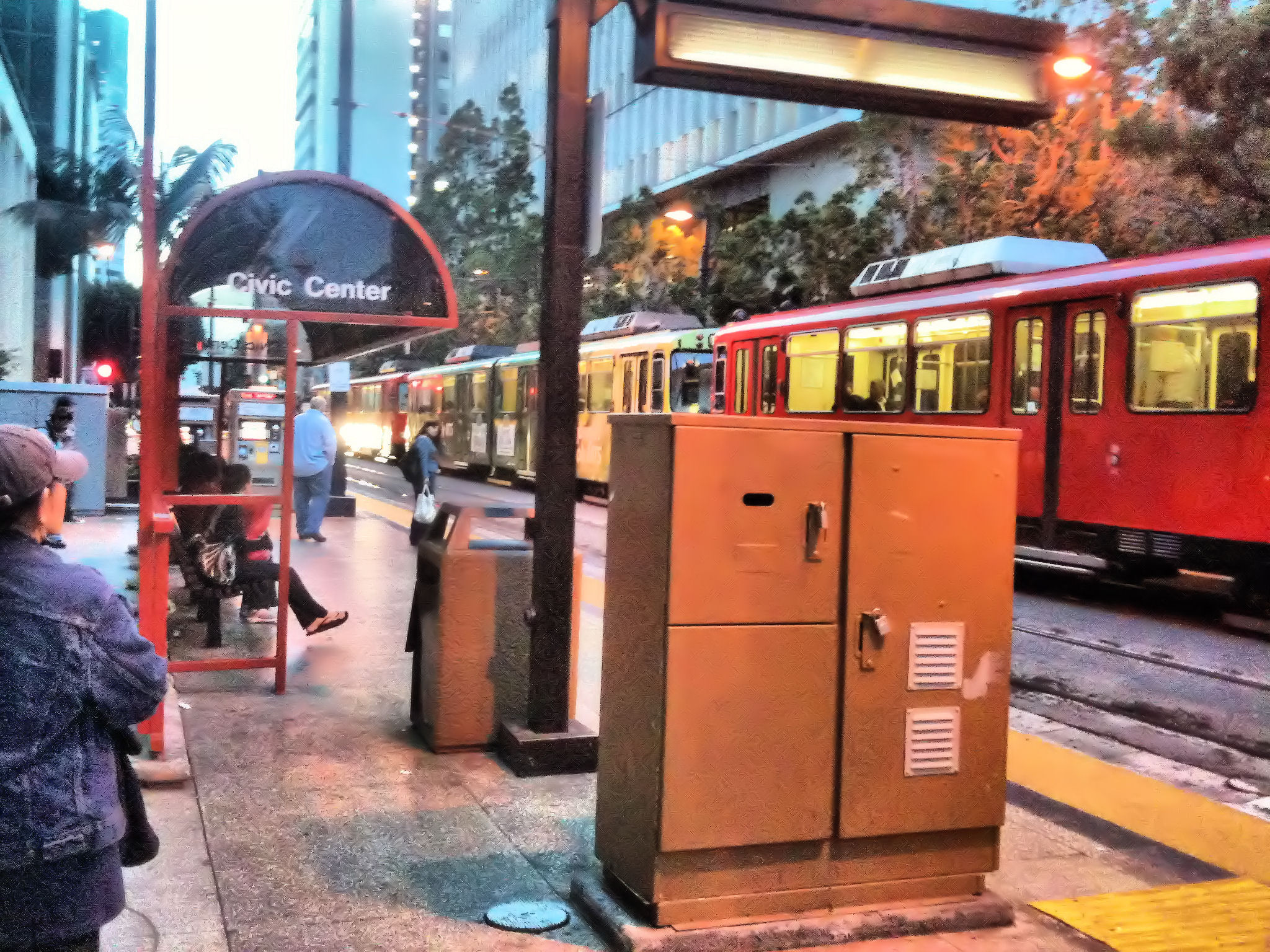
Civic Center Station before Trolley Renewal

This station was closed from May 14 through August 2012 due to renovations related to the Trolley Renewal Project.
