= Fifth Avenue (disambiguation) =

Fifth Avenue is a major thoroughfare in Manhattan, New York City.

Fifth Avenue or 5 Av may also refer to:

== Streets ==
- Fifth Avenue (Brooklyn), New York City
- Fifth Avenue (Pittsburgh), Pennsylvania
- Fifth Avenue or Quinta Avenida, a boulevard in Miramar, Havana, Cuba
- 5th Avenue, Caloocan and Quezon City, Philippines

== Structures ==
- Fifth Avenue Place (Calgary), a skyscraper on 5th Avenue in Calgary, Alberta, Canada
- Fifth Avenue Place (Pittsburgh), a skyscraper on 5th Avenue in Pittsburgh, Pennsylvania
- Anchorage 5th Avenue Mall, Anchorage, Alaska

== Transit ==
=== United States ===
- Several New York City Subway stations in Manhattan:
  - Fifth Avenue–59th Street (BMT Broadway Line), at 59th Street; serving the N, R, and W trains
  - Fifth Avenue/53rd Street (IND Queens Boulevard Line), at 53rd Street; serving the E, F, and <F> trains
  - Fifth Avenue (IRT Flushing Line), at 42nd Street; serving the 7 and <7> trains
- Fifth Avenue Line (Brooklyn elevated), demolished Brooklyn–Manhattan Transit Corporation rapid transit line
- Fifth Avenue Line (Brooklyn surface), a singular bus route in Brooklyn
- Madison and Fifth Avenues buses, several bus routes in Manhattan
- Fifth Avenue Bus Company, a former double-decker manufacturer
- Fifth Avenue Coach Company and Surface Transit, a former bus operator in Manhattan

=== Philippines ===
- 5th Avenue station (LRT), a train station on the Manila LRT Line 1 in Caloocan
- 5th Avenue station (PNR), a train station on the Philippine National Railways in Caloocan

== Arts and entertainment ==
- 5th Avenue (album), an album by Christina Aguilar
- 5th Avenue Cinema, a projection theater in Portland, Oregon
- 5th Avenue Theatre, a landmark theatre building located in Seattle, Washington
- Fifth Avenue Theatre, a Broadway theatre in New York City demolished in 1939
- 5th Avenue Theatre, a theater in Seattle, Washington
- Fifth Avenue (film), a 1926 American silent drama film
- Avenue 5, a 2020 comedy series
- "5th Avenue", a song by America from Perspective

== Other ==
- 5th Avenue (candy), a candy bar introduced in 1936
- Chrysler Fifth Avenue, a large car
- Fifth Avenue High School, Pittsburgh, Pennsylvania
- Fifth Avenue Vietnam Peace Parade Committee, an anti-war parade coordinator during the mid-1960s
- Saks Fifth Avenue, department store chain in the United States
- 5 Av, the fifth day of Av, the fifth month of the Hebrew calendar

== See also ==
- Fifth Street (disambiguation)
