= Town Topics (newspaper) =

Newspaper in Princeton, New Jersey

- Masthead logo
- Type: Weekly newspaper
- Format: Tabloid
- Owner: Witherspoon Media Group
- Founders: Cissy Stuart; Donald C. Stuart Jr.; Dan Coyle; Mary Coyle
- Editor-in-chief: Lynn Adams Smith
- Founded: 1946
- Language: English
- Headquarters: Princeton, New Jersey, USA
- Circulation: 15,600
- Price: Single issues: $5.00 mailed and 75 cents at newsstands. (July 25, 2007)
- Sister newspapers: Princeton Magazine
- Website: www.towntopics.com
- Free online archives: Princeton University Library

Town Topics is a weekly newspaper based in Princeton, New Jersey, with an estimated circulation of 15,600.

== History ==
Wellesley College graduate Emily "Cissy" Stuart (née Cowenhoven) and her husband, Princeton University graduate Donald C. Stuart Jr., first worked together at the Princeton Herald, a weekly newspaper which operated out of Princeton, New Jersey. In 1946 they established Town Topics as a weekly newspaper covering Princeton, together with Mary and Dan Coyle, Cissy's sister and brother-in-law. After Donald's death in 1981, the newspaper was administered by the Stuarts' son, Donald C. "Jeb" Stuart III (who became its editor-in-chief), and his wife Sheila. On April 2, 1989, Cissy was stabbed to death in her Mercer Street home in a quiet neighborhood near Princeton University. No suspects were ever identified, and as of January 2025, the case had yet to be solved.

Town Topics was purchased in 2001 from the Stuart family by a consortium led by Lynn Adams Smith, together with architect J. Robert Hillier and a small group of former employees. Town Topics purchased Princeton Magazine in 2008, and in 2012 launched LifeStories Magazine and Urban Agenda. All publications are now under the umbrella name of Witherspoon Media Group. Lynn Adams Smith is the editor-in-chief of Town Topics and Princeton Magazine.

== Description ==
Based in Princeton, New Jersey, the newspaper is known for its coverage of the township and its largest institution, Princeton University. While news coverage is mostly local, the newspaper's arts and entertainment coverage is more regional, with a coverage area that covers roughly the Trenton to New Brunswick portion of the Northeast Corridor. Town Topics is distributed to households in parts of the New Jersey municipalities of nearby Hopewell Borough, Hopewell Township, West Windsor Township, Lawrence Township, Pennington, Montgomery Township, and South Brunswick Township.

The newspaper was distributed free to readers in Princeton until 1980, when it switched to a subscription model. Its back pages are largely filled with real estate advertisements. The newspaper has an estimated circulation of 15,600.
