= New Utrecht Avenue Line =

The following transit lines have been known as the New Utrecht Avenue Line:

- New Utrecht Avenue Line or West End Line (Brooklyn surface), a former transit line running along New Utrecht Avenue and other streets between Coney Island and Sunset Park, built as a steam line (1863–1864), electrified 1893
- New Utrecht Avenue Line (elevated), normally called the BMT West End Line, built between 1913 and 1917 to replace the surface line
