= Highland Park Plaza Historic District =

Historic district in Virginia, United States

- U.S. National Register of Historic Places
- U.S. Historic district
- Virginia Landmarks Register
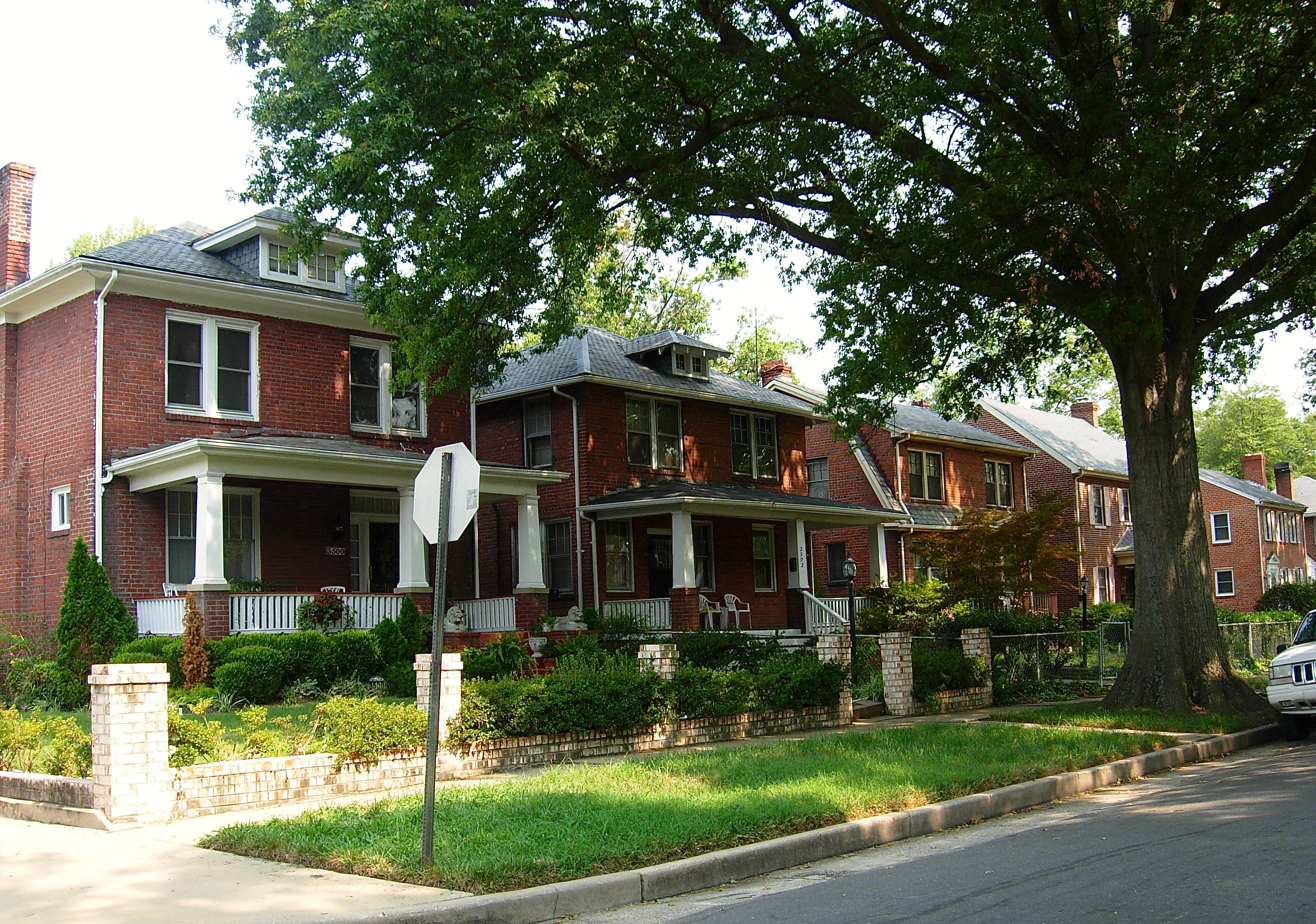
- Highland Park Plaza Historic District, August 2012

- Location within Virginia Location within the United States
- Location: Roughly bounded by Meadowbridge Rd., Missouri Ave., City limits, and Detroit Ave., Richmond, Virginia
- Coordinates: 37°34′29″N 77°24′58″W
- Area: 185 acres (75 ha)
- Built: 1889
- Architect: Baskervil and Lambert
- Architectural style: Queen Anne, Late 19th And 20th Century Revivals
- NRHP reference No.: 04001294
- VLR No.: 127-0831

Significant dates
- Added to NRHP: December 4, 2004
- Designated VLR: September 8, 2004

The Highland Park Plaza Historic District is a national historic district located at Highland Park, Richmond, Virginia. The district encompasses 1,005 contributing buildings located north of downtown Richmond and east of Barton Heights and Brookland Park. The primarily residential area developed starting in the late-19th century as one of the city's early "streetcar suburbs." It was added to the National Register of Historic Places in 2004.

== Architecture ==
The buildings are in a variety of popular late-19th and early-20th century architectural styles, including Queen Anne, American Foursquare, Colonial Revival, Tudor Revival, and bungalow. Notable buildings include the Charles T. Culpepper House (c. 1900), Napoleon B. Palmieri House, Dr. Clyde B. Reece House (c. 1910), Sta-Kleen Inn (c. 1910), Engine Company No. 15 Firehouse (c. 1915), Highland Park Plaza Park Recreation Building, Dr. Frank K. Lord House (c. 1920), Highland Park Service Station, Highland Park Methodist Church (1927), and Featherstone Filling Station.
