= Fifth Street Viaduct =

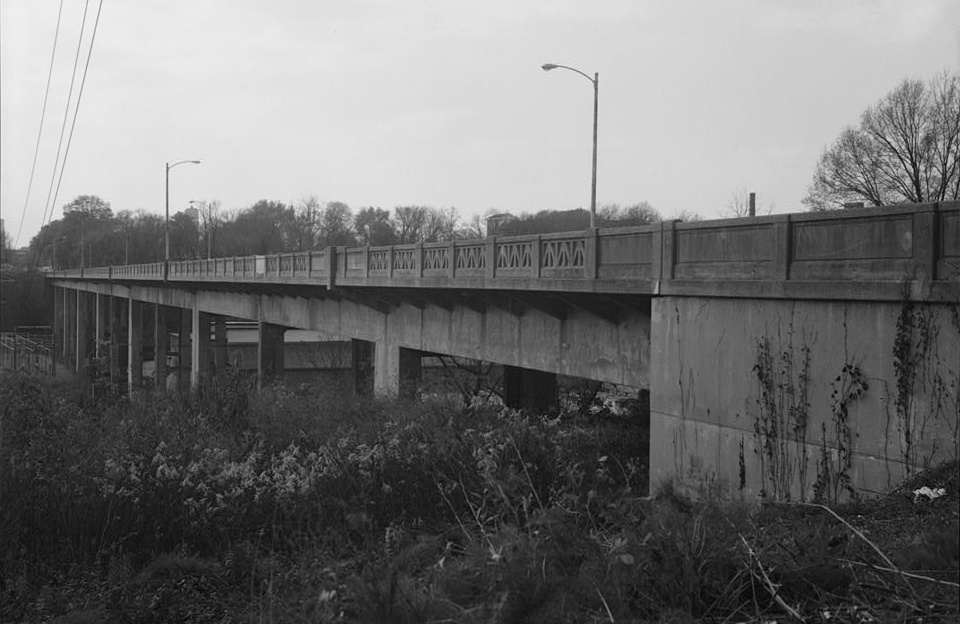
- 1933 Fifth Street Viaduct from the northeast
- Coordinates: 37°33′12.1″N 77°25′39.1″W
- Carries: Fifth Street
- Crosses: Bacon's Quarter Branch
- Locale: Richmond, Virginia
- Official name: Curtis Holt Sr. Bridge
- Other name: Fifth Street Bridge

History
- Opened: 1997

Location
- Interactive map of Fifth Street Viaduct

The Fifth Street Viaduct or the Fifth Street Bridge, officially the Curtis Holt Sr. Bridge, is a bridge crossing Bacon's Quarter Branch in the Shockoe Valley of Richmond, Virginia in the United States. It carries automobile and pedestrian traffic between Downtown Richmond's Jackson Ward and Gilpin Court with the North Side's Chestnut Hill and Highland Park.

== History ==
=== 1891 bridge ===
The first Fifth Street Viaduct, also called the Northside Viaduct, was an iron structure completed in February 1891 for streetcars, which had been introduced in Richmond in 1887. It included a vehicular roadway, a walkway, and double-tracked street railway and was described as "a splendid iron structure 40 feet wide and 1200 feet long, costing about $80,000 ..." in a developer's advertisement at the time. The streetcar line allowed for the development of Chestnut Hill and Highland Park which were streetcar suburbs north of the deep Shockoe Valley. The Northside Viaduct was opened to the public on April 23, 1891. Masonry remnants of the north abutment of this original bridge are still visible.

The extension of Fifth Street north of Hospital St., along with the construction of the Fifth Street Viaduct, or Northside Viaduct, destroyed many graves in the Shockoe Hill African Burying Ground. The street and viaduct were constructed directly through the burial ground. At the time of construction, the burial ground appeared on maps as Potter's Field.

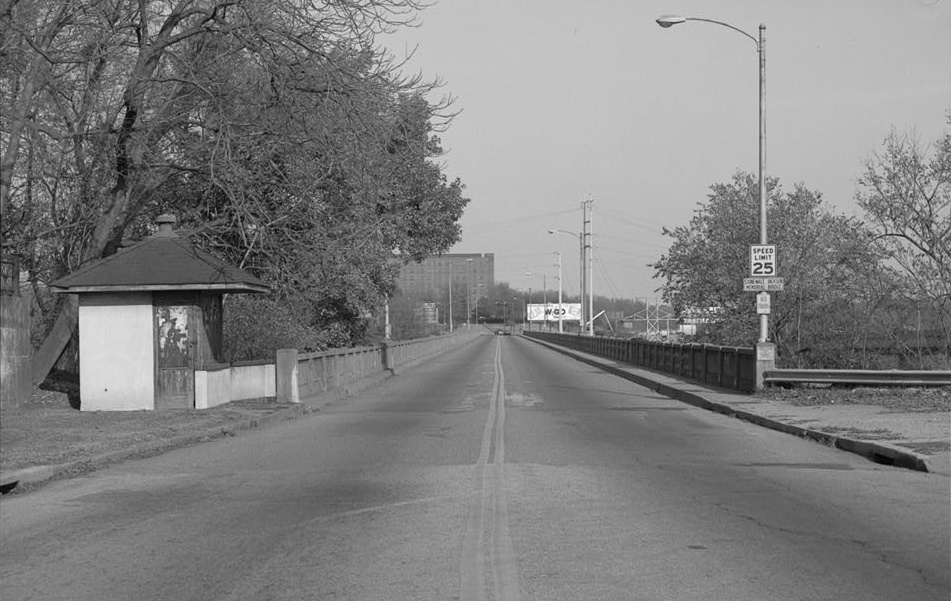
The 1933 Fifth Street Viaduct viewed from the south. The toll house is to the left.

=== 1933 bridge ===
The second Fifth Street Viaduct was a reinforced concrete bridge built in 1933 to allow for automobile, streetcar, and pedestrian travel between the neighborhoods of Highland Park and Jackson Ward. The design was drafted by Alfredo C. Janni and the bridge was built by the Richmond Bridge Corporation. The 1,185-foot (360 m) bridge consisted of seven double-span rigid frames supported on expansion piers and stiff towers and was one of five Richmond bridges built during 1933-34 in a major public works program sponsored by the Richmond Bridge Corporation in conjunction with local authorities

On December 23, 1933, after several days of preliminary streetcar usage, the Fifth Street Viaduct opened for all forms of travel. The bridge was tolled until August 1935 and the City of Richmond agreed to retire the debt of the Richmond Bridge Corporation through annual cash payments.

On July 17, 1941, at the urging of City Council member John Hirshberg, the Fifth Street Viaduct was officially renamed the Stonewall Jackson Memorial Bridge.

=== Current bridge ===
The current Fifth Street Viaduct opened in August 1997. In 2000, the name of the bridge was changed to the Curtis Holt Sr. Bridge. The renaming of the bridge was among several such renamings cited as the impetus for a failed 2004 Virginia Assembly bill to restrict such actions in the Commonwealth.

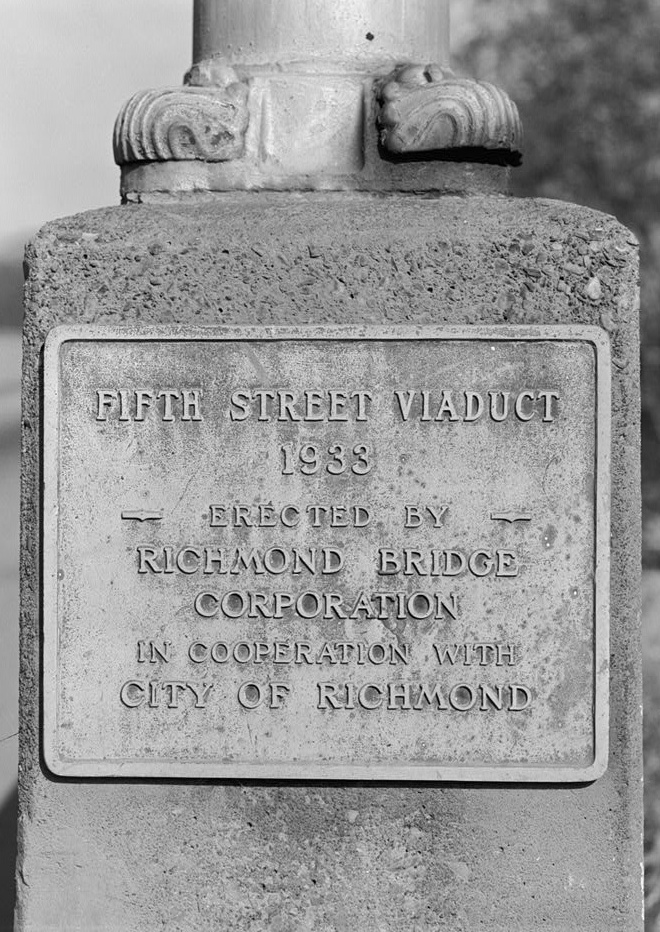
Metal bridge plate on the south end of the 1933 Fifth Street Viaduct

== See also ==
- List of bridges documented by the Historic American Engineering Record in Virginia
