= Fifth Avenue station (San Diego) =

San Diego Trolley station

Fifth Avenue
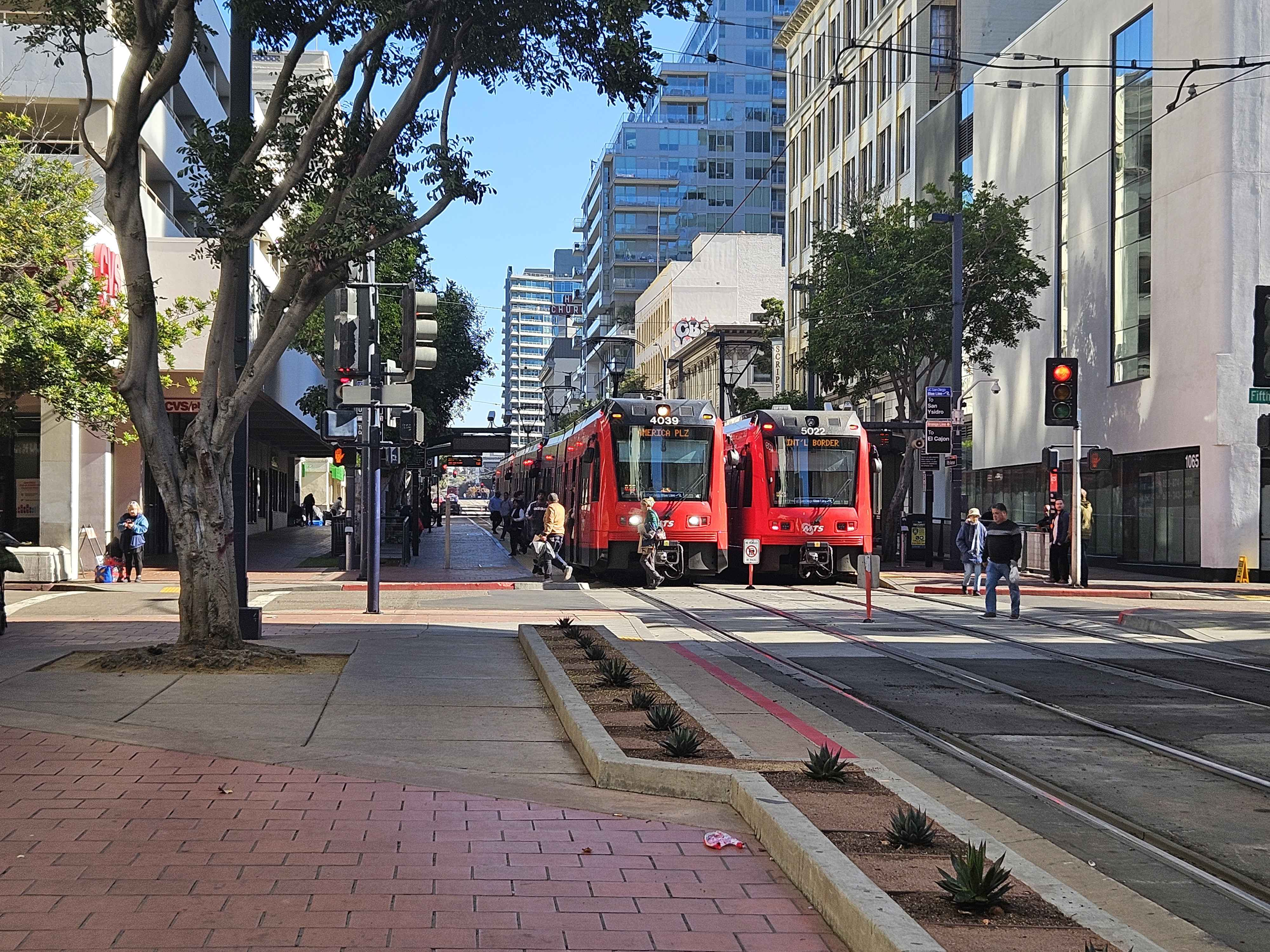
- Blue Line trolleys at Fifth Avenue

General information
- Location: 500 C Street; San Diego, California; United States
- Coordinates: 32.716749°N 117.160051°W
- Owner: San Diego Metropolitan Transit System
- Operator: San Diego Trolley
- Platforms: 2 side platforms
- Tracks: 2
- Connections: MTS: 3, 120

Construction
- Structure type: At-grade
- Accessible: Disabled access

Other information
- Station code: 75088, 75089

History
- Opened: July 26, 1981
- Rebuilt: 2013
- Former names: Gaslamp (1981–1990)

Services
Preceding station	San Diego Trolley	Following station
Civic Center toward UTC	Blue Line	City College toward San Ysidro
Civic Center toward Courthouse	Orange Line	City College toward El Cajon
Civic Center One-way operation	Silver Line	City College Next clockwise
Location

Fifth Avenue station (formerly Gaslamp station) is a station of the Orange Line, Blue Line, and Silver Line on the San Diego Trolley. It is located in the Core district of downtown San Diego, California. The station is located along on C Street, between Sixth Avenue and its namesake Fifth Avenue, surrounded by several office buildings.

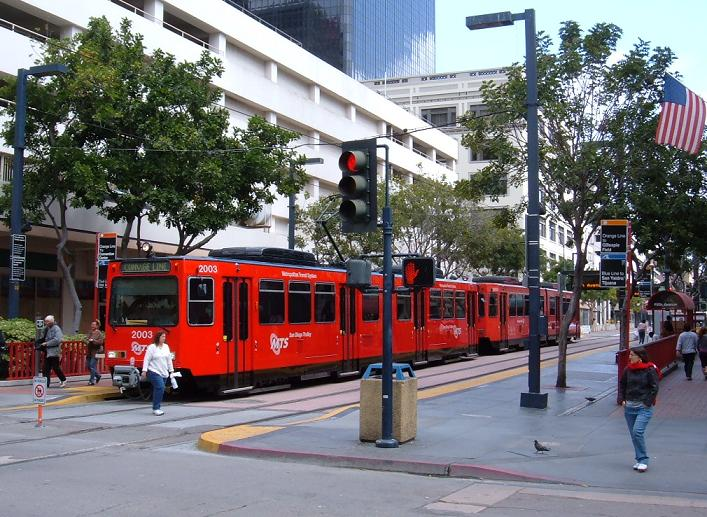
Fifth Avenue Station before Trolley Renewal

It is one of the original stations of the San Diego Trolley, opening on July 26, 1981. At the time of opening, it was called Gaslamp station, due to its proximity to the Gaslamp Quarter. During the development of the Bayside extension, which would include a station much closer to the Gaslamp Quarter, this station was often called Gaslamp North station, while the new station was called Gaslamp South. When the Bayside extension opened in 1990, the new stop was called Gaslamp Quarter station, and this station was renamed Fifth Avenue to avoid confusion.

This station was closed between December 17, 2012 and June 2013 for renovations as part of the Trolley Renewal Project.
