= B63 (New York City bus) =

Bus route in Brooklyn, New York

b63
- Fifth Avenue Line
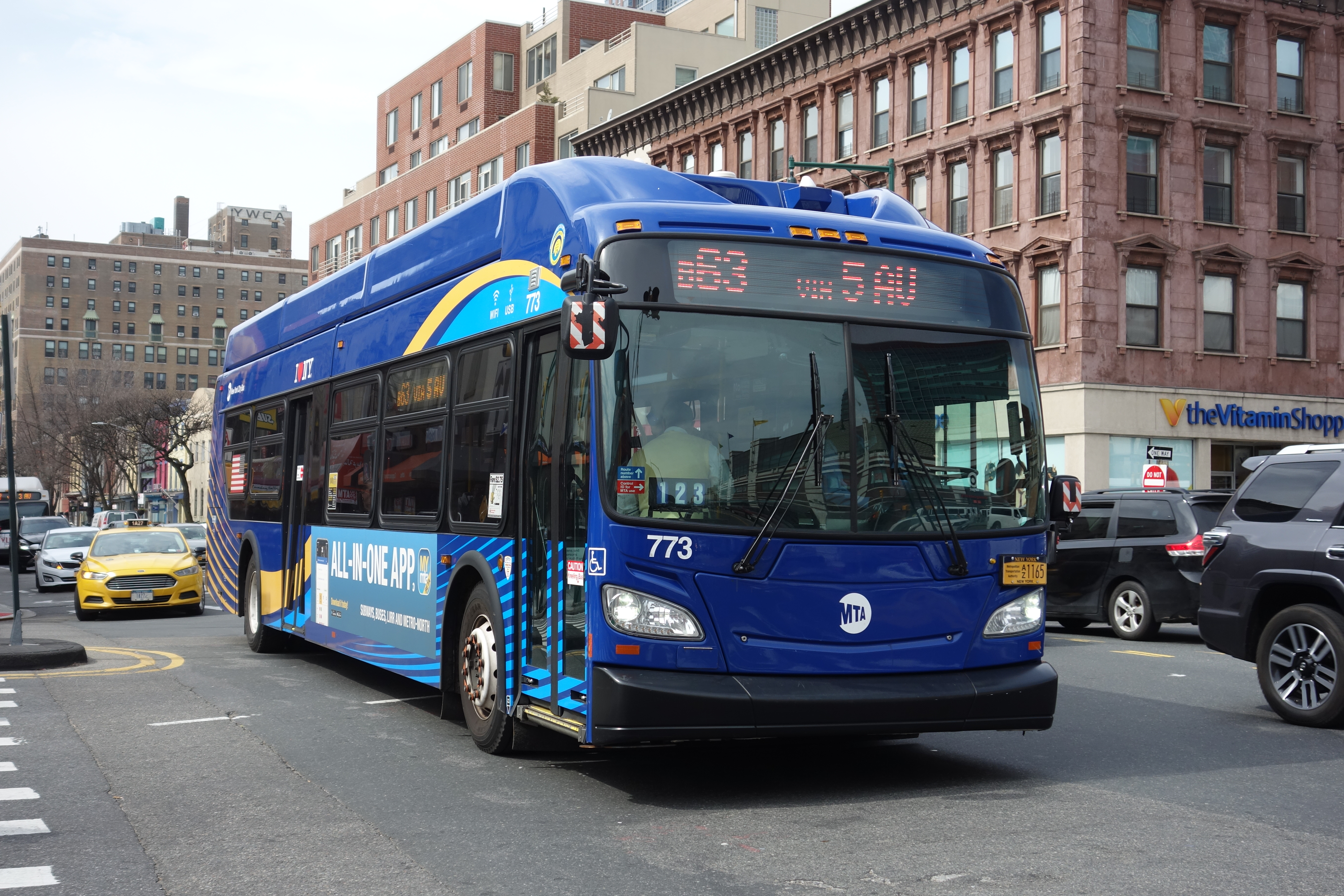
- A 2017 XN40 (773) on the B63 in Downtown Brooklyn at Atlantic Terminal in March 2019

Overview
- System: MTA Regional Bus Operations
- Operator: New York City Transit Authority
- Garage: Jackie Gleason Depot
- Vehicle: New Flyer C40LF CNG; New Flyer Xcelsior XN40
- Began service: August 28, 1860

Route
- Locale: Brooklyn, New York, U.S.
- Communities served: Fort Hamilton, Bay Ridge, Sunset Park, Park Slope, Downtown Brooklyn, Boerum Hill, Cobble Hill
- Start: Brooklyn Bridge Park – Pier 6
- Via: Fifth Avenue, Atlantic Avenue
- End: Bay Ridge – Shore Road
- Length: 7.5 miles (12.1 km)
- Other routes: B37 Third Avenue

Service
- Operates: 24 hours
- Annual patronage: 2,775,365 (2025)
- Transfers: Yes
- Timetable: B63

The B63 is a bus route in Brooklyn, New York City, running mainly along Fifth Avenue and Atlantic Avenue between Fort Hamilton and Cobble Hill. Originally a streetcar line called the Fifth Avenue Line, it is now operated by the New York City Transit Authority as the Fifth/Atlantic Avenues bus.

== Route description ==
The B63 bus route begins at Shore Road and Fourth Avenue in Fort Hamilton, and heads north on Fourth Avenue, splitting onto Fifth Avenue at 94th Street. Fifth Avenue is followed through Bay Ridge, Sunset Park, and Gowanus to Park Slope, where buses turn northwest on Flatbush Avenue and west on Atlantic Avenue to South Ferry. Along the way, connections with the New York City Subway can be made at Bay Ridge–95th Street, Fourth Avenue–Ninth Street, and Atlantic Avenue–Barclays Center, as well as the Long Island Rail Road's Atlantic Branch at Atlantic Terminal.

=== School trippers ===
When school is in session, five buses depart for South Ferry from Fort Hamilton High School at Shore Road/83rd Street during the P.M. rush. These buses head to Fifth Avenue via 83rd Street, Colonial Road, and 86th Street. One 2:07 trip and both 2:57 trips terminate at the Jackie Gleason Depot at 39th Street.

Three more buses originate at 5th Street outside MS 51 William Alexander at 3:05pm. One bus goes to Pier 6 and the others head toward Fort Hamilton, with one terminating at 33rd Street.

== History ==
=== As a streetcar route ===
The Brooklyn Central and Jamaica Railroad opened the line along Fifth Avenue, from its Atlantic Avenue Line south to 24th Street at Greenwood Cemetery, on August 28, 1860. The Brooklyn, Bath and Coney Island Rail Road opened on October 5, 1863, running steam dummies from Fifth Avenue and 36th Street (the city line) south to 37th Street, and east on 37th Street and south towards Coney Island. At the same time, the Central Railroad extended its Fifth Avenue Line south to 36th Street. The Atlantic Avenue Railroad, the Central's successor, gained control of the Brooklyn, Bath and West End Railroad, the BB&CI's successor, in January 1893, and soon changed it to an electric trolley line.

The Nassau Electric Railroad was incorporated in 1893, and its plans included the east–west Church Avenue Line along 39th Street and a branch south along Fifth Avenue into New Utrecht. The Nassau Electric leased the Atlantic Avenue on April 5, 1896, and opened their Fifth Avenue Line that day as an extension of the Atlantic Avenue's line all the way to Fort Hamilton; they also continued to operate West End Line cars via Fifth Avenue, and soon also ran cars to Coney Island over Fifth Avenue and the 86th Street Line.

=== As a bus route ===
Bus service numbered the B63 replaced streetcar service on February 20, 1949.

In February 2011, the B63 became the first bus route in Brooklyn to test the tracking real time arrival system called MTA Bus Time. The pilot program was implemented after similar technology had been tested on the M16 and M34 buses in Manhattan during 2010. Following the success of MTA Bus Time on the B63, the program was expanded to all bus routes in the city.

On December 1, 2022, the MTA released a draft redesign of the Brooklyn bus network. As part of the redesign, the B63 would maintain its existing routing, but closely spaced stops would be eliminated.
