= West End Line (Brooklyn surface) =

New York City Subway Line

Brooklyn, Bath and Coney Island Railroad West End Line
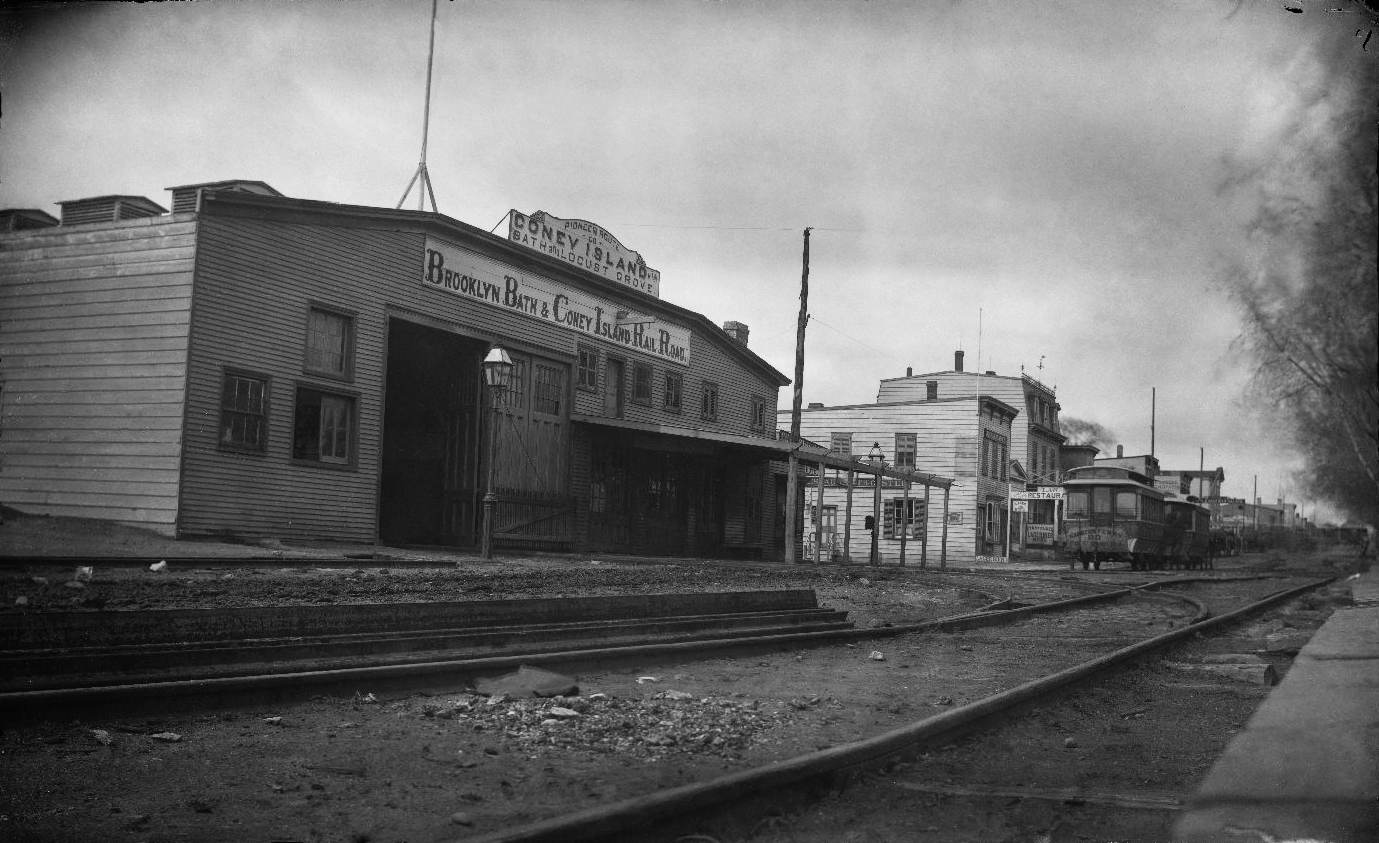
- A Brooklyn, Bath and Coney Island Railroad station at Coney Island in the late 1870s

Overview
- Owner: Brooklyn, Bath and Coney Island Railroad
- Termini: 36th Street - Fifth Avenue El; West End Depot (Coney Island - Stillwell Avenue)
- Stations: 20

Service
- Type: Trolley
- System: Brooklyn, Bath and Coney Island Railroad
- Operator: Brooklyn, Bath and Coney Island Railroad

History
- Opened: 1862–1916
- Closed: 1947

Technical
- Number of tracks: 2
- Character: Elevated at 36th Street terminal, ran on surface level after ramp down to ground level until last stop.
- Track gauge: 4 ft 8 1/2 in (1,435 mm)
- Electrification: 600V DC third rail

The West End Line or New Utrecht Avenue Line was a surface transit line in Brooklyn, New York City, United States, running along New Utrecht Avenue and other streets between Coney Island and Sunset Park. Built by the Brooklyn, Bath and Coney Island Railroad as a steam line, it became a trolley line, along which elevated trains ran until the new elevated BMT West End Line opened. This route is no longer part of any bus line; its southern part (south of Bath Beach) was part of a bus route (the B64, which replaced the 86th Street Line trolleys, until 2010). In 2013, the B64 route to Coney Island was restored.

== History ==
=== Steam railroad (1863–1893) ===
The Brooklyn, Bath and Coney Island Railroad, incorporated in 1862 with Charles Godfrey Gunther as president, opened the first part of its line, from 25th Street and Fifth Avenue to Bath Beach mainly along New Utrecht Avenue (then the Bath Plank Road), on October 9, 1863. The extension to Coney Island was opened on June 9, 1864, making it the first steam railroad to bring beachgoers from downtown Brooklyn. (The Coney Island and Brooklyn Railroad had been operating horse cars to the island since 1862.) At the Brooklyn end, the steam line ended at 36th Street and Fifth Avenue, where the BB&CI's own horse cars ran to a connection with those of the Brooklyn Central and Jamaica Railroad's Fifth Avenue Line and the Brooklyn City Railroad's Greenwood Line at 25th Street and Fifth Avenue. The odd double transfer was made necessary by the City of Brooklyn's refusal to allow the line to operate steam cars within its city limits.

The road took its common name from the area of its terminal on Coney Island, where a hotel of the same name, but unconnected to the railroad, existed. Its terminal was known as West End Terminal, a name which survived upon major rebuilding in 1919 as New West End Terminal before that name fell into disuse.

The road was reorganized in 1868, on January 22, 1879, and again on December 1, 1885, the latter time changing its name to the Brooklyn, Bath and West End Railroad, formalizing the use of West End in the line's name. Before that time, the original steam dummy cars, which consisted of a locomotive and passenger car in one railroad-coach-type frame, were replaced by conventional steam locomotives pulling unpowered coaches.

=== Trolley line (1893–1947) ===
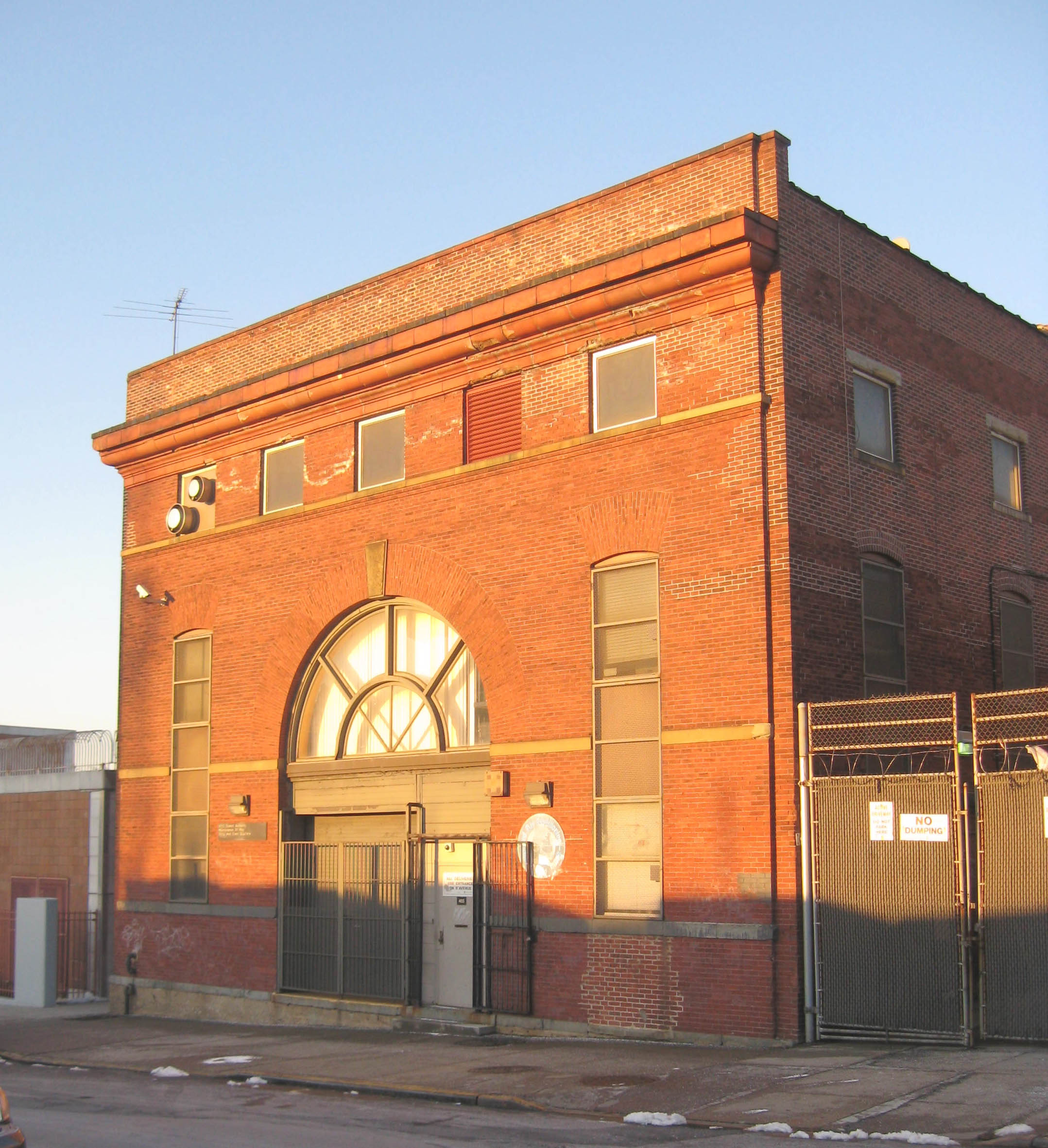
Powerhouse

The Atlantic Avenue Railroad gained control of the West End in January 1893, leased it on May 8, 1893, and began to electrify it immediately without the permission of the town of New Utrecht. Effective May 21, 1893, the Atlantic Avenue extended its Fifth Avenue Line (which was electrified March 14, 1893) along the West End's trackage to the Union Depot at 36th Street, where West End trains were subsequently terminated. Electric trolleys began running on the West End Line from the Union Depot to Coney Island on November 18, 1893, and soon from the 39th Street Ferry. The Nassau Electric Railroad leased the Atlantic Avenue, and thus the West End, at midnight at the end of April 4, 1896, implementing its universal five-cent fare between Downtown Brooklyn and Coney Island. In late May the 86th Street Line was placed in operation, using the West End trackage from Bath Beach to Coney Island. Some West End cars were extended over the Brooklyn Bridge to Park Row in Lower Manhattan on February 15, 1898. The Brooklyn, Bath and West End Railroad and Atlantic Avenue Railroad were consolidated into the Nassau Electric Railroad in July 1898.

The Brooklyn Rapid Transit Company (BRT) gained control of the Nassau Electric in November 1898 and leased it (and the Brooklyn Union Elevated Railroad, operator of the Fifth Avenue Elevated, among other lines) to the Brooklyn Heights Railroad on April 1, 1899. On June 4, 1899, a new switch at Bath Junction was placed in service, and the Park Row-Coney Island cars were rerouted via the Sea Beach Line; West End cars from Downtown Brooklyn continued to use the West End Line through Bath Beach.

BRT control paved the way for the line to be connected to the elevated system, and, on December 19, 1900, trolleys between 36th Street and Bath Beach were replaced with elevated trains from Park Row in Lower Manhattan; the line beyond Bath Beach to Coney Island was part of the 86th Street Line. Trains operated by third rail power over the Fifth Avenue Elevated to a ramp at 37th Street, and, from that point, trains raised trolley poles to operate using overhead wire to Bath Beach. A new bridge over Coney Island Creek was built to allow heavy elevated trains to run to Coney Island, and this service, from Park Row to Coney Island, began on July 13, 1902, for ten cents.

The Nassau Electric Railroad lease to the Brooklyn Heights Railroad was canceled on June 30, 1904, and dual operation began, where the Brooklyn Heights (later the Brooklyn Union Elevated Railroad and New York Consolidated Railroad) operated the trains to 38th Street, and the surface operation beyond to Coney Island was done by the Nassau Electric.

Elevated operations on the surface ended on June 24, 1916, when the new elevated West End Line, connecting into the Fourth Avenue Subway, opened to 18th Avenue. The line was built as part of Contract 4 of the Dual Contracts, but at the BRT's own expense. Trolleys continued to operate on the portion south of the Church Avenue Line (39th Street) until June 28, 1947.

== Stations ==
Neighborhood	Station	Type	Opened	Transfers and notes
Sunset Park	Union Depot	local/express	June 1862	Originally at 5th Avenue and 26th Street, moved to 5th Avenue and 36th Street on 1890 , inferred, due to construction of BER Fifth Avenue Line to 25th Street. Converted to trolley, 1916
Sunset Park	39th Street	local	circa. 1887	Converted to trolley, 1916
Borough Park	43rd Street	local	circa. 1887	Also known as West Brooklyn (43rd Street). Converted to trolley, 1916
Borough Park	49th Street	local	1903	Converted to trolley, 1916
Borough Park	53rd Street	local	mid-1890s	Also known as Blythebourne. Converted to trolley, 1916
Borough Park	58th Street	local	1903	Converted to trolley, 1916
Bensonhurst
Bensonhurst	Bath Junction	local/express	circa. 1890	Also known as Lefferts Park Junction. Converted to trolley, 1916. Transfer available to the Sea Beach Line
Bensonhurst	69th Street	local	circa. 1867	Also known as Weir's Hill (pre-circa. 1877), Weir, (post-circa. 1877), Lefferts Park, and Homewood. Converted to trolley, 1916
Bensonhurst	74th Street	local/express	1903	Converted to trolley, 1916
Bensonhurst	79th Street	local	1903	Converted to trolley, 1916
Gravesend/Bath Beach
Gravesend/Bath Beach	84th Street	local	circa. 1890	Also known as Van Pelt Manor and 86th Street. Converted to trolley, 1916
Gravesend/Bath Beach	Bath Beach Junction	local/express	June 1862	Converted to trolley, 1916
Gravesend/Bath Beach	20th Avenue	local	1903	Also known as Bay 25th Street. Converted to trolley, 1916
Gravesend/Bath Beach	Bensonhurst	local	circa. 1890	Located between 21st Avenue and Bay 28th Street on Bath Avenue. Closed 1903. Converted to trolley, 1916
Gravesend/Bath Beach	22nd Avenue	local	1903	Converted to trolley, 1916
Gravesend/Bath Beach	Ulmer Park	local	1903	Also known as 23rd Avenue. Converted to trolley, 1916
Gravesend/Bath Beach	Bay 35th Street	local/express	circa. 1887	Also known as Ulmer Park and Unionville. Converted to trolley, 1916. Mini-siding; demolished between 1920 and 1930
Tracks split to Unionville Depot
Coney Island
Coney Island	Bay 50th Street	local	1903	Converted to trolley, 1916
Coney Island	Bridge	local	circa. 1890	Also known as Fishing until circa. 1900. Closed 1903. Located at the B.B.&C.I. ROW and Coney Island Creek.Possibly also known as Hubbard Creek as no mention of a station on "Hubbard's Creek" on the BMT Sea Beach Line can be found, with its close proximity to Gravesend station on the NY&SB to where its location would be at slightly to the left of 147 Avenue X.
Coney Island	Coney Island - Stilwell Avenue	local/express		Originally West End Depot. Transfer available to Culver, Sea Beach, Brighton Beach, Norton's Point and Sea Gate Lines
