= 5th Street station =

5th Street station or Fifth Street station may refer to:

- 5th Street station (Los Angeles Metro), a Los Angeles Metro station
- Fifth Street station (Miami), a Miami Metromover station
- Fifth Street station (LIRR)
- 5th Street/Independence Hall station, a SEPTA subway station in Philadelphia
- 5th Street station (DC Streetcar), a light rail stop in Washington, D.C.

== See also ==
- 5th Street (disambiguation)
