= Curtis J. Holt Sr. =

American activist

Curtis J. Holt Sr. was a social activist who challenged the imposition of a moral code through subsidies and other forms of state funding. He is most notable for the changes he brought to local governance in Richmond, Virginia.

== Early life ==
Holt was born in Rocky Mount, North Carolina in 1920, one of eight children in a relatively poor family. His farmer father died when he was aged 13 and his mother relocated the family to Richmond, Virginia in 1934, where Holt took a job to help support the family.

In 1941 he was injured at a construction job at Virginia Union University (VUU, a historically black university), leaving him out of work for three years. In 1963, he fell down an elevator shaft causing another injury which put him out of work permanently. That forced him and his family into public housing, where he found poor living conditions and repressive conditions.

== Public housing activism ==
Holt took issue with the repressive rules governing public housing, such as a prohibition by the Richmond Housing Authority (RRHA) on tenant organizations and meetings on RRHA property. In the mid-1960s he attempted to organize the tenants of Creighton Court, his residence, into an association, and was almost evicted for purported unreported income for cutting hair of his Boy Scout Team which he was a Cubmaster at Fourth Baptist Church. Holt, later won the case and lived in Creighton Court until 1986 with his family consisting of his wife: Alto Mae Holt, sons (Curtis J. Holt Jr and Walter Holt), and daughters (Valarie Holt and Constance Holt-Christian).

== Civil rights activism ==
In 1972 Richmond City Council elections were suspended after Holt filed a lawsuit challenging the city's annexation of part of Chesterfield County. This annexation was part of a larger movement called Massive Resistance, and was an attempt by the largely white city council to retain a white majority in the city during a time of immense white flight. Holt argued that the annexation diluted black voting power.

In 1977, federal courts ordered a plan to replace the at-large voting system for the council with a larger city council divided into nine wards. The result was a black-majority city council that then elected Henry L. Marsh as the city's first black mayor.

Holt was also known for engaging in issues of class (specifically lower and middle class) that the mainstream civil rights movement did not want to confront. His abilities to organize poor whites in Richmond's public housing was particularly effective in changing RRHA policy.

One of the RRHA policies he disputed was clearly intended to enforce a particular moral code. Specifically, RRHA would not allow single female parents habitation in public housing. Because of this, Holt argued that women who were single and became pregnant felt pressure to either have an abortion and lose the child or lose their home. Holt's support of this issue was ahead of his time in terms of championing the right of a single parent female to control her reproductive rights.

== Recognition ==
In 2000, many years after his death, Richmond's City Council voted to change the name of the Fifth Street Viaduct from Stonewall Jackson Memorial Bridge to the Curtis Holt Sr. Bridge.
