= Arthur J. DiTommaso Memorial Bridge =

Cable stayed bridge in Fitchburg, Massachusetts

Coordinates: 42.5755°N 71.7878°W

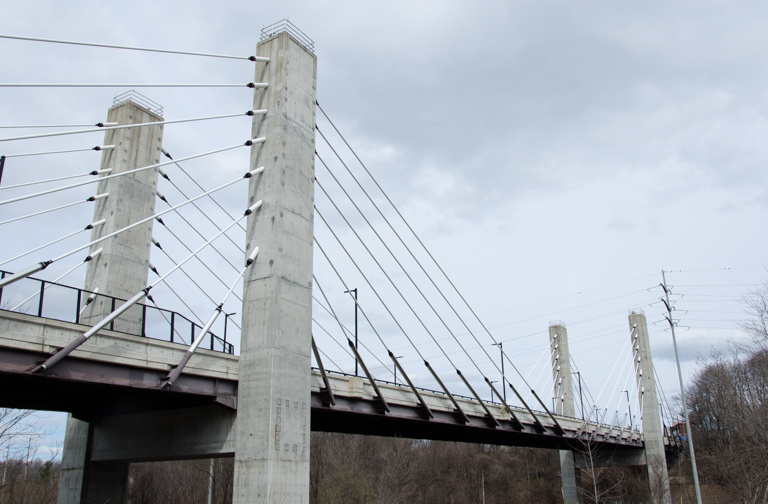
The Arthur J. DiTommaso Memorial Bridge in Fitchburg, Massachusetts, crossing the MBTA tracks.

The 5th street bridge, also known as the Arthur J. DiTommaso Memorial Bridge, is a cable stayed bridge in Fitchburg, Massachusetts. It crosses the North Nashua River and the Fitchburg Line of the MBTA Commuter Rail.

== See also ==
- North Nashua River
- Fitchburg Line
