= Nicasius de Sille =

Doctor Nicasius de Sille

Special Ambassador of the Dutch Republic to England, Denmark, France, and Germany
- In office 1587–1600

Deputy to the States-General of the Netherlands
- In office 1585–1587

Secretary of State of the Dutch Republic
- In office 1578–1585

Representative of Namur in the Assembly of Brussels
- In office 1577–1578

Personal details
- Born: August 3, 1543 Mechelen
- Died: August 22, 1600 (aged 57) Amsterdam, Netherlands
- Spouse: Genoveve de Romaignan
- Children: Laurens de Sille

Dr. Nicasius de Sille (1543–1600) was a 16th-century statesman from what is now Belgium who served as a special ambassador of the Dutch Republic to several nations, and as secretary to future-Holy Roman Emperor Matthias.

== Early life ==
Nicasius was born August 3, 1543, in the city of Mechelen, Habsburg Netherlands, the son of Nicolaas de Sille and Barbara van der Goes. His grandfather, Antonius de Sille, was a page for Philip, Duke of Burgundy.

He spent his early life studying, eventually becoming a Doctor Juris and practicing at the Superior Court of Mechelen.

== Political career ==
In 1576, Nicasius was sent by the state to annex Gelderland. In 1577, he became the pensionary of Namur, and represented the city at the Assembly of Brussels. The following year he signed the Union of Brussels.

In 1578, he became secretary to the Council of State for Archduke Matthias, who had become governor-general of the Netherlands as a result of the Dutch revolt, and secretary for the General States. After the fall of the Southern Provinces, de Sille removed to Holland where he became pensionary of Amsterdam while maintaining his duties as secretary. In 1579, on a mission to secure Mechelen, he was arrested and imprisoned out of revenge, but was released shortly thereafter.

In 1584, de Sille made up the conditions of homage of Prince William to negotiate with the Earl of Leicester pertaining to control of the Habsburg Netherlands. Later that year Nicasius was sent as a deputy to the States-General, marking the first of repeated terms until his death in 1600.

In 1587, de Sille was sent as a special ambassador to England, appearing at the embassy before Queen Elizabeth. He is mentioned in Elizabeth's "Calendar of State Papers Foreign" on several occasions. Following the successful mission, Nicasius was sent as a special ambassador several times to Denmark, Germany, and France. He would also serve twice as a commissioner of the Army.

== Marriage and family ==
On January 31, 1571, he married in Namur Genoveve de Romaignan, daughter of Laurens de Romaignan and Philippotte le Noire. Genoveve died the following year, leaving Nicasius a son:

- Laurens de Sille (1572-1637), burgomeister of Arnhem and later treasurer of Brabant; he and his wife Walburga Everwyn had five children, including:
  - Nicasius de Sille (1610-c.1674), who emigrated to New Amsterdam in 1653 and became First Councillor to Governor Peter Stuyvesant

De Sille remarried to Johanna de Trello (also: de Thrello, van Trillo), and had two daughters:

- Johanna de Sille, who married Sir Daniel van Hofdijck, Lord of Middelharnis
- Clara de Sille

He died in Amsterdam on August 22, 1600, and was buried there at the Oude Kerk.
