= New Utrecht, Brooklyn =

Former town in Long Island, New York

Coordinates: 40°36′36″N 74°0′12″W

House of Nicasius de Sille in New Utrecht

New Utrecht (Dutch: Nieuw Utrecht) was a town in western Long Island, New York encompassing all or part of the present-day Bath Beach, Bay Ridge, Bensonhurst, Borough Park, Dyker Heights and Fort Hamilton neighborhoods of Brooklyn, New York City. New Utrecht was established in 1652 by Dutch settlers in the Dutch colony of New Netherland, the last of the original six towns to be founded in Kings County. New Utrecht ceased to exist in 1894 when it was annexed by the City of Brooklyn, and became part of the City of Greater New York when Brooklyn joined as a borough in 1898.

== History ==
=== Dutch settlement ===
In 1643, Anthony Janszoon van Salee, a half-Dutch, half-Moroccan son of a pirate, and a resident of New Amsterdam, obtained from the Director General of New Netherland a patent on a tract of land of more than 200 acres on western Long Island. It ran along the shore of the Bay opposite Staten Island. Most of the land was undeveloped until 1652, when Cornelius van Werckhoven took it over. A surveyor, Werckhoven was born in Utrecht in the Netherlands, and became a principal investor in the Dutch West India Company. Upon Van Werckhoven's death in 1655, Jacques Cortelyou, guardian for Werckhoven's children, received permission to sell lots of the land to create a town. Twenty lots were laid out. Cortelyou named the settlement Nieuw Utrecht after Werckhoven's hometown.

Nicasius de Sille, an attorney from Arnhem, Gelderland, was one of the first to purchase a lot. He built a house using locally available stone, topped with red roof tiles imported from the Netherlands. He moved to New Utrecht from his former residence in New Amsterdam, at the lower part of the island near the current intersection of Broad Street and Exchange Place. De Sille served as an advisor to Governor Petrus Stuyvesant and as a "schout fiscal", a combination of sheriff and district attorney. In 1660, de Sille completed a "List of the Inhabitants of New Amsterdam", at the behest of Stuyvesant. The names and addresses on the list correspond to the houses drawn on the Castello Plan.

Once a defensive palisade wall was erected around the town of New Utrecht on western Long Island, more residents settled there. In 1657, New Utrecht was granted status as a village, and in 1661 Governor Peter Stuyvesant provided New Utrecht its own charter. New Netherland was taken over by the English in 1664, who changed its name to the Province of New York.

The Bensons were among the original Dutch settlers in New Utrecht. Other early families in the town include di Sille, Van Pelt, Cropsey, and Nostrand. Cropsey Avenue and Nostrand Avenue in Brooklyn are named for the latter two founding families.

What is called the Van Pelt Manor House was built in stages. The first section, of stone, was built by Jan Van Cleef (Cleve) around 1675 and later sold to Nicholas de Meyer, who sold it to Teunis Van Pelt. An agreement with de Meyer allowed Van Cleef to live in the dwelling from 1691 until his death c. 1699. Around 1686, the house was enlarged and a second floor was added. Van Pelt's land was never established in deed nor granted the status of "Manor".

=== New Utrecht Cemetery and Reformed Church ===
The Van Pelt Manor house, at 18th Avenue and 82nd Street was built beginning in 1675, with a second floor added in 1686; it was razed in 1952

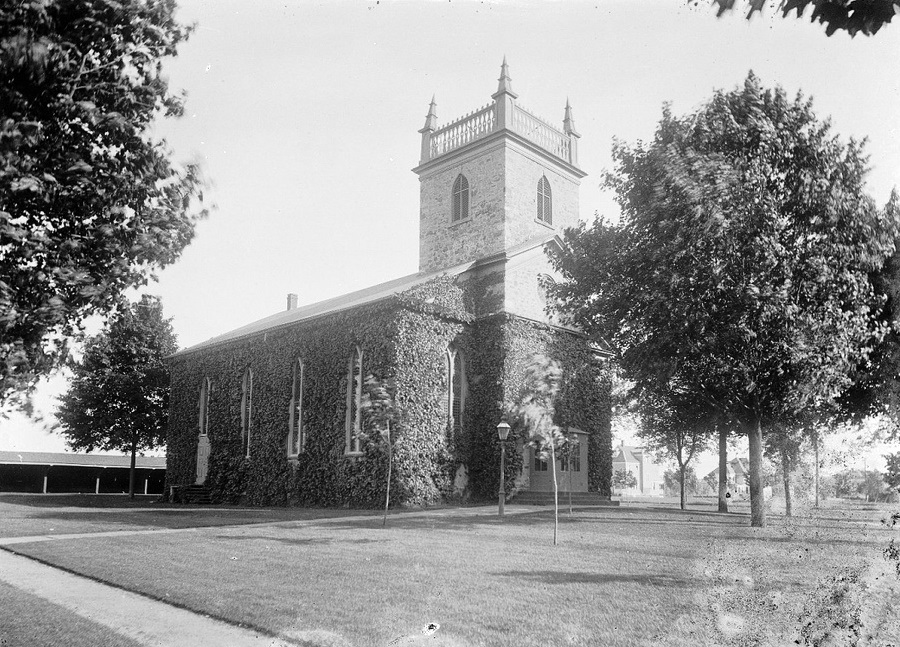
The New Utrecht Reformed Church at 18th Avenue and 84th Street (photographed between 1899 and 1909)

Initially, the residents in New Utrecht went to Flatbush for Dutch Reformed religious services. But they created New Utrecht Cemetery in 1654. In 1677, they chartered New Utrecht Reformed Church to provide for a local congregation. They built their first church in 1700. The second (and current) church was built in the 1830s, using bricks from the first church. It has been designated as a National Historic Landmark, as has the cemetery.

In 1856, yellow fever spread from Staten Island to the inhabitants of Bay Ridge and Fort Hamilton in western Long Island. The New Utrecht Cemetery contains a monument, erected in 1910, to honor Dr. James E. DuBois and his assistant Dr. John L. Crane, who died fighting the outbreak. The church received landmark status in 1966; the parish house and the cemetery received landmark status in 1998. Both the church and the cemetery are listed in the National Register of Historic Places.

=== New Utrecht in Kings County ===
In 1683, when the English established Kings County within the Province of New York, New Utrecht was one of its six original towns. It came to encompass the villages of New Utrecht, Bath, Fort Hamilton and Bay Ridge. Town records were kept in the Dutch language until 1763. That year the British defeated France in the Seven Years' War and took over its territory in North America east of the Mississippi River. They asserted their power in New York as well, requiring records to be in English.

=== Revolutionary War ===
During the American Revolution, the British made New Utrecht their base of operations for the Battle of Long Island. The old Cortelyou mansion served as General Howe's headquarters after he landed on Long Island in August 1776. The British brought the mortally wounded American General Nathaniel Woodhull to the Nicasius di Sille house for treatment. The house was demolished in 1850.)

The bluff on which Fort Hamilton was built in the 1820s was occupied at this time by the houses of Denyse Denyse, Abraham Bennett, and Simon Cortelyou. In the bombardment from the British ships, on August 26, 1776, the Bennett and Denyse dwellings were struck by their shots. From 1776 to the end of the British occupation, sympathizers with the Patriot cause traveled by fishing boats at night across The Narrows to meet with compatriots in Staten Island and New Jersey.

During the War of 1812, the US Army began construction of a fort on Hendrick's Reef, an island offshore the southern tip of what is now Bay Ridge. Originally named Fort Diamond, it was renamed as Fort Lafayette in 1825 to honor the Marquis de La Fayette, a hero of the American Revolution. Construction of the Verrazzano–Narrows Bridge required the destruction of this fort in 1960. The Brooklyn-side bridge pillars now occupy the fort's former foundation site.

A literary club called the "Winter Society" founded the Free Library of the Town of New Utrecht in 1894.

New Utrecht was annexed by the City of Brooklyn on July 1, 1894. It became part of the consolidated City of New York on January 1, 1898.

== After city unification ==
The area that encompassed the town center of New Utrecht is located in what is now Bensonhurst, Brooklyn. Eighty-fourth Street between Sixteenth and Eighteenth avenues approximates the main thoroughfare of the town. The rest of the town's lands are today the neighborhoods of Borough Park, which has a large Hasidic Jewish population, and Bay Ridge. In the 18th century, Bay Ridge was known as Yellow Hook. The name was changed after several outbreaks of yellow fever that struck the New York area in the 19th century.

== See also ==
- New Utrecht High School
- New Utrecht Reformed Church
- New Utrecht Avenue Line (disambiguation)
