= Chestnut Hill–Plateau Historic District =

Historic district in Virginia, United States

- U.S. National Register of Historic Places
- U.S. Historic district
- Virginia Landmarks Register
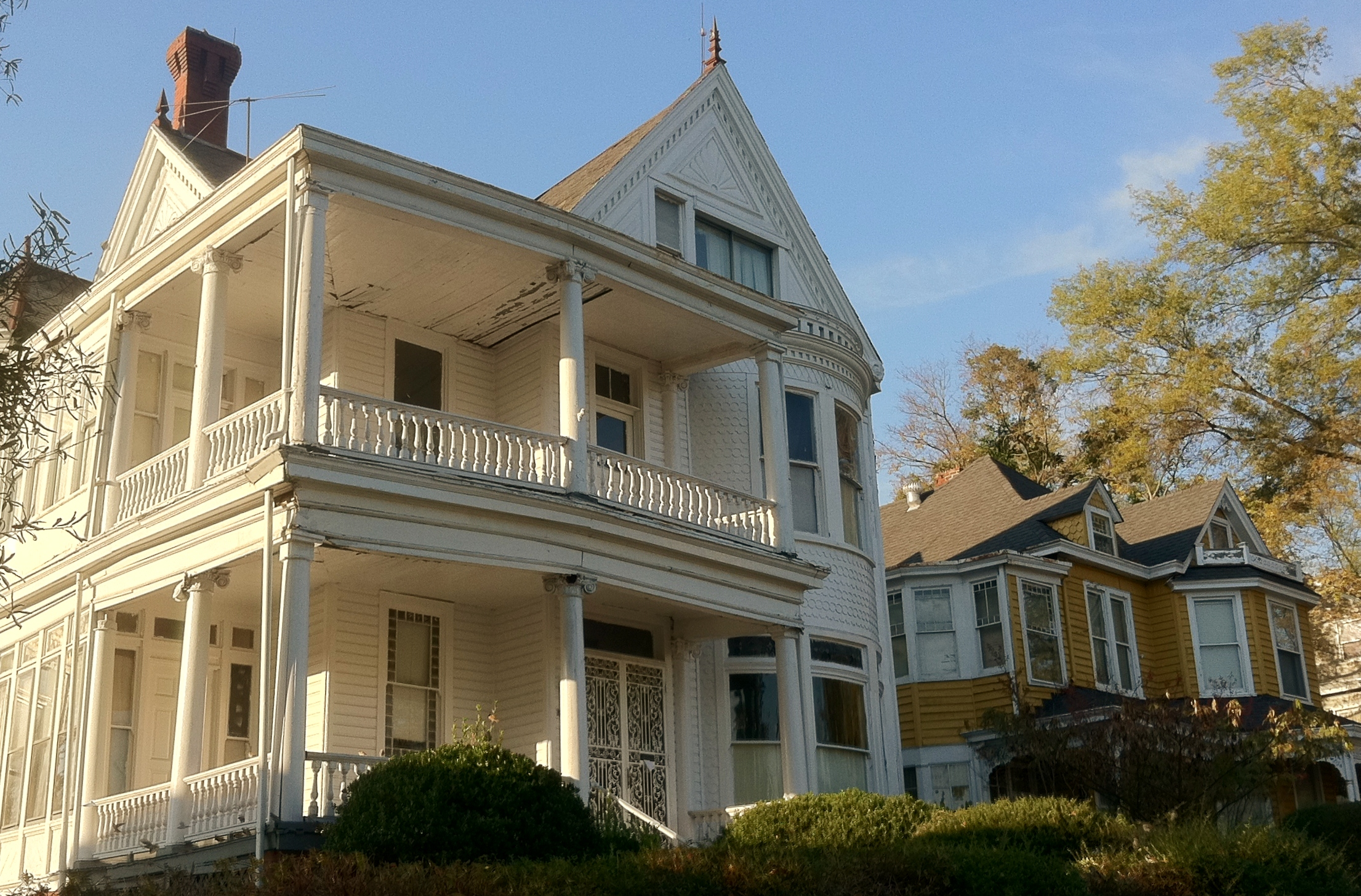
- Houses along 3rd Ave in Chestnut Hill

- Location within Virginia Location within the United States
- Location: Bounded by 1st Ave. (West), 5th Ave. (East), Trigg St. (South), Brookland Park Blvd (North)
- Coordinates: 37°33′48″N 77°25′17″W
- Area: 148 acres (60 ha)
- Architect: Multiple
- Architectural style: Late Victorian, American Foursquare
- NRHP reference No.: 02000366
- VLR No.: 127-0343

Significant dates
- Added to NRHP: April 12, 2002
- Designated VLR: December 5, 2001

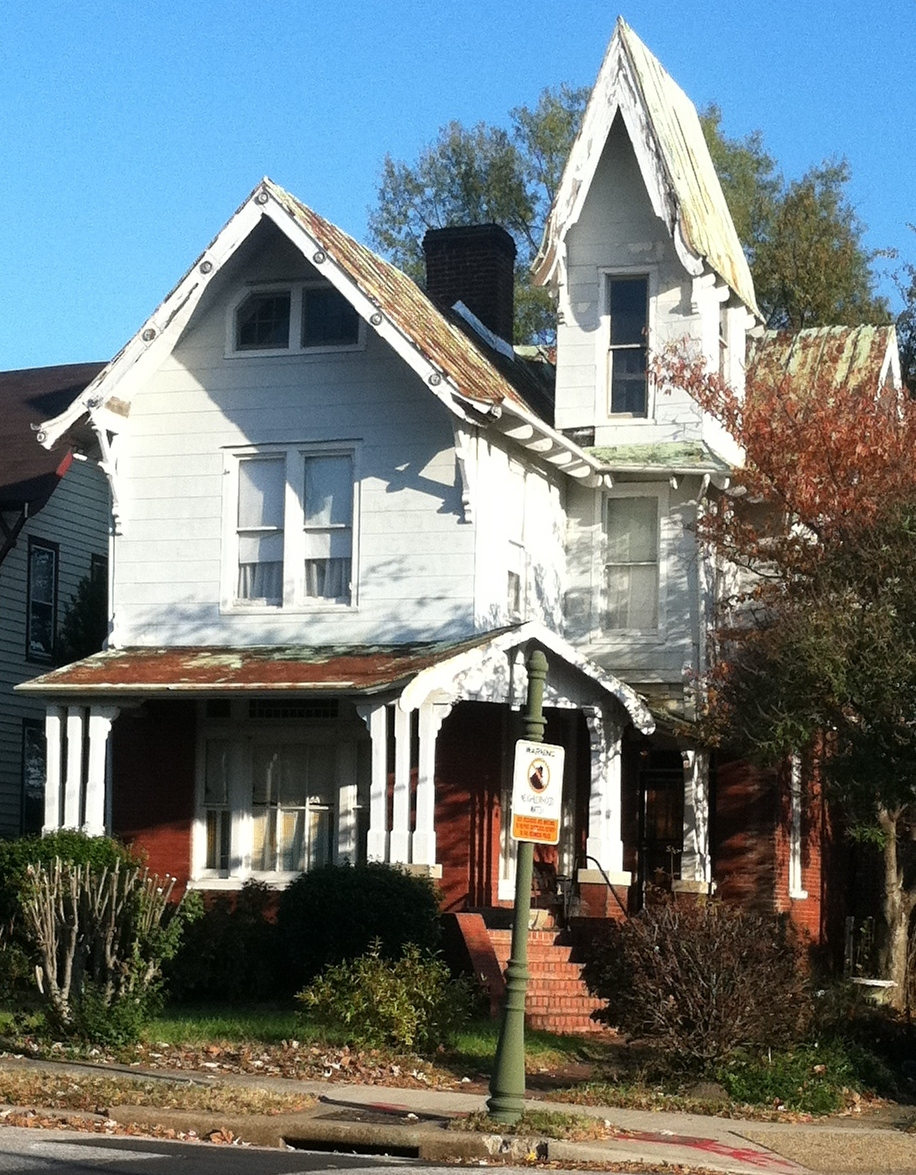
House in Chestnut Hill–Plateau historic district

The Chestnut Hill–Plateau Historic District is a historic area in the Highland Park neighborhood of Richmond, Virginia. It is also known as 'Highland Park Southern Tip' on city neighborhood maps.

It was added to the National Register of Historic Places as a historic district in 2002 as an example of a streetcar suburb with a significant collection of early 20th century homes including Queen Anne Victorian properties and American Foursquare houses.

== History ==
The land of the Chestnut Hill–Plateau historic district was once known as 'Mount Comfort' – a farm owned by a Richmonder named Samuel DuVall in the 18th century. Prior to the Civil War, the land of what makes up Chestnut Hills was owned by Peter V. and Lucy Daniel. A successful Jewish baker named Adolph Dill owned what became The Plateau – the NE part of the district between Magnolia and Brookland Park Boulevard.

During the Civil War, a defensive battery for the NE approaches of the city of Richmond called Battery No. 7 was constructed around the center of the district, around the area of what is now Juniper, Willow and Spruce streets. Chickahominy Bluffs Battlefield is the nearest of the Civil War Battlefield Parks around Richmond.

In 1882, Richmond became the first city in the US with a revenue generating streetcar system. The streetcar line in Chestnut Hill was completed in 1893 and originally known as the Richmond-Henrico Railway Company, operated by the Richmond and Manchester Railway Company. The presence of readily available transportation opened up the possibility of developing the northern suburbs.

In 1889 the suburb was platted and in 1891 the 5th Street viaduct was built which connected the area with the main part of Richmond. The extension of 5th St. and the construction of the viaduct damaged and desecrated numerous graves in what is now known as the Shockoe Hill African Burying Ground. The Northside Land Improvement Company purchased the 135 acre Mount Comfort site in 1889. There were a few structures standing on the property at the time. Around the same time, the 150 acre Highland Park development was founded to the north of Chestnut Hill. The Northside Land Improvement Company dissolved and sold the land to the Northside Land Company for $150,000. The principals were J. M. Fourqurean, a dry-goods merchant and N.V. Randolph.

Some of the ornate Queen Anne Victorians built along the southern end of 4th Avenue were built by real estate speculators to entice buyers around the 1890s. Amenities, such as the church on 3rd Avenue, were also developed around this time. The Northside Baptist Church was organized at a town hall meeting in Chestnut Hill in 1907. Services were held in the town hall for about a year before a substantial Gothic Revival-style building was completed at the comer of Third Avenue and Victor Street, in the area known as the Plateau. Today it is the home of Fifth Street [Baptist Church]. Saint Elizabeth's Roman Catholic Church was established in 1923.

Many of the houses standing in the district take the form of the Foursquare house, with a simple two-story form and its Craftsman-style detailing. Many houses were constructed in small groups as speculative developments intended to be sold to lower middle-income home-buyers. These were constructed between 1910 and 1930. The form and the decorative details were based on magazines and designs from catalog homes such as the Sears homes.

The Plateau was originally a fruit-tree nursery owned by A. F. Mosby, who developed it in 1908. It served as a continuation of the Chestnut Hill street grid.

In 1942, almost all the residents of Highland Park signed a pledge not to be the first homeowner on the block to sell to a black buyer. The racial transformation did not happen until the mid-1960s, but when it did the process was sudden. Black homeowners replaced whites, until by 1970, about 70% of the properties had changed hands. By the late 1970s very few white residents were left. According to a 1978 news story, some real estate salesmen played on racial fears and persuaded some white owners to sell their homes at low prices. The real estate agents then sold-or rented them to black residents at a substantial profit.

Since the 1970s, Chestnut Hill–Plateau has suffered from problems familiar to other older inner city neighborhoods. Crime, declining population, and a deteriorating housing stock kept property values low and most houses from being maintained or restored. The neighborhood has been hit particularly hard by the decline in the US housing market since 2007.

Renovation groups such as ACORN are working to preserve Chestnut Hill–Plateau.

== Contributing properties ==
The historic district comprises 659 contributing and 83 non-contributing structures.
