= 86th Street Line (Brooklyn) =

Former streetcar line in Brooklyn, New York

Overview
- Status: Demolished
- Line number: 34
- Locale: Bensonhurst
- Termini: 65th Street Terminal; Coney Island–Stillwell Avenue
- Stations: 35

Service
- Type: Streetcar
- System: B&QT

History
- Opened: 1894
- Closed: August 12, 1948

Technical
- Electrification: Yes

The 86th Street Line or Streetcar Line #31 was a streetcar line in Brooklyn, New York City, United States, mostly running along Bath Avenue and other streets between Coney Island and Sunset Park. Built by the Brooklyn and Queens Transit Corporation as a Streetcar line this route has now been entirely replaced by the B1 and B64 buses.

== History ==
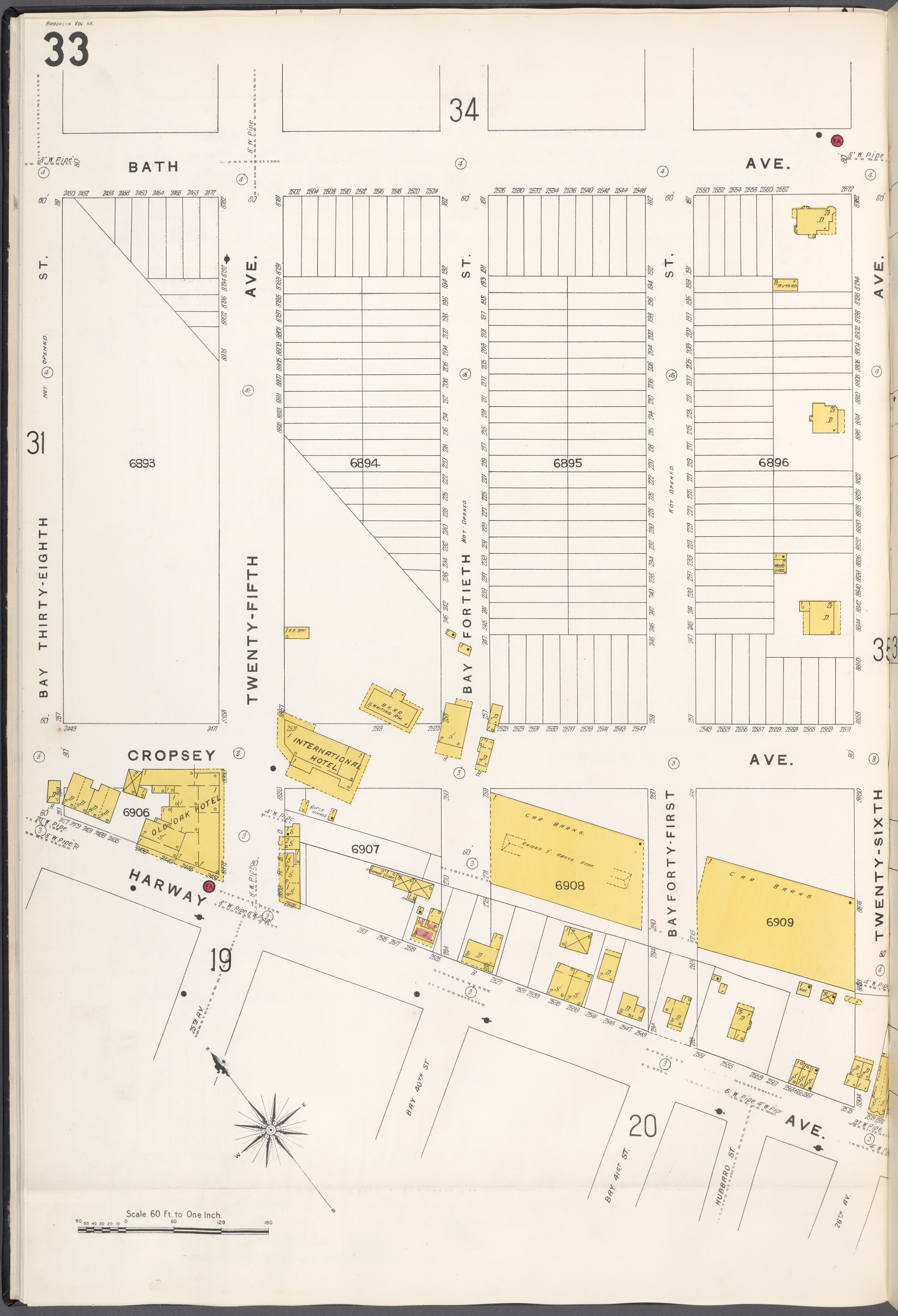
1906 atlas of Gravesend showing the 86th Street Line's main storage depot

The streetcar line was built by the Nassau Electric Railroad in 1894 to make more profits for the company. The company was later leased by the Brooklyn-Manhattan Transit Corporation. In 1929 the company made a subsidiary company, the Brooklyn and Queens Transit Corporation, to run multiple Streetcar lines one of which was the 86th Streetcar Line. The line ran entirely on surface level except for the northern terminal where it went onto an island platform. The 86th Streetcar Line had connections to multiple lines including the Bay Ridge Line, West End Line and the Fifth Avenue Line. In 1930, new tracks were made that split from the West End Line at 24th Avenue and went onto a right of way path used by trolleys to get to the Unionville Depot and onto Cropsey Avenue. The 86th Street line would then later merge back with the West End Line at the intersection of Cropsey and Stillwell avenue. The line closed on August 12, 1948, and was demolished some time later.

== Pre-1930 Stations list ==
Neighborhood	Station	Type	Tracks	Services	Opened	Transfers and notes
Bay Ridge
Bay Ridge	65th Street Terminal Station	local	all	86th Street Line	1894	Demolished 1948
Bay Ridge	Ramp down from elevated station					
Bay Ridge	67th Street	local	all	86th Street Line	1894	Demolished 1948
Bay Ridge	Bay Ridge Avenue	local	all	86th Street Line	1894	Transfer to Bay Ridge Avenue line
Bay Ridge	4th Avenue	local	all	86th Street Line	1894	Demolished 1948
Bay Ridge	5th Avenue	local	all	86th Street Line	1894	Demolished 1948
Bay Ridge	72nd Street	local	all	86th Street Line	1894	Demolished 1948
Bay Ridge	Bay Ridge Parkway	local	all	86th Street Line	1894	Demolished 1948
Bay Ridge	77th Street	local	all	86th Street Line	1894	Demolished 1948
Bay Ridge	80th Street	local	all	86th Street Line	1894	Demolished 1948
Bay Ridge	83rd Street	local	all	86th Street Line	1894	Demolished 1948
Bay Ridge	Fifth Avenue	local	all	86th Street Line	1894	Demolished 1948
Bay Ridge	Fort Hamilton Parkway	local	all	86th Street Line	1894	Demolished 1948
Dyker Heights
Dyker Heights	7th Avenue	local	all	86th Street Line	1894	Demolished 1948
Dyker Heights	12th Avenue	local	all	86th Street Line	1894	Demolished 1948
Dyker Heights	14th Avenue-86th Street	local	all	86th Street Line	1894	Demolished 1948
Dyker Heights	Benson Avenue	local	all	86th Street Line	1894	Demolished 1948
Dyker Heights	14th Avenue	local	all	86th Street Line	1894	Demolished 1948
Bath Beach
Bath Beach	15th Avenue	local	all	86th Street Line	1894	Demolished 1948
Bath Beach	16th Avenue	local	all	86th Street Line	1894	Demolished 1948
Bath Beach	17th Avenue	local	all	86th Street Line	1894	Demolished 1948
Bath Beach	Tracks Merge at Bay 19th Street with the West End Line					
Bath Beach	Bay 18th Street	local	all	86th Street Line	1894	Connections to the West End Line surface
Bath Beach	20th Avenue	local	all	86th Street Line	1894	Connections to the West End Line surface
Bath Beach	21st Avenue	local	all	86th Street Line	1894	Connections to the West End Line surface
Bath Beach	Bay Parkway	local	all	86th Street Line	1894	Connections to the West End Line surface
Bath Beach	23rd Avenue	local	all	86th Street Line	1894	Connections to the West End Line surface
Bath Beach	24th Avenue	local	all	86th Street Line	1894	Connections to the West End Line surface
Bath Beach	25th Avenue	local	all	86th Street Line	1894	Connections to the West End Line surface
Bath Beach	Track Splits to Unionville Depot					
Bath Beach	Bay 41st Street	local	all	86th Street Line	1894	Connections to the West End Line surface
Bath Beach	Bay 44th Street	local	all	86th Street Line	1894	Connections to the West End Line surface
Gravesend
Gravesend	28th Avenue	local	all	86th Street Line	1894	Connections to the West End Line surface
Gravesend	Harway Avenue	local	all	86th Street Line	1894	Demolished 1948
Gravesend	Avenue Z	local	all	86th Street Line	1894	Demolished 1948
Coney Island
Coney Island	Neptune Avenue	local	all	86th Street Line	1894	Demolished 1948
Coney Island	Stillwell Avenue	local	all	86th Street Line	1894	Connections to the West End Line surface, Sea Gate, Norton's Point and Sea Beach Line (As of 1948)
