= View of Volterra =

Painting by Jean-Baptiste-Camille Corot

- Vue de Volterra (French)
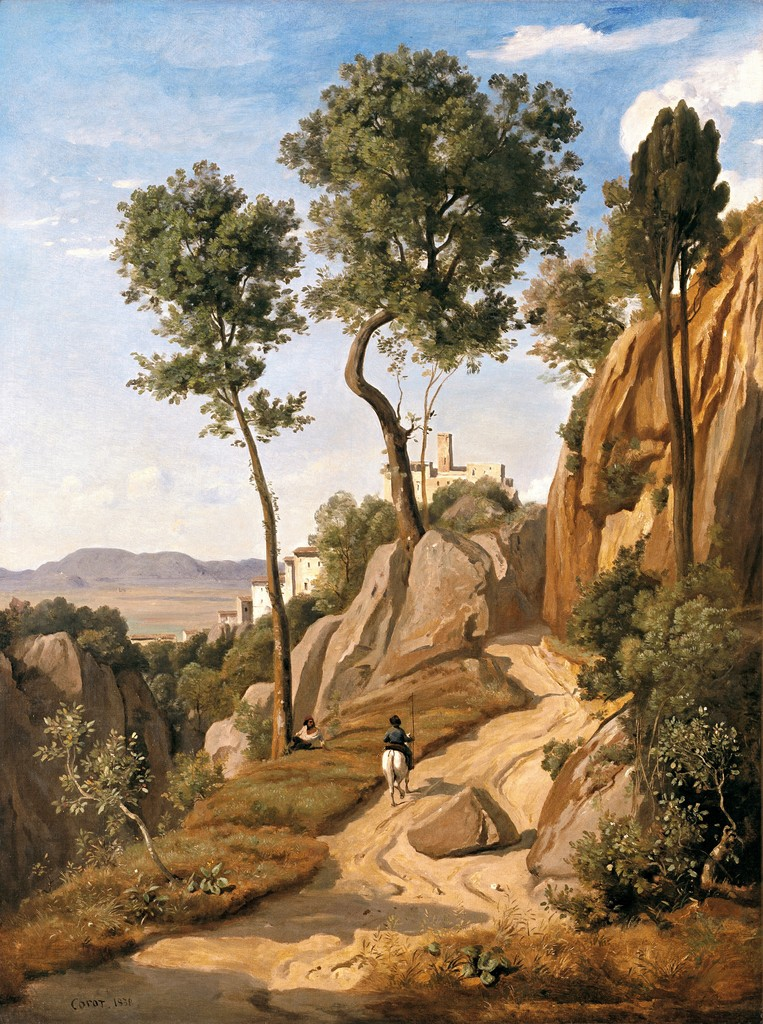
- Artist: Jean-Baptiste-Camille Corot
- Year: 1838
- Medium: oil on canvas
- Dimensions: 32.2 x 24.4 cm (62-5/8 x 47 in.)
- Location: Timken Museum of Art, San Diego

View of Volterra is an oil painting on canvas by French artist Jean-Baptiste-Camille Corot, created in 1838. It is held at the Timken Museum of Art, in San Diego.

== History and description ==
Corot visited Italy for the second time in 1834, spending then a month in Volterra, a town southwest of Florence. He did at least five oil sketches of the town, during this staying. After returning to Paris, he used these sketches to create two larger paintings of Volterra. The current painting only depicts a view of the town, he directs more attention to the light and the countryside nearby. The painting is believed to be more result of his personal recollections than the depiction of a specific place.
