= Portrait of a Man (Hals) =

Painting by Frans Hals

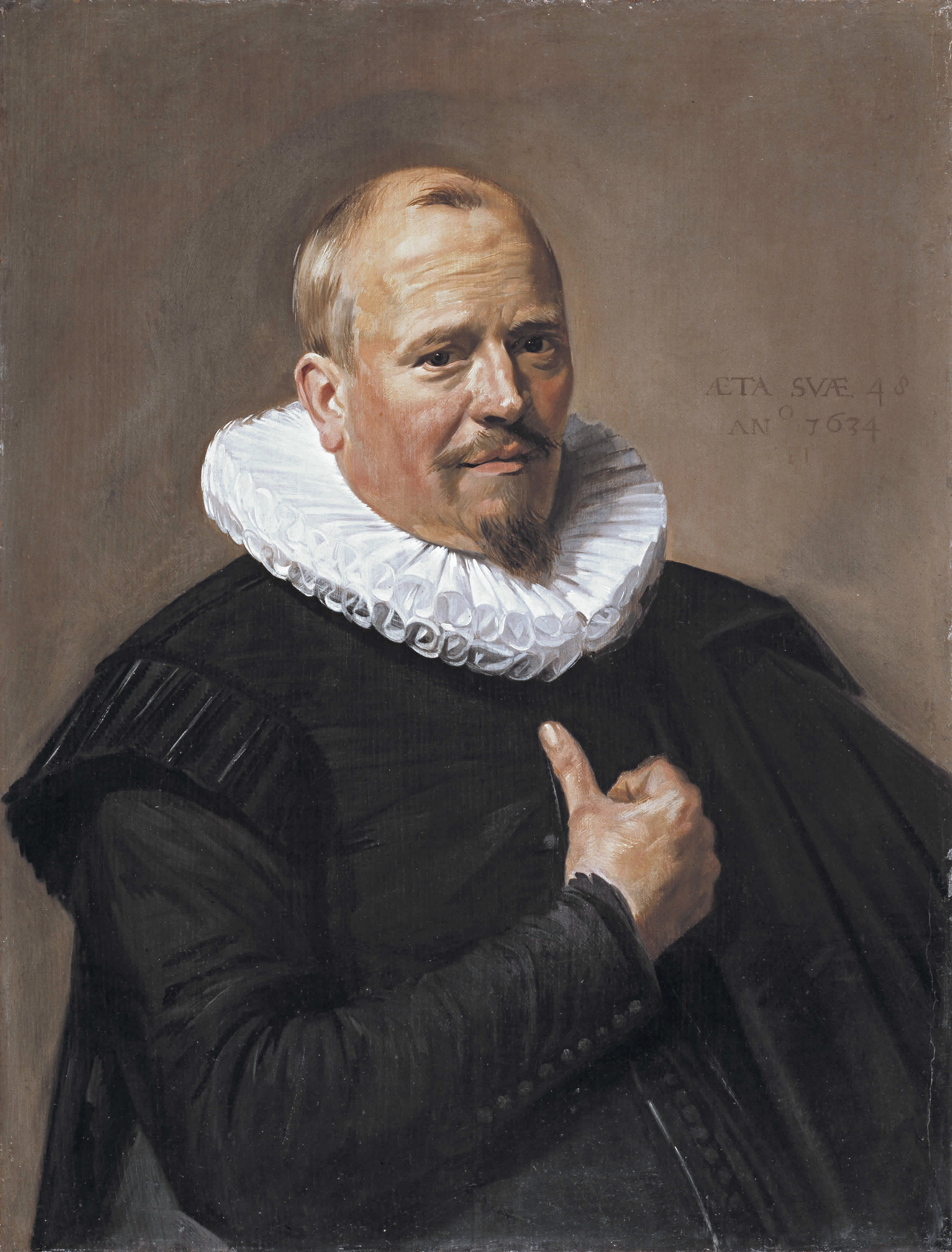
- Year: 1634
- Medium: oil on oak panel
- Location: Timken Museum of Art, San Diego, California, U.S.

Portrait of a Man is an oil an oak panel painting by Dutch artist Frans Hals, created in 1634. It is held at the Timken Museum of Art, in San Diego. It depicts an unidentified man of the upper classes, which can be deduced by his clothing, with his right hand on his chest, and holding his thumb high.

== See also ==
- List of paintings by Frans Hals
