= A Seaport at Sunset =

Painting by Claude Joseph Vernet

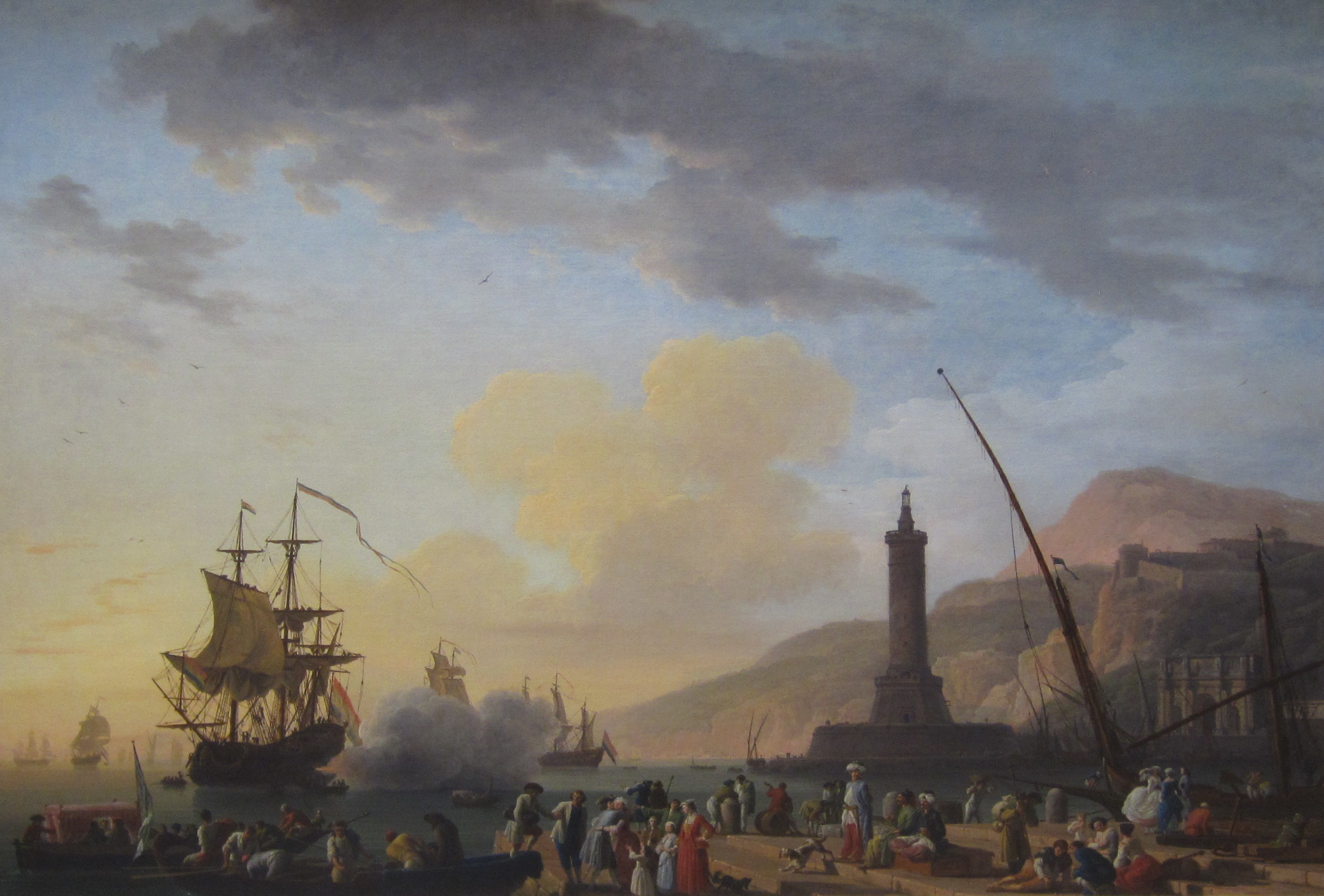
- Artist: Claude-Joseph Vernet
- Year: 1749
- Medium: oil on canvas
- Dimensions: 114 cm × 164.1 cm (45 in × 64.6 in)
- Location: Timken Museum of Art, San Diego

A Seaport at Sunset is a 1749 oil painting on canvas by the French artist Claude-Joseph Vernet. It is held at the Timken Museum of Art, in San Diego.

== Description ==
It depicts a sea port, and presumably a war scene. A lightouse is visible, at the center right, while several people are on land, and a number of ships on sea, engaged on combat, with cannons smoke visible, can be seen at the left.
