= Marriott Marquis San Diego Marina =

Hotel in San Diego, California

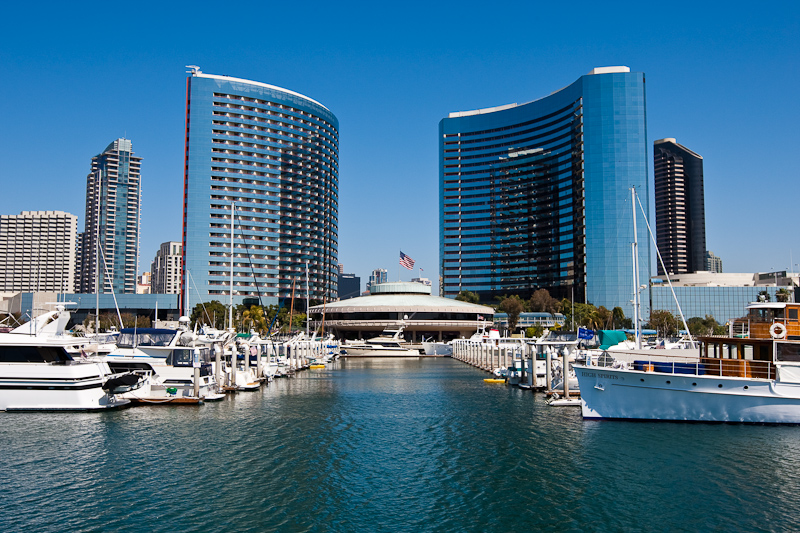
- Interactive map of the Marriott Marquis San Diego Marina area

General information
- Type: Hotel
- Location: 333 West Harbor Dr. San Diego, California 92101
- Coordinates: 32°42′29″N 117°09′56″W
- Completed: 1984
- Owner: Host Hotels & Resorts
- Operator: Marriott Hotels & Resorts

Height
- Antenna spire: None
- Roof: 361 ft (110 m)

Technical details
- Floor count: 25

Design and construction
- Architects: Welton Becket and Associates
- Developer: Doug Manchester

Marriott Marquis San Diego Marina is a hotel in San Diego, California. In the Marina district of downtown San Diego, the hotel is composed of two towers of equal height. The two towers are the 20th tallest buildings in San Diego and are a prominent fixture in the city's skyline. The 25-story towers have a height of 361 ft (110 m) and contain 1,362 rooms. The hotel is affiliated with Marriott Hotels & Resorts.

== History ==
The hotel was designed by Welton Becket and Associates, and constructed by developer Doug Manchester. The 681-room North Tower opened in April 1984 as the Inter-Continental San Diego. The hotel faced severe financial difficulties in its early years, and Marriott International assumed management in September 1987, with the hotel renamed the San Diego Marriott Hotel and Marina. The $90 million 683-room South Tower opened in December 1987, doubling the hotel's size and making it the city's largest hotel at the time. The addition was built in anticipation of the adjacent San Diego Convention Center, which opened two years behind schedule, in 1989. The first tower was designed by architect C.W. Kim, then Director of Design of Hope Consulting Group. Kim's award-winning design included a matching crescent-shaped second tower but after the first tower was built, the developer changed architectural firms and the design of the second tower.

In 2008 Manchester sold the property to Host Hotels & Resorts. In 2011, the hotel was renamed the San Diego Marriott Marquis & Marina. In 2014, Marriott Hall, its largest meeting facility, was expanded to 171,000 square feet of LEED Silver-certified meeting space.

== Marina ==
The marina is operated by Marriott in concert with the San Diego Port Authority. Its 450 slips accommodate vessels between 25 and 150 feet. Berthed sailors are eligible for all hotel amenities delivered directly to their dock.
