= Portrait of a Young Man in Armor =

Painting by Peter Paul Rubens

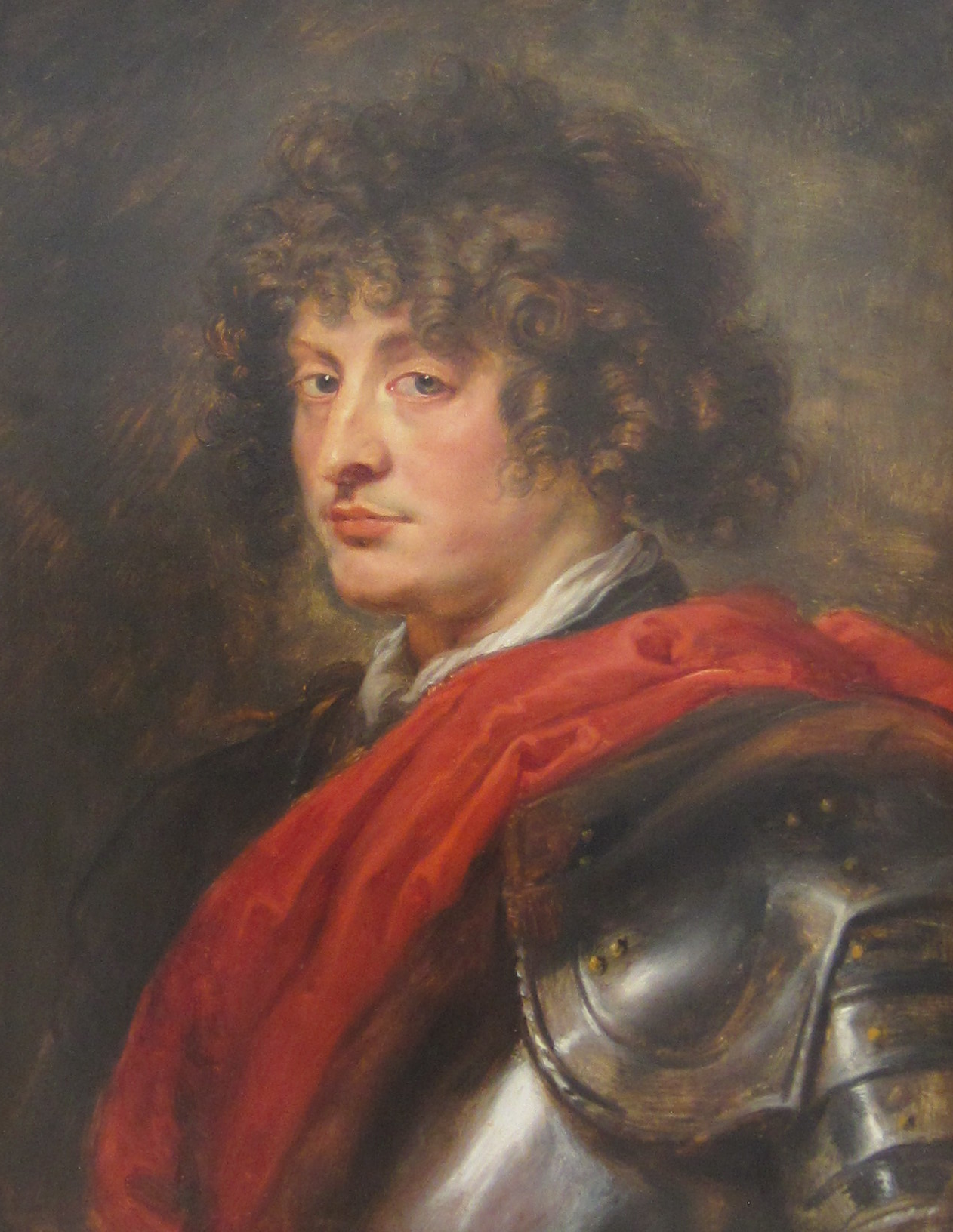
- Year: 1620
- Dimensions: 64.8 cm × 50.8 cm (25.5 in × 20.0 in)
- Location: Timken Museum of Art, San Diego, California, U.S.

Portrait of a Young Man in Armor is a c. 1620 oil painting on canvas by Peter Paul Rubens. it his held at the Timken Museum of Art, in San Diego.
