= Saint Bartholomew (Rembrandt) =

Painting by Rembrandt in San Diego, California, U.S.

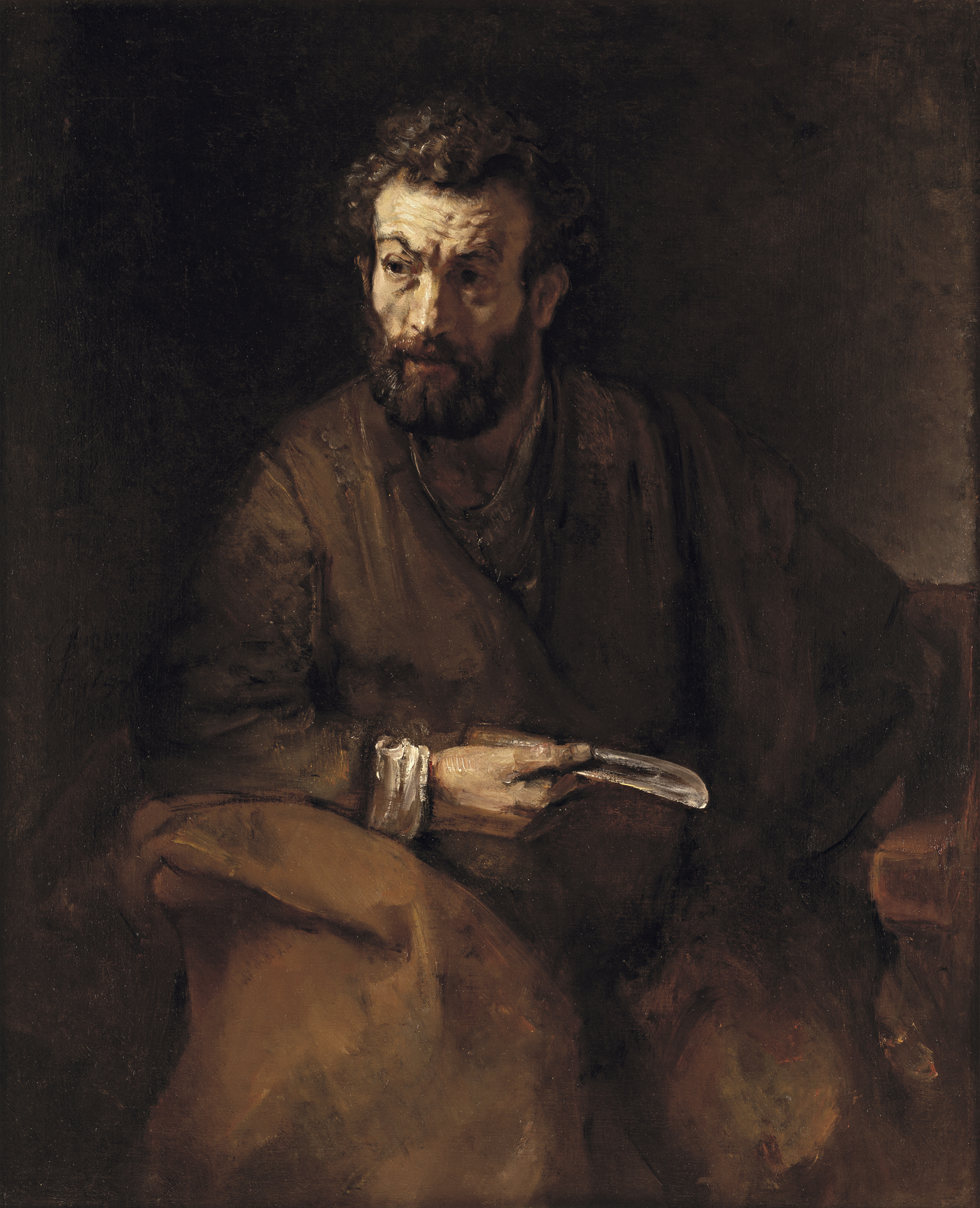
- Artist: Rembrandt
- Year: 1657
- Medium: Oil on canvas
- Dimensions: 122.7 cm × 99.5 cm (48.3 in × 39.2 in)
- Location: Timken Museum of Art, San Diego, California, U.S.

Saint Bartholomew is a 1657 oil painting on canvas by Rembrandt. It is in the Timken Museum of Art in San Diego, California, United States. It depicts Saint Bartholomew holding a butcher's knife in his right hand.

It is noteworthy that at one point a previous owner of this painting had a book painted over the butcher's knife. Conservators removed this overpaint in 1912 to reveal the original knife painted by Rembrandt. Anne T. Woollett writes that this work, along with Rembrandt's other painting of Saint Bartholomew held in the Getty, may have been seen as distasteful, which would explain the overpaint.

== See also ==
- List of paintings by Rembrandt
