= Parable of the Sower (Bruegel) =

Painting by Pieter Bruegel the Elder

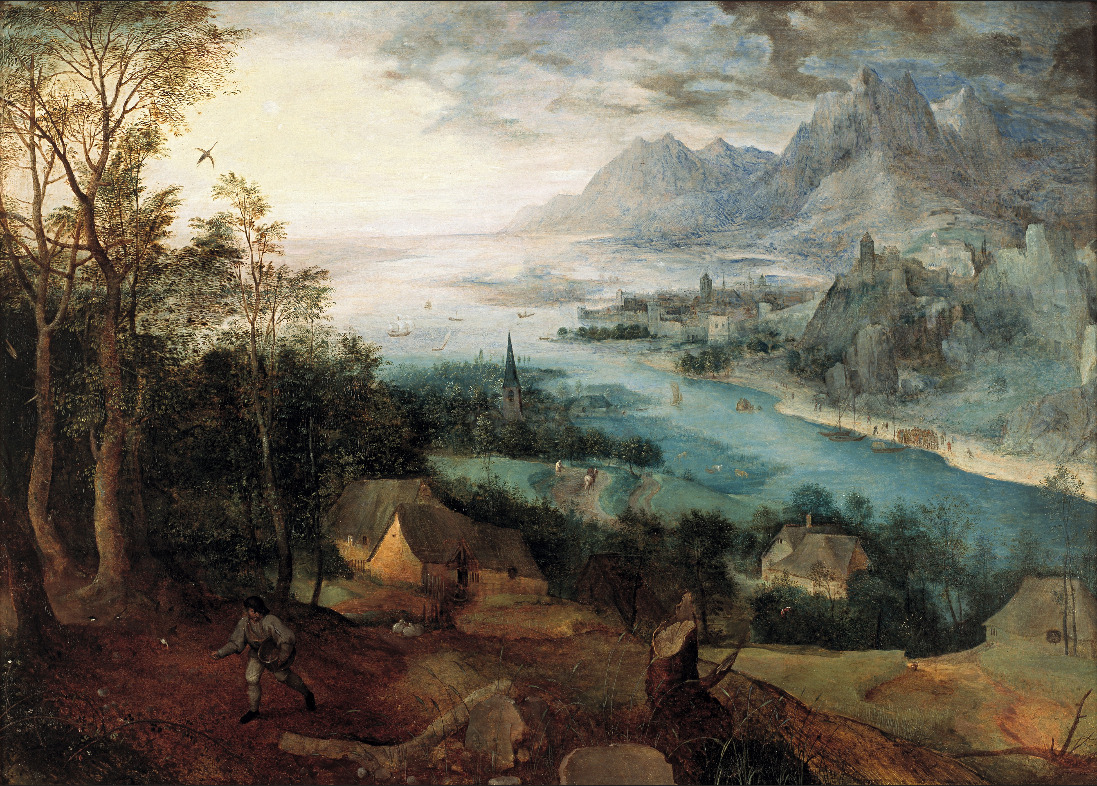
- Artist: Pieter Bruegel the Elder
- Year: 1557
- Medium: oil on wood panel
- Dimensions: 73.7 cm × 102.9 cm (29.0 in × 40.5 in)
- Location: Timken Museum of Art, San Diego

Parable of the Sower is a 1557 landscape painting by Dutch and Flemish painter Pieter Bruegel the Elder. It is now in the Timken Museum of Art in San Diego.

== Background ==
In 1553, Bruegel left Antwerp to study in Italy. He passed through and made sketches of the Alps on his return trip. These drawings influenced the mountains seen in the upper right background.

== Analysis ==
The painting depicts the Parable of the Sower found in the gospels of Matthew, Mark, and Luke and is among the earliest signed paintings and large-scale landscapes by Bruegel. The sower himself is seen spreading seeds in the lower left foreground. A church and a Flemish village line the river that runs from the lower right to the upper left of the painting. On the right bank of the river, near a small group of boats, Jesus is seen preaching the titular parable to a crowd.

John Wilson, executive director of the Timken Museum, finds that the painting exhibits the detail, religiosity, and human element found in Bruegel's later paintings. He explains, "Bruegel totally humanizes the spiritual nature of this religious subject matter...Little things catch your eye, like the tower of a church, the thatched hut, birds and horses."

Larry Silver of the University of Pennsylvania suggests a parallel between the significance of the painting and the meaning of the parable. He writes that the painting "uses the image of a sower, whose seeds were partly devoured by birds, partly fruitless when they fell upon stony soil or were choked by thorns, and partly successful when they found fertile soil. Brilliantly, therefore, Bruegel selected Jesus’s first parable as the subject for his own inaugural landscape painting, a work that planted the seed for his own affinity with landscape."

== See also ==
- List of paintings by Pieter Bruegel the Elder
