= C. W. Kim =

American architect (born 1938)

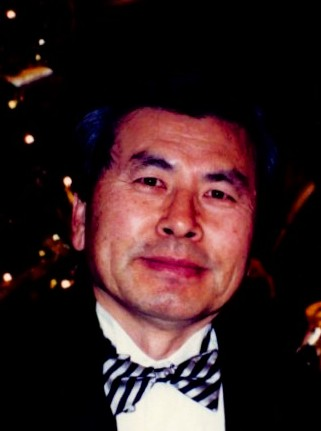
- Kim in the 1990s
- Born: Chong Wan Kim; August 6, 1938 (age 88); Namwon, then part of Japanese-occupied Korea
- Education: University of Washington, UC Berkeley
- Occupation: Architect
- Spouse: Dong Jin "Jean" Kim (m. 1966)
- Practice: Bennett, Johnson, Slenes and Smith, Sasaki & Walker, Frank L. Hope & Associates, C. W. Kim, AIA Architects & Planners, Inc.
- Buildings: First National Bank Building, Marriot Marquis, Emerald Plaza

Korean name
- Hangul: 김종완
- RR: Gim Jongwan
- MR: Kim Chongwan

Chong Wan Kim (Korean: 김종완; born August 6, 1938), better known as C. W. Kim, is a Korean-born American architect and urban planner based in San Diego. He trained in Washington state before moving to San Diego where he worked for the Hope Consulting Group, later opening his own firm. Kim's designs include San Diego's First National Bank Building, the Hotel Intercontinental, the master plan for the San Diego Convention Center district, and the Emerald Plaza. Kim was also an assistant professor at the city's NewSchool of Architecture and served on the board of United Way and the Museum of Contemporary Art San Diego.

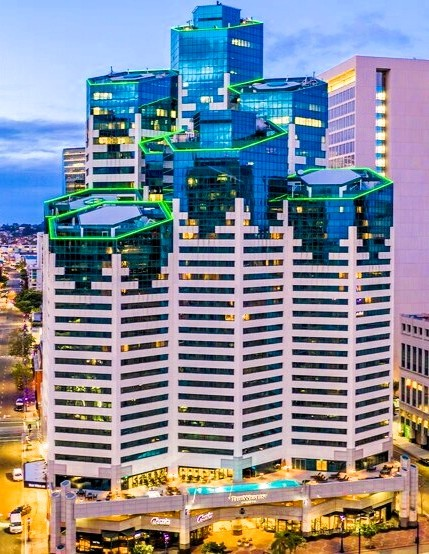
Emerald Plaza with its structure resembling a cluster of emerald crystals

== Early life and education ==
Kim was born on August 6, 1938, in Namwon in Zenrahoku Province in Japanese-occupied Korea. He was born during a period when Japan had annexed Korea and conscripted its resources for World War II. Kim was separated from his father and siblings during the Korean War. Kim won prizes in district school painting competitions, and with encouragement from his teachers and oldest brother, Kim set his sights on a career in architecture when he was 14.

Kim followed his oldest brother to the United States to attend the University of Washington. He obtained a bachelor's degree in architecture from the university in 1965. He later won a Mellon Fellowship to study at the University of California, Berkeley, where he obtained a double master's degree in architecture and city planning.

== Career ==
Kim worked as a draftsman in Washington state until 1971, when he became an associate at Bennett, Johnson, Slenes and Smith. He later worked at a number of San Francisco firms, including Sasaki & Walker and Goets, Hellenbeck & Goets.

In 1978, Kim moved to San Diego where he could have more impact, particularly on the city's skyline. He joined San Diego's oldest and largest firm, the Hope Consulting Group, which had been founded by Frank L. Hope. With this firm, Kim traveled to Saudi Arabia to design a variety of schools and commercial projects. In 1980, he began working on the San Diego skyline as Hope's director of design for the First National Bank Building (now 1 Columbia Place) and the Hotel Intercontinental (now Marriott Marquis). He also produced the master plan for the San Diego Convention Center. Kim was promoted to senior vice-president and head director of Hope in 1983.

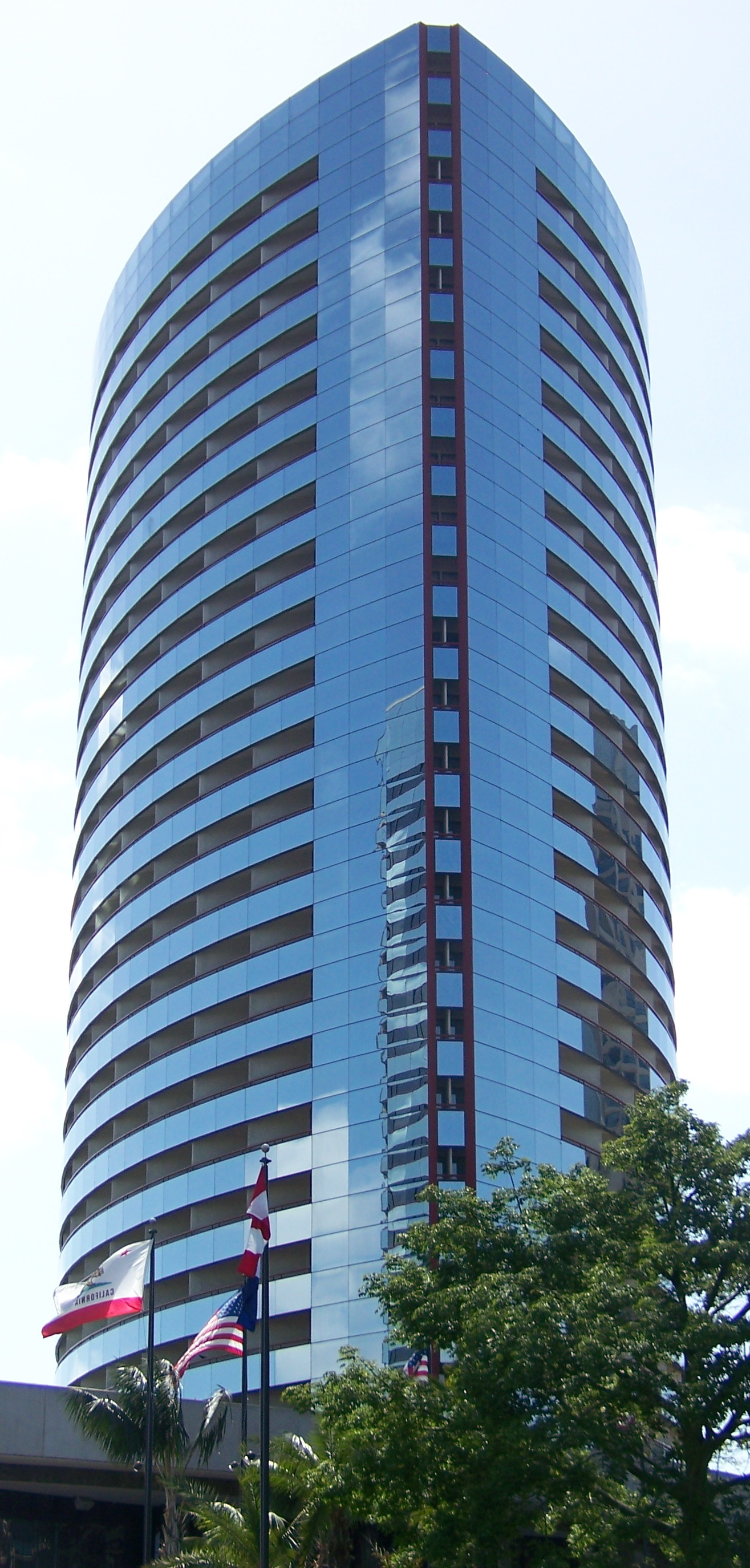
San Diego Marriott Marquis hotel, First Tower

In 1984, Kim opened his own firm, C. W. Kim, AIA Architects & Planners, Inc. There he worked on commercial and residential projects in San Diego, as well as nationally and internationally, including in Saudi Arabia, South Korea, and Central America.

Kim designed several San Diego buildings, including the Emerald Plaza, with its structure resembling a cluster of emerald crystals. Kim designed the Scripps Clinic and La Jolla Research Laboratory, San Diego's First National Bank Building, the Hotel Intercontinental, the master plan for the San Diego Convention Center district, the 100-acre (40 ha) Daley Center, the Loews Coronado Bay Resort, the Sun Dial House, and the Spinnaker Building.

Kim was an assistant professor at San Diego's NewSchool of Architecture and served on the board of the San Diego Museum of Contemporary Art and the United Way.

== Designs and planning ==
Some of Kim's notable projects and designs include:

- 1982: First National Bank Building, San Diego (now known as 1 Columbia Place). The building was Kim's first big downtown project. It departed from existing high-rise designs, which were box-shaped and zoned for single-use office space. To integrate the high-rise with the surrounding neighborhood, Kim used a series of landscaped terraces. A design for a structure linking the building to San Diego Convention Center never materialized after the site for the latter was moved.
- 1984: San Diego Marina District and Intercontinental Hotel (now known as Marriott Marquis). This project was the master plan for the 150-acre (61 ha) harborside site for the San Diego Convention Center, (Note: The master planned area was originally named the Embarcadero but is now designated as the Marina district. Many substantial structures were subsequently constructed on Kim's master planned area, including the 1 million square foot San Diego Convention Center, two 600-room Hyatt Hotel buildings, and a 1300-room Hilton Hotel. See Marina, San Diego) the Hotel Intercontinental, and its marina. Kim won a national competition with the design theme, "Pacific Gateway", which included matching marquis-shaped towers appearing as a gateway on the harbor to the city beyond. The first tower was built as Kim conceived it. However, the developer used a different firm and design for the second tower.
- 1988–1993: Emerald Center, San Diego (now known as Emerald Plaza). The mixed-use building resembles a cluster of emerald crystals. Kim planned and designed the complex. Although the complex appears from afar to be eight separate towers, the unique hexagonal design consists of two buildings joined by two eight-story glass atriums.
- 1989–1991: Loews Coronado Bay Resort, Coronado, California. Kim designed this mixed-use resort, convention center, and marina to blend with the surrounding low-rise neighborhood, and function as a community connected by a nautilus design. He also designed the expansion in 2000.
- 1996–2000: SKC International Headquarters and ABC Project, Covington, Georgia. Kim was the designer and project architect for the SK Group's manufacturing subsidiary in Georgia. The plan combined 39 hectares of industrial space and 380 acres of wooded land, with the buildings designed to be built in six phases. The first building, the subsidiary's office headquarters, was completed in the first phase of Kim's commission.

Some of Kim's other projects covered in publications include the following (with single years indicating the date of commencement and asterisks indicating projects not completed to date):

- 1978–1979: School of Logistic and Transportation, Taif, Saudi Arabia.
- 1980: Scripps Clinic and Research Laboratory, La Jolla, California.
- 1981: Mercy Hospital Expansion, San Diego, California.
- 1985–1989: Daley Center, San Diego, California.
- 1990–1993: The Sun Dial House, La Jolla, California.
- 1995: Wal-Chool Mountain National Park Resort, South Korea.*
- 1995–2002: Whang's OB-GYN Private Hospital, Seoul, South Korea.
- 2000: The Spinnaker Building, San Diego, California.*
- 2001: The Pacific Trade Center, Los Angeles, California.*
- 2004–2010: Oceanside Hotel, Oceanside, California.

== Honors ==
Kim has won numerous honors including a Building Owner's & Manager's Association Honor in 1993 and being named One of GoldSea's 100 Most Inspiring Asian Americans of All Time.

== Personal life ==
In 1966, C. W. Kim married Dong Jin Kim. In addition to architecture, Kim pursues oil painting, sculpture, and furniture design.
