= Doug Manchester =

American businessman (born 1942)

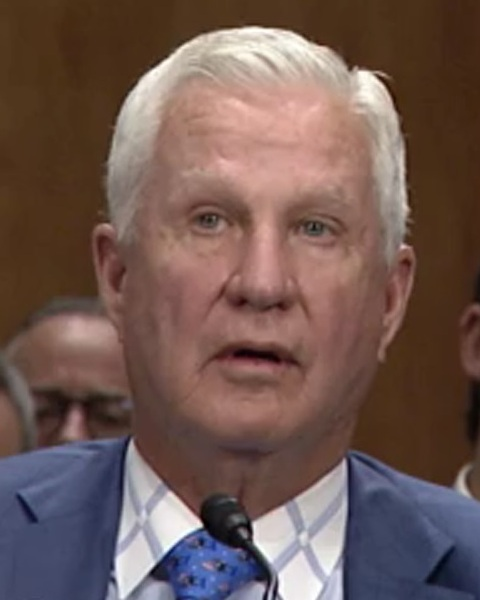
- Doug Manchester in 2019
- Born: Douglas Frederick Manchester; June 3, 1942 (age 84); Los Angeles, California, U.S.
- Education: San Diego State University (B.A.)
- Occupation: Businessman
- Political party: Republican

Douglas Frederick Manchester (born June 3, 1942) is an American businessman and philanthropist. He is the former chairman of Manchester Financial Group, past chairman and publisher of The San Diego Union-Tribune, and an unsuccessful nominee to become United States Ambassador to the Bahamas. Manchester, who prefers to be called "Papa Doug", has built some of the tallest hotels and office buildings in San Diego, including Marriott Marquis San Diego Marina and Manchester Grand Hyatt San Diego, and is credited as a driving force behind the development of the San Diego Convention Center. Manchester also built the triple 5-star Grand Del Mar Resort & Spa, which was sold to Fairmont Hotels & Resorts in 2015, and he maintains a minority ownership. Manchester also built the Torrey Executive Centre, Manchester Financial Building, Whitetail Lodge and Golf Club, Fairmont Austin and is currently building the Manchester Pacific Gateway.

Manchester is a longtime supporter of conservative causes and Republican candidates. His financial support for a 2008 California constitutional amendment to ban gay marriage resulted in some calls for a boycott of his hotels. He was an early financial supporter of Donald Trump's 2016 presidential campaign and donated $1 million to his inauguration. His subsequent nomination as ambassador to the Bahamas was controversial and was eventually withdrawn.

== Early life and education ==
Born in Los Angeles, California, Manchester grew up in Coronado, California, and the Pacific Beach neighborhood of San Diego, where his father managed an apartment building. He attended La Jolla High School where he played football. He then went to San Diego State College (now University), where he was a member of Sigma Chi and worked as a campus representative for an insurance company. He graduated in 1965 with a B.S. in Business.

== Business activities ==
After graduating from college, Manchester went into real estate. He founded the Manchester Financial Group in 1970. Eventually he became known for developing large, upscale projects. In the 1980s, Manchester built a 27-story office tower called the Columbia Centre, now known as 1 Columbia Place, and the Inter-Continental San Diego, now known as Marriott Marquis San Diego Marina. In the 1990s, he constructed the Manchester Grand Hyatt Hotel San Diego. He subsequently sold both hotels to Host Hotels & Resorts. He also built The Fairmont Grand Del Mar luxury resort. The resort was sold to Fairmont Hotels & Resorts and investor Richard Blum in 2015.

In addition, he founded two banks, the La Jolla Bank and Trust Company (1973) and La Jolla Pacific Savings Bank (1984). Manchester built the 595-foot-tall, 1,066 room Fairmont Austin Hotel, in Austin, Texas, completed in 2018, and the Manchester Pacific Gateway, located on the waterfront in downtown San Diego.

His activities have helped to revitalize the San Diego downtown waterfront. Manchester was a major influence in persuading the city of San Diego to build the San Diego Convention Center. Manchester and his company, Manchester Financial Group, also played a major role in transforming Navy Field and San Diego's Gaslamp Quarter into tourist destinations.

In 2011, Manchester bought The San Diego Union-Tribune from Platinum Equity. In 2012, he bought the North County Times and merged it and its subsidiary, The Californian, into the Union-Tribune. In November 2013, he bought eight local weeklies in the San Diego region, which continue to be published as separate papers. In 2015, Manchester sold The San Diego Union-Tribune to Tribune Publishing Company after selling the building for redevelopment.

As of 2017, Manchester was chairman of Landmark Construction Company of San Diego; Torrey Executive Centre; M Resorts, Inc.; Manchester Fifth Avenue Financial LP; Cloverleaf Media, LLC; Manchester Foxhill LLC; Manchester Pacific Gateway, LLC; La Jolla Reserve, LLC; Manchester Grand Hotels, LP; The Grand Del Mar, LLC; Manchester 484 Prospect, LLC; and Torrey Hotel Enterprises, Ltd. He was manager of 101 MPG, LLC; MLIM Holdings, LLC, and Manchester Texas Financial Group LLC. He also had major holdings in Brookfield Asset Management, Disney, Apple, Exxon Mobil, Wal-Mart, Ford, tronc, and Pfizer. He is the sole owner of M Resorts, Inc., M Investments, LLC, Manchester Lyford Ltd, and Summit Apogee Investments. The Washington Post has noted that Manchester "has a hand in dozens of other businesses, including biotechnology, mortgage receivables, and television and movie productions."

It was reported in May 2018 that Manchester was "about to install his latest and largest implant on San Diego yet," namely the Pacific Gateway project, "a massive redevelopment of the Navy Complex at the foot of Broadway in downtown San Diego." Lori Weisberg at The San Diego Union-Tribune described it as "the single largest and costliest project in downtown San Diego history." Covering 3 million square feet and eight blocks of urban oceanfront, the project will include a 17-story Navy headquarters; three office towers, respectively 29, eight, and six stories high; a retail "paseo"; an 1100-room convention hotel; a 260-room luxury boutique hotel; a museum; a park; and a pedestrian walk along the entire length of the site.

In 2018, The Washington Post reported that during his four years as the owner of the San Diego Union-Tribune, Manchester "employed an unconventional, anachronistic management style that upended the newspaper's culture and made many female workers uncomfortable." According to the Post and the Daily Aztec, "several female staffers" came forward to claim that Manchester "required some female staffers to wear short black dresses and serve as hostesses for advertisers and other guests." John Lynch, who was chief executive of the Union-Tribune under Manchester's tenure, claimed that "one woman received a small settlement after complaining about unwanted hugs from Manchester."

== Political activities ==
Manchester is "an outspoken supporter of conservative causes". He donates to Republican candidates at both the local and national level, and once described Donald Rumsfeld as his hero. On buying the Union-Tribune he stated his intention of using the newspaper to promote conservative causes, and the paper's editorial page took on a strongly conservative tone, including the use of front-page wraparound sections to promote development projects and political candidates. The New York Times noted that Manchester seems to be using the paper as a "brochure for his special interests", citing San Diego as "a situation where moneyed interests buy papers and use them to prosecute a political and commercial agenda."

In 2008 he donated $125,000 to support signature gathering for a state constitutional amendment banning same-sex marriage. When the amendment qualified for the ballot as California Proposition 8 he also donated to the campaign in favor of it. Manchester explained his position by saying, "While I respect everyone's choice of partner, my Catholic faith and longtime affiliation with the Catholic Church leads me to believe that marriage should be between a man and a woman." His prominent support for the initiative, which was narrowly approved by voters in November 2008 but was ultimately ruled unconstitutional, led to calls by gay-rights groups for a boycott of Manchester's hotels. At his August 2017 Senate hearing about his nomination for an ambassadorship, he said that he now regrets supporting the initiative and believes that same-sex marriage should be legal. His earlier opposition to same-sex marriage, he declared, had been "a huge mistake."

From 2014-2020, Manchester supported Rep. Darrell Issa (R-CA) and San Diego Mayor Kevin Faulconer through Republican Party of San Diego County and other Political action committees. After selling the San Diego Union-Tribune newspaper, Manchester bought a 49% interest in 101 Ash St. in July 2015 which was to become San Diego’s new City Hall.

Manchester was an early supporter of Donald Trump's presidential campaign, donating $50,000 to a Trump-aligned super PAC in 2015, and was a Trump delegate to the 2016 Republican National Convention. He and his wife each donated $454,800 to Trump's 2016 campaign. Two weeks after Trump's inauguration, Manchester said that "for the first time, a true capitalist is in the White House, an incredibly smart man with a big heart and an amazing family."

In May 2017 Trump nominated Manchester to become the United States ambassador to The Bahamas, where he owns a house. It was reported in June 2017 that if Manchester was confirmed as ambassador, he would "surrender day-to-day control of his real estate and investment empire", "receive only passive investment income", and resign as chairman of several of his firms. He appeared before the Senate Committee on Foreign Relations on August 2, 2017. The committee advanced his nomination to the full Senate on September 19, 2017, but it failed to receive consideration before being returned to the President on January 3, 2018. The nomination was resubmitted on January 8, 2018. His nomination was returned to the President at the close of the 115th Congress, but was resubmitted to the 116th Congress on January 16, 2019. Manchester again appeared before the Committee on Foreign Relations on June 20, 2019. The committee considered his nomination on September 18, 2019, but did not advance it to the full Senate. President Trump withdrew Manchester's nomination on November 13, 2019. Manchester erroneously described the Bahamas as a U.S. protectorate rather than an independent country within the British Commonwealth in congressional questioning.

In late 2019, the Republican National Committee (RNC) cut all ties with Manchester after CBS News obtained emails between Manchester, Ronna McDaniel, and GOP senate staffers suggesting that Manchester might have been engaged in a pay-to-play scheme. The San Diego Union-Tribune reported in May 2021 that a federal grand jury had issued a subpoena in a criminal investigation into his nomination as ambassador, apparently focused on the RNC, McDaniel, RNC co-chair Tommy Hicks, and possibly members of Congress.

== Philanthropy ==
Manchester donated $5 million each to San Diego State University and Wake Forest University. He also made multimillion-dollar donations to the University of San Diego and The Bishop's School. When he contributed to San Diego State, the university changed the name of its Centennial Hall to Manchester Hall. It was the first time the university had changed a building name to honor an alumnus.

He sponsors the Child Abuse Prevention Foundation in San Diego County and contributes money to the Preuss School, Monarch School, Polinsky Children's Center, Southern California Boys and Girls Club, Scripps Memorial Hospital, and San Diego Diocesan Ministries. He also co-founded the San Diego Crime Commission and San Diego Port Tenants Association.

Manchester donated funds to build the maternity wing at Scripps Memorial Hospital and helped build the Cathedral Catholic High School football stadium. He is the founding chair of the Alexis de Tocqueville Society of United Way and gives money to St. Vincent de Paul, the National Conference of Christians and Jews and Billy Graham Crusade.

He is a former trustee of the University of San Diego and of Wake Forest University. He has served on the board of trustees for the Sanford Burnham Prebys Medical Discovery Institute and the San Diego Symphony.

During November 2022, Manchester donated $1 million to the 114th Anniversary Charity Ball benefiting Chadwick Center for Children and Families located in Rady Children's Hospital in San Diego.

== Personal life ==
In January 1965 he married Elizabeth "Betsy" Manchester, whom he met when both were students at San Diego State; they have five children and thirteen grandchildren. During their four decades together, according to The Washington Post, they "lived an opulent lifestyle that included multiple homes, one an $18 million mansion on the Pacific coast, as well as regular use of private jets and extensive travel." They filed for separation in 2009 and their divorce was finalized in 2013. He and divorced Russian immigrant Geniya Derzhavina were married in December 2013 and they had three children. Manchester filed for marriage dissolution in October 2019 and the couple divorced in December 2019. Manchester listed the family home, the Foxhill Estate purchased from David C. Copley in 2015, for sale in January 2020 according to The Wall Street Journal. Manchester's daughter, Sally Manchester Ricchiuti, died of an accidental fentanyl overdose in September 2020.

== Recognition ==
- Multiple buildings and facilities are named for him at Wake Forest University (Manchester Plaza, Manchester Hall), the University of San Diego (Douglas F. Manchester Executive Conference Center, Manchester Family Child Development Center, Manchester Village Apartments), and The Bishop's School (Manchester Library & Learning Center). Manchester Stadium, home field for Cathedral Catholic High School, is also named for him.
