= Manchester Grand Hyatt San Diego =

Hotel in San Diego, California

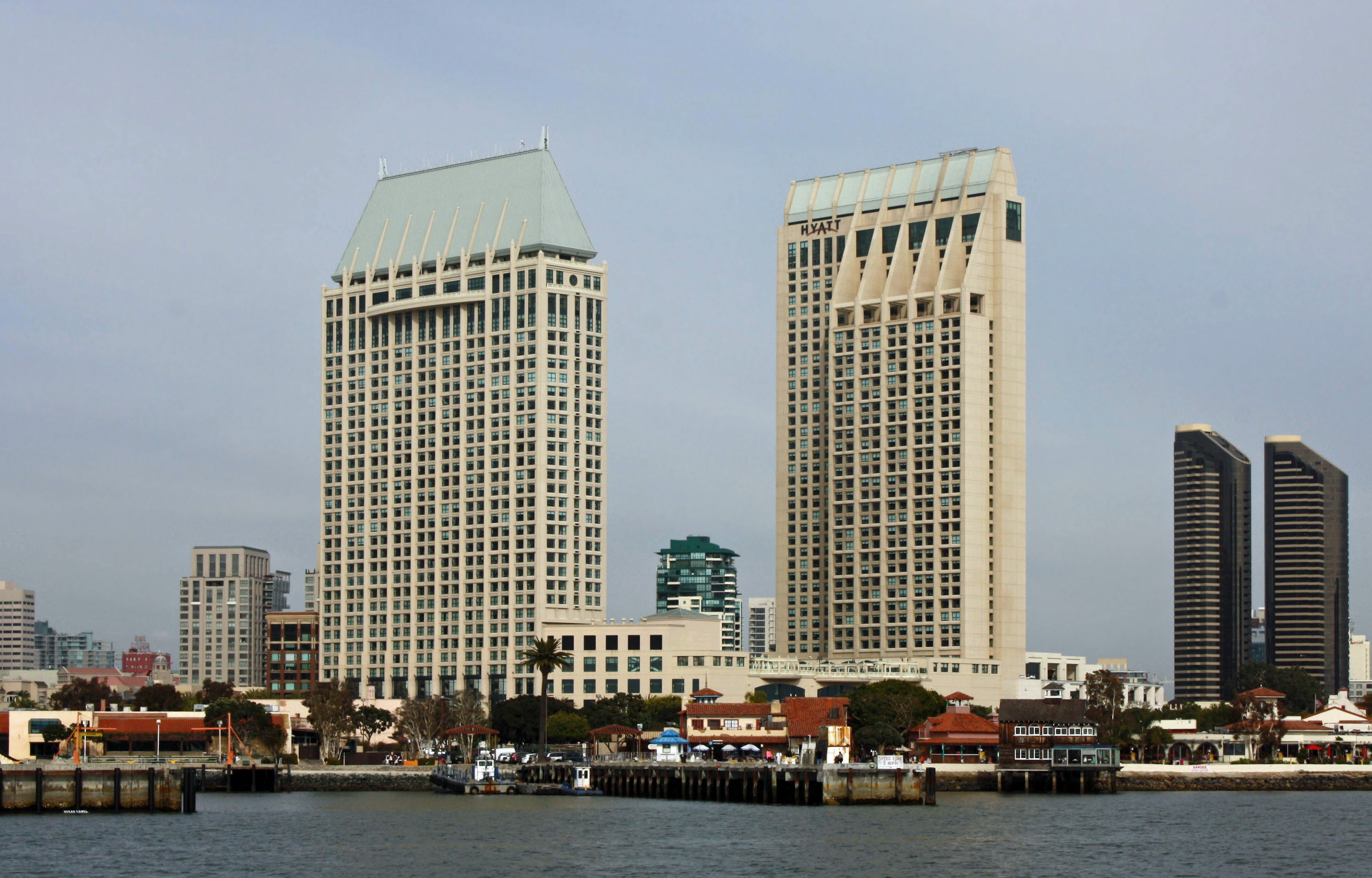
- Manchester Grand Hyatt San Diego

- Location in Central San Diego Manchester Grand Hyatt San Diego (California) Manchester Grand Hyatt San Diego (the United States)
- Hotel chain: Hyatt Hotels Corporation

General information
- Location: One Market Place; San Diego, California, United States
- Coordinates: 32.7097°N 117.1684°W
- Opening: 1992
- Owner: Host Hotels & Resorts
- Operator: Hyatt Hotels Corporation

Height
- Height: Tower I: 151.5 m (497 ft); Tower: II 135.9 m (446 ft)

Technical details
- Floor count: Tower I: 40; Tower II: 34

Design and construction
- Architect: Skidmore, Owings and Merrill
- Developer: Doug Manchester

Other information
- Number of rooms: Tower I: 875; Tower II: 750
- Number of restaurants: Sally's Seafood on the Water; Seaview Restaurant; Top of the Hyatt; Market One

Website
- http://manchester.grand.hyatt.com

Manchester Grand Hyatt San Diego is a high-rise hotel complex in San Diego, California, composed of two towers. The towers are the third- and tenth-tallest buildings in the city. Developed by Doug Manchester, and owned by Host Hotels & Resorts, the taller tower stands as the highest waterfront building on the West Coast (with 40 floors and 1,628 rooms). It is also the largest hotel in Southern California. Due to its proximity to the waterfront, as well as its amenities, the Manchester Grand Hyatt is referred to as a spa and resort.

== Description ==
The Manchester Grand Hyatt consists of two towers, the 40-story Harbor Tower built in 1992 and the 33-story Seaport Tower which was added in 2003. Starting in 2012, all of the guest rooms and suites had a complete renovation when the property was transferred to new ownership. A four-story building with a rooftop pool connects the towers to each other. The hotel's 1,628 guest rooms each have partial bay or city views, and many offer views of the Pacific Ocean.

The hotel has three bars: the Top of the Hyatt, Brew 30, and the Landing Lobby Bar. The third floor features a spa and a hair salon with its own private pool, and the fourth floor holds the general swimming pool, whirlpools/hot tubs and sun decks for all guests. Periodically, the sun decks are host to various local and/or charity events, from special yoga, fitness and dance classes, to movies under the stars and other forms of entertainment.

=== Top of the Hyatt ===
The 40th (and uppermost) floor of the Manchester Grand Hyatt is known as the "Top of the Hyatt", a bar with stunning views of surrounding San Diego, distant mountains to the east, west to Coronado, Point Loma, and the offshore Coronado Islands, and further south to the San Diego-Coronado Bay Bridge and Mexico. The bar was awarded the title of "Best Upscale Bar" by SignOnSanDiego." This is a 21+ venue after 6pm.

== Location ==
The Manchester Grand Hyatt is located on the Marina's waterfront at 1 Market Place.

== See also ==
- List of tallest buildings in San Diego
