= The Cranberry Harvest, Island of Nantucket =

1880 painting by Eastman Johnson

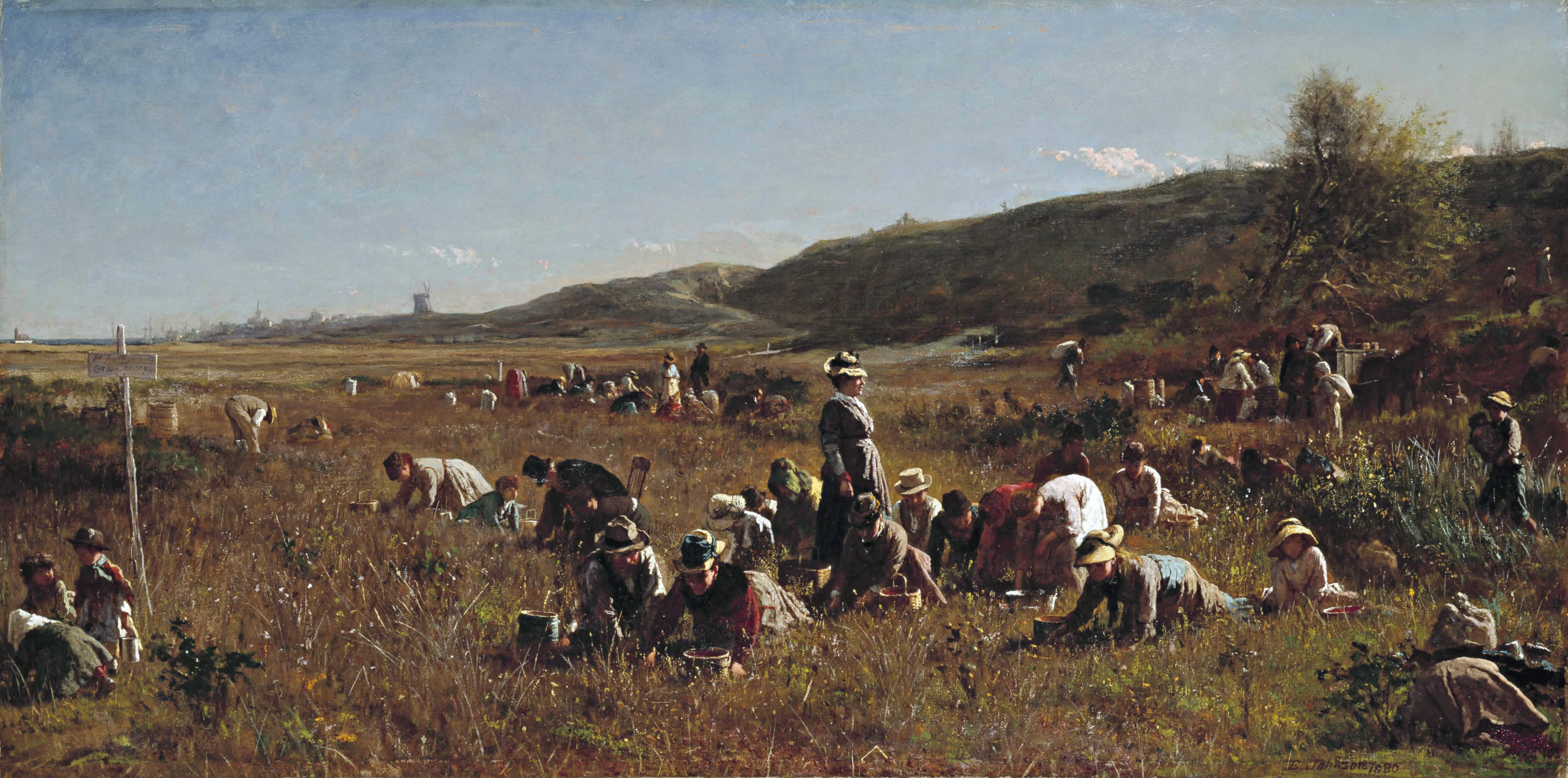
- Artist: Eastman Johnson
- Year: 1880
- Medium: oil on canvas
- Dimensions: 69.5 cm × 138.4 cm (27.4 in × 54.5 in)
- Location: Timken Museum of Art, San Diego, California
- Accession: 1972:002

The Cranberry Harvest, Island of Nantucket is an 1880 oil painting on canvas by the American artist Eastman Johnson. It is in the Timken Museum of Art, which acquired it in 1972. It depicts a large number of people, women, men and children, participating in the harvest of cranberries in the fields of the island of Nantucket, Massachusetts.
