= 1 Columbia Place =

Office building

1 Place
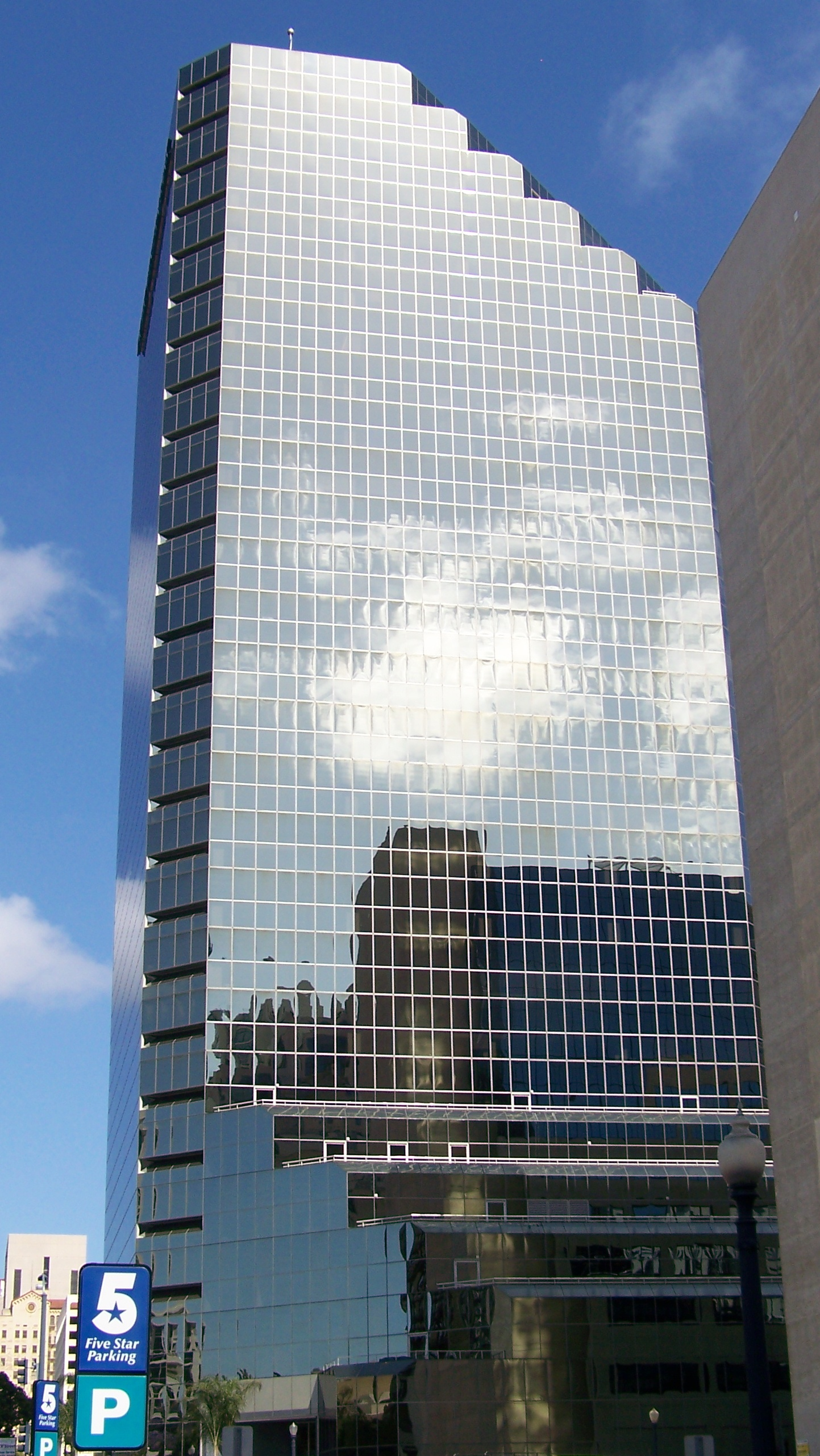

General information
- Type: Office building
- Location: 401 West A Street; San Diego, California 92101
- Coordinates: 32°43′6″N 117°10′1″W
- Completed: 1982
- Operator: Regent PM

Height
- Antenna spire: None
- Roof: 379 ft (116 m)

Technical details
- Floor count: 27

Design and construction
- Developer: Doug Manchester

1 Columbia Place (formerly Columbia Centre) is an office building in San Diego, California. It is the 18th tallest building in San Diego and a prominent fixture in the city's skyline. Atop the skyscraper is a flagpole flying the largest United States flag in the San Diego skyline.

Originally known as Columbia Centre, the building was developed by San Diego developer Doug Manchester as the headquarters of First National Bank. It was one of several major high-rise office projects completed in downtown San Diego during the early 1980s, contributing to the city's expanding central business district. In 2014, the property was renamed 1 Columbia Place as part of a major modernization and repositioning program by its then-owner, Emmes Realty Services.

It is 379 feet (116 m) high and is located in the Core district of downtown San Diego. It occupies the full block between West A Street, West B Street, Columbia Street and State Street. It has 27 stories above ground and three below ground.

== Architecture ==
The steel-and-glass building utilizes the modern architectural style and has a six-story atrium. Built in 1982 by developer Doug Manchester, it was renovated in 1993 and 1997. In 2004 it was designated an Energy Star building. The building was designed by architect C.W. Kim, while he was Director of Design for Hope Consulting Group.

Architect C. W. Kim designed the building with a distinctive stepped massing that departed from the conventional rectangular office towers common in San Diego at the time. The terraced form was intended to visually reduce the scale of the high-rise while incorporating landscaped setbacks that connected the structure more closely to the surrounding urban environment. Kim also envisioned the building as part of a broader redevelopment of the downtown waterfront, although some elements of the original master plan, including a proposed pedestrian connection to the future San Diego Convention Center, were never constructed

== Sustainability ==
The property was awarded the ENERGY STAR certification and the LEED Gold certification.
