= Frank L. Hope & Associates =

Defunct architecture firm based in San Diego, California

Hope Design Group Frank L. Hope & Associates (former) Hope Consulting Group (former)
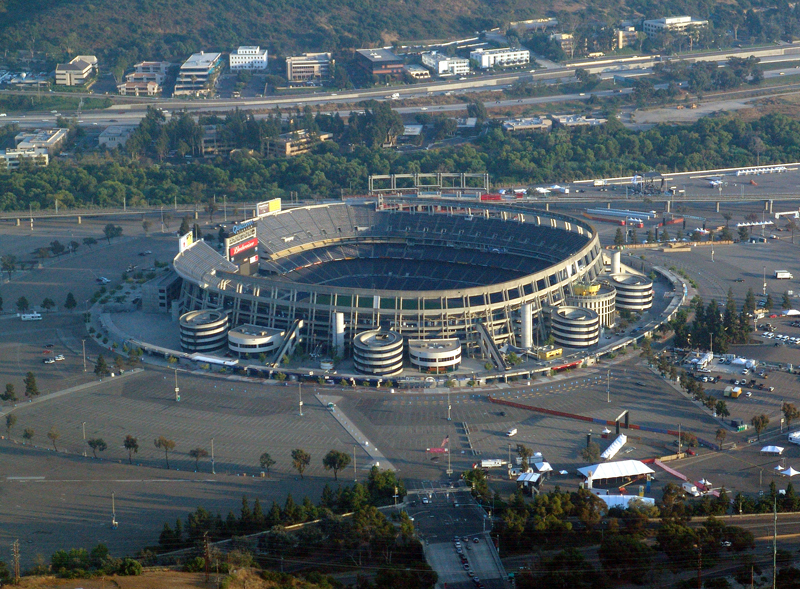
- Exterior of San Diego Stadium in 2005, prior to its 2021 demolition and rebuild

Practice information
- Founders: Frank Hope Sr
- Founded: 1928
- Dissolved: 1993
- Location: San Diego (satellite offices in San Francisco and Saudi Arabia)

Significant works and honors
- Buildings: Timken Museum of Art
- Projects: San Diego Stadium, San Diego City College

Frank L. Hope & Associates, later known as the Hope Consulting Group and then the Hope Design Group, was an architecture firm based in San Diego, California. It is best known for designing San Diego Stadium, which was awarded by the American Institute of Architects. The firm also designed 1 Columbia Place in downtown San Diego as well as facilities at the University of California, San Diego, San Diego City College, and others. It was the oldest architectural firm in San Diego, with satellite offices in San Francisco and Saudi Arabia.

== History ==
Frank Hope Sr. founded Frank L. Hope & Associates in 1928. Prior to establishing the firm, Hope attended (but did not graduate from) the University of California, Berkeley, and the Carnegie Institute of Architecture, was employed in the design department of a ship builder during World War I, then worked for the architectural firm of Requa & Jackson.

Frank L. Hope & Associates designed houses and churches in a Mediterranean style, which he learned while at Requa & Jackson. These buildings included the Our Lady of Guadalupe Catholic Church in San Diego and the Carmelite Monastery located in Normal Heights, San Diego.

The firm later designed houses in the seaside community of Point Loma, San Diego, in the Streamline Moderne style. The largest structure designed during Frank Hope Sr.'s tenure was the Great Western Building (then known as the Home Tower), built in 1962. He retired in 1966, turning the reins over to his sons, architect Frank Hope Jr. (who would be named Fellow of the American Institute of Architects, awarded to about two percent of the AIA's membership for national architectural contributions) and structural engineer Chuck Hope.

The most notable structure designed by Frank L. Hope & Associates is San Diego Stadium, later as known as Jack Murphy Stadium and Qualcomm Stadium. Though it was a controversial structure, the stadium was awarded with an AIA National Honor Award for its brutalist architecture design when it opened (the only other building in San Diego with the same honor is the Salk Institute for Biological Studies), and another in 1982 it was given a special Award of Honor by the AIA. Hope secured the contract at age 35 with no background in the design of stadiums. Gary Allen is acknowledged as the design architect of the stadium.

The firm designed buildings that are part of San Diego's downtown skyline during the city's boom in the '70s to '80s, including the east tower of the waterfront Marriott Hotel adjacent to the San Diego Convention Center and the First National Bank building. (Both buildings were designed by C.W. Kim, who soon after opened his own architectural firm. Frank Hope, Jr. considered these buildings among the best efforts under his leadership of the firm.) It also designed the headquarters of The San Diego Union-Tribune in Mission Valley, San Diego.

In the '90s, management and ownership of the company transitioned to architect F. Lee Hope (Frank Hope Jr.'s son) and civil engineer Chuck Hope Jr. (and Chuck Hope's son). However, the decade saw the company, now known as the Hope Design Group, facing increasing competition from firms outside of its home base of San Diego and outside San Diego for projects in the city. It was forced to cut its workforce. The company closed its doors in 1993.

== Selected projects ==
- San Diego Stadium
- Aquarium Museum Building, Scripps Institution of Oceanography
- Carmelite Monastery of San Diego
- Coronado Hospital
- Dana Middle School
- First National Bank building
- Home Tower
- Immaculate Conception Church, San Diego
- Marriott Hotel (East Tower), San Diego
- McGill Hall (Psychology Building), John Muir College Campus, University of California, San Diego
- Scripps Mercy Hospital, San Diego
- Sharp Mesa Vista Hospital, San Diego
- The San Diego Union-Tribune
- San Diego City College
- Timken Museum of Art
- Travelodge Headquarters, San Diego
