= Timken Museum of Art =

Art museum in San Diego, California

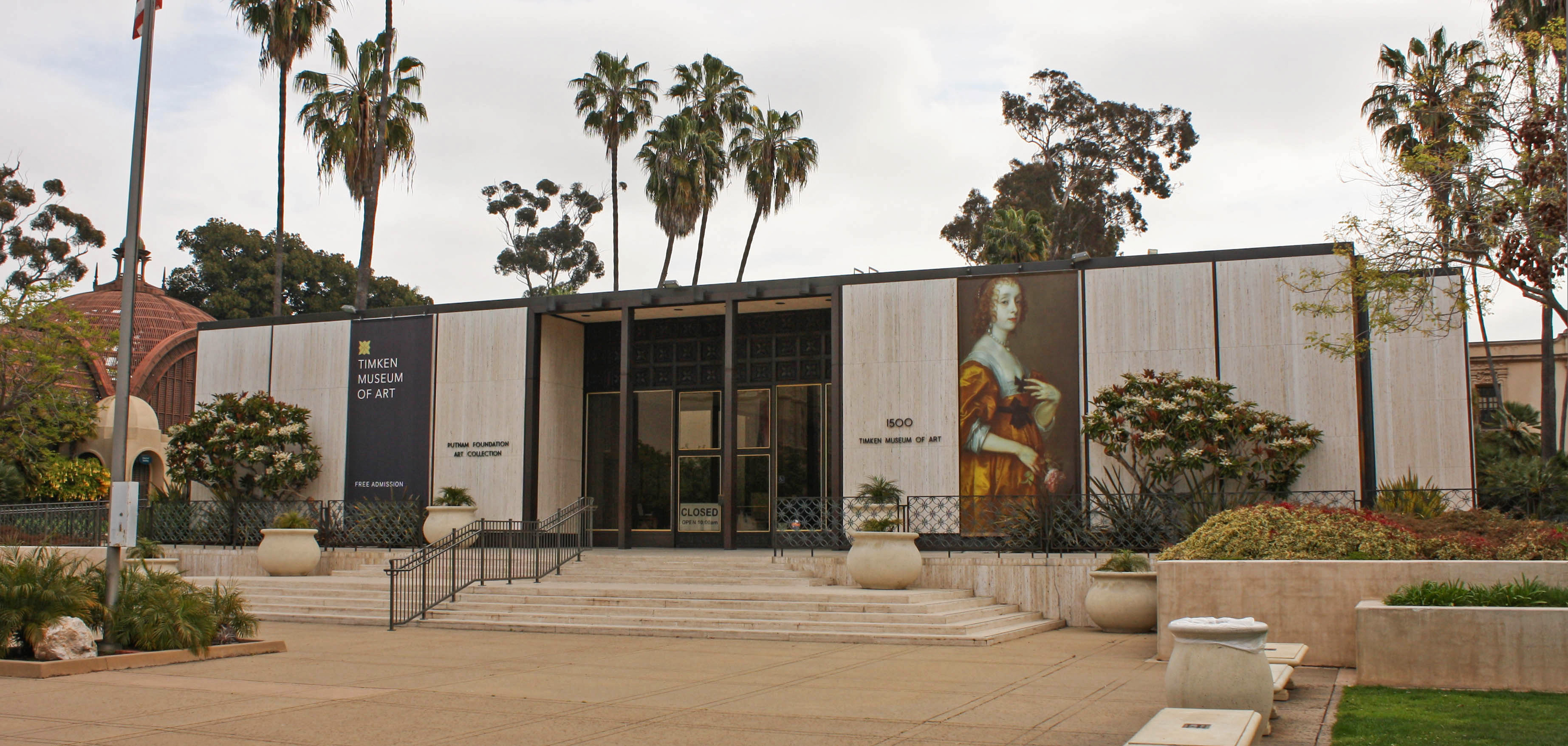
- Entrance to the Timken Museum of Art

- Location within San Diego Location within California Location within the United States
- Established: October 1965
- Location: 1500 El Prado; San Diego, California, US
- Coordinates: 32.7318°N 117.1496°W
- Type: Art museum
- Founders: Timken family, Anne and Amy Putnam
- Director: Megan Pogue
- Website: www.timkenmuseum.org

The Timken Museum of Art is a fine art museum in Balboa Park in San Diego, California, close to the San Diego Museum of Art. It was established in 1965.

== History ==
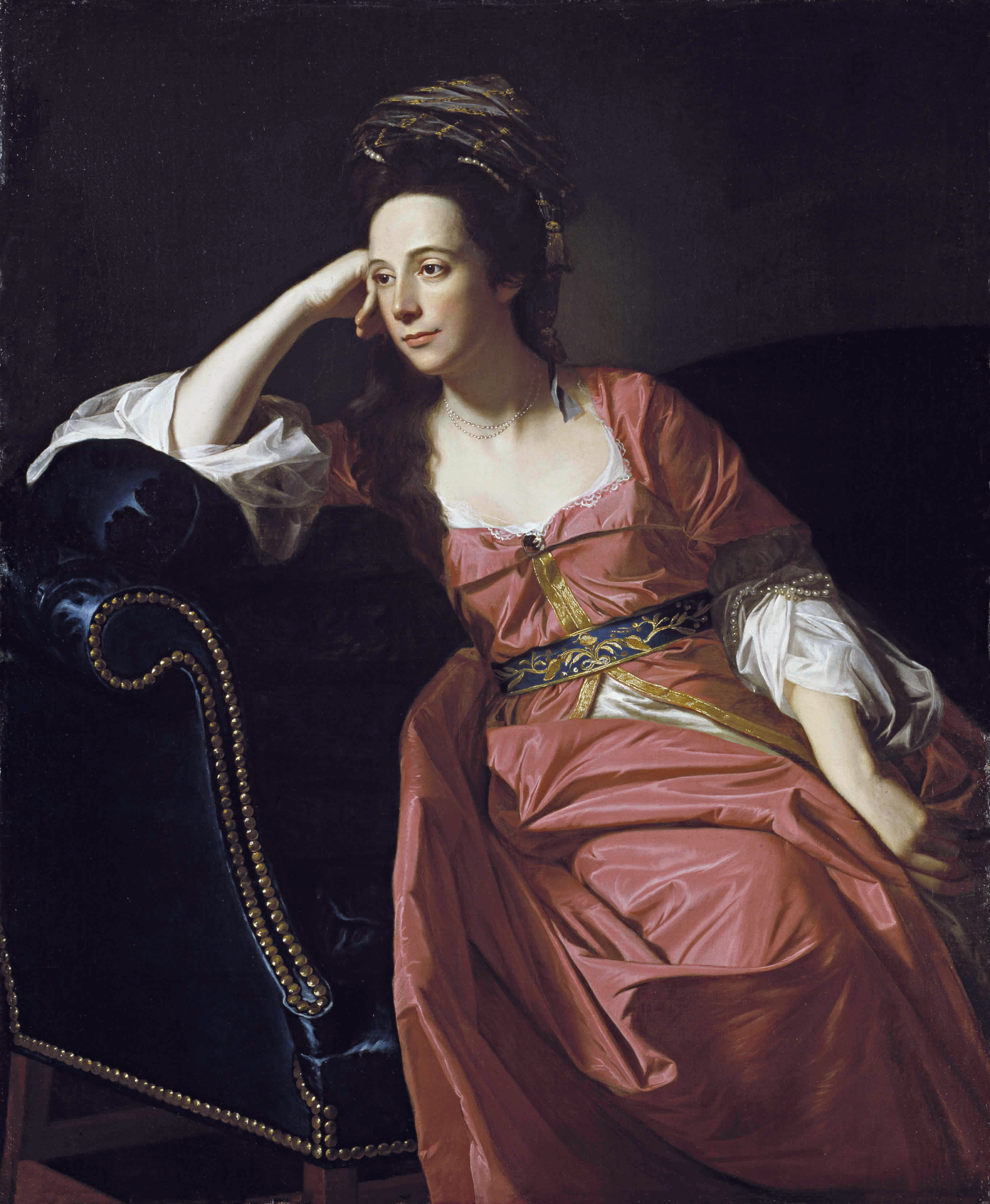
Portrait of Margaret Kemble Gage by John Singleton Copley, 1771

The groundwork for the museum was laid in 1951 when Walter Ames helped sisters Amy and Anne Putnam (nieces and heirs of Henry W. Putnam) to form the nonprofit Putnam Foundation to own and manage their art collection. The sisters had settled in San Diego in the early 20th century and made donations to the San Diego Museum of Art in its early years. At first the foundation loaned items from its collection to noteworthy museums across the United States. When the Timken Museum opened in 1965, the Putnam Foundation Collection provided its initial material and Walter Ames became its first director.

The museum building stands on the site of the former Home Economy Building, originally designed for the 1915 Panama–California Exposition and later known as the Pan-Pacific Building, the Cafe of the World, and the American Legion Building. That building was torn down in 1963 and replaced by the Timken Museum, which was designed by the architectural firm of Frank L. Hope and Associates and funded by the Timken family. The museum is a white, modern building in marble and bronze housing a five-room gallery.

Shortly after the museum opened, John Walker, of the National Gallery of Art, praised its collection, some of which had been on loan at his institution until the Timken neared completion:

It is one of the finest small museums I have ever seen...I congratulate you on the discrimination shown. You have been wise. Some cities have built large museums, and then hoped that innumerable works of art of true excellence would miraculously appear. I am afraid they won't any longer. Money is not the problem. The problem is to find pictures to buy. I can't replace those which have come to San Diego. Paintings like these are virtually unavailable at any price.

== Overview ==
The museum displays European old master paintings, sculptures, and tapestries under natural light. Supplementing the European holdings are collections of American painting and Russian icons.

Acquisitions have expanded the collection from the original 40 to 60 major works, including ones by American (Copley, Johnson, West, Cole, Bierstadt), Italian (Veronese, Guercino, and Savoldo's The Temptation of Saint Anthony), Spanish (Murillo), and French masters (Clouet, Claude, Boucher, Fragonard, David, Corot), as well as works of the Flemish and Dutch schools, including masterpieces by Pieter Brueghel the Elder, Peter Paul Rubens, Anthony van Dyck, and Frans Hals.

In 2015, in honor of the museum's 50th anniversary, the Timken acquired a Zurbarán 3/4 portrait of St. Francis in meditation. The Timken is the only San Diego museum with a Rembrandt in its permanent collection.

== Selected works ==
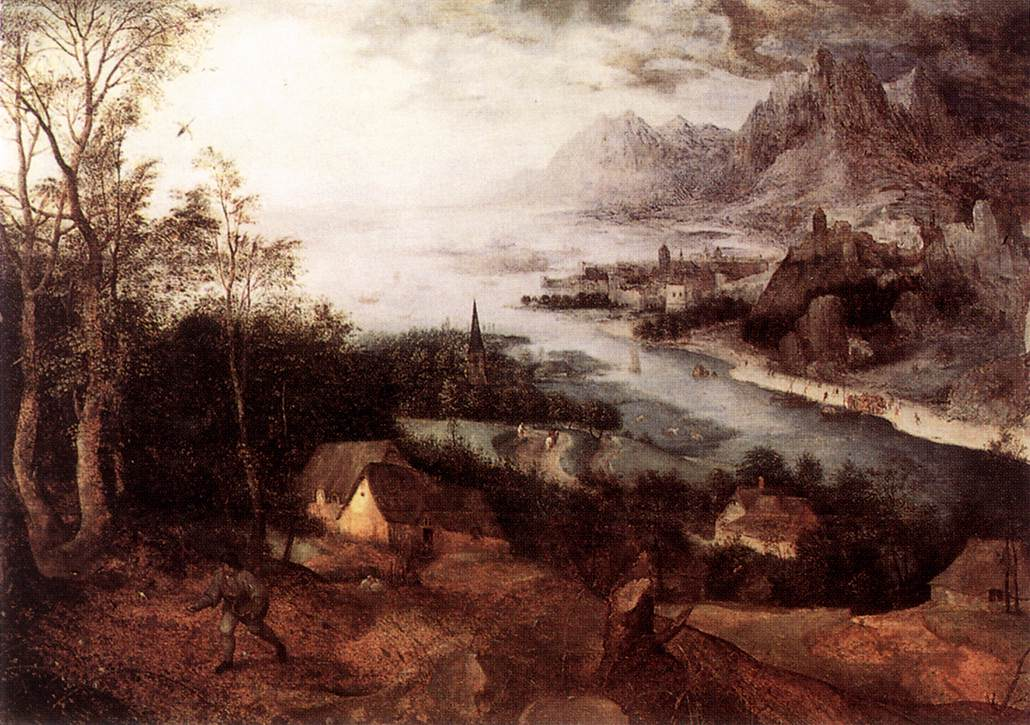
Parable of the Sower by Pieter Bruegel the Elder, 1557

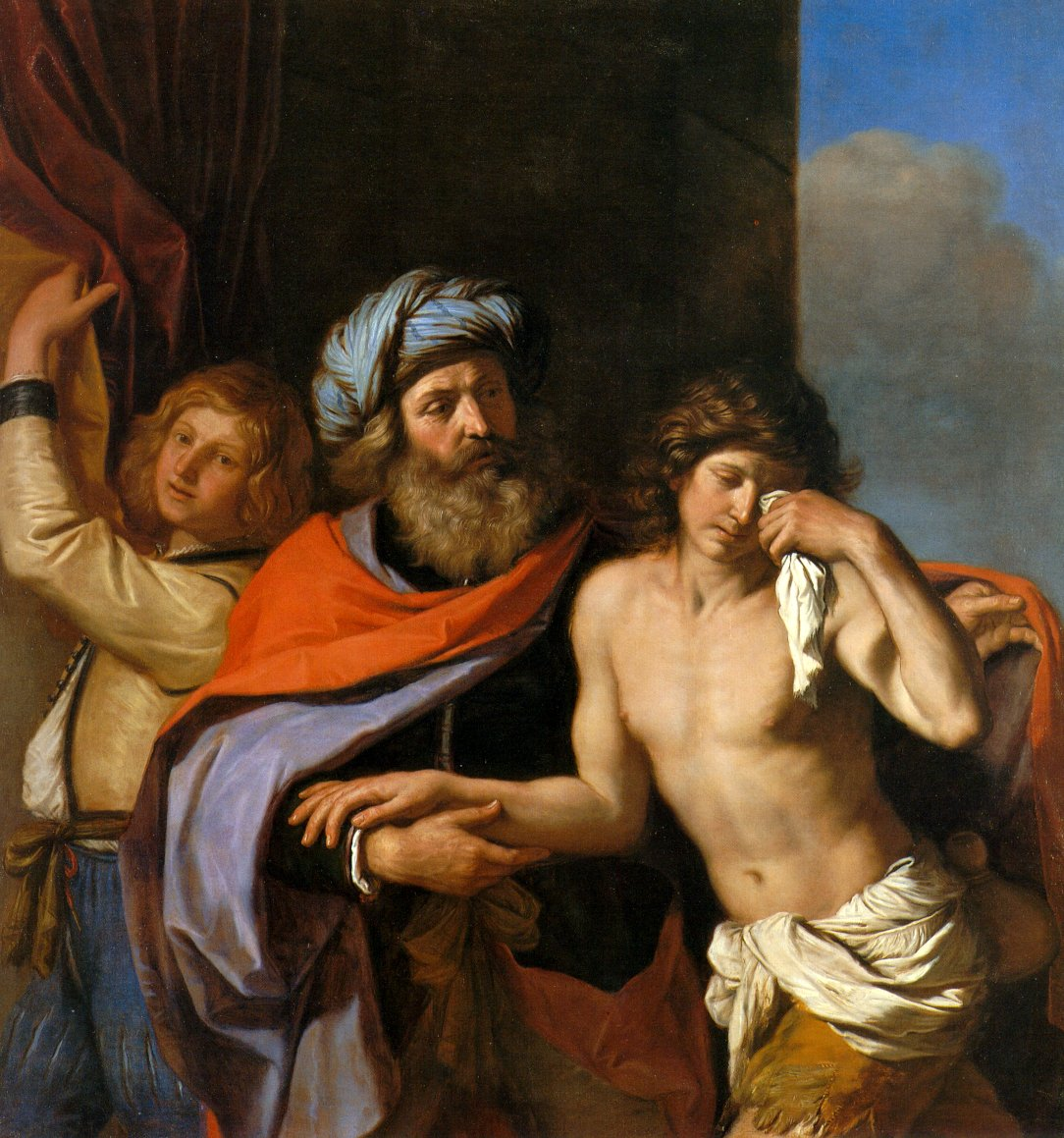
The Return of the Prodigal Son by Guercino, 1654–1655

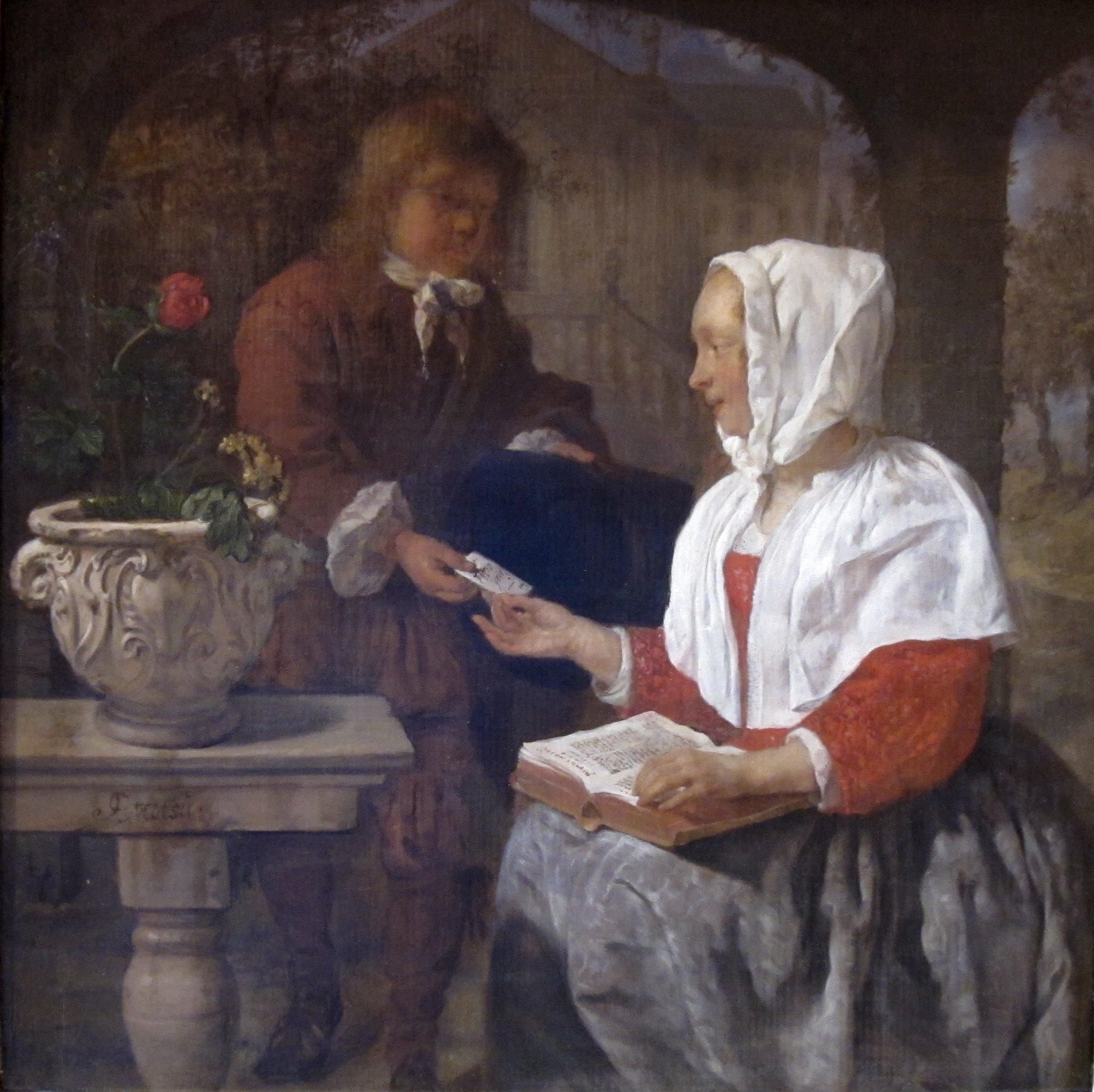
A Girl Receiving a Letter by Gabriel Metsu, c. 1658

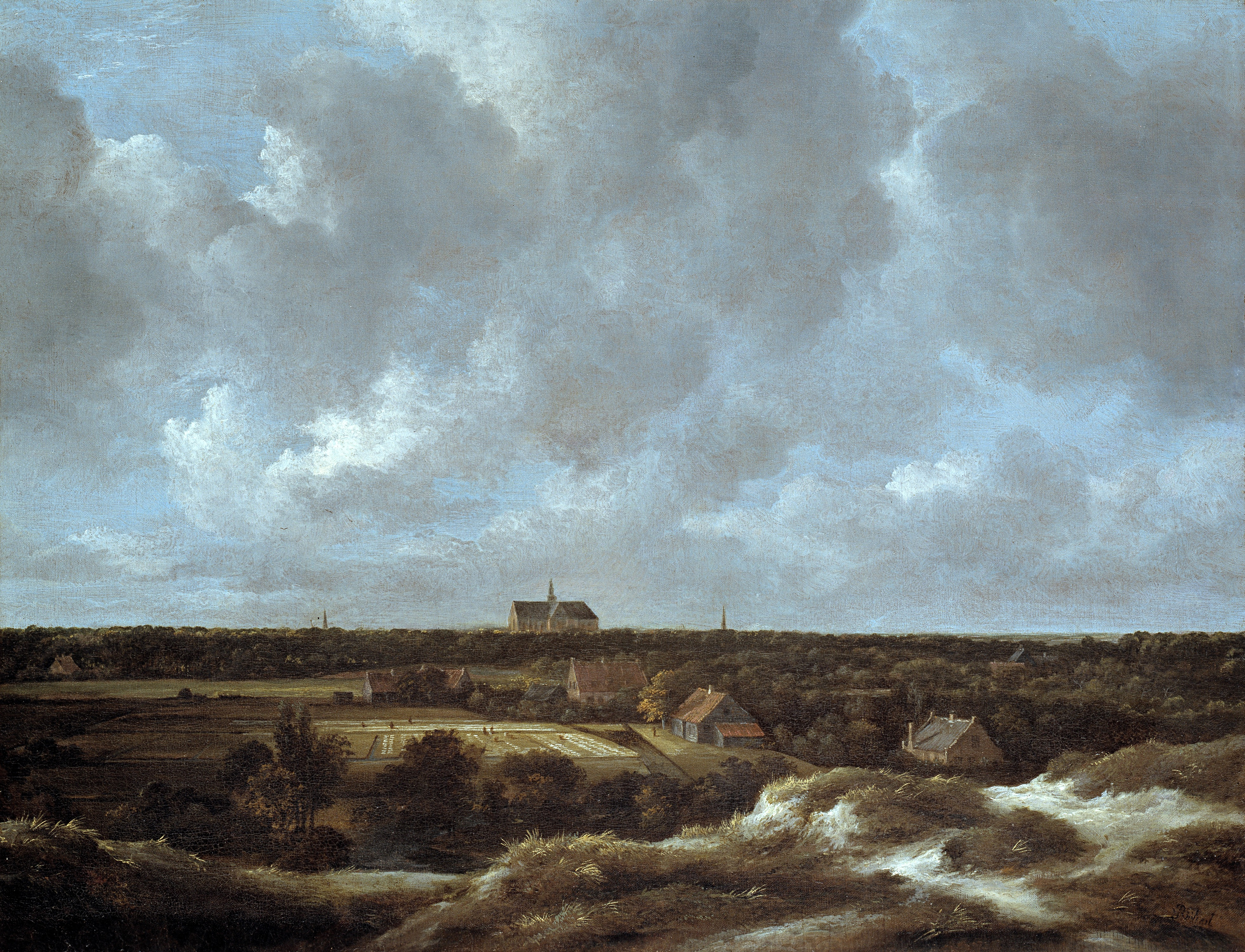
Jacob van Ruisdael, A View of Haarlem and Bleaching Fields, c. 1665–1670

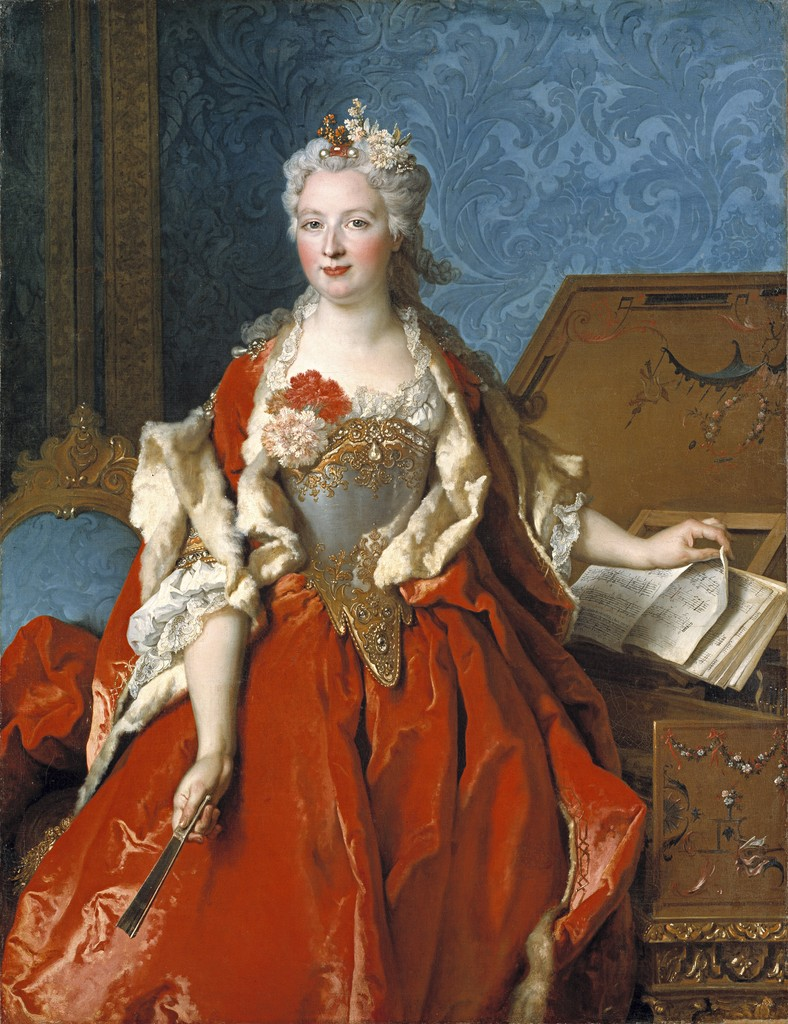
Portrait of Marguerite de Sève, Wife of Barthélemy-Jean-Claude Pupil by Nicolas de Largillière, 1729

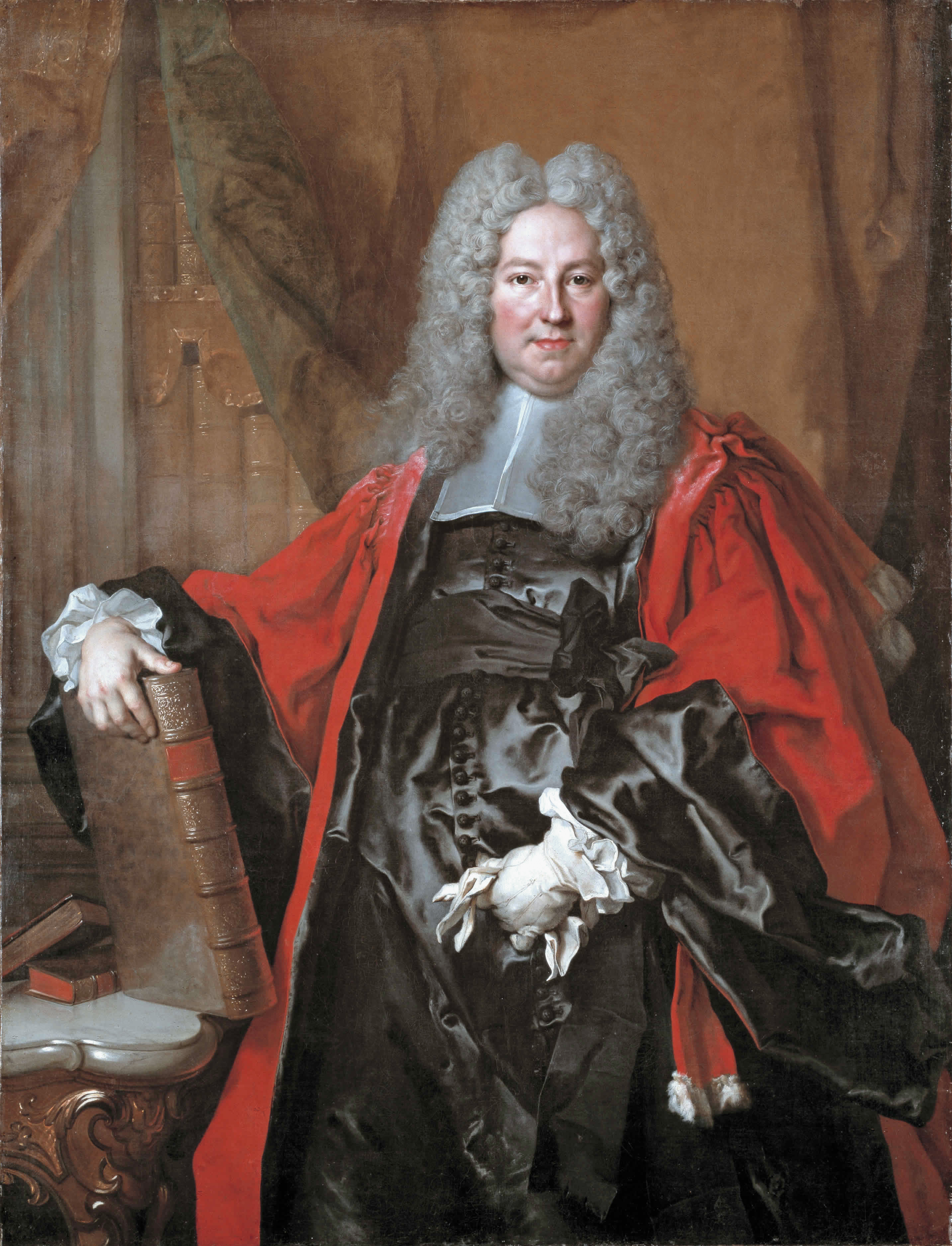
Portrait of Barthélemy-Jean-Claude Pupil by Nicolas de Largillière, 1729

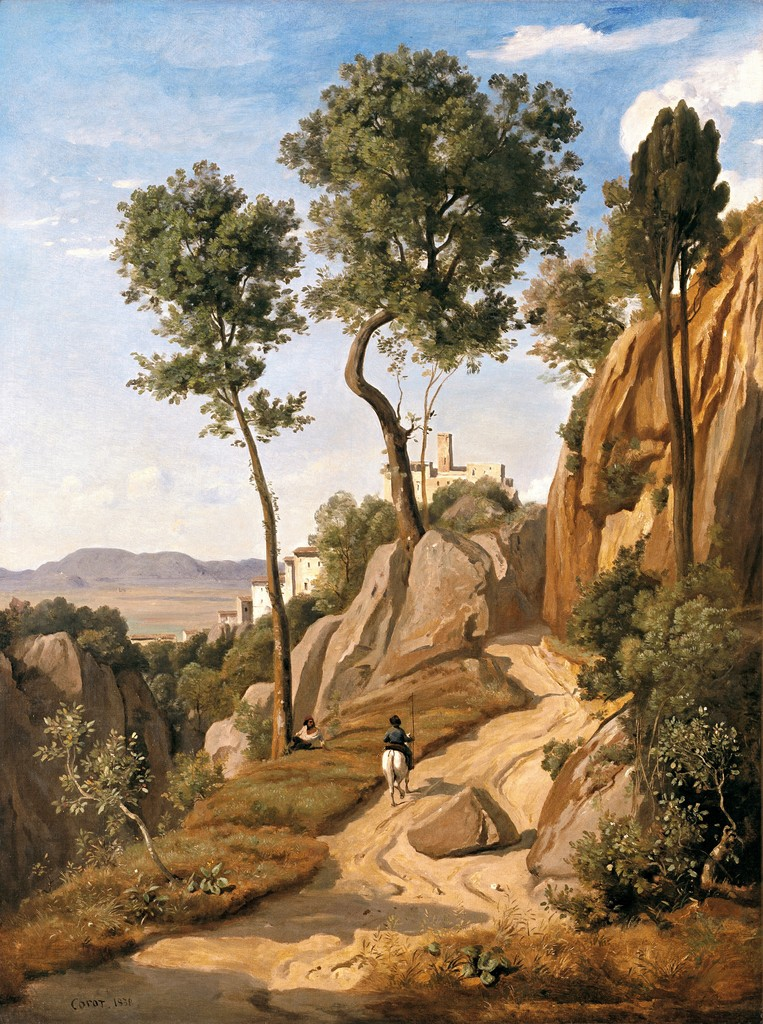
View of Volterra by Jean-Baptiste-Camille Corot

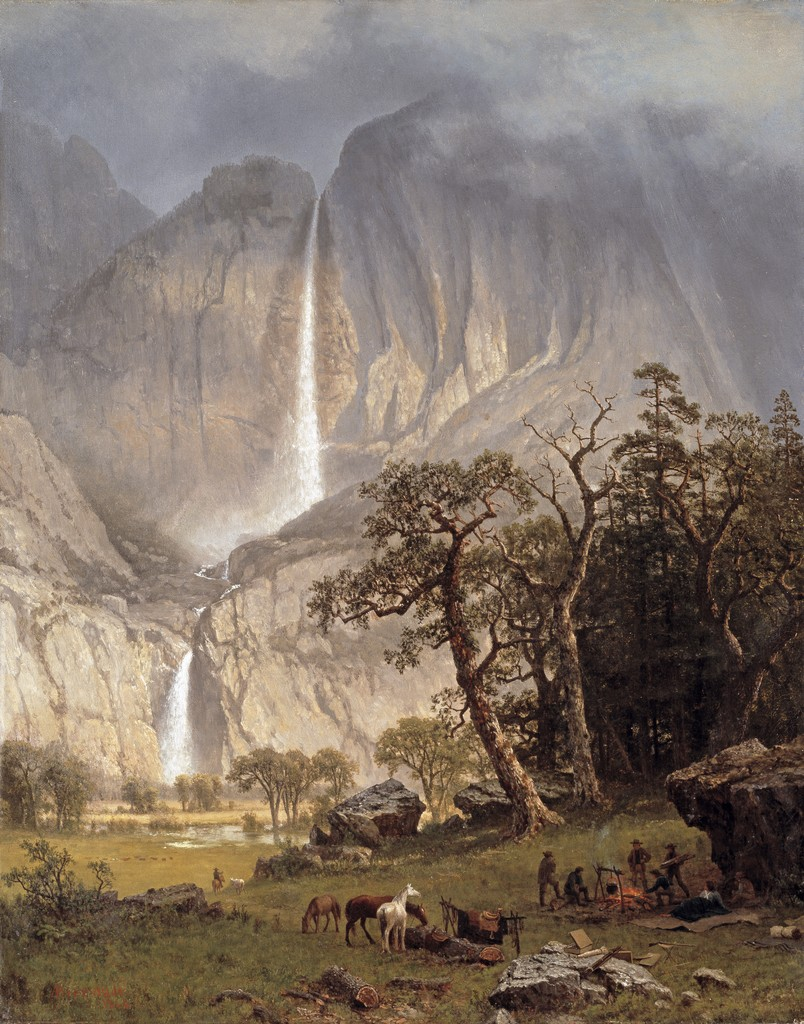
Cho-looke, the Yosemite Fall by Albert Bierstadt, 1864

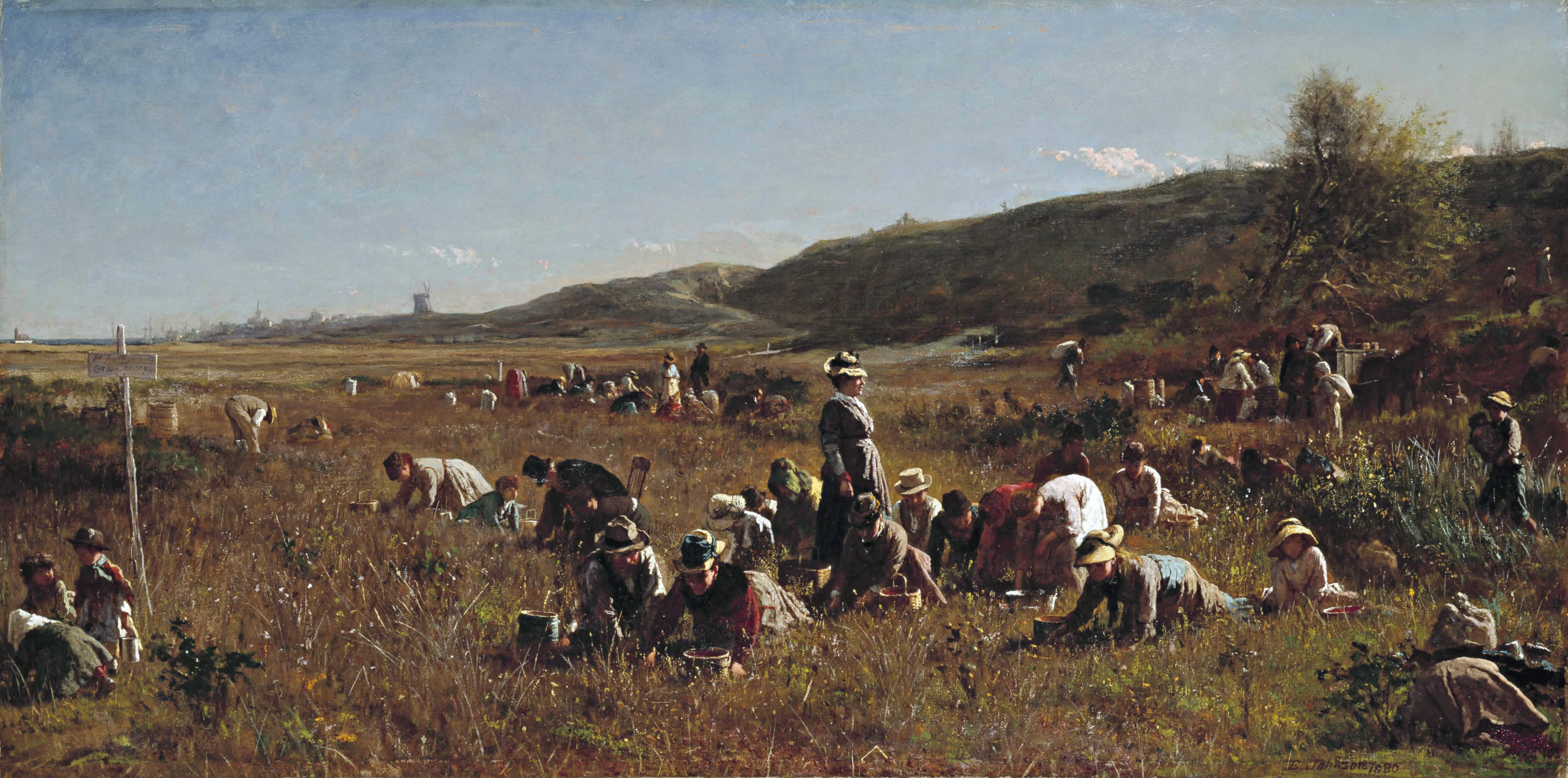
The Cranberry Harvest, Island of Nantucket, by Eastman Johnson, 1880
